= FAMAS Award for Best Supporting Actor =

Award presented annually by the Filipino Academy of Movie Arts and Sciences

- Awarded for: Best Performance by an Actor in a Supporting Role
- Country: Philippines
- Presented by: Filipino Academy of Movie Arts and Sciences Award
- First award: 1952
- Currently held by: Jeric Raval; Mamay (2024)

The FAMAS Award for Best Supporting Actor is one of the FAMAS Awards given to people working in the motion picture industry by the Filipino Academy of Movie Arts and Sciences Award, which are voted on by Palanca Award-winning writers and movie columnists and writers within the industry. It was first awarded in the first FAMAS Ceremony in 1953.

== Winners and nominees ==
The list may be incomplete. In particular, it may not include some of the names of the nominees and the roles portrayed especially during the early years of FAMAS Awards.

In the lists below, the winner of the award for each year is shown first, followed by the other nominees.

Table key
‡	Indicates the winner

=== 1950s ===
Year	Actor	Film	Role
1952 (1st)
1952 (1st)	Gil de Leon‡	Korea	
1952 (1st)	Max Alvarado	Sawa Sa Lumang Simboryo	Berto
1953 (2nd)
1953 (2nd)	Leroy Salvador‡	Huk Sa Bagong Pamumuhay	Jesus
1954 (3rd)
1954 (3rd)	Ruben Rustia‡	Pedro Penduko	
1955 (4th)
1955 (4th)	Panchito‡	Lupang Kayumanggi	
1955 (4th)	Gil de Leon	Sanda Wong	
1955 (4th)	Leroy Salvador	Pilipino kostum: no touch	
1955 (4th)	Oscar Keesee	Higit Sa Lahat	Mr. Roldan
1955 (4th)	Ramon d'Salva	Adventures of DI-13	
1956 (5th)
1956 (5th)	Ramon D'Salva‡	Desperado	
1956 (5th)	Eddie Garcia	Gilda	
1956 (5th)	Eddie Rodriguez	Luksang Tagumpay	
1956 (5th)	Joseph de Cordova	Kumander 13	
1956 (5th)	Venchito Galvez	Tumbando Caña	
1957 (6th)
1957 (6th)	Eddie Garcia‡	Taga Sa Bato	
1957 (6th)	Amado Cortez	Wala Nang Luha	
1957 (6th)	Oscar Keesee	Walang Sugat	
1957 (6th)	Quiel Segovia	Kalibre .45	
1957 (6th)	Romeo Vasquez	Sino Ang Maysala	
1958 (7th)
1958 (7th)	Eddie Garcia‡	Condenado	
1958 (7th)	Alfonso Carvajal	Rebelde	
1958 (7th)	Ben Perez	Hanggang Sa Dulo Ng Daigdig	
1958 (7th)	Eddie Garcia	Anino Ni Bathala	
1958 (7th)	Eusebio Gomez	Verganza	
1958 (7th)	Johnny Monteiro	Singing Idol	
1958 (7th)	Jose Barros	Water Lily	
1958 (7th)	Lauro Delgado	Laban Sa Lahat	
1958 (7th)	Lito Anzures	Impiyerno Sa Paraiso	
1958 (7th)	Tony Cayado	Alaalang Banal	
1959 (8th)
1959 (8th)	Eddie Garcia‡	Tanikalang Apoy	
1959 (8th)	Joseph de Cordova	Kundiman ng Lahi	
1959 (8th)	Pablo Guevarra	Anghel sa Lansangan	
1959 (8th)	Ronald Remy	Ang Maton	
1959 (8th)	Tito Galla	Kidnapped	

=== 1960s ===
Year	Actor	Film	Role
1960 (9th)
1960 (9th)	Oscar Keesee‡	Huwag Mo Akong Limutin	
1960 (9th)	Bob Soler	Kadenang Putik	
1960 (9th)	Eddie Garcia	Gumuhong Bantayog	
1960 (9th)	Johnny Monteiro	Akin Ang Paghihiganti	
1960 (9th)	Lou Salvador Jr.	Krus Na Daan	
1961 (10th)
1961 (10th)	Oscar Keesee‡	Noli Me Tangere	Padre Damaso
1961 (10th)	Johnny Monteiro	Noli Me Tangere	Padre Salvi
1961 (10th)	Max Alvarado	Nag-uumpugang Bato	
1961 (10th)	Quiel Segovia	Mga Yapak Na Walang Bakas	
1961 (10th)	Ruben Rustia	Alaala Kita	
1962 (11th)
1962 (11th)	Lou Salvador Jr.‡	Ako Ang Katarungan	
1962 (11th)	Alfonso Carvajal	Ligaw Na Daigdig	
1962 (11th)	Johnny Monteiro	Suicide Susy	
1962 (11th)	Martin Marfil	Madugong Paghihiganti	
1962 (11th)	Max Alvarado	Pitong Kabanalan Ng Isang Makasalanan	
1962 (11th)	Oscar Keesee	Albano Brothers	
1962 (11th)	Paquito Diaz	Walang Pagkalupig	
1962 (11th)	Robert Arevalo	El filibusterismo	Basilio
1962 (11th)	Ruben Rustia	Kapag Buhay Ang Inutang	
1962 (11th)	Willie Sotelo	Oy... Akin yata yan	
1963 (12th)
1963 (12th)	Lito Anzures‡	Sigaw Ng Digmaan	
1963 (12th)	Dencio Padilla	Ito Ang Maynila	
1963 (12th)	Johnny Monteiro	Batid Ng Diyos	
1963 (12th)	Martin Marfil	Kami'y Kaawaan	
1963 (12th)	Max Alvarado	Tiger Unit	
1963 (12th)	Nello Nayo	Sapagkat kami'y Tao Lamang	
1963 (12th)	Oscar Keesee	Zigzag	
1963 (12th)	Teody Belarmino	Angustia	
1963 (12th)	Vic Silayan	Zigzag	
1964 (13th)
1964 (13th)	Oscar Roncal‡	Lagablab Sa Maribojoc	
1964 (13th)	Berting Labra	Lumuluhang Komiko	
1964 (13th)	Eddie Garcia	Markong Bagsik	
1964 (13th)	Martin Marfil	Gahasan	
1964 (13th)	Tony Santos	Scout Rangers	
1965 (14th)
1965 (14th)	Paquito Diaz‡	Ang Mananandata	
1965 (14th)	Ben Perez	Ang daigdig ng mga api	
1965 (14th)	Fred Galang	Sapagkat Ikaw Ay Akin	
1965 (14th)	George Estregan	Sapang Palay	
1965 (14th)	Larry Silva	Sa Kamay Ng Mga Kilabot	
1965 (14th)	Nello Nayo	Iginuhit sa Buhangin	
1965 (14th)	Pianing Vidal	A Portrait of the Artist as Filipino	
1965 (14th)	Romeo Rivera	Paalam sa Kahapon	
1965 (14th)	Vic Silayan	Pilipinas Kong Mahal	
1965 (14th)	Von Serna	Dugo sa Pantalan	
1966 (15th)
1966 (15th)	Eddie Garcia‡	Ito Ang Pilipino	
1966 (15th)	Bert Leroy Jr.	Bakit Pa Ako Isinilang	
1966 (15th)	Joe Sison	Sabotage	
1966 (15th)	Johnny Monteiro	Ibulong Mo Sa Hangin	
1966 (15th)	Lauro Delgado	Claudia	
1966 (15th)	Lito Anzures	Zamboanga	
1967 (16th)
1967 (16th)	Rod Navarro‡	Dahil Sa Isang Bulaklak	
1967 (16th)	Eddie Garcia	Valiente Brothers	
1967 (16th)	Johnny Wilson	O! Pagsintang Labis	
1967 (16th)	Panchito	Like Father, Like Son: Kung Ano Ang Puno Siya Ang Bunga	
1967 (16th)	Renato Robles	Kapag Puso'y Sinugatan	
1968 (17th)
1968 (17th)	Fred Galang‡	Igorota	
1968 (17th)	Dante Rivero	Alipin Ng Busabos	
1968 (17th)	Dindo Fernando	Liku likong Landas	
1968 (17th)	Eddie Infante	Dambana Ng Kagitingan	
1968 (17th)	Johnny Monteiro	Galo Gimbal	
1968 (17th)	Lauro Delgado	Salamisim	
1968 (17th)	Panchito	Dakilang Tanga	
1968 (17th)	Renato Robles	Siete Dolores	
1968 (17th)	Vic Silayan	Kumander Dimas	
1969 (18th)
1969 (18th)	Eddie Garcia‡	Dugo Ng Bayani	
1969 (18th)	Danilo Nuñez	Badlis Sa Kinabuhi	
1969 (18th)	Oscar Roncal	Eric	
1969 (18th)	Renato Robles	Ikaw	
1969 (18th)	Roldan Aquino	Nasaan Ang Katarungan	

=== 1970s ===
Year	Actor	Film	Role
1970 (19th)
1970 (19th)	Amado Cortez‡	Bakit Ako Pa?	
1970 (19th)	Eddie Garcia	Pipo	
1970 (19th)	Jay Ilagan	Santiago!	
1970 (19th)	Mario O'Hara	Tubog sa Ginto	
1970 (19th)	Ruben Rustia	Psycho Sex Killer	
1971 (20th)
1971 (20th)	Max Alvarado‡	Ang Kampana sa Santa Quiteria	
1971 (20th)	Eddie Garcia	Pagdating Sa Dulo	
1971 (20th)	Jerry Lerma	Hukom Bitay	
1971 (20th)	Joe Sison	Hukom Bitay	
1971 (20th)	Mario O'Hara	Stardoom	
1971 (20th)	Ronaldo Valdez	Lumuha Pati Mga Anghel	
1971 (20th)	Vic Silayan	Lilet	
1972 (21st)
1972 (21st)	Nick Romano‡	Three Faces of Rose Vi	
1972 (21st)	Eddie Garcia	Kamatayan Lamang Ang Makapaghihiwalay	
1972 (21st)	Eddie Mercado	Here In My Heart	
1972 (21st)	Jose Padilla Jr.	The Legend	
1972 (21st)	Romy Diaz	The Legend	
1972 (21st)	Ruben Rustia	Patayin Ang Sugapa	
1973 (22nd)
1973 (22nd)	Eddie Garcia‡	Nueva Vizcaya	
1973 (22nd)	Chia Bee-Tan	Kung Fu Showdown	
1973 (22nd)	Max Alvarado	Esteban	
1973 (22nd)	Panchito	Ang Mahiwagang Daigdig Ni Pedro Penduko	
1973 (22nd)	Ruben Rustia	Tanikalang Dugo	
1973 (22nd)	Subas Herrero	Panic!	
1973 (22nd)	Vic Vargas	Paru-parong Itim	
1974 (23rd)
1974 (23rd)	Van de Leon‡	Batingaw	
1974 (23rd)	Mario Escudero	Ang Pinakamagandang Hayop Sa Balat Ng Lupa	
1974 (23rd)	Mario O'Hara	Tinimbang Ka Ngunit Kulang	
1974 (23rd)	Michael Murray	Sunugin Ang Samar	
1974 (23rd)	Orlando Nadres	Huwag Tularan: Pito Ang Asawa Ko!	
1974 (23rd)	Paquito Diaz	Return Of The Dragon	
1974 (23rd)	Ray Marcos	Isang Gabi... Tatlong Babae	
1974 (23rd)	Tommy Abuel	La Paloma: Ang Kalapating Ligaw	
1975 (24th)
1975 (24th)	Tommy Abuel‡	Maynila, Sa Mga Kuko Ng Liwanag	
1975 (24th)	Johnny Delgado	Banaue: Stairway To The Sky	
1975 (24th)	Lito Anzures	Ang Madugong Daigdig Ni Salvacion	
1975 (24th)	Tony Santos	Araw-araw, Gabi-gabi	
1975 (24th)	Vic Silayan	Diligin Mo Ng Hamog Ang Uhaw Na Lupa	
1976 (25th)
1976 (25th)	Leopoldo Salcedo‡	Ganito Kami Noon, Paano Kayo Ngayon	Fortunato 'Atong' Capili
1976 (25th)	Dick Israel	Escolta; Mayo 13; Biyernes Ng Hapon	
1976 (25th)	Johnny Delgado	Mrs. Teresa Abad Ako Po Si Bing	
1976 (25th)	Paquito Salcedo	Minsa'y Isang Gamu-gamo	
1976 (25th)	Ruel Vernal	Insiang	
1977 (26th)
1977 (26th)	Matt Ranillo III‡	Masarap, Masakit Ang Umibig	
1977 (26th)	Leopoldo Salcedo	Halikan Mo At Magpaalam Sa Kahapon	
1977 (26th)	Leroy Salvador	Mga Bilanggong Birhen	
1977 (26th)	Roldan Aquino	Burlesk Queen	
1977 (26th)	Ruel Vernal	Walang Katapusang Tag-araw	
1978 (27th)
1978 (27th)	George Estregan‡	Kid Kaliwete	
1978 (27th)	Angelo Ventura	Batang City Jail	
1978 (27th)	Anthony Alonzo	Hindi Sa Iyo Ang Mundo, Baby Porcuna	
1978 (27th)	Joonee Gamboa	Pagputi Ng Uwak... Pag-itim Ng Tagak	
1978 (27th)	Mario O'Hara	Gumising Ka, Maruja	
1979 (28th)
1979 (28th)	Leroy Salvador‡	Init	
1979 (28th)	Johnny Delgado	Ang Alamat ni Julian Makabayan	
1979 (28th)	Paquito Diaz	Durugin si Totoy Bato	
1979 (28th)	Menggie Cobarrubias	Jaguar	
1979 (28th)	Vic Silayan	Bituin	

=== 1980s ===
Year	Actor	Film	Role
1980 (29th)
1980 (29th)	George Estregan‡	Lumakad Kang Hubad... Sa Mundong Ibabaw	
1980 (29th)	Jay Ilagan	Aguila	
1980 (29th)	John Del	Kakabakaba Ka Ba?	
1980 (29th)	Lito Anzures	Ang Panday	
1980 (29th)	Van de Leon	Taga sa Panahon	
1981 (30th)
1981 (30th)	Tommy Abuel‡	Karma	
1981 (30th)	Angelo Castro Jr.	Kumander Alibasbas	
1981 (30th)	Anthony Castelo	Pakawalan Mo Ako	
1981 (30th)	Jay Ilagan	Kisapmata	
1981 (30th)	Lito Anzures	Pagbabalik Ng Panday	
1981 (30th)	Romy Diaz	Ang Maestro	
1981 (30th)	Ting Jocson	High School Scandal	
1982 (31st)
1982 (31st)	Juan Rodrigo‡	Moral	
1982 (31st)	Joel Alano	Santa Claus Is Coming To Town	
1982 (31st)	Lito Anzures	Ang Panday: Ikatlong Yugto	
1982 (31st)	Mark Gil	Palipat-lipat, Papalit-palit	
1982 (31st)	Paquito Diaz	In This Corner	
1982 (31st)	Rodolfo "Boy" Garcia	Ito Ba Ang Ating Mga Anak	
1982 (31st)	Ronaldo Valdez	Pedring Taruc	
1982 (31st)	Tommy Abuel	Gaano Kadalas Ang Minsan	
1983 (32nd)
1983 (32nd)	Vic Silayan‡	Karnal	
1983 (32nd)	Dencio Padilla	Tatak Yakuza	
1983 (32nd)	Johnny Wilson	Isang Bala Ka Lang	
1983 (32nd)	Paquito Diaz	Pedro Tunasan	
1983 (32nd)	Ramon Revilla Jr.	Dugong Buhay	
1983 (32nd)	Robert Arevalo	Ang Boyfriend Kong Kano	
1983 (32nd)	Tommy Abuel	Palabra de Honor	
1984 (33rd)
1984 (33rd)	Celso Ad Castillo‡	Sampung Ahas Ni Eva	
1984 (33rd)	Tony Santos‡	Sister Stella L.	
1984 (33rd)	Dindo Fernando	Baby Tsina	
1984 (33rd)	George Estregan	Sa Bulaklak Ng Apoy	
1984 (33rd)	Paquito Diaz	Ang Panday IV	
1984 (33rd)	Tommy Abuel	Kriminal	
1984 (33rd)	Zandro Zamora	Ang Padrino	
1985 (34th)
1985 (34th)	Dante Rivero‡	Sa Dibdib Ng Sierra Madre	
1985 (34th)	Aga Muhlach	Miguelito: Batang Rebelde	
1985 (34th)	Edu Manzano	Ano Ang Kulay Ng Mukha Ng Diyos	
1985 (34th)	George Estregan	Mga Paru-parong Bukid	
1985 (34th)	Lito Anzures	Paradise Inn	
1985 (34th)	Miguel Rodriguez	Partida	
1985 (34th)	Tommy Abuel	God Save Me	
1986 (35th)
1986 (35th)	Michael de Mesa‡	Unfaithful Wife	
1986 (35th)	Dindo Fernando	Magdusa Ka	
1986 (35th)	George Estregan	Magkayakap Sa Magdamag	
1986 (35th)	Mario Montenegro	Anak Ng Supremo	
1986 (35th)	Mark Gil	Agaw Armas	
1986 (35th)	Paquito Diaz	Magnum Muslim .357	
1986 (35th)	Ronaldo Valdez	Huwag Mo Kaming Isumpa	
1987 (36th)
1987 (36th)	Jay Ilagan‡	Maging Akin Ka Lamang	
1987 (36th)	Johnny Delgado	Balweg: Rebel Priest	
1987 (36th)	Mark Gil	Kid, Huwag Kang Susuko	
1987 (36th)	Ricky Davao	Kung Aagawin Mo Ang Lahat Sa Akin	
1987 (36th)	Ronnie Ricketts	Target: Sparrow Unit	
1988 (37th)
1988 (37th)	Miguel Rodriguez‡	Ibulong Mo Sa Diyos	
1988 (37th)	Dante Rivero	Natutulog Pa Ang Diyos	
1988 (37th)	Dick Israel	Patrolman	
1988 (37th)	Ernie Garcia	Bukas Sisikat Din Ang Araw	
1988 (37th)	Joel Torre	Magkano Ang Iyong Dangal	
1988 (37th)	Paquito Diaz	Kumander Dante	
1989 (38th)
1989 (38th)	Ricky Davao‡	Abot Hanggang Sukdulan	Romano Barredo
1989 (38th)	Allan Paule	Macho Dancer	Pol
1989 (38th)	Bembol Roco	Babangon Ako't Dudurugin Kita	Rod
1989 (38th)	Cesar Montano	Ang Bukas Ay Akin Langit Ang Uusig	Prego
1989 (38th)	Efren Reyes Jr.	Delima Gang	Sergeant Lucas
1989 (38th)	Eric Quizon	Pahiram ng Isang Umaga	Ariel
1989 (38th)	Johnny Delgado	Joe Pring: Homicide Manila Police	

=== 1990s ===
Year	Actor	Film	Role
1990 (39th)
1990 (39th)	Edu Manzano‡	Kaaway ng Batas	Ryan
1990 (39th)	Eddie Rodriguez	Ayaw Matulog ng Gabi	
1990 (39th)	Efren Reyes Jr.	Angel Molave	Boy Lee
1990 (39th)	Jeffrey Santos	Kapag Langit ang Humatol	Oliver
1991 (40th)
1991 (40th)	Eric Quizon‡	Hihintayin Kita sa Langit	Alan
1991 (40th)	Daniel Fernando	Huwag Mong Salingin ang Sugat Ko	Baklita
1991 (40th)	Dick Israel	Boyong Mañalac: Hoodlum Terminator	Pipi
1991 (40th)	Gabby Concepcion	Kislap sa Dilim	Dick
1991 (40th)	Leo Martinez	Juan Tamad at Mister Shooli: Mongolian Barbecue	Manhik-Manaog
1992 (41st)
1992 (41st)	Eddie Gutierrez‡(TIE)	Ikaw Pa Lang ang Minahal	Maximo
1992 (41st)	Gabby Concepcion‡(TIE)	Sinungaling Mong Puso	Roman
1992 (41st)	Johnny Delgado	Lumayo Ka Man Sa Akin	Jaime
1992 (41st)	Mark Gil	Narito ang Puso Ko	Tato
1992 (41st)	Tirso Cruz III	Kahit Buhay Ko...	Melgar
1993 (42nd)
1993 (42nd)	Ronaldo Valdez‡	May Minamahal	Cenon
1993 (42nd)	Dick Israel	Humanda Ka Mayor!: Bahala Na ang Diyos	Mayor Miguel Beltran
1993 (42nd)	Joonee Gamboa	Mario Sandoval	
1993 (42nd)	Pen Medina	Sakay	Col. Lucio de Vega
1993 (42nd)	Tirso Cruz III	Lumuhod Ka sa Lupa	
1994 (43rd)
1994 (43rd)	Dick Israel‡	Kanto Boy 2: Anak ni Totoy Guapo	Benjie
1994 (43rd)	Jayvee Gayoso	Vampira	Miguel
1994 (43rd)	Johnny Delgado	Macario Durano	Velasquez
1994 (43rd)	Miguel Rodriguez	The Elsa Castillo Story... Ang Katotohanan	Ted Boorman
1994 (43rd)	Robert Arevalo	Maalaala Mo Kaya	Miguel
1995 (44th)
1995 (44th)	Jinggoy Estrada‡	The Marita Gonzaga Rape-Slay: In God We Trust!	
1995 (44th)	John Regala	Pamilya Valderama	
1995 (44th)	Kier Legaspi	Mangarap Ka	Jayvee
1995 (44th)	Ricky Davao	Ipaglaban Mo!: The Movie	
1995 (44th)	Tonton Gutierrez	Dahas	Eric
1996 (45th)
1996 (45th)	Joel Torre‡	Mumbaki	Dr. Felix Lorenzo
1996 (45th)	Chinggoy Alonzo	Ikaw Naman ang Iiyak	Don Velario
1996 (45th)	Koko Trinidad	Madrasta	Lolo
1996 (45th)	Nonie Buencamino	Mulanay: Sa Pusod ng Paraiso	Mulanoy
1996 (45th)	Tirso Cruz III	Hangga't May Hininga	Cong. Ramirez
1997 (46th)
1997 (46th)	Herbert Bautista‡	Bobby Barbers: Parak	Pinggoy
1997 (46th)	Monsour del Rosario	Padre Kalibre	Bading Garci
1997 (46th)	Nonie Buencamino	Milagros	Bugrong
1997 (46th)	Robert Arevalo	Damong Ligaw	Victor
1997 (46th)	Ronaldo Valdez	Nasaan ang Puso	Edgardo
1997 (46th)	Roy C. Iglesias	Nasaan ang Puso	Bordyoks
1998 (47th)
1998 (47th)	Jaime Fabregas‡	Jose Rizal	Luis Taviel de Andrade
1998 (47th)	Celso Ad. Castillo	Hiwaga ng Panday	
1998 (47th)	Cris Villanueva	Miguel/Michelle	Julio
1998 (47th)	Joel Torre	Jose Rizal	Ibarra/Simoun
1998 (47th)	Robert Arevalo	Birador	Mario
1999 (48th)
1999 (48th)	Raymond Bagatsing‡	Soltera	Dr. Jojo Morales
1999 (48th)	Jhong Hilario	Muro-Ami	
1999 (48th)	Jomari Yllana	Bulaklak ng Maynila	Ed
1999 (48th)	Mark Gil	Saranggola	Potyong
1999 (48th)	Piolo Pascual	Esperanza: The Movie	Brian

=== 2000s ===
Year	Actor	Film	Role
2000 (49th)
2000 (49th)	Jeffrey Quizon‡	Markova: Comfort Gay	Young Walterina Markova
2000 (49th)	Jericho Rosales	Tanging Yaman	Rommel
2000 (49th)	Koko Trinidad	Lagarista	Lolo Paking
2000 (49th)	Patrick Garcia	Sugatang Puso	Eric
2000 (49th)	Ricky Davao	Azucena	Tomas
2001 (50th)
2001 (50th)	Carlo Muñoz‡	Yamashita: The Tiger's Treasure	Young Carmelo Rosales
2002 (51st)
2002 (51st)	Piolo Pascual‡	Dekada '70	Julian "Jules" Bartolome Jr.
2002 (51st)	Roi Vinzon	Batas ng Lansangan	Carlos
2003 (52nd)
2003 (52nd)	Mark Gil‡	Magnifico	Domeng
2003 (52nd)	Marvin Agustin	Ang Tanging Ina	Juan / Uno
2003 (52nd)	Paolo Contis	Noon at Ngayon (Pagsasamang Kay Ganda)	Bryan
2003 (52nd)	Tirso Cruz III	Chavit	Biboy Crisostomo
2004 (53rd)
2004 (53rd)	Dennis Trillo‡	Aishite Imasu 1941: Mahal Kita	Ignacio Basa / Igna
2004 (53rd)	Albert Martinez	Anak Ka ng Tatay Mo	Becky
2004 (53rd)	Ricky Davao	All My Life	Jun
2005 (54th)
2005 (54th)	John Lloyd Cruz‡	Dubai	Andrew
2005 (54th)	Dennis Trillo	Mulawin: The Movie	Gabriel
2005 (54th)	John Prats	Ako Legal Wife: Mano Po 4?	Hamilton Chiong
2005 (54th)	Johnny Delgado	La Visa Loca	Pepang
2005 (54th)	Kristoffer King	Masahista	Lester
2006 (55th)
2006 (55th)	Allen Dizon‡	Twilight Dancers	Alfred
2006 (55th)	Allan Paule	Kaleldo	Andy Pineda
2006 (55th)	Jimmy Concepcion	Barang	Thomas
2006 (55th)	Tommy Abuel	Don't Give Up On Us	Robert
2006 (55th)	Wendell Ramos	Sukob	Dale
2007 (56th)
2007 (56th)	Mon Confiado‡	Faces Of Love	Marlee
2007 (56th)	Christopher de Leon	Banal	Major Sagala
2007 (56th)	Dingdong Dantes	Resiklo	Angelo
2007 (56th)	Publio J. Briones III	Confessional	Lito Caliso
2007 (56th)	Robin Da Roza	Paano Kita Iibigin	Allan
2008 (57th)
2008 (57th)	German Moreno‡	Paupahan	Dadeng
2008 (57th)	Boyong Fernandez	Ploning	Mou Sei
2008 (57th)	Eddie Gutierrez	For The First Time	Hector Villaraza
2008 (57th)	Emilio Garcia	Walang Kawala	Rufo
2008 (57th)	John Manalo	Caregiver	Paulo "Pau de Arco" Gonzales
2008 (57th)	Phillip Salvador	Baler	Daniel Reyes
2009 (58th)
2009 (58th)	Emilio Garcia‡	Sagrada Familia	Johnny Asero Jr.
2009 (58th)	Baron Geisler	Nandito Ako Nagmamahal Sa'Yo	Prince Suganob
2009 (58th)	Luis Manzano	In My Life	Mark Salvacion
2009 (58th)	Phillip Salvador	Ang Panday	Lizardo
2009 (58th)	Ricky Davao	Love Me Again (Land Down Under)	Mang Wayne
2009 (58th)	Robert Arevalo	Dukot	Mang Kanor

=== 2010s ===
Year	Actor	Film	Role
2010 (59th)
2010 (59th)	Allen Dizon‡	Sigwa	Eddie
2010 (59th)	Baron Geisler	Noy	Caloy
2010 (59th)	Carlo Aquino	Ang Tanging Ina Mo (Last na 'To!)	Dimitri "Tri" Montecillo
2010 (59th)	Jaime Fabregas	Here Comes the Bride	Bien
2010 (59th)	Sid Lucero	Rosario	Carding
2011 (60th)
2011 (60th)	Baron Geisler‡	Manila Kingpin: The Asiong Salonga Story	Ernesto "Erning Toothpick" Reyes
2011 (60th)	Jake Cuenca	In the Name of Love	Dylan Evelino
2011 (60th)	Jhong Hilario	Segunda Mano	Dindo
2011 (60th)	Marvin Agustin	The Road	Luis' father
2011 (60th)	Phillip Salvador	Ang Panday 2	Lizardo
2011 (60th)	Rayver Cruz	A Mother's Story	King Santos
2011 (60th)	Tirso Cruz III	No Other Woman	Fernando Zalderiaga
2012 (61st)
2012 (61st)	Cesar Montano‡	El Presidente	Andres Bonifacio
2012 (61st)	Jose Manalo	Si Agimat, si Enteng Kabisote at si Ako	Jose
2012 (61st)	Martin del Rosario	Amorosa: The Revenge	Amiel
2012 (61st)	Ronaldo Valdez	The Mistress	Rico Torres
2012 (61st)	Tony Mabesa	Migrante	
2012 (61st)	Zanjoe Marudo	One More Try	Tristan
2013 (62nd)
2013 (62nd)	Pen Medina‡	10,000 Hours	Sebastian Jago
2013 (62nd)	Baron Geisler	Boy Golden: Shoot to Kill, the Arturo Porcuna Story	Datu Putla
2013 (62nd)	Enrique Gil	She's the One	David
2013 (62nd)	Joel Torre	On the Job	Tatang / Mario Maghari
2013 (62nd)	Joey Marquez	On the Job	SP01 Joaquin Acosta
2013 (62nd)	John Estrada	Boy Golden: Shoot to Kill, the Arturo Porcuna Story	Miguel "Tony" Razon
2014 (63rd)
2014 (63rd)	Gabby Eigenmann‡	Asintado	Carias
2014 (63rd)	Emilio Garcia	Magkakabaung	Mr. Canda
2014 (63rd)	Ian Veneracion	Feng Shui 2	Douglas
2014 (63rd)	Jim Pebanco	Kamkam	Arthur
2014 (63rd)	Lito Pimentel	Starting Over Again	Tatay Ben
2014 (63rd)	Richard Gomez	She's Dating the Gangster	Kenji Delos Reyes (present time)
2014 (63rd)	Richard Gomez	The Trial	Julian Bien
2014 (63rd)	Roi Vinzon	Magnum Muslim .357: To Serve and Protect	Bng. Gen. Gideon de Tagle
2014 (63rd)	Romnick Sarmenta	Hustisya	
2015 (64th)
2015 (64th)	Gabby Concepcion‡	Crazy Beautiful You	Mayor Itok Alcantara
2015 (64th)	Christopher de Leon	Tragic Theater	Miguel Sanchez Agcaoili
2015 (64th)	Freddie Webb	You're My Boss	Sir Albert Chief
2015 (64th)	Guji Lorenzana	Silong	Gilbert
2015 (64th)	Iñigo Pascual	Para sa Hopeless Romantic	Ryan Sebastian
2015 (64th)	Jeffrey Quizon	Angela Markado	Bardagol
2015 (64th)	Ketchup Eusebio	A Second Chance	Gong Gong
2015 (64th)	Ronwaldo Martin	Ari: My Life With A King	Jaypee
2016 (65th)
2016 (65th)	Ricky Davao‡	Iadya Mo Kami	Julian
2016 (65th)	Joshua Garcia	Barcelona: A Love Untold	Tonying
2016 (65th)	Nico Gomez	Ku'te	Roldan
2016 (65th)	Paulo Avelino	The Unmarried Wife	Bryan
2016 (65th)	Ronnie Alonte	Vince and Kath and James	Jaime "James" Raymundo III
2017 (66th)
2017 (66th)	Mon Confiado‡	Mga Gabing Kasing Haba Ng Hair Ko	Kuya Roger
2017 (66th)	Aga Muhlach	Seven Sundays	Allan Bonifacio
2017 (66th)	Dido de la Paz	Respeto	Fortunato "Doc" Reyes
2017 (66th)	Edgar Allan Guzman	Deadma Walking	Mark "Crying Diva"
2017 (66th)	Jess Mendoza	Sa Gabing Nanahimik ang Mga Kuliglig	Shokla Bakla Gay
2017 (66th)	John Arcilla	Birdshot	Mendoza
2017 (66th)	Loonie	Respeto	Breezy G
2017 (66th)	Ricky Davao	Paki	Delfin
2017 (66th)	Robert Arevalo	Ang Larawan	Don Perico
2018 (67th)
2018 (67th)	Joem Bascon‡	Double Twisting Double Back	Wasi
2018 (67th)	Arjo Atayde	BuyBust	Biggie Chen
2018 (67th)	Arron Villaflor	Mamu: And a Mother Too	Vincent
2018 (67th)	Gabby Eigenmann	Citizen Jake	Roxie Herrera
2018 (67th)	Levi Ignacio	BuyBust	Chongki
2018 (67th)	Menggie Cobarrubias	Kung Paano Hinihintay ang Dapithapon	Celso
2018 (67th)	Nanding Josef	Signal Rock	Jamin Abakan
2018 (67th)	Publio J. Briones III	A Short History of a Few Bad Things	Chief Ouano
2018 (67th)	Richard "Ebong" Joson	Liway	Don Pepot
2018 (67th)	Soliman Cruz	Gusto Kita with All My Hypothalamus	Lando
2018 (67th)	Teroy de Guzman	Citizen Jake	Jacobo Herrera Sr.
2019 (68th)
2019 (68th)	Ricky Davao‡	F#*@bois	Bugrong
2019 (68th)	Boo Gabunada	Sila-sila	Stranger
2019 (68th)	JC Santos	Babae at Baril	Miguel
2019 (68th)	Phillippe Salvador Palmos	Akin ang Korona	Pia
2019 (68th)	Topper Fabregas	Sila-sila	Jared

=== 2020s ===
Year	Actor	Film	Role
2020 (69th)
2020 (69th)	Enzo Pineda‡	He Who Is Without Sin	Lawrence
2020 (69th)	Dominic Ochoa	Four Sisters Before the Wedding	Carlos "Caloy" Salazar
2020 (69th)	Ian Veneracion	Block Z	Mario
2020 (69th)	Jake Macapagal	Watch List	Lt. Ventura
2020 (69th)	Michael de Mesa	Isa Pang Bahaghari	Reynaldo "Rhey/Reynalda" Torrecampo
2020 (69th)	Micko Laurente	Watch List	
2021 (70th)
2021 (70th)	Johnrey Rivas‡	Katips	Art
2021 (70th)	John Arcilla	A Hard Day	Lt. Ace "Alas" Franco
2021 (70th)	John Arcilla	Big Night!	Donato Rapido
2021 (70th)	Mon Confiado	Katips	Lt. Sales
2021 (70th)	Nico Antonio	Big Night!	Zues
2022 (71st)
2022 (71st)	Sid Lucero‡	Reroute	Dan
2022 (71st)	Mon Confiado	Nanahimik ang Gabi	Soliman
2022 (71st)	Nonie Buencamino	Family Matters	Francisco "Kiko" Jr.
2022 (71st)	Rocky Salumbides	Leonor Will Never Die	Ronwaldo
2022 (71st)	Soliman Cruz	Blue Room	
2023 (72nd)
2023 (72nd)	LA Santos‡	In His Mother's Eyes	Tim
2023 (72nd)	Enchong Dee	GomBurZa	Padre Jacinto Zamora y del Rosario
2023 (72nd)	JC Santos	Mallari	Brother Lucas Alarcon Segundo
2023 (72nd)	Pepe Herrera	Rewind	Lods / Jesus Christ / Jess
2023 (72nd)	Romnick Sarmenta	Becky & Badette	Pepe Feniz
2023 (72nd)	Soliman Cruz	Monday First Screening	
2024 (73rd)
2024 (73rd)	Jeric Raval‡	Mamay	Mayor Marcos Mamay
2024 (73rd)	Jhong Hilario	And the Breadwinner Is...	Biboy Salvador
2024 (73rd)	Joel Torre	Under a Piaya Moon	Leopoldo "Lolo Poldo" Infante
2024 (73rd)	Ruru Madrid	Green Bones	Xavier Gonzaga
2024 (73rd)	Sid Lucero	Topakk	Romero
2024 (73rd)	Will Ashley	Balota	Enzo

== Multiple wins and nominations ==
The following individuals won two or more FAMAS Awards for Best Supporting Actor:

Wins	Actor	Nominations	First Win	Latest Win
6	Eddie Garcia	14	Taga sa Bato (1957)	Nueva Vizcaya (1973)
3	Ricky Davao	9	Abot Hanggang Sukdulan (1989)	Fuccbois (2019)
2	Allen Dizon	2	Twilight Dancers (2006)	Sigwa (2010)
2	Gabby Concepcion	3	Sinungaling Mong Puso (1992)	Crazy Beautiful You (2015)
2	George Estregan	6	Kid Kaliwete (1978)	Lumakad Kang Hubad…Sa Mundong Ibabaw (1980)
2	Leroy Salvador	4	Huk sa Bagong Pamumuhay (1953)	Init (1979)
2	Mon Confiado	4	Faces of Love (2007)	Mga Gabing Kasinghaba ng Hair Ko (2017)
2	Oscar Keesee	6	Huwag Mo Akong Limutin (1960)	Noli Me Tangere (1961)
2	Tommy Abuel	8	Maynila, Sa Mga Kuko ng Liwanag (1975)	Karma (1981)

The following individuals received four or more Best Supporting Actor nominations:

Nominations	Actor	First Nomination	Latest Nomination
14	Eddie Garcia	Gilda (1956)	Nueva Vizcaya (1973)
9	Paquito Diaz	Walang Pagkalupig (1962)	Kumander Dante (1988)
9	Ricky Davao	Kung Aagawin Mo ang Lahat sa Akin (1987)	Fuccbois (2019)
8	Johnny Delgado	Banaue: Stairway to the Sky (1975)	La Visa Loca (2005)
8	Lito Anzures	Impiyerno sa Paraiso (1958)	Paradise Inn (1985)
8	Tommy Abuel	La Paloma: Ang Kalapating Ligaw (1974)	Don't Give Up on Us (2006)
7	Johnny Monteiro	Singing Idol (1958)	Galo Gimbal (1968)
7	Robert Arevalo	El Filibusterismo (1962)	Ang Larawan (2017)
7	Vic Silayan	Zigzag (1963)	Karnal (1983)
6	George Estregan	Sapang Palay (1965)	Magkayakap sa Magdamag (1986)
6	Mark Gil	Palipat-lipat, Papalit-palit (1982)	Magnifico (2003)
6	Max Alvarado	Sawa sa Lumang Simboryo (1952)	Esteban (1973)
6	Oscar Keesee	Higit sa Lahat (1955)	Zigzag (1963)
6	Ronaldo Valdez	Lumuha Pati Mga Anghel (1971)	The Mistress (2012)
6	Ruben Rustia	Pedro Penduko (1954)	Tanikalang Dugo (1973)
5	Dick Israel	Escolta; Mayo 13; Biyernes ng Hapon (1976)	Kanto Boy 2: Anak ni Totoy Guapo (1994)
5	Joel Torre	Magkano ang Iyong Dangal (1988)	Under a Piaya Moon (2024)
5	Tirso Cruz III	Kahit Buhay Ko (1992)	No Other Woman (2011)
4	Baron Geisler	Nandito Ako... Nagmamahal Sa 'Yo (2009)	Boy Golden: Shoot to Kill (2013)
4	Jay Ilagan	Santiago! (1970)	Maging Akin Ka Lamang (1987)
4	Leroy Salvador	Huk sa Bagong Pamumuhay (1953)	Init (1979)
4	Mario O'Hara	Tubog sa Ginto (1970)	Gumising Ka, Maruja (1978)
4	Mon Confiado	Faces of Love (2007)	Nanahimik ang Gabi (2022)
4	Panchito	Lupang Kayumanggi (1955)	Ang Mahiwagang Daigdig ni Pedro Penduko (1973)
