= Wanted: Perfect Mother =

1970 film by Lino Brocka

- Directed by: Lino Brocka
- Screenplay by: Lino Brocka
- Based on: Wanted: Perfect Mother by Mars Ravelo
- Produced by: Emilia Blas
- Starring: Dante Rivero; Boots Anson-Roa; Liza Lorena
- Cinematography: Conrado Baltazar
- Edited by: Felizardo Santos
- Music by: D'Amarillo
- Distributed by: Lea Productions
- Release date: 14 June 1970
- Running time: 128 minutes
- Country: Philippines
- Languages: Tagalog; English

Wanted: Perfect Mother is a 1970 Philippine musical melodrama film written and directed by Lino Brocka in his feature directorial debut. It was based on the comics serial by Mars Ravelo. The film starred Dante Rivero, Boots Anson-Roa, and Liza Lorena. It was remade in 1996 starring Regine Velasquez and Christopher de Leon.

== Plot summary ==
A wealthy couple, Dante and Elsa, hires a governess, Carla, to care for their four children. Carla establishes a rapport with the children and Dante, which leads to rumors about an affair. After Carla leaves, Elsa dies in a car accident. Dante decides to remarry and get his children a new mother, with Carla soon emerging as the leading choice, until the head servant Lucia schemes to turn the children against her.

== Cast ==
- Dante Rivero as Dante
- Boots Anson-Roa as Carla
- Liza Lorena as Elsa
- Caridad Sanchez as Lucia
- Mary Walter as Linda’s Mother
- Etang Discher as Magna
- Eddie Mercado as Ferdie
- Rebecca Domingo as Ms. Mabintog
- Gina Alajar as Dorina
- Ariosto Reyes Jr. as Rex
- Arnold Gamboa as Zaldy
- Snooky Serna as Neneng
- Chiquita Trapaga sa Linda
- Jay Ilagan as man on the beach (uncredited)
- Hilda Koronel as Ms. Campos (uncredited)

== Development ==
In 1970, Brocka was working with the Philippine Educational Theater Association (PETA) as a director when he was approached by Lea Productions about making a film to be entered into the Manila Film Festival. He adapted Ravelo's comic serial of the same name while also borrowing plot elements from the 1965 film The Sound of Music.

== Reception ==
Award-giving organization	Date of ceremony	Category	Recipient(s)	Result	Ref.
Manila Film Festival	1970	Best Picture	Wanted: Perfect Mother	Won	
Manila Film Festival	1970	Best Actor	Dante Rivero	Won	
Manila Film Festival	1970	Best Screenplay	Lino Brocka	Won	
19th FAMAS Awards	1971	Best Picture	Wanted: Perfect Mother	Nominated	
19th FAMAS Awards	1971	Best Actress	Boots Anson-Roa	Nominated	
19th FAMAS Awards	1971	Best Child Performer	Gina Alajar	Nominated	
19th FAMAS Awards	1971	Best Supporting Actress	Caridad Sanchez	Nominated	
19th FAMAS Awards	1971	Best Cinematography (Color)	Conrado Baltazar	Nominated	
19th FAMAS Awards	1971	Best Musical Score	D'Amarillo	Nominated	
