= 1976 Metro Manila Film Festival =

Annual Philippine Festival edition

- Date: December 25, 1976 to January 3, 1977
- Site: Manila

Highlights
- Best Picture: Ganito Kami Noon... Paano Kayo Ngayon?
- Most awards: Ganito Kami Noon... Paano Kayo Ngayon? (6)

The 2nd Metro Manila Film Festival was held in the year 1976. It was known as 1976 Filipino Film Festival at that time.

Eddie Romero's Ganito Kami Noon, Paano Kayo Ngayon received most of the awards with a total of six including the Best Film and Metro Manila Film Festival Award for Best Actor for Christopher de Leon. Lino Brocka's Insiang received four including Metro Manila Film Festival Award for Best Actress for Hilda Koronel.

A total of 10 movies were exhibited during the 10-day festival which opened for the first time on Christmas Day (December 25). JE Productions' Dateline Chicago: Arrest The Nurse Killer emerged as the Top Grosser.

== Entries ==
Title	Starring	Studio	Director	Genre
Barok	Chiquito, Trixia Gomez, Max Alvarado, Tange, Joaquin Fajardo, Palito, Arlene Sison, Ely Roque, Jun Santos, Norma Yumul, Manuel Dagul	HPS Film Productions	F.H. Constantino	Comedy
Dateline Chicago: Arrest The Nurse Killer	Joseph Estrada, Pilar Pilapil, Mailyn Herrs, Garret Blake, J.C. Marshall, Debbie Brinson	JE Productions	Cesar Gallardo	Action
Ganito Kami Noon... Paano Kayo Ngayon?	Christopher de Leon, Gloria Diaz, Eddie Garcia, Dranreb Belleza, Leopoldo Salcedo, Rosemarie Gil, Johnny Vicar, Tsing-Tong Tsai	Hemisphere	Eddie Romero	Period Drama, Musical, Romance
Insiang	Hilda Koronel, Mona Lisa, Ruel Vernal, Rez Cortez, Marlon Ramirez	Cinemanila	Lino Brocka	Drama
The Interceptors	Tony Ferrer, Ramon Zamora, George Estregan, Edna Diaz, Paquito Diaz, Charlie Davao, Vic Diaz, Max Alvarado	Topaz Film Productions	Efren C. Piñon	Action
Kisame Street	Dolphy, Nida Blanca, Panchito, Rolly Quizon, Katy dela Cruz, Patsy, Georgie Quizon, Bentot, Jr., Margie Braza, Teroy de Guzman	RVQ Productions	Ading Fernando	Comedy
Makahiya at Talahib	Vilma Santos, Rudy Fernandez, Trixia Gomez, Gloria Romero, Romeo Rivera, Rocco Montalban, Robert Rivera, Max Alvarado	Goodwill Productions	Emmanuel Borlaza	Drama
Minsa'y isang Gamu-gamo	Nora Aunor, Jay Ilagan, Gloria Sevilla, Perla Bautista, Eddie Villamayor, Paquito Salcedo, Lily Miraflor, Leo Martinez, Nanding Fernandez, Luz Fernandez	Premiere Productions	Lupita Concio	Protest Drama
Puede Ako, Puwede Ka Pa Ba	Amalia Fuentes, Romeo Vasquez, Eddie Gutierrez, Vivian Velez, Rosemarie Gil, Ike Lozada, Inday Badiday, Cloyd Robinson, Lilian Laing, Sandy Garcia	AM Productions	Elwood Perez & Joey Gosiengfiao	Drama, Romance
The Rebel Hunter (True-to-Life Story of Brig. Gen. Romeo Gatan)	Ramon Revilla, Sr., Boots Anson-Roa, George Estregan, Rodolfo 'Boy' Garcia, Rez Cortez, Max Alvarado	Imus Productions	Jose Yandoc	Action

== Awards ==
Winners are listed first, highlighted with boldface and indicated with a double dagger (‡). Nominees are also listed if applicable.

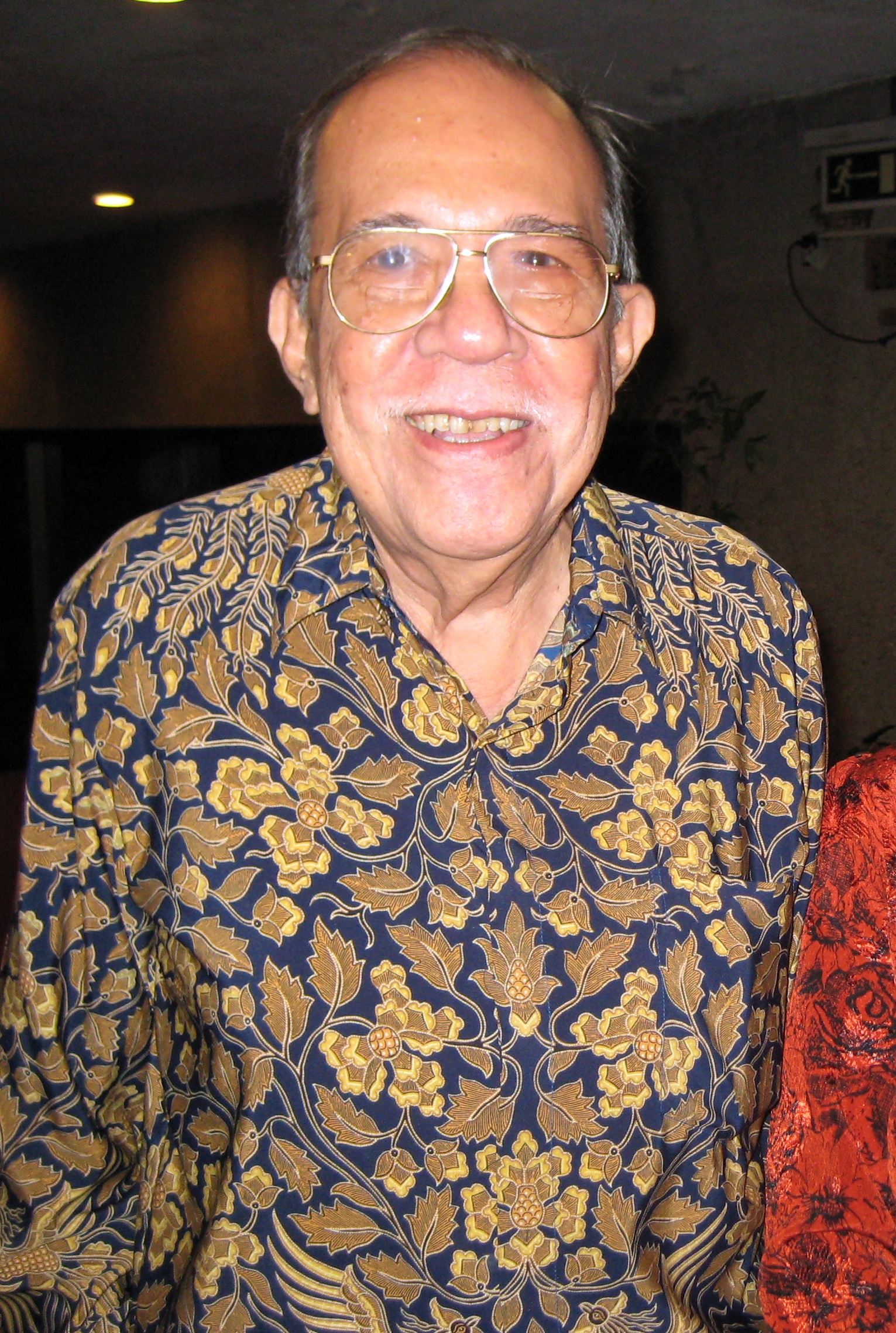
Eddie Romero, Best Director winner and Best Screenplay (with Roy C. Iglesias)

Best Film	Best Director
**Ganito Kami Noon... Paano Kayo Ngayon? – Hemisphere**‡; Minsa'y isang Gamu-gamo – Premiere Productions	**Eddie Romero – Ganito Kami Noon... Paano Kayo Ngayon?**‡; Lupita Aquino-Kashiwahara - Minsa'y isang Gamu-gamo
Best Actor	Best Actress
**Christopher de Leon – Ganito Kami Noon... Paano Kayo Ngayon?**‡	**Hilda Koronel – Insiang**‡
Best Supporting Actor	Best Supporting Actress
**Ruel Vernal – Insiang**‡	**Mona Lisa – Insiang**‡
Best Screenplay	Best Cinematography
**Eddie Romero & Roy C. Iglesias – Ganito Kami Noon... Paano Kayo Ngayon?**‡	**Conrado Baltazar – Insiang**‡
Best Editing	Best Music
**Edgardo Vinarao – Minsa'y isang Gamu-gamo**‡	**Lutgardo Labad – Ganito Kami Noon... Paano Kayo Ngayon?**‡
Best Story	Best Art Direction
**Marina Feleo-Gonzales – Minsa'y isang Gamu-gamo**‡	**Laida Lim-Perez and Peque Gallaga – Ganito Kami Noon... Paano Kayo Ngayon?**‡

== Multiple awards ==
Awards	Film
6	Ganito Kami Noon, Paano Kayo Ngayon
4	Insiang
2	Minsa'y isang Gamu-gamo

Preceded by 1975 Metro Manila Film Festival	Metro Manila Film Festival; 1976	Succeeded by 1977 Metro Manila Film Festival
