= Nasaan Ka Man =

2005 romantic horror thriller film by Cholo Laurel

- Theatrical release poster
- Directed by: Cholo Laurel
- Written by: Ricky Lee; Rafael Hidalgo
- Produced by: Charo Santos-Concio; Malou N. Santos
- Starring: Claudine Barretto; Jericho Rosales; Diether Ocampo
- Cinematography: Charlie Peralta
- Edited by: Marya Ignacio
- Music by: Jessie Lasaten
- Production companies: Star Cinema; Cinemedia
- Distributed by: ABS-CBN Film Productions
- Release date: June 15, 2005
- Running time: 107 minutes
- Country: Philippines
- Language: Filipino
- Box office: ₱110 million

Nasaan Ka Man (lit. 'Wherever You Are') is a 2005 Filipino romantic drama horror thriller film directed by Cholo Laurel in his feature directorial debut from a story and screenplay written by Ricky Lee and Rafael Hidalgo. The film stars Claudine Barretto, Jericho Rosales and Diether Ocampo in the lead roles, while Hilda Koronel, Gloria Diaz, and Dante Rivero in the supporting roles.

Set in the mystical and fog-covered outskirts of Baguio, the film is a love story about a family shrouded in secrets. As the secrets are revealed, the family learns to let go of their hatred and forgive each other. It tackles incestuous relationships, necrophilia, and other unpleasant themes that the film studio dared not go too far.

A co-production of ABS-CBN Film Productions and Cinemedia, the film was theatrically released on June 15, 2005. In March 2017, ABS-CBN Film Restoration Project released a digitally restored and remastered version of the film on iTunes in over 43 countries. The restoration process was made possible with the help of the Central Digital Lab.

== Plot ==
The plot centers on a trio of adopted children, Pilar, Ito, and Joven, and the spinster sisters, Lilia and Trining, who raised them. Despite the family's veneer of happiness, closer inspection reveals a clan that's cloaked in secrets.

Pilar and Joven are having a secret romantic relationship. Joven proposed to Pilar, who was found out by Ito. During the New Year's Eve celebration, Pilar and Joven asked for the blessing of their adoptive mother, Lilia, and her younger sister, Trining. Surprised, Lilia heavily opposed the couple being wed, for it is incestuous despite not being blood-related, and hiding their relationship from her. Trining, on the other hand, supported the couple.

Later that night, Trining reminded Lilia about the latter's relationship with Nardo and how their father opposed the marriage. Lilia and Nardo tried to elope, but they were chased by the police. The ensuing pursuit killed Nardo after being shot by the police, which resulted in the sisters leaving their father.

The next day, Lilia, realizing the similarities between her past and the couple, gave her blessing, infuriating Ito. Lilia confronted Ito, revealing that he has obsessive feelings for Pilar. Sometime after, Ito kills a cat for no reason and rapes their maid's daughter, Lydia. Later, Joven, Pilar, Lilia, and Trining left the house for a local festival, leaving Ito alone. While at the festival, Pilar becomes ill and is driven home by Joven. Joven, about to pick up the sisters, left Pilar at home to rest. Ito realizes he is alone with Pilar and takes the chance to rape her. Joven, Lilia, and Trining arrived home and saw Ito flustered and running away. Joven followed Ito, and the sisters went inside and found Pilar in a miserable state.

When Joven found out what happened to Pilar, he confronted Ito on a nearby cliff. The two brothers fought until Ito was about to fall off the cliff, only to be saved by Joven. Pilar arrived at the scene, and Joven, caught off guard by Ito, was pushed to the cliff. Angry at what Ito did, Pilar pushed Ito to the cliff as well. The sisters, however, are not aware of the fate of the boys and search for them. Later that night, Lilia warned all her connections to tell her in case one of the boys knocked on their doors. While praying, Pilar saw Ito's figure scaring her and was comforted by an unscathed Joven, who emerged from the door, and the sisters thought that Pilar was hallucinating.

The doctor said that the trauma caused the hallucinations and that Pilar is pregnant, resulting from Ito's sexual assault on her. Fearing that Ito might come back, Pilar decided to elope with Joven. In the bus station, Joven was told by an old man sitting next to him that he knew Lilia and Trining. The old man told Joven to return home and find a pile of hospital bills in the basement of their home. Pilar, while buying snacks before boarding, saw figures of Ito and became too scared to move. Joven asked Pilar to go home and look for the bills the old man was talking about.

It was revealed that the old man was Lilia and Trining's father, Don Augusto, and the bills contained a letter for the sisters. It was also revealed that he is not opposing Lilia and Nardo's relationship, but Augusto found out that Trining was raped by Nardo. Augusto never intended to kill Nardo; the police were to shoot Nardo to cripple him and pay for his crime. When Trining gave birth, Augusto decided to give the baby to an orphanage to cleanse the child from the sins of Nardo, and that baby was revealed to be Pilar.

Ito revealed himself to Pilar, Trining, and Lilia, showing that he was alive all along. Ito, now mentally unstable with his obsession, tied the women and was about to start a killing frenzy. As Ito was about to rape Pilar again, Lilia was able to untie herself and hit Ito with a shovel, knocking him unconscious. Pilar looked for Joven for help. As Pilar and Joven hugged each other, the sister asked who Pilar was talking to. Pilar realized that she was only talking to Joven's spirit. Pilar's love for Joven stops Joven's spirit from passing on, and Joven is in denial of his death. It was revealed that Joven is unconscious after he falls from the cliff, and Ito, who gained consciousness first, delivered the killing blow by hitting Joven's head with a rock. In denial of his death, he is confronted by Augusto, who reveals himself to be dead also, to let Pilar go so Joven's spirit can pass on.

In the final scene, Pilar, still lonely about Joven's death, cries next to his grave, which lies next to Lilia and Trining's parents. The sisters cleaned their father's grave as a sign of their forgiveness, and Ito is detained in a mental institution. The following day, Joven revealed himself to Pilar, who is now taking care of their son, one last time, showing their love for each other wherever they were. After their goodbyes, Joven and Augusto's spirits passed on.

== Cast ==
=== Main cast ===
- Claudine Barretto as Pilar
- Jericho Rosales as Joven
- Diether Ocampo as Ito

=== Supporting cast ===
- Hilda Koronel as Trining
- Gloria Diaz as Lilia
- Dante Rivero as Don Augusto
- Irma Adlawan as Abling
- Jhong Hilario as Nardo
- Katherine Luna as Lydia
- Lovely Rivero as Joven's mother
- Chiqui Del Carmen as Don Augusto's wife
- Kokoy Palma as Priest
- Tony Roma as Doctor
- Carmen Valencia as Komadrona
- Lito Joyas as Policeman
- Joselito Leuterio as Policeman

=== Guest cast ===
- Joshua Dionisio as Young Ito
- Kathryn Bernardo as Young Pilar
- Sean Ignacio as Young Joven
- Neri Naig as Young Lilia
- Rochelle Cabaltica as Young Trining

== Reception ==
=== Critical response ===
The film received widespread critical acclaim since its release. It was graded "B" by the Cinema Evaluation Board upon its release, stating that "the acting was uniformly top-notch. The script, editing, cinematography, and production designs were excellent. Cholo Laurel was able, sensitive, and imaginative."

Butch Francisco, a columnist from The Philippine Star, described Nasaan Ka Man as "a finely crafted movie, creative yet realistic", with slight similarities to the films Wuthering Heights, Hush...Hush, Sweet Charlotte, The Sixth Sense, The Others, and Nick Joaquin's A Portrait of the Artist as Filipino due to the roles of Gloria Diaz and Hilda Koronel as the sisters. Gigi Javier-Alfonso, writing for The Daily Tribune, stated that Nasaan Ka Man is tagged as the film studio's dramatic cinematic project, with praise towards its powerhouse cast and screenplay by Ricky Lee and Rafael Hidalgo that is well-written in making a romantic thriller. JT Trinidad, writing for Sinegang PH, gave a positive retrospective review and a four-star rating.

=== Accolades ===
Award-giving organization	Date of ceremony	Category	Recipient(s)	Result	Ref.
Gawad Urian Awards	August 3, 2006	Best Supporting Actress	Hilda Koronel	Won	
24th Luna Awards	September 19, 2006	Best Picture	Nasaan Ka Man	Nominated	
24th Luna Awards	September 19, 2006	Best Editing	Marya Ignacio	Won	
24th Luna Awards	September 19, 2006	Best Cinematography	Charlie Peralta	Won	
24th Luna Awards	September 19, 2006	Best Sound	Addiss Tabong	Won	
24th Luna Awards	September 19, 2006	Best Supporting Actress	Hilda Koronel	Won	
24th Luna Awards	September 19, 2006	Best Actress	Claudine Barretto	Nominated	
24th Luna Awards	September 19, 2006	Best Director	Cholo Laurel	Nominated	
24th Luna Awards	September 19, 2006	Best Production Design	John Cuyson	Nominated	
24th Luna Awards	September 19, 2006	Best Musical Score	Jessie Lasaten	Nominated	
24th Luna Awards	September 19, 2006	Best Supporting Actress	Irma Adlawan	Nominated	
54th FAMAS Awards	November 12, 2006	Best Picture	Nasaan Ka Man	Won	
54th FAMAS Awards	November 12, 2006	Best Director	Cholo Laurel	Won	
54th FAMAS Awards	November 12, 2006	Best Actress	Claudine Barretto	Won	
54th FAMAS Awards	November 12, 2006	Best Supporting Actress	Gloria Diaz	Won	
54th FAMAS Awards	November 12, 2006	Best Story	Ricky Lee and Cholo Laurel	Won	
54th FAMAS Awards	November 12, 2006	Best Screenplay	Ricky Lee and Cholo Laurel	Won	
54th FAMAS Awards	November 12, 2006	Best Cinematography	Charlie Peralta	Won	
54th FAMAS Awards	November 12, 2006	Best Musical Score	Jessie Lasaten	Won	
54th FAMAS Awards	November 12, 2006	Best Sound	Addiss Tabong	Nominated	
54th FAMAS Awards	November 12, 2006	Best Art Direction	John Cuyson	Nominated	
54th FAMAS Awards	November 12, 2006	Best Actor	Jericho Rosales	Nominated	
54th FAMAS Awards	November 12, 2006	Best Supporting Actress	Hilda Koronel	Nominated	
54th FAMAS Awards	November 12, 2006	Best Theme Song	Nasaan Ka Man by Christian Bautista	Won	
Gawad Tanglaw Awards	2006	Best Director	Cholo Laurel	Won	
Gawad Tanglaw Awards	2006	Best Supporting Actor	Diether Ocampo	Won	

== Soundtrack ==
An accompanying soundtrack for the movie was also released and performed by Filipino singer Christian Bautista.

=== Track listing ===
1. Nasaan Ka Man
2. Nasaan Ka Man (Minus One)
3. Nasaan Ka Man (Movie Trailer Edit)
4. Nasaan Ka Man (Music Video)
