= 1976 FAMAS Awards =

Annual Filipino awards for achievements in film

24th FAMAS Awards
- Date: 1976
- Site: Philippines

Highlights
- Best Picture: Maynila.. Sa Kuko ng Liwanag ~ Cinema Artist
- Most awards: Maynila.. Sa Kuko ng Liwanag ~ Cinema Artist ( 9 wins)
- Most nominations: Maynila.. Sa Kuko ng Liwanag ~ Cinema Artist ( 11 nominations)

The 24th Filipino Academy of Movie Arts and Sciences Awards Night was held in 1976. The event recognized the outstanding achievements in Filipino film for 1975.

Maynila.. Sa Kuko ng Liwanag of Cinema Artist was the most nominated film with eleven (11) nominations and the most awarded with 9 wins including FAMAS Award for Best Picture and the Best Director for Lino Brocka. This is the second year in a row for Brocka to win both Best Director and his film as Best Picture.

This year, FAMAS elevated five (5) individuals to Hall of Famer Status for winning a specific award 5 times or more. They are Eddie Garcia for Best Supporting Actor, Gerardo de Leon for Best Director, Tony Maiquez for Musical Scorer, Angel Avellana and Demetrio de Santos for Best in Sound Recording.

== Awards ==
=== Major Awards ===
Winners are listed first and highlighted with boldface.

Best Picture	Best Director
**Maynila.. Sa Kuko ng Liwanag — Cinema Arts**; Banaue: Stairway to the Sky — NV Productions; Hatulan kung Kasalanan — Emperor Films; Lumapit, lumayo ang umaga — Lea Productions; Saan ka Pupunta, Miss Lutgarda Nicolas?: — Silver Films	**Lino Brocka — Maynila.. Sa Kuko ng Liwanag**; Fernando Poe Jr. — Alupihang Dagat; Augusto Buenaventura — Diligin Mo ng Hamog ang Uhaw na Lupa; Ishmael Bernal — Lumapit, Lumayo ang Umaga
Best Actor	Best Actress
**Bembol Roco — Maynila.. Sa Kuko ng Liwanag**; Christopher De Leon — Banaue: Stairway to the Sky; Dante Rivero — Lumapit, lumayo ang umaga; George Estregan — 'Lumapit, lumayo ang Umaga; Eddie Garcia — Mister Mo, Lover Boy Ko	**Elizabeth Oropesa — Lumapit, lumayo ang Umaga**; Nora Aunor — Banaue: Stairway to the Sky; Charito Solis — Araw-araw, Gabi-gabi: Hilda Koronel — Maynila.. Sa Kuko ng Liwanag; Boots Anson-Roa — Saan ka Pupunta, Miss Lutgarda Nicolas?
Best Supporting Actor	Best Supporting Actress
**Tommy Abuel — Maynila.. Sa Kuko ng Liwanag**; Tony Santos — Araw-araw, Gabi-gabi; Johnny Delgado — Banaue: Stairway to the Sky; Vic Silayan — Diligin mo ng hamog ang uhaw na Lupa; Lito Anzures — Ang madugong daigdig ni Salvacion	**Anna Gonzales — Sa kagubatan ng Lunsod**; Rosanna Ortiz — Ala-ala Mo, daigdig ko; Gloria Sevilla — Banaue: Stairway to the Sky; Lily Gamboa Mendoza — Maynila.. Sa Kuko ng Liwanag; Paraluman — Mister Mo, Lover Boy Ko
Best Child Performer	Best Theme Song
**Melissa Sarosario — Araw-Araw, Gabi-Gab**; Mercy Bartolome — Banaue: Stairway to the Sky; Eddie Villamayor — Banaue: Stairway to the Sky	**Willy Cruz — Araw-Araw, Gabi-Gabi**
Best in Screenplay	Best Story
**Clodualdo Del Mundo Jr. — Maynila.. Sa Kuko ng Liwanag**	**Edgardo M. Reyes — Maynila.. Sa Kuko ng Liwanag**
Best Sound	Best Musical Score
**Ramon Reyes — Maynila.. Sa Kuko ng Liwanag**	**Ernani Cuenco — Diligin mo ng hamog ang uhaw na Lupa**
Best Cinematography	Best Production Design
**Mike de Leon — Maynila.. Sa Kuko ng Liwanag**	**— Banaue: Stairway to the Sky**
Best Editing	Best Production Design
**Ike Jarlego, Jr. — Maynila.. Sa Kuko ng Liwanag**	**— Banaue: Stairway to the Sky**

=== Special Awardee ===
- **Dr. Ciriaco Santiago Memorial Award**
  - **Teodoro Valencia**

- **Lou Salvador, Sr. Memorial Award**
  - **Pugo**

- **Special Award**
  - **Lamberto V. Avellana & Joseph Estrada**

- Posthumous Awards:
  - **Guillermo C. de Vega** (Presidential Assistant) & Chairman, Board of Censors
  - **Romeo Arceo** ~ Former Famas President
  - **Dr. Jose R. Perez** ~ (producer, Sampaguita Pictures, Inc.)
- **Hall of Fame Awardees**

**Eddie Garcia - Supporting Actor**

  - 1973 - Nueva Vizcaya
  - 1969 - Patria Adorada
  - 1966 - Ito Ang Pilipino
  - 1959 - Tanikalang Apoy
  - 1958 - Condenado
  - 1957 - Taga Sa Bato

**Gerardo de Leon - Director**

  - 1971 - Lilet
  - 1965 - Ang Daigdig Ng Mga Api
  - 1962 - El Filibusterismo
  - 1961 - Noli me Tangere
  - 1960 - Huwag Mo Akong Limutin
  - 1958 - Hanggang Sa Dulo Ng Daigdig
  - 1952 - Bagong Umaga

**Tony Maiquez - Musical Score**

  - 1967 - Kapag Puso'y Sinugatan
  - 1965 - Iginuhit Sa Buhangin
  - 1963 - Sapagka't Kami'y Tao Lamang
  - 1958 - Water Lily
  - 1957 - Yaya Maria
  - 1956 - 5 Hermanos
  - 1955 - Pandora
  - 1954 - Guwapo

**Angel Avellana - Sound Recording**

  - 1974 - Ang Pinakamagandang Hayop Sa Balat Ng Lupa
  - 1973 - Hanggang Sa Kabila Ng Daigdig
  - 1972 - Kill The Pushers
  - 1971 - Asedillo
  - 1969 - Pinagbuklod Ng Langit

**Demetrio de Santos - Sound Recording**

  - 1970 - Rodolfo Valentino
  - 1966 - The Passionate Strangers
  - 1960 - Huwag Mo Akong Limutin
  - 1958 - The Singing Idol
  - 1957 - Kalibre .45
  - 1956 - Desperado
