= Santiago! (film) =

1970 war drama film by Lino Brocka

- Theatrical film poster
- Directed by: Lino Brocka
- Screenplay by: Lino Brocka
- Produced by: Emilia Blas
- Starring: Fernando Poe Jr.; Dante Rivero; Boots Anson-Roa; Hilda Koronel; Jay Ilagan
- Cinematography: Conrado Baltazar
- Edited by: Felizardo Santos
- Music by: Doming Valdez
- Production company: Lea Productions
- Distributed by: Lea Productions
- Release date: 13 November 1970
- Running time: 113 minutes
- Country: Philippines
- Language: Filipino

Santiago! is a 1970 Philippine war drama written and directed by Lino Brocka and starring Fernando Poe Jr. as a guerrilla soldier during the Japanese occupation of the Philippines. It is the first film to include Hilda Koronel in a credited role, for which she won Best Supporting Actress at the 1971 FAMAS Awards at the age of 13. She would go on to act in seventeen of Brocka's films.

== Plot ==
Set in the Philippines during the Japanese occupation, a Filipino soldier, who is guilt-ridden over an incident that killed many civilians, deserts the rebel army and retreats to a nearby barrio where he is branded as a coward.

== Cast ==
- Fernando Poe Jr. as Gonzalo
- Dante Rivero as Celso
- Boots Anson-Roa as Lydia
- Hilda Koronel as Cristina
- Jay Ilagan as Danilo
- Caridad Sanchez as Pilar
- Mary Walter as Andang
- Ruben Rustia as Capt. Santos
- Mario O'Hara as Diego
- Joonee Gamboa as Desto
- Lorli Villanueva as Villager
- Angie Ferro as Villager
- Corazon Noble as Celso's mother
- Cecilia Bulaong as Celso's sister
- Lily Gamboa as Celso's sister
- Celeste Legaspi as Daughter of Makapili
- Marzya Ilagan as Daughter of Makapili
- Mildred Ortega as Celso's sister
- Silvestre Tecson as Villager
- Ursula Carlos as Villager
- Rosa Santos as Villager
- Inday de la Cruz as Villager
- Tina Lava as Villager
- Luis Benedicto as Celso's father
- Pons de Guzman as Makapili
- Fred Esplana as Japanese/Guerrillas
- Burke Perdiz as Japanese/Guerrillas
- Ely Perez as Japanese/Guerrillas
- Roland Falcis as Japanese/Guerrillas

== Production ==
Scenes from the film were shot in Magdalena, Laguna.

== Reception ==
=== Accolades ===
Award-giving organization	Date of ceremony	Category	Recipient(s)	Result	Ref.
19th FAMAS Awards	1971	Best Picture	Santiago!	Nominated	
19th FAMAS Awards	1971	Best Actor	Fernando Poe Jr.	Nominated	
19th FAMAS Awards	1971	Best Supporting Actor	Jay Ilagan	Nominated	
19th FAMAS Awards	1971	Best Supporting Actress	Hilda Koronel	Won	
