= 1971 FAMAS Awards =

Annual Filipino film awards ceremony

19th FAMAS Awards
- Date: May 22, 1971
- Site: Philippines
- Hosted by: Fred Montilla and Boots Anson-Roa

Highlights
- Best Picture: Mga Anghel na Walang Langit (FPJ Productions)
- Most awards: Mga Anghel na Walang Langit (6 wins)

The 19th Filipino Academy of Movie Arts and Sciences Awards Night was held in 1971 and recognized the outstanding achievements in the Filipino movie industry for the year 1970.

Mga Anghel na Walang Langit of FPJ Productions a movie about the life of street children won the most awards with 6 wins including the FAMAS Award for Best Picture and Best Story for Ronwaldo Reyes. This is the first movie where FPJ used the name Ronwaldo Reyes. Except for close associates in the production, no one knew who Ronwaldo Reyes was until the FAMAS awarding when Reyes was declared the winner for best story. FPJ appeared and revealed himself as the man behind the name. Since then, he had been using the name in his writing and directorial credit. Eddie Garcia was nominated in 3 different categories; Best Director for Crisis, best actor for Tubog sa Ginto (winner) and Best Supporting Actor for Pipo.

== Awards ==
=== Major Awards ===
Winners are listed first and highlighted with boldface.

Best Picture	Best Director
**Mga Anghel na walang Langit — FPJ Productions**; Psycho Sex Killer — Emar Pictures; Santiago! — Lea Productions; Tubog sa Ginto — Lea Productions; Wanted: Perfect Mother — Lea Productions	**Lino Brocka — Tubog sa Ginto**; Armando De Guzman — Mga Anghel na Walang Langit; Eddie Rodriguez — Bakit Ako Pa?; Eddie Garcia— Crisis; Augusto Buenaventura — Psycho Sex Killer
Best Actor	Best Actress
**Eddie Garcia** — Tubog sa Ginto; Eddie Rodriguez — My Little Angel; George Estregan — Psycho Sex Killer; Fernando Poe Jr. — Santiago!; Dante Rivero — Wanted: Perfect Mother	**Rita Gomez — Bakit Ako Pa?**; Lolita Rodriguez — Tubog sa Ginto; Susan Roces — Divina Gracia; Gloria Sevilla — Dodong ko; Boots Anson-Roa — Wanted: Perfect Mother
Best Supporting Actor	Best Supporting Actress
**Amado Cortez — Bakit ako Pa?**; Eddie Garcia — Pipo; Ruben Rustia — Psycho Sex Killer; Jay Ilagan — Santiago!; Mario O'Hara — Tubog sa Ginto	**Hilda Koronel — Santiago!**; Diana Dean — My Little Angel; Linda Martin — Psycho Sex Killer; Caridad Sanchez — Wanted Perfect Mother
Best Child Performer	Best Editing
**Roderick Paulate — Mga Anghel na Walang Langit**; Frankie Navaja Jr. — Dodong Ko; Snooky Serna — My Little Angel; Gina Alajar — Wanted Perfect Mother	**Augusto Salvador — Mga Anghel na Walang Langit**
Best in Screenplay	Best Story
**Augusto Buenaventura — Psycho Sex Killer**	**Ronwaldo Reyes — (Mga Anghel na Walang Langit**
Best Sound	Best Musical Score
**Demetrio de Santo — Mga Anghel na Walang Langit**	**Restie Umali — Mga Anghel na Walang Langit**
Best Cinematography (Black and White)	Best Cinematography (Colored)
**Freddie Conde — Psycho Sex Killer**	**Loreto Isleta — Pipo**

=== Special Awardee ===
- **Dr. Ciriaco Santiago Memorial Award**
  - **Eddie Romero**
