= 1970 FAMAS Awards =

Annual Filipino film awards ceremony

18th FAMAS Awards
- Date: 1970
- Site: Philippines

Highlights
- Best Picture: Pinagbuklod ng Langit (United Brothers Productions)
- Most awards: Pinagbuklod ng Langit (8 wins)

The 18th Filipino Academy of Movie Arts and Sciences Awards Night was held in 1970. The event recognized outstanding achievements in the Filipino movie industry for the year 1969.

Pinagbuklod ng Langit by United Brothers Productions was a movie about the life and love story of then President Ferdinand Marcos and First Lady Imelda Marcos won the most awards with 8 wins including the FAMAS Award for Best Picture and Best Director for Eddie Garcia. Garcia also won the Best Supporting Actor Award for the movie Dugo ng Bayani.

== Awards ==
=== Major Awards ===
Winners are listed first and highlighted with boldface.

| Best Picture | Best Director |
|---|---|
| **Pinagbuklod ng Langit — United Brothers Production**; Adriana — Lea Productions; Badlis sa Kinabuhi — MG Productions; Ikaw — Virgo Film Productions; Dugo ng Bayani — Emar Pictures and Regina Productions | **Eddie Garcia — Pinagbuklod ng Pag-ibig**; Leroy Salvador — Badlis sa Kinabuhi; Eddie Rodriguez — Ikaw; Emmanuel Borlaza — Kapatid ko ang Aking Ina; Augusto Buenaventura — Dugo ng Bayani |
| Best Actor | Best Actress |
| **Joseph Estrada** — **Dugo ng Bayani**; Dante Rivero — Adriana; Eddie Rodriguez — Ikaw; Dolphy — Pagibig, masdan mo ang Ginawa Mo; Vic Vargas — Perlas ng Silangan; Luis Gonzales — Pinagbuklod ng Pagibig | **Gloria Sevilla — Badlis sa Kinabuhi**; Lolita Rodriguez — Ikaw; Amalia Fuentes — Kapatid ko ang aking Ina; Charito Solis — Ang Pulubi |
| Best Supporting Actor | Best Supporting Actress |
| **Eddie Garcia — Dugo ng Bayani**; Danilo Nuñez — Badlis sa Kinabuhi; Oscar Roncal — Eric; Renato Robles — Ikaw; Roldan Aquino — Nasaan ang Katarungan | **Eva Darren — Ang Pulubi**; Lourdes Medel — Adriana; Anita Linda — Bimbo; Matimtiman Cruz — Kapatid ko ang aking Ina; Carina Afable — Dugo ng Bayani |
| Best Child Performer | Best Theme Song |
| **Frankie Navaja Jr. — Badlis sa Kinabuhi** | **Restie Umali — Pinagbuklod ngP agibig** |
| Best in Screenplay | Best Story |
| **Emmanuel Borlaza — Pinagbuklod ng Pagibig** | **Elena Patron — (Kapatid Ko Ang Aking Ina** |
| Best Sound | Best Musical Score |
| **Angel Avellana — Pinagbuklod ng Pagibig** | **Restie Umali — Pinagbuklod ng Pagibig** |
| Best Cinematography (black and White) | Best Cinematography (Colored) |
| **Max de la Pena — Sibasib** | **Felipe Sacdalan — Pinagbuklod ng Pagibig** |
| Best Editing | |
| **Jose Tarnate — Pinagbuklod ng Pagibig** | |
