= 1973 FAMAS Awards =

Annual Filipino film awards ceremony

21st FAMAS Awards
- Date: 1973
- Site: Philippines
- Hosted by: Tina Revilla

Highlights
- Best Picture: Kill the Pushers (JE Productions)
- Most awards: Kill the Pushers (Pacific Movie Productions) (4 wins)
- Most nominations: Babae... Ikaw ang Dahilan (9 nominations)

The 21st Filipino Academy of Movie Arts and Sciences Awards Night was held in 1973 for the Outstanding Achievements for the year 1972.

Kill the Pushers of JE Productions won the most coveted FAMAS Award for Best Picture award. It was also the first time that the academy gave two best actress awards, to Vilma Santos for Dama de Noche and Boots Anson Roa for Tatay na si Erap. The FAMAS was rocked by a terrible scandal, because a tie was unheard of, the public dissented the vote. Therefore, for the next years, the FAMAS invited film critics to be members of its nominating and awarding committee.

== Awards ==
=== Major Awards ===
Winners are listed first and highlighted with boldface.

| Best Picture | Best Director |
|---|---|
| **Kill the Pushers — JE Productions Productions**; Ang Alamar — FPJ Productions; Babae... Ikaw ang Dahilan — Virgo Film Productions; Mahalin mo Sana Ako — Virgo Film Productions; Tatay na si Erap — JE Productions; Villa Miranda — JE Productions | **Augusto Buenaventura — Kill the Pushers**; Celso Ad. Castillo — Ang Alamat; Eddie Rodriguez — Babae... Ikaw ang Dahilan; Manuel 'Fyke' Cinco — Isinilang ang Anak ng Ibang Babae; Tony Cayado — Nardong Putik; Armando Garces — Sukdulan; Lino Brocka — Villa Miranda |
| Best Actor | Best Actress |
| **George Estregan — Sukdulan**; Fernando Poe Jr. — Ang Alamat; Eddie Rodriguez — Babae... Ikaw ang Dahilan; Jun Aristorenas — Elias, Basilio at Sisa; Joseph Estrada — Kill thePushers; Ramon Revilla — Nardong Putik; Dante Rivero — Villa Miranda | **Boots Anson Roa — Tatay na si Erap**; **Vilma Santos — Dama de Noche**; Nora Aunor — And God Smiled at Me; Marlene Daudén — Babae... Ikaw ang Dahilan; Amalia Fuentes — Babae... Ikaw ang Dahilan; Susan Roces — Bilangguang Puso; Pilar Pilapil — Isinilang ang Anakng Ibang Babae |
| Best Supporting Actor | Best Supporting Actress |
| **Nick Romano — Tatlong Mukha ni Rosa Vilma**; Eddie Garcia — Till Death Do Us Part; Romy Diaz — Ang Alamat; Jose Padilla Jr. — Ang Alamat; Eddie Mercado — Dito sa Aking PUso; Ruben Rustia — Kill the Pushers; Lou Salvador Jr. — Villa Miranda | **Marissa Delgado — Till Death Do Us Part**; Mary Walter — Babae... Ikaw ang Dahilan; Alicia Alonzo — Villa Miranda; Zenaida Amador — Kill the Pushers; Chichay — Bilangguang Puso; Cristina Reyes — Sukdulan; Ely Roque — Tatay na si Erap |
| Best Child Actor | Best Child Actress |
| **Robin Aristorenas — Elias, Basilio at Sisa**; Frankie Navaja Jr. — Ang Alamat; Randy — Isinilang ang anak ng ibang babae; Marlon Bautista — Nardong Putik | **Snooky Serna — Mahalin mo Sana Ako**; Jingle — Babae.. Ikaw ang Dahilan; Mari-Cris — Babae.. Ikaw ang Dahilan; Beth Manlongat — Tatlong mukha ni Rosa Vilma |
| Best in Screenplay | Best Story |
| **Eddie Rodriguez — Mahalin mo Sana ako**; **Augusto Buenaventura — Kill the Pushers** | **Liza Moreno — Babae... Ikaw ang Dahilan** |
| Best Sound Engineering | Best Musical Score |
| **Angel Avellana — Kill the Pushers** | **Restie Umali — Ang Alamat** |
| Best Cinematography (black and White) | Best Cinematography (Colored) |
| **Ricardo Remias — Babae.. Ikaw ang Dahilan** | **Nonong Rasca — nardong PUtik** |
| Best Editing | |
| **Marcilino Navarro — Nardong Putik** | |

=== Special Awardee ===
- **Dr. Ciriaco Santiago Memorial Award**
  - **Dr. Jose R. Perez**
