= Tubog sa Ginto =

1970 film by Lino Brocka

- Directed by: Lino Brocka
- Screenplay by: Lino Brocka
- Based on: Tubog sa Ginto by Mars Ravelo
- Produced by: Emilia Blas
- Starring: Lolita Rodriguez; Eddie Garcia; Luis Gonzales; Hilda Koronel; Jay Ilagan
- Cinematography: Steve Perez
- Edited by: Felizardo Santos
- Music by: Doming Valdez
- Production company: Lea Productions
- Distributed by: Lea Productions
- Release date: 25 December 1970
- Running time: 120 minutes
- Country: Philippines
- Language: Filipino

Tubog sa Ginto (English: Dipped in Gold) is a 1970 Philippine drama film written and directed by Lino Brocka, based on the comics serial of the same name by Mars Ravelo. It starred Eddie Garcia as a married businessman and a closeted homosexual who committed an affair with the driver. It co-stars Lolita Rodriguez, Mario O'Hara, Jay Ilagan, Hilda Koronel, Luis Gonzales, and Marissa Delgado.

Produced and distributed by Lea Productions, the film was theatrically released on December 25, 1970.

== Plot ==
Don Benito is a successful entrepreneur married to Doña Emma and father to their son, Santi. Don Benito starts a love affair with the family driver Diego. As the affair between Don Benito and Diego continues, Doña Emma grows dissatisfied with the marriage and starts a series of affairs with other men.

Teenage lovers Santi and Joni accidentally discover Doña Emma's and Don Benito's respective love affairs. Diego tries to blackmail Don Benito by hiring a photographer to record their trysts. Instead of paying off Diego, Don Benito loses his money by gambling. Failing to get money from Don Benito, Diego seduces Doña Emma.

== Cast ==
- Lolita Rodriguez as Emma
- Eddie Garcia as Don Benito
- Luis Gonzales as Celso
- Hilda Koronel as Joni
- Jay Ilagan as Santi
- Marissa Delgado as Gracita
- Mario O'Hara as Diego
- Veronica Palileo as Chichi
- Joonee Gamboa as Brix
- Joe Avelino
- Lorli Villanueva
- Angie Ferro
- Tony Carreon
- Glenn Bernardo
- Josie Perez
- Baby Jimenez
- Inday dela Cruz
- Lito Franquelli

== Production ==
The film was based on a comics serial created and written by Mars Ravelo and illustrated by Elpidio Torres, published in Tagalog Klasiks.

According to film critic Hammy Sotto, Tubog sa Ginto received an invitation to participate in the 1972 Venice Film Festival, but Lea Productions refused the invitation.

== Reception ==
=== Accolades ===
Award-giving organization	Date of ceremony	Category	Recipient(s)	Result	Ref.
19th FAMAS Awards	22 May 1971	Best Picture	Tubog sa Ginto	Nominated	
19th FAMAS Awards	22 May 1971	Best Director	Lino Brocka	Won	
19th FAMAS Awards	22 May 1971	Best Actor	Eddie Garcia	Won	
19th FAMAS Awards	22 May 1971	Best Actress	Lolita Rodriguez	Nominated	
19th FAMAS Awards	22 May 1971	Best Supporting Actor	Mario O'Hara	Nominated	
19th FAMAS Awards	22 May 1971	Best Story	Mars Ravelo	Nominated	
19th FAMAS Awards	22 May 1971	Best Screenplay	Lino Brocka	Nominated	
19th FAMAS Awards	22 May 1971	Best Cinematography (Color)	Steve Perez	Nominated	
19th FAMAS Awards	22 May 1971	Best Editing	Felizardo Santos	Nominated	
19th FAMAS Awards	22 May 1971	Best Musical Score	Doming Valdez	Nominated	
