= Lamberto Antonio =

Filipino writer (1946–2024)

Lamberto E. Antonio (November 9, 1946 – July 6, 2024) was a Filipino writer from Cabiao, Nueva Ecija.

== Biography ==
Opposite Mario O'Hara, he co-wrote the screenplay for Lino Brocka's film Insiang (1976), the first Philippine film to be shown at the Cannes Film Festival in 1978. He was the author of several critically acclaimed books - Hagkis ng Talahib (1971), Pagsalubong sa Habagat (1986 National Book Award for Poetry), and Pingkian at Apat Pang Aklat ng Tunggalian (1997 National Book Award for Poetry).

A Palanca awardee 10 times over, he also won the grand prize for the Epic Narrative in the Cultural Center of the Philippines Literary Competition, and was hailed Makata ng Taon by the Surian ng Wikang Pambansa. He also received the Gawad Manuel L. Quezon and Pambansang Alagad ni Balagtas.

His other accomplishments include the translation of the literary works of Gabriel García Márquez, Dylan Thomas, Octavio Paz, Rainer Maria Rilke, Arthur Conan Doyle, Léopold Sédar Senghor, Salvatore Quasimodo, Usman Awang, and Rabindranath Tagore. He also translated Renato Constantino's A Past Revisited (Ang Bagong Lumipas) in 1997 and served as editor-in-chief of Diyaryo Filipino and Kabayan broadsheets and Pilosopong Tasyo magazine.

Antonio died on July 6, 2024, at the age of 77.

== Pingkian at Apat Pang Aklat ng Tunggalian ==
A recipient of major awards for his poetry and prose, Antonio presented his third collection of poems. Antonio was described by a critic as the most persuasive voice in contemporary Tagalog poetry, a poet who spoke for the oppressed, whether peasant or worker, without any touch of affectation.

Antonio's Pingkian at Apat Pang Aklat ng Tunggalian won 1997 National Book Award for Poetry and was 1998 Gintong Aklat Awardee for Literature.
