= Mona Lisa (actress) =

Filipino film actress (1922–2019)

- Born: Gloria Lerma Yatco; June 22, 1922; Tondo, Manila, Philippine Islands
- Died: August 25, 2019 (aged 97); Manila, Philippines
- Other names: Fleur de Lis, Gloria Guinto
- Occupation: Actress
- Years active: 1930–2005
- Awards: FAMAS Best Supporting Actress; 1975 Insiang; Gawad Urian; 1999 Lifetime Achievement Award

Gloria Lerma Yatco (June 22, 1922 – August 25, 2019), better known by her stage name Mona Lisa, was a Filipino film actress. Known by the screen name Fleur de Lis before and during World War II, she was one of the most renowned Filipina actresses of the late 1930s and 1940s.

== Career ==
Lisa was paired with Ely Ramos in LVN Pictures' Giliw Ko, along with LVN's first leading actress Mila del Sol and Fernando Poe. The film, directed by Carlos Vander Tolosa, is also remembered because Mona Lisa's appearance made history as she became the first actress to appear in a Filipino film wearing a bathing suit.

After WWII, she came back to the limelight as Mona Lisa, top billed with Teddy Benavidez in Kalbario ng Isang Ina (1946) and Siyudad sa Ilalim ng Lupa (1949) opposite Fernando Royo.

Mona Lisa paired with some of the Philippines' finest actors of the 1940s such as Ricardo Brillantes in Batang Lansangan, Pag-ibig at Patalim (1948) opposite Teddy Benavidez and Hanggang Langit (1947) with the Philippine actor known as "The Great Profile" Leopoldo Salcedo.

In the mid-40s, Mona Lisa paired several times with action/drama actor Fernando Poe in movies like Intramuros (1946), The 13th Sultan and Sagur, both in 1949.

Before the war struck Manila, Mona Lisa paired with famous debonair actor of the 40s Serafin Garcia in the movie Tinangay ng Apoy in 1940 and second lead only to the Philippines' newest screen siren of the early 1940s Paraluman opposite Fernando Poe.

Mona Lisa portrayed a war-shock civilian in 1952's Ulila ng Bataan opposite Sampaguita Pictures girl wonder Tessie Agana and Buhay Alamang (Paglukso'y Patay), along with Sampaguita actor Fred Montilla combined with premier actress Anita Linda also in 1952.

She resumed her film career in 1970 after an absence of nearly two decades, and remained active in the industry where she got a Best Supporting Actress Award for Insiang, and another Best Supporting Actress Award for the Metro Manila Film Festival in 1977 consecutively, where she portrayed a sex hungry mother of Insiang played by Hilda Koronel.

Some of her films from the mid to late 70s were as a supporting actress to lead actors such as Rio Locsin in Risa Jones: Showgirl! (1979), Atsay (1978) with Nora Aunor, Pagputi ng Uwak, Pag-itim ng Tagak (1978) with Vilma Santos and Bembol Roco, Mananayaw (1978) with Chanda Romero and Phillip Salvador, Hindi Kami Damong Ligaw (1976) with Charito Solis, and Itim (1976), in which she plays the mother of the character interpreted by a then promising talent and rising star, Charo Santos.

Her last movie, Mother Ignacia, in which she plays a nun in a Catholic church, was released in 1998.

A book on her life and career in show business written by her granddaughter, Mona Lisa: A Portrait (From the Memoirs of a Grandmother), was published in 2013 by ABS-CBN Publishing Inc.

== Death ==
Lisa died in her sleep on August 25, 2019, at her home in Manila, three years after she was diagnosed with Alzheimer's disease, at the age of 97.

== Filmography ==
=== Film ===
Year	Title	Role
1930	Bago Lumubog ang Araw	
1937	Ang Pagbabalik	
1938	Walang Pangalan	
1938	Mga Sugat ng Puso	
1938	Makiling	
1938	Dasalang Perlas	
1938	Bukang Liwayway	
1938	Bahay Kubo	
1938	Ang Magmamani	
1939	Giliw Ko	
1940	Dilim at Liwanag	
1940	Tinañgay Na Apoy	
1940	Datu-talim	
1941	Paraluman	
1941	Luksang Bituin	
1941	Puting Dambana	
1941	Palaris	
1941	Bayani ng Buhay	
1941	Ang Viuda Alegre	
1942	Princesa Urduja	
1946	Intramuros: The Rape of a City	
1946	Kalbario ng Isang Ina	
1946	Barong-barong	
1947	Bisig ng batas	
1947	Hanggang langit	
1947	Maria Kapra	
1948	Batang Lansangan	
1948	Matimtiman	
1948	Pag-ibig at Patalim	
1948	Sunset Over Corregidor	
1948	Outrages of the Orient	
1948	Krus ng Digma	
1948	Forbidden Women	Princess Apamena
1948	Beast of the East	
1949	Siyudad sa Ilalim ng Lupa	
1949	Sagur	
1949	The 13th Sultan	
1949	Naglahong Tala	
1950	Sundalong Talahib	
1951	Dugo ng Bataan	
1952	Buhay Alamang	
1952	Ulila ng Bataan	
1953	Blood of Bataan	Lolita Zalasar
1970	Romantika	
1970	Romantiko	
1974	La Paloma: Ang kalapating ligaw	Soledad
1974	Isang Gabi... Tatlong Babae!	
1975	Mga Uhaw na Bulaklak	
1975	Araw-araw, Gabi-gabi	
1976	Hindi Kami Damong Ligaw	
1976	Uhaw Na Bulaklak, Part II	
1976	Insiang	Tonya
1976	Itim	Aling Pining
1977	Electrika Kasi, Eh!	
1978	Mananayaw	
1978	Pagputi ng Uwak, Pag-itim ng Tagak	Diding
1978	Atsay	Lola
1979	Sino'ng Pipigil sa Pagpatak ng Ulan?	
1979	Risa Jones: Showgirl	
1980	Tanikala	
1981	Alfredo Sebastian	
1982	Oro, Plata, Mata	Lola Desta
1982	Cain and Abel	Senora Pina
1983	Hulihin ang... Mandurugas	
1983	Minsan Pa Nating Hagkan ang Nakaraan	Tia Salud
1984	Soltero	Old lady at the condominium
1984	This Is My Country	Turing's mother
1986	Napakasakit, Kuya Eddie	
1987	Paano Kung Wala Ka Na?	Mrs. Ledesma
1987	1 + 1 = 12 + 1 (Cheaper by the Dozen)	
1989	Barbi: Maid in the Philippines	
1989	Babangon Ako't Dudurugin Kita	Nanay Belen
1991	Umiyak Pati Langit	Doña Elena
1991	Huwag Mong Salingin ang Sugat Ko	Mrs.Regala
1994	The Elsa Santos Castillo Story: The Chop Chop Lady	Adelina Santos
1996	Pagsubok sa Hirap at Ginhawa	
1998	Mother Ignacia	Mother Ignacia (elder years)
2003	Kiskisan	Bining
2005	Camiling Story	Jenny

=== Television ===
Year	Title	Role	Remarks
1988	A Dangerous Life	Francisca Monzon	
1992	Maalaala Mo Kaya		Episode: "Dapithapon"
2000	Maalaala Mo Kaya		Episode: "Tirador"
2000	Kakabakaba		
2001	GMA Telesine: Pariwara		
2001	Maalaala Mo Kaya		Episode: "Gitara"

== Awards and nominations ==
Year	Award-giving body	Category	Work	Result
1976	Metro Manila Film Festival	Best Supporting Actress	Insiang	Won
1977	FAMAS Awards	Best Supporting Actress	Insiang	Won
1983	FAMAS Awards	Best Actress	Cain and Abel	Nominated
1986	Gawad Urian Awards	Best Supporting Actress	This Is My Country	Nominated
1999	Gawad Urian Awards	Lifetime Achievement Award	—N/a	Won
2005	Golden Screen Awards	Gawad Lino Brocka Lifetime Achievement Award	—N/a	Won
2005	National Commission for Culture and the Arts	Pama-As Gintong Bai Award	—N/a	Won
