= Lea Productions =

Philippine film production company

- Type: Private
- Industry: Film production
- Founded: 1960
- Defunct: 1994
- Headquarters: Malabon, Philippines
- Owner: Emilia Santos Blas; Teodorica Santos

Lea Productions was a Philippine film production company owned and run by sisters Emilia Santos Blas (after whom the company was named) and Teodorica Santos. It was among the major film companies of the Philippines in the 1960s and 1970s, along with Sampaguita Pictures, LVN Pictures and Premiere Productions.

== History ==
The film company was established in 1960 by the late sisters Emilia "Miling" Santos Blas and Teodorica "Toreng" Santos as a film distributor. They were first shown in the family-owned Ultravista Cinema in Malabon. A few years later, it began producing its own movies, notably Maruja in 1967.

Initially acclaimed for wholesome movies, by the end of the decade, Lea Productions started producing mostly romance, family drama and action. Among its homegrown talents were Dante Rivero, who was its signature actor, Boots Anson-Roa, Liza Lorena, Susan Roces, Amalia Fuentes, Pilar Pilapil, Hilda Koronel and Rosemarie Sonora. Among its notable directors were Lino Brocka, Dandy Nadres, Ishmael Bernal, Celso Ad Castillo, Armando de Guzman, and Romy Suzara.

In 1970, Lea Productions gave Lino Brocka his directorial break with Wanted: Perfect Mother, which gained several nominations at the Manila Film Festival. He has directed numerous films for Lea, like the controversial Tubog sa Ginto, which tackled homosexuality, Stardoom, which showed a young artist's ups and downs of stardom, and Ano Ang Kulay ng Mukha ng Diyos.

By 1984, Lea Productions started slowing production of movies. By this time, Miling's children took over the film company's operations. Having a lack of interest in the film industry, Lea Productions closed down in 1994 after the release of Doring Borobo. Years later, most of its films were destroyed when Ultravista Cinema was burned down.
