= Cholo Laurel =

Filipino filmmaker

Rafael "Cholo" Laurel
- Born: Rafael Hidalgo Laurel; July 26, 1961 (age 64); Philippines
- Other name: Cholo Laurel
- Occupation: Filmmaker

Rafael Hidalgo Laurel, better known as Cholo by his peers (born July 26, 1961) is a Filipino filmmaker best known for writing and directing the Star Cinema Classic Nasaan Ka Man.

Being the youngest son of Manuel Sosa Laurel (deceased) and Lilia Dayrit Hidalgo (deceased), he was born in the Laurel compound in San Juan on July 26, 1961. He has four siblings named Victor (deceased), Gina, Amy (deceased) and Rico.

He was educated at the University of the Philippines College of Broadcast Communications (1986), School of Continuing and Professional Studies - New York University (1995) and the London Academy for Film and TV ( 2007) and has been directing TV commercials and music videos since 1996.

His debut film, Nasaan Ka Man (Wherever you are), a love story/thriller produced by ABS-CBN films, swept most major awards in the FAMAS (Filipino Academy of Movie Arts and Sciences) Awards 2006 such as Best Director, Best Picture, Best Story and Best Screenplay. He is also a recipient of the Gawad Tanglaw Best Director Award given by Critics from the Academic Circle.

Cholo is based in the Philippines and continues to direct TV commercials around the Asian region.
