= Kung Aagawin Mo ang Lahat sa Akin (film) =

1987 melodrama film by Eddie Garcia

- Official movie poster
- Directed by: Eddie Garcia
- Screenplay by: Jose Javier Reyes; Gina Marissa Tagasa
- Story by: Helen Meriz
- Produced by: Ramon Salvador
- Starring: Sharon Cuneta; Jackie Lou Blanco
- Cinematography: Jose Batac Jr.
- Edited by: Ike Jarlego Jr.
- Music by: George Canseco
- Production company: Viva Films
- Distributed by: Viva Films
- Release date: February 19, 1987
- Running time: 110 minutes
- Country: Philippines
- Language: Filipino

Kung Aagawin Mo ang Lahat sa Akin (English: If You Take Everything from Me) is a 1987 Philippine drama film directed by Eddie Garcia and written by Jose Javier Reyes and Gina Marissa Tagasa from a comics serial of the same name created by Helen Meriz. Starring Sharon Cuneta and Jackie Lou Blanco, the film centers around an intense sibling rivalry between a younger daughter named Gladys and an older sibling named Maureen, who was adopted before the former was born.

== Plot ==
The story revolves around Gladys and her adopted older sister, Maureen. Their father, Gilbert, treats both daughters with love and treats them fairly, while their mother, Clara, favors Gladys. Because of this, Gladys grew up into a selfish brat who wants everything that her sister owns, including the man that she loves.

== Cast ==
- Sharon Cuneta as Maureen Andrada: The adopted older daughter of Gilbert and Clara Andrada, who has grown to be a decent woman.
  - Mary Grace Ortaleza as Baby Maureen
  - Vina Morales as Young Maureen
- Jackie Lou Blanco as Gladys Andrada: The biological younger daughter of Gilbert and Clara Andrada, who has grown to be a spoiled brat.
  - Karen Ann Gil as Young Gladys
- Tonton Gutierrez as Troy: Arvin's cousin and Victor and Romina's nephew
- Ricky Davao as Arvin: Victor and Romina's son and Troy's cousin
- Laurice Guillen as Clara Andrada: The family matriarch who, along with her daughter Gladys, despises Maureen
- Dante Rivero as Gilbert Andrada: The family patriarch who treats his daughters equally
- Luis Gonzales as Don Victor Samaniego: Arvin's father and Troy's uncle
- Rosemarie Gil as Donya Romina Samaniego: Arvin's mother and Troy's aunt
- Alicia Alonzo as Yaya Rosita: The Andrada family's kindhearted housekeeper
- Francis Magalona as Dino: Gladys's ex-boyfriend
- Ali Sotto as Joyce: Maureen's best friend
- Aurora Salve as Vicky
- Martin Santos as Mikey
- Rose Rosado as Marivic
- Ester Chavez as Dra. Corpuz
- Ernie Zarate as Dr. Fernando

== Adaptations ==
In 2009, the film was adapted by GMA Network into a series as part of the Sine Novela installment. Maxene Magalona played the role of Maureen, while Glaiza de Castro played Gladys, followed by Jackie Rice as Mercedita in the version of the series (not included in the movie). Jackie Lou Blanco played the role of Doña Clara this time.
