= Insiang =

- Theatrical release poster
- Directed by: Lino Brocka
- Screenplay by: Mario O'Hara; Lamberto E. Antonio
- Story by: Mario O'Hara
- Starring: Hilda Koronel; Mona Lisa; Ruel Vernal; Rez Cortez; Marlon Ramirez
- Cinematography: Conrado Baltazar
- Edited by: Augusto Salvador
- Music by: Minda D. Azarcon
- Production company: CineManila Corporation
- Release date: December 25, 1976
- Running time: 94 minutes
- Country: Philippines
- Language: Filipino

Insiang (Tagalog pronunciation: [inˈʃaŋ]) is a 1976 Philippine drama film directed by Lino Brocka. Its screenplay, written by Mario O'Hara and Lamberto E. Antonio, is based on O'Hara's teleplay of the same name. Set in the slums of Tondo, Manila, the film stars Hilda Koronel as the eponymous character: the young daughter of a resentful mother (Mona Lisa), whose much-younger lover (Ruel Vernal) rapes her. After her assault and the betrayal of her own lover (Rez Cortez), Insiang seeks revenge. A representation of urban poverty, the film explores themes of betrayal, revenge and despair.

It is the first Philippine film to be shown at the Cannes Film Festival, and to use Tondo as a shooting location. A box-office failure, Insiang received good reviews from critics (some of whom regarded it as one of Brocka's best). The film's rights were transferred to the Film Development Council of the Philippines in 2015 by producer Ruby Tiong Tan for the council's discussion with Martin Scorsese's The Film Foundation, a nonprofit organization dedicated to film preservation, about its restoration. The restored version was selected for screening in the Cannes Classics section of the 2015 Cannes Film Festival, and played at a number of other film festivals.

== Plot ==
In the shanty town of Tondo, Insiang works as a laundrywoman. Her mother Tonya, whose husband left her and her daughter for another woman, sells fish at a palengke. Unable to get over this rejection, Tonya takes it out on Insiang, treating her miserably and preventing her from pursuing relationships with men. Tonya is romantically involved with Dado, a butcher several years her junior. Tonya evicts her sister-in-law and her family from their home, saying that they are a burden, and Dado moves in the following day.

Insiang's car-mechanic boyfriend Bebot sneaks into her house one night and asks her to have sex to make up for missing their date. She spurns his advances, telling him to leave before Dado (who sneaks out of his bedroom) awakens. Tonya learns about the affair and slaps Insiang repeatedly. Dado meets with Bebot and warns him not to go near Insiang again, explaining that he has a hold over the girl and her mother. After learning from Bebot about Dado's threat, Insiang confronts Dado for meddling in her relationship. When he claims that Bebot is cavorting with other women and his threat was intended for her security, Insiang disagrees. He chokes her into unconsciousness later that night and carries her away.

Tonya finds her crying in pain the next morning and learns that she has been raped by Dado. When he returns home, Tonya throws objects at him and tells him to leave. He admits to having sex with Insiang, but convinces Tonya that her daughter tried to seduce him by bathing (and lying nude) in his presence. Tonya then blames Insiang for the assault, comparing her daughter to the girl's womanizing father. Bebot agrees to elope with Insiang to prove his love for her. They check into a cheap hotel in Binondo, where they consummate their relationship. Insiang wakes up alone the next morning, with no idea where Bebot is.

She returns home, and she is forgiven by Tonya on the condition that she works with her at the market to keep her from seducing Dado again. Dado sneaks into Insiang's bedroom that night and apologizes for raping her, claiming that he was unable to control his love for her, explaining that he had only seduced Tonya to get closer to Insiang, and telling her that he had given up all his other girlfriends since he fell in love with Insiang. She invites him to have sex the following night. She finds Bebot acting cold and distant the following day; that night, Insiang asks Dado to avenge her. Dado and his gang beat up Bebot at the dump the next day. Tonya notices Insiang and Dado becoming closer to each other and suspiciously confronts her daughter, who repeats Dado's words to her, telling her that Dado only seduced her to get to Insiang, and that the two of them were planning to marry. Furious, she stabs Dado to death as Insiang watches without apparent shock or pity.

Sometime later, Insiang visits Tonya in prison. Uninterested in seeing her at first, Tonya tells her daughter that she has no qualms about murdering Dado; she did it so that he and Insiang could not be together. Insiang replies that she was disgusted with him for raping her and that she wanted Tonya to kill Dado in anger and jealousy. Tonya says that Insiang must be overjoyed now that she has her revenge. Insiang tearfully hugs Tonya, craving her affection. When Tonya responds coldly, Insiang leaves her. Consumed with guilt, Tonya tearfully watches her daughter walk away from behind the prison bars.

== Cast ==
- Hilda Koronel as Insiang
- Mona Lisa as Tonya
- Ruel Vernal as Dado
- Rez Cortez as Bebot
- Nina Lorenzo as Ludy Karyas
- Marlon Ramirez as Nanding Karyas
- Mely Mallari as Tonya's sister-in-law
- Carpi Asturias as Mr. Karyas
- Eddie Pagayon as Bebot's friend
- Joe Jardi as Bebot's friend
- Danny Posadas as Dado's friend
- Tommy Yap as Hotel manager
- Members of the PETA Kalinangan Ensemble

== Themes ==
Insiang explores themes of betrayal, revenge, and despair. Lino Brocka said "The film is basically a character study of a young girl growing up in the slums. I wanted to show the violence of the overcrowded neighborhoods; the loss of human dignity caused by the social environment and the ensuing need for change." It has been associated with the rape and revenge subgenre. Don Jaucian of CNN Philippines said that the film's opening scene, depicting pigs being butchered, was "a thinly veiled depiction of the plight of the Filipinos under the Martial Law regime". Some critics have associated the slaughterhouse scene with the country's poverty.

== Production ==
The film was originally an episode of the Philippine television dramatic series Hilda, which aired in 1974 with 17-year-old Hilda Koronel in the lead role. The screenplay, by Mario O'Hara, was inspired by a family he once knew.

According to journalist Jo-Ann Maglipon, Brocka briefly considered casting Imee Marcos, his friend and daughter of Philippine President Ferdinand Marcos, for the title role of Insiang, but Koronel was chosen for the role instead.

Producer Ruby Tiong Tan (a stockbroker at the time) was approached by Brocka to pitch the film with O'Hara's script: "That was the first time I met him. I found him to be sincere, professional, convincing; he had a fire in his eyes as he spoke. That impressed me. I couldn't turn him down. At the end of that meeting, I told him 'yes, let's do the film'". Two days later, filming began for 21 days, on location in Tondo. Policemen were on duty during the shoot to prevent the crew from being bothered by gangsters, since the slums of Tondo had an organized-crime presence. The filmmakers had to work quickly, wrapping production in time for the first Metro Manila Film Festival.

== Release ==
=== Initial release ===
Insiang's initial release in the Philippines was halted under the regime of President Ferdinand Marcos in 1976. Marcos's wife Imelda was critical of the film, saying that it barely depicted a "beautiful view" of the Philippines, and it was a target of censorship by governing bodies for the same reason. Imee Marcos, however, was a principal sponsor to the film's fundraising premiere, with proceeds going to the squatter outreach program of Assumption College San Lorenzo and the burn unit of the Philippine General Hospital.

Religious officials and the public protested, which obliged the censors to lift the ban and allow the film to be released. It was unsuccessful at the Philippine box office, forcing Brocka's production company (CineManila Corporation) into bankruptcy. The film was entered in the 1976 Metro Manila Film Festival, and won its four categories: Best Actress (Koronel), Best Supporting Actor (Vernal), Best Supporting Actress (Lisa), and Best Cinematography (Conrado Baltazar).

Producer Ruby Tiong Tan was contacted that year by Cannes Film Festival artistic adviser Pierre Rissient, who told her that Insiang had been selected as a Best Foreign Film entry. Tiong Tan, Koronel and Brocka traveled to France for the festival, the producer reportedly smuggling the film rolls in her luggage to prevent customs officers from confiscating them; she had added English subtitles. At the 1978 Cannes festival, the film premiered during the festival's Directors' Fortnight section to critical acclaim; it was the first Philippine film shown at Cannes. Koronel's performance led to her front-page appearance in the French daily Le Monde. In the United States, however, the film was less well-received at its premiere.

=== Later release and home media ===
Cannes Classics poster for Insiang

In 2015, Insiang was digitally restored in a joint effort by the World Cinema Project (owned by director Martin Scorsese), L'Immagine Ritrovata and the Film Development Council of the Philippines (FDCP). For its preservation, the film's rights were transferred by Ruby Tiong Tan to the FDCP. The three organizations were also involved in the 2013 restoration of Manila in the Claws of Light (Maynila, sa mga Kuko ng Liwanag), a film directed by Brocka in 1974. Insiang was shown as part of the Cannes Classics section at the 2015 Cannes Film Festival on May 16. It was also screened at the New York Film Festival (hosted by the Film Society of Lincoln Center) on September 28, and at the Museum of Modern Art (MoMA) from October 28 to November 3 of that year. The restored version was screened at the 2016 Toronto International Film Festival (TIFF) on April 9 with other preserved films, including The Manchurian Candidate (1962) and Bunny Lake Is Missing (1965).

The British Film Institute released the restored version in the United Kingdom as Two Films by Lino Brocka, a 2017 box set, which includes two DVDs and two Blu-ray discs (one for each film) of Manila in the Claws of Light and Insiang. Both transfers of the Insiang disc include Signed: Lino Brocka, a 1987 documentary directed by Christian Blackwood with an in-depth look at Brocka's life and career. Insiang joined the Criterion Collection as part of Scorsese's World Cinema Project No. 2.

== Reception and legacy ==
Insiang received good reviews from foreign and domestic critics, some of whom called it Lino Brocka's masterpiece. Richard Brody of The New Yorker called it an "intense, furious melodrama" which "fuses its narrative energy with documentary veracity". Manohla Dargis of The New York Times wrote "Throughout, Mr. Brocka, working with his excellent director of photography, Conrado Baltazar, creates images of startling power, like that of bloody hands clutching in the void." Nick Schager of Slant Magazine gave the film a score of 3.5 out of 4: "Brocka's portrait of familial treachery and societal abandonment channels its melodrama through the filter of neorealism, its story's heightened emotions kept at a simmer by an aesthetic at once verité-blunt and yet shrewdly, meticulously composed."

José B. Capino of Film Comment wrote "Brocka's handling of melodrama is nothing short of virtuoso." Michael Joshua Rowin of Reverse Shot (a Museum of the Moving Image publication) was, however, critical of its status as a masterpiece: "Insiang is all skeleton and little flesh: the actors trudge in front of the camera, woodenly recite the purely functional lines from Lamberto E. Antonio and Maria O'Hara's screenplay, and wait for Brocka to provide some sort of commentary. None arrives."

Rotten Tomatoes gives the film a score of 100 percent, based on six critics, and a weighted average of 7.4 out of 10. O'Hara adapted the script into a play for the Tanghalang Pilipino (Philippine Theater) in 2004. The Philippine Star listed Insiang seventh on its 25 Most Memorable Films list in 2011.

== Accolades ==
Award	Year	Category	Work	Result	Ref(s)
Metro Manila Film Festival	1976	Best Actress	Hilda Koronel	Won	
Metro Manila Film Festival	1976	Best Supporting Actor	Ruel Vernal	Won	
Metro Manila Film Festival	1976	Best Supporting Actress	Mona Lisa	Won	
Metro Manila Film Festival	1976	Best Cinematography	Conrado Baltazar	Won	
Gawad Urian Awards	1977	Best Film	Insiang	Nominated	
Gawad Urian Awards	1977	Best Director	Lino Brocka	Nominated	
Gawad Urian Awards	1977	Best Screenplay	Mario O'Hara and Lamberto E. Antonio	Nominated	
Gawad Urian Awards	1977	Best Actress	Hilda Koronel	Nominated	
Gawad Urian Awards	1977	Best Supporting Actor	Ruel Vernal	Won	
Gawad Urian Awards	1977	Best Production Design	Fiel Zabat	Nominated	
Gawad Urian Awards	1977	Best Cinematography	Conrado Baltazar	Nominated	
Gawad Urian Awards	1977	Best Editing	Augusto Salvador	Nominated	
FAMAS Award	1977	Best Supporting Actress	Mona Lisa	Won	

== See also ==
- Cinema of the Philippines
- List of films with a 100% rating on Rotten Tomatoes
