= Hilda Koronel =

Filipino actress

- Born: Susan Reid; January 17, 1957 (age 69); Angeles, Pampanga, Philippines
- Education: Miriam College (MA)
- Years active: 1970–present
- Spouses: Jay Ilagan (m. 1973; died 1992) Ralph Moore Jr. (m. 2000)
- Children: 6

Hilda Koronel (born Susan Reid; January 17, 1957) is a MMFF, FAMAS, Luna and Urian award-winning Filipino actress and former singer. Born to a Filipino mother and an American father who was a serviceman in Clark Air Base, she has starred in around 45 films, many of which are critically acclaimed, since 1970.

She started her showbiz career in the early 1970s as a Lea Productions' contract star and was paired with Ed Finlan, Walter Navarro, Tirso Cruz, III and Jay Ilagan. Ilagan eventually became her husband. Because of her natural gift of acting, Lino Brocka took notice of her and directed her in a weekly drama show, entitled, Hilda. Her career got off to an unprecedented start becoming the youngest winner of the FAMAS Best Supporting Actress award in 1970 right at the beginning of her career which she won at the age of just 13 for her role in the 1970 film Santiago!.

In 1975 and 1976, she starred in the Lino Brocka classics Manila in the Claws of Light, which won six FAMAS awards in 1976, and Insiang, which won both a FAMAS Award and a Gawad Urian Award in 1977. To date she has won three awards and received 11 nominations.

In 2013, she received a Luna Award for best supporting actress for her role in The Mistress.

In 2002–2003, she starred in the hit ensemble political critically acclaimed primetime drama Kung Mawawala Ka on GMA-7 as a series regular. In 2005, her last primetime drama series was Ikaw ang Lahat sa Akin on ABS-CBN with another ensemble cast.

== Personal life ==
She attended Manuel L. Quezon University in Quiapo for her secondary education and finished International Studies at Maryknoll College, now Miriam College. In May 2000, Koronel married Filipino-American businessman Ralph Moore, Jr. in Laughlin, Nevada. Koronel has six children: Leona, Ixara, and Patricia (with actor Jay Ilagan); Isabel (with Bambi del Castillo); Gabrielle (with Spanky Monserrat); and Diego (with Dr. Victor Lopez).

== Filmography ==
=== Film ===
| Year | Title | Role | Note(s) | Ref(s). |
|---|---|---|---|---|
| 1970 | Haydee | Haydee | | |
| 1970 | Santiago! | Cristina | | |
| 1972 | Till Death Do Us Part | | | |
| 1974 | Tinimbang Ka Ngunit Kulang | Evangeline Ortega | | |
| 1974 | Hellow, Soldier | Gina | | |
| 1975 | Manila in the Claws of Light | Ligaya Paraiso | | |
| 1976 | Insiang | Insiang | | |
| 1977 | Kung Mangarap Ka't Magising | Anna | | |
| 1978 | Hayop sa Hayop | Alice | | |
| 1979 | Evening Class | | | |
| 1980 | Kasal | Grace | | |
| 1980 | Nakaw na Pag-ibig | Cynthia Ocampo | | |
| 1982 | PX | Lydia | | |
| 1982 | Gaano Kadalas ang Minsan? | Elsa | | |
| 1983 | Sana Bukas Pa ang Kahapon | Ana | | |
| 1983 | Palabra de Honor | Christy | | |
| 1984 | Kung Mahawi man ang Ulap | Catherine Clemente | | |
| 1984 | Working Girls | Carla Asuncion | | |
| 1985 | Beloved | Renee | | |
| 1986 | Nasaan Ka Nang Kailangan Kita | Jenny | | |
| 1989 | Babangon Ako't Dudurugin Kita | Via | | |
| 1990 | Nagsimula sa Puso | Celine | | |
| 2000 | Tanging Yaman | Celine | | |
| 2003 | Crying Ladies | Aling Doray / Rhoda Rivera | | |
| 2004 | Santa Santita | Chayong | | |
| 2005 | Nasaan Ka Man | Trining | | |
| 2006 | Don't Give Up on Us | Pilar | | |
| 2006 | Eternity | Chayong | | |
| 2011 | Way Back Home | Jomar Carey | | |
| 2012 | The Mistress | Regina Torres | | |
| 2025 | Sisa | Sisa | Main role, Official for the 29th Tallinn Black Nights Film Festival Entry | |

=== Television ===
| Year | Title | Role | Note(s) | Ref(s). |
|---|---|---|---|---|
| 1979 | Hilda | Herself | | |
| 1997–1998 | Esperanza | Stella Guevarra | | |
| 1997 | Mula sa Puso | Jerry | | |
| 1998 | Sa Sandaling Kailangan Mo Ako | Dolor Morales | | |
| 1999 | Ang Munting Paraiso | Cindy | | |
| 1999–2001 | Marinella | Adela Rodriguez | | |
| 2001–2002 | Sa Dulo ng Walang Hanggan | Dolores | | |
| 2002–2003 | Kung Mawawala Ka | Alicia | | |
| 2005 | Ikaw ang Lahat sa Akin | Susanna Ynares | | |
| 2005 | Hokus Pokus | Matilda | | |
| 2026 | Fast Talk with Boy Abunda | Herself (guest) | | |

== Awards ==
=== FAMAS (Filipino Academy of Movie Arts and Sciences Awards) ===
| Year | Nominated work | Category | Result |
|---|---|---|---|
| 2013 | The Mistress | Best Supporting Actress | Nominated |
| 2006 | Nasaan Ka Man | Best Supporting Actress | Nominated |
| 2004 | Crying Ladies | Best Supporting Actress | Nominated |
| 1990 | Babangon Ako't Dudurugin Kita | Best Supporting Actress | Nominated |
| 1983 | PX | Best Actress | Nominated |
| 1977 | Insiang | Best Actress | Nominated |
| 1976 | Maynila sa Kuko ng Liwanag | Best Actress | Nominated |
| 1971 | Santiago | Best Supporting Actress | Won |

=== Film Academy of the Philippines (Luna Awards) ===
| Year | Nominated work | Category | Result |
|---|---|---|---|
| 2013 | The Mistress | Best Supporting Actress | Won |
| 2006 | Nasaan Ka Man | Best Supporting Actress | Won |
| 2005 | Santa Santita | Best Supporting Actress | Nominated |

=== Gawad Urian (Manunuri ng Pelikulang Pilipino) ===
| Year | Nominated work | Category | Result |
|---|---|---|---|
| 2024 | Herself | Lifetime Achievement Award | Won |
| 2006 | Nasaan Ka Man | Best Supporting Actress | Won |
| 2004 | Crying Ladies | Best Supporting Actress | Nominated |
| 2001 | Tanging Yaman | Best Supporting Actress | Nominated |
| 1978 | Kung Mangrap Ka't Magising | Best Actress | Nominated |
| 1977 | Insiang | Best Actress | Nominated |

=== Maria Clara Awards ===
| Year | Nominated work | Category | Result |
|---|---|---|---|
| 2006 | Nasaan Ka Man | Best Supporting Actress | Won |

=== Awards from the press ===
Star Awards for Movies (Philippine Movie Press Club)
| Year | Nominated work | Category | Result |
|---|---|---|---|
| 2013 | The Mistress | Best Supporting Actress | Nominated |
| 2006 | Nasaan Ka Man | Best Supporting Actress | Nominated |
| 2004 | Crying Ladies | Best Supporting Actress | Won |

Golden Screen Awards (ENPRESS)
| Year | Nominated work | Category | Result |
|---|---|---|---|
| 2013 | The Mistress | Best Performance by an Actress in a Supporting Role-Drama, Musical Comedy | Nominated |
| 2006 | Nasaan Ka Man | Best Performance by an Actress in a Supporting Role-Drama, Musical Comedy | Nominated |
| 2005 | Santa Santita | Best Performance by an Actress in a Supporting Role-Drama, Musical Comedy | Nominated |

=== Film festivals ===
Metro Manila Film Festival
| Year | Nominated work | Category | Result |
|---|---|---|---|
| 1976 | Insiang | Best Actress | Won |
| 2003 | Crying Ladies | Best Supporting Actress | Won |

=== Critics award ===
Young Critics Circle
| Year | Nominated work | Category | Result |
|---|---|---|---|
| 2006 | Nasaan Ka Man | Best Performance by Male or Female, Adult or Child, Individual or Ensemble in Leading or Supporting Role | Nominated^{I} |
| 2001 | Tanging Yaman | Best Performance by Male or Female, Adult or Child, Individual or Ensemble in Leading or Supporting Role | Won^{II} |

== Notes ==
^I ensemble nomination (Nasaan Ka Man).
^II Shared with the cast of Tanging Yaman.
