= Jay Ilagan =

Filipino actor (1955-1992)

- Ilagan in the 1976 film, Minsa'y Isang Gamu-gamo
- Born: Julius Angel Abad Ilagan; January 20, 1955; Manila, Philippines
- Died: February 4, 1992 (aged 37); Quezon City, Philippines
- Resting place: Loyola Memorial Park, Marikina, Metro Manila
- Occupation: Actor
- Years active: 1964–1992
- Spouse: Hilda Koronel (m. 1973; separated)
- Partner: Amy Austria (1983–1992)

Julius Angel Abad Ilagan (January 20, 1955 – February 4, 1992) was a Filipino actor. He hosted Stop, Look and Listen and starred in My Son, My Son and Goin' Bananas, and starred and participated in a number of movies.

Born Julius Abad Ilagan on January 20, 1955, he starred in the films Maruja (1967), Tubog Sa Ginto (1970), Pinoy Crazy Boys (1974), and Hinog Sa Pilit. Jay won a Gawad Urian Best Supporting Actor trophy in 1982 for the movie, Kisapmata, another Gawad Urian Best Actor in 1985 for his role in Sister Stella L., and 1988 FAMAS and Film Academy of the Philippines Best Actor for his acting in Maging Akin Ka Lamang.

He also appeared in a number of comedy movies and TV shows alongside dramatic films.

== Personal life ==
The son of Sampaguita Pictures star Corazon Noble and director Angel Esmeralda started out as a child actor, originally using "Angel" as his screen name.

At the age of 18, he married actress Hilda Koronel, a protégé of director Lino Brocka. The couple initially kept their marriage private, but it later became public knowledge after their separation. During their relationship, they adopted children and had one biological daughter together.

In 1983, Ilagan began a relationship with actress Amy Austria. The two lived together from that year until Ilagan’s death on February 4, 1992.

== Filmography ==
=== Film ===
Year	Title	Role	Notes
1961	Walang Duwag na Lalaki		
1963	Callejon 11		
1964	Moro Witch Doctor	Mahmud	
1970	Santiago!	Danilo	
1971	Tubog sa Ginto	Santi	
1973	Carmela		
1973	Ato ti Bondying	Bondying	his 1st comedy movie
1975	Tatlo, Dalawa, Isa	Noni	
1975	Kaming Matatapang Ang Apog		
1975	Fe, Esperanza, Caridad	Husband of Esperanza - 2nd Episode ("Esperanza")	
1976	Ligaw Tingin, Halik Hangin		
1976	Daigdig ng Lagim		
1976	Minsa'y Isang Gamu-gamo	Bonifacio Santos	
1977	Tisoy!	Boy	
1979	Sino'ng Pipigil sa Pagpatak ng Ulan		
1979	Salawahan		
1979	Coed		
1980	Aguila	Osman Águila	
1980	Kasal?		
1980	Kakabakaba Ka Ba?		First collaboration with Mike de Leon.
1980	Brutal	Tato	
1981	Pabling		
1981	Kisapmata	Noel Manalansan	Second collaboration with Mike de Leon.
1982	Mga Hiwaga ng Pag-asa		
1983	M.I.B.: Men In Brief	Anthony Phillips	
1983	Bad Bananas sa Puting Tabing		
1983	Sana Bukas ang Kahapon	Ramon	
1984	Soltero	Crispin Rodriguez	
1984	Sister Stella L.	Nick Fajardo	Third collaboration with Mike de Leon.
1984	Mga Batang Yagit		
1985	Bituing Walang Ningning	Zosimo Blanco	
1985	Sa Totoo Lang	Ipe	His last comedy movie
1986	Sana'y Wala Nang Wakas		
1987	Operation: Get Victor Corpuz, the Rebel Soldier		
1987	Maging Akin Ka Lamang	Ernie Balboa	
1988	Paano Tatakasan ang Bukas		
1990	Nagsimula sa Puso	Jim	
1992	Alyas Pogi 2	Jimboy	Final film role

=== Television ===
Title	Year	Role	Network
1977–1980	Prinsipe Abante		GMA Network
1986–1991	Goin' Bananas	Host	IBC; ABS-CBN

== Death ==
On February 4, 1992, in Quezon City, Jay's motorcycle was hit from behind by a drunk driver who was arguing with his girlfriend which resulted in him being thrown off and falling head first. He died due to the severity of his injuries. He was not wearing a protective helmet. He was 37 years old.

Ilagan is buried at Loyola Memorial Park beside mother Corazon Noble, Leslie Angel A. Ilagan and Lourdes S. de Asis.

== Gallery ==
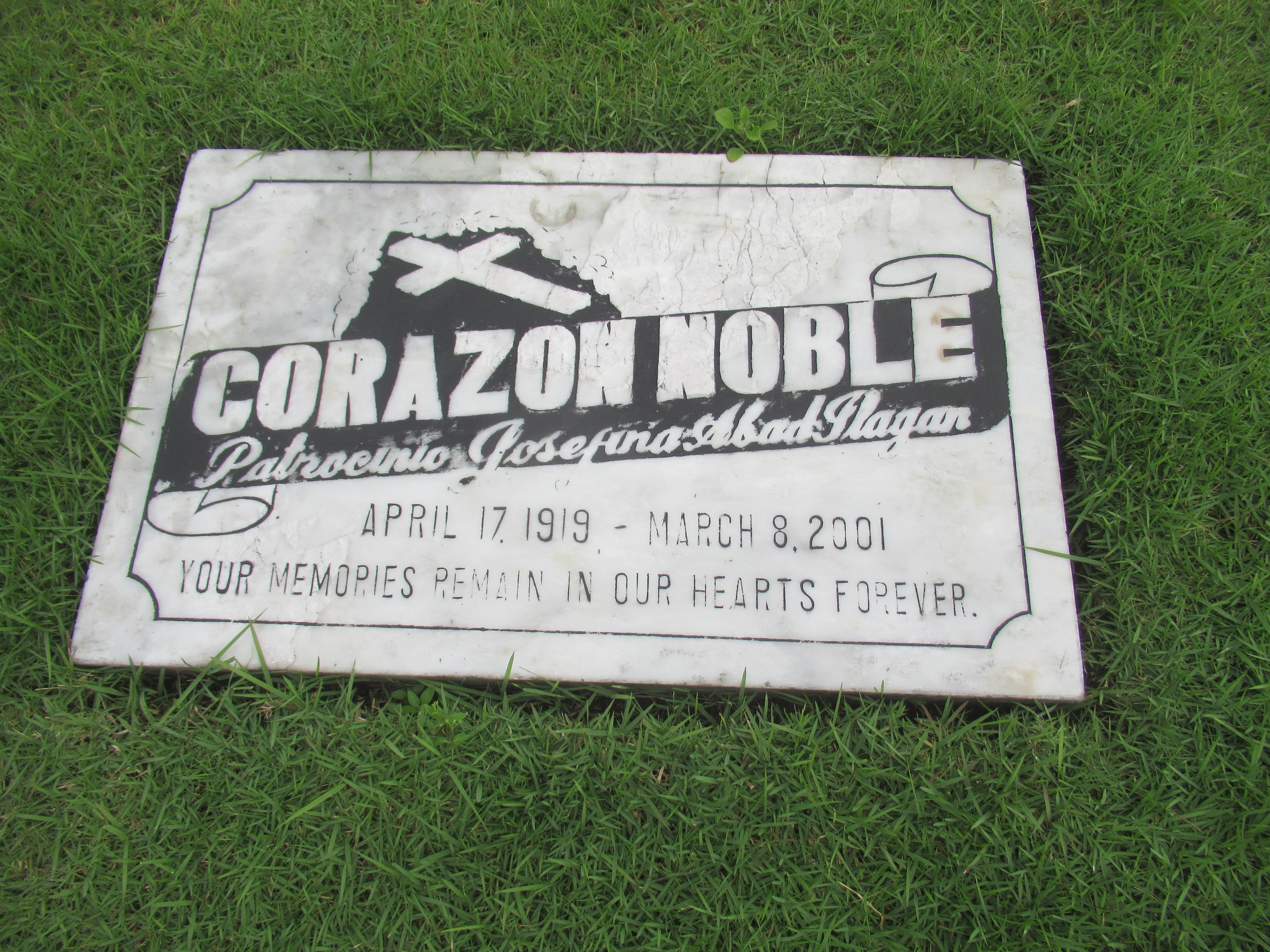
Corazon Noble

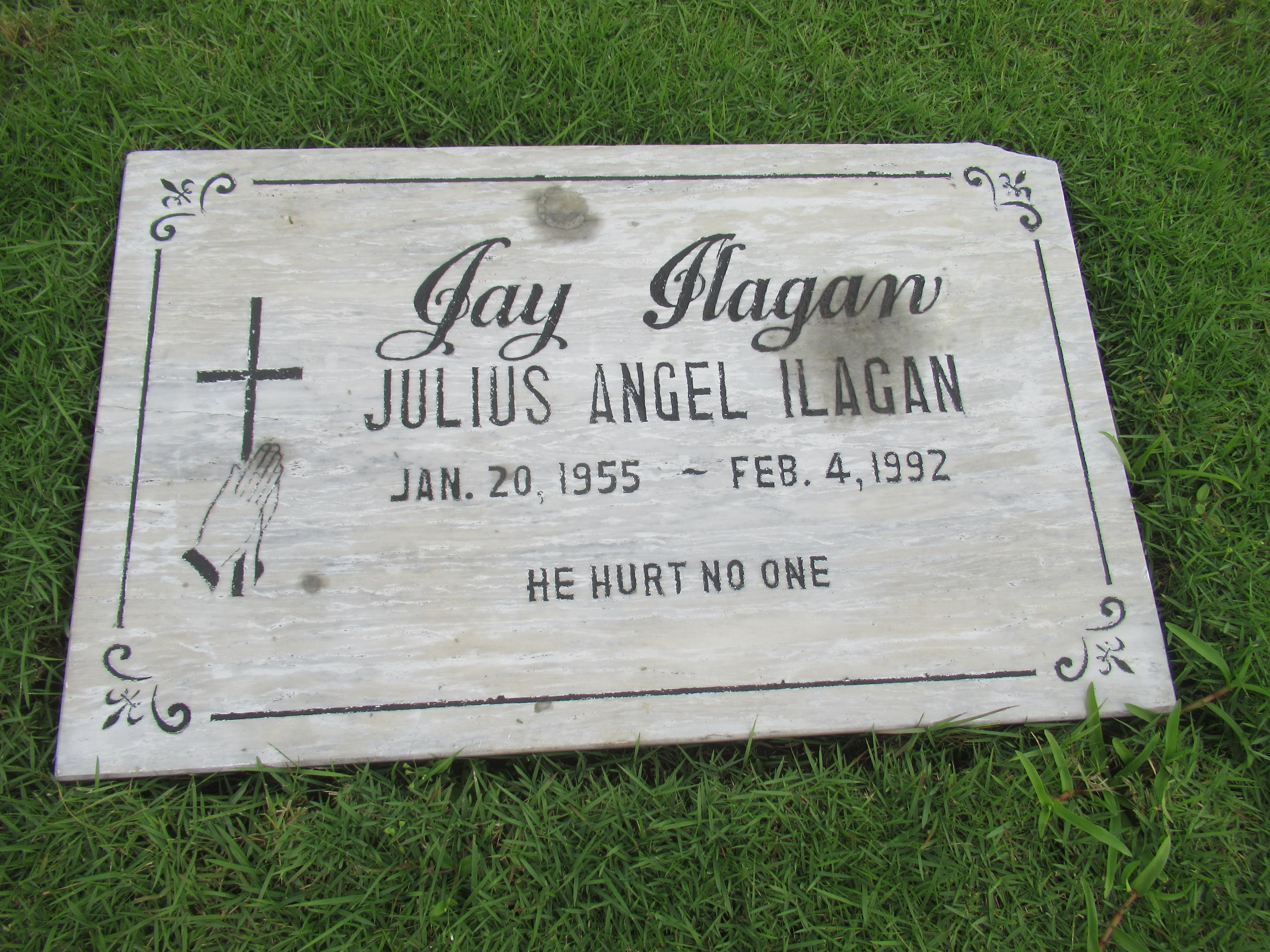
Julius Angel Ilagan

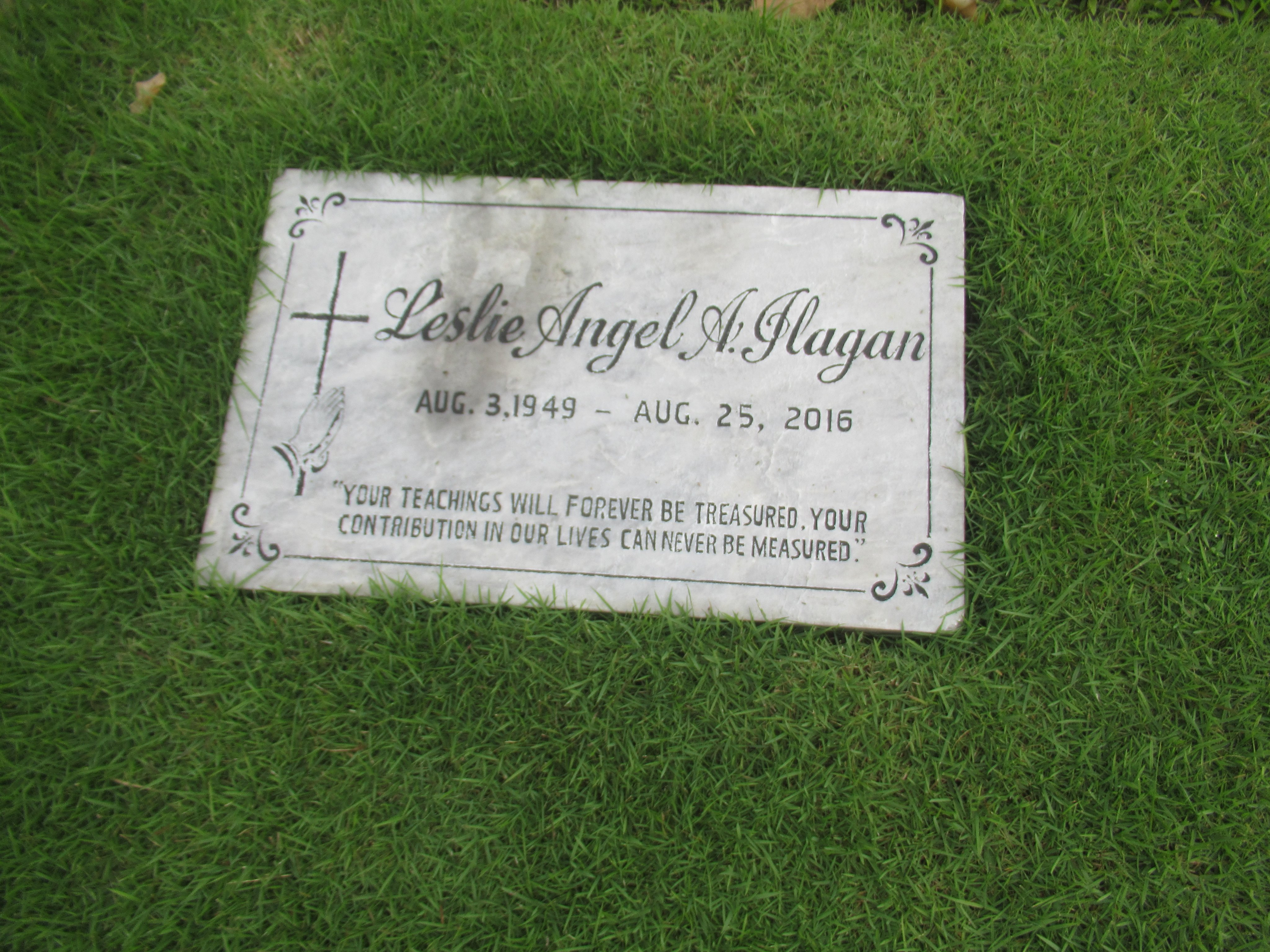
Leslie Angel A. Ilagan

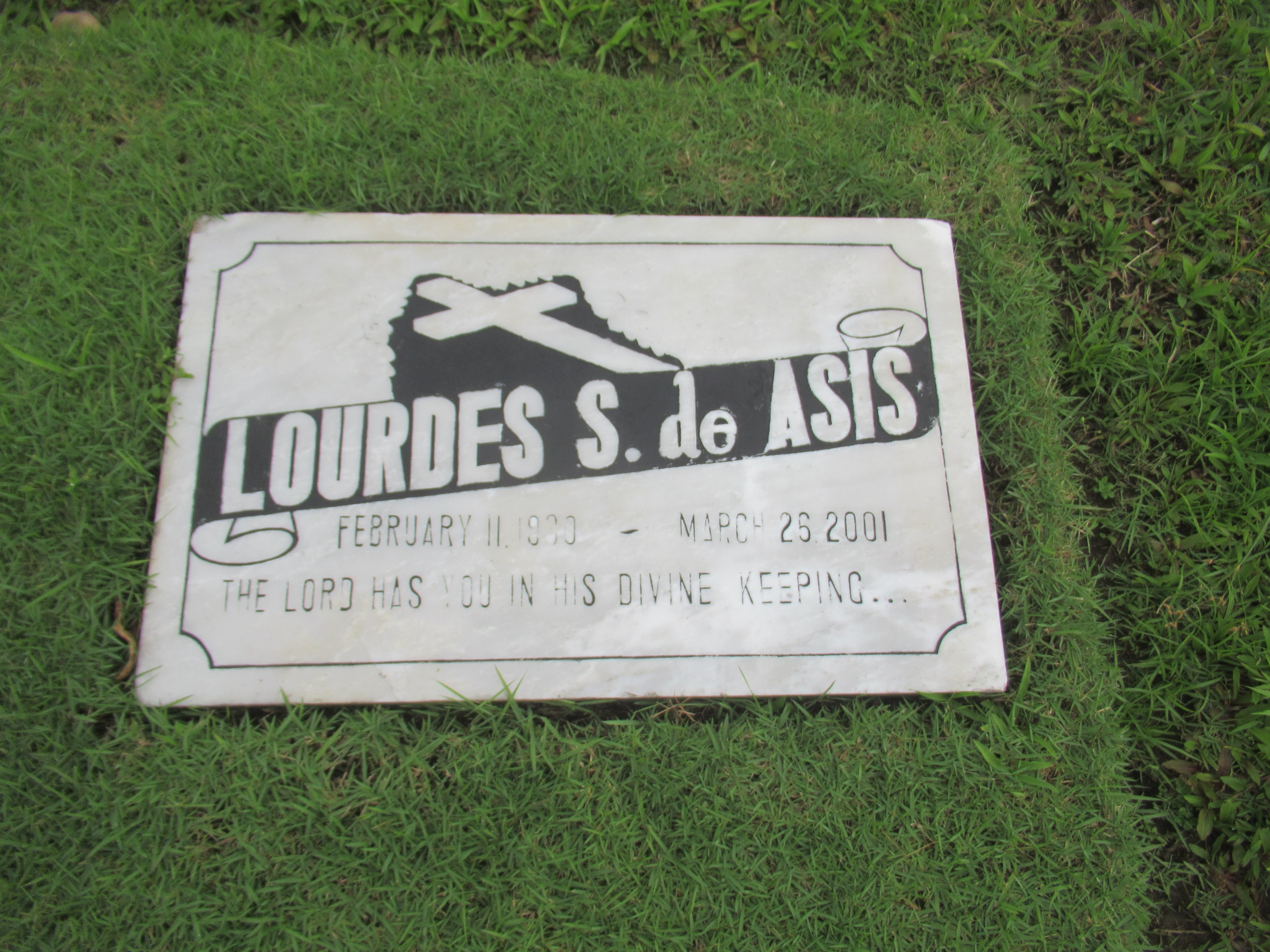
Lourdes S. de Asis

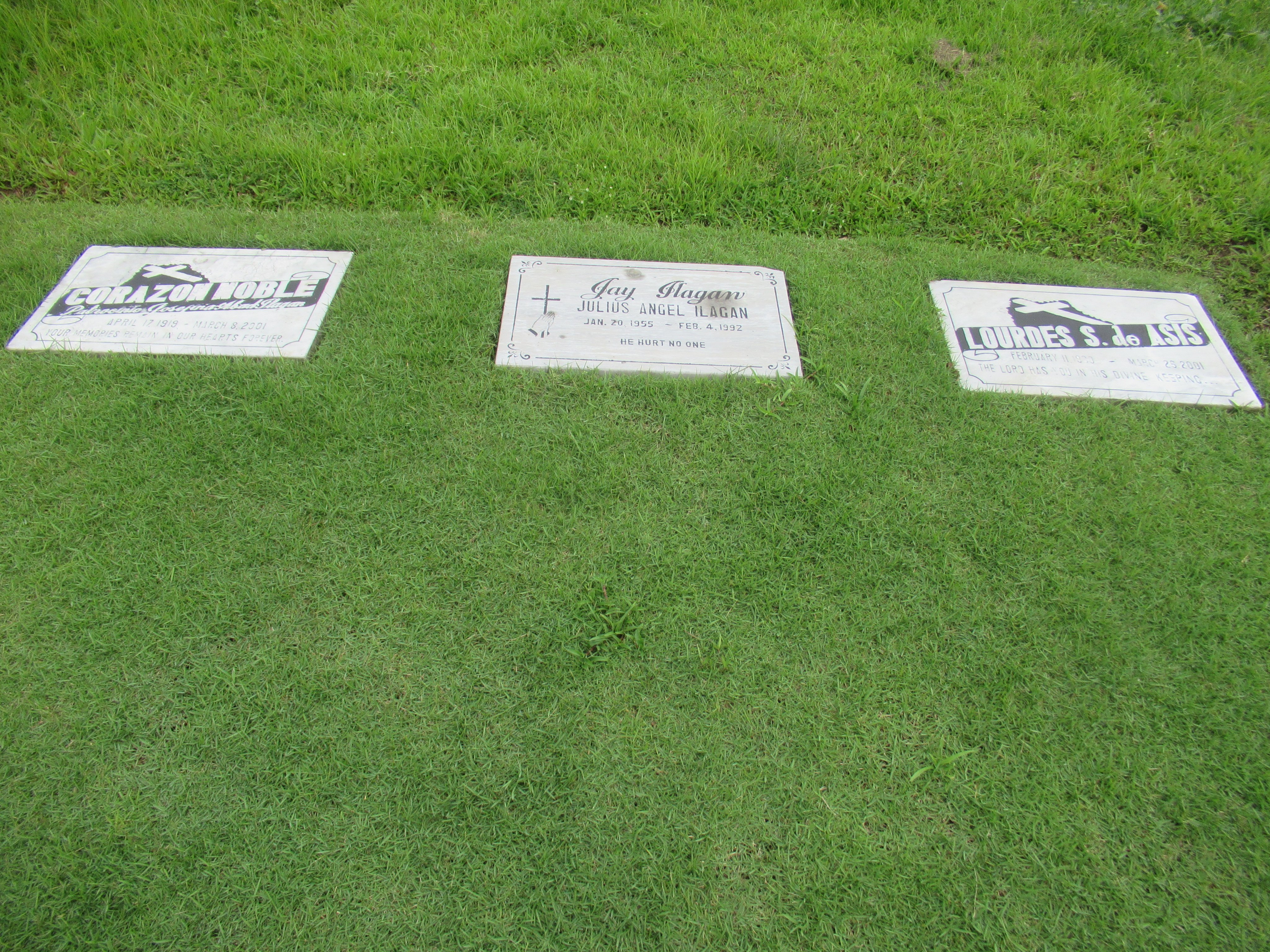
Ilagan family grave Loyola Memorial Park
