= Dante Rivero =

Filipino film & television actor (born 1946)

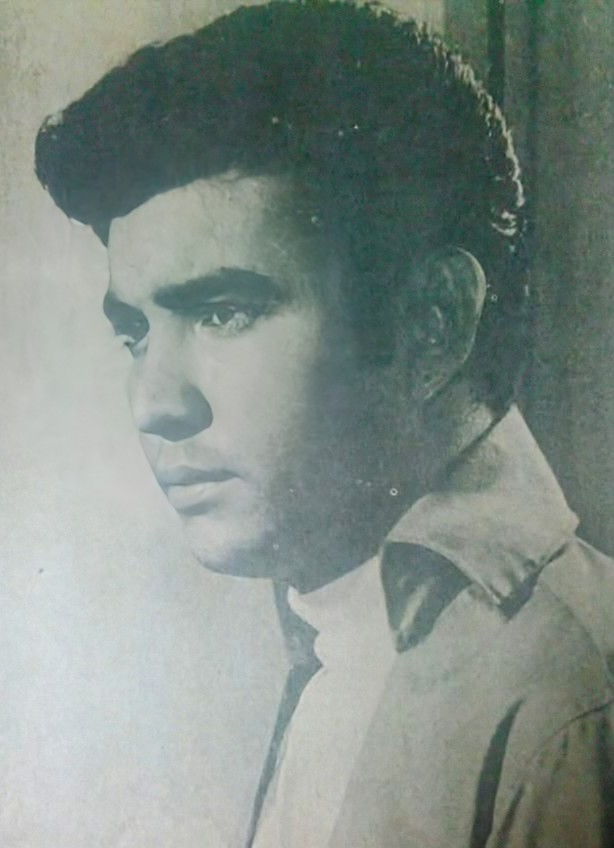
- Rivero in 1969
- Born: Luisito Ramos Meyer Jr. August 5, 1946 (age 79); Manila, Philippines
- Occupations: Actor, film producer
- Years active: 1967–present
- Children: Michael, JV, Danny Boy, Rosemarie, Dante Jr., Louisito, and Vangie

Luisito Ramos Meyer Jr. (born August 5, 1946), known professionally as Dante Rivero, is a Filipino film and television actor who has won a FAMAS award and nominated for a Gawad Urian Award.

== Filmography ==
=== Film ===
Year	Title	Role
1967	Batman Fights Dracula	Dracula
1970	Wanted: Perfect Mother	Dante
1970	Santiago!	Celso
1973	Lupang Hinirang	
1974	Patayin Mo sa Sindak si Barbara	Fritz Martinez
1980	Anak ng Atsay	
1981	Sisang Tabak	
1981	Karma	Enrico
1985	Bala Ko ang Hahatol	
1985	Hinugot sa Langit	
1987	Kung Aagawin Mo ang Lahat sa Akin	Don Gilbert Andrada
1988	Ang Anino ni Asedillo	Sangre
1988	Natutulog Pa ang Diyos	Bernardo Ramirez
1988	Dugo ng Pusakal	
1988	Pepeng Kuryente: Man with a Thousand Volts	Dennis
1989	Aso't Pusa	
1993	Ronquillo: Tubong Cavite, Laking Tondo	Sgt. Pedring Ronquillo
1994	Pangako ng Kahapon	
1994	Forever	Iking
1996	Kristo	Nicodemus
1997	Paano ang Puso Ko?	Renato
1997	Milagros	Nano
1998	Strebel: Gestapo ng Maynila	Capt. Dovino
1998	Kay Tagal Kang Hinintay	Mr. Medina
1999	Di Puwedeng Hindi Puwede	Mondragon
1999	Esperanza: The Movie	Juan Salgado
2000	Azucena	Teban
2001	Tuhog	Leon
2002	Kailangan Kita	Ka Pinong
2002	Lapu-Lapu	Magellan
2003	Walang Kapalit	Popoy
2005	Nasaan Ka Man	Don Augusto
2005	La Visa Loca	Mr. Nato
2006	TxT	Mang Dante
2007	A Love Story	Sergio Montes
2008	Anak ng Kumander	Commander Oyong
2008	A Very Special Love	Luis Montenegro
2009	You Changed My Life	Luis Montenegro
2009	Tarot	El Señor
2009	Ang Darling Kong Aswang	Do
2010	Working Girls	Ronald Casuga
2010	Mahilig	
2011	In the Name of Love	Roger
2011	Forever and a Day	Tatang
2011	My House Husband: Ikaw Na!	Delfin
2011	Manila Kingpin: The Asiong Salonga Story	Luis
2013	It Takes a Man and a Woman	Luis Montenegro
2014	1st Ko Si 3rd	
2014	The Janitor	Crisanto's Dad
2020	Suarez: The Healing Priest	Bishop Antonio Palang
2021	Love or Money	Tatay Perts
2023	GomBurZa	Padre Mariano Gomez

=== Television ===
Year	Title	Role
1987	Maricel Regal Drama Special	Mr. Silva
1997–1999	Esperanza	Juan Salgado
1998	Sa Sandaling Kailangan Mo Ako	Julio Morales
1999	Maalaala Mo Kaya: Tula	Dad
2001	Recuerdo de Amor	Antonio Sebastian / Enrico Villafuerte
2003	Darating ang Umaga	Don Lucio Reigo-De Dios
2004	Maynila	Various
2006	Captain Barbell	Lolo Aloy
2007	La Vendetta	Edwin Cardinale
2008	Maalaala Mo Kaya: Mesa	Pedro
2008	Lobo	Gen. Leon Cristobal
2008	Luna Mystika	Don Joaquin Sagrado / Agnon
2009	Zorro	Magistrate of Angeles
2009	Komiks Presents: Nasaan Ka Maruja?	Old Gabriel
2009	May Bukas Pa	Don Miguel Delgado
2009	Sana Ngayong Pasko	Pablo Dionisio
2010	Rubi	Dr. Jose Bermudez
2010	Maalaala Mo Kaya: School Building	Melencio Morales
2011	Minsan Lang Kita Iibigin	Gen. Eduardo Marcelo
2011	Wansapanataym: Batang Chalk	Eugeniano
2011	100 Days to Heaven	Gen. Salazar
2011	Budoy	Renato Dizon
2012	Princess and I	Maja Raja Hwan Chuk
2012	Maalaala Mo Kaya: T-shirt	Domeng
2012	Luna Blanca	Lolo Igme Sagrado
2012	The Good Daughter	Berting
2012	Walang Hanggan	Teban
2012	Maalaala Mo Kaya: Kabibe	Lito
2012	Magpakailanman: The Mirriam Castillo Story	George Castillo
2013	Indio	Tarong
2013	Wanspanataym: Tago, Diego, Tago	Badong
2013	Muling Buksan ang Puso	Bernardo Beltran
2013	Adarna	Uwarko
2013	Wansapanataym: The Christmas Tablet	Boss Nazareno
2014	Niño	Don Pedro Sagrado
2015	Nathaniel	Serafin Pelaez
2015	Princess in the Palace	Thomas
2015	And I Love You So	Señor Andres Jimenez
2016	Ipaglaban Mo: Engkwentro	Eddie
2017	Maalaala Mo Kaya: Bahay	Jose
2017	FPJ's Ang Probinsyano	Domingo "Amang/Lawin" Bulaon
2017	Ikaw Lang ang Iibigin	Ben Salcedo
2018	The Blood Sisters	Fabian Solomon
2018	Ngayon at Kailanman	Julian Cortes
2018	Precious Hearts Romances Presents: Los Bastardos	Don Ismael A. Cardinal
2019	Nang Ngumiti ang Langit	David Villaluna
2020	Bilangin ang Bituin sa Langit	Ramon Santos
2025–2026	FPJ's Batang Quiapo	Gustavo Guerrero

== Awards and nominations ==
=== Film ===
Year	Award-giving body	Category	Work	Result
2008	26th Luna Awards	Best Supporting Actor	A Love Story	Won
