= List of awards and nominations received by Eddie Garcia =

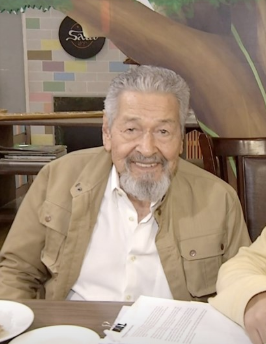
Garcia in 2019

Eddie Garcia is a Filipino actor and filmmaker who has received numerous accolades for his work on film and television. He made his first screen appearance in Siete Infantes de Lara (1950) and has since appeared in film and television productions of various genres, both in lead and supporting roles. He is regarded as the most awarded Filipino actor in history. The Far East Film Festival named him one of the most prolific actors in Asia.

Garcia is the most decorated actor in FAMAS Awards history. He was inducted into the Hall of Fame under three categories, the most for any Filipino actor. He has won a record of six FAMAS Award for Best Actor for his roles in De Colores (1968), Tubog sa Ginto (1970), Minsan Pa Nating Hagkan ang Nakaraan (1983), Bakit May Kahapon Pa? (1996), and Bahid (2002). Garcia has also won five FAMAS Award for Best Supporting Actor: Taga sa Bato (1957), Condenado (1958), Tanikalang Apoy (1959), Ito ang Pilipino (1966), and Dugo ng Bayani (1969). He has won five FAMAS Award for Best Director: Pinagbuklod ng Langit (1969), Sinasamba Kita (1982), Magdusa Ka (1986), Saan Nagtatago ang Pag-ibig? (1987), and Imortal (1989).

Garcia received continuous critical success in the 2000s. He won his first Gawad Urian for Best Actor for his portrayal of an aged convict in the action crime drama Deathrow (2000). His directorial work in Abakada... Ina (2001) earned him the Luna Award for Best Director. For his portrayal of the patriarch of a Chinese Filipino clan in the family drama Mano Po (2002), he won the Metro Manila Film Festival Award for Best Actor. The same year, he was awarded the Star Award for Best Drama Actor in the political drama Kung Mawawala Ka. His role in the comedy drama Fuchsia (2009) earned him the Golden Screen Award for Best Performance by a Lead Actor.

Garcia attained international acclaim in his later years. For his portrayal of an aged gay man in the comedy drama Bwakaw (2012), he was awarded the Asian Film Award for Best Actor in Hong Kong. For the same film, he was named Best Actor at the Asia-Pacific Film Festival in Macau. In 2016, he received a nomination for Best Supporting Actor in a Foreign Language Film at Berlin International Film Festival for his portrayal of a bishop in the religious drama Iadya Mo Kami. Further acclaim came with his portrayal of a closeted retired politician in Rainbow's Sunset (2018), his final film role, where he won Best Actor at the Worldfest Houston International Film Festival in New York.

== Accolades ==
Awards and nominations received by Eddie Garcia
Award (Note: Awards, festivals, honors and other miscellaneous organizations are listed in alphabetical order.)	Year (Note: Indicates the year of ceremony. Each year is linked to the article about the awards held that year, wherever possible.)	Nominated work	Category	Result	Ref.
Alta Media Icon Awards	2015	Eddie Garcia	Iconic Media Personality for Film and Television	Won	
Asian Film Awards	2012	Bwakaw	Best Actor	Won	
Asian Film Awards	2012	Bwakaw	People's Choice Award for Favorite Actor	Won	
Asia-Pacific Film Festival	2012	Bwakaw	Best Actor	Won	
Berlin International Film Festival	2016	Iadya Mo Kami	Best Supporting Actor in a Foreign Language Film	Nominated	
Box Office Entertainment Awards	1992	Eddie Garcia	All Time Favorite Actor of RP Movies	Won	
Box Office Entertainment Awards	2019	Rainbow's Sunset	Golden Jury Award for All Time Favorite Actor	Won	
Cinemalaya Independent Film Festival	2005	ICU Bed #7	Best Actor	Won	
Cinemalaya Independent Film Festival	2012	Bwakaw	Best Actor	Won	
Cinemalaya Independent Film Festival	2018	ML	Best Actor	Won	
Cinemanila International Film Festival	2001	Eddie Garcia	Lifetime Achievement Award	Won	
FAMAS Awards	1957	Gilda	Best Supporting Actor	Nominated	
FAMAS Awards	1958	Taga sa Bato	Best Supporting Actor	Won	
FAMAS Awards	1959	Anino ni Bathala	Best Supporting Actor	Nominated	
FAMAS Awards	1959	Condenado	Best Supporting Actor	Won	
FAMAS Awards	1960	Tanikalang Apoy	Best Supporting Actor	Won	
FAMAS Awards	1961	Gumuhong Bantayog	Best Supporting Actor	Nominated	
FAMAS Awards	1965	Markong Bagsik	Best Supporting Actor	Nominated	
FAMAS Awards	1967	Sabotage	Best Director	Nominated	
FAMAS Awards	1967	Ito ang Pilipino	Best Supporting Actor	Won	
FAMAS Awards	1968	Valiente Brothers	Best Supporting Actor	Nominated	
FAMAS Awards	1969	De Colores	Best Actor	Won	
FAMAS Awards	1970	Dugo ng Bayani	Best Supporting Actor	Won	
FAMAS Awards	1970	Pinagbuklod ng Langit	Best Director	Won	
FAMAS Awards	1971	Pipo	Best Supporting Actor	Nominated	
FAMAS Awards	1971	Crisis	Best Director	Nominated	
FAMAS Awards	1971	Tubog sa Ginto	Best Actor	Won	
FAMAS Awards	1972	Reaching the Top	Best Supporting Actor	Nominated	
FAMAS Awards	1972	Lumuha Pati mga Anghel	Best Actor	Nominated	
FAMAS Awards	1973	Til Death Do Us Part	Best Supporting Actor	Nominated	
FAMAS Awards	1974	Nueva Vizcaya	Best Supporting Actor	Won	
FAMAS Awards	1975	Eddie Garcia	Hall of Fame for Best Supporting Actor	Won	
FAMAS Awards	1976	Mister Mo, Lover Boy Ko	Best Actor	Nominated	
FAMAS Awards	1979	Atsay	Best Director	Nominated	
FAMAS Awards	1983	Sinasamba Kita	Best Director	Won	
FAMAS Awards	1984	Paano Ba ang Pangarap?	Best Director	Nominated	
FAMAS Awards	1984	Minsan Pa Nating Hagkan ang Nakaraan	Best Actor	Won	
FAMAS Awards	1986	Miguelito: Batang Rebelde	Best Actor	Nominated	
FAMAS Awards	1987	Magdusa Ka	Best Director	Won	
FAMAS Awards	1988	Saan Nagtatago ang Pag-ibig?	Best Director	Won	
FAMAS Awards	1989	Huwag Mong Itanong Kung Bakit	Best Director	Nominated	
FAMAS Awards	1990	Imortal	Best Director	Won	
FAMAS Awards	1991	Eddie Garcia	Hall of Fame for Best Director	Won	
FAMAS Awards	1992	Boyong Mañalac: Hoodlum Terminator	Best Actor	Nominated	
FAMAS Awards	1997	Bakit May Kahapon Pa?	Best Actor	Won	
FAMAS Awards	1998	Mariano Mison...NBI	Best Actor	Nominated	
FAMAS Awards	1999	Sambahin ang Ngalan Mo	Best Actor	Nominated	
FAMAS Awards	2002	Eddie Garcia	Lifetime Achievement Award	Won	
FAMAS Awards	2003	Bahid	Best Actor	Won	
FAMAS Awards	2004	Eddie Garcia	Hall of Fame for Best Actor	Won	
FAMAS Awards	2006	Eddie Garcia	FPJ Memorial Award	Won	
FAMAS Awards	2019	ML	Best Actor	Won	
Film Development Council of the Philippines	2020	Eddie Garcia	Posthumous Award	Won	
Gawad Pasado	2012	Eddie Garcia	Lifetime Achievement Award	Won	
Gawad Pasado	2013	Bwakaw	Best Actor	Won	
Gawad Pasado	2019	Rainbow's Sunset	Best Actor	Won	
Gawad Tanglaw	2013	Eddie Garcia	Lifetime Achievement Award	Won	
Gawad Urian	1979	Atsay	Best Director	Nominated	
Gawad Urian	1986	Miguelito	Best Actor	Nominated	
Gawad Urian	1991	Gumapang Ka sa Lusak	Best Supporting Actor	Nominated	
Gawad Urian	1997	Bakit May Kahapon Pa?	Best Actor	Nominated	
Gawad Urian	2001	Deathrow	Best Actor	Won	
Gawad Urian	2006	Eddie Garcia	Lifetime Achievement Award	Won	
Gawad Urian	2013	Bwakaw	Best Actor	Nominated	
Gawad Urian	2019	ML	Best Actor	Won	
Gawad Urian	2019	Hintayan ng Langit	Best Actor	Nominated	
Golden Screen Awards	2005	Magpakailanman	Outstanding Supporting Actor in a Drama Special	Nominated	
Golden Screen Awards	2006	Blue Moon	Best Performance by an Actor in a Leading Role (Drama)	Nominated	
Golden Screen Awards	2007	I Wanna Be Happy	Best Performance by an Actor in a Lead Role (Musical or Comedy)	Nominated	
Golden Screen Awards	2009	Fuschia	Best Performance by an Actor in a Lead Role (Musical or Comedy)	Won	
Golden Screen Awards	2013	Eddie Garcia	Dekada Award	Won	
Golden Screen Awards	2013	Bwakaw	Best Performance by an Actor in a Leading Role (Drama)	Won	
International Film Festival Manhattan	2019	Rainbow's Sunset	Best Ensemble Cast	Won	
Luna Awards	1987	Nasaan Ka Nang Kailangan Kita	Best Supporting Actor	Nominated	
Luna Awards	1987	Magdusa Ka!	Best Director	Won	
Luna Awards	1988	Saan Nagtatago ang Pag-ibig?	Best Director	Won	
Luna Awards	2001	Deathrow	Best Actor	Won	
Luna Awards	2002	Abakada... Ina	Best Director	Won	
Luna Awards	2005	Mano Po III: My Love	Best Supporting Actor	Nominated	
Luna Awards	2006	Blue Moon	Best Actor	Nominated	
Luna Awards	2007	Til I Met You	Best Supporting Actor	Nominated	
Luna Awards	2007	I Wanna Be Happy	Best Actor	Nominated	
Luna Awards	2013	Bwakaw	Best Actor	Nominated	
Luna Awards	2013	Eddie Garcia	Lifetime Achievement Award	Won	
Luna Awards	2017	Eddie Garcia	Golden Reel Award	Won	
Luna Awards	2019	Rainbow's Sunset	Best Actor	Nominated	
Manila Film Festival	1973	Nueva Vizcaya	Best Supporting Actor	Won	
Manila Film Festival	1991	Boyong Mañalac	Best Actor	Won	
Metro Manila Film Festival	1978	Atsay	Best Director	Won	
Metro Manila Film Festival	1989	Imortal	Best Director	Won	
Metro Manila Film Festival	1992	Andres Manambit	Best Actor	Nominated	
Metro Manila Film Festival	1997	Eddie Garcia	Cinema's Living Treasures	Won	
Metro Manila Film Festival	2002	Mano Po	Best Actor	Won	
Metro Manila Film Festival	2011	Eddie Garcia	Lifetime Achievement Award	Won	
Metro Manila Film Festival	2018	Rainbow's Sunset	Best Actor	Nominated	
Metro Manila Film Festival	2018	Rainbow's Sunset	Special Jury Award	Won	
National Commission for Culture and the Arts	2021	Eddie Garcia	Ani ng Dangal	Won	
PeopleAsia	2013	Eddie Garcia	People of the Year	Won	
QCinema International Film Festival	2018	Hintayan ng Langit	Best Actor	Won	
Singkwentro International Film Festival	2019	Eddie Garcia	Lifetime Achievement Award	Won	
Star Awards for Movies	1988	Saan Nagtatago ang Pag-ibig?	Movie Director of the Year	Won	
Star Awards for Movies	1997	Bakit May kahapon pa?	Movie Actor of the Year	Nominated	
Star Awards for Movies	2005	Mano Po III: My Love	Movie Actor of the Year	Nominated	
Star Awards for Movies	2006	ICU Bed #7	Movie Actor of the Year	Nominated	
Star Awards for Movies	2013	Bwakaw	Movie Actor of the Year	Nominated	
Star Awards for Movies	2014	Boy Golden: Shoot to Kill	Movie Supporting Actor of the Year	Nominated	
Star Awards for Movies	2019	Rainbow's Sunset	Movie Actor of the Year	Nominated	
Star Awards for Movies	2019	Rainbow's Sunset	Movie Ensemble Acting of the Year	Won	
Star Awards for Movies	2019	Eddie Garcia	Outstanding Star of the Century	Won	
Star Awards for Television	2002	Kung Mawawala Ka	Best Drama Actor	Won	
Star Awards for Television	2003	Kung Mawawala Ka	Best Drama Actor	Nominated	
Star Awards for Television	2004	Narito ang Puso Ko	Best Drama Actor	Nominated	
Star Awards for Television	2008	Maalaala Mo Kaya	Best Single Performance by an Actor	Nominated	
Star Awards for Television	2012	Babaeng Hampaslupa	Best Drama Actor	Nominated	
Star Awards for Television	2014	Honesto	Best Drama Supporting Actor	Nominated	
Star Awards for Television	2015	Give Love on Christmas	Best Drama Actor	Nominated	
Star Awards for Television	2016	Ang Probinsiyano	Best Drama Supporting Actor	Nominated	
Star Awards for Television	2019	Eddie Garcia	Posthumous Award as Icon of Philippine Television	Won	
The EDDYS	2018	Eddie Garcia	Film Icon Award	Won	
The EDDYS	2019	Rainbow's Sunset	Best Actor	Nominated	
Worldfest Houston International Film Festival	2019	Rainbow's Sunset	Best Actor	Won	
