= Eddie Garcia filmography =

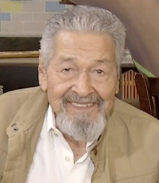
Garcia in 2019

Eddie Garcia (May 2, 1929 – June 20, 2019) was a Filipino actor and director. He worked in almost 700 film and television roles in a career spanning seven-decades. His best regarded works include: Beast of the Yellow Night (1971), The Woman Hunt (1972), Atsay (1978), Magdusa Ka! (1986), Saan Nagtatago ang Pag-ibig? (1987), Asin at Paminta (1999), Deathrow (2000), The Debut (2001), Abakada... Ina (2001), Bwakaw (2012), ML, Hintayan ng Langit, and Rainbow's Sunset (2018).

== Filmography ==
=== Film ===
==== 1940s ====
Year	Title	Role	Date Released	Film Distributor
1949	Siete Infantes de Lara		???	MC Productions

==== 1950s ====
Year	Title	Role	Date Released
1952	Tulisang Pugot	Don Fernando	August 23, 1952
1957	Mga Ligaw na Bulaklak	Conrado	August 2, 1957
1958	Anino ni Bathala	Edgar	April 19, 1958
1959	Kamandag	Silvestre	August 28, 1959
1959	Mga Anghel sa Lansangan	Leon	September 17–25, 1959
1959	Kilabot sa Makiling	Victor	December 11, 1959

==== 1960s ====
Year	Title	Role	Date Released
1960	Lupa sa Lupa	Bert	January 10–19, 1960
1966	Ibulong Mo sa Hangin	Don Eduardo Escudero	September 2, 1966
1967	Maruja	Spanish Governor General	February 14, 1967
1968	Abdul Tapang	Brunong Scout	August 11, 1968
1968	Pablo S. Gomez' Triple	Dexter	November 27, 1968
1969	The Mad Doctor of Blood Island	Monster	May 11, 1969

==== 1970s ====
Year	Title	Role	Date Released
1970	Pablo S. Gomez' Durando	Don Sebastian	October 3, 1970
1971	Tubog sa Ginto	Don Benito	January 20, 1971
1971	Beast of Blood	Dr. Lorca	January 27, 1971
1971	Lumuha Pati Mga Anghel	Asyong	May 21, 1971
1971	Pagdating sa Dulo	Film Director	June 10, 1971
1971	Stardoom	Asiong	October 8, 1971
1971	Gabriela Silang	Don Manuel de Arza	November 24, 1971
1972	The Twilight People	Juan Pereira	June 1972
1972	The Woman Hunt	Spyros	November 1972
1973	Black Mama, White Mama	Captain Cruz	January 19, 1973
1973	Beyond Atlantis	The Mate	September 1973
1974	Bamboo Gods and Iron Men	Ambrose	January 1974
1974	The Game of Death	Colonel Von Stoffer	March 22, 1974
1974	Tinimbang Ka Ngunit Kulang	Mr. Cesar Blanco	May 30, 1974
1974	Savage Sisters	Captain Juan Morales	September 4, 1974
1974	Black Mamba		1974
1975	Babae... Hindi Ka Dapat Nilalang!	Rafael	March 14, 1975
1975	Fortress in the Sun	Don Eduardo de Leon	April 24, 1975
1976	Walang Karanasan	Paulo	June 4, 1976
1976	Ganito Kami Noon... Paano Kayo Ngayon?	Don Tibor	December 25, 1976
1977	Sudden Death	Raoul Hidalgo	May 1977
1977	Hostage!... Hanapin si Batuigas!	Kidnapper	June 23, 1977
1977	Celso Ad Castillo's Maligno	Lucas Santander	December 24, 1977
1977	Ishmael Bernal's Walang Katapusang Tag-Araw	Leo	December 24, 1977
1979	Aliw-iw	Elyong	September 28, 1979
1979	Alabok Na Ginto		December 25, 1979
1979	Ang Alamat ni Julian Makabayan	Catholic Parish Priest	December 25, 1979

==== 1980s ====
Year	Title	Role	Date Released
1980	Aguila	Don Simeon Garrido	February 14, 1980
1980	Si Malakas, si Maganda at si Mahinhin	Mr. Zapanta	March 14, 1980
1980	Mission: Terrorize Panay	Manolo "Kumander Vergara" Nave	July 27, 1980
1980	Kalibre .45	Ramon's father	September 5, 1980
1980	Kaladkarin	Don Santiago Mondragon	December 5, 1980
1980	Dang-Dong	Lucio	December 25, 1980
1981	Alfredo Sebastian	Commander Gaya	April 18, 1981
1981	Dear Heart	Don Manolo	July 24, 1981
1981	Sambahin ang Ngalan Mo	Señor Segovia	October 3, 1981
1981	P. S. I Love You	Emilio	November 2, 1981
1983	Palabra de Honor	Don Adolfo	February 10, 1983
1983	Kapag Buhay ang Inutang	Barracuda	June 16, 1983
1983	Atsay Killer	Don Mariano Badicadeza	August 2, 1983
1983	Nagalit ang Buwan sa Haba ng Gabi	Dimitri de Joya	August 4, 1983
1983	Kunin Mo ang Ulo ni Magtanggol	Don Miguel	November 24, 1983
1983	Minsan Pa Nating Hagkan ang Nakaraan	Cenon	December 7, 1983
1983	Hanguin Mo Ako sa Putik		December 9, 1983
1984	Erpats Kong Forgets	JR	January 14, 1984
1984	Kung Mahawi Man ang Ulap	Pablo Acuesta	January 19, 1984
1984	Sana, Bukas Pa ang Kahapon	Peter	April 28, 1984
1984	May Lamok sa Loob ng Kulambo	Lauro Rivas	May 4, 1984
1984	May Daga sa Labas ng Lungga	Lauro Rivas	October 19, 1984
1984	Kapag Baboy ang Inutang	Tandang Kulas	November 29, 1984
1984	Life Begins at 40	Nelson	December 7, 1984
1984	Atsay Killer 2: Buti Nga Sa 'Yo!	Don Mariano Badicadeza	December 25, 1984
1985	Pati Ba Pintig ng Puso?	Señor Griego	July 31, 1985
1985	Tinik sa Dibdib	Mang Tibo	November 6, 1985
1985	Public Enemy No. 2: Maraming Number Two	Manoy	1985
1985	Iligpit ang Supremo	Gen. Rios	1985
1986	Kamagong	Mr. Guevarra	February 4, 1986
1986	Muslim .357	Captain Rios	July 31, 1986
1986	Nasaan Ka Nang Kailangan Kita	Julio	September 18, 1986
1986	Gabi Na, Kumander	General Benitez	November 20, 1986
1987	Ultimatum: Ceasefire!	Col. Gregorio Santos	April 2, 1987
1987	Batas sa Aking Kamay	Major	June 4, 1987
1987	Pinulot Ka Lang sa Lupa	Diony	October 16, 1987
1987	Kapag Puno Na ang Salop	Judge Ricardo Valderrama	November 26, 1987
1988	Ibulong Mo sa Diyos	Emmanuel Vera	February 4, 1988
1988	Afuang: Bounty Hunter	Mr. Lauro Glorietta	February 25, 1988
1988	Nakausap Ko ang Birhen	Apiong	March 24, 1988
1988	Nasaan Ka, Inay?	Badong	May 5, 1988
1988	Puso sa Puso	Daniel's grandfather	May 25, 1988
1988	Ang Supremo		July 21, 1988
1988	Sgt. Ernesto 'Boy' Ybañez: Tirtir Gang	Greg	July 28, 1988
1988	Stomach In, Chest Out	Major Catacutan	August 11, 1988
1988	Iyo ang Batas, Akin ang Katarungan	Mayor Oliva	September 22, 1988
1988	Sandakot Na Bala	Daniel	November 8, 1988
1988	Lord, Bakit Ako Pa?	Emman	December 7, 1988
1988	Chinatown: Sa Kuko ng Dragon	Maj. Mario G. Robles	December 8, 1988
1988	One Two Bato, Three Four Bapor		December 14, 1988
1989	Si Baleleng at ang Gintong Sirena	Mario	January 4, 1989
1989	Sgt. Niñonuevo: The Fastest Gun Alive of WPD	Doming Castel	January 25, 1989
1989	Arrest: Pat. Rizal Alih – Zamboanga Massacre	General Eduardo Batalla	March 8, 1989
1989	Kailan Mahuhugasan ang Kasalanan?	Claudio Escudero	May 11, 1989
1989	Tatak ng Isang Api	Don Marion	May 19,1989
1989	Ang Pumatay ng Dahil sa 'Yo	Col. Mijares	June 1, 1989
1989	Kung Maibabalik Ko Lang	Salvador "Mang Badong" Montalan	July 6, 1989
1989	Handa Na ang Hukay Mo, Calida!	Ka Berong	September 14, 1989
1989	Galit sa Mundo	Don Mariano	October 18, 1989
1989	Jones Bridge Massacre (Task Force Clabio)	Gen. Galido	October 1989
1989	Ako ang Huhusga	Judge Ricardo Valderama	December 19, 1989

==== 1990s ====
Year	Title	Role	References
1990	Ikasa Mo, Ipuputok Ko!	Major Trujillo	February 17, 1990
1990	"Ako ang Batas" -Gen. Tomas Karingal	Brigadier General Tomas Karingal	March 27, 1990
1990	Patigasan ang Labanan	Edong	May 8, 1990
1990	Gumapang Ka sa Lusak	Mayor Edmundo Guatlo	May 17, 1990
1990	Hindi Ka Na Sisikatan ng Araw: Kapag Puno Na ang Salop Part-III	Judge Ricardo Valderama	August 30, 1990
1990	Naughty Boys	Tonyo	October 9, 1990
1990	Bakit Kay Tagal ng Sandali?	Don Edmundo	October 18, 1990
1990	Hepe ...Isasabay Kita sa Paglubog ng Araw	Ex-Police Chief Jose "Pepe" Marasigan	1990
1990	Baril Ko... ang Uusig!	Major Villar	December 25, 1990
1991	My Pretty Baby	Don Luis Tantoco	January 25, 1991
1991	Hinukay Ko Na ang Libingan Mo	Laroza San Vicente	June 5, 1991
1991	Boyong Mañalac: Hoodlum Terminator	Marlon "Boyong" Mañalac	June 20, 1991
1991	Mayor Latigo	Meliton Geronimo	1991
1991	Hukom .45		1991
1992	Cordora: Lulutang Ka sa Sarili Mong Dugo	Gaudencio "Boy" M. Cordora Jr.	June 24, 1992
1992	Magdaleno Orbos: Sa Kuko ng Mga Lawin	Magdaleno Orbos	August 30, 1992
1992	Andres Manambit: Angkan ng Matatapang	Andres Manambit	December 25, 1992
1993	Major Napoleon Velasco: Kumander Kalbo	Major Napoleon Velasco	February 24, 1993
1993	Galvez: Hanggang sa Dulo ng Mundo Hahanapin Kita	Judge Efren Galvez	May 27, 1993
1993	Enteng Manok: Tari ng Quiapo	Vicente "Enteng Manok" Sangel	September 30, 1993
1993	Padre Amante Guerrero: Sa Pagitan ng Langit at Impyerno	Padre Amante Guerrero	1993
1993	Doring Dorobo: Hagupit ng Batas	Doroteo "Doring" Rocha	December 25, 1993
1994	Ultimatum	Ariston Mamaril	February 23, 1994
1994	Marami Ka Pang Kakaining Bigas	Digoy	October 19, 1994
1995	Alfredo Lim: Batas ng Maynila	Alfredo Lim	January 17, 1995
1995	Judge Max Asuncion: Hukom Bitay	Maximiano "Judge Max" Asuncion	September 6, 1995
1996	Papunta Ka Pa Lang, Pabalik Na Ako	Gaston	July 11, 1996
1996	Bakit May Kahapon Pa?	General Valderama	September 18, 1996
1996	Melencio Magat: Dugo Laban sa Dugo	Melencio Magat	November 15, 1996
1997	Emong Salvacion: Humanda Ka, Oras Mo Na!	Raymundo "Emong" Salvacion	January 4, 1997
1997	Mauna Ka... Susunod Ako!	Arthur Alcoba	June 18, 1997
1997	Padre Kalibre	Padre Lazaro	December 25, 1997
1998	Sambahin ang Ngalan Mo!	Don Ramon	December 25, 1998
1999	Tigasin	Sgt. Gregorio Marcial	June 23, 1999
1999	Asin at Paminta	Roman	October 6, 1999

==== 2000s ====
Year	Title	Role	Date Released
2000	Deathrow	Lolo Sinat	December 25, 2000
2000	Matalino Man ang Matsing, Naiisahan Din!	Sgt. Gener Gallardo	March 22, 2000
2001	Sanggano't Sanggago	Waldo	October 10, 2001
2001	Kapitan Ambo: Outside de Kulambo	Kapitan Ambo	November 21, 2001
2002	Mano Po	Don Luis Go	December 25, 2002
2002	Bahid	Lorenzo Lavares	November 27, 2002
2002	Bro... Kahit Saang Engkuwentro	Sgt. Delfin Mijares	January 4, 2002
2003	The Legend: Tomagan	General 1	February 26, 2003
2003	When Eagles Strike	General Espino	June 11, 2003
2003	Masamang Ugat	Apo Roman	July 18, 2003
2003	Chavit	Congressman Claro Crisostomo	November 26, 2003
2004	Mano Po III: My Love	Melencio	December 25, 2004
2005	Terrorist Hunter	Capt. Samson	December 25, 2005
2006	Blue Moon	Manuel Pineda	January 1, 2006
2006	Till I Met You	Señor Manuel	October 11, 2006
2008	Urduja	Lakanpati	June 18, 2008
2009	Fuchsia	Marcelino "Mars"	August 11, 2009
2009	Nobody, Nobody But... Juan	Tu	December 25, 2009

==== 2010s ====
Year	Title	Role	Date Released
2010	Buenavista: Ang Kasaysayan ng Lucena	Don Mariano Zaldeña	June 11, 2010
2010	Machete Maidens Unleashed!	Interviewee	July 24, 2010
2010	Ika-Sampu	General Antonio dela Vega	December 1, 2010
2011	The Unkabogable Praybeyt Benjamin	Minister Marshal Benjamin "Bino" Santos VI	October 26, 2011
2011	Tum: My Pledge of Love	Linda's father	April 6, 2011
2011	Ang Panday 2	Amang Daluyong	December 25, 2011
2012	D' Kilabots Pogi Brothers Weh?!	Police Superintendent	November 28, 2012
2012	Bwakaw	Rene	July 21, 2012
2013	Barber's Tales	Father Arturo	October 18, 2013
2013	The Search for Weng Weng	Interviewee	November 29, 2013
2013	Boy Golden	Atty. Dante Sagalongos	December 25, 2013
2014	The Amazing Praybeyt Benjamin	General Benjamin "Bino" Santos VI	December 25, 2014
2014	Bonifacio: Ang Unang Pangulo	Museum curator	December 25, 2014
2015	Rodski Patotski: Ang Dalagang Baby (short film)		
2016	Iadya Mo Kami		July 2, 2016
2017	Tatlong Bibe	Delfin	March 1, 2017
2017	Carlo J. Caparas' Ang Panday	Old evil spirit	December 25, 2017
2018	ML	Colonel dela Cruz	August 3, 2018
2018	Hintayan ng Langit	Manolo Rivera	November 21, 2018
2018	Rainbow's Sunset	Ramoncito "Ramon" Estrella	December 25, 2018
2019	Sanggano, Sanggago't Sanggwapo	Mr. Russel Flores; posthumous release	September 4, 2019
2019	Circa	Eduardo; posthumous release	September 13, 2019
2019	Kalel, 15	Father George; last film appearance	November 29, 2019

=== Television/digital series ===
Year	Title	Role	Notes
1997–1998	Manoy en Mokong	Manoy	
2000	Munting Anghel		
2002–2003	Kung Mawawala Ka	Leandro Montemayor	
2003–2004	Narito ang Puso Ko	Felipe San Victores	
2004	Marinara	Haring Karfa	
2005	Mars Ravelo's Darna	Mambabarang	
2006	Majika	Markadan	
2007	Mga Kwento Ni Lola Basyang: Ang Binibining Tumalo Sa Hari	Haring Abdul	
2007	Asian Treasures	Professor Wakan U. Matadtu / Supremo / Datu Makatunaw	
2008	Obra: For Love or Money		
2008	Carlo J. Caparas' Joaquin Bordado	General Russo	
2008	Maalaala Mo Kaya: Sing-sing II	Panyong	
2008–2009	LaLola	Don Aguirre Lobregat	
2009	Carlo J. Caparas' Totoy Bato	Coach Fredo	
2009	Mars Ravelo's Darna	Father Mateo	
2009	Pangarap Kong Jackpot	Lolo Hugo	
2010	Pilyang Kerubin	Mang Potpot (Angel of Death)	
2010–2011	Koreana	Chang Hee Jung	
2010	Jillian: Namamasko Po	Zaldy	
2011	Babaeng Hampaslupa	Edward Wong	
2011	Rod Santiago's The Sisters	Mayor Enrique Zialcita	
2011	Iglot	Celso Samar	
2012	Legacy	Don Romualdo Leviste†	Supporting Cast / Anti-Hero
2012	Third Eye	Lolo Gimo	
2012–2013	Aso ni San Roque	Supremo / Police Director Danilo P. Aragon	
2013	Juan dela Cruz	Julian "Lolo Juls" Dela Cruz	
2013	Little Champ	Champion	
2013–2014	Honesto	Lemuel Galang	
2014	Sana Bukas pa ang Kahapon	Magno Ruiz	
2014	Give Love On Christmas	Ernest Aguinaldo	Episode: "The Gift Giver" Lead cast
2015	Wansapanataym	Haring Dimetrius	Episode: "Yamashita's Treasures"; Credited as "Eddie Garcia"
2015	Nathaniel	Moises Macaraig	
2015–2016	The Half Sisters	Eduardo Guevarra-McBride	71 episodes
2015–2016	Little Nanay	Don Miguel "Migz / G Pop" Vallejo	
2017–2018	Wansapanataym	Don Jose	Episode: "Jasmin's Flower Powers"
2015–2019	FPJ's Ang Probinsyano	Don Emilio Syquía / "Señor" Gustavo Torralba	(Garcia's last television series before his death)

=== As director ===
Year	Title	Cast(s)	Date released
1961	Karugtong ng Kahapon	Mario Montenegro, Rita Gomez	November 5, 1961
1965	G-2	Tony Ferrer	January 1965
1966	Sabotage	Tony Ferrer	June 19, 1966
1989	Imortal	Vilma Santos, Christopher de Leon, Cherie Gil, Liza Lorena, Gelli de Belen, Jaclyn Jose, Ricky Davao, Tommy Abuel	December 25, 1989

- Historia de Un Amor (1963)
- Kalaban ng Sindikato (1965)
- G-2: Taga-usig ng Kaaway (1965)
- Sabotage (1966)
- Deadline Agosto 13 (1966)
- Blackmail (1966)
- Pinagbuklod ng Langit (1969)
- Atsay (1978)
- P.S. I Love You (1981)
- Sinasamba Kita (1982)
- Cross My Heart (1982)
- Forgive and Forget (1982)
- Friends in Love (1982)
- Kailan Sasabihing Mahal Kita (1985)
- Palimos ng Pag-ibig (1986)
- Magdusa Ka (1986)
- Huwag Mong Itanong Kung Bakit? (1986)
- Saan Nagtatago ang Pag-ibig (1987)
- Kung Aagawin mo ang Lahat sa Akin (1987)
- Kung Kasalanan Man (1989)
- Imortal (1989)
- Hinukay Ko na ang Libingan Mo (1991)
- Abakada... Ina (2001)
- Crisis (2005)
