= Eddie Garcia =

Filipino actor and filmmaker (1929–2019)

- Garcia in 1969
- Born: Eduardo Verchez Garcia; May 2, 1929; Juban, Sorsogon, Philippine Islands
- Died: June 21, 2019 (aged 90); Makati, Philippines
- Other name: Manoy
- Occupations: Actor; director
- Years active: 1949–2019
- Works: Filmography
- Spouse: Lucilla Scharnberg (m. 1949; died 1995)
- Partner: Lilibeth Romero (1986–2019)
- Children: 4
- Awards: Full list
- Military career
- Allegiance: Philippines; United States
- Branch of Service: Philippine Scouts, US Army; Philippine Army
- Service years: 1946–1949

Eduardo "Eddie" Verchez Garcia (Tagalog: [ˈʔɛdi gaɾˈsɪa]; May 2, 1929 – June 21, 2019), colloquially known as Manoy, was a Filipino actor and filmmaker. Deemed one of the greatest Filipino actors of all time, he was noted for his portrayals of authoritative, antagonistic and comedic characters. He has contributed to nearly 700 film and television productions throughout his career that spanned seventy years.

Following the disbandment of Philippine Scouts in 1949, Garcia was convinced by a friend to audition for film roles. He made his feature film debut in Manuel Conde's Siete Infantes de Lara (1950) and later signed an exclusive contract with Sampaguita Pictures where he was often typecast in villainous roles. He gained critical recognition for his roles in Taga sa Bato (1957), Condenado (1958), and Tanikalang Apoy (1959)—winning the FAMAS Award for Best Supporting Actor for three consecutive years. He expanded into filmmaking in the early 1960s and directed melodrama and action spy-themed films, including Sabotage (1966), the highest-grossing film at the first Manila Film Festival, and the Marcos family romance Pinagbuklod ng Langit (1969) where he won his first FAMAS Award for Best Director.

Garcia explored more complex roles in the 1970s and appeared in several international productions. He portrayed a closeted patriarch in Lino Brocka's Tubog sa Ginto (1971) and won the FAMAS Award for Best Actor. He also directed Atsay (1978), a film about the oppression of domestic workers that won him a Metro Manila Film Festival Award for Best Director. Garcia continued directing high profile films based on comic novels throughout the 1980s, including Sinasamba Kita (1982), Paano Ba ang Mangarap? (1983), Magdusa Ka! (1986), Saan Nagtatago ang Pag-ibig? (1987), and Imortal (1989), the latter three earned him a FAMAS, Luna, and Metro Manila Film Festival Award for Best Director.

In the 1990s, Garcia became one of the major box-office draws as a leading actor in political thrillers and biographical films. In the 2000s, he became active on television and starred in a number of independently produced films. Garcia received international acclaim for his portrayal of a grumpy elderly gay man in Bwakaw (2012), winning an Asia-Pacific Film Festival and Asian Film Award for Best Actor. Following his death in 2019 due to an accident on a production set, the Eddie Garcia Law was enacted in 2024 to protect the welfare and safety of workers in film, television, and advertising.

== Early life and military service ==
Eduardo Verchez Garcia was born on May 2, 1929, in Juban, Sorsogon, into a family of Spanish descent, son of Antonio Garcia and Vicenta Verchez. The eldest of five children, Garcia and his siblings were raised by their grandparents on a farm in Naga, Camarines Sur. His paternal grandfather, who was a captain in the Spanish army, arrived in the Philippines in 1870, married a woman from Pampanga, and decided to settle in Naga. From a young age, Garcia has demonstrated independence, traveling solo between Sorsogon and Manila by age thirteen. He attended Sorsogon Pilot Elementary School before moving to Manila for high school and three years of an A.B. Psychology degree at San Beda College.

At age seventeen, Garcia began his military service in 1946 by enlisting in the Philippine Scouts, a tactical unit of the United States Army. Stationed in Okinawa, Japan, after World War II, he served as a military policeman (MP) within the 116th Military Police Company of the Ryukyus Command. During his 27-month deployment, he attained the rank of sergeant. His military career concluded in 1949 following the disbandment of the Philippine Scouts by the Philippine government under President Elpidio Quirino. Although his commanding officer offered him a recommendation for Officer Candidate School (OCS) and the opportunity to re-enlist in the regular U.S. Army, Garcia opted to return to the Philippines. Shortly after his discharge, he was persuaded by a friend to audition for a film role.

== Career ==
=== Early roles, 1950s ===
Garcia, together with fellow scout George Sanderson, auditioned for Manuel Conde who was then looking for seven men to star in his feature Siete Infantes de Lara. He recalled that preparations for their roles included trainings in fencing and sword fighting for three months. Theatrically released in 1950, the film marked his first screen appearance. While Sanderson eventually went back to the United States to join the Navy, he continued acting. After playing a number of minor roles for LVN Pictures, he became an exclusive contract star of Sampaguita Pictures for fourteen years. His physical appearance and bearing led to him being frequently typecast in villainous roles. Garcia recalled one time he was attacked by an enraged fan who hurt him with an umbrella because his character abused Gloria Romero's character. He did not lash out at the fan, believing "he did a good job in portraying it".

Garcia's next roles gave him critical recognition. From mid to the latter part of the 1950s, he frequently played support to Lolita Rodriguez. He received his first acting award in 1958 for his role in Conrado Conde's Taga sa Bato, winning the FAMAS Award for Best Supporting Actor. This was followed by two more consecutive victories for his roles in Armando Garces' Condenado and Jose de Villa's Tanikalang Apoy in 1959 and 1960, respectively. Garcia became the first and only performer to win the FAMAS Award for best Supporting Actor for three consecutive years.

=== Career expansion, 1960s ===
Garcia expanded into film directing through the romantic drama Karugtong ng Kahapon in 1961, produced by Sampaguita Pictures. His next directorial works were drama-themed films Sapagkat Kami'y Tao Lamang the following year, an official Philippine entry in the Cairo International Film Festival and Historia un Amor in 1963, which competed at the Asian Film Festival.

The increasing popularity of James Bond films in the Philippines during this period benefited Garcia. He directed the action film G-2 (1965), the first of his many collaborations with Tony Ferrer who starred as Tony Falcon in the Agent X-44 film series. The following year, he reunited with Ferrer and directed Sabotage. The film competed at the first edition of Manila Film Festival in 1966 and became the highest-grossing film of that year's festival. In 1969, Garcia was tapped to direct the sequel to Ferdinand Marcos' re-election campaign film Pinagbuklod ng Langit, starring Luis Gonzales and Gloria Romero. The film earned him his first FAMAS Award for Best Director.

=== Unconventional roles, 1970s ===
Garcia's role in Lino Brocka's adaptation of Orlando Andres' comics serial Tubog sa Ginto was a turning point in his career. In the film, he portrayed a closeted married man to which Manila Standard writer Ester Dipasupil called it the role that "vaulted him to stardom", adding: "That role, no actor in his time would touch with a ten-foot pole, earned Eddie more than just the respect of the director." He received his second FAMAS Award for Best Actor. The same year, Garcia reunited with Gloria Romero in Lino Brocka's Lumuha Pati mga Anghel. Portraying the role of an abusive husband, Nestor Torre noted how Brocka gave the ensemble cast a "more realistic framework that made this movie less escapist than most." Also in 1971, Garcia starred opposite Rita Gomez in Ishamel Bernal's first feature film Pagdating sa Dulo. While the film didn't performed well at the box-office, the Manunuri ng Pelikulang Pilipino have included it on their list of the best films of the decade.

Garcia next appeared in several international B films. In 1972, he starred as Captain Cruz in the action thriller Black Mama White Mama. While the film received mixed to unfavorable reviews, his performance was singled out by the critics with Variety stating that he "rises above the material by studious underplaying". The film was also a commercial success, earning $1 million in North American rentals. The following year, Garcia was cast in the action drama film Nueva Viscaya and was one of the entries at the 8th Manila Film Festival. It became the third highest-grossing film of that year's festival with ₱461,405 in box-office receipts and won him his sixth FAMAS Award for Best Supporting Actor. Garcia was inducted into the hall of fame in 1975.

Garcia directed Atsay (1978), a romantic drama starring Nora Aunor as an abused housemaid. Writing for Philippine Daily Inquirer, Nestor Torre named it as one of the best films of that year and noted its "realistic and unmelodramatic view of the lives of domestic helpers." The film competed at the Metro Manila Film Festival where Garcia was awarded Best Director, including nominations for a FAMAS and Gawad Urian.

=== Stardom, 1980–1999 ===
Garcia was tapped to direct a slew of high profile films for Viva Films. He directed Sinasamba Kita (1982), a romantic drama which starred Vilma Santos, Christopher de Leon, Lorna Tolentino, and Philip Salvador. The film was a commercial success at the box-office and earned him a FAMAS Award for Best Director. The following year, he reunited with Santos and De Leon, directing the drama film Paano Ba ang Mangarap?. Leah Salterio of Philippine Daily Inquirer named it the film that "heralded a box-office precedent for komiks novels adapted for big screen."

Garcia directed Magdusa Ka (1986), a drama film which starred Dina Bonnevie. The film earned him his third FAMAS Award for Best Director to which Manila Standard writer Frank S. Mallo criticized, calling it "flawed and unimaginative direction". The following year, he directed Saan Nagtatago ang Pag-ibig. Mike Feria of Manila Standard called the film a "minor directorial triumph" and noted how it "transcended the limitations of the genre." Considered by Garcia as his most memorable directorial project, the film earned him the FAMAS, Star Award for Movies, and Luna Awards for Best Director. Also in 1987, Garcia was cast as Judge Valderama, a corrupt public official, in the action drama Kapag Puno Na ang Salop, starring Fernando Poe Jr.. While Luciano E. Soriano of the Manila Standard criticized the films narrative formula similar from Poe's previous works, he praised the larger-than-life performances of Poe and Garcia. In 1989, Garcia directed Imortal and was released as one of the entries at the 15th Metro Manila Film Festival. The film won eight accolades at the film festival's awards ceremony, including Best Director for Garcia.

In 1990, Garcia starred as an abusive mayor in the political thriller Gumapang Ka sa Lusak. Directed by Lino Brocka, the film earned him a Gawad Urian for Best Supporting Actor nomination. Around this period, he became prominent as a leading actor in high profile action films, mostly in biographical films. His next film role was in Ako ang Batas (1990), a biographical action film where he portrayed former police general Tomas Karingal. The film opened to 51 cinemas across Metro Manila and reportedly "attracted huge crowds and positive reviews" upon release. In 1991, Garcia starred in Boyong Mañalac ,which competed at the Manila Film Festival. The film became the highest-grossing film of that year's festival and earned him a Best Actor trophy. The following year, the biographical film Andres Manambit: Angkan ng Matatapang was released as part of the 18th Metro Manila Film Festival, where Garcia played the title role. The film was one of the most awarded film at the film festival and earned him a nomination for Best Actor. In 1995, Garcia played the title role in another biographical crime drama Judge Max Asuncion: Hukom Bitay. Garcia described the role as "one of the most challenging assignments" of his career.

In 1996, Garcia starred opposite Nora Aunor and Dawn Zulueta in the suspense thriller Bakit May Kahapon Pa?. Writing for Manila Standard, Isah V. Red named it the "most significant Filipino film ever to be screened" that year for its "unorthodox narrative and daring subject". Red also commented on Garcia's performance who wrote in part, "Eddie's excellent portrayal of the stoic military general gives the film its subtle nuance of dialectics." The following year, Garcia starred in the television sitcom Manoy en Mokong, co-starring Janno Gibbs.

=== Continued appearances on-screen, 2000s ===
In 2000, Garcia was cast in an independently produced short film Anino. The film was awarded the Short Film Palme d'Or at the Cannes Film Festival. Raymond Red, the director and producer of the film, later revealed that Garcia offered his services for free. Later that year, Garcia next starred in Deathrow with Cogie Domingo. The film competed at the 26th Metro Manila Film Festival and earned ₱3 million on its first day. The Philippine Daily Inquirer have listed his portrayal of an elderly convict as one of the most outstanding lead performances of that year. For his role, he was awarded Best Actor at the film festival and won two more from Gawad Urian and Luna Awards. The following year, Garcia returned to film directing through Abakada... Ina. In 2002, Garcia starred with an ensemble cast in the drama film Mano Po, an entry to the 28th Metro Manila Film Festival. It was the highest-grossing entry of the film festival that year, grossing over ₱67 million at the box office. While the film earned twelve accolades during the film festival's awarding ceremony, including Best Picture, Lito Zulueta of Philippine Daily Inquirer criticized the film, calling it "overwrought and tabloidish saga" and argued that Dekada '70 was the better film.

During this period, Garcia began to play more roles on television. He portrayed the patriarch of a political family in Kung Mawawala Ka. The series attained high viewership throughout its run and earned him a Star Award for Best Drama Actor. He next appeared in the romantic drama Narito ang Puso Ko (2003) where he played a wicked brother-in-law to Rosa Rosal's character. His role earned him a nomination for a Golden Screen Award for Outstanding Lead Actor and attracted high viewership, receiving a household rating of 22 percent according to Neilsen Media Philippines. In 2005, Garcia played an alcoholic gambler in the independently produced film ICU Bed #7, directed by Rica Arevalo in her feature film directorial debut. An official entry to the first edition of Cinemalaya Philippine Independent Film Festival, Nestor Torre of Philippine Daily Inquirer named it one of Garcia's career best, alongside Tubog sa Ginto, Ganito Kami Noon... Paano Kayo Ngayon?, and Palaban.

Garcia played a terminally ill man in the romantic drama Blue Moon (2006), which competed at the 31st Metro Manila Film Festival. The films box-office receipts exceeded ₱15 million, becoming the sixth highest grossing film at the film festival that year. The same year, he reunited with Gloria Romero in the comedy drama I Wanna Be Happy where they played as an elderly couple. Dolly Ann Carvajal of Philippine Daily Inquirer likened their performance to Jack Nicholson and Meryl Streep for their "impeccable acting". For his role, he earned a Luna Award for Best Actor nomination. In 2008, Garcia voiced a role in the animated historical film Urduja. The planning and production of the film reportedly took eleven years with over 400 Filipino animators contributing 120,000 drawings. The film grossed over ₱31 million at the box-office. In 2009, Garcia starred in an independently produced film Fuchsia with frequent onscreen partner Gloria Romero.

=== International acclaim and final roles, 2010s ===
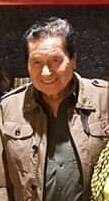
Garcia in 2013

In 2010, Eddie Garcia was interviewed for Mark Hartley's documentary film Machete Maidens Unleashed!, which explores exploitation films that were made in the Philippines in the 1970s and 1980s. Garcia next appeared in the independently produced film Bwakaw (2012), directed by Jun Robles Lana. Writing for Variety, Dennis Harvey cited him as a "veteran of Filipino cinema" and added that he delivered "a pitch-perfect, salty but touching turn". The Hollywood Reporter contributor David Rooney described him as a "national screen superstar" and agreed that Garcia embodied the characters' self-discovery and internal pain. Slant Magazine writer John Semley rated the film three out of four stars and stated that his portrayal provided a "remarkable turn" that anchored the narrative of the film. For the role, Garcia won his first international film award at the 55th Asia-Pacific Film Festival and the Asian Film Award for Best Actor, becoming the only Filipino so far to win the award.

Early in 2013, Garcia was honored with the Dolphy Lifetime Achievement Award during the Entertainment Press Society's Golden Screen TV Awards. Later that year, he was interviewed in the documentary The Search for Weng Weng. In August 2014, Garcia was included in Inside Showbiz magazine's list of the five best living Filipino actors, and the Philippines' Yes! Magazine's list of 100 Most Beautiful Stars. In 2015, Garcia appeared in the television series Little Nanay and portrayed Don Emilio on the Philippines' longest-running action television show FPJ's Ang Probinsyano with Coco Martin from 2016 until 2019. Garcia continued to appear in films; when he reached the age of 89 in 2018, he said that he still accepts offers in acting, adding that "retirement didn't exist in his vocabulary".

Garcia's last notable works were ML, an entry of 14th Cinemalaya Independent Film Festival in which he portrays Colonel dela Cruz, a retired METROCOM colonel suffering from Alzheimer's disease, leading him to believe that he is still living in the Marcos dictatorship. His portrayal in earned him the Gawad Urian's Best Actor. He also appeared in Hintayan ng Langit, an entry in the 2018 QCinema International Film Festival, starring opposite Gina Pareño as a man who is reunited with his ex-girlfriend in Purgatory. For his final film role, Garcia portrayed Ramon, a gay senator who comes out at an advanced age, in Rainbow's Sunset, an entry in the 2018 Metro Manila Film Festival. Rainbow's Sunset was directed by Joel Lamangan. Garcia was nominated for Best Actor but lost to Dennis Trillo.

Garcia then appeared in Rosang Agimat; while filming the show, an accident led to Garcia entering a coma and eventually his death. He had a special participation in the comedy film Sanggano, Sanggago't Sanggwapo, which was released on September 4, 2019, three months after his death. Garcia did not finish filming his required scenes in the movie due to the accident; it was his last appearance in a movie.

== Personal life ==
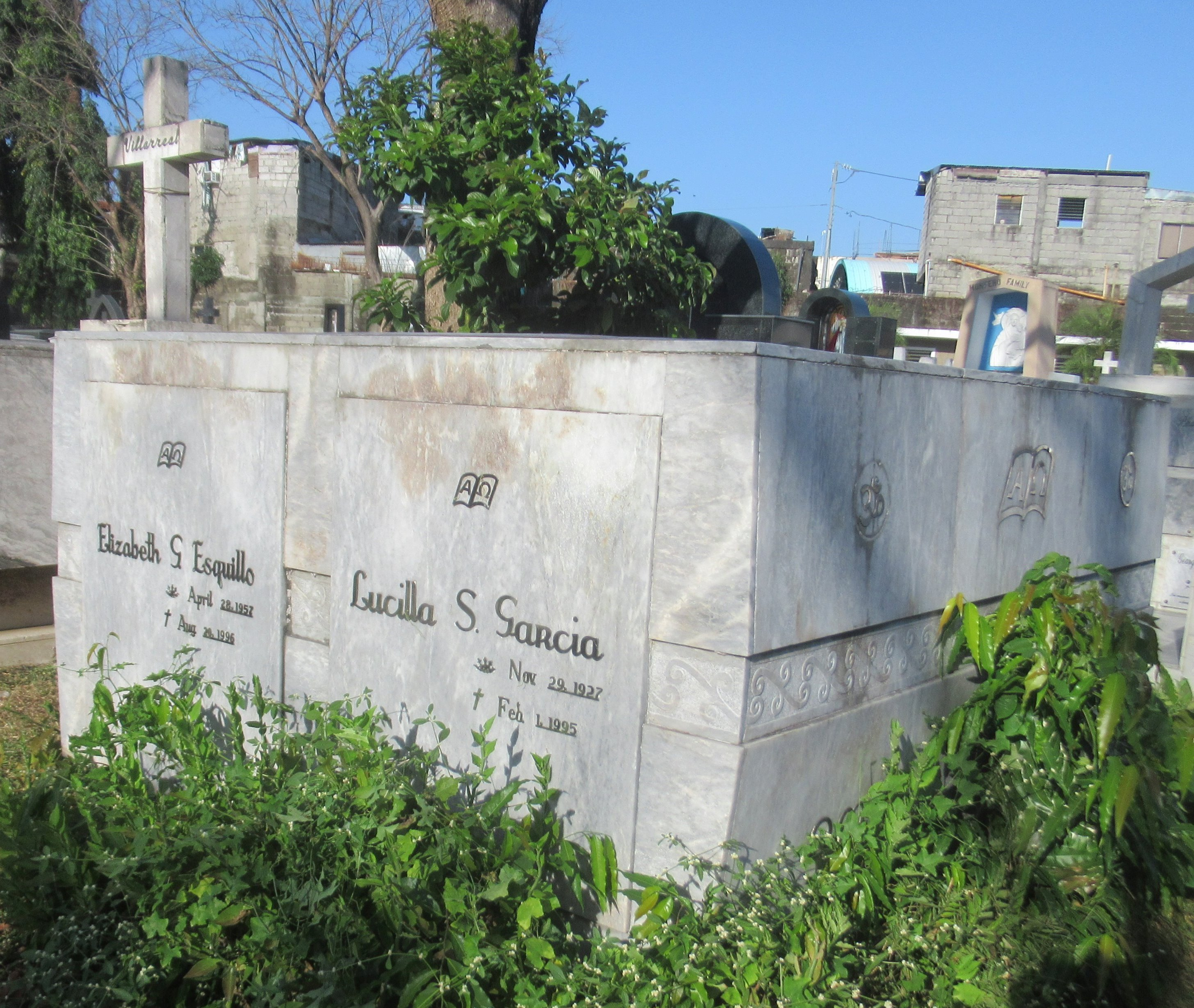
Lucilla Scharnberg Garcia (wife) and Elizabeth Garcia Esquillo (daughter) graves at Manila Memorial Park – Sucat.

Garcia kept most of his life private, viewing his acting profession and personal life as separate. He lived a relatively simple life without any luxury cars and expensive equipment. Throughout his career, he was known for his professionalism, and evaded intrigues and controversies linking him to his fellow co-stars. Film producer Marichu Maceda described Garcia as "a disciplined and independent person, carrying things on his own without needing assistants or managers despite being popular".

Garcia was in a domestic partnership with Lilibeth Romero for 33 years. Before Romero, Garcia was married to Lucilla Scharnberg for 46 years until her death of cancer in 1995. He and Scharnberg had three children: Eduardo "Eddieboy" Jr. (1951–1973), Erwin (March 13, 1956 – March 13, 2021) due to liver disease and Elizabeth (April 28, 1957 — August 29, 1996). Eddieboy died in a motorcycle accident at the age of 22; Garcia called it "the biggest tragedy of his life", feeling guilty because he had gifted to his son the motorcycle his son had ridden. Elizabeth died of a heart attack in 1996. His other daughter lives in San Diego, California.

Garcia said he originally wanted to be either a soldier or a lawyer, saying "Acting is just a job. It's an honest way to make a living." Beyond acting, he was passionate about target shooting as a sport. He was a skilled marksman, having once been a trained soldier. Garcia campaigned for Ako Bicol's party-list in the 2019 Philippine House of Representatives elections as the regional group's primary endorser.

Garcia maintained a healthy lifestyle through exercise, vitamin supplements, and healthy diet, saying he preferred fish and vegetables to meat. Garcia still worked as an actor and director when he turned 90, and he said he still had an active sex life and went to a gym to remain healthy. He described his lifestyle as "everything in moderation: food, work, even fitness, and workout".

== Death and aftermath ==
On June 8, 2019, Garcia was rushed to Mary Johnston Hospital in Tondo, Manila, after tripping on a cable wire and hitting his head on the pavement during a shoot for television series Rosang Agimat. He was then transferred to the intensive care unit (ICU) at Makati Medical Center. The actual incident was captured on video. Initial reports stated Garcia had suffered a heart attack on set, according to his family, but was later found to have suffered a cervical fracture due to the fall.

Garcia's family released a statement contradicting a report that said Garcia suffered a heart attack; they called the initial report "fake news" and said the actor tripped on a cable during filming, and was healthy prior to the incident. A CT scan showed his brain was in a normal state, ruling out the possibility he suffered a stroke. Due to the fracture, Garcia was in a coma. On June 15, his family agreed to place Garcia on do-not-resuscitate status. On June 20, there were minimal signs of brain activity and he remained dependent on a ventilator. The following day, Garcia was pronounced dead at 4:55 pm (GMT+8) at the age of 90. In accordance with his last wishes, immediately after his death, Garcia's remains were cremated and placed inside an olive-green urn. His wake was held at Heritage Memorial Park in Taguig.

=== Aftermath ===
Garcia's accident and death became an issue because there was no standby medical team or ambulance on the set of Rosang Agimat. The unconscious Garcia was lifted from the pavement by non-medical personnel, who carried him to a passing taxicab. Several people, including his wife Lilibeth, said the accident could have been prevented if GMA Network's management had taken safety precautions. The Directors' Guild of the Philippines Inc. (DGPI) referred to Garcia's death as "a sad and urgent reminder to the film and television industries that safety protocols at work and on set are of paramount importance".

The Department of Labor and Employment (DOLE) and the Occupational Safety and Health Center (OSHC) started an investigation into the circumstances of Garcia's accident and death. The OSHC found some occupational safety and health (OSH)-related violations on the part of GMA Network based on an uploaded online video of Garcia's accident, such as lack of first-aid, medical supplies, and a stretcher. They also said Garcia was "carried by personnel using bare hands". On September 4, the DOLE added GMA Network failed to submit an incident report within 24 hours after the accident. On December 23, the DOLE fined GMA Network ₱890,000.00 (about $15,000 US) because of the incident. The network submitted an appeal in response to the ruling.

=== Eddie Garcia Law ===
Garcia's stepson House representative Michael Romero said he would propose an "Eddie Garcia Law" to "safeguard the welfare and well being of all actors working in the television and/or in the movie industries" by compelling production outfits to grant mandatory insurance, providing for working hours in television and movie production, and establishing medical and safety protocols and emergency procedures. House Bill 1270—a consolidation of six similar bills, including one by Romero—passed the House of Representatives on February 7, 2023. The Senate of the Philippines approved on second reading Senate Bill No 2505, the proposed Eddie Garcia law, on February 12, 2024, and was calendared for third and final reading. On May 24, 2024, President Bongbong Marcos signed into law Republic Act 11996 or the "Eddie Garcia Law".

== Legacy ==
[Garcia's] movies consistently reaped profits for producers... His influence on popular culture is convincingly enormous as he has been able to popularized a number of buzzwords including the Bicolano words manoy, or big brother, and uragon which can mean a lot of things in a variety of usage... Eddie's of a rare breed. He is a survivor, a natural performer who can switch from evil to good, loathsome to loveable at a snap of a finger.

— Isah V. Red, Manila Standard (1999),

Garcia has been described as one of the greatest Filipino actors of all time. Writing for the independent online magazine The FilAm, Joel David named Garcia's portrayal of a closeted married man in Tubog sa Ginto (1971) as "the highest peak in male Philippine film performance." In 2001, the Philippine Daily Inquirer asked a number of young viewers about who they think are the best Filipino actors to which a 17-year old from Masbate responded, "Eddie Garcia. He can take on any role given to him... He has no equal." Actor Victor Neri said of Garcia, "[He] is like an idol to every actor. He can handle both bida and kontrabida roles." Boots Anson-Roa, whom Garcia worked with in numerous films, admired his durability which he claims "no one can possibly duplicate" and said, "Eddie can be second lead, a villain, and the lead in the movie. That I think is a rare quality in an actor whom the audience accepts whatever role he plays."

Garcia was one of the most bankable Filipino actors of his generation and the highest-paid Filipino actor cast in villainous roles. Manila Standard contributor Iskho Lopez named him, including Fernando Poe Jr. and Rudy Fernandez, among the biggest Filipino box-office stars, arguing that he was "as durable as Bronson, Quinn and Eastwood, surpassing the track record in boxoffice drawing power of Ramon Revilla... and Dolphy." Also writing for Manila Standard, Ester Dipasupil agreed that Garcia's "name on the marquee... always assures bookers of big box-office takes. And that's the reason why any movie with Eddie in the lead or as support can easily book as many as a hundred theaters in Metro Manila alone." Nestor Torre of Philippine Daily Inquirer have named Garcia, including Nora Aunor, Vilma Santos, Fernando Poe Jr., and Dolphy, among the "local stars who have stayed at the top for decades".

Garcia was the most awarded Filipino actor of all time. He is the most decorated actor in FAMAS Awards history, having been inducted into the hall of fame under three categories. Garcia is also the only actor to win a FAMAS Award for Best Supporting Actor for three consecutive years. His late-career work earned him international recognitions. He won the Asia-Pacific Film Festival Award and Asian Film Award for Best Actor for his role in Bwakaw (2012). For his portrayal in Rainbow's Sunset (2018), he was awarded Best Actor at the Worldfest Houston International Film Festival. The National Commission for Culture and the Arts have also awarded Garcia an Ani ng Dangal, in 2014 and 2021.

=== Directorial style ===
Through his outstanding and prolific body of work, Eddie Garcia is forever etched in the history of Philippine cinema as one of its greatest actors... his masterful contributions as a filmmaker remain provocative, as seen in such film classics as Atsay (1976), Magdusa Ka (1986), and Imortal (1989)... His was a long and inspiring career, whose greatness never waned, even as he generously contributed to the national film culture as an actor right up to the age of 90.

— The Directors’ Guild of the Philippines, Inc (2019),

American filmmaker Quentin Tarantino spoke highly of Garcia's directorial works in 2007, admitting that he grew up watching Filipino films. According to a crew member, who worked with Garcia in Abakada... Ina (2001), Garcia "attended to every production detail" and added, "He was not above carrying props and arranging and rearranging them. He was very meticulous with the blocking and camera position, asking for as many takes as needed for a particular scene." In 2006, Nick Deocampo, director of Mowelfund Film Institute, included Abakada... Ina on his list of the top Filipino films of the last 21 years.

== Filmography ==
The Far East Film Festival named Garcia as one of the most prolific actors in Asia, having contributed to nearly 700 film and television productions, (Note: In 2013, Garcia claimed to have appeared in over 400 films. Estimates from other sources vary, ranging from 300, 500, 600, to nearly 700—a number which usually includes television credits.) both as an actor and director, throughout his career that spanned seventy years. His notable directorial works include Sabotage (1967), Pinagbuklod ng Langit (1969), Crisis (1970), Atsay (1978), Sinasamba Kita (1982), Paano Ba ang Pangarap? (1983), Magdusa Ka (1986), Saan Nagtatago ang Pag-ibig? (1987), Huwag Mong Itanong Kung Bakit (1988), Imortal (1989), and Abakada... Ina (2001)—his final film directorial work. On television, his notable roles include Kung Mawawala Ka (2002), Narito ang Puso Ko (2003), Babaeng Hampaslupa (2011), and Ang Probinsiyano (2015–2019).

His notable works as an actor include Taga sa Bato (1957), Condenado (1958), Tanikalang Apoy (1959), Ito ang Pilipino (1966), Valiente Brothers (1967), De Colores (1968), Dugo ng Bayani (1969), Tubog sa Ginto (1971), Nueva Vizcaya (1973), Minsan Pa Nating Hagkan ang Nakaraan (1983), Miguelito: Batang Rebelde (1985), Boyong Mañalac, Andres Manambit (both in 1991), Bakit May Kahapon Pa? (1996), Mariano Mison...NBI (1997), Sambahin ang Ngalan Mo (1998), Deathrow (2000), Bahid (2002), Mano Po III: My Love (2004), ICU Bed #7 (2005), Blue Moon (2006), Bwakaw (2012), ML, and Rainbow's Sunset (both in 2018).

== See also ==
- List of Philippine actors
- Television in the Philippines
- Asian Film Award for Best Actor
