= Simula sa Gitna =

- Promotional release poster
- Genre: Comedy; Drama
- Written by: Antoinette Jadaone
- Directed by: Antoinette Jadaone
- Starring: Khalil Ramos; Maris Racal
- Country of origin: Philippines
- Original language: Filipino
- No. of seasons: 1
- No. of episodes: 6

Production
- Producers: Bianca Balbuena; Dan Villegas
- Editor: Benjamin Gonzales Tolentino
- Camera setup: Single camera
- Running time: 28-34 minutes
- Production companies: Anima; Project 8

Original release
- Network: Amazon Prime Video
- Release: November 2 – November 30, 2023

Simula sa Gitna (English: Begin in the Middle) is a Philippine comedy drama television miniseries directed and written by Antoinette Jadaone. Produced by Bianca Balbuena and Dan Villegas under Ánima and Project 8, starring Khalil Ramos and Maris Racal in the lead role. A spin-off to Hintayan ng Langit, it aired on Amazon Prime Video from November 2 to November 30, 2023.

== Cast ==
- Khalil Ramos as Andrew
- Maris Racal as Sarah
- Jane Oineza as Missy
- Dolly de Leon as Mayor Susan
- Adrian Lindayag as Carlo
- Gio Alvarez
- Joel Saracho as Elias/Tagasuri
- Meann Espinosa

== Episodes ==
No.	Title	Original release date
1	"No Shit???"	November 2, 2023
2	"I've Had a Taste of That! She's Gamey!"	November 2, 2023
3	"You're Okay. I'm Okay"	November 9, 2023
4	"Once a Whore, Always a Whore"	November 16, 2023
5	"Faggot"	November 23, 2023
6	"I Heard You"	November 30, 2023

== Production ==
The series was announced on Amazon Prime Video. It is a spin-off of the 2018 movie Hintayan ng Langit, directed by Dan Villegas. Khalil Ramos and Maris Racal were cast to appear in the series. Principal photography of the series commenced in March 2023, and concluded in April 2023 at the Manila Central Post Office.

== Release ==
The poster was unveiled on October 19, 2023 and the trailer was released on October 25, 2023.

The series was made available to stream on Amazon Prime Video on November 2, 2023.
