= Dina Bonnevie =

Filipino actress (born 1962)

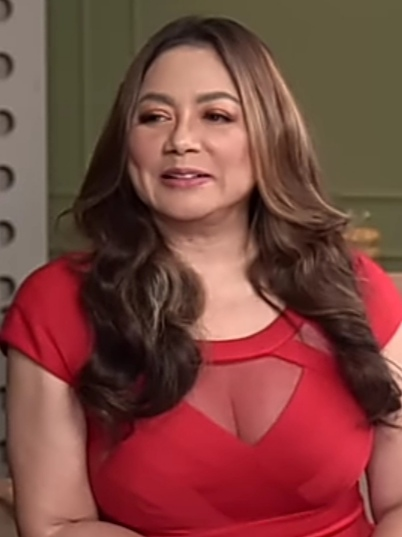
- Bonnevie in 2023
- Born: Geraldyn Schaer Bonnevie; January 27, 1962 (age 64); Quezon City, Rizal, Philippines
- Occupation: Actress
- Years active: 1979–present
- Agents: ATEAM (Alcasid Total Events & Artist Management, Inc.) (2024–present); Viva Artist Agency (1986–present)
- Spouses: Vic Sotto (m. 1982; ann. 1992) Ricardo Penson (m. 1996; ann. 2004) Deogracias Victor Savellano (m. 2012; died 2025)
- Children: 2, including Oyo Boy Sotto

Geraldyn "Dina" Schaer Bonnevie (Tagalog pronunciation: [ˌbɔnɛˈbi, -vi]; born January 27, 1962) is a Filipino actress. She is recognized as the industry's "Drama Queen" of her generation. She has won 2 FAMAS Awards, 2 Luna Awards and multiple 'Best Actress' wins and nominations across all leading award-giving bodies in the country.

Before joining Philippine showbiz, Bonnevie was first runner-up in the 1979 Miss Magnolia beauty contest. Her first film role was in the campy 1980 film Temptation Island. Bonnevie is also best known for her iconic portrayals in Katorse (1980), Under-age (1980), Magdusa Ka! (1986), Ang Babaeng Nawawala sa Sarili (1989), and Gumapang Ka sa Lusak (1990).

== Early life and background ==
Geraldyn Schaer Bonnevie was born on January 27, 1962, to Swiss mother Jeannette Schäer and French-Italian-Filipino father Honesto Bonnevie. Her paternal grandfather was Pedro José de Bonnevie, a significant landowner in the Bicol region, who hails from Évian-les-Bains, France and was part French and Italian. Her grandmother was pre-World War II actress Rosita Rivera, also from Bicol. She is a cousin of singer Lou Bonnevie. She has two children from her previous marriage with comedian Vic Sotto, Oyo Boy Sotto and Danica, both of whom are now in the entertainment industry as well. She was also married to Ricardo Penson from 1996 until her annulment in 1999. In 2012, she married politician Deogracias Victor Savellano, who died in 2025.

She was educated at St. Theresa's College, Manila and finished her elementary and secondary education at St. Agnes' Academy in Legazpi City, where she was very active in drama guilds. In 1979, she was first runner-up in the Miss Magnolia beauty contest, where Joanna Paras took home the title.

In 1980 she enrolled in Communication Arts at the Ateneo de Naga University and, later, at the University of the Philippines. Unfortunately, she did not graduate and finish her degree. Introduced by young actor Alfie Anido to director Joey Gosiengfiao, she first appeared in teen dramas Underage (1980) and Temptation Island (1980), but her breakout movie was Katorse (1980) with Anido and Gabby Concepcion. This film established her as one of the "Regal Babies" (named after the studio, Regal Films). She then appeared in a longer slew of teenage love or growing-pains dramas. Bakit Ba Ganyan? (1981) was a film whose theme song she sang and popularized.

In 1981, she starred in Age Doesn't Matter and was paired with Vic Sotto. What started as a reel romance turned real. The couple started a sitcom from 1982 to 1986 over BBC channel 2 every Saturday at 8 pm entitled, 2 + 2 = Gulo, sharing stellar billing with Maricel Soriano, William Martinez and Herbert Bautista. During this period, she focused on being a homemaker and would occasionally accept showbiz assignments. In-between her domestic life, she was able to finish Mike de Leon's Hindi Nahahati ang Langit in 1985, lending support to Lorna Tolentino, Elwood Perez' Till We Meet Again and Leroy Salvador's Tinik sa Dibdib, both with Nora Aunor.

In 1986, she was relaunched and repackaged by Viva Films as a dramatic actress through the comics-adapted story, Magdusa Ka! Bonnevie earned acting awards for her performance in Magdusa Ka!

== Acting career ==
In 1985, she ventured into dramatic roles, starting with Mike de Leon's Hindi Nahahati ang Langit (1985). She also appeared in the miniseries A Dangerous Life (1988), with American actor Gary Busey; and in the films Orapronobis (1989), Pangarap na Ginto (1990), Huwag mong Salingin ang Sugat ko (1991) and Akin ang Pangarap Mo (1992). In Babaeng Nawawala sa Sarili (1989), Bonnevie played a possessed woman. She also portrayed real-life characters, such as in Eskapo: The Serge Osmena-Geny Lopez Story (1995), as the wife of Geny Lopez; as one of the accused parents in the child-molestation drama, Minsan May Pangarap: The Guce Family Story (1995), shot in New York City; as the girlfriend of activist Leopoldo Mabilangan in Ka Hector (1995); and as Governor Chavit Singson's wife in Chavit (2003), opposite Cesar Montano and Eddie Garcia. She also did some sexy roles in Tag-Araw, Tag-Ulan where she starred with Gary Estrada.

Other notable films where Bonnevie showed maturity as an actress include: Tinik sa Dibdib (1985), for which she won Best Supporting Actress at the Filipino Academy of Movie Arts and Sciences (FAMAS) and Film Academy of the Philippines (FAP) awarding ceremonies; Magdusa Ka (1986), for which she was given Best Actress awards by FAMAS, FAP and Catholic Mass Media Awards; Gumapang Ka sa Lusak (1990), directed by Lino Brocka, for which she was nominated by FAMAS and URIAN Awards for Best Actress; and Sa Kabila ng Lahat (1991), for which she was nominated by FAMAS, FAP and Urian Awards for Best Actress.

Other acting nominations are for Kung Kasalanan Man (1989), FAMAS; Bakit Kay Tagal ng Sandali? (1990), FAP; Tanging Yaman (2000), which won Best Picture in nearly all the local awards ceremonies and gave her an URIAN Best Supporting Actress nomination; American Adobo (2001), URIAN Best Actress nomination; and Bridal Shower (2004), URIAN Best Actress nomination again.

Bonnevie also appeared in comedies with her former husband, Vic Sotto, in Hindi Pa Tapos Ang Labada, Darling! (1994) and Bakit Ba Ganyan? (Ewan ko nga ba, Darling) (2000). When they were still married they also appeared together in Buhay Misis (1983), Ride on Baby (1985) and Mama Said, Papa Said, I Love You (1985). Bonnevie also topbilled Tatarin (2001), based on the short story Summer Solstice by Nick Joaquin; critics nearly panned the movie but appreciated Bonnevie's nuanced characterization of Lupe Moreta.

== Television career ==
Bonnevie started in hot top rating soap operas such as May Bukas Pa with Viva Television and IBC-13 in 1999–2001. In 2001–2003, she joined GMA Network with the evening soap Ikaw Lang ang Mamahalin. In 2003–2004, she starred in another drama, Narito ang Puso Ko and in 2004-2005 she had a lead and recurring role in the critically acclaimed primetime soap opera Hiram, starring Kris Aquino, Mickey Ferriols, Heart Evangelista and Anne Curtis, which also aired internationally through The Filipino Channel earning her praise for her role. From 2005 to 2006, she was seen less on television. In 2007, she came back with soaps like Walang Kapalit and Natutulog Ba Ang Diyos?. After doing projects with ABS-CBN, she decided to do another "Sine Novela", Babangon Ako’t Dudurugin Kita with GMA Network that aired in 2008. In 2009, another soap May Bukas Pa, a religious themed soap (which was the same title as her 2000-2001 soap) and earned her many nominations as the soap ran for a year on television with an ensemble cast. From 2010 to 2012, she joined TV5 doing multiple guestings and drama shows. From 2013 to 2015, she was with ABS-CBN to do Bukas Na Lang Kita Mamahalin, Sana Bukas Pa ang Kahapon, and Two Wives. Bonnevie staged her GMA-7 comeback as the main antagonist of the drama series starring Heart Evangelista and Lovi Poe, Beautiful Strangers.

In 2017, appeared on ABS-CBN's The Blood Sisters, which aired in 2018. After the show ended, Bonnevie transferred back to GMA Network.

Except for her stints on soap operas and for judging a recent TV talent contest (and appearing unclothed on the cover of the local FHM Magazine), Bonnevie disappeared from the limelight throughout 2005 and 2006; she temporarily moved to the United States for business purposes. She was a guest-judge in U Can Dance Version 2.

From 2023 to 2024, Bonnevie portrayed Giselle Marie Tanyag, the sister of RJ Tanyag on one of the top rating medical drama series, Abot-Kamay na Pangarap.

== Music ==
Her first and only album Bakit Ba Ganyan, released in 1981 by Octo Arts International (now PolyEast Records formerly EMI Music Philippines, Inc.), became a Gold Record and Album of the Year. Before her album, she sang a slapstick comedy ballad "Upakan" with Joey de Leon, recorded live on a primetime TV show in 1980.

== Filmography ==
=== Film ===
Year	Title	Role
1980	Temptation Island	Dina Espinola
1980	Katorse	Nene
1980	Underage	Celina
1981	Blue Jeans	
1981	Age Doesn't Matter	
1982	Schoolgirls	Margot
1982	Anak	Sandra
1983	Buhay Misis	Naty
1984	Tender Age	Krystle Dominguez
1985	Hindi Nahahati ang Langit	Cynthia
1985	Tinik sa Dibdib	Corazon
1985	Ride in Baby	Chona
1985	Pati Ba Pinting ng Puso?	Agatha
1985	Mama Said, Papa Said, I Love You	Olive
1985	Till We Meet Again	Maria Louisa (Marilou)
1986	Palimos ng Pag-ibig	Ditas Ocampo
1986	Captain Barbell	Dina
1986	Magdusa Ka	Christine Doliente
1986	The Graduates	
1986	Sanay Wala Nang Wakas	Camille Gonzaga
1986	Huwag Mong Itanong Kung Bakit	Dinia
1987	Working Girls 2	Lomi
1987	Alabok sa Ulap	Eva Baron
1987	Maging Akin Ka Lamang	Elsa Paruel-Abrigo
1988	A Dangerous Life	Celie Balamo
1988	Misis Mo, Misis Ko	Rebecca Martinez
1988	Paano Tatakasan ang Bukas	Desiree Blanco
1989	Ang Lahat ng Ito, Pati na ang Langit	
1989	Ang Babaeng Nawala sa Sarili	Albina
1989	Dahil Minsan Lang	
1989	Kung Kasalanan Man	Irma Ferrer
1990	Pangarap na Ginto	Sheila
1990	Gumapang Ka sa Lusak	Rachel Suarez
1990	Bakit Kay Tagal ng Sandali?	Niña
1991	Sa Kabila ng Lahat	Maia Robles
1991	Huwag Mong Salingin ang Sugat Ko	
1991	Tag-araw, Tag-ulan	Jessie
1992	Manong Gang	Toni
1992	Akin ang Pangarap Mo	Gigi
1993	Kapag Iginuhit ang Hatol ng Puso	Vina
1993	Hanggang Saan, Hanggang Kailan	Blanca Ilustre
1994	Markadong Hudas	Rodelina Vergado
1994	Ultimatum	
1994	Hindi Pa Tapos ang Labada, Darling	Dina Dimasupil
1995	Ka Hector	Ka Hasmin/Teresa
1995	Minsan May Pangarap	Rose Guce
1995	Sana Dalawa ang Puso Ko	Susan
1995	Home Sic Home	Melanie
1995	Eskapo	Chita Lopez
1996	Abot-Kamay ang Pangarap	Carla
1999	Ikaw Lamang	Meg
2000	Bakit Ba Ganyan? (Ewan Ko Nga Ba, Darling)	Mara
2000	Tanging Yaman	Grace
2001	Saan Ako Nagkaganito?	
2001	Tatarin	Doña Lupe Moreta
2002	Batas ng Langsangan	Mariel
2002	Bahid	Loida
2002	American Adobo	Marissa
2003	Bridal Shower	Tates
2003	Noon at Ngayon	Joey
2003	Anghel sa Lupa	Lorna
2004	Beautiful Life	Carmen
2004	I Will Survive	Louise
2011	Who's That Girl?	Jill Pedroza
2013	When the Love Is Gone	Crizelda "Zelda" Kagaoan-Luis
2018	The Significant Other	Jessica

=== Television ===
Year	Title	Role
1982	2 + 2 = Gulo	Dina
1988	Let's Have Dina!	Herself
1990	Boracay	
1993	Maalaala Mo Kaya: Sa Kandungan Mo Inay	Leslie
1996–1999	Ms. D	Herself / Host
1999	D! Day	Herself / Host
2000–2001	May Bukas Pa	Sofia Catacutan-Suarez
2001–2002	Ikaw Lang ang Mamahalin	Martina Buenaventura-Fuentebella
2003–2004	Narito ang Puso Ko	Violeta San Victores
2004–2005	Hiram	Sophia Borromeo
2006	Maalaala Mo Kaya: Poon	Jun's mother
2007	Walang Kapalit	Agnes Santillan-Borromeo
2007	U Can Dance	Main Judge
2007	Sineserye Presents: Natutulog Ba ang Diyos?	Rose Angeles
2008	Babangon Ako't Dudurugin Kita	Evita Gomez-Perantes
2009–2010	May Bukas Pa	Malena Rodriguez-Rodrigo / Malena Rodriguez-Policarpio
2010	Untold Stories Mula sa Face to Face	Various Roles
2010–2011	My Driver Sweet Lover	Aracelli Solis-Barrinuevo
2011	Maalaala Mo Kaya: Liham	Aurora's mother
2011–2012	P. S. I Love You	Kristine Tuazon
2012	Maalaala Mo Kaya: Flower Shop	Bebeng
2013	Bukas na Lang Kita Mamahalin	Victoria Antonio-Ramirez
2014	Sana Bukas pa ang Kahapon	Laura Bayle-Buenavista / Laura Bayle-Syquia
2015	Maalaala Mo Kaya: Mangga at Bagoong	Ferbie / Eunice
2015	Two Wives	Minerva Arguello
2015	Beautiful Strangers	Alejandra Valdez-Castillo
2016	Alyas Robin Hood	Daisylyn "Mama Daisy" Montelibano
2017	Karelasyon: Tukso	Norma
2017	Maalaala Mo Kaya: Jumper	Raquel Pempengco
2017–2018	Super Ma'am	Raquel Honorio-Henerala
2018	The Blood Sisters	Dra. Deborah Marie "Debbie" Bermudez-Almeda
2018–2019	Cain at Abel	Priscilla "Precy" Rodrigo-Larrazabal
2019	Tadhana: Akin ang Anak Ko	Maisa
2020–2021	Anak ni Waray vs. Anak ni Biday	Susanna "Sussie" Agpangan
2021	The World Between Us	Rachel Libradilla
2022	Kalye Kweens	Estella "Telly" Catapang
2023–2024	Abot-Kamay na Pangarap	Giselle Marie Tanyag
2025	My Father's Wife	Vivian de Vera
2026	Love Is Never Gone	Katarina Verona

== Awards and recognitions ==
Year	Category	Work	Award	Result
1986	Best Supporting Actress	Tinik sa Dibdib	FAP Awards	Won
1986	Best Supporting Actress	Tinik sa Dibdib	FAMAS Award	Won
1987	Best Actress	Magdusa Ka	FAP Awards	Won
1987	Best Actress	Magdusa Ka	CMMA	Won
1987	Best Actress	Magdusa Ka	FAMAS Award	Won
1997	Best Celebrity Talk Show Host	Ms. D!	PMPC Star Awards for TV	Won
2001	Best Supporting Actress	Tanging Yaman	Gawad Urian Award	Nominated
2003	Best Actress	American Adobo	Gawad Urian Award	Nominated
2004	Best Actress	Bridal Shower	Gawad Urian Award	Nominated
2008	Best Drama Actress	Babangon Ako't Dudurugin Kita	22nd PMPC Star Awards for TV	Nominated
