= Smith, Bell and Company House =

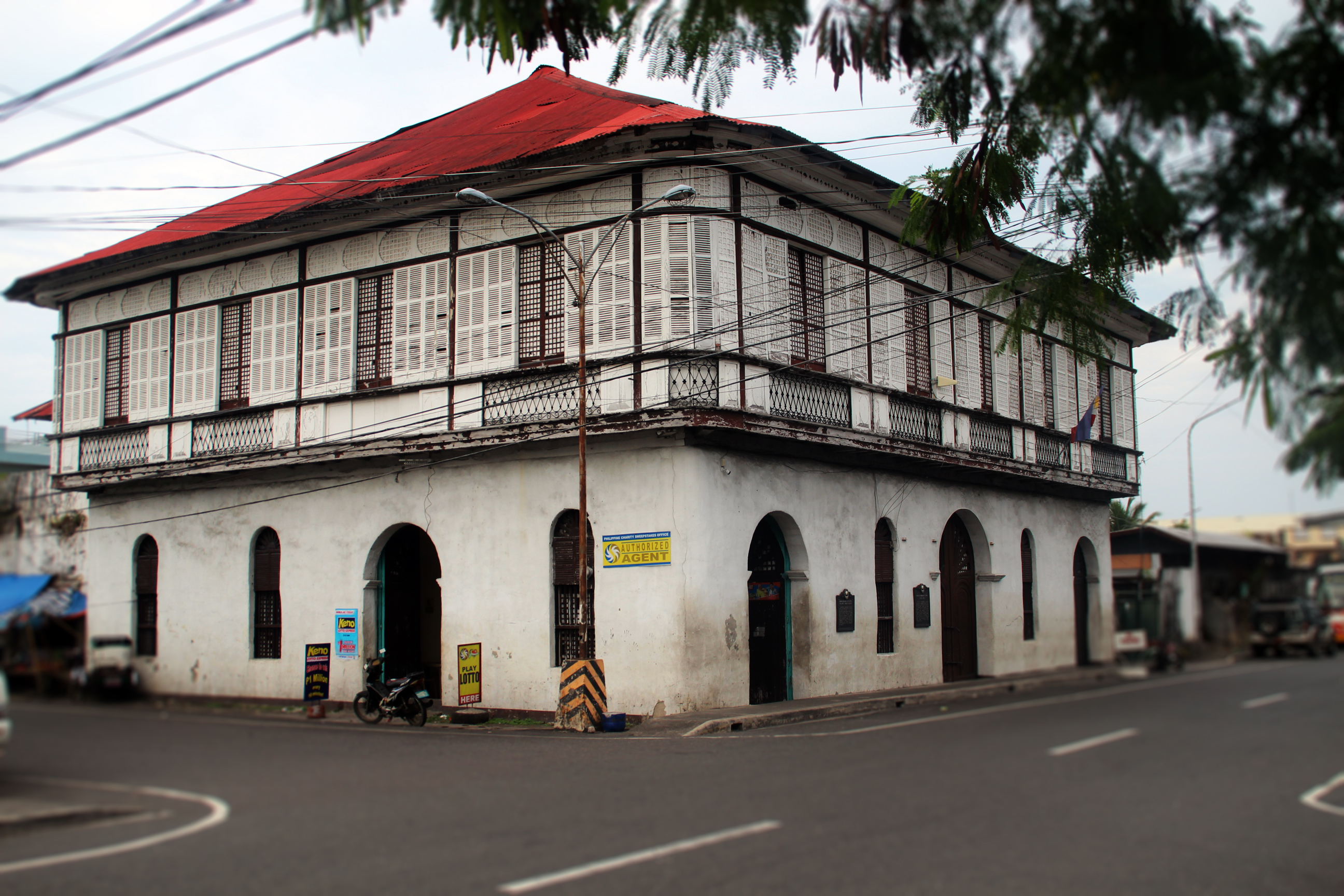
Manalang Gloria Ancestral House

Smith, Bell and Company House (Filipino: Bahay-Kalakal ng Smith, Bell & Co.) or the Angela Manalang Gloria Ancestral House is a Spanish-era structure is in Tabaco, Albay, Philippines. It one of the national cultural heritage of the country, and the biggest ancestral house in the city of Tabaco.

The structure made of stone bonded with mortar and molasses was initially hosted the offices of the Smith, Bell and Company, a trading firm involved in the abaca business which had a history dating back in 1868. In 1965, poet Angela Manalang-Gloria bought the building and made it her residence.
