= St. Agnes Academy (Legazpi City) =

Roman Catholic school in Albay, Philippines

St Agnes Academy
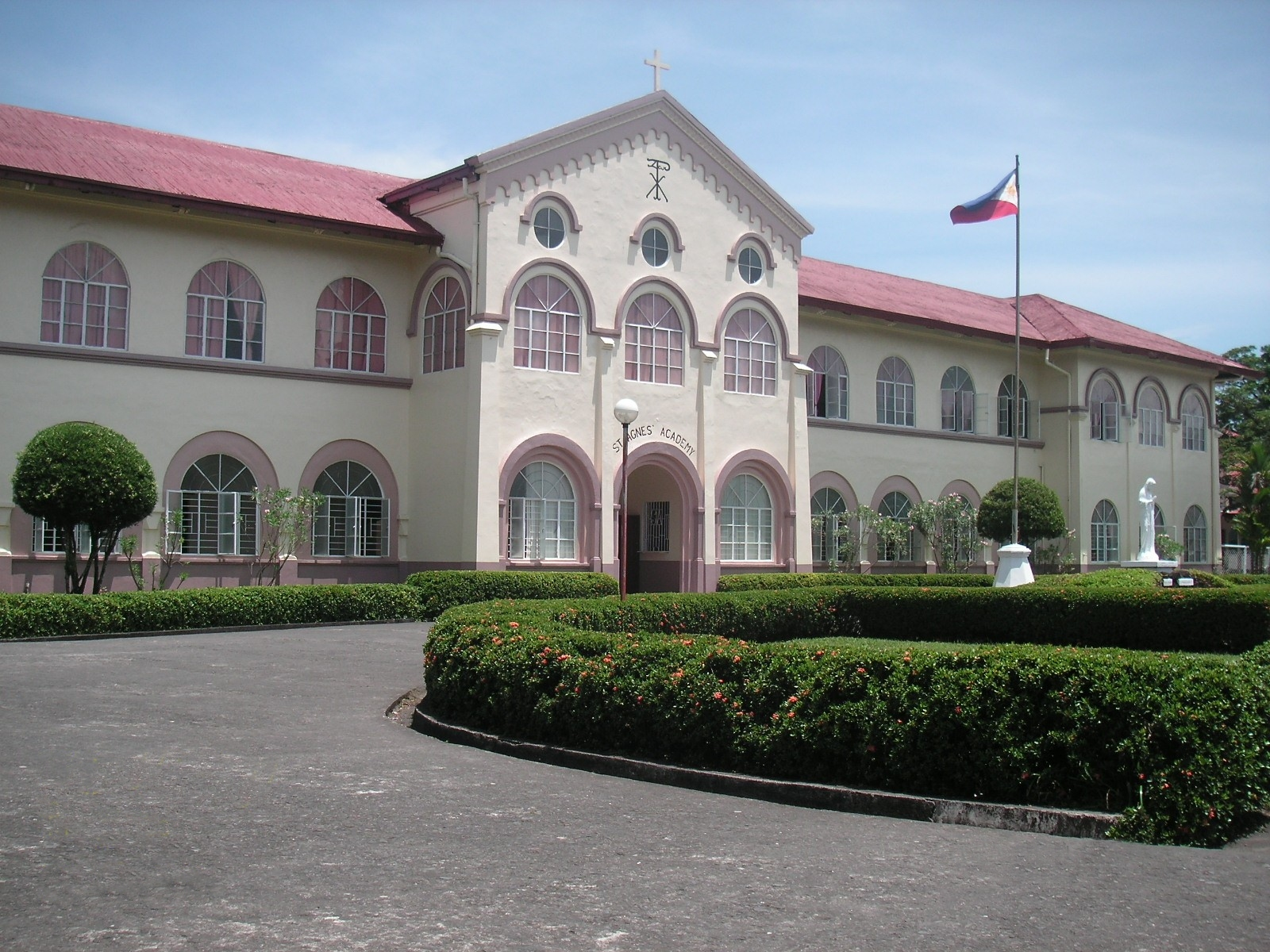

Location
- Legazpi City, Albay; Philippines; 13°08′22″N 123°44′30″E

Information
- Former name: Academia de Sta. Ines (1912-)
- Type: Private Roman Catholic Non-profit Coeducational Basic education institution
- Motto: Latin: Ora et Labora; English: Prayer and Work
- Religious affiliations: Roman Catholic (Missionary Benedictine Sisters of Tutzing)
- Patron saint: Agnes of Rome
- Established: 30 May 1912; 114 years ago
- Sister school: St. Scholastica's College, Manila
- Director: Sr. Lydia Villegas, OSB
- Principal: Arimer E. Valencia
- Faculty: 122
- Grades: Pre-kindergarten to Grade 12
- Enrollment: 2,329
- Campus type: Urban
- Colors: Navy blue and white
- Nickname: Agnesian
- Team name: SAA Lambs
- Accreditation: PAASCU Level III, PEAC Certified
- Publication: The Agnesian
- Website: saa.edu.ph

St. Agnes Academy (Spanish: Academia de Sta. Ines) is a private Catholic basic education institution run by the Congregation of the Missionary Benedictine Sisters of Tutzing in Legazpi, Albay Philippines. It was founded in 1912 and is the oldest Catholic school in the province of Albay, Bicol, Philippines.

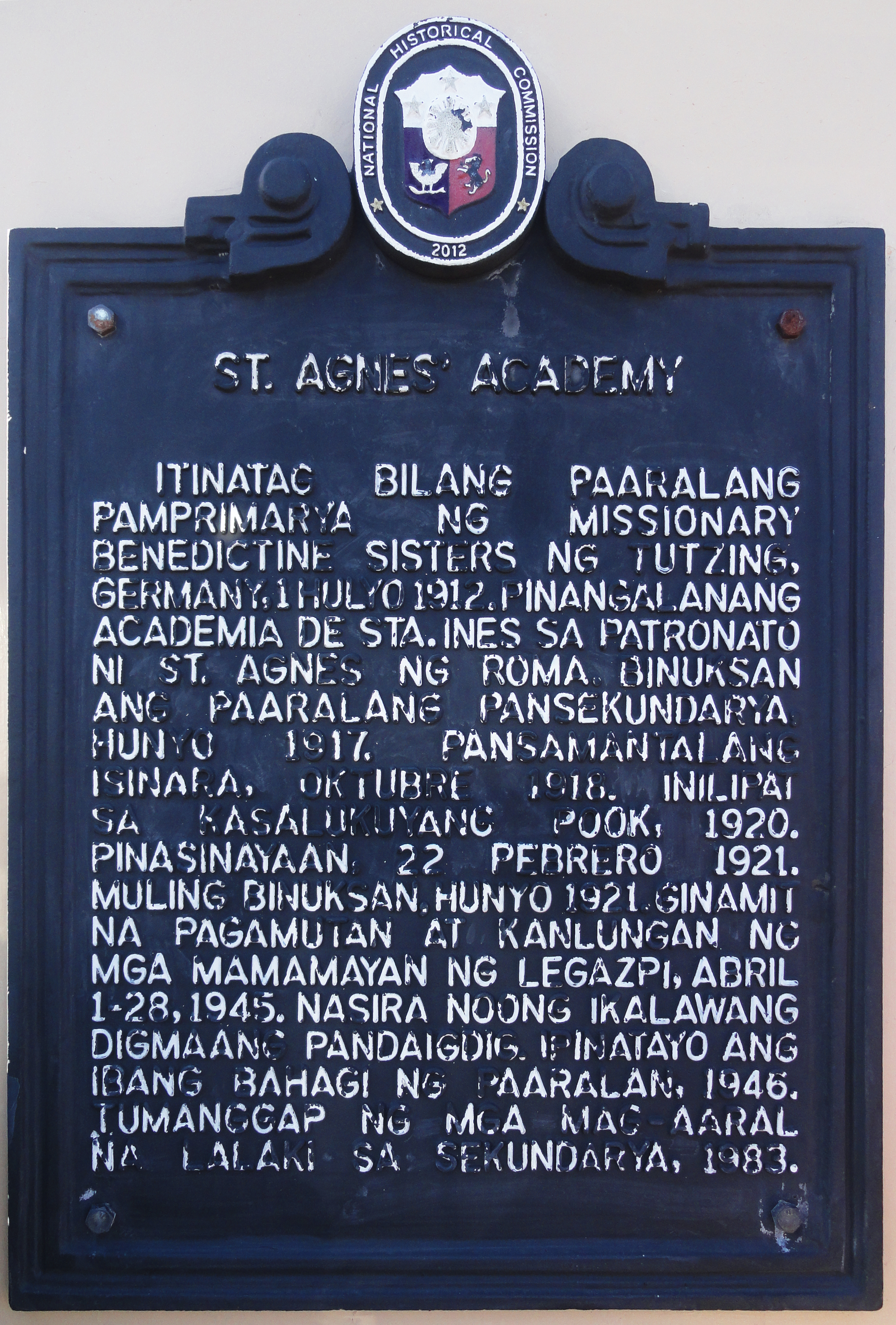
Historical marker installed in 2012

The school provides education for kindergarten, preschool, elementary and high school. The school is a co-educational institution. In its early history, the school was an all-girls school but in the 1980s, its enrolment was opened to male students.

St. Agnes Academy had its centennial celebration in the school year 2012–2013.

St. Agnes Academy's Basic Education program was granted re-accreditation by the Philippine Accrediting Association of Schools Colleges and Universities (PAASCU) until February 2025.

== Notable alumni ==
- Geraldine Schaer Bonnevie, actress
- Angela Manalang-Gloria, poet
- Loida Nicolas Lewis, industrialist
