= Ms. D! =

Philippine television talk show

- Title card
- Genre: Talk show
- Directed by: Mar Matias
- Presented by: Dina Bonnevie
- Country of origin: Philippines
- Original language: Tagalog

Production
- Camera setup: Multiple-camera setup
- Running time: 60 minutes
- Production company: Viva Television

Original release
- Network: GMA Network
- Release: November 11, 1996 – February 26, 1999

Ms. D! is a Philippine television talk show broadcast by GMA Network. Hosted by Dina Bonnevie, it premiered on November 11, 1996. The show concluded on February 26, 1999.
