= Angela Manalang-Gloria =

Filipina writer (1907–1995)

- Born: Angela Marie Legaspi Manalang; August 24, 1907; Guagua, Pampanga, Philippine Islands
- Died: August 19, 1995 (aged 87); Tabaco, Albay, Philippines
- Citizenship: Filipino
- Education: University of the Philippines
- Occupations: Makata, Manunulat (Poet, Writer)
- Spouse: Celedonio Gloria
- Children: 3
- Writing career
- Language: English

Angela Manalang-Gloria (1907–1995) was a Filipina poet who wrote using the English language.

== Early life ==
Angela Marie Legaspi Manalang was born on August 24, 1907, in Guagua, Pampanga with parents, Felipe Dizon Manalang (born in Mexico, Pampanga) and Tomasa Legaspi. However, their family later settled in the Bicol Region, particularly in Tabaco, Albay. She studied at St. Agnes Academy in Legaspi, and graduated valedictorian in elementary. In her senior year, she moved to St. Scholastica's College in Malate, Manila, where her writing journey started to get noticed.

Angela Manalang was among the first generation female students at the University of the Philippines. Angela initially enrolled in law, as suggested by her father. However, with the advice of her professor C.V. Wickers, who also became her mentor, she eventually transferred to literature.

== Writing ==
It was also during her education at the University of the Philippines that she and poet, Jose Garcia Villa developed a lifelong rivalry. Both poets vied for the position of literary editor of The Philippine Collegian, which Manalang eventually held for two successive years. In her junior year, she was quietly engaged to Celedonio Gloria whom she married. She graduated Summa Cum Laude with the Degree of Ph.B. on March 1929.

After graduation, Manalang-Gloria worked briefly for the Philippine Herald Mid-Week Magazine. However, this was cut short when she contracted tuberculosis.

After she was diagnosed, she moved to the cool mountains of Baguio to get better. This quiet time resting inspired her to write some of her best love poems, which were later published in her famous 1940 book, Poems.

=== Achievements ===
Manalang-Gloria is the author of Revolt from Hymen, a poem protesting against marital rape, which caused her denial by an all-male jury from winning the Philippine's Commonwealth Literary Awards in 1940. She was also the author of the poetry collection, Poems, first published in 1940 (and revised in 1950). The collection contained the best of her early work as well as unpublished poems written between 1934 and 1938. Her last poem, Old Maid Walking on a City Street can also be found in the collection. This book was her entry to the Commonwealth Literary Awards, losing to Rafael Zulueta y da Costa's verse Like the Molave.

== Personal life ==
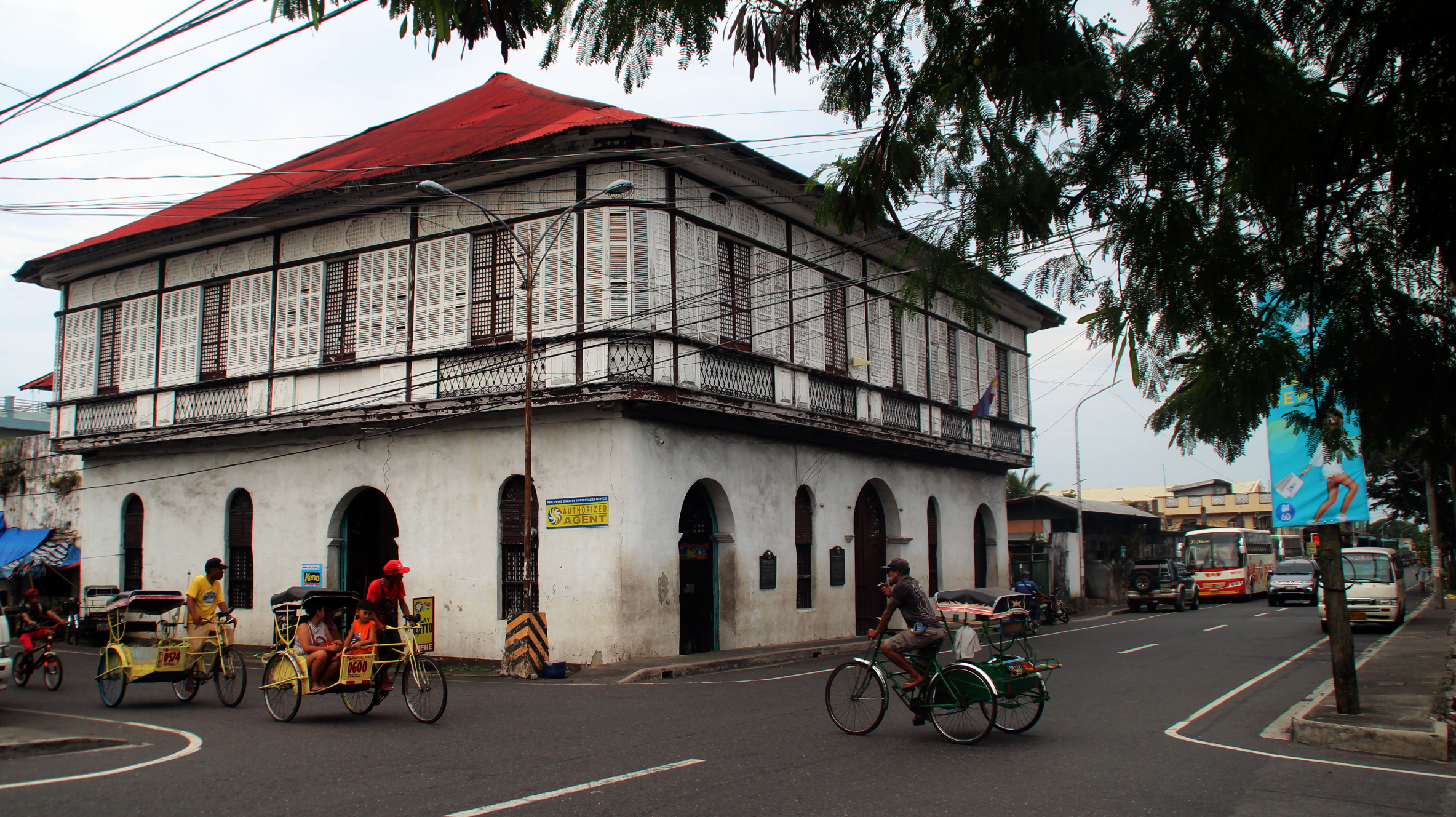
Pedicabs or pedal cabs crossing a street near Manalang Gloria Ancestral House formerly the Smith, Bell and Company House

On March 11, 1945, her husband Celedonio and her son Ruben were attacked by a Japanese patrol in Alitagtag, Batangas. Though her husband died, Ruben was able to survive, yet his trauma had been so severe that he could not bring himself to recount the attack. This event left Manalang-Gloria a young widow with three children to support, which forced her to abandon writing and enter the abaca business, which she successfully managed.

== See also ==
- Maria Rosa Luna Henson
- Ninotchka Rosca
- Paz Márquez-Benítez
