= Hintayan ng Langit =

2018 Philippine drama film

- Official movie poster
- Directed by: Dan Villegas
- Written by: Juan Miguel Severo
- Produced by: Dan Villegas; Antoinette Jadaone; Quark Henares; Manet A. Dayrit; Eduardo Lejano Jr.
- Starring: Eddie Garcia; Gina Pareño
- Cinematography: Nor Domingo; Pao Orendain
- Edited by: Marya Ignacio
- Music by: Len Calvo
- Production companies: Globe Studios; Project 8 Corner San Joaquin Projects
- Distributed by: Globe Studios
- Release date: 22 October 2018
- Running time: 90 minutes
- Country: Philippines
- Languages: Filipino; English

Hintayan ng Langit (English: Heaven's Waiting) is a 2018 Philippine romantic slice-of-life drama film co-produced and directed by Dan Villegas from a screenplay written by Juan Miguel Severo, based on his one-act play of the same name. The film stars the veteran film and television legends, Eddie Garcia and Gina Pareño, as the ex-lovers who are living together in an apartment in Purgatory. It is a co-production between Globe Studios, an entertainment company division of Globe Telecom and Project 8 Corner San Joaquin Projects, with extensive support from the Quezon City Film Development Commission (QCFDC).

The film was released on October 22, 2018, and it received positive reviews, particularly for the performances of the film's leading stars.

== Synopsis ==
Lisang, a woman in her 60s who died from diabetes, has been stuck in Purgatory for two years for consistently making trouble with other souls for fun, but still wants to go to heaven. One day, her room is taken over by a new tenant who turns out to be Manolo, her newly deceased ex-boyfriend. The two gradually reconnect and reveal their respective pain and regrets.

== Cast ==
- Eddie Garcia as Manolo
- Gina Pareño as Lisang
- Joel Saracho as Elias / Tagasuri
- Kat Galang as Bantay
- Mary Joy Apostol as Young Lisang
- Jomari Angeles as Young Manolo
- Geraldine Villamil as Baby
- Dolly de Leon as Mayor Susan
- Francis Mata
- Karl Medina
- Che Ramos
- Mel Kimura

== Production ==
The film was based on the one-act play written by the film's writer, Juan Miguel Severo, that was originally staged for 2015-2016 Virgin Labfest. The roles of Lisang and Manolo were respectively played by Edna Vida and Nonoy Froilan in a 45-minute one-act, single scene play.

=== Casting ===
The film served as a reunion movie of Eddie Garcia and Gina Pareño, who both used to work in Sampaguita Pictures. Director Dan Villegas had long considered working with the two in one film. According to the director, Gina Pareño was previously involved with him prior to the making of the film, while it was his first time working with Garcia. Villegas remarked that he was starstruck with Garcia during their first day, but said that they were very professional and the shooting was peaceful and serene.

== Release ==
The film was first released on October 22, 2018, as one of the entries for the 2018 QCinema International Film Festival. It was also released for nationwide theaters on November 21, 2018.

=== Overseas release ===
Hintayan ng Langit premiered in Italy on April 27, 2019 as one of the featured Filipino films for the 21st Udine Far East Film Festival, along with Chito S. Roño's Signal Rock; Joyce Bernal's Miss Granny, and Mikhail Red's Eerie.

== Critical reception ==
One of ABS-CBN's top couples, Kathryn Bernardo and Daniel Padilla, gave big support for their friend, Juan Miguel Severo, in his first written movie. The writer, a confessed KathNiel fan and previously collaborated on their film The Hows of Us, thanked them for showing up at the premiere. Later, Kathryn Bernardo posted a congratulatory message to Severo's first written film on her Instagram story.

On a review by CNN Philippines, Hintayan ng Langit was praised, particularly for its storyline, setting, film editing, cinematography and the stars' performances. The editing was reviewed positively due to utilizing the detail where it affords to flesh out the dynamics of its world better. The acting performances of Eddie Garcia and Gina Pareño were mixed-to-positive as their performances were viewed as undeniably charming, but the character dynamics of the film were felt imbalanced. In conclusion, it was still a charming piece of work.

=== Accolades ===
At the 2018 QCinema International Film Festival, actor Eddie Garcia and director Dan Villegas won the award for Best Actor and Audience Choice Award, respectively. On August 27, 2019, the film was awarded the Golden Sarmatian Lion Award (President's Prize) from the 12th Orenburg International Film Festival (OIFF, East&West, Classics and Avant Garde) in Orenburg, Russia.

== Spin-off series ==
A spin-off series called Simula sa Gitna (From the Middle) premiered on Amazon Prime Video on November 2, 2023, starring Maris Racal and Khalil Ramos. Among actors retained from the original film were Dolly de Leon and Joel Saracho.
