= Gumapang Ka sa Lusak =

1990 political thriller crime drama film by Lino Brocka

- Official movie poster
- Directed by: Lino Brocka
- Written by: Ricardo Lee
- Produced by: Vic R. del Rosario Jr.; Boy C. De Guia
- Starring: Dina Bonnevie; Christopher de Leon; Eddie Garcia; Charo Santos; Allan Paule
- Cinematography: Pedro Manding Jr.
- Edited by: George Jarlego
- Music by: Nonong Buencamino
- Production company: Viva Films
- Distributed by: Viva Films
- Release date: May 17, 1990
- Running time: 120 minutes
- Country: Philippines
- Language: Filipino

Gumapang Ka sa Lusak (English: You Crawl in the Mud), also known internationally as Dirty Affair, is a 1990 Filipino political thriller crime drama film directed by Lino Brocka from a story and screenplay written by Ricardo Lee. Starring Dina Bonnevie, Eddie Garcia, Charo Santos, Christopher de Leon, and Allan Paule, the film tackles the abuse of power and evil acts committed by Edmundo Guatlo and his cruel wife Rowena in which Rachel, a movie actress who is his mistress, and her friends try to expose his scandals and violent acts done by him and his wife and even his henchmen to the public. This was one of the two films of that year where Brocka collaborated with cinematographer Pedro Manding Jr. before the latter's murder; the other is Biktima.

Produced and distributed by Viva Films, the film was theatrically released on May 17, 1990, and was later screened through international film festivals including in France and Japan in 1994. In 2010, the film was remade into a television drama series of the same name by GMA Network as the nineteenth installment of Sine Novela and starred Dennis Trillo as Levi, Jennylyn Mercado as Rachel, Al Tantay as Edmundo Guatlo, and Sandy Andolong as Rowena Guatlo.

== Plot ==
Living in the slums of Manila, Jonathan, a college student, enjoys spending time with his wealthy college friends, Eric, Dodo, and RJ. One night at a bar, he meets Rachel, a former sexy star who is having an affair with Mayor Edmundo Guatlo, who is running for Congress and is being financially supported by the mayor, at the cost of being constantly followed by Edmundo's aide, Falcon. Jonathan sees Rachel again at the bar, but when Falcon and his men force her to come with them, Jonathan helps her escape. Rachel visits her family, but her younger sister, Gigi, is embarrassed by her affair with Edmundo. She also visits her former boyfriend, Levi, who was imprisoned for robbery, in jail. She asks Edmundo to use his connections to secure Levi's release. On the way to a party, Edmundo is followed by his wife, Rowena, who asks him to switch to her car. At the party, Rachel comes and surprises Rowena.

Rowena visits Rachel and offers money, but asks her to leave the house she got from Edmundo. Rachel insists that Edmundo is the one who will decide for her. Rowena threatens her that if she does not obey, she will pour acid on her face and she will have her raped. Then Rachel's father was fired from his job and blamed Rowena after she spoke to his employer. Edmundo tells Rachel that Levi is about to be released from prison. Upon Levi's release, Falcon told him that Edmundo helped him, but asked him to kill Edmundo's political rival, Atty. Ricardo Tuazon. When Rachel visits Levi, he reveals Edmundo's instructions, promising that they will start all over after the deed. Levi complies and kills Tuazon during a beauty pageant while being interviewed as one of the judges. But Edmundo betrays him and orders his men to hunt him down. Levi sought refuge in Rachel's family's house. But her father does not want to get involved with Levi. Jonathan also comes to help, but Rachel refuses, not wanting him to get involved. Falcon and his men arrive and kill Levi in front of Rachel and Jonathan, both of whom escape.

Rowena harshly reprimands Falcon for not killing Rachel, but is then told that Edmundo ordered them not to kill her. Rowena warns that Rachel might go to Tuazon's camp and expose everything. Rachel seeks the help of Jonathan and his friends. Dodo offers her a place to stay at her cousin's. As Eric, Dodo, and RJ are on the road, they are accosted by Falcon and his men. Falcon asked RJ where they had brought Rachel. RJ fights back and is shot dead by Falcon. Falcon tells the others that he has abducted Rachel's parents and tells them to contact him if Rachel wants to see them. She then calls Edmundo, who admits that he was the one who ordered the abduction of her parents to make sure that she would contact her. He then tells her that he still loves her. Rachel then plays a tape-recorded confession of her saying it was Edmundo who ordered the murders of both Levi and Atty. Tuazon. She also reveals that when she was still an actress, she was abducted by Edmundo's men and taken to a resort where Edmundo raped her. Edmundo offered her financial support for her and her family. He also threatens her, saying that if she disobeys him, he will ruin her face, forcing her to leave her acting career and become Edmundo's mistress. Rachel tells him she would make several copies and circulate them to the national media. However, she says she would give the tape to Edmundo in exchange for her parents' freedom just before Rachel arrives, where her parents, Falcon, arrive first. She asks where Edmundo is, but Falcon says he is not around. She is reunited with her parents and warns Falcon that she has friends who can help her expose his evil deeds. Falcon threatens them and shoots Rachel's mother after she slapped him. Falcon is held back by Rachel's father, who allows his daughter, Rachel, to escape, and the latter met his brutal demise.

During an event, Levi's mother stabbed Rowena to avenge her son before being shot and killed. While Edmundo gives a speech at a rally, Rachel comes and tells everyone about his role in the assassinations of both Levi and Atty. Tuazon, in which she exposes the atrocities committed by him and his wife. As Edmundo denies the accusations, Rachel's recorded confession is played. A furious Falcon mortally shoots Rachel, causing the people to panic, and he is shot to death while trying to evade. Rachel thanks Jonathan before she died in his arms, as Edmundo and Rowena are arrested. The next day, a mournful Jonathan looks at the sunset and reminisces about his time with Rachel, including her advice to start a new, cleaner life.

== Cast ==
- Dina Bonnevie as Rachel Suarez: A former movie actress who is Edmundo's mistress and wants to expose his evil acts to the public.
- Christopher De Leon as Levi: Rachel's boyfriend, whom Edmundo tasked to assassinate his political rival.
- Eddie Garcia as Edmundo Guatlo: A demon-minded mayor who is running for congressman and has an affair with Rachel.
- Charo Santos as Rowena Guatlo: Edmundo's wife.
- Bembol Roco as Falcon: Edmundo's henchman, who usually watches Rachel's actions.
- Allan Paule as Jonathan: A young college student who is a fan of Rachel Suarez and one of the driving forces to expose Mayor Guatlo's evil and scandalous acts to the public.
- Francis Magalona as RJ: One of Jonathan's friends, but kidnapped and killed by Falcon.
- William Lorenzo as Eric: One of Jonathan's friends.
- Timothy Diwa as Dodo: One of Jonathan's friends.
- Perla Bautista as Rachel's mother.
- Anita Linda as Levi's mother
- Maureen Mauricio as a movie actress on a film set
- Ernie Zarate as Rachel's father
- Lucita Soriano as Jonathan's mother
- Ray Ventura as Atty. Ricardo Tuazon: Edmundo's political rival, whom Edmundo wanted to kill.
- Archie Adamos as Rowena Guatlo's bodyguard

== Production ==
In September 1989, after the success of Babangon Ako't Dudurugin Kita, Hilda Koronel was originally set to play Rachel Suarez, and Phillip Salvador was also cast for a special appearance. However, in February 1990, she left the project after filing a breach-of-contract suit against the film studio.

== Release ==
The film was theatrically released on May 17, 1990. It received a terrestrial television premiere on ABS-CBN in April 1992, as the network's tribute to the director.

== Reception ==
=== Accolades ===
Accolades received by Gumapang Ka sa Lusak
Year	Award	Category	Recipient(s)	Result	Ref.
1991	FAMAS Awards	Best Picture	Gumapang Ka sa Lusak	Nominated	
1991	FAMAS Awards	Best Director	Lino Brocka	Won	
1991	FAMAS Awards	Best Story	Ricky Lee	Won	
1991	FAMAS Awards	Best Actress	Dina Bonnevie	Nominated	
1991	FAMAS Awards	Best Supporting Actress	Charo Santos	Nominated	
1991	Gawad Urian Awards	Best Film	Gumapang Ka sa Lusak	Won	
1991	Gawad Urian Awards	Best Screenplay	Ricky Lee	Won	
1991	Gawad Urian Awards	Best Actress	Dina Bonnevie	Nominated	
1991	Gawad Urian Awards	Best Supporting Actress	Charo Santos	Nominated	
1991	Gawad Urian Awards	Best Supporting Actor	Eddie Garcia	Nominated	
1991	FAP Awards	Best Picture	Gumapang Ka sa Lusak	Won	
1991	FAP Awards	Best Director	Lino Brocka	Won	
1991	FAP Awards	Best Actor	Eddie Garcia	Nominated	
1991	FAP Awards	Best Supporting Actor	Bembol Roco	Nominated	
1991	FAP Awards	Best Supporting Actress	Charo Santos	Nominated	
1991	FAP Awards	Best Musical Score	Nonong Buencamino	Nominated	
1991	Catholic Mass Media Awards (CMMA)	Best Picture	Gumapang Ka sa Lusak	Won	
1991	Catholic Mass Media Awards (CMMA)	Best Actress	Dina Bonnevie	Nominated	
1991	Catholic Mass Media Awards (CMMA)	Best Supporting Actress	Charo Santos	Nominated	
1991	Catholic Mass Media Awards (CMMA)	Best Supporting Actor	Christopher de Leon	Nominated	
1991	Star Awards	Best Director	Lino Brocka	Won	
1991	Star Awards	Best Actor	Eddie Garcia	Nominated	
1991	Star Awards	Best Actress	Dina Bonnevie	Nominated	
1991	Star Awards	Best Supporting Actor	Christopher de Leon	Won	
1991	Star Awards	Best Supporting Actress	Charo Santos	Nominated	
1991	Star Awards	Best Editor	George Jarlego	Won	
1991	Star Awards	Best Music	Dionisio "Nonong" Buencamino	Nominated	
1991	Star Awards	Best Movie Theme	Dionisio "Nonong" Buencamino	Nominated	
1991	Star Awards	Best Sound	Rolly Ruta	Won	
1991	Star Awards	Best Production Design	Benjie de Guzman	Nominated	
