= Narito ang Puso Ko (TV series) =

Philippine television drama series

- Title card
- Also known as: Here is My Heart
- Genre: Romantic drama
- Developed by: R.J. Nuevas
- Directed by: Enrico Quizon; Gina Alajar; Joel Lamangan
- Creative director: Jun Lana
- Starring: Jolina Magdangal; Raymart Santiago; James Blanco
- Theme music composer: Maya Meriales Manzanas; Gary Valenciano
- Opening theme: "Narito" by Jolina Magdangal
- Country of origin: Philippines
- Original language: Tagalog
- No. of episodes: 175

Production
- Executive producer: Angie Castrense
- Producer: Wilma Galvante
- Production locations: Manila, Philippines; Pampanga, Philippines
- Cinematography: Monino Duque
- Camera setup: Multiple-camera setup
- Running time: 30 minutes
- Production company: GMA Entertainment TV

Original release
- Network: GMA Network
- Release: June 9, 2003 – March 5, 2004

Narito ang Puso Ko (trans. / international title: Here is My Heart) is a Philippine television drama romance series broadcast by GMA Network. Directed by Enrico Quizon and Gina Alajar, it stars Jolina Magdangal, Raymart Santiago and James Blanco. It premiered on June 9, 2003 on the network's Telebabad line up. The series concluded on March 5, 2004, with a total of 175 episodes.

The series is streaming online on YouTube.

== Cast and characters ==
Cast

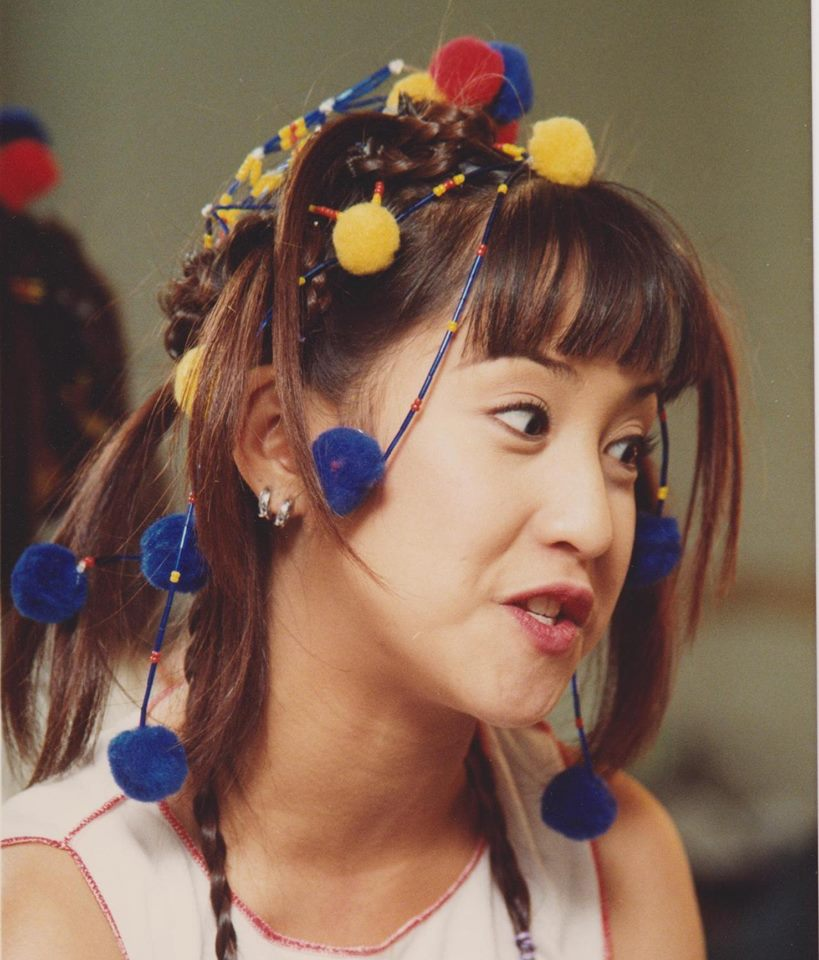
Jolina Magdangal

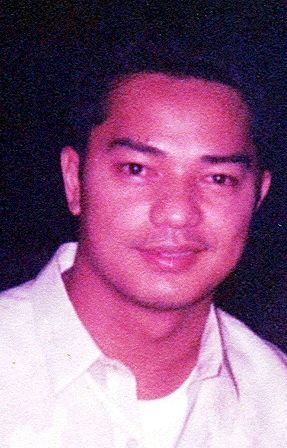
Ariel Rivera

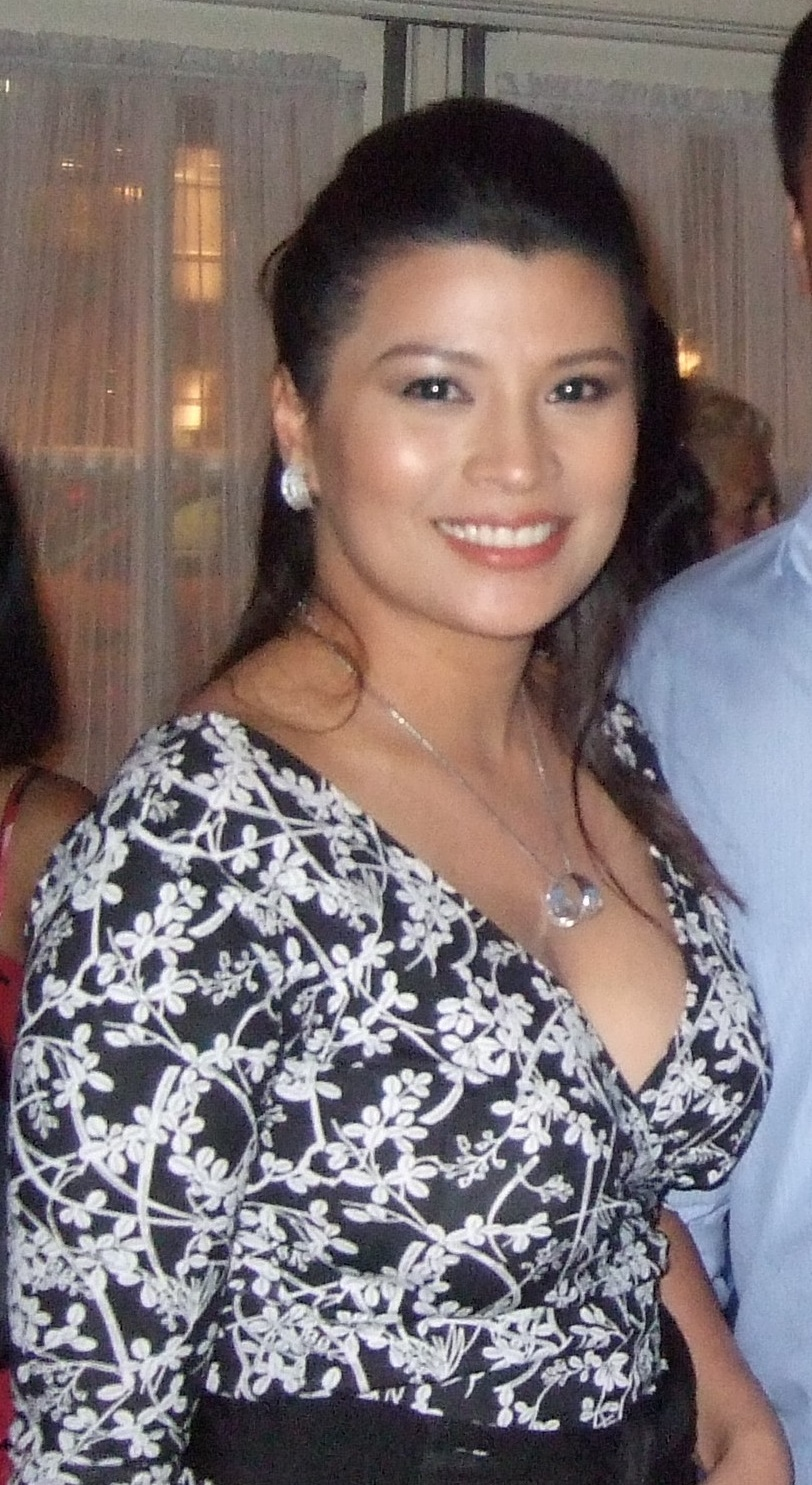
Mylene Dizon

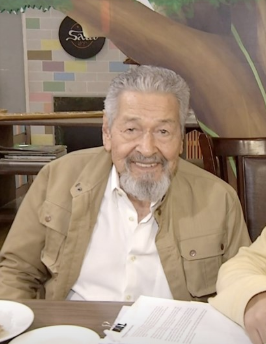
Eddie Garcia

Lead cast

- Jolina Magdangal as Antonina San Victores / Isabella Campuspos
- Raymart Santiago as Rodolfo Perez
- James Blanco as Santiago "Santi" Tatlonghari

Supporting cast

- Rosa Rosal as Dolores San Victores
- Eddie Garcia as Felipe San Victores
- Amy Austria as Elsa Campuspos
- Dina Bonnevie as Violeta San Victores
- Raymond Bagatsing as Joaquin San Victores
- Ariel Rivera as Amoroso San Victores
- Carmina Villarroel as Ava "Primavera" Grande
- Lilia Dizon as Leticia
- Karen delos Reyes as fake Antonina / Luzviminda Bautista
- Chanda Romero as Clara Bautista
- Mylene Dizon as Stella Bautista
- Benjie Paras as Boyong

Recurring cast

- Monsour del Rosario as Ernesto San Vicente
- Allan Paule as Allan
- Ricci Chan as Red
- Lara Melissa de Leon as Arlene
- Raven Villanueva as Janessa

Guest cast

- Princess Punzalan as Salgado
- Sharmaine Arnaiz as younger Dolores
- Lander Vera Perez as Antonio San Victores
- Jay R as Jay R
- Kyla as Melani
- Jim Pebanco as Edgar
- Malou de Guzman as Rodolfo's mother
- Phoemela Baranda as Esmeralda San Victores
- Ernie Zarate as Enrico
- Reggie Curly as a private investigator
- Arlene Tolibas as a floor manager
- Mel Kimura as Melani's assistant
- Czarina Lopez de Leon as Jonathan's ex-girlfriend

== Accolades ==
Accolades received by Narito ang Puso Ko
Year	Award	Category	Recipient	Result	Ref.
2004	Golden Screen TV Awards	Most Outstanding Supporting Actor	Raymond Bagatsing	Won	
