= Bwakaw =

2012 comedy drama film by Jun Robles Lana

- Theatrical release poster
- Directed by: Jun Robles Lana
- Written by: Jun Robles Lana
- Produced by: Jun Robles Lana; Ramel David; Perci Intalan; Jojo Oconer; Michael Tuviera
- Starring: Eddie Garcia; Princess the Dog
- Cinematography: Carlo Mendoza
- Edited by: Lawrence S. Ang
- Music by: Jema Pamintuan; Jeff Hernandez
- Production companies: Cinemalaya; Octobertrain Films; APT Entertainment
- Distributed by: ABS-CBN Film Productions (Philippines) (Note: Distributed under the joint label, Star Cinema/ABS-CBN Film Productions.); Fortissimo Films (Worldwide)
- Release dates: July 21, 2012 (8th Cinemalaya Independent Film Festival); September 5, 2012 (Philippines)
- Running time: 110 minutes
- Country: Philippines
- Language: Filipino

Bwakaw is a 2012 Philippine comedy-drama film written, co-produced, and directed by Jun Robles Lana. Eddie Garcia stars as a lonely gay man in his seventies who cares for a stray dog he named Bwakaw, played by Princess the Dog. Supporting cast includes Rez Cortez, Bibeth Orteza, Armida Siguion-Reyna, Soliman Cruz, Soxie Topacio, Allan Paule, and Gardo Versoza.

A co-production of Cinemalaya, Octobertrain Films, and APT Entertainment and distributed by Star Cinema, the film was first screened in the Philippines on July 21, 2012, as one of the official entries for the Director's Showcase category at the 8th Cinemalaya Independent Film Festival. Bwakaw was later screened in various international film festivals including at the 25th Tokyo International Film Festival in Japan, where it won "Special Mention" award.

The film was selected as the Philippine entry for the Best Foreign Language Film at the 85th Academy Awards, but it did not make the final shortlist.

== Plot ==
Rene is a gay man who came out of the closet at the age of 60. Ailing in his twilight years, he thinks it is now too late for love, even companionship, and that all there is to look forward to is Death. He has made a will, bequeathing his few possessions to his even fewer friends. Everything is packed and labeled, ready for distribution. He has even paid for a coffin, taking advantage of a funeral home's Summer Sale. Nowadays, the only companion Rene has is Bwakaw, a stray dog that hangs around his house and follows him wherever he goes.

As Rene waits for the day of his death, he gets the surprise of his life when it is Bwakaw who suddenly falls ill and is diagnosed with cancer. Rene is surprisingly affected, and he realizes that he values Bwakaw more than he thinks. In his struggle to get Bwakaw cured, Rene finds comfort in the most unlikely person: Sol, a tricycle driver who helps him bring Bwakaw to the vet and befriends him. Buoyed by Sol's friendship, Rene starts living. Little by little, he discovers simple joys. To the surprise of his friends, he even has his hair dyed to look younger. One day, he finally decides to make a move on Sol. The revelation that Rene is gay and has feelings for him surprises and disgusts Sol. He rejects Rene and leaves in anger.

In the meantime, Bwakaw's condition gets worse. Not even Rene's ancient Santo Entierro (a supposedly miraculous statue of Jesus Christ) can save Bwakaw. Bwakaw dies, and Rene's friends help him bury the faithful dog. But Bwakaw's death, even while it was still only imminent, has made a difference. Rene has found a new appreciation for life and what is most important. He decides to unpack the things that he has already willed to other people and make his house more habitable.

== Cast ==
- Eddie Garcia as Rene
- Princess as Bwakaw
- Rez Cortez as Sol
- Soliman Cruz as Funeral Homes Manager
- Bibeth Orteza as Rose
- Joey Paras as Tracy
- Allan Paule as Berting
- Beverly Salviejo as Nitang
- Soxie Topacio as Zaldy
- Luz Valdez as Minda
- Gardo Versoza as Father Eddie
- Armida Siguion-Reyna as Alicia
- Jonathan Neri as Veterinarian 1
- Roni Bertubin as Ronaldo Bertubin (Minda's Nephew)
- May-i Fabros as Cedes

== Reception ==
=== Accolades ===
Bwakaw won the Netpac Awards and the Audience Choice during the Cinemalaya competition, while Garcia was awarded Best Actor.

| Event | Award | Category/Recipient(s) | Result | Reference |
|---|---|---|---|---|
| Cinemalaya Independent Film Festival | Audience Award | Directors Showcase (Jun Lana) | Won | |
| Cinemalaya Independent Film Festival | Balanghai Trophy | Best Actor - Directors Showcase (Eddie Garcia) | Won | |
| Cinemalaya Independent Film Festival | NETPAC Award | Directors Showcase (Jun Lana) | Won | |
| Cinemalaya Independent Film Festival | Balanghai Trophy | Best Film - Directors Showcase (Jun Lana) | Nominated | |
| Hawaii International Film Festival | Halekulani Golden Orchid Award | Narrative Feature (Jun Lana) | Nominated | |
| Tokyo International Film Festival | Asian Film Award - Special Mention | Jun Lana | Won | |
| 85th Academy Awards | Best Foreign Language Film | Philippine Entry | Not nominated | |
| 55th Asia Pacific Film Festival | Best Actor | Eddie Garcia | Won | |
| 7th Asian Film Awards | Best Actor | Eddie Garcia | Won | |
| 7th Asian Film Awards | People's Choice Award for Best Actor | Eddie Garcia | Won | |
