= Bakit May Kahapon Pa? =

1996 suspense thriller drama film by Joel C. Lamangan

- Home video cover of the film
- Directed by: Joel Lamangan
- Screenplay by: Roy Iglesias; Julius Alfonso
- Produced by: Vic R. Del Rosario Jr.; William C. Leary; Regina Dee
- Starring: Nora Aunor; Eddie Garcia; Dawn Zulueta
- Cinematography: Romeo Vitug
- Edited by: Jess Navarro
- Music by: Jessie Lasaten
- Production companies: Viva Films; IAM Productions
- Distributed by: Viva Films
- Release date: September 18, 1996 (Philippines)
- Running time: 109 minutes
- Country: Philippines
- Language: Filipino

Bakit May Kahapon Pa? (Why Is There a Yesterday?) is a 1996 Filipino suspense thriller drama film directed by Joel Lamangan from a screenplay written by Roy C. Iglesias and Julius Alfonso. Starring Nora Aunor, Eddie Garcia, and Dawn Zulueta, the film follows a rogue New People's Army assassin, who takes revenge on an army general for ordering the massacre of her village.

Produced by Viva Films and IAM Film Productions, the film was theatrically released on September 18, 1996, and gave Aunor her second international acting award from 1st East Asia Film and Television Awards in Malaysia.

== Plot ==
In October 1971, the inhabitants of San Marco in Laguna were massacred by soldiers led by Colonel Valderama for allegedly sympathizing with communists. The only survivor is a little girl, Helen Morda, who is taken into the care of the Catholic Church but develops a hatred of the military as well as religion-induced delusions of revenge. Years later, she joins a New People's Army hit squad but suffers from flashbacks caused by post-traumatic stress disorder and goes rogue, killing relatives of Valderama, now a decorated General, in separate ambushes. The death of Valderama's son Mario leads to his return from Washington DC, where he serves as military attaché, to attend the funeral, unaware that this is part of Helen's plan to lure and kill him.

Posing as a real estate agent, Helen rents a guesthouse in the Valderama residence under the name Karina Salvacion, while discreetly gathering explosives and other materials for her plan. The general is wary of her while his daughter, Lea, harbors ambiguous feelings for her tenant. On the other hand, Helen/Karina bonds with Lea's daughter, Mumay, whom she seeks to protect from the repercussions of her plan and warns her of monsters lurking around. Lea, while making a documentary tribute for her father, learns from multiple sources that he was involved in several human rights abuses, including the massacre in San Marco. She confronts her father, but is appalled at how he justifies his actions as part of his patriotic duties.

While Lea is away, Helen cuts off the Valderama residence's power supply, drugs the housekeep and security guards, and expels the remaining staff at gunpoint before sealing off the house and setting up explosives inside. She then wakes a sleeping Valderama by shooting him in his sleep, injuring him. She confronts him for his role in the massacre, but Valderama shows no remorse. While arguing, Helen is distracted by Mumay, who is awakened by the outage and disoriented. While Helen tells Mumay to hide, claiming that there are monsters in the house, Valderama escapes and gets into a shootout with Helen.

As the siege unfolds, Lea arrives and is told by a policeman tells him of Karina's real identity. She enters the house and pleads with Helen, but is angered when Helen admits to killing Mario. The two struggle for Helen's gun, but Helen manages to shoot Lea in the arm, forcing her to flee. Helen is then shot by a police sniper in front of Mumay. Helen comforts a distraught Mumay and releases her. Valderma mortally shoots Helen as she prepares the explosive charges, dying contentedly as Valderama approaches, but the latter fails to stop the explosion, which consumes the house and kills him.

== Cast ==
- Nora Aunor as Helen Morda / Karina Salvacion
  - Sarah Jane Abad as Young Helen
- Eddie Garcia as Gen. Ernesto Valderama, a Philippine Army general who served as a military attache overseas and the father of Mario and Lea
- Dawn Zulueta as Leandra "Lea" Valderama, Gen. Valderama's daughter and Mumay's mother
- Melisse Santiago as Mumay, Lea's daughter and Gen. Valderama's granddaughter
- Rolando Tinio as Priest
- Daniel Fernando as Mulong
- Tony Mabesa as Colonel Baluyot
- Irma Adlawan as Karina's Mother
- Jim Pebanco as Karina's Father
- Madeleine Nicolas as Nun (Note: Credited as Mads Nicolas)
- Ernie Zarate as Colonel
- Ray Ventura as Col. Madrigal
- Ama Quiambao as Col. Madrigal's sister
- Angel Baldomar as Lt. Mario Valderama, Lea's brother
- Elmer Jamias as Major Victa
- Julie Fe Navarro as Reporter
- Raul Dimaano as Bodyguard

== Production ==
Principal photography for Bakit May Kahapon Pa? was completed on July 17, 1996.

== Reception ==
=== Critical reception ===
Isah V. Red, writing for Manila Standard, stated that the film is described as the "most significant Filipino film" to be shown for the year 1996. Besides giving praise to the acting performances of Aunor, Garcia, and Zulueta, he gave praise to its screenplay for its use of "unorthodox narratives" while featuring a "daring subject".

=== Accolades ===
Year	Group	Category	Nominee	Result
1996	1st East Asia Film and Television Award (Malaysia)	Best Actress	Nora Aunor	Won
1997	Cairo International Film Festival	Golden Pyramid	Bakit May Kahapon Pa?	Nominated
1997	Filipino Academy of Movie Arts and Sciences Awards (FAMAS)	Best Actor	Eddie Garcia	Won
1997	Filipino Academy of Movie Arts and Sciences Awards (FAMAS)	Best Supporting Actress	Dawn Zulueta	Won
1997	Filipino Academy of Movie Arts and Sciences Awards (FAMAS)	Best Story	Roy C. Iglesias	Won
1997	Filipino Academy of Movie Arts and Sciences Awards (FAMAS)	Best Screenplay	Roy C. Iglesias; Julius Alfonso	Won
1997	Gawad Urian Awards (Manunuri ng Pelikulang Pilipino)	Best Actress	Nora Aunor	Won
1997	Gawad Urian Awards (Manunuri ng Pelikulang Pilipino)	Best Cinematography	Romeo Vitug	Won
1997	Gawad Urian Awards (Manunuri ng Pelikulang Pilipino)	Best Picture	Bakit May Kahapon Pa?	Nominated
1997	Gawad Urian Awards (Manunuri ng Pelikulang Pilipino)	Best Director	Joel Lamangan	Nominated
1997	Gawad Urian Awards (Manunuri ng Pelikulang Pilipino)	Best Actor	Eddie Garcia	Nominated
1997	Gawad Urian Awards (Manunuri ng Pelikulang Pilipino)	Best Supporting Actress	Dawn Zulueta	Nominated
1997	Gawad Urian Awards (Manunuri ng Pelikulang Pilipino)	Best Screenplay	Roy C. Iglesias; Julius Alfonso	Nominated
1997	Gawad Urian Awards (Manunuri ng Pelikulang Pilipino)	Best Sound	Ramon Reyes	Nominated
1997	Gawad Urian Awards (Manunuri ng Pelikulang Pilipino)	Best Editing	Jess Navarro	Nominated
1997	Luna Awards (Film Academy of the Philippines)	Best Picture	Bakit May Kahapon Pa?	Nominated
1997	Star Awards for Movies (Philippine Movie Press Club)	Best Picture	Bakit May Kahapon Pa?	Nominated
1997	Star Awards for Movies (Philippine Movie Press Club)	Best Actress	Nora Aunor	Nominated
1997	Star Awards for Movies (Philippine Movie Press Club)	Best Actor	Eddie Garcia	Nominated
1997	Star Awards for Movies (Philippine Movie Press Club)	Best Supporting Actress	Melisse Santiago	Nominated
1997	Star Awards for Movies (Philippine Movie Press Club)	Best Director	Joel Lamangan	Nominated
1997	Star Awards for Movies (Philippine Movie Press Club)	Best Screenplay	Roy C. Iglesias; Julius Alfonso	Nominated
1997	Star Awards for Movies (Philippine Movie Press Club)	Best in Sound	Ramon Reyes	Nominated
1997	Star Awards for Movies (Philippine Movie Press Club)	Best in Editing	Jess Navarro	Nominated
1997	Young Critics Circle	Best Performance by Male or Female, Adult or Child, Individual or Ensemble in Leading or Supporting Role	Nora Aunor	Nominated

== List of film festivals competed or exhibited ==
- 1997 - 1st East Asian Film and TV Festival Penang, Malaysia, Aug. 28 – Sept. 3. (Competition Film)
  - Winner, Golden Pearl Award for Best Actress (Nora Aunor)*
- 1997 - Fukuoka International Film Festival, Feature Film: Excellent Films of Asia, September 12–21
- 1997 - Cairo International Film Festival, Cairo, Egypt, Competition Film, December 1–15
- 1995 - 2nd Asian Film Festival, Tokyo, Japan,
- 1998 - International Film Festival of India, New Delhi, India, Competition Film, January 10–20
- 1998 - Brussels International Independent Film Festival, Competition Film
