= Abakada... Ina =

2001 Filipino drama film by Eddie Garcia

- Official movie poster
- Directed by: Eddie Garcia
- Written by: Shaira Mella Salvador; Ramon Bayron
- Produced by: Vic R. del Rosario Jr.
- Starring: Lorna Tolentino; Albert Martinez; Nida Blanca
- Cinematography: Romulo Araojo
- Edited by: Ike Jarlego, Jr.
- Music by: Jimmy Fabregas
- Production company: Viva Films
- Distributed by: Viva Films
- Release date: April 14, 2001
- Running time: 108 minutes
- Country: Philippines
- Language: Filipino

Abakada... Ina (lit. '"ABCD… Mother"') is a 2001 Filipino drama movie, directed by Eddie Garcia and written by Shaira Mella Salvador, starring Lorna Tolentino, Albert Martinez, and Nida Blanca.

This is Garcia's return on his directorial career after eight years. Also, it was Martinez' first drama film.

== Plot ==
In the rural town of Pasong Camachile, a girl named Estella decides to quit school after her slipper breaks and her notebook falls into a river on her way to school. Her mother Miling does not act, being too busy attending to her sick husband.

Years later, Estella, who grows up illiterate, is married to Daniel, the mother of schoolteacher Matilda. The couple have three daughters, Gina, Beth, and Joan. Estella and her daughters live in Matilda’s house, where the latter looks down on her daughter-in-law for being uneducated and interferes excessively in her granddaughters’ lives. Meanwhile, Daniel, who wants to become an aeronautical engineer, is being forced by his mother to become a sailor just like his late father, despite failing the relevant exams five times.

One day, Daniel arrives home after resigning from his job as a ship mechanic. He promises to Estella that they live separately from Matilda and set up a business together, but Matilda intervenes and forces Daniel to take the sailors’ exams another time, and raises funds for bribes just in case. In frustration, Daniel’s younger brother Jojo, who Matilda forces to quit from school as a result, warns his mother of the consequences of her domineering ways and leaves her house for good. An angry Estella forces Daniel to take her and their children to Manila in exchange for him reneging on his promise.

In Manila, the family experiences multiple setbacks. Estella struggles to manage their rented household and make a living as a food vendor. Beth and Grace narrowly escape being raped by their new classmates in high school. Joan suffers a fever that worsens when Estella gives her the wrong medicine due to her inability to read the labels. Estella is in turn berated by Daniel for what happened. On the day of the sailors’ exam, Daniel is caught cheating and expelled, whereupon he and his family move back to Pasong Camachile.

Estella becomes tired of being constantly mistreated by Daniel and Matilda and resolves to move out with her children, but she is stopped by Daniel and Matilda and is forced to leave alone. She moves back to her mother’s house, where she expresses regret that she did not finish her education. Miling also apologizes for not having forced her to continue studying. Meanwhile, Daniel and Matilda struggle to manage the children in Estella’s absence, with Joan running away to Estella’s place. Jojo, now a successful businessman, urges Daniel to reconcile with his wife, but Estella, fed up with her husband’s constant failures, refuses to move back in with him out of self-respect. In a final effort to fix his life, Daniel leaves town again with Matilda giving her blessing to fulfill his dreams in aviation.

Estella brings Joan to school and reconciles with Matilda. Estella apologizes for not realizing the value of education, but Matilda apologizes for mistreating her. Estella then asks her to teach her how to read. As Estella settles down in Matilda’s class, she manages to read a note etched by Daniel on her desk when they were lovers. In an epilogue, Estella, who now takes full custody of her children from Matilda, exchanges letters with Daniel, who is now in his dream job, before taking their son to fetch Joan from school.

== Cast ==
- Lorna Tolentino as Estella
- Albert Martinez as Daniel
- Nida Blanca as Matilda
- Alicia Alonzo as Miling
- Bobby Andrews as Jojo
- Joanne Quintas as Amy
- Matet de Leon as Gina
- Aiza Marquez as Beth

== Reception ==
The Literary Coordinating Council (LCC) of the Department of Education endorsed the movie to the National Literacy Awards. Notably, a survey of that year by the National Statistics Office (NSO), stated that 2.8 Million Filipinos are not educated or illiterate while 7.4 Million are functionally literate or can only understand by small amount. The Philippine Star said that the movie is a ‘must-see’ film for the educators, students, families and to all of the people want the Philippine society to be educated.

== Awards and nominations ==
Tolentino won the FAMAS Award for Best Actress.

Awardee	Award-Giving Body	Category	Result
Lorna Tolentino	FAMAS	2001 Best Actress	Won
