= 1959 FAMAS Awards =

Annual Filipino film awards ceremony

7th FAMAS Awards
- Date: March 7, 1959
- Site: Philippines

Highlights
- Best Picture: Hanggang sa Dulo ng Daigdig (Pacific Movie Productions)
- Most awards: Hanggang sa Dulo ng Daigdig (6 wins)
- Most nominations: Talipandas (12 nominations)

The 7th Filipino Academy of Movie Arts and Sciences Awards Night was held on March 7, 1959, for the Outstanding Achievements for the year 1958.

Hanggang sa Dulo ng Daigdig under the Pacific Movie Productions won the most coveted FAMAS Award for Best Picture award. It also won the best director award, best screenplay, best editing, best cinematography and the best actor award for its lead star Pancho Magalona. On the other hand, Talipandas has the most nominations with 12, winning only 1 for its lead star, screen legend Rita Gomez.

== Awards ==
=== Major Awards ===
Winners are listed first and highlighted with boldface.

| Best Picture | Best Director |
|---|---|
| **Hanggang sa Dulo ng Daigdig — Pacific Movie Productions**; Alaalang banal — Sampaguita Pictures; Anak ng Lasengga — People's Picture; Bobby — Sampaguita Pictures; Condenado — Sampaguita Pictures; Laban sa Lahat — Premiere Productions; Singing Idol — People's Pictures; Talipandas — Sampaguita Pictures; Venganza — LVN Pictures; Water Lily — Premiere | **Gerardo de Leon — Hanggang sa Dulo ng Daigdig**; Armando Garces — Alaala Kita; Cesar Gallardo — Anak ng Lasengga; Mar S. Torres — Bobby; Armando Garces — Condenado; Cirio H. Santiago — Laban sa Lahat; Conrado Conde — Talipandas; Manuel Conde — Venganza; ACirio H. Santiago — Water Lily |
| Best Actor | Best Actress |
| **Pancho Magalona — Hanggang sa Dulo ng Daigdig**; Luis Gonzales — Alaala Kita; Fred Montilla — Bobby; Romeo Vasquez — Bobby; Van De Leon — Condenado; Eddie Del Mar — Impiyerno sa Paraiso: Fernando Poe, Jr. — Laban sa Lahat; Mario Montenegro — Rebeldey; Luis Gonzales — Talipandas | **Rita Gomez — Talipandas**; Gloria Romero — Alaalang Banal: Alicia Vergel — Anak ng Lasengga; Paraluman — Anino ni Bathala; Tessie Quintana — Batas ng Puso; Paraluman — Bobby; Lolita Rodriguez — Condenado; Mona Fernandez — Hanggang sa dulo ng daigdig; Carmencita Abad — Impyerno sa Paraiso; Olivia Cenizal — Water Lily |
| Best Supporting Actor | Best Supporting Actress |
| **Eddie Garcia — Condenado**; Tony Cayado — Alaalang Banal; Eddie Garcia — Anino ni Bathala; Ben Perez — Hanggang sa dulo ng Daigdig; Lito Anzures — Impiyerno sa Paraiso; Lauro Delgado — Laban sa Lahat: Alfonso Carvajal — Rebelde; Johnny Monteiro — Singing Idol; Eusebio Gomez — Venganza; Jose Barros — Water lily | **Marlene Daudén — Anino ni Bathala**; Bella Flores — Anino ni Bathala; Loretta De Lara — Hanggang sa dulo ng Daigdig; Belen Velasco — Laban sa Lahat; Elvira Reyes — Ang nobya kong Igorota; Rebecca Del Rio — Rebelde; Tessie Quintana — Singing Idol; Marlene Dauden — Talipandas; Bella Flores — Talipandas; Leonora Ruiz — Water Lily |
| Best in Screenplay | Best Story |
| **Cesar Amigo — Hanggang sa dulo ng Daigdig**; Luciano B. Carlos — Alaalang Banal; Teodorico C. Santos — Anak ng lasengga; Conrado Conde — Anino ni Bathala; Bert R. Mendoza — Condenado; Cesar Amigo — Laban sa Lahat; Augusto Buenaventura — Single Idol; Conrado Conde — Talipandas; Manuel Conde — Venganza; Ding M. De Jesus — Water Lily | **Susana C. de Guzman — Alaalang Banal**; Pablo S. Gomez — Anino ng Bathala; Mars Ravelo — Bobby; Francisco V. Coching — Condenado; Francisco V. Coching — Laban sa Lahat; Augusto Buenaventura Efren Reyes — Singing Idol; Francisco V. Coching — Talipandas; Manuel Conde — Venganza; Pablo S. Gomez — Water Lily |
| Best Sound Engineering | Best Musical Score |
| **Demetrio de Santos — Singing Idol**; Demetrio de Santos — Anak ng Lasengga; Joseph Straight — Anino ng Bathala; Angelo Larraga — Condenado; Flaviano Villareal — Hanggang sa dulo ng daigdig; Demetrio de Santos — Laban sa Lahat; Luis Reyes — Rebelde; Flaviano Villareal — Talipandas; Luis Reyes — Venganza; Demetrio de Santos — Water Lily | **Tony Maiquez — Water Lily**; Tony Maiquez — Anak ng Lasengga; Ariston Avelino — Condenado; Ariston Avelino — Hanggang sa dulo ng daigdig; Tito Arevalo — Impyerno sa Paraiso; Restie Umali — Kastilaloy; Francisco Buencamino Jr. — Rebelde; Tony Maiquez — Singing Idol; Nestor Robles — Talipandas; Juan Silos Jr. — Venganza |
| Best Cinematography | Best Editing |
| **Jose Pagsisihan — Hanggang sa dulo ng daigdig**; Ricardo Marcelino — Anak ng Lasengga; Higino J. Fallorina — Anino ng Bathala; Steve Perez — Condenado; Arsenio Dizon — Laban sa Lahat; Mike Accion — Rebelde; Felipe Sacdalan — Singing Idol; Hermo Santos — Talipandas; Mike Accion — Venganza; Felipe Sacdalan — Water Lily | **Fely Crisostomo — Hanggang sa dulo ng daigdig**; Atilano Salvador — Anak ng Lasengga; Jose Tarnate — Anino ng Bathala; Jose Tarnate — Condenado; Gervacio Santos — Laban sa Lahat; Enrique Jarlego — Rebelde; Gervacio Santos — Singing Idol; Jose Tarnate — Talipandas; Enrique Jarlego — Venganza; Gervacio Santos — Water Lily |

=== Special Awardee ===
- **International Prestige Award of Merit**
  - **Badjao** (LVN Pictures)
- **Dr. Ciriaco Santiago Memorial Award**
  - **Susan Roces**
- **Short Film**
  - **Gerilyang Patpat (LVN Pictures)**
