= International Prestige Award of Merit =

Annual award for Filipino film productions

The International Prestige Award of Merit was given to Filipino film productions that have been recognized internationally for their superior cinematic quality and artistry.

== Recipients ==
- 1957 Badjao (LVN Pictures)
- 1958 Anak Dalita (LVN Pictures)
- 1960 El Legado
- 1961 Bayanihan (LVN Pictures) and My Serenade (LVN Pictures)
- 1962 La Campana de Baler
