= FAMAS Award for Best Director =

Award presented annually by the Filipino Academy of Movie Arts and Sciences

- Country: Philippines
- Presented by: Filipino Academy of Movie Arts and Sciences Award
- First award: 1953
- Currently held by: Christian Acuña; Magikland (2020)

The FAMAS Award for Best Director is one of the major FAMAS Awards, given to the film director who has shown great artistic instincts, choices and excellence in assembling his or her motion picture. The FAMAS Best Director is chosen from the Filipino films shown in the previous calendar year that were screened by the FAMAS. As of the 55th FAMAS Awards, four women have picked up the award, namely Fely Crisostomo, Marilou Diaz-Abaya, Laurice Guillen and Lupita Aquino (Kashiwahara); and twenty-six men.

== Winners and nominees ==
The list may be incomplete such as some of the names of the nominees especially during the early years of FAMAS Awards.

=== 1950s ===
Year	Winner film	Nominees
1952	Gerardo de Leon – Ang Bagong Umaga	
1953	Lamberto V. Avellana – Huk Sa Bagong Pamumuhay	
1954	Cesar Gallardo – Salabusab	
1955	Gregorio Fernandez – Higit sa Lahat	Teodorico Santos – Dakilang Hudas; Manuel Conde – Ikaw Kasi; Teodorico Santos – Pandora; Armando Garces – Rosana; Natalio Bacalso – Salingsing sa Kasakit; Gerardo de Leon – Sanda Wong; Susana de Guzman – Sonny Boy
1956	Ramon A. Estella – Desperado	Gerardo de Leon – Ang Buhay at Pag-ibig ni Dr. Jose Rizal; Armando Garces – Gilda; Lamberto V. Avellana – Kumander 13; Gregorio Fernandez – Luksang Tagumpay
1957	Cesar Gallardo – Kalibre .45	Gregorio Fernandez – Hukom Roldan; Susana C. de Guzman – Krisalis; Armando Garces – Sino ang Maysala; Conrado Conde – Taga sa Bato
1958	Gerardo de Leon – Hanggang sa Dulo ng Daigdig	Armando Garces – Alaala Kita; Cesar Gallardo – Anak ng Lasengga; Mar Torres – Bobby; Armando Garces – Condenado; Cirio Santiago – Laban sa Lahat; Conrado Conde – Talipandas; Manuel Conde – Venganza; Cirio Santiago – Water Lily
1959	Jose de Villa – Kamandag	Manuel Silos – Biyaya ng Lupa; Lamberto Avellana – Cry Freedom; Armando Garces – Kilabot sa Makiling; Cesar Gallardo – Ang Maton

=== 1960s ===
Year	Winner film	Nominees
1960	Gerardo de Leon – Huwag mo Akong Limutin	Conrado Conde, Cesar Gallardo – Kadenang Putik; Leroy Salvador – Krus na Daan; Gregorio Fernandez – Kung Ako'y Mahal Mo
1961	Gerardo de Leon – Noli Me Tangere	Cesar Gallardo – Alala Kita; Gerardo de Leon – The Moises Padilla Story; Cirio H. Santiago – Mga Yapak na Walang Bakas; Pablo Santiago – Nag-uumpugang Bato
1962	Gerardo de Leon – El Filibusterismo	Gerardo de Leon – Ako ang Katarungan; Efren Reyes – Albano Brothers; Cesar Gallardo – Ligaw na Daigdig; Ding de Jesus – Madugong Paghihiganti; Armando Garces – Markang Rehas; F.H. Constantino – Oy... Akin Yata Yan; Armando Garces – Pitong Kabanalan ng Isang Makasalanan; Pablo Santiago – Walang Pagkalupig
1963	Armando De Guzman – Sapagkat Kami'y Tao Lamang	Ding M. De Jesus – Angustia; Cesar Gallardo – Dapit-hapon: Oras ng Pagtutuos; Gerardo de Leon – The Arsenio Lacson Story; Leroy Salvador – Kayo ang Humatol; F.H. Constantino – Naku... Yabang! Armando Garces – Patapon; Cesar Amigo – Sa Atin ang Daigdig; Efren Reyes – Sigaw ng Digmaan; Ronald Remy – Zigzag
1964	Lamberto V. Avellana – Scout Rangers	Cesar Gallardo – Geron Busabos: Ang Batang Quiapo; Gerardo de Leon – Kulay Dugo ang Gabi; Pablo Santiago – Kumander Fidela; Armando De Guzman – Sa Bawat Pintig ng Puso; Ding M. De Jesus – Salambao
1965	Gerardo de Leon – Ang Daigdig ng mga Api	Romy Villaflor – Ana-Roberta; Van de Leon – Anghel sa Aking Balikat; Mariano Ponce – Dugo sa Pantalan; Armando De Guzman – Iginuhit sa Buhangin; Lauro Pacheco – Mila Rosa; Efren Reyes – Pilipinas kong Mahal; Lamberto V. Avellana – A Portrait of the Artist as Filipino; Cesar Gallardo – Sapang Palay
1966	Eddie Romero – The Passionate Strangers	Efren Reyes – Dugo ang Kulay ng Pag-ibig; Gerardo de Leon – Ibulong mo sa Hangin; Cesar Gallardo – Ito ang Pilipino; Eddie Garcia – Sabotage
1967	Fely Crisostomo – Kapag Puso'y Nasugatan	Luis Nepomuceno – Dahil sa Isang Bulaklak; Romy Villaflor – Like Father, Like Son: Kung Ano ang Puno Siya ang Bunga; Armando Guzman – Maruja; Augusto Buenaventura – Valiente Brothers
1968	Luis Nepomuceno – Igorota	Arman de Guzman – Alipin ng Busabos; Pablo Santiago – Barbaro Cristobal; Armando Garces – De Colores; Tony Cayado – Donata; Eddie Rodriguez – Kasalanan Kaya; Lamberto V. Avellana – Kumander Dimas; Fely Crisostomo – Oh! My Papa; Emmanuel H. Borlaza – Psycho Maniac
1969	Eddie Garcia – Pinagbuklod ng Pag-ibig	Leroy Salvador – Badlis sa Kinabuhi; Eddie Rodriguez – Ikaw; Emmanuel Borlaza – Kapatid ko ang Aking Ina; Augusto Buenaventura – Dugo ng Bayani

=== 1970s ===
Year	Winner film	Nominees
1970	Lino Brocka – Tubog sa Ginto	Armando De Guzman – Mga Anghel na Walang Langit; Eddie Rodriguez – Bakit Ako Pa? Eddie Garcia – Crisis; Augusto Buenaventura – Psycho Sex Killer
1971	Gerardo de Leon – Lilet	Emmanuel H. Borlaza – I Love Mama, I Love Papa; Celso Ad. Castillo – Nympha; Ishmael Bernal – Pagdating sa Dulo; Lino Brocka – Stardoom; Augusto Buenaventura – Ang Uliran; Arsenio Bautista – Hukom Bitay
1972	Celso Ad. Castillo – Ang Alamat	Eddie Rodriguez – Babae... Ikaw ang Dahilan; Manuel 'Fyke' Cinco – Isinilang ang Anak ng Ibang Babae; Tony Cayado – Nardong Putik; Armando Garces – Sukdulan; Lino Brocka – Villa Miranda
1973	Jun Raquiza – Dalawang Mukha ng Tagumpay	Augusto Buenaventura – Erap is My Guy; Celso Ad Castillo – Esteban; Armando De Guzman – Hindi na Sisikat ang Araw; Eddie Rodriguez – Lalaki, Kasalanan Mo; Pablo Santiago – Nueva Vizcaya; George Rowe – Parung-parung Itim
1974	Lino Brocka – Tinimbang Ka Ngunit Kulang	Eddie Rodriguez – Ala-ala mo, Daigdig ko Pablo Santiago – Batingaw; Elwood Perez – Isang Gabi... Tatlong Babae; Jun Raquiza – Krimen: Kayo ang Humatol; Cesar Gallardo – Manila Connection; Luis Nepomuceno – The Pacific Connection; Celso Ad Castillo – Ang Pinakamagandang Hayop sa Balat ng Lupa; Joey Gosiengfiao – Sunugin ang Samar
1975	Lino Brocka – Maynila.. Sa Kuko ng Liwanag	Fernando Poe Jr. – Alupihang Dagat; Augusto Buenaventura – Diligin Mo ng Hamog ang Uhaw na Lupa; Ishmael Bernal – Lumapit, Lumayo ang Umaga
1976	Lupita Aquino-Kashiwahara – Minsa'y isang Gamu-gamo	Eddie Romero – Ganito Kami Noon... Paano Kayo Ngayon? Lino Brocka – Insiang; Mike de Leon – The Rites of May; Mario O'Hara – Tatlong taong walang Diyos
1977	Augusto Buenaventura – Bakya Mo Neneng	Pablo Santiago – Bontoc; Manuel Conde – Hostage... Hanapin si Batuigas! Celso Ad. Castillo – Sa Dulo ng Krus; Lino Brocka – Tahan na Empoy, Tahan
1978	Celso Ad Castillo – Pagputi ng Uwak, Pagitim ng Tagak	Eddie Garcia – Atsay; Lino Brocka – Gumising Ka Maruja; Danny L. Zialcita – Hindi sa Iyo ang Mundo, Baby Porcuna; Ishmael Bernal – Isang Gabi sa Iyo... Isang Gabi sa Akin
1979	Lino Brocka – Jaguar	Armando A. Herrera – Durugin si Totoy Bato; Manuel Fyke Cinco – Huwag, Bayaw; Pablo Santiago – Kasal-kasalan, Bahay-bahayan; Robert Arevalo – Sino'ng Pipigil sa Pagpakat ng Ulan

=== 1980s ===
Year	Winner film	Nominees
1980	Eddie Romero – Aguila	Marilou Diaz-Abaya – Brutal; Mike De Leon – Kakabakaba ka ba? Danny L. Zialcita – Langis at Tubig; Romy Suzura – Pag-ibig ng Walang Dangal; Augusto Buenaventura – Taga sa Panahon
1981	Augusto Buenaventura – Kumander Alibasbas	Mario O'Hara – Bakit Bughaw ang Langit; Eddie Rodriguez – Init o Lamig; Elwood Perez – Pakawalan Mo Ako; Laurice Guillen – Salome
1982	Eddie Garcia – Sinasamba Kita	Lino Brocka – Cain at Abel; Danny L. Zialcita – Gaano Kadalas ang Minsan; Ishmael Bernal – Himala; Fernando Poe Jr. – Ang Panday: Ikatlong Yugto; Marilou Diaz-Abaya – Moral
1983	Marilou Diaz-Abaya – Karnal	Ishmael Bernal – Broken Marriage; Danny L. Zialcita – Nagalit ang Buwan sa Haba ng Gabi; Eddie Garcia – Paano ba ang Mangarap; Carlo J. Caparas – Pieta; Maryo J. de los Reyes – Saan Darating ang Umaga? Fernando Poe Jr. – Umpisahan Mo... Tatapusin Ko
1984	Fernando Poe Jr. – Ang Padrino	Mario O'Hara – Bulaklak sa City Jail; Manuel Fyke Cinco – Pasukin si Waway; Danny L. Zialcita – Nang Masugatan ang Gabi; Carlo J. Caparas – Pieta: Ikalawang Aklat; Mike De Leon – Sister Stella L. Ishmael Bernal – Working Girls
1985	Celso Ad Castillo – Paradise Inn	Danny L. Zialcita – Bakit Manipis ang Ulap; Lino Brocka – Bayan Ko: Kapit sa Patalim; Lino Brocka – Miguelito: Batang Rebelde; Ben Yalung – Partida
1986	Eddie Garcia – Magdusa Ka	Pepe Marcos – Gabi Na, Kumander; Manuel Fyke Cinco – Lumuhod Ka sa Lupa; Fernando Poe Jr. – Muslim Magnum .357; Mel Chionglo – Nasaan Ka ng Kailangan Kita; Peque Gallaga – Unfaithful Wife
1987	Eddie Garcia – Saan Nagtatago ang Pag-ibig	Leroy Salvador – Alabok sa Lupa; Mel Chionglo – Paano Kung Wala Ka Na; Ishmael Bernal – Pinulot Ka Lang sa Lupa; Maryo J. De los Reyes – Tagos ng Dugo
1988	Elwood Perez – Ibulong mo sa Diyos	Carlo J. Caparas – Bubble's Ativan Gang; Eddie Garcia – Huwag Mong Itanong Kung Bakit; Maria Saret – Lorenzo Ruiz... The Saint... A Filipino! Laurice Guillen – Magkano Ang Iyong Dangal? Ishmael Bernal – Nagbabagang Luha; Emmanuel H. Borlaza – Paano Tatakasan ang Bukas?
1989	Elwood Perez – Bilangin Ang Bituin Sa Langit; Eddie Garcia –Imortal	Fernando Poe Jr. – Ako ... ang Huhusga; Manuel 'Fyke' Cinco – Ipaglalaban Ko; Augusto Salvador – Joe Pring: Homicide Manila Police; Lino Brocka – Macho Dancer; Ishmael Bernal – Pahiram ng Isang Umaga

=== 1990s ===
Year	Winner film	Nominees
1990	Lino Brocka – Gumapang Ka Sa Lusak	Gil Portes – Andrea, Paano Ba ang Maging Isang Ina? Chito S. Roño – A Moment Too Long; Pepe Marcos – Kaaway ng Batas; Maryo J. De los Reyes – My Other Woman
1991	Elwood Perez – Ang Totoong Buhay ni Pacita M.	Fernando Poe Jr. – Batas ng .45; Carlos Siguion-Reyna – Hihintayin Kita sa Langit; Christopher De Leon – Huwag Mong Salingin ang Sugat Ko; Laurice Guillen – Ipagpatawad Mo
1992	Carlos Siguion-Reyna – Ikaw Pa Lang ang Minahal	Jose Javier Reyes – Iisa Pa Lamang; Laurice Guillen – Lumayo Ka Man sa Akin; Chito S. Roño – Narito ang Puso Ko; Maryo J. De los Reyes – Sinungaling Mong Puso
1993	Augusto Salvador – Masahol Pa Sa Hayop	Laurice Guillen – Because I Love You; Joe Mari Avellana – Kung Mawawala Ka Pa; Jose Javier Reyes – May Minamahal; Raymond Red – Sakay
1994	Carlo J. Caparas – Lipa 'Arandia' Massacre: Lord, Deliver Us from Evil	Olivia M. Lamasan – Maalaala Mo Kaya: The Movie; Jose Javier Reyes – Nag-iisang Bituin; Joel Lamangan – Pangako ng Kahapon; Chito S. Roño – Separada
1995	Fernando Poe Jr. & Willy Milan – Kahit Butas ng Karayom	Chito S. Roño – Dahas; Joel Lamangan – The Flor Contemplacion Story; Carlos Siguion-Reyna – Harvest Home; Olivia M. Lamasan – Sana Maulit Muli
1996	Antonio Jose Perez – Mumbaki	Olivia M. Lamasan – Madrasta; Marilou Diaz-Abaya – May Nagmamahal Sa Iyo; Gil Portes – Mulanay: Sa Pusod ng Paraiso; Tikoy Aguiluz – Segurista
1997	Tikoy Aguiluz – Rizal sa Dapitan	Joe Mari Avellana – Damong Ligaw; Olivia M. Lamasan – Hanggang Kailan Kita Mamahalin; Chito S. Roño – Where is the Heart; Joel Lamangan – The Sarah Balabagan Story
1998	Marilou Diaz-Abaya – José Rizal	Chito S. Roño – Lea's Story; Carlo J. Caparas – Hiwaga ng Panday; Fernando Poe Jr. – Pagbabalik ng Probinsyano; Jose N. Carreon – Sambahin ang Ngalan Mo
1999	Marilou Diaz-Abaya – Muro-ami	Maryo J. De los Reyes – Higit Pa sa Buhay Ko; Gil Portes – Saranggola; Joel Lamangan – Sidhi; Jerry Lopez Sineneng – Soltera

=== 2000s ===
Year	Winner film	Nominees
2000	Laurice Guillen – Tanging Yaman	Rory Quintos – Anak; Carlos Siguion-Reyna – Azucena; Joel Lamangan – Deathrow; Jose Javier Reyes – Tunay na Mahal
2001	Marilou Diaz-Abaya – Bagong Buwan	Augusto Salvador – Alas-Dose; Gil Portes – In the Bosom of the Enemy; Tikoy Aguiluz – Tatarin; Chito S. Roño – Yamashita: The Tiger's Treasure
2002	Gil Portes – Mga Munting Tinig	Fernando Poe Jr. – Batas ng Lansangan; Rory Quintos – Kailangan Kita; Joel Lamangan – Mano Po
2003	Maryo J. De los Reyes – Magnifico	Mark Meily – Crying Ladies; Joel Lamangan – Filipinas; Gil Portes – Homecoming; Marilou Diaz-Abaya – Noon at Ngayon
2004	Maryo J. De los Reyes – Naglalayag	Joel Lamangan – Aishite Imasu 1941: Mahal Kita; Cesar Montano – Panaghoy sa Suba; Laurice Guillen – Santa Santita
2005	Cholo Laurel – Nasaan ka Man	Joel Lamangan – Mano Po 4: Ako Legal Wife; Rory Quintos – Dubai; Jose Javier Reyes – Kutob; Ellen Ongkeko-Marfil – Mga Pusang Gala
2006	Jose Javier Reyes – Kasal, Kasali, Kasalo	Joyce Bernal – Don't Give Up on Us; Pablo Biglang-awa, Veronica Velasco – Inang Yaya; Brillante Mendoza – Summer Heat; Jeffrey Jeturian – Kubrador
2007	Maryo J. De los Reyes – A Love Story	Neal 'Buboy' Tan – Ataul: For Rent; Adolfo Alix Jr. – Batanes: Sa Dulo Ng Walang Hanggan; Jose Javier Reyes – Katas ng Saudi; Mark Reyes – Resiklo
2008	Ed Palmos – Ay Ayeng	Mark Meily – Baler; Chito S. Roño – Caregiver; Joyce Bernal – For the First Time; Jose Javier Reyes – Magkaibigan; Dante Nico Garcia – Ploning
2009	Joel Lamangan – Dukot	Joel Lamangan – Sagrada Familia; Joel Lamangan – Mano Po 6: A Mother's Love; Laurice Guillen – I Love You, Goodbye; Mac Alejandre – Ang Panday; Olivia Lamasan – In My Life; Brillante Mendoza – Kinatay

=== 2010s ===
Year	Winner film	Nominees
2010	Albert Martinez – Rosario	Rodel Nacianceno, Dondon S. Santos – Noy; Cathy Garcia-Molina – Miss You like Crazy; Wenn V. Deramas – Ang Tanging Ina Mo (Last na 'To!); Laurice Guillen – Sa 'yo Lamang
2011	Tikoy Aguiluz – Manila Kingpin: The Asiong Salonga Story	Yam Laranas – The Road; Ruel S. Bayani – No Other Woman; John D. Lazatin – A Mother's Story; Olivia Lamasan – In the Name of Love; Mac Alejandre – Ang Panday 2 Joyce Bernal – Segunda Mano
2012	Mark Meily – El Presidente	Ruel S. Bayani – One More Try; Joel Lamangan – Migrante; Nuel Crisostomo Naval – A Secret Affair; Olivia Lamasan – The Mistress
2013	Erik Matti – On the Job	Joyce E. Bernal – 10,000 Hours; Mel Chionglo – Lauriana; Jeffrey Jeturian – Ekstra; Joel Lamangan – Burgos; Cathy Garcia-Molina – Four Sisters and A Wedding; Frasco Mortiz – Pagpag: Siyam na Buhay; Chito Roño – Boy Golden: Shoot to Kill, the Arturo Porcuna Story
2014	Enzo Williams – Bonifacio: Ang Unang Pangulo	Cathy Garcia-Molina – She's Dating The Gangster; Chito Roño – Feng Shui 2 Chito Roño – The Trial; Francis Posadas – Magnum Muslim .357; Jason Paul Laxamana – Magkakabaung; Joel Lamangan – Hustisya; Joel Lamangan – Kamkam; Luisito Ignacio – Asintado; Olivia Lamasan – Starting Over Again
2015	Joel Lamangan – Felix Manalo	Tikoy Aguiluz – Tragic TheaterCarlo J. Caparas – Angela MarkadoCarlo Encisco Catu – Ari: My Life with A King Mae Czarina Cruz-Alviar – Crazy Beautiful You Cathy Garcia-Molina – A Second ChanceRoy Sevilla Ho, Jeffrey Hidalgo – Silong Antoinette Jadaone – You're My Boss Nuel C. Naval – The Love Affair Andoy Ranay – Para sa Hopeless Romantic
2016	Olivia M. Lamasan – Barcelona: A Love Untold	Joyce Bernal – Everything About Her; Rahyan Carlos – Ringgo: The Dog Shooter Mel Chionglo – Iadya Mo Kami; Maryo J. de los Reyes – The Unmarried Wife
2017	Arnel Barbarona – Tu Pug Imatuy	Khavn de la Cruz – Balangiga: Howling WildernessAntoinette Jadaone – Love You to the Stars and BackTreb Monteras II – RespetoTop Nazareno – Kiko Boksingero; Mikhail Red – Birdshot; Shireen Seño – Nervous Translation; Victor Delotavo Tagaro/Toshihiko Uriu – Yield
2018	Dwein Baltazar – Gusto Kita With All My Hypothalamus	Whammy Alcazaren – Fisting: Never Tear Us Apart; Lav Diaz – Ang Panahon ng Halimaw; Timmy Harn – Dog Days; Erik Matti – BuyBust; Joel Ruiz – Kung Paano Siya Nawala; Jerrold Tarog – Goyo: Ang Batang Heneral
2019	Raymund Bibay Gutierrez – Verdict	Glenn Barit – Cleaners Arden Rod Condez – John Denver Trending; Jet Leyco – For My Alien Friend; Jun Lana – Kalel, 15; Rae Red – Babae at Baril

=== 2020s ===
Year	Winner film	Nominees
2020	Christian Acuña – Magikland	Antoinette Jadaone – Fan GirlJoel Lamangan – Isa Pang BahaghariAvid Liongoren – Hayop Ka! Ben Rekhi – Watchlist Irene Villamor – On Vodka, Beers, and Regrets
2021	Vince Tañada – Katips	Law Fajardo – A Hard Day Jun Lana – Big Night Carlo Francisco Manatad – Kun Maupay Man It PanahonMikhail Red – Arisaka

== Superlatives ==
Superlative	Best Director	
Director with most awards	Gerardo de Leon	7
Director with most nominations	Gerardo de Leon; Lino Brocka	14
Director with most nominations without ever winning	Armando Garces	11
Oldest winner	Eddie Garcia	69
Youngest winner	Lino Brocka	32
Most consecutive wins	Gerardo de Leon	3
Most consecutive nominations	Cesar Gallardo	10
