= 1969 FAMAS Awards =

Annual Filipino film awards ceremony

17th FAMAS Awards
- Date: April 26, 1969
- Site: Coral Ball Room, Manila Hilton; Manila, Philippines

Highlights
- Best Picture: Igorota (Nepomuceno Productions)
- Most awards: Igorota (8 wins)

The 17th Filipino Academy of Movie Arts and Sciences Awards Night took place on April 26, 1969, honoring films released in 1968. It was the most attended FAMAS ceremony at the time it was held. President Ferdinand Marcos was a guest speaker at the ceremony, presenting awards and pledging to provide government resources to support the film industry.

Igorota, produced by Nepomuceno Productions, won eight FAMAS Awards, including Best Picture and Best Actress for Charito Solis.

== Awards ==
=== Major awards ===
Winners are listed first and highlighted with boldface.

Best Picture	Best Director
**Igorota — Nepomuceno Productions.**; Artista ang Aking Asawa — Lea Productions; Barbaro Cristobal — FPJ Productions; De Colores — Arco Iris Productions; Kasalanan Kaya? — Virgo Film Productions; Oh! My Papa — Lea Productions; Psycho Maniac — Regina Productions; Salamisim — Lea Productions; Siete Dolores — Virgo Film Productions	**Luis Nepomuceno — Igorota**; Arman de Guzman — Alipin ng Busabos; Pablo Santiago — Barbaro Cristobal; Armando Garces — De Colores; Tony Cayado — Donata; Eddie Rodriguez — Kasalanan Kaya; Lamberto V. Avellana — Kumander Dimas; Fely Crisostomo — Oh! My Papa; Emmanuel H. Borlaza — Psycho Maniac
Best Actor	Best Actress
**Eddie Garcia — De Colores**; Dolphy — Artista ang AKing Asawa; Fernando Poe Jr. — Barbaro Cristobal; Joseph Estrada — Galo Gimbal; Ric Rodrigo — Igorota; Eddie Rodriguez — Kasalanan Kaya?; Vic Vargas — Kumander Dimas; Dindo Fernando — Psycho Maniac; Nestor De Villa — Siete Dolores; Max Alvarado — Tatak: Sacramentados	**Charito Solis — Igorota**; Marlene Daudén — Alipin ng Busabos; Barbara Perez — Barbaro Cristobal; Perla Bautista — De Colores; Gina Pareño — Ruby; Lolita Rodriguez — Kasalanan Kaya?; Boots Anson-Roa — Siete Dolores; Rebecca — Tatak: Sacramentados; Susan Roces — To Susan with Love
Best Supporting Actor	Best Supporting Actress
**Fred Galang — Igorota**; Dante Rivero — Alipin ng Busabos; Panchito — Dakilang Tanga; Eddie Infante — Dambana ng Kagitingan; Johnny Montiero — Galo Gimbal; Vic Silayan — Kumander Dimas; Dindo Fernando — Liku-likong Landas; Lauro Delgado — Salamisim; Renato Robles — Siete Dolores	**Lourdes Medel — Salamisim**; Liberty Ilagan — Alipin ng Busabos; Katy de la Cruz — Dakilang Tanga; Verna Gaston — Elizabeth; Eva Darren — Igorota; Vilma Santos — Kasalanan Kaya?; Margie Tanquintic — Kumander Dimas; Rosa Mia — Liku-likong Landas; Caridad Sanchez — Ngitngit ng pitong whistle Bomb; Mary Walter — Psycho Maniac
Best in Screenplay	Best Story
**Emmanuel H. Borlaza — Kasalanan Kaya?**	**Liza Moreno — Kasalanan Kaya**
Best Sound Engineering	Best Musical Score
**Juanito Clemente — Igorota**	**Tony Maiquez — Kasalan Kaya?**; **Tito Arevalo — Igorota**
Best Cinematography (Color)	Best Cinematography (Black and White)
**Loreta Isleta — Igorota**	**Ricardo Remias — Kasalanan Kaya**
Best Editing	Best Child Performer
**Elsa Abutan — Igorota**	**Zernan Manaha — Barbaro Cristobal**

=== Special Awardee ===
- **POSTHUMOUS Award**
  - **Jess Lapid**
  - **Carlos Vander Tolosa**
