= 1964 FAMAS Awards =

Annual Filipino film awards ceremony

12th FAMAS Awards
- Date: 1964
- Site: Philippines

Highlights
- Best Picture: Sigaw Ng Digmaan ( FPJ Productions )
- Most awards: Sapagkat Kami'y Tao Lamang ( Hollywood-Far East Productions ) (7 wins)
- Most nominations: Sapagkat Kami'y Tao Lamang (10 nominations)

The 12th Filipino Academy of Movie Arts and Sciences Awards Night was presented by the Filipino Academy of Movie Arts and Sciences in 1964 honoring the outstanding achievements of Filipino films for the year 1963.

Sapagkat Kami'y Tao Lamang was the most nominated film of the 12th FAMAS Awards with 10 nominations and won 7 awards including the best actor award for Eddie Rodriguez. However, it failed to win the most coveted award and that is the FAMAS Award for Best Picture which goes to Sigaw Ng Digmaan a war movie which starred Fernando Poe Jr.

== Awards ==
=== Major Awards ===
Winners are listed first and highlighted with boldface.

Best Picture	Best Director
**Sigaw ng Digmaan — FPJ Productions**; Angustia —; Dapit Hapon: Oras ng pagtutuus — Bernard Bonnin Productions; Ito ang Maynila — Tagalog Ilang-ilang Productions; Naku.. Yabang! — Dalisay Pictures; Sa Atin ang Daigdig — Premiere Productions; Sapgkat kami'y Tao Lamang — Hollywood-Far East Productions; Zigzag — Medallion Pictures	**Armando De Guzman — Sapagkat Kami'y Tao Lamang**; Ding M. De Jesus — Angustia; Cesar Gallardo — Dapit-hapon: Oras ng Pagtutuos; Gerardo de Leon — The Arsenio Lacson Story; Leroy Salvador — Kayo ang Humatol; F.H. Constantino — Naku... Yabang!; Armando Garces — Patapon; Cesar Amigo — Sa Atin ang Daigdig; Efren Reyes — Sigaw ng Digmaan; Ronald Remy — Zigzag
Best Actor	Best Actress
Eddie Rodriguez — Sapagkat kami'y tao Lamang: Van de Leon — 3 Mukha ni Pandora; Joseph Estrada — Ito ang Maynila; Fred Montilla — The Arsenio Lacson Story; Nestor de Villa — Naku.. Yabang!; Robert Arevalo — Sa Atin ang Daigdig; Eddie Mesa — Sa Atin ang Daigdig; Fernando Poe Jr. — Sigaw ng Digmaan; Juancho Gutierez — Tres Kantos; George Nakar — Zigzag	**Charito Solis — Angustia**; Rebecca — Ito ang Maynila; Gloria Sevilla — Kami'y Kaawaan; Luz Valdez — Kayo ang Humatol; Liza Morena — he Arsenio Lacson Story: Nida Blanca — Naku.. Yabang; Perla Bautista — Patapon; Cecilia Lopez — Sa Atin ang Daigdig; Lolita Rodriguez — Sapagkat kami'y tao lamang; Sylvia Lawrence — Zigzag
Best Supporting Actor	Best Supporting Actress
**Lito Anzures — Sigaw ng Digmaan**; Teody Belarmino — Angustia; Johny Monteiro — Batid ng Diyos; Dencio Padilla — Ito ang Maynila; Martin Marfil — Kami'y Kaawaan; Nello Nayo — Sapagkat kami'y Tao Lamang; Max Alvarado — Tiger Unit; Oscar Keesee — Zigzag; Vic Silayan — Zigzag	**Marlene Daudén — Sapagkat kami'y Tao Lamang**; Gloria Sevilla — 3 Mukha ni Pandora; Elizabeth Ramsey — Ang Bukas ay Akin; Zeny Zabala — Ang Bukas ay Akin; Vilma Valera — Duelo sa Sapang Bato; Melinda Molina — Ito ang Maynila; Patria Plata — Kami'y Kaawaan; Caridad Sanchez — Magtiis ka, darling; Marietta Sanz — Naku.. Yabang!; Mary Walter — Tres Cantos!
Best in Screenplay	Best Story
**Johnny Pangilinan — Sapagka't Kami'y Tao Lamang**	**Mario Mijares Lopez — Sapagka't Kami'y Tao Lamang**
Best Sound Engineering	Best Musical Score
**Flaviano Villareal — Zigzag**	**Tony Maiquez — Sapagka't Kami'y Tao Lamang**
Best Cinematography	Best Editing
**Sergio Lobo — Sigaw Ng Digmaan**	**Atilano Salvador — Sigaw Ng Digmaan**
Best Theme Song	Best Child Performer
**Tony Maiquez — Sapagka't Kami'y Tao Lamang**	**Vilma Santos — Trudis Liit**

=== Special Awardee ===
- **Dr. Ciriaco Santiago Memorial Award**
  - **Eddie Romero (for "Cavalry Command")**
