= 1968 FAMAS Awards =

Annual Filipino film awards ceremony

16th FAMAS Awards
- Date: 1968
- Site: Philippines

Highlights
- Best Picture: Kapag Puso'y Sinugatan (Virgo Film Productions)
- Most awards: Kapag Puso'y Sinugatan (8 wins)

The 16th Filipino Academy of Movie Arts and Sciences Awards Night was held in 1968 for the Outstanding Achievements for the year 1967.

Kapag Puso'y Sinugatan of Virgo Film Productions won 8 FAMAS Awards including the FAMAS Award for Best Picture and Best actress for Marlene Dauden.

== Awards ==
=== Major Awards ===
Winners are listed first and highlighted with boldface.

Best Picture	Best Director
**Kapag Puso'y Sinugatan — Virgo Film Productions.**; Dahil sa Isang Bulaklak — Nepomuceno Productions; Ang Langit ay Para sa Akin — LL Productions; O! Pagsintang Labis — Virgo Film Productions; Valiente Brothers — Emar Pictures	**Fely Crisostomo — Kapag Puso'y Sinugatan**; Luis Nepomuceno — Dahil sa Isang Bulaklak; Romy Villaflor — Like Father, Like Son: Kung Ano ang Puno Siya ang Bunga; Armando Guzman — Maruja; Augusto Buenaventura — Valiente Brothers
Best Actor	Best Actress
**Fernando Poe Jr. — Mga Alabok sa Lupa**; Ric Rodrigo — Dahil sa Isang Bulaklak; Eddie Rodriguez — Kapag Puso'y Sinugatan; Dolphy — Like father, like son: Kung ano ang puno siya ang bunga; Romeo Vasquez — Maruja	**Marlene Daudén — Kapag Puso'y Sinugatan**; Charito Solis — Dahil sa Isang Bulaklak; Susan Roces — Maruja; Amalia Fuentes — O! Pagsintang Labis; Zeny Zabala — Ruby
Best Supporting Actor	Best Supporting Actress
**Rod Navarro — Dahil sa Isang Bulaklak**; Renato Robles — Kapag Puso'y Sinugatan; Panchito — Like father, like son: Kung ano ang puno siya ang bunga; Johnny Wilson — O! Pagsintang Labis; Eddie Garcia — Valiente Brothers	**Bella Flores — Kaibigan kong Sto. Niño**; Patricia Mijares — Kapag Puso'y Sinugatan; Lilian Leonardo — Ang Langit ay para sa Akin; Eva Darren — Ang Langit sa Lupa; Rosa Mia — Love and Devotion
Best in Screenplay	Best Story
**Nilo Saez — Kapag Puso'y Sinugatan**	**Louise de Mesa — Kapag Puso'y Sinugatan**
Best Sound Engineering	Best Musical Score
**Juanito Clemente — Dahil sa Isang Bulaklak**	**Tony Maiquez — Kapag Puso'y Sinugatan**
Best Cinematography (Color)	Best Cinematography (Black and White)
**Luis Nepomuceno — Dahil sa Isang Bulaklak**	**Ricardo Remias — Kapag Puso'y Sinugatan**
Best Editing	Best Child Performer
**Gervacio Santos — Kapag Puso'y Sinugatan**	**Gina Alajar — Kaibigan kong Sto. Niño**

=== Special Awardee ===
- **Dr. Ciriaco Santiago Memorial Award**
  - **Emmanuel Rojas**
