= FAMAS Award for Best Supporting Actress =

Award presented annually by the Filipino Academy of Movie Arts and Sciences

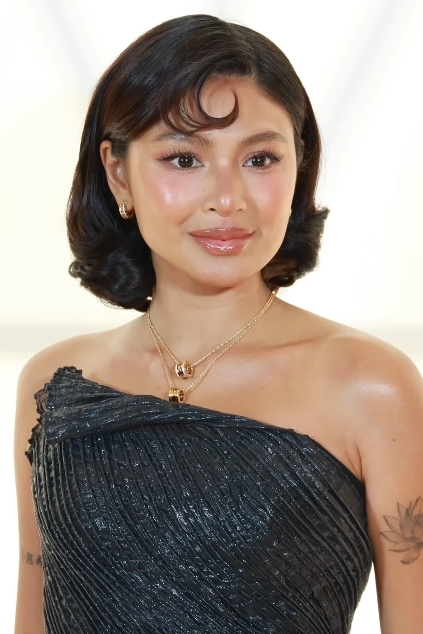
- 2025 recipient Nadine Lustre
- Awarded for: Best Performance by an Actress in a Supporting Role
- Country: Philippines
- Presented by: Filipino Academy of Movie Arts and Sciences Award
- First award: 1952
- Currently held by: Nadine Lustre; Uninvited (2024)

The FAMAS Award for Best Supporting Actress is one of the FAMAS Awards given to people working in the motion picture industry by the Filipino Academy of Movie Arts and Sciences Award, which are voted on by Palanca Award-winning writers and movie columnists and writers within the industry.

== Winners and nominees ==
The list may be incomplete such as some of the names of the nominees and the roles portrayed especially during the early years of FAMAS Awards.

- Note - The year indicates the awards for the films of that year when those films were originally released. Please refer to the Academy Awards how they label the awards for the films original release date and not the awards ceremony date.

Table key
‡	Indicates the winner

=== 1950s ===
Year	Actress	Film	Role
1952 (1st)
1952 (1st)	Nida Blanca‡	Korea	
1952 (1st)	Rita Gomez	Sawa sa Lumang Simboryo	Marta
1953 (1st)
1953 (1st)	Katy de la Cruz‡	Inspirasiyon	
1953 (1st)	Carol Varga	Habang Buhay	
1954 (3rd)
1954 (3rd)	Carol Varga‡	Guwapo	
1955 (4th)
1955 (4th)	Celia Fuentes‡	Simaron	Marianna
1955 (4th)	Belen Velasco	Dakilang Hudas	
1955 (4th)	Carol Varga	Paltik	
1955 (4th)	Daisy Romualdez	Lupang Kayumanggi	
1955 (4th)	Ligaya Lopez	Sanda Wong	
1955 (4th)	Loida Morales	Talusaling	
1955 (4th)	Ludy Carmona	Talusaling	Mary
1955 (4th)	Norma Vales	Lupang Kayumanggi	
1955 (4th)	Rosa Mia	Rossana	
1956 (5th)
1956 (5th)	Rosa Mia‡	Tumbando Caña	Desta
1956 (5th)	Letty Ojera	Walang Panginoon	
1956 (5th)	Maria Cristina	Tumbando Caña	
1956 (5th)	Rebecca del Rio	Luksang Tagumpay	
1956 (5th)	Rosa Aguirre	Ulilang Bituin	
1957 (6th)
1957 (6th)	Etang Discher‡	Busabos	
1957 (6th)	Bella Flores	Busabos	
1957 (6th)	Leonor Vergara	Kamay ni Cain	
1957 (6th)	Patria Plata	Kandilang Bakal	
1957 (6th)	Rebecca del Rio	Krisalis	
1958 (7th)
1958 (7th)	Marlene Daudén‡	Anino Ni Bathala	Sylvia
1958 (7th)	Belen Velasco	Laban Sa Lahat	
1958 (7th)	Bella Flores	Anino ni Bathala	
1958 (7th)	Bella Flores	Talipandas	
1958 (7th)	Elvira Reyes	Ang Nobya kong Igorota	
1958 (7th)	Leonora Ruiz	Water Lily	
1958 (7th)	Loretta de Lara	Hanggang sa Dulo ng Daigdig	
1958 (7th)	Marlene Daudén	Talipandas	
1958 (7th)	Rebecca del Rio	Rebelde	
1958 (7th)	Tessie Quintana	Singing Idol	
1959 (8th)
1959 (8th)	Marlene Daudén‡	Kamandag	
1959 (8th)	Bella Flores	Kilabot sa Makiling	
1959 (8th)	Etang Discher	Tanikalang Apoy	
1959 (8th)	Marita Zobel	Biyaya ng Lupa	Angelita
1959 (8th)	Rosa Aguirre	Kundiman ng Lahi	
1959 (8th)	Rosa Mia	Kamandag	

=== 1960s ===
Year	Actress	Film	Role
1960 (9th)
1960 (9th)	Arsenia Francisco‡	Huwag Mo Akong Limutin	
1960 (9th)	Barbara Perez	Gumuhong Bantayog	
1960 (9th)	Carol Varga	Akin ang Paghihiganti	
1960 (9th)	Mary Walter	Krus na Daan	
1960 (9th)	Patria Plata	Emily	
1961 (10th)
1961 (10th)	Lina Cariño‡	Noli me tángere	Sisa
1961 (10th)	Elvira Reyes	Mga Yapak na Walang Bakas	
1961 (10th)	Lilian Leonardo	Pusong Bakal	
1961 (10th)	Rosa Aguirre	The Moises Padilla Story	
1961 (10th)	Vilma Valera	Nag-uumpugang Bato	
1962 (11th)
1962 (11th)	Gloria Sevilla‡	Madugong Paghihiganti	
1962 (11th)	Adorable Liwanag	Ako ang Katarungan	
1962 (11th)	Edita Clomera	Sakdalista	
1962 (11th)	Lita Gutierrez	Oy... Akin ata Yan	
1962 (11th)	Ludy San Juan	Suicide Susy	
1962 (11th)	Monang Carvajal	El Filibusterismo	
1962 (11th)	Rosa Aguirre	Mahal Kita Inay	
1962 (11th)	Stella Suarez	Siete Bandidos	
1962 (11th)	Yolanda Guevarra	Sino ang Matapang?	
1963 (12th)
1963 (12th)	Marlene Daudén‡	Sapagkat Kami'y Tao Lamang	
1963 (12th)	Caridad Sanchez	Magtiis Ka, Darling	
1963 (12th)	Elizabeth Ramsey	Ang Bukas Ay Akin	
1963 (12th)	Gloria Sevilla	3 Mukha ni Pandora	
1963 (12th)	Marietta Sanz	Naku... Yabang!	
1963 (12th)	Mary Walter	Tres Cantos	
1963 (12th)	Melinda Molina	Ito ang Maynila	
1963 (12th)	Patria Plata	Kami'y Kaawaan	
1963 (12th)	Vilma Valera	Duelo sa Sapang Bato	
1963 (12th)	Zeny Zabala	Ang Bukas Ay Akin	
1964 (13th)
1964 (13th)	Celia Rodriguez‡	Kulay Dugo ang Gabi	
1964 (13th)	Alona Alegre	Sa Bawat Pintig ng Puso	
1964 (13th)	Caridad Sanchez	Scout Rangers	
1964 (13th)	Leni Trinidad	Geron Busabos: Ang Batang Quiapo	
1964 (13th)	Maggie dela Riva	Lagablab sa Maribojoc	
1965 (14th)
1965 (14th)	Leni Alano‡	Ang Daigdig ng mga Api	
1965 (14th)	Elizabeth Flores	Sa Oras ng Kadiliman	
1965 (14th)	Eva Montes	Big Boss	
1965 (14th)	Gloria Sevilla	Sapang Palay	
1965 (14th)	Mary Walter	Pilipinas Kong Mahal	
1965 (14th)	Naty Crame-Rogers	A Portrait of the Artist as Filipino	
1965 (14th)	Patricia Mijares	Iginuhit sa Buhangin	
1965 (14th)	Rosa Mia	Ana Roberta	
1965 (14th)	Vilma Santos	Maria Cecilia	
1966 (15th)
1966 (15th)	Celia Rodriguez‡	The Passionate Strangers	
1966 (15th)	Gloria Sevilla	Ito ang Pilipino	
1966 (15th)	Lucita Soriano	Dugo ang Kulay ng Pag-ibig	
1966 (15th)	Mary Walter	Ibulong Mo sa Hangin	
1966 (15th)	Rosa Mia	Bakit Pa Ako Isinilang	
1967 (16th)
1967 (16th)	Bella Flores‡	Kaibigan kong Sto. Niño	
1967 (16th)	Eva Darren	Ang Langit sa Lupa	
1967 (16th)	Lilian Leonardo	Ang Langit ay Para sa Akin	
1967 (16th)	Patricia Mijares	Kapag Puso'y Nasugatan	
1967 (16th)	Rosa Mia	Love and Devotion	
1968 (17th)
1968 (17th)	Lourdes Medel‡	Salamisim	
1968 (17th)	Caridad Sanchez	Ngitngit ng Pitong Whistle Bomb	
1968 (17th)	Eva Darren	Igorota	
1968 (17th)	Katy de la Cruz	Dakilang Tanga	
1968 (17th)	Liberty Ilagan	Alipin ng Busabos	
1968 (17th)	Margie Tanquintic	Kumander Dimas	
1968 (17th)	Mary Walter	Psycho Maniac	
1968 (17th)	Rosa Mia	Liku-likong Landas	
1968 (17th)	Verna Gaston	Elizabeth	
1968 (17th)	Vilma Santos	Kasalanan Kaya?	
1969 (18th)
1969 (18th)	Eva Darren‡	Ang Pulubi	
1969 (18th)	Anita Linda	Bimbo	
1969 (18th)	Carina Afable	Dugo ng Bayani	
1969 (18th)	Lourdes Medel	Adriana	
1969 (18th)	Matimtiman Cruz	Kapatid Ko ang Aking Ina	

=== 1970s ===
Year	Actress	Film	Role
1970 (19th)
1970 (19th)	Hilda Koronel‡	Santiago	
1970 (19th)	Caridad Sanchez	Wanted: Perfect Mother	
1970 (19th)	Diana Dean	My Little Angel	
1970 (19th)	Linda Martin	Psycho Sex Killer	
1971 (20th)
1971 (20th)	Marissa Delgado‡	Lumuha Pati Mga Anghel	
1971 (20th)	Caridad Sanchez	Stardoom	
1971 (20th)	Paraluman	Lilet	
1971 (20th)	Rosanna Ortiz	Ang Kampana sa Santa Quiteria	
1971 (20th)	Tita Muñoz	Lilet	
1971 (20th)	Zenaida Amador	Pagdating sa Dulo	
1972 (21st)
1972 (21st)	Marissa Delgado‡	Till Death Do Us Part	
1972 (21st)	Alicia Alonzo	Villa Miranda	
1972 (21st)	Chichay	Bilangguang Puso	
1972 (21st)	Cristina Reyes	Sukdulan	
1972 (21st)	Ely Roque	Tatay Na si Erap	
1972 (21st)	Mary Walter	Babae... Ikaw ang Dahilan	
1972 (21st)	Zenaida Amador	Kill the Pushers	
1973 (22nd)
1973 (22nd)	Suzette Ranillo‡	Gimingaw Ako	
1973 (22nd)	Anna Gonzales	Lupang Kayumanggi	
1973 (22nd)	Caridad Sanchez	Lupang Hinirang	
1973 (22nd)	Lotis Key	Dalawang Mukha ng Tagumpay	
1973 (22nd)	Pinky de Leon	Tanikalang Dugo	
1973 (22nd)	Rosemarie Gil	Florinda	
1974 (23rd)
1974 (23rd)	Anita Linda‡	Tatlo, Dalawa, Isa	
1974 (23rd)	Anna Gonzales	Manila Connection	
1974 (23rd)	Babsy Paredes	Ang Pinakamagandang Hayop sa Balat ng Lupa	
1974 (23rd)	Laurice Guillen	Tinimbang Ka Ngunit Kulang	Milagros
1974 (23rd)	Marianne dela Riva	Krimen: Kayo ang Humatol	
1974 (23rd)	Marissa Delgado	Isang Gabi... Tatlong Babae	
1974 (23rd)	Mary Walter	Alaala Mo, Daigdig Ko	
1974 (23rd)	Rosanna Ortiz	Batingaw	
1975 (24th)
1975 (24th)	Anna Gonzales‡	Sa Kagubatan ng Lunsod	
1975 (24th)	Gloria Sevilla	Banaue: Stairway to the Sky	
1975 (24th)	Lily Gamboa Mendoza	Maynila sa Kuko ng Liwanag	Perla
1975 (24th)	Paraluman	Mister Mo, Lover Boy Ko	
1975 (24th)	Rosanna Ortiz	Alaala Mo, Daigdig Ko	
1976 (25th)
1976 (25th)	Mona Lisa‡	Insiang	
1976 (25th)	Anita Linda	Mrs. Teresa Abad... Ako Po si Bing	
1976 (25th)	Gloria Sevilla	Minsa'y Isang Gamu-gamo	Chedeng de la Cruz
1976 (25th)	Laurice Guillen	Lunes, Martes, Miyerkules, Huwebes, Biyernes, Sabado, Linggo	
1976 (25th)	Perla Bautista	Minsa'y isang Gamu-gamo	Yolanda Santos
1977 (26th)
1977 (26th)	Armida Siguion-Reyna‡	Tahan na Empoy, Tahan	
1977 (26th)	Dexter Doria	Inay	Becky
1977 (26th)	Liza Lorena	Walang Katapusang Tag-araw	
1977 (26th)	Olivia Sanchez	Bakya Mo Neneng	Neneng
1977 (26th)	Rosemarie Gil	Burlesk Queen	Virgie Nite
1978 (27th)
1978 (27th)	Angie Ferro‡	Pagputi ng Uwak, Pag-itim ng Tagak	Miguela Monserrat
1978 (27th)	Amy Austria	Atsay	Linda
1978 (27th)	Anita Linda	Mahal Mo, Mahal Ko	
1978 (27th)	Laurice Guillen	Gumising Ka, Maruja	Cristy
1978 (27th)	Marissa Delgado	Ang Tatay Kong Nanay	Mariana Jimenez
1979 (28th)
1979 (28th)	Perla Bautista‡	Ang Alamat ni Julian Makabayan	
1979 (28th)	Laurice Guillen	Init	Idad
1979 (28th)	Rebecca Gonzales	Kasal-kasalan, Bahay-bahayan	
1979 (28th)	Rita Gomez	Salawahan	Marianne David
1979 (28th)	Rustica Carpio	Menor de Edad	

=== 1980s ===
Year	Actress	Film	Role
1980 (29th)
1980 (29th)	Perla Bautista‡	Nang Bumuka Ang Sampaguita	
1980 (29th)	Armida Siguion-Reyna	Pag-ibig na Walang Dangal	
1980 (29th)	Gina Alajar	Brutal	Cynthia
1980 (29th)	Rita Gomez	Tanikala	
1980 (29th)	Suzette Ranillo	Taga sa Panahon	
1981 (30th)
1981 (30th)	Chanda Romero‡	Karma	Cristy
1981 (30th)	Anita Linda	Bakit Bughaw ang Langit	Sofia
1981 (30th)	Armida Siguion-Reyna	Salome	
1981 (30th)	Charito Solis	Kisapmata	Adelina Carandang
1981 (30th)	Deborah Sun	Pakawalan Mo Ako	Bambi
1981 (30th)	Odette Khan	Kahit Ako'y Lupa	
1981 (30th)	Rosemarie Gil	Dear Heart	Sylvia
1982 (31st)
1982 (31st)	Sandy Andolong‡	Moral	Sylvia
1982 (31st)	Alicia Alonzo	Bambang	
1982 (31st)	Cecille Castillo	Cain at Abel	Rina
1982 (31st)	Cherie Gil	Oro, Plata, Mata	Trining Ojeda
1982 (31st)	Gigi Dueñas	Himala	Nimia
1982 (31st)	Perla Bautista	In This Corner	Laura
1982 (31st)	Rio Locsin	Haplos	Auring
1983 (32nd)
1983 (32nd)	Maricel Soriano‡	Saan Darating ang Umaga?	Shayne Rodrigo
1983 (32nd)	Alicia Alonzo	Bago Kumalat ang Kamandag	
1983 (32nd)	Armida Siguion-Reyna	Paano Ba ang Mangarap?	Senyora Francia
1983 (32nd)	Celia Rodriguez	Ang Boyfriend Kong Kano	
1983 (32nd)	Grace Amilbangsa	Karnal	Doray
1983 (32nd)	Julie Vega	Isang Bala Ka Lang	Angela Rodriguez
1983 (32nd)	Liza Lorena	Don't Cry for Me, Papa	Aida
1984 (33rd)
1984 (33rd)	Perla Bautista‡	Bulaklak sa City Jail	Viring
1984 (33rd)	Bella Flores	Mga Batang Yagit	
1984 (33rd)	Caridad Sanchez	Baby Tsina	Nena
1984 (33rd)	Gina Alajar	Kaya Kong Abutin ang Langit	Nancy Rosales
1984 (33rd)	Gina Pareño	Bukas Luluhod ang Mga Tala	Fidela Rios
1984 (33rd)	Gloria Romero	Condemned	Connie
1984 (33rd)	Laurice Guillen	Sister Stella L.	Sister Stella Bautista
1985 (34th)
1985 (34th)	Dina Bonnevie‡	Tinik sa Dibdib	Corazon
1985 (34th)	Amy Austria	Hinugot sa Langit	Estella
1985 (34th)	Angie Ferro	Isla	Lola Gare
1985 (34th)	Caridad Sanchez	Ano ang Kulay ng Mukha ng Diyos	Aling Celing
1985 (34th)	Charito Solis	Moises Padilla Story: The Missing Chapter	
1985 (34th)	Cherie Gil	God Save Me!	
1985 (34th)	Liza Lorena	Pahiram ng Ligaya	
1986 (35th)
1986 (35th)	Nida Blanca‡	Magdusa Ka!	Aling Toyang
1986 (35th)	Chanda Romero	Agaw Armas	Lucy
1986 (35th)	Dina Bonnevie	Palimos ng Pag-ibig	Ditas
1986 (35th)	Donna Villa	Paano Hahatiin ang Puso	
1986 (35th)	Lani Mercado	Blusang Itim	Cleo
1986 (35th)	Lorna Tolentino	Nakagapos na Puso	Elisa Fajardo
1986 (35th)	Rio Locsin	Huwag Mo Kaming Isumpa	Aileen
1987 (36th)
1987 (36th)	Nida Blanca‡	Kid Huwag Kang Susuko	
1987 (36th)	Dina Bonnevie	Maging Akin Ka Lamang	Elsa Abrigo
1987 (36th)	Gloria Romero	Saan Nagtatago ang Pag-ibig?	Carmen
1987 (36th)	Jackie Lou Blanco	Kung Aagawin Mo ang Lahat sa Akin	Gladys Andrada
1987 (36th)	Snooky Serna	Paano Kung Wala Ka Na	Ampy
1988 (37th)
1988 (37th)	Gloria Romero‡	Nagbabagang Luha	Mrs. Montaire
1988 (37th)	Armida Siguion-Reyna	Hati Tayo sa Magdamag	
1988 (37th)	Gina Alajar	Babaeng Hampaslupa	Desiree
1988 (37th)	Gina Pareño	Natutulog Pa ang Diyos	Patria Ramirez
1988 (37th)	Marissa Delgado	Sa Akin Pa Rin ang Bukas	Señora Beatrice Villacorta
1988 (37th)	Nida Blanca	Ibulong Mo sa Diyos	
1988 (37th)	Perla Bautista	Anak ng Cabron	
1989 (38th)
1989 (38th)	Cherie Gil‡	Ang Bukas ay Akin! (Langit ang Uusig)	Mirriam
1989 (38th)	Dawn Zulueta	Bakit Iisa Lamang ang Puso?	Diana
1989 (38th)	Gloria Romero	Bilangin ang Bituin sa Langit	Doña Martina
1989 (38th)	Helen Gamboa	Kailan Mahuhugasan ang Kasalanan?	Adora Meneses
1989 (38th)	Hilda Koronel	Babangon Ako't Dudurugin Kita	Via
1989 (38th)	Jaclyn Jose	Macho Dancer	Bambi
1989 (38th)	Rosa Rosal	Ang Lahat ng Ito Pati na ang Langit	

=== 1990s ===
Year	Actress	Film	Role
1990 (39th)
1990 (39th)	Gina Alajar‡	Biktima	Laura Malicat
1990 (39th)	Charo Santos	Gumapang Ka sa Lusak	Rowena Guatlo
1990 (39th)	Janice de Belen	Bakit Kay Tagal ng Sandali?	Lolit
1990 (39th)	Lani Mercado	My Other Woman	
1990 (39th)	Snooky Serna	Hahamakin Lahat	Teresa
1991 (40th)
1991 (40th)	Dawn Zulueta‡	Una Kang Naging Akin	Vanessa
1991 (40th)	Armida Siguion-Reyna	Ang Totoong Buhay ni Pacita M.	Mrs. Estrella
1991 (40th)	Jackie Lou Blanco	Hihintayin Kita sa Langit	Sandra
1991 (40th)	Pilar Pilapil	Darna	Valentina
1991 (40th)	Rina Reyes	Class of '91	Sally
1992 (41st)
1992 (41st)	Maricel Laxa‡	Iisa Pa Lamang	Betina
1992 (41st)	Aiko Melendez	Sinungaling Mong Puso	Anna
1992 (41st)	Cherie Gil	Ngayon at Kailanman	Donna Benitez
1992 (41st)	Maritoni Fernandez	Stella Magtanggol	Wendy
1992 (41st)	Nanette Medved	Narito ang Puso Ko	Suzette
1993 (42nd)
1993 (42nd)	Sharmaine Arnaiz‡	Saan Ka Man Naroroon	Cita
1993 (42nd)	Amy Austria	Kung Mawawala Ka Pa	Sylvia
1993 (42nd)	Boots Anson-Roa	May Minamahal	Becky
1993 (42nd)	Charo Santos	Ms. Dolora X	
1993 (42nd)	Monique Wilson	Kapag Iginuhit ang Hatol ng Puso	Lally
1994 (43rd)
1994 (43rd)	Caridad Sanchez‡	Maalaala Mo Kaya: The Movie	Nena
1994 (43rd)	Bing Loyzaga	Anghel na Walang Langit	Flor Cornejo
1994 (43rd)	Boots Anson-Roa	The Maggie dela Riva Story (God... Why Me?)	
1994 (43rd)	Maricel Laxa	Ang Ika-Labing Isang Utos: Mahalin Mo, Asawa Mo	Sylvia
1994 (43rd)	Nida Blanca	Vampira	Nena
1995 (44th)
1995 (44th)	Armida Siguion-Reyna‡	Inagaw Mo ang Lahat sa Akin	Almeda
1995 (44th)	Caridad Sanchez	Kahit Butas ng Karayom… Papasukin Ko	Tinay
1995 (44th)	Donna Cruz	Muling Umawit ang Puso	Noemi
1995 (44th)	Jaclyn Jose	The Flor Contemplacion Story	Ellen
1995 (44th)	Maila Gumila	Dahas	Minnie
1996 (45th)
1996 (45th)	Gina Alajar‡	Mulanay: Sa Pusod ng Paraiso	
1996 (45th)	Carmina Villarroel	Bayarang Puso	Christine Sanvictores
1996 (45th)	Dawn Zulueta	Bakit May Kahapon Pa?	Leah
1996 (45th)	Gina Pareño	Magic Temple	Telang Bayawak
1996 (45th)	Ruby Moreno	Segurista	Ruby Dimagiba
1997 (46th)
1997 (46th)	Isabel Granada‡	Ligaya ang Itawag Mo sa Akin	Estela
1997 (46th)	Elizabeth Oropesa	Milagros	Miding
1997 (46th)	Judy Ann Santos	Nasaan ang Puso	Ria
1997 (46th)	Maricel Laxa	Minsan Lamang Magmamahal	Sandra
1997 (46th)	Nida Blanca	Babae	Lola Adora
1998 (47th)
1998 (47th)	Anita Linda‡	Babae sa Bubungang Lata	Amapola
1998 (47th)	Chin Chin Gutierrez	Ama Namin	Ka Riza
1998 (47th)	Gloria Diaz	Jose Rizal	Teodora Alonso
1998 (47th)	Jennifer Sevilla	Kay Tagal Kang Hinintay	Sandy
1998 (47th)	Jolina Magdangal	Puso ng Pasko	Merry
1999 (48th)
1999 (48th)	Glydel Mercado‡	Sidhi	Mayang
1999 (48th)	Angelu de Leon	Bulaklak ng Maynila	Ada
1999 (48th)	Jaclyn Jose	Mula sa Puso	Magda
1999 (48th)	Jennifer Sevilla	Kahapon, May Dalawang Bata	Daling
1999 (48th)	Maricel Laxa	Higit Pa sa Buhay Ko	Sally Jasminez

=== 2000s ===
Year	Actress	Film	Role
2000 (49th)
2000 (49th)	Alessandra de Rossi‡	Azucena	Lily
2000 (49th)	Angel Aquino	Laro sa Baga	Carmen
2000 (49th)	Angelu de Leon	Abandonada	Cindy
2000 (49th)	G. Toengi	Tunay na Mahal	Moira
2000 (49th)	Gina Alajar	Yakapin Mo ang Umaga	Teresing
2001 (50th)
2001 (50th)	Caridad Sanchez‡	Bagong Buwan	Bae Farida
2002 (51st)
2002 (51st)	Kris Aquino‡	Mano Po	Juliet Go - Co
2002 (51st)	Amy Austria	Mano Po	Linda Go - de la Madrid
2002 (51st)	Boots Anson-Roa	Mano Po	Elisa Malimban - Go
2002 (51st)	Cherry Pie Picache	American Adobo	Tere
2002 (51st)	Gina Alajar	Mano Po	Gina Chua - Go
2003 (52nd)
2003 (52nd)	Celia Rodriguez‡	Magnifico	Ka Doring
2003 (52nd)	Alessandra de Rossi	The Cory Quirino Kidnap: NBI Files	Helen
2003 (52nd)	Aiza Marquez	Noon at Ngayon	Bernadette
2003 (52nd)	Hilda Koronel	Crying Ladies	Rhoda "Aling Doray" Rivera
2003 (52nd)	Maui Taylor	Ang Huling Birhen sa Lupa	Cion
2004 (53rd)
2004 (53rd)	Aleck Bovick‡	Naglalayag	Rica
2004 (53rd)	Angelu de Leon	Aishite Imasu 1941	Maura
2004 (53rd)	Sunshine Dizon	Sabel	Toni
2005 (54th)
2005 (54th)	Gloria Diaz‡	Nasaan Ka Man	Lilia
2005 (54th)	Alessandra de Rossi	Kutob	Mayen
2005 (54th)	Cherry Pie Picache	Ako Legal Wife: Mano Po 4	Patty
2005 (54th)	Hilda Koronel	Nasaan Ka Man	Trining
2005 (54th)	Sunshine Dizon	Mulawin: The Movie	Pirena
2006 (55th)
2006 (55th)	Gina Pareño‡	Kasal, Kasali, Kasalo	Belita
2006 (55th)	Liza Lorena	Barang	Nana Ursula
2006 (55th)	Maja Salvador	Sukob	Joya
2006 (55th)	Rio Locsin	Don't Give Up on Us	Teresa
2006 (55th)	Tetchie Agbayani	Close to You	Lance's mother
2007 (56th)
2007 (56th)	Irma Adlawan‡	Ataul: For Rent	Aling Carmen
2007 (56th)	Angel Aquino	Faces of Love	
2007 (56th)	Dimples Romana	One More Chance	Krizzy
2007 (56th)	Eugene Domingo	Paano Kita Iibigin	Liwayway
2007 (56th)	Gina Pareño	Sakal, Sakali, Saklolo	Belita
2008 (57th)
2008 (57th)	Snooky Serna‡	Paupahan	Lucinda Querubin
2008 (57th)	Boots Anson-Roa	When Love Begins	Marietta Caballero
2008 (57th)	Gina Pareño	Ploning	Intang
2008 (57th)	Jean Garcia	Walang Kawala	Beng
2008 (57th)	Maria Isabel Lopez	Ay Ayeng	
2008 (57th)	Pilar Pilapil	For the First Time	Sylvia Villaraza
2009 (58th)
2009 (58th)	Gloria Diaz‡	Sagrada Familia	Lupe Cabio
2009 (58th)	Dimples Romana	Love Me Again (Land Down Under)	Yna Zarate
2009 (58th)	Gina Alajar	Dukot	Mabel Dismun
2009 (58th)	Heart Evangelista	Mano Po 6: A Mother's Love	Stephanie Uy
2009 (58th)	Manilyn Reynes	Ded na si Lolo	Charing Adanza
2009 (58th)	Miriam Quiambao	Kimmy Dora: Kambal sa Kiyeme	Gertrude
2009 (58th)	Rhian Ramos	Ang Panday	Emelita Bangge

=== 2010s ===
Year	Actress	Film	Role
2010 (59th)
2010 (59th)	Eugene Domingo‡	Here Comes the Bride	Precy
2010 (59th)	Eugene Domingo	Ang Tanging Ina Mo: Last na 'To!	Rowena
2010 (59th)	Gina Pareño	Dalaw	Olga
2010 (59th)	Shaina Magdayao	Sa 'yo Lamang	Karen
2010 (59th)	Zsa Zsa Padilla	Sigwa	Sita
2011 (60th)
2011 (60th)	Angelica Panganiban‡	Segunda Mano	Mariella
2011 (60th)	Carmi Martin	In the Name of Love	Chloe Evelino
2011 (60th)	Carmi Martin	No Other Woman	Babygirl Dela Costa
2011 (60th)	Carmina Villarroel	The Road	Carmela
2011 (60th)	Daria Ramirez	A Mother's Story	Choleng
2011 (60th)	Iza Calzado	Ang Panday 2	Maria
2011 (60th)	Valerie Concepcion	Manila Kingpin: The Asiong Salonga Story	Mely
2012 (61st)
2012 (61st)	Jaclyn Jose‡	A Secret Affair	Ellen Delgado
2012 (61st)	Carmina Villarroel	One More Try	Dr. Diesta Gimeno
2012 (61st)	Chynna Ortaleza	Migrante	Lisa Marasigan
2012 (61st)	Hilda Koronel	The Mistress	Regina Torres
2012 (61st)	Kim Chiu	The Healing	Cookie Limguangco
2013 (62nd)
2013 (62nd)	Bela Padilla‡	10,000 Hours	Maya Limchauco
2013 (62nd)	Aiza Seguerra	My Little Bossings	Ice
2013 (62nd)	Angel Aquino	On the Job	Lulette
2013 (62nd)	Cherie Gil	A Moment in Time	Karen Linden
2013 (62nd)	Coney Reyes	Four Sisters and A Wedding	Grace Salazar
2013 (62nd)	Gloria Sevilla	Boy Golden: Shoot to Kill, the Arturo Porcuna Story	Aling Puring
2014 (63rd)
2014 (63rd)	Sylvia Sanchez‡	The Trial	Sampi Jimenez
2014 (63rd)	Carmi Martin	Feng Shui 2	Ruby Anonuevo
2014 (63rd)	Chanel Latorre	Magkakabaung	Neri
2014 (63rd)	Dawn Zulueta	She's Dating the Gangster	Athena Dizon
2014 (63rd)	Iza Calzado	Starting Over Again	Patricia "Patty" de Guia
2014 (63rd)	Jasmine Curtis-Smith	Bonifacio: Ang Unang Pangulo	Andrea
2014 (63rd)	Rita de Guzman	Asintado	Lani
2014 (63rd)	Rosanna Roces	Hustisya	Vivian
2014 (63rd)	Sunshine Dizon	Kamkam	Evelyn
2015 (64th)
2015 (64th)	Lorna Tolentino‡	Crazy Beautiful You	Dra. Leah Serrano
2015 (64th)	Angel Jacob	Silong	Caroline
2015 (64th)	Bea Saw	A Second Chance	Angeline "Anj" Tan
2015 (64th)	Cecile Yumul	Ari: My Life With A King	Miding
2015 (64th)	Julia Barretto	Para sa Hopeless Romantic	Maria Kristina Lapuz
2015 (64th)	Roxanne Barcelo	Tragic Theater	Arlene de Lara
2015 (64th)	Ysabelle Peach	Angela Markado	Digna
2016 (65th)
2016 (65th)	Liza Diño‡	Ringgo: The Dog Shooter	Alva
2016 (65th)	Aiko Melendez	Barcelona: A Love Untold	Insiang
2016 (65th)	Dimples Romana	The Unmarried Wife	Carmela
2016 (65th)	Marielle Therese	Ku'te	Lenlen
2016 (65th)	Meg Imperial	Higanti	Jean
2017 (66th)
2017 (66th)	Odette Khan‡	Bar Boys	Justice Hernandez
2017 (66th)	Adrienne Vergara	Bliss	Rose / Lilibeth
2017 (66th)	Angeli Nicole Sanoy	Bomba	Dora
2017 (66th)	Chai Fonacier	Respeto	Betchay
2017 (66th)	Cristine Reyes	Seven Sundays	Cha Bonifacio
2017 (66th)	Irma Adlawan	What Home Feels Like	Jenny
2017 (66th)	Thea Yrastorza	Respeto	Connie
2017 (66th)	Yayo Aguila	Kiko Boksingero	Diday
2018 (67th)
2018 (67th)	Adrienne Vergara‡	Dog Days	
2018 (67th)	Agot Isidro	How She Left Me	Elly
2018 (67th)	Bituin Escalante	Season of the Devil	Kwentista
2018 (67th)	Cherie Gil	Citizen Jake	
2018 (67th)	Cielo Aquino	Billie and Emma	
2018 (67th)	Daria Ramirez	Signal Rock	Alicia Abakan
2018 (67th)	Hazel Orencio	Season of the Devil	Teniente
2018 (67th)	Mary Joy Apostol	Hospicio	Karla
2018 (67th)	Pinky Amador	Season of the Devil	Kwago
2018 (67th)	Shaina Magdayao	Season of the Devil	Lorena Haniway
2019 (68th)
2019 (68th)	Dolly de Leon ‡	Verdict	Elsa
2019 (68th)	Cherie Gil	Kaputol	Kiki
2019 (68th)	Ella Cruz	Edward	Agnes
2019 (68th)	Meryll Soriano	John Denver Trending	Marites Cabungcal
2019 (68th)	Yayo Aguila	Metamorphosis	Elena

=== 2020s ===
Year	Actress	Film	Role
2020 (69th)
2020 (69th)	Dexter Doria ‡	Memories of Forgetting	Yvonne
2020 (69th)	Angeli Bayani	Watch List	
2020 (69th)	Carmina Villaroel	Four Sisters Before the Wedding	Grace Salazar
2020 (69th)	Dimples Romana	Block Z	Beth
2020 (69th)	Rhen Escaño	Untrue	Ana Villanueva
2020 (69th)	Sanya Lopez	Isa Pang Bahaghari	Dolly
2020 (69th)	Shaina Magdayao	Tagpuan	Tanya
2021 (70th)
2021 (70th)	Janice de Belen ‡	Big Night!	Melba
2021 (70th)	Adelle Ibarrientos	Katips	Alet
2021 (70th)	Eugene Domingo	Big Night!	Madam
2021 (70th)	Luz Valdez	My Amanda	Inang
2021 (70th)	Rans Rifol	Kun Maupay Man It Panahon	Andrea
2021 (70th)	Shella Mae Romualdo	Arisaka	Nawi
2022 (71st)
2022 (71st)	Nikki Valdez ‡	Family Matters	Ellen
2022 (71st)	Louise delos Reyes	Deleter	Aileen
2022 (71st)	Mylene Dizon	Family Matters	Fortune
2022 (71st)	Nour Hooshmand	Blue Room	
2022 (71st)	OJ Arci	La Traidora	Bubbles
2023 (72nd)
2023 (72nd)	Gloria Diaz ‡	Mallari	Doña Facunda Mallari
2023 (72nd)	Alessandra de Rossi	Firefly	Mariela "Elay" Alvaro
2023 (72nd)	Dolly de Leon	A Very Good Girl	Molly "Mother" Suzara
2023 (72nd)	Gina Alajar	Pieta	Beth
2023 (72nd)	Liza Diño-Seguerra	Papa Mascot	Debbie
2023 (72nd)	Ruby Ruiz	Monday First Screening	Deborah
2024 (73rd)
2024 (73rd)	Nadine Lustre ‡	Uninvited	Nicolette Chantal "Nicole" Remegio Vega
2024 (73rd)	Alessandra de Rossi	Green Bones	Betty
2024 (73rd)	Claudine Barretto	When Magic Hurts	
2024 (73rd)	Eugene Domingo	And the Breadwinner Is...	Baby Salvador
2024 (73rd)	Isabelle Sophie Ng	Her Locket	Young Jewel Ouyang
2024 (73rd)	Mylene Dizon	The Hearing	Madonna

== Multiple wins and nominations ==
The following individuals won two or more FAMAS Awards for Best Supporting Actress:

Wins	Actor	Nominations	First Win	Latest Win
3	Celia Rodriguez	4	Kulay Dugo ang Gabi (1964)	Magnifico (2003)
3	Gloria Diaz	4	Nasaan Ka Man (2005)	Mallari (2023)
3	Marlene Dauden	4	Anino ni Bathala (1958)	Sapagkat Kami'y Tao Lamang (1963)
3	Nida Blanca	6	Korea (1952)	Kid Huwag Kang Susuko (1987)
3	Perla Bautista	6	Ang Alamat ni Julian Makabayan (1979)	Bulaklak sa City Jail (1984)
2	Anita Linda	6	Tatlo, Dalawa, Isa (1974)	Babae sa Bubungang Lata (1998)
2	Armida Siguion-Reyna	7	Tahan na Empoy, Tahan (1977)	Inagaw Mo ang Lahat sa Akin (1995)
2	Caridad Sanchez	11	Maalaala Mo Kaya: The Movie (1994)	Bagong Buwan (2001)
2	Gina Alajar	9	Biktima (1990)	Mulanay: Sa Pusod ng Paraiso (1996)
2	Marissa Delgado	5	Lumuha Pati mga Anghel (1971)	Til Death Do Us Part (1972)

The following individuals received four or more Best Supporting Actress nominations:

Nominations	Actor	First Nomination	Latest Nomination
11	Caridad Sanchez	Magtiis Ka, Darling (1963)	Bagong Buwan (2001)
9	Gina Alajar	Brutal (1980)	Pieta (2023)
7	Armida Siguion-Reyna	Tahan na Empoy, Tahan (1977)	Inagaw Mo ang Lahat sa Akin (1995)
7	Cherie Gil	Oro, Plata, Mata (1982)	Kaputol (2019)
7	Gina Pareño	Bukas Luluhod ang Mga Tala (1984)	Dalaw (2010)
7	Gloria Sevilla	Madugong Paghihiganti (1962)	Boy Golden: Shoot to Kill (2013)
7	Mary Walter	Krus na Daan (1960)	Alaala Mo, Daigdig Ko (1974)
7	Rosa Mia	Rosanna (1955)	Liku-likong Landas (1968)
6	Anita Linda	Bimbo (1969)	Babae sa Bubungang Lata (1998)
6	Bella Flores	Busabos (1957)	Mga Batang Yagit (1984)
6	Nida Blanca	Korea (1952)	Babae (1997)
6	Perla Bautista	Minsa'y Isang Gamu-gamo (1976)	Anak ng Cabron (1988)
5	Alessandra de Rossi	Azucena (2000)	Green Bones (2024)
5	Eugene Domingo	Paano Kita Iibigin (2007)	And the Breadwinner Is... (2024)
5	Hilda Koronel	Santiago (1970)	The Mistress (2012)
5	Laurice Guillen	Tinimbang Ka Ngunit Kulang (1974)	Sister Stella L. (1984)
5	Marissa Delgado	Lumuha Pati mga Anghel (1971)	Sa Akin Pa Rin ang Bukas (1988)
4	Amy Austria	Atsay (1978)	Mano Po (2002)
4	Boots Anson-Roa	May Minamahal (1993)	When Love Begins (2008)
4	Carmina Villarroel	Bayarang Puso (1996)	Four Sisters Before the Wedding (2020)
4	Carol Varga	Habang Buhay (1953)	Akin ang Paghihiganti (1960)
4	Celia Rodriguez	Kulay Dugo ang Gabi (1964)	Magnifico (2003)
4	Dawn Zulueta	Bakit Iisa Lamang ang Puso? (1989)	She's Dating the Gangster (2014)
4	Dimples Romana	One More Chance (2007)	Block Z (2020)
4	Gloria Diaz	Jose Rizal (1998)	Mallari (2023)
4	Gloria Romero	Condemned (1984)	Bilangin ang Bituin sa Langit (1989)
4	Jaclyn Jose	Macho Dancer (1989)	A Secret Affair (2012)
4	Liza Lorena	Walang Katapusang Tag-araw (1977)	Barang (2006)
4	Maricel Laxa	Iisa Pa Lamang (1992)	Higit Pa sa Buhay Ko (1999)
4	Marlene Dauden	Talipandas (1958)	Sapagkat Kami'y Tao Lamang (1963)
4	Rosa Aguirre	Ulilang Bituin (1956)	Mahal Kita Inay (1962)
