= 1965 FAMAS Awards =

Annual Filipino film awards ceremony

13th FAMAS Awards
- Date: 1965
- Site: Philippines

Highlights
- Best Picture: Geron Busabos, Ang Batang Quiapo (Emar Pictures)
- Most awards: Geron Busabos, Ang Batang Quiapo (4 wins)

The 13th Filipino Academy of Movie Arts and Sciences Awards Night was held 1n 1965 for the Outstanding Achievements for the year 1964.

Geron Busabos, Ang Batang Quiapo of Emar Pictures and starred by Joseph Estrada was the most awarded film of the 13th FAMAS Awards with 4 including the most coveted award the FAMAS Award for Best Picture.

== Awards ==
=== Major Awards ===
Winners are listed first and highlighted with boldface.

Best Picture	Best Director
**Geron Busabos: Ang batang Quiapo — Emar Pictures**; Kulay dugo ang gabi — Peoples Pictures; Sa Bawat Pintig ng Puso — Larry Santiago Productions; Salambao — Zultana International	**Lamberto V. Avellana — Scout Rangers**; Cesar Gallardo — Geron Busabos: Ang batang Quiapo; Gerardo de Leon — Kulay Dugo ang Gabi; Pablo Santiago — Kumander Fidela; Armando De Guzman — Sa Bawat Pintig ng Puso; Ding M. De Jesus — Salambao
Best Actor	Best Actress
**Joseph Estrada — Geron Busabos: Ang batang Quiapo**; Ronald Remy — Kulay dugo ang Gabi; Zaldy Zshornack — Sa bawat pintig ng puso; Eddie Rodriguez — Salambao; Willie Sotelo — Scout Rangers	**Marlene Daudén — Sa Bawat Pintig ng Puso**; Lolita Rodriguez — Andres Bonifacio: Ang Supremo; Amalia Fuentes — Kulay Dugo ang Gabi; Charito Solis — Lagablab sa Maribojoc; Vilma Valera — Salambao
Best Supporting Actor	Best Supporting Actress
**Oscar Roncal — Lagblab sa Maribojoc**; Martin Marfil — Gahasan; Berting Labra — Lumuluhang Komiko; Eddie Garcia — Markong Bagsik; Tony Santos — Scout Rangers	**Celia Rodriguez — Kulay Dugo ang Gabi**; Leni Trinidad — Geron Busabos: Ang batang Quiapo; Maggie Dela Riva — Lagblab sa Maribojoc; Alona Alegre — Sa Bawat Pintig ng Puso; Caridad Sanchez — Scout Rangers
Best in Screenplay	Best Story
**Augusto Buenaventura — Geron Busabos: Ang batang Quiapo**	**Augusto Buenaventura — Geron Busabos: Ang batang Quiapo**
Best Sound Engineering	Best Musical Score
**Flaviano Villareal — Sa Bawa't Pintig Ng Puso**	**Restie Umali— Sa bawat pintig ng Puso**
Best Cinematography	Best Editing
**Arsenio Doña — Geron Busabos: Ang batang Quiapo**	**Gervacio Santos — Scout Rangers**
Best Child Performer	
**Boy Alvarez — Geron Busabos: Ang batang Quiapo**	—
