= 1955 FAMAS Awards =

Annual Filipino film awards ceremony

3rd FAMAS Awards
- Date: 1955
- Site: Fiesta Pavilion, Manila Hotel

The 3rd Filipino Academy of Movie Arts and Sciences Awards Night was held in 1955 at Fiesta Pavilion in Manila Hotel.

Salabusab, by Premiere Productions, Inc., is the recipient of this edition's FAMAS Award for Best Picture.

== Awards ==
=== Major Awards ===
Winners are listed first and highlighted with boldface.

Best Picture	Best Director
**Salabusab — LVN Pictures**	**Cesar Gallardo — Salabusab**
Best Actor	Best Actress
**Fred Montilla — Bondying**	**Gloria Romero — Dalagang Ilocana**; Lolita Rodriguez — Jack and Jill; Lilia Dizon — Kandelerong Pilak; Nida Blanca — Waray-waray
Best Supporting Actor	Best Supporting Actress
**Ruben Rustia — Pedro Penduko**	**Carol Varga — Guwapo**
Best Editing	Best Cinematography
**Jose Tarnate — Bondying**	**Felipe Sacdalan — May Bakas ang Lumipas**
Best Sound Engineering	Best Musical Score
**July P. Hidalgo — Kandelerong Pilak**	**Tony Maiquez — Guwapo**
