= FAMAS Award for Best Picture =

Award presented annually by the Filipino Academy of Movie Arts and Sciences

- Awarded for: Best Picture of the Year
- Country: Philippines
- Presented by: Filipino Academy of Movie Arts and Sciences Award
- First award: 1953
- Currently held by: In Thy Name (2025)

The FAMAS Award for Best Picture is one of the FAMAS Awards, awards given to people working in the motion picture industry by the Filipino Academy of Movie Arts and Sciences Award, which are voted on by Palanca Award-winning writers and movie columnists, writers and people in the film industry (directors, actors, producers, technicians, crew etc.). The Best Picture FAMAS has always been considered the most important and top prize, and has been awarded by Filipino Academy of Movie Arts and Sciences ever since the first ceremony in 1953.

The FAMAS Award winner for Best Picture is usually the most prestigious selection of the best Filipino motion picture of the year. The FAMAS Best Pictures are held in high regard as the FAMAS is the equivalent of the Academy Awards in the Philippines.

== Winners and nominees ==
In the lists below, the winner of the award for each year is shown first, followed by the other nominees.

=== 1950s ===
Year	Film	Film Studio
1952 (1st)
1952 (1st)	Ang Sawa Sa Lumang Simboryo	Premiere Productions, Inc.
1952 (1st)	Bagong Umaga	Premiere Productions, Inc.
1952 (1st)	Basahang Ginto	Sampaguita Pictures
1952 (1st)	Korea	LVN Pictures
1953 (2nd)
1953 (2nd)	Huk Sa Bagong Pamumuhay	LVN Pictures
1954 (3rd)
1954 (3rd)	Salabusab	Premiere Productions, Inc.
1955 (4th)
1955 (4th)	Higit Sa Lahat	LVN Pictures
1955 (4th)	Dakilang Hudas	People's Pictures
1955 (4th)	Paltik	People's Pictures
1955 (4th)	Rosana	Sampaguita Pictures
1955 (4th)	Sonny Boy	LVN Pictures
1956 (5th)
1956 (5th)	Luksang Tagumpay	LVN Pictures
1956 (5th)	Ang Buhay at Pag-Ibig ni Dr. Jose Rizal	Bagumbayan Productions and Balatbat Productions
1956 (5th)	Desperado	People's Pictures and Premiere Productions, Inc.
1956 (5th)	Hokus Pokus	Premiere Productions, Inc.
1956 (5th)	Kumander 13	LVN Pictures
1957 (6th)
1957 (6th)	Kalibre .45	Premiere Productions Inc.
1957 (6th)	Kamay ni Cain	People's Pictures
1957 (6th)	Krisalis	LVN Pictures
1957 (6th)	Sino Ang Maysala?	Vera-Perez Productions, Inc.
1957 (6th)	Veronica	Sampaguita Pictures
1958 (7th)
1958 (7th)	Hanggang Sa Dulo Ng Daigdig	Pacific Movie Productions
1958 (7th)	Alaalang Banal	Vera-Perez Productions
1958 (7th)	Anak Ng Lasengga	People's Pictures
1958 (7th)	Bobby	Sampaguita Pictures
1958 (7th)	Condenado	Sampaguita Pictures
1958 (7th)	Laban Sa Lahat	Premiere Productions Inc.
1958 (7th)	Singing Idol	People's Pictures
1958 (7th)	Talipandas	Sampaguita Pictures
1958 (7th)	Venganza	LVN Pictures
1958 (7th)	Water Lily	Premiere Productions
1959 (8th)
1959 (8th)	Biyaya Ng Lupa	LVN Pictures
1959 (8th)	Cry Freedom	Banaue Pictures
1959 (8th)	Kamandag	Sampaguita Pictures
1959 (8th)	Kilabot Sa Makiling	Sampaguita Pictures
1959 (8th)	Ang Maton	Premiere Productions

=== 1960s ===
Year	Film	Film Studio
1960 (9th)
1960 (9th)	Huwag Mo Akong Limutin	Premiere Productions
1960 (9th)	Gumuhong Bantayog	Sampaguita Pictures
1960 (9th)	Kadenang Putik	People's Pictures
1960 (9th)	Krus na Daan	Master Productions
1960 (9th)	Kung Ako'y Mahal Mo	LVN Pictures
1961 (10th)
1961 (10th)	Noli Me Tángere	Arriva Pictures and Bayanihan Productions
1961 (10th)	Alaala Kita	People's Pictures
1961 (10th)	Mga Yapak Na Walang Bakas	Premiere Productions, Inc. and Cirio H. Santiago Film Organization
1961 (10th)	The Moises Padilla Story	MML Productions and Newsreel Philippines
1961 (10th)	Nag-uumpugang Bato	Larry Santiago Productions
1962 (11th)
1962 (11th)	El Filibusterismo	Arriva Pictures and Bayanihan Productions
1962 (11th)	Ako Ang Katarungan	Premiere Productions
1962 (11th)	Albano Brothers	FPJ Productions, Inc. and Tagalog Ilang-Ilang Productions
1962 (11th)	Kapag Buhay Ang Inutang	People's Pictures
1962 (11th)	Ligaw Na Daigdig	Tamaraw Productions
1962 (11th)	Madugong Paghihiganti	MML Productions
1962 (11th)	Markang Rehas	Tagalog Ilang-Ilang Productions, Inc.
1962 (11th)	Oy... Akin Yata 'Yan	Dalisay Pictures, Inc.
1962 (11th)	Pitong Makasalanan	Tagalog Ilang-Ilang Productions, Inc.
1962 (11th)	Walang Pagkalupig	Jazmin Tagalog Pictures
1963 (12th)
1963 (12th)	Sigaw Ng Digmaan	FPJ Productions, Inc.
1963 (12th)	Angustia	Panlilio Films
1963 (12th)	Dapit-Hapon: Oras Ng Pagtutuus	Bernard Bonnin Productions
1963 (12th)	Ito Ang Maynila	FPJ Productions, Inc and Tagalog Ilang-Ilang Productions
1963 (12th)	The Arsenio Lacson Story	Cinemasters
1963 (12th)	Naku... Yabang!!!	Dalisay Pictures, Inc.
1963 (12th)	Sa Atin Ang Daigdig	Filipinas Productions
1963 (12th)	Sapagkat Kami'y Tao Lamang	Hollywood Far-East Productions
1963 (12th)	Zigzag	Medallion Pictures
1964 (13th)
1964 (13th)	Geron Busabos: Ang Batang Quiapo	Emar Pictures
1964 (13th)	Kulay Dugo Ang Gabi	People's Pictures
1964 (13th)	Sa Bawat Pintig Ng puso	Larry Santiago Productions, Inc.
1964 (13th)	Salambao	Zultana International
1964 (13th)	Scout Ranger	Zultana International
1965 (14th)
1965 (14th)	Ang Daigdig Ng Mga Api	Cinemasters Inc.
1965 (14th)	Ana Roberta	Ambassador Productions
1965 (14th)	Dugo sa Pantalan	Filmaker's Productions
1965 (14th)	Iginuhit Ng Tadhana: The Ferdinand E. Marcos Story	777 Films and Sampaguita Pictures
1965 (14th)	Iginuhit Sa Buhangin	Hollywood Far-East Productions
1965 (14th)	Pilipinas Kong Mahal	FPJ Productions, Inc.
1965 (14th)	A Portrait of the Artist as Filipino	Diadem Pictures and Cinema Artists
1965 (14th)	Sa Kamay Ng Mga Kilabot	Emar Pictures and Tagalog Ilang-Ilang Productions
1965 (14th)	Sa Oras Ng Kadiliman	Hollywood Far-East Productions
1965 (14th)	Sapang Palay	Emar Pictures
1966 (15th)
1966 (15th)	Ito Ang Pilipino	Emar Pictures
1966 (15th)	Dugo Ang Kulay Ng Pag-ibig	Dramatics Unlimited
1966 (15th)	Ibulong Mo Sa Hangin	AM Productions, Hemisphere Entertainment, and Sceptre
1966 (15th)	The Passionate Strangers	(Michael J. Parsons) MJP Productions
1966 (15th)	Sabotage	Tagalog Ilang-Ilang Productions
1967 (16th)
1967 (16th)	Kapag Puso'y Sinugatan	Virgo Film Productions
1967 (16th)	Dahil Sa Isang Bulaklak	Nepomuceno Productions
1967 (16th)	Ang Langit Ay Para Sa Lahat	Lopez Movie Enterprises/Lopez-Lewis Productions
1967 (16th)	O! Pagsintang Labis	Virgo Film Productions
1967 (16th)	Valiente Brothers	Emar Pictures
1968 (17th)
1968 (17th)	Igorota	Luis Nepomuceno Production
1968 (17th)	Artista Ang Aking Asawa	Lea Productions
1968 (17th)	Barbaro Cristobal	FPJ Productions, Inc.
1968 (17th)	De Colores	Arco Iris Motion Pictures
1968 (17th)	Kasalanan Kaya?	Virgo Film Productions
1968 (17th)	Oh, My Papa!	Lea Productions
1968 (17th)	Psycho Maniac	Queen Vee Pictures and Regina Productions
1968 (17th)	Salamisim	Lea Productions
1968 (17th)	Siete Dolores	Virgo Film Productions
1969 (18th)
1969 (18th)	Pinagbuklod Ng Langit	United Brothers Productions
1969 (18th)	Adriana	Lea Productions
1969 (18th)	Badlis Sa Kinabuhi	MG Productions
1969 (18th)	Ikaw	Virgo Film Productions
1969 (18th)	Patria Adorada	Emar Pictures

=== 1970s ===
Year	Film	Film Studio
1970 (19th)
1970 (19th)	Mga Anghel na Walang Langit	FPJ Productions
1970 (19th)	Psycho Sex Killer	Emar Pictures
1970 (19th)	Santiago!	Lea Productions
1970 (19th)	Tubog sa Ginto	Lea Productions
1970 (19th)	Wanted: Perfect Mother	Lea Productions
1971 (20th)
1971 (20th)	Lilet	Velarde and Associates
1971 (20th)	Asedillo	FPJ Productions
1971 (20th)	Hukom Bitay	Trans Asia Pictures
1971 (20th)	Lumuha Pati Mga Anghel	Lea Productions
1971 (20th)	Nympha	Joy Productions
1971 (20th)	Pagdating Sa Dulo	Frankesa Films and Mever Films
1971 (20th)	Ang Uliran (Imelda)	Premiere Productions, Inc.
1972 (21st)
1972 (21st)	Kill The Pushers	JE Productions
1972 (21st)	The Legend	Fernando Poe Jr. Pictures
1972 (21st)	Babae, Ikaw Ang Dahilan	Virgo Films
1972 (21st)	Mahalin Mo Sana Ako	Virgo Films
1972 (21st)	Tatay Na Si Erap!	JE Films
1972 (21st)	Villa Miranda	Lea Productions
1973 (22nd)
1973 (22nd)	Nueva Vizcaya	Roda Films and Rosal Films
1973 (22nd)	Erap Is My Guy	JE Productions
1973 (22nd)	Esteban	Fernando Poe Jr. Pictures
1973 (22nd)	Lalaki, Kasalanan Mo	Virgo Films
1973 (22nd)	Ang Mahiwagang Daigdig Ni Pedro Penduko	Topaz Films
1973 (22nd)	Paru-Parong Itim	NV Productions
1973 (22nd)	Tanikalang Dugo	Lea Productions
1974 (23rd)
1974 (23rd)	Tinimbang Ka Ngunit Kulang	CineManila Corp.
1974 (23rd)	Alaala Mo... Daigdig Ko!	Virgo Films
1974 (23rd)	Batingaw	Virgo Films
1974 (23rd)	Isang Gabi, Tatlong Babae	Juan de la Cruz Prod
1974 (23rd)	Kapitan Eddie Set: Mad Killer of Cavite	Imus Prod
1974 (23rd)	Manila Connection	JE Productions
1974 (23rd)	Pacific Connection	Luis Nepomuceno Productions
1974 (23rd)	Patayin Mo Sa Sindak Si Barbara	Rosas Productions
1974 (23rd)	Ang Pinakamagandang Hayop sa Balat ng Lupa	Gemini Films International
1975 (24th)
1975 (24th)	MAYNILA Sa Mga Kuko Ng Liwanag	Cinema Artists
1975 (24th)	Banaue: Stairway To The Sky	NV Productions
1975 (24th)	Hatulan Kung Kasalanan	Emperor Films
1975 (24th)	Lumapit, Lumayo Ang Umaga	Lea Productions
1975 (24th)	Saan Ka Pupunta, Miss Lutgarda Nicolas?	Silver Films
1976 (25th)
1976 (25th)	Minsa'y Isang Gamu-gamo	Premiere Productions
1976 (25th)	Ganito Kami Noon... Paano Kayo Ngayon?	Hemisphere Pictures (Phils.), Inc.
1976 (25th)	Insiang	CineManila Corp.
1976 (25th)	Itim	Cinema Artists
1976 (25th)	Tatlong Taong Walang Diyos	NV Productions
1977 (26th)
1977 (26th)	Bakya Mo Neneng	JE Productions
1977 (26th)	Maligno	Rosas Productions
1978 (27th)
1978 (27th)	Pagputi Ng Uwak... Pag-itim Ng Tagak	VS Films Corporation, Inc.
1978 (27th)	Atsay	Ian Film Productions
1978 (27th)	Gumising Ka... Maruja	Fernando Poe Jr. Pictures
1978 (27th)	Isang Gabi Sa Iyo, Isang Gabi Sa Akin	AA Productions
1978 (27th)	Rubia Servios	Sampaguita Pictures
1979 (28th)
1979 (28th)	Jaguar	Bancom Audiovision Productions
1979 (28th)	Durugin Si Totoy Bato	Fernando Poe Jr. Pictures
1979 (28th)	Huwag!	Seven Star Productions
1979 (28th)	Ina Ka ng Anak Mo	PPT Productions
1979 (28th)	Ang Lihim Ng Guadalupe	Fernando Poe Jr. Pictures

=== 1980s ===
Year	Film	Film Studio
1980 (29th)
1980 (29th)	Aguila	Bancom Audiovision Corporation
1980 (29th)	Brutal	Bancom Audiovision Corporation
1980 (29th)	Kakabakaba Ka Ba?	LVN Pictures
1980 (29th)	Langis at Tubig	Sining Silangan Productions
1980 (29th)	Pag-ibig Na Walang Dangal	Bancom Audiovision Corporation
1980 (29th)	Taga Sa Panahon	Premiere Productions
1981 (30th)
1981 (30th)	Kumander Alibasbas	JE Productions
1981 (30th)	Bakit Bughaw ang Langit?	Four Seasons Films International
1981 (30th)	Pakawalan Mo Ako	MVP Pictures
1981 (30th)	Salome	Bancom Audiovision Corporation
1982 (31st)
1982 (31st)	Cain at Abel	Cine Suerte, Inc.
1982 (31st)	Gaano Kadalas Ang Minsan?	Viva Films
1982 (31st)	Himala	Experimental Cinema of the Philippines
1982 (31st)	Ang Panday: Ikatlong Yugto	Fernando Poe Jr. Pictures
1982 (31st)	Sinasamba Kita	Viva Films
1983 (32nd)
1983 (32nd)	Of the Flesh	Cine Suerte, Inc.
1983 (32nd)	Broken Marriage	Regal Films
1983 (32nd)	Nagalit ang Buwan sa Haba ng Gabi	Essex Films
1983 (32nd)	Paano Ba ang Mangarap?	Viva Films
1983 (32nd)	Pieta	Amazaldy Film Production
1983 (32nd)	Saan Darating ang Umaga?	Viva Films
1983 (32nd)	Umpisahan Mo... Tatapusin Ko!	Fernando Poe Jr. Pictures
1984 (33rd)
1984 (33rd)	Ang Padrino	Fernando Poe Jr. Pictures
1984 (33rd)	Bulaklak sa City Jail	Cherubim Films
1984 (33rd)	Misteryo sa Tuwa	Experimental Cinema of the Philippines
1984 (33rd)	Nang Masugatan ang Gabi	HPS Productions
1984 (33rd)	Pasukuin Si Waway	Vanguard Films, Inc.
1984 (33rd)	Pieta: Ikalawang Aklat	Amazaldy Film Production
1984 (33rd)	Sister Stella L.	Regal Films
1984 (33rd)	Working Girls	Viva Films
1985 (34th)
1985 (34th)	Paradise Inn	Amazaldy Film Production
1985 (34th)	Bakit Manipis ang Ulap?	Essex Films
1985 (34th)	This Is My Country	Malaya Films and Stephan Films
1985 (34th)	Miguelito: Batang Rebelde	D'Wonder Films
1985 (34th)	Partida	Cine Suerte, Inc.
1986 (35th)
1986 (35th)	Gabi Na, Kumander	Viva Films
1986 (35th)	Lumuhod Ka Sa Lupa!	Seiko Films
1986 (35th)	Magdusa Ka!	Viva Films
1986 (35th)	Muslim .357	EDL Productions
1986 (35th)	Nasaan Ka Nang Kailangan Kita	Regal Films
1986 (35th)	Unfaithful Wife	Regal Films
1987 (36th)
1987 (36th)	Saan Nagtatago ang Pag-ibig?	Viva Films
1987 (36th)	Balweg	Viva Films
1987 (36th)	Paano Kung Wala Ka Na?	Regal Films
1987 (36th)	Pinulot Ka Lang sa Lupa	Regal Films
1987 (36th)	Tagos ng Dugo	V.H. Films
1988 (37th)
1988 (37th)	Ibulong Mo sa Diyos	Regal Films
1988 (37th)	Celestina Sanchez, Alyas Bubbles – Enforcer: Ativan Gang	Golden Lions Films International
1988 (37th)	Huwag Mong Itanong Kung Bakit	Viva Films
1988 (37th)	Lorenzo Ruiz: The Saint... A Filipino	R.J.U. Films International
1988 (37th)	Magkano ang Iyong Dangal?	Seiko Films
1988 (37th)	Nagbabagang Luha	Regal Films
1988 (37th)	Paano Tatakasan ang Bukas?	Viva Films
1989 (38th)
1989 (38th)	Bilangin ang Bituin sa Langit	Regal Films
1989 (38th)	Ako ang Huhusga	Bonanza Films
1989 (38th)	Imortal	Viva Films
1989 (38th)	Ipaglalaban Ko	Seiko Films
1989 (38th)	Macho Dancer	Award Films, Special People Productions and Viva Films
1989 (38th)	Pahiram ng Isang Umaga	Regal Films

=== 1990s ===
Year	Film	Film Studio
1990 (39th)
1990 (39th)	Andrea, Paano Ba ang Maging Isang Ina?	MRN Films
1990 (39th)	Bala At Rosaryo	Vision Films
1990 (39th)	Gumapang Ka sa Lusak	Viva Films
1990 (39th)	Kaaway ng Batas	Reflection Films
1990 (39th)	My Other Woman	Regal Films
1991 (40th)
1991 (40th)	Ang Totoong Buhay ni Pacita M.	MRN Films
1991 (40th)	Hihintayin Kita sa Langit	Reyna Films
1991 (40th)	Ipagpatawad Mo	Viva Films
1991 (40th)	Kislap sa Dilim	Bonanza Films and Reflection Films
1991 (40th)	Una Kang Naging Akin	Viva Films
1992 (41st)
1992 (41st)	Ikaw Pa Lang ang Minahal	Reyna Films
1992 (41st)	Iisa Pa Lamang	Regal Films
1992 (41st)	Lumayo Ka Man Sa Akin	Seiko Films
1992 (41st)	Narito ang Puso Ko	Viva Films
1992 (41st)	Sinungaling Mong Puso	Regal Films
1993 (42nd)
1993 (42nd)	Masahol Pa sa Hayop	Four N Films
1993 (42nd)	Dahil Mahal Kita: The Dolzura Cortez Story	OctoArts Films
1993 (42nd)	Kung Mawawala Ka Pa	Reyna Films
1993 (42nd)	May Minamahal	Star Cinema
1993 (42nd)	Sakay	Alpha Omega Productions, Zeta Enterprises
1994 (43rd)
1994 (43rd)	Lipa "Arandia" Massacre: Lord, Deliver Us from Evil	Viva Films, Golden Lions Films
1994 (43rd)	Maalaala Mo Kaya?: The Movie	Star Cinema
1994 (43rd)	Nag-iisang Bituin	Regal Films
1994 (43rd)	Pangako ng Kahapon	Viva Films
1994 (43rd)	Separada	Star Cinema
1995 (44th)
1995 (44th)	Inagaw Mo ang Lahat sa Akin	Reyna Films
1995 (44th)	Dahas	MAQ Productions, Inc.
1995 (44th)	Kahit Butas ng Karayom... Papasukin Ko	Libran Films, Inc.
1995 (44th)	Sana Maulit Muli	Star Cinema
1995 (44th)	The Flor Contemplacion Story	Viva Films
1996 (45th)
1996 (45th)	Mumbaki	Neo Films
1996 (45th)	Madrasta	Star Cinema
1996 (45th)	May Nagmamahal Sa'yo	Star Cinema
1996 (45th)	Mulanay: Sa Pusod ng Paraiso	Teamwork Productions
1996 (45th)	Segurista	Neo Films
1997 (46th)
1997 (46th)	Rizal sa Dapitan	Independent Cinema Association of the Philippines, Movpix International, PLDT
1997 (46th)	Damong Ligaw	Premiere Productions
1997 (46th)	Hanggang Kailan Kita Mamahalin?	Star Cinema
1997 (46th)	Nasaan Ang Puso	MAQ Productions, Inc.
1997 (46th)	The Sarah Balabagan Story	Viva Films
1998 (47th)
1998 (47th)	José Rizal	GMA Films
1998 (47th)	Ama Namin	Premiere Productions, Inc.
1998 (47th)	Sa Pusod ng Dagat	GMA Films
1998 (47th)	Bata, Bata... Pa'no Ka Ginawa?	Star Cinema
1998 (47th)	Sambahin ang Ngalan Mo	MAQ Productions, Inc.
1999 (48th)
1999 (48th)	Muro-Ami	GMA Films
1999 (48th)	Higit Pa sa Buhay Ko	MAQ Productions, Inc.
1999 (48th)	Sidhi	Crown Seven Ventures
1999 (48th)	Soltera	Star Cinema
1999 (48th)	Saranggola	GMA Films

=== 2000s ===
Year	Film	Film Studio
2000 (49th)
2000 (49th)	Tanging Yaman	Star Cinema
2000 (49th)	Anak	Star Cinema
2000 (49th)	Azucena	Reyna Films
2000 (49th)	Deathrow	GMA Films
2000 (49th)	Tunay Na Mahal	Regal Films
2001 (50th)
2001 (50th)	Bagong Buwan	Bahaghari Productions, Star Cinema
2001 (50th)	Abakada... Ina	Viva Films
2001 (50th)	In the Bosom of the Enemy	Crown Seven Ventures
2001 (50th)	Tatarin	Viva Films
2001 (50th)	Yamashita: The Tiger's Treasure	MAQ Productions, Inc.
2002 (51st)
2002 (51st)	Small Voices	College Assurance Plan (CAP) Philippines, Teamwork Productions
2002 (51st)	Batas ng Lansangan	Maverick Films
2002 (51st)	Kailangan Kita	Star Cinema
2003 (52nd)
2003 (52nd)	Magnifico	Violett Films Production
2003 (52nd)	Ang Tanging Ina	Star Cinema
2003 (52nd)	Chavit	Golden Lions Films, Starmax International, Velcor Films
2003 (52nd)	Filipinas	Viva Films
2003 (52nd)	Homecoming	Cinema Partners, Frontera Media Productions, Kidlat Entertainment, Teamwork Productions
2004 (53rd)
2004 (53rd)	Naglalayag	Angora Films
2004 (53rd)	Aishite Imasu 1941: Mahal Kita	BAS Film Productions Inc.
2004 (53rd)	Feng Shui	Star Cinema
2004 (53rd)	Milan	Star Cinema
2004 (53rd)	Panaghoy sa Suba	CM Films
2005 (54th)
2005 (54th)	Nasaan Ka Man	Star Cinema
2005 (54th)	Mano Po 4: Ako Legal Wife	Regal Films
2005 (54th)	Dubai	Star Cinema
2005 (54th)	Kutob	Canary Films
2005 (54th)	Mga Pusang Gala	Erasto Productions and MLR Films Inc.
2006 (55th)
2006 (55th)	Kasal, Kasali, Kasalo	Star Cinema
2006 (55th)	Inang Yaya	Unitel Pictures
2006 (55th)	Summer Heat	Centerstage Productions and G-Entertainment
2006 (55th)	Kubrador	MLR Films Inc.
2006 (55th)	Umaaraw, Umuulan	Heaven's Best Productions
2007 (56th)
2007 (56th)	Katas Ng Saudi	Maverick Films
2007 (56th)	A Love Story	Star Cinema
2007 (56th)	Ataul: For Rent	Artiste Entertainment Works International
2007 (56th)	Confessional	Oddfield Productions, Cinema One Originals and Creative Programs
2007 (56th)	Paano Kita Iibigin	Star Cinema and Viva Films
2008 (57th)
2008 (57th)	Baler	BIDA Productions, Inc. and Viva Films
2008 (57th)	Ay Ayeng	Aloha Pearl Films and Film Artist
2008 (57th)	Caregiver	Star Cinema
2008 (57th)	Magkaibigan	Maverick Films
2008 (57th)	Ploning	Panoramanila Pictures
2008 (57th)	When Love Begins...	Star Cinema and Viva Films
2009 (58th)
2009 (58th)	Dukot	ATD Entertainment
2009 (58th)	Ang Panday	GMA Films and Imus Productions
2009 (58th)	I Love You, Goodbye	Star Cinema
2009 (58th)	In My Life	Star Cinema
2009 (58th)	Mano Po 6: A Mother's Love	Regal Films
2009 (58th)	Sagrada Familia	Legalas Entertainment Productions
2009 (58th)	You Changed My Life	Star Cinema and Viva Films

=== 2010s ===
Year	Film	Film Studio
2010 (59th)
2010 (59th)	Ang Tanging Ina Mo (Last na 'To!)	Star Cinema
2010 (59th)	Dalaw	Star Cinema, Cinemedia and MJM Productions
2010 (59th)	Miss You like Crazy	Star Cinema
2010 (59th)	Rosario	Cinemabuhay International, Studio 5
2010 (59th)	Sa'yo Lamang	Star Cinema
2010 (59th)	Sigwa	Beginnings at Twenty Plus, Cinemalaya Foundation, Star Express, Sine Totoo
2011 (60th)
2011 (60th)	Manila Kingpin: The Asiong Salonga Story	Viva Films, Scenema Concept International and CMB
2011 (60th)	A Mother's Story	The Filipino Channel
2011 (60th)	Ang Panday 2	GMA Films and Imus Productions
2011 (60th)	In the Name of Love	Star Cinema
2011 (60th)	Segunda Mano	Star Cinema, Agosto Dos Pictures and MJM Productions
2011 (60th)	The Road	GMA Films
2012 (61st)
2012 (61st)	El Presidente	Viva Films, Scenema Concept International and CMB
2012 (61st)	A Secret Affair	Viva Films
2012 (61st)	Migrante	XITI Productions
2012 (61st)	One More Try	Star Cinema
2012 (61st)	The Mistress	Star Cinema
2013 (62nd)
2013 (62nd)	On The Job	Star Cinema and Reality Entertainment
2013 (62nd)	10,000 Hours	N2 Pictures and Philippine Film Studios
2013 (62nd)	Boy Golden: Shoot To Kill	Scenema Concept International
2013 (62nd)	Burgos	Heaven's Best Entertainment
2013 (62nd)	Four Sisters And A Wedding	Star Cinema
2013 (62nd)	Lauriana	BG Pictures International, Inc. and Film Development Council of the Philippines
2013 (62nd)	Pagpag: Siyam na Buhay	Regal Entertainment and Star Cinema
2013 (62nd)	Ekstra	Cinemalaya Foundation and Quantum Films
2014 (63rd)
2014 (63rd)	Bonifacio: Ang Unang Pangulo	Philippians Productions, Inc., Buchi Boy Pictures and Tuko Film Productions, Inc.
2014 (63rd)	Asintado	Ignacio Films
2014 (63rd)	Feng Shui 2	Star Cinema and K Productions
2014 (63rd)	Hustisya	Likhang Silangan Entertainment
2014 (63rd)	Kamkam	Heaven's Best Entertainment
2014 (63rd)	Magkakabaung	ATD Entertainment Productions
2014 (63rd)	Muslim Magnum .357: To Serve and Protect	Scenema Concept International
2014 (63rd)	She's Dating the Gangster	Star Cinema
2014 (63rd)	Starting Over Again	Star Cinema
2014 (63rd)	The Trial	Star Cinema
2015 (64th)
2015 (64th)	Felix Manalo	Viva Films
2015 (64th)	A Second Chance	Star Cinema
2015 (64th)	Angela Markado	Oro de Siete Films, Viva Films
2015 (64th)	Ari: My Life with a King	Holy Angel University Center for Kapampangan Studies
2015 (64th)	Crazy Beautiful You	Star Cinema
2015 (64th)	Para sa Hopeless Romantic	Star Cinema, Viva Films
2015 (64th)	Silong	Black Maria Pictures, SQ Film Laboratories
2015 (64th)	The Love Affair	Star Cinema
2015 (64th)	Tragic Theater	Viva Films
2015 (64th)	You're My Boss	Star Cinema
2016 (65th)
2016 (65th)	Barcelona: A Love Untold	Star Cinema
2016 (65th)	Everything About Her	Star Cinema
2016 (65th)	Kusina	Cinemalaya Foundation, Cinematografica Films
2016 (65th)	The Unmarried Wife	Star Cinema
2016 (65th)	Ringgo: The Dog Shooter	
2017 (66th)
2017 (66th)	Balangiga: Howling Wilderness	QCinema
2017 (66th)	Ang Larawan	Culturtain Musicat Productions
2017 (66th)	Birdshot	PelikulaRED
2017 (66th)	Love You to the Stars and Back	ABS-CBN Film Productions, Inc.
2017 (66th)	Nervous Translation	Los Otros Films, Creative Programs
2017 (66th)	Paki	Cinema One Originals
2017 (66th)	Respeto	Cinemalaya Foundation
2017 (66th)	The Chanters	QCinema
2017 (66th)	Tu Pug Imatuy (The Right To Kill)	Red Motion Media and Solar Pictures
2017 (66th)	Yield	
2018 (67th)
2018 (67th)	Gusto Kita With All My Hypothalamus	The IdeaFirst Company
2018 (67th)	A Short History Of A Few Bad Things	Cinema One Originals and Deligero & Co.
2018 (67th)	Ang Dalawang Mrs. Reyes	ABS-CBN Film Productions, Inc.
2018 (67th)	Ang Panahon Ng Halimaw	Epic Media
2018 (67th)	Dog Days	QCinema
2018 (67th)	Goyo: Ang Batang Heneral	Artikulo Uno Productions and TBA Studios
2018 (67th)	Kung Paano Siya Nawala	Arkeo Films, Buchi Boy Films, TBA Studios and Tuko Films Productions
2018 (67th)	Never Not Love You	Viva Films
2018 (67th)	Never Tear Us Apart	ABS-CBN Film Productions, Inc.
2018 (67th)	Oda Sa Wala	Black Sheep Productions, and Epic Media
2019 (68th)
2019 (68th)	Aswang	Cinematografica, Les Productions de l'Oeil Sauvage, Razor Film Produktion GmbH, Stray Dog Productions
2019 (68th)	Babae at Baril	Cignal Entertainment, Epic Media, Quezon City Film Development Commission
2019 (68th)	Cleaners	Dambuhala Productions
2019 (68th)	John Denver Trending	Quantum Films
2019 (68th)	Kalel, 15	The IdeaFirst Company, Octobertrain Films, Cignal Entertainment
2019 (68th)	Verdict	Bord Cadre Films, Centerstage Productions, Films Boutique and Playtime

=== 2020s ===
Year	Film	Film Studio	Ref.
2020 (69th)	Magikland	Brightlight Productions, Gallaga-Reyes Films	
2020 (69th)	Block Z	Star Cinema, PelikulaRed	
2020 (69th)	Fan Girl	Globe Studios, Black Sheep Productions, Crossword Productions	
2020 (69th)	Four Sisters Before The Wedding	ABS-CBN Film Productions, Republic Biscuits, Star Cinema	
2020 (69th)	Hayop Ka!	Rocketsheep Studio, Spring Films	
2020 (69th)	He Who Is Without Sin	Sinag Maynila, Solar Pictures	
2020 (69th)	Isa Pang Bahaghari	Heaven's Best Entertainment	
2020 (69th)	Latay	BG Productions International, Center Stage Productions, Sinag Maynila	
2020 (69th)	Memories Of Forgetting	Hey Pogi, 2076Kolektib	
2020 (69th)	On Vodka, Beers, and Regrets	Viva Films	
2020 (69th)	Tagpuan	Alternative Vision Cinema	
2020 (69th)	Untrue	Viva Films, The IdeaFirst Company	
2020 (69th)	Watch List	BRON Studios, Reality Entertainment, State of Awe	
2021 (70th)	Katips	Philstagers Films	
2021 (70th)	A Hard Day	Viva Films	
2021 (70th)	Arisaka	Ten17P	
2021 (70th)	Big Night	Cignal Entertainment, Octoberbrain Films, and Quantum Films	
2021 (70th)	Kun Maupay Man It Panahon	Globe Studios, Black Sheep Productions, and Dreamscape Entertainment	
2022 (71st)	Family Matters	Philstagers Cinesko Productions, Top Story	
2022 (71st)	Blue Room	Cinemalaya Foundation, CreatePH Films, and Eyepoppers Multimedia Services	
2022 (71st)	Leonor Will Never Die	Arkeofilms, ANIMA	
2022 (71st)	La Traidora	AQ Prime	
2022 (71st)	Deleter	Pelikula Red, Top Story	
2023 (72nd)	Mallari	Mentorque Productions, Clever Minds Inc.	
2023 (72nd)	GomBurZa	Jessuit Communications, MQuest Ventures, CMB Film Services	
2023 (72nd)	The Missing	Project 8, GMA News and Public Affairs, Terminal Six Post	
2023 (72nd)	Rewind	ABS-CBN Film Productions, Inc., APT Entertainment, AgostoDos Pictures	
2023 (72nd)	A Very Good Girl	ABS-CBN Film Productions, Inc.	
2024 (73rd)	Alipato at Muog	Pulang Langgam Media Productions	
2024 (73rd)	And the Breadwinner Is...	ABS-CBN Studios, The IdeaFirst Company	
2024 (73rd)	Balota	GMA Pictures, GMA Entertainment Group, Film Development Council of the Philippines	
2024 (73rd)	Green Bones	GMA Pictures, GMA Public Affairs, Brightburn Entertainment	
2024 (73rd)	Mamay: A Journey to Greatness	Mamay Production	
2024 (73rd)	The Hearing	Center Stage Productions, Pelikulaw	
2024 (73rd)	Topakk	Nathan Studios, Strawdogs Studio Production, FUSEE, Theo & Atlas Productions	
2024 (73rd)	Under a Piaya Moon	Bakunawa Films, Green Pelican Studios, Jungle Room Creatives	
2024 (73rd)	Uninvited	Mentorque Productions, Project 8 Projects	
2024 (73rd)	When Magic Hurts	REMS Entertainment Production, IGMM Film Production, Axinite Digicinema Inc.	
