= When Magic Hurts =

2024 Philippine romance film

- Theatrical release poster
- Directed by: Gabby Ramos
- Written by: Jerome Baguio
- Story by: Angel Gwenavere
- Produced by: Angel Gwanavere
- Starring: Mutya Orquia; Beaver Magtalas; Maxine Trinidad; Claudine Barretto
- Cinematography: George Toralba
- Edited by: Martin Reyes
- Music by: Jason Bagasina
- Production companies: REMS Entertainment Production; IGMM Film Production; Axinite Digicinema Inc.
- Distributed by: REMS Entertainment Production
- Release date: May 22, 2024
- Running time: 119 minutes
- Country: Philippines
- Language: Filipino

When Magic Hurts is a 2024 Philippine romance film written by Jerome Baguio and directed by Gabby Ramos. It stars Mutya Orquia, Beaver Magtalas, Maxine Trinidad and Claudine Barretto. It is Orquia's film debut.

== Plot ==
Ernest (Beaver Magtalas) is a humble and obedient son, striving to meet his parents' expectations. A photography enthusiast, he finds inspiration in the famed flower farms of Benguet. His life takes a turn when he meets Olivia, a hardworking florist who has become disillusioned with love and magic due to past traumas. Ernest is also in a relationship with Trixie (Maxine Trinidad), the daughter of his father's business partner, adding complexity to his personal life.

Olivia (Mutya Orquia) is grappling with the loss of both her parents. Once a believer in magic, she now finds herself unable to trust in its power. Her encounter with Ernest rekindles a sense of hope and connection, challenging her to confront her past and open her heart once more.

As Ernest and Olivia spend time together amidst the scenic landscapes of Atok, their bond deepens. They find solace in each other's company, navigating the complexities of love, family expectations, and personal growth. Their relationship faces challenges, including Ernest's existing commitment to Trixie and the societal pressures surrounding them.

== Cast ==
- Mutya Orquia as Grace “Olivia” Melchor
- Beaver Magtalas
- Maxine Trinidad
- Claudine Barretto
- Aryanna Barretto
- Dennis Padilla
- Soliman Cruz
- Angelica Jones
- Archi Adamos
- Aileen Papin
- Dennah Bautista

== Production ==
On July 22, 2023, director Gabby Ramos said in the conference that the film is inspired on Claudine Barretto and Rico Yan's film Got 2 Believe.

The film got the license to use the song Got to Believe in Magic by David Pomeranz and Cedric Escobar have the chance to sung it for the official soundtrack of the film.

=== Filming ===
On July 26, 2023, the cast and crew are started to shoot the film in Baguio but they postponed it due to Typhoon Egay. They also shoot the film in Atok, Benguet.

== Release ==
The film had its red carpet premier in Cabanatuan on May 12, 2024. It is scheduled to release nationwide on May 22, 2024.

== Accolades ==
Accolades received by When Magic Hurts
Award	Date of ceremony	Category	Recipient(s)	Result	Ref.
73rd FAMAS Awards	August 22, 2025	Best Supporting Actress	Claudine Barretto	Nominated	
73rd FAMAS Awards	August 22, 2025	Best Director	Gabby Ramos	Nominated	
73rd FAMAS Awards	August 22, 2025	Best Picture	When Magic Hurts	Nominated	
73rd FAMAS Awards	August 22, 2025	Best Musical Score	Jason Bagasina	Nominated	
73rd FAMAS Awards	August 22, 2025	Best Song	"Paruparo" – When Magic Hurts	Nominated	
73rd FAMAS Awards	August 22, 2025	Best Cinematography	George Toralba	Nominated	
73rd FAMAS Awards	August 22, 2025	Best Production Design	When Magic Hurts	Nominated	
41st Star Awards for Movies	November 30, 2025	New Movie Actor of the Year	Beaver Magtalas	Nominated	
41st Star Awards for Movies	November 30, 2025	New Movie Actress of the Year	Mutya Orquia	Nominated	
41st Star Awards for Movies	November 30, 2025	New Movie Actress of the Year	Maxine Trinidad	Nominated	
41st Star Awards for Movies	November 30, 2025	Indie Movie Theme Song of the Year	“Paruparo” – Kate Irish	Nominated	
41st Star Awards for Movies	November 30, 2025	Movie Loveteam of the Year	Beaver Magtalas & Mutya Orquia	Nominated	
