= Marlene Daudén =

Filipina actress

- Born: Margarita Llorente Dauden; November 9, 1937 (age 88)
- Occupation: Actress
- Years active: 1957–1972, 1975, 1978
- Spouse: Ernesto Hernaez
- Children: 3

Margarita Llorente Daudén (born November 9, 1937) known professionally as Marlene Daudén, is a Filipino actress. Known for her performances in drama, particularly with themes of infidelity triangle, she was one of the top box-office draws of the 1960s and one of the leading dramatic actresses of the period. She has appeared in 75 motion pictures throughout her career spanning nearly two decades. Her accolades include five FAMAS Awards and a Manila Film Festival Award.

== Life and career ==
=== Early life and background ===
Born to a Spanish-Irish father and a Spanish-Filipino mother, Dauden grew up in a Spanish-speaking household. In 1956, she finished as a finalist in the competition Goldwin Girl of the Philippines.

=== 1957-1971: Breakthrough and stardom ===
In 1957, Dauden, who just graduated from high school at St. Scholastica's College, was discovered by film producer Jose Roxas Perez and was then launched in the romantic drama Mga Ligaw na Bulaklak. A stranger to the Filipino language, Dauden had to learn how to speak the language and ask assistance from her co-stars early in her career as she only spoke English at school and Spanish at home. Later that year, she was cast in a secondary role in Gabi at Araw. The following year, Dauden appeared in ten film productions. Among them, she received two nominations for the FAMAS Award for Best Supporting Actress for her roles in Talipandas and Anino ng Bathala, winning one for the latter. In 1959, she appeared in five productions under Sampaguita Pictures. Dauden starred as the titular role in the live adaptation of Mars Ravelo's Rosa Rossini. She received her second FAMAS Award for Best Supporting Actress for her performance in the action drama Kamandag.

In 1967, Dauden was named Miss Philippine Movies.

=== 1972-1978: Final projects and retirement ===
In 1972, Dauden starred in the romantic drama Babae... Ikaw ang Dahilan! with Amalia Fuentes and Eddie Rodriguez. The film was an official entry to the 7th Manila Film Festival, where she was named Best Actress. Later that year, Dauden and her family decided to permanently migrate to San Francisco, California, which was also the time when then President Ferdinand Marcos placed the Philippines under martial law. Her next film role was in the drama Siya’y Umalis, Siya’y Dumating, which was an official entry to the first ever Metro Manila Film Festival in 1975. After years of absence, she appeared in her final film project Kung Kaya Mo Kaya Ko Rin in 1978, where she starred with Christopher de Leon and Eddie Garcia.

== Public image and reception ==
Nestor Torre of Entertainment Inquirer described Dauden as an "orchidaceous beauty... reminiscent of Sophia Loren and other Italian screen beauties". On a research conducted by SunStar writer Mila Espina, she named her one of the most beautiful faces in the Philippines, based on survey results.

Dauden is often regarded by numerous critics as one of the greatest Filipino actresses in Philippine cinema. She was the first Filipino actress to achieve five competitive FAMAS Awards. John Ryann Gallego of the SunStar described her, including Carmen Rosales and Lolita Rodriguez, as a "natural and versatile" actress. Dauden, together with frequent collaborators Lolita Rodriguez and Eddie Rodriguez, are credited for popularizing the love triangle drama in Philippine cinema, following the reception of the romantic drama Sapagkat Kami'y Tao Lamang. Writing for Manila Bulletin, Jojo Panaligan described the trio as "the precursor of today’s infidelity triangles."

== Acting credits ==
=== Film ===
Marlene Dauden's film credits with year of release, film titles and roles
Year	Title	Role	Notes	Ref(s).
1957	Mga Ligaw na Bulaklak			
1957	Gabi at Araw			
1958	Kundiman ng Puso			
1958	Pulot Gata			
1958	Anino ni Bathala	Sylvia		
1958	Silveria: Ang Kabayong Daldalera	Loisa		
1958	Mapait na Lihim			
1958	Berdaderong Ginto			
1958	Alaalang Banal			
1958	Talipandas			
1958	Dewey Boulevard			
1958	Mga Kwento ni Lola Basyang	Prinsesa Lucinda	Segment: "Ang Mahiwagang Kuba"	
1959	Pitong Pagsisisi			
1959	Rosa Rossini	Rosa Rossini		
1959	Kamandag			
1959	Isinumpa			
1959	Ipinagbili Kami ng aming Tatay			
1960	Berdugo			
1960	Kuwintas ng Alaala			
1960	Pagpatak ng Ulan			
1960	Ipagdarasal Kita			
1960	Gumuhong Bantayog			
1960	Siete Amores		Segment: "Bicol Story"	
1961	Karugtong ng Kahapon			
1962	The Big Broadcast			
1962	Hiram na Kamay			
1962	Magbayad ang May Utang			
1963	Sa Puso ng Isang Ina			
1963	Sapagkat Kami'y Tao Lamang			
1963	Ang Senyorito at ang Atsay	Helen		
1964	The Reycard Duet Story			
1964	Tatlong Siga sa Maynila			
1964	Sa Bawat Pintig ng Puso			
1965	Iginuhit sa Buhangin			
1965	Milarosa	Milarosa		
1965	Sa Oras ng Kadiliman			
1965	Maria Cecilia	Maria Cecilia		
1965	Kay Tagal ng Umaga			
1965	Kung Wala na ang Pag-ibig			
1965	Silang Nabubuhay sa Daigdig			
1965	Mastermind			
1966	Hindi Nahahati ang Langit			
1966	Mistico Meets Mamaw			
1966	Gintong Bahaghari			
1966	Ako'y Magbabalik!			
1966	Bakit Pa Ako Isinilang?			
1966	Saan Ka Man Naroroon			
1966	Maghapong Walang Araw			
1966	Kill... Tony Falcon			
1966	Sa Bawat Lansangan			
1967	Modus Operandi			
1967	Kapag Puso'y Sinugatan			
1967	Masquerade	Veronica de Villa		
1967	Langit pa rin Kita	Silvana		
1967	At sa Ngalan ng Pag-ibig			
1967	Bukod Kang Pinagpala			
1968	Alipin ng Busabos	Melda		
1968	Dear Kuya Cesar			
1968	Elizabeth	Liza		
1968	Kasalanan Kaya?			
1968	Liko-likong Landas			
1968	Simula ng Walang Hanggan			
1968	Sino ang May Karapatan?			
1968	The Specialists			
1968	Triple	Socorro/ Maricha/ Dolora		
1969	Seven Deadly Roses			
1969	Gumuho Man ang Langit!			
1970	Combat Killers	Pelita Cruz		
1970	Pagkakamali Ba?			
1970	Bakit Ako Pa			
1971	Banal na Pag-ibig			
1971	Kapantay ay Langit			
1972	Babae... Ikaw ang Dahilan!			
1975	Siya'y Umalis, Siya'y Dumating			
1978	Kung Kaya Mo, Kaya Ko Rin			

=== Television ===
Marlene Dauden's television credits with year of release, title(s) and role
Year	Title	Role	Notes	Ref(s)
1968	Salamisim			
1972	Panagimpan			

== Accolades ==
Awards and nominations received by Marlene Dauden
Organizations	Year (Note: Indicates the year of ceremony. Each year is linked to the article about the awards held that year, wherever possible.)	Work	Category	Result	Ref(s)
FAMAS Awards	1959	Talipandas	Best Supporting Actress	Nominated	
FAMAS Awards	1959	Anino ni Bathala	Best Supporting Actress	Won	
FAMAS Awards	1960	Kamandag	Best Supporting Actress	Won	
FAMAS Awards	1961	Gumuhong Bantayog	Best Actress	Nominated	
FAMAS Awards	1964	Sapagkat Kami'y Tao Lamang	Best Supporting Actress	Won	
FAMAS Awards	1965	Sa Bawat Pintig ng Puso	Best Actress	Won	
FAMAS Awards	1966	Milarosa	Best Actress	Nominated	
FAMAS Awards	1968	Kapag Puso'y Sinugatan	Best Actress	Won	
FAMAS Awards	1969	Alipin ng Busabos	Best Actress	Nominated	
FAMAS Awards	1973	Babae... Ikaw ang Dahilan	Best Actress	Nominated	
Gawad Parangal sa mga Ginintuang Bituin ng Pelikulang Pilipino	2010	Marlene Dauden	Honoree	Won	
Manila Film Festival	1972	Babae... Ikaw ang Dahilan	Best Actress	Won	

== See also ==
- Cinema of the Philippines
- List of Filipino actresses
- Television in the Philippines
