= 1956 FAMAS Awards =

Award ceremony at Manilla Hotel

4th FAMAS Awards
- Date: March 17, 1956
- Site: Fiesta Pavilion, Manila Hotel

Highlights
- Best Picture: Higit Sa Lahat (LVN Pictures)
- Most awards: Higit Sa Lahat (LVN Pictures)

The 4th Filipino Academy of Movie Arts and Sciences Awards Night was held on MARCH 17, 1956 for the Outstanding Achievements in 1955 at Fiesta Pavilion in Manila Hotel.

Higit Sa Lahat, by (LVN Pictures) is the recipient of this edition's FAMAS Award for Best Picture.

== Awards ==
=== Major Awards ===
Winners are listed first and highlighted with boldface.

Best Picture	Best Director
**Higit sa Lahat — LVN Pictures**; Dakilang Hudas — Peoples Picture; Paltik — Premiere; Rossana — Sampaguita; Sonny Boy — LVN Pictures	**Gregorio Fernandez — Higit sa Lahat**; Teodorico C. Santos — Dakilang Hudas; Manuel Conde. — Ikaw Kasi; Teodorico C. Santos — Pandora; Armando Garces — Rossana; Natalio Bacalso — Salingsing sa Kasakit; Gerardo de Leon — Sanda Wong; Susana C. de Guzman — Sonny Boy
Best Actor	Best Actress
**Rogelio de la Rosa — Higit sa Lahat**; Eddie del Mar — Bandilang Pula; Jose Padilla Jr. — Dakilang Judas; Jose Padilla Jr. — Paltik; Danilo Montes — Sanda Wong	**Rosa Rosal — Sonny Boy**; Emma Alegre — Higit sa Lahat; Leila Morena — Pandora; Lolita Rodriguez — Rossana; Rosita Noble — Torpe
Best Supporting Actor	Best Supporting Actress
**Panchito — Lupang kayumanggi**; Ramon D'Salva — Adventures of DI-13; Oscar Keesee — Higit sa Lahat; Leroy Salvador — Pilipino kostum: no touch; Gil de Leon — Sanda Wong	**Celia Fuentes — Simaron**; Belen Velasco — Dakilang Hudas; Daisy Romualdez — Lupang Kayumanggi; Norma Vales — Lupang Kayumnggi; Carol Varga — Paltik; Rosa Mia — Rossana; Ligaya Lopez — Sanda Wong; Ludy Carmona — Talusing; Loida Morales — Talusing
Best in Screenplay	Best Cinematography (black and white)
**Susana C. de Guzman — Sonny Boy**; Gregorio Fernandez — Higit sa Lahat; Armando Garces Chito B. Tapawan — Lupang Kayumanggi; Armando Garces W. Ofrunda — Rossana; Tony Santos Ding Santos — Sanda Wong	**Tommy Marcelino — Paltik**
Best Sound	Best Musical Score
**July P. Hidalgo — Higit sa Lahat**	**Tony Maiquez — Pandora**
Best Story	Best Child Performer
**Mario Mijares Lopez — Higit sa Lahat**	Undo Juizan — Salingsing sa kasakit:
