= 1962 FAMAS Awards =

Annual Filipino film awards ceremony

10th FAMAS Awards
- Date: 1962
- Site: Philippines

Highlights
- Best Picture: Noli Me Tángere (Arriva-Bayanihan Productions)
- Most awards: Noli Me Tangere (5 wins)
- Most nominations: Noli Me Tangere (9 nominations)

The 10th Filipino Academy of Movie Arts and Sciences Awards Night was held in 1962 for the Outstanding Achievements for the year 1961.

Noli Me Tangere is a movie based on the book of the same title written by the Philippine National Hero Dr.Jose Rizal; won the most coveted award the FAMAS Award for Best Picture at the 10th FAMAS Awards.

== Awards ==
=== Major awards ===
Winners are listed first and highlighted with boldface.

Best Picture	Best Director
**Noli Me Tángere — Arriva-Bayanihan Productions**; Alaala Kita — Peoples Pictures; The Moises Padilla Story — MMl Productions; Naguumpugang Bato — Larry Santiago Productions; Mga Yapak Na Walang Bakas — Premiere Productions	**Gerardo de Leon — Noli Me Tángere**; Cesar Gallardo — Alala Kita; Gerardo de Leon — The Moises Padilla Story; Pablo Santiago — Nag-uumpugang Bato; Cirio H. Santiago — Mga Yapak Na Walang Bakas
Best Actor	Best Actress
**Leopoldo Salcedo — The Moises Padilla Story**; Efren Reyes — Alaala Kita; Eddie Del Mar — Noli Me Tángere; Ronald Remy — Pusong Bakal; Nestor De Villa — Mga Yapak Na Walang Bakas	**Tessie Quintana — Alaala Kita**; Anita Linda — Nag-uumpugang Bato; Edita Vital — Noli Me Tángere; Lilia Dizon — Pusong Bakal; Aura Aurea — Mga Yapak Na Walang Bakas
Best Supporting Actor	Best Supporting Actress
**Oscar Keesee — Noli Me Tángere**; Ruben Rustia — Alaala Kita; Max Alvarado — Nag-uumpugang Bato; Johnny Monteiro — Noli Me Tángere; Quiel Segovia— Mga Yapak Na Walang Bakas	**Lina Cariño — Noli Me Tángere**; Rosa Aguirre — The Moises Padilla Story; Vilma Valera — Naguumpugang Bato; Lilian Leonardo — Pusong Bakal; Elvira Reyes — Mga Yapak Na Walang Bakas
Best in Screenplay	Best Story
**Felipe Sacdalan — Mga Yapak Na Walang Bakas**	**Jose Rizal — Noli Me Tángere**
Best Musical Score	Best Editing
**Tito Arevalo — Noli Me Tángere**	**Teofilo de Leon — The Moises Padilla Story**
Best Cinematography	
**Felipe Sacdalan — Mga Yapak Na Walang Bakas**	

=== Special Awardee ===
- **International Prestige Award of Merit**
  - **La Campana de Baler**
- **Dr. Ciriaco Santiago Memorial Award**
  - **Lamberto V. Avellana**
