= 1954 FAMAS Awards =

Annual Filipino awards for achievements in film

2nd FAMAS Awards
- Date: 1954
- Site: Life Theater, Quezon Boulevard, Quiapo, Manila

Highlights
- Best Picture: Huk Sa Bagong Pamumuhay

The 2nd Filipino Academy of Movie Arts and Sciences Awards Night was held in 1954 in Life Theater, Quezon Boulevard, Quiapo, Manila. Huk Sa Bagong Pamumuhay, produced by Narcisa de Leon and distributed by LVN Pictures, is the recipient of FAMAS Award for Best Picture.

== Awards ==
Winners are listed first and highlighted with boldface.

| Best Picture | Best Director |
|---|---|
| Huk Sa Bagong Pamumuhay — Narcisa de Leon | **Lamberto V. Avellana — Huk Sa Bagong Pamumuhay** |
| Best Actor | Best Actress |
| Jose Padilla, Jr. — Huk Sa Bagong Pamumuhay | **Carmen Rosales — Inspirasiyon** |
| Best Supporting Actor | Best Supporting Actress |
| Leroy Salvador — Huk Sa Bagong Pamumuhay | **Katy de la Cruz — Inspirasiyon**; Carol Varga — Habang Buhay |
| Best Screenplay | Best Cinematography |
| Teodorico C. Santos — Habang Buhay | **Ricardo Marcelino — Habang Buhay** |
| Best Sound Engineering | Best Musical Score |
| Angelo Larraga — May Isang Tsuper ng Taksi | **Ariston Avelino — Habang Buhay** |
Best Editing
Antonio G. Verches — May Isang Tsuper ng Taksi
