= 1961 FAMAS Awards =

Award ceremony for Filipino films of 1960

9th FAMAS Awards
- Date: 1961
- Site: Philippines

Highlights
- Best Picture: Huwag mo Akong Limutin (Premiere Productions)
- Most awards: Huwag mo Akong Limutin (8 wins)
- Most nominations: Huwag mo Akong Limutin (12 nominations)

The 9th Filipino Academy of Movie Arts and Sciences Awards Night was held in 1961 for the Outstanding Achievements for the year 1960.

Huwag mo Akong Limutin of Premiere Productions, won the most awards with 8 wins including the most coveted FAMAS Award for Best Picture.

== Awards ==
=== Major Awards ===
Winners are listed first and highlighted with boldface.

Best Picture	Best Director
**Huwag mo Akong Limutin — Premiere Productions**; Gumuhong Bantayog — Sampaguita Pictures; Kadenang Putik — People's Pictures; Krus na Daan — Master Productions; Kung Ako'y Mahal Mo — LVN Pictures	**Gerardo de Leon — Huwag mo Akong Limutin**; Conrado Conde, Cesar Gallardo — Kadenang putik; Leroy Salvador — Krus na Daan; Gregorio Fernandez — Kung Ako'y Mahal Mo
Best Actor	Best Actress
**Efren Reyes — Kadenang putik**; Ronald Remy — Akin ang paghihiganti; Van De Leon — Gumuhong bantayog; Cesar Ramirez — Huwag mo akong Limutin; Fernando Poe, Jr. — Walang daigdig	**Charito Solis — Emily**; Marlene Daudén — Gumuhong bantayog; Cynthia Zamora— Huwag mo akong limutin; Tessie Quintana— Kadenang putik; Rita Gomez — Tatlong Magdalena
Best Supporting Actor	Best Supporting Actress
**Oscar Keesee — Huwag mo akong limutin**; Johnny Monteiro— Akin ang paghihiganti; Eddie Garcia— Gumuhong Bantayog; Bob Soler — Kadenang Putik; Lou Salvador Jr.— Krus na Daan	**Arsenia Francisco — Huwag mo akong limutin**; Carol Varga — Akin ang paghihiganti; Patria Plata — Emily; Barbara Perez — Gumuhong Bantayog; Mary Walter — Krus na Daan
Best in Screenplay	Best Story
**Cesar Amigo — Kadenang Putik**; Armando De Guzman — Gumuhong Bantayog; Gerardo de Leon, Jose Flores Sibal — Huwag mo akong Limutin; Armando De Guzman — Krus na Daan; Bert R. Mendoza — Condenado; Joseph de Cordova, Consuelo P. Osorio — Kung ako'y Mahal Mo	**Clodualdo Del Mundo Sr.— Kadenang Putik**; Francisco V. Coching — Gumuhong bantayog; Jose Flores Sibal — Huwag mo akong Limutin; Leroy Salvador — Krus na Daan; Joseph de Cordova — Kung ako'y mahal Mo
Best Sound Engineering	Best Musical Score
**Demetrio de Santos — Huwag mo akong Limutin**; Joseph Straight — Gumuhong Bantayog; Demetrio de Santos — Kadenang Putik; Demetrio de Santos — Krus na Daan; Enrique Bautista— Kung ako'y mahal Mo	**Tito Arevalo — Huwag mo akong limutin**; Danny Holmsen — Gumuhong Bantayog; Tony Maiquez — Kadenang putik; Tony Maiquez — krus na Daan; Polding Silos — Kung ako'y mahal mo
Best Cinematography	Best Editing
**Ricardo Marcelino — Huwag mo akong limutin**; Felipe Santiago — Gumuhong bantayog; Tommy Marcelino — Kadenang putik; Remegio Young — Kung ako'y mahal mo	**Victoriano Calub — Huwag mo akong limutin**; Atilano Salvador — Kadenang putik: Victoriano Calub — Krus na daan

=== Special Awardee ===
- **International Prestige Award of Merit** - '
  - **Bayanihan (LVN Pictures)**
  - **My Serenade (LVN Pictures)**
