= 1958 FAMAS Awards =

Annual Filipino film awards ceremony

6th FAMAS Awards
- Date: March 15, 1958
- Site: Fiesta Pavilion, Manila Hotel

Highlights
- Best Picture: Kalibre .45 (Premiere Productions)
- Most awards: Kalibre .45 (5 wins)
- Most nominations: Kalibre .45 (8 nominations)

The 6th Filipino Academy of Movie Arts and Sciences Awards Night was held on March 15, 1958, at Fiesta Pavilion of the historical Manila Hotel. This is for the Outstanding Achievements in films for the year 1957.

Kalibre .45 a film directed by Cesar Gallardo under Premiere Productions was the most nominated (8 nominations) and the most awarded (5 wins) film of FAMAS 1958 including the FAMAS Award for Best Picture.

== Awards ==
=== Major Awards ===
Winners are listed first and highlighted with boldface.

Best Picture	Best Director
**Kalibre .45 — Premiere Productions**; Kamay ni Cain — Peoples Picture; Krisalis — LVN Pictures; Sino ang Maysala — Sampaguita Pictures; Veronica — Sampaguita Pictures	**Cesar Gallardo — Kalibre .45**; Gregorio Fernandez — Hukom Roldan; Susana C. de Guzman — Krisalis; Armando Garces] — Sino ang Maysala; Conrado Conde — Taga sa bato
Best Actor	Best Actress
**Van de Leon — Taga sa Bato**; Danilo Montes — Kalibre .45; Efren Reyes — Kalibre .45; Jose Padilla Jr. — Objective: Patayin si Magsaysay: Rogelio de la Rosa — Veronica	**Paraluman — Sino ang Maysala**; Lolita Rodriguez — Busabos; Rita Gomez — Rubi-Rosa; Charito Solis — Krisalis; Cynthia Zamora — Wala ng Luha; Tita Duran — Yaya Maria
Best Supporting Actor	Best Supporting Actress
**Eddie Garcia — Taga sa Bato**; Quiel Segovia — Kalibre .45; Romeo Vasquez — Sino ang Maysala; Amado Cortez — Wala ng Luha; Oscar Keesee — Walang Sugat	**Etang Discher — Busabos**; Bella Flores — Busabos; Leonor Vergara — Kamay ni Cain; Patria Plata — Kandilang Bakal; Rebecca Del Rio — Krisalis
Best in Screenplay	Best Story
**Augusto Buenaventura — Walang Sugat**	**Fausto J. Galauran — Sino ang Maysala**
Best Sound Engineering	Best Musical Score
**Demetrio de Santos — Kalibre .45**	**Tony Maiquez — Yaya Maria**
Best Cinematography	Best Editing
**Mike Accion — Yaya Maria**	**Gervacio Santos — Kalibre .45**

=== Special Awardee ===
- **International Prestige Award of Merit**
  - **Anak Dalita** (LVN Pictures)
