= 1957 FAMAS Awards =

Annual Filipino film awards ceremony

5th FAMAS Awards
- Date: 1957
- Site: Fiesta Pavilion, Manila Hotel

Highlights
- Best Picture: Luksang Tagumpay (LVN Pictures)
- Most awards: Desperado (People's Pictures) (4 wins)
- Most nominations: Desperado (11 nominations)

The 5th Filipino Academy of Movie Arts and Sciences Awards Night was held in 1957 for the Outstanding Achievements for 1956 at Fiesta Pavilion in Manila Hotel.

Desperado of Peoples Picture ran away with the most wins (4) out of 11 nominations. However, it was Luksang Tagumpay by (LVN Pictures) who won the FAMAS Award for Best Picture.

== Awards ==
=== Major Awards ===
Winners are listed first and highlighted with boldface.

Best Picture	Best Director
**Luksang Tagumpay — LVN Pictures**; Desperado — Peoples Picture; Ang buhay at pag-ibig ni Dr. Jose Rizal — Balatbat and Bagumbayan Productions; Hokos Pokus — Premiere Productions; Kumander 13 — LVN Pictures	**Ramon Estella — Desperado**; Gerardo de Leon — Ang buhay at pag-ibig ni Dr. Jose Rizal; Armando Garces — Gilda; Lamberto V. Avellana — Kumander 13; Gregorio Fernandez — Luksang Tagumpay
Best Actor	Best Actress
**Eddie Del Mar — Ang buhay at pag-ibig ni Dr. Jose Rizal**; Efren Reyes — Desperado; Ruben Rustia. — Haring Tulisan; Jaime de la Rosa. — Kumander 13; Armando Goyena — Medalyong Perlas	**Lolita Rodriguez — Gilda**; Olivia Cenizal — Desperado; Delia Razon — Luksang tagumpay; Charito Solis — Ulilang Birhen; Rita Gomez — Via Dolorosa
Best Supporting Actor	Best Supporting Actress
**Ramon D'Salva — Desperado**; Eddie Garcia — Gilda; Joseph de Cordova — Kumander 13; Eddie Rodriguez — Luksang Tagumpay; Venchito Galvez — Tumbando Caña:	**Rosa Mia — Tumbando Caña**; Rebecca Del Rio — Luksang Tagumpay; Maria Cristina — Tumbando Caña; Rosa Aguirre — Ulirang Birhen; Letty Ojera — WalangP anginoon
Best in Screenplay	Best Story
Ding M. De Jesus Gerardo de Leon — Hating-Gabi: Ramon Estella — Desperado; Luciano B. Carlos — Gilda; Lamberto V. Avellana — Medalyong Perlas for segment Welga; Mike Velarde — Medalyong Perlas for segment Kapalaran	**Mike Velarde — Luksang Tagumpay**; Agustin dela Cruz — Desperado; Pablo S. Gomez — Gilda; Lamberto V. Avellana — Medalyong Perlas for segment Welga; Ding M. De Jesus — Hating-gabi
Best Sound Engineering	Best Musical Score
**Demetrio de Santos — Desperado**; Flaviano Villareal — Let Us Live; Joseph Straight — Gilda; Luis Reyes — Kumander 13; Ben Patajo — Luksang Tagumpay	**Tony Maiquez — Cinco hermanas**; Ariston Avelino — Desperado; Rodolfo Cornejo — Gilda; Francisco Buencamino Jr. — Kumander 13; Tito Arevalo — Saigon
Best Cinematography	Best Editing
**Remegio Young — Luksong Tagumpay**; Tommy Marcelino — Desperado; Steve Perez — Gilda; Hermo Santos — Haring Tulisan; Emmanuel I. Rojas — Let us Live	**Victoriano Calub — Desperado**; Jose Tarnate — Gilda; Enrique Jarlego — Luksang Tagumpay; Augusto Salvador — Haring Tulisan; Gregorio Carballo — Medalyong Perlas

=== Special Awardee ===
- **International Prestige Award of Merit**
  - **Badjao** (LVN Pictures)
