= Fely Crisóstomo =

Filipina film director and actress

Fely Crisostomo
- Born: May 11, 1914
- Died: July 2, 1980 (aged 66)
- Other names: Felicing
- Occupations: Director; Editor
- Spouse: Dolores Crisostomo

Felicismo 'Fely' Crisostomo (May 11, 1914 - July 2, 1980) was a Filipino film director and editor. He worked as a projectionist at both Savoy and Columbia theaters, Manila, and Camp John Hay, Baguio. He trained in laboratory and editing work as a still photographer for Manila Talkatone. He would eventually set up his own photo studio.

In 1958, he received the Filipino Academy of Movie Arts and Sciences (FAMAS) Best Editing award for Hanggang sa Dulo ng Daigdig (To the Ends of the Earth). He would win the FAMAS Best Editing award again in 1965 for Iginuhit sa Buhangin (Written on the Sand). In 1967, he won the FAMAS Best Director award for Kapag Puso'y Sinugatan (When the Heart is Wounded).

== Editor ==
- Back Door to Hell, 1964 (re-edited by Monte Hellman, but Crisostomo's name remains credited)[3]
- Hanggang sa Dulo ng Daigdig (1958) (To the Ends of the Earth)
- Iginuhit sa Buhangin (1965) (Written on the Sand)
- May Hangganan ang Pag-Ibig (1970) (Love Has Limits)
- Malupit na Tadhana (1971) (Cruel Fate)
- Liezl at ang Seven Hoods (1971) (Liezl and the Seven Hoods)
- Huwag Mong Kunin ang Lahat sa Akin (1976) (Do Not Take Everything from Me)
- Mapupulang Labi (1977) (Red Lips)

== Director ==
- Kutong lupa, 1976
- Gaano kita kamahal, 1968
- Kailanma'y di ka mag-iisa, 1968
- Oh! My Papa, 1968
- Kapag puso'y sinugatan, 1967 ("When the Heart is Wounded"'
- Segment in Katotohanan o guniguni, horror anthology, 1960 ("Fact or Fantasy")
