= Ang Pinakamagandang Hayop sa Balat ng Lupa =

- Written by: Glecilyn Roldan and Rafael Ma. Guerrero
- Starring: Gloria Diaz; Vic Vargas; Elizabeth Oropesa
- Distributed by: Gemini Films International
- Release date: 1974
- Country: Philippines
- Language: Tagalog

Ang Pinakamagandang Hayop sa Balat ng Lupa ("The Most Beautiful Creature on the Face of the Earth") is a 1974 Tagalog-language film from the Philippines. The story was written by Celso Ad. Castillo and screenplay written by Rafael Ma. Guerrero. The film stars Filipino actors Gloria Diaz (Miss Universe 1969 title holder), Vic Vargas, and Elizabeth Oropesa. The film was produced by Gemini Films International and was shot in Sicogon Island of Carles, Iloilo in the Western Visayas region of the Philippines.

== Plot ==
On a stormy night, a childless couple discovers a beautiful yet mysterious woman unconscious on the beach of their seaside village. Upon awakening, she introduces herself as Isabel, revealing her tragic past as an orphan who fled her uncle's attempted assault. The compassionate couple takes her in, sheltering her in their quiet home.

As Isabel's striking beauty captivates the townsfolk, especially the men, the women of the village begin to feel overshadowed and threatened. Friendships dissolve into bitter rivalries as the men compete for her attention. Sensing her power, Isabel cleverly manipulates this competition to pursue revenge against her uncle, even if it means sacrificing a close friend. The women, feeling scorned and betrayed, grow increasingly hostile towards her.

Amidst the chaos, Simon stands out; he sees through Isabel's facade, but paradoxically, he is also entranced by her. Unbeknownst to him, Isabel harbors feelings for Simon, despite his engagement to Saling, a local girl. Heartbroken and furious, Saling rallies the town's women to confront Isabel, leading to a violent clash that leaves Isabel nearly dead.

The men of the village subsequently defend Isabel. The conflict surrounding Isabel creates divisions within the town.

Simon was utterly enamored with Isabel, but Saling, overwhelmed by despair, drowned herself in the sea, driving her mother to madness. Meanwhile, the town simpleton murdered his adoptive parents when they forbade him from seeing Isabel, fearing her dark influence. The wife of the couple who took Isabel in killed her husband after discovering his obsession with the girl. Former friends turned enemies, suing each other out of jealousy over Isabel's allure. The church dwindled in attendance as congregants flocked to her like moths to a flame. Despite the chaos, Isabel revelled in the favors bestowed upon her, showing neither remorse nor regret.

Realizing his grave mistake, Simon likened Isabel to Eve, the deceiver, and Pandora, whose curiosity unleashed suffering. He escaped the town, seeking a new life away from Isabel's toxic presence. Left alone, Isabel felt life’s worthlessness without Simon. Desperate to draw him back, she searched for him, mistakenly believing the noise from his house was his presence. However, it was the now insane town simpleton who had planted a bag of dynamite used for illegal fishing. The explosion claimed his life along with Isabel's.

In a cruel twist of fate, it seemed as though heaven itself had intervened, ridding the world of Isabel's destructive charm.

The narrative illustrates how toxic masculinity distorts relationships, with men imposing ideals on women. Isabel's struggle reflects a loss of identity, defined by male perception. Insecurity among men leads to violence and turmoil, while Isabel’s madness highlights the psychological toll of societal pressures. The story advocates for nurturing connections based on mutual respect, emphasizing empathy in overcoming destructive patterns.

== Cast ==
- Gloria Diaz
- Ray Marcos
- Elizabeth Oropesa
- Lito Anzures
- Pedro Faustino
- Mario Escudero
- Ruel Vernal
- Ellen Esguerra
- Babsy Paredes
- Flordeliza Figueroa
- Vic Vargas (Special Participation)

== 1996 version ==
The 1996 remake of Ang Pinakamagandang Hayop sa Balat ng Lupa was also written by Celso Ad. Castillo and was produced by Royal Era and Viva Films. The 1996 film version starred Ruffa Gutierrez, Dindi Gallardo, and Dick Israel.
