= César Gallardo =

Uruguayan fencer

Personal information
- Born: 17 February 1896 Montevideo, Uruguay
- Died: 12 May 1988 (aged 92) Montevideo, Uruguay

Sport
- Sport: Fencing

César Gallardo (17 February 1896 – 12 May 1988) was a Uruguayan fencer. He competed in the team foil event at the 1948 Summer Olympics.
