= Ejercito =

Ejercito is a family name from the Philippines:

- Joseph Estrada - Born as Jose M. Ejercito, is an actor and the former president of the Philippines.
- Loi Ejercito - Real name Luisa Pimentel-Ejercito, is the wife of former president Joseph Estrada and the former First Lady of the Philippines.
- Jinggoy Estrada - Born as Jose P. Ejercito Jr., is an actor and former senator of the Philippines.
- JV Ejercito - Former senator of the Philippines.
- George Estregan - Born as Jesus Jorge M. Ejercito, an actor
- E. R. Ejercito - also known by the screen names "Jorge Estregan" and "George Estregan Jr.", is an actor and former politician.
- Gary Estrada - Real name Gary Jason B. Ejercito, an actor
- Gherome Ejercito - Basketball player

== See also ==
- Ejercito family, a Filipino acting and political dynasty.
