= List of Akin Pa Rin ang Bukas characters =

The following is a list of major, recurring, notable and minor characters appeared in Akin Pa Rin ang Bukas (internationally titled as Perfect Vengeance), a Filipino drama television series created and developed by Denoy Navarro-Punio and produced by GMA Network. The series premiered on September 9, 2013, on the network's prime time block, 8:45 p.m. time slot, and on September 11, 2013, worldwide via GMA Pinoy TV. The series is under the helm of Laurice Guillen, and Meann P. Regala serves as the executive producer for the entire run of the show.

The forty-five-minute scripted drama tells the story of Lovelia Villacorta (played by Poe), a woman who turns vengeful against the people who wronged her and will prove that she deserves equal rights and love like the rest, even if she were born out of wedlock.

== Main characters ==
The series featured eight main characters, with many other characters recurring throughout its run.

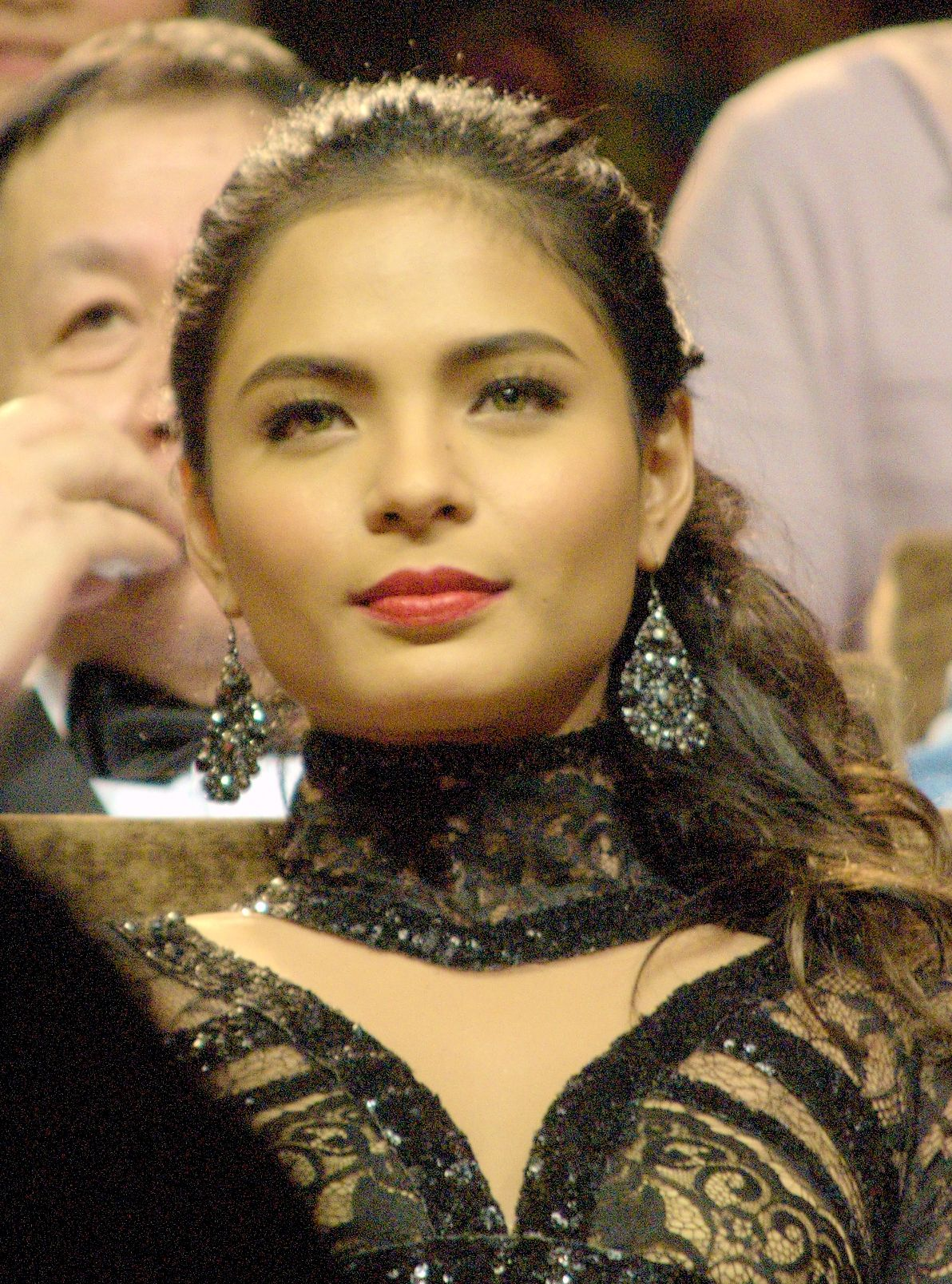
Poe plays the series' main protagonist, Lovelia Villacorta.

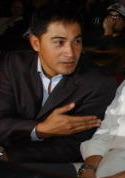
Montano portrays Conrad Alperos.

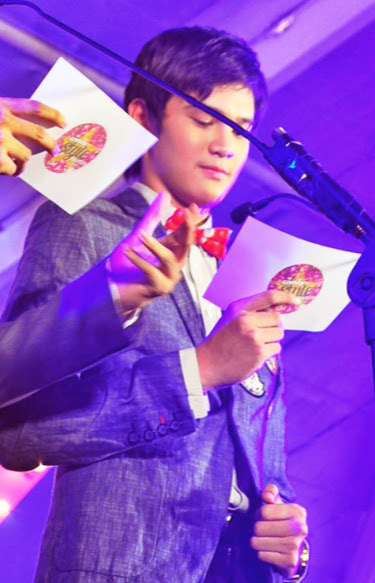
Madrid portrays Pineda's sister Junior Morales.

=== Lovelia Villacorta ===
Portrayed by Lovi Poe, the series' main protagonist. She is the bastard daughter of the wealthy Roel Villacorta to his former maidservant, Emma Ignacio. Lovelia works as creative director of "Empress Jewels", her family's jewelry business. Meek and conservative, Lovelia has a hard time living up to the standards set by her grandmother, Beatrice. Her being timid and insecure keep her from taking any stand. But after being deceived and betrayed, Lovelia emerges into a strong, dignified and cunning woman. Under the protective wing of Conrad Alperos, she begins to plot her revenge on those whom she once loved so much.

In the finale after being rescued by Jerry and to his own death, she visits both of her parents' grave and meets the spirit of her biological mother, Emma Ignacio who gives her good advice. After seeing her mother's spirit, Lovelia finally moves on with her life.

Poe did not have qualms accepting the role of Lovelia Villacorta, said that, "Who am I to say no to something this huge?" In an interview, Poe also admitted that she literally jumped for joy when she learned that she would be directed by Laurice Guillen in the series, and said "it's a dream come true. [...] Director Laurice motivated me by talking to me... we went through my personal experiences as we shot certain scenes."

=== Jerry Sandoval ===
Played by Rocco Nacino. Jerry is the love interest of Lovelia Villacorta. He is a college undergraduate and a good-for-nothing man. He is a professional con artist, a well-trained liar, intelligent, sweet-talker and crafty. Together with his long-time lover and partner-in-crime Agatha Morales, Jerry schemes to deceive both Lovelia and her father, Roel Villacorta. Jerry uses his wit and charm to gain Lovelia's trust, confidence and love, then later on, takes advantage of that trust in order to obtain his own personal interest. In the finale, Jerry was shot by Agatha when he shot her father, Brando during their ensuing gun fight.

In an interview, Nacino admitted that his role Jerry is a very challenging one. "[...] the character is actually protagonist-antagonist and this really makes the character very interesting. There's a lot of developments for the character in the course of the story."

=== Atty. Conrad Alperos ===
Portrayed by Cesar Montano. Conrad is the most trusted lawyer of Roel Villacorta—who happens to be the son of his mother's ex-husband, Don Jaime Villacorta. Conrad is intelligent, righteous, compassionate and charismatic. He is in a relationship with Jade Carmelo, but eventually falls in love with Lovelia and helps her to fight back against and avenge herself on the people who made her life miserable.

In an interview, Montano revealed that after the first sit down meeting with creative director Jun Lana, he immediately agreed to star on the series. He also stated that it was his desire to work again with director, Laurice Guillen, who was his director in the 1989 film Ang Bukas ay Akin, which he won his very first acting award, as one of the main reasons why he accepted the project.

=== Agatha Morales ===
Played by Charee Pineda. Agatha is Jerry's long-time lover and partner-in-crime and is the primary antagonist of the series. She is an ambitious and scheming woman who is willing to compromise her integrity and morals for her selfish motives. Agatha is so envious of the life that Lovelia leads and is determined to take everything away from her, including her family and the love of the man she has always longed for. In the finale, Agatha was shot dead by Tisoy when she shoots Jerry to death for killing her father in a gun fight.

=== Roel Villacorta ===
Portrayed by Gary Estrada. Roel is the one and only son and heir of Don Jaime and Señora Beatrice. He is the father of Lovelia Villacorta. He works as vice president of "Empress Jewels". Roel is described as happy-go-lucky and a simple-minded womanizer. But despite his fondness for beautiful and sexy women, Roel doesn't want to commit to a relationship, until he meets Agatha Morales. He eventually falls madly in love with her and thinks he's finally found the girl of his dreams—unaware of Agatha's true motives and full agenda. He was even killed, by Brando's servant, but led by Agatha.

=== Señora Beatrice Villacorta ===
Played by Liza Lorena. Beatrice is the matriarch of the Villacorta's, the second-wife of Jaime and mother to Roel. She is the owner and president of the famous "Empress Jewels", a (fictional) multinational luxury jewelry retailer. Beatrice is described as strict, perfectionist, domineering and arrogant woman. She loathes Lovelia for being her son's daughter to a lowly servant—which for her would bring shame on Villacorta's untainted reputation.

Lorena was originally assigned to play the role of Cristina Alperos. However, when Helen Gamboa, who supposed to be cast as Beatrice Villacorta, had to drop out of the series for "health reasons", the production decided to .

=== Doña Cristina Alperos ===
Portrayed by Gloria Romero. Cristina Alperos is the loving mother of Conrad Alperos. Ironically, Doña Cristina is the ex-wife of Don Jaime Villacorta.

Romero took the original role of Liza Lorena as Cristina Alperos, stated that she was hesitant to accept the said role when it was first offered to her. But after a meeting with the production people regarding the concept, story line, her character and "when they told me that the director will be Laurice Guillen, I immediately grabbed the project."

=== Jade Carmelo ===
Played by Solenn Heussaff. Jade a doctor and the ex-girlfriend of Conrad Alperos. Beautiful, sexy, intelligent, rich and strong-willed—Jade is the epitome of all female qualities desired by any man. However, lack of time due to her busy schedule (Jade is a doctor) strains her relationship with Conrad. When Conrad decides to break up with her, Jade goes berserk and take revenge on him and Lovelia.

The role of Jade Carmelo was originally offered to Alessandra de Rossi but she turned it down, and so it was given to Heussaff.

== Recurring characters ==
Below is the list of notables recurring roles during series.

- Emma Ignacio (portrayed by Ina Feleo). Emma is the loving mother of Lovelia Villacorta. She is a downhearted and self-sacrificing woman who is ready to give up her own happiness for the sake of her beloved daughter. Emma is last seen in the finale as a spirit who gives her daughter Lovelia some advice while she visits in her grave.
- Don Jaime Villacorta (portrayed by Freddie Webb). Don Jaime is the low profile husband of Beatrice and father to Roel. An extremely wealthy man, Don Jaime is a shipping magnate and owner of a chain of pawnshops. The character appeared only in the pilot episode. In the sixth episode of the series, it was revealed that the character died of heart attack.
- Brando Morales (portrayed by Kier Legaspi). Brando is Agatha and Junior Morales' father and a corrupt policeman. Brando was shot by Jerry.
- Junior Morales (portrayed by Ruru Madrid). Brando Morales, Jr. or simply Junior, is Agatha Morales' younger brother. A handcuffed; Junior also served as his sister's conscience.
- Jenny (portrayed by Glenda Garcia). Jenny is Señora Beatrice's trusted personal assistant, and somewhat a confidant and adviser to Lovelia.
- Nanay Selya (portrayed by Tia Pusit). Selya is the head servant at the Villacorta mansion.
- Doña Conchita (portrayed by Lolli Mara). Doña Conchita is the downhearted friend of Señora Beatrice.
- Tisoy (portrayed by Steven Silva). Tisoy is one of Jerry's buddies; also a good-for-nothing man.
- Ailyn Medrano (portrayed by Jan Marini). Ailyn is Emma Ignacio's best friend and confidante.
