= Ejercito family =

Filipino political and acting dynasty

- Filipino political family and acting family
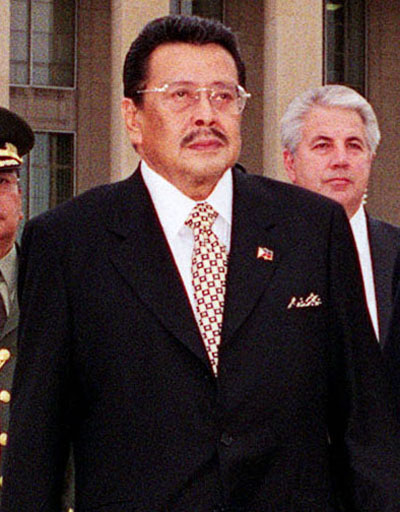
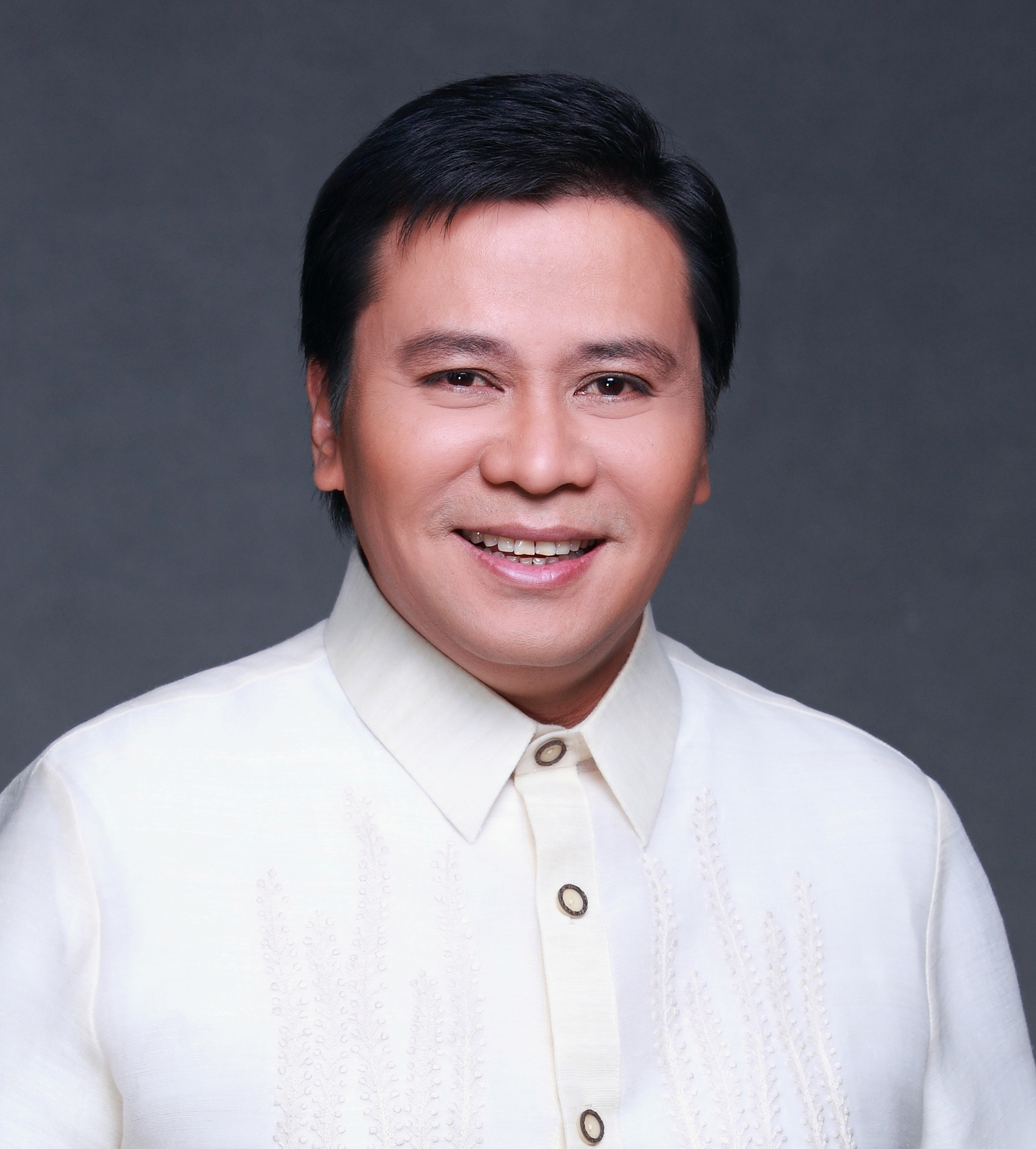
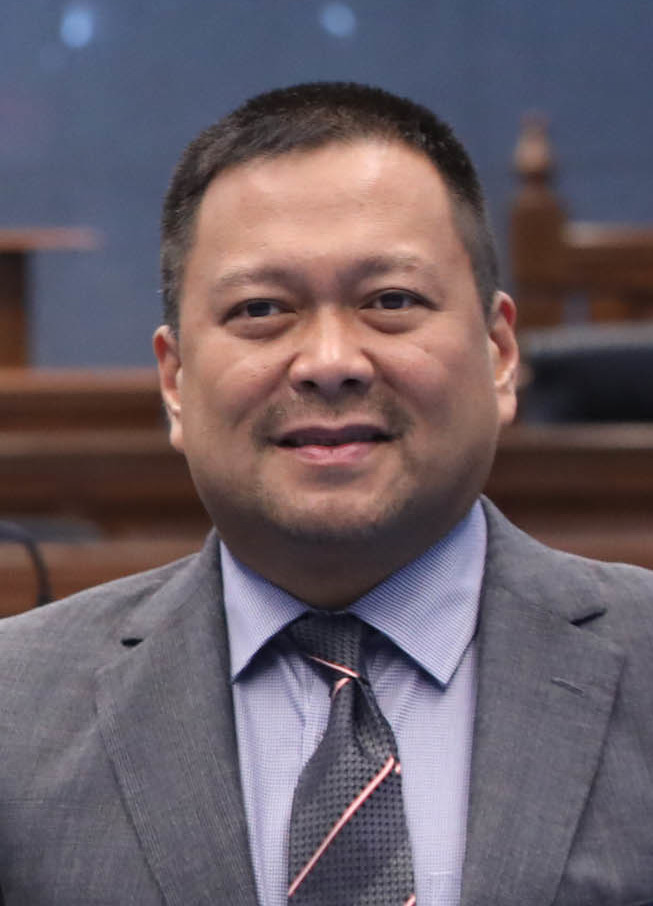
- Joseph Estrada Jinggoy Estrada JV Ejercito
- Country: Philippines
- Current region: Metro Manila
- Members: See table below
- Traditions: Roman Catholicism

The Ejercito family (Tagalog pronunciation: [ʔɛˌhɛːɾ.sɪˈto]) is a Filipino acting and political family.

== List of members ==
1. Emilio Ejercito Sr. (1899–1977), an engineer who became the first sanitary engineer of the City of Manila.
  1. ∞ married Maria Marcelo (1905-2009); they had ten children:
    1. Pilarica Ejercito (1927-2026)
    2. Emilio Ejercito Jr. (1929-1999)
    3. Paulino Ejercito (1931-2009)
    4. Patrocinio Ejercito (1933-2021)
    5. Antonio Ejercito (1933-2004)
    6. Connie Ejercito (born 1935)
    7. Marita Ejercito (born 1935)
    8. Joseph Estrada 13th president of the Philippines
      1. ∞ married Loi Ejercito, first lady turned senator, and had three children:
        1. Jinggoy Estrada, an actor and senator
          1. ∞ married Ma. Presentacion Vitug; they have four children:
            1. Janella Marie Ejercito
            2. Jolo Estrada, an actor
            3. Julian Estrada, an actor and DJ
            4. Julienne Ejercito, voice actor
        2. Jackie Ejercito
          1. ∞ married Beaver Lopez (annulled)
        3. Jude Estrada
          1. ∞ Rowena Ocampo
      2. with former actress Peachy Osorio, had:
        1. Joel Eduardo Ejercito
        2. Teresita Ejercito
      3. with Guia Gomez, former mayor of San Juan, had:
        1. JV Ejercito, senator
          1. ∞ married Hyacinth Lotuaco; they have;
            1. Julio Jose Ejercito
      4. with Larena, fathered
        1. Jason
      5. with former actress, Laarni Enriquez, had:
        1. Jerika Ejercito
        2. Jacob Ejercito
        3. Jake Ejercito
          1. with Andi Eigenmann, fathered
            1. Ellie Eigenmann
      6. with Joy Melendrez had;
        1. Joma Ejercito
    9. George Estregan (1939-1988)
      1. ∞ married Ramona Pelayo, and had:
        1. E.R. Ejercito, an actor and director
          1. ∞ married Maita Sanchez, they have four children:
            1. Eric Ejercito
            2. Jet Ejercito
            3. Jerico Ejercito
            4. Jhulia Ejercito
        2. Maria Georgina Ejercito
        3. Kurt Joseph Ejercito
        4. George Gerald Ejercito
      2. with actress and model Agnes Moran had:
        1. Gary Estrada, a congressman and actor
          1. ∞ married actress Bernadette Allyson; and they have:
            1. Garielle Bernice Ejercito
            2. Garianna Beatrice Ejercito
            3. Gianna Bettina Ejercito
          2. with actress Cheska Diaz had:
            1. Kiko Estrada who is also an actor
        2. Kate Gomez, an actress, mother of
          1. Rob Gomez who is also an actor
      3. father of former professional basketball player Gherome Ejercito
    10. Jesus Ejercito (born 1941)
