= FAMAS Award =

Annual Filipino awards for achievements in film

- Current: 2026 FAMAS Awards
- Awarded for: Excellence in cinematic achievements
- Country: Philippines
- Presented by: Filipino Academy of Movie Arts and Sciences
- First award: July 16, 1953; 73 years ago

Television/radio coverage
- Network: DZBB-AM, DZFM (1953); RPN (1985–2003); ABS-CBN (2004); GMA Network (2013)

The Filipino Academy of Movie Arts and Sciences Awards, or simply the FAMAS Awards, are the annual honors given by the Filipino Academy of Movie Arts and Sciences (FAMAS), an organization composed of writers and movie columnists, for achievements in Philippine cinema for a calendar year. Members of the academy including avid movie viewers, fans or enthusiasts cast their votes on who should win the statuettes in the different categories they were nominated. Established in 1952, it is the oldest existing film industry award-giving body in the Philippines and one of the oldest in Asia. The FAMAS Award, from 1952 to 1982, was the highest Filipino film award a filmmaker or artisan could receive in the local movie industry.

In 1982, the Philippine government mandated the creation of the Film Academy of the Philippines, whose Luna Awards are voted on by film professionals. FAMAS was afterwards unofficially regarded as secondary to the Luna Awards.

The FAMAS Award is one of the highly distinguished film award bodies in the country. Others included are the Luna Awards (Film Academy), the Gawad Urian Awards of the Manunuri ng Pelikulang Pilipino (Filipino Film Critics), and the Star Awards for Movies and Television by the Philippine Movie Press Club. Winning all four of the awards in one category for the same work is considered as winning a "Grand Slam".

The FAMAS was the sole award-giving body for film in the Philippines from 1952 until 1976. Within that period, FAMAS alone has awarded the most outstanding performers and craftsmen of Filipino films, from screen legend Rosa Rosal to master director Gerardo de Leon. Winning a FAMAS Award became the motivation for many film craftsmen, for it was the Philippines' only counterpart of the Oscars. The awards itself, then held mostly at the Manila Hotel, the oldest premiere hotel of Manila, became the biggest annual event in the Philippine movie industry.

== History ==
=== Maria Clara Awards ===
The forerunner of the FAMAS Award was the Maria Clara Awards, established by the Manila Times Publishing, Inc. under the tutelage of Alejandro Roces in 1951. The first awards in the Philippine movie industry were awarded for the movies of 1950-1951 and for the year 1952. The award statuette, which bore the figure of Maria Clara, a character in José Rizal's novel Noli Me Tangere, was sculpted by National Artist for Sculpture Guillermo Tolentino. For two years, the Maria Clara Awards honored the Philippine movie industry's cinematic achievements.

=== Establishment of FAMAS ===
Due to the complaints that the Maria Clara Awards were irrelevant because movie writers and not film artisans and filmmakers were the ones voting on the awards, seven writers (Flavio G. Macaso, Vic Generoso, Mario Mijares Lopez, Clemente Roxas, Paulo Dizon, Amado Yasoma and Eddie Infante) established the Filipino Academy of Movie Arts and Sciences. The FAMAS Awards formally replaced the Maria Clara Awards. In its inception, FAMAS had movie writers, columnists and studio publicists as its voting members.

The Filipino Academy of Movie Arts and Sciences bestows the FAMAS Award of Merit to individuals who have used their skills and craftsmanship to the best of their abilities for the development and creation of a Filipino motion picture. FAMAS was somewhat designed after the Academy of Motion Picture Arts and Sciences (AMPAS) of the United States and was originally named Academy of Motion Picture Arts and Sciences of the Philippines before AMPAS protested against the usage of their name.

=== First major controversy ===
In 1960, Sampaguita Pictures and Vera-Perez Productions withdrew their participation from the academy because the agreement between producers on who receives the FAMAS Awards was not followed. The agreement was that each of the Big Four studios (LVN Pictures, Sampaguita Pictures, Premiere Productions, and Lebran International) would receive the top awards. For example, if the Best Picture goes to one studio, the acting awards should go the other three studios and the directing award should go to another studio. The 1960 FAMAS Awards, nevertheless, failed to honor Sampaguita Pictures with an award, so Sampaguita Pictures and its sister company Vera-Perez Productions withdrew from the academy. In addition, Sampaguita's mogul, Jose Perez, returned all of the FAMAS Awards that the studio had won up to that point by placing them on public view in his Vera-Perez Gardens. Other movie studios also withdrew from the academy, though they did not return their statuettes. Because of this, in 1961, the FAMAS revamped its membership rules and removed studio representation membership, which left the FAMAS with solely movie writers and columnists.

=== Emergence of other awards ===
After a Best Actress tie controversy in 1973 which drew dissension from the public (see FAMAS Records below), FAMAS invited film critics as members of its nominating and awarding committee. These critics left FAMAS in 1976 to form the Manunuri ng Pelikulang Pilipino (MPP) (or the Filipino Film Critics) and subsequently established the Gawad Urian Awards.

The FAMAS's epithet, "Philippines' counterpart of the Oscars", was rescinded by the government in 1981, when it established the Film Academy of the Philippines (FAP) under Executive Order No. 640-A. The FAP was patterned after the AMPAS. FAP created awards which aims to counter FAMAS' which was embroiled back then in vote-buying and campaigning scandals. Other award-giving bodies have sprung up over the years, among the most notable are the Star Awards for Movies in 1985, the Catholic Mass Media Awards of the Catholic Church, the Young Critics Circle Film Desk in 1990, and recently, the Golden Screen Awards of the Entertainment Press.

=== Restructuring of 2003 ===
In 2003, the Best Actress Award of the 51st FAMAS Awards went to Aleck Bovick for a role in a "bold" (soft-porn) movie, Tampisaw, much to the chagrin of some people in the industry. Many people, including previous FAMAS winner Amalia Fuentes, felt FAMAS had killed itself when it gave a FAMAS to Bovick. Nevertheless, FAMAS did its own cleansing. FAMAS President Art Padua restructured the FAMAS by inviting more Palanca Award-winners (Pulitzer Prize of the Philippines) to the academy and dismissing members who have gone AWOL.

=== Leadership crisis and revocation of SEC ===
On May 6, 2003, due to non-compliance with reportorial requirements, the corporate charter of the FAMAS was revoked by the Securities and Exchange Commission (SEC). This move of the SEC gave FAMAS three years to wind-up its activities. This move also prohibited the staging of an awards night, which is the major activity of the FAMAS. Nevertheless, under the presidency of Art Padua, the FAMAS was able to stage the 52nd and 53rd FAMAS Awards.

In 2004, fifteen new members of the FAMAS were allowed by FAMAS president Art Padua to vote on the annual elections. This was questioned by some members of the FAMAS, some of which are lifetime members of the corporation, who then walked out of the election. FAMAS president Art Padua considered this as a resignation from the corporation, which sparked further unrest in the corporation.

On June 25, 2005, Col. Jimmy Tiu was elected unanimously by 34 of the 53 members of the FAMAS. Nevertheless, Art Padua did not acknowledge the results of the voting, and he considered the elected officers as the "FAMAS breakaway group". This leadership crisis would have a tremendous effect on the 54th FAMAS Awards.

In April 2006, the FAMAS, as represented by Art Padua, released the Official Nominees for the Awards, and on the next months had released the date and venue of the awards. On July 15, the day of the awards night, a 72-hour temporary restraining order was issued by Judge Felixberto Olalia of Manila Regional Trial Court against Art Padua and his set of officers from holding the 54th FAMAS Awards Night. The ruling favored Col. Tiu, the president of the breakaway group. The order was issued because, as presented by Col. Tiu, FAMAS ceased to exist as a registered organization of the Securities and Exchange Commission on May 26, 2003. As a SEC non-registered organization, all the FAMAS could do was to hold "winding-up activities" which does not include an awards night. This led to the postponement of the 54th FAMAS Awards night.

In order to go around the SEC restriction of holding the FAMAS Awards, FAMAS decided to resurrect the Maria Clara Awards in order to continue the long legacy of the still-beleaguered FAMAS and to continue awarding Filipino motion picture excellence. In holding the Maria Claras instead of the FAMAS, the FAMAS indeed does not hold its primary and only function, which is the holding of an awards night, which is not therefore a violation of the SEC ruling. The Maria Clara Awards were held on October 13, 2006, in a simple and humble event at Golden Fortune Restaurant in Manila. In retrospect, the FAMAS would not be awarded until the leadership crisis and the registration revocation issues of the corporation are not resolved.

Nevertheless, the group of Art Padua still held the 54th FAMAS Awards on November 12, 2006, at the Main Hall of the National Broadcasting Network Building in Quezon City, despite the SEC ruling against holding an awards night. The awards night set a trend because it is the first awards night in Philippine history to be shown as a feature of another TV program (Pilipinas, Ngayon Na of NBN Channel 4) instead of being a television special.

In 2007, just right before the 55th FAMAS Awards, the Supreme Court of the Philippines finally resolved the leadership crisis of FAMAS and handed the leadership to Art Padua, who is currently the longest-reigning president in the history of the academy. An appeal to the Court of Appeals by Col. Tiu is still pending though.

=== Present ===
In 2017, FAMAS partnered with MEGAVISION, headed by Donna Sanchez, to uplift the aging award-giving body. The challenge was to reinvent and rebrand FAMAS to fit into the 21st century.

Award-winning screenwriter Ricardo "Ricky" Lee, agreed to be the jury chairman. Under his leadership, an independent jury of respected film practitioners and academicians was created. There were separate juries for feature-length movies, short films and documentaries, totaling to sixteen (18) juries previewed almost two hundred films.

The nominees were feted at a Nominees' Victory Celebration held on May 22, 2018. Each nominee received a personalized citation and made them all feel like winners. The FAMAS thus became a celebration (and not a competition) of Filipino film artists for cinematic excellence.

The 66th FAMAS Gabi ng Parangal hosted by Piolo Pascual, Kim Chiu and Robi Domingo was held on June 10, 2018, at the Theater at Solaire. Among the highlights and memorable moments included: Lav Diaz, the internationally renowned director for more than two decades, receiving the Lifetime Achievement Award presented by Charo Santos, the independent film "Balangiga: Howling Madness" winning Best Picture, the announcement of the First Place Grand Jury Prize for "Tu Pug Imatuy" and the Second Grand Jury Prize for "Respeto;" the introduction of the Best Adapted Screenplay category, won by "Changing Partners".

The 67th FAMAS Gabi ng Parangal was hosted by Xian Lim and was held on April 28, 2019, at the Meralco Theater, Pasig. This year marked the celebration of 100 years in Philippine cinema. This momentous occasion in the film industry called for a special edition FAMAS trophy entitled "Centum Maria". Moreover, recognition of female icons in the film industry, in line with the worldwide "We Too" movement, such as Lifetime Awardees: Charo Santos-Concio, Laurice Guillen, Marilou Diaz-Abaya. Other highlights of the awards night were the winners of Best Picture, Gusto Kita With All My Hypothalamus and Special Jury Award Ang Panahon ng halimaw; Best Documentary Film All Grown Up; Best Short Film Siyudad sa Bulawan (City of Gold) and Special Jury Award Balai (Home); Best Director, Dwein Baltazar of Gusto Kita With All My Hypothalamus; Best Actor Eddie Garcia of ML & Victor Neri of A Short History of A Few Bad Things and Best Actress, Nadine Lustre of Never Not Love You.

In the decades following the 1961 membership restructuring, the FAMAS Awards remained a prominent fixture in Philippine cinema, though its prestige increasingly faced competition from newer, critic-led award bodies such as the Gawad Urian (established in 1976). In recent years, the organization has occasionally drawn media scrutiny over its category structures; notably, the 74th FAMAS Awards in October 2026 sparked public debate after awarding separate trophies for "Best Actress" (to Maricel Soriano) and "Actress of Distinction" (to Maris Racal), which commentators criticized as a duplicate acting honor.

== The statuette ==
The FAMAS Award of Merit statuette was modeled from the movie legend and FAMAS Award-winner Rosa Rosal. The varnished gold-painted wood statuette boasts of a Balintawak-clad woman whose raised hands hold a four-spoke film reel. She stands on a black cylindrical pedestal, which is encircled with a thin gold leaf that bears the initials and full name of FAMAS in big black letters, the awards ceremony, the category in which it was won, the name of the winner, the place where it was given and the signature of the FAMAS President. The statuette design itself has never changed over the years. The figure was designed by Manuel Barreiro.

== Ceremonies ==
The FAMAS' Parangal ng Sining (Awards Night), launched in April 2023, is an annual event that aims to recognize film industry icons and pioneers for their significant contribution to the world of Philippine cinema and local heritage.

The Gabi ng Parangal has been hosted by various locations such as the Manila Hotel, Araneta Coliseum, the Cultural Center of the Philippines and the Manila Hilton Hotel, to name a few. It has also been carried by different television networks such as RPN-9 and ABS-CBN 2. It was televised live from the carrier station until the 21st century, when it was aired at delayed telecasts due to difficulties in airing the program live.

== Categories ==
=== Current awards ===
==== Merit awards ====
- Best Picture: since 1952, divided into Best Drama Picture, Best Comedy Picture and Best Action Picture in 1988
- Best Director: 1952 to present
- Best Screenplay: 1952 to present
- Best Story: 1952 to present
- Best Actor: 1952 to present
- Best Actress: 1952 to present
- Best Supporting Actor: 1952 to present
- Best Supporting Actress: 1952 to present
- Best Child Performance, sometimes separated as Best Child Actor (1955 to present) and Best Child Actress (1963 to present)
- Best Cinematography: 1952 to present, divided into Black-and-White and Color categories before the 1970s
- Best Art Direction/Best Production Design: 1952 to present
- Best Editing: 1952 to present
- Best Sound: 1952 to present, as Best Sound Engineering during the FAMAS' early years
- Best Musical Score: 1952 to present
- Best Theme Song: 1963 to present
- Best Visual Effects: 1984, 1997 to present
- Best Special Effects: 1997 to present

==== Special awards ====
The FAMAS also awards thirteen special awards, the most for any award-giving body in the Philippines. These awards, except for the Hall of Fame, Circle of Excellence, Natatanging Alagad ng Sining and Huwarang Bituin ng FAMAS awards, are awarded annually:

- FAMAS Hall of Fame Award is bestowed to a person who has won five FAMAS Awards in a certain category.
- FAMAS Circle of Excellence Award is the highest award the FAMAS can bestow on an individual, given to a Hall of Fame inductee who had given a performance that was worthy of a FAMAS Award.
- FAMAS Lifetime Achievement Award is given to motion picture performers and artisans who have made indelible and lifelong contributions to the development of the Filipino motion picture industry, and first awarded in 1989.
- FAMAS Grand Award is given to an individual or an organization who have supported and helped the FAMAS throughout the years and was first awarded in 2005.
- Attorney Flavio G. Macaso Memorial Award is awarded to FAMAS members who have shown utmost loyalty and service to the academy. Named in honor of the first president of the academy, it was first awarded in 1998.
- Dr. Jose Perez Memorial Award for Journalism is given to managers, public relations officers, entertainment columnists and starbuilders who have demonstrated great mastery and professionalism in handling the biggest stars of the Philippine movie industry, as well as advancing the state of the Filipino motion picture industry through the use of journalism. The award was named after the Sampaguita Pictures' mogul. It was first awarded in 1984, and from 1997 to present.
- Fernando Poe, Jr. Memorial Award is given to an outstanding action movie star whose overflowing charisma, great physique and loyal following in the action genre has made him a great icon of the genre. It was named in honor of the King of Philippine movies, Fernando Poe, Jr.
- German Moreno Youth Achievement Award is given to a pair of young male and female stars who have shown great promise as a motion picture artisan and actor in the past calendar year. Award is decided by German Moreno, one of Philippine show business' best known talent discoverer and developer.
- Golden Artist Award is given to performers who have gained local recognition for their cinematic and/or artistic excellence.
- International Artist Award
- Posthumous Award gives recognition to recently deceased motion picture artisans' exemplary achievements in the motion picture industry. First awarded in 2007.
- Presidential Award gives recognition to an individual who has helped the cause of the FAMAS or of the motion picture industry as a whole greatly on a certain calendar year or any given time through any way possible.
- Special Citation Award: given to certain individuals' exemplary achievements in the performing arts and the motion picture industry, whose achievements may or may not be a contribution to the motion picture industry but to the arts as a whole.
- Dolphy Memorial Award gives recognition to an individual who has helped a lot in the development of FAMAS and the comedic arts. Named in honor of Dolphy, and the award itself is presented by his family.

=== Retired awards ===
- Best Featurette (1955)
- Best Short Film (1958)
- Lou Salvador Sr. Memorial Award was given to an actor for their career in comedy films. Awarded from 1998 to 2004.
- Huwarang Bituin ng FAMAS Award honored an actor for a long career in Philippine cinema. Awarded from 2002 to 2003, and in 2009.
- Dr. Ciriaco Santiago Memorial Award honored performers and directors of productions that gained international recognition. The award, named after the studio chief of Premiere Productions, was awarded in 1958, 1963, and from 1998 to 2000.
- International Prestige Award of Merit was given to Filipino film productions that received international recognition. The award was given in 1957, 1958 and 1961.
- Gregorio Valdez Memorial Award
- Filipino Academy of Movie Arts and Sciences Special Award was given to honor an individual's achievement in Philippine cinema.

=== One-time FAMAS awards ===
- Centennial Award was given in the 46th FAMAS Awards (1997) in 1998 to films that honestly reflected Philippine culture and traditions in its entirety and celebrated patriotism, in celebration of the centennial of Philippine independence. The winners of the award were Rizal sa Dapitan (1997) and Damong Ligaw (1997).
- Bukas Palad Award was given in the 47th FAMAS Awards (1998) in 1999 to honor the generosity and indelible contributions of the Philippines' original Queen of Talk, gossip columnist and TV host Inday Badiday, to the Philippine motion picture industry.
- Bituin ng FAMAS Mula Noon Hanggang Ngayon Award was given in the 50th FAMAS Awards (2001) in 2002 as a part of its Golden Jubilee celebration. This was given to former FAMAS winner Dolphy, as a recognition of his almost six decades in show business, his indelible contribution to the Philippine motion picture industry and his status as the Philippine King of Comedy
- Natatanging Alagad ng Sining Award was given in 2004 to honor the achievements of the King of Philippine Movies, Fernando Poe, Jr., who died just six months prior to the awards ceremony.

== FAMAS Hall of Fame ==
Best Directors

- Eddie Garcia (1991)
- Lino Brocka (1992) (Note: Posthumous award. Brocka died in 1991.)

Best Actors

- Joseph Estrada (1983)
- Fernando Poe Jr. (1988)
- Christopher De Leon (1993)
- Eddie Garcia (2004)
- Allen Dizon (2022)

Best Actress

- Charito Solis (1985)
- Vilma Santos (1990)
- Nora Aunor (1992)

Best Screenplay

- Eddie Romero (1986)

Best Supporting Actor

- Eddie Garcia (1975)

Best Story

- Carlo J. Caparas (2012)

Best Editing

- Edgardo Vinarao (1994)
- Jess Navarro (2022)

Best Musical Score

- George Canseco (1989)
- Jesse Lucas (2010)

Best Producer

- Joseph Estrada (1983)

Best Sound Recording

- Angel Avellana (1982)

Best Cinematographer

- Carlo Mendoza (2015)

== FAMAS records ==
- In 1973, FAMAS awarded the first tie in the history of Philippine cinema. The tie was in the Best Actress category, with both Boots Anson-Roa and Vilma Santos sharing the honors.
- Dawn Zulueta is the only person in Philippine movie history to ever bag two acting awards in a single ceremony from any awards night, having won the Best Actress award for the film Hihintayin Kita sa Langit and Best Supporting Actress award for Una Kang Naging Akin at the 1992 FAMAS Awards.
- Eddie Garcia is the only individual inducted in three Hall of Fame categories: Best Actor, Best Supporting Actor, and Best Director. Before 2019, Eddie Garcia was not eligible to be nominated for further FAMAS acting awards because of this, but after a rules change, he was nominated and won his last FAMAS Award in 2019 for Best Actor.
- Eddie Garcia won the Best Actor and Best Supporting Actor awards more than any actors with 6 wins on each category.
- Three actors have won the award consecutively. They are Christopher De Leon (in 1991 and 1992), Allen Dizon (in 2010 and 2011), and ER Ejercito (in 2012, 2013 and 2014)
- The longest FAMAS Awards telecast was in 2002 when FAMAS celebrated its golden jubilee. The awards night, which was held at the FAMAS Awards' original home, the Manila Hotel, was held from 9 PM to 3 AM.
- The first major acting award for a role in a "bold" (soft-porn) movie was awarded in the 2003 FAMAS Awards to Aleck Bovick for the movie Tampisaw. (See Restructuring of 2003 above)
- For the 53rd FAMAS Awards (2004), FAMAS partnered with the ABS-CBN Channel 2 for the production of the annual awards night on June 26, 2005. As a result, the show became the first awards night in the Philippines to be telecast all over the world through its international subsidiary station, The Filipino Channel.

=== Superlatives ===
Superlative	Record holder	
Actress with most awards	Charito Solis; Vilma Santos; Nora Aunor	5
Actress with most Circle of Excellence awards	Vilma Santos	4
Actress with most nominations	Nora Aunor	17
Actress with most nominations without ever winning	Bea Alonzo	6
Oldest Winner	Gloria Romero	67
Oldest Nominee	Gloria Romero	67
Youngest Winner	Vilma Santos; Sharon Cuneta	19
Youngest Nominee	Vivian Velez	16
Actor with most awards	Eddie Garcia	12 (6 for Best Actor and 6 for Best Supporting Actor)
Actor with most nominations	Fernando Poe Jr.	15
Oldest Winner	Armando Goyena	80
Oldest Nominee	Armando Goyena	80
Youngest Winner	Christopher De Leon	19
Youngest Nominee	Cogie Domingo	16
Performer with most consecutive nominations	Nora Aunor	15
Director with most awards	Gerardo de Leon	7
Director with most nominations	Gerardo de Leon; Lino Brocka	14
Director with most nominations without ever winning	Armando Garces	11
Oldest Winner	Eddie Garcia	69
Youngest Winner	Lino Brocka	32
Most consecutive wins	Gerardo de Leon	3
Most consecutive nominations	Cesar Gallardo	10
