= Joseph Estrada =

President of the Philippines from 1998 to 2001

- Official portrait, 1998

13th President of the Philippines
- In office June 30, 1998 – January 20, 2001
- Vice President: Gloria Macapagal Arroyo
- Preceded by: Fidel V. Ramos
- Succeeded by: Gloria Macapagal Arroyo

9th Vice President of the Philippines
- In office June 30, 1992 – June 30, 1998
- President: Fidel V. Ramos
- Preceded by: Salvador Laurel
- Succeeded by: Gloria Macapagal-Arroyo

26th Mayor of Manila
- In office June 30, 2013 – June 30, 2019
- Vice Mayor: Isko Moreno (2013–2016); Honey Lacuna (2016–2019)
- Preceded by: Alfredo Lim
- Succeeded by: Isko Moreno

18th Secretary of the Interior and Local Government
- In office June 30, 1998 – April 12, 1999
- President: Himself
- Preceded by: Sonny Collantes (OIC)
- Succeeded by: Ronaldo Puno

Chairman of the Presidential Anti-Crime Commission
- In office 1992–1997
- President: Fidel V. Ramos

Senate Minority Leader
- In office July 27, 1987 – August 17, 1987
- Preceded by: Position re-established (last held by Gerardo Roxas)
- Succeeded by: Juan Ponce Enrile

Senator of the Philippines
- In office June 30, 1987 – June 30, 1992

14th Mayor of San Juan
- In office August 5, 1969 – March 26, 1986
- Vice Mayor: Pablo T. Angeles (1969–1975)
- Preceded by: Braulio Santo Domingo
- Succeeded by: Reynaldo San Pascual

Personal details
- Born: Jose Marcelo Ejercito; April 19, 1937 (age 89) Tondo, Manila, Philippine Commonwealth
- Party: PMP (since 1991)
- Other political affiliations: See list: UNA (2012–2015); UNO (2005–2010); LAMMP (1997–2001); NPC (1991–1997); Liberal (1987–1991); KBL (1980–1986); Nacionalista (1971–1980); KBF (1967–1971)
- Spouse: Luisa Pimentel (m. 1959)
- Children: 10 (incl. Jose Jr., Joseph Victor, Jude and Juan Emilio)
- Parents: Emilio Ejercito Sr. (father); Maria Marcelo (mother)
- Relatives: Ejercito family, George Estregan (Brother)
- Education: Mapúa Institute of Technology; Polytechnic Colleges of the Philippines
- Occupation: Politician; actor
- Profession: Businessman
- Criminal information
- Status: Pardoned on October 26, 2007 by President Gloria Macapagal Arroyo
- Criminal charge: Plunder
- Penalty: Reclusión perpetua

Joseph Ejercito Estrada KGCR ([ʔɛˌhɛːɾ.sɪˈto ʔɛsˈtɾaː.dɐ]; born Jose Marcelo Ejercito; April 19, 1937), also known by the nickname Erap, (Note: "Erap" is a reverse of "pare", which means "pal" or "buddy" in Filipino.) is a Filipino retired politician and former actor who served as the 13th president of the Philippines from 1998 until his removal from office in 2001. He served as the 14th mayor of San Juan from 1969 to 1986, the ninth vice president under Fidel V. Ramos from 1992 to 1998, and the 26th mayor of Manila, the country's capital, from 2013 to 2019. His presidency was the third-shortest in Philippine history, after Emilio Aguinaldo and Sergio Osmeña.

Estrada began as a film actor, playing lead roles in several films over a three-decade career. In 1974, he established the Movie Workers Welfare Foundation (Mowelfund) to provide welfare for film workers. He entered politics in 1967 upon running for mayor of San Juan, serving from 1969 until his removal from office in the aftermath of the 1986 EDSA Revolution against President Ferdinand Marcos. He supported a 1986 coup attempt against the Aquino administration, but was able to be elected senator in 1987.

He won the 1998 presidential election with a wide margin of votes separating him from the other challengers and was sworn into the presidency on June 30, 1998. As president, Estrada concurrently served as the Secretary of the Interior and Local Government in his initial 10 months. In 2000, he declared an "all-out-war" against Moro Islamic Liberation Front and captured its headquarters and other camps. Allegations of corruption spawned an impeachment trial in the Senate, with Estrada becoming the first chief executive in Asia to be formally impeached. On January 16, 2001, the prosecution walked out from the impeachment court after the Senate narrowly voted against the disclosure of Estrada's bank records. On January 20, Estrada was removed from office by the Second EDSA Revolution; his vice president, Gloria Macapagal Arroyo, assumed the presidency. After his arrest alongside his son Jinggoy on April 25, 2001, on charges of plunder, his supporters rallied and marched to Malacañang Palace and attempted to storm the premises in EDSA III.

In September 2007, Estrada was sentenced by a special division of the Sandiganbayan to reclusión perpetua under a charge of plunder for the embezzlement of the US$80 million from the government; a month later, Estrada was granted a pardon by President Arroyo after he agreed not to seek public office. However, he later ran in the 2010 presidential election and lost to Noynoy Aquino, placing second after receiving 9.5 million votes or 26.3% of the popular vote. Estrada served as the mayor of Manila for two terms, from 2013 to 2019, becoming the first former president to be elected into a lower level of office after their presidency.

== Early life and education ==
Joseph Estrada was born as Jose Marcelo Ejercito at 8:25 pm on April 19, 1937 in his home in Tondo, an urban district of Manila. His family later moved to the wealthy suburb of San Juan, then a municipality in the province of Rizal. He belonged to a wealthy family and was the eighth of ten children of Engr. Emilio A. Ejercito Sr. (1899–1977) and his wife, Maria Marcelo (1906–2009). After graduating from the Ateneo Elementary School in 1951, he was expelled during his second year of high school at Ateneo for defending his classmate, Mario Tiaoqui, from being bullied in a restroom by a burly American named Patrick Hilton; Tiaoqui later became manager of Petrophil Corp. (now Petron) in the late 1970s and energy secretary during Estrada's presidency. Both Estrada and Hilton were expelled, with Estrada not being invited to any school reunions at Ateneo until his vice presidency in 1992. He and Hilton later struck a friendship during the school reunions. Estrada graduated high school at the Mapúa Institute of Technology (MIT), and during college, he enrolled in Bachelor of Science in Civil Engineering at the MIT to please his father. He would leave once again and transferred to Polytechnic Colleges of the Philippines (PCP) College of Engineering but dropped out to pursue films.

Estrada's first partner was his St. John's Academy schoolmate Mercedita "Ditas" Carmona, whom he began dating at the age of 15. Estrada was alleged to have nearly lost his life defending himself against a knife attack in the mid-1950s, being rushed to the North General Hospital in Manila after the incident.

== Film career ==
In his twenties, Ejercito began a career as an actor, usually playing the role of the villain/antagonist. He adopted the stage name "Joseph Estrada", as his mother objected to his chosen career and his decision to quit schooling multiple times; the surname "Estrada" was claimed to have been taken from a phone book. He also acquired the nickname "Erap" (a play on the Tagalog slang "pare", meaning 'buddy') from his friend, fellow actor Fernando Poe Jr.

Estrada gained popularity as a film actor, playing the lead role in over a hundred films in an acting career spanning some three decades.

In 1974, Estrada founded the Movie Workers Welfare Foundation (Mowelfund), which helps filmmakers through medical reimbursements, hospitalization, surgery and death benefits, livelihood, alternative income opportunities, and housing. Its educational arm, the Mowelfund Film Institute, has produced some of the most skilled and respected producers, filmmakers, writers, and performers in both the independent and mainstream sectors of the industry since its inception in 1979. He also headed, together with chief censor Guillermo de Vega, the first Metro Manila Film Festival in 1975, in which he won the Best Actor award for his self-produced film Diligin Mo ng Hamog ang Uhaw Na Lupa.

== Entry into politics ==
=== Mayor of San Juan (1969–1986) ===
Estrada entered politics in 1967, running for mayor of San Juan, failing and only succeeding in 1969 after winning an electoral protest against Braulio Sto. Domingo. His administration achieved many infrastructure developments. These included the establishment of the first Municipal High School, the Agora complex, a modern slaughterhouse, a sprawling government center with a post office, a mini-park, and the paving of 98 percent of the town's roads and alleys.

As mayor, he paid particular attention to the elementary education of children by improving and renovating school buildings, constructing additional school structures, health centers, barangay halls, and playgrounds in all barangays, and providing artesian wells to areas with low water supply. He relocated some 1,800 squatter families out of San Juan to Taytay, Rizal, at no cost. He was also the first mayor to computerize the assessment of the Real Estate Tax at the Municipal Assessor's Office.

When Corazon Aquino assumed the presidency after the People Power Revolution in February 1986, all elected officials of the local government, including Estrada, were removed to be replaced by appointed officers-in-charge. Estrada himself had been seen as too close to the ousted Marcos administration, but his removal was delayed due to his refusal to leave, as well as the demonstrations by San Juan residents around city hall in March and April 1986. Although he later expressed willingness to step down, Estrada, even with the support of actor Fernando Poe Jr. and police general Alfredo Lim, was unsuccessful in convincing the demonstrators to disassemble. On April 14, Lim moved in with his armed officers to forcibly disperse the crowd; one Estrada supporter, Manuel Dimiao, was hit in the head by a rock and died a day later from his injury. Estrada was replaced by Reynaldo San Pascual, while San Juan police chief Enrique Aguinaldo was relieved from his position for failing to "exercise enough prudence and restraint".

In July 1986, when the Arturo Tolentino-led coup attempt at the Manila Hotel was ongoing, Estrada entered the building and expressed his support for the generals participating in the coup.

=== Senator of the Philippines (1987–1992) ===
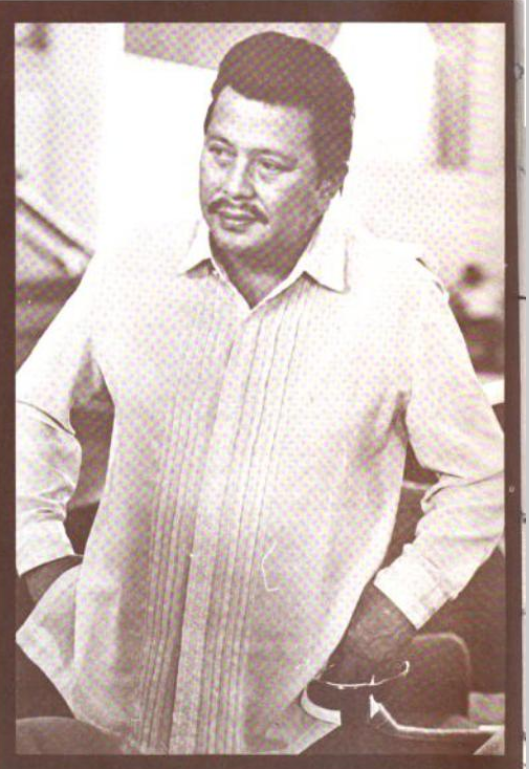
Estrada as a senator, photograph released by the Philippine Congress, c. 1988

In 1987, Estrada was recruited to the Eva Estrada Kalaw-led wing of the Liberal Party, and was listed as one of the faction's six nominees for the Senate election in May. He ultimately won a seat in the Senate as one of only two successful candidates from the Grand Alliance for Democracy (GAD) coalition, placing 14th in the election (out of 24 winners). He was appointed Chairman of the Committee on Public Works. He was Vice-Chairman of the Committees on Health, Natural Resources and Ecology, and Urban Planning.

In the Senate, Estrada sponsored bills on irrigation projects and the protection and propagation of the carabao, the beast of burden in the rural areas.

Estrada and eleven other senators (dubbed the "Magnificent 12" in media coverage) voted to terminate the RP-US Military Bases Agreement in 1991, leading to the withdrawal of American servicemen from the Clark Air Base in Pampanga and the Subic Naval Base in Zambales.

In 1989, the Free Press cited him as one of the Three Outstanding Senators of the Year. He was conferred the degree of Doctor of Humanities, Honoris Causa by the University of Pangasinan in 1990, and by the Bicol University in April 1997.

== Vice presidency (1992–1998) ==
Oath taking as vice president of the Philippines on June 30, 1992

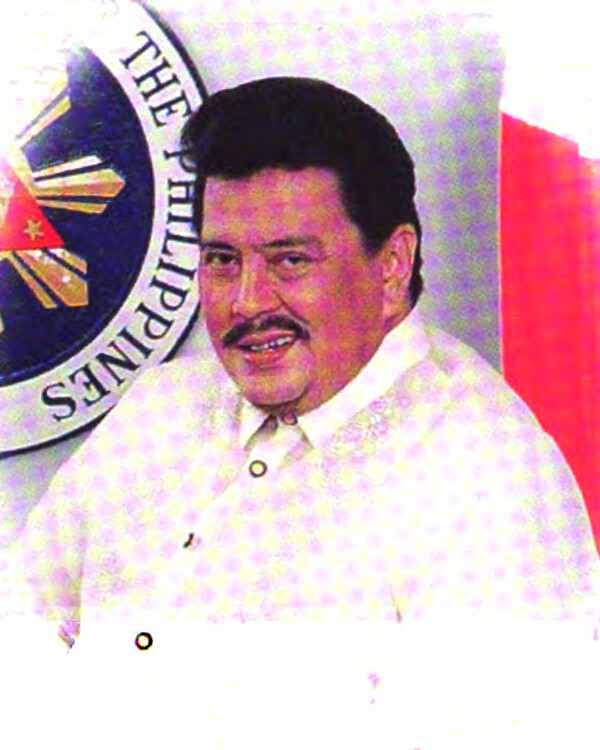
Official portrait, 1997

In 1992, Estrada initially ran for president under the Partido ng Masang Pilipino (PMP), with Vicente Rivera Jr. as his running mate and fellow actor Fernando Poe Jr. as his campaign manager. The Philippine film industry called for a 60-day "moratorium" on all film projects by March for industry figures to help Estrada's presidential campaign. However, Estrada reluctantly withdrew his bid on March 30 due to financial issues and instead became the running mate of Eduardo Cojuangco Jr. under the Nationalist People's Coalition; Estrada expressed that the decision was "very painful, if not traumatic". Though Cojuangco lost to former National Defense Secretary Fidel V. Ramos for the presidency, Estrada won the vice-presidency garnering more votes than his closest opponent Marcelo Fernan, Ramon Mitra Jr.'s running mate.

As vice president, Estrada was the chair of President Ramos' Presidential Anti-Crime Commission (PACC). Estrada arrested criminal warlords and kidnapping syndicates. He repeatedly topped surveys on government officials' performance conducted by the Social Weather Stations within his first two years as vice president and was named "Man of the Year" by ABS-CBN for 1993. He resigned as chair in 1997.

In the same year Estrada, together with former president Corazon Aquino, Cardinal Jaime Sin, Senator Gloria Macapagal Arroyo, and other political leaders, led an anti-charter change rally that brought in an estimated half a million people to Rizal Park against the charter change moves by Ramos and his supporters.

In early 1993, Estrada established Club 419 (later the International Business Club) in Cafe Ysabel within San Juan as a private men's club for him and his friends, including Poe. Estrada announced his presidential candidacy in 1997 and was endorsed by religious organisation Iglesia ni Cristo (INC).

== Presidency (1998–2001) ==
Presidential styles of Joseph Ejercito Estrada
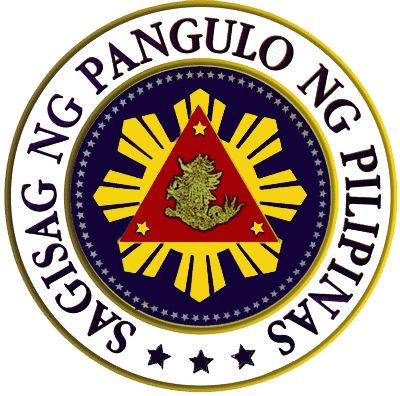
- Reference style: His Excellency
- Spoken style: Your Excellency
- Alternative style: Mr. President

Inaugural address delivered in Rizal Park, Manila, June 30, 1998

On June 30, 1998, Estrada took his oath of office at the historic Barasoain Church in Malolos, Bulacan. He also gave his inaugural address at the Quirino Grandstand where he promised to bring peace and harmony to the people and pledged to fight corruption and continue the economic reforms of the previous Ramos administration. The elected vice-president was Gloria Macapagal-Arroyo from the Lakas–NUCD.

"Erap para sa Mahirap" (lit. 'Erap for the poor') became the campaign slogan of the presidency. He drove his election campaign vehicle JEEP, which meant Justice, Economy, Environment, and Peace.

Estrada was the first president to use a special name as his official address name, combining his real family name, Ejercito, with his screen name, thus forming "Joseph Ejercito Estrada". Estrada was inaugurated on June 30, 1998, in the historical town of Malolos in Bulacan province in paying tribute to the cradle of the First Philippine Republic. That afternoon the new president delivered his inaugural address at the Quirino Grandstand in Luneta. He assumed office amid the Asian Financial Crisis and with agricultural problems due to poor weather conditions, thereby slowing the economic growth to −0.6% in 1998 from 5.2% in 1997. The economy recovered by 3.4% in 1999 and 4% in 2000. In 2000 he declared an "all-out-war" against the Moro Islamic Liberation Front (MILF) and captured its headquarters and other camps. Allegations of corruption spawned a railroaded impeachment trial in the Senate courtesy of house speaker Manuel Villar, and in 2001 Estrada was ousted by a coup after the trial was aborted.

In his inaugural address, Estrada said:

One hundred years after Kawit, fifty years after independence, twelve years after EDSA, and seven years after the rejection of foreign bases, it is now the turn of the masses to experience liberation. We stand in the shadow of those who fought to make us free – free from foreign domination, free from domestic tyranny, free from superpower dictation, free from economic backwardness.

=== Domestic policies ===
==== Rebellion in Mindanao ====
During the Ramos administration a cessation of hostilities agreement was signed between the Philippine government and the MILF in July 1997. This was continued by a series of peace talks and negotiations in Estrada administration. The MILF, an Islamic group based in formed in 1977, seeks to be an independent Islamic state from the Philippines, and, despite the agreements, a sequence of terrorist attacks on the Philippine military and civilians still continued. These included the kidnapping of a foreign priest, namely Father Luciano Benedetti; the destruction by arson of Talayan, Maguindanao's municipal hall; the takeover of the Kauswagan Municipal Hall; the bombing of the M/V Our Lady of Mediatrix ferry at Ozamiz City; and the takeover of the Narciso Ramos Highway. By doing so, they inflicted severe damage on the country's image abroad, and scared much-needed investments away. For this reason, on March 21, 2000, Estrada declared an "all-out war" against the MILF.

During the war the Catholic Bishops' Conference of the Philippines (CBCP) asked Estrada to negotiate a ceasefire with the MILF, but Estrada opposed the idea arguing that a ceasefire would cause more terrorist attacks. For the next three months of the war, Camp Abubakar, headquarters of the MILF, fell along with other 13 major camps and 43 minor camps, and then all of which became under controlled by the government. The MILF leader Hashim Salamat fled to Malaysia. The MILF later declared a jihad on the government. On July 10 of the same year, the Estrada went to Mindanao and raised the Philippine flag symbolizing victory. After the war Estrada said, "... will speed up government efforts to bring genuine and lasting peace and development in Mindanao". In the middle of July Estrada ordered the military to arrest top MILF leaders.

In his state of the nation address (SONA), Estrada highlighted his vision for Mindanao:

- The first is to restore and maintain peace in Mindanao—because, without peace, there can be no development.
- The second is to develop Mindanao—because, without development, there can be no peace.
- The third is to continue seeking peace talks with the MILF within the framework of the Constitution—because a peace agreed upon in good faith is preferable to a peace enforced by force of arms.
- And the fourth is to continue with the implementation of the peace agreement between the government and the Moro National Liberation Front, or MNLF—because that is our commitment to our countrymen and the international community.

In addition to this Estrada said his administration can move with more speed in transforming Mindanao into a progressive economic center. High on the list of priorities was the plight of MILF guerrillas who were tired of fighting and had no camps left to which to report. On October 5, 2000, the first massive surrender of 669 LC-MILF mujahideen led by the renegade vice mayor of Marugong, Lanao del Sur Malupandi Cosandi Sarip and seven other battalion commanders, surrendered to Estrada at the 4th ID headquarters in Camp Edilberto Evangelista, Bgy. Patag, Cagayan de Oro City. They were followed shortly by a second batch of 855 surrenderees led by Lost command MILF Commander Sayben Ampaso on December 29, 2000.

=== Economy ===
By the end of Estrada's administration, debt supposedly reached ₱2.1 trillion in 1999. Domestic debt supposedly amounted to ₱986.7 billion while foreign debt stood at US$52.2 billion. The fiscal deficit had reportedly doubled to more than ₱100 billion from a low of ₱49 billion in 1998. Despite such setbacks, the GDP by 1999 posted a 3.2 percent growth rate, up from a low of −0.5 percent in 1998. Moreover, domestic investments started to increase from 18.8% of GDP in 1999 to 21.2% of GDP in 2000. Unemployment stood at 10.4% under Estrada, compared to 11.2% during Arroyo's presidency and 9.3% during Ramos's presidency.

=== Human rights ===
In August 1998, Estrada signed the Comprehensive Agreement on Respect for Human Rights and International Humanitarian Law (CARHRIHL), which was drafted under President Fidel Ramos. Estrada, on December 28, 2000, signed the Rome Statute establishing the International Criminal Court.

There were 26 reported cases of enforced disappearances during the Estrada presidency.

=== Corruption charges and impeachment ===
In October 2000, Ilocos Sur governor Luis "Chavit" Singson, a close friend of Estrada, alleged that he had personally given Estrada ₱400 million as the payoff from jueteng, a grassroots-based numbers game, hidden in a bank account known as "Jose Velarde", as well as ₱180 million from the government price subsidy for the tobacco farmers' marketing cooperative after Estrada ordered a full-blown investigation into Chavit Singson's alleged misuse of millions of pesos in public funds. Cockfighting magnate Atong Ang, a marketing consultant for the Philippine Amusement and Gaming Corporation (PAGCOR) and a close associate of Estrada, was also accused by Singson of acting as an intermediary in Estrada's transactions involving money from jueteng.

In the 2004 Global Transparency Report by Transparency International, Estrada, together with Ferdinand Marcos, made it into the list of the World's All-Time Most Corrupt Leaders in the World. Estrada was listed tenth and was said to have amassed between $78 million to $80 million.

==== Impeachment trial ====
Singson's allegation caused controversy across the nation, which culminated in the House of Representatives' filing of an impeachment case against Estrada on November 13, 2000. House Speaker Manny Villar fast-tracked the impeachment complaint. The motion to impeach Estrada was endorsed by 115 Congress representatives, which is more than one-third minimum required votes to impeach Estrada. The impeachment suit was brought to the Senate and an impeachment court was formed, with Chief Justice Hilario Davide Jr. as presiding officer. Estrada pleaded "not guilty".

This was the first time the Filipino public witnessed, through radio and television, an elected president stand in trial and face possible impeachment with full media coverage. During the trial, the prosecution presented witnesses and alleged pieces of evidence to the impeachment court regarding Estrada's alleged involvement in jueteng. The existence of secret bank accounts which he allegedly used for receiving payoffs was also brought to the fore.

On the evening of January 16, 2001, the impeachment court voted not to open an envelope that allegedly contained incriminating evidence against Estrada as it was not part of the impeachment complaint. The final vote was 11–10 to keep the envelope closed. The prosecution panel (of congressmen and lawyers) walked out of the impeachment court in protest of this vote. The 11 senators who voted not to open the envelope were called the "Craven Eleven."

=== EDSA II ===
==== Protests ====
That night, anti-Estrada protesters gathered in front of the EDSA Shrine at Epifanio de los Santos Avenue, not too far away from the site of the 1986 People Power Revolution that overthrew President Ferdinand Marcos.

On January 19, 2001, Armed Forces of the Philippines Chief of Staff Angelo Reyes, seeing the political upheaval throughout the country, decided to "withdraw his support" of Estrada and pay his allegiance to the vice president, Gloria Macapagal Arroyo.

==== Ouster from office ====
The following day, the Supreme Court declared the presidency vacant even without Estrada's resignation. At noon, Vice President Gloria Macapagal Arroyo was sworn in by Chief Justice Hilario Davide Jr. as president of the Philippines. Before Estrada departed from Malacañang, he issued the following press release:

At twelve o'clock noon today, Vice President Gloria Macapagal Arroyo took her oath as President of the Republic of the Philippines. While along with many other legal minds of our country, I have strong and serious doubts about the legality and constitutionality of her proclamation as President, I do not wish to be a factor that will prevent the restoration of unity and order in our civil society.

It is for this reason that I now leave Malacañang Palace, the seat of the presidency of this country, for the sake of peace and to begin the healing process of our nation. I leave the Palace of our people with gratitude for the opportunities given to me for service to our people. I will not shirk from any future challenges that may come ahead in the same service of our country.

I call on all my supporters and followers to join me in to promotion of a constructive national spirit of reconciliation and solidarity.

May the Almighty bless our country and beloved people. Mabuhay!

The Supreme Court on March 2, 2001, upheld the constitutionality of Arroyo succeeding Estrada in a unanimous 13–0 decision in Estrada vs. Desierto.

== Post-presidency (2001–present) ==
=== Arrest and EDSA III ===
After being ousted from the presidency, Estrada returned to his family home in Greenhills, San Juan. On April 19, 2001, as per his custom, Estrada celebrated his birthday at the Taytay, Rizal resettlement site he established, and in the same day, he gave a radio interview mentioning that he was ready to give himself over to authorities upon arrest, stating that "I always submit myself to the rule of law." In addition, he discouraged his supporters from becoming violent: "I want to fight off these charges in a peaceful way."

On April 25, 2001, the Sandiganbayan charged him and his son Jinggoy with plunder and had them arrested at their home. Both of them were initially detained at Camp Crame. Estrada's supporters marched to the EDSA Shrine to stage a protest demanding Estrada's release and his reinstatement as president, among whom were his wife Loi Ejercito and political allies such as Miriam Defensor Santiago, Juan Ponce Enrile, Panfilo Lacson, and Gringo Honasan. In the early morning of May 1, supporters of Estrada marched straight to the gates of Malacañang Palace, where violence erupted and forcing President Arroyo to declare a state of rebellion. Many protesters were injured in the ensuing riots and arrested, with four casualties, while many journalists were also injured due in part to the protesters' general hostility to the media. The government called out the military and was able to quell the riots with tear gases and warning shots under a "maximum tolerance" policy. The riots came to be generally known as EDSA III, though others have argued against the use of the name.

On May 1, the same day as EDSA III, both Estrada and his son were transferred via separate helicopters to Fort Santo Domingo in Santa Rosa, Laguna under heavy security, where they shared a two-bedroom detention cell. By May 12, they were brought to the Veterans Memorial Medical Center in Quezon City, where he remained for two years before being transferred to a military facility in Tanay, Rizal on October 16, 2003, but he was later transferred to a nearby vacation home, virtually under house arrest. Under Philippine law at the time, plunder had the maximum penalty of death; the death penalty was eventually repealed by 2006.

=== Trial ===
On September 12, 2007, the Sandiganbayan gave its decision, finding Estrada not guilty in his perjury case but guilty of plunder "beyond reasonable doubt". He was sentenced to reclusión perpetua. He was thus the first Philippine president to be convicted of plunder.

On September 26, 2007, Estrada appealed by filing a 63-page motion for reconsideration of the Sandiganbayan judgment penned by Teresita de Castro (submitting five legal grounds). Estrada alleged that the court erred "when it convicted him by acquitting his alleged co-conspirators."

On October 5, 2007, the Sandiganbayan's Special Division ruled to set October 19 as an oral argument (instead of a defense reply) on Estrada's motion for reconsideration. Estrada asked for the court's permission to attend the hearing, since it ordered the prosecution to file a comment before October 11.

=== Perjury case ===
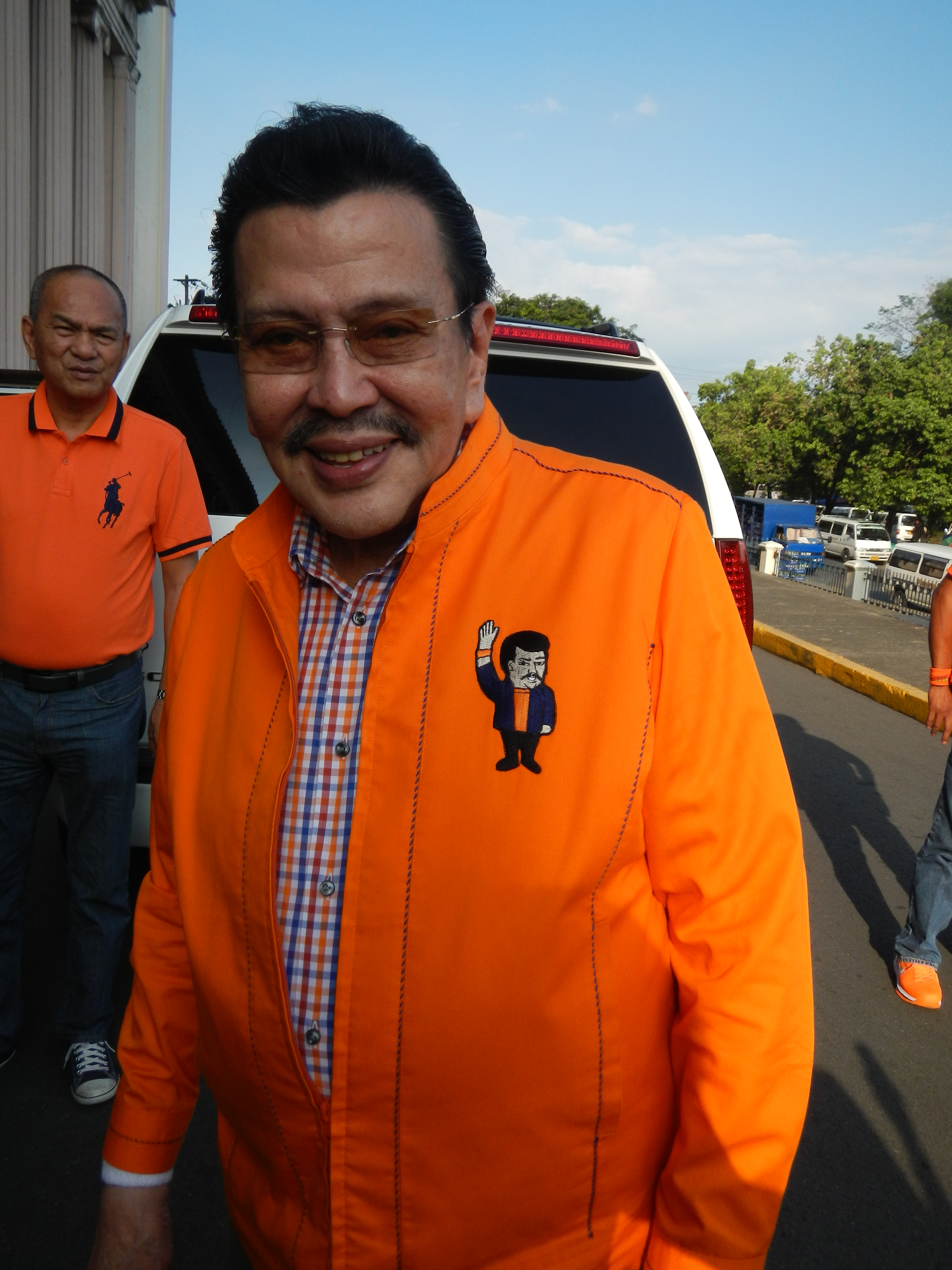
Estrada in 2012

The Sandiganbayan's special division, on June 27, 2008, ordered Estrada to file a comment within 10 days, on the motion of the Ombudsman's special prosecutor to re-open the trial of his perjury case regarding his 1999 statement of assets, liabilities, and net worth (SALN). The court was also to resolve Banco de Oro's (formerly Equitable PCI Bank) plea that it could not determine "without hazard to itself" whom to turn over to the P1.1 billion Jose Velarde assets due to claims by Wellex Group / William Gatchalian and a Bureau of Internal Revenue stay order.

=== Clemency and release from detention ===
On October 22, 2007, Acting Justice Secretary Agnes Devanadera stated that Estrada was seeking a "full, free, and unconditional pardon" from President Arroyo. Estrada's lawyer Jose Flaminiano wrote Arroyo: "The time has come to end President Estrada's fight for justice and vindication before the courts. Today [Monday], we filed a withdrawal of his Motion for Reconsideration." Estrada stressed the "delicate condition" of his mother in asking for pardon.

On October 25, 2007, President Arroyo granted executive clemency to Estrada based on the recommendation by the Department of Justice (DoJ). Acting Executive Secretary and Press Secretary Ignacio R. Bunye quoted the signed Order: "In view hereof in pursuant of the authority conferred upon me by the Constitution, I hereby grant Executive clemency to Joseph Ejercito Estrada, convicted by the Sandiganbayan of plunder and imposed a penalty of reclusión perpetua. He is hereby restored to his civil and political rights." Bunye noted that Estrada committed in his application not to seek public office, and he would be free from his Tanay resthouse on October 26, at noon. On October 26, 2007, after almost seven years of detention, Estrada was released after the Sandiganbayan promulgated the resolution.

=== Activities ===
When Estrada was released from detention, he gave a message to the Filipino people that he could once again help the lives of the people, especially the poor. He also stated that he made errors as a public servant but assured them that, notwithstanding his conviction for it, corruption was not one of them. After the message was released, he had a nationwide tour called "Lakbay Pasasalamat" (Thank you tour) during which he thanked the people for their support and gave them relief goods such as food, medicines and clothing.

=== 2010 presidential election ===
During the 2010 presidential election, Estrada stated in interviews that he would be willing to run for the opposition if they would be unable to unite behind a single candidate. Fr. Joaquin Bernas and Christian Monsod, members of the constitutional commission that drafted the 1987 Constitution, stated that the constitution prohibited any elected president from seeking a second term at any point in time. Romulo Macalintal, election counsel of President Arroyo, said that the constitutional ban did not prevent Estrada from attaining the presidency if he were to be elevated from the vice-presidency, for example. Rufus Rodriquez, one of Estrada's lawyers, claimed that Estrada was within his rights to do so because the prohibition banning re-election only applied to the incumbent president.

On October 22, 2009, Estrada announced that he would run again for president with Makati Mayor Jejomar Binay as his running mate. His senatorial lineup included Francisco Tatad, Juan Ponce Enrile, Jinggoy Estrada, Joey de Venecia, and Miriam Defensor Santiago. Estrada lost to Senator Benigno Aquino III in the election.

=== Other activities ===
In 1972, Estrada starred in Blood Compact.

In October 2010, the magazine Foreign Policy included Estrada in its list of five former heads of states/governments who did not make "a positive difference in the world", but "faded away into obscurity." Also included in this "Bad Exes" list were Thailand's Thaksin Shinawatra, Spain's Jose Maria Aznar, and Germany's Gerhard Schroder.

Estrada announced in November 2010 that he would be selling his 3,000-square-meter (32,000 sq ft) home in San Juan for about ₱200 million to pursue his real estate business. Agence France Presse reported that Estrada "has put up two high-rise residential condominium buildings and plans to build a third soon."

=== Mayor of Manila (2013–2019) ===
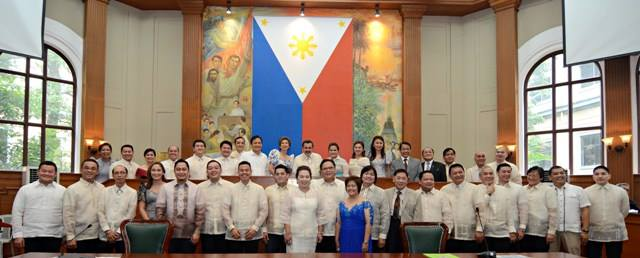
Estrada (center, back row) with members of the 10th City Council of Manila on July 13, 2016

In May 2012, Estrada announced his intention to run for Mayor of Manila in the 2013 elections to continue his political career.

Around noon of May 14, 2013, the day after the conduct of the 2013 Philippine mid-term elections, Estrada and his running-mate and re-electionist Vice Mayor Francisco "Isko" Moreno Domagoso were proclaimed mayor-elect and vice mayor-elect, respectively, by the City Board of Canvassers for the City of Manila. When Estrada assumed office on June 30, 2013, the city government coffers were practically bankrupt as his administration inherited as much as ₱5 or 8 billion in debts. During his first term as mayor of Manila, Estrada implemented a city-wide bus ban, truck ban, and revival program especially on Escolta Street. In 2015, Estrada declared the city debt-free after instituting various fiscal reforms.

Originally planning to serve for one term only, he changed his mind and ran for reelection in 2016. This time, his running mate was former 4th district councilor and OIC - City Social Welfare Officer Dr. Honey Lacuna. Estrada won in a tight race over former Mayor Alfredo Lim by around 2,000 votes, while Lacuna was elected vice mayor as well.

In October 2017, Mayor Estrada joined Davao City Mayor Sara Duterte at the launch of her Tapang at Malasakit (lit. 'Courage and Compassion') Alliance for the Philippines (TMAP) in Taguig. On December 3, 2018, Estrada's Pwersa ng Masang Pilipino partnered with Mayor Duterte's new regional party, the Hugpong ng Pagbabago (HNP), in preparation for the 2019 elections. By February 2019, Estrada would also host a Manila rally for Mayor Duterte and the HNP to endorse 13 senatorial candidates allied with the Rodrigo Duterte administration, in spite of the administration's endorsement of Estrada's mayoral rival Lim in the 2019 local election. Estrada best described his accomplishments as Mayor of Manila as providing the basic needs of Manileños "from womb to tomb." He boasted of comprehensive public services from free hospital and medical care services to all residents of Manila starting from mothers giving birth, free books, uniforms, and health snacks for public school students, all the way to free burial and cremation.

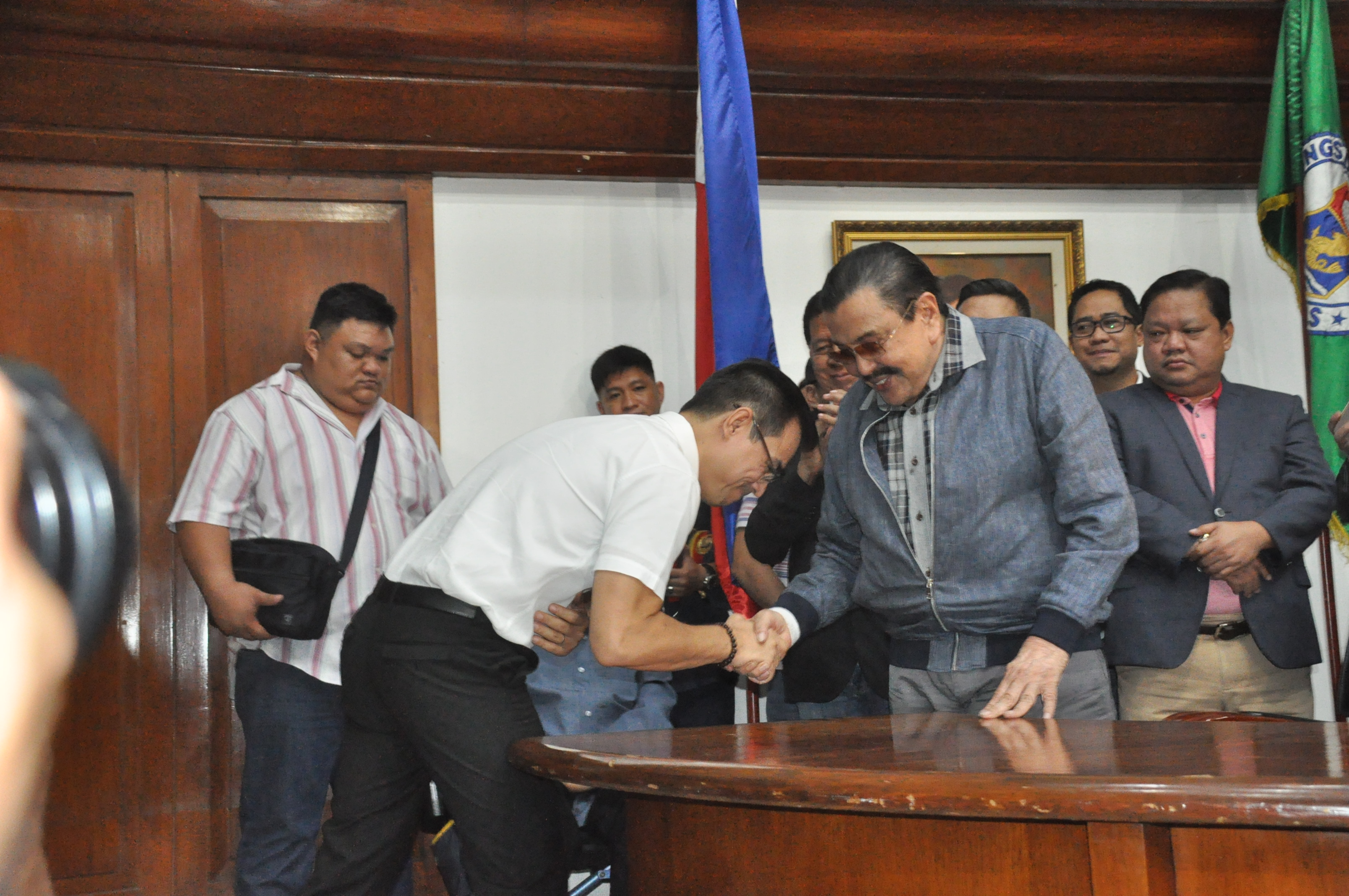
Then-mayor-elect Isko Moreno (second from left) paying a courtesy visit to then outgoing mayor Joseph Estrada (second from right) weeks after defeating the latter in the 2019 local elections

Estrada has also shown support for the controversial Manila Bay reclamation, with the fourth reclamation project approved on June 7, 2017. Estrada, however, was widely criticized for a publicity stunt at a clean-up drive in Manila Bay on July 21, 2017. On September 28, 2018, Estrada settled the city's ₱200 million tax liabilities, left unpaid by former mayors Lito Atienza and Alfredo Lim, to the Bureau of Internal Revenue.

After serving two consecutive terms as mayor, Estrada intended to run for a third term in 2019, competing against former Manila vice mayor Isko Moreno Domagoso and former Manila mayor Alfredo Lim; Estrada chose former 5th District Representative Amado Bagatsing as his running mate for vice mayor. Estrada lost to Domagoso, who beat him by more than 100,000 votes in a landslide victory. Estrada conceded defeat on the evening of May 13 and stepped down on June 30.

== Electoral history ==
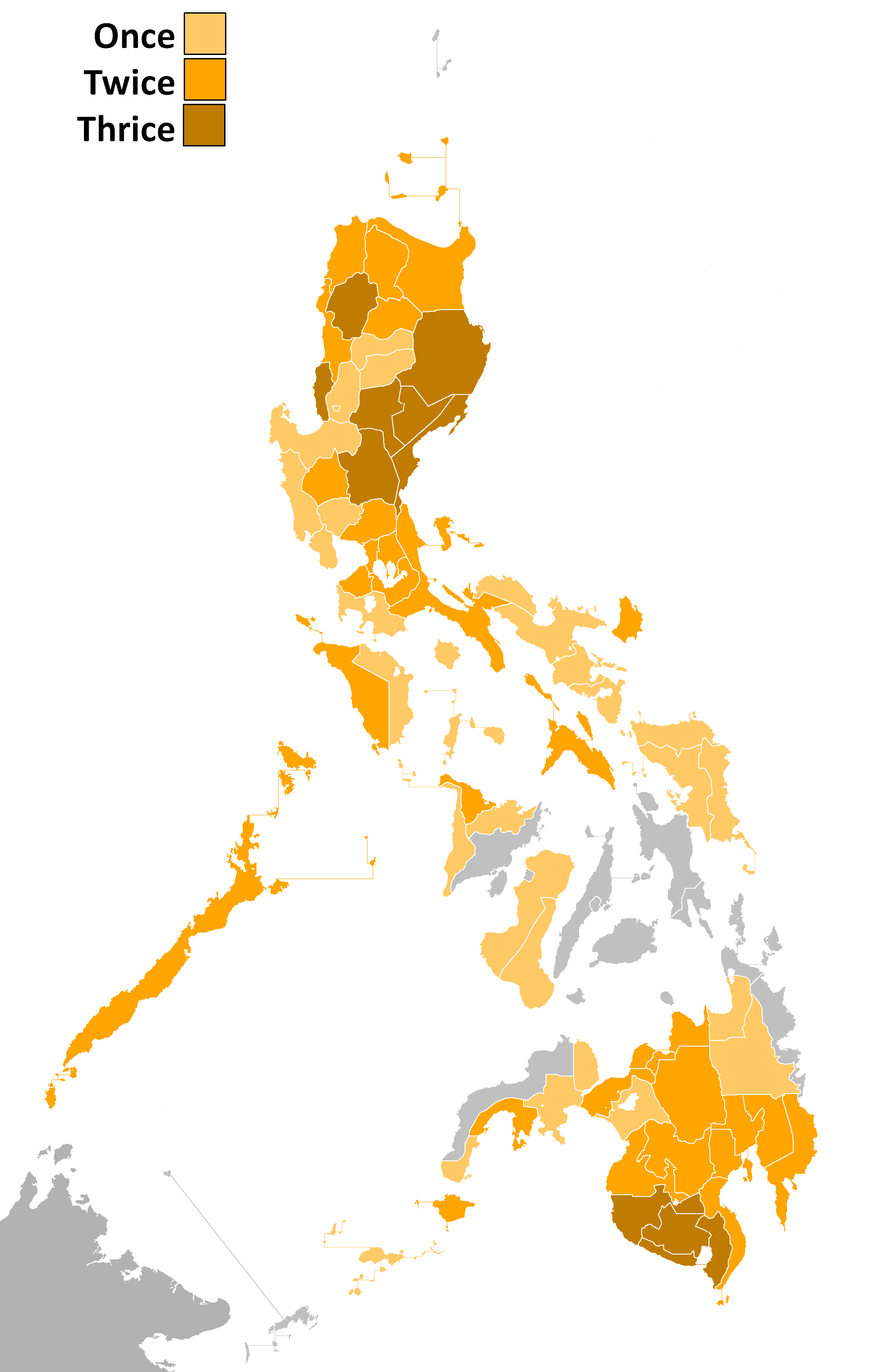
Provinces in which Estrada won in 1992, 1998 and 2010 national elections

San Juan mayoral elections

- Estrada won every mayoral election in San Juan from 1969 to 1984.

Senatorial election, 1987

- Joseph Estrada (GAD) – 10,029,978 (14th, 24 candidates with the highest number of votes win the 24 seats in the Senate)

Vice presidential election, 1992

- Joseph Estrada (PMP) – 6,739,738 (33.00%)
- Marcelo Fernan (LDP) – 4,438,494 (21.74%)
- Emilio Osmeña (Lakas) – 3,362,467 (16.47%)
- Ramon Magsaysay, Jr. (PRP) – 2,900,556 (14.20%)
- Aquilino Pimentel, Jr. (PDP–Laban) – 2,023,289 (9.91%)
- Vicente Magsaysay (KBL) – 699,895 (3.43%)
- Eva Estrada-Kalaw (Nacionalista) – 255,730 (1.25%)

Presidential election, 1998

- Joseph Estrada (LAMMP) – 10,722,295 (39.86%)
- Jose de Venecia (Lakas) – 4,268,483 (15.87%)
- Raul Roco (Aksyon) – 3,720,212 (13.83%)
- Emilio Osmeña (PROMDI) – 3,347,631 (12.44%)
- Alfredo Lim (Liberal) – 2,344,362 (8.71%)
- Renato de Villa (Reporma–LM) – 1,308,352 (4.86%)
- Miriam Defensor Santiago (PRP) – 797,206 (2.96%)
- Juan Ponce Enrile (Independent) – 343,139 (1.28%)
- Santiago Dumlao (Kilusan para sa Pambansang Pagpapanibago) – 32,212 (0.12%)
- Manuel Morato (Partido Bansang Marangal) – 18,644 (0.07%)

Presidential election, 2010

- Benigno Aquino III (Liberal) – 15,208,678 (42.08%)
- Joseph Estrada (PMP) – 9,487,837 (26.25%)
- Manny Villar (Nacionalista) – 5,573,835 (15.42%)
- Gilbert Teodoro (Lakas–Kampi) – 4,095,839 (11.33%)
- Eddie Villanueva (Bangon Pilipinas) – 1,125,878 (3.12%)
- Richard Gordon (Bagumbayan–VNP) – 501,727 (1.39%)
- Nicanor Perlas (independent) – 54,575 (0.15%)
- Jamby Madrigal (independent) – 46,489 (0.13%)
- John Carlos de los Reyes (Ang Kapatiran) – 44,244 (0.12%)

Manila mayoralty elections 2013

- Joseph Estrada (PMP) – 349,770
- Alfredo Lim (Liberal) – 307,525

Manila mayoralty elections 2016

- Joseph Estrada (PMP) – 283,149
- Alfredo Lim (Liberal) – 280,464
- Amado Bagatsing (KABAKA) – 167,829

Manila mayoralty elections 2019

- Isko Domagoso Moreno (Asenso Manileño) – 357,925
- Joseph Estrada (PMP) – 210,605
- Alfredo Lim (PDP–Laban) – 138,923

== In popular culture ==
Since the beginning of his political career, Estrada has been the butt of many jokes, called "ERAP jokes", in the Philippines. The majority of the jokes about him center around his limited English vocabulary, while others focus on his corruption scandals. During his presidential campaign in 1998, Estrada authorized the distribution of the joke compilation book ERAPtion: How to Speak English Without Really Trial.

== Personal life ==
Estrada is the first president to have previously worked in the entertainment industry as a popular artist, and the first to sport any sort of facial hair during his presidential term, specifically his trademark acting mustaches and wristbands.

Estrada plans that his remains will be buried in the grounds of the Joseph Ejercito Estrada Museum and Archives in Tanay, Rizal. This was revealed by his son, Jinggoy Estrada, in a YouTube video in 2020. The burial place was built near a rock where the former president frequently prays in his former resthouse, which became the location of his house arrest after his presidency.

=== Marriage and family ===
Estrada is married to former First Lady-turned-senator Dr. Luisa "Loi" Pimentel, whom he met while she was working at the National Center for Mental Health (NCMH) in Mandaluyong, and has three children with her:

- Jinggoy Estrada, mayor of San Juan (1992–2001); senator (2004–2016; 2022–present) (married to Precy Vitug)
- Jackie Ejercito (formerly married to Beaver Lopez)
- Jude Estrada (married to Maria Rowena Ocampo)

Due to Estrada's extramarital affair with actress Guia Gomez, Loi separated from Estrada and moved to the United States with their children for 18 years, with Estrada later stating that he "acted like a single man" during their separation. Estrada and Loi were seen reunited again when he ran for senator in 1987.

=== Extramarital affairs ===
Estrada has eight children from several extramarital relationships.

Estrada had a child with former actress Guia Gomez named Joseph Victor "JV" Ejercito, who would later become mayor of San Juan. He had two children with former actress Peachy Osorio, named Joel/Jojo and Teresita/Tetchie. He fathered a son named Jason with a former air hostess known only as Larena.

Estrada also had three children with former actress Laarni Enriquez: Jerika, Jacob, and actor Jake Ejercito, as well as one child with Joy Melendrez: Jose Mari.

=== Other relatives ===
Several of Ejercito's relatives became prominent figures in politics and show business.

- Jorge Ejercito ("George Estregan"), brother; actor
- E.R. Ejercito ("George Estregan Jr."), son of George Estregan and nephew; actor, mayor of Pagsanjan, Laguna (2001–2010) and Governor of Laguna (2010–2014)
- Gary Ejercito ("Gary Estrada"), nephew; actor, and board member of Quezon province
- Gherome Ejercito, nephew; basketball player

== Approval ratings ==
SWS Net satisfaction ratings of Joseph Estrada (September 1998 – December 2000)
Date	Rating
Sep 1998	+60
Nov 1998	+61
Mar 1999	+67
Jun 1999	+65
Oct 1999	+28
Dec 1999	+5
Mar 2000	+5
Jul 2000	+13
Sep 2000	+19
Dec 2000	+9
Average	+33

== Awards and honors ==
=== National honors ===
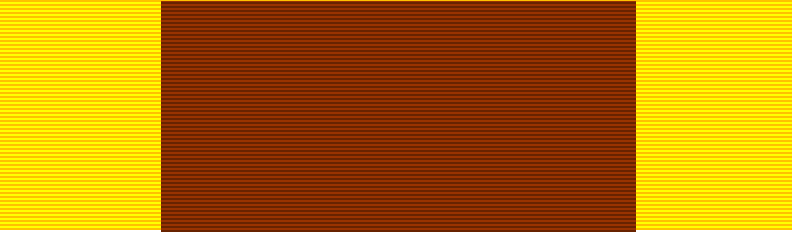
- : Order of the Knights of Rizal – Knight Grand Cross of Rizal
- 1963 FAMAS Award for Best Actor: Markang Rehas
- 1964 FAMAS nominee for Best Actor: Ito ang Maynila
- 1965 FAMAS Award for Best Actor: Geron Busabos: Ang Batang Quiapo
- 1966 FAMAS nominee for Best Actor: Sapang Palay
- 1967 FAMAS Award for Best Actor: Ito ang Pilipino
- 1969 FAMAS nominee for Best Actor: Galo Gimbal
- 1970 FAMAS Award for Best Actor: Dugo ng Bayani
- 1971 Outstanding Mayor and foremost Nationalist by the Inter-Provincial Information Service
- 1972 FAMAS nominee for Best Actor: Hukom Bitay
- 1972 FAMAS Gregorio Valdez Memorial Award
- 1972 One of the Ten Outstanding Young Men (TOYM) in Public Administration by the Philippine Jaycees
- 1973 FAMAS nominee for Best Actor: Kill the Pushers
- 1974 FAMAS nominee for Best Actor: Erap Is My Guy
- 1975 FAMAS nominee for Best Actor: The Manila Connection
- 1975 Metro Manila Film Festival Award for Best Actor for Diligin Mo ng Hamog ang Uhaw Na Lupa
- 1976 FAMAS Special Award
- 1978 FAMAS nominee for Best Actor: Bakya Mo, Neneng
- 1981 FAMAS nominee for Best Actor: Hoy Tukso, Layuan Mo Ako!
- 1982 FAMAS Award for Best Actor: Kumander Alibasbas
- 1983 FAMAS Hall of Fame Award
- 1992 Metro Manila Film Festival Gawad ng Natatanging Pagkilala
- 2007 Outstanding Citizen of San Juan
- 2009 Luna Golden Reel Award
- 2014 GMMSF Box-Office Entertainment Awards Government Service Award
- 2014 Metro Manila Film Festival Commemorative Award for Vision and Leadership

=== Foreign honors ===
- Argentina:
  - Collar of the Order of the Liberator General San Martín (20 September 1999)

=== Honorary doctorates ===
- Doctor of Humanities, Honoris Causa by the University of Pangasinan (1990)
- Doctor of Humanities, Honoris Causa by Bicol University (April 1997)

== Notes ==
Political offices
Preceded by Braulio Santo Domingo	Mayor of San Juan, Metro Manila; 1969–1986	Succeeded by Reynaldo San Pascual
Preceded by Salvador Laurel	Vice President of the Philippines; 1992–1998	Succeeded by Gloria Macapagal Arroyo
Preceded by Fidel V. Ramos	President of the Philippines; 1998–2001	Succeeded by Gloria Macapagal Arroyo
Preceded by Sonny Collantes (OIC)	Secretary of the Interior and Local Government; 1998–1999	Succeeded by Ronaldo Puno
Preceded by Alfredo Lim	Mayor of the City of Manila; 2013–2019	Succeeded by Isko Moreno
Party political offices
First	NPC nominee for Vice President of the Philippines; 1992	Vacant Title next held by Loren Legarda
First	PMP nominee for President of the Philippines; 1998, 2010	Most recent
New political party	Chairman of UNA; 2012–2015	Succeeded by Jejomar Binay
Order of precedence
Preceded by Sara Duterte as Vice President	Order of Precedence of the Philippines (Ceremonial) as Former President	Succeeded by Gloria Macapagal Arroyo as Former President
