= Akin Pa Rin ang Bukas =

2013 Philippine television drama series

- Title card
- Also known as: Perfect Vengeance
- Genre: Drama
- Created by: Denoy Navarro-Punio
- Written by: Des Garbes-Severino; Marlon Miguel; Leilani Chavez
- Directed by: Laurice Guillen
- Creative director: Jun Lana
- Starring: Lovi Poe
- Theme music composer: Pearisha Abubakar; Cecille Azarcon Inocentes
- Opening theme: "Huwag Kang Mangako" by Lovi Poe
- Country of origin: Philippines
- Original language: Tagalog
- No. of episodes: 79

Production
- Executive producer: Meann P. Regala
- Production locations: Tagaytay, Philippines; Antipolo, Philippines; Manila, Philippines
- Cinematography: Monino Duque
- Camera setup: Multiple-camera setup
- Running time: 30–45 minutes
- Production company: GMA Entertainment TV

Original release
- Network: GMA Network
- Release: September 9 – December 27, 2013

Akin Pa Rin ang Bukas (transl. tomorrow is still mine / international title: Perfect Vengeance) is a 2013 Philippine television drama series broadcast by GMA Network. Directed by Laurice Guillen, it stars Lovi Poe. It premiered on September 9, 2013, on the network's Telebabad line up. The series concluded on December 27, 2013, with a total of 79 episodes.

== Cast and characters ==
Cast

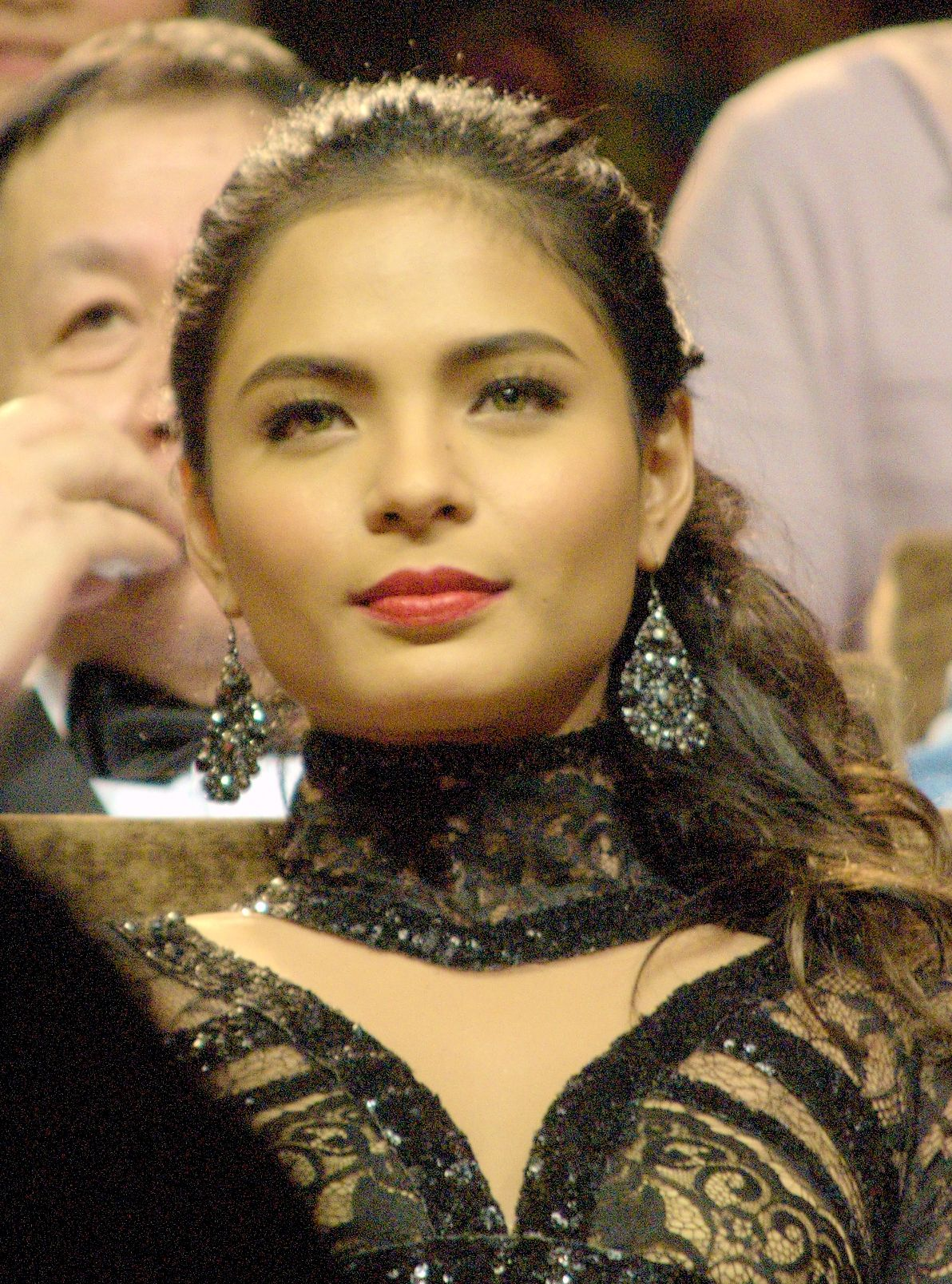
Lovi Poe

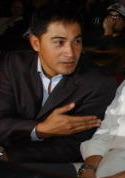
Cesar Montano

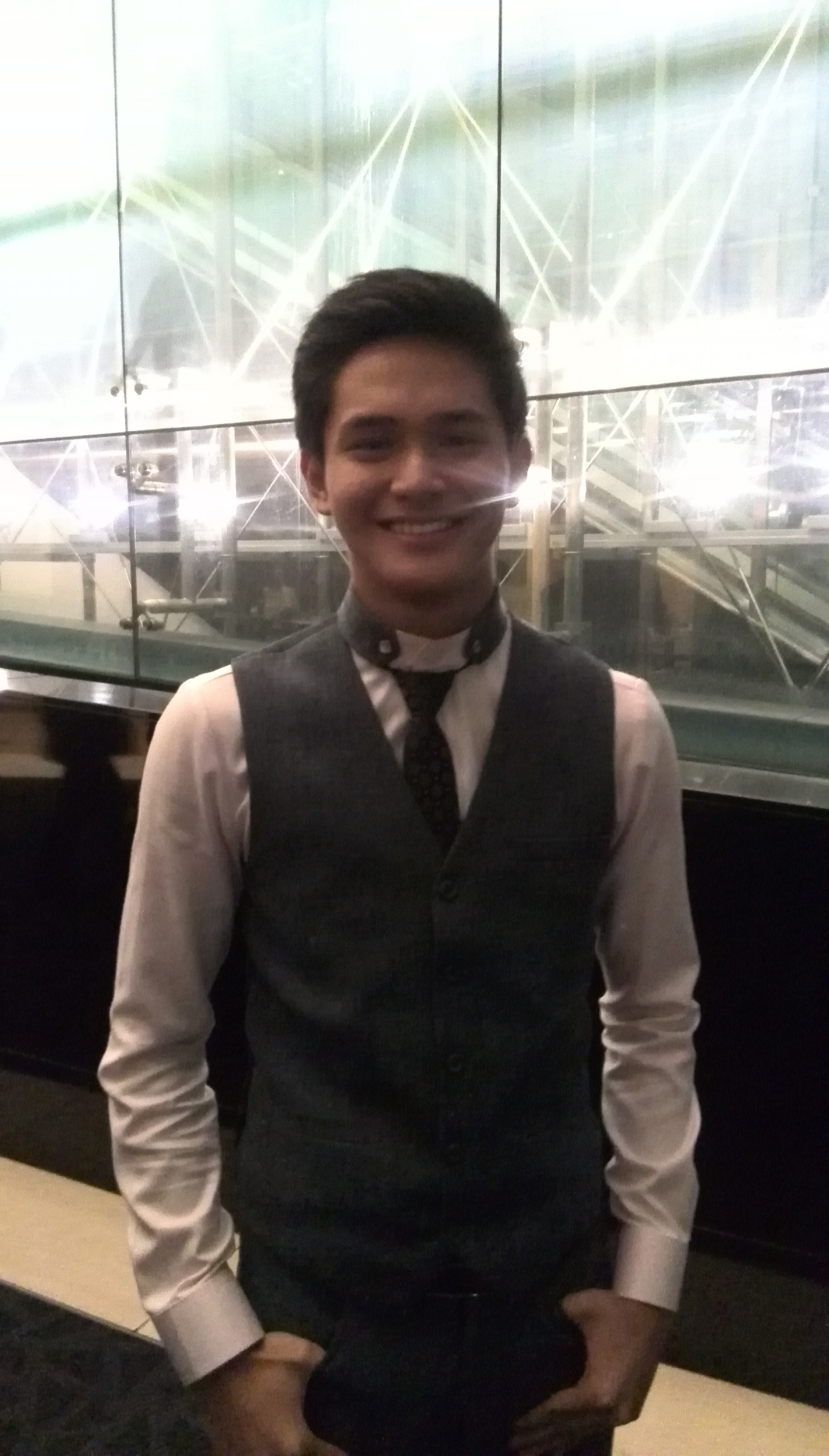
Ruru Madrid

Lead cast

- Lovi Poe as Lovelia Villacorta / Lovelia Ignacio Santos Villacorta-Sandoval

Supporting cast

- Rocco Nacino as Jerry Sandoval / Jericho/Gerard Sebastian
- Cesar Montano as Conrad Alperos
- Charee Pineda as Agatha Morales
- Gary Estrada as Roel Villacorta
- Liza Lorena as Beatrice Villacorta
- Gloria Romero as Cristina Alperos
- Solenn Heussaff as Jade Carmelo
- Ruru Madrid as Junior Morales
- Glenda Garcia as Jenny
- Rodjun Cruz as Xyrus
- Tiya Pusit as Selya

Guest cast

- Ina Feleo as Emma Ignacio
- Freddie Webb as Jaime Villacorta
- Kier Legaspi as Brando Morales
- Jaclyn Jose as Gilda
- Kyle Ocampo as Onay
- Dex Quindoza as Jun
- Leandro Baldemor as Franco Clarete
- Lollie Mara as Conchita
- Steven Silva as Tisoy
- Jan Marini as Ailyn Medrano
- Bryan Benedict

== Development ==
In late April 2013, GMA Network announced that they were developing a yet-to-be-titled Lovi Poe-starrer primetime drama project. The network's resident screenwriter, Denoy Navarro-Punio conceptualized and developed the story which tells of "a woman born out of wedlock, and who, amidst adversaries, gets back on her feet to claim the life and love she deserves."

The network's drama department hired seasoned actress and director, Laurice Guillen to helm the series. In an interview, when asked what got her to accepting an assignment she, in the past, had dodged, Guillen admitted that "the offer was good, plus more." The network [for one], accommodated certain requests pertaining to shooting schedules given her aversion to taping long hours or till the "wee" hours of the morning. As to the actors she assembled for the series, Guillen said she was glad that most, if not all, of them are competent performers and "they are the best cast possible in terms of talent and professionalism". She's also very happy with the story, with the writers and creative team, and the network support. Apart from that, Guillen also stated her more personal reasons for saying "yes", said that "I told myself, when will I do something like this? [...] I'm not getting any younger, and when I am no longer physically capable of directing one, I don't want to regret that I didn't do it, at least once."

=== Casting ===
The network began casting for Akin Pa Rin ang Bukas in May 2013. The first actor to be cast was Lovi Poe as the protagonist Lovelia Villacorta, followed by Rocco Nacino as Jerry, the love interest.

After the first sit down meeting with creative director Jun Lana, Cesar Montano immediately agreed to star on the series. Montano also stated that it was his desire to work again with director, Laurice Guillen—who was his director in the 1989 film Ang Bukas ay Akin, which he won his very first acting award—as one of the main reasons why he accepted the project.

The network also announced the inclusion of Solenn Heussaff, Gary Estrada and Charee Pineda as series regulars. The role of Jade Carmelo was originally offered to Alessandra de Rossi. De Rossi turned it down, and it was given to Heussaff. Estrada signed on to portray Roel Villacorta, while Pineda was cast as the villain, Agatha Morales.

After signing an exclusive contract with GMA Network, actress Helen Gamboa was cast as Beatrice Villacorta in the series. She later dropped out of the series for "health reasons". Gamboa had already finished twenty-two sequences in different locations, the production had to re-shoot all her scenes. Liza Lorena was originally tapped to play another character in the series, was asked to replace Gamboa. Gloria Romero, took the original role of Lorena as Cristina Alperos, stated that she was hesitant to accept the role when it was first offered to her. After a meeting with the production people regarding the concept, story line, her character and "when they told me that the director will be Laurice Guillen, I immediately grabbed the project."

== Production ==
Principal photography commenced in June 2013. Most of the series' were shot on location in Tagaytay. Other locations include Antipolo, Quaipo and San Juan. The premiere was planned for July 29, 2013. Due to production-related problems, it was delayed to September 9, 2013. The series was originally slated to run for sixteen weeks. On November 18, 2013), Poe said the series has been extended for another five weeks "after gaining a strong following since it debuted in September."

== Reception ==
=== Ratings ===
According to AGB Nielsen Philippines' Mega Manila household television ratings, the pilot episode of Akin Pa Rin ang Bukas earned a 25.2% rating. The final episode scored a 25% rating.

=== Critical response ===
Journal's Mario Bautista commented on Rocco Nacino's acting performance, saying that "[Nacino is] fascinating to watch in Akin Pa Rin ang Bukas because he understands his role well. As the scheming and double dealing Jerry, he is a young man from squatters who try to make it appear in front of Lovi Poe as Lovelia that he is rich and cultured. When he's at home with the squatters, he really acts like a regular uncouth 'sanggan'. When he's with Lovi and Cesar Montano, he speaks in English and delivers lines he quotes from the Hollywood films he watches and imitates. Isah Red of Manila Standard Today, stated that Poe "continues to amaze the audience with her nearly naturalistic performance as a woman who is struggling between death and love." Red also complimented series' director Laurice Guillen, said that "[Guillen] is meticulous in making sure that it does not develop into a nonsensical melodrama in which the plot meanders repetitiously. And I am glad its storyline goes into the direction in which we discover a lot about the characters."
