= Gising Na si Adan =

Philippine action film

- Official movie poster
- Directed by: Felix E. Dalay
- Screenplay by: Felix E. Dalay; Navette A. Silorio
- Story by: Felix E. Dalay
- Produced by: Felix E. Dalay
- Starring: Gary Estrada
- Cinematography: Rey de Leon
- Edited by: Renato de Leon
- Music by: Edwin Ortega
- Production company: Jolo Films
- Distributed by: Jolo Films
- Release date: November 20, 2002
- Running time: 105 minutes
- Country: Philippines
- Language: Filipino

Gising Na si Adan is a 2002 Philippine action film written, produced and directed by Felix E. Dalay. The film stars Gary Estrada in the title role.

== Cast ==
- Gary Estrada as Lt. Adrian Crisologo
- Aya Medel as Sandra
- Via Veloso as Rachel
- Allona Amor as Monique
- Dick Israel as PSupt. Lance Crisologo
- Jeffrey Santos as Jepoy D'Pogi
- Charlie Davao as Gov. Monerola
- Lucita Soriano as Marta
- Cris Daluz as Pedro
- Alvin Anson as Rico
- Marco Polo Garcia as Bro. Max
- Edwin Reyes as Bro. Brix
- John Vincent Baclig as Jon-jon
- Brisel Lopez as Nancy
- Ernie Forte as Para
- Boy Gomez as Igme
- Falcon Laxa as Toktong
- Resty Hernandez as Sgt. Pork
- Manny Pungay as Capt. Beana
- Jaime Cuales as Pom-pom
- Jack Barri as Bert
- Christian Banzil as Chris
- Rosalinda Rosal as Sexy Dancer
- Pepito Diaz as Gen. Silorio
- Atong Frias as Police Colonel
- Rey Fabian as Police Officer
- Lance Garrick Celis as Floor Manager
- Ronald Asinas as Sgt. Asinas
- Benjie Pamintuan as Mokong
- Marlon Angeles as Hostage Taker Leader
- Kim Santos as Sales Representative
- Noel Elmido as Red Plate Car Driver
- Nido De Jesus as Pier Security Guard
