= Jude Estrada =

Son of former Philippine president Joseph Estrada

- Born: Jude Pimentel Ejercito; September 28, 1967 (age 59); Philippines
- Education: Aquinas School (high school)
- Spouse: Maria Rowena Ocampo (m. 2008)
- Children: 3 including Justin
- Parents: Joseph Estrada; Loi Ejercito
- Relatives: Ejercito family

Jude Pimentel Ejercito (born September 28, 1967), known by his screen name Jude Estrada, is a Filipino businessman, Air Force reserve colonel and former actor.

The youngest son of former president Joseph Estrada with Loi Ejercito, Jude briefly ventured into acting in the 1990s.

After his father was arrested on April 25, 2001, for plunder, he was a participant of the pro-Estrada rallies in EDSA Shrine that lead to the May 1 riots near Malacañang Palace.

== Life and career ==
In 1989, Estrada had a daughter out of wedlock with actress Lyka Ugarte named Lyza.

In the 1990s, Jude briefly followed his father Joseph Estrada's career path by being an actor in the film industry.

For a time, Estrada was sent off in the United States, coming back to the Philippines by the time his father was president in 1998. By 1999, Estrada was a captain of the Philippine Air Force, and in the same year was credited with establishing three companies: Primeval Commodities, Paragon Security Management and Investigation Services, and Reach Management Corp. The film studio Millennium Cinema was also co-founded in 1999 by Estrada, along with his siblings Jinggoy and Jackie, his mother Loi and his uncle Jesus Ejercito.

After his father was deposed from the presidency by EDSA II in January 2001 and replaced by Gloria Macapagal Arroyo, Jude clarified that his allegiance as a reserve captain of the Philippine Air Force would now shift away from his father and to Arroyo, stating that "as a soldier, I am loyal to the commander-in-chief, no matter who they are." Despite this, after the Sandiganbayan arrested both his father and brother Jinggoy Estrada on April 25 for plunder, Jude participated in the pro-Estrada demonstrations at EDSA Shrine that protested the arrest. The rallies he attended were soon followed by the May 1 riots initiated by rallyists marching from the shrine to Malacañang Palace, which he and his half-brother JV Ejercito joined but left before the march reached Mendiola Street near the palace.

On June 2, 2008, Estrada married his childhood neighbor and long-time girlfriend Maria Rowena "Weng" Ocampo in Forbes Park, Makati. They have two children.

In September 2017, Estrada accompanied his brother Jinggoy upon the latter's release from prison. In April 2025, Estrada joined his father Joseph in attending the wake of actress Nora Aunor at Heritage Park in Taguig. In September 2025, Estrada was promoted to reserve brigadier general, being named Wing Commander of the 5th Air Force Wing Reserve.

Estrada owns a house in Glendale, California.

== Filmography ==
Year	Title	Role	Note(s)	Ref(s).
1994	Tatlong Anak, Isang Ama			
1995	Hatulan: Bilibid Boys 2			
1995	Salamat sa Lotto, Linggo-Linggo Doble-Pasko			
1996	Anak, Pagsubok Lamang			
1996	Tirad Pass: The Last Stand of Gen. Gregorio del Pilar			
1996	Kahit sa Bala Kakapit Ako			
1997	Angel de Jesus, Masikip ang Mundo para sa Iyo			
1997	Buenavista: Kapag Dumanak ang Dugo			
1997	Bandido	Rick		
1998	Ang Joker at ang Pistolero	Rommel		
2000	Palaban	Robert Liwag		
