= Mia Gracia =

Philippine television drama series

- Genre: Drama
- Written by: Gina Marissa Tagasa; Abner Prado Tulagan
- Directed by: Herman Escueta
- Starring: Jessica "Gracia" Cortez
- Theme music composer: Joey de Leon
- Opening theme: "Mia Gracia" by The Fire
- Country of origin: Philippines
- Original language: Tagalog
- No. of episodes: 263

Production
- Executive producers: Antonio P. Tuviera; Malou Choa-Fagar
- Camera setup: Multiple-camera setup
- Running time: 30 minutes
- Production company: TAPE Inc.

Original release
- Network: GMA Network
- Release: August 12, 1996 – August 15, 1997

Mia Gracia is a Philippine television drama series broadcast by GMA Network. Directed by Herman Escueta, it stars Jessica "Gracia" Cortez. It premiered on August 12, 1996. The series concluded on August 15, 1997, with a total of 263 episodes.

== Cast and characters ==
Lead cast

- Jessica "Gracia" Cortez as Gracia Paraiso / Mia Perdon

Supporting cast

- Alvin Anson as Troy
- Raffy Rodriguez as Paeng
- Joanne Pascual as Joan
- Mikee Villanueva as Leah
- Iwi Nicolas as Mica
- Brando Legaspi as Alex
- Zenie Zabala
- Gary Estrada
- Anita Linda
- Glenda Garcia
