= Tiya Pusit =

Filipino movie and television actress and comedian (1948–2014)

- Born: Myrna Villanueva; 23 March 1948; Quezon City, Philippines
- Died: 2 October 2014 (aged 66); Philippine Heart Center; Quezon City
- Other name: Tiya Pusit
- Occupations: Actress and comedian
- Years active: 1975–2014
- Relatives: Nova Villa (sister)

Tiya Pusit (born Myrna Villanueva; March 23, 1948 – October 2, 2014) was a Filipino actress and comedian. She is best known for her role in the 1980s sitcom Eh, Kasi Babae. She is acclaimed as one of the best local comediennes of her generation.

== Personal life ==
Tiya Pusit was the sister of actress and comedian Nova Villa. In 2013, it was announced that she would be marrying her 27-year-old boyfriend in 2014. She had four children.

== Career ==
Villanueva's career in entertainment began when she was discovered while accompanying Nova Villa to her workplace as a broadcaster on Radio Veritas by program host Orly Punzalan. She began working for the station as a production assistant before becoming a broadcaster herself. Villanueva's association with her sister also led to her acquiring the stage name Tiya Pusit (lit. 'Aunt Squid'); a reference to her shadowing Villa that was likened to squid ink.

Tiya Pusit was best known for comedic roles during her 30+ year career. She appeared in many movies, including Dorm Boys (2012), A Journey Home (2009), Bakit ba Ganyan (Ewan ko nga ba, Darling) (2000), Huwag na Huwag kang Lalapit Darling (1997) and Hulihin si…Nardong Toothpick (1990), and Leroy Leroy Sinta (1988).

Villanueva's final roles were in ABS-CBN's drama series Ikaw Lamang and the TV5 sitcom Confessions of a Torpe. She also had roles in DZBB-TV programs, GMA shows including Bahay Mo Ba 'To? (2005) One True Love (2012) and Akin Pa Rin ang Bukas (2013) and ABS-CBN dramas Momay (2010) and Mara Clara (2011).

== Death ==
Pusit fell ill in April 2014, suffering from kidney failure and aortic aneurysm. She underwent double heart bypass surgery on September 9 but had difficulties recovering. She died due to multiple organ failure at the Philippine Heart Center in Quezon City on October 2, 2014.

== Filmography ==
=== Film ===
Year	Title	Role
1986	No Return No Exchange	Mr. Dimaguiba's Maid
1987	My Bugoy Goes to Congress	
1987	Di Bale Na Lang	
1988	Fly Me to the Moon	Teacher
1988	Leroy Leroy Sinta	
1988	Good Morning, Titser	
1989	Yes Yes Yo, Kabayong Kutsero	
1989	M&M, the Incredible Twins	
1990	Small en Terrible	
1990	Hulihin si Nardong Toothpick	
1990	Lover's Delight	
1991	Barbi for President	Sheryl Ignacio
1992	Ano Ba Yan!	Pregnant Woman
1993	Mama's Boys	
1993	Gin Kata	
1993	Ang Kuya Kong Siga	
1993	Mga 'Syanong Parak	
1993	Dino, Abangan ang Susunod Na...	
1993	Bulag, Pipi at Bingi	
1994	Tunay Na Magkaibigan, Walang Iwanan...Peksman	
1994	Once Upon a Time in Manila	Panchang
1995	Ikaw Lang Ang Mamahalin: Camiguin	
1995	Pustahan Tayo, Mahal Mo Ako	
1995	Hataw Na	Nena Masbate
1996	Daddy's Angel	Sr. Miriam
1996	Kung Alam Mo Lang	
1996	Kailanman	
1996	Sa Iyo Ang Langit, Akin Ang Lupa	
1997	Wanted Perfect Murder	Tindera
1997	Huwag na Huwag Kang Lalapit, Darling	
1997	Buhay Mo'y Buhay Ko Rin	
1997	Ako Ba Ang Nasa Puso Mo?	Elma
1997	Langit Sa Piling Mo	
1998	April, May, June	
1998	Kasal-Kasalan Sakalan	Akang
1999	D'Sisters: Nuns of the Above	
2000	Ayos Na Ang Kasunod	Aling Toyang
2000	Bakit Ba Ganyan? (Ewan Ko Nga Ba, Darling)	
2001	Super Idol	
2001	Kapitan Ambo: Outside de Kulambo	Pusit
2003	Message Sent	
2003	Anghel sa Lupa	Manang Vita
2003	Pakners	Simang
2003	Masamang Ugat	Lara's Tita
2003	Pinay Pie	Tarcing
2009	1017: Sa Paglaya ng Aking Salita	
2009	A Journey Home	Tita Nenita
2010	Tarima	Diday
2012	Pacer 3	
2012	Dorm Boys	

=== Television ===
Year	Title	Role
1982	Eh Kasi, Babae	
1999–2003	Beh Bote Nga	Tweety
2004–2007	Bahay Mo Ba 'To?	Bella
2007–2008	Zaido: Pulis Pangkalawakan	Angge Mentor
2009–2010	Tinik sa Dibdib	Manda
2010	Momay	Aling Linda
2011	Mara Clara	Yaya Bonnel
2012	One True Love	Brittany
2013	Akin Pa Rin ang Bukas	Selya
2014	Confessions of a Torpe	Aling Rosing
2014	Ikaw Lamang	Soledad
