= Huwarang Bituin ng FAMAS Award =

Filipino film awards

The Huwarang Bituin ng FAMAS is an award given to a motion picture actor who has shown great charisma, incredible acting prowess, exemplary social skills - off and on camera - and loyal fan following over their long-spanning career filled with memorable and award-winning performances in Philippine cinema's greatest screen classics and/or profitable releases.

== Recipients ==
Only three actors have been given this award:

- 2003 (52nd) Susan Roces
- 2004 (53rd) Dolphy
- 2007 (57th) Gloria Romero
