= Mary Ejercito =

Mother of Joseph Ejercito Estrada

Doña Mary Ejercito
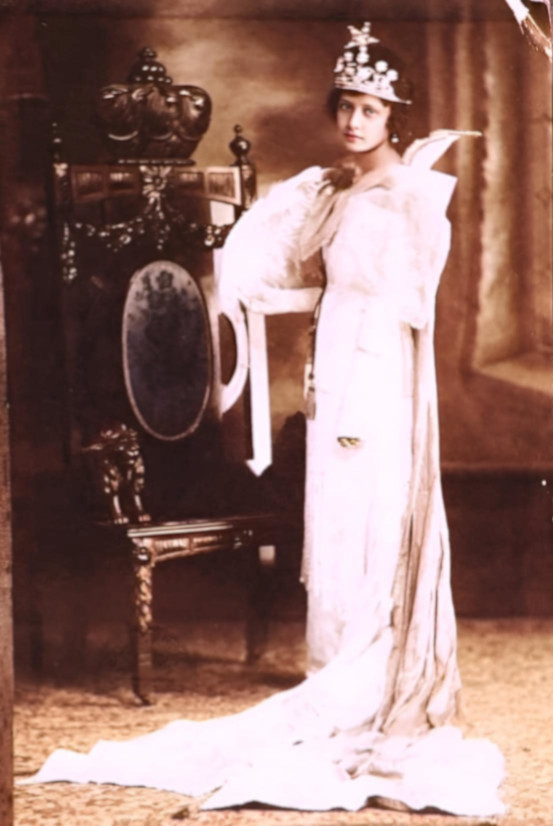
- Young Maria Marcelo as a beauty queen in the early 1920's
- Born: Maria Fernandez Marcelo; May 2, 1905; Malate, Manila, Philippine Islands
- Died: January 13, 2009 (aged 103); San Juan, Metro Manila, Philippines
- Other names: Mary Ejercito; Doña Mary
- Occupation: Housewife
- Spouse: Emilio A. Ejercito Sr. (m. 1926; died 1977)
- Children: 10 (inc. Joseph and George)

Maria "Mary" Fernandez Marcelo-Ejercito (May 2, 1905 – January 13, 2009), also known as Doña Mary, was the mother of Joseph Ejercito Estrada, the thirteenth president of the Philippines. Her ailing health was cited as among the reasons for the withdrawal of the appeal of the former president from his conviction for criminal plunder charges in 2007; Estrada was immediately pardoned by his successor, President Gloria Macapagal Arroyo.

== Education ==
Maria Marcelo finished her secondary schooling at the Colegio de Sta. Rosa, and enrolled at the University of the Philippines Faculty of Music, where she received a diploma in piano.

== Marriage and children ==
She met Engr. Emilio A. Ejercito Sr. (1899–1977), an engineer who became the first Sanitary Engineer of the City of Manila. They were married on June 13, 1926, in Singalong, Manila. Together they had ten children: Pilarica (1927-2026), Emilio, Jr. (1929-1999), Paulino (Paulie) (1931-2009), Patrocinio (1933-2021), Antonio (1933-2004), Connie (born 1935), Marita (born 1935), the (former) President and mayor Joseph Estrada (born 1937), the actor George Estregan (Jorge) (1939-1988) and Jesus (Jesse) (born 1941). In 1998, Ejercito received the "Ulirang Ina" ('Exemplary Mother') award from the Philippines’ Elderly Persons Foundation. In that same year, she attended the presidential inauguration of her son Joseph on June 30 at Barasoain Church in Malolos, Bulacan.

== Presidential mother ==
During her son's rule, Ejercito kept a low profile. She reportedly advised her son to be cautious of the influence wielded by his close friends. During President Estrada's impeachment trial, news of the political crisis was deliberately withheld from her, but after receiving information of the proceedings she advised her son thusly: "It's more than high time you change. The people are angry now."

=== Health problems ===
Ejercito's health began to decline during her son's six-year incarceration; the ousted President would occasionally be granted furloughs to visit his ailing mother. In 2007, Ejercito was confined at the San Juan Medical Center, and rumours spread that she was near death. On September 12, 2007, Estrada was convicted by the Sandiganbayan (a special appellate collegial court) of plunder charges and sentenced to reclusión perpetua. One month later, he withdrew his appeal and instead sought for a presidential pardon. Among the reasons cited for the request, which was granted, was Ejercito's "delicate condition".

On May 2, 2008, Ejercito celebrated her 103rd birthday from her sickbed. She had been confined to hospital and attached to an artificial respirator since August 2007 and would remain so until death.

On December 12, 2008, a spokesperson for former President Estrada reported that Ejercito was in critical condition and needed resuscitation, but her physicians announced later that day that her condition had since stabilised.

== Death ==
Ejercito died on January 13, 2009, at San Juan Medical Center in San Juan, Metro Manila, from a heart seizure and stomach aneurysm. Former President Joseph Estrada and his six surviving siblings, namely Pilarica, Paulino (who died eight months later in September of the same year), Patrocinio, Connie, Marita, and Jesus, were at her side when she died, as were also several of her grandchildren, great and great-great-grandchildren as well.
