= George Estregan =

Filipino film actor (1939–1988)

- Born: Jorgé Jesús Ejército y Marcelo; July 10, 1939; Tondo, Manila, Philippine Commonwealth
- Died: August 2, 1988 (aged 49); Santa Mesa, Manila, Philippines
- Occupation: Actor
- Years active: 1963–1988
- Spouse: Ramona Pelayo (m. 1962)
- Children: 7 (including E.R. ("George Jr."), Gary and Gherome)
- Mother: Mary Ejercito
- Family: Joseph Estrada (brother)
- Awards: FAMAS Best Actor; 1972 Sukdulan; FAMAS Supporting Actor; 1978 Kid Kaliwete; 1980 Lumakad Kang Hubad sa Mundong Ibabaw

Jorgé Jesús Marcelo Ejército (Tagalog pronunciation: [ʔɛˌhɛːɾ.sɪˈto]; July 10, 1939 – August 8, 1988), better known as George Estregan or George Estregan Sr., was a Filipino mestizo film actor.

Estregan made his film debut in 1963 with Jose Nazareno, ang Taxi Driver. He was often cast as a villain and was known as the "Penetration King" of erotic Philippine cinema.

Estregan won critical acclaim for many of his performances. In 1972, he was named FAMAS Best Actor for Sukdulan, and would win two other FAMAS Awards for Best Supporting actor for Kid Kaliwete (1978) and Lumakad Kang Hubad sa Mundong Ibabaw (1980). He was nominated for the FAMAS Award three other times, as Best Actor for Lumapit, Lumayo ang Umaga (1975) and Lalake Ako (1982), and for Best Supporting Actor in Magkayakap sa Magdamag (1986). He also received a nomination from the Gawad Urian as Best Actor for Hostage: Hanapin si Batuigas (1977).

== Early life ==
Jorgé Jesús Marcelo Ejercito was born on July 10, 1939, at Manuguit Maternity Hospital (now known as Amisola Maternity Hospital) in Tondo, Manila, to Engr. Emilio A. Ejercito, Sr. and Mary (née Marcelo). His older brother is former Philippine President and former Manila Mayor, Joseph Estrada.

== Personal life ==
He was married to Ramona Pelayo-Ejercito of Ibajay, Aklan, with whom he had four children: actor Emilio Ramon Ejercito III ("George Estregan, Jr."), Maria Georgina Ejercito, Kurt Joseph Ejercito, and George Gerald Ejercito. He was also the father of actor Gary Jason Ejercito ("Gary Estrada"), Kate Gomez (mother of actor Rob Gomez), and Philippine Basketball Association player Rain or Shine Elasto Painters Gherome Eric Ejercito out of wedlock. His grandson Kiko Estrada is also an actor.

== Filmography ==
=== Film ===
Year	Title	Role
1961	Ikaw o Ako	Mayor Anselmo Regalado
1965	Sapang Palay	
1966	Ang Babaeng Ito Ay Akin!	
1968	Valiente Brothers	
1968	Tatak: Double Cross	
1968	Suntok o Karate	
1968	Dos Por Dos	
1968	Jerico	Jerico
1969	Eric	
1969	Ang Ninong Kong Nazareno	
1970	The Alvarados	
1970	Lover for Hire	
1970	Psycho Sex Killer	
1971	Udyok	
1971	Pulot Gala	
1971	Kami Ba'y Makasalan?	
1971	The Superstar	
1971	Durog	
1972	Sukdulan	
1972	Kumander Erlinda	
1972	Blood Compact	
1973	Kung Bakit Dugo ang Kulay ng Gabi	
1973	Target: The Criminals	
1973	Wonder Vi	
1974	Ang Pagbabalik ni Leon Guerrero	Gancho
1974	Ibilanggo si Cavite Boy	
1974	Bandila ng Magigiting	
1974	Xia Nan Yang	The Filipino Boxer
1974	Daigdig ng Sindak at Lagim	Angelo
1974	Magnong Harabas	
1974	Durugin ang Mga Diyablo sa Punta Fuego	
1974	Kiu RP Nine-O	
1974	Sumigaw Ka Hanggang Ibig Mo!	
1974	Ugat	
1974	Manila Connection	
1974	Kapitan Eddie Set	
1975	Ang Manika Ay Takot sa Krus	
1975	Ito'y Isang Baliw Na Baliw Na Digdig	
1975	Mister Mo, Lover Boy Ko	
1975	Ibong Lukaret	
1975	Operation Villapando	
1975	Bamboo Trap	
1975	Mababagsik na Anghel	
1975	Sa Kagubatan ng Lungsod	
1975	Hiwaga	
1975	Laging Umaga	
1975	Nagbabagang Silangan	
1975	Alat	
1975	Lumapit, Lumayo ang Umaga	
1975	Gumapang Ka sa Lupa	
1975	At Lumaganap ang Lagim	Satur
1975	Hindi Tayo Talo	
1975	Huling Patak ng Ulan	
1975	Ang Biyuda Ay Misteryosa	
1976	Unos sa Dalampasigan	
1976	Silang Matatapang	
1976	Isang Pag-Ibig, Isang Pangarap, at Isang Bulaklak	
1976	Lord, Give Me a Lover	
1976	Ang Halaga Ay Luha, Laman at Dugo	
1976	Kahit Sino Ka Man, Mahal Kita	
1976	Walang Karanasan	Geron
1976	Buhay at Pag-Ibig ni Boy Zapanta	
1976	The Outside Man	
1976	Sekretaryang Walang Silya	
1976	Dakpin si Boy Zapanta	
1976	Nunal sa Tubig	
1976	Malamig, Mainit sa Magdamag	
1976	Labo-Labo sa Project 10 ½	
1976	Durugin Ko ang Araw	
1976	Mga Biyuting Pasahero, sa Pilyong Kutsero	
1976	Escolta; Mayo 13; Biyernes ng Hapon!	
1977	The Interceptors	
1977	Hostage: Hanapin si Batuigas	
1977	Bawal: For Men Only	
1977	Babae!	
1978	Isang Araw, Isang Buhay	Ramon
1978	Anak sa Una, Kasal sa Ina	
1978	Roma-Amor	Tyrone
1978	The Jess Lapid Story	
1978	Salonga	
1978	Kid Kaliwete	
1979	Tomcat	
1979	Dakpin...Killers For Hire	
1979	Pleasure	
1979	9 De Pebrero	
1979	Paano ang Gabi Kung Wala Ka Na?	
1979	Kakampi Ko ang Sto. Niño	
1979	Huwag	
1979	Pepeng Kulisap	
1979	Ahas sa Pugad Lawin	
1979	Dakpin si Junior Bombay	
1979	Aliw	
1979	Tsikiting Master	
1979	Ang Sisiw Ay Isang Agila	
1980	Tres Kantos	
1980	Tatak Angustia	Tinyente
1980	Si Malakas, si Maganda at si Mahinhin	Prince Salvo
1980	Sa Init ng Apoy	
1980	Nang Bumuka ang Sampaguita	
1980	Lumakad Ka ng Hubad sa Mundong Ibabaw	
1980	Kanto Boy	
1980	Bomba Star	Producer
1980	Angelita... Ako ang Iyong Ina	Dr. Santos
1980	Himala	
1980	Uhaw sa Kalayaan	
1980	Langis at Tubig	Pocholo
1980	Dang-Dong	
1981	Matalim sa Pangil sa Gubat	
1981	Viva Santiago	
1981	Tropang Bulilit	
1981	Takbo, Peter, Takbo!	
1981	Quintin Bilibid	
1981	Kumander Kris	
1981	Kapwa Simaron	
1981	Kamlon	
1981	Kami'y Ifugao	
1981	Geronimo	
1981	Alfredo Sebastian	
1981	Cleopatra Wong	
1982	Suicide Force	
1982	Lalake Ako	
1982	Krus ng Bawat Punglo	
1982	Tulisan ng Pasong Musang	
1982	Kumander Elpidio Paclibar	
1983	Pieta	Pulis
1983	Pedro Tunasan	
1983	The Killer of Satan	Enchong
1983	Lumaban Ka	
1983	Kumander Melody	
1983	Inside Job	
1983	Alex San Diego: Wanted	
1984	Nardong Putik: Kilabot ng Cavite (Version II)	
1984	Hanggang Sa Huling Bala	
1984	Gintong Araw ni Boy Madrigal	
1984	Death Raiders	
1984	Kung Tawagin Siya'y Animal	
1984	Daang Hari	
1984	Sa Bulaklak ng Apoy	
1984	Batuigas II: Pasukuin si Waway	Ruther Batuigas
1985	Partida	Mayor Francisco Ledesma
1985	Mga Paruparong Buking	Senen
1985	Markang Rehas: Ikalawang Aklat	
1985	Ulo ng Gapo	
1985	Bilang Na ang Oras Mo	
1985	Anak ng Tondo	Medrano
1985	Mission Order: Hulihin si ... Avelino Bagsic ang Rebelde	
1985	Ben Tumbling	Sgt. Calinisan
1985	Revenge for Justice	Police Lieutenant
1985	Sa Dibdib ng Sierra Madre	
1985	Unang Karanasan	
1985	Musmos	
1985	Baun Gang	
1985	Celeste Gang: Hulihin si Mortemer 'Bitoy' Marcelo	
1985	The Sangley Point Robbery	Putol
1985	Boboy Tibayan, Tigre ng Cavite	Cardo
1986	Isusumpa Mo ang Araw Nang Isilang Ka	
1986	Unang Gabi	
1986	Anak ng Supremo	Major General Rivera
1986	Tatak ng Yakuza	
1986	Super Islaw and the Flying Kids	Lucas
1986	Materyales Fuertes	
1986	Magkayakap sa Magdamag	
1986	Isang Kumot Tatlong Unan	
1986	Hayok	
1986	Desperada	
1986	Bold Star	
1986	Ang Walang Malay	
1986	Ang Galit Ko'y... Sumagad sa Laman, Tumagos sa Buto	
1986	Sabik Kasalanan Ba?	Miguel
1987	Victor Corpuz	
1987	Vengeance Squad	
1987	Tag-Init... Nagpuputik ang Langit	
1987	Maruso: Robinhood ng Angeles City	Boy Zapanta
1987	Hudas	
1987	Humanda Ka... Ikaw ang Susunod	
1987	Lala	
1988	Ang Anino ni Asedillo	Tandang Birong
1988	Classified Operation	

=== Camera and electrical department ===
Year	Title
1981	Uhaw sa Dagat

== Sources ==
- Danny Villanueva (1994). "Philippine Film". In Nicanor Tiongson (ed.). CCP Encyclopedia of Philippine Art. Vol. VIII (1st ed.). Manila: Cultural Center of the Philippines. p. 243. ISBN 971-8546-31-6.
