= Gregorio Valdez Memorial Award =

Filipino film awards

The Filipino Academy of Movie Arts and Sciences bestowed the Gregorio Valdez Memorial Award to Filipino producers and film industry leaders of distinction whose body of films produced and/or film industry achievements have given merit to the Filipino film industry as a whole, as well as Filipino film producers in other countries whose body of work is recognized in that particular country.

== Recipients ==
- 1972 Joseph Estrada
- 1974 Guillermo de la Vega
- 1980 Eddie Garcia
- 1982 Marichu Perez - Maceda
- 1987 Manuel Morato
