= Gherome Ejercito =

Filipino basketball player (born 1977)

Personal information
- Born: March 19, 1977 (age 49)
- Listed height: 6 ft 2 in (1.88 m)
- Listed weight: 185 lb (84 kg)

Career information
- High school: Philippine Pasay Chung Hua Academy (Pasay); Mapúa (Manila)
- College: Adamson
- PBA draft: 2000: Undrafted
- Playing career: 1998–2009
- Position: Point guard / shooting guard
- Number: 14, 9

Career history
- 1998: Pampanga Dragons
- 1999: San Juan Knights
- 2000–2001: Talk 'N Text Phone Pals
- 2002–2005: FedEx Express
- 2005: Red Bull Barako
- 2008–2009: Rain or Shine Elasto Painters

Career highlights
- 2× PBA All-Star (2000, 2001)

Gherome Eric Angeles Ejercito (Tagalog pronunciation: [ʔɛˌhɛːɾ.sɪˈto]; born March 19, 1977) is a Filipino former professional basketball player. He last played for the Rain or Shine Elasto Painters in the Philippine Basketball Association (PBA). He first played from the Pampanga Dragons in the Metropolitan Basketball Association, then won the championship team in 1998 and later played for the San Juan Knights in 1999. He is the son of actor Jorge Ejercito ("George Estregan") and the half-brother of actor-politicians E. R. Ejercito and Gary Estrada.

After his PBA career, Ejercito played for the rookie team Bureau of Customs Transformers in the UNTV Cup Season 5. He was hailed Best Player of the Game twice, with one of them because of his half-court buzzer beater game-winning shot against the House of Representatives Solons. His team reached the semifinals, ending up in fourth place and donating ₱500,000 to their beneficiary Caritas Manila, Inc.

In 2016, Ejercito ran for board member of 1st district of Laguna under United Nationalist Alliance. However, he lost, placing 6th out of the 3 seats up for election.
