= Gary Estrada =

Filipino actor and politician (born 1971)

The Honorable Gary Jason B. Ejercito

Member of the Quezon Provincial Board from the 2nd district
- In office June 30, 2010 – June 30, 2016

Personal details
- Born: Gary Jason Bocaling Ejercito; May 16, 1971 (age 55) Philippines
- Party: Pwersa ng Masang Pilipino
- Spouse: Bernadette Allyson (m. 2001)
- Relations: Ejercito family
- Children: 4 (including Kiko)
- Profession: Actor; politician

Gary Jason Bocaling Ejercito (Tagalog pronunciation: [ʔɛˌhɛːɾ.sɪˈto]; born May 16, 1971), better known as Gary Estrada, is a Filipino actor and politician. He was a former talent of Viva Films during his early years, starring in action and drama films. He is also a politician, having served as a Board Member of Quezon's 2nd District from 2010 to 2016. He also unsuccessfully ran for vice mayor of Cainta, Rizal in 2019.

== Personal life ==
Estrada was born as Gary Jason Bocaling Ejercito on May 16, 1971 in the Philippines to actor Jorge M. Ejercito ("George Estregan") and actress Avelina Bocaling ("Agnes Moran"). He is the half-brother of Emilio Ramon Ejercito and Gherome Ejercito.

He is married to Bernadette Allyson with whom he has three daughters, Garielle Bernice, Garianna Beatrice and Gianna Bettina. He has one son Kiko Estrada from a previous relationship with actress Cheska Diaz.

He courted Dina Bonnevie from 1992 to 1993. He was in an on-and-off relationship with then-fellow Viva artist Donita Rose from 1993 to 1997.

== Filmography ==
=== Film ===
Year	Title	Role
1990	Tiny Terrestrial: The Three Professors	
1991	Boyong Mañalac: Hoodlum Terminator	
1992	Angelito San Miguel at ang Mga Batang City Jail	
1992	Jesus dela Cruz at ang Mga Batang Riles	
1992	Tag-araw, Tag-ulan	
1992	Apoy sa Puso	
1992	Blue Jeans Gang	
1993	Kapag Iginuhit ang Hatol sa Puso	
1993	Hanggang Saan... Hanggang Kailan	
1993	Parañaque Bank Robbery (Joselito Yuseco Story)	
1994	Bratpack (Mga Pambayad Atraso)	
1994	Kadenang Bulaklak	
1994	Pangako ng Kahapon	
1994	Anghel Na Walang Langit	
1995	Campus Girls	Bogs
1995	Joe D'Mango's Love Notes, the Movie	Mike
1995	Jessica Alfaro Story	
1995	The Grepor Butch Belgica Story	Friend of Butch
1996	Dyesebel	Juno
1996	Ober da Bakod 2 (Da Treasure Adbentyur)	Beast
1996	Dead Sure	Sonny Reyes
1996	Ikaw Naman ang Iiyak	Santi Reyes
1996	Do Re Mi	Toto
1997	Bayad Puri	Raymond
1997	Strict ang Peyrents Ko	Isagani
1998	Pagnanasa	
1999	Dibdiban ang Laban	
1999	Mister Mo, Lover Ko	Noel
1999	Gamugamong Dagat	
1999	Sutla	Rolando
2000	Senswal	Butch
2000	Madame X	Alex Florendo
2000	Waray	Asiong
2000	Garapal	Vasquez Rago (Dengcoy)
2001	Duwag Lang ang Sumusuko!	Jun Serrano
2001	Booba	Poli
2001	Oras Na para Lumaban	Patrick Sioson
2002	Masarap Na Pugad	Gareth
2002	Gising Na si Adan	Lt. Adrian Crisologo
2003	You and Me Against the World	Rocky
2003	Sa Piling ng Mga Belyas	
2003	www.XXX.com	Rick
2012	El Presidente	Col. José Tagle
2023	Loyalista: The Untold Story of Imelda Papin	Bong Carrion

=== Television ===
Year	Title	Role
1996–97	Mia Gracia	
1997	Tropang Trumpo	
1998–99	Dear Heart	
2001	Ikaw Lang ang Mamahalin	Red Peralta
2001	Biglang Sibol, Bayang Impasibol	
2003	Hawak Ko ang Langit	
2003–04	Sana'y Wala Nang Wakas	Richard Valencia
2003–04	Walang Hanggan	
2003–04	May Puso Ang Batas	
2004	Ikaw Sa Puso Ko	
2004–05	Mulawin	Rasmus
2005–06	Kung Mamahalin Mo Lang Ako	
2005–06	Etheria: Ang Ikalimang Kaharian ng Encantadia	Meno
2006	Encantadia: Pag-ibig Hanggang Wakas	Meno
2006–07	Mars Ravelo's Captain Barbell	Tenorio / Tetano
2006	Pinakamamahal	Ricardo Padua
2006	Magpakailanman	
2007	Impostora	Delfin Carreon
2007	Lupin	Captain Rosas
2007–08	Sine Novela: Pasan Ko ang Daigdig	Kadyo
2008	Sine Novela: Kaputol ng Isang Awit	Julio Ambrosio
2008	Obra	Joma
2008–09	Sine Novela: Saan Darating ang Umaga?	Dindo Rodrigo
2009	Dear Friend	Arnold
2009	Rosalinda	Javier Perez
2010	Maynila	
2010–11	Bantatay	Simon Rosales
2010	Untold Stories Mula sa Face to Face	
2010	Star Confessions	
2011	Agimat: Ang Mga Alamat ni Ramon Revilla: Kapitan Inggo	Victor Martinez
2011	Elena M. Patron's Blusang Itim	Gerald Escote
2011–12	Ruben Marcelino's Kokak	Renato Asuncion
2013	Maalaala Mo Kaya: Orasan	Freddie
2013	Akin Pa Rin Ang Bukas	Roel Villacorta
2014	Paraiso Ko'y Ikaw	Efren
2014	Carmela	Ernesto "Erning" Trinidad
2014	The Ryzza Mae Show	Himself
2016–17	Alyas Robin Hood	Carlos "Caloy" De Jesus
2018	The Stepdaughters	Hernando "Hernan" Salvador
2022	Raising Mamay	Randy Renancia
2023–24	Black Rider	Police Maj. Gen. Wilfredo "Fredo" Policarpio
2025–26	Cruz vs Cruz	Noah Salvador
