= List of Philippine films of the 1980s =

This is a list of films produced in the Philippines in the 1980s. For an A-Z see Category:Philippine films.

== 1980 ==
Film	Director	Producer	Cast	Genre	Production company
1980
4 na Maria					
Pangkat: Do or Die					
Tres Manos					
Pompa	Lauro Pacheco		Julie Vega	Comedy, drama, fantasy	Larry Santiago Productions, Inc.
Love Affair					
Kodigo Penal: The Valderama Case					
Beach House					
Nakaw na Pag-ibig					
Totoy Balasa					
Problem Child					
Darna at Ding					
Aguila	Eddie Romero	Eddie Romero, Rafel M. Fabie, Rolando S. Atienza	Fernando Poe Jr., Christopher de Leon	Period epic	Bancom Audiovision
Peter Maknat	AVP		Chiquito, Coney Reyes Mumar, Ramil Rodriguez, Tintoy	Comedy	Archer Productions
Superhand: Shadow of the Dancing Master					
Miss X	Gil Portes		Vilma Santos	Drama	Sining Silangan Inc.
Pinoy Boxer					
Tanikala	Marilou Diaz-Abaya		Susan Roces, Romeo Vasquez, Eddie Garcia, Rita Gomez	Romantic drama	Cine Filipinas Productions
Away Na, Asiong Aksaya					
Nympha					
Pagbabalik ng mga Tigre					
Salamat... Kapatid Ko!					
Si Malakas, si Maganda at si Mahinhin					
Dolphy's Angels					
Palawan					
Ang Bobo Kong Genie					
Milyon					
Bubot na Bayabas					
Candy					
Unang Yakap					
Puga					
Enteng-Anting					
Disco Madhouse					
Magnong Barumbado					
Pedrong Palaka					
Boy Singkit					
Hoy, Tukso Layuan Mo Ako!					
Yakapin Mo 'ko, Lalaking Matapang (Ang Senyorita at ang Tsuper)	Emmanuel H. Borlaza		Vilma Santos, Lito Lapid	Action, romance	Mirick Films International
Kamandag ng Alakdan					
Ang Bagong Kardong Kidlat					
Lasing Master					
Darling, Buntis Ka Na Naman!					
Girlfriend					
John & Marsha '80					
Six Million Centavo Man					
Ang Leon at ang Kuting					
Hepe					
...Kasal?					
Palaban	Eddie Romero		Amalia Fuentes, Alma Moreno, Ting Jocson, Baby Delgado, Joseph Estrada, Claire Felicen, Joonee Gamboa, Eddie Garcia	Action, drama	
Reyna ng Pitong Gatang					
Palaban					
Iwahig					
Uhaw sa Kalayaan					
Barkada					
Kilabot sa Labanan					
Temptation Island	Joey Gosiengfiao	Lily Monteverde	Dina Bonnevie, Azenith Briones, Jennifer Cortez, Bambi Arambulo, Deborah Sun	Adventure, comedy, fantasy	Regal Films
Gabi ng Lagim Ngayon					
Ito ang Babae					
Ako...Laban sa Lahat!					
Jim Nichols, Alyas Boy Kano					
Puwede Ba Utol, Akin Siya?					
Bongga Ka 'Day					
Evening Class					
Target: Kanang Kamay ni Nardo					
Katorse					
Mission: Terrorize Panay					
Andres de Saya					
Sampaguitang Walang Bango					
Kristo Zapata	Artemio Marquez		Lito Lapid, Melanie Marquez	Action	GPS Films
Kanto Boy					
Kakaba-Kaba Ka Ba?					
Totoy Boogie					
Sa Akin Ka... Magpakasal!					
Tatak Angustia					
Wild Animals					
Nang Bumuka ang Sampaguita					
Kastilyong Buhangin					
Kosa					
Ang Galing-Galing Mo... Mrs. Jones					
Pag-ibig Ko, Hatiin Ninyo					
Kalibre .45	Nilo Saez	Jesse Chua, Chua Limco	Fernando Poe Jr., Lito Lapid, Jennifer Cortez, Paquito Diaz, Dick Israel, Eddie Garcia	Action	Mirick Films International
Ang Kabiyak					
Juan Tamad, Junior					
Anak ng Atsay	Lauro Pacheco		Nora Aunor, Julie Vega, Dante Rivero	Drama	Larry Santiago Productions
Diborsyada					
Mr. One-Two-Three					
Gusto Kita, Mahal Ko Siya					
Rocky Tu-Log					
Wanted: Wives					
Ang Agila at ang Falcon					
Sugat sa Ugat					
Under-Age					
Alaga					
Tres Kantos					
Pag-ibig na Walang Dangal					
The Quick Brown Fox					
Broken Home					
Angela Markado	Lino Brocka		Hilda Koronel, Johnny Delgado, Rez Cortez, Ruel Vernal, Tonio Gutierrez, Dave Brodett, Celia Rodriguez, Raoul Aragon	Crime, drama, thriller	Four Seasons Films International
Sa Pagitan ng Dalawang Diablo					
Inong, Taxi Driver					
Waikiki					
Romansa					
Tacio					
Tatlong Hari					
Sa Init ng Apoy					
Manila by Night	Ishmael Bernal	Lily Monteverde	Charito Solis, Alma Moreno, Lorna Tolentino	Drama	Regal Films
Pangkat De Sabog					
Wander Woman si Ako					
Iskul Bukol (Freshmen)					
Kaladkarin					
Boy Negro					
Playmates					
Nognog					
Estibador					
Anak ng Maton					
Taga sa Panahon	Augusto Buenaventura		Christopher de Leon, Bembol Roco, Chanda Romero, Cherie Gil, Suzette Ranillo, Michael de Mesa	Drama	
Dang-Dong					
Kung Ako'y Iiwan Mo	Laurice Guillen		Nora Aunor, Christopher de Leon, Rollie Quizon		
Kape't Gatas					
Tembong					
Brutal	Marilou Diaz-Abaya		Amy Austria, Gina Alajar, Charo Santos, Jay Ilagan	Drama	Bancom Audiovision
Ang Panday	Ronwaldo Reyes	FPJ	Fernando Poe Jr., Liz Alindogan, Paquito Diaz, Max Alvarado, Lito Anzures, Bentot Jr.	Fantasy	FPJ Productions
Langis at Tubig	Danny L. Zialcita		Vilma Santos, Dindo Fernando, Amy Austria	Drama, romance	
Basag					
Bona	Lino Brocka	Nora Aunor	Nora Aunor, Phillip Salvador	Drama	NV Productions

== 1981 ==
Film	Director	Producer	Cast	Genre	Production company
1981
Pamilya Antik					
Bantay-Salakay					
Rampador Alindog (Barako ng Cavite)					
Brusko					
Kamakalawa	Eddie Romero		Christopher de Leon, Tetchie Agbayani, Raoul Aragonn, Apeng Daldal, Ruben Rustia, Jimmy Santos	Action, adventure	
Bihagin: Bilibid Boys					
Boy Ulo ng Tondo					
Tartan					
Mga Pambato					
Nakakaaliw, Nakakabaliw					
Ermitaño					
Playgirl					
Deadly Brothers					
Kaliwete Brothers					
Kamay ni Hilda					
Tikboy En Pamboy					
Blue Jeans					
Iskorokotoy					
Stariray					
Kamaong Asero					
High School Scandal	Gil Portes		Gina Alajar, Sandy Andolong, Ting Jocson, Greggy Liwag	Drama	
Uhaw ng Dagat					
Ang Babaing Hinugot sa Aking Tadyang					
Bangkusay, Tondo, 1950					
Mga Basang Sisiw					
Bakit Bughaw ang Langit?					
Kamandag ng Rehas na Bakal					
Sierra Madre					
Age Doesn't Matter					
Wild					
Takbo... Peter... Takbo	A.V.P.		Chiquito, Coney Reyes Mumar, George Estregan, Baby Delgado, Martha Sevilla, Rodolfo 'Boy' Garcia, Tintoy	Comedy	Archer Productions
Kalabang Mortal					
Tambay sa Disco					
Kontrobersyal!	Lino Brocka		Phillip Salvador, Charo Santos-Concio, Gina Alajar, Dennis Roldan	Drama	Four Seasons Films International
Police Informer: Totoy Guwapo					
Ang Milyonaryong Gipit					
Totoo ba ang Tsismis?					
Asal Hayop					
Showbiz Scandal					
Palpak Connection					
A Man Called Tolongges	Angel Labra		Pia Moran, Cachupoy, Redford White, George Javier, Cynthia Gonzales	Action, comedy, romance	Bukang Liwayway Films
Basagulero ang Lover Ko					
Hantingan					
Atraso: Totong Aso					
Cuatro y Media					
Alfredo Sebastian					
Boogie					
Ex-Wife					
Laya					
Kumander Surot					
Shoot the Killer!					
Mang Kepweng					
Rosang Tatak					
Cover Girls					
Oh, My Mama					
Ako ang Hari					
Mahinhin vs. Mahinhin					
Geronimo					
Ibalik ang Swerti!					
Wanted: Sabas ang Kilabot					
Dakpin si... Pusa (Ang Kilabot)					
Agent 00					
Pakawalan Mo Ako					
Kumander Alibasbas					
Flor de Liza					
Bata Pa Si Sabel					
Da Best in Da West	Romy Villaflor		Dolphy, Lito Lapid, Yehlen Catral, Nina Sara, Panchito, Romy Diaz, Weng Weng, Max Alvarado, Rodolfo "Boy" Garcia, Paquito Diaz	Action comedy	RVQ Productions
Hari ng Stunt	Carlo J. Caparas		Dante Varona, Vivian Velez, Rod Navarro, Romy Diaz, Rodolfo "Boy" Garcia, Joe Garcia, Bobby Talabis, Dave Brodett, Marie Grace Santos, Vic Varrion	Action	Amazaldy Film Productions
Death Row					
I Confess					
Pick-Up Girls					
Pepeng Shotgun	Romy Suzara		Rudy Fernandez, Mark Gil, George Estregan, Tetchie Agbayani	Action, drama	Sining Silangan Inc.
Burgis					
Tenyente Pugot (Bayani o Berdugo?)					
Legs, Katawan, Babae					
Ten Little Indians					
Ang Taong Bundok					
Bulldog					
Carnival Queen	Gil Portes		Alma Moreno, William Martinez, Martha Sevilla	Drama, romance	Amore Films
Nagbabagang Lupa... Nagbabagang Araw					
Viva Santiago					
Kapwa Simaron					
Estong Balisong					
Pabling					
Landong Kabal					
Dirty Games					
Dear Heart					
Mr. One-Two-Three Part 2	Mike Relon Makiling		Tito Sotto, Vic Sotto, Joey de Leon, Yehlen Catral, Liz Alindogan, Anna Marie Gutierrez, Carmi Martin	Comedy	GP Films
Totoy Scarface					
Bilibid Gays					
Lukso ng Dugo					
Magkasangga					
Salome					
Boni & Klayd	Angel Labra		Redford White, Panchito, Chicháy, Cachupoy, Pia Moran	Comedy, crime	Bukang Liwayway Films
Dugong Mandirigma					
Quintin Bilibid					
Hotel House Detective					
Bawal					
Ang Maestro					
Hello, Young Lovers					
San Basilio					
Hot Nights					
Dalaga si Misis, Binata si Mister					
Deadly Commandos					
Panlaban: Dos Por Dos					
Boljak					
Tondo Girl					
Kahit Ako'y Lupa					
Rosa ng Candaba					
Sidewalk Queen					
Dancing Master 2: Macao Connection					
Iligpit: Pepe Magtanggol (Terror of Bicol)					
Summer Love					
Harabas Is Still My Name					
Sambahin ang Ngalan Mo					
Gaano Kita Kamahal					
D'Gradweyts					
Dos Bravos					
Free to Love					
Babalik Ka Rin					
I Love You, Abigael					
K-9 Hunts Takas					
Kasalanan Ba?					
Labanang Lalaki					
Limbas ng Cavite					
The Betamax Story					
Adiong Bulutong	A.V.P.		Chiquito, Coney Reyes Mumar, Philip Gamboa, Mitosdel Mundo, Tintoy	Comedy	Archer Productions
Hiwalay					
Huk Hunter 1946-50					
Kumusta Ka, Hudas?					
Sinisinta Kita, Di Ka Kumikibo!	Angel Labra		Redford White, Pia Moran	Action	Lotus Films
For Y'ur Height Only					
Mag-Toning Muna Tayo					
P.S. I Love You					
Bandido sa Sapang Bato					
9 de Pebrero, Moriones, Tondo					
Kami'y Ifugao					
Bertong Barako					
Kambal sa Baril					
Caught in the Act					
Titser's Pet					
Hanapin si Jake Romano					
Sisang Tabak					
Mister Kwekong (Driver ng Punerarya)					
Ikaw O... Ako					
Batikan					
Patok					
Iskul Bukol 2 (Sophomore)					
Tatlong Baraha	Lito Lapid		Lito Lapid, Rey Lapid, Efren Lapid	Action	Lotus Films
Ang Pagbabalik ni Emma Henry					
Pagbabalik ng Panday	Ronwaldo Reyes		Fernando Poe Jr., Tina Revilla, Max Alvarado, Bentot Jr., Rosemarie Gil, Lito Anzures, Lilian Laing, Sarah Cariño	Fantasy	FPJ Productions
Ang Babae sa Ulog					
Init o Lamig					
Kamlon					
Karma					
Rock 'n' Roll					
Indio					
Tropang Bulilit	J. Erastheo Navoa		Niño Muhlach, Sheryl Cruz, Andrea Bautista, Janice de Belen, Lea Salonga	Comedy-drama	D'Wonder Films
Kisapmata	Mike De Leon		Vic Silayan, Jay Ilagan, Charo Santos, Charito Solis	Drama	Bancom Audiovision

== 1982 ==
Film	Director	Producer	Cast	Genre	Production company
1982
Oro, Plata, Mata	Peque Gallaga	Charo Santos-Concio	Sandy Andolong, Cherie Gil, Liza Lorena, Fides Cuyugan-Asencio, Manny Ojeda, Maya Valdez	Drama	Experimental Cinema of the Philippines
Relasyon	Ishmael Bernal	Lily Y. Monteverde	Vilma Santos, Christopher de Leon	Drama	Regal Films
Sinasamba Kita	Eddie Garcia		Vilma Santos, Christopher De Leon, Phillip Salvador	Drama	Viva Films
Pretty Boy Charlie	Maria Saret		Anthony Alonzo, Chanda Romero, Isabel Rivas, Rodolfo 'Boy' Garcia, Romy Diaz, Zeny Zabala, Anita Linda, Ruben Rustia, Rey Sagum, Danny Riel	Action	APG Films
Batch '81	Mike de Leon	Marichu Maceda	Mark Gil, Sandy Andolong	Drama	MVP Pictures
Desire	Eddie Romero	Eddie Romero	Tetchie Agbayani, Butz Aquino	Drama	Hemisphere Pictures
Gaano Kadalas ang Minsan?	Danny Zialcita	Ramon Salvador	Vilma Santos, Hilda Koronel, Dindo Fernando, Suzanne Gonzales, Joseph Alvin Enriquez, Angie Ferro, Odette Khan, Mario Escudero, Ven Medina, Gloria Romero	Romantic drama	Viva Films
Haplos	Butch Perez		Vilma Santos, Christopher de Leon, Rio Locsin	Drama, horror, romance	
Himala	Ishmael Bernal	Bibsy N. Carballo, Charo Santos-Concio	Nora Aunor, Spanky Manikan, Gigi Dueñas, Amable Quiambao, Vangie Labalan, Veronica Panlileo, Peng Medina	Drama	Experimental Cinema of the Philippines
Moral	Marilou Diaz-Abaya		Gina Alajar, Sandy Andolong, Lorna Tolentino	Drama	Seven Stars Production
Ang Panday: Ikatlong Yugto	Ronwaldo Reyes		Fernando Poe Jr., Criselda Cecilio, Lito Anzures, Bentot Jr.	Fantasy	FPJ Productions
Santa Claus is Coming to Town	Elwood Perez		Snooky Serna, Maricel Soriano, Gabby Concepcion, William Martinez, Albert Martinez, Robert Arevalo, Liza Lorena, Marissa Delgado, Raul Aragon, Alicia Alonzo, Mila Ocampo, Johnny Wilson, Joel Alano, Aiko Melendez, Kristine Garcia	Comedy	Regal Films

== 1983 ==
Film	Director	Producer	Cast	Genre	Production company
1983
Bago Kumalat ang Kamandag	Willy Milan		Anthony Alonzo, Coney Reyes, Eddie Garcia	Action	
Broken Marriage	Ishmael Bernal	Lily Y. Monteverde	Vilma Santos, Christopher de Leon, Orestes Ojeda	Drama	Regal Films
Dugong Buhay	Carlo J. Caparas		Ramon Revilla, Bong Revilla, Imelda Ilanan	Action	Viva Films
Iiyak Ka Rin	Gil Portes	Robbie Tan	Julie Vega, Edgar Mande, Rey 'PJ' Abellana, Leni Santos	Drama, romance	Seiko Films
Init sa Magdamag	Laurice Guillen		Lorna Tolentino, Joel Torre, Dindo Fernando	Drama, romance	Viva Films
Karnal	Marilou Diaz-Abaya		Charito Solis, Phillip Salvador, Vic Silayan, Joel Torre, Cecille Castillo	Horror	
Minsan Pa Nating Hagkan Ang Nakaraan	Marilou Diaz-Abaya	Ramon Salvador	Vilma Santos, Christopher De Leon, Eddie Garcia	Drama, romance	Viva Films
Nagalit ang Buwan sa Haba ng Gabi	Danny Zialcita		Laurice Guillen, Gloria Diaz, Dindo Fernando, Eddie Garcia, Janice de Belen	Drama	
Saan Darating ang Umaga?	Maryo J. de los Reyes		Nida Blanca, Nestor de Villa, Maricel Soriano	Drama	Viva Films
Roman Rapido	Argel Joseph		Fernando Poe Jr., Criselda "Dang" Cecilio	Action, drama, war	BSH Films, LVN Pictures
Tengteng De Sarapen	Frank Gray Jr.		Dolphy, Alma Moreno, Panchito, Jaypee de Guzman, Raoul Aragonn, Bayani Casimiro, Teroy de Guzman, Palito, Ben David, Rocco Montalban, Larry Silva, Allan Bautista, Max Vera	Comedy	RVQ Productions
Turumba	Kidlat Tahimik	Kidlat Tahimik	Homer Abiad, Iñigo Vito, Maria Pehipol, Patricio Abari, Bernarda Pacheco	Drama	Kidlat-Kulog Productions, Tellux Film
Utol	Carlo J. Caparas		Vic Vargas, Efren Reyes Jr., Bert Olivar, Berting Labra	Action	CJC Film Productions

== 1984 ==
Film	Director	Producer	Cast	Genre	Production company
1984
Atsay Killer, Buti Nga sa 'Yo	Angel Labra		Eddie Garcia, Panchito, Cachupoy, Fauzi Omar	Comedy	Sittis Films
Bagets	Maryo J. de los Reyes	Vic del Rosario Jr.	William Martinez, Herbert Bautista, Raymond Lauchengco, J.C. Bonnin, Aga Muhlach	Youth-oriented	VIVA Films
Dagta	Joey del Rosario		Anna Marie Gutierrez, Rodolfo Boy Garcia	Drama	
Huwag Kang Papatay!	Pepe Marcos		Rio Locsin, Johnny Delgado, Angela Perez, Ace Vergel	Action, drama	Bukang Liwayway Films
Batuigas II: Pasukuin si Waway	Manuel 'Fyke' Cinco	Charo S. Concio	Rudy Fernandez, George Estregan, Johnny Delgado, Ma. Isabel Lopez, Susan Valdez, Joonee Gamboa, Ronnie Lazaro, Melinda Mendez, Abbo dela Cruz, Baldo Marro	Action	Vanguard Films
Goodah	Mike Relon Makiling		Tito Sotto, Vic Sotto, Joey de Leon	Comedy	Seiko Films
Kapitan Inggo	Jose Yandoc		Ramon Revilla, Marissa Delgado, Susan Valdez-LeGoff	Adventure	Imus Productions
This Is My Country	Lino Brocka	Véra Belmont	Phillip Salvador, Gina Alajar, Carmi Martin, Claudia Zobel, Raoul Aragon, Paquito Diaz, Rez Cortez, Lorli Villanueva, Ariosto Reyes Jr., Mona Lisa	Drama	Malaya Films, Stéphan Films
Daddy's Little Darlings	Luciano B. Carlos		Dolphy, Coney Reyes Mumar, Snooky, Maricel Soriano, Julie Vega, Janice de Belen, Panchito, William Martinez, Albert Martinez, Edgar Mande	Comedy, drama	Regal Films
Sister Stella L.	Mike De Leon	Lily Monteverde	Vilma Santos, Jay Ilagan, Gina Alajar, Laurice Guillen, Tony Santos, Anita Linda, Liza Lorena, Ruben Rustia, J. Eddie Infante, Adul de Leon	Drama	Regal Films
Basag ang Pula	Ben G. Yalung		Ace Vergel, Maria "Snooky" Serna, Liza Lorena, Armida Siguion-Reyna, Angela Perez, George Estregan, Bomber Moran, Arnold Mendoza, Melissa Mendez, Maritess Samson	Horror	Cine Suerte
Lovingly Yours, Helen (The Movie)	Argel Joseph		Coney Reyes Mumar, Ariosto Reyes Jr., Carmi Martin, Chiquito, Anita Linda, Fred Montilla, Johnny Wilson, Rez Cortez, Lito Anzures, Luz Fernandez	Drama anthology	B.S.H. Films
'Merika	Gil Portes		Nora Aunor, Bembol Roco	Drama	Adrian Films
Hoy! Wala Kang Paki	Manuel Conde Jr.	Bibsy M. Carballo; Baby K. Jimenez	Susan Roces, Bert 'Tawa' Marcelo, Maya Valdes, Nanette Inventor, Dranreb Belleza, Rodolfo "Boy" Garcia, Bayani Casimiro, Dexter Doria, Palito, Moody Diaz, Manny Castañeda	Comedy	Twin Bee, Vanguard Films
Condemned	Mario O'Hara		Nora Aunor, Dan Alvaro	Drama, suspense, film noir	NCV Productions
Bagets 2	Maryo J. de los Reyes	Vic del Rosario Jr.	William Martinez, Herbert Bautista, Raymond Lauchengco, Francis Magalona	Youth-oriented	VIVA Films
Kaya Kong Abutin ang Langit	Maryo J. de los Reyes		Maricel Soriano, Charito Solis, Ronaldo Valdez	Drama	V.H. Films
Sariwa	Danilo Cabreira		Olivia Ortiz, Raoul Aragon, Lita Gutierrez, Orestes Ojeda, Robert Campos, Dexter Doria, Julio Diaz	Drama	JPM Productions
Sigaw ng Katarungan	Pablo Santiago		Fernando Poe Jr., Eddie Garcia, Mario Montenegro, Raoul Aragon, Paquito Diaz, Max Alvarado, Ruel Vernal		Tri-Films
Ang Padrino	Ronwaldo Reyes	Fernando Poe Jr.	Fernando Poe Jr., Coney Reyes	Action	FPJ Productions
Erpat Kong Forgets	J. Erastheo Navoa		Aga Muhlach, Janice de Belen, Eddie Garcia, Carmi Martin, Arlene Muhlach	Comedy	D' Wonder Films, Inc.
Bukas... May Pangarap	Gil Portes		Gina Alajar, Tommy Abuel		Tri-Films
Bulaklak sa City Jail	Mario O'Hara		Nora Aunor, Gina Alajar	Crime	Cherubin Films
Idol	Romy Suzara		Rudy Fernandez, Chuckie Dreyfus, Connie Angeles, Dencio Padilla	Action, drama	Bukang Liwayway Films
Misteryo sa Tuwa	Abbo Q. Dela Cruz		Tony Santos Sr., Johnny Delgado, Ronnie Lazaro, Alicia Alonzo, Lito Anzures, Amable Quiambao, Maria Montes, Mario Taguiwalo, Arbee Antonio	Drama, thriller	
Muntinlupa 1958	Jose Antonio Alonzo		Anthony Alonzo, Marianne dela Riva, Fred Montilla, Tita Muñoz, Alicia Alonzo, Max Alvarado, Joonee Gamboa, Renato del Prado, Rodolfo Garcia	Action	Triple A Films
Ang Panday IV: Ika-Apat Na Aklat	Ronwaldo Reyes		Fernando Poe Jr., Marianne dela Riva, Lito Anzures, Bentot Jr., Eddie Infante, Max Alvarado, Mario Escudero, Robert Rivera, Ruben "Boy" Ramos, Aida Pedida	Fantasy action	FPJ Productions
Shake, Rattle & Roll	Ishmael Bernal, Emmanuel H. Borlaza, Peque Gallaga	Douglas Quijano	Joel Torre, Janice de Belen, Herbert Bautista, Rey 'PJ' Abellana, Charito Solis, Irma Alegre	Horror	Athena Productions

== 1985 ==
Film	Director	Producer	Cast	Genre	Production company
1985
Magchumikap Ka!	Luciano B. Carlos		Rod Navarro, Nova Villa, Lita Gutierrez, Freddie Webb, Chicháy, Dely Atay-Atayan, Tommy Abuel	Comedy	Seiko Films
Lalakwe					
Kapag Puso'y Sinugatan					
John en Marsha '85 (Sa Probinsya)	Jett Espiritu		Dolphy, Nida Blanca, Maricel Soriano	Comedy	RVQ Productions
Virgin Forest					
Sanay					
Lilac, Bulaklak sa Magdamag					
Kikirut-Kirot					
I Won! I Won! Ang S'werte nga Naman					
Matamis ang Nakaw na Tubig					
Sino si... Victor Lopez ng Bangkusay?					
Goodtime Girls					
Working Boys					
Bituing Walang Ningning					
Tender Age					
Dugo ng Pistoleros					
Isang Platitong Mani					
Ano Ka Hilo?					
Mga Paru-Parong Buking					
Zuma					
Sugat sa Dangal					
Ulo ng Gapo					
Hindi Nahahati ang Langit	Mike de Leon	Charo Santos-Concio	Christopher de Leon, Lorna Tolentino, Dina Bonnevie, Edu Manzano, Nestor de Villa, Gloria Romero, Chito Ponce-Enrile, Gigi de la Riva, Jimmy Javier, Marco Polo	Romantic drama	Vanguard Films
Ben Tumbling: A People's Journal Story	Diego Cagahastian		Lito Lapid, Vivian Velez, Suzanne Gonzales	Action, drama	Amazaldy Film Production
Goat Buster sa Templo ni Dune					
Sa Totoo Lang!					
Sa Dibdib ng Sierra Madre					
Naked Paradise					
Bilang Na ang Oras Mo	Manuel Cinco		Rudy Fernandez, George Estregan Sr., Donna Villa, Ronnie Lazaro, Dick Israel, Tony Bernal	Action	Sittis Films International
Inday Bote	Luciano B. Carlos		Maricel Soriano, William Martinez	Comedy, fantasy, romance	
Mission Order: Hulihin si ... Avelino Bagsic ang Rebelde	Ronald S. Ledesma			Action	RSL Film Movie Productions
Paradise Inn	Celso Ad. Castillo		Lolita Rodriguez, Vivian Velez	Drama	
Perfumed Garden	Celso Ad Castillo		Barbara Anne Kraffmann, Michael De Mesa, Dick Israel	Erotic, drama	Cine Suerte
Sangley Point Robbery	Manuel 'Fyke' Cinco	Charo S. Concio	Rudy Fernandez, Rio Locsin, Donna Villa, Robert Arevalo, Edu Manzano, George Estregan, Deborah Sun, Arnold Mendoza, Johnny Vicar, Ruben Rustia	Crime drama	Vanguard Films
Scorpio Nights	Peque Gallaga	Lily Y. Monteverde	Orestes Ojeda, Daniel Fernando, Anna Marie Gutierrez	Drama	Regal Films
Super Wan-Tu-Tri	Luciano B. Carlos		Tito Sotto, Vic Sotto, Joey de Leon	Comedy, family, fantasy	Regal Films
Tinik sa Dibdib	Leroy Salvador		Nora Aunor, Dina Bonnevie, Phillip Salvador	Drama	Viva Films

== 1986 ==
Film	Director	Producer	Cast	Genre	Production company
1986
Always and Forever	Danny Zialcita		Pops Fernandez, Martin Nievera	Drama, romance	Essex Films
Batang Quiapo	Pablo Santiago	Lily Y. Monteverde, Charo Santos-Concio, Malou N. Santos	Fernando Poe Jr., Maricel Soriano, Sheryl Cruz, Manilyn Reynes, Kristina Paner, Chuckie Dreyfus, Christopher Paloma, Mel Martinez, Anita Linda, Rez Cortez	Action	Regal Films
Captain Barbell	Leroy Salvador	Vic del Rosario Jr.	Edu Manzano, Herbert Bautista, Lea Salonga, Dennis Da Silva, Bing Loyzaga, Nova Villa, Ruel Vernal, Rez Cortez, Beth Bautista	Fantasy	Viva Films
Gabi Na, Kumander	Pepe Marcos	Ramon Salvador	Phillip Salvador, Dindo Fernando, Bembol Roco, Eddie Garcia, Efren Reyes Jr., Anna Marie Gutierrez, Jacklyn Jose, Sarsi Emmanuelle, Tony Santos Sr., Ruben Rustia	Action, drama, romance, war	Viva Films
James Bone: Agent 001	Ruben Ramos	URO	Palito, Melissa Mendez, Charlie Davao, Don Pepot, Joaquin Fajardo, Ruben Ramos, Eddie Llaneta, Clarissa Mojer, Liza Mojica	Action comedy	Jonrox Films, Larry Santiago Productions
Kailan Tama ang Mali?	Celso Ad. Castillo	Vic del Rosario Jr.	Pilar Pilapil, Elizabeth Oropesa, Rio Locsin	Drama	Viva Films
Kontra Bandido	J. Erastheo Navoa		Niño Muhlach, Ramon Zamora, Rey Malonzo, Paquito Diaz, Bernardo Bernardo, Janice Jurado, Lito Pastrana, Max Alvarado, Arlene Muhlach, Sabatini Fernandez	Action comedy	Autorama Films
Lumuhod Ka sa Lupa!	Manuel "Fyke" Cinco	Robbie Tan	Rudy Fernandez, Eddie Garcia, Jackie Lou Blanco, Mark Gil, Anita Linda, Ricky Davao, Rose Ann Gonzales, Romy Diaz, Abbo dela Cruz, Roberto Talabis	Action	Seiko Films
Muslim .357	Ronwaldo Reyes	Atty. Esperidion D. Laxa	Fernando Poe Jr., Eddie Garcia, Vivian Foz, Paquito Diaz, Eddie Arenas, Max Alvarado, Romy Diaz, Vic Diaz, Ruel Vernal, Jimmy Fabregas	Action	EDL Productions
Yesterday, Today & Tomorrow	Maning Borlaza		Vilma Santos, Snooky Serna, Maricel Soriano, Gabby Concepcion, Richard Gomez, Eddie Garcia, Chanda Romero, Liza Lorena, Rosemarie Gil, Romeo Rivera	Romantic drama	Regal Films

== 1987 ==
Film	Director	Producer	Cast	Genre	Production company
1987
Amang Hustler	Mike Relon Makiling		Rhene Imperial, Ramon Zamora, Philip Gamboa, Melissa Mendez, Robert Lee, Anita Linda	Crime action	
Balweg	Antonio Perez	Ramon Salvador	Phillip Salvador, Rio Locsin, Tetchie Agbayani, Johnny Delgado, Pinky Amador, Jose Romulo, Mon Godiz, Bebong Osorio, Eddie Infante, Baldo Marro	Biographical action drama	Viva Films
Barbaro Santo	Augusto Buenaventura	Ramon Salvador	Lito Lapid, Charlie Davao, Patrick de la Rosa, Rosemarie de Vera, Paquito Diaz, Romy Diaz, Ruben Rustia, Louella de Cordova, Rommel Valdez, Ernie Ortega	Action	LGB Productions
Bata-Batuta	Jett Espiritu		Dolphy, Alma Moreno, Vandolph, Panchito, Ricky Belmonte, Suzanne Gonzales, Rita Avila, Freddie Quizon, Odette Khan, Eric Quizon	Comedy	RVQ Productions
Black Magic	Mike Relon Makiling		Dolphy, Zsa Zsa Padilla, Jestoni Alarcon, Rita Avila, Ian Veneracion, Michael Locsin, Rose Ann Gonzales Jovit Moya, Jennifer Sevilla, Jaime Castillo	Comedy	Seiko Films
Feliciano Luces: Alyas Kumander Toothpick, Mindanao	Pablo Santiago	Rowell Santiago	Ramon Revilla, Dang Cecilio, Rey Abellana, Tanya Gomez, Paquito Diaz, Raoul Aragonn, Charlie Davao, Esther Chavez, Romy Diaz, Ruel Vernal	Action	Vista Films
Huminga Ka Na Hangga't Gusto Mo!	Wilfredo "Willy" Milan	Bella Demayuga	Daniel Fernando, Charito Solis, Leroy Salvador, Michael de Mesa, Lito Pimentel, Maila Gumila, Perla Bautista, Subas Herrero, Jobelle Salvador	Action	Bellestar Films
Huwag Mong Buhayin ang Bangkay	Mauro Gia Samonte		Charito Solis, Ricky Davao, Pinky Suarez, Rita Avila, Romnick Sarmenta, Jennifer Sevilla, Jojo Alejar, Jestoni Alarcon	Horror	Seiko Films
Kamandag ng Kris	Willy Milan		Dante Varona, Eddie Garcia, Ronnie Ricketts, John Regala, Aurora Sevilla, Kristel Romero, Dexter Doria, Joonee Gamboa, Usman Hassim, Princess Punzalan	Action	Bathala Films
Kapag Lumaban ang Api	Ronwaldo Reyes		Fernando Poe Jr., Rio Locsin, Vivian Foz, Lorraine Schuck, Miguel Rodriguez, Paquito Diaz, Philip Gamboa, Dencio Padilla, Augusto Victa, Ernie Zarate	Action	Lea Productions
Kapag Puno Na ang Salop	Arturo San Agustin	FPJ	Fernando Poe Jr., Eddie Garcia, Paquito Diaz, Jose Romulo, Dencio Padilla, Roy Alvarez, Rowena Moran, Lito Anzures, Jimmy Fabregas, Augusto Victa	Action	FPJ Productions
Kapitan Pablo: Cavite Killing Fields	Pepe Marcos		Ramon Revilla, Dang Cecilio, Marissa Delgado, Rose Ann Gonzales, Raoul Aragonn, Ruel Vernal, Conrad Poe, Rez Cortez, King Gutierrez, Leopoldo Salcedo	Action	RNB Films
Kung Aagawin Mo ang Lahat sa Akin	Eddie Garcia	Ramon Salvador	Sharon Cuneta, Jackie Lou Blanco, Tonton Gutierrez, Ricky Davao, Dante Rivero, Laurice Guillen, Alicia Alonzo, Francis Magalona, Ali Sotto	Drama	Viva Films
Maharlika	Jerr Hopper		Paul Burke, Dovie Beams, Farley Granger, Vic Diaz, Vic Silayan, Broderick Crawford, Rosa Mia, Dindo Fernando, Romeo Rivera	War	Nepomuceno Productions
My Bugoy Goes to Congress	Jett C. Espiritu	Richard "Ricky" Valdes, Alfredo Baluyot Jr.	Dolphy, Nora Aunor, Eric Quizon, Panchito, Rachel Anne Wolfe, Paquito Diaz, Dencio Padilla, Babalu, Don Pepot, Tiya Pusit	Political comedy	RVQ Productions; Shining Star Productions
No Retreat... No Surrender... Si Kumander	Pablo Santiago	FPJ	Fernando Poe Jr., Susan Roces, Sheryl Cruz, Randy Santiago, Paquito Diaz, Bong Dimayacyac, Chichay, Dencio Padilla	Action comedy	FPJ Productions
Once Upon A Time	Peque Gallaga; Lore Reyes		Dolphy, Gloria Romero, Janice de Belen, Joel Torre, Lani Mercado	Adventure comedy	
Operation: Get Victor Corpus – The Rebel Soldier	Pablo Santiago	Charo Santos-Concio	Rudy Fernandez, Jay Ilagan, Sandy Andolong, Dang Cecilio, Ricky Davao, Rowell Santiago, George Estregan, Raoul Aragonn, Johnny Vicar, Charlie Davao	Biographical action	Vanguard Films
Oscar Ramos: Hitman	Efren C. Piñon	Ramon Salvador	Ramon Revilla, Vic Vargas, Marianne Dela Riva, Bong Dimayacyac, Carlos 'Sonny' Padilla Jr., Paquito Diaz, Mon Godiz, Baldo Marro, Louella de Cordova	Action	Viva Films
Pinulot Ka Lang sa Lupa	Ishmael Bernal		Maricel Soriano, Lorna Tolentino, Gabby Concepcion	Drama	Regal Films
Puto	Leroy Salvador	Ramon Salvador	Herbert Bautista, Janno Gibbs, Mia Prats, Dennis da Silva, Bing Loyzaga, Jigo Garcia, Gelie de Belen, Jayjay Salvador, Cathy Mora, Marita Zobel	Teen comedy	Viva Films
Ready!.. Aim!.. Fire!..	Mike Relon Makiling	Manuel Andres Yu	Tito Sotto, Vic Sotto, Joey de Leon, Joey Albert, Panchito Alba, Ike Lozada, Val Sotto, Mon Alvir, Zorayda Sanchez, Evelyn Vargas	Comedy	Cineventures
Tagos ng Dugo	Maryo J. de los Reyes		Vilma Santos, Michael de Mesa, Tony Santos Sr., Caridad Sanchez, Francis Arnaiz, Miguel Rodriguez, Lito Pimentel, Mark Joseph, Jose Hipolito, Joey Marquez	Thriller	VH Films
Target: Sparrow Unit	Ben "M7" Yalung	Romy "M3" Yalung	Ramon 'Bong' Revilla Jr., Ronnie Ricketts, Debbie Miller, Sonny Parsons, E.R. Ejercito, Allan Bautista, Dick Israel, King Gutierrez, Bomber Moran, Vic Diaz	Action	Cine Suerte
Ultimatum: Ceasefire!	Wilfredo Milan; Bert R. Mendoza; Jerry O. Tirazona		Ramon Revilla, Eddie Garcia, Marianne de la Riva, Aurora Sevilla, Conrad Poe, Nick Romano, Joonee Gamboa, Renato del Prado, Ernie Ortega, Lala Montelibano	Action	Urban Films
Walang Karugtong ang Nakaraan	Leroy Salvador	Ramon Salvador	Christopher de Leon, Sharon Cuneta, Carmi Martin, Chanda Romero, Ronaldo Valdez, Tommy Abuel, Ali Sotto, Katrin Gonzales, Johnny Wilson, Bella Flores	Romantic drama	Viva Films

== 1988 ==
Film	Director	Producer	Cast	Genre	Production company
1988
7 Pasiklab sa Army	Bill Baldridge		Redford White, Cachupoy, Don Pepot, Tatlong Itlog, Janice Jurado	Erotic war comedy	Arte Films
Afuang: Bounty Hunter	Mike Relon Makiling	Ramon Salvador	Phillip Salvador, Eddie Garcia, Marianne Dela Riva, Mark Gil, Charlie Davao, Zandro Zamora, Nanding Fernandez	Action	Viva Films
Agila ng Maynila	Pablo Santiago		Fernando Poe Jr., Vic Vargas, RR Herrera, Encar Benedicto, Paquito Diaz, Raoul Aragonn, Dencio Padilla, Vic Diaz	Action	FPJ Productions
Akyat Bahay Gang	Efren C. Piñon	Ramon Salvador	Lito Lapid, Zandro Zamora, Dick Israel, Lito Gruet, Chuck Perez, Jean Saburit, Angela Perez, Paquito Diaz, Crystal Piñon, Peck Piñon	Crime	Falcon Films
Alega Gang: Public Enemy No.1 of Cebu	Pepe Marcos	Mimi C. Bautista (supervising producer)	Ramon "Bong" Revilla Jr., Robin Padilla, Princess Punzalan, Beverly Vergel, Perla Bautista, Paquito Diaz, Zandro Zamora, Bomber Moran, Rommel Valdez, Joseph de Cordova	Crime action	RRJ Productions
Alyas Pusa: Ang Taong May 13 Buhay	Pablo Santiago		Ramon Revilla, Alona Alegre, Angela Perez, Paquito Diaz, Fred Moro, Jose Romulo, Johnny Vicar, Lucita Soriano, Joseph de Cordova, Vic Varrion	Action	Urban Films
Ambush	Francis 'Jun' Posadas		Ronnie Ricketts, Dick Israel, Sonny Parsons, E.R. Ejercito, Leo Lazaro, Bobby Zshornack, Beverly Vergel, Raoul Aragonn, Odette Khan, Johnny Wilson	Action	Regent Films
Angelica: Sugo sa Lupa	Poch Bautista; Monza	Dorothy Dizon	Sunshine, Dante Rivero, Romnick Sarmenta, Marianne de la Riva, Helen Vela, Marilou Bendigo, Anita Linda, Ike Lozada, Ramon Zamora, Harlene Bautista	Fantasy	DORIS; ACES Films
Ang Anino ni Asedillo	Bert Mendoza; Jose M. Dagumboy		Conrad Poe, Dante Rivero, George Estregan, Philip Gamboa, Carlos Salazar, Zandro Zamora, Beverly Vergel, Guia Guizon, Farrah Floro, Fernando Poe Jr.	Period action	D'Camp Films International
Babaing Hampaslupa	Mel Chionglo		Maricel Soriano, Janice de Belen, Gina Alajar, Richard Gomez, Edu Manzano, Rowell Santiago, Liza Lorena, Leni Santos, Carmina Villarroel	Romantic drama	Regal Films
Bakit Kinagat ni Adan ang Mansanas ni Eba?	Mike Relon Makiling		Dolphy, Beverly Vergel, Panchito Alba, Che-Che Sta. Ana, Nova Villa, Eric Francisco, Fatima Alvir, Moody Diaz, Zorayda Sanchez, Beverly Salviejo	Comedy	Urban Films
Bobo Cop	Tony Y. Reyes		Joey Marquez, Alice Dixson, Matet de Leon, Kristina Paner, Cris Villanueva, Atoy Co, Amy Perez, Willy Revillame, Panchito, Cachupoy	Action comedy	Regal Films
Boy Negro	Pepe Marcos	Ramon Salvador	Phillip Salvador, Dang Cecilio, Leopoldo Salcedo, Paquito Diaz, Raoul Aragonn, Ruel Vernal, Anita Linda, Mary Walter, Manjo del Mundo, Baldo Marro	Action	Viva Films
Bruno	Jun Raquiza		Max Laurel, Ken Snell, Jane Castellvi, Vicky Roa, Dan Corbe	Action	
Chinatown: Sa Kuko ng Dragon	Pepe Marcos	Niki Rose Nuqui	Ramon 'Bong' Revilla Jr., Tony Ferrer, Eddie Garcia, Aurora Sevilla, Mia Pratts, Rez Cortez, Christopher Paloma, Rommel Valdez, Baldo Marro, Ruben Rustia	Action	Four-N Films
Code Name: Black & White	Gayjee Pangan		Chiquito, Redford White, Pinky Marquez, Beverly Vergel, Bubbles Lin, Nieves Manuel, Angelo Ventura, Roy Alvarez, Paquito Diaz, Rocco Montalban	Action comedy	ABA Productions
Dongalo Massacre	Nilo Saez		Ramon 'Bong' Revilla Jr., Vic Vargas, Michael de Mesa, Ronnie Ricketts, Rachel Anne Wolfe, Philip Gamboa, Baldo Marro, Val Iglesias, Dick Israel, King 'Abdul' Gutierrez	Action	Serres Films
Dugo ng Pusakal	Manuel 'Fyke' Cinco	Arthur Ong, Patrick Lay	Anthony Alonzo, Eddie Rodriguez, Jean Saburit, Dante Rivero, Paquito Diaz, Romy Diaz, Zandro Zamora, Lito Anzures, Mon Godiz, Dick Israel	Action drama	Filipinas Productions
Sa Dulo ng Baril	Jerry O. Tirazona		Jess Lapid Jr., Lito Lazaro, Eric Borbon, Marithez Samson, Nick Romano, Danny Riel, Ronald Nepomuceno, Maita Sanchez, Robert Talby, Robert Miller	Action drama, historical	Super Nine Films International
Enteng the Dragon	Romy Villaflor		Dolphy, Vandolph, Dang Cecilio, Eddie Garcia, Monica Herrera, Monsour del Rosario, Rommel Valdez, Tsing Tong Tsai, Panchito, Babalu	Fantasy comedy	RVQ Productions
Gawa Na ang Bala Na Papatay sa Iyo	Willy Milan		Fernando Poe Jr., Vic Vargas, Marianne Dela Riva, Subas Herrero, Harlene Bautista, Rosemarie Gil, Paquito Diaz, Berting Labra, Tom Olivar, Johnny Vicar	Action	Lea Productions
Hamunin ang Bukas...	Chito B. Tapawan		Cherie Gil, Daniel Fernando, Odette Khan, Angie Ferro, Renato del Prado, Zorayda Sanchez, Tess Dumpit, Andro Guevarra, Mark Tiongson	Drama	
Hati Tayo sa Magdamag	Lupita A. Kashiwahara	Ramon Salvador	Edu Manzano, Tetchie Agbayani, Jacklyn Jose, Francis Magalona, Armida Siguion-Reyna, Caridad Sanchez, Eddie Rodriguez, Janice Jurado, Tina Loy, Junix Inocian	Romantic drama	Viva Films
Hiwaga sa Balete Drive	Peque Gallaga, Lorenzo A. Reyes		Jestoni Alarcon, Rita Avila, Mary Walter, Isabel Quiait, Zsa Zsa Padilla, Charito Solis, Joel Torre, Gina Alajar, Michael Locsin, Harlene Bautista, Ian Veneracion	Horror	Seiko Films
Huwag Mong Itanong Kung Bakit	Eddie Garcia	Ramon Salvador	Dina Bonnevie, Edu Manzano, Ricky Davao, Cherie Gil	Romance	Viva Films
I Love You 3x a Day	Mike Relon Makiling	Ramon Salvador	Jimmy Santos, Carmi Martin, Nova Villa, Ruffa Gutierrez, Jigo Garcia, Geli de Belen, Kimpee de Leon, Chenee de Leon, Dingdong Avanzado, Rene Requiestas	Fantasy comedy	Viva Films
Ibulong Mo sa Diyos	Elwood Perez		Vilma Santos, Gary Valenciano, Miguel Rodriguez, Eric Quizon, Nida Blanca, Eddie Garcia, Barbara Perez, Nadia Montenegro, Rachel Ann Wolfe, Perla Bautista	Romantic drama	Regal Films
Iyo ang Batas, Akin ang Katarungan	Leonardo L. Garcia		Ramon 'Bong' Revilla Jr., Eddie Garcia, Paquito Diaz, Melissa Mendez, Romy Diaz, Nick Romano, Anita Linda, Kring-Kring Gonzalez, Nello Nayo, Baldo Marro	Action	Buena Films International
Joaquin Burdado	Carlo J. Caparas		Ramon Revilla, Tanya Gomez, Janice Jurado, Deborah Sun, Paquito Diaz, Rocco Montalban, Elvis Gutierrez, Renato del Prado, Johnny Vicar, Danny Riel, Danny Labra	Fantasy action	Golden Lion Films
Jockey T'yan	Bert Mendoza	Mimi C. Bautista (supervising producer)	Herbert Bautista, Cris Villanueva, Ana Margarita, Beverly Vergel, Nikki Martel, Jigo Garcia, Tina Godinez, Precious Hipolito, Cathy Mora, Mike Castillo	Fantasy comedy	RNB Films
Kambal Na Kamao: Madugong Engkwentro	Carlo J. Caparas		Rolando Navarette, Rolando Bohol, Mia Pratts, Ana Abiera, Deborah Sun, Ruel Vernal, Rudy Meyer, Bomber Moran, Renato del Prado, Rocco Montalban	Sports	The Golden Lions Productions
Kambal Tuko	J. Erastheo Navoa		Susan Roces, Eddie Gutierrez, Richard and Raymond Gutierrez, Jenny Lyn, Isabel Granada, Fatima Alvir, Chuckie Dreyfuss, Raffy Romillo, Brylle Mondejar	Fantasy comedy	Regal Films
Kapag Napagod ang Puso	Maryo J. de los Reyes		Christopher de Leon, Snooky Serna, Gloria Romero, Lito Pimentel, Julio Diaz, Rez Cortez, Anjo Yllana, Caridad Sanchez	Romantic drama	VH Films
Knock Knock, Who's There?	Carlo J. Caparas		Joey de Leon, Richard Gutierrez, Raymond Gutierrez, Lyka Ugarte, Janice Jurado, Cheenee de Leon, Val Sotto, Jimmy Santos, Frieda Fonda, Spanky Rigor	Comedy	Golden Lions Films
Kumander Anting-Anting	Charlie Ordoñez	Charlie Ordoñez	Redford White, Melissa Mendez, Boy Alano, Tony Santos Jr., Rene Requiestas, Efren 'Turling' Pader, Rommel Valdez, Renato del Prado, Vic Valero, Jun de la Paz	Action comedy	Superior Films
Kumander Bawang: Kalaban ng Mga Aswang	Ramje		Herbert Bautista, Mat Ranillo III, Matet, Mia Prats, Timmy Cruz, Jigo Garcia, Jay Jay Salvador, Vina Morales, Joko Diaz, Ronald Jayme	Fantasy comedy	Viva Films
Kumander Dante	Ben Yalung	Christela Marie P. Yalung, Viveka C. Yalung	Phillip Salvador, Laarnie Enriquez, Paquito Diaz, Charlie Davao, Robert Talabis, Bing Davao, Bomber Moran, King Gutierrez, E.R. Ejercito, Ruben Rustia	Action	Viva Films
Lorenzo Ruiz: The Saint... A Filipino	Maria Saret		Mat Ranillo III, Charito Solis, Dang Cecilio, Juco Diaz, Rose Anne Gonzales, Alvin Enriquez, Rosanno Abelardo, Ed Gaerlan, Joe Fisher, Eyal Samanton	Religious, biopic	RJU Films International
Lost Command	Ben (M7) Yalung	Horace (M2) Yalung; Romy (M3) Yalung	Ramon 'Bong' Revilla Jr., Paquito Diaz, Lala Montelibano, Jenny Lyn, Dave Brodett, Baldo Marro, Robert Talabis, Lolit Solis, King Gutierrez, E. R. Ejercito	Action	Cine Suerte
Magkano ang Iyong Dangal?	Laurice Guillen		Christopher de Leon, Zsa Zsa Padilla, Joel Torre, Jestoni Alarcon, Princess Punzalan, Michael Locsin, Metring David	Romantic drama	Seiko Films
Misis Mo, Misis Ko	Carlos Siguion-Reyna	Armida Siguion-Reyna	Dina Bonnevie, Edu Manzano, Jackie Lou Blanco, Ricky Davao, Jacklyn Jose, Ali Sotto, Rez Cortez, Joji Isla	Romance	Viva Films
Nagbabagang Luha	Ishmael Bernal		Lorna Tolentino, Gabby Concepcion, Richard Gomez, Alice Dixson, Gloria Romero, Honey Mae Ledesma, Olivia Cenizal, Lilian Laing, Alma Lerma, Laura Hermosa	Romantic drama	Regal Films
Naglalarong Puso	Chito B. Tapawan		Tony Martinez, Cherrie Madrigal, Raoul Aragonn, Odette Khan, Luisa Laurel, Ronald Nepomuceno, Ryan Robles, Pamela Louise, Jose Romulo	Romantic drama	Fantasy Films International
Nakausap Ko ang Birhen	Mike Relon Makiling		Lotlot de Leon, Ramon Christopher, Snooky Serna, Eddie Garcia, Bella Flores, Marissa Delgado, Subas Herrero, Janice de Belen, Barbara Perez	Religious drama	Regal Films
Natutulog Pa ang Diyos	Lino Brocka		Lorna Tolentino, Gary Valenciano, Ricky Davao, Gina Pareño, Ricky Belmonte, Dante Rivero, Marita Zobel, Michael Locsin, Tina Godinez	Drama	Seiko Films
Ompong Galapong: May Ulo, Walang Tapon	Angel Labra		Dolphy, Redford White, Chat Silayan, Berting Labra, Rommel Valdez, Don Pepot, Ronel Victor, Ria Baron, Max Alvarado, Bomber Moran	Comedy	Horizon Films
One Day, Isang Araw	Pablo Santiago		Fernando Poe Jr., Matet de Leon, Dawn Zulueta, Dencio Padilla, Paquito Diaz, Bayani Casimiro, Odette Khan, Johnny Wilson, Balot, Malu de Guzman	Action comedy	Regal Films
One Two Bato, Three Four Bapor	Ben Feleo		Sheryl Cruz, Romnick Sarmenta, Eddie Garcia, Sylvia La Torre, Romy Diaz, Ian Veneracion, Harlene Bautista, Michael Locsin, Richard Gutierrez, Raymond Gutierrez	Comedy drama	Seiko Films
Patrolman	Cesar Abella		Baldo Marro, Melissa Mendez, Sunshine, Raoul Aragonn, Dick Israel, Zandro Zamora, Odette Khan	Action	El Niño Films
Pepeng Kuryente: Man with a Thousand Volts	Jose Yandóc	Azucena M. Bautista	Ramon Revilla, Ramon "Bong" Revilla Jr., Dante Rivero, Marissa Delgado, Ramon Zamora, Melissa Mendez, Gwen Avila, Alicia Alonzo, Cecille "Dabiana" Iñigo, George Estregan Jr.	Science fiction action	Imus Productions
Petrang Kabayo at ang Pilyang Kuting	Luciano B. Carlos		Roderick Paulate, Aiza Seguerra, Manilyn Reynes, Janno Gibbs, Cristina Paner, Cris Villanueva, Dely Atay Atayan, Cynthia Patag, Roy Alvarez, Tony Carreon	Fantasy comedy	Regal Films
Pik Pak Boom	Leroy Salvador	Ramon Salvador	Herbert Bautista, Lea Salonga, Lilet, Bing Loyzaga, Regine Velasquez, Dingdong Avanzado, Jay-Jay Salvador, Cathy Mora, Luz Valdez, Subas Herrero	Anthology, teen comedy	Viva Films
Puso sa Puso	Emmanuel H. Borlaza		Sheryl Cruz, Romnick Sarmenta, Helen Vela, Ricky Belmonte, Liza Lorena, Perla Bautista, Cesar Montano, Jaime Castillo, Jennifer Sevilla, Eddie Garcia	Romance	Seiko Films
Raider Platoon	Francis "Jhun" Posadas		Jess Lapid Jr., Philip Gamboa, Amanda Amores, Lezette Cordero, Ernie Ortega	Action	Ticar Films
Red Roses for a Call Girl	Bobby A. Suarez		Maria Isabel Lopez, Robert Marius, Arnold Mendoza, Julia Kent, Don Gordon Bell, Werner Pochath, Manfred Seipold, Nigel Hogge, Vangie Labalan, Vic Santos	Drama	BAS Film; Lisa Film (West Germany)
Rosa Mistica	Emmanuel H. Borlaza		Snooky Serna, Aga Muhlach, Kristine Garcia, Liza Lorena, Eric Quizon, Chanda Romero, Orestes Ojeda, Gabby Concepcion, Charito Solis, Rachel Anne Wolfe	Anthology, romantic fantasy	Regal Films
Sandakot Na Bala	Jose N. Carreon		Rudy Fernandez, Gloria Romero, Eddie Garcia, Nadia Montenegro, Monica Herrera, RR Herrera, Billy Joe Crawford, Melanie Marquez, Mario Escudero, Subas Herrero	Action drama	Regal Films
Sgt. Ernesto 'Boy' Ybañez: Tirtir Gang	Willy Milan		Sonny Parsons, Eddie Garcia, Vivian Foz, Charlie Davao, Romy Diaz, Lucita Soriano, Carol Dauden, Renato del Prado, Fernan Morato	Action	Double M Films International
Sgt. Victor Magno: Kumakasa Kahit Nag-iisa	Nilo Saez		Ronnie Ricketts, Nadia Montenegro, Roland Dantes, Robin Padilla, George Estregan Jr., Ruel Vernal, Philip Gamboa, Dick Israel, Val Iglesias, Ernie Forte	Action	Serres Films
Sheman: Mistress of the Universe	Tony Reyes		Joey de Leon, Panchito, Ruffa Gutierrez, Dennis Da Silva, Erik Cayetano, Mylene Gonzales, Paquito Diaz, Ruel Vernal, Timmy Cruz, Palito	Fantasy comedy	Viva Films
Smith & Wesson	Tony Y. Reyes	Vic Sotto, Joey de Leon	Vic Sotto, Joey de Leon, Beverly Vergel, Panchito, Paquito Diaz, Mon Alvir, Angela Luz, Jimmy Fabregas, Rene Requiestas	Action comedy	Viva Films
Stomach In, Chest Out	Junn P. Cabreira	Horace (M2) Yalung, Romy (M3) Yalung	Eddie Garcia, Joey Marquez, Lara Melissa de Leon, Mercy Dizon, Debraliz, Daphie Garcia, Beth Yalung, Dexter Doria, Monica Herrera, Janice Jurado	Comedy	Cine Suerte
Stupid Cupid	Maryo J. delos Reyes		Snooky Serna, Richard Gomez, Pops Fernandez, Martin Nievera, Manilyn Reynes, Janno Gibbs, Maricel Soriano, William Martinez, Lani Mercado, Nadia Montenegro	Anthology, romantic comedy	Regal Films
Sukdulan	Joe "Kaka" Balagtas		Myra Manibog, Olga Miranda, Franco Madrigal	Erotic horror	Double M Productions
Super Inday and the Golden Bibe	Luciano B. Carlos		Maricel Soriano, Aiza Seguerra, Eric Quizon, Manilyn Reynes, Janno Gibbs, Melanie Marquez, Nova Villa, Jimmy Santos, Mel Martinez, Michael Roberts	Fantasy comedy	Regal Films
Ang Supremo	Joey del Rosario	GP	Ramon Revilla, Chat Silayan, Eddie Garcia, Jean Saburit, Rommel Valdez, Miguel Rodriguez, Ulysses Santiago, Greg Moreno, Dennis Isla, Rocco Montalban	Action	GP Films
Taray at Teroy	Pablo Santiago		Maricel Soriano, Randy Santiago, Barbara Perez, Nova Villa, Jimmy Fabregas, Beverly Salviejo, Esther Chavez, Nadia Montenegro, Chito Alcid, Via Nueva	Romantic comedy	Regal Films
Target: Maganto	Leonardo L. Garcia	Greg V. Magliba	Ronnie Ricketts, Aurora Salve, Monica Herrera, Paquito Diaz, Romy Diaz, Nick Romano, Renato del Prado, Bing Davao, Charlie Davao	Biographical action	GVM Productions
Tiyanak	Peque Gallaga, Lorenzo A. Reyes	Jenny Luber	Janice de Belen, Lotlot de Leon, Ramon Christopher, Mary Walter, Chuckie Dreyfus, Carmina Villarroel, Rudolph Yaptinchay, Smokey Manaloto, Bella Flores, Betty Mae Piccio	Horror	Regal Films
Trident Force	Richard Smith		Anthony Alonzo, Nanna Anderson, Mark Gil, Steve Rogers, Eddie M. Gaerlan, Ronnie Patterson, Nick Nicholson, Willy Schober, Rafael Schulz, Tony Ogumsaya	Action	ANNA Films International
Tubusin Mo ng Dugo	Pepe Marcos		Rudy Fernandez, Eddie Garcia, Marianne Dela Riva, Johnny Delgado, Debbie Miller, Princess Punzalan, Perla Bautista, Roy Alvarez, Rez Cortez, Conrad Poe	Action	Bonanza Films
The Untouchable Family	Tony Y. Reyes		Redford White, Edgar Mortiz, Caridad Sanchez, Ronel Victor, Regine Velasquez, Lala Montelibano, Berting Labra, Cachupoy, 3 Itlog, Sabatini Fernandez	Action comedy	Falcon Films
Urban Terrorist	Dante Javier		Mark Gil, Ronnie Ricketts, Dick Israel, Dhouglas Veron, Juan Rodrigo, Kristel Romero, Tom Olivar, Charlie Davao, George Estregan Jr., Alex de Leon	Action	South Cotabato Films
Wake Up Little Susie	Luciano B. Carlos		Tito, Vic & Joey, Lotlot de Leon, Ramon Christopher, Cristina Paner, Cris Villanueva, Manilyn Reynes, Janno Gibbs, Aiza Seguerra	Comedy	Regal Films

== 1989 ==
Film	Director	Producer	Cast	Genre	Production company
1989
Starzan: Shouting Star of the Jungle	Tony Y. Reyes		Joey de Leon, Zsa Zsa Padilla, Panchito Alba, Tina Paner, Cris Villanueva, Cynthia Patag, Rene Requiestas, Rommel Valdez, Spanky Rigor, Don Pepot	Comedy	Regal Films
Walang Panginoon	Mauro Gia Samonte		Jestoni Alarcon, John Regala, Robert Arevalo, Michael Locsin, Harlene Bautista	Action	
Alex Boncayao Brigade	Joey del Rosario	Ricky Salonga	Ronnie Ricketts, Mia Prats, George Estregan Jr., Marco Polo, Richard Bonnin, Dave Brodett, Val Iglesias, Nick Romano, Bomber Moran, Dexter Doria	Action	Olympia Pictures
Mars Ravelo's Bondying: The Little Big Boy	Mike Relon Makiling		Jimmy Santos, Dawn Zulueta, Chichay, Panchito, Nova Villa, Paquito Diaz, Jigo Garcia, Geli de Belen	Comedy	Viva Films
Sgt. Niñonuevo: The Fastest Gun Alive of WPD	Ronnie San Juan		Sonny Parsons, Marianne dela Riva, Eddie Garcia, Bella Flores, Paquito Diaz, Raoul Aragonn, Rez Cortez, Max Alvarado, Romy Diaz, Larry Silva	Action	Kelly Ellis Films International
Pahiram ng Isang Umaga	Ishmael Bernal		Vilma Santos, Gabby Concepcion, Eric Quizon, Zsa Zsa Padilla	Romantic drama	Regal Films
Arrest: Pat. Rizal Alih – Zamboanga Massacre	Carlo J. Caparas		Ramon Revilla, Vilma Santos, Eddie Garcia, Marianne Dela Riva, Paquito Diaz, Raoul Aragonn, Baldo Marro, Charlie Davao, Rosemarie Gil, Dick Israel	Action	The Golden Lions Productions
Here Comes the Bride	Artemio Marquez		Susan Roces, Eddie Gutierrez, Pilar Pilapil, Aga Muhlach, Jean Garcia, Lotlot de Leon, Ramon Christopher	Drama, romance	Regal Films
Long Ranger and Tonton (Shooting Stars of the West)	Tony Y. Reyes		Joey de Leon, Rene Requiestas, Panchito, Maricel Laxa, Lorna Galvez, Jon Achaval, Vangie Labalan, Bing Angeles, Celeste Bueno, Joaquin Fajardo	Comedy	Regal Films
Tatak ng Isang Api	Augusto Salvador	Ramon Salvador	Ronnie Ricketts, Eddie Garcia, Efren Reyes Jr., Jaclyn Jose, Aurora Sevilla, Dencio Padilla, Jimmy Fabregas, Zandro Zamora, Rommel Valdez, Usman Hassim	Action	Omega Releasing Organization
Ang Pumatay Nang Dahil Sa'yo!	Wilfredo Milan	William C. Leary	Chuck Perez, Eddie Garcia, Vic Vargas, Michael De Mesa, Alexander Vargas, Lara Melissa De Leon, Cathy Mora, Isadora, Angela Luz, Perla Bautista	Action	Viva Films
Starzan 2: The Coming of Star Son	Tony Y. Reyes		Joey de Leon, Zsa Zsa Padilla, Rene Requiestas, Panchito, Noel "Ungga" Ayala, Myllet Padilla, Ruel Vernal, Bomber Moran, Vangie Labalan, Jon Achaval	Comedy	Mother Studio
Ako ang Huhusga	Ronwaldo Reyes		Fernando Poe Jr., Eddie Garcia, Monica Herrera, Paquito Diaz, Maila Gumila, Dencio Padilla, Philipp Gamboa, Mario Escudero, Vic Varrion, Ernie Zarate	Action	Bonanza Films
Sa Kuko ng Agila	Augusto Buenaventura	Raymond Tan	Joseph Estrada, Nikki Coseteng, Maria Isabel Lopez, Ruben Rustia, Tommy Abuel, Paquito Diaz, Laurice Guillen, Subas Herrero, Lara Melissa de Leon	Action	Richfilm
Aso't Pusa	J. Erastheo Navoa		Tito Sotto, Aiza Seguerra, Jimmy Santos, Rene Requiestas, Dante Rivero, Panchito, Gelli de Belen, Jigo Garcia, Kempee de Leon, Lilet	Comedy	Viva Films
Imortal	Eddie Garcia	William C. Leary	Vilma Santos, Christopher de Leon	Drama, mystery, thriller	Viva Films
Ipaglalaban Ko!	Manuel "Fyke" Cinco		Rudy Fernandez, Charito Solis, Gretchen Barretto, Rita Avila, Mark Gil, Michael De Mesa, Elvis Gutierrez, Dencio Padilla, Romy Diaz, Zandro Zamora	Action	Seiko Films
Hindi Pahuhuli Nang Buhay	Joey Del Rosario	William C. Leary	Robin Padilla, Dawn Zulueta, Johnny Delgado, Mark Gil, Val Iglesias, Eula Valdez, Hero Bautista	Action	Viva Films
Pulis, Pulis sa Ilalim ng Tulay	Mike Relon Makiling		Dolphy, Joey Marquez, Alice Dixson, Kristina Paner, Cris Villanueva, Joey Albert, Nova Villa, Panchito, Che-Che Sta. Ana, Palito	Comedy	Regal Films
Delima Gang	Pepe Marcos		Phillip Salvador, Marianne Dela Riva, Robin Padilla, Rey "PJ" Abellana, Efren Reyes Jr., Bobby Zhornack, Conrad Poe, Zandro Zamora, Raoul Aragonn, Atoy Co	Action	Bonanza Films
Bilangin ang Bituin sa Langit	Elwood Perez	Lily Monteverde	Nora Aunor, Tirso Cruz III	Drama, romance	Regal Films
Babayaran Mo ng Dugo	Jun Posadas		Jestoni Alarcon, Rita Avila, John Regala, Robert Arevalo, Michael de Mesa, Subas Herrero, Dick Israel, Maita Soriano, Jovit Moya, Rachel Lobangco	Action	Seiko Films
Wanted: Pamilya Banal	Pablo P. Santiago	FPJ	Fernando Poe Jr., Charo Santos, Armida Siguion-Reyna, Rosemarie Gil, Zandro Zamora, Dranreb Belleza, John Regala, Cristina Gonzales, Ann Kimper, Paquito Diaz	Action	FPJ Productions
Gawa Na ang Bala para sa Akin	Efren M. Jarlego		Vic Sotto, Monica Herrera, Panchito, Nova Villa, Paquito Diaz, Ruel Vernal, Larry Silva, Rene Requiestas, Noel Ong, Harvey Vizcarra	Comedy	Regal Films
Jones Bridge Massacre (Task Force Clabio)	Ben "M7" Yalung	Horace G. Yalung, Roman G. Yalung, Ricardo Q. Yalung	Lito Lapid, Jackie Aquino, Eddie Garcia, Paquito Diaz, Berting Labra, Ruel Vernal, Robert Talabis, Rez Cortez, King Gutierrez, Edwin Reyes	Crime action	Cine Suerte
Boy Kristiano	Cesar Abella		John Regala, Bernard Bautista, Darwin Cruz	Action	El Niño Films
Carnap King? (The Randy Padilla Story)	Deo J. Fajardo		Robin Padilla, Maita Soriano, Jobelle Salvador, Leni Santos, Rina Reyes, Perla Bautista, Charlie Davao, R.R. Herrera, Toby Alejar, Bing Davao	Action	Double M Productions
First Lessons	Leroy Salvador	Robbie Tan	Gretchen Barretto, Romnick Sarmenta, Gina Pareño, Joel Torre, Jennifer Sevilla, Jojo Alejar, Janet Arnaiz	Romance	Red Horse Films
Regal Shocker (The Movie)	Jose Javier Reyes		Ruffa Gutierrez, Carmina Villarroel, Ana Roces, Isabel Granada	Horror	Regal Films
Sa Diyos Lang Akong Susuko	Manuel "Fyke" Cinco	William Leary	Robin Padilla, Amy Perez, Nanette Medved, Leah Orosa, Roi Vinzon, Subas Herrero, Jimmy Fabregas, Marco Polo Garcia, Perla Bautista, Dick Israel	Action	Viva Films
Isang Bala, Isang Buhay	Jose N. Carreon	Jesse Ejercito	Ramon "Bong" Revilla Jr., Tony Ferrer, Dawn Zulueta, Suzanne Gonzales, Rosemarie Gil, Paquito Diaz, Ruben Rustia, Subas Herrero, Dencio Padilla, Ilonnah Jean	Action	Viva Films
Nazareno Apostol: Boy Ahas	Jerry O. Tirazona	CTB 999	Sonny Parsons, Charlie Davao, Nick Romano, Marithez Samson, Dick Israel, Leo Lazaro, Robert Talby, Robert Miller, Rey Sagum, Joe Baltazar	Action	Super 9 Films International
Boots Oyson: Sa Katawan Mo, Aagos ang Dugo			Lito Lapid, Vic Vargas, Maria Isabel Lopez, Lito Legaspi, Marco Polo Garcia, Myrna Castillo, Jun Santiago, Greg Moreno, Ross Rival	Action	Horizon Films
Ang Bukas ay Akin, Langit ang Uusig	Laurice Guillen	Robbie Tan	Gretchen Barretto, Jestoni Alarcon, Cherie Gil, Cesar Montano, Isabel Rivas	Romance	Seiko Films
