= 1988 Metro Manila Film Festival =

Film festival edition

- Date: December 25, 1988 to January 3, 1989
- Site: Manila

Highlights
- Best Picture: Patrolman
- Most awards: Celestina Sanchez, Alyas Bubbles/ Enforcer: Ativan Gang (5)

The 14th Metro Manila Film Festival was held in 1988.

An unheralded and obscure movie, Patrolman was named the Best Picture in the 1988 Metro Manila Film Festival. The lead star, once unknown stuntman-actor Baldo Marro won the Best Actor award for his role as a dedicated policeman edging out the favored Christopher de Leon. Amy Austria won the Best Actress award for her convincing performance of a woman who led a life of crime in Bubbles: Ativan Gang. Other awardees include Best Director for Laurice Guillen, Best Supporting Actor for Dick Israel and Best Supporting Actress for Jaclyn Jose among others.

FPJ Productions' Agila ng Maynila was the festival's top grosser, with all six entries grossing ₱49.5 million in total.

== Entries ==
Title	Starring	Studio	Director	Genre
Agila ng Maynila	Fernando Poe, Jr., Vic Vargas, R.R. Herrera, Paquito Diaz, Charlie Davao, Raoul Aragon	FPJ Productions	Pablo Santiago	Action
Celestina Sanchez, a.k.a. Bubbles – Enforcer: Ativan Gang	Amy Austria, Miguel Rodriguez, Jaclyn Jose, Isadora, Lola Rodriguez, Gina Pareño	Golden Lion Films	Carlo J. Caparas	Action drama
Itanong Mo sa Buwan	Mark Gil, Anjo Yllana, Jaclyn Jose	Double M Films	Chito Roño	Crime drama, thriller
Magkano ang Iyong Dangal?	Christopher de Leon, Zsa Zsa Padilla, Joel Torre, Jestoni Alarcon, Princess Punzalan, Michael Locsin	Seiko Films	Laurice Guillen	Romantic drama
Patrolman	Baldo Marro, Melissa Mendez, Sunshine, Raoul Aragonn, Dick Israel, Zandro Zamora	El Niño Films	Cesar SB. Abella	Action drama
Pik Pak Boom	Herbert Bautista, Lea Salonga, Bing Loyzaga, Regine Velasquez, Lilet, Jay-Jay Salvador, Dingdong Avanzado	VIVA Films	Leroy Salvador	Anthology comedy

== Winners and nominees ==
=== Awards ===
Winners are listed first and highlighted in boldface.

Best Film	Best Director
**Patrolman**; Magkano ang Iyong Dangal? (2nd Best Picture); Celestina Sanchez, a.k.a. Bubbles – Enforcer: Ativan Gang (3rd Best Picture)	**Laurice Guillen – Magkano ang Iyong Dangal?**
Best Actor	Best Actress
**Baldo Marro – Patrolman**; Christopher de Leon – Magkano ang Iyong Dangal?	**Amy Austria – Celestina Sanchez, a.k.a. Bubbles – Enforcer: Ativan Gang**
Best Supporting Actor	Best Supporting Actress
**Dick Israel – Patrolman**	**Jaclyn Jose – Celestina Sanchez, a.k.a. Bubbles – Enforcer: Ativan Gang**; Princess Punzalan – Magkano ang Iyong Dangal?
Best Art Direction	Best Cinematography
**Manny B. Morfe – Pik Pak Boom**	**Romeo Vitug – Magkano ang Iyong Dangal?**
Best Sound Engineering	Best Musical Score
**Ramon Reyes – Itanong Mo sa Buwan**	**Willy Cruz – Magkano ang Iyong Dangal?**
Best Child Performer	Best Editing
**R.R. Herrera – Agila ng Maynila**	**Ike Jarlego Jr. – Magkano ang Iyong Dangal?**
Best Story	Best Screenplay
**Carlo J. Caparas and Tony Mortel – Celestina Sanchez, a.k.a. Bubbles – Enforcer: Ativan Gang**	**Carlo J. Caparas and Tony Mortel – Celestina Sanchez, a.k.a. Bubbles – Enforcer: Ativan Gang**

== Multiple awards ==
Awards	Film
5	Celestina Sanchez, a.k.a. Bubbles – Enforcer: Ativan Gang
4	Magkano ang Iyong Dangal?
3	Patrolman

== Ceremony information ==
=== "Best Director" controversy ===
During the award-giving ceremony, stuntman and character actor-turned-filmmaker Baldo Marro won the Best Actor for Patrolman film, which also won him the Best Director award. In fact, he was not known before this. He bested prizewinning director Chito Roño of Itanong Mo sa Buwan in the division, sending uproar from well-meaning critics and regular local film observers. Nevertheless, the announced Best Director award goes to Laurice Guillen.

Preceded by 1987 Metro Manila Film Festival	Metro Manila Film Festival; 1988	Succeeded by 1989 Metro Manila Film Festival
