= Magkano ang Iyong Dangal? =

1988 drama film by Laurice Guillen

- Official movie poster
- Directed by: Laurice Guillen
- Written by: Jose N. Carreon; Joen Chionglo
- Based on: Magkano ang Iyong Dangal? by Gilda Olvidado
- Produced by: Robbie Tan
- Starring: Christopher de Leon; Zsa Zsa Padilla; Joel Torre; Jestoni Alarcon; Princess Punzalan; Michael Locsin
- Cinematography: Romy Vitug
- Edited by: Ike Jarlego Jr.
- Music by: Willy Cruz
- Production company: Seiko Films
- Release date: December 25, 1988
- Country: Philippines
- Language: Filipino

Magkano ang Iyong Dangal? (lit. 'How Much Is Your Dignity?') is a 1988 Filipino romantic drama film directed by Laurice Guillen and starring Christopher de Leon, Zsa Zsa Padilla, Joel Torre, Jestoni Alarcon, Princess Punzalan, and Michael Locsin. Adapted from the "komik" of the same name by Gilda Olvidado, the film is about the adulteries committed by married couple Paolo and Era, played by de Leon and Padilla respectively. It was released on December 25, 1988, as part of the 14th Metro Manila Film Festival (MMFF).

Magkano ang Iyong Dangal? won five MMFF awards, for Second Best Picture, Best Director (Guillen), Best Music (Willy Cruz), Best Cinematography (Romeo Vitug), and Best Editing (Ike Jarlego Jr.). Though de Leon's performance in the film was praised by many, including critic Lav Diaz, he lost the award for Best Actor to Baldo Marro in Patrolman.

== Cast ==
- Christopher de Leon as Paolo
- Zsa Zsa Padilla as Era
- Joel Torre as Larry
- Jestoni Alarcon
- Princess Punzalan as Alma
- Michael Locsin
- Metring David

== Release ==
Magkano ang Iyong Dangal? was given a "P-13" rating by the Movie and Television Review and Classification Board (MTRCB), and was released on December 25, 1988, as part of the 14th Metro Manila Film Festival (MMFF).

== Reception ==
=== Box office ===
On its opening day, Magkano ang Iyong Dangal? grossed ₱1.9 million, the third highest among MMFF films. By January, the film would retain its standing as the third highest-grossing film among the six entries of the 14th MMFF, after Agila ng Maynila and Pik Pak Boom.

=== Critical response ===
Lav Diaz, writing for the Manila Standard, praised the "explosive" drama of the film, which he likened to Fatal Attraction. Meg Mendoza, also of the Manila Standard, gave a negative review of the film, faulting Zsa Zsa Padilla and Jestoni Alarcon's performances as "contrived" and "boring" respectively, and expressing disappointment overall due to her high expectations for the talents involved such as director Laurice Guillen.

Christopher de Leon's performance received critical acclaim. Diaz gave high praise to de Leon's acting, stating that "it almost reaches the point that whenever people watch a film [de Leon] is featured in, he is now the one being watched instead of the film." Though Mendoza disparaged the film, she praised de Leon's "inspired" performance. Letty Jimenez of the Philippine Daily Inquirer also gave praise to de Leon's acting, stating that "[f]or purely artistic merit, de Leon deserved [the MMFF Best Actor award]." Actress Armida Siguion-Reyna expressed the sentiment that both de Leon and Mark Gil, the latter from Itanong Mo sa Buwan, were more deserving of the MMFF Best Actor award than the actual winner Baldo Marro from Patrolman.

=== Accolades ===
Group	Category	Name	Result
Metro Manila Film Festival	Second Best Picture	Magkano ang Iyong Dangal?	Won
Metro Manila Film Festival	Best Director	Laurice Guillen	Won
Metro Manila Film Festival	Best Actor	Christopher de Leon	Nominated
Metro Manila Film Festival	Best Supporting Actress	Princess Punzalan	Nominated
Metro Manila Film Festival	Best Musical Score	Willy Cruz	Won
Metro Manila Film Festival	Best Cinematography	Romeo Vitug	Won
Metro Manila Film Festival	Best Editing	Ike Jarlego Jr.	Won
FAMAS Awards	Best Picture	Magkano ang Iyong Dangal?	Nominated
FAMAS Awards	Best Director	Laurice Guillen	Nominated
FAMAS Awards	Best Supporting Actor	Joel Torre	Nominated
PMPC Star Awards for Movies	Best Supporting Actor	Joel Torre	Nominated

== Television remake ==
Magkano ang Iyong Dangal? was remade into a television series on ABS-CBN directed by Chito S. Roño in 2010. Coincidentally, Roño was previously the director of the competing 1988 MMFF entry Itanong Mo sa Buwan.
