= Kapag Langit ang Humatol =

1990 Filipino revenge drama film by Laurice Guillen

- Restored version poster in 2014, designed by Justin Besana
- Directed by: Laurice Guillen
- Screenplay by: Salvador M. Royales; Emmanuel H. Borlaza
- Story by: Salvador M. Royales
- Produced by: Charo Santos-Concio; Malou N. Santos
- Starring: Vilma Santos; Richard Gomez; Gloria Romero; Carmina Villarroel; Jeffrey Santos
- Cinematography: Romy Vitug
- Edited by: Efren Jarlego Jr.
- Music by: Nonong Buencamino
- Production company: Vision Films
- Distributed by: Vision Films (Note: Vision Films was a predecessor of the current Star Cinema.)
- Release date: October 11, 1990
- Running time: 125 minutes
- Country: Philippines
- Language: Filipino

Kapag Langit ang Humatol (English: Judgement from Heaven or When Heaven Judges) is a 1990 Filipino revenge drama film directed by Laurice Guillen. The film follows Florida (Vilma Santos), an ambitious house helper who wishes to become a successful person, but her life becomes miserable when she is humiliated, abused, and maltreated by Octavia (Gloria Romero), her evil employer. By the time she successfully achieved her dreams, she began to take revenge on her. It co-stars Richard Gomez, Carmina Villarroel, and Jeffrey Santos.

Salvador M. Royales wrote a radio drama story that was serialized for DZRH, which he adapted into a screenplay with Emmanuel "Maning" Borlaza. It is the first film directed by Guillen that is adapted from a radio drama. The film's theme song, performed by Dulce, was written by Amado Lacuesta Jr. and composed by Nonong Buencamino.

Produced and distributed by Vision Film Exponents, the film was theatrically released on October 11, 1990, to box-office success and received acclaim from critics and accolades from various award-giving bodies. In 2014, the film was digitally restored and remastered by the cooperation of ABS-CBN Film Restoration and Central Digital Lab.

== Plot ==
Florida, a servant at the Villarroel mansion, falls in love with Hector, the son of Doña Octavia, despite his marriage to Carol. During the couple's wedding reception, Florida suffers nausea and reveals her pregnancy to a colleague. Overhearing this, Octavia and her servants, Ariel and Nelia, lock Florida inside her quarters while Hector does nothing.

One day, a pregnant Carol falls on the stairs and gives birth to a stillborn child. At the same time, Florida gives birth while Hector is debilitated following a car crash engineered by disgruntled workers from Carol's estate. Octavia and her servants switch Carol's child with that of Florida, who is devastated when she assumes that her child is dead. Carol names the child Bernadette. Octavia then instructs Ariel to manipulate Hector into thinking that Florida is unfaithful to him by luring Florida for a drink and flirting with her in front of Hector, prompting the latter to expel Florida.

Florida takes a job as a seamstress at a garment factory, where she perseveres and becomes the confidante of her boss, Dorina. Dorina later divulges to Florida that she is dying of cancer and divides her company's shares between her son Oliver and Florida, now designated as Oliver's guardian. At the mansion, Carol begins an affair with Ariel, which Nelia finds jealousy-inducing. During an argument, Octavia reveals the truth about her child to Carol, prompting her to flee with Ariel. Octavia manipulates Nelia into fatally shooting Carol and Ariel before turning the gun on herself.

Eleven years later, Florida is now a successful businesswoman and buys the Villarroel mansion after Octavia squanders her fortune on gambling, although the Villarroels, who move to smaller accommodations, are unaware of this. Bernadette, now a teenager, meets Oliver, whom Florida raises as her child. Oliver joins Florida's quest for revenge on the Villarroels by feigning romantic feelings for Bernadette, but hides his connection with Florida from Octavia, who opposes their relationship, prompting Bernadette to rebel against her. Oliver later develops real feelings for Bernadette, but is reprimanded by Florida. Octavia discovers that Bernadette is pregnant with Oliver's child, but Bernadette runs away when Octavia chastises her. Bernadette is taken in by Oliver at the mansion, but is tormented by Florida, unaware that she is her biological child. As Bernadette and Oliver grow closer, Florida expels Bernadette, who returns to Octavia's place.

Octavia goes to the mansion to speak with Oliver's "aunt", but is shocked to see Florida, who throws wine at her. Disgusted, Octavia storms out while Florida gloats. The next day, Oliver announces his intent to marry Bernadette, sparking a confrontation with Florida, but gaining the tacit approval of Octavia. On their wedding day, Florida sabotages the event by knocking Oliver unconscious with spiked champagne before going to church to falsely claim that Oliver had called off the wedding to avoid being connected with the Villarroels. As Florida gloats at having her revenge, Octavia reveals that Bernadette is her daughter and divulges the truth behind what happened. A confused Bernadette runs off, while Florida returns to the mansion. Hector tries to reason with Florida, who points a gun at him. Realizing the truth after Hector bravely insists that Bernadette is her child, Florida breaks down in tears as Hector apologizes and expresses his continuing love for her, sustained by Bernadette's existence.

Bernadette attempts suicide and is hospitalized. Octavia phones a now-awake Oliver, who informs Hector and Florida. At a chapel, Florida prays for forgiveness of her sins and reconciles with a chastened Octavia. As Bernadette recovers, Florida seeks forgiveness for her treatment of her, adding that she was always in her thoughts as she recovered from her ordeal at the hands of the Villarroels. Bernadette eventually accepts Florida as her mother, while Florida and Hector rekindle their relationship.

== Cast ==
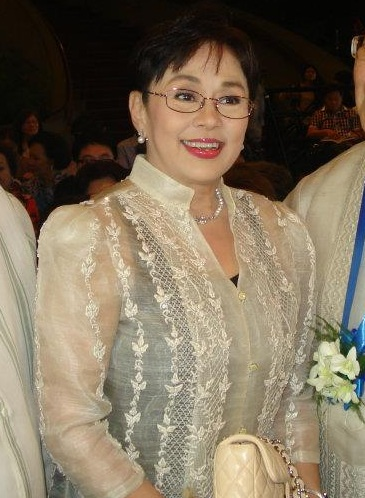
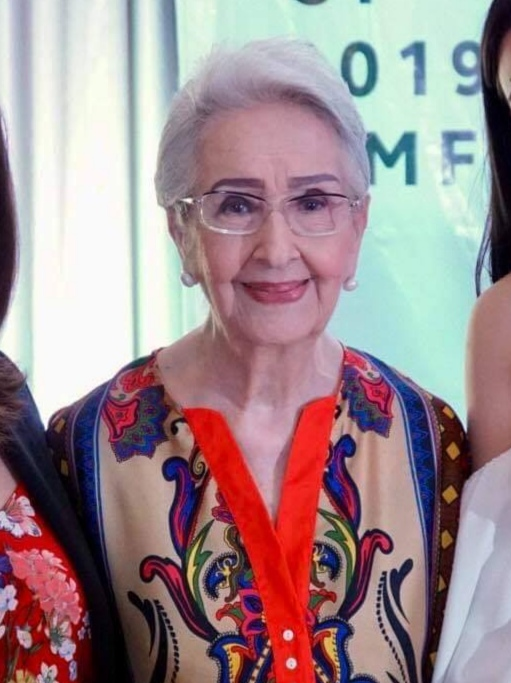
Vilma Santos (pictured in 2012) and Gloria Romero (pictured in 2019) respectively played the house helper and the evil employer.
- Vilma Santos as Florida Blanca, a house helper who later becomes a successful woman and wants to take revenge against Octavia.
- Richard Gomez as Hector, the son of Octavia, who is Florida's lover.
- Gloria Romero as Octavia, the evil matriarch who gave Florida a miserable life.
- Carmina Villarroel as Bernadette, the daughter of Florida and Hector.
  - Shiela Lyn Diamse as young Bernadette
- Jeffrey Santos as Oliver, the son of Dorina, who, after his mother's death, was placed under Florida's guardianship.
  - Terence Baylon as young Oliver
- Charo Santos-Concio as Dorina, Florida's employer-later-business partner, and Oliver's mother.
- Kristine Garcia as Carol, Hector's wife.
- William Lorenzo as Ariel, the evil servant
- Eula Valdez as Nelia, the other evil servant
- Metring David as Aling Tindeng, one of the estate's house helpers and one of the people who support Florida
- Lilian Laing and Bessie Barredo as mahjong players

== Production ==
=== Casting ===
The role of Hector was originally offered to Tirso Cruz III but Richard Gomez replaced him because some movie bookers were against the team-up between Tirso and Vilma, citing that he has no potential to make the film a box office hit.

Film producer Charo Santos-Concio offered two projects to actor Julio Diaz for Vision Films: one for Kapag Langit ang Humatol and one for the Ronnie Ricketts starrer Ganti ng Api (then unnamed and upcoming when Diaz was offered the roles). The actor turned down both offers because he was given assignments from his home studio, Viva Films. Diaz, however, later accepted her offer to star in Kailan Ka Magiging Akin the following year.

Director Laurice Guillen previously collaborated with actress Gloria Romero in her first film as director, Kasal? in 1980, and cast her as the evil and abusive Octavia Villarroel. She would later collaborate with Romero in the following films, including the 2000 family drama film Tanging Yaman.

== Digital restoration ==
The film was digitally restored and remastered in 2014 by ABS-CBN Film Restoration, in association with the local post-production company Central Digital Lab. According to the project head Leo Katigbak, the team encountered various defects in the film's prints including scratches, the same defects that were found during the restoration of the 1985 film Hindi Nahahati ang Langit (the film where Romero was part of the cast) and they worked for more than 1,000 manual hours for restoration of the frames and 100 hours for color grading. The restored version was released on December 10, 2014, in a limited number of theaters.

The restored version received a free-to-air television premiere on August 12, 2018, via Sunday's Best, ABS-CBN's Sunday late-night presentation block.

== Reception ==
=== Accolades ===
Year	Award-Giving Body	Category	Recipient	Result
1991	Gawad Urian Awards	Best Picture	Kapag Langit ang Humatol	Nominated
1991	Gawad Urian Awards	Best Direction	Laurice Guillen	Won
1991	Gawad Urian Awards	Best Actress	Vilma Santos	Nominated
1991	Gawad Urian Awards	Best Supporting Actress	Kristine Garcia	Nominated
1991	Gawad Urian Awards	Best Supporting Actress	Carmina Villarroel	Nominated
1991	Gawad Urian Awards	Best Screenplay	Emmanuel H. Borlaza and Salvador M. Royales	Nominated
1991	Gawad Urian Awards	Best Cinematography	Romy Vitug	Won
1991	Gawad Urian Awards	Best Production Design	Edgar Martin Littaua	Nominated
1991	Gawad Urian Awards	Best Editing	Efren Jarlego Jr.	Won
1991	FAP Awards	Best Story Adaptation	Emmanuel H. Borlaza and Salvador M. Royales	Won
1991	FAP Awards	Best Cinematography	Romy Vitug	Won
