= Akyat Bahay Gang =

1988 Filipino film starring Lito Lapid

- Directed by: Efren C. Piñon
- Screenplay by: Diego Cagahastian; Rene Villanueva
- Story by: Sonny Valencia
- Starring: Lito Lapid; Zandro Zamora; Dick Israel; Lito Gruet; Chuck Perez
- Cinematography: Charlie Peralta
- Edited by: Ruben Natividad
- Music by: Boy Alcaide
- Production company: Falcon Films
- Release date: April 20, 1988
- Country: Philippines
- Language: Filipino

Akyat Bahay Gang (transl. House Climbing Gang) is a 1988 Filipino crime film directed by Efren C. Piñon and starring Lito Lapid, Zandro Zamora, Dick Israel, Lito Gruet, Chuck Perez, Jean Saburit, Angela Perez, and Paquito Diaz. Produced by Falcon Films, a subsidiary of Viva Films, it was released on April 20, 1988. Critic Luciano E. Soriano gave the film a negative review, criticizing its lack of suspense and unexciting action, though he noted it was better than other films showing in theaters at the time.

== Cast ==
- Lito Lapid as Ricardo "Carding" Dacanay
- Zandro Zamora as Rufing
- Dick Israel as Ato
- Lito Gruet as Berto
- Chuck Perez as Mio
- Jean Saburit as Marianne
- Angela Perez as Liza
- Paquito Diaz as Abet Valdez
- Crystal Piñon as Daisy
- Peck Piñon as Mr. Allan Ang
- Perry Baltazar as Morrick
- Alex Bolado as Ely Valdez
- Sonny Valencia as Bong Valdez
- Rudy Meyer as Ramon Escudero
- Eric Francisco as Rodel Dacanay
- Rusty Santos as Capt. Panopio
- Joey Padilla as Pat. Reyes
- Leo Padilla as Lt. Nicolas
- Vic Belaro as Policeman No. 1
- Polly Cadsawan as Policeman No. 2
- Efren Lapid as Policeman No. 3
- Rey Lapid as Policeman No. 4
- Boy Salvador as Policeman No. 5

== Production ==
Akyat Bahay Gang was the last film Angela Perez starred in before retiring from the film industry to raise a family.

== Release ==
Akyat Bahay Gang was graded "B" by the Movie and Television Review and Classification Board (MTRCB), indicating a "good" quality. The film was released on April 20, 1988.

=== Critical response ===
Luciano E. Soriano, writing for the Manila Standard, gave the film a negative review, criticizing the heist scenes for lacking in suspense and the action for being unexciting, along with some inconsistencies in logic for character actions. However, Soriano considers Akyat Bahay Gang to be better than Urban Terrorist and Gorio Punasan, Rebel Driver which opened around the same time.
