= Gawa Na ang Bala Na Papatay sa Iyo =

1988 Filipino film starring Fernando Poe Jr.

- Directed by: Willy Milan
- Written by: Pablo S. Gomez
- Starring: Fernando Poe Jr.
- Cinematography: Ver Reyes
- Edited by: Augusto Salvador
- Music by: Jimmy Fabregas
- Production company: Lea Productions
- Distributed by: Lea Productions
- Release date: November 30, 1988
- Running time: 110 minutes
- Country: Philippines
- Language: Filipino

Gawa Na ang Bala Na Papatay sa Iyo (lit. 'The Bullet That Will Kill You Has Been Made') is a 1988 Philippine action film directed by Willy Milan from the story and script by Pablo S. Gomez. The film stars Fernando Poe Jr., Vic Vargas, Marianne Dela Riva, Subas Herrero, and Harlene Bautista. Produced by Lea Productions, the film was released on November 30, 1988.

Critic Lav Diaz noted its intense violence in comparison with Poe's previous films, and gave it a mixed review. Bautista won the Film Academy of the Philippines Award for Best Supporting Actress.

== Cast ==
- Fernando Poe Jr. as David Villafuerte
- Vic Vargas as Berto
- Marianne Dela Riva as Ester
- Subas Herrero as Don Rico Montefalcon
- Harlene Bautista as Lisa
- Rosemarie Gil as Doña Carmela
- Paquito Diaz as Alex
- Berting Labra as Turo
- Johnny Vicar as Viston
- Mario Escudero as Andres
- Toytoy Velayo
- Alma Lerma
- Vic Varrion
- Aida Pedido as Aling Mering

== Production ==
The film was originally titled Hindi Pa Nagagawa ang Bala para sa Akin (lit. 'The Bullet for Me Is Not Yet Made').

== Release ==
Gawa Na ang Bala was graded "A" by the Movie and Television Review and Classification Board (MTRCB), indicating a "Very Good" quality. The film was released on November 30, 1988. According to Meg Mendoza of the Manila Standard, there were long lines of patrons for the film outside Cubao theaters, stating that "[i]n one of the theaters, the moviegoers occupied the whole lobby and spilled over to the nearest bank down to the sidewalks."

=== Critical response ===
Lav Diaz, writing for the Manila Standard, observed that the film was more violent than actor Fernando Poe's previous films, seeming to follow the trend of ultra-violent action from western movies such as the Rambo franchise, though it still follows the revenge story formula found in Poe's other works. Overall, he gave a mixed review, commending the execution of action sequences and Poe's performance while criticizing the "gangland" portrayal of combat and the stale writing for Subas Herrero and Paquito Diaz's characters.

== Accolades ==
Group	Category	Name	Result
1989 FAP Awards	Best Supporting Actress	Harlene Bautista	Won
