= Isang Bala, Isang Buhay =

1989 action film by Jose N. Carreon

- Directed by: Jose N. Carreon
- Written by: Jose Carreon; Jojo M. Lapus
- Produced by: Jesse Ejercito
- Starring: Ramon 'Bong' Revilla Jr.; Dawn Zulueta
- Cinematography: Ely Cruz
- Edited by: Edgardo Vinarao
- Music by: Jaime Fabregas
- Production company: Viva Films
- Distributed by: Viva Films
- Release date: November 2, 1989
- Country: Philippines
- Language: Filipino

Isang Bala, Isang Buhay (lit. 'One Bullet, One Life') is a 1989 Filipino action film co-written and directed by Jose N. Carreon. The film stars Ramon "Bong" Revilla Jr., Tony Ferrer, Dawn Zulueta, Suzanne Gonzales, Rosemarie Gil, Paquito Diaz, Ruben Rustia, Subas Herrero, Dencio Padilla, and Ilonnah Jean. Produced by Viva Films, the film was released on November 2, 1989.

Critic Justino Dormiendo of the National Midweek gave the film a negative review, criticizing its cliché plot that fictionalizes the real story it is based on.

== Cast ==
- Ramon "Bong" Revilla Jr. as Daniel Zarragoza
- Dawn Zulueta as Dolores
- Tony Ferrer as Roman
- Suzanne Gonzales as Celis
- Rosemarie Gil as Dolores' Mother
- Romeo Rivera as Dolores' Father
- Paquito Diaz as Rigor
- Ruben Rustia as Don Honorio
- Subas Herrero as Mr. Abad
- Dencio Padilla as Mang Doming
- Ilonnah Jean as Maita
- George Estregan Jr. as ex-commando
- Rez Cortez as Ex-Commando
- Robert Talabis as Capt. Omar
- Bing Davao as Ex-Commando
- Mon Godiz as Ex-Commando
- Edwin Reyes as Ex-Commando
- Roldan Aquino as Lt. Roldan
- RR Herrera as Monching
- Rudy Meyer as Barbie
- Mario Escudero as Mr. Zulueta
- Arthur Santamaria as Arvee

== Production ==
Isang Bala, Isang Buhay is actress Ilonah Jean's first film for Viva Films.

== Release ==
Isang Bala, Isang Buhay was released in theaters on November 2, 1989.

=== Critical response ===
Justino Dormiendo, writing for the National Midweek, gave the film a negative review. He criticized the film's tired plot of "gold-hearted goons forced to embrace a life of crime and mayhem" which fictionalizes the true story from which it is based, and noted that Daniel's principle of using only one bullet for every opponent makes the film absurd "as soon as Revilla guns down his second victim." He also considered the actor's performances to be "barely passable." Overall, Dormiendo expressed disappointment in the film due to director Carreon previously demonstrating his filmmaking skills through his "brilliantly-scripted" Broken Marriage (1983) and "impressive directorial debut" Sandakot Na Bala (1988).
