= One Two Bato, Three Four Bapor =

1988 comedy film starring Sheryl Cruz, Romnick Sarmenta

- Official movie poster
- Directed by: Ben Feleo
- Written by: Jake Cocadiz; Ben Feleo
- Starring: Sheryl Cruz; Romnick Sarmenta; Eddie Garcia; Sylvia La Torre; Harlene Bautista; Michael Locsin; Ian Veneracion; Mon Alvir; Richard Gutierrez; Raymond Gutierrez
- Cinematography: J.R. Peterman
- Edited by: Renato de Leon
- Music by: Boy Alcaide
- Production company: Seiko Films
- Release date: December 14, 1988
- Country: Philippines
- Language: Filipino

One Two Bato, Three Four Bapor (lit. 'One Two Rock, Three Four Ship') is a 1988 Filipino comedy-drama film co-written and directed by Ben Feleo and starring Sheryl Cruz, Romnick Sarmenta, Eddie Garcia, Sylvia La Torre, Romy Diaz, Ian Veneracion, Harlene Bautista, Michael Locsin, and child actors Richard Gutierrez, and Raymond Gutierrez. Produced by Seiko Films, it was released on December 14, 1988. Critic Lav Diaz gave the film a mixed review, commending its honest focus on street children in the Philippines, while criticizing its commercial tendencies and implausible situations.

== Cast ==
=== Main cast ===
- Sheryl Cruz
- Romnick Sarmenta
- Eddie Garcia
- Sylvia La Torre as Julie
- Romy Diaz
- Ian Veneracion
- Harlene Bautista
- Michael Locsin
- Richard Gutierrez as Richie
- Raymond Gutierrez as Amboy
- Mon Alvir

=== Supporting cast ===
- Bomber Moran
- Metring David
- Matutina
- Fred Moro
- Whitney Tyson
- Dinky Doo Jr.
- Ros Olgado
- Ike Lozada
- Don Pepot
- Fatima Alvir
- Caselyn Francisco
- Patrick Cruz
- Reggie Javier
- Apple de Guzman
- Guio Alvarez
- Guila Alvarez
- Maricar Itable
- Emil Martin
- Abba Revilla
- Arjay Larvan
- Cante Castro

== Release ==
One Two Bato was rated "B" by the Movie and Television Review and Classification Board (MTRCB), indicating a "Good" quality. The film was released by Seiko Films on December 14, 1988, with free Seiko Wallets handed out to early first-day viewers.

=== Critical response ===
Lav Diaz, writing for the Manila Standard, gave the film a mixed review; though he commended the film's truthful focus on street children in the Philippines, he criticized it as leaning excessively into commercialism and fantastical situations. Giving examples, Diaz was displeased with a scene involving the child actors doing a Hawaiian dance, which he noted was well liked by audiences ("you understood why there are so many crazy people in our midst"), and he questioned how the separated twin brothers in the film were able to convincingly switch places and fool their families when they were only five years old.

== See also ==
- The Prince and the Pauper
