= Metring David =

Filipino actress and comedian (1920-2010

- Born: Demetria David; June 20, 1920
- Died: July 10, 2010 (aged 90); Manila, Philippines
- Resting place: Manila North Cemetery
- Occupation: Actress•Comedian

Demetria "Metring" David (June 20, 1920 – October 7, 2010) was a Filipino actress and comedian. She's famous for her "big feet" as she was called by her colleagues.

== Early life and later career ==
Born in 1920, she first appeared as a comedian in the dramas Malapit sa Diyos (Near to God), and Walang Hanggan, both under Lebran Pictures. In that same year she was included in the comedy film entitled Babaing Kalbo starring Eleanor Medina. She made films for other companies including LVN Pictures, Galawgaw, a Nida Blanca movie, Fremel Pictures and a small role in Sapagka't Mahal Kita (Because, I Love You) to name a few. In the years that followed, Metring David rose to popularity as a comedian in the 1960s a decade in which she made some three dozen films and many television appearances.

== Return to television ==
Meltring's last TV appearance was Wish Ko Lang! on GMA Channel 7.

== Death ==
She died on October 7, 2010, in Manila, Philippines.

== Selected filmography ==
=== Film ===
- 1953 - Malapit sa Diyos
- 1953 - Walang Hanggan
- 1953 - Babaing Kalbo
- 1954 - Galawgaw
- 1955 - Sapagka't Mahal Kita
- 1986 - Inday Inday sa Balitaw
- 1988 - Rosa Mistica
- 1988 - Bobo Cop
- 1988 - Puso sa Puso
- 1988 - One Two Bato, Three Four Bapor
- 1988 - Magkano ang Iyong Dangal?
- 1988 - Pik Pak Boom
- 1992 - Mahirap Maging Pogi
- 2000 - Kailangan Ko'y Ikaw

=== Television ===
- Buhay Artista
- Tarangtang-tangtang
- Dance-O-Rama
- Gorio En His Jeepney
- Dancetime with Chito
- Eskwelahang Munti
- Principe Abante
- Wish Ko Lang! - her last TV appearance
