= Angela Perez =

Filipino actress

- Born: Rowena Mora; 1967 or 1968
- Died: March 29, 2023 (aged 55); Philippines
- Occupation: Film actress
- Years active: 1983–1988
- Spouse: Ronaldo Lim
- Children: 4

Rowena Mora–Lim, known professionally as Angela Perez, was a Filipino actress.

== Career ==
Rowena Mora was known for her performance in "sexy films" of the 1980s. She was given the screen name of "Angela Perez" by Lily Monteverde due to her resemblance to Italian actress Pier Angeli.

Perez starred in the 1983 film Laruan of Falcon Films. Carmi Martin was her co-star in the film which centered around exploitation in the beauty pageant industry.

Her work in Laruan was followed by stints in other films such as Angela ay Basag ang Pula (1984), Take Home Girls (1984), Hayop Sa Sarap (1984), Makakating Hayop (1984), Manoy Hindi Ka Na Makakaisa (1985), Alexandria (1986), Isa Lang Ang Dapat Mabuhay (1986), Sgt. Villapando: AWOL (1986), and Paligayahin Mo Ako (1986).

Her last film was the 1988 work Akyat Bahay Gang which starred Lito Lapid. She retired from showbiz when she became pregnant and started her own family.

== Death ==
Perez died on March 29, 2023, due to stroke at age 55. She was rushed to a hospital in the Philippines but was declared dead on arrival.

== Personal life ==
Perez was married to Ronaldo Lim and had four children. She also has a sister, Cathy Mora who was also an actress.
