= Sa Kuko ng Agila =

- Directed by: Augusto Buenaventura
- Written by: Ricky Lee
- Produced by: Raymond Tan
- Starring: Joseph Estrada
- Cinematography: Fred Conde
- Edited by: Edgardo Vinarao
- Music by: Jaime Fabregas
- Production company: Richfilm
- Distributed by: Richfilm
- Release date: July 5, 1989
- Running time: 110 minutes
- Country: Philippines
- Languages: Filipino; English

Sa Kuko ng Agila (lit. 'In the Eagle's Claw') is a 1989 film directed by Augusto Buenaventura and written by Ricky Lee. The film stars Joseph Estrada, alongside Senator Nikki Coseteng, Maria Isabel Lopez, Tommy Abuel, Paquito Diaz and Jinggoy Estrada. The film is a depiction of the real Olongapo City when the U.S. Military bases were still there.

== Plot ==
Tonyo (Joseph Estrada), a mini-bus driver in Olongapo, opposes U.S. military bases in the Philippines. He saw the changes of the city after the military bases were established. Social problems of corruption, prostitution, poverty, and the plight of fishermen after the base appropriated much of the land and sea. The movie depicts his struggle between principle and practicality, a battle of healthy past and promising future and the quest for freedom and nationalism.

== Full cast ==
- Joseph "Erap" Estrada as Tonyo
- Anna Dominique "Nikki" Coseteng as Cristy
- Maria Isabel Lopez as Shirley
- Paquito Diaz as Martin
- Tommy Abuel as Lucio
- Jinggoy Estrada as Caloy
- Laurice Guillen as Lumeng
- Subas Herrero as Jose Morelos
- Ruben Rustia as Don Fernando
- Dexter Doria as Lolit
- Lara Melissa de Leon as Del
- Ilonah Jean as Anna
- Bomber Moran as Asyong
- Caloy Salvador as Badong
- Anna Ascalon as Photographer
- Rene Matias as Sunga
- Nick Nicholson

== Production ==
In early November 1988, Senators Joseph Estrada and Nikki Coseteng revealed to the press that they plan to star in a film called Sa Kuko ng Agila, which will revolve around the issue of United States military bases in the Philippines; the expected release date for the film was in February 1989.

== Accoladess ==
Year	Award-giving body	Category	Recipient	Result
1990	14th Gawad Urian Awards	Best Supporting Actress (Pinakamahusay na Pangalawang Aktres)	Maria Isabel Lopez	Nominated
