= Laurice Guillen =

Filipino actress and director (born 1947)

- Born: Laurice Ilagan Guillen; January 31, 1947 (age 79); Butuan, Agusan, Philippines
- Occupations: Actress, film and television director, college professor
- Years active: 1971–present
- Employer(s): GMA Network (1986–1996; 2013–present); ABS-CBN Corporation (2008; 2009–2013); TV5 (2008–2009)
- Spouse: Johnny Delgado
- Children: 2, including Ina Feleo

Laurice Ilagan Guillen-Feleo (born January 31, 1947) is a Filipino actress, film and television director, and college professor.

== Early life and acting career ==
Guillen studied at St. Theresa's College, Cebu City, earned an AB English degree before finishing an MA in Communication at Ateneo de Manila University, where she taught at the college level. She took a television production course under Nestor Torre, in 1967. She then began work as an actress, starring in productions of Mrs. Warren's Profession, before crossing over to film and television work, playing a seductress in Tinimbang Ka Ngunit Kulang, and Corazon Aquino in the drama A Dangerous Life.

In 2009, she accepted a role in the indie film Karera, her first role in an independent production. Other credits include such notable films as Tinimbang ka Ngunit Kulang (1974), Lunes, Martes ... (1975), Inay (1977); Init (1978); Ina, Kapatid, Anak (1979), Moral (1982); Nagalit ang Buwan sa haba ng Gabi (1983); and Sister Stella L (1984).

However, it was on television that she became a household name when she joined the cast of Flor de Luna in 1978 as Jo Alicante, Flor de Luna's temperamental step mother. She went on to portray the role until the mid-1980s when the show folded.

== Directing career ==
A protégé of Lino Brocka, Guillen began her first major work as a director with Kasal in 1979, followed by Kung Ako'y Iiwan Mo in 1980. In 1981, she made Salome for Bancom Audiovision with Gina Alajar in the lead, establishing herself as director with depth and substance. The movie was a critical success, and she won Best Director at the Gawad Urian. The same film was shown at the Toronto International Film Festival and described as "the kind of cinematic discovery that single-handedly justifies the festival's existence". Ipagpatawad Mo was also directed by Guillen, as was Dahil Mahal Kita: The Dolzura Cortez Story in 1993, before her retirement from filmmaking.

Dedicating herself to the Marian movement, Guillen made pilgrimages to churches and cathedrals throughout the Philippines with her husband, believing that Mary had called on her to experience a spiritual renewal. By 1998 she was thinking about returning to filmmaking, and following a good reception of Ipagpatawad Mo by a group of priests, who encouraged her to back into filmmaking, along with an appearance on Kris Aquino's talk show, she did so.

Her first new production was Tanging Yaman, released in 2001, which won several awards at the Metro Manila Film Festival. Following 2002's American Adobo, Guillen directed Santa Santita in 2004, which represented the Philippines at the Bangkok International Film Festival.

In 2006, she was awarded the Gawad Tanglaw ng Lahi by Ateneo de Manila University for services to the Arts. In 2009 she directed I Love You Goodbye, following it up with Sa 'yo Lamang in 2010, starring Lorna Tolentino. As well as working as a director, Guillen also was Chief Executive Officer of the Film Development Council of the Philippines, before her appointment was unexpectedly not renewed in 2005. After breaking away from the previous Filipino directors guild due to a desire for reform, Guillen helped found the Directors Guild of the Philippines, resigning on March 26, 2001, due to her feeling that this reform had not been carried out.

== Personal life ==
Guillen was married to Johnny Delgado, with whom she had two daughters, her youngest being actress Ina Feleo. He died of lymphoma in November 2009. Guillen is the cousin of former Piddig, Ilocos Norte mayor turned NIA acting administrator Eduardo Guillen.

== Filmography ==
=== As actor ===
==== Film ====
Year	Title	Role	Note(s)
1974	Fe, Esperanza, Caridad	Martha	
1974	Tinimbang Ka Ngunit Kulang	Milagros	
1977	Kung Mangarap Ka't Magising	Cecile	
1982	Moral	Maggie	
1983	Nagalit ang Buwan sa Haba ng Gabi	Delza Almeda	
1986	Palimos ng Pag-ibig	Mitos	
1987	Kung Aagawin Mo ang Lahat sa Akin	Donya Clara Andrada	
1989	Sa Kuko ng Agila	Lumeng	
2003	Noon at Ngayon: Pagsasamang Kay Ganda	Maggie	
2008	Dayo: Sa Mundo ng Elementalia	Bruha / Diwata / Kapress	Voice role
2010	Babe, I Love You	Isabel Veneracion-Borromeo	

==== Television ====
Year	Title	Role	Note(s)
1979	Flordeluna	Jo	
1988	A Dangerous Life	Corazon Aquino	Miniseries
2008	Iisa Pa Lamang	Estelle Torralba†	
2009–2010	Nagsimula sa Puso	Teresa Pagdanganan	
2011–2012	Reputasyon	Doña Concordia Villamayor	
2012	Maalaala Mo Kaya: Tumba-Tumba	Ofelia	
2012–2013	Aryana	Doña Elnora Mendez	
2013	Genesis	Rosario Macalintal	
2014	Carmela: Ang Pinakamagandang Babae sa Mundong Ibabaw	Dra. Fides Hernando-Torres†	
2023	Unbreak My Heart	Doña Lily Tansengco-Zhang†	
2026	Sanggang-Dikit FR	Hon. Marven Salud	

=== As director ===
==== Film ====
Year	Name	Notes
1980	Kasal?	Directorial debut
1988	Magkano ang Iyong Dangal?	
1990	Kapag Langit ang Humatol	
1991	Una Kang Naging Akin	
1991	Ipagpatawad Mo	
1993	Dahil Mahal Kita: The Dolzura Cortez Story	
2000	Tanging Yaman	
2001	American Adobo	
2004	Santa Santita	
2009	I Love You, Goodbye	
2010	Sa 'yo Lamang	
2014	Once a Princess	
2019	Man and Wife	

==== Television ====
Year	Title
1986	Lovingly Yours, Helen
2008	HushHush
2013	Akin Pa Rin ang Bukas
2015	Second Chances
2016	Hanggang Makita Kang Muli
2016–2018	Ika-6 na Utos
2018–2019	Ika-5 Utos
2020–2021	Bilangin ang Bituin sa Langit
2022	Apoy sa Langit
2024–2025	Asawa ng Asawa Ko
2025	Mga Batang Riles

== Awards and recognitions ==
Year	Award-giving body	Category	Work	Result
1988	Metro Manila Film Festival	Best Director	Magkano ang Iyong Dangal?	Won
2000	Metro Manila Film Festival	Best Director	Tanging Yaman	Won
2000	Metro Manila Film Festival	Best Screenplay (with Shaira Mella Salvador and Raymond Lee)	Tanging Yaman	Won
2000	Metro Manila Film Festival	Best Original Story	Tanging Yaman	Won
2011	9th Gawad Tanglaw Awards	Presidential Jury Award		Won
2011	9th Gawad Tanglaw Awards	Best Director	Sa 'Yo Lamang	Won
