= Patrolman (film) =

1988 action film starring Baldo Marro

- Directed by: Cesar SB. Abella
- Screenplay by: Humilde 'Meek' Roxas
- Story by: Cesar SB. Abella
- Starring: Baldo Marro; Melissa Mendez; Sunshine; Raoul Aragonn; Dick Israel; Zandro Zamora; Arwin Rogelio; Odette Khan
- Cinematography: Joe Tutanes
- Edited by: Tony Sy
- Music by: Rey Ramos
- Production company: El Niño Films
- Release date: December 25, 1988
- Country: Philippines
- Language: Filipino

Patrolman is a 1988 Filipino action film directed by Cesar SB. Abella and starring stuntman Baldo Marro as the titular patrolman. It also stars Melissa Mendez, Sunshine, Raoul Aragonn, Dick Israel, Zandro Zamora, Arwin Rogelio, and Odette Khan. Based on a true story, the film is about a dedicated and honest policeman who becomes a target of the New People's Army's Sparrow Unit. The film was produced by El Niño Films and released on December 25, 1988, as part of the 14th Metro Manila Film Festival (MMFF).

== Cast ==
- Baldo Marro
- Melissa Mendez
- Sunshine
- Raul Aragon
- Dick Israel
- Zandro Zamora
- Odette Khan
- Arwin Rogelio
- Ramon 'Bong' Revilla Jr.
- Robin Padilla
- George Estregan Jr.
- Philip Gamboa
- King Gutierrez
- Eddie Nicart
- Robert Miller
- Ushman Hassim
- Romy Nario
- Ernie David
- Vic Varrion
- Ernie Forte
- Boy Ranay
- Danny Labra
- Nonong de Andres
- Philip Henson
- Edward Luna
- Ray Alsona
- Andrew Guevarra
- Dave Guanson
- Mark Tiongson
- Billy Viña
- Nemie Gutierrez
- Jing Caparas
- Donn de Vera
- Benjie Corpuz
- Bebeng Amora

== Release ==
Patrolman was given a "P-15" rating by the Movie and Television Review and Classification Board (MTRCB), and was released on December 25, 1988, as part of the 14th Metro Manila Film Festival (MMFF).

== Reception ==
=== Box office ===
On its opening day, Patrolman grossed ₱381 thousand, the least-grossing film among the six MMFF films. By January, however, the film was able to surpass Itanong Mo sa Buwan, and ranked fifth out of all the entries to the festival.

=== Critical response ===
Patrolman won three MMFF awards, for Best Picture, Best Actor (Marro), and Best Supporting Actor (Israel).

Marro's win for Best Actor is considered an upset by many, as Christopher de Leon was more critically favored for his performance in Magkano ang Iyong Dangal?.

Lav Diaz, writing for the Manila Standard, gave Patrolman a negative review, criticizing the film for putting excessive emphasis on its theme of the ideal policeman in both dialogue and visuals, with his own review being titled "Propaganda of the police". He also questioned why the Sparrow team of young rebels and hitmen targeted Marro's character, an overall righteous policeman, without a clear reason for doing so. However, Diaz admitted that the film is able to effectively hit upon a person's conscience, accidental or otherwise.

== Controversy ==
Baldo Marro, a stuntman who had solely received supporting roles before Patrolman, won the MMFF Award for Best Actor. His win is generally considered an upset by many, as he beat out favored actor Christopher de Leon, who received acclaim for his performance in Magkano ang Iyong Dangal?. Actress Armida Siguion-Reyna expressed the sentiment that both de Leon and Mark Gil, the latter from Itanong Mo sa Buwan, were more deserving of the MMFF Best Actor award than Marro, stating that "I like Baldo – but that is beside the point. Let us not be cruel to him by making him believe that what he did is great acting."

== Accolades ==
Group	Category	Name	Result
Metro Manila Film Festival	Best Picture	Patrolman	Won
Metro Manila Film Festival	Best Actor	Baldo Marro	Won
Metro Manila Film Festival	Best Supporting Actor	Dick Israel	Won
FAMAS Awards	Best Supporting Actor	Dick Israel	Nominated
FAMAS Awards	Best Child Actress	Sunshine	Nominated
FAMAS Awards	Best Editing	Tony Sy	Nominated
FAMAS Awards	Best Sound	Gabby Castillan	Nominated

== Sequel ==
A sequel, Amok: Patrolman 2, was released in 1989.

== See also ==
Films which also depict the New People's Army's Sparrow Unit:

- Target: Sparrow Unit (1987)
- Ambush (1988)
- Alex Boncayao Brigade (1989)
