= Harlene Bautista =

Filipina former child star, actress, producer and businesswoman

- Born: October 27, 1973 (age 52); Quezon City, Philippines
- Occupation: Actress
- Spouse: Romnick Sarmenta (separated)

Harlene Maclang Bautista (born October 27, 1973) is a Filipina former child star, film and television actress, film producer and businesswoman in the Philippines.

In 1989, Bautista won the FAP Award for Best Supporting Actress for Gawa Na ang Bala Na Papatay sa Iyo starring Fernando Poe Jr.

== Career ==
Bautista appeared as child star in films like Oh, My Mama (1981) with Maricel Soriano, Ten Little Indians (1981) with William Martinez, Dear God (1982) with Alma Moreno and Lukaret (1983) with Irma Alegre. She was nominated for FAMAS Award as Best Child Actress for Broken Marriage (1983).

She also became a member of That's Entertainment Thursday Group during her teenage along with Vina Morales, Jennifer Sevilla, Keempee de Leon and Smokey Manaloto, among others.

She also did movies such as Anak ng Demonyo (1989) with Ian Veneracion, Kunin Mo Ang Ulo Ni Ismael (1990) with Jestoni Alarcon, and she played as the daughter of Fernando Poe Jr. in Dito sa Pitong Gatang (1992) with Nanette Medved.

Bautista became the producer of movies like Umaaraw, Umuulan (2006), Burgos (2013) with Lorna Tolentino, directed by Joel Lamangan, and Raketeros (2013) with Herbert Bautista, Ogie Alcasid, Andrew E. and Joey Marquez, directed by Randy Santiago.

== Personal life ==
Bautista was born on October 27, 1973. Her parents are Rosario Bautista and actor-director Herminio 'Butch' Bautista. She is the sister of actors Herbert Bautista (served as Mayor of Quezon City) and Hero Bautista.

She was married to actor Romnick Sarmenta. On October 5, 2018, Bautista announced their separation from the marriage.

== Filmography ==
=== Film ===
- Oh, My Mama (1981)
- Ten Little Indians (1981)
- Ambrocio Defontorum (1981)
- Dear God (1982)
- Lukaret (1983)
- Broken Marriage (1983)
- Baby Tsina (1984)
- Ride on Baby (1985)
- Escort Girls (1985)
- Mga Kwento ni Lola Basyang (1985)
- Rocky Four-Ma (1986)
- Isang Kumot Tatlong Unan (1986)
- Tu-Yay and His Magic Payong (1986)
- Hiwaga sa Balete Drive (1988)
- Hindi Tao, Hindi Hayop: Adventures of Seiko Jewels (1988)
- Gawa Na ang Bala Na Papatay sa Iyo (1988)
- One Two Bato, Three Four Bapor (1988)
- Walang Panginoon (1989)
- Anak ng Demonyo (1989)
- Kunin Mo ang Ulo ni Ismael (1990)
- Dito sa Pitong Gatang (1992)
- Sa Paraiso ni Efren (1999)
- Live Show (2000)
- Nars (2007)

=== Television ===
- That's Entertainment (1986)
- 357 Kamagong (1988)
- May Bukas Pa (1999–2001)
- Sa Dulo ng Walang Hanggan (2001–2003)
- Bituin (2002–2003)
- Saang Sulok ng Langit (2005)
- Home Boy (2006)
- Ikaw Sana (2009–2010)
- First Time (2010)
- Walang Tulugan with the Master Showman (2016)
