= Urban Terrorist =

1988 Filipino action film

- Directed by: Dante Javier
- Written by: Lito Mena
- Starring: Mark Gil; Ronnie Ricketts; Vivian Foz; Tom Olivar; Kristel Romero; Dick Israel; E.R. Ejercito
- Edited by: Joe Ramirez
- Production company: South Cotabato Films
- Release date: April 22, 1988
- Running time: 103 minutes
- Country: Philippines
- Language: Filipino

Urban Terrorist is a 1988 Filipino action film directed by Dante Javier and starring Mark Gil, Ronnie Ricketts, Vivian Foz, Tom Olivar, Kristel Romero, Dick Israel, E.R. Ejercito, Dhouglas Veron, Juan Rodrigo, and Charlie Davao. Produced by South Cotabato Films, the film was released on April 22, 1988. Critic Lav Diaz panned the film, criticizing its direction, writing, cinematography, editing, and anachronistic elements.

== Cast ==
- Mark Gil
- Ronnie Ricketts
- Vivian Foz
- Tom Olivar
- Kristel Romero
- Dick Israel
- E.R. Ejercito
- Dhouglas Veron
- Juan Rodrigo
- Charlie Davao
- Nel de la Isla
- Eva Rica
- Alex de Leon

== Release ==
Urban Terrorist was released on April 22, 1988.

=== Critical response ===
Lav Diaz, writing for the Manila Standard, severely criticized the film for its unfocused writing and poor cinematography and editing, placing the blame on director Dante Javier as he considered his previous films to be better in quality compared to Urban Terrorist. He also criticized the anachronistic elements found in the film such as several characters wearing Reebok shoes in 1979, as well as the 1980s apparel worn of Kristel Romero's communist rebel character. Diaz determined that Urban Terrorist is "another manifestation of the decay that is occurring in Filipino cinema."
