= Dingdong Avanzado =

Filipino singer, actor, politician and TV host

The Honorable Fernando "Dingdong" V. Avanzado

Vice Governor of Siquijor
- In office June 30, 2013 – June 30, 2016
- Governor: Zaldy S. Villa
- Preceded by: Art Pacatang
- Succeeded by: Mei Ling Quezon

Member of Quezon City Council from the 3rd district
- In office June 30, 1998 – June 30, 2001

Personal details
- Born: Fernando Cyril Veloso Avanzado; July 7, 1968 (age 58) Quezon City, Philippines
- Party: Liberal (2010–2013); LDP (2004); Lakas (2001–2004); LAMMP (1998–2001)
- Spouse: Jessa Zaragoza (m. 2001)
- Children: Jayda Avanzado
- Education: CAP College Foundation
- Occupation: Singer, actor, TV host, politician
- Musical career
- Genres: OPM; Pop
- Years active: 1987–present
- Labels: Dyna Music; PolyEast Records; Sony Music; Star Music; Universal Records; Viva Records

Fernando Cyril "Dingdong" Veloso Avanzado (born July 7, 1968, Quezon City, Philippines) is an entertainer and politician. He has been called "Prince of Pinoy pop". His career began as a singer-songwriter of popular music, leading to the release of several albums and concerts in the Philippines and internationally. Avanzado has also been a television host and has acted in films. In 2013, Avanzado was elected to the vice governorship of Siquijor province.

== Personal life ==
Avanzado was born on July 7, 1968, in Quezon City. In 2018, Avanzado told the Philippine Daily Inquirer that his maternal grandfather was a governor and congressman on Samar island, his grandmother was a judge and his paternal grandfather was a doctor. His mother, Carina Flores is a lawyer, public servant (previously a mayor of Oton) and a politician. Avanzado was a member of Kundirana, music group of La Salle Green Hills private high school in Mandaluyong city.

Avanzado met Jessa Zaragoza, a singer and actress, in 1998. Avanzado and Zaragoza have performed and toured together. The couple moved to Vallejo, California in 2007 and married in 2011. They have a daughter, Jayda Avanzado who is also a singer. By 2012, they had returned to the Philippines.

== Career ==
Avanzado's music career began in 1987 when he appeared on The Penthouse Live!, a variety television show, to sing Trapped in a Stairway. He also appeared in Shine On, a concert at the Rizal theater in Makati. In 1988, Avanzado performed in Full Blast at the Tanghalang Francisco Balagtas (folk arts theater) in Manila and was named most promising entertainer of the year at the Aliw Awards. In the same year, Avanzado signed with Dyna Records. He released his first album, Tatlong Beinte Singko. Two singles on the record, the title song and Maghihintay sa yo, reached the top of the charts.

In the late 1980s and early 1990s, Avanzado toured the Philippines and performed twice at the PhilSports Arena. He acted in some young adult films such as Pik Pak Boom, I Love You 3x a Day, Estudyante Blues, and Love at First Sight.

In 1994, Avanzado's acting career continued with the films Paniwalaan Mo, an OctoArts Films production inspired by one of his songs. In this film, he played the role of Dawn Zulueta’s brother. In the cast were Aga Muhlach, Jamie Rivera, and Tonton Gutierrez. In 1995, Avanzado co-wrote the song, Paalam Na with Rachel Alejandro. It won "song of the year" and "best ballad recording" at the Awit awards. In 1996, Avanzado won the Awit for his song I will be there for you.

In 1997, Avanzado recorded his seventh album, Decade After with GMA Records. It is a retrospective of the prior ten years of his career. The tracks on the album include Wish I Could and To Love Again by Sharon Cuneta.

In 2000, Avanzado released the album, Here To Stay, under the Star Records label. The popular song, Walang Kapalit was written by Rey Valera. In 2005, Avanzado released an album of duets Laging Ikaw, under the Universal Records label and in 2012, he released Download, produced by Viva Records. It is a reflection of social media trends of the day. All tracks on this album were original songs written by Avanzado.

== Political career ==
In 1998, Avanzado was elected to the city council of the 3rd District of Quezon City. Over the following three years, he promoted Quezon City as the "City of Stars", highlighting the major networks of the film and music industry to boost tourism.

In 2013, he was a Liberal Party candidate and was elected Vice Governor of Siquijor. Avanzado received 25,159 votes compared to the 20,472 of his opponent.

== Discography ==
=== Studio albums ===
- Dingdong Avanzado (1988; Dyna Music)
- Just Can't Stop (1989; Dyna Music)
- Reachin' High (1991; OctoArts International)
- Coming of Age (1993; OctoArts International)
- Brand New Love (1994; OctoArts International)
- Decade After (1997; Infiniti Music)
- Recall (1999; Infiniti Music – distribution under BMG Records Pilipinas)
- Here to Stay (2003; Star Music)
- Laging Ikaw (with Jessa Zarragoza) (2005; Universal Records)
- Download (2012; Viva Records)

=== Extended play albums ===
- Dingdong Avanzado Extended Play (1987; Dyna Music)

=== Compilation albums ===
- The Best of Dingdong Avanzado (1992; Dyna Music)
- OPM Timeless Hits: Dingdong Avanzado (1997; PolyEast Records)
- The Story of Dingdong Avanzado (2002; PolyEast Records)

=== Singles ===
- Ikaw Lamang (1987)
- Just Can't Stop (1989)
- Break Kung Break (1989)
- Please, Baby, Please (1989)
- Basta't Kasama Kita (1989)
- Naghihintay Sa'yo (1989)
- Download (2012)
- Pangarap (2012)

=== Music videos ===
- Wish I Could (1996)
- Download (2012)
- Pangarap (2012)

=== Covers by other artists ===
- Basta't Kasama Kita (1989) was covered by Josh Santana & Daryl Ong and the pinoy punk rock band, The Ultimate Heroes. It was also used in the television series Basta't Kasama Kita and Ang Probinsyano.

== Awards ==
- Song of the Year – Paalam Na, Awit Awards 1995
- Best Ballad Recording – Paalam Na, Awit Awards 1995
- Best Dance Recording – I Will Be There For You, Awit Awards 1996
- Best Concert Director (nomination) – Aliw Awards 2005
- Celebrity Inductee Winner – Eastwood City Walk of Fame, Philippines 2009

== Filmography ==
=== Television ===
- I Love You Three Times a Day (1982)
- That's Entertainment (1986–1991)
- Estudyante Blues (1989–1990)
- Paniwalaan Mo (1993)
- ASAP (1995)
- 9 Mornings – performer (2002)
- Shall We Dance: The Celebrity Dance Challenge (2005)
- Magpakailanman (2005)
- Jologs Guide (2005)
- Balikbayan (2005)
- Noel (2005)
- Search for the Star in a Million (2005–2006)
- O-Ha! (2006)
- Pinoy Dream Academy: Little Dreamers (2008)
- Talentadong Pinoy (2009)
- Sarap at Home (2010)
- Showtime (2010)
- Bagets: Just Got Lucky (2011)
- Walang Tulugan with the Master Showman (2014)
- Trenderas (2014)
- Sabado Badoo (2015)
- Sunday PinaSaya (2015)
- Full House Tonight (2017)
- Celebrity Bluff Season 3 (2017)
- Your Face Sounds Familiar (2018)
- Wowowin (2020)
- Happy Time (2021) (NET 25)
- Sing Galing: Sing-lebrity Edition (2021)
- It's Showtime (2023–present)

=== Film ===
- I Love You 3x a Day (1988)
- Pik Pak Boom (1988) - Sonny
- Estudyante Blues (1989)
