= Itanong Mo sa Buwan =

1988 crime thriller drama by Chito S. Roño

- Official movie poster
- Directed by: Chito S. Roño
- Written by: Armando "Bing" Lao
- Produced by: Mike Miranda; Roberto U. Genova
- Starring: Mark Gil; Jaclyn Jose; Anjo Yllana
- Cinematography: Charlie S. Peralta
- Edited by: Abelardo Hulleza
- Music by: Jose "Toto" Gentica V
- Production company: Double M Films International
- Distributed by: Solar Entertainment
- Release date: 25 December 1988
- Running time: 115 minutes
- Country: Philippines
- Languages: Filipino; Chavacano

Itanong Mo sa Buwan (English: Ask the Moon), internationally titled as The Moonchild, is a 1988 Philippine crime thriller drama film directed by Chito S. Roño from a story and screenplay written by Armando "Bing" Lao. With the plot being similarly patterned to Akira Kurosawa's 1950 film Rashomon, it follows a bank robber and a woman whom he held hostage who describe the events of the bank robbery. It stars Mark Gil, Jaclyn Jose, and Anjo Yllana, with the supporting cast including Anita Linda, Tita Muñoz, Susan Africa, Lucita Soriano, and Fernando Morato.

Produced by Double M Films International, which was helmed by producer Mike Miranda, the film was theatrically released on 25 December 1988, as one of the entries of the 14th Metro Manila Film Festival. It also received an overseas premiere in West Germany on 11 February 1989, as one of the films exhibited under the "Forum 1989" section of the 39th Berlin International Film Festival.

== Plot ==
Josie and Sammy are a young couple who have a dull relationship; the former is a bank employee, while her husband is a nursing student. One day, a group of suspicious men, consisting of Angelito Asuncion, Tikboy, and a few others, committed a holdup in a bank, but were foiled when the police shot Tikboy. Later on, Josie was taken hostage. Following the incident, a manhunt was commenced, and after she was freed, Josie decided to tell her testimony to the police.

After Asuncion ran away from the authorities, he took Josie to a house in Ternate, Cavite, where he and his aunt Juana lived. There, he seduces Josie and then treats her like a prisoner whenever she tries to escape. Before he passes away, Asuncion says that he denies what he did to Josie.

Sammy committed suicide. The film ends with Josie finally deciding to tell the truth, which reveals that she and Angelito made the bank robbery plan.

== Cast ==
- Mark Gil as Angelito Asuncion, the man who attempted to rob a bank and took Josie hostage
- Jaclyn Jose as Josefina "Josie" Peralta, Sammy's wife who works as a bank teller
- Anjo Yllana as Samuel "Sammy" Peralta, Josie's husband
- Anita Linda as Juana, Angelito's aunt
- Susan Africa as Josie's officemate
- Lucita Soriano as Josie's mother
- Bodjie Pascua as the bank manager
- Archie Adamos as Tikboy, Angelito's associate in committing a holdup

The PETA Kalinangan Ensemble was featured in the film as extras.

== Production ==
During the course of the production, the relationship between lead stars Mark Gil and Jaclyn Jose blossomed into a romance while they were filming in San Pablo, Laguna.

== Release ==
Itanong Mo sa Buwan was theatrically released on 25 December 1988, and it was first shown in 31 theaters across Metro Manila and its neighboring provinces. It was later received an international release via the 39th Berlin International Film Festival, where it was exhibited under the "Forum 1989" category.

== Reception ==
=== Box office ===
On its opening day, Itanong Mo sa Buwan grossed ₱460,000, the second-lowest-grossing film among the six entries. However, in January 1989, it became the lowest-grossing entry when Patrolman ranked fifth.

=== Accolades ===
Accolades received by Itanong Mo sa Buwan
Year	Award	Category	Recipient(s)	Result	Ref.
1988	14th Metro Manila Film Festival	Best Picture	Itanong Mo sa Buwan	Nominated	
1988	14th Metro Manila Film Festival	Best Actor	Mark Gil	Nominated	
1988	14th Metro Manila Film Festival	Best Sound Engineering	Albert Rima	Won	
1989	PMPC Star Awards for Movies	Best Picture	Itanong Mo sa Buwan	Won	
1989	PMPC Star Awards for Movies	Best Director	Chito S. Roño	Won	
1989	PMPC Star Awards for Movies	Best Actor	Mark Gil	Nominated	
1989	PMPC Star Awards for Movies	Best Actress	Jaclyn Jose	Won	
1989	PMPC Star Awards for Movies	Best Supporting Actor	Anjo Yllana	Nominated	
1989	PMPC Star Awards for Movies	Best Original Screenplay	Itanong Mo sa Buwan, written by Armando Lao	Nominated	
1989	PMPC Star Awards for Movies	Best Cinematography	Charlie F. Peralta	Nominated	
1989	PMPC Star Awards for Movies	Best Editing	Abelardo Hulleza	Won	
