= RR Herrera =

Filipino actor

RR Herrera is a Filipino actor, and was a child actor in the Philippines. He won the Metro Manila Film Festival Best Child Performer for Agila Ng Maynila (1988) and FAMAS Award Best Child Actor for the movie Rosenda (1989).

== Career ==
Herrera began his acting career at the age of seven, appearing in the TV show Agila (1987). He later appeared in the films FPJ-starrers Hindi Ka Na Sisikatan ng Araw (1990) and Batas ng .45 (1991), among others.

He was one of the regular hosts of the variety show Eh Kasi Bata, along with Aiza Seguerra, L.A. Lopez and Kathleen Go Quieng.

Herrera guested in ABS-CBN's Kris TV (2011).

== Personal life ==
Herrera received a bachelor's degree in Communications Technology from the Ateneo de Manila University. He is now regional director of TrainStation.

Herrera's life partner is Carelle Mangaliag, who was famous for her stint as one of the singers for the 1995 World Youth Day Philippines theme song, 'Tell the World of His Love'.

Herrera is a licensed SCUBA diver and hobbyist underwater photographer.

== Awards and nominations ==
Herrera has won or been nominated for the following awards:

Year	Award-giving body	Category	Work nominated	Result	Source
1992	FAMAS Awards	Best Child Actor	Batas ng .45 (1991)	Nominated	
1991	FAMAS Awards	Best Child Actor	Bala at Rosario (1991)	Nominated	
1990	MMFF	Best Child Performer	Andrea, Paano Ba ang Maging Isang Ina? (1990)	Nominated	
1990	FAMAS Awards	Best Child Actor	Rosenda (1989)	Won	
1989	Gawad Urian Awards	Best Child Performer	Ex Army (1988)	Nominated	
1989	FAMAS Awards	Best Child Actor	Agila ng Maynila (1988)	Nominated	
1988	MMFF	Best Child Performer	Agila ng Maynila (1988)	Won	

== Filmography ==
Herrera has appeared in the following films and TV shows:

- Bunsong Kerubin (1987)
- 1 + 1 = 12 + 1 (1987)
- Agila (TV series; 1987-1992)
- Stupid Cupid (1988)
- Nasaan Ka Inay? (1988)
- Ex-Army (1988)
- One Day, Isang Araw (1988)
- Sandakot Na Bala (1988)
- Agila ng Maynila (1988)
- Barbi: Maid In The Philippines (1989)
- Orapronobis (1989)
- Impaktita (1989)
- Delima Gang (1989)
- Rosenda (1989)
- Wanted: Pamilya Banal (1989)
- Isang Bala, Isang Buhay (1989)
- Carnap King? (The Randy Padilla Story) (1989)
- Biokids (1990)
- Bala at Rosaryo (1990)
- Hindi Ka Na Sisikatan ng Araw: Kapag Puno Na ang Salop Part III (1990)
- Andrea, Paano Ba ang Maging Isang Ina? (1990)
- Batas ng .45 (1991)
- At Your Service - Child Stars Reunited (TV program; 2005)
- Fidel (2009)
- Panahon Na (2009)
- Fling (2010)
- Rainbow Rumble (2026)
