= Agila ng Maynila =

1988 action film starring Fernando Poe Jr.

- Theatrical poster
- Directed by: Pablo P. Santiago
- Screenplay by: Pablo S. Gomez
- Story by: Nards Sanggalang; Ronwaldo Reyes
- Produced by: FPJ
- Starring: Fernando Poe Jr.
- Cinematography: Ver Reyes
- Edited by: Augusto Salvador
- Music by: Jaime Fabregas
- Production company: FPJ Productions
- Release date: December 25, 1988
- Running time: 110 minutes
- Country: Philippines
- Language: Filipino

Agila ng Maynila (lit. 'Eagle of Manila') is a 1988 Filipino action film directed by Pablo Santiago, written by Pablo S. Gomez, and produced by Fernando Poe Jr., who stars as Mauro Reyes, the titular "eagle" of Manila. The film also stars Vic Vargas, Paquito Diaz, Charlie Davao, Raoul Aragon, Vic Diaz, Dencio Padilla, Lito Anzures, Mario Escudero, and Lucita Soriano.

Produced by FPJ Productions, Agila ng Maynila was released on December 25, 1988, as part of the 14th Metro Manila Film Festival (MMFF). Agila ng Maynila was the highest-grossing film among the six entries of the festival, and R.R. Herrera won the MMFF Award for Best Child Performer.

== Cast ==
- Fernando Poe Jr. as Mauro Reyes
- Vic Vargas as Capt. Victor Labrador
- Paquito Diaz as Castro
- Charlie Davao as Col. Ernesto Garriga
- Raoul Aragon as Butch Arriola
- Vic Diaz as Mr. Frisco Tablante
- Dencio Padilla as Emong
- Lito Anzures as Lolo Intoy
- Mario Escudero as Dado Santos
- Lucita Soriano as Gina
- Nello Nayo as Mr. Oyong
- Max Alvarado as Badong Busangol
- Encar Benedicto as Nemia Labrador
- R.R. Herrera as Pepe

== Release ==
Agila ng Maynila was given a "P-15" rating by the Movie and Television Review and Classification Board (MTRCB), and was released on December 25, 1988, as one of the official entries for the 14th Metro Manila Film Festival (MMFF).

=== Box office ===
On its opening day, Agila ng Maynila grossed ₱2.570 million, ahead of other MMFF films. By January, the film would retain its standing as the highest-grossing film among the six entries of the 14th MMFF. Poe's enduring popularity among the Filipino people is cited as the main reason for the film's success.

=== Critical response ===
Lav Diaz, writing for the Manila Standard, grouped Agila ng Maynila with Celestina Sanchez, Alyas Bubbles – Enforcer: Ativan Gang and Patrolman as films which directly placed the "dark face of the police establishment" on public trial. Though Diaz did not give an assessment of the film's quality, he described it as possessing a positive outlook, with the main character having the perspective that society needs only a hero to fix its problems and the police.

== Home media ==
Agila ng Maynila was released on DVD by Viva Video in 2006. The next year, Viva Video would pair the film for its "Da King" collector's edition DVD with Ang Anino ni Asedillo, a film starring Poe's half-brother Conrad Poe and featuring an appearance by Poe himself.

== Accolades ==
Group	Category	Name	Result
Metro Manila Film Festival	Best Child Performer	R.R. Herrera	Won
FAMAS Awards	Best Picture - Action	Agila ng Maynila	Nominated
FAMAS Awards	Best Child Actor	R.R. Herrera	Nominated
PMPC Star Awards for Movies	Best Child Performer	R.R. Herrera	Nominated
