= Pik Pak Boom =

1988 comedy film directed by Leroy Salvador

- Official movie poster
- Directed by: Leroy Salvador
- Written by: Mia Concio (Manyika); Loida Virina (Banana Q)
- Produced by: Ramon R. Salvador
- Starring: Herbert Bautista; Lea Salonga; Lilet; Bing Loyzaga; Regine Velasquez; Dingdong Avanzado
- Cinematography: Sergio Lobo
- Edited by: Renato de Leon
- Music by: Mon del Rosario
- Production company: Viva Films
- Release date: December 25, 1988
- Country: Philippines
- Language: Filipino

Pik Pak Boom is a 1988 Filipino anthology comedy film directed by Leroy Salvador and starring Herbert Bautista, Lea Salonga, Lilet, Bing Loyzaga, Regine Velasquez, and Dingdong Avanzado. The film consists of two segments: "Manyika" (lit. 'Doll') and "Banana Q". Produced by Viva Films, Pik Pak Boom was released on December 25, 1988, as part of the 14th Metro Manila Film Festival (MMFF).

Pik Pak Boom was the second highest-grossing film among the six entries of the festival, after Agila ng Maynila, and won the award for Best Production Design (Manny B. Morfe).

== Plot ==
"Manyika" tells about the story of Marie, a wayward fairy banished from her kingdom due to her mischievous deeds. She was turned into a lifeless doll as a punishment by the Fairy Queen and was brought to Earth. As a doll she was later found by siblings Danny and Rosie. After being cleaned up, she transformed into a talking doll which at first scared both Danny and Rosie. Later on she wins the trust of the siblings when she transforms the siblings' shanty into a well-designed house, Danny's bike into a car and Rosie's awkward voice into a singing voice. However, Marie's transformations to them were only temporary as everything turns back to normal by the strike of 12 midnight.

Initially, while winning the admirations of their respective classmates for the instant good life Marie had bestowed on them, Danny and Rosie were aware that they are only living temporarily on their respective comfortable status. However, greed and ambition consumed the siblings. Danny accepts the drag race challenged by his rival classmate Jerry with his magic car as the prize, while Rosie auditions for a singing contest held in their barangay. With both events finishing past midnight, Danny loses in the drag race while Rosie lost her voice in the middle of singing in the competition. Marie was forced to extend her magic past the scheduled time after Rosie angrily demands to her to restore her singing voice, with Rosie ending up winning at the contest. Upon reaching home, Marie had an argument with both siblings for abusing her kindness when she discovers that the two had forgotten that their comfortable life is only a temporary set-up. Rosie ends up slapping Marie which causes the latter to transform back into a lifeless doll.

Marie returns to her kingdom realizing the mistakes that she had previously committed as a fairy. She asks for forgiveness from everyone and was pardoned by both the Fairy Mother and the Fairy Queen. She also permanently regains her status as a fairy. Realizing the kindness that Rosie and Danny accorded to her when she was a doll on Earth she forgives the siblings and rewards them with their comfortable life permanently returned to both.

"Banana Q" is the story of Berto, a poor student who sells banana-cue at their school. He gets into trouble at school when he accidentally throws a stick of banana cue and pours softdrink at their advisor Miss Dimatanganan after a prank by his rich friends Dolly and Sonny went wrong. Later on, he gets thrown out of his house by his aunt Petra for being lazy. With his belongings, he ends up at Irma's boarding house where both Irma and her mother Mrs. Posadas reluctantly took him in. Ironically, his rich friends Dolly and Sonny joined him as well in that boarding house as stowaways because they were also neglected by their own families despite having a comfortable life.

At first, Berto, Irma, Dolly and Sonny were enjoying a comfortable life at the boarding house. But later on, Dolly's father Don Enriquez founds out about the set-up Dolly was into and forcibly gets his daughter back. However, he has a change of heart later on after Dolly lets him realize they need to spend more time together as a family. Berto also decides to end his lazy ways and goes back to selling banana-cue while becoming diligent to his studies. Dolly later on was able to convince his father to help out Berto in paying for his tuition. Sonny and Irma also contributed in their own way in helping out Berto reunite with his Aunt Petra which eventually happened during their high school graduation.

The movie ends with the entire cast of the two segments joined together in singing the movie theme song.

== Cast ==
- Manyika
  - Herbert Bautista as Danny
  - Lea Salonga as Rosie
  - Lilet as Marie
  - Jay-Jay Salvador as Jerry
  - Cathy Mora as Vicky
  - Richard Reynoso as Elmer
  - Delia Razon as Fairy Queen
  - Marita Zobel as Fairy Mother
  - George Shoemaker as nuno sa punso (transl. old man in the ant mound)
- Banana Q
  - Herbert Bautista as Berto
  - Bing Loyzaga as Dolly
  - Regine Velasquez as Irma
  - Dingdong Avanzado as Sonny
  - Luz Valdez as Mrs. Posadas
  - Subas Herrero as Don Enriquez
  - Nena Perez Rubio as Dean
  - Metring David as Miss Dimatanganan
  - Moody Diaz as Tia Petra

== Release ==
Pik Pak Boom was given a "G" rating by the Movie and Television Review and Classification Board (MTRCB), and was released on December 25, 1988, as part of the 14th Metro Manila Film Festival (MMFF).

=== Box office ===
On its opening day, Pik Pak Boom grossed ₱2.458 million, behind Agila ng Maynila but ahead of other MMFF films. By January, the film would retain its standing as the second highest-grossing film among the six entries of the 14th MMFF.

== Accolades ==
Group	Category	Name	Result
Metro Manila Film Festival	Best Production Design	Manny B. Morfe	Won
