= Lilet =

Filipino actor and singer

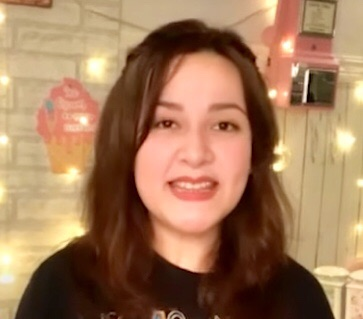
- Born: Maria Luz Lilet Navarro Jodloman; January 17, 1974 (age 52); Manila, Philippines
- Education: St. Joseph's College of Quezon City
- Occupations: Singer, actress, composer, host, commercial model
- Years active: 1986–present
- Agent: Cornerstone Entertainment Inc. (2015–present)
- Known for: Marissa "Isay" Mariano in My Special Tatay; Gloria Domingo in Niña Niño
- Spouse: Jay Esteban (m. 2006)
- Children: 1

Maria Luz Lilet Navarro Jodloman-Esteban (born January 17, 1974), professionally known as Lilet, is a Filipino singer, television host, actress, and model. She is known as "The Muse of OPM" (Original Pilipino Music).

== Career ==
As among the Filipino endorsers of Coca-Cola, Lilet first appeared in an international commercial, singing "Tomorrow's People", which was shot in Liverpool, England.

Her first musical album was entitled Lonely Girl, produced by GOI Records. Lilet's second album, (This Song's) Dedicated to You, was produced by Viva Records. Her third and fourth albums, Kahit Minsan Lang and Lilet in Bloom, both under Alpha Records, included revivals of the classic OPM songs "Tulak ng Bibig, Kabig ng Dibdib" and "Kaibigan Lang Pala".

Lilet joined That's Entertainment, and appeared in films such as Aso't Pusa, Estudyante Blues, Dear Diary and Pik Pak Boom. After a break to pursue studies in Japan, she released a comeback album with Ivory Music in 2003, under the name Marielle.

She joined A Song of Praise (ASOP) as a songwriter and her song, "You Are Lord of All", won Song of the Month in July 2014, the first one to garner a 99% score in the history of ASOP. She went on to compete in the grand finals on September 23, 2014 at the Smart Araneta Coliseum, where the song was performed by Ava Olivia Santos of Freestyle. She was invited as guest performer at the ASOP 2015 grand finals.

On August 4, 2014, Lilet guested on ABS-CBN's The Singing Bee. This started her career in TV series, the first of which was Forevermore, followed by Langit Lupa, and A Love to Last. She has a supporting role in My Special Tatay, aired on GMA Network. This marked her television comeback in her mother studio where she first started and became a popular singer in the 1980s to early '90s.

Lilet had a jam session, "A Throwback Night", with ROCKOLAROCKOLA on October 21, 2017, singing hit songs of the '80s.

She was one of the surprise guests in Coke Studio's Homecoming last September 1, 2018 at the World Trade Center, singing a mash-up of their commercial jingle together with Nikki Gil and Abra.

Lilet is currently under Cornerstone Talent Management Center, and one of the endorsers of Marie France Philippines.

== Filmography ==
=== Film ===
Year	Title	Role
1988	Pik Pak Boom	Marie / Doll
1989	Aso't Pusa	Lilian
1989	Estudyante Blues	Marilen
1989	Dear Diary	Pauline Carpio (segment: Dear Killer)
2015	Haunted Mansion	Elly
2025	Paquil	Bing
2025	One Hit Wonder	Carmen

=== Television ===
Year	Title	Role
1986–1993	That's Entertainment	Herself / Performer
1989	Goin' Bananas	Guest
1989	Ryan Ryan Musikahan	Herself / Guest Performer
2003	SOP	Herself / performer
2012	Wil Time Bigtime	Herself
2014	Mars	Guest
2014	Sunday All Stars	Herself / guest performer
2014	Sarap Diva	Guest
2014	The Singing Bee	Player
2014	Umagang Kay Ganda	Guest
2014	ASAP	Herself / guest performer
2014	Good Morning Kuya	Herself
2015	Forevermore	Bettina Rosales
2015	Biyaheng Retro	Herself
2015	Sunday PinaSaya	Herself
2015	It's Showtime	Herself
2015	Kapamilya, Deal or No Deal	Herself / player
2015	Wansapanataym: Selfie Pa More, Sasha No More	Victoria Santillan
2016	Family Feud	Herself / player
2016	Wansapanataym: Holly and Mau	Nathalie Arellano
2017	Maalaala Mo Kaya: Bituin	Lovely
2017	Langit Lupa	Teresa Principe
2017	Ipaglaban Mo: Hulidap	Nanay Linda
2017	A Love to Last	Amina Gonzales
2018	Ipaglaban Mo: Haciendero	Mrs. Calderon
2018	Wansapanataym: Gelli in a Bottle	Choleng Alcantara
2018	I Can See Your Voice	Guest star (winner)
2018	My Special Tatay	Marissa "Isay" Mariano
2018	Wowowin	Guest star
2018	Maynila: Set Up	Emerald
2018	Mars	Herself
2019	Letters and Music: Young Once Upon a Time	Season 3: host/performer
2019	Magpakailanman: Bata Bata Kriminal o Biktima	Mylene
2019	Stories for the Soul: Bad Sam	Claring
2019	Dear Uge	Herself
2019	Beautiful Justice	Marilen Bernardo
2019	Eat Bulaga!	Guest
2019	Sarap, 'Di Ba?	Guest / performer
2020	Magpakailanman: Kasal sa Funeral	Neneng
2021–2022	Himig ng Lahi: Sung Kaibigan Lang Pala	Performer
2021–2022	Niña Niño	Gloria Domingo
2022	Wish Ko Lang: Tuli	
2022	Lyric and Beat	Isay
2022	Unica Hija	Dr. Melinda Rivas
2023	Family Feud	Herself / Player
2023	Pepito Manaloto: Tuloy ang Kuwento	Barbara Montero
2024	Ang Himala ni Niño	Gloria Domingo
2025	Tadhana	Various
2026	Barangay Love Stories	Various

== Discography ==
=== Studio albums ===
- Lonely Girl (1986)
- (This Song's) Dedicated to You (1988)
- Sana Kahit Minsan Lang (1990) (gold record)
- Lilet in Bloom (1992)
- Lilet: Greatest Hits, Alpha Records
- Sa Paglisan Mo (as Marielle) (2003)

=== Compilation appearances ===
- Best of Alpha Records
- OPM Stars of the 80s

=== Songs ===
- "Sana'y Maghintay ang Walang Hanggan" (1985) – also covered by Zsa Zsa Padilla
- "Kahit Minsan Lang" (1987) – later covered by Regine Velasquez
- "Tuloy Pa Rin" (1989, Coca-Cola jingle version) – original by Neocolours; Lilet's version popularized in Coca-Cola ads
- "You Don't Have to Say You Love Me" (1980s) – cover of Dusty Springfield's 1966 hit
- "Bakit Nga Ba Mahal Kita" (1980s) – later covered by Roselle Nava
- "Sayang na Sayang" – duet with Ogie Alcasid
- "Kung Maibabalik Ko Lang" – later covered by Janno Gibbs
- "I Will Always Love You" (live performances) – cover of Dolly Parton's 1974 song, popularized by Whitney Houston
