= Bing Davao =

Filipino actor (died 2025)

- Born: Chaeles Vincent Abriera Davao Jr. June 19, 1960
- Died: December 20, 2025 (aged 65); Taguig, Metro Manila, Philippines
- Occupation: Actor
- Father: Charlie Davao

Chaeles Vincent "Bing" Davao Jr. (1959/1960 – December 20, 2025) was a Filipino actor.

== Early life ==
Chaeles Vincent Davao Jr. was born around 1959 or 1960. He was the eldest of four children of actor Charlie Davao, and educator Emma Marie. The four children also had a stepbrother.

== Career ==
Bing Davao appeared in films such as Matinik na Kalaban; and Soltero (1984) Joe Pring: Homicide, Manila Police (1989), Kalawang sa Bakal (1990), Kahit Butas Ng Karayom... Papasukin Ko (1995), Felix Manalo (2015).

His television credits include Maalaala Mo Kaya, Pangako Sa 'Yo, Ang Probinsyano, Victor Magtanggol, Darna.

Davao expressed intention to restart his career in a November 13, 2025 vlog of Julius Babao recalling on how Coco Martin offered his brother Ricky a job opportunity. The older Davao who assesed that he is already in his "last chapter" of his life said he intends to take the role in his now deceased brother's stead.

== Personal life ==
Davao was a convert to Islam, and practiced the religion in his last 20 years of his life.

In 2008, Davao was convicted of drug possession after he along with three others were arrested for methamphetamine usage a year ago.

== Filmography ==
=== Film ===
Year	Title	Role	Note(s)	Ref(s).
1981	Bertong Barako			
1984	Matinik Na Kalaban			
1984	Soltero	Edwin		
1985	Paradise Inn			
1988	Target: Maganto	Ka Bing		
1988	Alega Gang: Public Enemy No.1 of Cebu	Alega Gang member		
1988	Kumander Dante			
1988	Iyo ang Batas, Akin ang Katarungan	Atty. Tablante		
1988	Babaing Hampaslupa	Crispin		
1989	Isang Bala, Isang Buhay	Ex-commando		
1989	Carnap King? (The Randy Padilla Story)			
1989	Joe Pring: Homicide, Manila Police			
1990	Kalawang sa Bakal		Credited as Leon "Bing" Davao	
1991	Anak ng Dagat			
1992	Ipaglaban Mo Ako, Boy Topak			
1995	Kahit Butas ng Karayom, Papasukin Ko			
1996	Utol	Rommel		
1996	Ben Balasador: Akin ang Huling Alas	Arturo		
1996	Labanang Lalaki	Gardo		
1999	Markado			

== Death ==
Davao died on December 20, 2025 at the Taguig-Pateros District Hospital in Taguig due to cardiac arrest. He experienced breathing difficulties at home and was rushed to the Taguig-Pateros District Hospital, where he could not be revived.
