= Rose Ann Gonzales =

Filipina former child actress

Rose Ann Gonzales is a Filipina award-winning former child actress. She was popularly active in the 1980s along with other child stars of the era like Bamba, Lady Lee, RR Herrera, Chuckie Dreyfus, Jaypee de Guzman, Glaiza Herradura, Matet de Leon and Aiza Seguerra.

== Career ==
Gonzales won the 1985 FAMAS Award for Best Child Actress in the film Kriminal and the 1987 Film Academy of the Philippines Award for Best Child Performer in the film Lumuhod Ka sa Lupa! She starred alongside Rudy Fernandez in both films.

Gonzales appeared in several movies such as Kriminal (1984); Muntinlupa (1984) with Anthony Alonzo and Marianne dela Riva; God Save Me! (1985) with Christopher de Leon; Send in the Clowns (1986) with Tito Sotto, Vic Sotto and Joey de Leon; Lumuhod Ka Sa Lupa! (1986); Pepe Saclao (1986) with Ramon Revilla; Family Tree (1987) with Nida Blanca and Luis Gonzales; Mga Anak ni Facifica Falayfay (1987) starring Dolphy; Binibining Tsuper-Man (1987) with Roderick Paulate; and Fly Me To The Moon (1988) with Tito Sotto, Vic Sotto and Joey de Leon, among others.

== Filmography ==
=== Film ===
- Kriminal (1984)
- Muntinlupa (1984)
- Public Enemy No. 2: Maraming Number Two (1985)
- Baun Gang (1985)
- The Sangley Point Robbery (1985)
- God Save Me! (1985)
- Send in the Clowns (1986)
- Lumuhod Ka sa Lupa! (1986)
- Pepe Saclao: Public Enemy No. 1 (1986)
- Captain Barbell (1986)
- Family Tree (1987)
- Kapitan Pablo: Cavite Killing Fields (1987)
- Bloody Mary, The Movie (1987)
- Mga Anak ni Facifica Falayfay (1987)
- Ako si Kiko, Ako si Kikay (1987)
- Binibining Tsuper-Man (1987)
- Black Magic (1987)
- Kumander Gringa (1987)
- Fly Me to the Moon (1988)
- Nasaan Ka Inay? (1988)
- Lost Command (1988)
- Love Letters (1988)
- Lorenzo Ruiz: The Saint... A Filipino (1988)
- Langit at Lupa (1988)
- Pepeng Kuryente: Man with a Thousand Volts (1988)
- Moises Platon (1989)
- Everlasting Love (1989)
- Jones Bridge Massacre (Task Force Clabio) (1989)

=== Television ===
- That's Entertainment (1993/1996)

== Awards and nominations ==
Year	Award-giving body	Category	Work nominated	Result	Ref.
1985	FAMAS Awards	Best Child Actress	Kriminal	Won	
1987	Film Academy of the Philippines Awards	Best Child Performer	Lumuhod Ka sa Lupa	Won	
1987	FAMAS Awards	Best Child Actress	Lumuhod Ka sa Lupa	Nominated	
1988	FAMAS Awards	Best Child Actress	Mga Anak ni Facifica Falayfay	Nominated	
1989	FAMAS Awards	Best Child Actress	Lost Command	Nominated	
