= 1989 FAMAS Awards =

37th edition of Filipino movie awards

37th FAMAS Awards
- Date: May 6, 1989
- Site: Westin Philippine Plaza Grand Ballroom, Pasay, Philippines
- Hosted by: Chat Silayan; Roy Alvarez

Highlights
- Best Picture: Ibulong Mo sa Diyos; Comedy: Enteng the Dragon; Action: Chinatown: Sa Kuko ng Dragon
- Most awards: Ibulong Mo sa Diyos (6 wins)

The 37th FAMAS Awards Ceremony presented by the Filipino Academy of Movie Arts and Sciences, honored the best in Filipino film for 1988.

For the first time in the history of FAMAS, the Best Picture was divided into three categories. Best Picture, Best Comedy Picture and Best Action Picture. Ibulong Mo sa Diyos won for the drama category, Enteng the Dragon for comedy and Chinatown: Sa Kuko ng Dragon for Action. On the other hand, Vilma Santos won her fifth Famas Best Actress Award.

== Awards ==
=== Major ===
Winners are listed first and highlighted with boldface.

Best Picture	Best Comedy Picture
**Ibulong Mo sa Diyos – Regal Films**; Celestina Sanchez, Alyas Bubbles – Enforcer: Ativan Gang – Golden Lions Films; Huwag Mong Itanong Kung Bakit – Viva Films; Lorenzo Ruiz: The Saint... A Filipino – RJ Films; Magkano ang Iyong Dangal? – Seiko Films; Nagbabagang Luha – Regal Films; Paano Tatakasan ang Bukas? – Viva Films	**Enteng the Dragon – RVQ Films**; Jack and Jill sa Amerika – Viva Films; Jockey Tyan – RNB Films; Pik Pak Boom – Viva Films; Sheman: Mistress of the Universe – Viva Films; Wake Up Little Susie – Regal Films
Best Action Picture	Best Director
**Chinatown: Sa Kuko ng Dragon – Four-N Films**; Agila ng Maynila – FPJ Productions; Anak ng Cabron – Urban Films; Boy Negro – Viva Films; Kumander Dante – Cine Suerte Inc.; Sandakot Na Bala – Regal Films; Tubusin Mo ng Bala – Bonanza Films	**Elwood Perez – Ibulong Mo sa Diyos**; Carlo J. Caparas – Celestina Sanchez, Alyas Bubbles – Enforcer: Ativan Gang; Eddie Garcia – Huwag Mong Itanong Kung Bakit; Maria Saret – Lorenzo Ruiz: The Saint... A Filipino; Laurice Guillen – Magkano ang Iyong Dangal?; Ishmael Bernal – Nagbabagang Luha; Emmanuel H. Borlaza – Paano Tatakasan ang Bukas?
Best Actor	Best Actress
**Christopher de Leon – Kapag Napagod ang Puso as Adrian**; Ace Vergel – Anak ng Cabron as Donato Rios; Phillip Salvador – Boy Negro as Boy Negro; Ramon Revilla, Jr. – Chinatown: Sa Kuko ng Dragon as Daniel Moreno; Ricky Davao – Huwag Mong Itanong Kung Bakit; Mat Ranillo III – Lorenzo Ruiz: The Saint... A Filipino as Lorenzo Ruiz; Rudy Fernandez – Sandakot Na Bala as Emil	**Vilma Santos – Ibulong Mo sa Diyos as Monica Quijano**; Maricel Soriano – Babaing Hampaslupa as Remedios; Amy Austria – Celestina Sanchez, Alyas Bubbles – Enforcer: Ativan Gang as Celestina "Bubbles" Sanchez; Jacklyn Jose – Itanong Mo sa Buwan; Snooky Serna – Kapag Napagod ang Puso as Rosalie; Lorna Tolentino – Nagbabagang Luha as Maria Teresa "Maita" Zaragosa; Dina Bonnevie – Paano Tatakasan ang Bukas
Best Supporting Actor	Best Supporting Actress
**Miguel Rodriguez – Ibulong Mo sa Diyos as Mario Umali**; Ernie Garcia – Bukas Sisikat Din ang Araw; Paquito Diaz – Kumander Dante; Joel Torre – Magkano ang Iyong Dangal? as Larry; Dante Rivero – Natutulog Pa ang Diyos as Bernardo Ramirez; Dick Israel – Patrolman	**Gloria Romero – Nagbabagang Luha as Imelda Montaire**; Perla Bautista – Anak ng Cabron; Gina Alajar – Babaing Hampaslupa as Desiree; Armida Siguion-Reyna – Hati Tayo sa Magdamag as Doña Concha Revilla; Nida Blanca – Ibulong Mo sa Diyos as Nelia Quijano; Gina Pareño – Natutulog Pa ang Diyos as Patria Ramirez; Marissa Delgado – Sa Akin Pa Rin ang Bukas
Best Child Actor	Best Child Actress
**Vandolph – Enteng the Dragon as Kuto**; R.R. Herrera – Agila ng Maynila as Pepe; Joko Diaz – Boy Negro as Young Boy Negro; Christopher Paloma— Chinatown: Sa Kuko ng Dragon; Elvis Gutierrez – Joaquin Burdado; Alvin Enriquez – Lorenzo Ruiz: The Saint... A Filipino; Billy Joe Crawford – Sandakot Na Bala as Jun Jun	**Matet de Leon – One Day, Isang Araw as Precious/Purunggay**; Glaiza Herradura – Afuang: Bounty Hunter; Judy Ann Santos – Sa Akin Pa Rin ang Bukas; Honey Mae Ledesma – Nagbabagang Luha as Teresa "Yeye" Montaire; Sunshine – Patrolman; Aiza Seguerra – Wake Up Little Susie as Susie Seguerra
Best Screenplay	Best Story
**Pablo S. Gomez — Agila ng Maynila**; Orlando R. Nadres — Ibulong Mo sa Diyos; Racquel Villavicencio — Nagbabagang Luha; Serge Custodio Jr. — Lorenzo Ruiz: The Saint... A Filipino; Jake Tordesillas — Kapag Napagod ang Puso; Ricky Lee – Sandakot Na Bala; Gina Marissa Tagasa – Huwag Mong Itanong Kung Bakit	**Carlo J. Caparas – Sandakot Na Bala**; Orlando R. Nadres — Ibulong Mo sa Diyos; Elena Patron — Nagbabagang Luha; Fr. Fidel Villarroel — Lorenzo Ruiz: The Saint... A Filipino; VIA Hoffman — Kapag Napagod ang Puso; Nards Sangalang and Ronwaldo Reyes — Agila ng Maynila; Gilda Olvidado – Huwag Mong Itanong Kung Bakit
Best Cinematography	Best Editing
**Ricardo Jacinto – Ibulong Mo sa Diyos**; Joe Batac Jr. – Kumander Dante; Popoy Orense – Lorenzo Ruiz: The Saint... A Filipino; Ely Cruz – Kapag Napagod ang Puso; Ver Reyes – Agila ng Maynila; Ding Austria – Langit at Lupa; Baby Cabrales – Chinatown: Sa Kuko ng Dragon	**George Jarlego – Ibulong Mo sa Diyos**; Abelardo Fulleza – Lorenzo Ruiz: The Saint... A Filipino; Edgardo Vinarao – Kapag Napagod ang Puso; Gervacio Santos – Chinatown: Sa Kuko ng Dragon; Tony Sy – Patrolman; Ike Jarlego Jr. – Afuang: Bounty Hunter; Jess Navarro – Huwag Mong Itanong Kung Bakit
Best Sound	Best Music
**Rolly Ruta – Chinatown: Sa Kuko ng Dragon**; Joe Climaco – Ibulong Mo sa Diyos; Albert Rima – Lorenzo Ruiz: The Saint... A Filipino; Vic Macamay – Kapag Napagod ang Puso; Gabby Castillan – Patrolman; Gaudencio Barredo – Ompong Galapong: May Ulo, Walang Tapon; Willie Islao – Celestina Sanchez, Alyas Bubbles – Enforcer: Ativan Gang	**Willie Cruz – Nagbabagang Luha**; Jaime Fabregas – Ibulong Mo sa Diyos; Mon del Rosario – Kapag Napagod ang Puso; Nonoy Tan – Chinatown: Sa Kuko ng Dragon; Lutgardo Labad – Kumander Dante; Rey Valera – Ompong Galapong: May Ulo, Walang Tapon; Demet Velasquez – Celestina Sanchez, Alyas Bubbles – Enforcer: Ativan Gang
Best Song	Art Direction
**Gary Valenciano – Ibulong Mo sa Diyos**	**Ray Maliuanag – Ibulong Mo sa Diyos**
