= Lito Pimentel =

Filipino actor

- Born: Joselito Pimentel; May 27, 1963 (age 63); General Tinio, Nueva Ecija, Philippines
- Occupations: Film and TV actor
- Years active: 1982–present
- Height: 1.78 m (5 ft 10 in)
- Spouse: Ma. Chrysantine Pimentel

Joselito "Lito" Pimentel (born May 27, 1963), is a Filipino film and television actor. He is the nephew of the late game show host Pepe Pimentel.

== Early life and career ==
Pimentel's career began in the early 1980s when talent manager and entertainment columnist Alfie Lorenzo discovered and added him to Lorenzo's stable of talents, The Liberty Boys.

Pimentel appeared in films such as Moral (1982) starring Lorna Tolentino, Broken Marriage (1983) starring Vilma Santos, Clarizza (1986) with Sarsi Emmanuelle, Lord, Bakit Ako Pa? (1988) starring Snooky Serna, and Lover's Delight (1990) with Alma Moreno and Joey Marquez.

From being a character actor, Pimentel transitioned into TV hosting via the GMA Network noontime show Lunch Date in 1988. He won over a mass fan base with his comic timing and street-smart approach. In 1991, he left the show for another hosting gig in the Sunday game show Family Kuwarta o Kahon where he got to work with his uncle Pepe Pimentel.

He won the Best Supporting Actor Gawad Urian Award for the film Kapag Napagod ang Puso (1988).

== Personal life ==
Pimentel is married to a businesswoman. In 2004, Pimentel was charged with frustrated parricide after allegedly stabbing his wife.

== Filmography ==
=== Film ===
Year	Title	Role	Ref.
1982	Dormitoryo, Buhay Estudyante	Da Desirabulls	
1982	Schoolgirls	Egoy's friend (uncredited)	
1982	Hindi Kita Malimot	Stephen	
1982	Moral	Celso	
1983	Summer Holiday		
1983	Broken Marriage	Boying	
1984	Erpat Kong Forgets		
1984	Uhaw sa Pag-ibig		
1984	Sex Education		
1984	The Punks		
1984	Mga Ibong Pipit		
1984	Bigats		
1984	Makakating Hayop		
1985	Sanay	Luis	
1985	Mga Paru-parong Buking	Jimmy	
1985	Miguelito: Batang Rebelde	Chino	
1985	Climax		
1986	Clarizza		
1986	John & Marsha '86: TNT sa Amerika		
1986	Pipo's Power		
1986	Gabi Na, Kumander	Kampay	
1987	Tagos ng Dugo	Levie	
1987	Kalabaw Lang ang Tumatanda		
1988	Stupid Cupid	Samson	
1988	Kapag Napagod ang Puso		
1988	Lord, Bakit Ako Pa?		
1989	Engkantadang Kangkarot en Her Magic Talong		
1989	Huminga Ka Na Hangga't Gusto Mo		
1990	Flavor of the Month		
1990	Bala at Rosaryo		
1990	Lover's Delight	Agie	
1991	Noel Juico, 16: Batang Kriminal		
1992	Buddy en Sol: Praybeyt Depektibs		
1993	Kahit Ako'y Busabos	Piklat	
1995	Sa Ngalan ng Pag-ibig		
1996	Virgin Island		
1996	Room for Rent	Rey	
1997	Lahar: Paraisong Abo	Mr. Punzalan	
1997	Computer Kombat	Entong	
1997	Calvento Files: The Movie	Tecson	
1997	Bawal Mahalin, Bawal Ibigin	Ramon	
1997	Wanted Perfect Murder	Goon 1	
1997	Kulayan Natin ang Bukas	Dennis	
2000	Daddy O, Baby O!	Arnold	
2003	Noon at Ngayon: Pagsasamang Kay Ganda	Celso	
2005	Awaken	Lakay	
2006	All About Love	Bogart	
2006	You Are the One	Sally's boss	
2008	My Big Love	Oca	
2010	Rosario	Court clerk	
2012	The Reunion	Temyo dela Torre	
2013	On the Job	Pol	
2014	Sa Ngalan ng Ama, Ina, at mga Anak	Major Calaang	
2014	Starting Over Again	Ginny's father	
2014	Da Possessed	Anding Villamayor	
2015	You're Still the One	Eric	
2016	How to Be Yours	Niño's dad	
2017	Can't Help Falling in Love	Papa Jun	
2018	Sin Island	Alejandro	
2018	Cry No Fear		
2019	Hello, Love, Goodbye	Mario Del Rosario	
2023	Rewind	Nestor	
2024	Hello, Love, Again	Mario del Rosario	

=== Television ===
Year	Title	Role	Ref.
1987–1990	Ang Manok ni San Pedro	Esteban Escuderro	
1988–1991	Lunch Date	Himself (host)	
1991–1993	Family Kuwarta o Kahon	Himself (host)	
1993	Ipaglaban Mo!		
1995	Familia Zaragoza	Raul	
1997	Maalaala Mo Kaya: Agiw	Elias	
2000–2001	Marinella	Federico Villareal	
2001	Sa Puso Ko Iingatan Ka	Arsing Dela Cruz	
2002	Maalaala Mo Kaya: Suman at Ketchup	Tonyo	
2003	Basta't Kasama Kita	Adan K. Abordo	
2004	Spirits	Jose	
2006	Gulong ng Palad	David	
2006	Maalaala Mo Kaya: Bus	Fred Suarez	
2006	Komiks Presents: Da Adventures of Pedro Penduko	Guest	
2007	Maalaala Mo Kaya: Cellphone	Abel	
2007	Ysabella	Homer	
2008	Maalaala Mo Kaya: Sopas	Rex	
2008	My Girl	Chito Estocapio	
2009	Komiks Presents: Flash Bomba	Enrico Legazpi	
2009	Maalaala Mo Kaya: Taxi	Guest	
2009–2010	May Bukas Pa	Fr. Gregorio "Ringo"	
2010	Elena M. Patron's Momay	Mickey Alonzo	
2010	Maalaala Mo Kaya: Pagkain	Lito	
2010	Pablo S. Gomez's Juanita Banana	Val Villa	
2011	Guns and Roses	Rico Bartolome	
2011	Wansapanataym: Apir Disapir	Isko	
2011	Maalaala Mo Kaya: Siomai	Larry	
2011–2012	Reputasyon	Jose Delos Santos	
2012	Wansapanataym: Sandy and the Super Sandok	Kap	
2012	Wansapanataym: Wansapana-Ride	Daddy	
2012	Maalaala Mo Kaya: Journal	Daddy	
2012	Maalaala Mo Kaya: Bangka	Papa	
2012	Maalaala Mo Kaya: Bangkang Papel	Lito	
2012	Kahit Puso'y Masugatan	Antonio "Tony" Espiritu	
2012	A Beautiful Affair	Rex Resureccion	
2013	Wansapanataym: No Read No Write Nomar	Alchemist	
2013	Maalaala Mo Kaya: Kamison	Gimo	
2013	Maalaala Mo Kaya: Walis	Jose	
2013	Kailangan Ko'y Ikaw	Nestor Dagohoy	
2013	Carlo J. Caparas' Dugong Buhay	Pablo De Guzman	
2013	Huwag Ka Lang Mawawala	Dario Panaligan	
2013	Juan dela Cruz	Victor	
2013	Maalaala Mo Kaya: Singsing	Roger Canlas	
2013–2014	Be Careful with My Heart	Arturo Dela Rosa	
2014	Ipaglaban Mo: Paano Na ang Pangarap?	Mang Mario	
2015	Bridges of Love	Manuel Nakpil	
2015	Ipaglaban Mo: Pagkakasala Ng Ama	Tatay Arman	
2016	Tubig at Langis	Dominador "Domeng" Magdangal	
2016–2017	Magpahanggang Wakas	Nicolas "Kulas" Del Mar	
2017	Maalaala Mo Kaya: Red Watch	James	
2017	FPJ's Ang Probinsyano	young Domingo Bulaon	
2018	Asintado	Vicente Dimasalang	
2018	Bagani	Alab	
2018	Sana Dalawa ang Puso	Leader Rizal	
2018	Maalaala Mo Kaya: Kalabaw	Gaudencio	
2018–2019	Precious Hearts Romances Presents: Los Bastardos	Menandro "Manding" Silverio	
2019	Maalaala Mo Kaya: Pregnancy Test		
2019	Ipaglaban Mo: Bagong Salta	Mario	
2019	Tadhana: Yaya CEO	Pedring	
2019	Maalaala Mo Kaya: Bukid	Weni	
2020	A Soldier's Heart	Yosef Alhuraji	
2020	Bella Bandida	Emmanuel Barbaro	
2020	Ang sa Iyo ay Akin	Jorge Ceñidoza	
2021	Maalaala Mo Kaya: Bigas	Arong	
2021	Maalaala Mo Kaya: Titulo	Arong	
2021–2022	Marry Me, Marry You	Victor Zamora	
2022	A Family Affair	Apolinario "Panyong" Magwayen†	
2022	Mars Ravelo's Darna	Florentino Ibarra	
2022	Bola Bola	Ricardo Balderama	
2022	Lyric and Beat	Jeff	
2023	Hearts on Ice	Ruben Martinez	
2023	Cattleya Killer	Randolph	
2023	Minsan pa Nating Hagkan ang Nakaraan	Tonyo Bautista	
2023	Love Before Sunrise	Artemio Menandrez	
2023–2024	Nag-aapoy na Damdamin	Jus. Napoleon Avecilla	
2024	Wish Ko Lang: Sadista	Fernando	
2024–2025	Widows' War	Amando Namas	
2025	Mommy Dearest	Ador	
2026	House of Lies	Greg Torrecampo	
2026	Magpakailanman: The Prodigal Priest: The Bienvenido Salinas Jr. Story	Father Gabriel	

== Accolades ==
Year	Award	Category	Work	Result
1988	Gawad Urian Award	Best Supporting Actor	Kapag Napagod ang Puso	Won
