= Mga Anak ni Facifica Falayfay =

Facifica Falayfay
- Directed by: Romy S. Villaflor
- Screenplay by: Tony S. Mortel
- Story by: Tony S. Mortel; Roy Vera Cruz; Garry Garcia
- Based on: Facifica Falayfay by Mars Ravelo
- Produced by: Rodolfo V. Quizon
- Starring: Dolphy
- Cinematography: Arnold Alvaro
- Edited by: Efren Jarlego
- Music by: Danny Tan
- Production company: RVQ Productions
- Release date: July 31, 1987
- Country: Philippines
- Language: Filipino

Mga Anak ni Facifica Falayfay (transl. Facifica Falayfay's Children) is a 1987 Filipino film that is a sequel to the 1969 movie Facifica Falayfay starring Dolphy. It was written by Tony Mortel and Roy Vera Cruz and directed by Romy Villaflor.

The movies tell the story of a lovable gay character created by Mars Ravelo in his series of comic book stories. The sequel picks up Facifica Falayfay's story after he falls in love with Ligaya at the end of the first movie.

Zsa Zsa Padilla was introduced in the movie, and was referred to as Ligaya's (Pilar Pilapil) look-alike and his new leading lady.

== Plot ==
After Facifica (Dolphy) straightens his sexual preference and becomes a straight man, he reverts to his old name Pacifico and becomes a doting husband to Ligaya (Pilar Pilapil) and a generous father to his three sons played by Eric (Eric Quizon), Rolando "Rolly" (Rolly Quizon), and Rodrigo (Roderick Paulate). Unfortunately, after Ligaya dies Rodrigo is affected so much that later on he finds out he is more female at heart than his brothers. Rodrigo has come to terms with his homosexuality and tries to gain acceptance from his father.

Cristina (Zsa Zsa Padilla) marries Pacifico. Rodrigo finds out that his father used to be gay even though Facifica refuses to admit it. Facifica eventually comes to terms with his son's sexuality.

== Cast ==
- Dolphy as PCpl. Pacifico Manalastas/Facifica Falayfay
- Roderick Paulate as Rodrigo Manalastas
- Zsa Zsa Padilla as Cristina Mendoza
- Rolly Quizon as Rolly Manalastas
- Eric Quizon as Eric Manalastas
- Panchito as Sgt. Tamboyong
- Babalu as Chief Acosta
- Bayani Casimiro as Mayor
- Lotlot De Leon
- Charlie Davao
- Rose Ann Gonzales

== Awards and nominations ==
| Award-giving body | Category | Recipient | Result |
|---|---|---|---|
| 1988 FAMAS Awards | Best Child Actress | Rose Ann Gonzales | Nominated |

== See also ==
- Facifica Falayfay
