= Bomber Moran =

Filipino actor (1944–2004)

- Born: Arturo Ocampo; October 18, 1944; Manila, Commonwealth of the Philippines
- Died: August 14, 2004 (aged 59); San Francisco, California, United States
- Other names: Bomber
- Occupation: Actor
- Years active: 1961–2001
- Known for: The "Bud Spencer" of the Philippines
- Spouse: Erlina Ocampo
- Children: 2

Bomber Moran (born Arturo Ocampo; October 18, 1944 – August 14, 2004) was a Filipino actor noted for his starring roles in action movies.

== Life and career ==
Moran was born in Manila, Philippines on October 18, 1944. During his career he acted in over 400 movies, often portraying "mean tough guy" characters. He was married to Erlinda Ocampo and had two children; Ramon and Sarah. he ran once as a councilor in District 2 of Mandaluyong City during the mid-90s, but lost.

He died at his home in San Francisco, California, on August 14, 2004. His cause of death was non-communicable disease.

== Filmography ==
=== Film ===
Year	Title	Role	Notes
1961	Ikaw o Ako		
1973	Black Mama, White Mama	Vic Cheng's Goon	
1974	Ang Pagbabalik ni Leon Guerrero		
1975	Dugo at Pag-ibig sa Kapirasong lupa	Vicente's Bodyguard	(segment 4), Uncredited
1978	Facundo Alitaftaf		
1978	Doble Kara		
1978	Boy Apache		
1978	Atsay	Nonong	
1979	Teritoryo ko ito	Baby Face's Gang	
1979	Batang salabusab		
1979	Chopstick Kid		
1980	Dolphy's Angels		
1980	Kosa		
1980	Siga		
1980	Tres kantos		
1980	Ang pagbabalik ni Leon Guerrero		
1980	Estibador	Turo Pusakal	
1980	Brusko		
1981	Palpak Connection		
1981	Geronimo		
1981	Pepeng Shotgun	Tommy's Man	
1981	Bulldog		
1981	Cuadro de Alas		
1981	Hepe Goes to War		
1981	San Basililo		
1981	Panlaban: Dos por Dos		
1981	Ikaw o ako		
1981	Tatlong Baraha	Haring Copas	
1982	Juan Balutan		
1982	Estranghero		
1982	Alias Django		
1982	Sgt. Pork & Capt. Beans		
1982	Ito ang Lalake		
1982	Tokwa't Baboy		
1982	Man to Man		
1982	Pretty Boy Tsaplin and the 3 Istodyes		
1983	Par de Jack		
1983	Buhay Misis		
1983	Commandos		
1983	Babae Ikaw Ba'y Makasalanan?		
1983	Pieta	Don Jose's Henchman	
1983	Over My Dead Body	Luan	
1983	Bad Bananas sa Puting Tabing	Bar Goon	
1984	Zigomar		
1984	Donato Akakdang Bato		
1984	Mga Walang Daigdig		
1984	Basag ang Pula	Diego	
1984	Somewhere	Bino	
1984	Kumander Cobra		
1984	Charot		
1984	Idol		
1985	Sloane		
1985	Working Boys	Hostage Taker	
1985	Anino ni David Crusado		
1985	Ulo ng Gapo		
1985	Ben Tumbling: A People's Journal Story	Kabo	
1985	Bilang Na ang Oras Mo		
1985	Hari ng Gatilyo		
1985	Order to Kill		
1985	Jandro Nakpil: Halang ang Kaluluwa		
1985	Swak		
1985	The Sangley Point Robbery	Ambo	
1985	Partida		
1985	Paradise Inn		
1985	Boboy Tibayan: Tigre ng Cavite		
1985	Rustico Acuzar: Waray		
1986	Batang Quiapo	Rading	
1986	Kamagong	Taber	
1986	Horsey-Horsey: Tigidig-Tigidig	Bruno	
1986	Ninja Kids	Hostage Taker	
1986	Laban kung Laban		
1986	Super Islaw and the Flying Kids	Kapitan Barang	
1986	Bodyguard: Masyong Bagwisa Jr.	Goon	
1986	Asong Gubat		
1986	Cobrador		
1986	The Buelta Force		
1987	'Di Bale Na Lang!		
1987	Target: Sparrow Unit		
1987	Ready!.. Aim!.. Fire!..	Hijacker	
1987	Family Tree	Teryo	
1988	Kambal Tuko	Boy Macho	
1988	Ex-Army	Eming	
1988	Alega Gang: Public Enemy No.1 of Cebu	Logan	
1988	Kambal Na Kamao: Madugong Engkwentro		
1988	Super Inday and the Golden Bibe		
1988	Strike Commando 2	Hog	Uncredited
1988	Ompong Galapong: May Ulo, Walang Tapon		
1988	Kumander Dante		
1988	Sheman: Mistress of the Universe	Kutchero	
1988	Sandakot Na Bala	Hired guns	
1988	Pepeng Kuryente: Man with a Thousand Volts	Lucas	
1988	Kahit Ako'y Tupang Itim, May Langit Rin	Dona Mary	
1988	Chinatown: Sa Kuko ng Dragon		
1988	One Two Bato, Three Four Bapor		
1989	Starzan: Shouting Star of the Jungle	Chief Raprap	
1989	Si Malakas at si Maganda	Raymond	
1989	Alex Boncayao Brigade: The Liquidation Arm of the NPA		
1989	Sgt. Niñonuevo: The Fastest Gun Alive of WPD	Sgt. Geronimo Santos	
1989	Florencio Diño Public Enemy No. 1 of Caloocan		
1989	Eagle Squad		
1989	Moises Platon		
1989	Long Ranger and TonTon (Shooting Stars of the West)	Viva Zapanta	
1989	Starzan II: The Coming of the Star Son		
1989	Sa Kuko ng Agila		
1989	Limang Daliri ng Diyos		
1989	SuperMouse and the Robo-Rats	Pendong's Goon	
1989	My Darling Domestik		
1989	Ang Mahiwagang Daigdig ni Elias Paniki	Totoy Sipa	
1990	Barumbado		
1990	Ayaw Matulog ng Gabi		
1990	David Balondo ng Tondo	Lontoc's Man	
1990	Walang Awa Kung Pumatay		
1990	Karapatan Ko ang Pumatay, Kapitan Guti		
1990	Alyas Pogi: Birador ng Nueva Ecija	Epe	
1990	May Araw Ka Rin Bagallon		
1991	Leon ng Maynila: P/Col. Romeo B. Maganto, WPD-MPFF	Jim / Beltran	
1991	Alyas Batman en Robin		
1991	Goosebuster	Captain Robert de Niro	
1991	Bingbong: The Vincent Crisologo Story		
1992	Kamay ni Cain		
1992	Aguila at Guerrero: Droga Terminators	Pete Dimaguiba	
1992	Alyas Joker: Sigue-Sigue 22 Commando		
1992	Alyas Pogi 2	Kardong Kalabaw	
1992	Gobernador	Abando	
1992	Bad Boy II		
1992	Alyas Ninong: Huling Kilabot ng Tondo	Dagul	
1993	Gascon... bala ang katapat mo		
1993	Beloy Montemayor Jr.: Tirador ng Cebu	Tirso's Men	
1993	Makuha Ka sa Tingin	Don Ricardo's Men	
1993	Kahit ako'y busabos		
1993	Victor Meneses: Dugong Kriminal	Antonio	
1993	Manila Boy		
1993	Humanda Ka Mayor!: Bahala Na ang Diyos	Badong	
1993	Di Na Natuto: Sorry Na, Puwede Ba?		
1993	Task Force Habagat		
1993	Ano Ba Yan 2		
Alih	Mistah	1994	
1994	Tasya Fantasia		
1994	Ismael Zacarias	Don Pablo's Man	
1994	Silya elektrika	Sgt. Lizardo's Men	
1994	Oo Na, Sige Na!	Bodyguard of Don Perfecto	
1995	Rodolfo 'Boy' Fuentes: Libingan ng mga buhay		
1995	Lt. Rolito Reynoso: Mahirap patayin		
1995	Iligpit si Bobby Ortega: Markang bungo 2		
1995	Batas ang katapat mo		
1996	Kristo	Herodian Guard	
1996	Ang Syota Kong Balikbayan		
1996	Rubberman	Bobo	
1998	Alex Boncayao Brigade: The Liquidation Arm of the NPA		
1999	D'Sisters: Nuns of the Above	Rodman	
1999	Basta't Ikaw, Nanginginig Pa!		
2000	Leon ng Maynila: Lt. Col. Romeo Maganto		
2000	Makamandag Na Bala	Ato	
2001	Iligpit si Bobby Ortega: Markang Bungo 2		
