= Kapag Napagod ang Puso =

1988 romantic drama film by Maryo J. de los Reyes

- Directed by: Maryo J. de los Reyes
- Screenplay by: Jake Tordesillas
- Story by: Via Hoffman
- Produced by: Babes Marquez
- Starring: Christopher de Leon; Snooky Serna; Gloria Romero
- Cinematography: Ely Cruz
- Edited by: Edgardo Vinarao
- Music by: Mon del Rosario
- Production company: VH Films
- Release date: June 30, 1988
- Country: Philippines
- Language: Filipino

Kapag Napagod ang Puso (lit. 'When the Heart Tires') is a 1988 Filipino romantic drama film directed by Maryo J. de los Reyes and starring Christopher de Leon, Snooky Serna, Gloria Romero, Lito Pimentel, Julio Diaz, Rez Cortez, Anjo Yllana, Caridad Sanchez, and Gil de Leon. Produced by VH Films, it was released on June 30, 1988.

The film received critical acclaim, with Lav Diaz praising its focus on the issue of domestic violence and Christopher de Leon's performance. It was nominated for nine FAMAS Awards, winning Best Actor for de Leon.

== Cast ==
- Christopher de Leon as Adrian
- Snooky Serna as Rosalie
- Gloria Romero
- Lito Pimentel
- Julio Diaz
- Rez Cortez
- Anjo Yllana
- Caridad Sanchez
- Gil de Leon

== Release ==
Kapag Napagod ang Puso was graded "B" by the Movie and Television Review and Classification Board (MTRCB), indicating a "Good" quality, and was released in June 1988.

=== Critical response ===
Mario Hernando, a critic from the television program Movie Magazine, gave the film five out of five stars. Critic Joel David, writing for National Midweek, gave the film praise for its use of improvisation, stating that "The acting in Kapag Napagod will definitely not pass today’s textbook tests – yet its most powerful moments exceed anything done in recent memory." Lav Diaz, writing for the Manila Standard, gave the film a positive review, praising its focus on the issue of domestic violence. He also gave high praise to de Leon's complex performance as Adrian, stating that the film was "another big step of Christopher de Leon [...] toward greatness in the art of acting."

== Accolades ==
Group	Category	Name	Result
FAMAS Awards	Best Actor	Christopher de Leon	Won
FAMAS Awards	Best Actress	Snooky Serna	Nominated
FAMAS Awards	Best Screenplay	Jake Tordesillas	Nominated
FAMAS Awards	Best Story	VIA Hoffman	Nominated
FAMAS Awards	Best Cinematography	Ely Cruz	Nominated
FAMAS Awards	Best Editing	Edgardo Vinarao	Nominated
FAMAS Awards	Best Sound	Vic Macamay	Nominated
FAMAS Awards	Best Music	Mon del Rosario	Nominated
FAMAS Awards	Best Song	"Kapag Napagod ang Puso" by Mon del Rosario	Nominated
PMPC Star Awards for Movies	Best Actor	Christopher de Leon	Nominated
PMPC Star Awards for Movies	Best Actress	Snooky Serna	Nominated
PMPC Star Awards for Movies	Best Supporting Actor	Lito Pimentel	Nominated
PMPC Star Awards for Movies	Best Supporting Actress	Caridad Sanchez	Nominated
