= Humanda Ka Mayor!: Bahala Na ang Diyos =

- Directed by: Carlo J. Caparas
- Written by: Carlo J. Caparas; Gigi Javier Alfonso; Efren Montano
- Produced by: Roselle Y. Monteverde
- Starring: Aga Muhlach; Kris Aquino; Dick Israel; Sunshine Cruz; Jeffrey Santos
- Cinematography: Ernesto "Boy" Dominguez
- Edited by: Abelardo "Dho" Hulleza
- Music by: Rey Ramos
- Production companies: Regal Films; Golden Lion Film Productions
- Distributed by: Regal Films
- Release date: December 2, 1993
- Country: Philippines
- Language: Filipino

Humanda Ka Mayor!: Bahala Na ang Diyos (lit. "Get Ready Mayor!: It's Up to God") is a 1993 Philippine crime drama film directed by Carlo J. Caparas from a story and screenplay he co-wrote with Gigi Javier Alfonso and Efren Montano. Loosely based on the murders of Eileen Sarmenta and Allan Gomez and the arrest of Calauan Mayor Antonio Sanchez, the film stars Aga Muhlach, Kris Aquino, and Dick Israel.

A co-production of Regal Films and Golden Lion Film Productions, the film was theatrically released on December 2, 1993, to box office success.

== Plot ==
A message from the Department of Interior and Local Government is shown before the film itself starts. The message states that the agency is making steps in order to avoid further incidents, as shown in the film.

The film begins by showing a washed-up Immaculate Conception in the beach being retrieved by the local fishermen, and this becomes the local patron saint of the town. At the present day, people are praying at the same beach for the local mayor, and both Myra, a member of an opposing political clan, and Dennis witness the event.

Myra exclaims to Dennis that the people of the town are being fooled by their town mayor, Miguel Beltran. While the two are talking in a darkroom, Mayor Beltran beats up two of his bodyguards because of an infraction. The beating only stops when the mayor's family arrives; the mayor pretends to his son that it is part of an acting skit. Mayor Beltran's officials bribe the local police to continue logging operations in the forest.

Myra and Dennis are unwinding in the forest when suddenly, the mayor's henchmen abduct the two. It is revealed that both Myra and Dennis were killed. Christine, a reporter for a TV station, arrives at the funeral and meets Adrien, Myra's older brother. Christine reports on the murder while Adrien sends out an angry message towards Beltran on national television. The mayor tries to hide the situation that unfolds.

The next day, Christine is reporting near the murder site when Beltran's henchmen attack the news station crew, killing everyone except Christine. She tries to sympathize with Adrien; however, her attempts are bluffed by him. Christine tries to file a report on the incident at the local police station, but it falls on deaf ears; the police captain then calls Beltran about the incident. Back at the TV station, Christine argues with the head official.

Christine returns to the town and meets up again with Adrien, and there they encounter an old man watching over them, who introduces himself as Mang Simeon. Mang Simeon then reveals the details of the murder of the two victims. As the two are abducted, Mang Simeon notices the group, and the henchmen beat him up to prevent him from revealing the details. The two are then brought to the mayor's house to confront Beltran.

Beltran beats up Dennis as retaliation for Myra's physical attacks on the mayor. The mayor forces the two to follow his commands, or else he would kill them with his M16 rifle. As Dennis is about to be killed by the mayor, he attempts to disarm Beltran, causing the bullets to fly above. The mayor then calls his henchmen to drag him away while Dennis forces Myra to leave Mayor Beltran's house quickly. She hears gunshots while leaving, possibly indicating that Dennis has been killed. While running away, Myra encounters Dennis, dying from his gunshot wounds. The mayor recaptures Myra and beats her to death. The two victims, Myra and Dennis, are buried somewhere in the forest.

Both Christine and Adrien talked at the beach, and Adrien talked about the details of Christine's life while she was alive, and what Adrien talked about was his life as an engineering student in order to meet his family's needs. Mang Simeon's family is raided by the mayor's henchmen, who force him to speak up. As Mang Simeon is being beaten up by the henchmen, he tells them that he is no longer afraid of the mayor; in response, he is killed by one of Mayor Beltran's bodyguards. Arturo, Mang Simeon's son, is spared from the execution.

The next day, Mang Simeon's lifeless body is on full display for the town to see. This shocks Christine, who runs away from the town plaza. Adrien asks her as to why she is running away. He then goes to see the corpse and is angered, prompting him to learn how to use firearms. While hallucinating about the mayor, Adrien shoots a lizard. Christine, on the other hand, is calling her mother while Mang Pablo, a companion of hers, is being tortured by the henchmen.

Christine then asks Adrien about Mang Pablo's whereabouts; however, Adrien does not know where he is. Adrien tells Christine to return to Manila as the town is no longer safe for her, causing a conflict between them. Mayor Beltran is visited by his wife and child; his wife tells him that more reporters are visiting the town as more questions are being pressed against him.

Christine's head official visits the town as well as the TV station crew, and the head official expressed concerns about her safety. While the two are talking, the mayor rolls up his car window to politely ask the reporters to enter his house. There he is pressed with multiple questions, and the mayor lies to the reporters about Myra and Dennis' plight. She then tells the mayor about what he did to Mang Simeon and asks about Mang Pablo, causing one of the bodyguards to angrily rebuke her claims. She is then escorted off by the head official.

While the report is being broadcast, Adrien is preparing his weapons to be used to kill the mayor. Christine is persuaded by both her parents to rest for a while since the situation in the town is tense, but she argues with them. Adrien visits her place, and they meet one last time. As Christine's family is about to go home to Manila, they are stopped at a checkpoint. Christine decides to get out of the car to run away from the henchmen. A chase ensues, and she hides in the bushes to avoid capture.

Adrien argues with Christine's parents about her situation. As Christine is walking in the forest, she is seen by loggers, who then chase her. As the loggers split into smaller search parties, Christine continues to run away, but she slips from a shallow cliff. A logger is about to kill her as she was cleaning up, but Adrien kills him instead.

At the mayor's house, the mayor's wife tells her husband that she will leave him and live abroad. Mayor Beltran agrees to her decision; however, he can't agree to his wife taking their only son. Christine talks to Arturo's family and learns about the situation. Mayor Beltran sees his wife and son leaving him from the window.

Adrien stealthily ambushes a logger while Arturo and Christine are raided by the henchmen, with Arturo's family presumably killed. Adrien then attacks the rest of the henchmen, picking them off one by one. The police then arrive at the mayor's house; however, the town watch that is packing up informs them that the house is vacant and the mayor had gone to his beach house. The police then go to the beach house and talk to one of the surviving bodyguards. The bodyguard tells the police captain that the arrest should be junked like before, but the captain refuses and orders his men to prepare for the upcoming onslaught.

Christine is revealed to be captured by Beltran, who shows her the patron saint that he is protecting. The mayor threatens her with Russian roulette and loads the gun with five bullets. Outside the beach house, the police and the henchmen shoot each other, killing men on both sides. The mayor threatens the police that he will kill Christine if the shootout continues. Adrien keeps shooting the henchmen and asks one of them about Christine's whereabouts. This causes the mayor to become more paranoid.

Adrien captures Beltran and brings him to the beach, as Arturo frees the birds that were held in the mayor's captivity. Adrien holds the mayor at gunpoint, forcing him to pray. The patron saint is taken away from Mayor Beltran as Adrien reveals that his ancestors were the ones who retrieved the patron saint from the beach generations ago. The police captain convinces Adrien to spare the mayor's life, as he would have to be prosecuted through legal means. While Adrien is being restrained by the police for beating up Mayor Beltran, the mayor escapes from the police.

== Cast ==
- Aga Muhlach as Adrien Bernardo, the older brother of Myra Bernardo, a victim of Mayor Miguel Beltran
- Kris Aquino as Christine, a Manila-based reporter who became acquainted with Adrien
- Nida Blanca as the mother of both Adrien and Myra Bernardo
- Luis Gonzales
- Dick Ysrael as Mayor Miguel Beltran (based on Mayor Antonio Sanchez)
- Tommy Abuel
- Robert Arevalo
- Luz Valdez as Ms. Beltran, the wife of the mayor
- Sunshine Cruz as Myra Bernardo, a person loosely based on Mary Eileen Sarmenta
- Jeffrey Santos as Dennis Roque, a person loosely based on Allan Gomez
- Romy Diaz
- Bomber Moran
- Ramil Rodriguez
- Ali Sotto
- Gigi Javier Alfonso
- Ernie Forte
- Ernie David
- Nonoy de Guzman
- Eddie Tuazon
- Boy Antiporda
- Manny Rodriguez
- Ronnie Francisco
- Rey Fabian
- Tony Tacorda

== Production ==
The film is loosely based on the rape-slaying of Eileen Sarmenta and supposed boyfriend Allan Gomez by then former mayor Antonio Sanchez of Calauan, Laguna and his henchmen and later convicted of the crime with a total jail term of 360 years.

The film was shot in the town of Maragondon, Cavite.

== Release ==
Humanda Ka Mayor! was released on December 2, 1993.

=== Box office ===
The film was a box office success, grossing ₱4 million on its opening day alone.
