= Charlie Davao =

Filipino actor (1934–2010)

- Born: Charles Wahib Valdez-Davao; October 7, 1934; Iloilo City, Philippine Islands
- Died: August 8, 2010 (aged 75); Manila, Philippines
- Education: University of the East
- Occupation: Actor
- Years active: 1959–2010
- Spouses: Emma Marie Abiera; Mary Grace Iñigo
- Children: Bing Davao; Ricky Davao; Mylene Davao; Marlene ″Mymy″ Davao; Charlon Davao
- Parents: León Davao (father); Estrella Valdez (mother)

Charles Wahib Valdez Davao (October 7, 1934 – August 8, 2010) was a Filipino actor known for roles in film and television.

== Early life ==
Born Carlos Wahib Davao y Valdez in Iloilo City of a Filipino mestizo of Spanish and Arab descent (Jordanian). He moved to Manila in 1954 to pursue a degree in commerce at the University of the East. He became involved in commercial and print ad modeling as a student.

== Career ==
Although he was attentive in school, his main goal was to engage in film acting, which he realized after a friend told him about an audition at the Sampaguita Pictures.

He did not miss the chance and passed the audition with flying colors. In 1959, he was introduced in Isinumpa, a drama film that also starred Dolphy, and topbilled by Rick Rodrigo and Barbara Perez.

Among his most memorable performances were in 1962 film Kaming Mga Talyada, where he played gay with matinee idols the late Juancho Gutierrez and Jose Mari Gonzales, and Trudis Liit with Vilma Santos. Both films were produced by Sampaguita.

But lead roles were hard to come by because he was identified with character assignments. Davao's biggest break came when he did Pitong Matahari, a James Bond-type of a film where he played Agent 009 in 1965.

Soon after, he was given action roles until he was assigned villain roles again. In the 70s, he also starred in several Hollywood co-produced films such as A Fistful of Feathers, Blind Rage, The Last Reunion and Women in Cages where he was billed as Charles Davis. His other films included Palengke Queen with Nora Aunor in 1982; Pedro Tunasan with Lito Lapid in 1983; Get Victor Corpus: The Rebel Soldier with Rudy Fernandez in 1987; The Rape of Virginia P. with Alma Moreno in 1989; Batas ng 45. with Fernando Poe Jr. in 1991 and Volta with Ai-Ai delas Alas in 2004.

Among his films associated with Mindanao were Bad Boy from Dadiangas, starring then world champ Rolando Navarrete, and Magindanao with Mohamad Faizal, both in 1982.

He played the ultimate bad guy, Satan, in the film The Killing of Satan, starring Ramon Revilla Sr., in 1983. His last film appearance was in the 2007 film Desperadas as father of Marian Rivera's character.

He started appearing on television in 1993 with the ABC-5 miniseries Noli Me Tangere, produced by the Cultural Center of the Philippines and directed by Eddie Romero. He later starred in Mula sa Puso with Claudine Barretto for ABS-CBN. His last appearance on ABS-CBN was in 2009 during the Chapter 14 of ABS-CBN's primetime series, May Bukas Pa as Don Carlos, the grandfather of Abby (KC Concepcion). Davao last appeared on television in GMA shows like Darna and Rosalinda.

== Personal life ==
Davao was married to Emma Marie Abiera, a Spanish professor at the St. Theresa's College. They have four children — Bing, Ricky, Mylene and Marlene. Mylene died in an accident when she was 5 years old. When Emma Marie died, Davao remarried to Mary Grace Iñigo, sister of late film actress and comedian Cecille "Dabiana" Iñigo. They have two children, one of them was former child star Charlon Davao.

== Death ==
Charlie Davao died unexpectedly at Philippine General Hospital in Manila on August 8, 2010, at the age of 75. He had been suffering from colon cancer.

== Filmography ==
=== Film ===
Year	Title	Role
1959	Isinumpa	
1960	Double Cross	
1961	Batas ng Lipunan	
1961	Dayukdok	
1962	Kaming Mga Talyada	
1962	Susanang Daldal	
1962	Tugtuging Bukid	
1962	Bulung-Bulungan	
1963	Anak, ang Iyong Ina!	
1963	Sabina	
1963	Prinsipeng Tulisan	
1963	Sinisinta Kita	
1963	Ang Manananggol ni Ruben	
1963	Esperanza at Caridad	
1963	Trudis Liit	
1963	Ang Bukas Ay Akin!	
1964	Kumander Judo	
1964	Anak ni Kamagong	
1964	Sa Bilis Walang Kaparis	
1964	Reyna ng Tondo	
1964	Sa Kuko ng Lawin	
1964	Mr. Wong vs. Mistico	Mistico
1965	7 Mata-Hari	Agent 009
1965	Doble Talim	
1967	Ang Limbas at ang Lawin	
1967	Anong Ganda Mo!	
1969	Dugo ng Vampira	
1971	Women in Cages	Rudy
1972	Roulette	
1973	The Panther	
1974	The Dragon Force Connection	
1975	Niño Valiente	
1975	Supercock	Spaniard
1976	Bergado (Terror of Cavite)	
1977	Asiong Aksaya	
1977	Ibilanggo si Neneng Magtanggol	
1978	Mokong	
1978	Gorgonya	
1978	The Last Reunion	Dante Salazar
1978	Blind Rage	Johnny Duran
1978	Last Target	
1979	Back to Back	
1980	Tatlong Patak ng Dugo ni Adan	
1981	Usigin ... Sino?	
1981	Kapitan Kidlat	
1982	Palengke Queen	
1982	Brother Ben	
1982	Bagong Boy Condenado	
1982	Isaac ... Dugo ni Abraham	Don Salvador
1982	Bad Boy from Dadiangas	
1982	Dormitoryo! Buhay Estudyante	
1982	Magindanao	
1983	Hubad ng Gubat	
1983	The Killing of Satan (Lumaban Ka Satanas)	Satan
1983	Laruan	
1983	Pedro Tunasan	
1983	Milyon	
1983	Over My Dead Body	
1983	To Love Again	Don Ramon
1984	Nardong Putik (Kilabot ng Cavite) Version II	
1984	Hanggang sa Huling Bala	
1985	Bed Sins	
1985	Musmos	
1985	Zuma	
1985	Ben Tumbling (A People's Journal Story)	
1985	Sa Bawat Hahakbangan, Babaha ng Dugo	
1986	Napakasakit, Kuya Eddie!	Willy Ledesma
1987	Operation: Get Victor Corpus, the Rebel Soldier	
1987	Feliciano Luces: Alyas Kumander Toothpick, Mindanao	Mister Lazaro
1987	Mga Anak ni Facifica Falayfay	
1987	Ready!.. Aim!.. Fire!..	
1987	Barbaro Santo	
1987	Boy Tornado	Mr. Barzuela
1988	Afuang: Bounty Hunter	
1988	Target: Maganto	
1988	Urban Terrorist	
1988	Sa Likod ng Kasalanan	Don Emilio
1988	Sgt. Ernesto 'Boy' Ybañez: Tirtir Gang	Waldo
1988	Kumander Dante	
1988	Iyo ang Batas, Akin ang Katarungan	Carlos
1988	Agila ng Maynila	
1989	Arrest: Pat. Rizal Alih – Zamboanga Massacre	General Renato de Villa
1989	Walang Susuko	
1989	Here Comes the Bride	Simon
1989	Baricuatro: Batang Cebu .45	
1989	Virginia P.	
1989	Wanted: Pamilya Banal	Don Roberto
1989	Carnap King? (The Randy Padilla Story)	
1990	Sgt. Patalinhug: CIS Special Operations Group	
1990	Nazareno Apostol: Boy Ahas	
1990	Lumaban Ka Sagot Kita sa Diyos	Capt. Santos
1990	Sgt. Clarin: Bala Para sa Ulo Mo	
1990	Sgt. Miguel Carpio: Multiple Murder	
1991	Joey Boy Munti, 15 Anyos Ka sa Muntilupa	
1991	Sgt. Patalinghug: CIS-Special Operations Group	
1991	Batas ng .45	
1991	Mabuting Kaibigan, Masamang Kaaway	Montinola's Campaign Manager
1992	Gobernador	
1992	Lacson: Batas ng Navotas	
1992	Fatal Chase	
1992	Magdaleno Orbos: Sa Kuko ng Mga Lawin	Araneta
1992	Shotgun Banjo	Atty. Agustin
1992	Kamay ni Cain	
1992	Sinungaling Mong Puso	
1992	Hanggang May Buhay	
1993	Lethal Panther 2	Maj. Foronda
1993	Kakambal Ko sa Tapang	
1993	Hindi Kita Malilimutan	Anton
1993	Lt. Madarang: Iginuhit sa Dugo	Col. Valdes
1993	Magkasangga 2000	Tecson
1993	Pambato	
1994	Once Upon a Time in Manila	Luigi
1994	Tinyente Saplan: Walang Kasukat sa Tapang	
1995	Alfredo Lim: Batas ng Maynila	
1995	Minsan Pa: Kahit Konting Pagtingin Part 2	The Big Boss
1995	Mangarap Ka	Manolo
1996	Kung Kaya Mo, Kaya Mo Rin!	Boss
1996	Ben Balasador: Akin ang Huling Alas	Bernard
1996	Totoy Hitman	Miguel
1996	Bagsik ng Kamao	Don Pablo
1997	Bridesmaids	
1997	Iligpit si Victor Sarraza	Domingo Palacio
1998	Walang Katumbas ang Dugo	
1998	Marahas: Walang Kinilalang Batas	Don Menardo Ballesteros
1998	Braulio Tapang: Sa Guhitin ng Kalaban	Don Aurelio
1998	Sambahin ang Ngalan Mo	Don Claro Mascardo
1999	Kamay ni Eva	
1999	Markado	
1999	Dugo ng Birhen: El Kapitan	Professor Alvarez
1999	Largado, Ibabalik Kita sa Pinanggalingan Mo!	
2000	Eto Na Naman Ako	General Acosta
2001	Ooops, Teka Lang... Diskarte Ko 'To!	Col. Delos Reyes
2001	Paninda	
2001	Pangako... Ikaw Lang	Mr. Pascual
2001	Hiyas... sa Paraiso ng Kasalanan	
2002	Batas ng Lansangan	Boss Montenegro
2002	Walang Iba Kundi Ikaw	
2002	Gising Na si Adan	Gov. Monerola
2003	The Legend: Tomagan	
2003	Walang Kapalit	Mr. Velasco
2004	Masikip sa Dibdib: The Boobita Rose Story	Senator
2004	Volta	
2005	Enterpool: S.C.I.A., Senior Citizen in Action	
2005	Lisensyadong Kamao	
2006	Tatlong Baraha	Hepe General
2007	Desperadas	Courtney's father

=== TV shows ===
Year	Title	Role
1988	Ula: Batang Gubat	Don Servando Montecillo
1993	Noli Me Tangere	Kap. Heneral
1997–1999	Mula sa Puso	Don Ricardo Maglayon
1999–2001	Saan Ka Man Naroroon	Francisco Sarmeniego
2003–2004	Basta't Kasama Kita	Federico Gonzales
2006	Sa Piling Mo	Mayor
2007	Margarita	
2008-2009	Sine Novela: Saan Darating ang Umaga?	Don Leonardo Rodrigo
2009	Totoy Bato	Datu
2009	Sine Novela: Ngayon at Kailanman	Don Artemio Noche
2009	Rosalinda	Victor Dorantes
2009	Mars Ravelo's Darna	Dr. Montgomery
2009	May Bukas Pa	Don Carlos (His last tv appearance)
