= Sandakot Na Bala =

1988 film starring Rudy Fernandez

- Directed by: Jose N. Carreon
- Screenplay by: Ricky Lee; Jose Carreon
- Story by: Carlo J. Caparas
- Starring: Rudy Fernandez
- Cinematography: Ricardo Jacinto; Ver Reyes; Sergio Lobo
- Edited by: Augusto Salvador
- Music by: Jaime Fabregas
- Production company: Regal Films
- Distributed by: Regal Films
- Release date: October 13, 1988
- Country: Philippines
- Language: Filipino
- Box office: ₱1.8 million

Sandakot Na Bala (lit. 'A Handful of Bullets') is a 1988 Philippine action drama film directed by Jose N. Carreon, who co-wrote the script with Ricky Lee, on his directorial debut. The film stars Rudy Fernandez alongside Gloria Romero, Eddie Garcia, Nadia Montenegro, Monica Herrera, RR Herrera, Billy Joe Crawford, and Melanie Marquez. Sandakot Na Bala is the first action film produced by Regal Films, and was released on October 13, 1988.

The film received a positive reception from critics such as Lav Diaz, who praised its focus on the adverse psychological effects of gun violence on individuals.

== Cast ==
- Rudy Fernandez as Emil
  - RR Herrera as Young Emil
- Gloria Romero as Elena
- Eddie Garcia as Daniel
- Melanie Marquez as Claudia
- Nadia Montenegro as Melissa
- Monica Herrera as Alicia
- Billy Joe Crawford as Jun Jun
- Subas Herrero as Rico
- Zandro Zamora as Rigor
- Gil de Leon as Paras
- Mario Escudero as Bino
- Robert Talabis as Rolly
- Romeo Rivera as Renato

== Production ==
Rudy Fernandez chose to star in Sandakot Na Bala before starring in Ang Bala at ang Rosaryo (lit. '"The Bullet and the Rosary"'), as he wished to prove something first. Ang Bala at ang Rosaryo was supposed to be his first film for Regal Films, and Snooky Serna would have been his love interest, though the project did not come to fruition.

Though Regal Films served as distributor of a few action films in the past, Sandakot Na Bala is the first action film to be produced by the studio, with the personal supervision of executive producer Lily Monteverde.

== Release ==
Sandakot Na Bala was released on October 13, 1988.

=== Box office ===
The film grossed ₱1.8 million on its opening day.

=== Critical response ===
Lav Diaz, writing for the Manila Standard, gave Sandakot Na Bala a positive review, commending the film's thematic focus on the adverse psychological effects of gun violence on an individual. He also gave praise to director Jose N. Carreon for handling action sequences well in his directorial debut. Justino Dormiendo of the National Midweek also applauded Carreon's "impressive" initial directorial effort for being "an insightful look at the culture of violence and its debilitating effects on the young mind."

== Accolades ==
Group	Category	Name	Result
FAMAS Awards	Best Picture - Action	Sandakot Na Bala	Nominated
FAMAS Awards	Best Actor	Rudy Fernandez	Nominated
FAMAS Awards	Best Child Actor	Billy Joe Crawford	Nominated
Catholic Mass Media Award	Best Actor	Rudy Fernandez	Won
PMPC Star Awards for Movies	Best Screenplay	Ricky Lee and Jose N. Carreon	Won
