= Cry No Fear =

Filipino thriller film

- Theatrical release poster
- Directed by: Richard V. Somes
- Written by: Richard V. Somes; Ron Bryant
- Produced by: Vincent del Rosario III; Veronique del Rosario-Corpuz
- Starring: Ella Cruz; Donnalyn Bartolome; Lito Pimentel; Christopher Roxas
- Cinematography: Luis Quirino
- Edited by: Jaime Dumancas
- Music by: Francis De Veyra
- Production company: Viva Films
- Distributed by: Viva Films
- Release date: 20 June 2018
- Running time: 105 minutes
- Country: Philippines
- Language: Filipino

Cry No Fear is a 2018 Filipino thriller film directed by Richard V. Somes and co-written by Somes and Ron Bryant, starring Ella Cruz and Donnalyn Bartolome. The film was produced by Viva Films and it was released in the Philippines on June 20, 2018.

== Plot ==
Kaycee (Donnalyn Bartolome) and Wendy (Ella Cruz) are always at each other's throats. But when they are left alone in their house during a storm, with intruders trying to kill them, they have no choice but to become partners as they try to escape.

== Cast ==
- Ella Cruz as Wendy
- Donnalyn Bartolome as Kaycee
- Lito Pimentel
- Christopher Roxas
- Lander Vera-Perez
- Patricia Javier
- Sheree Bautista as Dory
- Caleb Santos
- Carlyn Ocampo
- Rafael Siguion-Reyna
- William Buenafe
