= Kumander Dante (film) =

1988 Filipino biographical action film

- Directed by: Ben (M7) Yalung
- Screenplay by: Ricky Lee
- Story by: Bernabe Buscayno
- Produced by: Ben (M7) Yalung
- Starring: Phillip Salvador; Laarni Enriquez; Paquito Diaz; Charlie Davao; Robert Talabis; Bing Davao; Bomber Moran; King Gutierrez
- Narrated by: Bernabe Buscayno
- Cinematography: Jose Batac Jr.
- Edited by: Augusto Salvador
- Music by: Lutgardo Labad
- Production company: Cine Suerte
- Release date: September 1, 1988
- Country: Philippines
- Language: Filipino

Kumander Dante (lit. 'Commander Dante') is a 1988 Filipino biographical action film about the co-founder of the New People's Army, the militant arm of the Communist Party of the Philippines, Bernabe "Kumander Dante" Buscayno. Produced and directed by Ben "M7" Yalung from a screenplay by Ricky Lee, the film stars Phillip Salvador as the titular rebel, alongside Laarni Enriquez, Paquito Diaz, Charlie Davao, Robert Talabis, Bing Davao, Bomber Moran, King Gutierrez, E. R. Ejercito, and Ruben Rustia; Buscayno himself provides the narration. The film was produced by Cine Suerte and was released on September 1, 1988.

Critic Lav Diaz gave Kumander Dante a positive review. It was nominated for five FAMAS Awards, for Best Action Picture, Best Supporting Actor (Diaz), Best Cinematography, Best Music and Best Art Direction, but it did not win in any category.

== Cast ==
- Phillip Salvador as Bernabe Buscayno / Kumander Dante
- Laarni Enriquez
- Paquito Diaz as Col.Romeo Gatan
- Charlie Davao
- Robert Talabis
- Bing Davao
- Bomber Moran
- King Gutierrez
- E. R. Ejercito
- Ruben Rustia
- Lucita Soriano
- Ernie Zarate
- Mario Escudero
- Leo Lazaro
- Joel Lamangan as Ka Kastor
- Zandro Zamora as Kumander Alibasbas
- Mon Godiz as Jose Maria Sison/Ka Amado
- Franco Mateo as Victor Corpuz
- Ramon Reyes as Ninoy Aquino
- Luis Gonzales as Ferdinand Marcos

== Production ==
It is actor Luis Gonzales' third portrayal of Ferdinand Marcos, after the films Iginuhit ng Tadhana in 1965 and Pinagbuklod ng Langit in 1969.

Bernabe Buscayno stated in an August 1988 interview on the television program Public Forum that "40% of the film is not true", sharing that director Ben Yalung had altered certain portions of Ricky Lee's screenplay involving action sequences such as by adding the fictional scene of Buscayno disguising himself as a woman in a Volkswagen, to which Buscayno said that he only used a kalesa when he needed to be brought to a hospital for treatment. He also revealed that he had previously intended to delay the film's release in order to correct the inaccuracies, but decided against it due to the lengthy and expensive process of filing a complaint.

Phillip Salvador, who portrayed Buscayno in the film, also stated that they had to add scenes "for cinematic purposes" in order for the studio to make a profit at the box office and recoup the large budget it provided for the film.

== Release ==
Kumander Dante was graded "A" by the Movie and Television Review and Classification Board (MTRCB), indicating a "Very Good" quality, and was released in theaters on September 1, 1988.

=== Critical response ===
Lav Diaz, writing for the Manila Standard, gave the film a positive review. Though he criticized the filmmakers' decision to not heed Bernabe Buscayno's qualms about inaccuracies and exaggerated action scenes in the film ("even if [director] Yalung's over-exaggeration of fight scenes is removed, the life of Dante would still reach Lam-Ang proportions"), he still commended Yalung's direction, Ricky Lee's screenplay, and the film's shot-on-location scenes.

== Accolades ==
Group	Category	Name	Result
FAMAS Awards	Best Action Picture	Kumander Dante	Nominated
FAMAS Awards	Best Supporting Actor	Paquito Diaz	Nominated
FAMAS Awards	Best Cinematography	Joe Batac Jr.	Nominated
FAMAS Awards	Best Music	Lutgardo Labad	Nominated
FAMAS Awards	Best Art Direction	Bobby Bautista	Nominated
