= Abner Afuang =

Filipino politician and police officer (born 1944)

Mayor of Pagsanjan, Laguna
- In office June 30, 1998 – June 30, 2001
- Preceded by: Augusto Kamatoy
- Succeeded by: E. R. Ejercito

Personal details
- Born: Abner Afuang; March 22, 1944 (age 82)
- Party: Independent (2007; 2021–present)
- Other political affiliations: WPP (2018–19); Liberal (2015–16); KKK (2013); LDP (2004)
- Occupation: Politician, police officer
- Police career
- Service: Integrated National Police
- Allegiance: Philippines
- Divisions: Makati Police Department

Abner Afuang (born March 22, 1944) is a Filipino politician and former police officer of Makati who served as Mayor of Pagsanjan, Laguna. He is notable for burning a Chinese flag and pouring water on Hayden Kho in 2009 while in the middle of a Senate hearing.

== Early life ==
He was born in Pagsanjan, Laguna. He went to the Pedro Guevarra Memorial High School in 1992. He went to a police academy in Fort Bonifacio in 1972 and gained a Bachelor of Science in Criminology at the Philippine College. He then went to the NBI Academy in 1992.

== Political career ==
Before running, he was a police officer. He received a Most Outstanding Police Officer Award after a shootout. After his time as a police officer, he became a bounty hunter. Afuang ran for the Pagsanjan mayoral elections in the 1998 Philippine general election and won. He was the National President of the Citizens Anti-crime Assistance Group; He was the Founder and President of the Civilian and Police International Organization in 1987.

Afuang ran for a seat in the Manila City Council for the 5th district in 2016 under former Mayor Alfredo Lim's Liberal Party ticket, but lost. He ran for senator in the 2019 Philippine Senate election, but lost as he only gained 559,001 votes, ranking 42 out of 62 aspirants. He ran for senator in the 2022 Philippine Senate election as an independent candidate. He gained 893,333 votes, ranking 45 out of 64 aspirants.

== Publicity stunts and popular culture ==
Afuang's life was featured on a movie starring Philip Salvador. He was a former actor of Sampaguita Pictures. He was famous for pouring water on Hayden Kho during a senate hearing about a lewd scandal. He was arrested and detained but was later released. He is also famous for burning multiple flags in protest, namely the Flag of Singapore in 1995, a Chinese flag in 2012, a Malaysian flag in 2013, and Chinese flags three times in 2014.
