= Chinatown: Sa Kuko ng Dragon =

1988 action film starring Ramon "Bong" Revilla Jr.

- Directed by: Pepe Marcos
- Written by: Humilde Meek Roxas
- Produced by: Niki Rose Nuqui
- Starring: Ramon 'Bong' Revilla Jr.
- Cinematography: Baby Cabrales Jr.
- Edited by: Bas Santos
- Music by: Nonoy Tan
- Production company: Four-N Films
- Distributed by: Four-N Films
- Release date: December 8, 1988
- Country: Philippines
- Language: Filipino

Chinatown: Sa Kuko ng Dragon (lit. 'Chinatown: In the Claws of the Dragon') is a 1988 Filipino action film directed by Pepe Marcos and written by Humilde 'Meek' Roxas. It stars Ramon 'Bong' Revilla Jr., Tony Ferrer, Eddie Garcia, Aurora Sevilla, Mia Pratts, Rez Cortez, Christopher Paloma, Rommel Valdez, Baldo Marro, and Ruben Rustia. Produced and distributed by Four-N Films, the film was released on December 8, 1988.

Critic Lav Diaz noted Chinatown's intense violence, which he thought was influenced by the films of Arnold Schwarzenegger and Sylvester Stallone, and he expressed mixed feelings over the varying quality of the film's action scenes. The film received four FAMAS Award nominations, winning Best Picture - Action and Best Sound (Rolly Ruta).

== Plot ==
A policeman named Daniel Moreno (Revilla) tries to singlehandedly defeat a syndicate involved in arms trafficking and drug smuggling as revenge for the murder of his sister and girlfriend.

== Cast ==
- Ramon 'Bong' Revilla Jr. as Daniel Moreno
- Tony Ferrer as Peter Wang
- Eddie Garcia as Maj. Mario G. Robles
- Aurora Sevilla
- Mia Pratts
- Rez Cortez
- Christopher Paloma
- Rommel Valdez
- Baldo Marro
- Ruben Rustia
- King Gutierrez
- Mon Godiz
- Manjo Del Mundo
- Edwin Reyes
- Joey Padilla
- Bebeng Amora
- Ernie Forte
- Rolando Gonzalez
- Bomber Moran
- Renato del Prado
- Nilo Nuqui

== Release ==
Chinatown was given a "P-15" rating by the Movie and Television Review and Classification Board (MTRCB), and was released on December 8, 1988.

=== Critical response ===
Lav Diaz, writing for the Manila Standard, saw the film as another Filipino work influenced by the intense violence of films starring Sylvester Stallone or Arnold Schwarzenegger, stating that "Children too, [are] riddled with bullets." He gave mixed feelings for the action sequences, praising the chase scene involving a car and the action scenes at the start and the end of the film, but criticizing others for being basically filler. Diaz considers the love scene between Revilla's character and his lover to be the film's most memorable moment.

== Accolades ==
| Group | Category | Name | Result |
|---|---|---|---|
| FAMAS Awards | Best Picture - Action | Chinatown: Sa Kuko ng Dragon | Won |
| FAMAS Awards | Best Actor | Ramon 'Bong' Revilla Jr. | Nominated |
| FAMAS Awards | Best Child Actor | Christopher Paloma | Nominated |
| FAMAS Awards | Best Sound | Rolly Ruta | Won |
