= Lorenzo Ruiz... The Saint... A Filipino! =

- Directed by: Maria Saret
- Screenplay by: Serge Custodio
- Based on: Lorenzo Ruiz and His Companions: The Protomartyr of the Philippines by Fr. Fidel Villarroel
- Starring: Matt Ranillo III; Charito Solis; Dang Cecilio; Juco Diaz; Rose Ann Gonzales; Alvin Enriquez
- Cinematography: Popoy Orense
- Edited by: Abelardo Hulleza
- Music by: Carlos Rodriguez
- Production company: R.J.U. Films International
- Release date: October 5, 1988
- Running time: 111 Minutes 35 seconds
- Country: Philippines
- Languages: Filipino; Spanish; Japanese

Lorenzo Ruiz... The Saint... A Filipino! is a 1988 Filipino religious biographical film about the life and martyrdom of Saint Lorenzo Ruiz, the first canonized saint of the Philippines. Directed by Maria Saret and written by Serge Custodio Jr., it stars Mat Ranillo III as the titular saint, alongside Charito Solis, Dang Cecilio, Juco Diaz, Rose Ann Gonzales, and Alvin Enriquez.

Critic Lav Diaz gave Lorenzo Ruiz a mixed review, expressing disappointment in the inconsistencies found in the script which kept the film from becoming a classic. It was nominated for 11 FAMAS Awards, including Best Picture, Best Director, and Best Actor, but it did not win in any category. Saret and Custodio won the Film Academy of the Philippines Award for Best Adaptation.

== Plot ==
Set in the early 17th century, Lorenzo Ruiz: The Saint… A Filipino follows the life of Lorenzo Ruiz, a Filipino-Chinese Catholic from Binondo, Manila, who becomes entangled in a series of events that eventually lead to his martyrdom in Japan.

Born around 1600, Lorenzo grows up under the guidance of Dominican missionaries, serving as a church sacristan and clerk who later becomes an escribano under Spanish administration and joins the Confraternity of the Most Holy Rosary. Despite his religious devotion and service to the Church, Lorenzo becomes increasingly troubled by the discriminatory treatment of Filipinos under Spanish colonial rule.

His life takes a dramatic turn when a valuable rosary goes missing from the church, leading to accusations that he had stolen it. Although the accusation damages his reputation, a more serious incident soon places his life in danger. Following a physical altercation with a Spanish collector, the latter dies several days later, prompting Spanish authorities to suspect Lorenzo of involvement in his death. Fearing arrest and punishment for a crime he maintains he did not commit, Lorenzo seeks assistance from a Franciscan priest, who helps him board a ship bound for Japan.

Upon arriving in Okinawa, Lorenzo joins a group of missionaries in carrying out their religious activities. However, their presence and secret missionary work eventually attract the attention of Japanese authorities. The group is arrested and subsequently transferred to Nagasaki, where they face interrogation and imprisonment for violating the restrictions against Christianity.

During their captivity, Lorenzo and his fellow missionaries are subjected to a series of brutal methods of torture intended to force them to renounce their Christian faith. These include water torture, forced ingestion of water followed by pressure applied to the abdomen, blows involving wooden implements, and the insertion of needles beneath their fingernails. Despite the physical suffering and repeated demands that they abandon their beliefs, Lorenzo remains steadfast in his faith.

Their ordeal ultimately leads them to Nishizaka Hill in Nagasaki, where they are sentenced to undergo ana-tsurushi, a particularly severe form of execution used against Christians during the period of religious persecution in Japan. There, Lorenzo faces his final trial, marking the culmination of his journey from an accused man fleeing Manila to a martyr who refuses to renounce his faith.

== Cast ==
- Mat Ranillo III as Lorenzo Ruiz
- Charito Solis as Lorenzo's Mother
- Dang Cecilio as Mercedes (The wife)
- Juco Diaz as Carlos (The Eldest)
- Rose Ann Gonzales as Maria (The youngest)
- Alvin Enriquez as the younger brother
- Rosanno Abelardo as Padre Vicente Shiwozuka de la Cruz
- Ed Gaerlan as Padre Miguel De Aozarasa
- Joe Fisher as Padre Antonio Gonzales
- Eyal Samanton as Padre Guillermo Courtet
- Tony Lao As Lazaro of Kyoto
- Ramon Zamora as Kyawa
- Philip Gamboa as Berto
- Paquito Diaz as Spanish Officer
- Joseph De Cordova as Padre Jose
- Danny Pateña as Tokugawa Iemitsu
- Roi Aoyama as Aoyama/Cristovao Ferrera
- Dave Brodett as Sebastian
- Robert Miller as Captain Bilbao

Tokugawa Iemitsu played by actor Danny Pateña

== Critical response ==
Lav Diaz, writing for the Manila Standard, gave Lorenzo Ruiz a mixed review. He expressed disappointment in the script's inconsistencies such as the jarring language switching among Spanish and Japanese characters and Ranillo's alternating use of "Inay" and "Inang" to refer to Ruiz's mother, as he thought that the filmmakers' storytelling and efforts at historical accuracy were praiseworthy. In addition, Diaz was critical of the crowd scenes ("They do not know what they are doing") and the film's inconsistent lighting. However, Diaz concluded that it is still good enough to watch as a way to know more about Saint Lorenzo Ruiz.

== Accolades ==
Group	Category	Name	Result
FAMAS Awards	Best Picture	Lorenzo Ruiz: The Saint... A Filipino	Nominated
FAMAS Awards	Best Director	Maria Saret	Nominated
FAMAS Awards	Best Actor	Mat Ranillo III	Nominated
FAMAS Awards	Best Child Actor	Alvin Enriquez	Nominated
FAMAS Awards	Best Screenplay	Serge Custodio Jr.	Nominated
FAMAS Awards	Best Story	Fr. Fidel Villarroel	Nominated
FAMAS Awards	Best Cinematography	Popoy Orense	Nominated
FAMAS Awards	Best Editing	Abelardo Hulleza	Nominated
FAMAS Awards	Best Sound	Albert Rima	Nominated
FAMAS Awards	Best Song	Brando Juan	Nominated
FAMAS Awards	Best Art Direction	Vic Davao	Nominated
Film Academy of the Philippines Awards	Best Adaptation	Serge Custodio Jr. and Maria Saret	Won
