= House of Lies (Philippine TV series) =

2026 Philippine television drama series

- Title card
- Genre: Drama; Thriller
- Directed by: Jerry Lopez Sineneng
- Starring: Beauty Gonzalez; Mike Tan; Kris Bernal; Martin del Rosario
- Country of origin: Philippines
- Original language: Tagalog
- No. of episodes: 88

Production
- Running time: 26–35 minutes
- Production company: GMA Entertainment Group

Original release
- Network: GMA Network
- Release: January 19 – May 22, 2026

House of Lies is a 2026 Philippine television drama series broadcast by GMA Network. Directed by Jerry Lopez Sineneng, it stars Beauty Gonzalez, Mike Tan, Kris Bernal and Martin del Rosario. It premiered on January 19, 2026, on the network's Afternoon Prime line up. The series concluded on May 22, 2026, with a total of 88 episodes.

The series is streaming online on YouTube.

== Cast and characters ==
Cast

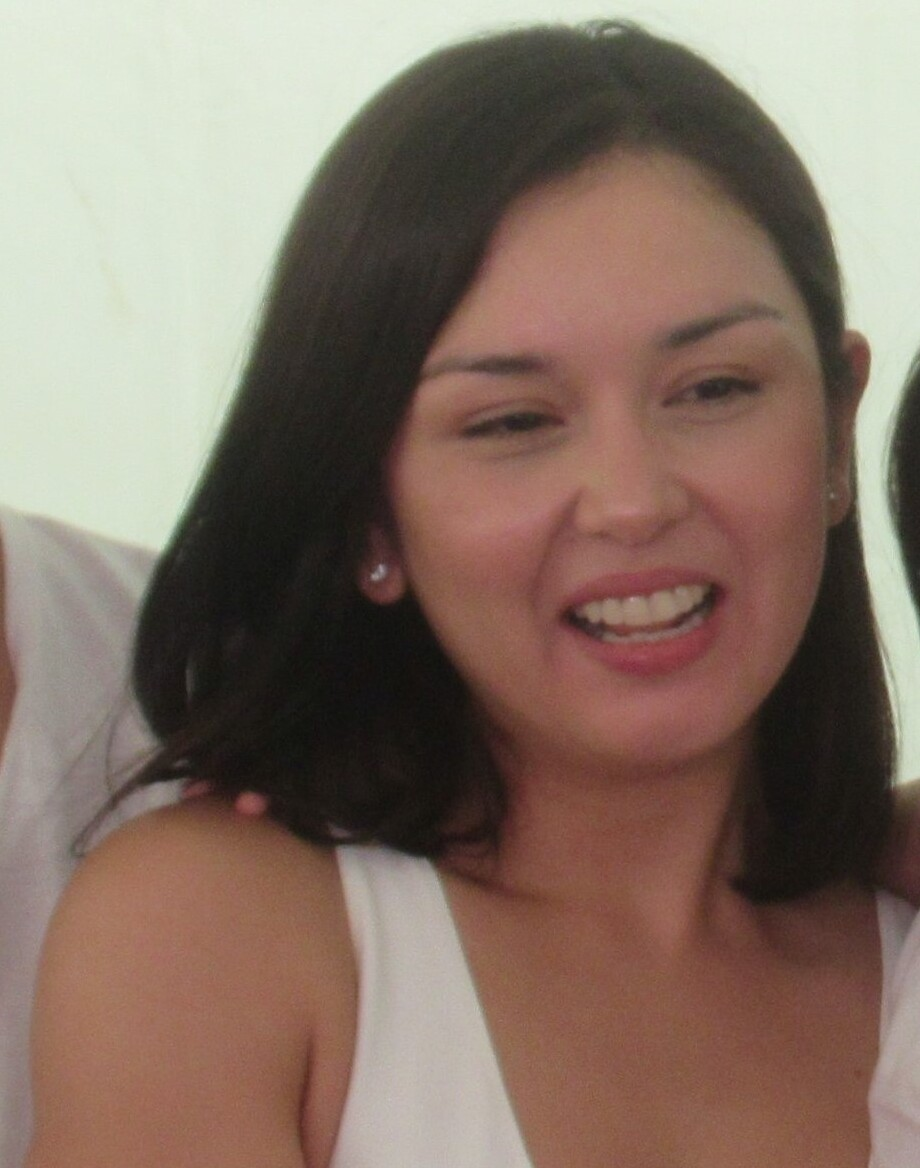
Beauty Gonzalez

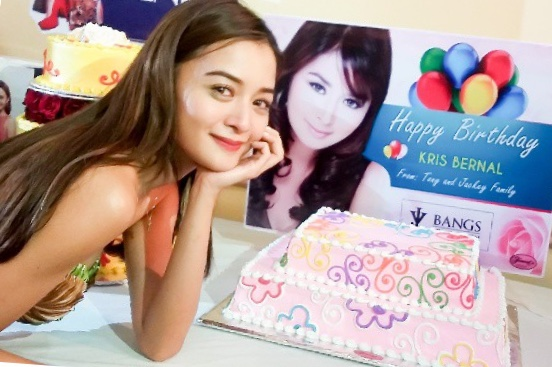
Kris Bernal

Lead cast

- Beauty Gonzalez as Marjorie "Marj" Castillo-Torrecampo
- Mike Tan as Paolo Torrecampo
- Kris Bernal as Althea "Thea" Torrecampo
- Martin del Rosario as Edward Torrecampo

Supporting cast

- Kokoy de Santos
- Snooky Serna
- Jackie Lou Blanco
- Kayla Davies
- Angel Cadao
- Geo Mhanna
- Lito Pimentel
- Tanya Gomez
- Patricia Tumulak
- Gee Canlas

== Ratings ==
According to AGB Nielsen Philippines' Nationwide Urban Television Audience Measurement People in television homes, the pilot episode of House of Lies earned a 4.3% rating. The final episode scored a 6.8% rating.
