= Afuang: Bounty Hunter =

Philippine action film

- Directed by: Mike Relon Makiling
- Written by: Tony Tacorda; Amado Lacuesta
- Produced by: Ramon Salvador
- Starring: Phillip Salvador
- Cinematography: Sergio Lobo; Ver Reyes
- Edited by: Ike Jarlego Jr.
- Music by: Jun Latonio
- Production company: Viva Films
- Distributed by: Viva Films
- Release date: February 25, 1988
- Running time: 105 minutes
- Country: Philippines
- Languages: Filipino; English

Afuang: Bounty Hunter is a 1988 Philippine biographical action film directed by Mike Relon Makiling. The film stars Phillip Salvador in the title role. The film is based on the life of Abner Afuang, a former police officer who was a Pagsanjan mayor by the time the film was released.

Critic Lav Diaz gave Afuang a positive review for its writing, production design and action scenes, though he opposed the film's superhuman-like portrayal of Afuang.

The film is streaming online on YouTube.

== Cast ==
- Phillip Salvador as Patrolman First Class Abner Afuang
- Marianne de la Riva as Evelyn Afuang
- Mark Gil as Benjie
- Zandro Zamora as Capt. Garcia
- Charlie Davao as Col. Garriga
- Ruel Vernal as Boy Paredes' brother
- Mon Godiz as Joey
- Eddie Garcia as Lauro Glorietta
- Lala Montelibano as Dolly
- Rene Quintos as Sarge
- Arman Bragado as policeman
- Bill Afuang Jr. as policeman
- Gary Abaca as doctor
- Lucita Soriano as Baldoza's wife
- Ernie Forte as Baldoza
- Ros Olgado as Ilustre
- Nanding Fernandez as Maj. Diaz
- Gladys Reyes as Avlyn Afuang
- Via Nueva as Dez
- Alex Toledo as Efren
- Romy Romulo as Cardo
- Roger Moring as Charlie
- Dindo Arroyo as Boyet
- Jimmy Reyes as Boy Paredes
- Rene Hawkins as Boy Bombay
- Mel Arca as Dodong Bautista
- Ronald Edio as Afuang twin
- Glen Edio as Afuang twin
- Baby Saño as Emang
- Ernie Zarate as Mr. Laurete
- Nemie Gutierrez as de los Santos
- Chito Alcid as Ruben
- Joe Jardy as boy of Glorietta
- Buddy de Leon as boy of Glorietta
- Big Boy Gomez as boy of Glorietta
- Roger Santos as boy of Glorietta
- Boy Salvador as Temyong
- Joey Padilla as Asyong

== Release ==
Afuang was released in theaters on February 25, 1988.

=== Critical response ===
Lav Diaz, writing his first film review for the Manila Standard, gave Afuang a positive review, commending the film's writing, production design, pacing, and action scenes, while also praising the film's "direct attack" on corruption within the police force. However, he expressed that his main gripe is the film's exaggerated portrayal of Afuang as a superhuman-like character, stating that "if the film's basis on real life is removed, [Afuang] becomes a nice action movie." Diaz was also critical of actor Eddie Garcia for his continued portrayal of "kenkoy" villains in films.

== Accolades ==
Year	Awards	Category	Recipient	Result	Ref.
1989	36th FAMAS Awards	Best Child Actress	Glaiza Herradura	Nominated	
1989	36th FAMAS Awards	Best Editing	Ike Jarlego Jr.	Nominated	
