= Jones Bridge Massacre (Task Force Clabio) =

1989 action film starring Lito Lapid

- Directed by: Ben "M7" Yalung
- Written by: Tony Mortel
- Produced by: Horace G. Yalung; Roman G. Yalung; Ricardo Q. Yalung; Eduardo V. Garcia
- Starring: Lito Lapid; Jackie Aquino; Eddie Garcia; Paquito Diaz
- Cinematography: Ernesto "Boy" Dominguez
- Edited by: Joe Solo
- Music by: Mon del Rosario
- Production companies: Cine Suerte; EG Productions
- Distributed by: Cine Suerte
- Release date: October 25, 1989
- Country: Philippines
- Language: Filipino

Jones Bridge Massacre (Task Force Clabio) is a 1989 Filipino crime action film based on an ambush on the Jones Bridge on June 8, 1989, in which two policemen were killed. Directed by Ben "M7" Yalung, the film stars Lito Lapid, Jackie Aquino, Eddie Garcia, Paquito Diaz, Berting Labra, Ruel Vernal, Robert Talabis, Rez Cortez, King Gutierrez and Edwin Reyes. Produced by Cine Suerte and EG Productions, the film was released on October 25, 1989.

Critic Justino Dormiendo of the National Midweek gave the film a positive review for its "engrossing" storytelling, though he was nevertheless critical of the decision to exploit a tragic incident for mass consumption.

== Cast ==
- Lito Lapid as P/Lt. Col. Aladdin Dimagmaliw
- Jackie Aquino
- Eddie Garcia as Brig. Gen. Garrido
- Paquito Diaz as Boy Ramirez
- Berting Labra as Hector Villar
- Ruel Vernal as Sgt. Jose Razon
- Robert Talabis as P/Capt. Cricensio Cabasal
- Rez Cortez as Capt. Wenceslao Ealdama
- King Gutierrez as Capt. Reynaldo Jaylo
- Edwin Reyes as Lt. Gene Javier
- Renato del Prado
- Manjo del Mundo
- Ernie Zarate as Brig. Gen. Alfredo Lim
- Romy Romulo
- Myleen Gonzales
- Rose Ann Gonzales
- Frank Lapid as Frank
- Polly Cagsawan
- Rene Yalung
- Roldan Aquino as Major Clavio
- Joey Padilla

== Production ==
Director Ben "M7" Yalung of Cine Suerte announced in July 1989 that he will produce a film adaptation of the June 8 incident, having consulted with both Western Police District chief Alfredo Lim and Movie and Television Review and Classification Board (MTRCB) chairman Manuel Morato regarding his intention. Phillip Salvador was originally cast as Lt. Col. Dimagmaliw. However, he was still on vacation and director Yalung was pressured to release the film while the incident was still of interest. As a result, Lito Lapid took over the role.

== Release ==
Jones Bridge Massacre was released in theaters in late October 1989. Brig. Gen. Alfredo Lim, director of the National Bureau of Investigation (NBI), was reportedly impressed by the film's trailer alone, and thus gave his endorsement of the film.

=== Critical response ===
Justino Dormiendo, writing for the National Midweek, gave Jones Bridge Massacre a positive review, praising its "engrossing" storytelling, the well-defined characterization of Aladdin, and the "gratifying" plot twist. However, he still cited numerous shortcomings of the film, such as the caricatured portrayal of real life figures such as Alfredo Lim and Jejomar Binay, the presumptuous stance the filmmakers took in presenting the twist as accurate to real life, and the film's apparent exploitation of "an all-too real event" for a mass audience.
