= Nandito Ako... Nagmamahal sa 'Yo =

- Directed by: Maryo J. de los Reyes
- Written by: Jake Tordesillas
- Produced by: Lily Y. Monteverde
- Starring: Aljur Abrenica; Kris Bernal
- Cinematography: Gary Gardoce
- Edited by: Tara Illenberger
- Music by: Fred Ferraz
- Production company: Regal Films
- Distributed by: Regal Films
- Release date: September 30, 2009
- Country: Philippines
- Languages: Filipino; English
- Box office: ₱5.246 million

Nandito Ako... Nagmamahal sa 'Yo is a 2009 Philippine romantic drama film directed by Maryo J. de los Reyes and written by Jake Tordesillas. The film stars Aljur Abrenica and Kris Bernal.

Produced and distributed by Regal Entertainment, the film was theatrically released on September 30, 2009.

== Plot summary ==
Tata (Aljur Abrenica) believes that Bohol is the ultimate paradise of hope for his slum dog life in Quiapo. When his ailing mother suddenly wished for them to transfer to Bohol, Tata's life underwent a major turning point. Upon his arrival, Tata will be shocked to find out that his biological father is still alive and that he has a stepbrother named Prince (Baron Geisler). Much to his surprise, Tata was immediately accepted by his new family and found a new life with them. As Tata begins his new life in Bohol, he will also discover the true love that he has been long waiting for in the personification of Stephanie (Kris Bernal), a rich and lovely lass. But when he finds out that Stephanie is the soon to be bride of Prince, Tata will have to toughly choose between family and his destiny.

== Cast ==
=== Main cast ===
- Aljur Abrenica as Lorenzo "Tata" Lugod
- Kris Bernal as Stephanie "Steph" Lozano

=== Supporting cast ===
- Baron Geisler as Prince Suganob
- Valeen Montenegro as Rubylyn Alba
- Ana Capri as Aida Lugod
- Lloyd Samartino as Orly Suganob
- Julio Diaz as Eddie Lozano
- Carlo Aquino as Makoy Flores
- Gerald Madrid as Fr. Manny Lozano
- Anton Bernardo as Rosauro Alimentado
- Lailette Boiser as Gemma Alimentado
- Disi Alba as Cheng Lozano
- Say Alonzo as Kyla
- Cathy Remperas as Jane
- Dean Pastrano as Roy
