= Bernabe Buscayno =

Filipino revolutionary leader (born 1943)

Personal details
- Born: c. 1943 (age 82) Capas, Tarlac
- Party: Communist Party of the Philippines
- Other political affiliations: Partido ng Bayan (1987)
- Nickname: Kumander Dante

Military service
- Allegiance: New People's Army (1969–1976)
- Years of service: 1960–1976
- Battles/wars: New People's Army rebellion

Bernabe Buscayno, also called Kumander Dante or Ka Dante, is the founder of the New People's Army, the military wing of the Communist Party of the Philippines.

== Early life ==
Bernabe Buscayno was one of eight children born to impoverished tenant farmers under a local landlord named Jose Ramos in Sitio Mangga, Talimundoc, Capas, Tarlac. In the late 1960s, after Buscayno's mother died of tuberculosis and his seven-year-old sister died of meningitis, his father, unable to support his remaining children, put them up for adoption. Ramos, the landlord, became the patron to the Buscayno family and "when Bernabe was old enough to begin his schooling, he and his brother Jose were sent to the landowner’s house in Quezon City." Buscayno finished grade school at Burgos Elementary School and high school at Roosevelt High School in Cubao, before moving to Angeles, Pampanga, to live with their aunt. He became a canecutter, earning 18 pesos for a six-day week. At his age, he led a small uprising to force the landowner to increase their wages. Another farmer, a former member of the Huks, recruited him into the Communist Party of the Philippines at age 17, where he was given the code name "Dante".

== Revolutionary career ==
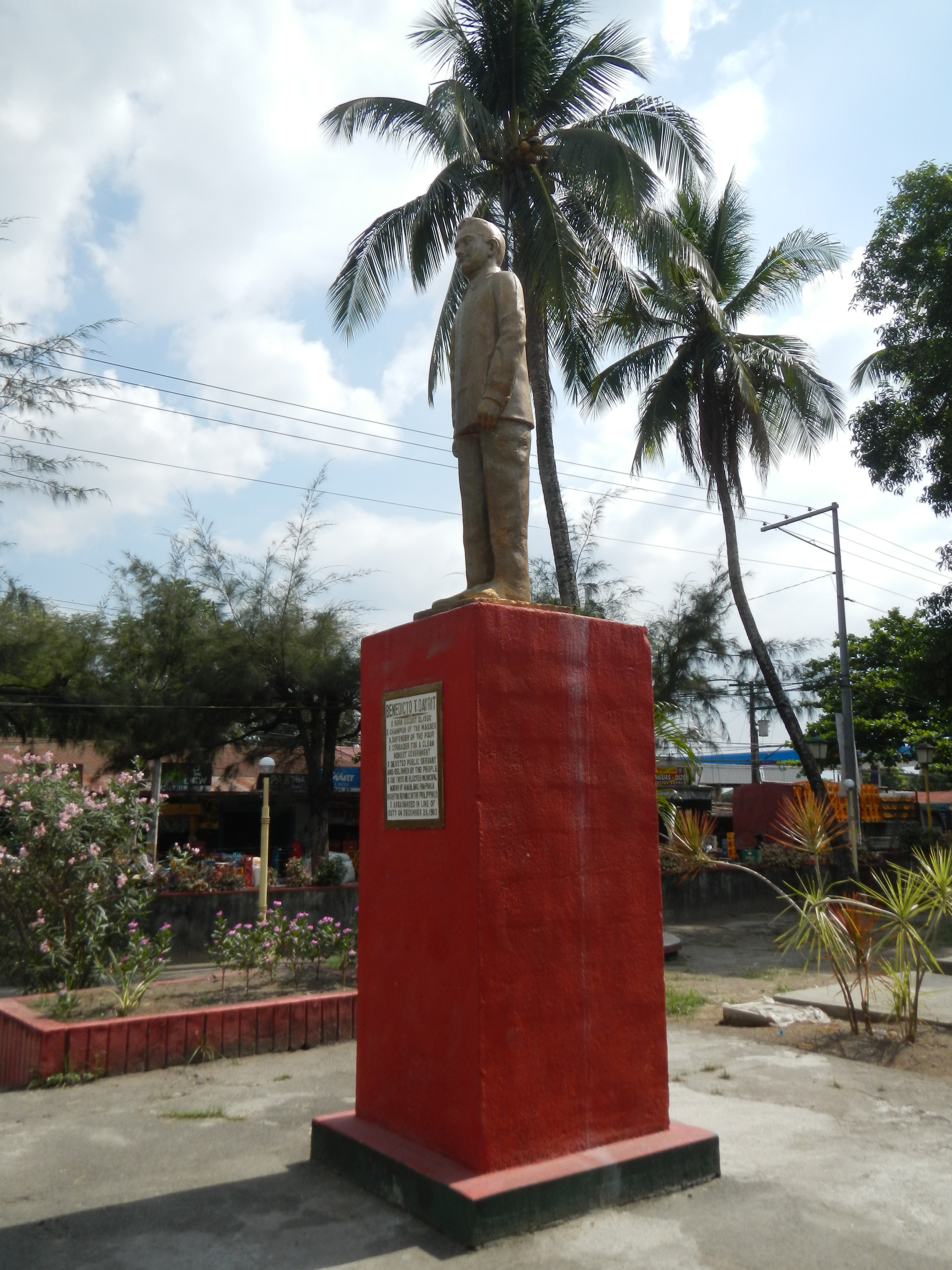
On 28 December 1963, Magalang Mayor Benedicto Tapnio Dayrit was assassinated by the alleged men of Huk Commander Sumulong (Buscayno).

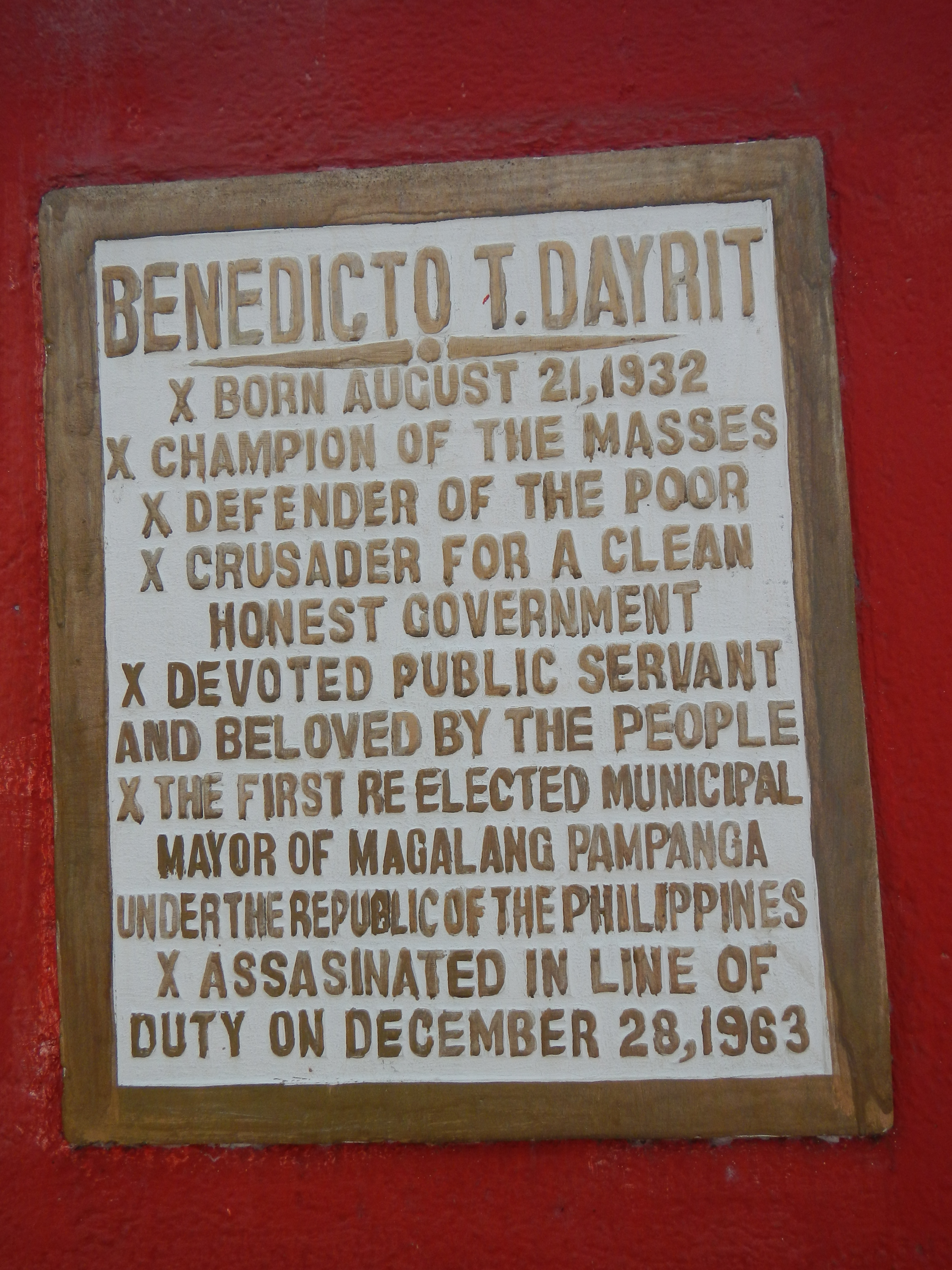
Historical marker

At age 21, Kumander Dante was already a full-time revolutionary. At 23, he became district commander in the outfit of Faustino del Mundo, "Kumander Sumulong" after the Sumulong outfit. Eventually dissatisfied with the latter, Kumander Dante recruited some fighters and joined forces with Jose Maria Sison, who founded the Communist Party of the Philippines on December 26, 1968. Buscayno's group officially became the New People's Army (NPA) on March 29, 1969.

From a group composed of about 35 members with only 10 rifles among them, the NPA grew up to about 26,000 members in its peak in the 1980s and spread throughout the Philippines, challenging the Marcos regime during the Martial Law years. Buscayno was finally captured in September 1976 at age 32 during what was called "Operation Scorpio". He had been a revolutionary for about 16 years.

On November 25, 1977, Military Commission No. 2 found him along with his two co-accused, Ninoy Aquino and Lt. Victor Corpus, guilty of subversion, murder, and illegal possession of firearms, and sentenced them to death by firing squad. Marcos later commuted their sentence due to international pressure over his government's human rights track record. Throughout the trial, Aquino had said that the military tribunal had no authority over their cases.

== Post-revolutionary years ==
After the 1986 EDSA Revolution, almost ten years after Buscayno's arrest, President Corazon Aquino ordered the release of hundreds of political detainees. Buscayno was one of those released. In 1987, Buscayno, together with a few other leftist leaders, formed the Partido ng Bayan (PnB). Buscayno ran for senator but did not win. In that same year, he survived an attempt on his life when he escaped getting shot when two men opened fire at his car, but was injured by shrapnel from a grenade. Two of his companions died while the other two were wounded; Buscayno himself still has three pieces of shrapnel in his back. Buscayno left Manila and returned to Capas, where he turned to farming, setting up the People's Livelihood Foundation-Tarlac Integrated Livelihood Cooperative (PILF-TILCO) in 1988. The cooperative was intended to help end the poverty of the peasants. However, Mount Pinatubo erupted in 1991, severely ruining vast tracts of land in Luzon including Tarlac, and contributing to the demise of the cooperative in 1994.

On February 6, 1998, Buscayno's 30-year-old son Reynaldo accidentally shot himself while playing with his gun during a drinking session with his brother Red in Capas. In 1999, the Department of Agrarian Reform awarded Buscayno and his family certificates of ownership for their own land. In 2000, Buscayno set up another cooperative, the Tarlac Integrated Agricultural Modernization Cooperative (TIAMC) which seeks to promote the mechanization of farm work, from sowing the seeds to harvest.

== In popular culture ==
In 1988, Buscayno's life as a rebel was adapted into a film called Kumander Dante, where he is portrayed by Phillip Salvador.
