= Jake Tordesillas =

Filipino screenwriter (1949–2017)

- Born: Joaquin C. Tordesillas; April 17, 1949; Quezon City, Metro Manila, Philippines
- Died: June 30, 2017 (aged 68); Quezon City, Metro Manila, Philippines
- Resting place: Loyola Memorial Park, Marikina
- Other name: Tito Jake
- Occupation: Scriptwriter
- Years active: 1979–2017

Jake Tordesillas (April 17, 1949 – June 30, 2017) was a Filipino screenwriter.

== Career ==
Over the course of his career, which began in 1979, he was nominated for three Gawad Urian Awards for best screenplay in 1989, 1991, and 1995. He and Jose Javier Reyes shared the 1991 Young Critics Circle for best screenplay.

== Filmography ==
=== Film ===
- Bagets (1984)
- Kapag Napagod ang Puso (1988)
- Nandito Ako Nagmamahal Sa'Yo (2009)

=== Television ===
As creative head

Year	Title
2009	The Wedding
2010	Jejemom
2011	I Heart You Pare
2011–2012	Amaya
2012	Legacy
2012	My Beloved
2012	One True Love
2012	Coffee Prince
2013–2017	Magpakailanman
2013	Dormitoryo
2015–2016	Because of You
2016	Juan Happy Love Story
2016	Sinungaling Mong Puso
2016–2017	Someone to Watch Over Me
2017	Meant to Be
2017	Pinulot Ka Lang sa Lupa
2017	Case Solved
2017	Daig Kayo ng Lola Ko

== Death ==
Prior to his death, he was the creative consultant for GMA Network. He also worked for IBC-13 in the 1980s.

He died at the age of 68 on June 30, 2017, due to a heart attack.
