= Luis Gonzales =

Filipino actor (1928-2012)

- Born: Luis Franco Mercado; June 21, 1928; San Luis, Pampanga, Philippine Islands
- Died: March 15, 2012 (aged 83); Makati, Metro Manila, Philippines
- Resting place: Santuario de San Antonio, Makati, Metro Manila, Philippines
- Other names: Mang Luis, Palengke
- Occupation: Actor
- Years active: 1954–2003
- Spouse: Vina Concepcion
- Children: 3

Luis Franco Mercado (June 21, 1928 – March 15, 2012) also known as Luis Gonzales, was a Filipino actor who appeared in more than 100 films during his career, most of them by Sampaguita Pictures. He worked with various celebrities such as Lolita Rodriguez, Gloria Romero, Dolphy, Amalia Fuentes, Susan Roces, Eddie Garcia, and others during his career.

== Early life ==
Born on June 21, 1928 in San Luis, Pampanga, and raised in Tondo, Manila, Gonzales may be best known for his portrayals of former President Ferdinand Marcos in three films: Iginuhit ng Tadhana (1965), a political propaganda film; Pinagbuklod ng Langit (1969), a dramatic film; and Kumander Dante (1988), an action film. Actress Gloria Romero starred opposite him as Imelda Marcos for the former two films. Gonzales and Romero starred in numerous other films together as well.

They first worked together on the 1955 film, Despatsadora, and were paired together more than 30 films under Sampaguita Pictures. He also won 4 FAMAS Awards in his movies as Best Actor such as Iginuhit ng Tadhana, Talipandas, Alaala Kita, and Pinagbuklod ng Langit in the years 1959, 1966 and 1970.

== Later life ==
His last movie was Xerex released in 2003 with co-star former actress Aubrey Miles and model turned actor, Jon Hall.

In December 2009, Gonzales received a star of the Eastwood City Walk of Fame, which marked his last public appearance.

== Death ==
Gonzales died of complications from pneumonia and heart problems at Makati Medical Center on the night of March 15, 2012, at the age of 83. He was survived by his wife, Vina Concepcion, and their three children. His funeral (cremation was scheduled in Friday) and three-day-week burial were held at Santuario de San Antonio in Forbes Park, Makati. The Interment is on Monday, 2 p.m. for his wake.

== Filmography ==
=== Film ===
Year	Title	Role
1954	Pilya	
1954	Bakasyonista	
1954	Nagkita si Kerubin at si Tulisang Pugot	Luis
1954	Luha ng Birhen	
1955	Artista	
1955	Ang Tangi Kong Pag-Ibig	Luis
1955	Despatsadora	Ernesto
1955	Contravida	
1955	Hootsy Kootsy	
1956	Teresa	Tony
1956	Pampangueña	
1956	Chabacano	
1956	Bakasyonista	
1956	Tumbando Caña	Ram
1956	Boksingera	Brando
1956	Pagdating ng Takip-Silim	Karlos
1957	Sino ang May Sala?	Luis
1957	Pasang Krus	
1957	Ismol Bat Teribol	Mauro
1957	Isang Milyong Kasalanan	
1957	Colegiala	Cornelio
1957	Taga sa Bato	
1958	Paruparong Bukid	
1958	Alaala Kita	
1958	Mga Reyna ng Vicks	Luis Villamor
1958	Tatlong Ilaw ng Dambana	
1958	Alaalang Banal	
1958	Talipandas	Bien
1958	Condenado	
1959	Ikaw ang Aking Buhay	Manuel
1959	Alipin ng Palad	
1959	Pitong Pagsisisi	
1959	Cicatriz	
1960	Palanca	
1960	Laura	
1960	Kuwintas ng Alaala	
1960	Ipagdarasal Kita	
1960	Lupa sa Lupa	Saldo
1960	Double Cross	Joey
1960	Ang Inyong Lingkod, Gloria Romero	
1960	Salamat Po, Doktor	Dr. Ramon Gonzales
1960	Ginang Hukom ("Pinatay Ko ang Aking Ina" segment)	
1960	7 Amores ("Pampango Story" segment)	
1961	Wen Manang	
1961	Tatlong Panata	Pablo Montalban
1961	Makasalanang Daigdig	
1961	Apat na Yugto ng Buhay	
1961	Batas ng Lipunan	
1961	Dayukdok	
1962	Holiday in Bali	Angelo Reyes
1962	Bulung-Bulungan	Renato
1962	Amaliang Mali-Mali	
1962	The Big Broadcast	
1963	Sinisinta Kita	
1963	Dance-O-Rama	
1963	Apat ang Anak ni David	Danilo
1963	Trudis Liit	
1964	Show of Shows	
1964	Jukebox Jamboree	
1964	Fighting Warays sa Ilocos	
1964	Bumunot Ka't Lumaban	
1964	Ang Rosaryo at ang Taba	
1964	Mga Kanyon sa Corregidor	
1965	Paano Kita Lilimutin?	
1965	Hamon Sa Kampeon	
1965	Iginuhit ng Tadhana (The Ferdinand E. Marcos Story)	Ferdinand Marcos
1966	Kapag Langit ang Umuusig	
1966	Ang Tao Ay Makasalanan	
1967	Kaibigan Ko'ng Sto. Niño	Crispin
1967	Maruja	Rosanno Gabriel
1967	Sino ang Dapat Sisihin?	
1968	Walang Hari ang Batas	
1968	Triple	Arnel
1968	Siete Dolores	
1968	Liku-Likong Landas	
1968	Kamatayan Ko ang Ibigin Ka	
1968	Elizabeth	
1969	Pinagbuklod ng Langit	Ferdinand Marcos
1969	Adriana	Cornelio
1970	Haydee	
1970	Ganid sa Laman	
1970	For You Mama	
1970	Snooky	
1970	My Beloved	
1971	Tubog sa Ginto	Celso
1971	Robina	Danilo
1971	Sakim	
1971	Ito Ba ang Pag-Ibig?	
1971	Always in My Heart	
1972	My Blue Hawaii	
1972	A Gift of Love	
1972	Just Married 'Do Not Disturb'	
1972	Winter Holiday	
1972	Nardong Putik	
1972	And God Smiled at Me	
1973	Cofradia	
1974	Kapitan Eddie Set	
1975	Kahit ang Mundo'y Magunaw	Armando
1975	Lulubog Lilitaw sa Ilalim ng Tulay	Luis Samaniego
1975	May Isang Tsuper ng Taxi	
1975	Niño Valiente	
1975	Siya'y Umalis, Siya'y Dumating	
1975	Batu-Bato sa Langit	
1975	Hindi Tayo Talo	
1978	Roma-Amor	Frankie Baron
1983	Pieta	Rubio
1983	JR	
1984	Anak ni Waray vs Anak ni Biday	Eli
1985	Pahiram ng Ligaya	
1986	Anak ni Waray vs Anak ni Biday	Luis
1986	Clarizza	
1987	Family Tree	Fidel
1988	Sa Akin Pa Rin ang Bukas	
1988	Kumander Dante	Ferdinand Marcos
1991	Madonna, Babaeng Ahas	Zacarias
1991	Kidlat ng Maynila: Joe Pring 2	Kabo dela Cruz
1991	Dinampot Ka Lang sa Putik	
1991	Adventures of 'Gary Leon at Kuting'	Governor
1992	Kamay ni Cain	
1992	Ang Katawan ni Sofia	
1992	Jaime Labrador: Sakristan Mayor	Father David
1993	Kadenang Bulaklak	Domeng Abolencia
1993	Humanda Ka Mayor!: Bahala Na ang Diyos	
1993	Aguinaldo	General
1994	Iukit Mo sa Bala	Mayor Roman Guerrero
1994	Iligpit si Victor Saraza	
1996	Seth Corteza	
1997	Where Is the Heart	Congressman
1997	Babae	Lolo Arman
1998	Kargado	
1999	Tatlong Makasalanan	
2000	The Debut	Tito Dante
2002	I Think I'm in Love	Ising
2003	Message Sent	
2003	Xerex	B.J. ("Kama" segment)
