= Ben Balasador: Akin ang Huling Alas =

- Official movie poster
- Directed by: Pepe Marcos
- Screenplay by: Henry Nadong
- Produced by: Orly Ilacad
- Starring: Ian Veneracion
- Cinematography: Danny Bustos
- Edited by: Pepe Marcos
- Music by: Nonong Buencamino
- Production companies: OctoArts Films; Cinemax Studios
- Distributed by: OctoArts Films
- Release date: August 21, 1996
- Running time: 95 minutes
- Country: Philippines
- Language: Filipino

Ben Balasador: Akin ang Huling Alas (English: Ben Balasador: The Last Ace is Mine) is a 1996 Philippine action film edited and directed by Pepe Marcos. The film stars Ian Veneracion in the title role.

== Cast ==
- Ian Veneracion as Ben Balasador
- Beth Tamayo as Theresa
- Mark Gil as Nelson
- King Gutierrez as Marco
- Patrick Guzman as Geron
- Shirley Fuentes as Vanessa
- Charlie Davao as Bernard
- Bing Davao as Arturo
- Teresa Loyzaga as Ben's Sister
- Pocholo Montes as Mr. Dela Serna
- Tom Olivar as Maj. Rodriguez
- Jim Rosales as Jake
- Rhey Roldan as Nelson's Finale Goon
- Levi Ignacio as Nelson's Finale Goon
- Gio Santos as Card Dealer
- Rudy Lapid as Iking
- Gil Nartea as Informer
- Albert Eugenio as Informer
- Johnny Ramirez as Barangay Captain
