= 1987 FAMAS Awards =

35th edition of Filipino movie awards

35th FAMAS Awards
- Date: 1987
- Site: Philippines
- Hosted by: Pilita Corrales and Bert "Tawa" Marcelo

Highlights
- Best Picture: Gabi Na, Kumander ~ VIVA Films
- Most awards: Magdusa Ka! ~ VIVA Films (4 wins)

The 35th Filipino Academy of Movie Arts and Sciences Awards Night was held in 1987 in the Philippines . This is for the Outstanding Achievements of the different films for the year 1986.

Magdusa ka won the most awards with four wins but it was Gabi na Kumader that won FAMAS Award for Best Picture both were produced by Viva Films. On the other hand, Nora Aunor earned her 15th consecutive nomination from FAMAS

== Awards ==
=== Major Awards ===
Winners are listed first and highlighted with boldface.

Best Picture	Best Director
**Gabi Na, Kumander — Viva Films**; Lumuhod ka sa Lupa — Sieko Films; Magdusa Ka! — Viva Films; Muslim Magnum .357 — FPJ Productions; Nasaan ka ng Kailangan Kita — Regal Films; Unfaithful Life — Regal Films	**Eddie Garcia — Magdusa Ka**; Pepe Marcos — Gabi Na, Kumander; Manuel Fyke Cinco — Lumuhod Ka sa Lupa; Fernando Poe Jr. — Muslim Magnum .357; Mel Chionglo — Nasaan Ka ng Kailangan Kita; Peque Gallaga — Unfaithful Wife
Best Actor	Best Actress
**Fernando Poe Jr. — Muslim Magnum .357**; Ramon Revilla — Cordillera; Phillip Salvador — Gabi Na, Kumander; Rudy Fernandez — 'Lumuhod ka sa Lupa!; Edu Manzano — 'Palimos ng Pag-ibig; Richard Gomez — 'Tuklaw; Joel Torre — 'Unfaithful Wife	**Dina Bonnevie — Magdusa Ka**; Nora Aunor — I Love you Mama, I Love you Papa; Vilma Santos — Palimos ng Pag-ibig; Susan Roces — Nasaan ka ng Kailangan Kita; Jackie Lou Blanco — Lumuhod ka sa Lupa; Jacklyn Jose — Private Show; Sharon Cuneta — Sana'y Wala ng Wakas
Best Supporting Actor	Best Supporting Actress
**Michael De Mesa — Unfaithful Wife**; Mark Gil — Agaw Armas; Mario Montenegro — Anak ng Supremo; Ronaldo Valdez — Huwag mo Kaming Isumpa; Dindo Fernando — Magdusa Ka; Paquito Diaz — Magnum Muslim .357; George Estregan — Magkayakap sa Magdamag	**Nida Blanca — Magdusa Ka!**; Chanda Romero — Agaw Armas; Lani Mercado — Blusang Itim; Rio Locsin — Huwag mo Kaming Isumpa; Lorna Tolentino — Nakagapos na Puso; Dina Bonnevie — Palimos ng Pag-ibig; Donna Villa — Paano Hahatiin ang Puso
Best Child Actor	Best Child Actress
**Ian De Leon — I Love YOu Mama, I Love YOu Papa**; Monossi Mempin — Halimaw; Jaypee de Guzman — Huwag mo Kaming Isumpa'; Alvin Enriquez — Paano Hahatiin ang Puso	**Precious Hipolito — Ang daigdig ay isang butil na luha**; Rose Ann Gonzales — Lumuhod ka sa lupa!; Katrin Gonzales — Nasaan ka nang kailangan kita'; Glaiza Herradura — Paano hahatiin ang puso
Best in Screenplay	Best Story
**Orlando Nadres — Magdusa Ka!**; Frank Rivera — Halimaw'; Frank Rivera — Bagong Hari	**Bienvenido Bacalso — Gabi Na, Kumander**
Best Sound	Best Musical Score
**Rolly Ruta — Lumohod ka sa Lupa**	**George Canseco — Palimos ng Pag-ibig**
Best Cinematography	Best Editing
**Ver Reyes — Muslim Magnum .357**	**Augusto Salvador — Lumuhod ka Sa Lupa**
Best Theme Song	Production Design
**Willy Cruz — Sana'y Wala ng Wakas**	**Rolando Sacristia — Muslim Magnum .357**

=== Special Awardee ===
- **Lou Salvador, Sr. Memorial Award**
  - **Pilita Corrales**

- **Dr. Jose Perez Memorial Award**
  - **Alfie Lorenzo**

- **Dr. Ciriaco Santiago Memorial Award**
  - **Eddie Romero**

- **Gregorio Valdez Memorial Award**
  - **Manuel Morato - Censor's Chairman**
