= Alega Gang: Public Enemy No.1 of Cebu =

1988 film starring Ramon "Bong" Revilla and Robin Padilla

- Directed by: Pepe Marcos
- Written by: Jose N. Carreon
- Starring: Ramon 'Bong' Revilla Jr.
- Cinematography: Rey de Leon
- Edited by: Pepe Marcos; Bass Santos
- Music by: Nonoy Tan
- Production company: RNB Films
- Distributed by: RNB Films (original); Moviestars Production (re-release)
- Release dates: June 23, 1988 (original); April 2, 1994 (re-release)
- Running time: 87 minutes
- Country: Philippines
- Language: Filipino

Alega Gang: Public Enemy No.1 of Cebu is a 1988 action crime film co-edited and directed by Pepe Marcos and written by Jose N. Carreon. It stars Ramon 'Bong' Revilla Jr. in the lead role. Set in Cebu, it tells an account of the life of Ulysses "Boboy" Alega (Revilla), and his descent into crime. Originally released on June 23, 1988, it was re-released on April 2, 1994, with Padilla receiving equal billing with Revilla.

Critic Lav Diaz gave a positive review of the film, commending its clear characterization of the main character in comparison to other films involving outlaws.

== Plot ==
In 1985, jeepney driver Ulysses "Boboy" Alega loses his vehicle just as he needed money to pay his rent and buy medications for his child. After he accidentally shoots and kills a person during a fight, Boboy is then imprisoned and tortured by the police. With his release from prison, Boboy eventually joins a group involved in arms smuggling, and after some time its members come to consider him as their leader.

== Cast ==
- Ramon "Bong" Revilla as Ulysses "Boboy" Alega
- Princess Punzalan as Cheryl Alega
- Ronel Victor as Alega Gang Member
- Jon Hernandez as Alega Gang Member
- Bing Davao as Alega Gang Member
- King Gutierrez as Alega Gang Member
- Robin Padilla as Alega Gang Member
- E.R. Ejercito as Alega Gang Member
- Edwin Reyes as Alega Gang Member
- Bobby Zshornack as Alega Gang Member
- Ramon Laxa as Alega Gang Member
- Bobby Roxas as Alega Gang Member
- Noel Trinidad as Alega Gang Member
- Perla Bautista as Boboy's Mother
- Joseph de Cordova as Boboy's Father
- Beverly Vergel as Boboy's Wife
- Alain Jason Bautista as Boboy's Brother
- Mark Alvin Bautista as Boboy's Son
- Ramon Olver Bautista as Boboy's Son
- Paquito Diaz as Abling
- Baldo Marro as Ramon
- Zandro Zamora as Police Intelligence
- Tony Tacorda as Police Chief
- Bomber Moran as Logan
- Danny Riel as Lozares Brothers
- Rene Hawkins as Lozares Brothers
- Joey Galvez as Radio Commentator

== Release ==
Alega Gang was released in the Philippines on June 23, 1988. On April 2, 1994, the film was re-released by Moviestars Production, with Padilla receiving equal billing with Revilla.

=== Box office ===
The film was box office hit in the Philippines, especially in Cebu City, where according to the Philippine Daily Inquirer, there was an alleged incident of people breaking a box office window while demanding tickets.

=== Critical response ===
Lav Diaz, writing for Manila Standard, gave a favorable review of Alega Gang, commending its clear illustration of the main character as a victim of society, unlike many other films featuring "police characters". Though he commented that Ulysses' final dying shout was "corny", he concluded that the film is a good addition to the list of intense Filipino action films.
