= Iyo ang Batas, Akin ang Katarungan =

1988 action film starring Ramon 'Bong' Revilla Jr.

- Directed by: Leonardo L. Garcia
- Screenplay by: Tony S. Mortel
- Story by: Cora Crisol
- Starring: Ramon 'Bong' Revilla Jr.; Eddie Garcia; Paquito Diaz; Melissa Mendez; Romy Diaz
- Cinematography: Rey Lapid
- Edited by: Edgardo 'Boy' Vinarao
- Music by: Nonoy Tan
- Production company: Buena Films International
- Distributed by: Buena Films International
- Release date: September 22, 1988
- Country: Philippines
- Language: Filipino

Iyo ang Batas, Akin ang Katarungan (lit. 'The Law Is Yours, Justice Is Mine') is a 1988 Filipino action film directed by Leonardo L. Garcia. The film stars Ramon 'Bong' Revilla Jr., Eddie Garcia, Paquito Diaz, Melissa Mendez, and Romy Diaz. Produced by Buena Films International, it was released on September 22, 1988.

Critic Lav Diaz gave the film a negative review, criticizing it as excessively cliché ("gasgas").

== Cast ==
- Ramon 'Bong' Revilla Jr. as Dante Reyes
- Eddie Garcia as Mayor Oliva
- Paquito Diaz as Waldo
- Kring-Kring Gonzalez as Rowena
- Charlie Davao as Carlos
- Romy Diaz as Martin
- Bing Davao as Atty. Tablante
- Nick Romano as Ka Meding
- Renato del Prado as Selmo
- Nello Nayo as Tomas
- Allan Rogelio as Nestor
- Melissa Mendez as Cristy
- Anita Linda as Pinang
- Christopher Paloma as Ato
- Baldo Marro as Chief Rubio
- Greggo Gavino as a barangay captain
- Efren Lapid as Cosme

== Release ==
Iyo ang Batas was graded "B" by the Movie and Television Review and Classification Board (MTRCB), indicating a "Good" quality. It was released in theaters on September 22, 1988.

=== Critical response ===
Lav Diaz, writing for the Manila Standard, gave Iyo ang Batas a negative review, criticizing the film overall as excessively cliché ("gasgas") and citing its title, story, action, and dialogue as examples. Diaz stated that "you would feel like you have already seen this movie many times or even heard it in a number of bloody radio programs." However, he noted that what can be considered the film's strength is its intense action, in the vein of films starring Arnold Schwarzenegger and Sylvester Stallone.

In 2016, in the early months of the Philippine drug war, Janus Isaac Nolasco of Kyoto Review of Southeast Asia cited the film as a demonstration of a general perception that Philippine society lacks an effective criminal justice system, with the hero Dante Reyes deciding to take matters into his own hands against a corrupt mayor.
