= Glaiza Herradura =

Filipino former child actress (born 1978)

- Born: Glaiza Herradura; February 24, 1978 (age 48); Cavite City, Cavite, Philippines
- Occupation: Actress
- Years active: 1984–1989
- Spouse: Bryant Agullo (m. 2002)
- Children: 2

Glaiza Herradura-Agullo (born February 24, 1978) is a Filipino former child actress. She was the first-ever grand winner of the Little Miss Philippines segment of Eat Bulaga! in 1984. She starred in RPN-9's television series Heredero with Manilyn Reynes and Richard Arellano. She won the 1988 FAMAS Best Child Actress award for her role in Batas Sa Aking Kamay starring Fernando Poe, Jr.

== Filmography ==
=== Film ===
- Kay Dali Ng Kahapon, Ang Bagal ng Bukas (1985)
- Bagong Hari (1986)
- Paano Hahatiin ang Puso (1986)
- Mga Anghel ng Diyos (1986)
- Batas sa Aking Kamay (1987)
- Afuang (1988)
- Final Reprisal (1988)
- Tupang Itim (1989)

=== Television ===
Year	Title	Role	Ref.
1984–1987	Heredero		
1991–1996	That's Entertainment	Co-host	

== Awards and nominations ==
- 1984 Grand winner of Little Miss Philippines
- 1987 Nominated FAMAS Award Best Child Actress Paano Hahatiin ng Puso (1986)
- 1988 Won FAMAS Award Best Child Actress Batas Sa Aking Kamay (1987)
- 1989 Nominated FAMAS Award Best Child Actress Afuang (1988)
- 1990 Nominated FAMAS Award Best Child Actress Tupang Itim (1989)

== Personal life ==
Herradura married Bryant Agullo on March 5, 2002. They have two children together.
