= Snooky Serna =

Filipino actress (born 1966)

- Born: Maria Milagros Sumayao Serna; April 4, 1966 (age 60)
- Other names: Cookie, Kukay, Brooke Shields of the Philippines, Queen of Fantasy Movies, the Eternal Star
- Occupation: Actress
- Years active: 1970–present
- Spouse: Ricardo Cepeda (m. 1992; ann. 2006)
- Children: 2 daughters

Maria Milagros "Snooky" Sumayao Serna (born April 4, 1966) is a Filipino actress. Regarded as the "Eternal Star" by the local media, she is best known for her portrayals in Anak ni Waray, Anak ni Biday (1984), Blusang Itim (1986) and Rosa Mistica (1988).

With a career spanning over five decades, Serna is well respected. At the age of three, she made her debut in the film Wanted: Perfect Mother (1970) and earned recognition as a child actress. Launched as one of the original "Regal Babies," she became one of tinseltown's most bankable leading dramatic actresses in the 1980s. She attained commercial peak after top billing Blusang Itim, a fantasy-romance film which became one of the biggest box-office successes of 80s decade.

Serna has since received countless accolades in local and international scene. She notably won two awards for "Best Actress" and "Jury Award" at the 11th International Film Festival Manhattan in New York City, becoming the first Filipino actor to win two major awards at the film festival. She is also a recipient of three FAMAS Awards and three PMPC Star Awards for Movies, including several nominations from Gawad Urian Awards and FAP Awards.

== Early life ==
Being the daughter of actors Von Serna of Filipinos Spanish Ancestry and Mila Ocampo, she started acting early in life via her 1970 landmark debut Wanted: Perfect Mother, where she immediately captured the hearts of Filipino audience as a cute, sweet and smart-talking four-year-old. That same year she earned her first acting nomination from FAMAS Awards as Best Child Performer for the film My Little Angel.

Trained by acclaimed director and National Artist, Lino Brocka, Snooky showed promise as dramatic actress and later proved to be a fine one. In 1972, she won her first FAMAS Award as Best Child Actress for the film Sana Mahalin Mo Ako.

== Career ==
Serna was tapped by Regal Films to play the lead role in the movie, Katorse in 1980. Since she was not ready for mature roles then, she begged off, which eventually made a big star out of newcomer Dina Bonnevie. In her teens, she was launched as one of the original Regal Babies (a promotional term coined for a group of teen movie stars under contract with Filipino film production giant Regal Films) and groomed as a leading actress in various loveteam-inspired flicks with then heartthrobs Gabby Concepcion and Albert Martinez. She also starred in more daring films like Bata Pa si Sabel (1981), Strangers in Paradise (1983), Experience(1984), Teenage Marriage (1984) and Lilac (1985).

She starred in numerous films in the 1980s like Underage, Schoolgirls, Story of Three Loves and Anak ni Waray vs. Anak ni Biday, among others. In February 1986, she was cast in the lead role of the IBC television series Mansyon, which was the most expensive television production at the time. In the same month, she was given her first solo film project, an adaptation of the comic book serial Blusang Itim, which became a box office success. She was also the host of the television shows Always Snooky and Regal Drama Presents: Snooky on ABS-CBN.

As an actress, she tackled roles that earned acting nominations from various award-giving bodies. She was also in Kapag Napagod ang Puso (1988) with Christopher de Leon and Inagaw Mo ang Lahat sa Akin (Harvest Home - official Philippine entry to the 1995 Oscars) but unfortunately was snubbed during the awards night. Her other major films include Aabot Hanggang Sukdulan (1990), Yesterday, Today & Tomorrow (1986), Hahamakin ang Lahat (1990) with Vilma Santos, the fantasy films Rosa Mistica (1988), and Madonna: Ang Babaing Ahas (1991). It was with Koronang Itim (1994), that she finally won Best Lead Actress from FAMAS and Cebu Archdiocese Media Awards. She has starred in over 80 films from 1970 to 2004.

Serna was prodded to concentrate on family and motherhood in the late 1990s. Upon her comeback, her work mostly concentrated on TV. Initially, she had a short stint as a newscaster of IBC Express Balita and as a host for IBC-13's magazine show Travel and Trade.

=== Drama roles on television ===
More recently, she's been in various top-rating soap operas in rival stations GMA Network and ABS-CBN, notably Marina, Captain Barbell and Habang Kapiling Ka where she again was awarded the best actress trophy for TV drama performance from PMPC in 2003. Her recent films include Anak Ka ng Tatay Mo, Captain Barbell, and the still unreleased Bituin, Buwan at Araw with Nora Aunor.

Serna made a career turnaround during the late 90s when she concentrated on television and became a host of a tele-magazine show over IBC-13. She also became a newsreader over the same network delivering the mid- and early evening news. She also entered the corporate world by accepting the position of AVP for Megaworld Properties, Inc., and even started a film school in Cabanatuan City. But all endeavors were short-lived.

She is seen mostly on GMA Network and ABS-CBN.

=== Villainous roles on television ===
In 1997, Serna played the minor and anti-heroine role of Criselda V. Pereira in the ABS-CBN Primetime series Mula sa Puso, an accomplice sister of Selena (played by Princess Punzalan) who tries to convince her to take care of Magda's (played by Jaclyn Jose) daughter and keeps them separate, until she dies of cancer in the series, and the 2002, she played the anti-heroine role of Maida Ventaspejo in Kay Tagal Kang Hinintay in a special participation of their series.

In 2015, Serna is known for her antagonist roles in the GMA Drama series, since she played Mercedes Dela Paz in My Faithful Husband (2015) a mother of Emman (played by Dennis Trillo) who loathes her son from the product of rape and despises his wife, Mel (played by Jennylyn Mercado) to make her life miserable.

In both 2016, she played the main antagonist role as Deborah Villon in Poor Señorita (2016), a snobbish and rich woman as a mother of Piper (played by Valeen Montenegro and Edison (played by Elyson de Dios) who makes her niece Rita's (played by Regine Velasquez) life miserable to get whatever she wants to be more wealthiness, and she played the anti-heroine role of Laura Caraca-Labasat in Hahamakin ang Lahat (2016–2017) a loving and vengeful mother of Junjun (played by Kristofer Martin) to opposite with Joyce Ching, Ariel Rivera and Eula Valdez.

In 2019, she played the main antagonist role as Salida Saklang-Calliste in Sahaya (2019), a domineering and villainous mother of the late son's (played by Benjamin Alves) death that she was sworn her revenge against the poor badjao, Sahaya (played by Bianca Umali) and Manisan (played by Mylene Dizon) by making them alive in living hell.

In 2020, she played the good character role of Amelia "Amy" Malatamban, a loving mother of Ginalyn (played by Barbie Forteza in the remake television series Anak ni Waray vs. Anak ni Biday who is previous one of the four main characters, Susie along with her Underage co-star, the Diamond Star Ms. Maricel Soriano.

In both 2023, she played the new character of Velda Alcantara-Gatchalian, a cunning, ambitious, manipulative, and vengeful rich woman who makes the Serrano sisters' life miserable as she avenges her second son Leo's (played by Nikki Co) death in the remake television series, Underage who is previous one of the three leading roles, Corazon as the youngest of three sisters in the 1980 film at her age of 14, and she went back to ABS-CBN via Pira-Pirasong Paraiso to play another antagonist role Hon. Jacinda Sebastian, a corrupt judge that will make the Paraiso sisters life miserable, she's also reunited with her Underage co-star, the Diamond Star Ms. Maricel Soriano.

== Personal life ==
Serna was married to actor/model Ricardo Cepeda for over 12 years, with their marriage ending in annulment in January 2006. They have two daughters, Sam and Sachi. In 2024, Cepeda was released from the Cagayan Provincial Jail, in Tuguegarao after posting bail for estafa case. Her second husband was Nino Mendoza (artist and vocalist of a Filipino Rock band the Blue Jean Junkies) but they have been separated.

Serna has been a member of the religion, Iglesia ni Cristo, since 2011. Her parents Von and Mila are Roman Catholic and former Born-again Christians.

Serna's parents are Anthonio B. Serna "Von Serna" (1939–1994) of Filipino-Spanish Ancestry and Mila Ocampo or Milagros S. Serna, with grandparents Antonio Bon V. Serna and Maria Victoria S. Mercado. Her sibling is Anton Serna. She once lived with her aunt Eden at childhood. Since 2022, Serna was engaged to Ramon ‘Mon’ Villarama.

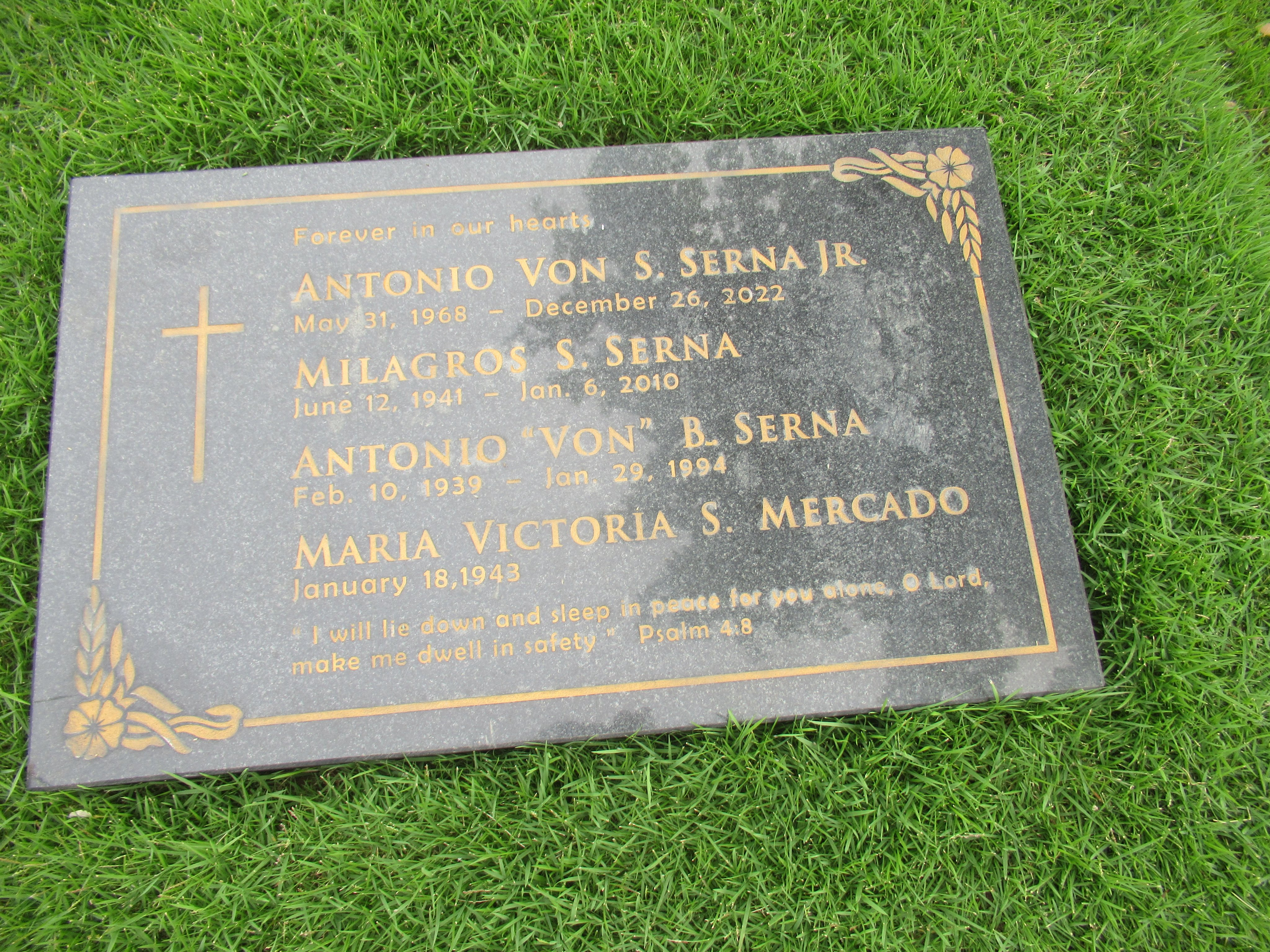
Serna's parent's grave (Anthonio B. Serna (Von Serna)-Mila Ocampo).

== Filmography ==
=== Film ===
Year	Title	Role
1970	Wanted: Perfect Mother	Neneng
1970	Twinkle, Twinkle, Little Star	
1970	My Little Angel	
1970	Sweethearts	
1970	Snooky	
1970	The Living Doll	
1970	Little Romeo and Juliet	
1971	I Love Mama, I Love Papa	
1971	My Heart Belongs to Daddy	
1971	The Wonderful World of Music	
1971	The Golden Child	
1972	Isinilang Ang Anak ng Ibang Babae	
1972	Mahalin Mo Sana Ako	
1973	Lalaki... Kasalanan Mo	
1973	Gigi	
1973	Little Solomon and Sheba	
1977	Tahan Na, Empoy, Tahan (Stop Crying Little Boy)	
1980	Underage	Corazon
1981	Bata Pa si Sabel	Isabelita "Sabel" Campos
1981	Age Doesn't Matter	
1981	First Love First Kiss	
1982	My Heart Belongs to Daddy	
1982	Mother Dear	
1982	Schoolgirls	
1982	Santa Claus Is Coming to Town!	
1983	To Mama with Love	
1983	Daddy Knows Best	
1983	Hello, Young Lovers	Paula Ledesma
1983	Stranger in Paradise	
1983	Experience	Jing-Jing
1984	Daddy's Little Darling	
1984	Don't Cry for Me Papa	
1984	Dear Mama	
1984	Teenage Marriage	
1984	Anak ni Waray, Anak ni Biday	
1984	Miracle of Love	
1984	Boystown	
1984	Where Love Has Gone	
1984	Minsan May Isang Mahal	
1985	Ride on Baby	
1985	Zuma	Galema
1985	Summer Love	
1985	Mga Kwento ni Lola Basyang	
1986	Yesterday, Today & Tomorrow	Vicky
1986	Blusang Itim	Jessa Escrito
1986	Payaso	
1986	The Graduates	
1986	Nasaan Ka Nang Kailangan Kita	
1986	Story of Three Loves	
1986	Summer Holiday	
1987	Forward March	Kristie
1987	Bakit Iisa ang Pag-Ibig?	
1987	Anak ni Zuma	
1988	Fly Me to the Moon	
1988	Stupid Cupid	
1988	Rosa Mistica	Rosalie Leynes/Rosanna Cabuyao/Rosario Karakol
1988	Nakausap Ko ang Birhen	Mary
1988	Kapag Napagod ang Puso	
1988	Lord, Bakit Ako Pa?	Merriam
1988	Sa Puso Ko Hahalik ang Mundo	
1988	Bukas Sisikat Din ang Araw	
1988	Lilac, Bulaklak ng Magdamag	
1989	Mga Kuwento ng Pag-Ibig	
1989	Abot Hanggang Sukdulan	Agnes
1989	Basag ang Pula	
1989	Once Upon a Time	
1989	Kontrobersyal	
1990	Kahit Isumpa Mo Ako	Angela
1990	Hahamakin ang Lahat	Theresa
1991	Madonna, ang Babaeng Ahas	Melinda/Madonna
1991	Joey Boy Munti, 15 Anyos Ka sa Muntilupa	Stella
1992	Yakapin Mo Ako Muli	Helen
1992	Lacson, Batas ng Navotas	
1992	The Cornelia Ramos Story	Cornelia Ramos
1993	Nasaan Ka Nang Kailangan Kita?	Kailan Dalawa ang Mahal
1994	Machete 2	Lai
1994	Koronang Itim	Adana De Guia
1994	Mancao	
1995	Inagaw Mo ang Lahat sa Akin (Harvest Home)	Clarita
1997	Paano Kung Wala Ka Na	
2001	Marital Rape	
2003	Captain Barbell	Belen
2004	Anak Ka ng Tatay Mo	
2008	Crossroads	Lucinda Querubin
2008	Paupahan	
2008	Eskandalo	
2009	Booking	Selya
2009	Bente	Jenny
2009	Fidel	Sister Lourdes
2009	Dukot	
2009	Hellphone	
2009	Sagrada Familia	
2012	Shake, Rattle and Roll Fourteen: The Invasion	Rosalda
2013	The Bride and the Lover	Gloria Albino
2015	You're Still The One	Melissa
2015	Felix Manalo	Pilar Manalo Danao
2018	The Significant Other	
2019	Last Fool Show	Sonya
2020	In the Name of the Mother	Carmen
2021	Princess DayaReese	Tita Sharon

=== Television / Digital Series ===
Year	Title	Role
1983	Teentime with Snooky and Albert	as herself
1986	Mansyon	
1987	Always, Snooky	as herself
1988	Regal Drama Hour: "Infidel"	Asun
1989	Regal Drama Presents: Snooky	varied roles
1991	Palibhasa Lalake	Becky
1991	Maalaala Mo Kaya: Bola	Lisa
1991	Maalaala Mo Kaya: For All We Know	Leonor
1993	Maalaala Mo Kaya: Bote at Yantok	Melanie
1994	Maalaala Mo Kaya: Eraser	Helen
1995	Maalaala Mo Kaya: Bilangguan	Lilia
1995	Ipaglaban Mo!	Openg
1997–1999	Mula sa Puso	Criselda V. Pereira
1999	Sa Sandaling Kailangan Mo Ako	Lucia
2000	IBC Express Balita	as herself
2001	Travel & Trade	as herself
2002	Kay Tagal Kang Hinintay	Maida Ventaspejo
2002	Magpakailanman: Mga Mata?	–
2002–2003	Habang Kapiling Ka	Olivia Malvarosa
2003	Maalaala Mo Kaya: The Fatima Soriano Story	–
2004	Marina	Esther Sto. Domingo
2004	Snooky Serna: In Persona	as herself
2005	Extra Challenge: Lagalag Sa Hong Kong	as herself
2005	Maalaala Mo Kaya: Mariposang Dagat	Magdalena
2006	Jeepney (Music Video)	as herself
2006–2007	Mars Ravelo's Captain Barbell	Mrs. B
2007	Magpakailanman: Kapag Naglaho Ang Gunita	
2007	Mahiwagang Baul: Alamat Ng Langgam	Panas
2007	Komiks: Da Adventures of Pedro Penduko	Casili
2007	La Vendetta	Janet Salumbides-Cardinale
2008	Sine Novela: Kaputol ng Isang Awit	Vina Monteza-Rivera
2011	Elena M. Patron's Blusang Itim	Loleng
2011–2012	Angelito: Batang Ama	Adel Dimaano
2012	Maalaala Mo Kaya: Ensaymada	Pion
2012	Maalaala Mo Kaya: Lubid	Baby
2012	Angelito: Ang Bagong Yugto	Adel Dimaano
2012	Wansapanataym: Kuryentina	Flory
2013	Kahit Konting Pagtingin	Faye Roxas
2013	It's Showtime	Herself / Guest Judge
2013	Maalaala Mo Kaya: Diploma	Rita
2013	Magpakailanman: The Heroes Dog Story Kabang	Cristina
2013	Genesis	Elena Santillan
2013	Maalaala Mo Kaya: Singsing	Emily
2014	Maalaala Mo Kaya: Bus	Episode Guest
2015	Maalaala Mo Kaya: Manika IV	uncredited
2015	Maalaala Mo Kaya: Computer Shop	uncredited
2015	My Faithful Husband	Mercedes "Cedes" Dela Paz
2015	Maalaala Mo Kaya: Spaghetti	Maritess
2016	Magpakailanman: Anak, Saan Kami Nagkamali?	Lourdes
2016	Dear Uge	Evelyn
2016	Poor Señorita	Deborah Villon
2016	Sinungaling Mong Puso	Clara's mother
2016	Magpakailanman: Finding Earl: The Dollente Family Story	Laurie
2016–2017	Hahamakin ang Lahat	Laura Caraca-Labsat
2017	Karelasyon: Biglang Yaman	
2017	Magpakailanman: The Kim Domingo Story	Filipina Domingo
2018	The One That Got Away	Fatima "Patty" Makalintal
2018	Dear Uge: Something Strange in the Neighborhood	
2018	Magpakailanman: Ang Babae Sa Likod ng Blusang Itim	Herself
2018	Pamilya Roces	Camilla Vera-Austria
2019	Sahaya	Salida Saklang-Calliste
2019	Dear Uge: Monito Monita	Mona
2020–2021	Anak ni Waray vs. Anak ni Biday	Amelia "Amy" Malatamban
2021	Stories From The Heart: Never Say Goodbye	Susan Kintanar
2023	Magpakailanman: Reyna ng Tahanan	Chanda
2023	Underage	Velda Alcantara-Gatchalian (formerly Guerrero)
2023	Magpakailanman: Ronda ng Kalsada	Chanda
2023	Magpakailanman: When I Fall in Laugh	Jessica
2023–2024	Pira-Pirasong Paraiso	Judge Jacinda Sebastian-La Madrid/ Hon. Jacinda Sebastian
2023	TiktoClock	Herself
2025	Wish Ko Lang!	
2025	My Father's Wife	Luzviminda "Minda" Rodriguez
2026	House of Lies	Evelyn Castillo

== Awards ==
INTERNATIONAL FILM FESTIVAL MANHATTAN, NEW YORK, U. S. A. (SPRING 2021) Best Performance By The Festival Grand Prize Winner In The Name Of The Mother

Best Actress In The Name Of The Mother

Year	Film or TV Title	Award	Category	Media
1972	Sana Mahalin Mo Ako	FAMAS	Best Child Actress	Film
1990	Hahamakin Ang Lahat	PMPC Star Awards for Movies	Best Supporting Actress	Film
1994	Koronang Itim	Cebu Archdiocese Mass Media Awards	Best Performance by Lead Actress	Film
1994	Koronang Itim	FAMAS	Best Performance by Lead Actress	Film
2003	Habang Kapiling Ka (TV)	PMPC Star Awards for TV	Best Drama Actress in a TV series	TV
2008	Paupahan (film)	FAMAS and PMPC Star Award	Best Supporting Actress	Film

== Nominations ==
=== Film ===
Year	Film	Body	Nomination	Remark
1970	My Little Angel	FAMAS	Child Performer	loss to Roderick Paulate
1972	Sana Mahalin Mo Ako	FAMAS	Child Performer	WON
1973	Gigi	FAMAS	Child Performer	loss to Jingle
1986	Yesterday, Today & Tomorrow	???	Supporting Actress	-
1987	Paano Kung Wala Ka Na?	FAMAS	Best Supporting Actress	-
1988	Kapag Napagod Ang Puso	Urian; PMPC Star; FAMAS; FAP	Lead Actress	-
1989	Aabot Hanggang Sukdulan	FAMAS	Lead Actress	-
1990	Hahamakin Ang Lahat	PMPC Star Awards, FAMAS	Supporting Actress	WON at Star Awards
1991	Madonna, Ang Babaing Ahas	???	Lead Actress	-
1994	Koronang Itim	FAMAS	Lead Actress	WON
1995	Inagaw Mo Ang Lahat Sa Akin (Harvest Home)	Film Academy of the Phil.; FAMAS; People's Choice	Lead Actress	loss to Nora Aunor
2003	Captain Barbell	Metro Manila Film Festival	Supporting Actress	-
2004	Anak Ka Ng Tatay Mo	Manila Film Festival	Lead Actress	loss to Nora Aunor (Naglalayag)

=== Television ===
Year	TV show	Body	Nomination	Remark
1987	Always, Snooky	PMPC Star Awards for TV	Best Musical Variety Show Host	loss to Vilma Santos and Nora Aunor
1988	Always, Snooky	PMPC Star Awards for TV	Best Musical Variety Show Host	loss to Vilma Santos
1989	Regal Drama Presents: Snooky	PMPC Star Awards for TV	Best Drama Actress in a TV series or anthology	
1990	Regal Drama Presents: Snooky	PMPC Star Awards for TV	Best Drama Actress in a TV series or anthology	
2003	Habang Kapiling Ka	PMPC Star Awards for TV	Best Drama Actress in a TV series	won

== Awards and nominations ==
Year	Category	Award	Result
1988	Best Supporting Actress	FAMAS Award	Nominated
1989	Best Actress	FAMAS Award	Nominated
1989	Best Actress	Gawad Urian Award	Nominated
1989	Best Actress	FAP	Nominated
