= Kitty Girl =

Kitty Girl may refer to:

== Music ==
- Kitty Girls, band
- Kitty Girls (album), a 2008 album by Kitty Girls
- "Kitty Girl", a 2017 song by RuPaul from American

== Other ==
- Kitty Girl (horse), only horse to have won E. P. Taylor Stakes twice (1957, 1958)
