= Gaano Kadalas ang Minsan =

Gaano Kadalas ang Minsan may refer to:

- "Gaano Kadalas ang Minsan" (song), a song originally sung by Basil Valdez
- Gaano Kadalas ang Minsan?, a 1982 Filipino film
- Gaano Kadalas ang Minsan (TV series), a 2008 Filipino television series
