= Init sa Magdamag =

Init sa Magdamag may refer to:

- Init sa Magdamag (film), a 1983 Philippine film
- Init sa Magdamag (TV series), a 2021 Philippine TV series
- Init sa Magdamag, a song by Sharon Cuneta and Nonoy Zuñiga
