= Jocelyn Oxlade =

Filipino-British singer, model and make up artist

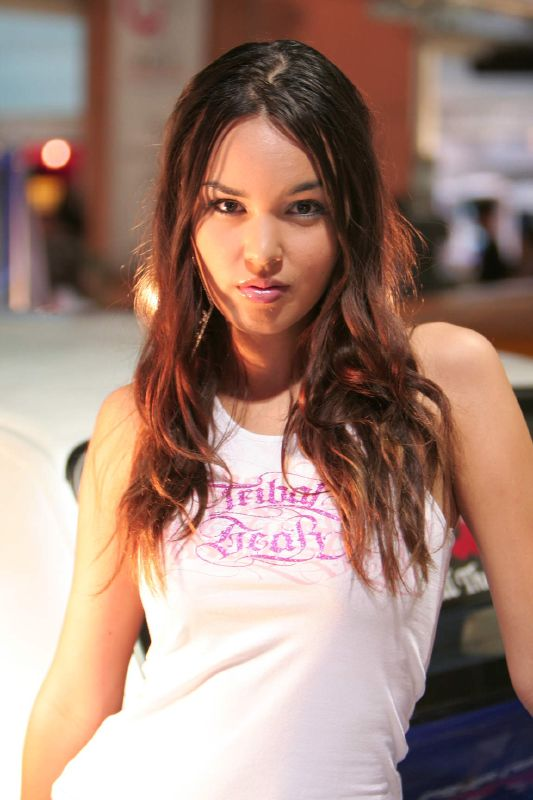
- Oxlade in 2006
- Born: Jocelyn Rose Oxlade (Note: Jocelyn Oxlade was born in England. Thus, she does not possess her mother's maiden name which is Matias.); 2 January 1984 (age 42); Brighton, East Sussex, England
- Occupations: Singer; songwriter; model; makeup artist
- Years active: 2006–2010; 2012
- Label: Star
- Spouse: Brandon Worley (m. 2014)
- Children: 1

Jocelyn Rose Oxlade (born 2 January 1984) is a Filipino-British singer, model and make up artist. She is a former member of the Kitty Girls.

== Career ==
As a child, Oxlade began modeling, joining pageants and participating in theatrical productions. Before moving into the Philippines she competed in Body Shots UK and Miss Philippines UK. On 10 March 2005, she defeated 25 ladies to represent the Philippines in the Miss Hawaiian Tropic International Pageant. She won the Miss Photogenic and Miss EarthCam Face awards in the 2005 Miss Hawaiian Tropic International Pageant held in Las Vegas, Nevada last 2 May 2005. She was offered a spread in Playboy magazine with a fee of $25,000 which she turned down.

In the Philippines, Oxlade worked as a model, doing projects for Fila, Kamiseta, and Avon, and fronted the all-girl singing group Kitty Girls. She, along with Ayanna Oliva, appeared in all incarnations of the group—originally a quintet with Nicole Deen, Veronica Scott and Tanya Yuquimpo, reduced to a trio when Yuquimpo and Deen left, and to a relaunched Kitty Girls with Khai Lim as their third member after Scott's departure.

Oxlade has appeared a couple of times in FHM Philippines and was on the cover of the January 2007 FHM Philippines issue with Gwen Garci, and on the cover of the FHM Philippines December 2007 issue with the rest of the Kitty Girls.

=== Personal life ===
Oxlade was born and raised in Brighton, East Sussex, the daughter of Filipina Zenaida (née Matias) and Englishman Nigel Oxlade. Oxlade lost her father at an early age to cancer. She and her two younger brothers were raised by their mother.

Oxlade's brother is Burgess Hill Rugby Football Club player and Philippines national rugby union team call up, Ashley Matias Heward.

Oxlade married US Marine Brandon Worley in October 2014 in Denmark. The couple have a daughter, Harley Rose Worley (born July 2015), and currently reside in Oceanside, California, with their dog Ryder.

== Filmography ==
Television
Year	Title	Role	Notes
2008	ASAP 08	Herself/host	
2009	Eat Bulaga!	Herself	
2009	Showtime	Herself/judge	Evicted after 1 week
2010	Magkano ang Iyong Dangal?	Monique	
2012	Ina, Kapatid, Anak		

== Discography ==
=== Guest appearances ===
Title	Year	Other performer(s)	Album
"Finding the Way Back"	2010	Nathan J	
