= Danny Zialcita =

Filipino filmmaker (1939–2013)

- Born: Danilo L. Zialcita; November 24, 1939; Manila, Commonwealth of the Philippines
- Died: March 10, 2013 (aged 73); Manila, Philippines
- Occupations: director, writer, producer
- Known for: Manong Danny
- Spouse: Leonor Vergara
- Children: Elizabeth Zialcita; Michael Zialcita

Danilo L. "Danny" Zialcita (November 24, 1939 – March 10, 2013) was a Filipino film director, writer and producer.

== Early life ==
Zialcita was born November 24, 1939, in Manila. During his long career where he made 52 films as director, 22 of which he wrote either the story or screenplay or both, Zialcita has explored various genres that included action, drama, suspense and comedy.

== Career ==
Some of Zialcita's films are Kapag tumabang ang asin (1976), Mga basag na kristal (1977), Anak sa una, kasal sa ina (1978), Parolado (1979), Tatlong bulaklak (1979), Nagalit ang Buwan sa Haba ng Gabi (1983) and May Lamok sa Loob ng Kulambo (1984). Zialcita made his directorial debut with Lady Killer (1965), starring the suave Romano Castellvi in the title role.

Although he is perhaps best known for Dear Heart (1981), the very first team-up of heartthrobs Sharon Cuneta and Gabby Concepcion, Zialcita had churned out several outstanding dramas way before 1981. These include Palos Strikes Again (1968), with Bernard Bonnin (the original Palos star), with whom he worked again in Bart Salamanca (1968) of the same year; films of the "bomba" genre like Gutom (1970) starring Rossana Marquez and Hidhid (1971) starring Rosanna Ortiz and Annabelle Rama; adult dramas like Lakaki, babae kami (1977), with Pinky de Leon, Chanda Romero, Janet Bordon, Alona Alegre, George Estregan, Eddie Garcia, Raoul Aragonn and Tommy Abuel; Hindi sa iyo ang mundo, Baby Porcuna (1978), topbilled by Beth Bautista, with Joseph Sytangco, Dick Israel, Anthony Alonzo, Josephine Garcia, Suzanne Gonzales; Ikaw at ang gabi (1979) with Dindo Fernando, Chanda Romero, Ronaldo Valdez and Beth Bautista; Kaladkarin (1980) with Jean Saburit in her first lead role, supported by Eddie Garcia, Suzanne Gonzales and George Estregan; and Langis at tubig (1980) with Vilma Santos, Dindo Fernando, Amy Austria, Ruben Rustia, Greg Lozano, Suzanne Gonzales, George Estregan, Ronaldo Valdez and Vic Silayan.

He was also noted for homosexual-themed fare like Si malakas si maganda at si mahinhin (1980), starring Elizabeth Oropesa, Alma Moreno, Dindo Fernando, George Estregan, Rudy Fernandez, Leonor Vergara, Mario Escudero and Mary Walter; Mahinhin vs. mahinhin (1981) with Dindo Fernando and Ronaldo Valdez in drag, costarring Edu Manzano, Carmi Martin, Dante Rivero and Pinky de Leon; Lalakwe (1985) starring Ronaldo Valdez, with Gloria Diaz, Rio Locsin, Tommy Abuel, Lyka Ugarte, Chanda Romero, Michael de Mesa, Eddie Arenas, Odette Khan, Lucita Soriano, Virginia Montes and Suzanne Gonzales; and the controversial cult classic T-Bird at Ako (1982), considered the landmark team-up of ultimate rivals Nora Aunor and Vilma Santos. Where in the hand of a lesser auteur the portrayal of gay people, transvestites, bisexuals and the like would be stereotyped caricatures, Zialcita directed such fare with class and panache.

Timely with today's proliferation of video scandals, Zialcita directed, seemingly with foresight about society's voyeuristic tendencies, The Betamax Story (1981), starring Vilma Santos, with Pinky de Leon, Cherie Gil, Alma Moreno, Jean Saburit, Chichay, Elizabeth Oropesa, George Estregan and Beth Bautista. He was also famous for films with kilometric and naughty titles; witness Nang masugatan ang gabi (1984), Hawakan mo at pigilan ang kanahon (1984), May daga sa labas ng lungga (1984), Menudo at pandesal (1985) starring Gloria Diaz, Carmi Martin, Tanya Gomez, Janice de Belen, Paquito Diaz, Max Alvarado, Lou Veloso and Caridad Sanchez; Bakit manipis ang ulap (1985) with Chanda Romero, Laurice Guillen, Tommy Abuel, Mark Gil and Janice de Belen; and Bakit madalas ang tibok ng puso? (1986), featuring the then-popular love team of Aga Muhlach and Janice de Belen, costarring Dante Rivero, Liza Lorena, Laurice Guillen, Anita Linda, Isabel Granada, Odette Khan, Johnny Vicar and Joonee Gamboa. Zialcita would go on to direct Cuneta for the second and last time in To Love Again (1983), the title based on a song written by Odette Quesada, which also marked the film debut of Miguel Rodriguez. He worked a second time with Concepcion in what would turn out to be his swan song, Bakit iisa ang pag-ibig (1987), which starred Snooky Serna.

Historians, film critics and the stars themselves attested that Zialcita liked his movie characters well-dressed, and the term "glossy melodrama" was famously coined for him in the 1980s. While Brocka's films chronicled poverty, squalor and struggle, Zialcita's movies were often about the well-heeled and their neuroses and quirks. His leading ladies often wore outlandish dresses and beautiful hats for scenes that would become the "Zialcita trademark."

Plans were afoot for Zialcita to direct again, before his untimely demise in March of this year. In a 2009 interview with Jerome Gomez for Metro Him magazine of ABS-CBN Publishing, Zialcita was all set to reprise Dear Heart (1981) (maybe with new actors), and he wanted to direct Sharon Cuneta and daughter KC Concepcion together, probably with John Lloyd Cruz as Concepcion's love interest. Zialcita and Gabby Concepcion's father were also touching base to develop a film for Gabby, in the vein of The Thorn Birds (1983 American TV mini-series).

Zialcita received the Best Screenplay award from the Filipino Academy of Movie Arts and Sciences (FAMAS) for his collaboration with Tom Adrales on Gaano kadalas ang minsan? (1982). He was cited by the Metro Manila Film Festival (MMFF) for Best Story, for Langis at tubig (1980). He was nominated by URIAN twice for screenplay and direction, for Hindi sa iyo ang mundo, Baby Porcuna (1978) and Ikaw at ang gabi (1979). The FAMAS nominated him four times as best director, Hindi sa iyo ang mundo, Baby Porcuna (1978), Langis at tubig (1980), Gaano kadalas ang minsan? (1982) and Bakit manipis ang ulap (1985), and once as Best Scriptwriter for Nang masugatan ang gabi (1984).

== Death ==
Zialcita died on March 10, 2013, after suffering a stroke. He was 73 years old.

== Awards ==
=== FAMAS Awards ===
Year	Result	Award	Category/Recipient
1979	Nominated	FAMAS Award	Best Director for: Hindi sa iyo ang mundo, Baby Porcuna (1978)
1981	Nominated	FAMAS Award	Best Director for: Langis at Tubig (1980)
1983	Won	FAMAS Award	Best Screenplay for: Gaano Kadalas Ang Minsan? (1982) shared with: Tom Adrales
1983	Nominated	FAMAS Award	Best Director for: Gaano Kadalas Ang Minsan? (1982)
1984	Nominated	FAMAS Award	Best Director for: Nagalit Ang Buwan Sa Haba ng Gabi (1983)
1985	Nominated	FAMAS Award	Best Director for: Nang Masugatan Ang Gabi (1984)
1986	Nominated	FAMAS Award	Best Director for: Bakit Manipis Ang Ulap? (1985)

=== Gawad Urian Awards ===
Year	Result	Award	Category/Recipient
1979	Nominated	Gawad Urian Awards	Best Direction (Pinakamahusay na Direksyon) for: Hindi Sa Iyo Ang Mundo, Baby Porcuna (1978)
1979	Nominated	Gawad Urian Awards	Best Screenplay (Pinakamahusay na Dulang Pampelikula) for: Hindi Sa Iyo Ang Mundo, Baby Porcuna (1978)
1980	Nominated	Gawad Urian Awards	Best Direction (Pinakamahusay na Direksyon) for: Ikaw At Ang Gabi (1979)
1980	Nominated	Gawad Urian Awards	Best Screenplay (Pinakamahusay na Dulang Pampelikula) for: Ikaw At Ang Gabi (1979)

=== Metro Manila Film Festival ===
Year	Result	Award	Category/Recipient
1980	Won	Festival Prize	Best Story for: Langis at Tubig (1980)

=== Cinema One Original ===
Year	Result	Award	Category/Recipient
2009	Won	Cinema One Originals Awards	Special Honorary Award

== Filmography ==
=== Director ===
Title	Year
Lady Killer	1965
Masquerade	1967
Palos Strikes Again	1968
Bart Salamanca	1968
Ina Ko Patawarin Mo Ako Ako'y Nagugutom	1970
Gutom	1970
Tres Pistoleros	1970
Hidhid	1971
Polyanna	1972
Ito'y Isang Baliw na Baliw na Daigdig	1975
Laging Umaga	1975
Gumapang Ka Sa Lupa	1975
Ang Biyuda ay Misteryosa	1975
Katas ng Langis	1976
Kapag Tumabang Ang Asin	1976
Escolta; Mayo 13; Biyernes ng Hapon!	1976
Mga Basag ng Kristal	1977
Lalaki, Babae Kami	1977
Anak Sa Una, Kasal Sa Ina	1978
Hindi Sa Iyo Ang Mundo, Baby Porcuna	1978
Pretty Boy Segovia	1978
Kulang Sa Init, Kulang Sa Lamig	1978
Parolado	1979
Tatlong Bulaklak	1979
Ikaw At Ang Gabi	1979
Si Malakas, Si Maganda, at Si Mahinhin	1980
Ang Kabiyak	1980
Kaladkarin	1980
Langis at Tubig	1980
Mahinhin vs. Mahinhin	1981
Dear Heart	1981
The Betamax Story	1981
Karma	1981
Tinimbang Ang Langit	1982
T-Bird at Ako	1982
Gaano Kadalas ang Minsan?	1982
Palabra de Honor	1983
To Love Again	1983
Nagalit ang Buwan sa Haba ng Gabi	1983
Nang Masugatan Ang Gabi	1984
Hawakan Mo at Pigilan Ang Kahapon	1984
May Lamok sa Loob ng Kulambo	1984
May Daga sa Labas ng Lungga	1984
Lalakwe	1984
Sugat Sa Dangal	1985
Heartache City	1985
Bakit Manipis Ang Ulap?	1985
Menudo at Pandesal	1985
Always In My Heart	1986
Always and Forever	1986
Bakit Madalas Ang Tibok ng Puso?	1986
Bakit Iisa Ang Pag-Ibig?	1987

=== Writer ===
Title	Year
Lady Killer	1965
Ina Ko Patawarin Mo Ako'y Nagugutom	1970
Ito'y Isang Baliw na Baliw na Daigdig	1975
Hindi Sa Iyo Ang Mundo, Baby Porcuna	1978
Topo-Topo Barega	1978
Ikaw At Ang Gabi	1979
Ang Kabiyak	1980
Langis at Tubig	1980
Mahinhin vs. Mahinhin	1981
Dear Heart	1981
Tinimbang Ang Langit	1982
Gaano Kadalas Ang Minsan?	1982
Palabra De Honor	1983
Nagalit Ang Buwan Sa Haba ng Gabi	1983
May Daga Sa Labas ng Lungga	1984
Lalakwe	1984
Sugat Sa Dangal	1985
Heartache City	1985
Bakit Manipis Ang Ulap?	1985
Bakit Madalas Ang Tibok ng Puso?	1986
Bakit Iisa Ang Pag-Ibig?	1987

=== TV Writer ===
Title	Network	Year
Gaano Kadalas Ang Minsan?	GMA Network	2008

=== Producer ===
Title	Year
Lalakwe	1985
Heartache City	1985

=== Executive producer ===
Title	Year
May Lamok sa Loob ng Kulambo	1984
May Daga Sa Labas ng Lungga	1984
