= Dagsin =

2019 film

- Directed by: Atom Magadia
- Screenplay by: Atom Magadia; Anne Prado-Magadia
- Story by: Atom Magadia
- Produced by: Atom Magadia; Anne Prado-Magadia; Ferdinand Lapuz
- Starring: Tommy Abuel; Lotlot DeLeon; Benjamin Alves; Janine Guttierez
- Cinematography: Dexter Dela Peña
- Edited by: Jay Ramirez
- Music by: Robert Yulo
- Release dates: 6 August 2016 (Cínemalayà: Philippine Independent Film Festival); 20 April 2019
- Running time: 119 minutes
- Country: Philippines
- Languages: Filipino; Tagalog

Dagsin is a 2016 Filipino drama film directed by Atom Magadia. It was shortlisted as a potential entry by the Philippines for the Best International Feature Film at the 92nd Academy Awards.

== Cast ==
- Tommy Abuel as Justino
- Lotlot De Leon as Mercy
- Benjamin Alves as Young Justino
- Janine Gutierrez as Young Corazon
- Sue Prado as Grace
