= Dindo Fernando =

Filipino actor (1940–1987)

- Born: Jose Tacorda Chua Surban; November 19, 1940; Virac, Catanduanes, Philippines
- Died: August 27, 1987 (aged 46)
- Education: Colegio de San Juan de Letran; Far Eastern University; University of the East (MBA)
- Occupation: Actor
- Years active: 1960s–1987

Dindo Fernando (born Jose Tacorda Chua Surban; November 19, 1940 – August 27, 1987) was a Filipino film and television actor. He began his career as a matinee idol associated with Sampaguita Pictures and its group of performers known as “Stars ’66”, before becoming known principally for dramatic roles. His performance in Ikaw at ang Gabi received the Gawad Urian Award for Best Actor, while his role in Langis at Tubig earned Best Actor awards from the Metro Manila Film Festival and the FAMAS Awards.

== Early life and education ==
Fernando was born Jose Tacorda Chua Surban on November 19, 1940, in Virac, Catanduanes. A 2020 profile in The Philippine Star identified his home community as Salvacion in Virac.

He attended the Colegio de San Juan de Letran, Far Eastern University and the University of the East. According to a retrospective published by The Philippine Star, he completed a Master of Business Administration degree at the University of the East.

== Career ==
During the 1960s, Fernando was one of the performers promoted by Sampaguita Pictures as “Stars ’66”. The group also included Gina Pareño, Rosemarie Sonora, Pepito Rodriguez, Ramil Rodriguez, Bert Leroy Jr., Loretta Marquez and other young contract performers. Among Fernando's more serious films for the studio was 4 ang Anak ni David, in which he appeared with Eddie Garcia, Luis Gonzales, Eddie Gutierrez and Bert Leroy Jr.

After becoming a freelance actor, Fernando concentrated on dramatic films. His credits included Ikaw at ang Gabi, Langis at Tubig, Mortal, Init sa Magdamag, Baby Tsina, Gaano Kadalas ang Minsan? and Muling Buksan ang Puso. He received the Gawad Urian Award for Best Actor for Ikaw at ang Gabi.

Fernando played Bobby Jarlego in the 1980 marital drama Langis at Tubig, directed by Danny Zialcita. The role earned him Best Actor at the 1980 Metro Manila Film Festival and a FAMAS Award for Best Actor.

On television, Fernando was known for portraying Major Leo Alicante, the father of the title character played by Janice de Belen, in the RPN drama series Flordeluna. He also appeared with Tony Santos Sr. in The Dindo–Tony Show. A 2013 retrospective in the Philippine Daily Inquirer described Fernando as the most successful male dramatic actor to emerge from the Stars ’66 group and noted his extensive work on Flordeluna.

== Death ==
Fernando died on August 27, 1987, at the age of 46.

== Selected filmography ==
The following is a selection of Fernando's film credits.

Year	Film
1970	Guerilla Strike Force
1972	Black Mama, White Mama
1974	Fe, Esperanza, Caridad
1977	Pacific Inferno
1978	Bomba Star
1979	Ikaw at ang Gabi
1980	Langis at Tubig
1981	Mahinhin vs. Mahinhin
1982	Gaano Kadalas ang Minsan?
1983	Init sa Magdamag
1983	Nagalit ang Buwan sa Haba ng Gabi
1984	Baby Tsina
1985	Muling Buksan ang Puso
1986	Magdusa Ka!
1986	Gabi Na, Kumander
1987	Alabok sa Ulap

== Accolades ==
Year	Award	Category	Work	Result
1980	Gawad Urian Awards	Best Actor	style="background: #9EFF9E; color: #000; vertical-align: middle; text-align: center; " class="yes table-yes2 notheme"|Won	
1980	Metro Manila Film Festival	Best Actor	Langis at Tubig| style="background: #9EFF9E; color: #000; vertical-align: middle; text-align: center; " class="yes table-yes2 notheme"|Won	
1981	FAMAS Awards	Best Actor| style="background: #9EFF9E; color: #000; vertical-align: middle; text-align: center; " class="yes table-yes2 notheme"|Won	Langis at Tubig| style="background: #9EFF9E; color: #000; vertical-align: middle; text-align: center; " class="yes table-yes2 notheme"|Won	
