= Bituing Walang Ningning (film) =

1985 musical drama film by Emmanuel H. Borlaza

- Official movie poster
- Directed by: Emmanuel Borlaza; Leroy Salvador (Note: Attributed to this reference:)
- Written by: Orlando R. Nadres
- Based on: Bituing Walang Ningning by Nerissa Cabral
- Produced by: Ramon Salvador
- Starring: Sharon Cuneta; Christopher de Leon; Cherie Gil
- Cinematography: Romy Vitug
- Edited by: Edgardo Jarlego
- Music by: Willy Cruz
- Production company: Viva Films
- Distributed by: Viva Films
- Release date: February 14, 1985
- Running time: 126 minutes
- Country: Philippines
- Language: Filipino (Note: contains some English dialogue especially during the conversation of Dorina Pineda, Nico Escobar and Lavinia Arguelles, and also while Dorina sings on stage)

Bituing Walang Ningning (English: A Star Without Shine) is a 1985 Philippine musical drama film directed by Emmanuel Borlaza from a komiks serial written by Nerissa G. Cabral and adapted into a screenplay by Orlando R. Nadres. The film stars Sharon Cuneta, Christopher de Leon, and Cherie Gil, with the supporting cast includes Tommy Abuel, Jay Ilagan, Joel Torre, and Chanda Romero.

Produced and distributed by Viva Films, it was theatrically released on February 14, 1985. In 2019, the film was digitally restored and remastered by Central Digital Lab.

== Plot ==
Dorina Pineda, a sampaguita seller, is a devoted fan of famous singer Lavinia Arguelles, who goes to watch her concerts, even running on stage to give her flowers, and waiting outside her venues to see and talk to her. Unbeknownst to her fans, Lavinia has an inflated ego and a cold and calculating personality that slowly drives away her boyfriend, Nico Escobar. One day, Dorina's singing talents are discovered, and she becomes Lavina's industry rival, with Nico supporting and falling for Dorina. After Lavinia calls Dorina "nothing but a second-rate, trying hard copycat", Dorina finally sees her idol's true personality. As she continues to become famous, Dorina becomes doubtful over whether she is delighted.

In the final scene, instead of going through with a concert showdown with Lavinia, Dorina announces that she is leaving show business and that this would be her last performance. While singing "Bituing Walang Ningning", Dorina calls Lavinia on stage and passes the microphone to her, then gives her flowers the same way she had done when she was just a fan. Dorina leaves Lavinia to continue singing on stage as she reunites with Nico.

== Cast ==
- Sharon Cuneta as Dorina Pineda
- Christopher de Leon as Nico Escobar
- Cherie Gil as Lavinia Arguelles
- Jay Ilagan as Zosimo Blanco
- Tommy Abuel as Larry Calma
- Joel Torre as Garry Diaz
- Chanda Romero as Edith
- Lorli Villanueva as Tiya Sioning

== Production ==
The film was the pet project of Mina Aragon, wife of Viva Films founder-executive producer Vic R. Del Rosario Jr.

=== Casting ===
The role of Lavinia was offered to the then-up-and-coming singer Zsa Zsa Padilla as her film acting debut. She declined due to her friendship with Sharon Cuneta. Padilla would later star in the 2006 television adaptation as Dorina's mother, a character that does not exist in the film.

=== Filming ===
During filming, Sharon Cuneta, newly married to Gabby Concepcion, was pregnant with her first child, KC Concepcion. The production crew made efforts to conceal her pregnancy, including using props and body doubles, as well as utilizing half-body shots.

Halfway through shooting, director Emmanuel Borlaza suffered a heart attack and was told to rest. Leroy Salvador, who directed Cuneta in Sa Hirap at Ginhawa, also for Viva Films, was assigned to direct the unfinished sequences. He asked not to be credited for his work. The same year, Salvador directed Cuneta and Gil in another musical for Viva Films, Sana'y Wala Nang Wakas, released on July 30.

The iconic line "You're nothing but a second-rate, trying hard copycat" was originally written in the script as "You're nothing but a good imitator." The original line was later changed to its well-known one when Tommy Abuel suggested the word "copycat", which sounded "catchy" by Cherie Gil, who later added the phrase "trying hard".

The final scene, a concert showdown between Lavinia and Dorina, was filmed at the Metropolitan Theater.

=== Music ===
The theme song "Bituing Walang Ningning" was performed by Sharon Cuneta, with melody and lyrics written by Willy Cruz.

== Release ==
The film was released in theaters on Valentine's Day in 1985.

At the 2019 QCinema International Film Festival, Bituing Walang Ningning was screened as part of a Viva Classics presentation in recognition of Vic del Rosario, Jr.'s contributions to the Filipino film industry. A Special Life Achievement Award was presented to Del Rosario at the festival.

=== Legacy ===
The line, "You are nothing but a second-rate, trying hard copycat!" spoken by Cherie Gil's character Lavinia Arguelles to Sharon Cuneta's Dorina Pineda, is considered iconic by Filipino culture critics. It was used in both the television and stage adaptations, and has remained closely associated with Gil. The film and the line established Gil as the Filipino film industry's "La Primera Contravida".

The lines "Balutin mo ako ng hiwaga ng iyong pagmamahal" (Wrap me in the magic of your love) in the film's theme song "Bituing Walang Ningning" also became famous in Filipino popular culture as a reference to the practice of taking home food from buffets and special occasions. This also led to the creation of the Tagalog verb Mag-Sharon (To Sharon) in reference to the practice.

== Adaptations ==
In 2006, the story was adapted as a primetime television drama of the same name by ABS-CBN starring Sarah Geronimo, Ryan Agoncillo, and Angelika de la Cruz. During its run, it was the highest-rated television drama of ABS-CBN. The final scene of the television drama was filmed as a special concert showdown in front of a live audience at Araneta Coliseum.

In 2015, an award-winning stage adaptation entitled "Bituing Walang Ningning: The Musical", written and directed by Freddie Santos, premiered at the Newport Performing Arts Theater at Resorts World Manila. The original cast starred Cris Villonco, Mark Bautista, and Monica Cuenco. The production featured 11 songs by Willy Cruz, including the film's original song "Bituing Walang Ningning". It received seven awards, including the award for Best Musical Production, at the 28th Aliw Awards.
