= Magkano ang Iyong Dangal? (TV series) =

Philippine romantic drama television series

- Title card
- Genre: Drama, Romance
- Created by: Gilda Olvidado
- Based on: Magkano ang Iyong Dangal? by Gilda Olvidado; Magkano ang Iyong Dangal? by Laurice Guillen
- Developed by: ABS-CBN Studios
- Written by: Gilbeys Sardea; Clarissa Estuar; Janice O'Hara; Kay Brondial; Willy Laconsay (Headwriter)
- Directed by: Chito S. Roño
- Starring: Bangs Garcia; Rayver Cruz; Sid Lucero
- Ending theme: "Dahil Mahal na Mahal Kita" by Zsa Zsa Padilla
- Composer: Larry Hermoso
- Country of origin: Philippines
- Original language: Filipino
- No. of episodes: 77

Production
- Executive producers: Carlo Katigbak; Cory Vidanes; Laurenti Dyogi; Raymond Dizon
- Producer: Desirey Fernandez-Juan
- Production location: Metro Manila
- Editors: Dennis Salgado; Judy Anne Buenaventura; Ludwig Peralta; Mayette Manlutac
- Running time: 30-45 minutes
- Production companies: Dreamscape Entertainment Television; Seiko Films

Original release
- Network: ABS-CBN
- Release: January 25 – May 14, 2010

Gilda Olvidado's Magkano ang iyong Dangal? (lit. 'How Much is your Dignity?') is a 2010 Philippine television drama romantic series broadcast by ABS-CBN. The series is based on the 1988 Philippine film of the same title. Directed by Chito S. Roño, it stars Bangs Garcia, Rayver Cruz and Sid Lucero. It aired on the network's Hapontastic line up and worldwide on TFC from January 25 to May 14, 2010, replacing Nagsimula sa Puso and was replaced by Rosalka.

It is also the first film to TV remake to use Gilda Olvidado's storywork for the network under her helm.

The series is currently airing on Kapamilya Online Live and Jeepney TV Channel weekdays.

== Overview ==
=== Original film ===
Magkano ang Iyong Dangal? was a 1989 film produced and released by Seiko Films. It starred Christopher de Leon as Paolo, Zsa Zsa Padilla as Era, and Joel Torre as Larry, with Jestoni Alarcon, Princess Punzalan, and Michael Locsin. It was written by Gilda Olvidado and directed by Laurice Guillen.

=== Production ===
ABS-CBN bought Magkano ang Iyong Dangal? in 2007 from Seiko Films as part of Sineserye Presents. The main role was first offered to Kris Aquino then later given to Roxanne Guinoo.

In a November 2009 episode of SNN: Showbiz News Ngayon, the series was announced to star Roxanne Guinoo, Rayver Cruz, and Sid Lucero and to be directed by Chito Rono, with the tentative title Mahal Na Mahal Kita.

On ABS-CBN's Trade Show for 2010, it was announced that the final title is Magkano ang Iyong Dangal? and it is a remake of the 1989 film with the same title.

In December 2009, the management decided to give the main role to Bangs Garcia, because of some unsettled issues with Guinoo.

== Synopsis ==
Nilo (Sid Lucero) and Carmela's (Bangs Garcia) love will be tested by problems and challenges surrounding their families. They will be separated temporarily by circumstances beyond their control, but fate will bring them back together again.

Nilo and Carmela’s love is put to the ultimate test as they confront the consequences of their past. The arrival of Troy (Rayver Cruz) an old friend with a hidden agenda threatens their future when he manipulates circumstances to drive a wedge between them.

== Cast and characters ==
=== Main cast ===
- Bangs Garcia as Carmela Martirez-Morales - She was raised by her loving Mother Rodora. Carmela grew up to be a very obedient daughter to her Mother. She's a self-sacrificing, hard working and a very kind girl who dreams of having a complete family. Nilo is her one and only love. He's the only man who has tried to save her in any possible way. She will do anything to fight for their love and along the way Carmela will learn that for the love of her life she will give up even her honor— this is the real meaning of true love.
- Karylle as Tanya Almeda- a new character was introduced at the middle part of the soap. Tanya is an environmentalist seeking justice for her boyfriend who was framed up and killed. She will meet Nilo as she conducts her investigation regarding a company violating environmental laws and involved in framing up her boyfriend. She will help Nilo to prove his innocence and do whatever it takes to protect him. A thing which she was not able to do with his boyfriend.
- Rayver Cruz as Troy Sandoval - The son of Esther. He grew up with a deep longing for affection and attention from his Mother and Sibling. When he was young he was friends with Carmela and Nilo and finally found in Carmela the love he wanted to receive from his family. When Carmela left him he felt rejected and soon his love for Carmela turned into obsession. He returned from the U.S totally changed; he became suave and sophisticated with a reputation of being a risk taker on the business. He has only one intention—to win Carmela back.
- Sid Lucero as Nilo Morales - Growing up with Dioning, who did nothing but blame him for every misfortune they encountered, Nilo learned to be self-reliant at an early age. Although he tends to be naughty and proud he's also good in school and always gets high grades. Nilo is ambitious and he yearns to be rich so that he could be a good provider to his family; so he would not have to depend on other people again. His one true love is Carmela. From Carmela he will realize the real meaning of love that it is just about fulfilling the other person's dreams. Love is giving that other person your whole self without inhibitions.

=== Supporting cast ===
- Nikki Valdez as Liezette
- Bing Pimentel as Esther Sandoval
- Paw Diaz as Diane
- Beverly Salviejo as Dioning
- Martin del Rosario as Biboy
- Bettina Carlos as Alona Sandoval
- Debraliz Borres as Saling
- Rico Barrera as Edwin
- Jocelyn Oxlade as Monique
- Dick Israel as George Almeda
- Erika Padilla as Jenny

=== Extended cast ===
- Christopher Roxas as Barry Abarrientos
- Jake Roxas as Andrew Marquez
- Mylene Dizon as Rita Robles

=== Special participation ===
- Emilio Garcia as Roman Sandoval
- Mickey Ferriols as Rodora Martinez
- Ella Cruz as Young Carmela
- Makisig Morales as Young Nilo
- Joshua Dionisio as Young Troy
- Jane Oineza as Young Alona
- Enola Alvarez as Young Tanya

=== Guest cast ===
- Tom Olivar
- Reb Sibal
- Jubail Andres
- Manuel Chua
- Raymond Concepcion
- Jacq Yu
- Neil Ryan Sese as Lt. Reyes

== Reruns ==
The show began airing reruns on Jeepney TV from August 19 to October 11, 2024. At the second time of the rerun of the teleserye, Kapamilya Online Live rerun it for the first time and in the second time of Jeepney TV started from September 28 to November 20, 2026 on weekdays.

== Reception ==
The television series remake was conceived to change the revivals names and story plot from the 1989 version which was directed by Laurice Guillen the plot was conceived from the original storyline to present day times.

=== Launch ===
Magkano ang Iyong Dangal was launched as one of the ABS-CBN offering for the 60th celebration of Filipino Soap Opera (Ika-60 taon ng Pinoy Soap Opera). Together with upcoming series such as Rubi, Kung Tayo'y Magkakalayo, Habang May Buhay, Kokey at Ako, Tanging Yaman, Agua Bendita, and a series of Precious Hearts Romances Presents seasonal episodes. The shows were launched during the ABS-CBN Trade Launch for the first quarter of 2010, entitled Bagong Simula (New Beginning).

== See also ==
- List of programs broadcast by ABS-CBN
- List of ABS-CBN Studios original drama series
- List of programs broadcast by Jeepney TV
