= Nagalit ang Buwan sa Haba ng Gabi =

1983 drama film by Danny L. Zialcita

- Theatrical release poster
- Directed by: Danny L. Zialcita
- Written by: Danny L. Zialcita
- Produced by: Hirene Lopez; Danny L. Zialcita
- Starring: Laurice Guillen; Gloria Diaz; Dindo Fernando; Eddie Garcia; Janice de Belen
- Cinematography: Felizardo Bailen
- Edited by: Enrique Jarlego Sr. (Note: Supervising film editor); George Jarlego
- Music by: Philip Monserrat
- Production company: Essex Films
- Distributed by: Essex Films; ABS-CBN Film Productions (restored version)
- Release date: August 11, 1983
- Running time: 122 minutes
- Country: Philippines
- Languages: Filipino; English

Nagalit ang Buwan sa Haba ng Gabi (English: A Tired, Angry Moon on a Restless Night) is a 1983 Filipino drama film written, co-produced, and directed by Danny Zialcita. A tale of marital and extramarital fiascoes, the story follows a typical love polygon between an adulterous man and the two women in his life: a long-suffering and problematic wife, who is also having an affair with her ex-boyfriend, and a mistress who leaves her husband after learning his relationship with another man. The film stars Dindo Fernando, Laurice Guillen, Janice de Belen, Eddie Garcia, and Gloria Diaz, with the supporting cast includes Liza Lorena, Suzanne Gonzales, Tommy Abuel, Michael de Mesa, and Odette Khan.

Produced and distributed by Essex Films, the film was theatrically released on August 4, 1983. In 2016, the film was digitally restored and remastered by ABS-CBN Film Restoration and premiered as part of the 12th Cinema One Originals Film Festival.

== Plot ==
At a lavish party in the household of Stella and Dimitri de Joya, a random man named Johnny showed up and showed a letter he received from the latter, believing it to be a blackmail attempt. The next day, Dimitri met Johnny again to buy back the letters for a requested sum, warning the latter that he would shoot him if he showed up again. However, when Stella finds a letter from Dimitri's lover, Joey, and learns that he is gay, she becomes enraged and leaves him. After she abandons him, she spends her time alone at home and at the seaside outside Metro Manila until she meets Miguel Almeda, a married man with two children, and they fall in love.

Meanwhile, Tony, a young college student, meets Jenny, who reimburses him (the money came from her father, whom she asked for) for having destroyed his car's window while she and her brother Joseph were playing baseball a few days earlier.

== Cast ==
- Dindo Fernando as Miguel Almeda: The patriarch who had two women in his life: his wife and the mistress.
- Laurice Guillen as Delza Almeda: The matriarch who also committed an affair.
- Gloria Diaz as Stella de Joya: Miguel's mistress and Dimitri's wife.
- Eddie Garcia as Dimitri de Joya: Stella's husband who had a past of having relations with men.
- Janice de Belen as Jenny Almeda: The daughter of Delza and Miguel
- Tommy Alvaro as Antonio "Tony" Almeda: A young man of Ilonggo descent who is a college student
- Michael de Mesa as Joey: Dimitri's lover who left him to marry his girlfriend.
- Suzanne Gonzales as Eva: An owner of an ornamental lighting store
- Odette Khan as Courutier
- Susan Valdez-LeGoff as Mercedes Almeda: Tony's mother.
- Tommy Abuel as Raul: Delza's ex-boyfriend and a divorced doctor
- Liza Lorena as Hospital Director

== Production ==
=== Filming ===
Filmmaker Danny Zialcita commenced the process with the wake scene, which is the film's last sequence. Dindo Fernando, one of the film's lead stars, was surprised by this after Zialcita asked him to bring three suits of his preference.

=== Casting ===
Gloria Diaz, who played Stella in the film, said that the filmmaker cast her because she wanted to collaborate with her due to her proficiency in speaking English.

== Reception ==
=== Critical response ===
DJ Ramones, writing for Reverse Delay, gave praise to the cast's performances, dark humor, and visual symbolism. While highlighting the film's significance as a reflection of Philippine society in the 1980s and the importance of the film's restoration efforts by ABS-CBN, he also criticized its melodramatic plot and outdated views on gender and infidelity, despite acknowledging that the story's complexity is justified or noting that it has no allotted space for visual elements.

=== Accolades ===
Award-giving organization	Date of ceremony	Category	Recipient(s)	Result	Ref.
32nd FAMAS Awards	June 16, 1984	Best Picture	Nagalit ang Buwan sa Haba ng Gabi	Nominated	
32nd FAMAS Awards	June 16, 1984	Best Director	Danny L. Zialcita	Nominated	
32nd FAMAS Awards	June 16, 1984	Best Actress	Laurice Guillen	Nominated	

== Remake ==
This movie was remade in 2013 under the title When the Love Is Gone and directed by Andoy Ranay for Viva Films. It stars Cristine Reyes playing Gloria Diaz's character, Gabby Concepcion as Dindo Fernando's character, Alice Dixson playing Laurice Guillen's role, Andi Eigenmann in Janice de Belen's previous role, and Jake Cuenca playing the role played by Eddie Garcia.

== Gallery ==
Posters
Restored movie version poster

VHS cover
