= All My Life (TV series) =

2009 Philippine television drama series

- Title card
- Genre: Romantic drama
- Created by: Aloy Adlawan
- Developed by: Keiko Aquino-Ilagan
- Directed by: Mac Alejandre; Andoy Ranay
- Starring: Aljur Abrenica; Kris Bernal
- Theme music composer: Odette Quesada
- Opening theme: "Friend of Mine" by Aiza Seguerra
- Country of origin: Philippines
- Original language: Tagalog
- No. of episodes: 60

Production
- Executive producer: Wilma Galvante
- Production locations: Metro Manila, Philippines
- Camera setup: Multiple-camera setup
- Running time: 30–45 minutes
- Production company: GMA Entertainment TV

Original release
- Network: GMA Network
- Release: June 29 – September 18, 2009

All My Life is a 2009 Philippine television drama romance series broadcast by GMA Network. Directed by Mac Alejandre and Andoy Ranay, it stars Aljur Abrenica and Kris Bernal. It premiered on June 29, 2009 on the network's Telebabad line up. The series concluded on September 18, 2009, with a total of 60 episodes.

== Cast and characters ==
Cast

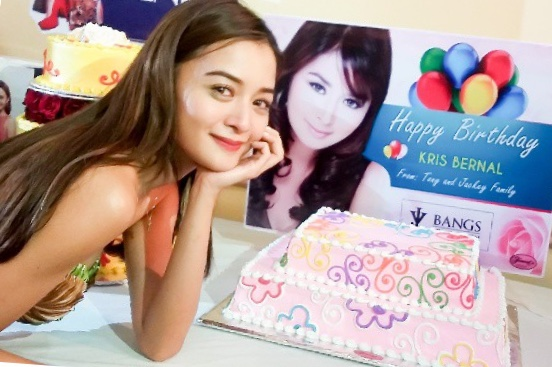
Kris Bernal

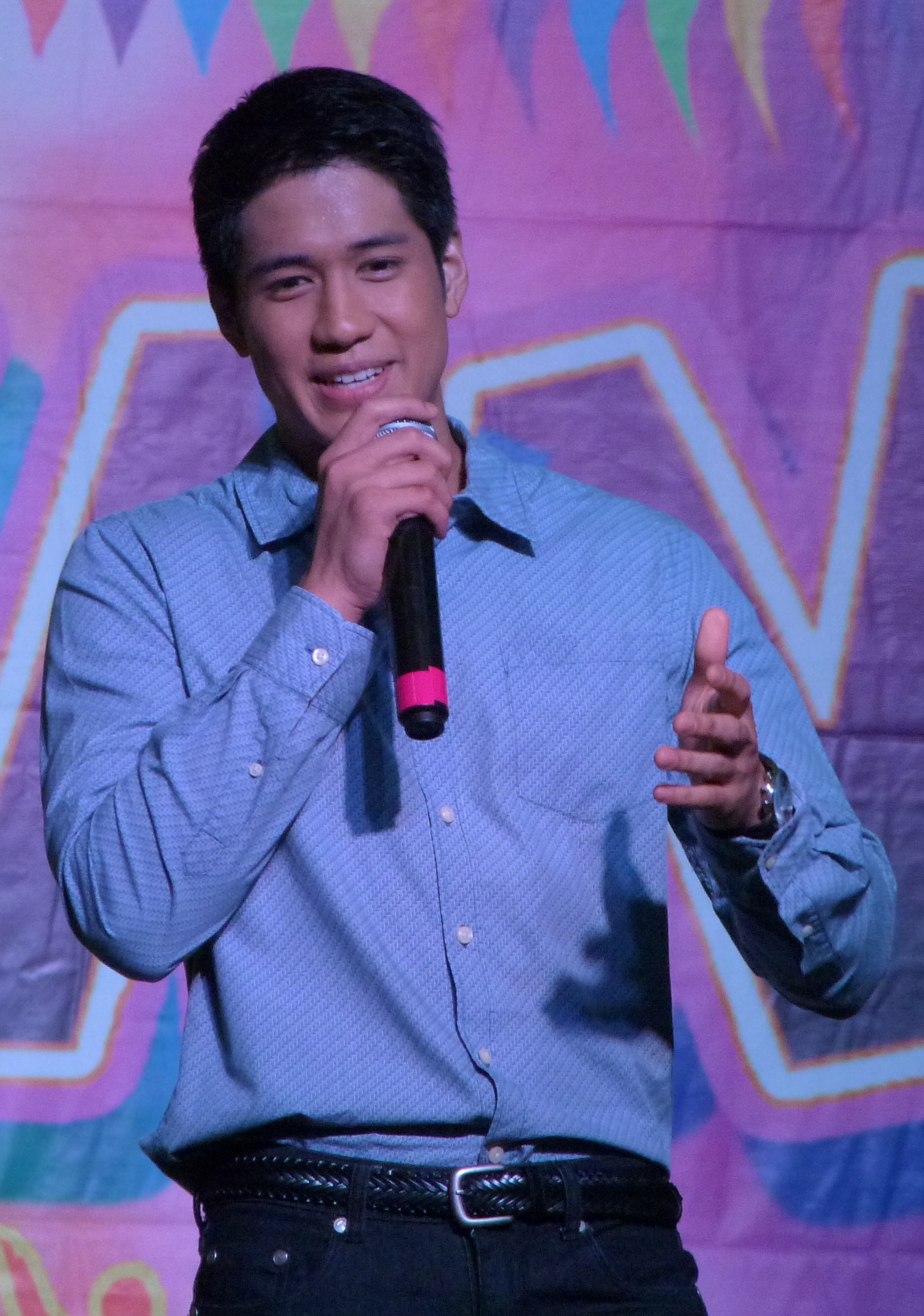
Aljur Abrenica

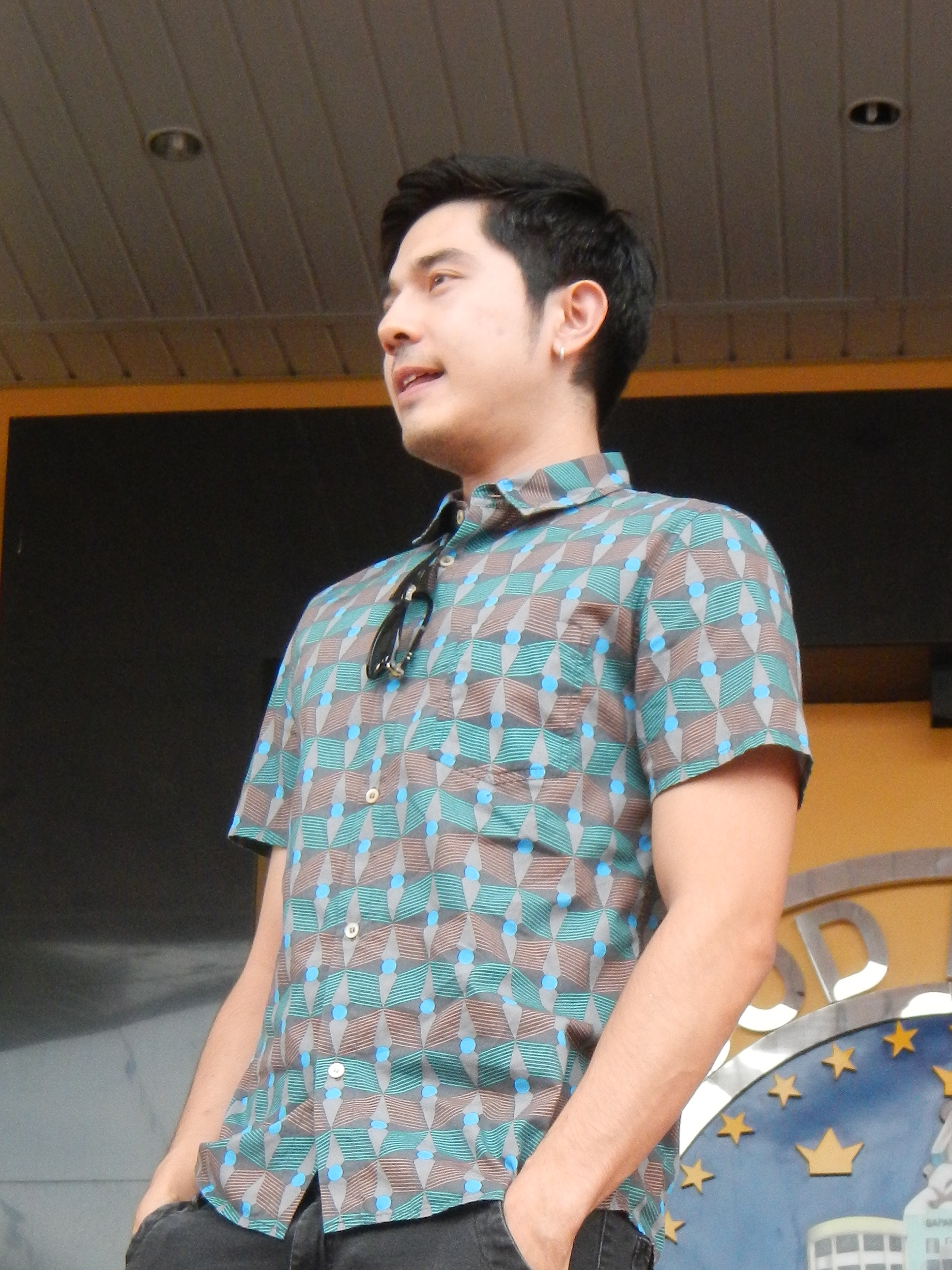
Paulo Avelino

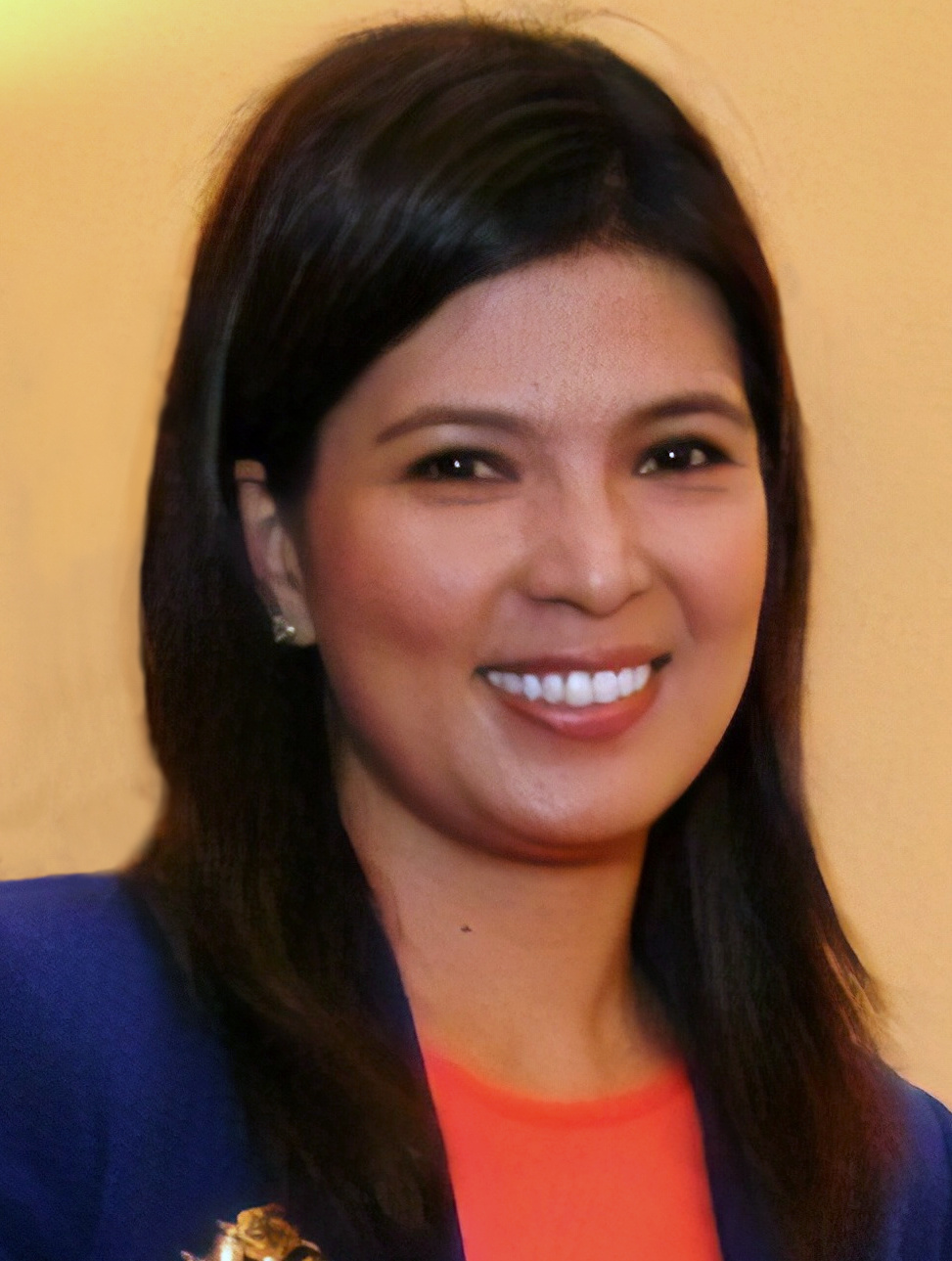
Lani Mercado

Lead cast

- Kris Bernal as Romina Estrella
- Aljur Abrenica as Jules Romualdez

Supporting cast

- Manilyn Reynes as Sally Estrella
- Gelli de Belen as Amelia Dela Paz-Estrella
- Zoren Legaspi as Romano Estrella
- Lani Mercado as Marita Castor-Romualdez
- Jay Manalo as Gary Romualdez
- Byron Ortile as Luigi Romualdez
- Martin Delos Santos as Maui Romualdez
- Stef Prescott as Nicole
- Jade Lopez as Lindsay
- Jay Aquitania as August
- Jenny Miller as Dessa
- Paulo Avelino as Perry
- LJ Reyes as Maricar
- Gladys Guevarra as Luningning
- Chris Cayzer as Joseph
- Bryan Termulo as Dino
- Moymoy Obeso as Calo
- Roadfil Obeso as Totoy

Guest cast

- Matteo Guidicelli as Matt
- Lloyd Samartino as Gilbert
- Renz Valerio as Luke Estrella
- Yasmien Kurdi as Princess

== Ratings ==
According to AGB Nielsen Philippines' Mega Manila household television ratings, the pilot episode of All My Life earned a 23.6% rating. The final episode scored a 22.7% rating.
