= T-Bird at Ako =

1982 crime drama film by Danny L. Zialcita

- Directed by: Danny Zialcita
- Written by: Portia Ilagan
- Produced by: Hirene Lopez; Ernesto C. Rojas
- Starring: Nora Aunor; Vilma Santos
- Cinematography: Felizardo Bailen
- Edited by: Enrique Jarlego Sr.
- Music by: Butch Monserrat
- Production company: Film Ventures
- Distributed by: ABS-CBN Film Productions (restored version)
- Release date: September 2, 1982
- Running time: 114 minutes
- Country: Philippines
- Language: Filipino

T-Bird at Ako (lit. 'T-Bird and Me') is a 1982 Filipino neo noir crime drama film directed by Danny Zialcita from a screenplay written by openly gay activist Portia Ilagan. Starring two of the Philippines' most prolific actresses at the time, Nora Aunor, who also recorded the song "Hiwaga Ng Pag-ibig" for the film, and Vilma Santos, the film depicts one of the earliest portrayals of LGBT themes in Philippine cinema during a time of heavier censorship and more conservative audiences. The word t-bird is a Filipino slang term for a butch lesbian.

Produced by Film Ventures, the film was theatrically released on September 2, 1982. In 2015, 33 years after the film's original release, T-Bird at Ako was digitally restored and re-mastered as one of the 75 films restored by ABS-CBN Film Archives, in collaboration with Central Digital Labs.

== Plot ==
Feisty lawyer Sylvia Salazar has made a name for herself but is still dissatisfied and uncertain, including her future with brilliant colleague Jake, who persistently asks for her hand in marriage. As she witnesses a performance by a local dancer named Sabel at a local bar, Sylvia realizes her attraction to her.

Sabel, who is a struggling burgis working several jobs, suddenly finds herself in the center of a scandal when she is harassed and threatened to be raped by the son of a rich tycoon whom she ends up killing in self-defense. Sylvia hears of this and decides to help Sabel by posting her bail, representing her in court, and providing for her, now that she is unemployed. While preparing for the case, Sylvia learns that Sabel gave birth to a son whom she gave up for adoption 7 years prior, and that the father is a married man who disappeared before learning of her pregnancy. As they continue to live in the same house, the two women begin to warm towards each other.

Later, Sabel gets a phone call from an anonymous man from her past who turns out to be Dante, the father of her child. Looking to rekindle their romance, he confesses that they lost touch because he went to prison for seven years and that his wife is now dead, and they are free to marry. Sylvia learns of Dante's return and fears it might interfere with her budding relationship with Sabel as well as her ongoing case, so she sends her assistant, Babette, to bribe Dante to disappear again. Sabel is devastated when Dante is nowhere to be found again, but she soon figures out that it was Sylvia's doing. Sylvia finally admits her attraction to Sabel, who rejects her, saying what she needs is a man, not another woman. Frustrated that she will have nothing if she runs away, Sabel finally gives in to Sylvia's desire for her "body" and tells her that after the case is won, Sylvia can do anything to her, but her heart will not be in it.

During the trial, Sylvia proves that the man who attempted to rape Sabel has a history of violence and drugs, justifying her plea for self-defense, and she is released. As Sabel walks into the hotel room where she is supposed to consummate her relationship with Sylvia, she finds Dante instead, whom Sylvia had contacted. Later, Sylvia finally accepts Jake's suggestion that she dress "like a woman," and they share a kiss.

== Cast ==
The film's supporting cast is mostly frequent collaborators of Danny Zialcita, including Suzanne Gonzales and Dindo Fernando.

- Nora Aunor as Sylvia
- Vilma Santos as Sabel
- Dindo Fernando as Dante
- Tommy Abuel as Jake
- Suzanne Gonzales as Babette
- Odette Khan as Maxie
- Dick Israel as Dickie
- Leila Hermosa as Rubia
- Johnny Wilson as Prosecutor
- Rosemarie Gil as Mrs. Alba
- Subas Herrero as Mr. Alba
- Liza Lorena as Foster Mother
- Alvin Enriquez as Tony
- Angie Salinas as Yaya
- Tony Carreon as Judge

== Critical reception ==
Isagani R. Cruz, in his review of the film for Parade (dated September 22, 1982), wrote:

The direction is tight and masterful. Although one always gets reminded in a Zialcita film of sequences from foreign films, there is a minimum of unmotivated blocking in this film. Each sequence contributes to the whole film (if there is copying, in other words, and I do think there is in this film, the copying is not done simply to be cute or clever, but in accordance with the logical requirements of the plot).
