= Bituing Walang Ningning =

2006 Philippine television drama

- Title card
- Genre: Drama; Musical; Romance
- Created by: ABS-CBN Studios
- Based on: Bituing Walang Ningning (1985) by Emmanuel H. Borlaza
- Directed by: Gilbert G. Perez; Erick Salud; Jerome Chavez Pobocan
- Starring: Sarah Geronimo; Angelika Dela Cruz; Zsa Zsa Padilla; Amy Austria; Tonton Gutierrez; Ryan Agoncillo; John Prats; Carlo Aquino; Ai-Ai delas Alas
- Opening theme: "Bituing Walang Ningning" by Sarah Geronimo
- Composer: Willy Cruz
- Country of origin: Philippines
- Original language: Tagalog
- No. of episodes: 104

Production
- Executive producers: Roldeo T. Endrinal; Emerald Suarez; Kylie Manalo-Balagtas
- Production locations: Manila; Cebu
- Running time: 25–30 minutes
- Production companies: Dreamscape Entertainment; Viva Television

Original release
- Network: ABS-CBN
- Release: May 15 – October 6, 2006

Bituing Walang Ningning (transl. star without a sparkle /International Name: Shining Star) is a 2006 Philippine television drama musical romance series broadcast by ABS-CBN. Directed by Gilbert G. Perez, Erick Salud and Jerome Chavez Pobocan, it stars Sarah Geronimo, Angelika Dela Cruz, Zsa Zsa Padilla, Amy Austria, Tonton Gutierrez, Ryan Agoncillo, John Prats, Carlo Aquino and Ai-Ai delas Alas. It aired on the network's Primetime Bida line up from May 15 to October 6, 2006, replacing Gulong ng Palad and was replaced by Maging Sino Ka Man.

The series was supposed to end on September 22, 2006, but ended on October 6, 2006, due to coverage of the special concert staged at the Smart Araneta Coliseum and a taped interview for the series on September 12 and also rehearsals, taping and dubbing which occurred during the run. The finale was in five parts for its finale week, introduced its current prime time series Maging Sino Ka Man with its pilot episode moved to a different timeslot and would also be the replacement of the TV series. On October 1, 2006, a "Himig of Pasasalamat Concert" was staged at the Araneta with all of the characters which was also televised live. The series also showed a glimpse of behind-the-scenes footage and also sung the themes from its successful album produced by Star Records and Viva Records. Although, it was said that some parts of the series were supposed to also be produced by Viva such as songs sung by Sarah Geronimo herself and the theme of the song was originally popularized by Sharon Cuneta in the film. This was Carlo Aquino's final show on ABS-CBN before moving to its rival network GMA 7 in November whereas Hero Angeles who also moved to the same network when he controversially ended his Star Magic contract in 2005 and Errol Abalayan who did not continue his own acting (both former SCQ teen questors), although they both did not join the ensemble cast.

Production started in January through mid September airing the next following week of the concert airing on Sundays best two taped interviews were taped separately before Sarah and Angelika would go on doing different soaps in 2007 Sarah Geronimo did a follow-up soap with a similar storyline Pangarap na Bituin the soap was taped weekly until Geronimo turned 18 years old in August due to labor laws during filming in August her debut was also taped during the series and Dela Cruz opened up that in the past her manager Boy Abunda asked her to do this soap which became a game changer as Dela Cruz was known for playing sassy heroines in Soap or TV projects as her image was as of Maricel Soriano.

The series was streaming online on YouTube.

== Origin ==
The story started as a serialised comic strip by Nerissa Cabral. It was adapted into a movie in 1985 with the same title by Viva Films, directed by Emmanuel H. Borlaza and starred Sharon Cuneta as Dorina Pineda, Cherie Gil as Lavinia Arguelles, and Christopher de Leon as Nico Escobar. It was produced by Vic del Rosario Jr. of VIVA Entertainment. The film became an instant hit, quickly developing a cult following and produced the popular line "You're nothing but a second-rate, trying hard copycat!", uttered in the film by Lavinia.

== Television series ==
In 2006, ABS-CBN bought the rights from Nerissa Cabral to turn the film into a TV series. She agreed to do the remake with the conditions of Sarah Geronimo portraying the role of Dorina Pineda and that the story would stay true to the fan-star relationship depicted in the original story. Angelika Dela Cruz later was tapped as Lavina Arguelles. Promotional shoots began in early January while taping started from early January to April then throughout. On the Sunday show ASAP the two had to play their characters from the soap to link for the then-upcoming episodes. Some changes to the story from the original script such as Rosa Mia being played by Zsa-Zsa Padilla, Emilio played by Tonton Gutierrez, and Adora played by Ai-Ai Delas Alas in her first prime time drama series. It additionally starred Amy Austria as Barbara Arguelles, Carla Humphries as Rita Arguelles, and then Tuesday Vargas' Libby character in her more serious debut. Apart from being a comedian her character counterpart on the show had more admiration for Dorina and played Larry Calma's assistant.

== Synopsis ==
Emilio and Rosa Mia are a loving couple expecting their first child. Rosa Mia is a devout, aspiring singer, who sings at a small nightclub to earn a living while Emilio is a security guard in the same club where Rosa Mia works. When the club's owner learns of their relationship and Rosa Mia's pregnancy, he fires them from the club leaving them jobless and destitute yet optimistic.

One night, as Emilio was out seeking employment, Rosa Mia goes into labour. With no one around, she runs outside and into the pouring rain to get to the hospital. Fortunately, Emilio arrives and sees Rosa Mia struggling, but Rosa Mia already gives birth in the street to a baby girl they name Emilia Rose.

Emilia Rose becomes a sickly child, developing lung problems which brings her in and out of the hospital. Rising medical bills force a desperate Rosa Mia to accept a month-long singing engagement in Cebu, leaving Emilio to care for the baby on his own. He brings Emilia Rose with him out on his new job as a security guard in another club. On one occasion, Emilio's boss has him deliver a package to a different club, so he leaves the baby with his acquaintance Adora, a rose seller in the red-light district of Malate. Adora agrees to mind the baby for a few minutes, waiting outside the club for Emilio's return. Unbeknownst to Adora, Emilio is arrested inside the club because the package turns out to filled with drugs. Adora waits all night for Emilio, who never returns, and brings the baby home with her.

The loss of Emilia Rose and Emilio's imprisonment lead to bitterness and estrangement between Emilio and Rosa Mia. Adora has meanwhile grown to love the baby and decides to raise her as her own, calling her Adorina, or "Dorina" for short. Meanwhile, with the loss of her child, Rosa Mia throws herself into her music and is discovered by Lauro Calma, a record producer. He develops Rosa Mia into a star, asking her not to reveal that she is married and a mother. Rosa Mia agrees, and soon rises to fame as the "Sensational Diva". Dorina meanwhile grows up to be happy with Adora, and both become avid fans of Rosa Mia.

Meanwhile, Lavinia, an up-and-coming singer, emerges on the scene. Her ambitious mother, Barbara, tells Lavinia to befriend Rosa Mia to boost her popularity. Lonely and vulnerable, Rosa Mia takes Lavinia under her wing, seeking a replacement for her lost daughter. With Rosa Mia's help, Lavinia also becomes very popular, which is not enough for Barbara, who wants Lavinia to be on top. Barbara connives with Larry Calma, the son of Rosa Mia's manager, Lauro.

Larry wants to prove himself to his father so he handles Lavinia and connives with Barbara to knock off Rosa Mia from the top spot, leaving Lavinia as the ultimate and most popular singer. Through intrigue and character assassination, they succeed in causing Rosa Mia to fall from grace, bereft of her reputation and popularity. Rosa Mia decides to leave the show business and returns to singing in small nightclubs.

Soon, Dorina begins to idolize Lavinia. She attends her concerts to catch a glimpse of her idol and offer her sampaguita. But Dorina also loves to sing. With the help of Adora and her best friend Oman, Dorina joins singing contests. Eventually, she wins a singing competition on television. She gains the attention of everyone, including Nico Escobar, the boyfriend of Lavinia.

Nico is in love with Lavinia, but it becomes clear that Lavinia is too involved in her career. She refuses to marry him, fearing that doing so would damage her popularity. Bitter and angry, Nico wants to show Lavinia that her career should not be top priority in her life, so he plans to develop another singer as Lavinia's rival to supplant her. Nico uses Dorina to accomplish this, and with his friend Zossimo, sets up Zoni Records to develop Dorina's singing career. Dorina soon finds herself admiring Nico and developing feelings for him, but she does not know how Nico feels about her. Dorina's interest in Nico comes as a blow to her best friend Oman and her bandmate Gary, both of whom are in love with Dorina.

Dorina gains fame, causing Lavinia to see her as a threat. After a big event, Lavinia becomes so enraged by Dorina's great performance and attention of all that she attacks Dorina and calls her a copycat, prompting the latter to fight back. Nico and Zossimo find a song once composed by Rosa Mia before she left the music scene. They buy the rights to the song from Rosa Mia and ask her to help Dorina with her singing. At first, Rosa Mia refuses after what happened with Lavinia, but she eventually relents and agrees to help her out. They soon become close, not knowing of their real relationship.

Not long after, Emilio is released from prison, and he sets out to find Adora and his daughter. He later succeeds, only to learn that his daughter is now Dorina, the singer he had been admiring while still in jail. Emilio decides not to tell Dorina of their true relationship for fear of ruining her career, but to be close to his daughter, he takes on a job as her chauffeur and bodyguard.

Dorina eventually knows her real parents, and at the last concert, her emotions flow to the last song. Rosa Mia and Emilio are reunited; Adora, who gets diagnosed with cancer, passes away; Nico forgives Lavinia; and Oman, who finishes his studies, becomes a couple with Dorina.

== Cast and characters ==
The following table summarizes the main cast.

Character	Actor/Actress	Character Description
Dorina Pineda / Emilia Rose Suarez	Sarah Geronimo	18 years old. Hardworking and grateful for her blessings despite her poverty, she is a dutiful child and loving sister. A devotee of Our Lady of Perpetual Help, she was a sampaguita vendor outside Baclaran Church, the icon's shrine. An exceptional singer, and a frequent participant in singing contests. Patient, not easily angered unless provoked. Love is far from her mind, as her singing, her family, and God are more important.
Lavinia Arguelles	Angelika Dela Cruz	24 years old. From childhood, she has been forced by her mother to work. Her mother dreams of turning her daughter into a star. Briefly became Rosa Mia's protégé, but in the end, she turned on her mentor and contributed directly to Rosa Mia's downfall. Due to her mother's brainwashing, her life and her happiness revolved around the bright lights and the applause of her fans. She would do anything, step on anyone just to reach her dreams. Being an artist is all she knows. She would turn her back on her own family to hold onto her career.
Rosa Mia Suarez	Zsa Zsa Padilla	35 years old. Dorina's mother. A singer. Separated from Dorina while her daughter was still a baby. She loves her lost daughter, but does not know how to begin looking for her. Hardworking. Became a famous singer, but her career did not last. Eventually reduced to singing in small bars to make a living, until through a twist of fate, she crosses paths with Dorina, without realizing that she has met her daughter. Became Dorina's mentor.
Emilio Suarez	Tonton Gutierrez	38 years old. Dorina's father. Security guard. Loves his wife Rosa Mia, but felt some jealousy because his wife's career picked up faster than his. He is responsible for the loss of baby Emilia Rose. Falsely accused of being a drug pusher, he served time in prison. Upon his release, he searched for and found his long-lost daughter. But Dorina was already famous; he did not want his past to ruin his child's future. He chose to keep quiet about his identity; instead, he applied to be Dorina's driver and bodyguard. Loyal and protective. His only wish is for his daughter to have a good life.
Adora Pineda	Ai-Ai delas Alas	41 years old. Does not have a child of her own. Had to undergo a hysterectomy as a result of a miscarriage. Was abandoned by her husband. She found baby Emilia Rose and raised her as her own child. Dorina knows she is adopted, but she does not yearn for her parents because Adora loves her dearly. Adora earns a meager living as a vendor in a food stand. She gives her all to her two daughters.
Barbara Arguelles	Amy Austria	44 years old. A former maid of an expatriate American with whom she eventually had children. Stage mother. Has two beautiful and talented daughters. When her husband died, she was left with nothing because her husband turned out to have another family in the US. She brainwashed her children, and forced Lavinia to work. She does not realize that she is creating her own worst nightmare, because before long, Lavinia would turn on her.
Bencho Pineda	Mica Roi Torre	6 years old. Adora's niece. Her mother died of cancer, so Adora had raised Bencho as her own child. Dorina loves her dearly, which is why Dorina and Adora try to spoil her as much as they can. Cute, persistent, and nosy. Always ready to start a fight with Adora's or Dorina's detractors. An avid fan of Dorina/Oman romance, she consistently tells Oman to declare his feelings.
Rita Arguelles	Carla Humphries	18 years old. Lavinia's sister. Dorina's friend. Guitar player. She befriends Dorina and lets her know that in her mother's eyes, she is forever in her sister's shadow. Fights Barbara when her mother's ambitious nature led her to acts of treachery. Her own musical aspirations inadvertently led to a confrontation with her own sister. She was brutally punished by Barbara after she dragged her home from backstage at the end of the concert with Halo, Dorina's band and her left hand remained injured that her mother pushed with the piano fall board, got grounded in her room and Lavinia confronted her because they call her traitor as they are not forgiven each other. In the end, Rita was reconciled by her mother by asking forgiveness.
Nico Escobar	Ryan Agoncillo	27 years old. Rich. A gentleman. A good man. Decided to strike out on his own rather than join his father's business because he wants to help Lavinia with her career. But when Lavinia turned down his marriage proposal, he decided to support Dorina and pit her against Lavinia. He does not realize when Dorina grows to have feelings for him.
Gary	John Prats	22 years old. A good man, but aggressive. Frank. "Live by the day" is his motto. He does not plan too far ahead. A free spirit. Backup singer and arranger of Dorina's band. He eventually falls in love with Dorina. He is prepared to wait until Dorina returns his feelings.
Norman "Oman" Fidel Gonzales	Carlo Aquino	20 years old. Grew up with Dorina and is her best friend. Shy. Has common tastes. Did not finish school, but became Dorina's inspiration in her quest to better her own life. Decided to resume his studies for Dorina, because he loves her and wants to prove himself worthy of her. But no matter what he does, he feels he cannot keep up with Dorina's success. "Gave up" on Dorina and had developed feelings for a classmate, Kylie, but are his feelings for real? Or just a defense mechanism to hide his hurt for his unreciprocated feelings for Dorina?
Zossimo	Miko Palanca	28 years old. Rich. A businessman. A good musician. Nico's best friend. Also became Nico's business partner when they set up a recording company to promote Dorina.
Larry Calma	Dominic Ochoa	30 years old. Producer of Lavinia's recording company. Shrewd. Would do anything for Lavinia, because unbeknownst to her, Larry is in love with her. Even when Lavinia is no longer popular, he continued to build up her career.
Libby	Tuesday Vargas	Larry's executive assistant. Would carry out Lavinia and Larry's orders but always with hesitation. Has frequently shown (albeit, subtly) admiration for Dorina and her plight.
Jay	Jay Perillo	Guitarist. Former member of Halo, Dorina's band. Bad-tempered and would do anything for fame and money. Betrayed Dorina and the band when he and Chris unwittingly became Larry's spies after he offered them a "better" contract under LaCalma Records.
Chris	Chris Cayzer	Guitarist. Former member of Halo, Dorina's band. Level-headed, but can be blinded by money. When infighting surfaces in the band, he is quick to defend Jay. Betrayed Dorina and the band when he and Jay unwittingly became Larry's spies after he offered them a "better" contract under LaCalma Records.
Jack	Janus del Prado	Keyboardist (and sometimes guitarist). A member of Halo, Dorina's band. Rita's boyfriend. As the level-headed one of the group, he is often mediating between infighting in the band that pitted Gary against Jay and Chris.
Minda	Jennifer Illustre	Adora's best friend.
Oscar Clemente	Benjie Felipe	The reporter that was used by Lavinia to bring Rosa Mia and Dorina down from their spot and make them unpopular. Oscar would say bad things in his newspaper column about Dorina and Rosa Mia for money.
Kylie	Brenda Fox	A very close friend of Oman's and Dorina's. Oman met her in school. Dorina thought that Kylie is Oman's girlfriend.
Andrei	Charles Christianson	Ex-boyfriend of Kylie and is very jealous of Oman because he thought that Oman is Kylie's boyfriend.

=== Differences in the television series ===
A number of plot and character differences were introduced in the TV version, in part to extend the limited storyline of the movie:

- Dorina's birth parents (biological father and mother and also has an adoptive mother and younger sister) are new additions to the story.
- Lavinia's family (mother, sister) are also new additions.
- The TV version attempts to provide an explanation for Lavinia's evil ways; no explanation was provided in the movie.
- While the TV version stayed faithful to the fact that Nico made Dorina a star, it also shows that her career was helped by her joining a competition Search for the Star in a Million.
- The character of Oman is also a new addition.
- The TV version has three love triangles (Dorina-Oman-Gary, Lavinia-Nico-Larry and Dorina-Nico-Lavinia). In the movie version, the primary love triangles were between Dorina-Nico-Lavinia and Gary-Dorina-Nico.
- The TV version is on a Compact Disc (CD); instead the Laser Disc (or Records) for the movie version.
- The TV version staged a Grand Showdown, dubbed as "The Clash of the Divas", between Dorina and Lavinia (very much like the one also featuring the final showdown between Dorina and Lavinia). The Grand Showdown scenes were taped in front of a live audience of more than 15,000 viewers on September 19, 2006, at the Araneta Coliseum. Selected scenes from the Grand Showdown were used in the show's final episodes.
- The September 24, 2006 episode of The Buzz interviewed Sarah Geronimo and Angelika Dela Cruz in their characters on the TV series as part of the show's promotion. The Buzz made it appear as if Boy Abunda is interviewing Dorina, and Kris Aquino is interviewing Lavinia, in real-time. Sarah Geronimo had a taped interview with Boy Abunda in the role of Dorina, while Angelika Dela Cruz, in the character of Lavinia, reacted to Dorina's interview in a live interview with Kris Aquino. The interview was also aired the next day in the fifth to the last episode of the series.
- In the film, Dorina has an aunt while in the TV series she has an adoptive mother. Dorina's aunt in the film lives, while Dorina's adoptive mother in the series passes away.

=== Trivia about the TV series ===
- Actress Angelika Dela Cruz was originally hesitant to accept the role of Lavinia, fearing that she would be typecasted in antagonist roles. She eventually decided to accept the role because (among other reasons) it gave her a chance to resume her singing career, which had been on hold for several years due to legal problems with her previous recording label.
- Two rival entertainment reporters on the TV series (Oscar and Edith) are portrayed by real-life husband and wife Benjie Felipe and Lisa Andaya.
- The Grand Showdown that was taped at the Araneta Coliseum also held a post-finale concert, featuring several ABS-CBN artists, with Aga Muhlach as the most important guest. The concert was majorly sponsored by Jollibee and was aired on ABS-CBN on October 15, 2006.
- In the then-recently concluded ASAP Pop Viewers' Choice Awards 2006, this series won Pop TV Show of the Year, Pop TV Theme Song and Pop TV Character (Dorina Pineda).
- Bituing Walang Ningning was one of the "Most Well-Liked TV Program" winners of the Year in the Anak TV Seal Awards 2006.
- It is the third "Sineserye" to be made.
- The series re-aired on the Kapamilya Channel on Direct TV in September 2008.
- No DVD release has been scheduled for the series.
- The teleserye was supposed to approximately run till September but it was extended due to the concert and due to its high ratings.

=== Soundtrack ===
Bituing Walang Ningning

Soundtrack album by Various artists
- Released: May 2006
- Labels: Viva Records, Star Music

The Bituing Walang Ningning soundtrack is jointly produced by Viva Records and Star Music. The soundtrack was released in May 2006, before the series began airing and features performances by cast members. The album reached gold status, selling more than 15,000 copies nationwide.

The tracks in the original soundtrack are:

1. "Bituing Walang Ningning" – Sarah Geronimo
2. "Sana'y Maghintay ang Walang Hanggan" – Zsa Zsa Padilla
3. "Nasaan Ka Man" – Zsa Zsa Padilla and Sarah Geronimo
4. "Miss na Miss Kita" – Angelika dela Cruz
5. "Dito Ba" – Sarah Geronimo and Angelika dela Cruz
6. "Hold On" – Chris Cayzer
7. "Kanta Tayo" – Ai-Ai de las Alas
8. "Bakit Ba Ganyan" – Carlo Aquino
9. "Missing You" – Jay Perillo
10. "Bituing Walang Ningning" (Radio Edit)

The soundtrack was repackaged in July 2006 and re-released with two additional tracks, "Felt So Right" and "Million Miles Away" by Sarah Geronimo.

== Reception ==
=== Ratings ===
Bituing Walang Ningning garnered 29.2% (Mega Manila) for its pilot episode against its rival show Extra Challenge, which garnered 32% on the same day. The show continued to plunge down and soar up from the low to high 20s, and was pitted against many telefantasyas, such as Captain Barbell after Extra Challenge ended. Although it was ABS-CBN's highest rated show for almost all of its run in Mega Manila Area, it was constantly beaten by programs on the GMA Network. However, for its final episode, Bituing Walang Ningning shot up to 34.8% making it a staggering success against its GMA 7 counterpart Majika which got 26% allowing the TV series to be no.1 for its final episode, challenging GMA Network's dominance in Mega Manila Area. In the nationwide ratings, released by AGB Nielsen Phils., Bituing Walang Ningning became the 2nd highest rated TV show for the year 2006, garnering a whopping 45.1%, with the daily ratings of 40% and above.

In Mega Manila, its highest rating is 35.6%, the lowest was 25.3% with an average of 29.7%. While in Nationwide ratings, its highest rating was 48.3% while the lowest was 36.4%, and the average of 42.5%.

=== Weekly ratings (Mega Manila) ===
Week	Dates	Average	Peak
01	May 15–19, 2006	27.9%	29.2%
02	May 22–26, 2006	26.4%	28.3%
03	May 29 – June 2, 2006	24.6%	25.8%
04	June 5–9, 2006	26.4%	27.0%
05	June 12–16, 2006	28.6%	31.7%
06	June 19–23, 2006	28.9%	30.3%
07	June 26–30, 2006	29.7%	30.4%
08	July 3–7, 2006	28.9%	30.2%
09	July 10–14, 2006	30.8%	31.7%
10	July 17–21, 2006	31.4%	33.0%
11	July 24–28, 2006	31.7%	33.2%
12	July 31 – August 4, 2006	31.5%	32.4%
13	August 7–11, 2006	32.1%	35.6%
14	August 14–18, 2006	32.7%	33.6%
15	August 21–25, 2006	33.2%	35.5%
16	August 28 – September 1, 2006	29.7%	31.2%
17	September 4–8, 2006	29.2%	30.2%
18	September 11–15, 2006	28.9%	30.9%
19	September 18–22, 2006	28.1%	32.1%
20	September 25–29, 2006	28.7%	29.1%

Source: AGBNMR Philippines

=== Accolades ===
Award	Category	Recipient	Result
21st PMPC Star Awards for Television	Best Drama Actress	Angelika dela Cruz	Nominated
21st PMPC Star Awards for Television	Best Drama Actress	Ai-Ai de las Alas	Nominated
21st PMPC Star Awards for Television	Best Primetime Drama Series	Bituing Walang Ningning	Nominated
ASAP Pop Viewers' Choice Awards 2006	Pop TV Show of the Year	Bituing Walang Ningning	Won
ASAP Pop Viewers' Choice Awards 2006	Pop TV Character	Dorina (Sarah Geronimo)	Won
ASAP Pop Viewers' Choice Awards 2006	Pop TV Theme Song	Bituing Walang Ningning	Won
Anak TV Seal Awards 2006	Most Well-Liked TV Program	Bituing Walang Ningning	Won
