= Madam Chairman =

2013–14 Philippine television comedy drama series

- Title card
- Genre: Comedy drama
- Developed by: Elmer L. Gatchalian
- Written by: Charlotte Dianco; Myxkaella Villalon
- Directed by: Joel Lamangan
- Starring: Sharon Cuneta; Jay Manalo; Byron Ortile
- Theme music composer: Emerzon Texon
- Opening theme: "Kahit Konti" by Gary Granada
- Country of origin: Philippines
- Original language: Tagalog
- No. of episodes: 100

Production
- Executive producer: Maricel Ticar-Santos
- Production locations: Metro Manila, Philippines
- Cinematography: Arnie Alvaro
- Running time: 30 minutes
- Production company: TV5 Entertainment Group

Original release
- Network: TV5
- Release: October 14, 2013 – February 28, 2014

Madam Chairman is a Philippine television comedy series broadcast by TV5. Directed by Joel Lamangan, it stars Sharon Cuneta, Jay Manalo and Byron Ortile. It aired on the network's evening line up from October 14, 2013 to February 28, 2014, replacing Sine Ko 5ingko was replaced by Confessions of a Torpe.

It is credited as Cuneta's first ever teleserye. It revolves around a Barangay chairwoman and her struggles in dividing her role as a mother and as a public official.

== Cast and characters ==
Main cast

- Sharon Cuneta as Elizabeth "Bebeth" de Guzman
- Jay Manalo as Armando "Dodong" de Guzman
- Akihiro Blanco as Antonello "Bubuy" de Guzman
- Shaira Diaz as Katherine "Kakay" de Guzman
- Byron Ortile as Armando "Junjun" de Guzman Jr.
- Regine Angeles as Beverly Pagaspas
- Bayani Agbayani as Jojo Camponanes

Supporting cast

- Glenda Kennedy as Mercy
- Nanette Inventor as Salud
- Tony Mabesa as Father Andy
- Jim Pebangco as Mayor Sid Magbutay
- Lou Veloso as Vice Mayor Fortunato Gigil
- Lovely Abella as Mayor Sid's Secretary
- Bearwin Meily as Ben Boljak
- Manny Castañeda as Hermes
- Fanny Serrano as Moises
- Malou de Guzman as Cita
- Gilleth Sandico
- Toby Alejar
- Patani
- Malak So Shdifat
- Claire Ruiz
- Adrian Sebastian
- Chris Cuneta
- Mavi Lozano
- Clint Gabo

=== Special guest ===
- Richard Gomez
- Bing Loyzaga
- Epi Quizon
- Giselle Sanchez
- Ara Mina
- Joseph Bitangcol
- IC Mendoza
- April Gustilo
- Chanel Morales
- Paolo Paraiso
- Caloy Alde
- Cita Astals
- Ana Feleo
- Prince Estefan
- Nicole Estrada
- RS Francisco
- Kevin Balot
- Divine Lee
- Mae Paner (A.K.A. Juana Change)
- G. Toengi

== See also ==
- List of TV5 (Philippine TV network) original programming
