= Chris Cayzer =

Filipino musician

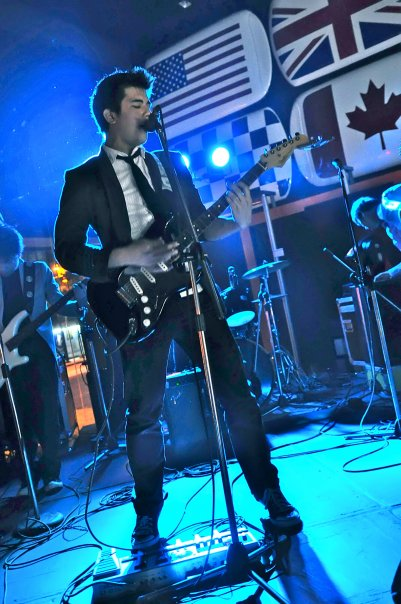

Background information
- Born: Christopher Ashley Luke Cayzer (Note: Chris Cayzer was born in Australia. Thus, he does not possess his mother's maiden name which is Araneta.); 29 December 1986 (age 39)
- Origin: Brisbane, Australia
- Occupations: Singer, VJ, actor
- Instruments: Guitar, vocals
- Years active: 2006–present
- Labels: Warner Music (2009); NuGen Music (2006–2008); Star Magic (2006–2008)
- Website: web.archive.org/web/20120901215042/http://www.chriscayzer.com.au/

Christopher Ashley Luke Cayzer (born 29 December 1986) is a Filipino-Australian singer, actor, DJ and VJ. He was a Top 6 finalist in the Over 25 Category on The X Factor Australia in 2012.

== Biography ==
=== Family background ===
Cayzer was born on 29 December 1986 in Brisbane, Australia to Filipino parents Khristine Araneta and Alexander Cayzer. His mother is from Zamboanga and his father from Manila. He has an older sister, Patricia.

=== Early life ===
During his youth in Australia, Cayzer worked two jobs. He was a clerk at K-Mart, and at the same time held down a job as a post master in Australia's post office. These two jobs prompted him to take a vacation in the Philippines.

He travelled with his father to the country, both to relax and help out in their family business. While in the Philippines, he got an unexpected break in local show business, both as an actor and recording artist.

After graduating from high school, Cayzer left Australia to continue his tertiary education in the Philippines, as well as pursue his musical career.

=== Career ===
In 2006, Star Records decided to create sub-label NuGen Music, which aimed to produce more sophisticated pop music. Cayzer became the first artist record under NuGen Music, releasing his debut album that same year. The first single was I Got You, which according to Cayzer is based on personal experience. He also released a remake of Lisa Loeb’s Stay. Star Records also had him contribute a remake of Neocolours’ Hold On for the Bituing Walang Ningning OST.

In 2007, Cayzer became a host for Myx TV, ABS-CBN Global's cable network for Asian Americans in the United States. He hosted numerous shows, including MYX P.I. and OMG before leaving the network in 2008 to pursue other opportunities, including joining Sunday variety show SOP on GMA Network.

In 2009, Cayzer was cast for prime time series on GMA Network called All My Life, co-starring with Kris Bernal and LJ Reyes. Cayzer's second solo album You're the Only Thing was released under Warner Music Philippines on 29 August 2009. The first single from the album was a self-composed Tagalog song called Loko.

In 2010, Cayzer moved to the TV5 network. He eventually left Philippine showbiz the following year and moved back to his native Australia.

In August 2012, Cayzer appeared in the fourth season of Channel Seven's The X Factor Australia and made it to the Top 24.

=== Musical influences ===
Cayzer names John Mayer and his Room for Squares album as his major musical influence. His other musical influences include Rob Thomas of Matchbox 20, James Taylor and Kenny Rankin. Cayzer's father Reggie was a big fan of jazz artists like George Benson, Lee Ritenour and Kenny Rankin, who also influenced Cayzer's music.

== Filmography ==
=== Television ===
Year	Film	Role	Notes
2006	Bituing Walang Ningning	Chris	
2007	ASAP	Himself	Performer
2007–2008	MYX P.I.	Himself	Host
2008–2010	SOP	Himself	Performer
2009	Maynila	Jon	Guest, 1 episode
2009	Dear Friend: Bakasyonistas	Troy	
2009	All My Life	Joseph	
2010	BFGF	Wency	
2010	P.O.5	Himself	Host/performer
2012	X Factor Australia	Himself	

=== Film ===
Year	Film	Role
2006	Close to You	Bandmate
2010	White House	Mikey's boyfriend

== Discography ==
Year	Album	Label
2006	Chris Cayzer	Nugen Music
2006	Bituing Walang Ningning (OST) (on the track "Hold On")	Viva Records/Star Records
2007	Pinoy Biggie Hits	Star Records
2008	Kitty Girls (on the track "Never Ever")	Star Records
2009	You're the Only Thing	Warner Music Philippines
2012	Not Auto-Tuned	Independent

== Music videos ==
Year	Song	Album	Director
2006	"I Got You"	Chris Cayzer	Ramon del Prado
2007	"Stay"	Chris Cayzer	Paul Soriano
2011	"Drive"	Chris Cayzer	Treb Monteras

== Awards and citations ==
Year	Organization	Award
2007	Awit Awards	People's Choice Favorite New Male Artist
2010	Star Music Awards	Male Acoustic Artist of the Year
