= Gaano Kadalas ang Minsan (TV series) =

2008 Philippine television drama series

- Title card
- Also known as: Love Me Again
- Genre: Romantic drama
- Based on: Gaano Kadalas ang Minsan? (1982) by Danny L. Zialcita
- Developed by: Don Michael Perez
- Directed by: Gil Tejada Jr.
- Starring: Marvin Agustin; Camille Prats; Diana Zubiri
- Opening theme: "Gaano Kadalas ang Minsan?" by La Diva
- Country of origin: Philippines
- Original language: Tagalog
- No. of episodes: 100

Production
- Executive producer: Camille Gomba-Montaño
- Production locations: Metro Manila, Philippines
- Camera setup: Multiple-camera setup
- Running time: 25–35 minutes
- Production company: GMA Entertainment TV

Original release
- Network: GMA Network
- Release: June 23 – November 7, 2008

Gaano Kadalas ang Minsan (transl. how often is sometimes / international title: Love Me Again) is a 2008 Philippine television drama romance series broadcast by GMA Network. Based on a 1982 Philippine film of the same title, the series is the ninth instalment of Sine Novela. Directed by Gil Tejada Jr., it stars Marvin Agustin, Camille Prats and Diana Zubiri. It premiered on June 23, 2008 on the network's Dramarama sa Hapon line up. The series concluded on November 7, 2008, with a total of 100 episodes.

== Cast and characters ==
Lead cast

- Marvin Agustin as Louis Antonio "Louie" Almeda
- Camille Prats as Lily Medrano/Cervantes
- Diana Zubiri as Elsa Cervantes-Almeda

Supporting cast

- Sandy Andolong as Gloria Cervantes
- Maybelyn dela Cruz as Charley Villanueva-Paterno
- Biboy Ramirez as Eric Paterno
- Victor Aliwalas as Thomas "Tommy" Romero
- Andrea del Rosario as Margarita Mendoza

Guest cast

- Ronnie Lazaro as Anselmo Perdigon
- Mark Gil as Emilio Cervantes
- Paulo Avelino as Kiko
- Ces Quesada as Pilar Medrano
- Julie Anne San Jose as Claudette Medrano
- Jesi Corcuera as Raquel "Rocky" Perdigon
- Mon Confiado as Fredo
- Jana Roxas as Kathleen
- Jan Marini as Barbara
- Sweet Ramos as Dea Paterno
- Byron Ortile as Alvin
- Patricia Ysmael as Nina
- Dino Guevarra as Dodong
- Jen Rosendahl as Anya
- Krystal Reyes as Lara

== Casting ==
Actress Sunshine Dizon was initially hired to play the character Lily Medrano. Actress Camille Prats later served as her replacement.

== Ratings ==
According to AGB Nielsen Philippines' Mega Manila household television ratings, the pilot episode of Gaano Kadalas ang Minsan earned a 19.8% rating. The final episode scored a 22.9% rating.
