= May Lamok sa Loob ng Kulambo =

- Theatrical film poster
- Directed by: Danny L. Zialcita
- Story by: Benjamin Pascual
- Produced by: Hirene U. Lopez
- Starring: Gloria Diaz; Eddie Garcia; Amy Austria; Tommy Abuel; Suzanne Gonzales; Lyka Ugarte
- Cinematography: Felizardo Bailen
- Edited by: Enrique Jarlego Jr. (supervising); George Jarlego
- Music by: Demet Velasquez
- Production company: Essex Films
- Release date: May 4, 1984
- Running time: 116 minutes
- Country: Philippines
- Language: Filipino

May Lamok sa Loob ng Kulambo (lit. 'There is a mosquito inside the mosquito net') is a 1984 Filipino comedy film directed by Danny L. Zialcita. The film stars Gloria Diaz, Eddie Garcia, Tommy Abuel, Suzanne Gonzales, Amy Austria and Lyka Ugarte. Produced by Hirene Lopez, the film was released by Essex Films in 1984.

A sequel, May Daga sa Labas ng Lungga, was released later in the same year.

== Synopsis ==
Lauro (Eddie Garcia) is a 62-year-old married man who just loves women. His wife Ellen (Gloria Diaz), a beautiful and strong-willed woman, is dead set in keeping him from womanizing.

== Cast ==
- Gloria Diaz as Ellen
- Eddie Garcia as Lauro "Larry" Rivas
- Amy Austria as Ester Bayugbayugan Jr.
- Lyka Ugarte as Emma
- Tommy Abuel as Manuel
- Suzanne Gonzales as Doray
- Ramon d'Salva as Bitoy
- Lilian Laing as Mama Virra
- Ernie Ortega as Cipriano
- Lucita Soriano as Elvie
- Johnny Vicars as Andoy
- Augusto Victa as Atty. Tengco
- Alma Lerma as Ruperta
- Babette as Babette
- Roy Legaspi as office manager
- Bert Dizon as Corporal

== Production ==
May Lamok sa Loob ng Kulambo is Yoraidyl Diaz Stone's debut film, being cast with the screen name "Lyka Ugarte" at the age of 17 after placing second in the 1983 Mutya ng Pilipinas pageant.
