= Byron Ortile =

Filipino actor

- Born: Byron Spark Ortile; August 24, 2002 (age 23); Rizal, Philippines
- Occupations: Child actor, commercial model
- Years active: 2007–present

Byron Ortile is a Filipino child actor and commercial model, known for his role as Alvin in Sine Novela Gaano Kadalas ang Minsan, playing the son of Marvin Agustin and Camille Prats.

== Career ==
Ortile began as a commercial model. He began acting as a child actor with his debut in Sine Novela Gaano Kadalas ang Minsan. As a child actor, he starred as the younger version of award-winning actors such as Alden Richards and Sid Lucero, as well as portrayed the son of award-winning actresses such as Sharon Cuneta and Claudine Barretto in teleseryes.

== Filmography ==
=== Film ===
Year	Title	Role
2008	Sakal, Sakali, Saklolo	Ken

=== Television ===
Year	Title	Role
2008	Gaano Kadalas Ang Minsan?	Alvin Sanchez
2008	Luna Mystika	young Andoy
2009	All My Life	Luigi Romualdez
2009–2010	Ikaw Sana	Georgie Lorenzo
2010	Claudine	Nathan
2010	Basahang Ginto	Manoro "Michael" Dimarucot Jr.
2011	Amaya	young Bagani
2011	Futbolilits	Topakits de Lantero
2012	Paroa: Ang Kuwento ni Mariposa	young Joko
2012	Nandito Ako	Aladdin Montereal
2013	Madam Chairman	Armando "Junjun" Salvador III
2014	Carmela	young Yago
2015	Ipaglaban Mo: Para Sa Ating Magkakapatid	Aries del Mundo (younger brother of Archie del Mundo)
2015	You're My Home	
