= Kitty Girls (album) =

Studio album by Kitty Girls
- Released: 2008
- Genre: Pinoy pop
- Language: English; Filipino
- Label: Star Records

Kitty Girls' is the self-titled debut album by the Filipino pop girl group Kitty Girls. It was released in 2008 by Star Records.

== Track listing ==
No.	Title	Writer(s)	Length
1.	"Kitty Dance"
2.	"K.I.T.T.Y" (featuring Nathan J)		4:13
3.	"My Boo" (original by Alicia Keys and Usher)	Jermaine Dupri, Manuel Seal, Jr., Adonis Shropshire, Alicia Keys, Usher Raymond
4.	"We in Love"
5.	"Forever" (original by Damage)	Steve Mac, Wayne Hector, Ali Tennant
6.	"Never Ever" (featuring Chris Cayzer, original by All Saints)	Shaznay Lewis, Sean Mather, Robert Jazayeri
7.	"Dancing Naked" (featured on ASAP Supah Dance)
8.	"Kitty Dance" (Minus One)
9.	"K.I.T.T.Y" (Minus One)
10.	"My Boo" (Minus One)
11.	"We in Love" (Minus One)
12.	"Forever" (Minus One)
13.	"Never Ever" (Minus One)
