= Tommy Abuel =

Filipino actor

- Born: Tomas Rosales Abuel Jr. September 16, 1942 (age 83); Tayabas, Tayabas, Philippine Commonwealth
- Other name: Tommy
- Occupations: Actor, lawyer
- Years active: 1973–present

Tomas "Tommy" Rosales Abuel Jr. (born September 16, 1942) is a Filipino actor and lawyer. He won the FAMAS Best Supporting Actor Award for Manila in the Claws of Light (1975) and Karma (1981); and the Cinemalaya Best Actor Award for Dagsin (2016).

He appeared in movies T-Bird at Ako (1982) with Nora Aunor and Vilma Santos, Bituing Walang Ningning (1985) with Sharon Cuneta and Cherie Gil.

He is also an award-winning stage actor. He received the Aliw Award for Best Stage Actor for three consecutive years. His performed in various stage plays such as Antigone, Mga Ibong Mandaragit, Anak ng Araw, Andres Bonifacio, El Filibusterismo, and Florante at Laura, and Kanser, among others. He also performed in musicals like Carousel, The King and I, and West Side Story, among others.

== Filmography ==
=== Film ===
- Mana (TV film; 1973)
- Now and Forever (1973)
- Paru-parong Itim (1973)
- Dalawang Mukha ng Tagumpay (1973)
- Diligin Mo ng Hamog ang Uhaw Na Lupa (1975)
- Manila in the Claws of Light (1975) - Pol
- Itim (1976) - Jun
- Mga Basag Na Kristal (1977)
- Karma (1981) - Alfredo
- T-Bird at Ako (1982) - Jake
- Gaano Kadalas ang Minsan? (1982) - Dr. Eufemio
- To Love Again (1983)
- Nagalit ang Buwan sa Haba ng Gabi (1983)
- Hangurin Mo Ako sa Putik (1983)
- Kung Mahawi Man ang Ulap (1984)
- May Lamok sa Loob ng Kulambo (1984)
- Working Girls (1984)
- Bukas Luluhod ang Mga Tala (1984)
- God Save Me! (1985)
- Lalakwe (1985)
- Bituing Walang Ningning (1985) - Larry Calma
- Bakit Manipis ang Ulap (1985)
- Always in My Heart (1986)
- Walang Karugtong ang Nakaraan (1987)
- Boy Negro (1988) - Max Buan
- Kahit Wala Ka Na (1989)
- Sa Kuko ng Agila (1989)
- Imortal (1989)
- Alyas Pogi: Birador ng Nueva Ecija (1990) - Erning
- Moro (1991)
- Your Dream Is Mine (1992)
- Lumuhod Ka sa Lupa (1993)
- Humanda Ka Mayor!: Bahala Na ang Diyos (1993)
- Inay (1993) - Defense attorney
- Relaks Ka Lang, Sagot Kita (1994) - Defense lawyer
- Forever (1994) - Gusting
- Batas Ko ang Katapat Mo (1995)
- Sana Maulit Muli (1995) - Ben
- Tirad Pass: The Last Stand of Gen. Gregorio del Pilar (1996) - Eusebio "Maestro Sebio" Roque
- Mulanay: Sa Pusod ng Paraiso (1996)
- Ipaglaban Mo II: The Movie (1997)
- Oo Na, Mahal Na Kung Mahal (1999) - Col. Ruiz
- Esperanza: The Movie (1999)
- Senswal: Bakit Masarap ang Bawal (2000)
- Di Kita Ma-Reach (2001)
- Bakat (2002)
- Chavit (2003) - Jose "Celing" Singson
- Don't Give Up on Us (2006)
- Lovebirds (2008)
- Fausta (2009)
- Last Viewing (2009)
- Ang Babae sa Sementeryo (2010)
- Of All the Things (2012) - Umboy's father
- ABCs of Death 2 ("I Is for Invincible" segment; 2014) - Quinito
- Dagsin (2016) - Justino
- Espantaho (2024) - Prof. Manalastas

=== Television ===
| Year | Title | Role | Ref(s) |
|---|---|---|---|
| 1996 | Bayani | Francisco Balagtas | |
| 1996 | Familia Zaragoza | Atty. Nicolas Fuentabella | |
| 1998–1999 | Esperanza | Jaime Ilustre | |
| 2000 | Maalaala Mo Kaya: Life Story Book | Ramon | |
| 2001 | Sa Dulo ng Walang Hanggan | Delfin Cristobal | |
| 2002 | Ang Iibigin ay Ikaw | Atty. Cruz | |
| 2003 | Maalaala Mo Kaya: Puno | Narciso "Jun" Santiago | |
| 2003 | Love to Love: Rich In Love | Don Nats | |
| 2005 | Kung Mamahalin Mo Lang Ako | Enrique | |
| 2007 | Mga Kwento ni Lola Basyang: Ang Mahiwagang Biyulin | Tulome | |
| 2007 | Sine Novela: Kung Mahawi Man ang Ulap | Rogelio Malabanan | |
| 2007 | Maging Sino Ka Man: Ang Pagbabalik | Daniel Jimenez | |
| 2008 | Your Song Presents: My Only Hope | Gener Alejandro | |
| 2009 | Katorse | Mr. King | |
| 2010 | Maalaala Mo Kaya: Titulo | Orso | |
| 2010 | Sabel | Edgardo De Dios | |
| 2011 | Maalaala Mo Kaya: Tindahan | Lino | |
| 2011 | Maalaala Mo Kaya: Tumba-Tumba | Luis | |
| 2011 | Maalaala Mo Kaya: Stroller | Eddie | |
| 2012 | E-Boy | Merlito Vergara | |
| 2012 | Maalaala Mo Kaya: Upuan | Mr. Canlas | |
| 2013 | Kahit Konting Pagtingin | Val Cantada | |
| 2013 | Maalaala Mo Kaya: Letter | Rene Cayetano | |
| 2013 | Wansapanataym: Flores De Yayo | Don Facundo | |
| 2013 | Maalaala Mo Kaya: Drawing | Lolo | |
| 2014 | Maalaala Mo Kaya: Kwintas | Nanding | |
| 2014 | Ang Dalawang Mrs. Real | Justino Salazar | |
| 2014 | Magpakailanman: Nagliliyab na puso: The Mary Jane Decena Lorbes Story | Lando | |
| 2015 | Pari 'Koy | Father John | |
| 2015 | MariMar | Pancho Perez | |
| 2016 | Karelasyon: Old Maid | Abel | |
| 2016 | Karelasyon: Tenant | Vic | |
| 2017 | Destined to be Yours | Vicente Rosales III | |
| 2018 | Cain at Abel | William Bernardino | |
| 2019 | The Better Woman | Ronaldo Valentino | |
| 2021 | First Yaya | Anthony Carlos | |
| 2021 | Legal Wives | Asad Ampang Alonte | |
| 2021–2022 | FPJ's Ang Probinsyano | Don Ignacio Guillermo | |
| 2023–2025 | FPJ's Batang Quiapo | Don Julio Montenegro | |
| 2025 | Sa Gitna ng Unos: The Benhur Abalos Life Story | Benjamin Abalos Sr. | |

== Awards and nominations ==
| Year | Award-giving body | Category/Citation | Work (Year created) | Result |
|---|---|---|---|---|
| 2018 | European Philippine International Film Festival | Best Actor | Dagsin (2016) | Won |
| 2018 | Film Development Council of the Philippines | Film Ambassador | Dagsin (2016) | Awarded |
| 2017 | Los Angeles Philippine International Film Festival | Best Actor | Dagsin (2016) | Won |
| 2017 | PMPC Star Awards for Movies | Best Actor | Dagsin (2016) | Nominated |
| 2017 | Gawad Urian Award | Best Actor | Dagsin (2016) | Nominated |
| 2016 | Cinemalaya | Best Actor | Dagsin (2016) | Won |
| 2007 | 55th FAMAS Award | Best Supporting Actor | Don't Give Up on Us (2006) | Nominated |
| 2007 | FAP Award | Best Supporting Actor | Don't Give Up on Us (2006) | Nominated |
| 1986 | 34th FAMAS Award | Best Supporting Actor | God... Save Me! (1985) | Nominated |
| 1986 | Gawad Urian Award | Best Actor | Bakit Manipis ang Ulap? (1985) | Nominated |
| 1985 | Metro Manila Film Festival | Best Supporting Actor | The Moises Padilla Story: The Missing Chapter (1985) | Won |
| 1985 | 33rd FAMAS Award | Best Supporting Actor | Kriminal (1984) | Nominated |
| 1985 | Gawad Urian Award | Best Actor | Bukas... May Pangarap (1984) | Nominated |
| 1985 | Catholic Mass Media Award | Best Actor | Bukas... May Pangarap (1984) | Won |
| 1984 | 32nd FAMAS Award | Best Supporting Actor | Palabra De Honor (1983) | Nominated |
| 1983 | 31st FAMAS Award | Best Supporting Actor | Gaano Kadalas ang Minsan? (1982) | Nominated |
| 1982 | 30th FAMAS Award | Best Supporting Actor | Karma (1981) | Won |
| 1977 | 25th FAMAS Award | Best Actor | Putik Ka Man... Sa Alabok Magbalik (1976) | Nominated |
| 1977 | Gawad Urian Award | Best Actor | Putik Ka Man... Sa Alabok Magbalik (1976) | Nominated |
| 1976 | 24th FAMAS Award | Best Supporting Actor | Manila in the Claws of Light (1975) | Won |
| 1975 | 23rd FAMAS Award | Best Supporting Actor | La Paloma: Ang Kalapating Ligaw (1974) | Nominated |
