= Emmanuel Borlaza =

Filipino movie screenwriter and director

Emmanuel H. Borlaza

Chairman of the Movie and Television Review and Classification Board Acting
- In office October 2, 2012 – December 5, 2012
- Preceded by: Grace Poe-Llamanzares
- Succeeded by: Eugenio Villareal

Personal details
- Born: Emmanuel H. Borlaza; November 5, 1935 Liliw, Laguna, Commonwealth of the Philippines
- Died: October 11, 2017 (aged 81) Manila, Philippines
- Resting place: Loyola Memorial Park, Marikina
- Occupation: Film director, producer, writer

Emmanuel "Maning" H. Borlaza (November 5, 1935 – October 11, 2017) was a Filipino movie screenwriter and director.

== Early life ==
Born Emmanuel H. Borlaza on November 5, 1935, in Liliw, Laguna.

== Career ==
Borlaza co-wrote and starred in the 1965 film Iginuhit ng Tadhana (The Ferdinand E. Marcos Story).

Borlaza has directed more than 20 films which starred Vilma Santos, including Dyesebel, Darna and the Giants, Lipad, Darna, Lipad!

He also helmed the films of Sharon Cuneta, namely Bukas Luluhod ang Mga Tala, Bituing Walang Ningning, and Dapat Ka Bang Mahalin?

Borlaza directed Eva Fonda 16 starring Alma Moreno and Snooky Serna's Blusang Itim. He was also the director of Dyesebel starring Charlene Gonzales in 1996.

Aside from being vice chairman of the Movie and Television Review and Classification Board, Borlaza also became chairperson of the Directors' Guild of the Philippines, Inc.

Borlaza's last directorial stint was for the film To Saudi with Love starring Dawn Zulueta, Alice Dixson, and Tonton Gutierrez in 1997.

== Filmography ==
=== Film director ===
Title	Year
Alma Bonita	1962
Lantang Bulaklak	1964
Umibig ay Di Biro	1964
Maraming Kulay ng Pag-Ibig	1966
Valentine Wedding	1967
Psycho Maniac	1968
Mindanao	1968
Liku-Likong Landas	1968
Artista ng Aking Asawa	1968
Dugo ng Bampira	1969
Kapatid Ko Ang Aking Ina	1969
Vengadora	1969
Bulaklak at Paru-Paro	1970
Angelo	1970
Counter Attack	1970
Ganid sa Laman	1970
I Love You Honey	1970
Renee Rose	1970
Bulilit Cinderella	1971
I Love You Mama, I Love You Papa	1971
Angelica	1971
Avenida Boy	1971
Aloha Love	1972
Don't Ever Say Goodbye	1972
Remembrance	1972
Dama de Noche	1972
Leron Leron Sinta	1972
Tsismosang Tindera	1973
Lipad, Darna, Lipad!	1973
Dyesebel	1973
Ang Hiwaga ni Maria Cinderella	1973
Darna and the Giants	1973
Batul of Mactan	1974
Nasa Lupa Ang Langit at Impiyerno	1975
Tatlong Kasalanan	1976
Kung Bakit May Ulap Ang Mukha ng Buwan	1976
Anino sa Villa Lagrimas	1976
Mrs. Eva Fonda, 16	1976
Mga Rosas sa Putikan	1976
Mag-Ingat Kayo, Playboy Ako!	1976
The College Girls	1976
Makahiya at Talahib	1976
Mga Bulaklak ng Teatro Manila	1977
Mga Kalapati sa Dewey Boulevard	1977
Sapin-Sapin, Patong-Patong	1977
Pang Adults Lamang	1977
Bakit Kailangan Kita?	1978
Isang Ama, Dalawang Ina	1978
Marupok, Mapusok, Maharot	1978
ABC ng Pag-Ibig	1978
Kampus?	1978
Hatulan si Dodong Diamond	1978
Katawang Alabok	1978
Mahal Kong Taksil	1979
Basta Driver, Sweet Lover	1979
Kadete	1979
Rmansa	1979
Gusto Ko Mahal Ko Siya	1979
Esmeralda at Ruby	1980
Yakapin Mo Ako Lalaking Matapang	1980
Puwede Ba Utol, Akin Siya?	1980
Ding Galing	1980
Sexy Dancers	1980
Free to Love	1981
Abigael	1981
Kasalanan Ba?	1981
Kapitan Kidlat	1981
Just Say You Love Me	1982
Paramng Kailan Lang	1983
Hiula	1983
Laruan	1983
Dapat Ka Bang Mahalin?	1984
Campus Beat	1984
Bukas Luluhod Ang Mga Tala	1984
Shake, Rattle & Roll	1984
Bulaklak ng Magdamag	1985
Bituing Walang Ningning	1985
Yesterday, Today and Tomorrow	1986
Blusang Itim	1986
Paalam Bukas ang Kasal Ko	1986
Ibigay Mo sa Akin ang Bukas	1987
The Sisters	1987
Stolen Monuments	1987
Asawa Ko Huwag Mong Agawin	1987
Rosa Mistica	1987
Puso sa Puso	1988
Isusumbong Kita sa Diyos	1988
Mirror Mirror on the Wall	1988
Paano Tatakasan ang Bukas?	1988
Langit at Lupa	1988
Ang Lahat ng Ito Pati Na ang Langit	1989
3 Mukha ng Pag-Ibig (I Love You, Moomoo)	1989
Kahit Wala Ka Na	1989
Limang Darili ng Diyos	1989
Jessa: Blusang Itim 2	1989
Oras-Oras Arawa-Araw	1989
Bihagin ang Dalagang Ito	1989
Tayo Na Sa Dilim	1990
Bakit Ikaw Pa Rin?	1990
Kaputol ng isang Awit	1991
Isang Linggong Pag-Ibig	1993
Paniwalaan Mo	1993
April Boys: Sana'y Mahalin Mo Rin Ako	1996
Dyesebel	1996
Nakawin Mo Ang Aking Puso	1997
To Saudi With Love	1997
Mapagbigay	2000

=== TV Director ===
Title	Episode	Year	Network
Maalaala Mo Kaya	Rubber Shoes	1991	ABS-CBN
Maalaala Mo Kaya	Lampin	1991	ABS-CBN
Maalaala Mo Kaya	Bola	1991	ABS-CBN
Maalaala Mo Kaya	Sesante	1991	ABS-CBN
Maalaala Mo Kaya	Marriage Contract	1991	ABS-CBN
Maalaala Mo Kaya	Bote	1991	ABS-CBN
Maalaala Mo Kaya	Mananayaw	1991	ABS-CBN
Maalaala Mo Kaya	Bahaghari	1991	ABS-CBN
Maalaala Mo Kaya	Sanggol	1991	ABS-CBN
Maalaala Mo Kaya	Sign Language	1991	ABS-CBN
Maalaala Mo Kaya	Ring	1991	ABS-CBN
Maalaala Mo Kaya	Lapis	1991	ABS-CBN
Maalaala Mo Kaya	Komiks	1991	ABS-CBN
Maalaala Mo Kaya	Talim	1991	ABS-CBN
Maalaala Mo Kaya	Abito	1991	ABS-CBN
Maalaala Mo Kaya	Kuwintas	1991	ABS-CBN
Maalaala Mo Kaya	Tumba-Tumba	1991	ABS-CBN
Maalaala Mo Kaya	Bundok	1992	ABS-CBN
Maalaala Mo Kaya	Piring	1992	ABS-CBN
Maalaala Mo Kaya	Hawla	1992	ABS-CBN
Maalaala Mo Kaya	Paper Weight	1992	ABS-CBN
Maalaala Mo Kaya	Rehas	1992	ABS-CBN

=== Screenplay ===
Title	Year
Hahabul-Habol	1957
Mga Ligaw na Bulaklak	1957
Pulot Gata	1958
Palaboy	1958
Baby Bubut	1958
Ulilang Anghel	1958
Alipin ng Palad	1959
Kahapon Lamang	1959
Cicatriz	1959
Vicky	1959
Isinakdal Ko Ang Aking Ama	1960
Love at First Sight	1960
28 de Mayo	1960
Lawiswis na Kawayan	1960
Tatlong Magdalena	1960
Apat na Yugto ng Buhay	1961
Dalawang Kalbaryo ni Dr. Mendez	1961
Halik sa Lupa	1961
Makasalanang Daigdig	1961
Wen Manang	1961
Pitong Kalbaryo ni Inang	1962
Susanang Twist	1962
Tulisan	1962
Pitong Puso	1962
Susan, Susay, SUsie	1962
Abaruray-Abarinding	1963
Historia de Un Amor	1963
Detektib Kalog	1963
Apat Ang Anak ni David	1963
Mga Kwela sa Eskwela	1963
Ako'y Ibigin Mo, Dalagang Matapang	1963
Esperanza at Caridad	1963
Biniro Lamang Kita	1963
Biniro Lamang Kita	1964
Sa Bilis, Walang Kaparis	1964
Ang Ganda Mo!	1964
Mga Batang Artista	1964
Eskwelahang Munti	1965
Babaing Hudas	1965
Alaala ng Lumipas	1965
Bye-Bye Na si Daddy	1965
Iginuhit ng Tadhana (The Ferdinand E. Marcos Story)	1965
Tsura Lang!	1966
Komrad X	1966
Laman Ang Aking Laman	1966
Till the End of Time	1966
O, Kay Laking Eskandalo!	1966
Puerto Princesa	1966
Sexy Yata Yan	1966
Hanggang Doon Kay Bathala	1966
Yes, I Do!	1967
Valentine Wedding	1967
To Love Again	1967
Oh! What a Kiss!	1967
Kung Ano Ang Puno Siya Ang Bunga	1967
Ito Ang Aking Kasaysayan	1967
Double Date	1967
Bikini Beach Party	1967
Kwatang: A Star is Born	1967
Maruja	1967
Bus Stop	1967
Pogi	1967
Ang Pangarap Ko'y Ikaw	1967
Sayonara My Darling	1968
Room For Rent	1968
Liku-Likong Landas	1968
Kailanma'y Di Ka Mag-Iisa	1968
Ikaw ay Akin, Ako ay Sa Ito	1968
Elizabeth	1968
Bandana	1968
Artista Ang AKing Asawa	1968
Alipin ng Busabos	1968
Dugo ng Vampira	1969
Pinagbuklod ng Langit	1969
Rowena	1969
Leslie	1969
Vengadora	1969
Bulaklak at Paru-Paro	1970
Haydee	1970
Angelo	1970
Ganid sa Laman	1970
I Love You Honey	1970
Casa Fuego	1970
Renee Rose	1970
Bulilit Cinderella	1971
I Love Mama, I Love Papa	1971
Aloha My Love	1972
Don't Ever Say Goodbye	1972
Remembrance	1972
Dyesebel	1973
Darna and the Giants	1973
Nasa Lupa Ang Langit at Impyerno	1975
Mga Rosas sa Putikan	1976
Mag-Ingat Kayo, Playboy Ako!	1976
Makahiya at Talahib	1976
Campus Beat	1984
Paalam, Bukas ang Kasal Ko	1986
Huwag Mong Itanong Kung Bakit	1986
Rosenda	1989
Kapag Langit ang Humatol	1990
Maging Sino Ka Man	1991
Di Na Natuto: Sorry Na, Puwede Ba?	1993
Oo Na Sige Na	1994
Kapantay ay Langit	1994
Dyesebel	1996
Kristo	1996
Seventeen	1999
Tinik	2013

=== Story ===
Title	Year
Limang Misteryo ng Krus	1960
Abaruray-Abarinding	1963
Historia de Un Amor	1963
Birds of Paradise	1963
Ikaw at Ikaw Rin	1963
Apat Ang Anak ni David	1963
Mga Kwela sa Eskwela	1963
Ako'y Ibigin Mo, Dalagang Matapang	1963
Biniro Lamang Kita	1964
Sa Bilis, Walang Kaparis	1964
Ang Ganda Mo!	1964
Puerto Princesa	1966
Valentine Wedding	1967
Kung Ano Ang Puno Siya Ang Bunga	1967
Haydee	1970
I Love You Honey	1970
Casa Fuego	1970
Renee Rose	1970
Aloha My Love	1972
Don't Ever Say Goodbye	1972
Remembrance	1972
Tsismosang Tindera	1973
Darna and the Giants	1973
Nasa Lupa Ang Langit at Impyerno	1975
Mga Rosas sa Putikan	1976
Mag-Ingat Kayo, Playboy Ako!	1976
Campus Beat	1984
Paalam, Bukas Ang Kasal Ko	1986
Maging Sino Ka Man	1991
Di Na Natuto: Sorry Na, Puwede Ba?	1993
Oo Na Sige Na	1994
Kapantay ay Langit	1994
Seventeen	1999

=== Movie Writer ===
Title	Year
Sweet Valentines ("Some Enchanted Evening")	1963
Maraming Kulay ng Pag-Ibig	1966
Ay Ay Naku Neneng!	1966
Headlines	1966
Gaano Kita Kamahal	1993
Bakit Ngayon Ka Lang?	1993
April Boys: Sana'y Mahalin Mo Rin Ako	1994

=== TV Writer ===
Title	Episode	Year	Network
Maalaala Mo Kaya	Sanggol	1991	ABS-CBN
