= Kitty Girls =

Filipino all-female singing group

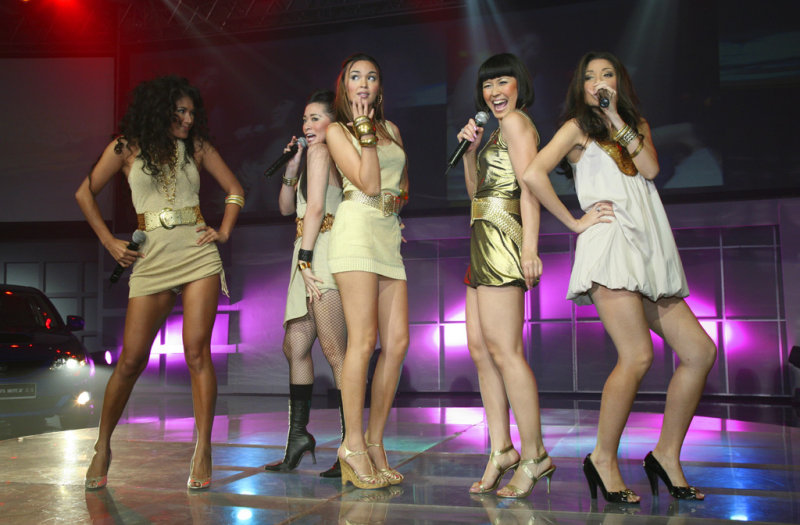
- The original line up of the Kitty Girls during the 2007 Subaru Impreza WRX launch. L-R: Ayanna Oliva, Tanya Yuquimpo, Jocelyn Oxlade, Nicole Deen and Veronica Scott

Background information
- Origin: Manila, Philippines
- Genres: P-pop
- Years active: 2007–2013
- Labels: Star Music; manager: Arlie Salagantin
- Past members: Jocelyn Oxlade (2007–2013); Ayanna Oliva (2007–2013); Khai Lim (2010–2013); Veronica Scott (2007–2009); Nicole Deen (2007–2009); Angeli Montero (2009–2010); Tanya Yuquimpo (2007–2009)

Kitty Girls was a Filipino girl group formed in the Philippines in April 2007. The group began as a quintet consisting of Jocelyn Oxlade, Ayanna Oliva, Veronica Scott, Nicole Deen and Tanya Yuquimpo. In 2010, the group relaunched as a trio with Khai Lim joining Oxlade and Oliva.

== History ==
=== Formation and debut album ===
In 2007, under the guidance of Cecille Carpio of Elan Models International and Jose Felix Dingcong of JLD Management, the Kitty Girls were signed to Star Music. The original line up, consisting of five Filipinas with foreign blood, Jocelyn Oxlade, Ayanna Oliva, Veronica Scott, Tanya Yuquimpo and Nicole Deen, would open up for Akon in the Akon—Live in Manila concert in November and would feature in the cover of FHM Philippines' December 2007 issue.

In January 2008, the group launched their self-titled debut album Kitty Girls. The single "K.I.T.T.Y.". was launched and performed live by the group in ABS-CBN's Sunday variety show ASAP.

On February 15, 2008, the Kitty Girls staged their first major concert dubbed One purr...fect Kitty Night. The same year, the group would become official Philippine endorsers of Sharp televisions.

=== Line up change, relaunch and new single ===
The Promo Image for the Kitty Girls' We On Fire Concert.

Over time the group would become a trio, with Oxlade, Oliva and Scott, in TV appearances.

In June 2010, the group was relaunched as a trio, at an event at The Fort in Taguig, with Khai Lim joining Oxlade and Oliva, and sang their new single "We On Fire"—which debuted on DWFM U92 a week earlier, live for the first time. In an interview with Nelson Canlas for 24 Oras' "Chika Minute" segment, Oxlade revealed that the other girls left the group to return to their respective countries and some to go back to their studies.

A year later, the trio would tour Malaysia for Pernod Ricard's Ambassadeurs De La Marques Presents Stellar.

== TV appearances ==
Year	Title	Role	Notes
2007-08	ASAP '07	Themselves - Hosts / Performers	Semi-regular cast
2008	POP Myx	Myx celebrity VJs	
2008	Us Girls Summer Fashion TV Special	Performers	Guest
2008	Umagang Kay Ganda	Performers	Guest
2009	Eat Bulaga!	Themselves - Hosts / Performers	Semi-regular cast
2009	SOP Rules	Themselves - Hosts / Performers	
2009	Showtime	Themselves - Judges / Performers	Guest
2011	Laugh Out Loud	Panelist	Guest, 1 episode

== Discography ==
=== Studio albums ===
Year	Album	Certifications (sales thresholds)
2008	Kitty Girls: Released: Label: Star Music; Format: CD, digital download	

=== Singles ===
Title	Year	Certifications	Album
"K.I.T.T.Y"	2008		Kitty Girls
"Forever"	2008		Kitty Girls
"We on Fire"	2010		

=== Other appearances ===
==== Compilation appearances ====
Year	Album	Song(s)	Label(s)
2008	ASAP Supah Dance	"Dancing Naked"	ASAP Music/Star Music
