= Amy Austria =

Filipino actress (born 1961)

Amy Austria-Ventura
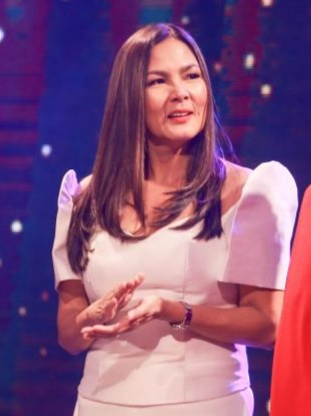
- Austria at the Sine Sandaan 2019
- Born: Esmeralda Dizon Tuazon; December 13, 1961 (age 64); Tondo, Manila, Philippines
- Occupation: Actress
- Years active: 1976–present
- Spouse: Duke Ventura (m. 1999)
- Partner: Jay Ilagan (1983–1992)
- Children: 1

Esmeralda Dizon Tuazon-Ventura (born December 13, 1961), professionally known as Amy Austria (Tagalog: [ˈami ˈʔaʊstɾija bɛnˈtʊɾa]), is a Filipino film and television actress. She is a recipient of a FAMAS Award, two Gawad Urian Awards, three FAP Awards and four MMFF Awards (including three Best Actress wins).

The Philippine Star listed Austria among the 15 Best Actresses of All Time. In 2019, Austria was inducted at the Hall of Fame at the Metro Manila Film Festival.

== Life and career ==
Esmeralda Dizon Tuazon is the second to the eldest among six children born in 1961 to an impoverished family. She helped the family by selling chewing gum. She studied at the Rajah Soliman High School. She was introduced to the producer Baby Martinez of MBM Productions through a common friend. She was then cast in Bitayin si... Baby Ama? (1976), the film that made a star of Rudy Fernandez. After her second film, Alas (1976), with Jun Aristorenas, she was given minor parts in several other pictures then dropped out of the film industry for almost a year. When she came back in mid-1977, contract star of Jesse Ejercito's Seven Star Productions. She became quite visible in the 1970s, in such films like Dabiana (1977), Miss Dulce Amor, Ina (1978), Atsay (1978), Menor de Edad (1979), Gabun: Ama Mo, Ama Ko (1979), Bedspacers (1979) and Swing It, Baby (1979). After acting in two very relevant films for 1979, Ishmael Bernal's Aliw and Lino Brocka's Jaguar, Austria was finally a lead star in Nang Bumuka Ang Sampaguita (1980). Throughout the first half of the 1980s, Austria became a busy actress: Langis at Tubig (1980), Sugat sa Ugat (1980), Goriong Butete (1980), Tondo Girl (1981), Pusong Uhaw (1982), Waywaya (1982), and May Lamok sa Loob ng Kulambo (1984).

After a three-year hiatus from lead roles, Austria was cast in 1988 for the titular role in Celestina Sanchez, a.k.a. Bubbles – Enforcer: Ativan Gang by director Carlo J. Caparas and his wife, producer Donna Villa. However, Austria was ultimately dissatisfied with how its production was handled, with the film's original 13-day shooting schedule in August extending to December, when it was needed to be screened for the organizing committee of the 1988 Metro Manila Film Festival in order to qualify. On December 20, 1988, five days before the festival, she filed a lawsuit against Caparas and Villa for injunction and damages after they used another person to dub her voice in the film, while Caparas later testified that she did not appear during the recording session for her character's dialogue in time for the film's committee screening. Nevertheless, she managed to win the festival award for Best Actress.

In the 1990s and well into the 21st century, she continued to receive acclaim for her supporting performances, such as in The Flor Contemplacion Story (1995), Muro-Ami (1999), Anak (2000), Pagdating ng Panahon (2001), and I Will Always Love You (2006). Anak is her second reunion film with Vilma Santos, after Langis at Tubig and Paano Ba ang Mangarap?.

In the 2000s, Austria came back to acting Via small screen in 2000; she was part of the television drama Pangako sa 'Yo (known in English as The Promise) from 2000 to 2002 on ABS-CBN as Lourdes in 2003, she starred in GMA-7 oriented programs such as Kirara, Ano'ng Kulay ng Pag-ibig?, the fantasy series Mulawin from 2004 to 2005 and its film adaptation. She also made an appearance on another GMA program entitled Narito ang Puso Ko.

In 2006, she returned to ABS-CBN for the television remake of Bituing Walang Ningning, which was extended for another month. She played a new character in the TV series made by novelist and comic creator Nerissa Cabral as an antagonist and mother to Angelika Dela Cruz's lead character Lavina as Barbara Arguelles the stage mother and con artist who has a share of her downfall. The series attained 42% percent high share in television ratings. This was her second screentime with Dela Cruz. Austria accepted another for another Primetime Drama from a classic film and remake Walang Kapalit as a supporting character again from 2008 to 2010. She took a break from offers from TV and film.

In 2011, she accepted the military primetime drama Minsan Lang Kita Iibigin, which aired from March 7, 2011, to August 19, 2011. She took the role with the help from her cousin Lorna Tolentino and reunited her fellow veteran screen actors, such as Boots Anson Roa, Ronaldo Valdez, and Tonton Gutierrez, and John Estrada and her first with Coco Martin, and Maja Salvador and Andi Eigenmann.

In 2012, she starred in Lorenzo's Time with Zaijan Jaranilla, In 2013, she was seen on the lifestyle entertainment talk show Inside the Cinema with Boy Abunda on Cinema One, and in 2014, she became a part of Ikaw Lamang on its second Book as the older version of Kim Chiu's character Isabel with fellow award-winning actors Joel Torre, Rio Locsin, Nonie Buencamino, and Christopher de Leon and also her reunion with Coco Martin, on their second series appearances. In 2015, she was seen in remake of Pangako Sa 'Yo as the adoptive mother of Kathryn Bernardo's character.

After she became part of the primetime television series Halik as the mother of Jericho Rosales' character, Austria returned to GMA Network for One of the Baes and Hearts on Ice, respectively.

== Personal life ==
Austria was previously married to actor Jay Ilagan. In 1999, she married Duke Ventura.

Austria admitted to previously having a drug addiction, particularly methamphetamine, for six years, which ended after Christopher de Leon introduced her to a religious retreat.

== Filmography ==
=== Film ===
Year	Title	Role
1976	Bitayin si... Baby Ama?	
1976	Ang Bulag, ang Pipi at ang Bingi	
1976	Tsuperstar	
1977	Ang Pagbabalik ni Harabas at Bulilit	
1977	Binata ang Daddy Ko!	
1977	Dabiana	Susan Romero
1978	Blood Run	
1978	Sabi Barok, Lab Ko Dabiana	
1978	Isinilang Ko'y Hindi Ko Tunay Na Anak	
1978	Miss Dulce Amor, Ina	
1978	Atsay	
1978	Garrote: Jai-Alai King	
1978	Salonga	
1979	Menor de Edad	
1979	Swing It... Baby!	
1979	Kay Haba ng Gabi, Kay Iksi ng Umaga	
1979	Shoot-to-Kill	
1979	Jaguar	Cristy Montes
1979	Gabun: Ama Mo, Ama Ko	
1979	Aliw	
1979	Bedspacers	
1980	Totoy Balasa	
1980	Hepe	
1980	Uhaw sa Kalayaan	
1980	Nang Bumuka ang Sampaguita	
1980	Sugat sa Ugat	
1980	Alaga	
1980	Playmates	
1980	Brutal	Monica Real
1980	Langis at Tubig	Pilar Jarlego
1981	Kontrobersyal!	Carla Rivera
1981	Laya	
1981	Cover Girls	
1981	Ako ang Hari	
1981	Burgis	Nedy
1981	Pabling	
1981	Hotel House Detective	
1981	Tondo Girl	
1981	Caught in the Act	Cedes
1982	Pusong Uhaw	
1982	Waywaya	
1982	Kumander Elpidio Paclibar	
1982	Berdugo	
1982	Katas ng Langis	
1982	Bad Boy from Dadiangas	
1983	Palabra de Honor	
1983	Paano Ba ang Mangarap?	
1983	Lintik Lang ang Walang Ganti!	
1984	Kung Mahawi Man ang Ulap	
1984	May Lamok sa Loob ng Kulambo	Ester Bayung-bayongan Jr.
1984	Mga Batang Yagit	
1985	Escort Girls	
1985	Hinugot sa Langit	Stella
1987	Ibigay Mo sa Akin ang Bukas	
1988	Celestina Sanchez, a.k.a. Bubbles – Enforcer: Ativan Gang	Celestina "Bubbles" Sanchez
1992	Narito ang Puso Ko	Dolly Sanchez
1993	Kung Mawawala Ka Pa	
1995	Patayin sa Sindak si Barbara	Arlene
1995	Campus Girls	Criselda
1995	The Flor Contemplacion Story	Delia Maga
1996	Sa Aking mga Kamay	Anne
1996	Kristo	Mary Magdalene
1996	Nananabik... Sa 'yong Pagbabalik	
1996	Trudis Liit	Magna
1997	Anak ng Dilim	Magda
1997	Ako Lang sa Langit	Bebang
1997	Frats	
1998	Shirley	
1999	Anak ng Dilim	Magda
1999	Bullet	
1999	Muro-Ami	Susan
2000	Anak	Lyn
2001	Hostage	Via Morales
2001	Pagdating ng Panahon	Ate Soni
2001	Bagong Buwan	Fatima
2002	Small Voices	Luz
2002	Mano Po	Linda Go-dela Madrid
2003	Magnifico	Tessie
2003	Woman of Breakwater	Jovy
2004	Annie B.	
2004	Singles	
2004	Beautiful Life	Benita
2004	Mano Po III: My Love	Lilia's mother
2005	Mulawin: The Movie	Lourdes
2006	I Will Always Love You	Encar
2015	The Last Pinoy Action King	Herself
2019	Man and Wife	Idad

=== Television ===
Year	Title	Role
1983–1985	Yagit	Dolor
1995–1996	Kadenang Kristal	Clarissa
1999	Kirara, Ano ang Kulay ng Pag-ibig?	Rose
2000	Umulan Man o Umaraw	Chona
2000–2002	Pangako Sa 'Yo	Lourdes Magpantay-Buenavista
2003–2004	Narito ang Puso Ko	Elsa Campuspos
2004–2005	Mulawin	Lourdes
2004	Magpakailanman	
2005	Now and Forever: Mukha	Fatima
2005–2006	Sugo	Graciela
2006	Bituing Walang Ningning	Barbara Arguelles
2007	Walang Kapalit	Ceding
2011	Minsan Lang Kita Iibigin	Lora Sebastiano-del Tierro / Rosa Sta. Maria
2012	Tanikala: Ang Ikaapat ng Yugto - Unos	Lupe
2012	Lorenzo's Time	Mildred Montereal-Gamboa
2014	Ikaw Lamang	Señora Isabelle Miravelez-Hidalgo
2015–2016	Pangako sa 'Yo	Belen Macaspac
2017	The Promise of Forever	Olivia Ortega-Borja
2018–2019	Halik	Dolores "Dolor" Salvador-Bartolome
2019	Magpakailanman	
2019–2020	One of the Baes	Josephine "Jo" Rubio / Josephine De La Cruz Aragoza
2019	Dear Uge: Monito Monita	Chynna
2020	24/7	Lourdes Jacinto
2023	Hearts on Ice	Liberty "Libay" Bravo-Martinez
2023	Magpakailanman	
2024	Shining Inheritance	Rosario
2025	Magpakailanman	
2025	Mommy Dearest	Ligaya Espiritu
2025	Tadhana: Fake Love	Pilar
2025	Sanggang-Dikit FR	Mrs. Ellen Sison
2026	Magpakailanman: Ang Inang Di Sumuko	Minerva Panganiban
2026	Kamao	Gloria Panganiban

== Awards and nominations ==
Year	Award/Category	Nominated work	Result
1979	FAMAS Award	Best Supporting Actress for Atsay	Nominated
1980	Metro Manila Film Festival	Best Actress for Brutal	Won
1980	Gawad Urian Award	Best Supporting Actress (Pinakamahusay na Pangalawang Aktres) for Jaguar	Won
1981	FAMAS Award	Best Actress for Brutal	Won
1982	Gawad Urian Award	Best Supporting Actress (Pinakamahusay na Pangalawang Aktres) for Ako ang Hari	Nominated
1986	Gawad Urian Award	Best Supporting Actress (Pinakamahusay na Pangalawang Aktres) for Hinugot sa langit	Nominated
1986	FAMAS Award	Best Supporting Actress for Hinugot sa langit	Nominated
1988	Metro Manila Film Festival	Best Actress for Celestina Sanchez	Won
1989	Catholic Mass media Award	Best Actress for Celestina Sanchez	Won
1989	FAP Award	Best Actress for Celestina Sanchez	Won
1989	FAMAS Award	Best Actress for Celestina Sanchez	Nominated
1993	Metro Manila Film Festival	Best Supporting Actress for Kung Mawawala Ka Pa	Won
1993	Gawad Urian Award	Best Supporting Actress (Pinakamahusay na Pangalawang Aktres) for Narito ang Puso Ko	Won
1993	FAP Award	Best Supporting Actress for Narito ang puso ko	Won
1994	Gawad Urian Award	Best Supporting Actress (Pinakamahusay na Pangalawang Aktres) for Kung Mawawala Ka Pa	Nominated
1994	FAMAS Award	Best Supporting Actress for Kung Mawawala Ka Pa	Nominated
1996	Metro Manila Film Festival	Best Actress for Trudis Liit	Won
1996	Gawad Urian Award	Best Supporting Actress (Pinakamahusay na Pangalawang Aktres) for Nena	Nominated
1996	Young Critics Circle, Philippines	Best Performance by Male or Female, Adult or Child, Individual or Ensemble in Leading or Supporting Role for Nena	Nominated
2001	FAP Award	Best Supporting Actress for The Child	Won
2002	FAMAS Awards	Best Actress for New Moon	Nominated
2003	Gawad Urian Awards	Best Supporting Actress (Pinakamahusay na Pangalawang Aktres) for Mano Po	Nominated
2003	FAMAS Awards	Best Supporting Actress for Mano Po	Nominated
2005	FAP Awards, Philippines	Best Supporting Actress for Beautiful Life	Nominated
2005	Golden Screen Awards, Philippines	Best Performance by an Actress in a Leading Role (Drama) for Beautiful Life	Nominated
2005	ENPRESS Golden Screen Entertainment TV Awards	Outstanding Lead Supporting Actress in a Drama Series for Mulawin	Won
2011	25th Star Awards for TV	Best Drama Actress for Minsan Lang Kita Iibigin	Nominated
2012	Eastwood City Walk Of Fame	Celebrity Inductee	Won
2013	27th PMPC Star Awards for TV	Best Drama Supporting Actress for Lorenzo's Time	Nominated
2014	28th PMPC Star Awards for TV	Best Drama Supporting Actress for Ikaw Lamang	Nominated
2015	29th PMPC Star Awards for TV	Best Supporting Actress for Pangako sa 'Yo	Nominated
