= Init sa Magdamag (film) =

1983 erotic drama film by Laurice Guillen

- Official movie poster
- Directed by: Laurice Guillen
- Written by: Raquel Villavicencio
- Produced by: Ramon Salvador
- Starring: Lorna Tolentino; Dindo Fernando; Joel Torre
- Cinematography: Romy Vitug
- Edited by: Efren Jarlego
- Music by: Willy Cruz
- Production company: Viva Films
- Distributed by: Viva Films
- Release date: September 22, 1983
- Running time: 100 minutes
- Country: Philippines
- Language: Filipino

Init sa Magdamag (transl.: Heat at Overnight) is a 1983 Filipino erotic drama film directed by Laurice Guillen from a story and screenplay by Raquel Villavicencio. The film stars Lorna Tolentino, Dindo Fernando and Joel Torre.

== Synopsis ==
After a tragic scandal, Irene runs away from her past and transforms into Becky, her new personality. Becky falls in love with Armand but is blackmailed by his family due to her dark past. She reinvents herself again to become Leah, a high-fashion model. Leah engages in an intense and manipulative relationship with Jamie, a rich hedonist. When she reunites with Armand, she finds herself torn between the man she loves and her sexual partner who fulfills her deepest desires.

== Cast ==
- Lorna Tolentino as Irene / Becky Claudio / Leah Sanchez
- Dindo Fernando as Jaime Apacible
- Joel Torre as Armand Javier
- Anita Linda as Sion
- Wendy Villarica as Katrina Jimenez
- Leo Martinez as Mr. Perez
- Bebong Osorio as Man in the Bar
- Ding Salvador as Mr. Eleazar
- Franklin Llamas as Francis
- Remy Novales as Mrs. Eleazar
- Melissa Mendez as Jaime's Date
- Elsa Agana as Party Girl
- Conrado Lamano as Mayor
- Nonoy Zuñiga as Singer

== Awards ==
Year	Awards	Category	Recipient	Result	Ref.
1984	9th Gawad Urian Awards	Best Director	Laurice Guillen	Nominated	
1984	9th Gawad Urian Awards	Best Cinematography	Romy Vitug	Nominated	
1984	9th Gawad Urian Awards	Best Production Design	Benjie de Guzman	Nominated	
1984	9th Gawad Urian Awards	Best Sound	Vic Macamay	Nominated	

== Theme song ==
The theme song of the same name was originally performed by Sharon Cuneta and Nonoy Zuñiga. It gained popularity before the movie was released. Other covers include Ariel Rivera, Jun Polistico, Marvin Ong, and Maffy Soler, which was used as the theme song of the 2011 television series Mga Nagbabagang Bulaklak, and Jona, which was used as the theme song of the 2021 television series of the same name.
