= Ayanna Oliva =

Filipino musician

- Birth name: Ayanna Oliva
- Born: June 13, 1986
- Origin: Philippines
- Genres: P-pop
- Occupation(s): Singer, model, VJ
- Years active: 2004–2010

Ayanna Oliva is a Filipino model, singer, dancer, and former VJ. She was a member of the Kitty Girls.

== Biography ==
=== Career ===
Ayanna started her showbiz career as a VJ in Studio 23. She, along with three other VJs, won the 2004 Studio 23 VJ Hunt.

A year later, Ayanna sang on "Bulong ng Damdamin" with Boy2 Quizon on the latter's debut album Biyaheng Reggae released under GMA Records.

Oliva, Angel Locsin and four other girls were part of the Axe Choose the Girl, Spend Her Money Promo, where they fulfilled five lucky men's dreams by giving them an unforgettable date and almost half a million pesos worth of a shopping spree.

In 2007, Oliva and four other girls formed the girl group Kitty Girls. The following year they were signed under Star Records.

== Filmography ==
Television
Year	Title	Role	Notes
2004–2006	Studio 23	Herself/VJ	
2005	Axe Choose the Girl, Spend Her Money Promo TV ad	Herself	
2009	Showtime	Herself/judge	
2010	Moomoo and Me	Mayumi	Guest, 1 episode
2010	Showtime	Herself	Pioneer judge, 3 weeks

== Discography ==
- 2005: "Bulong ng Damdamin" with Boy 2 Quizon on Biyaheng Reggae
