= Jay Ramirez =

Colombian born Speed skater (born 1985)

Jay Ramirez (born 1985) is a Colombian born speed skater.

== Early life ==
Born in Anserma, Colombia, Jay Ramirez moved to London at the age of 12 and trained as a figure skater at the Queensway Ice Rink.
