= Gaano Kadalas ang Minsan? =

1982 romantic drama film by Danny Zialcita

- Official movie poster
- Directed by: Danny Zialcita
- Screenplay by: Danny Zialcita; Tom D. Adrales
- Story by: Tom D. Adrales
- Produced by: Ramon Salvador
- Starring: Vilma Santos; Hilda Koronel; Dindo Fernando
- Cinematography: Felizardo Bailen
- Edited by: Ike Jarlego Jr.
- Music by: George Canseco
- Production company: Viva Films
- Distributed by: Viva Films
- Release date: November 25, 1982
- Running time: 109 minutes
- Country: Philippines
- Language: Filipino

Gaano Kadalas ang Minsan? (lit. 'How Often Is Sometimes?') is a 1982 Filipino romantic drama film directed by Danny Zialcita and co-written by Tom D. Adrales. It stars Vilma Santos, Hilda Koronel, and Dindo Fernando.

Produced and distributed by Viva Films, the film was theatrically released on November 25, 1982, became a box-office success, and was the year's highest-grossing film. It won six FAMAS Awards, including Best Screenplay (Zialcita and Adrales), Best Story (Adrales), and Best Musical Score (Canseco).

== Plot ==
=== A Father's Promise ===
Lily, a devoted single mother, raises her son Alvin, who suffers from congenital heart disease. Despite his condition, Alvin's greatest wish is to meet his father— yet the identity of his biological father remains a mystery. Desperate for guidance, Lily turns to her best friend Elsa. In an unexpected turn, Elsa suggests that her husband, Louie, step in and assume the role of Alvin’s father. Though initially hesitant, Louie eventually agrees. When they meet, Elsa introduces him to Alvin as 'Larry,' and Louie forms a bond with the young boy, cherishing every moment. During a family outing, Alvin experiences severe difficulty breathing, revealing the heartbreaking truth that his time is limited. Determined to make the most of what’s left, Louie commits to spending Alvin’s final days with him.

=== Beneath the Silent Tears ===
When Elsa visits Lily, she admits to Louie that she feels jealous of her and confesses a deep, painful truth: if Alvin dies, she will lose him forever, and with him, Louie will be lost to her memory as well. Despite the tension, Lily, Alvin, and Louie visit Elsa to celebrate Christmas. Alvin, excited to play, runs outside to hide and seek with Louie. However, Louie soon finds Alvin unconscious, and despite their desperate attempts to save him, it’s too late. The heartache is unbearable.

Not long after, Lily discovers she’s pregnant, and Louie, guilt-ridden and torn, begins visiting her, spending time together as they navigate this new chapter. When Elsa learns of the pregnancy, she harbors an unsettling desire to raise the child as her own. She presses Louie to let her take the baby once it's born, but Louie, deeply conflicted, refuses. He explains that every time he would look at the child, he would be reminded of his mistakes—unless, of course, Elsa were barren. This disagreement leads to a painful rift, and Elsa and Louie part ways.

Distraught, Lily seeks an abortion, despite a heated argument with her friend. She recalls how, when she was pregnant with Alvin, her own heart condition made it impossible for her to keep him. Just as the procedure is about to begin, Louie arrives in time to save her, confronting Lily with the truth that their meeting wasn’t by chance—Elsa had orchestrated it to ensure she would have a child. In a moment of raw vulnerability, Louie confesses his love for Lily. But Lily, still torn by loyalty to Elsa, insists that Louie and Elsa are still legally married.

Lily and Elsa finally meet, where Lily apologizes for the affair, seeking forgiveness for her role in the complicated love triangle. Though Lily gives birth to a son, the joy is short-lived—she dies shortly after the delivery. When Elsa asks to see the child, the painful truth is revealed: the baby has died as well.

Louie arrives too late. Elsa apologizes to Louie about what happened. He then tells Lily that she had lost not only a friend, a child, and a husband, but also her life.

== Cast ==
- Vilma Santos as Lily
- Hilda Koronel as Elsa
- Dindo Fernando as Louie
- Suzanne Gonzales as Nina
- Joseph Alvin Enriquez as Alvin
- Angie Ferro as Abortionist
- Odette Khan as Alvin's Teacher
- Mario Escudero as Fencing Instructor
- Ven Medina as Priest
- Gloria Romero as Elsa's Mother
- Josephine Estrada as Diana
- Ronaldo Valdez as Eric
- Tommy Abuel as Dr. Eufemio
- Anna Gonzales as Gynaecologist
- Delia Razon as Obstetrician
- Chanda Romero as Charley

== Release ==
Gaano Kadalas ang Minsan was released on November 25, 1982, and was a box-office success, becoming the highest-grossing film of the year.

== Reception ==
=== Critical response ===
Justino Dormiendo, writing for Jingle Extra Hot!, gave the film a positive review, praising the entire cast for their performances and director Danny Zialcita for finding a fresh angle on a cliché love triangle storyline. He gave high acclaim to Vilma Santos' performance as the mistress Lily, stating that "[b]ecause her role has more substance and because [she] seemed to have perfected the agony of the other woman, her performance overshadowed Hilda Koronel's", while Dindo Fernando was "effective" in his performance as Louie. However, Dormiendo criticized the costume design for being overly conspicuous and distracting.

=== Accolades ===
Group	Category	Name	Result
FAMAS Awards	Best Screenplay	Danny Zialcita, Tom D. Adrales	Won
FAMAS Awards	Best Story	Tom D. Adrales	Won
FAMAS Awards	Best Editing	Ike Jarlego Jr.	Won
FAMAS Awards	Best Musical Score	George Canseco	Won
FAMAS Awards	Best Song	"Gaano Kadalas ang Minsan" by George Canseco	Won
FAMAS Awards	Best Sound	Vic Macamay	Won
FAP Awards	Best Sound	Vic Macamay	Won
