= Ang Panday (1980 film) =

1980 Filipino film directed by Ronwaldo Reyes

- Theatrical poster of the digitally-restored release
- Directed by: Ronwaldo Reyes
- Screenplay by: Fred Navarro
- Story by: Carlo J. Caparas
- Based on: Ang Panday by Carlo J. Caparas and Steve Gan
- Produced by: FPJ
- Starring: Fernando Poe, Jr.
- Cinematography: Ver Reyes
- Edited by: Augusto Salvador
- Music by: Ernani Cuenco
- Color process: Eastmancolor
- Production company: FPJ Productions
- Release date: December 25, 1980 (Metro Manila Film Festival)
- Running time: 114 minutes
- Country: Philippines
- Language: Filipino

Ang Panday (lit. 'The Blacksmith') is a 1980 Philippine dark fantasy action film produced and directed by Fernando Poe Jr., who also stars as the titular character. It is based on the fictional comics character of the same name, created by Carlo J. Caparas and illustrated by Steve Gan.

The film was followed by three sequels, which also featuring Poe as Flavio, namely Pagbabalik ng Panday (1981), Ang Panday: Ikatlong Yugto (1982) and Ang Panday IV: Ika-Apat Na Aklat (1984). All four films were shown at the Metro Manila Film Festival in their respective years.

An animated television series, dubbed as the first full-length Filipino animation series, was shown in RPN 9 during the mid-1980s. It was patterned after the storyline of the first movie.

== Plot ==
Flavio (Fernando Poe, Jr.) is a "Panday" (or blacksmith) whose village and land are under the reign of the tyrant Lizardo (Max Alvarado). Flavio is forced to brand innocent children every night with Lizardo's mark by the head of Lizardo's men in the village, Pilo (Paquito Diaz).

One day, Flavio's predecessor as Panday, Tata Temyong (Lito Anzures) finds the legendary "Black Book" that supposedly tells how Lizardo can be defeated. Later that night, a meteorite lands in a nearby field. Based on a prophecy in the Black Book, Flavio and Tata Temyong then use the meteorite and an old bell to create a magic dagger, the only weapon that can defeat Lizardo. After finishing the weapon, Flavio hunts down Lizardo's men in the village. Flavio then brands them before setting off with Tata Temyong, his young apprentice Lando (Bentot Jr.), and Monica (Liz Alindogan), a woman he had saved from Lizardo's men, to defeat the evil tyrant.

Flavio and his companions soon come across a seaside hut where they believe Lizardo dwells. Instead, it is home to one of Lizardo's henchmen, a wizard whom Flavio defeats. Afterwards, Flavio and his allies are attacked by siyokoy (mermen) that are supposed to attack anyone branded as Lizardo's slaves who try to escape. They are driven away when Flavio's dagger hums. When Pilo and his men arrive seeking revenge against Flavio, they attack and eat Pilo and his men instead. Tata Temyong explains that since Monica was not branded, unlike everyone else, she was spared.

Later, Flavio and his companions are attacked by zombies in a forest. Tata Temyong and Monica end up separated and captured by Lizardo's men. Elsewhere, Lando finds refuge in a hut haunted by an aswang, and after a chase, Flavio finds and defeats it with his dagger. Tata Temyong and Monica are then brought to Lizardo's fortress.

After hearing of Flavio's quest from Tata Temyong, Lizardo challenges Flavio to a duel in the desert. Lizardo brings Tata Temyong, Monica, and all his slaves to witness the battle. Lizardo first orders his men to attack Flavio, who, though vastly outnumbered, defeats them after his dagger transforms into a sword. Lizardo then faces Flavio himself, only to rapidly age every time Flavio hits him. Flavio ends the duel by stabbing Lizardo in the chest, who dies and fades away. With Lizardo defeated, Flavio leads his companions and the former slaves to freedom.

== Cast and characters ==
- Fernando Poe, Jr. as Flavio
- Max Alvarado as Lizardo
- Bentot Jr. as Lando
- Liz Alindogan as Monica
- Paquito Diaz as Pilo
- Lito Anzures as Tata Temio
- Victor Bravo
- Max Laurel
- Vic Varrion

== Production ==
Shooting for the film was done in Paoay, Ilocos Norte.

== Release ==
Ang Panday was released at the 6th Metro Manila Film Festival on December 25, 1980.

=== Restoration ===
The film was restored by FPJ Productions in 2014.

== Accolades ==
Year	Group	Category	Name	Result
1980	Metro Manila Film Festival	Best Music	Ernani Cuenco	Won

== See also ==
- Panday (comics)
- Pandoy: Ang Alalay ng Panday
- Panday (2005 TV series)
- Ang Panday (2009 film)
- Ang Panday 2
- Ang Panday (2016 TV series)
- Ang Panday (2017 film)
- Ang Panday (song)
