= Pandoy: Ang Alalay ng Panday =

- Theatrical release poster
- Directed by: Tony Y. Reyes
- Written by: Vic Sotto; Joey de Leon; Tony Y. Reyes
- Based on: Ang Panday by Carlo J. Caparas and Steve Gan
- Produced by: Wally Chua; Victor Villegas
- Starring: Joey de Leon
- Cinematography: Sergio Lobo
- Edited by: Eduardo "Boy" Jarlego Jr.
- Music by: Mon del Rosario
- Production company: Moviestars Production
- Distributed by: Moviestars Production
- Release date: June 24, 1993
- Country: Philippines
- Languages: Filipino; Bisaya

Pandoy: Ang Alalay ng Panday (transl. Pandoy: The Blacksmith's Assistant) is a 1993 fantasy comedy film co-written and directed by Tony Y. Reyes. It stars Joey de Leon in the title role. It was one of the entries in the 1993 Manila Film Festival.

The film is streaming online on YouTube.

== Plot ==
Pandoy was chosen to fight the dark horde in the absence of Flavio, a famed Panday (transl. blacksmith). He is said to have forged a similar magic dagger turning sword from the remnants of Flavio's original meteorite gemstone metal, where host Ka- Elias showed a path to Santa Monica. During the aftermath of Flavio's last duel against Lizardo, the prince of darkness, Panday went on a warrior's pilgrimage in search of destroying the remaining relics that could resurrect Lizardo, leaving the remaining dark forces unrivaled. Flavio's journey was concealed and it was uncertain when he could return under the "Itim na Aklat" (transl. Black Book). Pandoy lives in the grand stable together with his longtime friend Kadyo. He is madly in love with Cristina, daughter of the aristocratic Lord or "Don" of the Grand stable.

== Cast ==
- Joey de Leon as Pandoy: The chosen one to forge a dagger transforming sword and to be the Panday's blacksmith's apprentice.
- Mariz Ricketts as Issa: The eldest daughter of Ka Elias.
- Sharmaine Arnaiz as Cristina: The aristocrat daughter of the master of the grand stable where Pandoy used to work as a farrier.
- Val Sotto as Niño: The aristocrat bully at the grand stable.
- Joel Torre as Redentor: The last captain of the dark horde of what was left of Lizardo's men. He wants to be powerful like Lizardo.
- Sunshine Cruz as Vibora: Redentor's trusted Lieutenant to lead the dark horde.
- Domingo Landicho as Ka Elias: The elder of Sta. Monica, keeper of the black book, and the seeker of a kind-hearted blacksmith.
- Richie D'Horsie as Kadyo: Pandoy's long-time friend and supporter, he joins Pandoy on a long journey to Santa Monica.
- Yoyong Martirez as Pendong:

== Production ==
Contrary to the belief that Pandoy is a parody of Panday, Joey de Leon clarified that it is a different character conceptualized by him, Vic Sotto and Tony Reyes, based on ideas and suggestions from the late Fernando Poe Jr. who portrayed the original character. Poe was supposedly part of the film as a guest in one scene but didn't push through due to scheduling conflicts.
