= Panday (character) =

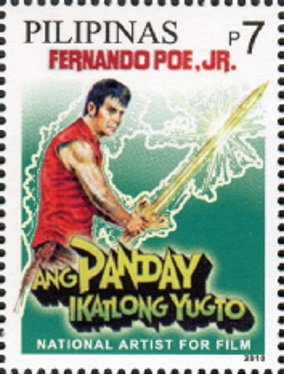
- The Panday character as depicted by Fernando Poe Jr. in the third installment of the first film series in the 1980s. This is also a 2010 postage stamp released by the Philippine Postal Corporation in honor of Poe Jr. for National Stamp Collecting Month 2010 commemorating National Artists of the Philippines

Publication information
- Publisher: Ace Publications
- First appearance: Ang Panday, Pilipino Komiks (1979) (Note: Based on other sources, Ang Panday was first published in 1976.)
- Created by: Carlo J. Caparas (writer); Steve Gan (artist)

In-story information
- Alter ego: Flavio
- Abilities: Possesses a dagger forged from a meteorite which turns magically into a sword (or any other kind of weaponry in other versions) and has superlative swordsmanship skills

The Panday (Filipino for smith) is a fictional Philippine comics character created by writer Carlo J. Caparas and artist Steve Gan. His stories were first serialized in the comic series Ang Panday ("The Smith") in Pilipino Komiks during the late 1970s. The character, whose real name is Flavio, became a Philippine pop culture icon since it was adapted to film (Ang Panday) in 1980 with Fernando Poe Jr. portraying Flavio and Max Alvarado as his archenemy Lizardo. The film spawned three direct sequels, as well as multiple other more loosely connected films and television series including an animated version.

== Publication history ==
In the 1970s, Carlo J. Caparas was thinking of a new comics adventure novel due to the wishes of his publisher Don Ramon Roces and then later he came up with a legendary folk hero named the Panday. He patterned the character to look like Fernando Poe Jr. as he instructed the artist and co-creator Steve Gan to draw the Panday's face similar to Poe's. Upon making the character, Caparas already conceived in his mind that Poe would be the Panday even before the character was still yet to be portrayed by Poe in film. The character along with its look, villains and powers also drew inspiration from Philippine history and culture.

Their creation first appeared in Pilipino Komiks in 1979 as the comic serial Ang Panday. It sold hundreds of thousands copies every week during its run in the 1980s. In the 1980s, the character was later serialized in Liwayway magazine entitled Dugo ng Panday and then as a comic strip in the People's Journal tabloid entitled Hiwaga ng Panday.

The first comic stories do not contain fantastical elements and the Panday is just an ordinary blacksmith named Flavio who fights criminals by using his sledgehammer and a branding iron, marking enemies with an "X" akin to Zorro's Z. He has no superpowers and no supernatural weapons. In the later stories, influenced by the first movie adaptation (which incorporated the Zorro-style mark in its first half), the Panday possesses a dagger that turns magically into a sword which he forged from a mystical meteorite. Caparas got the idea of the meteorite from his childhood where he and his playmates would find these kinds of rocks and break them open, revealing sparkling minerals that seem magical.

In 2005, an Ovaltine sponsored comics series was released about the character. The story of this comics was connected to the 2005 television series Panday aired at ABS-CBN and was still penned by Caparas but was drawn by Rico Rival and colored by Richard Bonzon.

== Character background ==
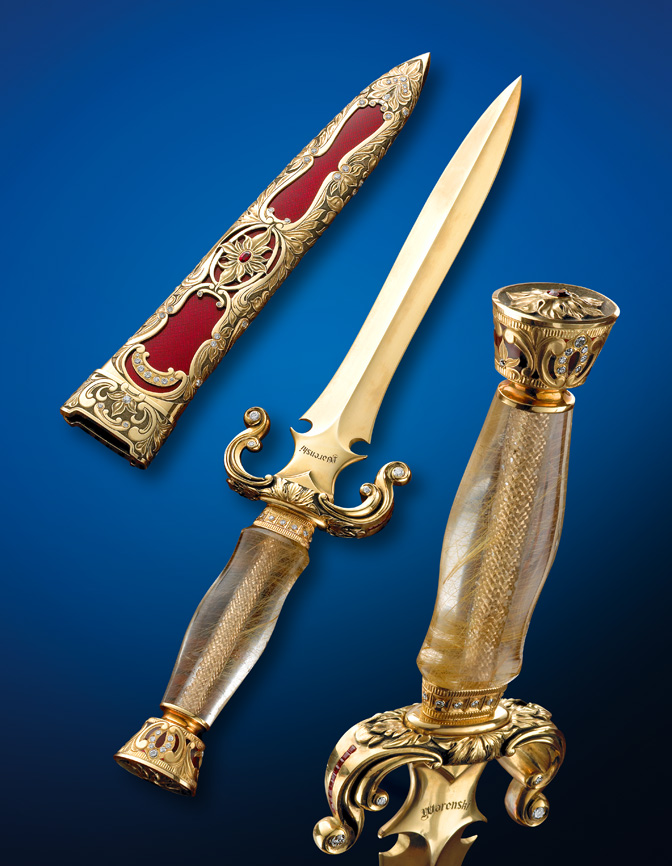
A Buster Warenski dagger that bears resemblance to Panday's balaraw

The common story line for the Panday indicates that Flavio is a noble blacksmith and then one day a meteorite falls from the sky. He forges its ore into a dagger (balaraw in Filipino), which magically turns into a sword when he raises it and points to the sky. He uses this sword to fight evil forces who are oppressing his hometown.

Flavio is just a normal human and has no special powers or skills, except for his blacksmithing and swordsmanship. He uses his magical blade that emits energy bolts to fight his supernatural enemies. The blade hums or sings when danger is near and can cut through anything without resistance. He uses a shield on occasion, which is likewise also forged from the meteorite. Flavio wears a distinctive costume, composed of a red vest, dark pants and boots.

Besides Flavio's love interest, recurring supporting characters in the franchise include a boy sidekick and an old hermit-like adviser. For example, in the first film adaptation Ang Panday, there is a boy named Lando (portrayed by Bentot Jr.) that serves as Flavio's buddy and an old man named Tata Temyong, loosely "Grandpa Artemio" (played by Lito Anzures) that serves as the Panday's adviser. The Panday's initial enemies are ordinary bandits, criminals and soldiers and then later he battles supernatural beings including witches, ghosts, flesh-eating beasts and demons. His archnemesis is Lizardo, originally an ordinary bandit leader in the first movie but later becoming a dark warlock and warlord in later movies. In the Poe movies, he also has his own singing sword.

== In other media ==
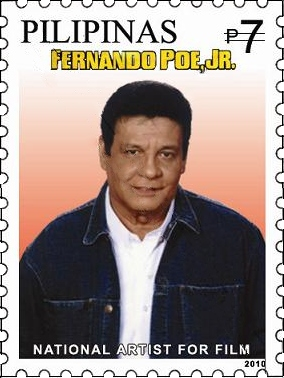
Fernando Poe Jr. featured in one of the 2010 postage stamps released in his honor. The other postage stamps feature his Panday character.

Outside the comics world, the Panday is featured in various media, most notably in film and television as well as theme songs for these medium. The character became more popular due to the portrayal of Fernando Poe Jr. in Ang Panday film series from 1980 to 1984. Poe's Panday also appeared as cameo in other films including She-Man, Mistress of the Universe and Ang Pagbabalik ni Pedro Penduko. In 2010, Panday and other characters portrayed by Poe are featured in commemorative stamps issued by Philippine Postal Office.

=== Films ===
| Film | Starring | Produced by | Directed by | Written by | Date released |
|---|---|---|---|---|---|
| Ang Panday | Fernando Poe Jr. as Flavio; Max Alvarado as Lizardo; Lito Anzures as Tata Temio; Bentot Jr. as Lando | FPJ Productions | Ronwaldo Reyes | Carlo J. Caparas; Fred Navarro | December 25, 1980 |
| Pagbabalik ng Panday | Fernando Poe Jr. as Flavio; Max Alvarado as Lizardo; Lito Anzures as Tata Temio; Bentot Jr. as Lando | FPJ Productions | Ronwaldo Reyes | Carlo J. Caparas; Tommy C. David | December 25, 1981 |
| Ang Panday: Ikatlong Yugto | Fernando Poe Jr. as Flavio; Max Alvarado as Lizardo; Lito Anzures as Tata Temio; Bentot Jr. as Lando | FPJ Productions | Ronwaldo Reyes | Carlo J. Caparas; Fred Navarro | December 25, 1982 |
| Ang Panday IV: Ika-apat na Aklat | Fernando Poe Jr. as Flavio; Max Alvarado as Lizardo; Lito Anzures as Tata Temio; Bentot Jr. as Lando | FPJ Productions | Ronwaldo Reyes | Carlo J. Caparas; Fred Navarro | December 25, 1984 |
| Dugo ng Panday | Ramon 'Bong' Revilla Jr. as Flavio; Edu Manzano as Conde; Max Alvarado as Lizardo | Regal Films | Peque Gallaga; Lore Reyes | Peque Gallaga; Lore Reyes; Don Escudero | January 4, 1993 |
| Pandoy: Ang Alalay ng Panday | Joey de Leon as Pandoy | Moviestars Production | Tony Y. Reyes | Tony Y. Reyes; Vic Sotto; Joey de Leon | June 24, 1993 |
| Hiwaga ng Panday | Jinggoy Estrada as Guiller | Golden Lions Films | Carlo J. Caparas | Carlo J. Caparas | December 25, 1998 |
| Ang Panday | Ramon 'Bong' Revilla Jr. as Flavio; Phillip Salvador as Lizardo | GMA Films; Imus Productions | Mac Alejandre | Carlo J. Caparas; R.J. Nuevas | December 25, 2009 |
| Ang Panday 2 | Ramon 'Bong' Revilla Jr. as Flavio; Phillip Salvador as Lizardo | GMA Films; Imus Productions | Mac Alejandre | Carlo J. Caparas; R.J. Nuevas | December 25, 2011 |
| Ang Panday | Coco Martin as Flavio Batungbakal III; Jake Cuenca as Lizardo | CCM Film Productions; Viva Films | Rodel Nacianceno | Rian Hernandez; Joel Mercado | December 25, 2017 |

==== 1980s ====
The Ang Panday original film series consisted of four films: Ang Panday ("The Smith", 1980), Pagbabalik ng Panday ("The Return of the Smith", 1981), Ang Panday: Ikatlong Yugto ("The Smith: The Third Act", 1982), and Ang Panday IV: Ika-Apat Na Aklat ("The Smith IV: The Fourth Book", 1984). These films all starred Fernando Poe, Jr. as the title character, Flavio and Max Alvarado as Lizardo. After four films starring Poe, other Panday films were produced continuing or rebooting the story line of the original series. The original Ang Panday 1980 film is considered to be one of the most persisting and frequently rebooted film in the action-fantasy genre in the Philippines.

==== 1990s ====
In 1993, Ramon "Bong" Revilla, Jr. headlined the film Dugo ng Panday ("Blood of the Smith") as a descendant and namesake of the original Flavio and Edu Manzano as the antagonist. The plot of the film takes place centuries after the first Flavio's death and then his descendant finds the sword because of his pure heart, and takes up his mantle as the Panday. Meanwhile, Lizardo's brain has been transplanted to an alien cyborg body (played by Manzano), while his head (still played by Alvarado) is preserved in a tank. Eventually, the new Panday destroys the cyborg and kills the head. In contrast to Poe's Flavio, this Flavio wears a brown vest. He also has to defeat the spirit of the first Panday when he claims the Panday's sword.

Also released in 1993 was Pandoy: Ang Alalay ng Panday ("Pandoy, the Smith's Lackey"), a parody of and homage to the original film series, which starred comedy actor Joey de Leon as Pandoy. In the film, the Panday is absent and a stable boy named Pandoy became the new blacksmith and he gets rid of the pirates and white slavers led by villainous Redentor (portrayed by Joel Torre) who is terrorizing his town. The film features a subplot of Pandoy having to choose between two romantic interests. He has a sidekick named Kadyo (Richie D'Horsie), who calls himself "ang alalay ng alalay ng Panday" (the lackey of the lackey).

A film in 1998 entitled Hiwaga ng Panday ("Mystery of the Smith") stars Jinggoy Estrada as Guiller, a gunsmith, and Kris Aquino as Emy, his love interest. The story starts as Flavio, the original Panday, finds the meteorite. He is shown fighting the Japanese during World War II, using his sword to deflect bullets, and survives into old age. Mortally wounded after facing a criminal gang armed with automatic rifles, he was able to kill them nevertheless and plant his magic sword into the wall of a small chapel, and only one with a clean heart and noble intentions may pull it out. In the present day, Guiller, an expert gunsmith and protector of the poor, meets Emy after both are taken hostage by criminals. Guiller becomes the new Panday after he retrieves the sword and fights a kidnap-for-ransom gang. The sword is melted and reforged into a shotgun which fires bullets and stun rays. It magically turns back to a sword when needed. Unlike all other incarnations of the Panday, Guiller wears a black jacket and jeans. He is at times aided by the spirit of Flavio, and he defeats the criminal who shot Flavio in a sword fight after the latter arose from Hell wielding the "sword of darkness", with Flavio appearing to take over his body to deal the final blow. At the end, another meteor falls and then returns to the heavens after Guiller/Flavio plants the sword into it for a final time.

==== 2000s ====
In 2009, a reboot of the series, Ang Panday was released by GMA Films as one of the entries of 2009 Metro Manila Film Festival and stars Bong Revilla, who also starred in 1993 Dugo ng Panday film as a descendant of the original Flavio but this time he played as Flavio himself. Lizardo is played by Phillip Salvador who also played Flavio in the 2005 Panday television series. Ely Buendia and his Pupil band performed the theme song of the film. In 2011, a sequel, Ang Panday 2, was also shown in theaters as an entry of 2011 Metro Manila Film Festival, with the stars reprising their roles.

==== 2010s ====
In 2017, it was announced that another Panday film was in the works with Coco Martin set to direct and star as Flavio after Caparas approved the film. The film marked Martin's directorial debut. The film (entitled also as Ang Panday) was eventually shown during the 2017 Metro Manila Film Festival. The theme song entitled "Ang Panday" is performed by Gloc-9 and Ebe Dancel. The evil Lizardo is played by Jake Cuenca in this film. As with the previous Panday iterations, Flavio in this film is a descendant of the original Panday.

=== Television series ===
==== 1986 animated TV series ====
In 1986, RPN aired its first ever Filipino animated television series, Ang Panday based on Poe's character. The animated series, the first television adaptation of the Panday character, was created by Geirry Garccia with Poe reprising his role as the voice of the Panday. Garccia was honored for his animated works including the Ang Panday television series.

==== 2005 TV series ====
In 2005, ABS-CBN aired a live-action Panday television series. It features a young new Panday named Tristan, played by Jericho Rosales, Heart Evangelista as Eden, his love interest, and Victor Neri as Lizardo. Philip Salvador plays a version of Poe's character who appears in the introductory episodes. In this version Flavio defeated Lizardo. However, Lizardo's brain is still alive, and Tristan, a man from the present time, becomes the Panday in Flavio's stead, as Flavio ascended to Heaven. The theme song entitled "Makita Kang Muli" (To See You Again) is performed by Sugarfree and it is included on their second album. According to Spot.PH, this series is one of best fantasy series in Philippine television.

==== Spin-off TV series ====
In 2010, after the film Ang Panday that starred Bong Revilla as Flavio was released, GMA Network aired its spin-off, Panday Kids. It is a re-imagining of the Panday franchise of Carlo J. Caparas as well as a homage to Poe's film character. The series is about the three young descendants prophesied to combat evil and preserve the Panday spirit by protecting the legendary sword. It stars Robert Villar, Sabrina Man and Julian Marcus Trono as the Panday kids. Marvin Agustin played the main nemesis of Flavio, Lizardo, who previously played by Philip Salvador from the Ang Panday reboot film. Iza Calzado, who is from the previous film, reprised her role as Maria Makiling. The theme song of the series is performed by Parokya ni Edgar.

==== 2016 TV series ====
In 2016, TV5 aired its first TV series remake of the series, Ang Panday starring Richard Gutierrez as Flavio and his descendants Miguel and Juro. The series was co-produced by Viva Television with TV5. Caparas was heavily involved in this project and he said that the series features three parts: a prequel, the story about Flavio and his journey to becoming the Panday, then moving to Miguel in the Spanish colonial period, and then Juro in the present day, as one then the other takes up his mantle as the Panday. In the final arc, Flavio and Miguel are transported to the present day to aid Juro. In this version, Flavio is a foundling and was raised by a priest. He also has a brother who was raised by bad elements. Christopher de Leon portrayed the antagonist Lizardo.

== See also ==
- Carlo J. Caparas's other works
  - Kamandag
  - Totoy Bato
- Fernando Poe Jr.
- List of Filipino superheroes
  - Darna
  - Zuma
