= 1980 Metro Manila Film Festival =

6th edition of Philippine festival

- Date: December 25, 1980 to January 3, 1981
- Site: Manila

Highlights
- Best Picture: Taga sa Panahon
- Most awards: Brutal, Kung Ako'y Iiwan Mo, Langis at Tubig and Taga sa Panahon (2)

The 6th Metro Manila Film Festival was held in 1980.

Fernando Poe, Jr. had his first Panday film, the undisputed top grosser of the festival; Nora Aunor had two entries: Lino Brocka's Bona and Laurice Guillen's Kung Ako'y Iiwan Mo; Vilma Santos came up with Danny Zialcita's Langis at Tubig; Amy Austria in Marilou Diaz-Abaya's Brutal. Other entries were Basag with Alma Moreno, Taga sa Panahon with Christopher de Leon and Bembol Roco, and three comedy films: Tembong with Niño Muhlach, Kape't Gatas with Chiquito and Julie Vega, and Dang-Dong with Andrea Bautista (daughter of Ramon Revilla, Sr.).

The Festival's Best Picture award was won by Premiere Productions' Taga sa Panahon. The awards were spread equally and the category for Best Child Performer was introduced that year, the first awardee being Julie Vega.

== Entries ==
Title	Starring	Studio	Director	Genre
Basag	Mat Ranillo III, Vivian Velez, Alma Moreno	Showbiz	Van Ludor	Drama
Bona	Nora Aunor, Phillip Salvador	NV Productions	Lino Brocka	Drama
Brutal	Amy Austria, Gina Alajar, Jay Ilagan	Bancom Audiovision	Marilou Diaz-Abaya	Drama
Dang-Dong	Susan Valdez, Eddie Garcia, George Estregan, Andrea Bautista	Imus Productions	Efren Pinon	Comedy, Family
Kape't Gatas	Chiquito, Julie Vega	Larry Santiago Productions	Ric Santiago	Comedy
Kung Ako'y Iiwan Mo	Nora Aunor, Christopher de Leon, Rollie Quizon	Lea Productions	Laurice Guillen	Drama
Langis at Tubig	Vilma Santos, Dindo Fernando, Amy Austria	Sining Silangan	Danny L. Zialcita	Drama, Romance
Ang Panday	Fernando Poe, Jr., Liz Alindogan, Paquito Diaz, Max Alvarado, Lito Anzures, Bentot, Jr.	FPJ Productions	Ronwaldo Reyes	Action, Fantasy
Taga sa Panahon	Christopher de Leon, Bembol Roco, Chanda Romero, Cherie Gil, Suzette Ranillo, Michael de Mesa	Premiere Productions	Augusto Buenaventura	Drama
Tembong	Niño Muhlach, Ricky Belmonte, Boots Anson-Roa, Azenth Briones, Eddie Garcia	D'Wonder Films	J. Erastheo Navoa	Comedy

== Winners and nominees ==
=== Awards ===
Winners are listed first, highlighted with boldface and indicated with a double dagger (‡). Nominees are also listed if applicable.

Best Film	Best Director
**Taga sa Panahon**‡; Brutal; Langis at Tubig	**Marilou Diaz-Abaya – Brutal**‡
Best Actor	Best Actress
**Dindo Fernando – Langis at Tubig**‡	**Amy Austria – Brutal**‡
Best Sound Engineering	Best Cinematography
**Rudy Baldovino and Ben Pelayo – Kung Ako'y Iiwan Mo**‡	**Rudy Lacap – Kung Ako'y Iiwan Mo**‡
Best Music	Best Story
**Ernani Cuenco – Ang Panday**‡	**Danny L. Zialcita – Jose N. Carreon**‡
Best Screenplay	Best Child Performer
**Jose N. Carreon – Taga sa Panahon**‡	**Julie Vega – Kape't Gatas**‡

== Multiple awards ==
Awards	Film
2	Taga sa Panahon
2	Langis at Tubig
2	Brutal
2	Kung Ako'y Iiwan Mo

== Commentary ==
=== Second Golden Age of Philippine film ===
The period of the Philippine film's artistic accomplishment begins in 1975 (three years after the dictator Ferdinand Marcos' declaration of Martial Law) and ending in the February 1986 People Power Revolution where the dictator Marcos lost his power. Nora Aunor's Bona and Himala in 1980 and 1982 respectively (both official entries of MMFF) achieves to represent the period where the accomplishments of two government institutions contributed to the emergence of New Cinema in the 1970s and 1980s. Her films are cinematically accomplished despite being politically engaged films, and the MMFF is able to make these films flourish during this period.

Preceded by 1979 Metro Manila Film Festival	Metro Manila Film Festival; 1980	Succeeded by 1981 Metro Manila Film Festival
