= Panday (2005 TV series) =

- Promotional poster
- Also known as: Carlo J. Caparas' Panday
- Genre: Fantaserye; Drama; Action
- Created by: ABS-CBN Studios
- Based on: Ang Panday by Carlo J. Caparas and Steve Gan
- Written by: Galo Ador; Aloysius Adlawan; Tristan Gaynor; Angelo Roxas; Danica Domingo
- Directed by: Toto Natividad
- Starring: Jericho Rosales; Heart Evangelista
- Theme music composer: Jimmy Antiporda and Cymbee Antiporda
- Ending theme: "Makita Kang Muli" by Sugarfree
- Composer: Jesse Lucas
- Country of origin: Philippines
- Original language: Tagalog
- No. of seasons: 2
- No. of episodes: 65

Production
- Executive producer: Grace Ann Casimsiman
- Editors: Roy Francia; Rommel Malimban; Jesus Mendoza Jr. Dennis A. Salgado
- Running time: 40 minutes
- Production companies: FPJ Productions; Star Creatives

Original release
- Network: ABS-CBN
- Release: November 7, 2005 – May 26, 2006

Related
- Ang Panday (2016 TV series)

Carlo J. Caparas' Panday or simply Panday (transl. blacksmith) is a Philippine television drama fantasy series broadcast by ABS-CBN. Based on the fictional comics character of the same title, created by Carlo J. Caparas and illustrated by Steve Gan. Directed by Toto Natividad, it stars Jericho Rosales and Heart Evangelista. It aired on the network's Primetime Bida line up and worldwide on TFC from November 7, 2005 to May 26, 2006, replacing Ikaw ang Lahat sa Akin and was replaced by Calla Lily.

== Background ==
Panday literally means "the blacksmith". Ang Panday is the TV adaptation of the Fernando Poe Jr. film series Ang Panday from the early 1980s. It is about a blacksmith who made an enchanted sword that gives him special powers to battle the dark forces.

Some of the location shots were taken in a remote town in Bohol, where the beach is white. Locals called it "colgate-white".

== Plot ==
A meteor crashes into the desert of Sto. Sepulcro. The town blacksmith, Flavio, forges a dagger and a churchbell from the remains of the meteor. He uses the dagger to fight off the evil Sombra Oscura, who constantly attacks the town. By some mystical power, the dagger transforms into a great sword every time Flavio wields it.

In his final battle against evil, the Panday faces off against Lizardo, the son of Rodgin and the leader of the Sombras. The battle is intense, but Flavio prevails in the end, vanquishing Lizardo.

Having saved Sto. Sepulcro, Flavio decides to give up his sword. He goes to the church and casts his fabled weapon into the bell he also made. A white light then shoots out from the sky, and it lifts up Panday into the heavens.

The people of Sto. Sepulcro rejoice now that Panday has brought them peace. Unbeknownst to them, the Sombras discover that there is a part of Lizardo that is still alive — his brain.

To bring him back to life, they must transcend time and space to look for the girl who can resurrect their master. In that time, Tristan, (played by Jericho Rosales) as the town's blacksmith, forges another sword with the same Flavio created.

== Cast and characters ==
=== Main cast ===
- Jericho Rosales as Tristan/Panday
- Heart Evangelista as Eden/Camia

=== Supporting cast ===
- Victor Neri as Lizardo
- Nante Montreal as Tata Selo
- Julio Pacheco as Utoy

=== Unang Yugto characters ===
==== World 1 ====
- Phillip Salvador as Flavio/Panday
- Rommel Montano as Sukor
- Marianne dela Riva as Esmeralda
- Nante Montreal as Tata Selo
- Roldan Aquino as Mang Emong
- Chris Vertido as Padre Damian
- Shyr Valdez as Lolita
- Micheal Rivero as Diego
- Ian de Leon as Domingo
- Christopher Roxas as Julio
- Neri Naig as Florentina
- Eva Darren as Nana Selo
- Bea Nicolas as Henia
- Joe Gruta as Misteryosong Matanda
- Joshua Dionisio as Boyet
- Mico Palanca as Alfred
- Mike Austria as Mr. Roxas
- Vivian Foz as Mrs. Roxas
- Michaela Espinosa as Danica

=== Ikalawang Yugto characters ===
==== World 2 ====
- Derek Ramsay as Kahimu
- Monsour del Rosario as Kaupay
- Levi Ignacio as Kahuyo
- Dan Fernandez as Kabuog
- Apreal Tolentino as Suruguon
- Jeni Hernandez as Madalagan
- Ashley Silverio as Mabaysay
- Vanessa Gomez as Masayawon
- Maricar Fernandez as Makantahon
- Diana Dayao as Matawahon

==== World 3 ====
- Kristine Hermosa as Camia
- Paw Diaz as Dahlia
- Anna Larrucea as Magnolia
- Tanya Gomez as Violeta (past)
- Erich Gonzales as Violeta (present)
- Rafael Rosell as Calyptus
- Eric Fructuoso as Gumma
- Ketchup Eusebio as Orkido

=== Unang Yugto villains ===
==== World 1 ====
- Rommel Montano as Socur
- Mon Confiado as Magnus
- Levi Ignacio as Feirrus
- Paul Guzman as Rusticus
- Aleck Bovick as Lady Feirrus

=== Ikalawang Yugto villains ===
==== World 2 ====
- Dimples Romana as Manaram
- Michelle Bayle as Andam

==== World 3 ====
- Victor Neri as Jiamondo
- Carlos Agassi as Jaffir
- Jeremiah Rosales as Emer
- Bernard Palanca as Kamatayan

== Production ==
=== Casting ===
In June 2005, Heart Evangelista was cast as Eden, the love interest of Tristan, after a two-month-long auditioning process was conducted by ABS-CBN.

== Reception ==
According to AGB Nielsen, the pilot episode of Ang Panday gained an impressive of 44.7% national ratings, winning against its rival Encantadia.

== See also ==
- Fantaserye and telefantasya
- List of programs broadcast by ABS-CBN
- List of ABS-CBN Studios original drama series
- Ang Panday (2016 TV series)
- Ang Panday (2017 film)
