= Pagbabalik ng Panday =

1981 film directed by Ronwaldo Reyes

- Theatrical poster
- Directed by: Ronwaldo Reyes
- Screenplay by: Tommy C. David
- Story by: Carlo J. Caparas
- Based on: Ang Panday by Carlo J. Caparas and Steve Gan
- Produced by: FPJ
- Starring: Fernando Poe Jr.; Tina Revilla
- Cinematography: Ver Reyes
- Edited by: Augusto Salvador
- Music by: Ernani Cuenco
- Color process: Eastmancolor
- Production company: FPJ Productions
- Release date: December 25, 1981 (MMFF)
- Running time: 117 minutes
- Country: Philippines
- Language: Filipino

Pagbabalik ng Panday (lit. 'Return of the Blacksmith') is a 1981 Filipino fantasy film produced and directed by Fernando Poe Jr., based on the Pilipino Komiks character Panday. It is the sequel to the 1980 film Ang Panday and stars Poe as the titular character, alongside Tina Revilla, Max Alvarado, Bentot Jr., Rosemarie Gil, Lito Anzures, Lilian Laing, and Sarah Cariño.

Produced by FPJ Productions, the film was theatrically released on December 25, 1981 as an official entry of the 7th Metro Manila Film Festival. Ang Panday: Ikatlong Yugto followed in 1982.

== Synopsis ==
The blacksmith Flavio returns to take down his enemy Lizardo, who has come back from the dead to wreak havoc throughout the land.

As Flavio and his allies, Tata Temyong and Lando set off on a journey to hunt him down, they encounter dark creatures and Bruhilda, the sorceress who resurrected Lizardo and endowed him with powers that even Flavio's legendary sword will not be able to match.

== Cast ==
- Fernando Poe Jr. as Flavio / Panday
- Tina Revilla
- Max Alvarado as Lizardo
- Bentot Jr. as Lando
- Rosemarie Gil as Bruhilda
- Lito Anzures as Tata Temyong
- Jose Romulo
- Lilian Laing
- Sarah Cariño
- Michael Pigar
- Eddie Gicoso
- Mary Ann Galapin
- Amy Anzures
- Clint de Castro
- Ernie David
- Efren Belardo
- Buddy Dator

== Accolades ==
Year	Group	Category	Name	Result
1981	Metro Manila Film Festival	Best Child Performer	Bentot Jr.	Won
1981	Metro Manila Film Festival	Best Cinematography	Ver Reyes	Won
1982	FAMAS Awards	Best Supporting Actor	Lito Anzures	Nominated
1982	FAMAS Awards	Best Child Actor	Bentot Jr.	Nominated
1982	FAMAS Awards	Best Cinematography	Ver Reyes	Won
1982	FAMAS Awards	Best Production Design	Rolando Sacristio	Won
1982	FAMAS Awards	Best Sound	Cesar Lucas	Won
