= Ang Panday (2016 TV series) =

- Title card
- Also known as: Carlo J. Caparas's Ang Panday
- Genre: Action; Drama; Fantasy; Horror; Science fiction
- Created by: Viva Communications
- Based on: Ang Panday by Carlo J. Caparas and Steve Gan
- Developed by: Veronique del Rosario-Corpuz; Jay Montelibano
- Written by: Ma. Amor Olaguer (head); Milo Alto Paz
- Directed by: Mac C. Alejandre
- Starring: Richard Gutierrez; Jasmine Curtis-Smith; Bangs Garcia; Sam Pinto
- Opening theme: "Ang Panday" by Rico Blanco feat. Shehyee
- Composer: Von de Guzman
- Country of origin: Philippines
- Original languages: Tagalog; English
- No. of episodes: 42

Production
- Executive producer: Jhanice Gayl Casallo-Damaso
- Production locations: Quezon City, Philippines
- Camera setup: Multiple-Camera Setup
- Running time: 30-45 minutes
- Production companies: Viva Television; Gutz Productions

Original release
- Network: TV5
- Release: February 29 – June 2, 2016

Related
- Carlo J. Caparas' Panday (2005)

Carlo J. Caparas' Ang Panday, or simply Ang Panday, is a 2016 Philippine television drama fantasy series broadcast by TV5. Based on the fictional comics character of the same title, created by Carlo J. Caparas and illustrated by Steve Gan. Directed by Mac C. Alejandre, it stars Richard Gutierrez, Jasmine Curtis-Smith, Bangs Garcia and Sam Pinto. It aired on the network's evening line up and worldwide on Kapatid TV5 from February 29 to June 2, 2016, replacing Movie Max 5 and was replaced by Smallville. The series received low viewership due to its continuously shifting timeslot, and after its conclusion, the creative partnership between Viva Communications and TV5 ended in June 2016.

== Cast ==
=== Main cast ===
- Richard Gutierrez as Flavio/Miguel/Juro/Panday
- Jasmine Curtis-Smith as Alex
- Bangs Garcia as Ida/Venus Virus
- Sam Pinto as Steph F. Yambao
- Christopher de Leon as Lizardo

=== Supporting cast ===
- Alonzo Muhlach as Alfonso
- Carlos Agassi as Ador/Berdugo
- Jack Reid as Mark
- Ella Cruz as Phoebe
- Ranz Kyle as Joseph
- Ara Mina as Carmen
- John Regala as David
- Epy Quizon as Ledge
- Empoy Marquez as Kadyo
- Regine Tolentino as Inang Morgana
  - Lilia Cuntapay as old Morgana
- Bodjie Pascua as Apo Simeon
- Andrew Muhlach as Teenage Damian
- Fabio Ide as Adult Damian
- Menggie Cobarrubias as Old Damian

=== Extended cast and special participation ===
- Oliver Posadas as Benjie
- Tony Mabesa as Padre Lucas
- Elvis Gutierrez as Hugo
- Rocky Gutierrez as Ramon
- Cindy Miranda as Sylvia
- CJ Caparas as Anton
- Ali Peek as Phantom
- Mon Confiado as Amang
- Francine Prieto as Rosanna F. Yambao
- Raquel Montesa as Tiya Flor
- Jericka Martelle as Michelle

== Production ==
Scenes from the series were shot in Kalayaan, Laguna.

== Reception ==
According to AGB Neilsen, the pilot episode gained 5% national ratings, becoming the most watched show on TV5 Network. The series performed poorly in the ratings afterwards due to a shifting timeslot caused by the network prioritizing the live broadcast of PBA games.

== See also ==
- List of TV5 (Philippine TV network) original programming
- Panday (character)
