= 1982 FAMAS Awards =

31st edition of Filipino movie awards

31st FAMAS Awards
- Date: 1982
- Site: Philippines
- Hosted by: Bert "Tawa" Marcelo and Coney Reyes; Helen Vela (anchorwoman)

Highlights
- Best Picture: Kumander Alibasbas
- Most awards: Kumander Alibasbas; Pakawalan Mo Ako; Pagbabalik ng Panday (3 wins)

The 31st Filipino Academy of Movie Arts and Sciences Awards Night was held in 1982 in the Philippines. The event recognized outstanding achievements of the different films for the year 1981.

This is the first year in FAMAS history that three films won most of the awards. Kumander Alibasbas of JE Productions won the FAMAS Award for Best Picture including the fifth best actor award for Joseph Estrada. Pakawalan Mo Ako won the Best Actress award for Vilma Santos, and FPJ Productions' Pagbabalik ng Panday won most of the technical awards. Each of the films won three awards.

== Awards ==
=== Major awards ===
Winners are listed first and highlighted with boldface.

Best Picture	Best Director
**Kumander Alibasbas — JE Productions**; Bakit Bughaw ang Langit — Four Seasons Films International; Pakawalan Mo Ako — MVP Pictures; Salome — Bancom Audiovision	**Augusto Buenaventura — Kumander Alibasbas**; Mario O'Hara — Bakit Bughaw ang Langit; Eddie Rodriguez — Init o Lamig; Elwood Perez — Pakawalan Mo Ako; Laurice Guillen — Salome
Best Actor	Best Actress
**Joseph Estrada — Kumander Alibasbas as Cesario "Kumander Alibasbas" Manalang**; Fernando Poe Jr. — Ang Maestro as Hernan de Zuñiga; Anthony Alonzo — Hulihin si Pepeng Magtanggol as Pepeng Magtanggol; Vic Silayan — Kisapmata as Tatong Dadong Carandang; Christopher de Leon — Pakawalan Mo Ako as Freddie; Rudy Fernandez — Pepeng Shotgun; Dolphy — Titser's Pet	**Vilma Santos — Pakawalan Mo Ako as Anna**; Nora Aunor — Bakit Bughaw ang Langit; Vivian Velez — Ang Babaing Hinugot sa Aking Tadyang; Alma Moreno — I Confess; Charo Santos-Concio — Kontrobersyal as Mers Madsen; Perla Bautista — Kumander Alibasbas; Gina Alajar — Salome
Best Supporting Actor	Best Supporting Actress
**Tommy Abuel — Karma as Alfredo**; Ting Jocson — Highschool Scandal; Jay Ilagan — Kisapmata as Noel Manalansan; Angelo Castro Jr. — Kumander Alibasbas; Romy Diaz — Ang Maestro as Ignacio Dela Vega; Lito Anzures — Pagbabalik ng Panday as Tata Temio; Anthony Castelo — Pakawalan Mo Ako	**Chanda Romero — Karma as Cristy**; Anita Linda — Bakit Bughaw ang Langit as Sofia; Odette Khan — Kahit Ako'y Lupa; Charito Solis — Kisapmata as Dely Carandang; Rosemarie Gil — Dear Heart; Deborah Sun — Pakawalan Mo Ako; Armida Siguion-Reyna — Salome
Best Child Actor	Best Child Actress
**Mark Versoza — I Confess**; Jerry Jones — Kahit Ako'y Lupa; Dranreb Belleza — Kapitan Kidlat; Bentot Jr. — Pagbabalik ng Panday as Lando; Bongchi Miraflor — Salome	**Sheryl Cruz — Mga Basang Sisiw**; Julie Vega — Mga Basang Sisiw; Andrea Bautista — Tropang Bulilit; Janice de Belen — Tropang Bulilit as Flor; Lea Salonga — Tropang Bulilit as Lisa
Best in Screenplay	Best Story
**Haydee Castillo — Hiwalay**	**Baby Nebrida — Init o Lamig**
Best Sound	Best Musical Score
**Cesar Lucas — Pagbabalik ng Panday**	**Lutgardo Labad — Pakawalan Mo Ako**
Best Cinematography	Best Editing
**Ver Reyes — Pagbabalik ng Panday**	**Edgardo Vinarao — Init o Lamig**
Best Theme Song	Production Design
**Louie Ocampo — Pakawalan Mo Ako**	**Rolando Sacristia — Pagbabalik ng Panday**

=== Special Awardee ===
- **Dr. Ciriaco Santiago Memorial Award**
  - Lily Monteverde
- **Dr. Jose Perez Memorial Award**
  - **German Moreno**
- **Gregorio Valdez Memorial Award**
  - **Marichu Perez-Maceda**
- **Hall of Fame Award**
  - **Angel Avellana ~ Sound Recording**

== Presenters and performers ==
=== Presenters ===
Name(s)	Role
Imee Marcos	Gave a speech as guest of honor

=== Performers ===
Name(s)	Role	Performed
Rico J. Puno	Performer	
Sharon Cuneta	Performer	
Ivy Violan	Performer	
Something Special	Performer	
Lirio Vital	Performer	
