= Dugo ng Panday =

1993 Filipino film starring Ramon 'Bong' Revilla Jr.

- Directed by: Peque Gallaga; Lore Reyes
- Screenplay by: Jerry Lopez Sineneng
- Story by: Peque Gallaga; Lore Reyes; Don Escudero; Jerry Lopez Sineneng
- Based on: Ang Panday by Carlo J. Caparas and Steve Gan
- Produced by: Madeleine Gallaga
- Starring: Ramon 'Bong' Revilla Jr.
- Cinematography: Joe Tutanes
- Edited by: Danny Gloria
- Music by: Archie L. Castillo
- Production company: Regal Films
- Distributed by: Regal Home Video
- Release date: January 4, 1993
- Running time: 120 minutes
- Country: Philippines
- Language: Filipino

Dugo ng Panday (lit. 'Blood of the Blacksmith') is a 1993 Filipino fantasy adventure film directed by Peque Gallaga and Lore Reyes. Based on the Pilipino Komiks character Panday, it is a spin-off and sequel to the original four Panday films starring Fernando Poe Jr. The film stars Ramon 'Bong' Revilla Jr., Edu Manzano, Leo Martinez, Max Alvarado, IC Mendoza, and Aiko Melendez. Produced by Regal Films, Dugo ng Panday was released in early January 1993.

== Cast ==
- Ramon 'Bong' Revilla Jr. as Flavio/Panday, a poor young descendant of the blacksmith with the same name (played by Fernando Poe Jr. in previous films)
- Edu Manzano as Conde
- Leo Martinez as Agno
- Max Alvarado as Lizardo
- IC Mendoza as Manrico
- Aiko Melendez as Luna
- Jaime Fabregas as the Gobernador
- Max Laurel as Marag
- Ram Mojica as Macaw
- King Gutierrez as Nauhan
- Edwin Reyes as Naga
- Rey Solo as Magor
- Romy Romulo as Conde's Lieutenant
- Bien Garcia as Olan
- Ramon Confiado as Jamal
- Edison Magno as Dagim
- Toto Perez as Bahaw
- Jinky Laurel as Evil Duenna
- Fame De Los Santos as Good Duenna
- Bella Flores as Bantay
- Koko Trinidad as a scientist
- Peque Gallaga as a scientist
- Don Escudero as a scientist
- Dido de la Paz as a scientist

== Production ==
Dugo ng Panday is Bong Revilla's first film under Regal Films.

== Home media ==
On July 12, 2020, Regal Entertainment streamed the entirety of Dugo ng Panday free of charge through YouTube for a limited time.
