= Ang Panday (2017 film) =

2017 fantasy action film by Rodel Nacianceno

Carlo J. Caparas' Ang Panday
- Theatrical poster
- Directed by: Rodel Nacianceno (Note: The film was directed by Coco Martin. His director role is credited under his real name "Rodel Nacianceno" rather than his screen name. His acting role however is credited under his screen name.)
- Screenplay by: Joel Mercado; Rodel Nacianceno; Rian Hernandez
- Story by: Rodel Nacianceno
- Based on: Panday by Carlo J. Caparas and Steve Gan
- Produced by: Rodel Nacianceno; Charo Santos-Concio; Malou N. Santos; Vic Del Rosario Jr.
- Starring: Coco Martin
- Cinematography: Odie Flores
- Edited by: Renewin Alano
- Production companies: ABS-CBN Film Productions; CCM Film Productions; Viva Films
- Distributed by: Star Cinema
- Release date: December 25, 2017
- Running time: 128 minutes
- Country: Philippines
- Language: Filipino
- Budget: ₱140 million
- Box office: ₱204 million (Official 2017 MMFF run); ₱379 million (Official Domestic Run)

Carlo J. Caparas' Ang Panday (lit. 'The Blacksmith') is a 2017 Filipino superhero fantasy action film based on the eponymous comic book character created by Carlo J. Caparas and co-creator Steve Gan. Serving as the seventh installment of the Panday series, the film is co-written, directed and produced by Coco Martin, who also stars in the title role.

The film serves as an official entry to the 2017 Metro Manila Film Festival, and marks Martin's directorial debut under his real name, Rodel Nacianceno. The film received mixed to positive reviews, but it was a box office success along with Gandarrapiddo: The Revenger Squad. It was the first and only time that two co-productions between Star Cinema and Viva Films movies were released during the MMFF at the same time.

== Plot ==
In the province, Flavio II and his wife Carmen take care of their newborn baby boy, whom they dream of becoming the next heroic legend. They offer the pious Rosa Batungbakal to take care of him, but the malevolent Lizardo's unlatched spirit and his goons attack the unprotected house. Rosa takes the newborn to a church to offer guidance from a priest while Flavio fends off the goons. Flavio gets stabbed and dies after fighting the spirit, who vows to rule the world.

The baby grows up to be Flavio Batungbakal III, a gangster who ambushes bandits around a market in Tondo, only to get apprehended by the police. Flavio is released from prison, and his stepfather Andoy warns him not to cause havoc around the streets anymore. He lives a comfortable life along with his family and regularly meets with Maria, a beautiful woman with whom he admits being smitten, although her parents disapprove of him. Meanwhile, a new human form of Lizardo appears in the shadows alongside his father. He is strongly attracted to Maria and craves to be with her. A beauty contest competition nearby is under way, which goes awry.

Citizens are turned into aswangs by a reincarnated Lizardo, who secretly devises a plot to take over the country under the guise of a businessman. During one attack, an aswang disguised as a dog bites one of Flavio's younger brother, Diego, who insists that the injury is minor. While walking, Flavio is followed by an old man holding a magical book which contains a mysterious power. When the old man tells him about the real existence of the aswangs, he threatens him by pulling out his butterfly knife out of disbelief. An aswang suddenly appears, which the two men defeat. The old man realizes that Flavio is the only known person of his bloodline capable of stopping Lizardo and his army.

Flavio is handed a map and starts his quest by riding a bus to search for a mythical dagger that would help him fight the aswangs. While embarking through the forest, its surroundings suddenly changes into a magical kingdom. He encounters several dwarves, whom he asks about the location of the dagger. After seeing a diwata, which brings him to the Kingdom of Light ruled by the Engkantos, Flavio asks the king and queen where the dagger is. He challenges a skilled swordsman, whom he defeats, and retrieves the dagger in a cave. He summons the dagger upwards, creating a shockwave which turns it into a double-edged sword, the sword of his grandfather, the original Panday.

He returns to Tondo and wields his grandfather's sword to defeat most of the aswangs in the community. Diego's injury worsens and he later turns into a reluctant aswang who sacrifices himself rather than harm anyone else. Distressed from his brother's death, Flavio continues fighting the aswangs but is fatally stabbed by Lizardo. He falls into a coma, but is revived and healed by the old man. He embarks into the mountains and is informed that he is not ready to fight Lizardo unless he undergoes a training and forges his sword. Afterwards, he is summoned into a desert world where he fights numerous goons. The voice of darkness enhances Lizardo's power to ensure he would win. As the voice of darkness disappears, Flavio battles Lizardo in a sword fight, which he wins after stabbing Lizardo in his weak spot to death.

Flavio visits the church with his family and Maria to commemorate their victory against Lizardo. He vows to continue saving the world from further malevolent threats.

== Cast ==
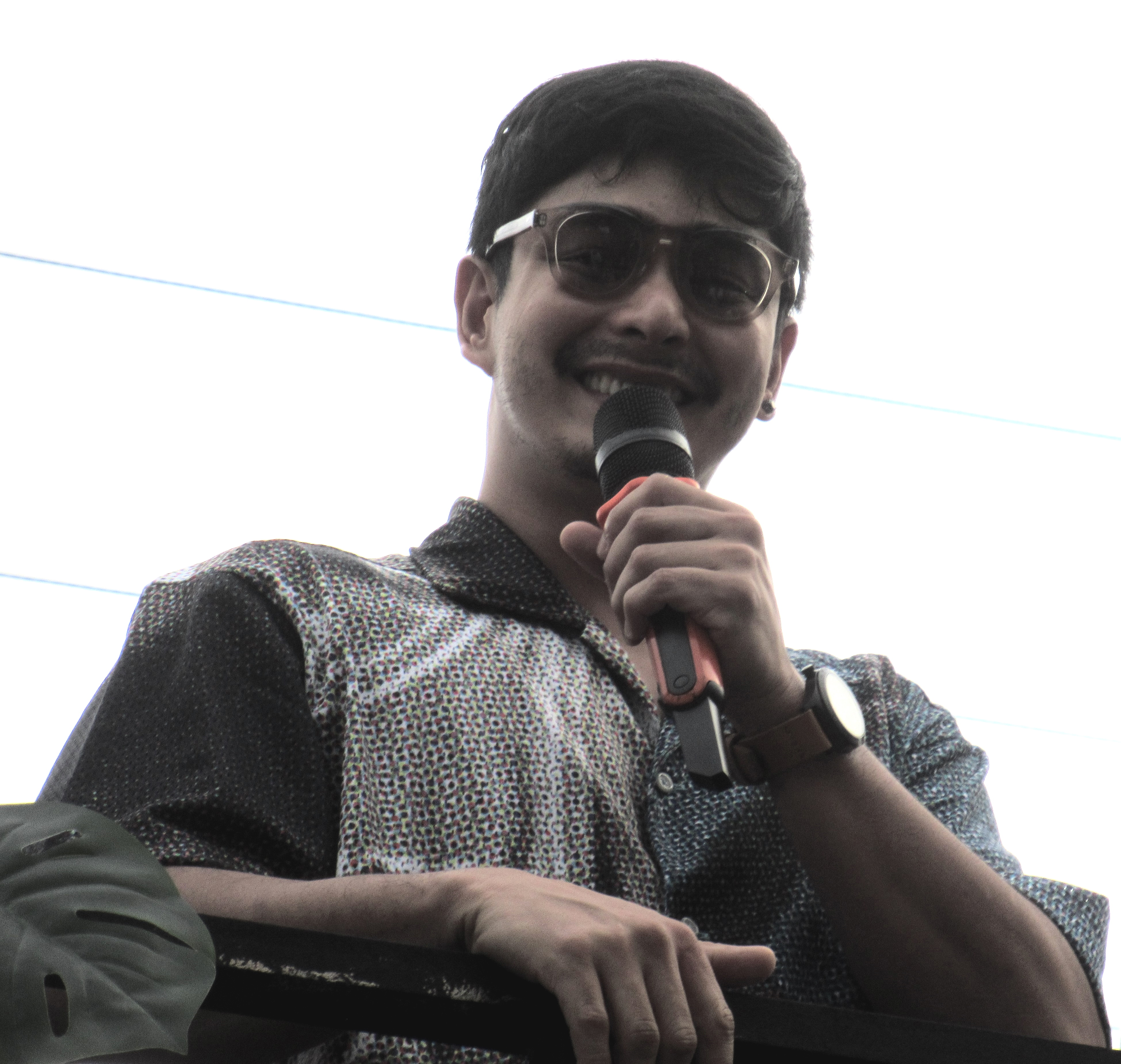
Coco Martin portrays Flavio III.

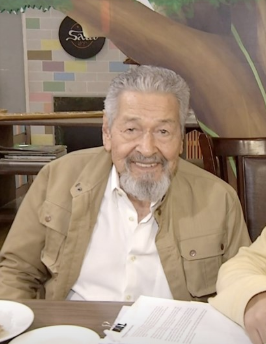
Eddie Garcia portrays Lucifer

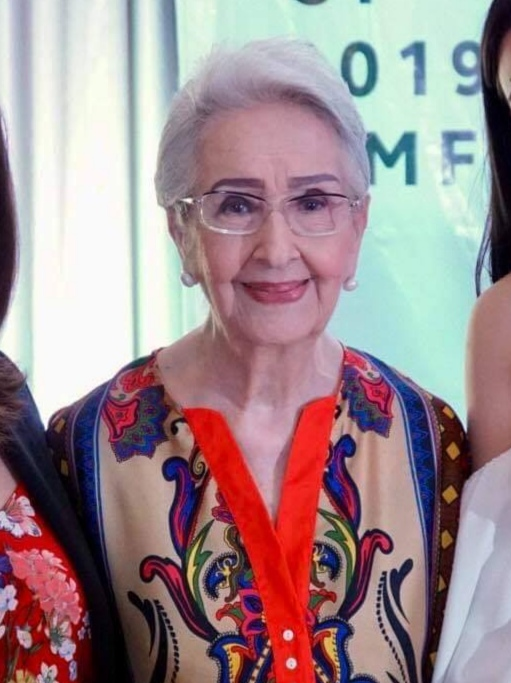
Gloria Romero as Rosa Batungbakal

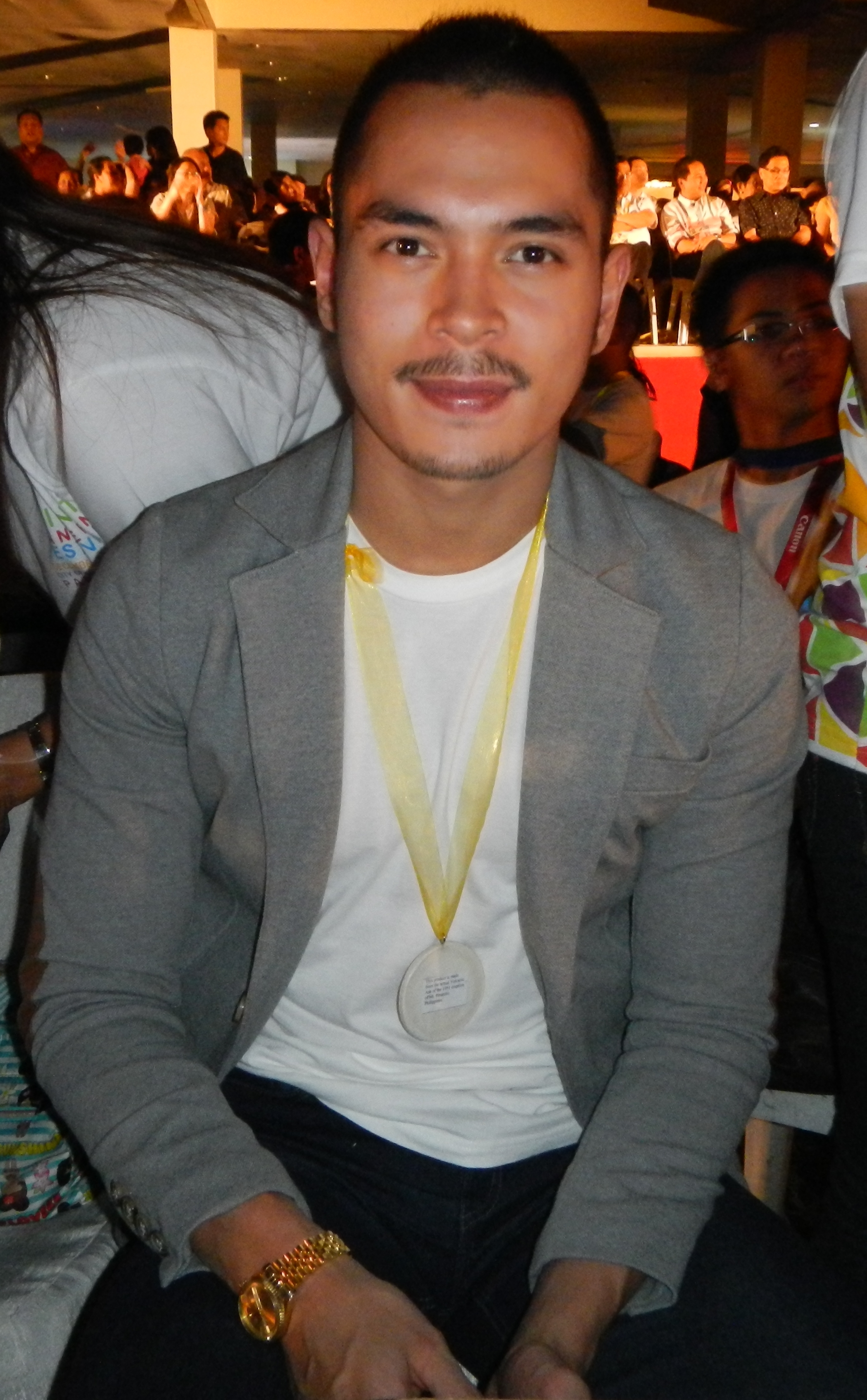
Jake Cuenca portrays Lizardo

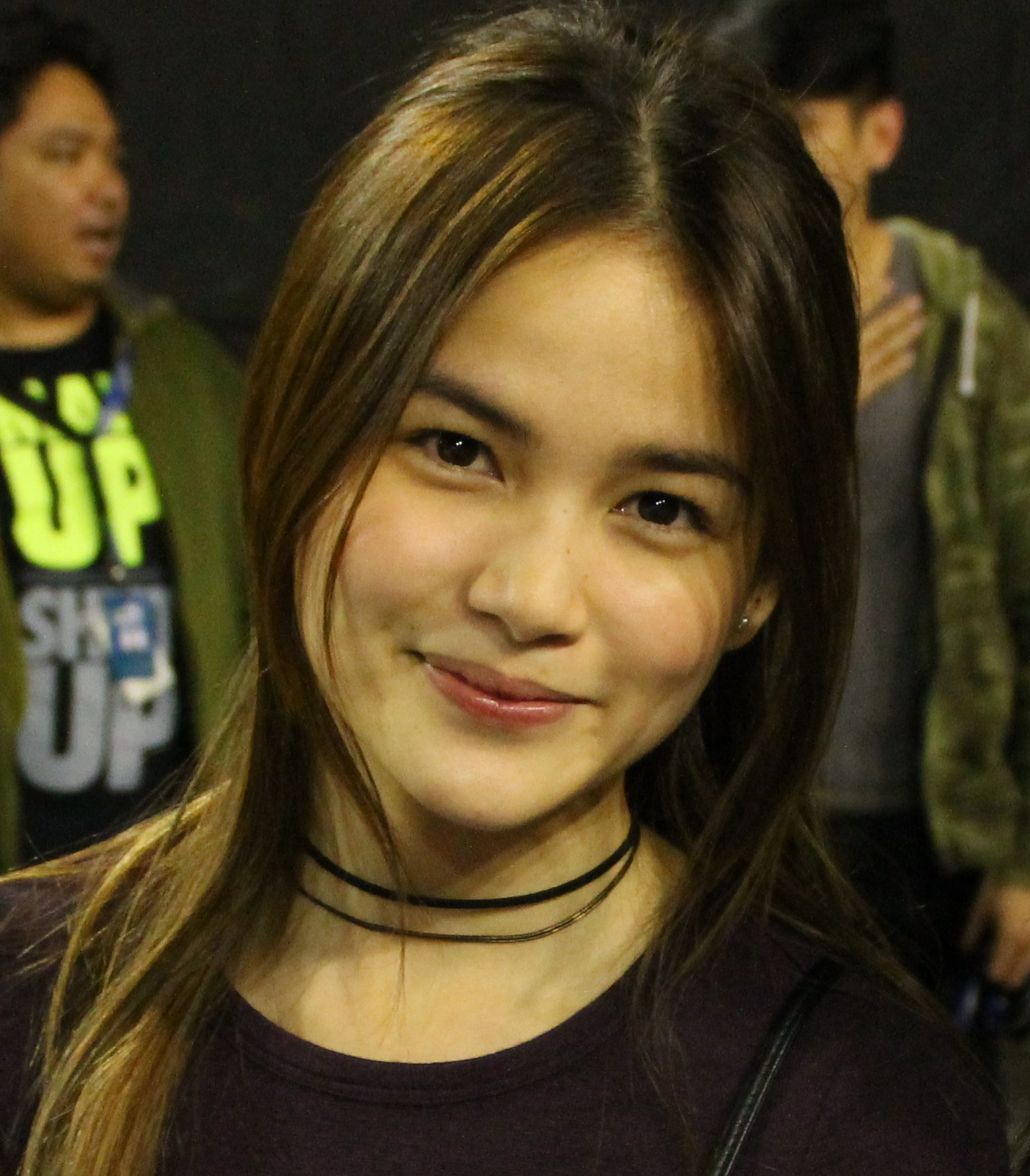
Elisse Joson portrays Rowena.

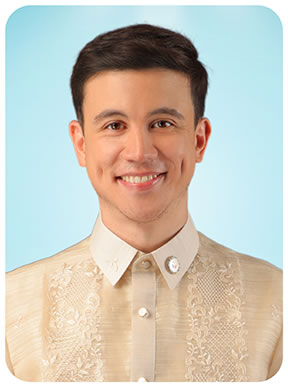
Arjo Atayde portrays the Previous Lizardo

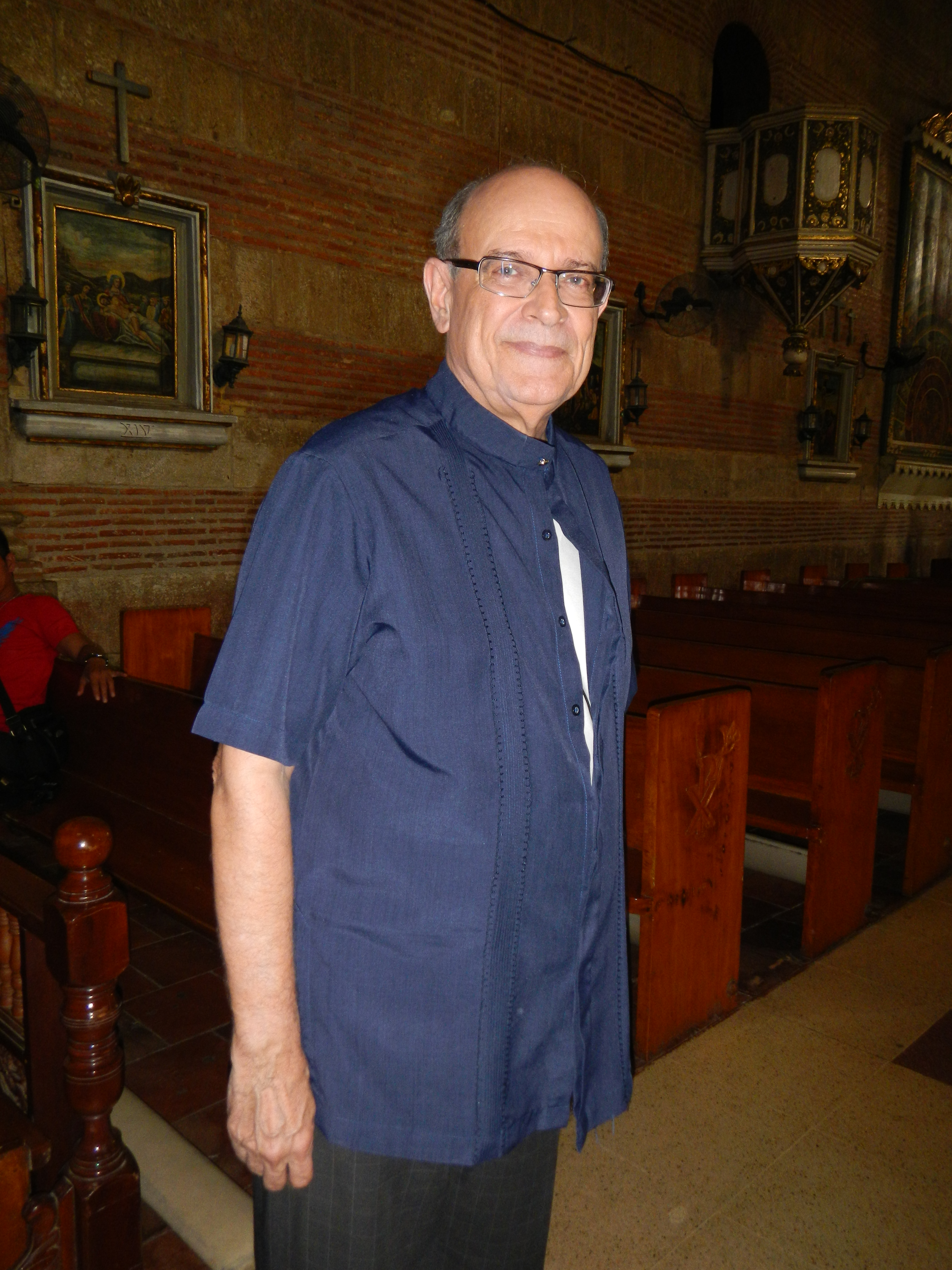
Jaime Fabregas portrays Andoy Batungbakal

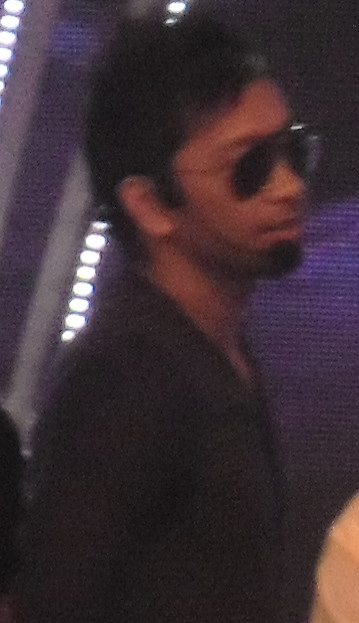
Jhong Hilario portrays Sword Guard

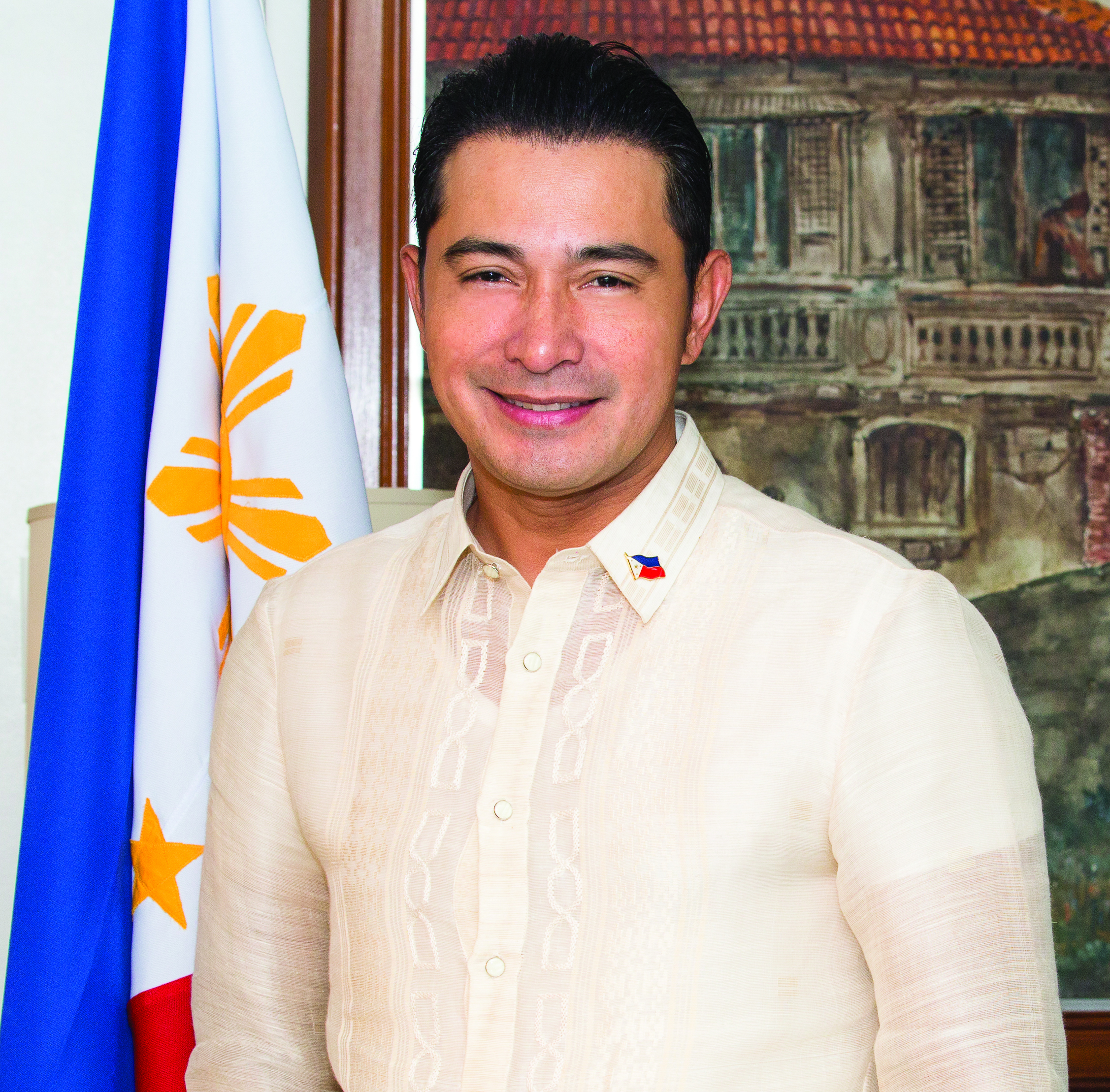
Cesar Montano portrays Police Chief Insp. Erwin Rivera

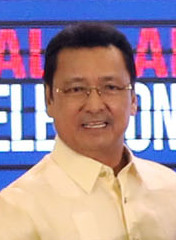
Lito Lapid portrays Apo

- Coco Martin as Flavio Batungbakal III/Panday

The grandson of the original blacksmith born in the urban ghetto of Tondo; a tough gang leader but apathetic when it comes to his grandmother Rosa. Family is always his priority while also being keen on becoming the king of the slums of Tondo.

- Jeric Raval as Flavio Batungbakal II

The father of Flavio III and the son of Flavio Sr..

- Fernando Poe, Jr. as Flavio I

The story picture of Ang Panday The grandfather of the original blacksmith Flavio Batungbakal III

- Eddie Garcia as Lucifer

A demonic spirit who gives the new Lizardo ultimate and supreme power.

- Jake Cuenca as Lizardo Montemayor

The False Prophet and the descendant of previous Lizardo

- Elisse Joson as Rowena

The responsible sister in the Batungbakal household who helps Lola Rosa in keeping the family together. She is very vocal on her disgust to Flavio's gang activities.

- Arjo Atayde as the Previous Lizardo

Lizardo's previous form and he is the one who killed Flavio II.

- Gloria Romero as Rosa Batungbakal

A former midwife who took care of Flavio. She did not have any children so she adopted abandoned kids and gave them a family. A loving woman, religious and very firm when it comes to disciplining her adopted children.

- Dimples Romana as Carmen Batungbakal

The mother of Flavio III.

- Jaime Fabregas as Andoy Batungbakal

The adoptive grandfather of Flavio who raised him in a firm way.

- Awra Briguela as Diego

Flavio's younger adopted brother who flaunts a tough stance to cover up on his being homosexual.

- Julio Diaz as Primo

Andoy's brother and Flavio's partner-in-crime

- Nayomi "Heart" Ramos as Ella

The perky sister of Flavio who is persistent and very inquisitive.

- Enzo "Bingo" Pelojero as Itoy

The worrisome and pessimistic amongst the brood who is always anxious for his big brother Flavio.

- James "Paquito" Sagarino as Empoy

The young trouble maker in the family who plays tough cookie and acts like a sidekick to his brother and idol Flavio.

- Cesar Montano as Police C/Insp. Erwin Rivera

A police chief officer in Tondo for mission order of his police members for manhunt operations against Lizardo's henchmen

- Jhong Hilario as Sword Guard

Flavio faced him to get the sword

- Carmi Martin as Delilah Suarez

The mother of Maria who dislikes Flavio.

- Dennis Padilla as Dencio Suarez

The father of Maria and the wife of Delilah who dislikes Flavio.

- Mariel de Leon as Maria Suarez

Flavio's love interest.

- John Medina as SPO3 Dela Cruz

He is one of the police officers in Tondo.

- Lito Lapid as Apo

He is the one who trains Flavio III to be ready to fight with Lizardo.

- McCoy de Leon as Caloy

A reluctant gang member who falls in love with the leader's sister Rowena.

- Michael De Mesa as Eduardo Montemayor

the father of Antonio, the present host of Lizardo.

- Albert Martinez as King Sapiro

the ruler of the Kingdom of the Engkantos.

- Agot Isidro as Queen Esmeralda

the Queen of the Engkantos

Additional cast was also unveiled in Martin's Instagram profile, while they are on the press conference for the announcement: Agot Isidro, Al Vaughn Chier Tuliao, Albert Martinez, Alvin Anson, Ana de Leon, Benj Manalo, Carlos Morales, Ejay Falcon, Epy Quizon, Jay Manalo, Jeff Tam, Jeffrey Santos, Jethro Ramirez, John Prats, John Regala, Joko Diaz, Joonee Gamboa, Kylie Verzosa, Lester Llansang, Long Mejia, Marc Solis, Mark Lapid, Michael De Mesa, Michael Roy Jornales, Mon Confiado, Onyok Pineda as Dwendol, Phoebe Walker, PJ Endrinal, Rhian "Dang" Ramos, Shantel Crislyn Layh "Ligaya" Nugyo, Vhong Navarro, Zaijian Jaranilla, Smugglaz, and Bassilyo.

== Production ==
=== Announcement ===
On April 11, 2017, after winning a Your Face Sounds Familiar: Kids contest, child actor and comedian Awra Briguela stated that he has a new upcoming movie with lead actor Coco Martin. There were no official details revealed including the start of the film's production, and has yet to be titled.

=== Development ===
On April 25, 2017, it was announced that a new Panday reboot is in its development stage when Coco Martin was granted the rights from Carlo J. Caparas to green-light the film, which he will star and direct. The upcoming film of Coco Martin and Awra Briguela turned out to be the second reboot of Ang Panday, which was shown by Briguela, featuring and starring in a supporting role. This is the second time Martin will portray the role first envisioned by Fernando Poe Jr., the first being the twin brothers Ador and Cardo (Kardo in the film version) in the television adaptation of Ang Probinsyano.

=== Pre-production ===
Production on Ang Panday began on June 22, 2017, when Martin posted a picture of him holding a whiteboard with an establishing shot label along with his production crew. The working title was under the name "Panday". Before production began, Martin went to Manila North Cemetery to pay respect to the grave of Poe Jr. so he can get some assistance. He wanted his direction be inspired by prominent Filipino directors such as Mike De Leon and Lino Brocka.

On July 4, 2017, Martin confirmed the complete set of cast for the film. He revealed that Binibining Pilipinas International candidate Mariel de Leon would co-star in the film as Martin's leading lady, along with some of his co-stars in Ang Probinsyano, including Onyok Pineda and Awra Briguela.

On July 24, Jake Cuenca was cast as the key villain Lizardo.

On September 27, Martin has announced that one more beauty queen will be joining the Ang Panday cast besides Mariel de Leon. It was revealed on November 9, 2017, that Kylie Verzosa is the new beauty queen that joined the cast.

=== Filming ===
Principal photography began on July 9, 2017. On July 20, a video clip of Martin on the set of the film was posted on the actor's Instagram account. During filming, Cuenca was also given advice by lead actor and director Coco Martin on how to accomplish things correctly. Carlo J. Caparas was also involved in production by the said film, and he is open to random ideas for Coco Martin. Location shoots were held in Pakil, Laguna. Filming wrapped on October 25, 2017.

== Soundtrack ==
On August 18, Filipino rapper and songwriter Gloc-9 posted in his Facebook account that he will write a song about a man who creates swords. On September 25, Gloc-9 shared an Instagram post by Coco Martin stating that the title of the theme song will be Ang Panday and the song will feature Ebe Dancel. The song was finally released on November 24, 2017, through digital platforms such as Spotify and Apple Music.

On November 24, the official music video for Peksman (an original song by the band Siakol) was uploaded on YouTube while the song was released on December 1. The song was sung by the movie's director, main cast and producer Coco Martin featuring Zaito, Basilyo, Jeff Tam, Smugglaz and Shernan. Also featuring FlipTop rappers Bassilyo, Smugglaz, Zaito, and Shernan, another single from the film was released entitled Mas Liligaya Ang Pasko with Coco Martin as its main artist. The song was released on December 15.

== Release ==
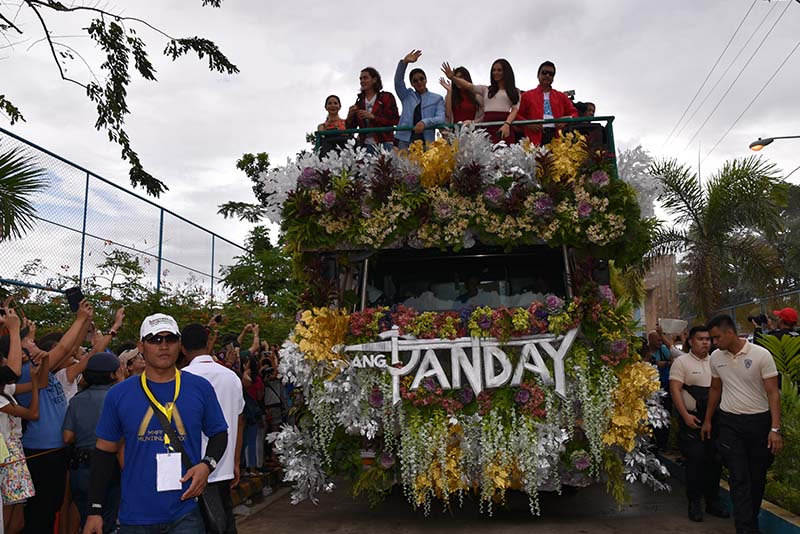
Float of Ang Panday at the MMFF Parade of the Stars

The film is scheduled to be released on December 25, 2017, as an official submission entry of 2017 Metro Manila Film Festival. The official poster of Ang Panday was released on November 17, 2017; alongside another competing 2017 Metro Manila Film Festival entry, Gandarrapiddo: The Revenger Squad.

=== Box office ===
Ang Panday along with Gandarrapiddo: The Revenger Squad had a combined box office gross of ₱125 million in the opening day of the MMFF. It was later reported that Ang Panday was the second most sold film in the box office during the official run of the 2017 Metro Manila Film Festival grossing ₱234 million behind The Revenger Squad. At the end of its box office run, the film grossed ₱379 million.

As of January 11, 2024 The Movie of Coco Martin's Ang Panday was ₱583 Million in 43th Metro Manila Film Festival was Surpassed by Dingdong Dantes and Marian Rivera's Movie of 49th Metro Manila Film Festival has Already Grossing Film ₱924 million Said from Actor Producer and Director Coco Martin.

=== Critical response ===
The film drew mixed reviews from critics. Wanggo Gallaga of News5 wrote, "It's a huge story that keeps jumping from subplot to subplot. It's audacious in its presentation of this narrative." He added that it fails to live up to the audacity and bigness of its ambitions, the film scores 8.5 out of 10 via critics and audiences.

=== Accolades ===
List of accolades
Award / Film Festival	Category	Recipient(s)	Result
2017 Metro Manila Film Festival
2017 Metro Manila Film Festival	Fernando Poe Jr. Memorial Award	Ang Panday	Won
2017 Metro Manila Film Festival	Best Director	Coco Martin	Nominated
2017 Metro Manila Film Festival	Best Actor in a Leading Role	Coco Martin	Nominated
2017 Metro Manila Film Festival	Best Actor in a Supporting Role	Jake Cuenca	Nominated
2017 Metro Manila Film Festival	Best Child Actor (PMPC STAR AWARDS)	Enzo Pelojero	Nominated
2017 Metro Manila Film Festival	Best Visual Effects	Ang Panday	Won
2017 Metro Manila Film Festival	Children’s Choice Award	Ang Panday	Won
2017 Metro Manila Film Festival	Special Jury Prize	Coco Martin tied with Nick Joaquin of Ang Larawan	Won

== Other media ==
A new tie-in game has been announced for release on iOS and Android. The game's plot involves Flavio on a quest to travel through different worlds and retrieve the powerful sword of Panday, while saving the world from evil forces.
