= Tulay (EP) =

TULAy

EP by Gloc-9
- Released: June 7, 2019
- Genre: Hip hop
- Length: 22:02
- Label: Universal Records

Gloc-9 chronology
Rotonda (2017)	TULAy (2019)

Gloc-9 EP chronology
Rotonda (2017)	TULAy (2019)

Singles from TULAy
- 1. "Lagi" Released: July 27, 2018; 2. "Maleta" Released: February 15, 2019; 3. "Sino" Released: 2019

Tulay (transl. Overpass; stylized as TULAy) is a five-track EP by Filipino rapper Gloc-9. It is Gloc-9's third EP after Limang Kanta Lang and Rotonda.

== Track listing ==
No.	Title	Length
1.	"Pamaypay" (featuring JKris)	3:34
2.	"Totoo" (featuring Zjay and Lirah Bermudez)	3:46
3.	"Lagi" (featuring Al James)	3:44
4.	"Maleta" (featuring Julie Anne San Jose)	4:47
5.	"Sino" (featuring Abaddon & Smugglaz)	6:11
