= Ang Panday (song) =

Single by Gloc-9 & Ebe Dancel

from the album Ang Panday
- Language: Filipino
- Released: November 19, 2017
- Studio: Studio Z Audio Production and Recording Studio, Quezon City
- Genre: Hip hop; rock rap
- Length: 3:38
- Label: ABS-CBN Film Productions, Inc.
- Songwriter: Aristotle Pollisco

Gloc-9 singles chronology
"Ice Tubig" (2017)	"Ang Panday" (2017)	"TRPKNNMN" (2017)

"Ang Panday" (transl. The blacksmith) is a single by Filipino singer Ebe Dancel and rapper Gloc-9 from the 2017 motion picture Ang Panday. The song was written by Aristotle Pollisco and was released on November 19, 2017. Ang Panday serves as the third song that Gloc-9 and Dancel collaborated. Also, Ang Panday is Dancel's third film he performed a song for in 2017, after Ang Larawan and Last Night.

== Music video ==
The music video for the song was released on January 15, 2018, and was directed by Ian Celis. A behind-the-scenes look at the music video were uploaded online on November 16, 2017.

== Track listing ==
Digital download
No.	Title	Length
1.	"Ang Panday"	3:38
