= Skull the Slayer =

- Cover of Skull the Slayer #1 (August 1975)

Publication information
- Publisher: Marvel Comics
- First appearance: Skull the Slayer #1 (August 1975)
- Created by: Marv Wolfman (writer); Steve Gan (artist)

In-story information
- Alter ego: James Patrick "Jim" Scully
- Species: Human
- Notable aliases: Blazing Skull
- Abilities: Scorpion power belt grants: Enhanced strength and durability

Skull the Slayer (James Patrick Scully) is a character appearing in American comic books published by Marvel Comics. The character debuted in his own book in August 1975.

== Creation ==
The idea of Skull the Slayer came to Marv Wolfman in 1973, while working as an assistant editor for DC Comics. Wolfman stated the basic concept:

thrust an entire mid-town Manhattan office building into a prehistoric setting-into jungle inhabited by dinosaurs, and observe how us sedentary modern-types would cope on a totally alien yet familiar world. But the setting was to be more than simply a dinosaur comic. there would be a secondary plotline... one dealing with cavemen, and, shall we give the secret away-? Other time periods, the Bermuda Triangle and more! In effect, four years past, the intention was for Skull to become a cosmic dinosaur series.

== Publication history ==
Skull the Slayer had his own ongoing series starting in August 1975, which ran for eight issues. He appeared later in Quasar, Fantastic Four, X-Men, and Squadron Supreme series.

== Fictional character biography ==
Skull the Slayer is a trained soldier turned superhero who wears a Scorpion power belt that enhances his strength and durability. The belt also has preservative effects on his body's metabolism. On one occasion, Scully was able to funnel energy into explosive force. The full capabilities of the belt are unknown.

Jim Scully was an adventurer whose plane went through a time warp in the Bermuda Triangle, marooning him and three companions in an alternate Earth where dinosaurs, primitives, and aliens co-existed. Scully and his three companions were eventually rescued and returned to their own world by the Thing of the Fantastic Four. He served in Doctor Druid's team of occult investigators the Shock Troop, alongside Sepulchre and N'Kantu, the Living Mummy. He was attempting to find a way to remove the power belt, which had been damaged and given him a skeletal appearance. During this time, he had adopted the alias of the Blazing Skull. He crossed paths with heroes such as Quasar and Captain America while a member of the team. Eventually, Doctor Druid was able to restore him to his normal appearance and he left the team. Sometime later, Scully's attempts to remove the belt caused him to lose the youthful metabolism that the belt provided.

Skull the Slayer finds his way back to the alternate Earth as the member of a prospecting expedition, along with Lee Forrester, and sends a message back to Earth, asking to be saved. By the time the X-Men and the Future Foundation arrive to rescue them, Forrester and Skull have been trapped for three years while only days have passed on Earth. The two decide to stay behind, having fallen in love during their time together, and safeguard two artifacts that would ensure peace between the alternate Earths' tribes.

== Powers and abilities ==
Skull the Slayer has no superpowers, but wears a Scorpion power belt that enhances his strength and durability.

== Other versions ==
During the Secret Wars storyline, a variation of Skull the Slayer resides in the Battleworld domain of Weirdworld. Following a battle with Arkon, Skull encounters Jennifer Kale, who recruits him into a rebellion against Morgan le Fay.

== Collected editions ==
- Skull the Slayer; collects Skull the Slayer #1-8, Marvel Two-in-One #35-36; Marvel, 2015.
