= Raquel Monteza =

Filipino actress

Raquel Monteza (born Maria Teresa Calimbahin Rounsaville on September 30, 1955) is a Filipino actress.

== Career ==
Monteza appeared in films such as What Am I Living For (1970) starring Eddie Peregrina, Kapag May Gusot, May Lusot (1973), Sapin-sapin, Patong-patong (1976), Bona (1980), Bakit Bughaw ang Langit? (1981), all starring Nora Aunor, and Zuma (1985) starring Max Laurel. She also appeared in Anthony Taylor's Dyesebel (1978) and Danny Zialcita's To Love Again (1983).

Monteza also appeared in TV series such as Anna Liza (1980) as Miriam starring Julie Vega, Sana Ay Ikaw Na Nga (2001) starring Dingdong Dantes and Tanya Garcia, Te Amo (2004) as Mercy, Undang's bubbly mother, starring Iza Calzado, Marimar" (2007) as Innocencia starring Marian Rivera and Dingdong Dantes aired in GMA Network, and Felina: Prinsesa ng mga Pusa (2012) starring Arci Muñoz, Ahron Villena and Carla Humphries, Ang Panday (2016) as Tiya Flor starring Richard Gutierrez aired in TV5.

In 2018, Monteza was ventured to her radio career on DZRH for her weekly infotainment program Dear Ate Raquel. She appeared in the film Pusoy (2022), playing the mother of the lead character, Popoy.

== Personal life ==
Monteza was born to an American father and a Filipino mother. She is married to former actor Jun Soler and is the mother of actors Ryan Soler (a FAMAS Best Child Actor awardee) and Symon Soler, who also became the lead singer of the Filipino boy band Jeremiah. Her other children are Miss Makati 2008 and singer Maffy Soler, who is also the wife of actor Robin da Roza, and Judge Soler.

== Filmography ==
=== Film ===
Year	Title	Role	Note(s)	Ref(s).
1970	For Once in My Life			
1970	What Am I Living For			
1970	Silang Tatlo			
1970	Johnny Baby, Please Come Home!			
1970	El Pinoy Tom Jones			
1971	Motorcycle Boy			
1971	Toro! Tora! Toray!			
1971	Akin ang Huling Awit			
1971	Currimao			
1971	Paolo Peligroso			
1972	Kung May Gusot, May Lusot			
1972	Dalagang Nayon			
1973	Kondesang Basahan			
1973	Cofradia			
1974	Ang Bituin at Araw			
1975	Teribol Dobol		Cameo role	
1976	Makamandag si Adora			
1976	Escolta: Mayo 13... Biyernes ng Hapon!			
1977	Ang Isinilang Ko Ba'y Kasalanan?			
1977	Bawat Himaymay ng Aking Laman			
1977	Ako si Emma, Babae!			
1977	Sapin-Sapin, Patong-Patong			
1978	Dyesebel	Betty	Credited as "Raquel Montessa"	
1980	Bona	Nancy		
1981	Bakit Bughaw ang Langit?			
1981	Ibalik ang Swerti			
1982	Alias Django			
1983	To Love Again			
1984	Death Raiders			
1985	Zuma		Credited as "Racquel Monteza"	
1986	Mga Anghel ng Diyos			
1990	Walang Sinasanto ang Bala Ko			
1997	Matrikula			
2004	Masikip sa Dibdib: The Boobita Rose Story	Boss' wife		
2005	Bikini Open			
2022	Breathe Again			
2022	Pusoy	Mother of Popoy		

=== Television ===
Year	Title(s)	Role(s)
2019	The Gift	Lolita Anzures
2019	Maynila: Daddy-cated	Pilita
2019	Maalaala Mo Kaya: Passport	Gloria
2019	My Special Tatay	Gardo's Mother
2017-2018	Kambal, Karibal	Mildred Abaya
2017	Haplos	Adele "Del" Alonzo
2015	The Rich Man's Daughter	Julie Limjoco
2014	Ikaw Lamang	Dr. Borromeo
2014	The Legal Wife	Maria
2013	Maalaala Mo Kaya: Kulungan	Emily
2013	Magpakailanman: The Jessa Aquino Story	Rose
2012	Maalaala Mo Kaya: Apoy	Aling Tena
2012	Aso ni San Roque	Mely Martinez
2012	Wansapanataym: Hungry Birds	Celia
2012	Felina: Prinsesa ng mga Pusa	Donya Regina
2011	Maalaala Mo Kaya: Tulay III	Leng
2011	Wansapanataym: My Mumu	Rica
2011	Angelito: Batang Ama	Cecille
2011	Alakdana	Olga Gaston
2010	Claudine	Janet
2010	Maalaala Mo Kaya: Pera	Jane
2010	Magkaribal	Claire
2009	Maalaala Mo Kaya: Pregnancy Kit	Joy
2009	Obra: Taong Grasa	Nancy
2009	The Bud Brothers Series: Red Roses for a Blue Lady	Ingrid Artiaga
2007	Asian Treasures	Ingrid's Mother

- Maalaala Mo Kaya - "Board Game" (2008)
- Maalaala Mo Kaya - "Card" (2008)
- MariMar (2007)
- Mga Kuwento ni Lola Basyang - "Ang Mahiwagang Kuba" (2007)
- Maalaala Mo Kaya - "Pilat" (2007)
- Calla Lily (2006)
- Te Amo, Maging Sino Ka Man (2004)
- Ang Iibigin Ay Ikaw Pa Rin (TV series) (2003)
- Sana Ay Ikaw Na Nga (TV series) (2002)
- Maalaala Mo Kaya - "Agua Bendita" (1999)
- Anna Liza (1980–1985)

=== Radio ===
- Dear Ate Raquel (DZRH) (2018–present)
