= Bona (film) =

1980 drama film by Lino Brocka

- Official poster of the film for the 6th Metro Manila Film Festival
- Directed by: Lino Brocka
- Written by: Cenen Ramones
- Produced by: Nora Villamayor
- Starring: Nora Aunor; Phillip Salvador
- Cinematography: Conrado Baltazar
- Edited by: Augusto Salvador
- Music by: Max Jocson
- Production company: NV Productions
- Distributed by: NV Productions
- Release date: December 25, 1980
- Running time: 85 minutes
- Country: Philippines
- Language: Filipino
- Box office: ₱13 million

Bona is a 1980 Filipino drama film directed by Lino Brocka and written by Cenen Ramones. Starring Nora Aunor in a title role, the story follows a young girl who was infatuated with a bit actor, played by Phillip Salvador, but this obsession leads to negative consequences. It also stars Rustica Carpio, Marissa Delgado, Venchito Galvez, Joel Lamangan, Spanky Manikan, Raquel Montesa, and the members of the PETA Kalinangan Ensemble in either supporting or minor roles.

Produced by NV Productions (Aunor's production company), the film premiered in the Philippines on December 25, 1980, as one of the official entries to the 6th Metro Manila Film Festival. It subsequently premiered in France on May 23, 1981, as one of the 22 films exhibited under the 34th Cannes Film Festival's Director's Fortnight section.

In 2024, the digitally restored version of the film premiered at the 77th Cannes Film Festival during the Cannes Classics section. It had its local Philippine premiere as the closing film of the 20th Cinemalaya Film Festival.

== Plot ==
Bona is a high school student who belongs to a middle-class family. She is an admirer of Gardo, a stuntman who works in Philippine cinema productions. Bona is among a group of movie star admirers who tag along with film productions, and she is seen observing him shoot movie scenes, cheering for him in basketball games, and encouraging him to negotiate to get bit parts in movies. Bona has started neglecting household chores and getting home late, to her parents' chagrin.

One night, Bona accompanies Gardo to his home in an impoverished slum area with no running water. He is beaten up by unknown men, and Bona brings him to his home to tend to him. Bona ends up spending the night and does chores for Gardo, including lining up to draw water from a common well, giving Gardo warm baths, and cleaning his home. Gardo says that he was beaten up by relatives of a woman who fell in love with him and laments that his injuries may take a few days to heal, although he appears happy to have Bona caring for him. When Bona finally goes back home, she is beaten severely by her father for causing worry and for not informing the family of her whereabouts. Bona runs away and asks to live with Gardo. She continues providing unpaid labor for Gardo.

Bona's father is able to find her in Gardo's home and angrily demands that Gardo marry Bona. Gardo refuses and says he does not know Bona and only agreed for her to live with him, upon her request. Bona's father erupts in anger and is intent on bringing Bona back home, but he collapses in an apparent heart attack. Bona's mother asks her to stay with the family, but Bona refuses and goes back to Gardo's home.

One day, Bona gets into a fight with the woman spending time with Gardo in his home. Bona drives her out of Gardo's house. Gardo wakes up and asks what the dispute was about. Bona asks him not to bring women to her home. Gardo corrects her and says the home is not hers and threatens to throw her out. Bona pleads to stay with him. On a later evening, Gardo and Bona sleep together.

One time, Gardo spends time out of the house, ostensibly to work on a film shoot. Later, Gardo returns home with a woman, Annie, who is younger than Bona and is visibly distraught. Gardo has likely gotten her pregnant, and she is afraid of the consequences. Gardo and Bona later take Annie to a local herbologist for an abortion, which Bona pays for. Later, Gardo brings home a rich older woman, Katrina, with expensive gifts for Bona on her birthday.

Later, Bona is informed of her father's death. Bona tries to visit her father's funeral but is driven away by her brother, who blames her for the death. Bona returns home and finds Katrina, who informs her that Gardo will now live with her and that Bona must now return to her family. Gardo later returns home and informs Bona that he will be migrating to the United States with Katrina, who is a rich widow, and that he has decided to sell his house. Bona says that she is unable to return to her family, but Gardo says he is not responsible for her. He asks Bona to prepare hot water for his bath. Bona takes the boiling water and pours it onto Gardo. The movie ends with Gardo screaming as he is severely burned.

== Cast ==
- Nora Aunor as Bona
- Phillip Salvador as Gardo
- Raquel Montesa as Nancy
- Rustica Carpio as Nena, Bona's mother
- Marissa Delgado as Katrina
- Venchito Galvez as Domeng, Bona's father
- Nanding Josef as Nilo
- Spanky Manikan as Bona's brother
- Archi Adamos as Tambay
- Rene Hawkins as Rene
- Joel Lamangan as Director
- The PETA Kalinangan Ensemble
- Naty Mallari
- Ruby Ruiz as Bona's Sister

== Production ==
=== Writing ===
Cenen Ramones, the film's writer, originally wrote Bona as a teleplay for a television series Babae, with Laurice Guillen playing the title role. When the teleplay was adapted for film, director Lino Brocka decided to make changes, with the film being focused on Bona's obsession with Gardo, instead of the love angle. Brocka believed that Bona's infatuation with Gardo was deemed "too standard".

== Release ==
The film was an official entry to the 6th Metro Manila Film Festival. It held its international premiere at the 34th Cannes Film Festival in May 1981, as part of the Directors' Fortnight. This marked Brocka's second appearance at the Cannes Directors' Fortnight, following the premiere of Insiang at the 29th Cannes Film Festival in May 1976.

=== Restoration ===
After its initial release in 1980, the film remained largely unseen. Amongst Philippine film circles, it was believed that the film was lost after negatives and prints of films produced by NV Productions were destroyed in a fire.

In 2017, film historian Jose B. Capino was doing research for his book of essays on Brocka, Martial Law Melodrama: Lino Brocka's Cinema Politics, when he learned about the existence of the film's original film negatives in France through producer and Cannes Film Festival talent scout Pierre Rissient; Capino was also able to find Brocka's 1979 film Jaguar, which was later restored by the Film Development Council of the Philippines. Capino later suggested the film to boutique film distributor Kani Releasing, which later spearheaded its 4K restoration alongside French distributor Carlotta Films.

In 2023, the first 20 minutes of the restoration was screened at the Marché du Film in Cannes, France. The fully restored film premiered at the 2024 Cannes Film Festival as part of the Cannes Classics section. earning raves from director Sean Baker and other Festival attendees. The film was also screened at the 49th Toronto International Film Festival, as part of the TIFF Classics section. It also had its local Philippine premiere as the closing film of the 2024 Cinemalaya Film Festival.

=== Home media ===
Kani Releasing released the film on 4K UHD and Blu-ray in 2025.

== Reception ==
=== Critical response ===
Bona has been considered one of the Philippines' greatest movies. It was also cited as one of "The Best 100 Films in the World" by the Museum of Tolerance in Los Angeles, USA, in 1997 and has been screened in different film festivals around the world, albeit receiving mixed reviews.

In a contemporary review for The New York Times, critic Lawrence Van Gelder noted the film was interesting as a glimpse of Philippine life, but found fault in the directing and writing for failing to give valid explanations to the obsession.

Barbara Wurm, Berlin- and Vienna-based film historian, critic, and programmer, described Philippine cinema's Superstar as "the awesome Nora Aunor", during the film's screening at the 47 Vienna International Film Festival in 2009.

Upon the release of the restoration at the Cannes Classics, Bona received positive comments and reviews.

=== Accolades ===
Year	Group	Category	Nominee	Result
1982	Figueira da Foz International Film Festival	Premio de le Juri de la Federacion Internationale des Cine Clubs (Jury Prize of the International Federation of Cinema Clubs)		Won
1981	Filipino Academy of Movie Arts and Sciences (FAMAS) Awards	Best Actress	Nora Aunor	Nominated
1981	Gawad Urian Awards (Manunuri ng Pelikulang Pilipino)	Best Actress	Nora Aunor	Won
1981	Gawad Urian Awards (Manunuri ng Pelikulang Pilipino)	Best Actor	Philip Salvador	Nominated
1981	Gawad Urian Awards (Manunuri ng Pelikulang Pilipino)	Best Director	Lino Brocka	Nominated
1981	Gawad Urian Awards (Manunuri ng Pelikulang Pilipino)	Best Picture		Nominated

== Adaptations ==
In 2012, as part of its 45th season, the Philippine Educational Theater Association staged a contemporary adaptation written by Layeta Bucoy and directed by Socrates 'Soxie" Tapacio. Eugene Domingo played Bona, while EA Guzman played Gino Sanchez, the stage counterpart of the film's Gardo.
