= Donna Villa =

Filipina film producer and actress

- Born: Marian Patalinghug
- Died: January 17, 2017 (aged 57); Manila, Philippines
- Occupations: Film producer, actress
- Spouse: Carlo J. Caparas

Marian Patalinghug, better known as Donna Villa, was a Filipina film producer and actress.

Villa began her career in the entertainment industry as an actress. One of her early roles was in the 1977 film Namangka sa Dalawang Ilog, which starred Romeo Vasquez, Gloria Romero and Alma Moreno.

Originally from Lapu-Lapu City, Donna Villa was married to film director Carlo J. Caparas, with whom she had a son and a daughter. Donna Villa and Caparas were known as the "Golden Couple" and were credited with the "Massacre Era" of the Philippine film industry in the early 1990s. With Caparas, she produced the 1990s films The Vizconde Massacre, The Myrna Diones Story (Lord, Have Mercy), and The Lilian Velez Story: Till Death Do Us Part. One of her last films was the 2017 feature Kamandag ng Droga, which was influenced by President Rodrigo Duterte's war on drugs.

Donna Villa died at the age of 57 on January 17, 2017, at the University of Santo Tomas Hospital in Manila. Initial reports stated that she died from cancer, although her exact cause of death was not disclosed by her family.
