= Kamandag ng Droga =

- Official movie poster
- Directed by: Carlo J. Caparas
- Starring: Christopher de Leon; Sarah Lahbati; Lorna Tolentino; Mark Neumann; Meg Imperial; Ronnie Lazaro; CJ Caparas
- Production company: Viva Films
- Release date: December 5, 2017
- Running time: 130 minutes
- Country: Philippines
- Language: Filipino
- Budget: ₱100 million

Kamandag ng Droga (transl. The Venom of Drugs) is a 2017 Philippine film directed by Carlo J. Caparas. The film tackles how illegal drugs affect the lives of four teenagers.

== Synopsis ==
The story explores in great details the suffering and turmoil of drug pushers and users and its effects on their families, neighborhood and the community, highlighting the personal downfall and social consequences.

== Cast ==
- Sarah Lahbati as Valerie
- CJ Paras as Alfred
- Christopher de Leon as Gardo
- Lorna Tolentino as Ellen
- Mark Neumann as Edgar
- Meg Imperial as Ginger
- Ronnie Lazaro as Uncle Danny
- Assunta de Rossi as Danny's wife
- Eddie Gutierrez (actor) as David
- Niño Muhlach as Mr. Chuantong
- Giselle Sanchez as Mrs. Chuantong
- Ana Roces as Giselle's mother
- Bembol Roco as Giselle's grandfather
- AJ Muhlach as Jimmy
- Jackie Lou Blanco as Valerie's mother
- Tommy Abuel as Father Elmer Fisherman
- Ryan Eigenmann as Mike
- Bobby Andrews as PDEA Agent
- Ricardo Cepeda as Police officer
- Perla Bautista as Abel's grandmother
- Bret Jackson as Abel
- Mocha Uson as Mocha
- TJ Trinidad as Captain
- Ramon Christopher Gutierrez as Drug Lord
- Richie Paul Gutierrez as Drug Lord

== Production ==
Kamandag ng Droga was directed by Carlo J. Caparas, an admitted supporter of President Rodrigo Duterte who is known for his campaign against illegal drugs and whose footage was used in the film. Carparas said that he was inspired to direct the film by his wife who requested him to work on a film that would tackle the "really rampant drug situation" in the country. Caparas and his wife said that they have seen relatives fall to drug addiction.

The production budget for the film produced by Viva Films was ₱100 million. Filming of Kamandag ng Droga was finished in late 2016 but editing work on the film proceeded almost a year later due to the death of Caparas' wife, Donna Villa.

Caparas said that the film is not a propaganda in favor of Duterte and his anti-drug campaign. He says that the film is a "cry against drugs whose effect affects the family of those addicted to them, thus bringing a lot of damage to the entire community" and intends the film as medium to remind Filipinos that the illegal drug situation in the country could be resolved through cooperation with authorities and law enforcers.

== Release ==
The film premiered on December 5, 2017.

== Critical reception ==
Francis Joseph Cruz of Rappler, an editorial news website critical of Duterte was critical of Kamandag ng Droga calling it a "grand showcase of lazy filmmaking" and a propaganda. He described the characters as two-dimensional and their motivation as flimsy. He added that the film's portrayal of the country's illegal drug problem as simplistic.
