= Ice Tubig =

Single by Gloc-9 featuring Mike Luis

from the album Rotonda
- Released: August 11, 2017
- Recorded: 2017
- Genre: Hip hop
- Length: 3:57
- Label: Universal Records Philippines
- Songwriter: Aristotle Pollisco

Music video
- "Ice Tubig" on YouTube

"Ice Tubig" is a single by Filipino rapper and songwriter Gloc-9 featuring Mike Luis. The song's release by Universal Records Philippines was set for July 2017, but was eventually moved a month later. The single is from Gloc-9's five-track EP entitled Rotonda, released months after. In the Philippines, the term ice tubig or ice water refers to cold water in a plastic bag intended to be made into ice and sold as such but is bought before the water freezes so that the customer can drink it immediately.

== Background and composition ==
After his one-project deal with Star Records, Gloc-9 returned to the Universal Records Philippines label. On this return, also in celebration of his twentieth year in the Philippine music industry, Gloc-9 recorded an EP entitled Rotonda, from which the song "Ice Tubig" would be his first single. The song is about a girl whose love for his partner has gone cold as ice tubig. "Ice Tubig" is a light dance track, which Gloc-9 admitted he had not done in a long time.

== Track listing ==
Digital download
No.	Title	Length
1.	"Ice Tubig" (featuring Mike Luis)	3:57
