= Rotonda (EP) =

EP by Gloc-9
- Released: October 9, 2017
- Genre: Hip hop
- Length: 20:39
- Label: Universal Records

Gloc-9 chronology
Sukli (2016)	Rotonda (2017)	TULAy (2019)

Gloc-9 EP chronology
Limang Kanta Lang (2006)	Rotonda (2017)	TULAy (2019)

Singles from Rotonda
- 1. "Ice Tubig" Released: August 11, 2017; 2. "TRPKNNMN" Released: December 12, 2017; 3. "Norem" Released: 2018

Rotonda (lit. 'Roundabout') is an EP by Filipino rapper Gloc-9. It is Gloc-9's second EP after the EP Limang Kanta Lang which was released independently in 2006. Also, this EP is his comeback record on Universal Records after his one-project deal with Star Music. The album includes the track "Rotonda" which features Joey Ayala and the album's carrier single "Ice Tubig", a collaboration with Mike Luis.

== Track listing ==
No.	Title	Length
1.	"Rico J"	2:24
2.	"Ice Tubig" (featuring Mike Luis)	3:46
3.	"TRPKNNMN" (featuring Agsunta)	3:38
4.	"Mamang Poser Skit"	1:46
5.	"Norem" (featuring J. Kris, Abaddon & S.Dope)	4:40
6.	"Rotonda" (featuring Joey Ayala)	4:25
Total length:		20:39
