= Max Alvarado =

Filipino actor (1929–1997)

- Born: Gavino Maximo Teodosio; 19 February 1929; Manila, Philippine Islands
- Died: 6 April 1997 (aged 68); Metro Manila, Philippines
- Resting place: Manila North Cemetery
- Occupation: Filipino actor
- Years active: 1948–1997
- Awards: FAMAS Best Supporting Actor (1971) for Ang Kampana ng Sta. Quiteria

Max Alvarado (born Gavino Maximo Teodosio; 19 February 1929 – 6 April 1997) was a Filipino film actor known mainly by his portrayals of villains in a career which spanned six decades.

== Early life ==
Max Alvarado was born as Gavino Maximo Teodosio in Manila. In his youth, he was a member of street gangs, as well as an itinerant manual laborer.

== Career ==
He broke into films in 1948 as a bit player in Halik sa Bandila. Soon after, he was frequently cast as a villain in films produced by Premiere Production and its sister company, Larry Santiago Productions, as well as People's Pictures. He first gained critical notice in the 1952 film Ang Sawa sa Lumang Simboryo directed by Gerry de Leon. For that role, he garnered a FAMAS Best Supporting Actor nomination. Ultimately, Alvarado was nominated for 5 FAMAS Best Supporting Actor nominations, winning the trophy in 1971 for Ang Kampana ng Sta. Quiteria.

Alvarado was also nominated for a FAMAS Best Actor award in 1968 for Tatak Sakramentos. Beginning in 1967 with Alyas Chain Gang, he was cast in leading and supporting roles even as a romantic lead, despite his swarthy and somewhat villainous appearance. Alvarado also showcased his versatility by sometimes playing gay roles, such as in the 1978 film Gorgonia as well as Non-Villain or supporting Roles. As a villain, Alvarado was frequently cast opposite the heroic roles of Fernando Poe Jr., although he has also portrayed a supporting ally to the latter in films such as "Walang Matigas na Tinapay sa Mainit na Kape" alongside Paquito Diaz, also in a non-antagonist role which starred former child star Vandolph, and fellow villain actor Paquito's younger brother Romy Diaz as the main antagonist.

On March 25, 1982, D'Wild Wild Weng started its theatrical run. In the film Alvarado is paired with Weng Weng, they play a duo who are sent to the countryside to investigate the murder a mayor and his family.

Towards the end of his life, Alvarado became a commercial spokesperson for Maxx candy, a popular rock candy eponymous to his own screen name.

== Filmography ==
=== Film ===
Year	Title	Role
1952	Ang Sawa sa Lumang Simboryo	
1959	Mekeni, Abe	
1961	Noli Me Tángere	Lucas
1961	The Moises Padilla Story	
1965	G-2	Damazol
1965	Kalaban ng Sindikato	Damazol
1965	Interpol: Hadlang sa Manlulupig	Damazol
1965	Contra Señas	Damazol
1965	Mastermind	Damazol
1966	Deadline: Agosto 13	Damazol
1966	Trapped!	Damazol
1966	Blackmail!	Damazol
1971	Alas, Hari at Sota	Sota
1972	Santo Domingo	Carbungco
1973	Zoom, Zoom, Superman!	Tarzan
1974	Shazam Boom	Batmaniac
1974	Dynamite Wong and T.N.T. Jackson	
1980	Ang Panday	Lizardo
1981	For Y'ur Height Only	Columbus
1981	Pagbabalik ng Panday	Lizardo
1982	D' Wild Wild Weng	Lupo
1982	Ang Panday: Ikatlong Yugto	Lizardo
1984	Ang Padrino	Tasyo
1984	Da Best in da West	Tito Tango
1984	Ang Panday IV: Ika-Apat Na Aklat	Lizardo
1985	Hari ng Gatilyo	
1985	Isa-Isa Lang!	
1985	Inday Bote	
1985	Jandro Nakpil: Halang ang Kaluluwa	
1985	Victor Lopez, Jr. (Robinhood ng Tondo)	
1985	Menudo at Pandesal	Maxie Doodle Dandy III
1986	Iyo ang Tondo, Kanya ang Cavite	Ponzo
1986	Balimbing (Mga Taong Hunyango)	
1986	Muslim .357	Imo
1986	Asong Gubat	Ka Tonyo
1986	Ninja Komisyon	Bad Max
1986	Kontra Bandido	
1987	Ang Simaron ng Isabela (Batang Ilocos Sur Part II)	
1987	Humanda Ka... Ikaw ang Susunod	
1987	Feliciano Luces: Alyas Kumander Toothpick, Mindanao	
1987	No Retreat... No Surrender... Si Kumander	
1987	Puto	Elvis
1988	Kambal Tuko	Father To Pak
1988	Bobo Cop	Don Maximo
1988	Buy One, Take One	
1988	Petrang Kabayo at ang Pilyang Kuting	Mang Kulas
1988	Ompong Galapong: May Ulo, Walang Tapon	Blackbeard
1988	Jockey T'yan	
1988	Agila ng Maynila	Badong Busangol
1989	Sgt. Niñonuevo: The Fastest Gun Alive of WPD	Kumander Max
1989	Balbakwa (The Invisible Man)	Father Orella
1993	Dugo ng Panday	Lizardo
1993	Makuha Ka sa Tingin	Banong
1993	Manila Boy	Turko
1993	Dunkin Donato	Mac Dodo
1994	Dino Obrero: Haring Daga	Maxi
1994	Abrakadabra	Siga 1
1995	I Love You, Sabado!	Syndicate Men
1995	Bikini Watch	Mayor Mukhangbato
1996	Ang Misis Kong Hoodlum	Gorgonyo
1996	Ikaw ang Mahal Ko	Mianong

== Selected filmography ==
- 1949 - Kayumangi [Premiere]
- 1949 - Halik sa Bandila [Premiere]
- 1951 - Sisa [Premiere]
- 1952 - Sandino [Manuel Vistan Jr.]
- 1952 - Sawa sa Lumang Simboryo [Premiere]
- 1955 - Dakilang Hudas [People's]
- 1955 - 7 Maria [Larry Santiago]
- 1956 - Desperado [People's]
- 1956 - Lo' Waist Gang [Larry Santiago]
- 1956 - Huling Mandirigma [People's]
- 1956 - Mrs. Jose Romulo [Larry Santiago]
- 1957 - Maskara [Premiere]
- 1957 - Kamay ni Cain [People's]
- 1957 - Bicol Express [Premiere]
- 1957 - Pusakal [People's]
- 1958 - Sta. Rita de Casia [Premiere]
- 1958 - Mga Liham kay Tia Dely [Larry Santiago]
- 1958 - Jeepney Rock [Spotlight]
- 1958 - Glory at Dawn [PMP]
- 1958 - 4 na Pulubi [Larry Santiago]
- 1959 - Mabilis Pa sa Lintik
- 1959 - Ang Maton
- 1959 - Ang Matapang Lamang
- 1960 - Huwag Mo Akong Limutin
- 1960 - Kadenang Putik
- 1961 - The Moises Padilla Story
- 1964 - Kidlat sa Baril
- 1965 - Isa Lang ang Hari
- 1967 - Alias Chain Gang
- 1967 - Durango
- 1967 - Pambraun
- 1968 - Ang Banal, ang Ganid, at ang Pusakal
- 1968 - Dugay Na sa Maynila (Tonto Ka Pa)
- 1968 - Eagle Commandos
- 1969 - Liquidation Squad
- 1969 - Godiva: The Naked Avenger
- 1970 - Totoy Guwapo
- 1971 - Gangsters Daw Kami!
- 1971 - Liezl at ang 7 Hoods
- 1971 - Baldo Is Coming
- 1972 - Kumander Erlinda
- 1972 - Jail Break
- 1972 - Santo Domingo
- 1973 - Sto. Cristo
- 1973 - Zoom, Zoom, Superman!
- 1973 - Hulihin si Tiagong Akyat
- 1974 - Kampanera Kuba [Berto]
- 1974 - Ang Pagbabalik ni Leon Guerrero
- 1975 - Alupihang Dagat
- 1975 - Dugo at Pag-Ibig sa Kapirasong Lupa [Salazar]
- 1976 - Peter Pandesal
- 1977 - Valentin Labrador
- 1977 - Gulapa
- 1977 - Kapten Batuten
- 1978 - Tatak ng Tundo [Enteng]
- 1979 - Nang Umapoy ang Karagatan [Barako]
- 1980 - Ang Panday [Lizardo]
- 1980 - Dolphy's Angels [Bertong Maize]
- 1980 - Kalibre .45
- 1981 - Pagbabalik ng Panday [Lizardo]
- 1981 - Darna at Ding
- 1982 - Daniel Bartolo ng Sapang Bato
- 1982 - Ang Panday: Ikatlong Yugto [Lizardo]
- 1982 - Pepeng Kaliwete
- 1983 - Kapag Buhay ang Inutang
- 1983 - Pieta [Temio]
- 1983 - Roman Sebastian
- 1984 - Ang Panday IV: Ika-Apat Na Aklat [Lizardo]
- 1984 - Pieta: Ikalawang Aklat [Temio]
- 1984 - Kapitan Inggo
- 1984 - Barakuda
- 1984 - Sigaw ng Katarungan [Masu]
- 1984 - Nardong Putik (Kilabot ng Cavite): Version II
- 1984 - Ang Padrino
- 1985 - Isa Isa Lang! [Masong]
- 1985 - Working Boys
- 1985 - Inday Bote [Black Saturday]
- 1985 - Ben Tumbling: A People's Journal Story [Koljack]
- 1986 - Iyo ang Tondo, Akin ang Cavite [Ponso]
- 1986 - Oras ng Kagitingan
- 1986 - Ninja Kids
- 1986 - Muslim .357
- 1986 - Asong Gubat [Ka Tonyo]
- 1987 - No Retreat... No Surrender... Si Kumander
- 1987 - Simaron ng Isabela
- 1987 - Dongalo Massacre
- 1987 - Puto
- 1988 - Kambal Tuko [Father To Pak]
- 1988 - Bobo Cop
- 1988 - Buy One, Take One
- 1988 - Petrang Kabayo at ang Pilyang Kuting [Kulas]
- 1988 - Agila ng Maynila [Badong Busangol]
- 1989 - Da Best in Da West
- 1989 - Captain Yagit [Doktor]
- 1989 - Bala... Dapat kay Cris Cuenca, Public Enemy No. 1
- 1990 - Hulihin Si... Nardong Toothpick
- 1990 - Isang Salop Na Bala
- 1990 - Sgt. Clarin: Bala Para sa Ulo Mo
- 1991 - Manong Gang [Poldo]
- 1992 - Alabang Girls [Mr. Malabanan]
- 1992 - Alyas Pogi 2
- 1993 - Dugo ng Panday [Lizardo]
- 1993 - Bulag, Pipi at Bingi
- 1993 - Manila Boy [Turko]
- 1994 - Hindi Pa Tapos ang Laban
- 1994 - Walang Matigas Na Tinapay sa Mainit Na Kape
- 1994 - Abrakadabra [Siga 1]
- 1995 - Bikini Watch
- 1995 - I Love You Sabado!!!
- 1996 - Ang Misis Kong Hoodlum
- 1996 - Ikaw ang Mahal Ko [Mianong]
- 1996 - Ang Syota Kong Balikbayan
- 1997 - Bagsik ng Kamao
- 1997 - Ang Pinakamahabang Baba sa Balat ng Lupa

== Sources ==
- Garcia, Jessie B. (2004). A Movie Album Quizbook. Iloilo City, Philippines: Erehwon Books & Magazine. pp. 84–86. ISBN 971-93297-0-X.
