= Bentot Jr. =

Filipino actor (1970–2016)

- Born: Luisito Garcia Medina; 8 January 1970
- Died: 5 May 2016 (aged 46); Manila, Philippines
- Resting place: Manila North Cemetery
- Occupation: Actor
- Years active: 1974–2011

Bentot Jr. (born Luisito "Louie" Garcia Medina; January 8, 1970 – May 5, 2016) was a Filipino actor, and the adopted son of the late comedian Bentot. He had an older brother, Nick Medina, who is also known as Bentot Jr.

== Background ==
Bentot Jr.'s first movie role was at the age of 3.5 years old and he made 14 more movies up until 1985, when he left the film industry in favor of his studies. He returned to the industry in 2000 and continued to make movies until his last movie, Djagwar in 2011. He played Lando in Philippines' movie Panday. He made his first international appearance in the Bruceploitation movie The Return of Bruce with Bruce Le and Elizabeth Oropesa.

He won his first award in 1977 Metro Manila Film Festival as Best Child Performer from the movie Ang Lalake, Ang Alamat at ang Baril with actor Fernando Poe Jr. He has received three more trophies for the movies Tatak ng Tondo (1978), Ang Lihim ng Guadalupe (1979), Hoy Tukso Layuan Mo Ako (1980), with awards in 1978 as MMFF-Best Child Performer and two awards from FAMAS as Best Child Actor, respectively.

== Personal life ==
Louie was a graduate of Far Eastern University, BSC Major in Management. He married at the age of 20 to Joni Peralta, became the father of two children, and then separated after three years. He was in a relationship with Teresa. They had one child together.

Bentot Jr. was an active member of the born-again Christian movement, where he was tasked with the evangelist integration for jail ministry, and was working as an agent servicing for Energy Supplier Company, an outsourcing industry company.

== Death ==
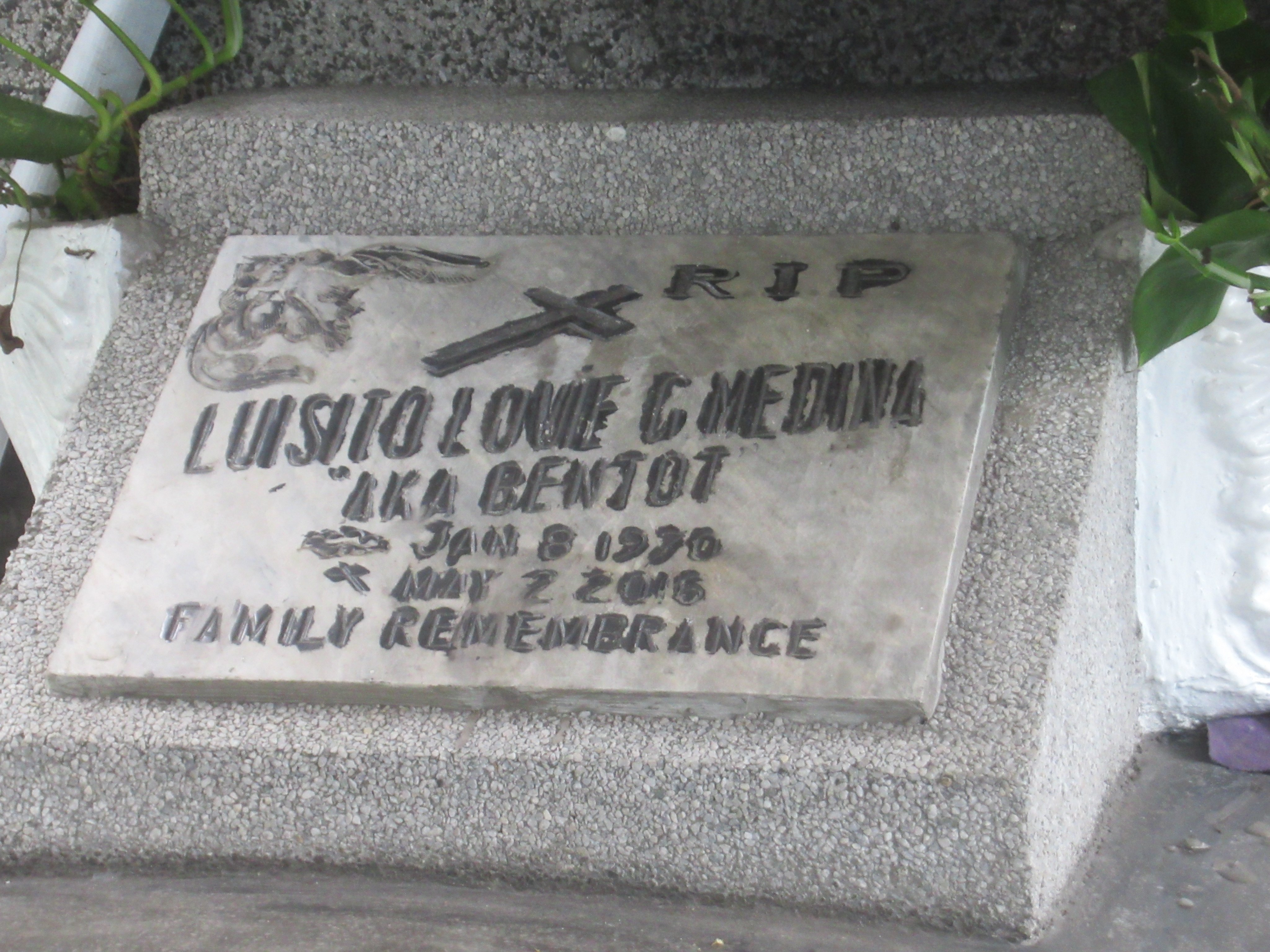
Bentot's grave at Manila North Cemetery.

Bentot Jr. died on May 5, 2016, in Manila, Philippines after suffering a heart attack. He was just 46.

== Filmography ==
- 1973 - Tama Na, Erap
- 1974 - Darna vs. the Planet Women – Ding
- 1975 - Mark of the Dragon
- 1976 - The Return of the Dragon (1st International movie)
- 1977 - Ang Lalake, Ang Alamat at ang Baril (MMFF Awardee)
- 1978 - Super Text
- 1978 - Tatak ng Tondo (MMFF Awardee)
- 1979 - Ang Lihim ng Guadalupe (FAMAS Awardee)
- 1980 - Hoy Tukso Layuan Mo Ako (FAMAS Awardee)
- 1980 - Ang Panday
- 1981 - Pagbabalik ng Panday
- 1982 - Johnny Tanggo Rides Again... Tatanga-tanga, Dakila Naman
- 1982 - Ang Panday: Ikatlong Yugto
- 1984 - Ang Panday IV: Ika-Apat Na Aklat
- 1985 - Campus Beat
- 2000 - Most Wanted
- 2001 - Twosong Twosome
- 2002 - Home Along the River
- 2011 - Dyagwar
