= Carlo J. Caparas =

Filipino comic strip creator (1943–2024)

- Born: Carlo Magno Jose Caparas; March 12, 1944; Pozorrubio, Pangasinan, Philippines
- Died: May 24, 2024 (aged 80)
- Occupations: Comic strip creator and writer Film director Film producer Screenwriter
- Spouse: Donna Villa (died 2017)
- Children: 2

Carlo Magno Jose Caparas (March 12, 1944 – May 24, 2024) was a Filipino comic strip creator, writer, film director, and producer. He was best known for creating several Filipino superheroes and comic book characters, including Panday, Bakekang, Totoy Bato, Joaquin Bordado, Kamagong, Kamandag, Elias Paniki, Tasya Fantasya, and Gagambino, among others. He also gained recognition as the writer-director of numerous sensationalist "massacre" films, such as The Myrna Diones Story, The Maggie dela Riva Story, and Lipa 'Arandia' Massacre.

== Early life ==
Caparas was one of nine children born to a laundrywoman and an unemployed father. To support his family and fund his secondary education, he took on various jobs, including working as a water carrier, boatman, construction labourer, and factory worker. However, he eventually dropped out of school. He was also known for his avid interest in reading.

At the age of 19, Caparas became a security guard at Carmelo and Bauermann Publishing, a local publishing company based in Makati, where he worked the night shift from 11:00 p.m. to 7:00 a.m. During his shifts, he continued his habit of reading, which he later described as spanning "[a thousand] nights." He was once injured by a stray bullet during a company strike, which forced him to take a temporary leave of absence.

During his youth, Caparas developed a passion for the arts. He reportedly used to draw comic strips as a form of expression, particularly to vent his anger towards those he perceived as his oppressors.

== Career ==
=== Comics ===
Caparas' recovery from his gunshot injury provided him with more time to read, which eventually led to the discovery of his storytelling abilities. His first comic story, Citadel, was serialized in Superstar magazine.

At the age of 22, a passerby noticed in his notebook a completed romance comic novella titled Ako'y Nagmamahal Sa'yo, I Am Your Beloved. This became his first published work.

Caparas became known for his significant contributions to Philippine popular culture, particularly during the golden age of komiks from the 1960s to the 1980s. He wrote over 800 novels and short stories for komiks, some of which were later adapted into film and television productions. This earned him the moniker "King of Pinoy Komiks." In 1987, he decided to leave the komiks industry to focus on his family, noting that scriptwriting proved to be more financially rewarding than the slower process of illustration.

In 2007, as part of efforts to revitalise the komiks industry, Caparas led a group of writers and illustrators whose works were later published in newly launched titles. He also proposed activities in coordination with the National Commission for Culture and the Arts (NCCA). These initiatives culminated in the unveiling of five new komiks titles during a ceremony held at the NCCA Building in Intramuros, Manila, led by President Gloria Macapagal Arroyo. Later that year, Caparas began writing a so-called diario novela—the first of its kind in the country—for the Philippine Daily Inquirer, titled To Have and to Hold.

=== Film ===
Caparas began his career in the film industry in the 1980s as a director. Together with his wife, film producer Donna Villa, he co-managed Golden Lion Films International. Villa often assisted in crafting the long, sensational titles of their films. Many of these works were based on true stories involving crimes and outlaws, such as the 1995 film Wilson Sorronda: Leader Kuratong Baleleng Solid Group. A number of his films, popularly known as "massacre films"—which included dramatizations of the Vizconde massacre case and the stories of Lilian Velez and Myrna Diones—were completed in as little as seven days in order to quickly reach audiences. This practice became known as the pito-pito (seven-seven) style and drew criticism from fellow filmmakers. Despite the controversy, some of his films became entries in the Metro Manila Film Festival, achieving box office success and earning award nominations.

In early January 1989, Caparas began producing a film about the Camp Cawa-Cawa siege while the event was still unfolding. He completed the project within two months and released it on March 8 under the title Arrest: Pat. Rizal Alih – Zamboanga Massacre.

In February 2001, Caparas announced plans to produce a film based on the events of EDSA II. This ultimately resulted in the 2003 biographical film Chavit, which focused on politician Chavit Singson. In May 2003, Caparas also offered to produce a biopic about then-Metropolitan Manila Development Authority chairman Bayani Fernando. However, on 31 July 2003, Fernando publicly declined the offer, citing election laws prohibiting premature campaigning ahead of the 2004 Philippine presidential election.

Over the course of his career, Caparas wrote more than one hundred screenplays, many of which he also directed.

== Legal issues ==
In December 1988, a civil case was filed against Caparas and his wife, Donna Villa, by actress Amy Austria, who played the lead role in the biographical film Celestina Sanchez: Bubbles (Enforcer: Ativan Gang), directed by Caparas and produced by Villa. The film, produced under Golden Lion Films, was initially intended to be completed in nearly two weeks. However, due to production delays, it was screened for that year's Metro Manila Film Festival a week later than originally scheduled.

Austria filed the complaint after Caparas hired professional dubbers to record her voice in certain scenes without her consent. Production continued despite her objections. In 1990, the Makati Regional Trial Court Branch 60 dismissed the complaint. The Court of Appeals upheld the dismissal in 1995.

== Later life and death ==
Caparas and his wife, Donna Villa, had two children: a son, CJ, and a daughter, Peach. Villa died from cancer in 2017 at the age of 57.

In 2018, Caparas continued his filmmaking career in collaboration with his daughter, Ysabelle Peach, who was regarded as his sole protégé by blood.

He produced his last film in 2019. However, due to the COVID-19 pandemic, the film has yet to be released.

Caparas died on May 24, 2024, at the age of 80.

== Legacy ==
In 2019, Black Ops Studio was slated to carry out the Viva x Caparas collaboration, which aimed to adapt all of the late writer's major superhero creations. However, the project was stalled due to the COVID-19 pandemic. Following Caparas' death, his protégé and daughter, Ysabelle Peach, is expected to oversee the future of the Caparas titles that were acquired by Viva Entertainment in 2011.

In 2008, the Philippine Postal Corporation (formerly Bureau of Posts) issued two commemorative stamps featuring Caparas, one of which included his comic book character Gagambino. He was also the first Filipino comic book artist to have a street named after him, located in Pasig City.

== Proclamation as National Artist of the Philippines and controversy ==
In July 2009, President Gloria Macapagal Arroyo proclaimed Carlo J. Caparas as one of seven recipients of the Order of National Artist of the Philippines, under a newly introduced category of "Visual Arts and Film".

The title National Artist of the Philippines is the highest state recognition given to individuals who have made significant contributions to the development of Philippine arts. The title is conferred through a presidential proclamation, based on recommendations by the National Commission for Culture and the Arts (NCCA) and the Cultural Center of the Philippines (CCP). Recipients are entitled to several privileges, including a monthly pension, medical and life insurance, a state funeral, a place of honour at national events, and formal recognition in cultural programmes.

However, controversy arose when the NCCA and CCP disclosed that Caparas, along with three other individuals, had not been included in the final shortlist recommended by the joint selection committee. Instead, they were added by President Arroyo through what was described as an exercise of "presidential prerogative". The move prompted strong opposition from the arts community, including several previously conferred National Artists.

Critics raised concerns over Caparas’ eligibility, particularly under the category of Visual Arts, as he was a writer but not the illustrator of his comic books. Others questioned the merit of his inclusion in the Film category, citing that much of his work consisted of low-budget exploitation or so-called massacre films, which were often produced in a rushed pito-pito (seven-day) style and focused on sensational crimes.

National Artist for Literature Bienvenido Lumbera, who was then the chairperson of the Concerned Artists of the Philippines and a member of the joint NCCA-CCP final selection committee, stated that Caparas' nomination had been rejected twice—first under Literature and later under Visual Arts. Film Academy of the Philippines Director General Leo Martinez remarked that Caparas "was obviously added by Malacañang." Caparas was also known as a vocal supporter of President Arroyo at the time.

Following the announcement, protests were held, and numerous petitions and blog posts circulated opposing Caparas' proclamation as a National Artist. Musician and writer Lourd de Veyra, frontman of the band Radioactive Sago Project, satirised the announcement and criticised Caparas in a blog post, likening his work to feces in reference to a sign reading "Bawal Tumae Dito".

The Arroyo administration defended its choices, stating that it would "stand by the qualifications, qualities, track record, and reputation of those named as National Artists". Caparas also defended his proclamation, asserting that other aspirants should "wait for their turn". He encouraged unity within the entertainment industry and called for collective efforts to revitalise the struggling movie and komiks sectors. He attributed his selection to his ability to bridge comics, film, and television, and highlighted his working-class background as a key part of his story.

On July 16, 2013, the Supreme Court of the Philippines nullified the proclamations of Caparas and three others, ruling that the "preferential treatment" extended by President Arroyo violated the equal protection clause of the Constitution. The Court found a "manifest disregard" for the official guidelines and procedures of the NCCA and CCP, as the President considered names not formally recommended by either institution. The ruling stated:

While the Court invalidates today the proclamation of respondents Guidote-Alvarez, Caparas, Mañosa, and Moreno as National Artists, such action should not be taken as a pronouncement on whether they are worthy to be conferred that honour. Only the President, upon the advice of the NCCA and the CCP Boards, may determine that. The Court simply declares that, as the former President committed grave abuse of discretion in issuing Proclamation Nos. 1826 to 1829 dated July 6, 2009, the said proclamations are invalid. However, nothing in this Decision should be read as a disqualification on the part of respondents Guidote-Alvarez, Caparas, Mañosa and Moreno to be considered for the honour of National Artist in the future, subject to compliance with the laws, rules and regulations governing said award.

— Supreme Court En Banc through Associate Justice Teresita J. Leonardo-de Castro

== Filmography ==
=== Film ===
Year	Title	Credited as		Notes
Year	Title	Director	Writer	Notes
1973	Contessa	No	story	
1975	Sa Ngalan ng Ama, at ng Anak...	No	story	
1976	Divino (The Blessed Man)	No	Yes	
1977	Totoy Bato	No	story	
1978	Bakekang	No	story	
1978	Ang Huling Lalaki ng Baluarte	No	story	
1979	Mong	Yes	Yes	Directed with Artemio Marquez
1979	Durugin si Totoy Bato	No	story	
1980	Kung Tawagin Siya'y... Bathala	Yes	Yes	
1980	Target: Kanang Kamay ni Nardo	Yes		Directed with Artemio Marquez
1980	Andres de Saya	No	story	
1980	Angela Markado	No	story	
1980	Ang Panday	No	story	
1981	Ermitaño	Yes		
1981	Ang Babaing Hinugot sa Aking Tadyang	Yes	Yes	
1981	Hari ng Stunt	Yes	Yes	
1981	Ang Maestro	No	story	
1981	Kahit Ako'y Lupa	No	story	
1981	Pagbabalik ng Panday	No	story	
1981	Indio	Yes	Yes	
1982	Alyas Palos II	No	Yes	
1982	Andres de Saya: Mabagsik Na Daw!	No	story	
1982	Ang Panday: Ikatlong Yugto	No	story	
1983	Utol	Yes	Yes	
1983	Pieta	Yes	Yes	
1983	Dugong Buhay	Yes	Yes	
1983	Minsan Pa Nating Hagkan ang Nakaraan	No	story	
1984	Donato: Alakdang Bato	Yes	Yes	
1984	Angkan ng Sietereales	No	Yes	
1984	Pieta: Ikalawang Aklat	Yes	Yes	
1984	Somewhere	No	story	
1984	Daang Hari	No	story	
1984	Sampung Ahas ni Eva	Yes	Yes	
1984	Ang Panday IV: Ika-Apat Na Aklat	No	story	
1985	Sa Dibdib ng Sierra Madre	Yes	Yes	
1985	Jandro Nakpil: Halang ang Kaluluwa	Yes	Yes	Written with Carmelita Del Mundo
1985	S.W.A.K.: Samahang Walang Atrasan sa Kalaban	Yes	Yes	Directed with Dik Trofeo; Written with Woodrow C. Serafin
1985	God... Save Me!	Yes	story	
1986	Anomalya ni Andres de Saya: Part III	Yes	Yes	
1986	Lumuhod Ka sa Lupa!	No	story	
1987	Kamagong	Yes	Yes	
1987	Anak ng Lupa	No	story	
1987	Mga Lahing Pikutin	Yes	Yes	
1987	Susuko Ba Ako Inay?	No	Yes	
1988	Knock Knock, Who's There?	Yes	Yes	
1988	Joaquin Burdado	Yes	Yes	
1988	Kambal Na Kamao: Madugong Engkwentro	Yes	Yes	
1988	Sandakot Na Bala	No	story	
1988	Celestina Sanchez, Alyas Bubbles – Enforcer: Ativan Gang	Yes	Yes	
1989	Arrest: Pat. Rizal Alih – Zamboanga Massacre	Yes	Yes	
1989	Limang Daliri ng Diyos	No	Yes	
1989	Ang Mahiwagang Daigdig ni Elias Paniki	Yes	Yes	
1990	Ayaw Matulog ng Gabi	Yes	Yes	
1993	The Vizconde Massacre: God, Help Us!	Yes	Yes	
1993	The Myrna Diones Story: Lord, Have Mercy!	Yes	Yes	
1993	Humanda Ka Mayor!: Bahala Na ang Diyos	Yes	Yes	
1994	The Cecilia Masagca Story: Antipolo Massacre – Jesus Save Us!	Yes	Yes	
1994	The Maggie dela Riva Story: God... Why Me?	Yes	Yes	
1994	Lipa "Arandia" Massacre: Lord, Deliver Us from Evil	Yes	Yes	
1994	The Untold Story: Vizconde Massacre II – May the Lord Be with Us!	Yes	Yes	
1994	The Annabelle Huggins Story, Ruben Ablaza Tragedy: Mea Culpa	Yes	Yes	
1995	The Lilian Velez Story: Till Death Do Us Part	Yes	Yes	
1995	Victim No. 1: Delia Maga (Jesus, Pray for Us!) – A Massacre in Singapore	Yes	Yes	
1995	Wilson Sorronda: Leader – Kuratong Baleleng's Solid Group	Yes	Yes	
1995	The Marita Gonzaga Rape-Slay: In God We Trust!	Yes	Yes	
1995	Salamat sa Lotto: Linggo-Linggo, Doble-Pasko!	Yes	Yes	
1996	Tirad Pass: The Last Stand of Gen. Gregorio del Pilar	Yes		
1997	Ilaban Mo, Bayan Ko (The Obet Pagdanganan Story)	Yes	Yes	
1998	Hiwaga ng Panday	Yes	Yes	
2003	The Cory Quirino Kidnap: NBI Files	Yes	Yes	
2003	Chavit	Yes	Yes	
2009	Ang Panday	No	story	
2015	Angela Markado	Yes	Yes	
2017	Kamandag ng Droga	Yes		

=== Television ===
- Ang Panday (1986) - RPN
- Pangarap Kong Jackpot (1995-1998, 2010) - PTV/NBN
- Panday (2005) - ABS-CBN
- Bakekang (2006) - GMA Network
- Carlo J. Caparas' Kamandag (2007–08) - GMA Network
- Carlo J. Caparas' Joaquin Bordado (2008) - GMA Network
- Carlo J. Caparas' Tasya Fantasya (2008) - GMA Network
- Gagambino (2008) - GMA Network
- Pieta (2008–09) - ABS-CBN
- Ang Babaeng Hinugot sa Aking Tadyang (2009) - GMA Network
- Totoy Bato (2009) - GMA Network
- Agimat: Ang Mga Alamat ni Ramon Revilla Presents Carlo J. Caparas' Elias Paniki (2010) - ABS-CBN
- Dugong Buhay (2013) - ABS-CBN
- Lumuhod Ka Sa Lupa (2024–25) - TV5
- Totoy Bato (2025–26) - TV5

== Awards ==
In February 2007, during the celebration of National Arts Month, Caparas, along with four posthumously recognised "legends of Philippine komiks," was among seven individuals awarded the Presidential Medals of Merit by President Gloria Macapagal Arroyo in a ceremony held at Malacañang Palace.

In 2008, he received the Sagisag Balagtas Award, which recognises outstanding contributions to Philippine literature in various languages.

=== List of accolades ===
Year	Award-giving body	Category	Nominated work	Result
1980	FAMAS Awards	Best Story	Durugin si Totoy Bato	Won
1984	Film Academy of the Philippines Awards	Best Director	Pieta	Nominated
1985	FAMAS Awards	Best Story	Somewhere	Won
1988	Metro Manila Film Festival	Best Story	Celestina Sanchez, Alyas Bubbles – Enforcer: Ativan Gang	Won
1988	Metro Manila Film Festival	Best Screenplay	Celestina Sanchez, Alyas Bubbles – Enforcer: Ativan Gang	Won
1989	Film Academy of the Philippines Awards	Best Director	Celestina Sanchez, Alyas Bubbles – Enforcer: Ativan Gang	Nominated
1989	Film Academy of the Philippines Awards	Best Original Screenplay	Celestina Sanchez, Alyas Bubbles – Enforcer: Ativan Gang	Won
1989	FAMAS Awards	Best Director	Celestina Sanchez, Alyas Bubbles – Enforcer: Ativan Gang	Nominated
1989	FAMAS Awards	Best Story	Sandakot Na Bala	Won
1995	FAMAS Awards	Best Director	Lipa "Arandia" Massacre: Lord, Deliver Us from Evil	Won
1999	FAMAS Awards	Best Director	Hiwaga ng Panday	Nominated
1999	FAMAS Awards	Best Story	Hiwaga ng Panday	Nominated
2016	FAMAS Awards	Best Director	Angela Markado	Nominated
2016	FAMAS Awards	Best Screenplay	Angela Markado	Nominated
2016	FAMAS Awards	Best Story	Angela Markado	Nominated
