= Steve Gan =

Chinese-born Filipino comics artist (born 1945)

- Born: Santos S. Gan; May 22, 1945 (age 81)
- Areas: Penciller, inker
- Notable works: Panday; Star-Lord; Skull the Slayer

Steve Gan (born May 22, 1945) is a Chinese-born Filipino comics artist. He is best known for co-creating Panday with Carlo J. Caparas and Marvel Comics' Star-Lord and Skull the Slayer.

== Biography ==
Steve Gan was born as Santos S. Gan but changed his first name to "Steve" in admiration of Steve Ditko. Gan studied architecture at the Mapúa Institute of Technology and later worked as an artist in the Komiks industry.

By the 1970s, Gan found work under veteran comic writer Carlo J. Caparas and became instrumental in designing the character that became known as Panday.

It was as Steve Gan that he got a huge break drawing for American comic book publisher Marvel Comics, sending work through his United States-based agent, the Filipino comic book artist Tony DeZuñiga. In 1974, Gan began drawing for Marvel Comics and contributed to their line of black-and-white magazines including Savage Tales and Dracula Lives. He co-created Star-Lord and Skull the Slayer with writers Steve Englehart and Marv Wolfman respectively. Gan was highly regarded for his artwork on both Conan titles Conan the Barbarian and Savage Sword of Conan from 1974 - 1979.

Gan briefly worked for Warren Publishing in the early 1980s. After leaving the comics industry, he became a layout designer and storyboard artist in the animation field. Upon the release of the Guardians of the Galaxy film in 2014, Gan was given both a credit in the movie and royalties for co-creating Star-Lord.

== Personal life ==
Gan is married with three children. He retired from drawing comics fulltime in 2002. He appeared at a convention in 2014 and spoke about leaving the industry 12 years earlier.

== Bibliography ==
=== Pilipino Comics ===
- Ang Panday (1979)

=== Marvel Comics ===
- Conan the Barbarian #58–63 (1976)
- Deadly Hands of Kung Fu #16 (1975)
- Dracula Lives #12–13 (1975)
- Marvel Premiere #28 (1976)
- Marvel Preview #4 (Star-Lord), 19 (Solomon Kane) (1976–1979)
- Savage Sword of Conan #1, 5, 13, 25, 51 (1974–1979)
- Savage Tales #6–9, 11–12 (1974–1975)
- Skull the Slayer #1–3, 6 (1975–1976)
- Tarzan Annual #1 (1977)

=== Warren Publishing ===
- Creepy #122, 134–135 (1980–1982)

Preceded by Mike Ploog	Conan the Barbarian inker 1976	Succeeded by Al Milgrom
