= List of Philippine films of the 1960s =

This is a list of films produced in the Philippines in the 1960s. For an alphabetical list, see Category:Philippine films.

Table key
B/W	Indicates black and white picture	Color	Indicates a color picture sometimes with specific type

Title	Director	Cast	Production company	Genre	Color	Notes
1960
28 de Mayo	Jose de Villa	Van de Leon, Amalia Fuentes, Romeo Vasquez, Rosa Mia, Bella Flores, Naty Santiago, Jose Morelos, Maria Luisa Straight, Riño Isa, Pablo Raymundo	Vera-Perez Productions	Drama	B/W	
7 Amores	Carlos Vander Tolosa, Armando Garces, Tony Cayado, Octavio Silos, Jose de Villa, Conrado Conde, Mar S. Torres	Gloria Romero, Juancho Gutierrez, Mario Montenegro, Rita Gomez, Ric Rodrigo, Lolita Rodriguez, Luis Gonzales, Jean Lopez, Amalia Fuentes, Romeo Vasquez, Marlene Dauden, Greg Martin, Susan Roces, Jose Mari, Dolphy, Barbara Perez, Tito Galla, Wing Duo, Panchito	Sampaguita Pictures	Romance	Color	featuring the Honeymooners-Gloria Romero and Juancho Gutierrez
Akin ang Paghihiganti	Danilo H. Santiago	Efren Reyes, Johnny Monteiro, Leonor Vergara, Aura Aurea, Carol Varga, Ronald Remy, Renato Robles, Vicente Liwanag, Mary Walter, Lito Anzures, Max Alvarado	People's Pictures	Action	B/W	serialized in Bulaklak Magazine
Amy, Susie & Tessie	Tony Cayado	Amalia Fuentes, Susan Roces, Tessie Agana, Juancho Gutierrez, Romeo Vasquez, Jose Mari, Eddie Garcia, Paraluman	Sampaguita Pictures	Comedy, Romance	B/W	
Ang Bahay Na Bato sa Latian	Mario Barri	Cesar Ramirez, Myrna Delgado, Lyn D'amour (Introducing), Oscar Keesee, Martin Marfil, Dely Atay-Atayan, Totoy Torrente, Tony Moquies, Lourdes Yumol, Pedro Faustino, Flor Bien, Blackie Francisco	Hollywood - Far East Productions	Drama, Thriller	B/W	serialized in Tagalog Klasiks
Ang Batang Sirena		Marifi		Fantasy	B/W	
Ang Inyong Lingkod, Gloria Romero	Jose de Villa	Gloria Romero, Mario Montenegro, Ric Rodrigo, Luis Gonzales, Juancho Gutierrez	Sampaguita Pictures	Drama	Color	
Ang Magkakapitbahay	Tony Cayado	Dolphy, Susan Roces, Jose Mari, Rosa Mia, Panchito, Jean Lopez, Horacio Morelos, Venchito Galvez	Vera-Perez Productions	Comedy	B/W	
Awit ng Mga Dukha	Gregorio Fernandez	Gil de Leon, Lilia Dizon, Lourdes Medel, Mila Ocampo, Patria Plata, Johnny Reyes, Rene Roldan	LVN Pictures	Drama	B/W	
Basta Pinoy	Efren Reyes	Efren Reyes, Zaldy Zshornack, Lani Oteyza, Eddie Mesa, Shirley Gorospe, Ruben Rustia, Teroy de Guzman, Mary Walter, Jose Garcia, Paquito Salcedo, Boy Soriano	Premiere Productions	Drama, Musical, Romance	Eastmancolor	
Batingaw	Cesar Gallardo	Cesar Ramirez, Johnny Monteiro, Jose Romulo, Leonor Vergara, Lauro Delgado, Lily Marquez, Jose Garcia, Francisco Cruz, Dencio Padilla, Honesto Los Banos, Pete Yumul, Nina Navarro (Introducing)	Premiere Productions, Inc.	Drama	Color	serialized in Liwayway magazine
Beatnik	Tony Cayado	Dolphy, Eddie Arenas, Susan Roces, Jose Mari, Angie de la Cruz, Nikki Ross, Panchito, Pacita Arana, Rod Navarro, Meldy Corrales, Eddie Gutierrez, Nori Dalisay, Boy Alano, Amparo Lucas, Elizabeth Ramsey, Lito Legaspi, Mitos Seva, Juvy Cachola	Sampaguita Pictures	Comedy, Musical	B/W	
Berdugo	Conrado Conde	Ric Rodrigo, Van de Leon, Marlene Dauden, Daisy Romualdez, Eddie Garcia	Sampaguita Pictures	Action	B/W	serialized in Pilipino Komiks
Bigay Hilig	B.F. Ongpauco	Celia Fuentes, Von Serna, Ernesto Santos, Linda Madrid, Lydia Resma, Jess Medina, Cris Estrella, Nora Nuñez, Mario Escudero, Johnny Long, Honesto Los Baños, Levi Celerio, Batotoy, Lily Campillos, Wellie Ferrer (Introducing), Violeta Lozano (Introducing), Reycard Duet, Rey Ramirez	Everlasting Pictures	Action	B/W	
Bilanggong Birhen	Carlos Vander Tolosa	Amalia Fuentes, Romeo Vasquez, Etang Discher, Rod Navarro, Nori Dalisay, Pacita Arana, Lito Legaspi, Ven Medina, Aring Bautista, Jose Villafranca, Matimtiman Cruz, Santiago Dueñas	Sampaguita Pictures	Drama	B/W	serialized in Espesyal Komiks
Bisaya Man	Nemesio E. Caravana	Zaldy Zshornack, Editha Clomera, Lauro Delgado, Renato Robles, Jose Garcia, Max Alvarado, Domeng del Valle, Poleng Mendoza, Jesus Lapid, Maria Luisa Munoz (Introducing), Arleen del Rio (Introducing), Maria Lourdes Morales, Felisa Salcedo, Candido Manahan, Honesto Los Banos, Eugenio Mojica	People's Pictures, Inc.	Comedy	B/W	serialized in Liwayway magazine
Black Beauty	Susana C. de Guzman	Charito Solis, Bernard Bonnin, Robert Campos, Perla Bautista, Carolina Herranz, Arturo de Castille, Maria Miranda, Priscilla Ramirez, Vicente Alberto, Jessie Baltazar	LVN Pictures	Drama	B/W	serialized in Pilipino Komiks
Botika Sa Baryo	Natoy B. Catindig	Diomedes Maturan, Marita Zobel, Lopito, Patsy, Alfonso Carvajal, Bayani Casimiro, Ric Gutierrez, Arturo de Castille, Carina Afable, Rufina Esperancilla, Tres Rosas	LVN Pictures	Comedy, Musical, Romance	Color	based on a radio drama series over DZRH which was sponsored by Cortal.
Court Martial (Batas Ng Hukbo)	Quin Velasco	Amado Cortez, Myrna Delgado, Oscar Keesee, Paquito Diaz, Lilia Varles, Sepa, Bototoy, Jess Arboleda, A. Alonzo, Auring Velasco (Introducing), Jane Arnold (Introducing)	C&A Movie Productions, Inc.	Drama, War	B/W	
Cuantro Cantos	Felix Villar	Jose Padilla, Jr., Jose Romulo, Amado Cortez, Joseph Estrada, Carmencita Abad, Yolanda Guevarra, Chiquito, Marietta Miranda, Ramon d'Salva, Paquito Diaz, Butch Bautista, Boy Sta. Romana, Nello Nayo, Ric Bustamante, Ely Nakpil, Luis San Juan, Rosie Acosta, Flor Bien, Dencio Padilla, Jesus Lapid, Tony Enriquez, Tony Gamboa, Arsenio Alonzo, Francia Ferrer, Bino Garcia, Guia Gomez (Introducing), Marichu Llora (Introducing)	Larry Santiago Productions, Inc.	Action, Comedy	B/W	serialized in Bulaklak Magazine
Dahlia	Susana C. de Guzman	Nestor de Villa, Charito Solis, Marita Zobel, Robert Campos, Jose Vergara, Johnny Reyes, Perla Bautista, Sonia Velez, Caridad Sanchez, Maria Miranda	LVN Pictures	Crime, Drama, Mystery, Thriller	Color	dramatized over DZXL radio
Dead Or Alive	Alex M. Sunga	Cesar Ramirez, Cecilia Lopez, Lauro Delgado, Miriam Jurado, Quiel Segovia, Lou Salvador, Jr., Jose Garcia, Max Alvarado, Francisco Cruz, Honesto Los Banos, Jesus Lapid, Domeng del Valle, Dencio Padilla, Vic Andaya, Bino Garcia, Johnny Long, Johnny Stuart, Johnny Delgado, Carlos Padilla Jr., Renato Robles, Oscar Roncal, Ruben Rustia, Lito Anzures	Film Makers Productions, Premiere Productions, Inc.	Action	B/W	
Doon Po Sa Amin	Natoy Catindig	Diomedes Maturan, Marita Zobel, Guy Donato, Mila Ocampo, Patsy, Leila Benitez, Bayani Casimiro, Jose Cris Soto, Carina Afable, Noel Villaroman, Boy Saavedra, Saints Trio, Barr Samson, Mervyn Samson, Horace Curry, Pugo, Eddie Ilarde	LVN Pictures	Musical	B/W	Based on the Darigold Jambo Jamboree Program over DZXL Radio.
Double Cross	Conrado Conde	Rita Gomez, Luis Gonzales, Carlos Salazar, Tony Marzan, Martin Marfil, Bella Flores, Charlie Davao, Naty Santiago, Pablo Raymundo, Justina David, Aring Bautista, Jaime Javier, Banding Javier, Luis Castro, Wilfredo Dado, Santiago Duenas	Sampaguita Pictures	Action	B/W	serialized in Espesyal Komiks
Emily	Gregorio Fernandez	Charito Solis, Pancho Magalona, Leroy Salvador, Eddie Rodriguez, Marita Zobel, Merle Tuazon, Patria Plata, Guy Donato, Rey Ruiz, Lina Prieto, Bob del Rosario, Miguel Lopez, Priscilla Ramirez	LVN Pictures	Drama	B/W	
Estela Mondragon	Mar S. Torres	Carmen Rosales, Paraluman, Amalia Fuentes, Tito Galla, Liberty Ilagan, Eddie Gutierrez, Ernesto La Guardia	Sampaguita Pictures	Drama	B/W	serialized in Alimyon and Bulaklak magazines
Gabi Ng Lagim	Larry Santiago, Felix Villar, Tommy C. David, Pablo Santiago	Ramon Revilla, Cecilia Lopez, Myra Crisol, Rodolfo Cristobal, Dely Atay-Atayan, Nello Nayo, Myrna Delgado, Cielito Legaspi, Amado Cortez, Dencio Padilla, Vic Santiago, Jose Romulo, Yolanda Guevarra, Elvira Reyes, Marietta Miranda, Paquito Diaz, Aida Villegas, Fernando Poe Jr., Zaldy Zshornack, Lo' Waist Gang, Chiquito, Berting Labra, Boy Francisco, Paquito Toledo, Tony Cruz, Butch Bautista, Boy Sta. Romana	Larry Santiago Productions, Inc.	Horror	B/W	dramatized over DZRH radio series
Ginang Hukom	Ding M. de Jesus	Rosa Mia, Liberty Ilagan, Eddie Gutierrez, Lito Legaspi, Luis Gonzales, Josephine Estrada (Introducing), Mario Montenegro, Rita Gomez, Lolita Rodriguez, Carlos Salazar, Tony Marzan, Amalia Fuentes, Romeo Vasquez	Sampaguita Pictures	Drama	Color	dramatized over DZRH radio series first film of Josephine Estrada
Ginoong Misteryoso	Segment 3: Johnny Legarda (debut); Story: Jose Miranda Cruz	Danilo Jurado, Cecilia Lopez, Lillian Leonardo, Oscar Moreno, Pedro Faustino, Pugak, Vicente Liwanag, Jose Cris Soto	Tamaraw Productions	Horror	B/W	dramatized over DZAQ radio series
Gumuhong Bantayog	Conrado Conde	Mario Montenegro, Luis Gonzales, Van de Leon, Romeo Vasquez, Eddie Garcia, Barbara Perez, Marlene Dauden, Daisy Romualdez, Venchito Galvez, Nori Dalisay, Amparo Lucas, Aring Bautista, Martin Marfil, Jaime Javier, Totoy Torrente, Marcela Garcia, Lydia Correa, Cora Maceda	Sampaguita Pictures	Drama	B/W	serialized in Pilipino Komiks
Hongkong Honeymoon	Ramon A. Estella	Zaldy Zshornack, Shirley Gorospe, Chiquito, Carol Varga, Celia Rodriguez, Teroy de Guzman, Ruben Rustia, Jose Garcia, Paquito Salcedo, Lita Cristobal, Dencio Padilla, Olivia Recuenco, Pering Veleriano, Tony and Johnny Gosalvez, Danny Boquer, Jose Mari Rocha, Efren Reyes, Virginia Montes, Carmencita Ferrer, Sugar Baba Revue	People's Pictures, Inc.	Romance	B/W	
Huwag Mo Akong Limutin	Gerardo de Leon	Cesar Ramirez, Cynthia Zamora, Aura Aurea, Arsenia Francisco, Oscar Keesee, Ramon d'Salva, Nello Nayo, Danilo Jurado, Max Alvarado, Dadang Ortega, Dina Morales, Jesus Lapid, Domeng del Valle, Robert Arevalo (Introducing)	Premiere Productions	Drama, Thriller	B/W	
Ipagdarasal Kita	Octavio Silos	Ric Rodrigo, Lolita Rodriguez, Luis Gonzales, Marlene Dauden, Rosa Mia, Zeny Zabala, Venchito Galvez, Nenita Navarro, Cesar Reyes, Pablo Raymundo, Maria Luisa Straight, Naty Mallares, Rudy Garcia, Hector Mallares	Sampaguita Pictures	Drama	B/W	dramatized over DZRH radio series
Isinakdal Ko Ang Aking Ama	Armando Garces	Paraluman, Fred Montilla, Amalia Fuentes, Romeo Vasquez, Tito Galla, Liberty Ilagan	Vera-Perez Productions	Drama	B/W	serialized in Alimyon and Bulaklak magazines
Johnny Davao	Larry Santiago, Felix Villar, Tommy C. David, Pablo Santiago	Ramon Revilla, Ben Perez, Tony Santos, Amado Cortez, Joseph Estrada, Chiquito, Berting Labra and the Lo' Waist Gang (Boy Francisco, Paquito Toledo, Tony Cruz, Butch Bautista, Boy Sta. Romana), Jerry Pons, Paquito Diaz, Myrna Delgado, Cecilia Lopez, Cielito Legaspi, Marietta Miranda, Annie Sales, Lito Anzures, Eddie Moya, Elvira Reyes, Luis San Juan, Francisco Cruz, Arsenio Alonzo, Bino Garcia, Vicky Natividad, Tony Enriquez, Angel Buenaventura, Rory Santiago, Zenaida Buena	Larry Santiago Productions, Inc.	Action, Thriller	B/W	dramatized over DZRH radio series
Juan Tamad Goes To Society	Manuel Conde	Manuel Conde, Tessie Quintana, Lita Gutierrez, Adorable Liwanag, Patsy, Liza Moreno, Mila Ocampo, Patria Plata, Jose Vergara, Alfonso Carvajal, Joseph de Cordova, Perla Bautista, Charito Solis, (Cameo Role) and all the other LVN Stars in a cameo role	LVN Pictures	Comedy	B/W	
Kadenang Putik	Cesar Gallardo	Efren Reyes, Alicia Vergel, Leonor Vergara, Bob Soler, Ronald Remy, Lily Marquez, Tessie Quintana, Belen Velasco, Max Alvarado, Dencio Padilla, Eddie Boy Serrano, Danilo Jurado	People's Pictures	Drama, Romance	B/W	serialized in Pilipino Komiks
Kambal Sa Sinukuan	Richard Abelardo	Norma Blancaflor, Celia Fuentes, Jesus 'Og' Ramos, Linda Madrid, Jess Medina, Von Serna, Lydia Resma, Jerry Lopez, Bruno Punzalan, Pedro Faustino, Leonor Ruiz, Johnny Long, Luciano Lazam, Blackie Francisco, Pareng-Pareng, Andres Albo, Frankie Munio, SOS Daredevils, Flor Bien, Mario Escudero, Nora Nunez, Doris Estrella (Introducing)	Everlasting Pictures, Inc.	Adventure, Fantasy	B/W	serialized in Ilang Ilang magazine
Kaming Makasalanan	Mar S. Torres	Eddie Gutierrez (In their first lead role), Liberty Ilagan (In their first lead role), Carmen Rosales, Rita Gomez, Katy de la Cruz, Eddie Garcia, Carlos Salazar, Etang Discher, Bella Flores, Ven Medina, Matimtiman Cruz	Sampaguita Pictures	Drama	B/W	First leading role of Eddie Gutierrez and Libery Ilagan
Katotohanan o Guniguni	Armando de Guzman, Jose Miranda Cruz, Fely Crisostomo, Tommy C. David	Willie Sotelo, Cecilia Lopez, Alfonso Carvajal, Blackie Francisco, Leleng Ubaldo, Jimmy Babiera, Lillian Leonardo, Vicente Liwanag, Dely Villanueuva, Arsenio Almonte, Elisa Mojica, Danilo Jurado, Lilia Dizon, Norma Blancaflor, Bert Olivar, Pedro Faustino, Dadang Otega, Fred Cruzado, Chiquito, Pugak, Dely Atay-Atayan, Chichay, Jose Cris Soto, Patring (Monang) Carvajal, and the Friendly Ghosts	Tamaraw Pictures	Horror	B/W	dramatized over DZAQ radio series
Krus Na Daan	Leroy Salvador	Zaldy Zshornack, Lou Salvador Jr., Bentot, Chiquito, Carmencita Abad, Inday Jalandoni, Mary Walter, Pianing Vidal, Kasupang, Francisco Cruz, Lita Luna, Jesus Lapid, Vic Andaya, Wayne Bryan Jr., Conchita Cruz, Gloria Selga, Ruben Rustia, Joseph de Cordova, Joji Mijares (Introducing), Toto (Introducing)	MP Productions released thru People's Pictures, Inc.	Drama	B/W	
Kung Ako'y Mahal Mo	Gregorio Fernandez	Nestor de Villa, Charito Solis, Bernard Bonnin, Lourdes Medel, Jose Vergara, Perla Bautista, Arturo de Castille, Pabo Zapata, Bella Lopez, May Villarica, Priscilla Ramirez, Horace Curry, Bob Zulueta, Angel Confiado, Rene Roldan, Vic Pacia, Teresa Lucido	LVN Pictures	Crime, Drama, Romance	B/W	
Kuwintas Ng Alaala	Mar S. Torres, Jose de Villa	Paraluman, Oscar Moreno, Mario Montenegro, Luis Gonzales, Susan Roces, Jose Mari, Liberty Ilagan, Rosita Noble, Eddie Gutierrez, Marlene Dauden, Greg Martin, Naty Santiago	Sampaguita Pictures	Drama, Romance	B/W	
Laura	Ding M. de Jesus	Lolita Rodriguez, Luis Gonzales, Jose Mari, Tony Marzan, Liberty Ilagan, Rosita Noble	Sampaguita Pictures	Drama	B/W	dramatized over DZRH radio series sponsored by Colgate-Palmolive Philippines, Inc.
Lawiswis Kawayan	Armando Garces	Gloria Romero, Nestor de Villa, Dolphy, Nikki Ross, Angie de la Cruz, Panchito, Zeny Zabala, Tony Cayado, Lillian Laing, Boy Planas, The 7 Rascals, Maria Luisa Straight	Vera-Perez Productions, Sampaguita Pictures	Romance	Color	
Limang Misteryo Ng Krus	Octavio Silos	Paraluman, Van de Leon, Daisy Romualdez, Tony Marzan, Greg Martin, Mario Montenegro, Rita Gomez, Carmen Rosales, Oscar Moreno, Barbara Perez, Tito Galla, Lolita Rodriguez, Luis Gonzales	Sampaguita Pictures	Drama	B/W	
Lintik Lang Ang Walang Ganti	Jose F. Sibal, Armando de Guzman, Fely Crisostomo, Mario Barri	Eddie del Mar, Amado Cortez, Cecilia Lopez, Aura Aurea, Lyn d'Amour, Jose Romulo, Oscar Keesee, Oscar Obligacion, Vicente Liwanag, Joe Sison, Nello Nayo, Fred Panopio, Rebecca (Introducing)	Hollywood-Far East Productions, Inc.	Action, Comedy, Drama	Color	
Lost Battalion	Eddie Romero	Leopoldo Salcedo, Diane Jergens, Johnny Monteiro, Joe Dennis, Jennings Sturgeon, Joe Sison, Bruce Baxter, Renato Robles, Rosi Acosta, Arsenio Alonzo	Alta Vista Productions, Com Productions, Eddie Romero Productions, Lynro Pictures	Action, Drama, Romance, War	B/W	Released in the US by American International Pictures as Lost Battalion, on a double feature with Guns of the Black Witch in 1962. Passed by the British Board of Film Censors as Lost Battalion on 14 June 1962 with an "A" certificate. UK distributor Anglo Amalgamated used the AIP dubbed version. Although not generally released on the major circuits, Lost Battalion was widely available from 7 October 1962 (at Coventry's Alexandra, etc). Anglo chose this film to support White Slave Ship (1961) at most cinemas.
Lo'Waist Gang Joins The Army	Pablo Santiago	Fernando Poe Jr., Chiquito, Myra Crisol, Amado Cortez, Yolanda Guevarra, Berting Labra, Boy Francisco, Tony Cruz, Butch Bautista, Boy Sta. Romana, Mario Antonio, Rodolfo Cristobal, Marietta Miranda, Paquito Diaz, Nello Nayo, Luis San Juan, Lito Anzures, Francisco Cruz, Johnny Long, Ponching Adriano, Primo Yumol, and Ric Bustamante & his SOS Daredevils	Larry Santiago Productions, Inc.	Action, Comedy	B/W	Sequel to the film Og (1952)
Love At First Sight	Armando Garces	Tessie Agana, Jose Mari, Dolphy, Nikki Ross, Angie de la Cruz, Panchito, Meldy Corrales, Pacita Arana, Mitos Seva, The Bell Boys	Sampaguita Pictures	Romance	B/W	
Lupa Sa Lupa	Mar S. Torres	Gloria Romero, Lolita Rodriguez, Luis Gonzales, Eddie Garcia, Bella Flores, Pablo Guevarra, Priscilla Valdez, Venchito Galvez, Matimtiman Cruz, Boy Alano, Ely Roque	Sampaguita Pictures	Drama	B/W	serialized in Pilipino Komiks
Markado	Mario Barri	Fernando Poe Jr., Lyn D'Amour, Rocky Rogers, Patricia Mijares, Joe Sison, Elvira Reyes, Vicente Liwanag, Martin Marfil, Rosanna Recto, Bert Olivar, Tony Dungan, Flor Bien, Blackie Francisco, Francia Ferrer, Mario Barri, Oscar Keesee, Fred Panopio (Introducing)	Hollywood-Far East Productions, Inc.	Action, Western	B/W	serialized in Kenkoy Komiks
Matandang Pacharming	Artemio Marquez	Leopoldo Salcedo, Ramon Revilla, Myrna Delgado, Chiquito, Marietta Miranda, Paquito Diaz	Larry Santiago Productions, Inc.	Comedy	B/W	
Materiales Fuertes	Efren Reyes	Efren Reyes, Chiquito, Miriam Jurado, Dely Atay-Atayan, Teroy De Guzman, Cameo roles Fernando Poe Jr., Zaldy Zshornack, Cesar Ramirez, Arsenia Francisco, Shirley Gorospe, Cynthia Zamora, Jose Romulo, Leonor Vergara, Johnny Monteiro, Eddie Mesa, Rosemarie Gil, Ronald Remy, Bob Soler, Lily Marquez, Oscar Keesee, Carol Varga, Ruben Rustia, Lito Anzures, Celia Rodriguez, Vicente Liwanag, Renato Robles, Oscar Roncal, Al Quinn	People's Pictures	Comedy	Color	serialized in Diamante Komiks
Mga Bakas Ni Magsaysay	Manuel F. Portillo	The Common Tao/The Filipino Masses, Cesar Ramirez, Tessie Quintana, Venus Portillo, Ludy Carmona, Manuel Barbeyto, Fred Penalosa, Ronnie Manuel, Herman Santiago, Rose Gaerlan, Bernie Manlapig, Rudy Manlapaz, Sonny Diaz, Lydia Galvez (Introducing), Heidi Lei'mour (Introducing), Giging Bermejo	MPM Productions, Inc.	Drama	B/W	
Mga Alamat Ng Sandaigdig	Jose Miranda Cruz, Johnny Legarda, Manuel Silos, Fely Crisostomo	Oscar Moreno, Lilia Dizon, Ben David, Willie Sotelo, Bert Olivar, Pugak, Jose Cris Soto, Chichay, Rita Moreno, Ric Bustamante, Myrna Delgado, Gloria Sevilla, Lilian Leonardo	Tamaraw Productions, Inc.	Horror	B/W	The movie is made up of four episodes of four different stories directed by four film makers
Minerva	B.F. Ongpauco	Celia Fuentes, Jess Medina, Doris Estrella, Ernesto Santos, Lydia Resma, Rebecca Torres, Ben Perez, Martin Marfil, Joe Sison, Ely Nakpil, Blackie Francisco, Nora Nunez, Flor Bien, Johnny Long, Luciano Lasam, Honesto Los Banos (Featuring), Von Serna (Guest Artist), Linda Madrid (Guest Artist), Bill Francisco (Guest Artist), Saints (Guest Artist), Helen Nazario, Hototay (Introducing)	Everlasting Pictures, Inc.	Action, Fantasy	B/W	
Nakausap Ko Ang Diyos	Teodorico C. Santos	Efren Reyes, Olivia Cenizal, Johnny Monteiro, Corazon Rivas, Bob Soler, Ruben Rustia, Belen Velasco, Nello Nayo, Renato Robles, Eddie Boy Serrano, Francisco Cruz, Felisa Salcedo, Jesus Lapid, Dencio Padilla, Henry Rivera, Poleng Mendoza, Tony Bobong, Josephine Sancho (Featuring), Dina Morales (Featuring)	Premiere Productions	Drama	Color	
Navy Blues	F.H. Constantino	Pancho Magalona, Nida Blanca, Luz Valdez, Pugo, Bentot, Guy Donato, Robert Campos, Marietta Sanz, Caridad Sanchez, Bert Olivar, Horace Curry	LVN Pictures	Comedy, Romance	B/W	
Nukso Nang Nukso	Fred Daluz	Pugo, Bentot, Sylvia La Torre, Eddie San Jose, Rosa Aguirre, Nelda Lopez Navarro, Val Castelo, Merle Tuazon	LVN Pictures	Comedy	B/W	
Operesyon Stragglers	Armando de Guzman	Jesus 'Og' Ramos, Cecilia Lopez, Oscar Obligacion, Totoy Torrente, Casmot, Eusebio Gomez, Sonia Reyes, Bert Laforteza, Rita Moreno, Mr. Rafael Yabut	Tamaraw Productions, Inc.	Drama	B/W	
Pagpatak Ng Ulan	Rosa Mia	Gloria Romero, Mario Montenegro, Marlene Dauden, Greg Martin, Eddie Gutierrez	Vera-Perez Productions, Inc.	Drama	B/W	dramatized over DZRH radio
Pagsapit Ng Hatinggabi	Teodorico C. Santos, Cesar Gallardo, Abraham Cruz, Cirio H. Santiago	Edna Luna, Bob Soler, Ramon d'Salva, Elena Mayo, Marilou Muñoz, Francisco Cruz, Ronald Remy, Leonor Vergara, Miriam Jurado, Jose Garcia, Chiquito, Teroy de Guzman, Vicente Liwanag, Menggay, Dely Atay-Atayan, Anna Marie, Paquito Salcedo, Felisa Salcedo, Oscar Roncal, Edita Clomera, Celia Rodriguez, Adorable Liwanag, Johnny Monteiro, Belen Velasco, Lito Anzures, Aida Villegas, Danilo Jurado	Premiere Productions	Horror	B/W	dramatized over DZXL radio
Pakipot	Tony Santos	Mila del Sol, Jaime de la Rosa, Manding Claro, Marita Zobel, Cenon Lagman, Sonia Velez, Maria Paz Lopez, Bobby Vallar, Kulas Kaltas, Menggay, Rosa Rosal, Charito Solis, Eddie Rodriguez, Val Castelo, Bernard Bonnin, Luz Valdez, Hector Reyes, Liza Moreno, Joseph de Cordova	LVN Pictures	Comedy	B/W	
Party Line	Nemesio E. Caravana	Zaldy Zshornack, Lani Oteyza, Lauro Delgado, Editha Clomera, Teroy de Guzman, Oscar Roncal, Josie Sancho, Anna Marie, Dencio Padilla, Edward Gomez, Resty Sandel, Bino Garcia, Blackie Francisco, Honesto Los Banos, Larry Torres, Sevilla Garcia, Rudy Robledo, Rudy Dominguez, Carol Varga	Premiere Productions	Comedy	B/W	
Pautang ng Langit	Cirio H. Santiago	Tessie Quintana, Leonor Vergara, Bob Soler, Eddie Mesa, Carlos Padilla, Jr., Carol Varga, Ramon d'Salva, Miriam Jurado, Africa de la Rosa, Lito Anzures, Danilo Jurado, Felisa Salcedo, Dencio Padilla, Jesus Lapid, Olivia Recuenco, Bino Garcia, Mario David, Anna Marie, Teresita Mendez	Premiere Productions	Action, Drama	B/W	serialized in Tagalog Klasiks
Prinsesa Naranja	Nemesio E. Caravana	Fernando Poe, Jr., Lani Oteyza, Johnny Monteiro, Ronald Remy, Lauro Delgado, Miriam Jurado, Teresita Mendez, Jose Garcia, Max Alvarado, Africa de la Rosa, Mario Escudero, Resty Sandel, Elizabeth Ramsey	Premiere Productions	Drama	Color	serialized in Liwayway magazine
Rancho Grande	Pablo Santiago	Fernando Poe Jr., Berting Labra, Boy Francisco, Paquito Toledo, Butch Bautista, Tony Cruz, Boy Sta. Romana, Jerry Pons, Ben Perez, Oscar Keesee, Jose Garcia, Paquito Diaz, Luis San Juan, Arsenio Alonzo, Ponga, Cleng-Cleng, Pugak, Marichu Llora, Guia Gomez, Jane Palomar, Zenaida Buena, Francia Ferrer, Rosie Acosta, Emily, Vicky Valente, Ely Nakpil, Cleng Cleng Diaz, Arsenio Alonzo, Fred Ramirez, Ponching Adriano, Bino Garcia, Jess Aguila, Nena Divina, Tony Enriquez, Lita Gonzales, Jesus Lapid, Fil Lizarondo, Truping Ocampo, Primo Yumol	Larry Santiago Productions	Action	B/W	
Sa Bawa't Patak ng Dugo	Cesar Gallardo	Cesar Ramirez, Shirley Gorospe, Johnny Monteiro, Jose Romulo, Carlos Padilla Jr., Aura Aurea, Teroy de Guzman, Teresita Mendez, Adorable Liwanag	People's Pictures	Action	B/W	serialized in Bulaklak Magazine
Sa Hardin ng Diyos	Mar S. Torres	Fred Montilla, Juancho Gutierrez, Romeo Vasquez, Tito Galla, Amalia Fuentes, Susan Roces, Barbara Perez, Liberty Ilagan, Eddie Gutierrez, Meldy Corrales, Lito Legaspi, Boy Alano	Vera-Perez Productions, Sampaguita Pictures	Drama	B/W	
Sa Ibabaw ng Aking Bangkay	Cirio H. Santiago	Ronald Remy, Aura Aurea, Carlos Padilla Jr., Quiel Segovia, Carol Varga, Rolando Liwanag, Francisco Cruz, Vic Andaya, Blackie Francisco, Dencio Padilla, Jesus Lapid, Rosa Santos	Premiere Productions	Action, Thriller	B/W	serialized in Liwayway magazine
Sa Mata ng Diyos	Danilo H. Santiago	Tessie Quintana, Leonor Vergara, Carlos Padilla Jr., Lauro Delgado, Aida Villegas, Ramon d'Salva, Elena Mayo, Max Alvarado	People's Pictures	Drama	B/W	dramatized over DZAQ radio
Salamat Po, Doktor	Carlos Vander Tolosa	Lolita Rodriguez, Luis Gonzales, Daisy Romualdez, Carlos Salazar, Tony Marzan, Rosa Mia	Sampaguita Pictures	Drama	B/W	based on a popular radio serial dramatized over DZRH
Sarhento Salcedo	Nemesio E. Caravana	Fernando Poe Jr., Editha Clomera, Carol Varga, Vicente Liwanag, Teroy de Guzman, Oscar Roncal, Max Alvarado, Lito Anzures, Roman Antonio, Anna Marie, Marilou Munoz	Balatbat Productions	Action	B/W	
Si Marita at ang Pitong Duwende	Susana C. de Guzman	Marita Zobel, Robert Campos, Perla Bautista, Rene Ibanez, Caridad Sanchez, Arturo de Castille, Ric Gutierrez, Monang Carvajal, Nora Dy, Pat Salem, Dinky Doo	LVN Pictures	Fantasy	B/W	based on the popular fairytale Snow White and the Seven Dwarfs
Sutlang Bakal	Pablo Santiago	Fernando Poe Jr., Cecilia Lopez, Leroy Salvador, Ben Perez, Oscar Keese, Aida Villegas, Dely Atay-Atayan, Loretta de Lara, Paquito Diaz, Ely Nakpil, Nello Nayo	Larry Santiago Productions	Action	B/W	dramatized over DZAQ radio
Tatlong Magdalena	Armando Garces	Carmen Rosales, Mila del Sol, Rita Gomez, Fred Montilla, Van de Leon, Eddie Garcia	Sampaguita Pictures	Drama	B/W	serialized in Hiwaga Komiks
Tatlong Patak ng Luha	Carlos Vander Tolosa	Ric Rodrigo, Lolita Rodriguez, Carlos Salazar, Greg Martin, Liberty Ilagan, Zeny Zabala, Lito Legaspi, Boy Planas, Ven Medina, Pablo Guevarra, Aring Bautista, Matimtiman Cruz, Ely Roque, Lillian de Leon, Jose Villafranca, Juvy Cachola	Sampaguita Pictures	Drama	B/W	dramatized over DZRH radio station
Teenage Crush	Tony Santos	Tessie Quintana, Eddie Rodriguez, Lita Gutierrez, Manding Claro, Luz Valdez, Marietta Sanz, Nieves Manuel, Mguel Lopez, Fred Panopio, Rene Ibañez, Dracula Boys	LVN Pictures	Romance	B/W	serialized in Tagalog Klasiks comics
The MPD Story (Manila's Finest)	Manuel F. Portillo	Leopoldo Salcedo, Lucy Nola	MPM Productions	Action, Thriller	B/W	
Tres Mosqueteros	Tony Santos	Pancho Magalona, Pugo, Lopito, Bentot, Eddie Rodriguez, Lita Gutierrez, Luz Valdez, Liza Moreno, Jose Vergara, Alfonso Carvajal, Naty Bernardo, Kulas Kaltas, Tony Dantes, Miguel Lopez, Miniong Alvarez, Fred Panopio, Johnny de Leon, Louella Villamor, Dracula Boys	LVN Pictures	Swashbuckler	B/W	
True Confessions	Larry Santiago, Artemio Marquez, Armando de Guzman, Pablo Santiago	Ramon Revilla, Cielito Legaspi, Jose Romulo, Yolanda Guevarra, Rodolfo Cristobal, Nello Nayo, Edna Luna, Amado Cortez, Marietta Miranda, Oscar Keesee, Rosie Acosta, Jose Padilla Jr., Joseph Estrada, Loreta de Lara, Ben Perez, Marichu Llora, Fernando Poe Jr., Berting Labra, Chiquito, Paquito Toledo, Boy Francisco, Butch Bautista, Boy Sta. Romana, Tony Cruz, Jerry Pons, Guia Gomez, Zenaida Buena, Francia Ferrer	Larry Santiago Productions	Drama	B/W	dramatized over DZRH radio station
Unos sa Laot	Susana C. de Guzman	Nestor de Villa, Charito Solis, Bernard Bonnin, Lourdes Medel, Rey Ruiz, Lina Prieto, Sonia Velez	LVN Pictures	Drama	Color	adapted from a PMC radio serial dramatized over DZRH radio station
Viuda de Oro	Nemesio E. Caravana, Gerardo de Leon, Ramon A. Estella, Cesar Gallardo, Efren Reyes, Danilo Santiago, Teodorico C. Santos	Olivia Cenizal, Edna Luna, Ronald Remy, Jose Romulo, Nello Nayo, Eddie Mesa, Johnny Monteiro, Leonor Vergara, Bob Soler, Teresita Mendez, Vicente Liwanag, Jose Garcia, Fernando Poe Jr., Lauro Delgado, Lani Oteyza, Cesar Ramirez, Cynthia Zamora, Chiquito, Ruben Rustia, Efren Reyes, Arsenia Francisco, Miriam Jurado, Lito Anzures, Zaldy Zshornack, Shirley Gorospe, Oscar Roncal, Celia Rodriguez	Premiere Productions	Drama	B/W	dramatized on DZXL radio station
Wala Kang Kapantay	Teodorico C. Santos	Nestor de Villa, Olivia Cenizal, Jose Romulo, Adorable Liwanag, Jose Garcia, Menggay, Josie Sancho, Carmen Zobel, Lily Marquez	Premiere Productions	Drama	B/W	serialized in Bulaklak Magazine
Walang Daigdig	Pablo Santiago	Fernando Poe Jr., Zaldy Zshornack, Cielito Legaspi, Ben Perez, Rodolfo Cristobal, Ramon Revilla, Oscar Keesee, Loreta de Lara, Nello Nayo, Aida Villegas, Paquito Diaz, Elvira Reyes, Dely Atay-Atayan, Francisco Cruz, Johnny Long, Boy Soriano, Tony Montes, Dely Villanueva, Alex de Leon, Bino Garcia, Dencio Padilla, Armando Araneta, Vicente Santiago, Violeta Mayo, Terry Gonzales	Larry Santiago Productions, Poe-Zshornack Productions	Action	B/W	dramatized over DZAQ radio station
Walang Pangalan	Fred Daluz	Lilia Dizon, Bernard Bonnin, Lourdes Medel, Hector Reyes, Robert Campos, Rosa Aguirre, Joseph de Cordova, Gerry Gabaldon, Bella Lopez	LVN Pictures	Romance	B/W	serialized in Hiwaga Komiks
Yantok Mindoro	Fred Daluz	Pugo, Sylvia La Torre, Eddie San Jose, Bentot, Rosa Aguirre, Val Castelo, Merle Tuazon, Nelda Lopez Navarro, Ric Tierro	LVN Pictures	Comedy	B/W	
1961
Ako'y Alipin ng Opio	Efren Reyes	Efren Reyes, Johnny Monteiro, Eddie Mesa	Premiere Productions	Drama		
Alyas Sakay	Ding M. de Jesus	Mario Montenegro, Gloria Romero, Fred Montilla	Sampaguita Pictures	Action		
Baril sa Baril	Ding M. de Jesus	Fernando Poe Jr., Joseph Estrada, Dencio Padilla, Isabelle Lopez	Tagalog Ilang-Ilang Productions	Action		
Mother Dearest	Mar S. Torres					
Noli Me Tángere	Gerardo de León	Eduardo del Mar, Edita Vital, Johnny Monteiro, Oscar Keesee, Teody Belarmino, Leopoldo Salcedo, Ramon d'Salva, Ruben Rustia, Max Alvarado, Nello Nayo	Arriva-Bayanihan Productions	Period drama		
Outside The Kulambo						
Pitong Gabi sa Paris	Eddie Romero	Nida Blanca, Nestor De Villa, Eddie Romero		Romantic drama		
Sandata at Pangako	F.H. Constantino	Fernando Poe Jr., Charito Solis	LVN Pictures	Action, Crime, Drama, Mystery	B/W	
1962
The Big Broadcast	Tony Cayado	Dolphy, Panchito, Amalia Fuentes	Sampaguita Pictures	Musical		First Filipino feature film in full Technicolor.
Falcon	Danilo Santiago	Zaldy Zshornack, Charito Solis	People's Pictures	Action		
El filibusterismo	Gerardo de León	Pancho Magalona, Charito Solis, Teody Belarmino, Edita Vital, Ben Perez, Carlos Padilla Jr., Lourdes Medel, Robert Arevalo, Oscar Keesee, Ramon D'Salva	Arriva-Bayanihan Productions	Period drama		
The Princess and I	Shigeo Tanaka	Shigeo Tanaka	Charito Solis, Kojiro Hongo	Action, Romance	Eastmancolor	Japanese-Filipino co-production
Target 1-1-1	Eddie Romero	Leopoldo Salcedo, Michael Parsons, Efren Reyes, Sr., Jennings Sturgeon, Eddie Mesa	Independent International Pictures, Hemisphere Pictures, Lynro, Manhattan Productions	War, Drama		
Samar	George Montgomery	George Montgomery, Gilbert Roland, Ziva Rodann, Joan O'Brien, Nico Minardos	Warner Bros., MAM & Winchester	Adventure	Technicolor	
1963
The Big Show	Larry Santiago; Pablo Santiago; Efren Reyes	Chiquito, Joseph Estrada, Helen Gamboa, Eddie Mesa, Mario Montenegro, Fernando Poe Jr., Reycard Duet, Ruben Rustia, Lucita Soriano		Anthology		
Ang Babaeng Isputnik	Efren Reyes	Nida Blanca, Tony Ferrer, Max Alvarado, Pepe Pimentel, Jess Lapid	Tagalog Ilang-Ilang Productions	Superhero		
Death Was a Stranger	Lamberto V. Avellana	Ronald Remy, Willie Sotelo, Tony Fortich, Leroy Salvador, Lalaine Bennett	Hunters' ROTC Association	War		
Si Darna at ang Impakta	Danilo H. Santiago	Liza Moreno, Gina Alonzo, José Padilla Jr., Carlos Salazar, Daisy Romualdez	People's Pictures	Superhero		
Isputnik vs. Darna	Natoy B. Catindig	Nida Blanca, Liza Moreno, Tony Ferrer, Arnold Mendoza, Mila Montañez	Tagalog Ilang-Ilang Productions	Superhero		
Si Juan Tamad at si Juan Masipag sa Pulitikang Walang Hanggan	Manuel Conde	Manuel Conde, Tessie Quintana, Sylvia Gumabao, Rosa Aguirre, Alfonso Carvajal	Zultana International	Political comedy		
MPD Solves the Robbery Ax-Murder Case	Artemio Marquez		Ambassador Productions	Documentary		
Sigaw ng Digmaan	Efren Reyes	Fernando Poe Jr., Jose Romulo, Bob Soler, Berting Labra, Carlos Padilla Jr., Lou Salvador Jr., Lauro Delgado, Tony Ferrer, Max Alvarado, Paquito Diaz	FPJ Productions	War		
1964
Ging	Cirio H. Santiago, Teodorico C. Santos	Vilma Santos, José Padilla, Jr.	People's Pictures	Drama		
Pinoy Beatles	Artemio Marquez	Zaldy Zshornack, Chiquito, Manding Claro	Ambassador Productions	Comedy, Musical		
Guerillas in Pink Lace	George Montgomery	George Montgomery	Mont Productions	War, Comedy		
Moro Witch Doctor	Eddie Romero	Jock Mahoney, Margia Dean	Associated Producers (API)	Action, Drama		
The Walls of Hell	Gerardo de León, Eddie Romero	Fernando Poe, Jr., Jock Mahoney	Hemisphere Pictures	War, Drama		
1965
Alyas Batman at Robin	Paquito Toledo	Bob Soler, Lou Salvador Jr., Nova Villa, Marion Douglas, Oscar Keesee, Nello Nayo, Pablo Virtuoso, Joe Garcia, Mary Walter, Angel Buenaventura	D'Lanor Productions	Superhero		
Captain Philippines at Boy Pinoy	Paquito Toledo	Bob Soler, Lou Salvador Jr., Nova Villa, Marion Douglas, Nello Nayo, Pablo Virtuoso, Jose Garcia, Mary Walter, Angelo Ventura, Resty Sandel	D'Lanor Productions	Superhero		
Ang Daigdig Ko'y Ikaw	Efren Reyes	Fernando Poe Jr., Susan Roces, Oscar Keesee, Dencio Padilla, Pablo Virtuoso, Lito Anzures, Victor Bravo, Vic Varrion, Rudy Meyer, Philip Coo	FPJ Productions	Romantic comedy		
Ang Daigdig ng Mga Api	Gerardo de León	Barbara Perez, Robert Arevalo, Ben Perez, Oscar Keesee, Dely Villanueva, Manny Ojeda, Mona Del Cielo, Ruben Ilagan, Francisco Cruz, Quiel Mendoza	Cinemasters	Biographical drama		
G-2: Taga-usig ng Kaaway	Eddie Garcia	Tony Ferrer, Alberto Alonzo, Divina Valencia, Bessie Barredo, Menchu Morelli, Max Alvarado, Rod Navarro, Victor Bravo, Manolo Robles, Rocco Montalban	Broadway Pictures	Spy		First installment of the Agent X-44 series
Iginuhit ng Tadhana: The Ferdinand E. Marcos Story	Mar S. Torres; Jose de Villa; Conrado Conde	Luis Gonzales, Rosa Mia, Gloria Romero, Bongbong Marcos, Vilma Santos, Chona, Tony Cayado, Ven Medina, Venchito Galvez, Jose Morelos	Sampaguita Pictures	Biographical drama	B/W	
Only the Brave Know Hell	Eddie Romero	John Saxon, Fernando Poe Jr., Bronwyn FitzSimons, Robert Arevalo, Jose Dagumboy, Vic Diaz, Michael Parsons, Kristina Scott, Vic Silayan, Ann Saxon	Hemisphere Pictures	Action, War		Filipino-American co-production
Pilipinas Kong Mahal	Efren Reyes	Fernando Poe Jr., Susan Roces, Nova Villa, Oscar Keesee, Vic Silayan, Lito Anzures, Mary Walter, Vic Uematsu, Francisco Cruz, Miguel Lopez	FPJ Productions	Drama		
1966
Alyas Popeye	Herminio Bautista	Dolphy, Panchito, Imelda Ilanan	Emar Pictures	Action		
Ang Haragan	Efren Reyes	Fernando Poe Jr., Liza Moreno	RTG Productions	Action		
The Passionate Strangers	Eddie Romero	Michael Parsons, Mario Montenegro		Drama		
Zamboanga	Efren Reyes	Fernando Poe Jr., Susan Roces, Johnny Monteiro		Adventure, drama, romance		
1967
Because of a Flower	Luis Nepomuceno	Charito Solis		Drama		
Ex-Convict	Efren Reyes	Fernando Poe Jr.		Action		
The Longest Hundred Miles	Don Weis	Doug McClure, Katharine Ross, Ricardo Montalbán	Universal Television	War	Color	American/Filipino coproduction; Made-for-TV
1968
Alyas 1-2-3	Efren Reyes	Fernando Poe Jr., Paquito Diaz, Lito Anzures, Victor Bravo, Pablo Virtuoso, Dencio Padilla, Manolo Robles, Vic Varrion, Mario Escudero, Resty Sandel	FPJ Productions	Action	B/W	
Brides of Blood	Eddie Romero; Gerardo de Leon	John Ashley, Kent Taylor, Beverly Hills, Eva Darren, Mario Montenegro		Horror		
Manila, Open City	Eddie Romero	Charito Solis, James Shigeta		War		
Ang Mangliligpit	Pablo Santiago	Fernando Poe Jr.		Action, drama, war		
1969
Ang Ninong Kong Nazareno	Augusto Buenaventura	Joseph Estrada, George Estregan, Mary Ann Murphy, Paquito Diaz		Action, family		
Perlas ng Silanganan	Pablo Santiago	Fernando Poe Jr., Susan Roces		Drama, history		
Mu-Muu Fiesta	Pablo Santiago	Eddie Mesa, Helen Gamboa, Jimmy Morato, Norma Ledesma		Music		
