= Eastwood City Walk of Fame =

Hall of fame in Quezon City, Philippines

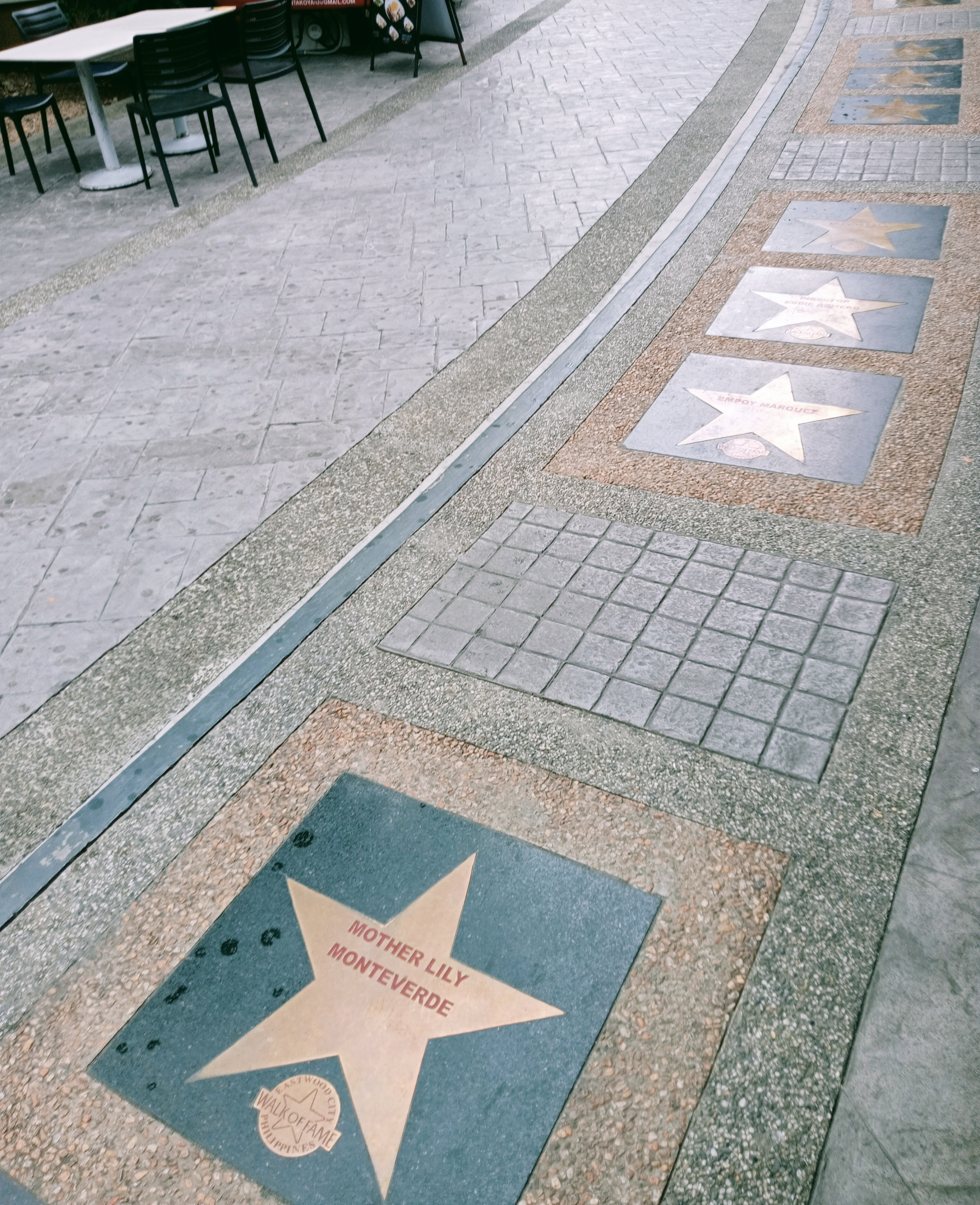
- Sponsored by: Established by: German Moreno, GMA Artist Center, (2005–2016); Joey Abacan, GMA Network (2007–2010); Annette Gozon-Valdes, GMA New Media (2007–2013); Federico Moreno (2016–present)
- Date: December 1, 2005
- Location: Eastwood City, Quezon City
- Country: Philippines
- Presented by: GMA Network
- Rewards: Brass star and bronze plaque embedded into the sidewalk along Eastwood City
- First award: 2005

The Eastwood City Walk of Fame or the Walk of Fame Philippines is a walk of fame patterned after the Hollywood Walk of Fame, and is located in Eastwood City, Quezon City. It was founded on December 1, 2005, by talent manager German Moreno. Moreno's employer, GMA Network, is the official media partner of the Walk of Fame since 2005.

== History ==
The Walk of Fame Philippines project almost failed to launch due to lack of budget and connection; fortunately the Head of MOWELFUND Miss Boots Anson-Roa during that time, recommended to German Moreno to support the project by using his connection to the artists of the Philippines show business, being tagged as the Mr. Showman himself and was launched in 2005. The unveiling of stars happen every December. Stars were awarded twice a year from 2006 until 2008 and from 2013 to 2014. The Walk of Fame is a project of the German Moreno Walk of Fame Foundation (formerly the Walk of Fame Gallery and Museum), a non-profit organization founded by the late German Moreno, which the expense is from his own pocket. Entrepreneur Alice Eduardo joined him as co-owner in 2013.

Following Moreno's death on January 8, 2016, Megaworld Corporation Senior Associate Vice President and Head for Marketing Tefel Pesigan-Valentino and Quezon City Mayor Herbert Bautista announced that they will continue the Walk of Fame as part of the "City of Stars" project, which was approved by the city's local government in 2014. In February 2016, it was announced that Moreno's son, Federico will become Walk of Fame's president and general manager.

== Criteria ==
From its inception in 2005 until 2015, there are no clear criteria for the stars to be immortalized in the Philippine version of walk of fame. Names are handpicked by German Moreno. Moreno, at times, has claimed inductees are picked not by request of the inductee but by the person's popularity and contribution to the Philippine entertainment industry and in some cases based on a person's contribution to the Philippines. This was changed in 2016 when his son Federico Moreno took over as president and general manager, where the list of inductees, similar to the Hollywood Walk of Fame, are being selected by the German Moreno Walk of Fame Foundation's Selection Committee into six categories: Film, Television, News and Public Affairs, Radio, Music and Theater. A seventh category, Social Media, was added in 2020.

== Criticism ==
The Walk of Fame Philippines in Eastwood has been criticised for honoring actors based primarily on fame, for inducting actors who are yet to contribute greatly in the entertainment industry and for including foreigners earlier than the locals.

== Inductees ==
As of March 2024, 390 names have been inducted into the Walk of Fame. These inductees include actors, hosts, writers, directors and producers of movies, television and theater; singers, songwriters and musicians; news anchors and reporters; radio personalities; athletes; social media personalities and notable achievers.

=== December 2005 ===
- Sharon Cuneta
- Fernando Poe Jr. (posthumous)
- Susan Roces
- Joseph Estrada
- Vilma Santos
- Nora Aunor
- Gloria Romero
- Dolphy
- Eddie Garcia
- Ramon Revilla Sr.
- Rosa del Rosario
- Atang de la Rama (posthumous)
- Rogelio dela Rosa (posthumous)
- Carmen Rosales (posthumous)
- Fernando Poe Sr. (posthumous)
- Nida Blanca (posthumous)
- Leopoldo Salcedo (posthumous)
- Amalia Fuentes
- Tita Duran (posthumous)
- Pancho Magalona (posthumous)
- Nestor de Villa (posthumous)
- Katy de la Cruz (posthumous)

=== January 2006 ===
- Christopher de Leon
- Lilia Dizon
- Hilda Koronel
- Pilita Corrales
- Delia Razon
- Anita Linda
- Jose Mari Gonzales
- Tony Santos Sr. (posthumous)
- Mario Montenegro (posthumous)
- Boots Anson-Roa
- Lolita Rodriguez
- Oscar Moreno (posthumous)
- Barbara Perez
- José Padilla (posthumous)
- Rosa Rosal
- Fred Montilla (posthumous)
- Armando Goyena
- Charito Solis (posthumous)
- Eddie Rodriguez (posthumous)
- Efren Reyes Sr. (posthumous)

=== December 2006 ===
- Tessie Agana
- Boy Alano
- Bong Revilla
- Lito Lapid
- Eddie Gutierrez
- Lea Salonga
- Manny Pacquiao
- Judy Ann Santos
- Jinggoy Estrada
- Ruffa Gutierrez
- Richard Gomez
- Cesar Montano
- Zsa Zsa Padilla
- Robin Padilla
- Paraluman
- Cesar Ramirez (posthumous)
- Manuel Conde (posthumous)
- Phillip Salvador
- Jaime dela Rosa (posthumous)
- Chiquito (posthumous)
- Aga Muhlach
- Mona Lisa
- Rudy Fernandez
- Gloria Diaz
- Maricel Soriano
- Lorna Tolentino
- Alicia Vergel (posthumous)
- Marlene Dauden
- Zaldy Zshornack (posthumous)
- Tessie Quintana (posthumous)
- Edna Luna (posthumous)
- Vic Vargas (posthumous)
- Romeo Vasquez

=== January 2007 ===
- Billy Crawford

=== December 2007 ===
- Charo Santos-Concio
- Gina Pareño
- Kris Aquino
- Kuh Ledesma
- Regine Velasquez
- Piolo Pascual
- Richard Gutierrez
- Snooky Serna
- Gary Valenciano
- Martin Nievera
- Vina Morales
- Mila del Sol
- Celia Rodriguez
- Juancho Gutierrez (posthumous)

=== June 2008 ===
- Eddie Mesa
- Rosemarie Gil
- Oscar Obligacion
- Linda Estrella
- Sylvia La Torre
- Rudy Concepcion (posthumous)
- Rosario Moreno (posthumous)

=== December 2008 ===
- Gina Alajar
- Helen Gamboa
- Albert Martinez
- Dawn Zulueta
- Herbert Bautista
- Dina Bonnevie
- Tirso Cruz III
- Dulce
- Claudine Barretto
- Marian Rivera
- Dingdong Dantes
- Dindo Fernando (posthumous)

=== December 2009 ===
- John Lloyd Cruz
- Sarah Geronimo
- Armida Siguion-Reyna
- Ogie Alcasid
- Janno Gibbs
- Jolina Magdangal
- Francis Magalona (posthumous)
- Michael V.
- Aiza Seguerra
- Gabby Concepcion
- Christian Bautista
- Jed Madela
- KC Concepcion
- Cherry Pie Picache
- Yul Servo
- Isko Moreno
- Jaclyn Jose
- Nonito Donaire
- APO Hiking Society
- Rey Valera
- Basil Valdez
- Rico J. Puno
- Hajji Alejandro
- Marky Cielo (posthumous)
- Jackie Lou Blanco
- Ricky Davao
- Luis Gonzales
- Dingdong Avanzado
- Niño Muhlach
- Jose Mari Chan

=== December 2010 ===
- Tito Sotto
- Vic Sotto
- Joey de Leon
- Sheryl Cruz
- Manilyn Reynes
- Coco Martin
- Paeng Nepomuceno
- Jericho Rosales
- Mel Tiangco
- Mike Enriquez
- Noli de Castro
- Korina Sanchez
- Imelda Papin
- Claire dela Fuente
- Eva Eugenio
- Norma Blancaflor (posthumous)
- Johnny Delgado (posthumous)
- Julie Vega (posthumous)
- Janice de Belen
- Bella Flores
- Diether Ocampo
- Charice Pempengco
- Freddie Aguilar
- Che Che Lazaro
- Boy Abunda
- Divina Valencia
- Perla Bautista
- Lani Mercado
- Ronnie Ricketts
- Jacky Woo

=== December 2011 ===
- Luz Valdez
- Marita Zobel
- Liberty Ilagan
- Robert Arevalo
- Rustica Carpio
- Caridad Sanchez
- Elizabeth Ramsey
- Coney Reyes
- Gloria Sevilla
- Pilar Pilapil
- Ai-Ai delas Alas
- Eugene Domingo
- Angel Locsin
- Anne Curtis
- Carmina Villarroel
- Iza Calzado
- Carla Abellana
- Lovi Poe
- Rhian Ramos
- Marvin Agustin
- Sam Milby
- Heart Evangelista
- Joey Albert
- Celeste Legaspi
- Cocoy Laurel
- Jessica Soho
- Tina Monzon-Palma
- Paquito Diaz (posthumous)
- Inday Badiday (posthumous)
- Helen Vela (posthumous)
- AJ Perez (posthumous)
- Ike Lozada (posthumous)
- Miko Sotto (posthumous)

=== December 2012 ===
- Marilou Diaz-Abaya (posthumous)
- Rosa Mia (posthumous)
- Leroy Salvador (posthumous)
- Angelo Castro, Jr. (posthumous)
- Carlo J. Caparas
- Ricky Reyes
- Al Quinn
- Lucy Torres-Gomez
- Anthony Castelo
- Lani Misalucha
- Ricky Lo
- Arnold Clavio
- Bea Alonzo
- Amy Austria
- Rio Locsin
- Nova Villa
- Ronaldo Valdez
- Jean Garcia
- Alma Moreno
- Alfred Vargas
- Jessica Sanchez
- Ara Mina
- Jessa Zaragoza
- Roderick Paulate
- ER Ejercito
- Gretchen Barretto
- Pops Fernandez
- Dennis Trillo

=== April 2013 ===
- David Pomeranz

=== December 2013 ===
- German Moreno
- Alice Eduardo
- Armi Kuusela
- Aurora Pijuan
- Bembol Roco
- Edgar Mortiz
- Gemma Cruz
- Gladys Reyes
- Jamie Rivera
- Joel Torre
- Joel Cruz
- Precious Lara Quigaman
- Laurice Guillen
- Toni Gonzaga
- Megan Young
- Wing Duo
- Manding Claro
- Dr. Manny Calayan
- Dr. Pie Calayan
- Margie Moran
- Melanie Marquez
- Rob Schneider
- Anderson Cooper
- Stella Marquez
- TJ Trinidad
- Vicky Morales
- Paul Walker (posthumous)
- Justin Bieber

=== April 2014 ===
- Rose Fostanes
- Robert Lopez
- Michael Christian Martinez
- Nanding Josef

=== December 2014 ===
- Vice Ganda
- Kathryn Bernardo
- Daniel Padilla
- Yen Santos
- Daisy Romualdez
- Lisa Macuja-Elizalde
- Angelito Nepomuceno
- Jestoni Alarcon
- Tony Ferrer
- Sylvia Sanchez
- Evangeline Pascual
- Tom Rodriguez
- Lito Legaspi
- Carmi Martin
- Jaya
- Aiko Melendez
- Allan K.
- Angel Aquino
- Luis Gabriel Moreno
- Willie Revillame
- Cory Quirino
- Chanda Romero
- Dante Rivero
- Joel Lamangan

=== December 2015 ===
Coinciding with the 10th anniversary of Walk of Fame Philippines.

- Alden Richards
- Maine Mendoza
- Jose Manalo
- Wally Bayola
- Paolo Ballesteros
- Alice Dixson
- Rocco Nacino
- Eula Valdez
- Julie Anne San Jose
- Sunshine Dizon
- Camille Prats
- Jake Vargas
- Randy Santiago
- Mark Bautista
- Enrique Gil
- Sam Concepcion
- Dindi Gallardo
- Herminio "Butch" Bautista
- Kara David
- Gerphil Flores
- Buboy Villar
- Jason Abalos
- The Company

=== December 2016 ===
- John Arcilla
- Jennylyn Mercado
- Angelica Panganiban
- Jodi Sta. Maria
- Shaina Magdayao
- Barbie Forteza
- Ted Failon
- Luchi Cruz-Valdes
- Susan Enriquez
- Eddie Ilarde
- Manolo Favis
- Pepe Smith
- Willy Cruz
- Zenaida Amador (posthumous)

=== November 2017 ===
- Atom Araullo
- Solenn Heussaff
- Kris Bernal
- Parokya ni Edgar
- Jake Zyrus
- Empoy Marquez
- Lily Monteverde
- Matteo Guidicelli
- Mely Tagasa
- Joe D' Mango
- Freddie Santos
- Karen Davila
- Anthony Taberna
- Tulfo Brothers (Mon, Ben, Erwin, Raffy)
- Isabel Granada (posthumous)
- Joe Taruc (posthumous)
- Chichay (posthumous)
- Emmanuel Borlaza (posthumous)
- Eddie Romero (posthumous)

=== December 2018 ===
- Marichu Vera Perez-Maceda
- Dr. Jose Perez (posthumous)
- Julia Barretto
- Chito S. Roño
- Derek Ramsay
- James Reid
- Pia Wurtzbach
- Vhong Navarro
- Ken Chan
- Rico Hizon
- Bernadette Sembrano

=== January 2020 ===
Film

- Edu Manzano

Music

- Nanette Inventor

News and Public Affairs

- Jiggy Manicad

Radio

- Jun Banaag

Social Media

- Alex Gonzaga

Television

- Kim Atienza
- Catriona Gray
- Jo Koy

Theater

- Rachelle Ann Go

=== January 2023 ===
Film

- Ricky Lee

Music

- Janet Basco

News and Public Affairs

- Mario Dumaual

Radio

- Gerry Baja

Social Media

- Ranz Kyle
- Niana Guerrero

Sports

- Hidilyn Diaz

Television

- Maja Salvador

Theater

- Tony Mabesa (posthumous)

=== March 2024 ===
Film

- Baron Geisler
- Brillante Mendoza
- Tony Y. Reyes
- Vic del Rosario

Music

- Rivermaya
- The Dawn

News and Public Affairs

- Cathy Yap-Yang
- Lhar Santiago

Radio

- Joel Reyes-Zobel

Social Media

- Small Laude

Television

- Felipe Gozon
- Belle Mariano
- Donny Pangilinan
- Johnny Manahan
- Luis Manzano
- Michelle Dee
- Richard Yap
- Sanya Lopez
- Wilson Y. Tieng

Theater

- Menchu Lauchengco-Yulo

== Gallery ==
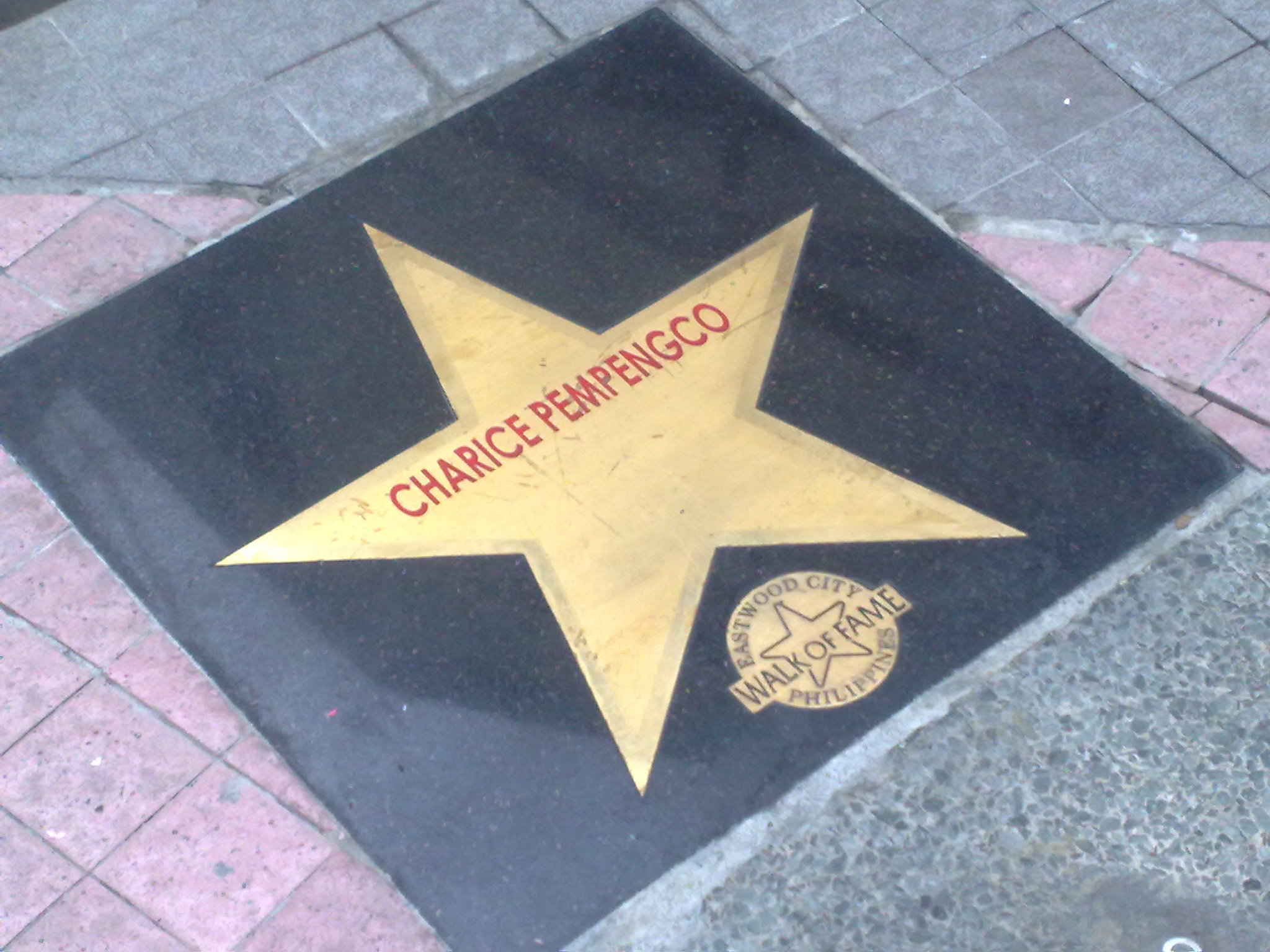
Charice Pempengco's star

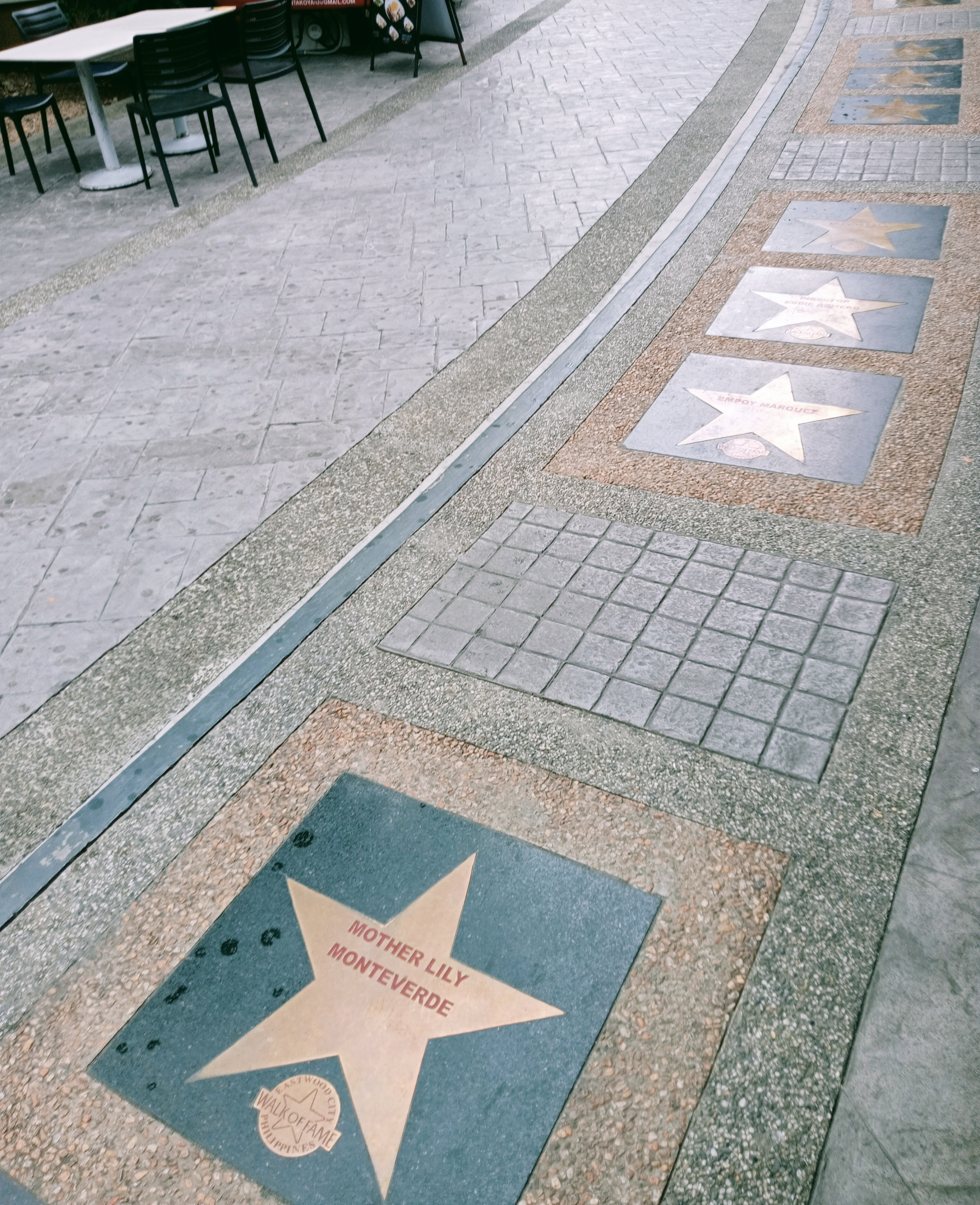
Mother Lily Monteverde's star

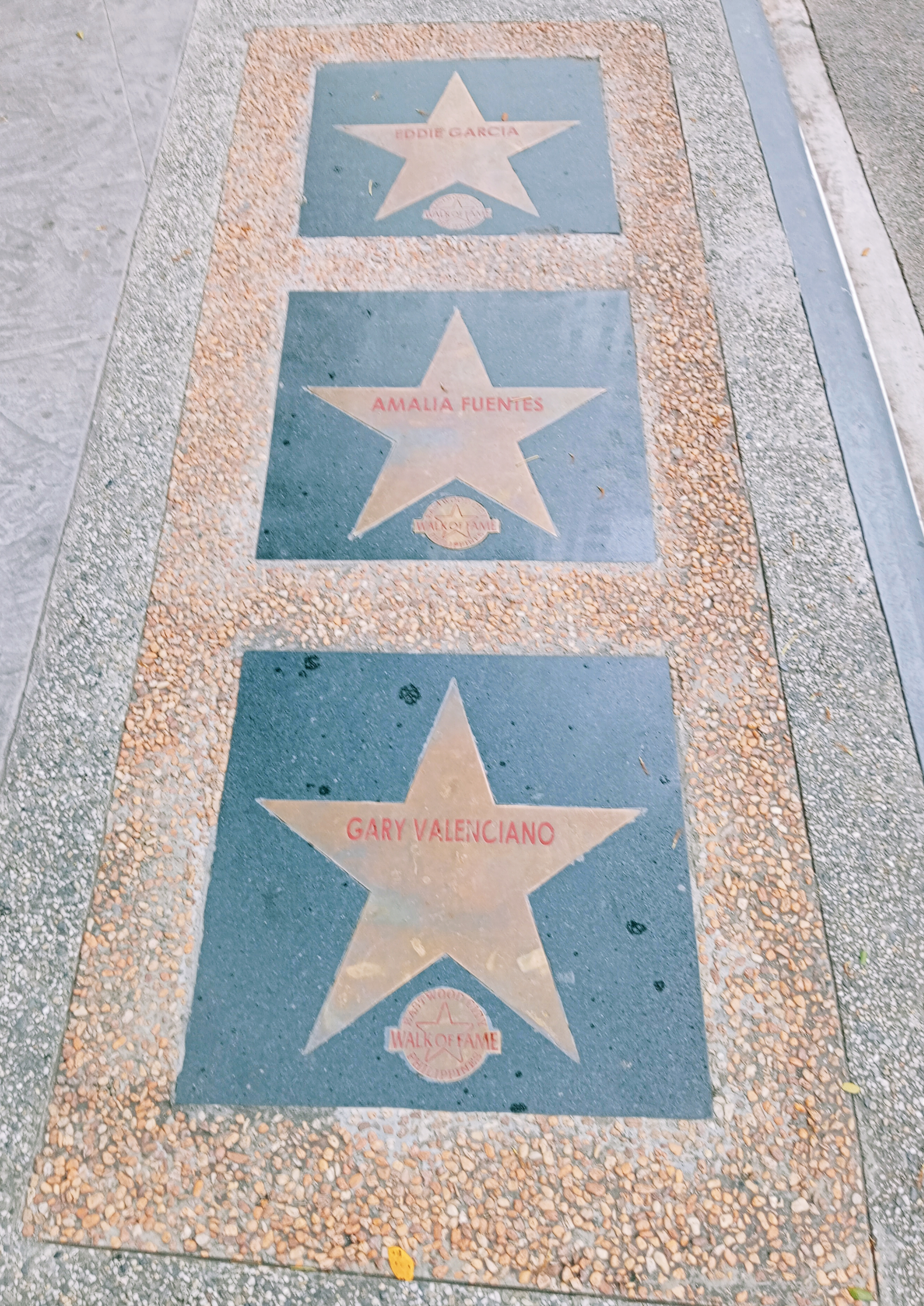
Stars of Gary Valenciano, Amalia Fuentes, and Eddie Garcia

== See also ==
- Hollywood Walk of Fame, Los Angeles
- Canada's Walk of Fame, Toronto
- Avenue of Stars, Hong Kong
- Paseo de las Luminarias, Mexico City
- List of halls and walks of fame
