= Jose Romulo =

Filipino actor

- Born: Romulo Alib Zuño; 11 October 1931; Rosario, Batangas, Philippines
- Died: 5 August 2015 (aged 83); Parañaque City, Philippines
- Other names: "The First Brown Adonis"
- Occupation: Actor
- Years active: 1950s–1960s
- Notable work: DI-13, El Jugador, Pandora, Gabi ng Lagim
- Spouse: Lydia
- Children: 5

Jose Romulo (born Romulo Alib Zuño; October 11, 1931 – August 5, 2015) was a Filipino actor, active in Philippine cinema during the 1950s. He was nicknamed the "brown Adonis" of Philippine film.

== Early life and career ==
Romulo was born on October 11, 1931, in Rosario, Batangas, Philippines. Before entering the entertainment industry, he served as a police officer in his hometown. He was discovered by Premiere Productions.Romulo's acting was inspired by Leopoldo Salcedo.

== Film career ==
Jose Romulo made his breakthrough as the lead actor in DI-13, a movie based on a popular serialized komiks novel about a fictional police detective. Over the course of his career, he appeared in nearly 200 films, often playing leading roles during the 1950s.

Filmography
Year	Title	Role
2000	Tumbador	Amigo
1998	Armadong Hudas	Roman Reyes
1997	Isinakdal Ko Ang Aking Ina	Gustavo
1997	Eseng ng Tondo	
1995	Pulis Probinsya II	Maj. Enriquez
1994	Ikaw Lamang, Wala Nang Iba	
1994	NBI: Epimaco Velasco, the True Story	Putik's Man
1993	Gaano Kita Kamahal	Rolly's Father
1993	Manila Boy	Col. Quinzon
1993	Alejandro 'Diablo' Malubay	Maj. Barreto
1993	Gascon... Bala ang Katapat Mo	
1992	Warden	Daniel
1992	Andres Manambit: Angkan ng Matatapang	Chief
1992	Amang Capulong - Anak ng Tondo II	Maj. Valdez
1992	Bad Boy II	Police Chief
1992	Alyas Lakay	
1991	Mayor Latigo	Ka Omeng
1991	Moro	Rashid Lucman
1991	Kumukulong Dugo	Col. Mirasol
1991	Hepe: ...Isasabay Kita sa Paglubog ng Araw	Rivera
1991	Boyong Mañalac: Hoodlum Terminator	Malapon P, Chief
1991	Takas sa Impiyerno	Chief
1990	May Isang Tsuper ng Taxi	
1990	Huling Lalaki sa Bitayan	Tata Betoy
1990	The Smokey Mountain	
1990	Mula Paa Hanggang Ulo	Hepe
1990	Sa Diyos Lang Ako Susuko	
1989	Binuhay Mo Ako Ngayon, Papatayin Kita Bukas!	
1989	Boots Oyson: Sa Katawan Mo ... Aagos Ang Dugo!	Amando
1989	Pamilya Banal	Emong
1989	Hindi Pahuhuli ng Buhay	Kumander Acosta
1989	Maria Luisa Brigade: The Beginning	
1989	Alyas: Boy Life	Gusting Daga
1989	Tadtarin ng Bala Si Madelo	
1988	Aguilar, May Oras Ka Rin	
1988	One Day, Isang Araw	
1988	Ang Supremo	
1988	Buy One, Take One	Police Chief
1988	Ex-Army	Kumander Tala
1988	Alyas Pusa: Ang Taong May 13 Buhay	
1987	Aguila at Falcon	
1987	Kapag Puno Na Ang Salop	
1987	Boy Tornado	Kid Amante's Trainer
1987	Sparrow Unit: The Termination Squad	
1987	Feliciano Luces: Alyas Kumander Toothpick, Mindanao	
1987	Balweg	Macli-ing Dulag
1987	Di Bale Na Lang	Emong (uncredited)
1987	Batas sa Aking Kamay	
1987	Operation: Get Victor Corpuz, the Rebel Soldier	
1986	Dalagita	
1986	Payaso	
1986	Pepe Saclao: Public Enemy No. 1	Pepe's elder brother
1986	Agaw Armas	Mang Canor
1986	Batang Quiapo	Major Corrales
1986	Anak ng Supremo	
1985	Victor Lopez Jr. (Robinhood ng Tondo)	
1985	Sangley Point Robbery	Hepe
1985	Isa-Isa Lang!	Mr. Moreno
1985	Escort Girls	Gigi's father
1985	Mission Order: Hulihin si ... Avelino Bagsic ang Rebelde	
1984	Huwag Kang Papatay	Mayor Alcaraz
1984	Sigaw ng Katarungan	Badong
1984	Pasukuin Si Waway	
1983	Lintik Lang Ang Walang Ganti	
1983	Kapag Buhay Ang Inutang	Celso
1983	Gamu-gamo sa Pugad Lawin	Pilo
1982	Daniel Bartolo ng Sapang Bato	
1982	Kumander .45	
1982	Classified Operation	Jose Romulus
1982	Get My Son Dead or Alive	
1981	Pagbabalik ng Panday	Ama ng mga Taong Lawin
1981	Bandido sa Sapang Bato	Ka Pepeng
1981	Ang Maestro	
1981	Geronimo	
1981	Laya	
1981	Shoot the Killer	
1980	Ang Agila at ang Falcon	
1980	Leon ng Central Luzon	
1979	Ang Lihim ng Guadalupe	
1979	Dobol Dribol	
1979	Isa Para sa Lahat, Lahat Para sa Isa	
1978	Salonga	
1978	Mercenario	
1978	Joe Quintero	Ponso
1978	Kumander Ulupong	
1978	Malabanan: Kilabot Hunter ng Cavite	
1978	Blood Run	
1978	Ang Lalaki... Ang Alamat... Ang Baril	
1977	Bontoc	
1977	Bianong Bulag: One-Eyed Terror of Cavite	
1976	Bongbong	Luis
1976	Mapang-akit... ang Dilim ng Gabi!	
1976	Alakdang Gubat	
1976	Bergado, Terror of Cavite	
1975	Huwag Mo Akong Paandaran	
1975	Niño Valiente	
1975	Dugo at Pag-ibig sa Kapirasong Lupa	Mulong (uncredited)
1975	Hit and Run	Kapitan
1975	Walang Duwag sa Kayumanggi	
1975	Dugo ng Tarikan	
1974	South Seas	
1974	Kill RP Nine-O	
1973	Dugo ng Bayan	
1973	Sto. Cristo	
1973	Batang Bicol	
1972	Superbeast	Vigo
1972	Rio Tigre	
1972	The Hot Box	Crao
1972	Mga Ligaw ng Punglo	
1972	Viva Zaldo	
1971	Asedillo	
1971	Basta't Basketball	
1971	Adios Mi Amor	
1970	San Diego	
1970	The Man from A.N.K.L.A.	
1969	Ikaw ang Lahat sa Akin	
1969	Ginintuang Kamay	
1969	The Gunman	
1969	Batang Matadero	
1968	Tatak: Sacramentados	
1968	Mine Hunter	
1968	Barbaro Cristobal	
1968	Ang Mangliligpit	
1967	Marko Asintado	
1967	Ex-Convict	
1967	Bravados	
1967	Metrocom	
1966	Hanggang May Buhay	
1966	Estranghero sa Sapang Bato	
1966	Wanted: Johnny L	
1966	Swanie	
1966	Sarhento Aguila at ang 9 na Magigiting	
1966	Pistolero	
1966	Ang Haragan	
1966	Dakilang Balatkayo	
1965	Lady Killer	
1965	Bandido Aguilar	
1965	Darmo Solo	
1965	Dugo sa Pantalan	
1965	Ang Mga Sandatahan	
1965	Maginoong Tulisan	
1964	Scout Rangers	
1964	Saan Mang Sulok ng Daigdig	
1964	9 Laban sa Lahat	
1963	12 Kuba	Hunchback
1963	Sigaw ng Digmaan	
1963	Sa Iyo O Sa Akin	
1963	Ang Tatay Kong Kalbo	
1963	Limang Kidlat	
1963	The Big Show	
1962	Tatak Mondragon	
1962	Ang Nabubuhay Sa Patalim	
1962	Baliw O Martir	
1962	Sakdalista	
1962	Mapusok na Paghihiganti	
1962	4 Valientes	
1961	Bangkay Kaming Hahakbangan	
1961	Presinto 13: Sa Lahat ng Dako	
1961	Nagsasalitang Kalansay	
1961	Viva Caballeras	
1961	Divina, Diyosa ng Apoy	
1960	Wala Kang Kapantay	
1960	Lintik Lang ang Walang Ganti	
1960	True Confessions	
1960	Cuatro Cantos	
1960	Viuda de Oro	
1960	Gabi ng Lagim	
1960	Batingaw	
1960	Materiales Fuertes	
1959	Bigtime Berto	Berto's victim
1959	Ultimatum	
1958	4 na Pulubi	
1958	Bon Voyage	
1958	Mr. Basketball	
1958	Obra Maestra	
1958	Mga Liham kay Tiya Dely	
1957	Wala Nang Luha	
1957	Familia Alvarado	
1957	Sweethearts	
1957	Bicol Express	
1957	Barumbado	
1956	Exzur	
1956	Lalo Kitang Mahal	
1956	Prinsipe Villarba	
1956	Apat na Kasaysayang Ginto	
1956	Santa Lucia	
1955	Dakilang Hudas	
1955	Unang Halik	
1955	El Jugador	
1955	Pandora	
1955	Ha Cha Cha	
1955	El Conde de Monte Carlo	
1955	Adventures of DI-13	DI-13
1954	Abenturera	
1954	Laging May Umaga	
1954	Paladin	
1954	Salabusab	
1952	Ang Sawa sa Lumang Simboryo	Isagani

=== Freelance work ===
In the 1960s, Romulo transitioned to freelance acting and frequently collaborated with FPJ Productions, owned by actor Fernando Poe Jr. One of his notable performances in this period was in the film Lakay, where he took on a significant supporting role.

== Personal life ==
Jose Romulo was married to Lydia, with whom he had five children: Rey, Rizaldy, Marivic, Carmen, and Richmond. His daughter Marivic recalled her father as a generous and loving parent who often entertained his family with stories about the movie industry.

== Death ==
On August 5, 2015, Romulo died at the age of 83 due to pneumonia resulting from complications of diabetes. He died at Parañaque Doctors Hospital in Parañaque City. His nephew, Nestor Cuartero, a journalist for Tempo and the Manila Bulletin, remembered him as "a gentleman of the old school" and "a true actor."

Romulo's interment took place on August 9, 2015, at Loyola Memorial Park in Sucat, Parañaque City.

== Legacy ==
Jose Romulo is remembered as the "brown Adonis" of Philippine cinema.
