= Out of the Tiger's Mouth =

1962 film

- Directed by: Tim Whelan, Jr.
- Written by: Tim Whelan, Jr. Wesley Ruggles
- Produced by: Wesley Ruggles
- Starring: Loretta Han-Yi Hwong
- Cinematography: Emmanuel I. Rojas
- Edited by: Jack Ruggiero
- Release date: 1962
- Running time: 78 minutes
- Country: United States
- Language: English
- Budget: $89,000

Out of the Tiger's Mouth is a 1962 American drama film directed by Tim Whelan Jr. It was entered into the 12th Berlin International Film Festival.

== Cast ==
- Loretta Han-Yi Hwong as Little Moon
- David Fang as Peaceful
- Lilian Wai as Grandma Yang
- Y'ang Juo Ch'ing as Mme. Pang
- Mario Barri as Mario
- Lolita Shek as Su Mei
- Ngai Fung as Boatman Feng (as Fung Yi)
- Victoria Chan as Beggar girl

== See also ==
- List of American films of 1962
