= Ang Daigdig Ko'y Ikaw =

1965 Filipino film directed by Efren Reyes Sr.

- Theatrical release poster
- Directed by: Efren Reyes
- Screenplay by: Fred Navarro
- Story by: Efren Reyes
- Produced by: FPJ
- Starring: Fernando Poe Jr.; Susan Roces
- Cinematography: Sergio Lobo
- Edited by: Augusto Salvador
- Music by: Tony Maiquez
- Production company: FPJ Productions
- Distributed by: FPJ Productions
- Release date: April 25, 1965
- Running time: 122 minutes
- Country: Philippines
- Language: Filipino

Ang Daigdig Ko'y Ikaw (lit. 'You Are My World') is 1965 Philippine romantic comedy film co-written and directed by Efren Reyes and starring Fernando Poe Jr. and Susan Roces. The film is FPJ Productions' 3rd anniversary offering and features the then freelancer Roces in her first assignment since leaving Sampaguita Pictures. The film was the first of 17 pictures Poe and Roces would make together and was the beginning of their real life relationship, which would culminate in their marriage three years later. In celebration of the said marriage, the film was re-released to theatres in 1968 which contained footage of the couple's actual marriage ceremony.

== Plot ==
Vicky is the spoiled heiress of a multi-millionaire, while Roman is the president and truck driver of Roman's Trucking Corporation. In rebelling against her father's wishes, Vicky and Roman's paths will cross as they journey from Batangas to Baguio, and along the way get to know each other and fall in love with one another.

== Synopsis ==
Vicky (Susan Roces) is Don Enrique Larrazabal's (Oscar Keesee) spoiled unica hija and the sole heir to the Larrazabal fortune. Don Enrique locked up Vicky aboard a yacht in order to prevent her from eloping with Daniel, whom he objects to because of his questionable character. While anchored in Batangas, and taking advantage of Don Enrique being out on the shore, Vicky swims to the nearest shore.

There she meets Roman (Fernando Poe Jr.) who owns a trucking business of which he is also the driver. She stows away in Roman's truck and upon being discovered, she lies to Roman about her life - fabricating a lie wherein she is an orphan who is being forced by an aunt to be married off to a rich old man whom she doesn't have feelings for. Roman takes her in on the condition that she would work for him.

On their delivery from Batangas all the way to Baguio, Roman and Vicky gets to know each other and starts to become intimate with one another. Along the way, Vicky constantly hides from Don Enrique's men, who has been ordered by the elder Larrazabal to retrieve Vicky.

Upon arriving in Baguio, Roman discovers the true identity of Vicky and is deeply hurt that Vicky had lied to him. Unbeknownst to Vicky, Daniel is also in Baguio and that revelation led Roman to think that Vicky had played with his emotions only to run-off with Daniel as soon as they arrive in Baguio. Dejected, Roman parts ways with Vicky. Don Enrique then confronted Roman and was impressed with his character that he approved of him for Vicky despite Roman not being rich.

With Don Enrique's blessing, Vicky returns to Roman, who is all too willing to take her back into his arms.

== Cast ==
- Fernando Poe Jr. as Roman
- Susan Roces as Vicky Larrazabal
- Oscar Keesee as Don Enrique Larrazabal
- Dencio Padilla as Dencio
- Pablo Virtuoso as Pablo
- Lito Anzures
- Victor Bravo
- Vic Varrion
- Rudy Meyer
- Philip Coo
- Marilou Murray
- Mario Escudero
- Esther Vuzconde
- Romy Nario
- Restie Sandel
- Angel Buenaventura
- Jose Paulo

== Music ==
The song "Ang Daigdig Ko'y Ikaw" was written especially for the film with music from Tony Maiquez and lyrics from Levi Celerio and Efren Reyes. The song was performed by Ric Manrique Jr. and Pilita Corrales.
