= Anak ni Palaris =

1955 Filipino film directed by Mario Barri

- Theatrical film poster
- Directed by: Mario Barri
- Produced by: Fernando Poe Productions
- Starring: Fernando Poe Jr.; Rosita Noble
- Distributed by: Deegar Cinema Inc.
- Release date: January 2, 1955
- Running time: 88 minutes
- Country: Philippines
- Language: Filipino

Anak ni Palaris (transl. Child of Palaris) is a 1955 action film directed by Mario Barri and starring Fernando Poe Jr. The film marks Poe's screen debut. It is a sequel to Palaris (1941) and Awit ni Palaris (1946).

== Cast ==
- Fernando Poe, Jr.
- Rosita Noble
- Mario Escudero
- Ramon D'Salva
- Ruben Rustia
- Purita Alma
- Pedro Faustino
- Cecilio Joaquin
