= Lakay =

1992 Filipino film starring Fernando Poe Jr.

- Directed by: Nilo Saez
- Screenplay by: Jose Carreon
- Story by: P/Col Juanito Garcia Lagasca
- Starring: Fernando Poe Jr.; Charo Santos; Rina Reyes; Efren Reyes Jr.
- Cinematography: Ver Reyes
- Edited by: Rene Tala; Ever Ramos
- Music by: Jaime Fabregas
- Production company: GP Films
- Release date: November 4, 1992
- Country: Philippines
- Language: Filipino

Lakay (subtitled A True to Life Story of P/Col Juanito Lagasca) is a 1992 Filipino action film directed by Nilo Saez, written by Jose Carreon, and starring Fernando Poe Jr. as the titular police colonel. It also stars Charo Santos, Rina Reyes, Efren Reyes Jr., Jose Romulo, Philip Gamboa, Romy Diaz, Madel Locsin, Flexi Sarte, and Fredmoore De Los Santos. Produced by GP Films, the film was released on November 4, 1992.

== Cast ==
- Fernando Poe Jr. as P/Col. Juanito "Lakay" Garcia Lagasca, Sr.
- Charo Santos as Violeta Bruno Lagasca
- Rina Reyes
- Efren Reyes Jr. as Leonardo "Waway" Delos Reyes
- Fredmoore De Los Santos as Juanito Voltaire Bruno Lagasca, Jr.
- Flexi Sarte as Jennifer Bruno Lagasca
- Jose Romulo
- Philip Gamboa
- Romy Diaz
- Madel Locsin
- Ernie David
- Ronnie Olivar
- Avel Monado
- Efren Belardo
- Bert Garon
- Buddy Dator
- Rene Hawkins
- Danny Riel
- Jess Vargas
- Tirso Mediavillo
- Mario Cavero
- Renato Tanchinco
- Lucita Soriano
- Odette Khan
- Marithez Samson
- Naty Santiago
- Ramon D Salva as Congressman
- Berting Labra
- Rommel Valdez
- Vic Varrion
- Eddie Arenas
- Michael Murray
- Nanding Fernandez
- Ernie Ortega
- Hermino "Butch" Bautista
- Alfred Salta
- Jimmy Reyes
- Bebeng Amora
- Cris Daluz
- Ernie Forte
- Nemie Gutierrez
- Tony Tacorda
- Nonoy De Guzman
- Johnny Vicar

== Production ==
"Ronnie [Poe] is my only choice. Not only because he happens to be the long-time movie king and my favorite actor, but more of his screen impact. I believe Ronnie truly projects a man of principles, a fearless fighter of the oppressed which I fought for when I was active in service.

— Juanito Lagasca

Retired officer Juanito Lagasca gave his approval to a film adaptation of his story once George Pascual of GP Films assured that Fernando Poe Jr. was cast in his role.

== Release ==
Lakay was released in the Philippines on November 4, 1992.
