= Jess Lapid =

Filipino actor

- Born: Jesus Songco Lapid; October 5, 1933; Guagua, Pampanga, Philippine Islands
- Died: July 13, 1968 (aged 34); Quezon City, Philippines
- Other name: JLS
- Occupation: Actor
- Years active: 1958–1968
- Spouse: Bella Flake
- Children: 3 (including Jess Jr.)
- Relatives: Lito Lapid (nephew); Ysabel Ortega (grandniece)

Jesus Songco Lapid (October 5, 1933 – July 13, 1968) was a Filipino actor and father of actor, diving instructor, and fight director Jess Lapid Jr. He was given the movie screen name Jess Lapid. His older brother is Jose Lapid, father of Lito Lapid.

He was fatally shot inside a nightclub in Quezon City on July 13, 1968.

== Early life ==
Jesus Songco Lapid was born on October 5, 1933, in Guagua, Pampanga,. His older brother, Jose, is the father and grandfather of movie stars-turned politicians Lito Lapid (now a Senator), and his son is Mark Lapid (former governor of Pampanga and now TIEZA Head). Jess started as a grip for Premiere Productions. He then became an extra for Premiere Productions, and shifted to being a stuntman after finding out that they were paid more.

== Career ==
Jesus Songco Lapid was a stuntman of Premiere, often doubling for more established stars. His stunts included riding horses, falling from cliffs, and getting shot at by villains. He doubled for action movie star Fernando Poe Jr., which eventually led to a close friendship.

In May 1960, during a visit to Cebu City, Lapid managed to shield fellow actor Zaldy Zshornack from knife-wielding assailants, receiving three stab wounds in his right arm while Zshornack fired two warning shots to scare away the assailants.

When Poe ventured into film productions, he made Jess one of the regulars in his films, giving him roles that required real acting, rather than choreographed stunt actions. Jess rose to the occasion and proved to be a convincing character actor. Poe tried him out in Pasong Diablo, in 1961. It was then in the FPJ Productions, Sierra Madre (1963) that Poe decided to give Jess the full star treatment from a more prominent billing to major publicity exposures.

It was Tagalog Ilang-Ilang Productions picked him up and eventually made him into a superstar in the movie “Kardong Kidlat” (1964) which became such a smashing success at the box office tills. At the Globe Theater where the movie was launched, a long queue of movie fans lined up around the building just to get in and watch the talk-of-the-town film.

1964 proved to be a bright and busy year for Jess, appearing in films like Bilis at Tapang with Romeo Vasquez and Vendetta Brothers with Joseph Estrada and Eddie Garcia. He co-starred with Vic Vargas in “7 Kilabot ng Barilan”. In 1966, he got to team up with Gloria Romero in the film Batang Muntinglupa, which would be the only movie they did together. The film also starred a young Jay Ilagan. In 1968, Jess appeared alongside Poe Jr. and Estrada in “3 Hari”, an FPJ productions offering.

As he was raking it in, he invested in his own film outfit, Jela Productions, and began producing his own movies.

== Personal life ==
Of his 3 children, one went on to follow in his footsteps. His namesake, Jess Lapid Jr. also became a movie actor, and a film and fight director, and also now currently a scuba diving instructor. He appeared in a 1980 spin-off film that made his father famous, Ang Bagong Kardong Kidlat. Jess Jr. capped his career with a Best Supporting Actor award for the movie “Lumayo Ka Man Sa Akin” in 1993.

== Filmography ==
=== Film ===
Year	Title	Role
1958	Laban sa Lahat	Jesus Lapid
1959	Ang Kanyang Kamahalan	
1959	Tough Guy	
1960	Krus Na Daan	
1960	Huwag Mo Akong Limutin	
1960	Cuatro Cantos	
1961	The Flash Elorde Story	
1961	Baril sa Baril	
1962	Mga Trigreng Taga-Bukid	
1962	Batang Maynila	
1962	Kambal Na Baril	
1962	Pitong Kabanalan ng Isang Makasalanan	
1962	Markang Rehas	
1962	Suicide Commandoes	
1962	Dead or Alive	
1962	Cuatro Condenados	
1962	Asiong Meets Alembong	
1963	Limang Kidlat	
1963	Kung Gabi sa Maynila	
1963	Ang Babaeng Isputnik	
1963	Isputnik vs. Darna	
1963	Kung Hindi Ka Susuko ...!	
1963	Sierra Madre	
1963	Ang Sangano at Colegiala	
1963	Tres Kantos	
1963	Sigaw ng Digmaan	
1963	Patapon	
1963	Ito ang Maynila	
1964	Labo-Labo	
1964	Kardong Kidlat	Kardong Kidlat
1964	Bilis at Tapang	
1964	Deadly Brothers	
1965	Ito ang Mga Lalaki	
1965	Black Jack	Hari
1965	Tatlo sa Tatlo	
1965	Labanang Lalake	
1965	Guillermo Bravado	Guillermo Bravado
1966	Batang Muntinlupa	
1966	Soliman Brothers	
1966	San Bernardo	
1966	Katapat ng Bawat Lakas	
1966	Huling Baraha	
1966	Pistolero	Pistolero
1967	Vagabond	
1967	Umpisahan Mo at Tatapusin Ko!	
1967	The Mark of Kardo	
1967	Operation Impossible	
1967	Marko Asintado	
1967	Kidlat Meets Gringo	
1967	Kardong Kaliwa	
1967	Barako	He-Man
1967	Ang Limbas at ang Lawin	
1967	Alamat ng 7 Kilabot	
1967	Sibad	
1968	Tatlong Hari	
1968	Cuadro de Jack	
1968	Zaragoza	Zaragoza
1968	Valiente Brothers	
1968	Simarron Brothers	
1968	Raton Ariel	Raton Ariel
1968	Leon Guerrero: Laban sa 7 Kilabot	Leon Guerrero
1968	Killer Patrol	
1968	Kardong Pusa	Kardo the Catman
1968	Journey to Hell: The Lucky 9 Commandos	
1968	3 Kilabot sa Barilan	Kardong Kidlat
1973	Fandong Asintado	

== Death and legacy ==
After wrapping up the movie Simaron Brothers with Jun Aristorenas, on the night of 13 July 1968, Lapid Sr. was shot to death at the Lanai Nightclub after an altercation between two groups of movie personalities. Jess was brought to the National Orthopedic Hospital but was pronounced dead on arrival. He was 34 years old. Persistent reports linked the incident to another Kapampangan actress, Nancy Roman, also his leading lady. A suspect, Mario Henson, gave himself up to the police, and at least one gunman from Angeles City was implicated in the crime.

A public viewing of his body was held at the Santo Cristo Chapel, then his body was brought to his hometown on July 13, 1968. His was buried at Guagua Cemetery in Pampanga.

Simaron Brothers was shown posthumously at the Globe Theater, and the blurb capitalized on his sensational death by touting his last movie as a “picture that will project the living image of Jess Lapid in the hearts of millions..”.

As a belated tribute, his nephew Lito Lapid appeared as Jess Lapid in the biopic The Jess Lapid Story, released in 1978. He also immortalized the iconic role of Leon Guerrero, first originated by Jess in the 1968 film, “Leon Guerrero: Laban sa 7 Kilabot”.

Lapid Sr. is regarded as one of the stunt performers who transitioned to leading roles in action films, alongside actors such as Lito Lapid, Fernando Poe Jr., Dante Varona and Baldo Marro. He is associated with the action film genre during his era.

== In popular culture ==
- He was portrayed by his nephew, Lito Lapid, in the 1978 biopic film The Jess Lapid Story
- He was portrayed by his son, Jess Lapid Jr., in the 1994 film Epimaco Velasco: NBI.
