= Mario Dumaual =

Filipino writer and journalist (1958–2023)

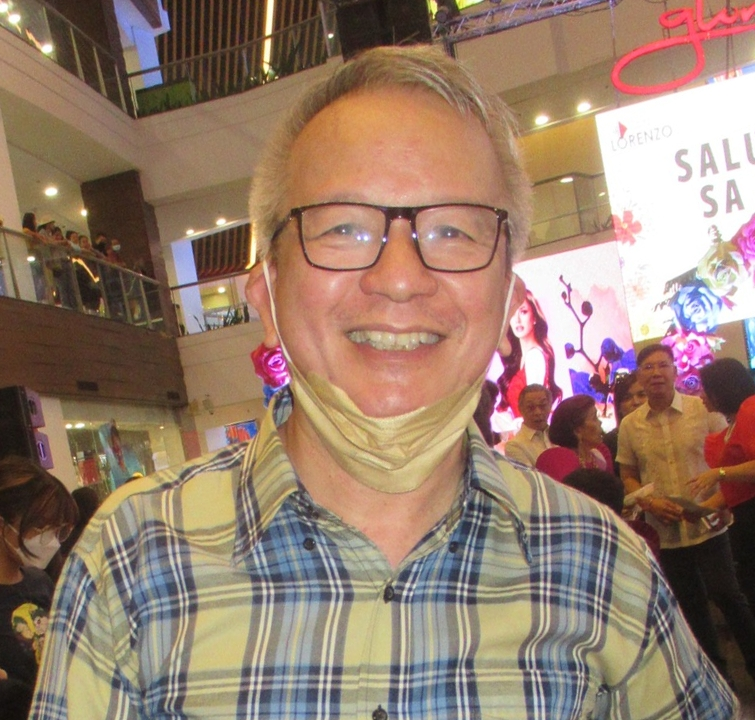
- Dumaual in 2023
- Born: Mario Velasquez Dumaual; July 31, 1958; Naga, Camarines Sur, Philippines
- Died: July 5, 2023 (aged 64); Quezon City, Philippines
- Resting place: Loyola Memorial Park, Marikina, Philippines
- Education: University of the Philippines Los Baños
- Occupation(s): Writer, entertainment journalist
- Years active: 1982–2023
- Employer: ABS-CBN
- Agent: ABS-CBN Corporation (1988–2023)
- Spouse: Cherie Pamittan (m. 1987)
- Children: 5
- Awards: Eastwood City Walk of Fame, Joe Quirino Memorial Award

Mario Velasquez Dumaual (locally [ˈmaɾjo duˈmawɐl]; July 31, 1958 – July 5, 2023) was a Filipino writer and journalist, best known as an entertainment reporter for ABS-CBN News and Current Affairs.

== Education and personal life ==
Dumaual studied at the University of the Philippines Los Baños, where he served as a campus journalist, specializing in sports. He graduated in 1975.

Dumaual married Cherie Pamittan in 1987. They had five children (including son and ABS-CBN News reporter Miguel Dumaual) and three grandchildren.

== Career ==
Dumaual started his career as a staff writer for the Ministry of Agriculture. Later, he worked at a financing company and then a shipping company.

In 1982, he was hired by the Times Journal as their entertainment reporter, where he was assigned to cover the Manila International Film Festival.

While working as a columnist for the newspaper Malaya, Angelique Lazo (entertainment anchor of the flagship news program TV Patrol) offered him a job at ABS-CBN.

Dumaual was honored with a star at the Eastwood City Walk of Fame, in recognition of his contributions to the Philippine entertainment industry.

== Illness and death ==
On June 5, 2023, he suffered a heart attack and was confined at the Philippine Heart Center in Quezon City. During his confinement, it was discovered that he was also suffering from a severe fungal infection.

A month later, he died due to septic shock on July 5, at the age of 64. His death was announced in a statement released by his family. He was buried on July 9 at the Loyola Memorial Park in Marikina.

== Filmography ==
=== Television ===
| Year | Title | Notes | Ref(s) |
|---|---|---|---|
| 1988–2023 | TV Patrol | Reporter | |
| 1998–2010 | The Correspondents | Reporter | |
| 2009–2011 | SNN: Showbiz News Ngayon | Reporter | |
| 2013–2016 | Biyaheng Retro | Host | |
| 2016 | Magandang Buhay | Guest, with Miguel Dumaual | |

== Awards ==
- Joe Quirino Memorial Award, 5th Entertainment Editors’ Choice Awards - presented by the Society of Philippine Entertainment Editors (2022)
- Eastwood City Walk of Fame (2023)
