= Mario Barri =

Filipino actor (1928–1963)

- Born: 1928
- Died: 21 November 1963 (aged 34–35)

Mario Barri (1928 – 21 November 1963) was a Filipino actor and film director.

== Life and career ==
Barri appeared in his first movie with Lebran Pictures, called Song of Sto. Tomas. His second was a biblical picture named Kalbaryo ni Jesus (Passion of Christ).

Barri made his first directorial job in a Fernando Poe production of Multo sa Opera (Ghost in the Opera) in 1954. He is well known for having given Fernando Poe, Jr. his first role in Anak ni Palaris.

Barri continued to direct into the 1960s. He died on 21 November 1963.

== Filmography ==
- 1955 – Anak ni Palaris (Son of Palaris)
- 1956 – Huk!
- 1959 – Anak Ng Kidlat (Daughter of Lightning) Tamaraw Studio Pictures
- 1961 – The Steel Claw
- 1962 – Adiong Sikat ng Tondo
- 1962 – Samar
- 1962 – Ano Ba Choy
- 1962 – Out of the Tiger's Mouth
- 1962 – Kapitan Tornado
- 1962 – Bilis Sa Bilis
- 1962 – No Man Is an Island
- 1962 -- Pagtutuos ng mga Kilabot
- 1962 – Kababalaghan o kabulastugan?
- 1962 – Chokaran
- 1963 – 13 Hudas
- 1964 – A Yank in Viet-Nam
