= Robert Campos =

Filipino actor

- Born: 1940
- Died: July 8, 2015

Robert Campos (1940 – July 8, 2015) was a Filipino actor with LVN Pictures.

== Biography ==
Campos grew up in Manila. The younger brother of actor Guy Donato, he studied in San Beda from grade 2 until he graduated from college. His former classmates in second grade included other famous actors like Fernando Poe, Jr., Eddie Gutierrez, and Bernard Bonnin.

He married another LVN star Luz Valdez. He made his first movie with Charito Solis and Diomedes Maturan in Rose Tattoo ng Buhay Ko (Rose Tattoo of my Life).

He made several pictures for LVN before the company closed in 1961. His second role was a rock star contestant in Combo Festival in which he was first paired with future wife Luz Valdez.

On July 8, 2015, he suffered a heart attack due to complications from colon cancer.

== Filmography ==
- 1958 – Rose Tattoo ng Buhay ko
- 1958 – Combo Festival
- 1958 – Isang paa sa hukay
- 1958 – Sa Puso ni Bathala
- 1960 – Dahlia
- 1961 – Sikat na, Siga Pa
- 1961 – Luis Latigo
- 1962 – Bakas ng gagamba
- 1962 – Malditong
- 1962 – Kadiong Ngiti
- 1963 – Ang Mga lawin
- 1963 – Palos kontra gagamba
- 1963 – Kilabot maghiganti
- 1964 – Ang lihim ni gagamba
- 1964 – Ginintuang ani
- 1964 – Umibig ay di biro
- 1965 – Pasko ng limang Magdalena
- 1965 – Labanang babae!
- 1984 – Kaya kong abutin ang langit
- 1984 – Working Girls
- 1984 – Soltero
- 1984 – Dapat ka bang mahalin?
- 1984 – Bagets
- 1985 – Mga Kwento ni Lola Basyang
- 1985 – Naked Paradise
- 1985 – Bed Sins
- 1986 – Tu-yay and His Magic Payong
