= Huk! =

1956 film by John Barnwell

- Film poster
- Directed by: John Barnwell
- Screenplay by: Stirling Silliphant
- Based on: Huk! by Stirling Silliphant
- Produced by: Collier Young
- Starring: George Montgomery; Mona Freeman; John Baer; James Bell; Teddy Benavides; Mario Barri
- Cinematography: William E. Snyder
- Edited by: Helene Turner
- Music by: Albert Glasser
- Production company: Pan Pacific Productions
- Distributed by: United Artists
- Release date: August 9, 1956
- Running time: 84 minutes
- Country: United States
- Language: English
- Budget: $350,000

Huk! is a 1956 American adventure film directed by John Barnwell and written by Stirling Silliphant and filmed in the Philippines. The film stars George Montgomery, Mona Freeman, John Baer, James Bell, Teddy Benavides and Mario Barri. The film was released on August 9, 1956, by United Artists. It is the first Philippine film of George Montgomery who would return to the islands in the 1960s to produce, direct, co-write and star in a number of Philippine films.

== Plot ==
Greg Dickson is an American born and raised in the Philippines. He returns to sell his deceased father's plantation after World War II and Philippine independence. His plantation ends up in the middle of the Huk Rebellion, with Greg and plantation workers fighting the rebel guerillas.

== Cast ==
- George Montgomery as Greg Dickson
- Mona Freeman as Cindy Rogers
- John Baer as Bart Rogers
- James Bell as Stephen Rogers
- Teddy Benavides as Major Balatbat
- Mario Barri as Kalak
- Ben Perez as Pinote
