= Niana Guerrero =

Filipino YouTuber and dancer (born 2006)

- Born: Niana Jose Evidente Guerrero; January 27, 2006 (age 20)
- Occupations: Social media personality; dancer
- Relatives: Ranz Kyle (half-brother)

TikTok information
- Page: nianaguerrero
- Years active: 2019–present
- Followers: 46.6 million

YouTube information
- Channel: Niana Guerrero
- Years active: 2013–present
- Subscribers: 15.8 million
- Views: 1.66 billion
- Last updated: May 1, 2026

Niana Jose Evidente Guerrero (born January 27, 2006) is a Filipino dancer and social media personality. She is known for her dance covers with her brother Ranz Kyle.

== Life and career ==
Guerrero is the daughter of Niño Guerrero and Elcid Evidente. She has two older half-siblings, Ranz Kyle (a member of the defunct dance group Chicser) and Chelseah Hilary, from her mother's previous relationship, and one older half-sister, Niña Stephanie, from her father's previous relationship. She has one younger full sister, Natalia. All of her siblings, including her, create content on YouTube.

She made her first appearance in a Chicser dance cover of "Teach Me How to Dougie" in 2011. In 2017, she gained fame in YouTube for her "Despacito" dance cover and has been making dance covers, especially with Ranz Kyle since then. In November 2019, she joined TikTok, where she usually posts dance videos. She is the most followed TikTok personality in the Philippines, reaching more than 40 million followers. In 2026, Guerrero debuted on Milan Fashion Week when she joined Onitsuka Tiger's Autumn-Winter show.

== Filmography ==
Year	Title	Role	Notes	Ref.
2016; 2021–present	ASAP Natin 'To	Herself (performer)	First television appearance	
2018	Good Morning	Herself	Guest with Ranz Kyle	
2021	Kapuso Mo, Jessica Soho	Herself	Guest with Ranz Kyle	
2022; 2024	It's Showtime	Herself	Guest performer	
2024	Fast Talk with Boy Abunda	Herself	Guest interviewee	

== Awards and nominations ==
Year	Award Giving Body	Category	Nominated Work	Results	Ref.
2019	Kids Choice Awards 2019	Favorite Pinoy Internet Star	YouTube, together with Ranz Kyle	Won	
2020	CICP Spotlight Awards	Entertainment Champion	YouTube, together with Ranz Kyle	Won	
2020	CICP Spotlight Awards	TikTok Superstar	Herself	Won	
2022	4th Gawad Lasallianeta	Most Effective TikTok Content Creator	TikTok	Won	
2022	The 70th FAMAS Awards	German Moreno Youth Achievement Award	Together with Ranz Kyle	Won	
2022	Best of TikTok PH	Global TikTok Originator	Herself	Won	
2023	Kids Choice Awards 2023	Favorite Asian Creator	Herself	Nominated	
2023	TikTok Awards Philippines 2023	Dance Creator of the Year	Herself	Won	
