= Cynthia Zamora =

Filipino actress (1938–2019)

- Born: April 8, 1938; Commonwealth of the Philippines
- Died: January 16, 2019 (aged 80); Las Vegas, Nevada, U.S.
- Occupation: Actress
- Years active: 1955–1959

Cynthia Zamora (April 8, 1938 – January 16, 2019) was a Filipino actress. She was nominated for a FAMAS award for best actress in 1961 for Huwag Mo Akong Limutan and in 1957 for Wala Nang Luha. During her film career she played opposite Eddie del Mar, Mario Montenegro, and Danilo Montes. In the decades preceding 2007, Cynthia Zamora owned an antique store on Magnolia Street in Burbank, CA. Zamora died from lymphoma in Las Vegas, Nevada on January 16, 2019, at the age of 80.

== Filmography ==
- 1955 -Unang Halik
- 1955 -Magia Blanca
- 1955 -Dakilang Hudas
- 1956 -El conde de Monte Carlo
- 1956 -Ambrocia
- 1956 -Heneral Paua, the story of General Jose Ignacio Paua, "who helped the Philippines in its struggle for liberty." It also starred Danilo Montes.
- 1956 -Prinsipe Villarba
- 1956 -Exzur
- 1956 -Cinco Hermanas
- 1957 -Kim
- 1957 -Barumbado
- 1957 -Wala nang Iluha
- 1957 -Pabo Real
- 1957 -Kalibre .45
- 1957 -Pusakal
- 1958 -Marta Soler
- 1958 -Sa Ngalan ng Espada
- 1958 -Obra-Maestra
- 1958 -Ramadal
- 1959 -Hindi Kita Anak
