= Ranz Kyle =

Filipino YouTuber and dancer

- Born: Ranz Kyle Vinel Evidente Ongsee; May 6, 1997 (age 28); San Juan, Philippines
- Occupations: Social media personality; dancer
- Relatives: Niana Guerrero

YouTube information
- Channel: Ranz Kyle
- Years active: 2010–present
- Subscribers: 15.2 million
- Views: 1.7 billion
- Last updated: June 2025

Ranz Kyle Viniel Evidente Ongsee (born May 6, 1997), better known as Ranz Kyle, is a Filipino actor, dancer, singer, and social media personality. He is known for his dance covers with his half-sister Niana Guerrero.

== Career ==
Ongsee started as a member of boyband Chicser in 2010. He joined YouTube in 2008, but uploaded his first video in August 2011. He had acting stints on TV5. In 2017, he gained fame in YouTube alongside Niana Guerrero for their dance covers.

== Filmography ==
=== Television ===
Year	Title	Role	Ref.
2013	Pepito Manaloto	Himself (Chicser guests)	
2013	Sunday All Stars	Himself (Chicser guests)	
2015	Wattpad Presents: Ex Ko Ang Idol 'Nyo	Calix	
2015	Wattpad Presents:That Girl	Aaron	
2016	Ang Panday	Joseph	

== Awards and nominations ==
Year	Award Giving Body	Category	Nominated Work	Results	Ref.
2019	Kids Choice Awards 2019	Favorite Pinoy Internet Star	YouTube	Won	
2020	CICP Spotlight Awards	Entertainment Champion	YouTube, together with Niana Guerrero	Won	
2022	The 70th FAMAS Awards	German Moreno Youth Achievement Award	Together with Niana Guerrero	Won	
