= Efren Reyes Sr. =

Filipino actor and director (1924–1968)

- Born: Efren Ongpin Reyes; June 18, 1924; Manila, Philippine Islands
- Died: February 11, 1968 (aged 43); Makati, Rizal, Philippines
- Occupations: Actor, writer, director, producer
- Known for: Pedro Penduko
- Spouse: Virginia Montes
- Children: 6, including Efren Jr.

Efren Ongpin Reyes Sr. (June 18, 1924 – February 11, 1968) was a Filipino actor, director, writer, and producer. He is known for originating the role of Pedro Penduko in film. When he became a director, he often collaborated with Fernando Poe Jr. He was the father of Efren Reyes Jr.

== Early life ==
Reyes Sr. was born on June 18, 1924, in Manila. Efren's grandfather was the celebrated Lola Basyang author, Severino Reyes, also the author and producer of Walang Sugat, the most popular of local zarzuelas.

== Career ==
Reyes was discovered by director Gregorio Fernandez. He started his career at an early age doing supporting roles in such movies as Hiram na Pangalan (1948) and Wala na akong Luha (1948). Kumander Sundang (1949) was his first break and biggest hit. He became Premiere Productions' top contract star turning in memorable performances in Kapitan Bagwis (1951), Kapitan Berong (1953), Paltik (1954), Abenturera (1954), Pedro Penduko (1954), Ander Di Saya (1954), Mag-asawa'y Di Biro (1954), and Ifugao (1954). For his role in Ifugao, he was awarded the Asian Film Festival Best Actor Award in 1955, the first Filipino to win that award. Two of his movies, Salabusab (1954) and Kalibre .45 (1957) were adjudged FAMAS Best Pictures, while he won the FAMAS Best Actor award for Kadenang Putik (1960). Known for his fencing skills, he appeared in many swashbuckling movies --- Prinsipe Don Juan (1950), Carlos Trece (1953), Prinsipe Villarba (1956), Haring Espada (1956), Prinsipe Alejandre (1957) and Eskrimador (1957). His sword duels with Johnny Monteiro in many movies they made together were a big treat to their legions of fans.

Reyes, according to his son, Efren Jr., pioneered the so-call Pinoy Western in Philippine movies, when his dad did Bandido in 1950. His colleagues then were reluctant and were not sold to the idea of doing the said movie because they saw it unrealistic as there were no cowboys in this country. The movie later turned out to be a big box-office hit that started the western genre in Philippine cinema.

He was also into film directing. His first directorial job was Haring Espada in 1956 using the pen name of Severino Reyes III. He likewise excelled in this field, gaining wide recognition and being nominated several times--- for Albano Brothers (1962), Sigaw ng Digmaan (1963), Pilipinas Kong Mahal (1965) and Dugo ang Kulay ng Pag-ibig (1966). He directed the legendary Fernando Poe Jr. in many memorable movies, among them, Sigaw ng Digmaan (1963), which won the FAMAS Best Picture that year, Ito ang Maynila (1963), Daniel Barrion (1964), Baril na Ginto (1964), Ang Daigdig Ko'y Ikaw (1965), Pilipinas Kong Mahal (1965) and Zamboanga (1966).

Reyes also produced and wrote several movies. He produced and directed Larawan ng Buhay, which he also wrote and starred in. He and his father Pedrito Reyes then collaborated on the screenplay of Lola Basyang. In the 1960s, he became the president of the Motion Picture Casting Corporation.

== Personal life ==
Efren Sr. was married to Primitiva Reyes, April 1, 1944. They had three children together, Reynaldo (1945–1951, Congenital Polio Meningitis), Winifrida (1948), and Efren Jr. (1950–1981)

He later married actress Virginia Montes, his leading lady in Bandido. They had six children. Two of them, Cristina Reyes and Efren Jr. (son of Virginia), followed their footsteps.

== Death ==
"When he died on Feb. 11, 1968, his coffin was placed atop the roof of Mount Carmel Church just to accommodate the throng of fans who wanted to pay their respects," said Efren. "And when he was being brought to his resting place, his friends carried his coffin from Mount Carmel to Loyola in Marikina."

"I only have fragments of his memories because he died when I was six. I only remembered the instances when all of us, the children, would enter his room in the morning to ask for baon. Ang gagawin n'ya, dudukutan n'ya mommy namin, para ibigay sa amin. ….Hindi n'ya ako napalo pero nataasan ako ng boses. Dun palang nanginig na ako (What he does, he snatches [money] from my mother, to give it to us. ...He never spanked me but he raised his voice once. That went me trembling)….. He used to bring us to Arcegas, here in Aurora Boulevard. There was a big toy store there. Pagdating ko doon, ang ligaya ko (When I got there, oh what a joy)."

== Filmography ==
=== Movie actor ===
- Bulalakaw (1948)
- Kumander Sundang (1949)
- Alamat ng Perlas na Itim (1949)
- Bakit Ako Luluha? (1949)
- Halik sa Bandila (1949)
- Kay Ganda ng Umaga (1949)
- Dugo ng Katipunan (1949)
- Hindi Ako Susuko (1949)
- Ang Kampana ng San Diego (1950)
- Santa Cristina (1951)
- Ang Sawa sa Lumang Simboryo (1952)
- Kapitan Berong (1953)
- Carlos Trece (1953)
- Salabusab (1954)
- Pedro Penduko (1954)
- Ifugao (1954) Lutab
- Eskrimador (1955)
- Desperado (1956)
- Prinsipe Villarba (1956)
- Kalibre .45 (1957)
- Ramadal (1958)
- Obra Maestra (1958)
- Sa Ngalan ng Espada (1958)
- Ang Maton (1959)
- The Scavengers (1959) Puan
- Kadenang Putik (1960)
- Hong Kong Honeymmon (1960)
- Basta Pinoy (1960)
- Baril sa Baril (1961)
- Alaala Kita (1961)
- Ako'y Alipin ng Opio (1961)
- Pitong Sagisag (1961)
- Apat na Kilabot (1962)
- Sarah Sollente (1962)
- Apat na Agimat (1962)
- Cuatro Condenados (1962)
- Ang Asawa Kong Barat (1963)
- The Raiders of Leyte Gulf (1963) Capt. Shirai Akira
- Dugo ang Kulay ng Pag-ibig (1966)
- Hangganan ng Matatapang (1967)

=== Movie director ===
- Ramadal (1958)
- Obra Maestra (1958)
- Sa Ngalan ng Espada (1958)
- Singing Idol (1958)
- Pitong Gatang (1959)
- Basta Pinoy (1960)
- Awat na Adyang (1961)
- Ako'y Alipin ng Opio (1961)
- Pitong Sagisag (1961)
- Batang Maynila (1962)
- Apat na Kilabot (1962)
- Apat na Agimat (1962)
- Albano Brothers (1962)
- Panginoon (1962)
- Cuatro Condenados (1962)
- Sugapa (1963)
- Sigaw ng Digmaan (1963)
- Kung Gabi sa Maynila (1963)
- Ito ang Maynila (1963)
- Ang Babaeng Isputnik (1963)
- Ang Asawa Kong Barat (1963)
- Kung Hindi Ka Susuko...! (1963)
- Ang Sangano at Colegiala (1963)
- Baril na Ginto (1964)
- Swanie (1965)
- Pilipinas Kong Mahal (1965)
- Ang Daigdig Ko'y Ikaw (1965)
- Zamboanga (1966)
- Dugo ang Kulay ng Pag-ibig (1966)
- Dakilang Balatkayo (1966)
- Itinakwil Man Kita (1966)
- The Jukebox Queen (1966)
- Kardong Pusa (1968)
- Jingy (1968)
- Ang Dayuhan (1968)
- Alyas 1 2 3 (1968)

=== Movie writer ===
- Singing Idol (1958; story)
- Lola Basyang (1958; screenplay)
- Pitong Gatang (1959; screenplay)
- Basta Pinoy (1960; screenplay and story)
- Pitong Sagisag (1961; screenplay)
- Albano Brothers (1962; screenplay)
- Cuatro Condenados (1962; written by)
- Kung Gabi sa Maynila (1963; story)
- Ang Babaeng Isputnik (1963; story)
- Ang Asawa Kong Barat (1963; story)
- Kung Hindi Ka Susuko...! (1963; story)
- Ang Sangano at Colegiala (1963; story)
- Ang Daigdig Ko'y Ikaw (1965; written by)
- The Jukebox Queen (1966; story)

== Awards and honors ==
As actor
Year	Category	Film	Result	Ref.
1954	Asian Film Festival Best Actor	Ifugao	Won	
1960	FAMAS Award for Best Actor	Kadenang Putik	Won	

As director
Year	Category	Film	Result	Ref.
1963	FAMAS Award for Best Picture	Sigaw ng Digmaan	Won	

Honors

- 2006: Eastwood City Walk of Fame
