= Bulaklak Magazine =

Bulaklak Magazine (literally “Flower Magazine”), subtitled Hiyas ng Tahanan (“Gem of the Home"), was a Tagalog-language magazine that was first published in the Philippines on April 14, 1947. Published by the Social and Commercial Press, a company owned by Beatriz M. de Guballa, Bulaklak Magazine was similar in content and structure to Liwayway magazine, featuring narratives in prose, serials, poetry, entertainment news, comic strips, crossword puzzles, caricatures, and health tips, among other regular features. It was on July 23, 1947, in the Volume 4, #17 issue when the superheroine character, which would become Darna in 1950s- then known as Varga - appeared on the pages of Bulaklak Magazine. The character was developed by Mars Ravelo.
