= Ramon d'Salva =

Filipino actor (1921–1994)

Ramon D'Salva
- Born: Ramon D'Salva; December 28, 1921; Philippines
- Died: August 28, 1994 (aged 72); Philippines
- Occupation: Actor
- Years active: 1949-1994

Ramon D'Salva (December 28, 1921 - August 28, 1994) was a Filipino actor who was known for villain roles and played in numerous films under his home studio Premiere Productions. He made his first film, Suwail, in 1949.

D'Salva was most often than not also widely known for playing rich, aristocratic Dons on screen, and for his proficiency in speaking the language, leading him to be hailed as one of the "Original Spanish-speaking Villains" in Philippine Movie History.

== Filmography ==
Year	Title	Role	Note(s)	Ref(s).
1949	Suwail			
1949	Kidlat sa Silangan			
1949	Dugo ng Katipunan			
1949	Hindi Ako Susuko			
1949	Ang Lumang Bahay sa Gulod			
1950	Ang Hiwaga ng Tulay Na Bato			
1950	Wanted: Patay o Buhay			
1950	Tatlong Balaraw			
1950	Ang Kampana ng San Diego			
1950	Punglo at Pag-ibig			
1951	Sa Oras ng Kasal			
1951	Kadakilaan			
1951	Santa Cristina			
1951	Bahay Na Tisa			
1952	Kalbaryo ni Hesus			
1952	Salome			
1952	Golem			
1953	Tiyanak			
1953	Pagsikat ng Araw			
1953	Sa Hirap at Ginhawa			
1953	Babaing Kalbo			
1954	Guwapo			
1954	Goldiger			
1954	Ander De Saya			
1954	Mr. Dupong			
1954	Si Og sa Army			
1954	Paladin			
1954	Pedro Penduko			
1955	Anak ni Palaris			
1955	D 1-13			
1955	Ito ang Aming Daigdig			
1955	El Jugador			
1955	Magia Blanca			
1955	Tomboy			
1956	Desperado			
1956	Takya			
1956	Santa Lucia			
1956	Heneral Paua			
1956	Buhay at Pag-ibig ni Dr. Jose Rizal			
1956	Prinsipe Villarba			
1956	Haring Espada			
1956	Montalan Brothers			
1956	Mrs. Jose Romulo			
1957	Libre Comida			
1957	Maskara			
1957	Bicol Express			
1957	Yaya Maria			
1958	Marta Soler			
1958	Kurangga			
1958	Matira ang Matibay			
1958	May Pasikat Ba sa Kano?			
1958	Sa Ngalan ng Espada			
1958	Mga Liham kay Tia Dely			
1958	Ramadal			
1958	Sisang Tabak			
1958	Apat Na Pulubi			
1961	Noli Me Tángere	Alferez		
1962	El filibusterismo	Alferez		
1964	Ging			
1967	Batman Fights Dracula			
1967	Alamat ng 7 Kilabot			
1971	Playpen			
1972	Rio Tigre			
1975	Ang Pag-ibig Ko'y Huwag Mong Sukatin			
1976	Call Me Direnzi			
1977	Bakya Mo, Neneng			
1980	Six Million Centavo Man			
1980	Kape't Gatas			
1981	Takbo... Peter... Takbo!			
1981	The Story of Woo Viet	Filipino with Moustache in Church		
1982	Good Morning Professor			
1982	Annie Sabungera			
1982	Hanggang sa Wakas			
1983	E.T. Is Estong Tutong			
1983	To Love Again	Señor Leo de Gracia		
1983	Maestro Bandido			
1984	Nang Masugatan ang Gabi			
1984	May Lamok sa Loob ng Kulambo	Bitoy		
1985	Sugat sa Dangal			
1985	Goat Buster sa Templo ni Dune			
1985	Heartache City			
1985	Hari ng Gatilyo			
1985	Victor Lopez, Jr. (Robinhood ng Tondo)			
1986	Rocky Tan-go IV	Mr. Mercado		
1986	Isang Kumot, Tatlong Unan			
1986	Payaso			
1987	Bakit Iisa ang Pag-ibig?			
1987	Feliciano Luces: Alyas Kumander Toothpick, Mindanao			
1988	Ang Supremo			
1989	Eagle Squad	Edmund's father		
1989	Everlasting Love			
1992	Jerry Marasigan, WPD			
1992	Lakay			
1993	Angelfist	De Vega/Ring Announcer		
1993	Live by the Fist			
