= Carina Afable =

Filipina actress and singer

- Born: Carina Agoncillo
- Occupations: Actress; Singer
- Years active: 1960s-1970s
- Spouses: Ryan Silos (divorced) Leonard Bell (died): Samuel H. Gray
- Children: Richie Silos; Robert Silos; Cherry Silos; Ronnie Silos; Christopher Bell
- Relatives: Ryan Agoncillo (nephew)

Carina Afable (born Carina Agoncillo) is a retired Filipina actress and singer.

== Biography ==
Afable began her professional career as a member of the Philippines' singing Agoncillo family. At age 7, her aunt, Dori Villena, began taking her to Filipino radio and television stations, and Afable started appearing in soap operas and doing commercials, including one for Carnation milk.

In 1960, she joined the cast of the radio program Botika sa Baryo, and went on to the daytime television variety show Stop, Look & Listen, which ran from 1968 to 1972 on ABS-CBN. In her teens, she starred in such musical-variety shows as Chelsea Dance Time, Spotlight on Carina (which aired on Channel 3), Carina (Channel 11) and May I Sing to You (Channel 5) and went on to appear in movies, beginning with Vera Perez Pictures' version of Tawag ng Tanghalan (1958), and going on to I’m a Tiger and 1967's I’ll See You in September. She starred in the children's television show Kiddie Land (Channel 5). She appeared in such films as Agents Wen Manong (1968), Patria Adorada (Dugo ng Bayani), and Intensity '70 (1970), her last Filipino movie.

In the 1970s, Afable, who recorded albums on the Villar label, sang in the girl group Hi-Pertensions with Norma Ledesma and Linda Magno. As a singer, she would often dub over Susan Roces's voice when she sang in films.

When martial law was declared in 1972, shutting down television production and curtailing live musical performances, Afable's career waned. Prior to this, she had toured North America, Germany and France as a solo act, and subsequently, in the late 1970s, she emigrated to the United States. There she appeared in three episodes of the American police sitcom Barney Miller as Deputy Inspector Frank Luger (James Gregory)'s mail-order bride. She went on to do TV commercials, including for the Reggie Jackson barbecue grill and Wienerschnitzel hotdogs, for which she sang the commercial jingle. As of 2012, Afable works for Anthem-Blue Cross. Although she is retired, she occasionally performs for the Filipino community in the US. In 2015, she reunited with Hi-Pertensions for a fundraising concert.

== Personal life ==
Afable married Filipino television director Raul Silos, and had the first of her several children at age 16. Before their divorce, the couple had four children, Richie, Robert, Cherry and Ronnie Silos. Afable married Leonard Bell, an American, in the 1970s, with whom she had another son, Christopher. She and Bell were married for seven years, until his death. Sometime later, she married Samuel H. Gray, also an American. One of her nephews is singer-actor Ryan Agoncillo.

== Awards and nominations ==
1970 nomination, Supporting Actress, Famas Awards.
