= Feliciano Luces: Alyas Kumander Toothpick, Mindanao =

1987 Filipino film starring Ramon Revilla

- Official movie poster
- Directed by: Pablo Santiago
- Written by: Tony Pascua; Fred Navarro
- Produced by: Rowell Santiago
- Starring: Ramon Revilla
- Cinematography: Alfonso Alvarez
- Edited by: Rene Tala
- Music by: Jun Latonio
- Production company: Vista Films
- Release date: July 15, 1987
- Country: Philippines
- Language: Filipino

Feliciano Luces: Alyas Kumander Toothpick, Mindanao (marketed as Feliciano Luces: Alyas Kumander Toothpick) is a 1987 Filipino action film directed by Pablo Santiago and starring Ramon Revilla as the titular commander. It also stars Dang Cecilio, Rey Abellana, Tanya Gomez, Paquito Diaz, Raoul Aragonn, Charlie Davao, Esther Chavez, Romy Diaz, and Ruel Vernal. The film employs Revilla's usual formula of having his character own a protective amulet in battle. Produced by Vista Films as its inaugural film, it was released on July 15, 1987. Critic Mike Feria of the Manila Standard gave the film a negative review, criticizing its screenplay and Revilla's exaggerated acting.

== Cast ==
- Ramon Revilla as Feliciano Luces/Kumander Toothpick
- Dang Cecilio
- Rey Abellana
- Tanya Gomez
- Paquito Diaz
- Charlie Davao as Mister Lazaro
- Romy Diaz
- Raoul Aragonn
- Ruel Vernal
- Johnny Madrid
- Johnny Vicar
- Karim Kiram
- Yusuf Salim
- Max Alvarado
- Marilou Sadiua as Myrna
- Carlos de Leon
- Eddie Tuazon
- Esther Chavez
- Ramon de Salva
- Ernie Zarate as the mayor
- Fred Moro as a man of Lazaro

== Themes ==
Feliciano Luces is a continuation of Ramon Revilla's formula of portraying notorious or real-life characters who protect themselves with amulets ("anting-anting") in battle, sustaining a traditional belief of native Filipinos which has endured to contemporary times. Luces' death is depicted in the film as being caused by a spirit taking away his amulet.

== Release ==
The film was given a "P" rating by the Movie and Television Review and Classification Board (MTRCB), and was released on July 15, 1987.

=== Critical response ===
Mike Feria of the Manila Standard gave Feliciano Luces a negative review, criticizing the screenplay's misguided storytelling and lack of focus as well as Revilla's acting ("here he is as ham as ever").
