= Diomedes Maturan =

Filipino actor and singer

- Born: August 16, 1940; Bacolod City, Negros Occidental Province, Visayas, Philippine Islands
- Died: April 7, 2002 (aged 61) Manila City, Metro Manila, Luzon, Philippines
- Genres: OPM
- Occupations: Singer, actor
- Instrument: Voice
- Years active: 1955–1990s

Diomedes Maturan (August 16, 1940 – April 7, 2002) (tagged the "Perry Como of the Philippines" and "The Golden Voice") was an actor who played in Botika sa Baryo (1960) and a grand champion in Tawag ng Tanghalan.

== Early life ==
Maturan was born in Bacolod City, Negros Occidental Province.

== Career ==
He rose to fame by winning the popular singing competition "Tawag ng Tanghalan" for his song "Rose Tattoo" in 1955.

== Death ==
Maturan died on April 7, 2002, of heart attack at age 61 in the City of Manila.

== Discography ==
- Ako'y Nakikiusap
- Alam Mo Ba Mahal Kita?
- Bakit
- Buhat
- Dahil Sa Iyo
- Di Maipagtapat
- Di Mo Man Lang Pinansin
- Dinggin
- Don't Play With Fire
- Gabi at Araw
- In Despair
- In This Corner
- Kailan Man Hanggang Wakas
- Kay Hirap Pala Ng Iwanan
- Lahat Ng Araw
- Magmula Ngayon
- Nasaan Ka
- Rose Tattoo
- Sana'y Maniwala
- Thru Eternity
