= Manding Claro =

Filipino actor

- Born: 1938 (age 87–88)
- Occupation: Actor

Manding Claro (born 1938) is a former Filipino matinee idol of LVN Pictures of the 1950s paired with another matinee idol, Nenita Vidal.

Their teaming was very popular during the mid-1950s for movies such as Dalagita't Binatilyo and Banda Uno in 1955, Puppy Love in 1956, Medalyong Perlas, a musical in 1956, Phone Pal, Lelong Mong Panot and Troop 11 in 1957.

He later transferred to Sampaguita Pictures, where he made several more movies and ended his career as an actor to pursue a career as a singer. He was very successful as a singer for many years with tours throughout Asia.

He retired from show business in 1958. He was inducted to the Eastwood City Walk Of Fame in December 2013.

== Filmography ==
Year	Film/song
1954	Tin-Edyer (aka Teenager)
1955	Dalagita't Binatilyo (aka Guys & Dolls)
1955	Banda Uno (aka Band No. 1)
1955	Ikaw Kasi (aka You are to Blame)
1956	Puppy Love
1956	Medalyong Perlas (aka Pearl Medal)
1956	Dama Juana Gang (aka Bottleneck Gang)
1957	Phone Pal
1957	Troop 11
1957	Lelong Mong Panot (aka Your Bald Grandpa!)
1958	Eddie Junior Detective [LVN]
1958	Ay Pepita! (aka Oh Pepita!
1958	Casa Grande (aka Grand House)

== Awards ==
- Celebrity Inductee, 2013 Eastwood City Walk Of Fame
