= Luz Valdez =

Filipina actress

- Born: Milagros Bernardo; 9 September 1940 (age 85); Olongapo, Commonwealth of the Philippines
- Other name: Luz
- Occupation: Actress
- Years active: 1958–present
- Spouse: Robert Campos

Luz Valdez (born Milagros Bernardo; September 9, 1940), is a Filipina actress.

The Valdez screen name was given to her in 1958 by Narcisa de Leon, producer and co-founder of LVN Pictures, as she felt that Milagros Bernardo was too long and wanted her new contract player to have a name that would be easily remembered.

== Filmography ==
=== Film ===
Year	Title	Role	Notes
1958	Ay, Pepita!		
1958	Ana Maria		
1958	Combo Festival		
1959	Tuko sa Madre Kakaw		Main cast
1959	Barrio Fiesta		
1959	Private Maturan		
1959	Chinita	Chinita	Lead role
1959	Masusunod... o Hindi?		Lead role
1959	Detective Maturan		
1960	Pakipot		
1960	Navy Blues		
1960	Teen-Age Crush		
1960	Tres Mosqueteros		
1961	Luis Latigo		
1961	Sa Puso ni Bathala		
1961	Tanglaw sa Dilim		
1961	Magdasal Ka Na!		
1961	Sikat Na, Siga Pa		
1962	Jikiri		
1962	Merrill's Marauders	Burmese refugee	
1962	Bakas ng Gagamba		
1963	Palos Kontra Gagamba		
1963	Alias Golden Boy		
1963	Magtago Ka Na, Binata!		
1963	Ang Mga Lawin		
1963	Kayo ang Humatol!		
1963	Shoot to Kill		
1964	Ginintuang Ani		
1964	Hit Parade		
1964	Umibig Ay Di Biro		One segment
1964	Pamilya Galawgaw		
1965	Tiagong Ulupong		
1968	Sayonara, My Darling		
1984	Bagets	Gilbert's mother	
1988	Buy One, Take One		
1988	Pik Pak Boom	Mrs. Posadas	"Banana Q" segment
1989	My Darling Domestic (Greyt Eskeyp)		
1990	Atorni Agaton (Abogadong de Kampanilya)	Imelda	
1991	Kaputol ng Isang Awit		
1992	Sinungaling Mong Puso		
1993	Pido Dida 3: May Kambal Na		
1993	Humanda Ka Mayor!: Bahala Na ang Diyos	Ms. Beltran	
1993	Mancao	Mancao's mother	
1994	Megamol		
1994	Baby Paterno (Dugong Pulis)	Baby's mother	
1994	Marami Ka Pang Kakaining Bigas	Mother of Monette	
1994	Anghel Na Walang Langit		
1995	Alfredo Lim: Batas ng Maynila		
1995	Bocaue Pagoda Tragedy		
1995	Sa Ngalan ng Pag-ibig	Mrs. Moran/office secretary	
1995	Muling Umawit ang Puso	Gracia	
1996	Sariwa		
1996	Kristo		
1996	Kabilin-bilinan ng Lola ('Wag Uminom ng Serbesa)	Eden	
1997	Kriselda: Sabik sa 'Yo	Delia	
1997	Honey, Nasa Langit Na Ba Ako?	Mrs. Santos	
1997	Nang Iniwan Mo Ako		
1998	Strebel: Gestapo ng Maynila		
1999	Mister Mo, Lover Ko	Aling Andrea	
1999	Higit Pa sa Buhay Ko	Mrs. Acosta	
2001	Pagdating ng Panahon	Nanay Luning	
2002	Ikaw Lamang Hanggang Ngayon		
2002	Forevermore		
2006	Till I Met You	Aling Loleng	
2009	Ang Panday	Lola Mameng	
2010	The Red Shoes	Aurora Aquino	
2010	I'll Be There	Bebang	
2012	Bwakaw	Minda	
2013	Momzillas	Lola Juanita	
2021	My Amanda	Inang	

=== Television ===
Year	Title	Role	Notes
2000–2005	Idol Ko si Kap	Aling Idang	Main cast
2004	Maalaala Mo Kaya: Scrapbook	Sandara's Grandma	Supporting role
2005–2006	Sugo	Lola Giray	Supporting role
2006	Calla Lily	Aling Mameng	Main cast
2006	Love to Love: Young at Heart	Lola Clara	Supporting role
2006–2007	Bakekang	Lola Maria	Guest
2007	Super Twins	Ising	Supporting role
2008	Sine Novela: Magdusa Ka	Aling Bebang	Supporting role
2008–2009	Sine Novela: Saan Darating ang Umaga?	Sabel	Supporting role
2009	Adik Sa'Yo	Lola Caring Domingo	Supporting role
2009–2010	Ikaw Sana	Lola Chabeng Mendez-Garcia	Supporting role
2010	Sine Novela: Gumapang Ka sa Lusak	Lola Isang	Supporting role
2010	Jillian: Namamasko Po	Virgie	Guest
2011	I Heart You, Pare!	Charito Castillo	Supporting role
2011–2012	Munting Heredera	Maria	Supporting role
2012	The Good Daughter	Lourdes Atillano	Supporting role
2012–2013	Enchanted Garden	Aling Biring	Supporting role
2012–2013	Pahiram ng Sandali	Trining Alvaro	Supporting role
2013	Love & Lies	Rosa Galvez	Supporting role
2013–2014	Magkano Ba ang Pag-ibig?	Rosing Villasanta	Supporting role
2014	Niño	Epang	Supporting role
2015	Pari 'Koy	Esther	Supporting role
2015	Nathaniel	Lola Gina	Guest cast
2015–2016	The Half Sisters	Belinda	15 episodes
2016	Hanggang Makita Kang Muli	Conching Luna	Supporting cast
2016–2017	Someone to Watch Over Me	Rose Montenegro	Supporting cast
2017	Destined to be Yours	Delia	Supporting cast
2018	The One That Got Away	Maria "Mama Ya" Delos Reyes	Supporting cast
2019	The General's Daughter	Nanang Gloria	Supporting cast
2019–2020	The Gift	Puring Reyes	Supporting cast
