= Herminio Bautista =

Filipino actor

Herminio dela Cruz "Butch" Bautista
- Born: Herminio dela Cruz Bautista; May 20, 1934; Santa Cruz, Manila, Philippine Islands
- Died: February 12, 2017 (aged 82); Quezon City, Philippines
- Occupations: Actor, Comedian, Director, Politician
- Years active: 1956–2017
- Known for: Lo' Waist Gang
- Height: 5 ft 8 in (173 cm)
- Spouse: Rosario "Baby" Maclang
- Children: Herbert; Harlene; Harold; Hero; Anthony; Abegail
- Parents: Graciano Valenzuela Bautista (father); Eladia Gigante dela Cruz (mother)
- Relatives: Siblings: Amalia Bautista Edrada; Jaime dela Cruz Bautista; Aurora Bautista Hizon; Graciano dela Cruz Bautista Jr; Manuel dela Cruz Bautista; Estrella Bautista Fabella

Herminio "Butch" dela Cruz Bautista (May 20, 1934 – February 12, 2017) was a Filipino comedian, director and politician, who made his film debut in the 1956 film Lo' Waist Gang along with Berting Labra, Zaldy Zschornack and others, which was topbilled by Fernando Poe Jr.

== Personal life ==
Bautista was married to Rosario Maclang, and had six children, among whom were actor-turned-politician Herbert, politician Hero, and actress Harlene.

== Death ==
Bautista died on February 12, 2017, at the age of 82.

== Filmography ==
=== Film ===
==== As actor ====
Year	Title	Role	Notes
1956	Lo' Waist Gang		
1957	Libre Comida		
1957	Bakasyon Grande		
1957	Los Lacuacheros		
1957	Yaya Maria		
1958	Lutong Makaw		
1958	Lo' Waist Gang at si Og sa Mindoro		
1958	Apat Na Pulubi		
1960	Gabi ng Lagim		Fourth segment
1960	Lo' Waist Gang Joins the Army		
1960	Johnny Davao		
1960	Cuatro Cantos		
1960	True Confessions		Fourth segment
1961	Nagsasalitang Kalansay		
1962	Operasyon Bayong		
1962	Reynang Nakabakya		
1963	Death Was a Stranger		
1963	Big Four		
1964	Magda Sales		
1964	Contra Cuatro		
1971	Sa Bawa't Patak ng Hamog		
1982	Dear God		
1983	Over My Dead Body		
1984	Bagets	Butch Bautista	
1986	Iyo ang Tondo, Kanya ang Cavite	Botong	
1992	Mahal, Saan Ka Natulog Kagabi?		
1992	Lakay		
2014	Da Possessed	Kumpadre	

==== As director ====
Year	Title	Notes
1962	Santa Clarang Pinung-Pino	
1962	Asiong Meets Alembong	
1963	Big Four	
1964	Mga Payanig	
1964	Captain Barbell	
1964	Contra Cuatro	
1964	Sa Daigdig ng Fantasia	
1965	Dolpinger	
1965	Dolpinger, Agent sa Lagim	
1965	Titong Robin Hood	
1966	Alias Popeye	
1967	Wild, Wild Wong	
1968	Blackhawk Commandos	
1971	Encuentro ng Mga Hari	
1971	Boy Poklat	
1981	Mister Kwekong (Driver ng Punerarya)	
1983	Over My Dead Body	

==== As writer ====
Year	Title	Notes
1961	Magdasal Ka Na!	
1962	Santa Clarang Pinung-Pino	
1963	Ginoong Itim	
1963	Istambay	
1963	Sugapa	
1966	Alias Popeye	Story writer
1976	Bato sa Buhangin	Story writer
1982	Si Ako at ang Tres Moskiteros	With Poch Bautista

==== As production designer ====
Year	Title	Notes
1974	Batingaw	
1979	Mabango Ba ang Bawat Bulaklak?	
1980	Kape't Gatas	
1982	Annie Sabungera	

=== Television ===
==== As director ====
Year	Title	Notes
1972	Bahay-Bahayan	
