= Premiere Productions =

Philippine film production company

- Company type: Private
- Industry: Film production
- Founded: 1946
- Defunct: 2004
- Fate: Closed
- Headquarters: Caloocan, Philippines
- Owner: Ciriaco Santiago
- Website: Premiere Horizon Alliance

Premiere Entertainment Productions was a Philippine film production company. It was among the country's major film companies, along with Sampaguita Pictures, LVN Pictures and Lea Productions. It now operates as an investment holding company.

== History ==
The film company was established in 1946 by the late Dr. Ciriaco Santiago and his wife Adela Hermoso as Premiere Productions. Probinsyana was its maiden movie, first seen at the defunct Dalisay Theater (along Avenida) on August 13. Premiere won Maria Clara Best Picture trophies for Kamay ni Satanas (1950) and Sisa (1951).

Among its homegrown talents were Nena Cardenas, Anita Linda, Virginia Montes, Rosita Noble, Edna Luna, Gloria Sevilla, Carol Varga, Corazon Rivas, Olivia Cenizal (initially known as Gloria Cenizal), Cielito Legaspi, Shirley Gorospe, Celia Rodriguez, Rosemarie Gil, Efren Reyes Sr., Fernando Poe Jr., Carlos Padilla Jr., Johnny Monteiro, Jose Romulo, Zaldy Zshornack and Eddie Fernandez.

Premiere became known in the action genre with movies headlined by Efren Reyes, Jose Padilla Jr., Fernando Poe Jr., Bob Soler, and Eddie Fernandez. A lot of its films were directed by national artist Gerardo de Leon, who was named Best Director for Ifugao (1954) at the 1955 Asian Film Festival in Singapore; and elevated to the FAMAS Best Director Hall of Fame for winning seven Best Director trophies.

In 1952, Premiere was among the film companies bugged by labor problems, prompting it to temporarily stop production. Not long after, People’s Pictures was established. In 1957, Premiere resumed production.

In 1972, Santiago's daughter Digna took over the film company's operations produced award-winning and blockbuster movies like Ang Uliran (1971), which won as Best Drama, and Postcards from China (1975). In 1977, Premiere was inducted into the FAMAS Award's Hall of Fame in 1977 for winning five Best Picture Awards for Ang Sawa sa Lumang Simboryo (1952), Salabusab (1954), Kalibre .45 (1957), Huwag Mo Akong Limutin (1960) and Minsa’y Isang Gamu-Gamo (1976).

By 1979, Premiere stopped production of films. However, its filming equipment and post-production facilities remained in use for international co-productions such as Equalizer 2000 (1987) and The Expendables (1988) directed by Ciriaco Santiago's son Cirio H. Santiago.

In 1996, the film company revived production as Premiere Entertainment Productions. Its maiden movie, To Saudi with Love, was an entry in that year's Manila Film Festival. Among its films produced at that time were Aringkingking (1996), which was an entry in the 1996 Metro Manila Film Festival; the remake of Anak ng Bulkan (1997), which was inspired by the 1991 eruption of Mount Pinatubo; a Ruben Torres biopic Kadre (1997); Ama Namin (1998) and Operation Balikatan (2003).

In 2004, in light of the continuous slowdown in the film industry, Premiere indefinitely stopped production of films. Its last film produced was Captain Barbell, which was an entry to the 2003 Metro Manila Film Festival, where it was nominated as Best Picture and was the highest-grossing film, earning P61 Million. Since then, it shifted its focus as an investment holding company, now known as Premiere Horizon Alliance Corporation.
