= Manila, Open City =

- Directed by: Eddie Romero
- Written by: Eddie Romero
- Produced by: Eddie Romero
- Starring: Charito Solis; James Shigeta; Alex Nicol; John Ashley; Ric Rodgrigo; Vic Diaz
- Cinematography: Dik Trofeo
- Edited by: Elsa Abutal
- Music by: Leopoldo Silos
- Production company: Nepomuceno Productions
- Release date: June 12, 1968
- Running time: 86 minutes
- Country: Philippines
- Languages: English; Filipino; Japanese

Manila, Open City (International Title: American Tank Force) is a 1968 war film written, produced, and directed by Eddie Romero about the Battle of Manila in World War II. The film was screened upon the launching of the National Film Archive of the Philippines in December 2011.

The film is in the public domain.

== Plot ==
In the final days of World War II, Allied forces approach Manila. The occupying Japanese army turns on the locals.

== Cast ==
- Charito Solis as Sor Matilde
- James Shigeta as Capt. Murakami
- Alex Nicol as Col. Bergen
- John Ashley as Morgan
- Mario Montenegro as Marcos Liwag
- Ric Rodrigo as Guerilla Commander
- Vic Diaz as Col. Hamada
- Ben Perez as Capt. Kondo
- Nova Villa as a young girl
- Eddie Garcia as Rear Adm. Sanji Iwabuchi
- Cachupoy
- Amelia Amante

== Production ==
The film was one of a series of war movies Romero made which featured American actors, others including Lost Battalion (1960), The Walls of Hell, The Ravagers, and The Raiders of Leyte Gulf. The film featured John Ashley who would team with Romeo on Brides of Blood and a series of other horror movies.

Romero says the production company imported Ashley and Alex Nicol, and it was on this film he met John Ashley.

== See also ==
- The Ravagers (film)
- The Walls of Hell
- Santiago! (film)
- Aguila (film)
