= The Mad Doctor of Blood Island =

- Theatrical release poster
- Directed by: Eddie Romero; Gerry DeLeon
- Written by: Reuben Canoy
- Produced by: Eddie Romero; Kane W. Lynn
- Starring: John Ashley; Angelique Pettyjohn; Eddie Garcia; Ronald Remy
- Cinematography: Justo Paulino
- Music by: Tito Arevalo
- Production company: Hemisphere Pictures
- Distributed by: Hemisphere Pictures (United States); Saxon Films (United Kingdom); Astral Films (Canada)
- Release date: May 11, 1969 (United States)
- Running time: 85 minutes
- Country: Philippines
- Language: English
- Budget: US$100,000–125,000

The Mad Doctor of Blood Island is a 1969 Filipino horror film, co-directed by Eddie Romero and Gerardo de Leon, and starring John Ashley, Angelique Pettyjohn, Eddie Garcia, and Ronald Remy.

It was the third in a series of four Filipino horror films produced by Romero and Kane W. Lynn known as the "Blood Island" series, which also included Terror Is a Man, Brides of Blood, and Beast of Blood. Beverly Miller was associate producer on this film, and later went on to co-produce several other Filipino horror films. The film has been noted for containing more nudity and gore than previous entries in the series.

The plot involves a man traveling to an island where a mad scientist named Dr. Lorca is creating human/plant mutants with chlorophyll blood out of the local natives. The film was later syndicated to television as Tomb of the Living Dead. It was also briefly known in certain states as The Mad Doctor of Crimson Island.

== Plot ==
A woman running naked through the jungle on Blood Island is killed by a green-skinned beast that resembles a man. At the same time, a ship arrives at the island carrying American pathologist Bill Foster, who is investigating a strange chlorophyll disease among the islanders; Sheila Willard, who has come to Blood Island seeking to reunite with her father; and Carlos Lopez, who wants to get his mother, Mrs. Lopez, to move off the island. The captain of the ship claims that the island is cursed and tells a story of a man they picked up on a raft who bled green blood before he escaped into the sea.

Sheila discovers that her father is a hopeless alcoholic. Mrs. Lopez does not want to leave the island, even though her husband, Don Ramon Lopez, died there recently under mysterious circumstances. The suspicious Dr. Lorca will not reveal any details about Don Ramon's death to anyone. When Foster and Lopez exhume the grave of Don Ramon, it is empty.

Rumors abound about a green-skinned monster with chlorophyll blood that has been killing the local natives. One night, a native with green sores on his body tries to break into the government house, but runs off into the jungle when he is confronted. Sheila is attacked in the jungle by the chlorophyll monster, but manages to escape when an unfortunate native who comes to her rescue is gruesomely mutilated by the creature. Sheila and Dr. Foster fall in love during their stay on the island.

It is revealed that Dr. Lorca has been experimenting on the natives, including the unfortunate Don Ramon, who had sought Dr. Lorca's serum as a treatment for his cancer, but was turned into a monster instead. They learn that Don Ramon is actually the green-blooded beast that has been killing people on the island. Don Ramon kills his wife, and almost kills his son Carlos, but at the last moment a glimmer of humanity returns to the creature and realizing what a monster he has become, he attacks Dr. Lorca in his hidden lab instead. A fire breaks out in Lorca's lab, resulting in a huge explosion, killing Dr. Lorca, his assistant and the monster.

Sheila, her father, Dr. Foster and Carlos all return to the ship, glad to finally leave Blood Island. But as the ship leaves port, a grisly hand appears from underneath a boat tarp, dripping green blood.

== Cast ==
- John Ashley as Dr. Bill Foster
- Angelique Pettyjohn as Sheila Willard
- Ronald Remy as Dr. Lorca
- Alicia Alonzo as Marla
- Ronaldo Valdez as Carlos Lopez
- Tita Muñoz as Mrs. Lopez
- Tony Edmunds as Mr. Willard
- Alfonso Carvajal as Ramu
- Bruno Punzalan as Razak
- Edward D. Murphy as Captain
- Eddie Garcia as the monster

== Production ==
Prior to production on The Mad Doctor of Blood Island, Ashley had starred in Brides of Blood. The film was popular enough in the United States that American distributors asked him to appear in a follow-up film. Ashley agreed, which led to his moving to the Philippines and co-producing several other films there in partnership with Romero, Beverly Miller, and Roger Corman.

Mad Doctor was produced by Romero and Kane W. Lynn along with Miller and Irwin Pizor on a budget of either $125,000 or $100,000. Similar to Brides of Blood, the film was intended for an American audience and its plot and dialogue made no reference to the Philippines.

Film scholar Bliss Cua Lim places The Mad Doctor of Blood Island within a series of low-budget films made by Romero in the Philippines primarily for distribution in the United States. These productions were aimed particularly at American drive-in theaters, rural cinemas and second-run theatres. Romero described much of this work as American films made in the Philippines, rather than as conventional Philippine–American co-productions.

The production arrangements developed from Romero's collaboration with American producer Kane W. Lynn. Their earlier Lynn–Romero partnership subsequently developed into Hemisphere Pictures, which maintained a production base in the Philippines while making films principally for the American market. Lim notes that Romero considered his familiarity with American popular culture and the English language useful when producing films intended for U.S. audiences.

The success of Brides of Blood contributed to the continuation of the Blood Island films. Beverly Miller, a Kansas-based film sub-distributor and drive-in operator, became involved with the series after the commercial performance of Brides of Blood and served as an associate producer on The Mad Doctor of Blood Island.

The score was composed by Tito Arévalo.

== Promotion ==
A prologue to the film invited theatergoers to partake in a bizarre initiation, and each patron was given a free packet of colored liquid labelled "green blood". At a certain point, the audience was told to "recite the oath of green blood" as they tore open the little packets and drank the colored liquid inside. By doing this, the viewer could safely watch "the unnatural green-blooded ones without fear of contamination". The prologue was shot at Clark Air Base in Manila using American teenagers.

Sam Sherman came up with the idea of distributing the liquid gel-packs to the theatergoers, and said years later in an interview that he drank one of the packets, which contained an aqua-colored gel, and it made him sick to his stomach. Nevertheless, Miller (an associate producer of the film) said he actually witnessed dozens of teenagers drinking the stuff in the theaters that he managed in Kansas City.

In another gimmick, the camera zoomed in and out rapidly each time the monster killed or stalked someone, a technique that some theatergoers complained made them dizzy and was actually designed to cover up the shoddy make-up effects.

== Release ==
The film was released in the U.S. in 1969 on a double feature with the 1967 West German film The Blood Demon. In 1969, a practice arose in some states (Rhode Island in particular) wherein the local newspapers began omitting the word "blood" from the titles of films they were advertising. In certain areas, Mad Doctor was advertised as The Mad Doctor of Crimson Island and The Blood Demon became The Crimson Demon, etc. This practice did not last very long, and by the time the sequel Beast of Blood was released, Hemisphere was again able to use the word "blood" in their titles.

Image Entertainment released Mad Doctor on DVD in 2002, featuring a commentary track by Sherman and an interview with Romero.

== Reception ==
Mad Doctor of Blood Island received mostly negative reviews from critics.

Dennis Schwartz from Ozus' World Movie Reviews awarded the film a C grade, calling it "dreary" and stating that the film "is as bad as it sounds". On his website Fantastic Movie Musings and Ramblings, Dave Sindelar called it " intermittently fun but intermittently disappointing as well". Paul Gaita from Allmovie liked the film. While noting the film's poor camerawork, Gaita stated that the film "has a loopy charm that will be best appreciated by fans of low-budget horror". TV Guide gave the film 1 out of 5 stars, criticizing the film's dialogue and overuse of zoom shots.

The film proved to be popular commercially, and was followed by the last film in the series, Beast of Blood (1970), which saw the return of the chlorophyll creature.

Romero later said of Mad Doctor: "We thought it was one of the worst things we ever did... I can't account for it [the film's impact]".

== Themes and analysis ==
Film scholar Bliss Cua Lim has discussed The Mad Doctor of Blood Island as part of the tradition of American jungle-horror and exploitation cinema. She identifies the Doctor Moreau narrative and King Kong as important influences on the Blood Island films, particularly their use of isolated tropical settings, scientific experimentation and the transformation of humans into monstrous creatures.

Lim also examines the film's mad-scientist narrative in relation to recurring themes in the Blood Island series. She argues that the attempts by scientists to transform or "improve" human subjects reflect themes found throughout the series, in which scientific experimentation produces creatures occupying a boundary between human and non-human forms.
