= The Scavengers (1959 film) =

- Theatrical release poster
- Directed by: John Cromwell
- Written by: Eddie Romero
- Produced by: Kane W. Lynn; Edgar F. Romero
- Starring: Vince Edwards; Carol Ohmart; Vic Diaz
- Cinematography: Felipe Sacdalan
- Edited by: Gervasio Santos
- Music by: Tito Arevalo
- Production companies: Lynn-Romero Productions; Independent International Pictures; Hemisphere Pictures
- Release date: October 1959
- Running time: 79 minutes
- Countries: Philippines; United States
- Language: English

The Scavengers is a 1959 crime film that was directed by John Cromwell, and starred Vince Edwards, Carol Ohmart and Vic Diaz. Shot on location in the Crown Colony of Hong Kong, it was produced by former US Navy fighter pilot Kane W. Lynn and Filipino director Eddie Romero (who also wrote the screenplay). It was released in December 1959 as a double feature in the U.S. with Terror Is a Man by Hal Roach's Valiant Pictures.

The Scavengers was re-released in 1963 as City of Sin by Lynn's new company, Hemisphere Pictures.

== Plot ==
Former Korean War pilot Stuart Allison has been searching the Orient for his wife who deserted him six years ago. Now running a smuggling operation in Hong Kong, he sights his wife Marian boarding a ferry to Macau. Allison is pursued by both the Royal Hong Kong Police and a mystery man named O'Hara, who inform him that his wife is now a cocaine addict and involved in smuggling stolen bonds embezzled by a missing former Nationalist Chinese general.

== Cast ==
- Vince Edwards as Stuart Allison
- Carol Ohmart as Marian Allison
- Richard Loo as General Woo
- Tamar Benamy as Marissa
- John Wallace ... Taggert
- Efren Reyes, Sr. as Puan
- Vic Diaz as Casimir O'Hara
- Mario Barri as Hong Kong Police Inspector
- Eddie Infante
- Renato Robles

== Production ==
The film was director John Cromwell's penultimate feature film. Making their debuts in the film were Jerusalem born dancer Tamar Benamy (born Tamar Ben-Ami March 9, 1937 - August 31, 1997) and RTHK broadcaster John Wallace, who also appeared in Ferry to Hong Kong. The film is credited as "introducing" Vic Diaz, though he had previously appeared in several Philippine films. Ohmart was cast by Cromwell, who had seen her in similar films.
