= Cavalry Command =

1958 film

- Directed by: Gerardo de Leon; Eddie Romero
- Written by: Eddie Romero
- Produced by: Cirio H. Santiago
- Starring: John Agar; Richard Arlen
- Cinematography: Felipe Sacdalan
- Edited by: Gervacio Santos; L.S. 'Ted' Smith
- Music by: Tito Arévalo; Ariston Avelino
- Production companies: Cirio H. Santiago Film Organization; Premiere Productions
- Distributed by: People's Pictures
- Release date: January 16, 1958
- Running time: 77 minutes
- Country: Philippines
- Language: English

Cavalry Command (also known as The Day of the Trumpet) is a 1958 Western film directed by Eddie Romero and starring John Agar, Richard Arlen and Myron Healey.

== Cast ==
- John Agar as Sgt. Judd Norcutt
- Richard Arlen as Sgt. Jim Heisler
- Myron Healey as Lt. Worth
- William Phipps as Pvt. Steve Haines
- Alicia Vergel as Laura
- Pancho Magalona as Captain Magno Maxalla
- Eddie Infante as San Pascual's Priest
- Cielito Legaspi as Clara
- Roy Planas as Tibo Maxalla
- Vic Diaz as Julio
