= Beast of Blood (film) =

1970 film by Eddie Romero

- Film poster
- Directed by: Eddie Romero
- Screenplay by: Eddie Romero
- Story by: Beverly Miller
- Produced by: Eddie Romero; Kane W. Lynn
- Starring: John Ashley; Celeste Yarnall; Eddie Garcia
- Cinematography: Justo Paulino
- Music by: Tito Arevalo
- Production company: Scepter Industries Production
- Distributed by: Hemisphere Pictures
- Release date: May 1970
- Running time: 90 minutes
- Country: Philippines
- Language: English
- Budget: Between US$125,000.00 to US$200,000.00 (estimated)

Beast of Blood, released in the UK as Blood Devils, is a 1970 Filipino horror film. A sequel to The Mad Doctor of Blood Island, it was directed by Eddie Romero. It was the fourth in a series of four Filipino horror films, produced by Romero and Kane W. Lynn, known as the "Blood Island" series, which also included Terror Is a Man, Brides of Blood and The Mad Doctor of Blood Island. It was also Romero's last film for Lynn's Hemisphere Pictures, as the two went their separate ways after this film was completed.

== Plot ==
The plot of this film picks up where The Mad Doctor of Blood Island leaves off. Upon leaving Blood Island, the ship carrying Dr. Bill Foster (John Ashley), Sheila Willard, her father and Carlos Lopez explodes and sinks after mutated "chlorophyll creature" Don Ramon Lopez (the titular "Beast") is found secreted on board and goes on a rampage, destroying the ship. The monstrous Don Ramon washes up back on Blood Island and heads into the jungle. Dr. Foster is the only other survivor, and after a few months recovering in a hospital, he heads back to Blood Island on another ship. On board is reporter Myra Russell (Celeste Yarnall), who is investigating the explosion of the ship.

When Foster and Russell arrive on the island, they find the natives in a state of fear, believing that the old Lopez mansion is cursed. With the village headman Ramu (Alfonso Carvajal) and the ship's captain (played by co-producer Beverly Miller), they search the house and find Razak (Bruno Punzalan) alive. The "green men" return and after a fight, Myra is captured and taken to the evil Dr. Lorca (Eddie Garcia), who is still alive, but horribly scarred from his seeming demise in the earlier film.

Dr. Foster and Laida (Liza Belmonte) search the mountains and find Dr. Lorca's hidden lab. Laida goes back to the village for help and Lorca shows Foster his latest experiments. He has removed Don Ramon's head and has attached it to machines, while the decapitated body remains strapped to a table. Lorca knows the head can speak, but it refuses to say anything.

The captain, Laida and Ramu lead an attack on Lorca's headquarters and fight with his men. Laida finds her father, who shows signs of the chlorophyll poisoning, and rescues him. Foster shoots Razak. Don Ramon's head controls his body from afar and wills it to attack and apparently kill Dr. Lorca, crushing his head with a piece of machinery. Lorca's lab explodes, killing all inside, and Foster and the group leave with a box of Dr. Lorca's papers and notes.

== Cast ==
- John Ashley as Dr. Bill Foster
- Celeste Yarnall as Myra J. Russell
- Eddie Garcia as Dr. Lorca
- Liza Belmonte as Laida
- Alfonso Carvajal as Ramu
- Bruno Punzalan as Razak
- Angel Buenaventura
- Beverly Miller as the captain
- Johnny Long

== Production ==
The film's budget has been estimated at between $125,000 to $200,000. Actor Ronald Remy did not return to play Dr. Lorca as he had in Mad Doctor of Blood Island, so in Beast of Blood, Garcia played the mad doctor. Co-producer Beverly Miller played the ship's captain.

To promote the film, the producers had fake $10 bills printed that folded in half, revealing an ad flier for Beast of Blood when opened. The phony bills were then scattered all over the surrounding neighborhood nearest the drive-in that was playing the film. Jim Arena said, "The poster for the film depicted the chlorophyll monster gruesomely ripping its own head off! This horrific drawing eventually became better known than the film itself. While no such scene actually exists in the picture, it is the kind of tantalizing movie promotion that helped get those cars lining up at the drive-in".

== Release ==
The film was released in 1970 on a double feature with Curse of the Vampires, a 1966 Filipino horror film that was directed by Gerardo de Leon. Beast of Blood did substantial business in New York theaters, and producer Lynn (as Hemisphere Pictures) looked forward to getting the distribution rights to Ashley's next horror film, titled Beast of the Yellow Night. However, Ashley and his own production company, Four Associates Ltd., put up the money to produce the film themselves with director Romero, and Ashley cut a deal with Roger Corman's then-fledgling New World Pictures to distribute it. After Beast of Blood, Lynn found himself cut out of the deal entirely.

=== Critical response ===
TV Guide awarded the film one out of four stars, calling it "ridiculous" and criticized the film's poor make-up effects and production values. The featured review on IMDb states ""Beast of Blood" is far from horrible, but it's the weakest entry in the series, as it showing that the creators have milked the concept dry-in spite of some nice moments"
