= Ganito Kami Noon... Paano Kayo Ngayon? =

1976 period drama film by Eddie Romero

- Theatrical release poster
- Directed by: Eddie Romero
- Written by: Roy C. Iglesias; Eddie Romero
- Produced by: Dennis Juban
- Starring: Christopher de Leon; Gloria Diaz
- Cinematography: Justo Paulino
- Edited by: Ben Barcelon
- Music by: Lutgardo Labad
- Production company: Hemisphere Pictures
- Distributed by: Hemisphere Pictures
- Release date: December 25, 1976
- Running time: 135 minutes
- Country: Philippines
- Languages: Filipino; English; Spanish

Ganito Kami Noon... Paano Kayo Ngayon? (lit. 'This Was How We Were Then... How Are You Doing Now?') is a 1976 Philippine period drama film directed by Eddie Romero from a story and screenplay he co-wrote with Roy C. Iglesias. Set in the end of Spanish colonization and the beginning of American colonization in the Philippines, it stars Christopher de Leon and Gloria Diaz in the lead roles. The film was selected as the Philippine entry for the Best Foreign Language Film at the 49th Academy Awards but was not accepted as a nominee.

In 2013, ABS-CBN Film Archives, in partnership with Central Digital Lab, digitally restored and remastered the film and was subsequently released in select theaters for a limited period. The digitally restored version was also released on DVD and iTunes. On the same year, the film was inscribed in the UNESCO Memory of the World National Register of the Philippines.

== Plot ==
Nicolas "Kulas" Ocampo, a young indio, lost his own mother, then he also lost his house to fire by leaving the stove open. He was forced to leave the countryside in search of temporary refuge and then, he finds a priest named Padre Gil Corcuera, who is hiding from a gang of bandits. They get to know each other, but Kulas ends up being whipped by a member of the Guardia Civil when Padre Corcuera told them that Kulas abducted him. Eventually, Padre Gil forgave him and he asked Kulas to take care of his illegitimate child Bindoy in Manila. On their way to the city, Kulas and Bindoy meet a group of traveling actors' troupe led by Fortunato "Atong" Capili. Kulas falls in love with its group member Matilde "Diding" Diaz. The troupe went to a town where they witnessed Filipino revolutionaries celebrating. Filipino revolutionaries arrested Atong while the rest were freed.

Kulas and Bindoy then met Lim, a Hokkien Chinese trader, Lim initially refused to let them in a casco bound for Manila however he quickly changed his mind and let them aboard. Kulas brought Bindoy to a church to bring him to his biological father; however, he was arrested by the Guardia Civil since he was accused of making false allegations. There in the prison, he met Onofre "Kidlat" Baltao. He was bailed by a Spanish mestizo lawyer, Don Tibor, who worked for Padre Corcuera. Kulas was given a massive fortune as a reward for bringing the boy to Manila. A party was commenced by Padre Corcuera and he sexually assaulted a female before tripping to an unconscious Kulas, who then thanked him for bringing him out of temptation.

Kulas brought Bindoy to school and Padre Corcuera said to him that he could not truly raise his son due to his status as a priest. He told of the war between the Americans and Spanish and reminded Kulas that he should never return to poverty. Kulas was assaulted by Kidlat and he was chased until he snuck in the theater, where he saw Diding working. Kulas was then interrogated by the Komandante, who then thanked Kulas for bringing leads for finding Kidlat. Kulas brought Diding to a restaurant and there she refused Kulas's hand. Kulas then followed Diding and angrily forced him to leave; however, Diding then got the help of Kulas and Don Tibor as she wanted to become part of a Zarzuela. Kulas then went to school where he admonished Bindoy for pulling a prank to his teacher.

Kulas then suddenly became depressed with his own life since he felt that his life was joyless. As the events unfold, Kulas tries to enjoy his new status as a rich person while injustices occurred outside of his house. One day, he was stolen from by Atong, who became poor. Atong was ashamed of his status however he reluctantly joined Kulas and there he reunited with his daughter Diding. Diding apparently left Kulas and Kulas decided to go to Don Tibor to find her. Diding went out to reveal herself to Kulas and Kulas felt betrayed, so he hit Don Tibor. The two decided to duel it out through fencing. The duel ended up becoming violent as it turned into a brawl, with Don Tibor almost getting killed. Atong revealed to Kulas that Diding was his adopted daughter, her being adopted at the age of fifteen.

Kulas learned about the arrival of the Americans in the country after one person reported the news to the other bar patrons. The person who reported was shot by another person after a fit of rage. Kulas then went home to rest and he was interrogated again by the Komandante if the person imprisoned was Kidlat. Kulas couldn't answer the question so he was imprisoned as well. Kidlat then decided to beat up Kulas and the guards decided to bring them to Fort Santiago. While going there, both Kidlat and Kulas decided to escape. The two then hid at Lim's house and there they rested. Kidlat overheard the conversation between Lim and the Chinese merchants, and he threatened to kill Lim; however, he calmed Kidlat and they hatched a plan.

The next day, Lim smuggled Kidlat and Kulas by claiming they were going to Mandaluyong; however, they were stopped by the Guardia Civil as there are Magdalo troops at the other side of the bridge the guards were positioned. The Guardia Civil was attacked by both the Magdalo and by Kidlat, Kulas, and Lim. Lim was killed in the ensuing gunfire and Kulas went back to Lim's house to report the passing of Lim. Kulas then decided to walk home and there he was asked by an American soldier. Kulas then fell unconscious and was brought to a hospital. Kulas then went home and there he was accused by Concordia of being a Spanish spy. Because of this, Kulas was kicked out of his own house.

Kulas saw Bindoy again after escaping from school after it was hit by a bomb. Bindoy told Kulas the whereabouts of Diding by telling him that she was in the theater. Kulas then fell unconscious as he was about to enter the theater. Kulas then woke up at Don Tibor's house after hearing gunshots from afar. Diding told Kulas that they were about to marry. Kulas and Don Tibor went to Kulas's house to regain his house. There Leonor was found raped then killed. Don Tibor fell from the stairs and suddenly became paralyzed. Don Tibor was brought to his home and there his wife planned on bringing him back to Iloilo. It was revealed that he was cheating on his wife with Diding. Don Tibor asked for forgiveness to Kulas and Kulas forgave him. Diding then revealed to Kulas that she left him just to be with Don Tibor.

Kulas went to Bindoy at his school and it was revealed that he is to stay at school for a long time, especially how the education system was changed. Kulas told Bindoy that even though he inherited a lot from his father, he could truly gain happiness by being of use to other people. Kulas went back to his house and told of his intention to Diding that he wanted to be a Filipino. Kulas then left his house, leaving behind Diding and walking to an abandoned field. Kulas then asked the children in the burning field and told them that they are now Filipinos. One child asked for his name and he said "Nicolas Ocampo". Kulas leaves them and walks away.

== Cast ==
- Christopher de Leon as Nicolas "Kulas" Ocampo:
  A naive indio who suddenly gained wealth.
- Gloria Diaz as Matilda 'Diding' Diaz Patron:
  Adopted daughter of Atong and the love interest of Kulas.
- Eddie Garcia as Don Tibor:
  A Visayan lawyer initially in service of Padre Corcuera, he helped Kulas in multiple circumstances.
- Dranreb Belleza as Bindoy:
  The illegitimate child of Padre Corcuera.
- Leopoldo Salcedo as Fortunato "Atong" Capili:
  Head of a travelling actors' troupe
- Rosemarie Gil as Concordia:
  The main servant of Kulas's household.
- Johnny Vicar as Onofre "Kidlat" Baltao:
  Criminal who was imprisoned in the same cell as Kulas, assaulted Kulas later in the movie.
- Tsing Tong Tsai as Lim:
  A Chinese Merchant who helped bring Kulas and Bindoy to Manila.
- E.A. Rocha as Padre Gil Corcuera:
  A priest who initially accused Kulas of being a bandit, gave him much of his wealth.
- Jaime Fabregas as Komandante:
  A high-ranking official of the Guardia Civil
- George Albert Romero
- Peque Gallaga as Spanish Officer
- Odette Khan as Doña Trining:
  Tibor's wife.
- Laida Lim-Perez as Lim's wife
- Teresita Non as Leonor:
  Concordia's daughter.
- Joey Romero as Soldier

== Digital restoration and legacy ==
The film was restored in 2013 by the ABS-CBN Film Archives and Central Digital Lab. It took 2,479 manual hours to restore the film and 80 hours for color grading. During its restoration, the film print has noticeable impairments such as heavy splices, scratches, and breathing. Joey Romero, son of Eddie Romero and cameo actor for the film, helped with the color grading process and was personally involved in its restoration and technical run. The only extant 35mm copy of the film was found in the collection of the Cultural Center of the Philippines and the ABS-CBN Film Restoration borrowed and used it for restoration. The original mono audio was lifted from the Betacam copy and restored and upgraded to stereo by ABS-CBN Audio Post.

The film has been inscribed in the National Memory of the World Register of the Philippines.

=== Television broadcast ===
The digitally restored and remastered high-definition version of the film received a free-to-air television premiere on ABS-CBN on June 4, 2017, as a feature presentation for the network's Sunday late-night special presentation program Sunday's Best for coinciding the 119th anniversary of Philippine independence from Spain. The showing received a nationwide household rating of 2.8%, winning against GMA Network's broadcast of Diyos at Bayan, which attained a 0.9% rating.

On September 2, 2018, ABS-CBN aired the film for the second time as part of the 42nd anniversary celebration of the film's release. The second broadcast of the film received a nationwide household rating of 2.0%, winning against GMA's broadcast of the episode of Diyos at Bayan, "SOGIE, Kailangan Pa Ba?" that attained a 0.6% rating.

On June 30, 2019, ABS-CBN re-aired the film for the third time as a tribute to Eddie Garcia, who died on June 20 from a coma after an accident where he tripped on a cable wire during shooting for GMA Network's now-canceled drama Rosang Agimat. The film received a nationwide household rating of 1.6%, losing against GMA Network's showing of the 2003 Chinese action-adventure film, Warriors of Heaven and Earth which attained a rating of 3.2%.

== Awards ==
Year	Award	Category	Nominee	Result
1976	Metro Manila Film Festival	Best Film	Ganito Kami Noon, Paano Kayo Ngayon	Won
1976	Metro Manila Film Festival	Best Director	Eddie Romero	Won
1976	Metro Manila Film Festival	Best Actor	Christopher de Leon	Won
1976	Metro Manila Film Festival	Best Screenplay	Eddie Romero & Roy C. Iglesias	Won
1976	Metro Manila Film Festival	Best Music	Lutgardo Labad	Won
1976	Metro Manila Film Festival	Best Art Direction	Laida Lim-Perez & Peque Gallaga	Won

== See also ==
- List of Memory of the World Documentary Heritage in the Philippines
- Aguila (film)
- Kamakalawa
