= Ang Kamay ng Diyos =

- Directed by: Enrigue Moreno
- Written by: Eddie Romero
- Starring: Gerry De Leon; Kaycee Romano; Leopoldo Salcedo
- Music by: Tito Arevalo
- Distributed by: Sampaguita Pictures
- Release date: December 19, 1947
- Country: Philippines
- Language: Filipino

Ang Kamay ng Diyos (lit. 'The Hand of God') is a 1947 Philippine drama film directed by Eddie Romero. It was the first film ever directed by him.

== Cast ==
- Gerry De Leon
- Kaycee Romano
- Leopoldo Salcedo
