= The Passionate Strangers =

- Directed by: Eddie Romero
- Written by: Eddie Romero
- Produced by: M. J. Parsons
- Starring: Michael Parsons; Vic Diaz; Volora Noland; Mario Montenegro
- Cinematography: Justo Paulino
- Edited by: Ben Barcelon
- Music by: Nestor Robles
- Production company: MJP Productions
- Distributed by: RAF Industries
- Release date: April 20, 1966
- Running time: 78 minutes
- Countries: Philippines; United States
- Languages: English; Filipino

The Passionate Strangers is a 1966 film produced by M. J. Parsons and was written and directed by Eddie Romero. Cesar Amigo and Reuben Canoy wrote the screenplay, and Eddie Romero developed the story. Nestor Robles created the soundtrack for the film. It starred Michael Parsons, Mario Montenegro and Vic Diaz. Turner Classic Movies states the film was released in the United States in 1968 with a 78-minute running time.

== Plot ==
When an old man who was working to settle a local labor dispute is murdered and his body is left lying along a roadside, everyone assumes the unsolved killing was ordered by union officials, and a riot ensues among the workers. In actuality, the old man was killed by a jealous husband named Adam Courtney (Michael Parsons) who was questioning him to learn if the old man's nephew was his wife's secret lover. A young boy is later charged with the murder, and the boy's friend Yoyong (who is the town drunk) begs Mr. Courtney to confess. Courtney's wife Margaret tells him to tell everyone that she was cheating on him and that the killing was accidental, but Courtney refuses to tell anyone in the town about her illicit relationship. He winds up being stabbed to death by Yoyong, which puts a quick end to the matter.

== Cast ==
- Michael Parsons as Mr. Courtney
- Volora Noland as his wife Margaret
- Jose Dagumboy as Yoyong the drunk
- Mario Montenegro
- Butch Aquino
- Vic Diaz as the lawyer
- Celia Rodriguez
- Bong Calumpang as the young boy
- Claude Wilson
- Cesar Aguilar
