= Kane W. Lynn =

American film producer (1919–1975)

- Born: 1919; United States
- Died: 1975 (aged 55–56)
- Occupation: Film producer

Kane W. Lynn (1919–1975) was an American film producer who made a number of movies in the Philippines with producer Irwin Pizor and Filipino director Eddie Romero as Hemisphere Pictures, or the House of Horror as they often referred to themselves. Later Pizor quit the company after an argument, and when Romero left to form a production company with actor John Ashley, Lynn tired of making movies and his Hemisphere Pictures became just a movie distributor, mainly handling adult films and low budget B-movies. It was his guidance that kept Hemisphere Pictures solvent and constantly moving forward, releasing a diverse product line of low-budget independent movies from the early 1960s through the mid-1970s.

== Biography ==
Lynn was a U.S. naval pilot stationed in the Philippines during the second World War and flew a number of missions into Southeast Asia. When the war ended, he decided to live in the Philippines and got a job working for the Navy as a technical adviser on a Hollywood TV show called Navy Log in 1955. Lynn decided to get into the motion picture industry after he met Filipino filmmaker Eddie Romero and the two became very good friends.

They decided to produce three films together under the banner of Lynn-Romero Productions....Lost Battalion, The Scavengers, and the first film in what would become known as the Blood Island series, Terror Is a Man. Worried that their films weren't doing well in the United States and other English-speaking countries, beginning with Terror Is a Man, Kane Lynn imported some internationally known stars to appear in his films, such as Francis Lederer and Greta Thyssen. Lynn journeyed to New York in 1963 to meet producer Irwin Pizor of Screen Guild Productions, who agreed to set up a filmmaking partnership with Lynn and Romero to be called "Hemisphere Pictures".

They made three more films that didn't do well, Raiders of Leyte Gulf, The Walls of Hell and Moro Witch Doctor. They later made another war film together in 1965 called The Ravagers which starred John Saxon. Film distributor Sam Sherman, who was in charge of creating Hemisphere's advertising material at the time, advised them to quit making war movies and concentrate on making horror films instead, like their critically acclaimed Terror Is a Man. Hemisphere released a 1964 Filipino vampire film called Kulay dugo ang gabi (Blood is the Color of Night) in 1966 and retitled it The Blood Drinkers. Parts of the film, which had been directed by Eddie Romero's friend Gerardo de Leon, were in black-and-white, so Lynn had those scenes tinted either red or blue so he could advertise the film as being "in Blood-Dripping Color".

Hemisphere also distributed Al Adamson's film Psycho A-Go-Go in 1965, the film that was re-edited years later by Adamson and re-released as Blood of Ghastly Horror. Although Terror Is a Man had already been syndicated to television, Sam Sherman agreed to re-release it theatrically in 1969 if Lynn retitled the film Blood Creature.

In 1968, Lynn had Eddie Romero direct Brides of Blood and hired American actor John Ashley to star. Lynn, Romero and Ashley would also reunite to make two more Blood Island films, Mad Doctor of Blood Island (1969) and Beast of Blood (1970). Following Beast of Blood, Kane Lynn later broke up with Irwin Pizor after an argument regarding finances, and Eddie Romero and John Ashley formed their own production company to produce films together in the Philippines into the 1970s, such as Beast of the Yellow Night and The Twilight People.

Lynn (now as "Hemisphere Pictures") put money into a 1971 American horror film produced by Sam Sherman and Al Adamson called Brain of Blood. They released it in 1971 on a double bill with Lynn's The Blood Drinkers, now retitled The Vampire People.

After 1971, with John Ashley and Eddie Romero setting up their own production deals with Roger Corman, and Brain of Blood's disappointing performance at the box office, Hemisphere (which was now basically just Kane Lynn operating the company by himself) gave up on producing horror films and turned to distributing adult films to American theaters in the 1970s, such as The Swingin' Stewardesses, The Young Seducers, and Naughty Roommates. Hemisphere purchased the TV rights to The Cisco Kid TV show and made a few puppet films as well.

Kane Lynn died of cancer in 1975, and the company was taken over by its creditors, who released one last film before declaring bankruptcy, Mysteries of the Gods, a documentary narrated by William Shatner.

== Select filmography (as producer) ==
- Lost Battalion (1960)
- The Scavengers (1959) re-released later as City of Sin
- Terror Is a Man (1959) re-released later as Blood Creature
- The Raiders of Leyte Gulf (1963)
- The Walls of Hell (1964) a.k.a. Intramuros
- Moro Witch Doctor (1964) a.k.a. Amuck
- The Ravagers (1965)
- The Blood Drinkers (1966) a.k.a. Blood is the Color of Night; re-released later as The Vampire People
- Brides of Blood (1968) a.k.a. Brides of the Beast, a.k.a. The Brides of Blood Island
- Mad Doctor of Blood Island (1969) aka Tomb of the Living Dead
- Beast of Blood (1970) a.k.a. Blood Devils (U.K.)
- Brain of Blood (1971)
