= Only the Brave Know Hell =

1965 Filipino-American film directed by Eddie Romero

- United States theatrical release poster
- Directed by: Eddie Romero
- Written by: Cesar J. Amigo; E.F. Romero
- Produced by: Eddie Romero; Kane W. Lynn
- Starring: John Saxon; Fernando Poe Jr.; Bronwyn FitzSimons
- Cinematography: Mars Rasca
- Edited by: Joven Calub
- Music by: Tito Arevalo
- Production companies: Hemisphere Pictures; Filipinas Productions
- Distributed by: Hemisphere Pictures; Independent-International Pictures Corp.; New Gold Entertainment
- Release dates: February 7, 1965 (Philippines); November 24, 1965 (Boston); December 1965 (United States)
- Running time: 88 minutes
- Countries: Philippines; United States
- Languages: English; Filipino; Japanese

Only the Brave Know Hell (released in the United States as The Ravagers) is a 1965 war drama film directed by Eddie Romero and co-written by Romero and Cesar Amigo, starring John Saxon, Fernando Poe Jr. and Vic Diaz. It was produced by Hemisphere Pictures, which consisted of Eddie Romero, Kane W. Lynn and Irwin Pizor. In the Philippines, the Pilipino-language version was entitled Hanggang May Kalaban (lit. 'Until There Are Enemies') while the English-dubbed version was entitled Only the Brave Know Hell, both of which were released in February 1965, while in the United States, it was released as The Ravagers in December 1965.

The film is set in the Philippines during World War II. It is about a band of brave Filipino guerrillas who battle with the last remaining Japanese occupation forces. The film was advertised as "the biggest war film ever filmed in the Philippines". Lead actress Bronwyn FitzSimons was the daughter of actress Maureen O'Hara.

It was one of several war movies Saxon made outside Hollywood.

== Plot ==
In the year 1945, The commandant of the Japanese forces occupying the Philippines is ordered to transport a shipment of gold bullion back to Japan. The Japanese soldiers take over a convent where the gold shipment is situated, and take a number of nuns and young girls prisoner in the process. Unbeknownst to the Japanese, one of the captive women is actually a female American agent named Sheila (Bronwyn FitzSimons), whom the Japanese have been looking to capture.

Kermit Dowling (John Saxon), a USAFFE officer, together with an ex-convict named Gaudiel (Fernando Poe Jr.), leads a group of Filipino guerillas in an attack on the convent. Gaudiel finds himself attracted to Sheila. The guerillas beat the Japanese troops in a fierce battle and liberate the convent, saving the gold shipment.

== Cast ==
- John Saxon as Capt. Kermit Dowling
- Fernando Poe Jr. as Sgt. Rubinio Gaudiel
- Bronwyn FitzSimons as Sheila Ryan
- Robert Arevalo as Capt. Araulio
- Jose Dagumboy as Joe
- Vic Diaz as Cruz
- Michael Parsons as Reardon
- Kristina Scott as Mother-Superior
- Vic Silayan as Capt. Mori
- Ann Saxon

== See also ==
- The Walls of Hell
- Manila, Open City
- Santiago! (film)
- Aguila (film)
