= The Raiders of Leyte Gulf =

- Directed by: E.F. Romero
- Written by: Carl Kuntze
- Screenplay by: Eddie Romero
- Produced by: Eddie Romero; Irwin Pizor; Kane W. Lynn
- Starring: Leopoldo Salcedo; Michael Parsons; Liza Moreno
- Cinematography: Arsenio Doña; Felipe Sacdalan
- Edited by: Eddie Romero
- Music by: Tito Arevalo
- Production companies: Independent-International Pictures; Cirio H. Santiago Film Organization; Eddie Romero Production; Lynro; Manhattan Productions
- Distributed by: Hemisphere Pictures
- Release dates: August 22, 1962 (Philippines); August 19, 1963 (U.S.)
- Running time: 80 minutes
- Countries: Philippines; United States
- Language: English

The Raiders of Leyte Gulf is a 1962 Philippine–American War film directed by Eddie Romero. It was the first film produced by the newly formed Hemisphere Pictures, a three-way partnership involving Filipino director Eddie Romero, American producers Kane W. Lynn and Irwin Pizor. It was written by Eddie Romero and Carl Kuntze

== Synopsis ==
The film is set against the Japanese occupation of the Philippines in World War II. An American spy, Emmett Wilson, is captured by the Japanese while making a reconnaissance of Leyte in preparation for the planned American invasion of the island. When torture fails to loosen his tongue, his Japanese captors begin executing one Filipino citizen each day, until Wilson talks. Lieut. Robert Grimm parachutes into the forest held by the local Filipino resistance and persuades the guerrillas to attack the Japanese camp and rescue Wilson. But the rescue attempt fails, and as more innocent prisoners continue to die, Wilson decides to tell the vile Captain Akira what he wants to know. A Filipino citizen manages to shoot Wilson, suspecting him of collaborating with the enemy. Before Akira can regroup his forces, the guerrillas pull off a second rescue attempt, this one successful. As Wilson dies, he kills Akira with a bayonet, and the Japanese forces are smashed by the Filipinos, paving the way for General Douglas MacArthur's invasion forces.

== Cast ==
- Leopoldo Salcedo
- Michael Parsons
- Liza Moreno
- Jennings Sturgeon
- Eddie Mesa
- Efren Reyes
- Oscar Keesee

== Promotion ==
The film did well overseas but did not make much money at all in the United States. Kane Lynn arranged a daring publicity stunt at a Texas drive-in theater in which a man would jump out of a plane and parachute down into the drive-in lot. A large crowd of people showed up to watch the stunt, but left the lot as soon as it was over without staying to see the film.

== Filming ==
It was filmed on location in Binangonan, Rizal, Philippines.
