= 1953 FAMAS Awards =

Annual Filipino awards for achievements in film

1st FAMAS Awards
- Date: Thursday, July 16, 1953
- Site: Hotel Riviera Mansion; Dewey Boulevard; Manila

Highlights
- Best Picture: Sawa sa Lumang Simboryo

Television coverage
- Network: Radio Stations: DZBB, DZFM, DZPI, DCBC

The 1st Filipino Academy of Movie Arts and Sciences Awards Night was held on July 16, 1953, in Hotel Riviera Mansion, Dewey Boulevard (now Roxas Boulevard) honoring the best achievements of Filipino films in 1952. Sawa sa Lumang Simboryo produced by Manuel Vistan Jr. is the first recipient of FAMAS Award for Best Picture.

== Awards ==
Winners are listed first, highlighted with boldface and indicated with a double dagger (‡). Nominees are also listed if applicable.

Best Picture	Best Director
**Sawa sa Lumang Simboryo — Premiere Productions, Inc.**‡; Ang Bagong Umaga — Premiere Productions, Inc.; Basahang Ginto — Sampaguita Pictures; Korea — LVN Pictures	**Gerardo de Leon — Ang Bagong Umaga**‡
Best Actor	Best Actress
**Ben Perez — Ang Bagong Umaga**‡	**Alicia Vergel — Basahang Ginto**‡; Celia Flor — Correccional; Anita Linda — Sawa sa Lumang Simboryo
Best Supporting Actor	Best Supporting Actress
**Gil de Leon — Korea**‡; Max Alvarado — Sawa sa Lumang Simboryo	**Nida Blanca — Korea**‡; Rita Gomez — Sawa sa Lumang Simboryo
Best Screenplay	Best Cinematography
**Eddie Romero, Cesar Amigo — Buhay Alamang**‡; Benigno Aquino Jr. — Korea	**Emmanuel I. Rojas — Sawa sa Lumang Simboryo** ‡
Best Sound Engineering	Best Musical Score
**Charles Gray — Kalbaryo ni Hesus**‡	**Julio Esteban Anguita — Kalbaryo ni Hesus**‡
