= Beast of the Yellow Night =

1971 Filipino-American horror film

- Theatrical release poster
- Directed by: Eddie Romero
- Written by: Eddie Romero
- Produced by: Eddie Romero; John Ashley; David J. Cohen; Roger Corman; Beverly Miller
- Starring: John Ashley; Vic Diaz
- Cinematography: Justo Paulino
- Edited by: Ben Barcelon
- Music by: Nestor Robles
- Production companies: Four Associates Ltd; Cinema Projects International
- Distributed by: New World Pictures (U.S.)
- Release date: 1971
- Running time: 87 minutes
- Countries: Philippines; United States
- Languages: Filipino; English
- Budget: US$200,000 or US$60,000

Beast of the Yellow Night is a 1971 horror film, directed by Eddie Romero and starring John Ashley, who co-produced the film with Romero. It was the fourth release for Roger Corman's distribution company New World Pictures. It was released as a double feature with the West German horror film, Creature with the Blue Hand.

After successfully distributing Beast of Blood in 1970, producer Kane W. Lynn (as Hemisphere Pictures) tried to get the distribution rights to Ashley's next horror film, titled Beast of the Yellow Night. Ashley and his production company Four Associates Ltd. put up the money to produce the film themselves in the Philippines, and instead of allowing Lynn to distribute it, he made a deal with Roger Corman's then-fledgling New World Pictures instead. Lynn's ex-business partner in Hemisphere Pictures, Eddie Romero, was hired to direct and co-produce, but Lynn was cut out of the deal. Ashley's Four Associates Ltd. went on to produce several other films in the Philippines, such as The Twilight People, The Woman Hunt and Ebony, Ivory & Jade, before disbanding. Lynn invested in Sam Sherman's 1971 sci-fi film Brain of Blood, which did not fare well, and died soon after of cancer in 1975.

== Plot ==
The film is set near the end of World War II in the Philippines. Satan (Vic Diaz) saves murderer Joseph Langdon (John Ashley) from death on condition that he become his disciple. Satan has Langdon inhabit the bodies of several people over the years, bringing out the latent evil of those around them and carrying out the devil's evil deeds for the next 25 years. Inhabiting the body of Phillip Rogers and with his face, Langdon tries to exert his own free will, but becomes a hairy, murderous beast — a werewolf on the rampage — and kills several people. His wife Julia (Mary Wilcox) tries to support and comfort him during the day, as does his brother Earl (Ken Metcalfe), but when he meets blind former bandit Sabasas Nan (Andres Centenera), he starts to find the strength to fight back. Inspector de Santos (Leopoldo Salcedo) recognizes Rogers as being Langdon and takes him into custody, putting him under house arrest. Rogers attempts to make love to his wife, but changes again and escapes. When he and Nan try to leave the city, they encounter the police and military, and Rogers changes again, battling against the combined forces. When a gravely wounded Sabasas Nan asks Rogers to pray for him, he does so, and at that moment, he is shot by Lt. Campos, dies, and reverts to his true age, his soul now free.

== Cast ==
- John Ashley as Joseph Langdon/Philip Rogers
- Mary Charlotte Wilcox as Julia Rogers (as Mary Wilcox)
- Leopoldo Salcedo as Inspector Santos
- Eddie Garcia as Det. Lt. Campo
- Ken Metcalfe as Earl Rogers
- Vic Diaz as Satan
- Andres Centenera as blind man
- Ruben Rustia as hospital doctor
- Don Lipman as U.S. military attaché
- Jose Garcia
- James Spencer
- Carpi Asturias as Langdon's jungle contact
- Jose Roy Jr.
- Criselda
- Joonee Gamboa as Mateo
- Peter Magurean
- Nora Nuñez
- Johnny Long

== Production ==
Ashley said that playing the role of the monster "was a lot of fun to do. I used a double in the long shots but the scenes where the beast was talking...was me." Ashley later said that the film was among the better written of his Philippines films. "It certainly was the most cerebral, if you can call any of those pictures that", he said. The success of the movie led Corman to make a series of films in the Philippines, including The Big Doll House.

== Release ==
Beast of the Yellow Night was released in 1971 in the US. "We really tried for quality", Romero said later. "I don't think it did very well. They [the audience] prefer out and out gore."

Diabolique magazine wrote that "The film is a lot of fun, and Ashley's performance is good – he's not playing a stock leading man character this time, but a tormented killer redeemed by love for his new wife. It was a financial success and launched Ashley as a producer, while confirming his status as a draw in horror movies."

=== Home video ===
Beast of the Yellow Night was released on DVD by Ventura Distribution on August 21, 2001. The film was reissued several times after its initial DVD release, usually as part of a multi-disc combo pack. It was last released by VCI Video as a part of a four-disc combo pack.

== Reception ==
Beast of the Yellow Night received mostly negative reviews upon its release. Linda Gross of the Los Angeles Times called it a "confusing, implausible rather poorly made horror film", although she admitted it had "a nice twist" showing "two kinds of caring: that of a woman whose love implies expectations and that of a friend who wants nothing and is thereby able to give more." Graeme Clark of The Spinning Image rated the film three out of 10 stars, criticizing the film's overly talky and confusing script.

== Legacy ==
Ashley later became a producer on The A Team television series. He made a cameo in an episode as a backer of a horror film called The Beast of the Yellow Night.

In 2014, Michael J. Nelson, Kevin Murphy and Bill Corbett of movie mocking commentary RiffTrax riffed the film as part of their repertoire.

== See also ==
- List of American films of 1971
