= Escape to Paradise (disambiguation) =

Escape to Paradise is a 1939 American film directed by Erle C. Kenton.

Escape to Paradise may also refer to:

== Film ==
- Escape to Paradise (1960 film), the original Filipino title of Lost Battalion

== Music ==
- Escape to Paradise, a classical album by Daniel Hope, 2014
- "Escape to Paradise", a song by DJ Quicksilver, 1998
