= 1967 FAMAS Awards =

Annual Filipino film awards ceremony

15th FAMAS Awards
- Date: 1967
- Site: Philippines

Highlights
- Best Picture: Ito ang Pilipino (Emar Pictures)
- Most awards: The Passionate Strangers (MJP Productions) (6 wins)

The 15th Filipino Academy of Movie Arts and Sciences Awards Night was held 1n 1967 for the Outstanding Achievements for the year 1966.

Among the many films that was nominated that year, only two films went home victorious after winning almost all of the awards. Ito ang Pilipino of Emar Pictures won 5 FAMAS Awards including the FAMAS Award for Best Picture and Best Actor for Joseph Estrada. The Passionate Strangers on the other hand, won most of the technical Awards including the best director for Eddie Romero. Apart from these two films, Ibulong Mo sa Hangin was the only film to win a FAMAS for its lead star Amalia Fuentes.

== Awards ==
=== Major Awards ===
Winners are listed first and highlighted with boldface.

Best Picture	Best Director
**Ito ang Pilipino — Emar Pictures.**; The Passionate Strangers — MJP Productions; Dugo ang Kulay ng Pag-ibig — Dramatic Films; ibulong mo sa Hangin — AM Productions; Sabotage — Tagalog Ilang-ilang Productions	**Eddie Romero — The Passionate Strangers**; Efren Reyes — Dugo ang Kulay ng Pag-ibig; Gerardo de Leon— Ibulong mo sa Hangin; Cesar Gallardo — Ito ang Pilipino; Eddie Garcia — Sabotage
Best Actor	Best Actress
**Joseph Estrada — Ito ang Pilipino**; Efren Reyes — Dugo ang Kulay ng Pag-ibig; Ronald remy — Flight of the Sparrow; Eddie Rodriguez — Ang Iniluluha ko'y Dugo; Michael Parsons — The Passionate Strangers; Tony Ferrer — Sabotage	**Amalia Fuentes — Ibulong mo sa Hangin**; Charito Solis — Claudia; Lolita Rodriguez — Dugo ang Kulay ng Pag-ibig; Barbara Perez — Ito ang Pilipino; Rita Gomez — Makasalanan
Best Supporting Actor	Best Supporting Actress
**Eddie Garcia — Ito ang Pilipino**; Bert Leroy Jr. — Bakit Pa Ako Isinilang; Lauro Delgado — Claudia; Johnny Monteiro — Ibulong Mo Sa Hangin; Joe Sison — Sabotage; Lito Anzures — Zamboanga	**Celia Rodriguez — The Passionate Strangers**; Rosa Mia — Bakit pa Ako Isinilang; Lucita Soriano — Dugo ang Kulay ng Pag-ibig; Mary Walter — Ibulong mo sa Hangin; Gloria Sevilla — Ito ang Pilipino
Best in Screenplay	Best Story
**Eddie Romero — The Passionate Strangers**	**Augusto Buenaventura — Ito ang Pilipino**
Best Sound Engineering	Best Musical Score
**Demetrio de Santos — The Passionate Strangers**	**Nestor Robles — The Passionate Strangers**
Best Cinematography	Best Editing
**Felipe Sacdalan — Ito ang Pilipino**	**Ben Barcelon — The Passionate Strangers**
