= The Brides of Blood Island =

- US theatrical release poster
- Directed by: Eddie Romero; Gerardo de Leon
- Written by: Cesar J. Amigo
- Produced by: Eddie Romero; Kane W. Lynn; Irwin Pizor
- Starring: John Ashley; Kent Taylor; Beverly Hills; Eva Darren; Mario Montenegro
- Production companies: Hemisphere Pictures; Filipinas Productions
- Distributed by: Udia Film Exchange; Hemisphere Pictures
- Release dates: 1966 (Philippines); May 28, 1968 (United States)
- Running time: 97 minutes
- Country: Philippines
- Language: English
- Budget: US$75,000.00

The Brides of Blood Island (released internationally as Brides of Blood, as well as Brides of the Beast, Danger on Tiki Island and Grave Desires) is a 1966 Filipino horror film directed by Eddie Romero and Gerardo de Leon from a screenplay by Cesar J. Amigo, and starring John Ashley, Kent Taylor, Beverly Hills, Eva Darren and Mario Montenegro. It was the first movie that Ashley made in the Philippines, beginning a long association between Ashley and that country. The Brides of Blood Island was the second in a series of four horror films produced by Romero and Kane W. Lynn known as the "Blood Island" series, which also included Terror Is a Man, The Mad Doctor of Blood Island and Beast of Blood. Brides of Blood was later released to television syndication in some areas as Island of Living Horror.

== Plot ==
Three Americans arrive on a tropical island: Dr. Paul Henderson, a scientist investigating radiation from atomic bomb tests; his beautiful but sexually frustrated wife, Carla; and Jim Farrell, a young Peace Corps representative. The captain tells his passengers that the island is cursed and is known as "Blood Island". The trio comes upon a funeral procession being conducted by the local natives. The two bodies headed for burial have been completely dismembered. The Americans are greeted by Arcadio, the tribe's elder, and his granddaughter Alma. Alma acts as Jim's interpreter for the natives, but remains secretive about what has everyone on edge.

The villagers choose two of the village maidens to participate in a ritual. The Americans are invited by Goro to visit the home of his master, Esteban Powers, a handsome young man who invites them to stay with him. Jim declines, but Carla insists that she and Paul stay. Esteban suffers from migraines, and reveals that the natives were all moved to the island after the atomic bomb tests; while they seem unaffected by the fallout, the flora and fauna of the island seem to have been altered. The group is startled to discover that the youthful-looking Esteban is actually 50 years old. On their way back to the village, a banana tree grabs Carla with its branches, but Jim and Paul rescue her. A butterfly transforms into a fanged monster and bites Paul on the hand.

In the village, two women are shackled to an altar and stripped of their clothes. Inside a hut with Arcadio and Alma, the Americans hear a strange sound emanating from the jungle, but they are warned not to leave the hut. Outside, a deformed humanoid beast emerges from the jungle and dismembers the two naked women. The next morning, Alma tells Jim that the beast only wants women; the mutilations are its means of sexual satisfaction. She tells him that if they do not continue to sacrifice girls to the creature, it will go berserk and destroy them all.

Paul realizes the animals on the island have the ability to change from their normal state into monstrous forms. The villagers select two more sacrifices by lottery; this time, Alma is chosen. Jim attempts to intervene, but Arcadio and the tribesmen tie him up. At Esteban's house, Carla desires sex, but cannot get her husband interested. She sneaks down the hall to Esteban's bedroom, where she finds him writhing on his bed. When she tries to get into bed with him, his servant Goro appears and forces her to leave the room.

While the villagers await the arrival of the beast, Jim escapes and rescues Alma by firing a flare gun at the creature before it can dismember her. The villagers are furious that Jim intervened, and chase Jim and Alma into the jungle. The duo flee through the monstrous vegetation and return to Esteban's house. Esteban tells them that he and his wife were exposed to radiation during the atomic bomb tests. While he only suffers with migraines, it caused his wife to suffer fatal seizures. That night, Carla sees Esteban stagger out of the house, and she follows him into the jungle, unaware that he is the beast of the island, a transformation he undergoes after each migraine. After an encounter with some monstrous trees and carnivorous plants, Carla is violently dismembered by the monster.

Paul, Jim and Alma search for Carla. Goro chases them with a machete and kills Paul. Jim and Alma find some carnivorous trees devouring what is left of Carla's body. They return to the village, pursued by the monster. Jim convinces the villagers to fight the monster instead of appeasing it. They corner the creature in a grass hut and set it afire. The villagers watch as Esteban, back in human form, stumbles out of the hut and dies. The village celebrates their freedom by holding a love ritual. As the natives pair off and go into the jungle for some wild lovemaking, Alma becomes enraptured by the music as well, and selects Jim as her mate, and the two slip off into the jungle together.

== Cast ==
- Kent Taylor as Dr. Paul Henderson
- Beverly Hills (aka Beverly Powers) as Carla Henderson
- John Ashley as Jim Farrell
- Eva Darren as Alma
- Mario Montenegro as Esteban Powers
- Oscar Kesse as Capt. Macbee
- Bruno Punzalan as Goro
- Andres Centanera as Arcadio
- Ely Ramos Jr.

== Production ==
The Brides of Blood Island was produced by Romero, Lynn, and Irwin Pizor. It was shot in Premier Productions Studio in Manila and on location. with a budget of $75,000. Intended for an American audience, the plot and dialogue made no references to the Philippines.

The shoot was originally to run four weeks, but because the money kept running out, it ended up taking 11 weeks to complete. Ashley did not mind, however, since he got along well with Romero and the crew. If he was not paid, he would just stop working until his check came through. Ashley said he was keen to accept the offer to make the movie because his marriage to Deborah Walley had just broken up and he wanted to get out of the United States.

The film was known during filming as Orgy of Blood.

Continuity between day and night is ignored throughout the last third of the film with shots cutting from dark skies to bright blue skies and back again.

== Release ==
The film was first released in the Philippines as The Brides of Blood Island by Udia Film Exchange in mid-1966, and was later released as Brides of Blood in the United States in 1968 on a double bill with Blood Fiend, a British film originally titled Theatre of Death. It was re-released in some areas as Brides of the Beast and Grave Desires.

The pressbook for Brides stated that all female theater patrons would be given the opportunity to "become a Bride of Blood and receive a free engagement ring set!". Each customer received a set of two cheap plastic rings. Sam Sherman came up with the wedding ring gimmick and tried to persuade Romero to add a phony printed marriage license to the package, but Lynn vetoed the idea, noting that the phony licenses could lead Hemisphere into unwanted legal situations involving minors, such as unwanted pregnancies.

=== Home media ===
Image Entertainment released Brides of Blood on DVD in 2002, featuring a restored, remastered original version of the film, as well as audio commentary by Sherman and an interview with Romero.

== Reception ==
The movie was well received, doing particularly well in American drive-in theaters. Ashley later said "the film did some business; they had some kind of gimmick with plastic wedding rings and things like that". Its success led to two more "Blood Island" films, The Mad Doctor of Blood Island and Beast of Blood. Ashley actually moved to the Philippines in 1968, where he lived for the next few years, co-producing several horror films there in partnership with Romero and Roger Corman.

The Los Angeles Times called it "stupid and shoddy in every aspect, but so ludicrous it's sometimes fun", and said that Hills "emerges vital and sexy".

Diabolique magazine said Ashley was "solid and professional rather than outstanding, but he brings a believability that is vital in a movie with such an outlandish plot."

Hills later said that she had signed to shoot Queen of the Jungle in the Philippines with Ed Wood Jr. in July 1966, but the film was never made.
