= Dr. Ciriaco Santiago Memorial Award =

Filipino film awards

The Filipino Academy of Movie Arts and Sciences, on behalf of the Santiago family, bestowed the Dr. Ciriaco Santiago Memorial Award to performers, producers, and directors of productions that have gained international recognition for their cinematic excellence.

The award was given in honor of Dr. Ciriaco Santiago, studio chief of Premiere Productions.

== Awardees ==
- 1959 Susan Roces
- 1962 Lamberto Avellana
- 1964 Eddie Romero.
- 1968 Emmanuel Rojas.
- 1971 Eddie Romero
- 1972 Atty. Espiridion Laxa
- 1973 Dr. Jose Perez
- 1974 Joseph Estrada
- 1976 Teodoro Valencia
- 1980 Jessie Ejercito
- 1982 Lily Monteverde
- 1987 Eddie Romero
- 1988 Bobby A. Suarez
- 1999 Monique Wilson
- 2000 Gary Valenciano
- 2001 Donita Rose
- 2002 Geneva Cruz
