= Savage Sisters =

1974 film by Eddie Romero

- Directed by: Eddie Romero
- Written by: H. Franco Moon; Harry Corner
- Produced by: John Ashley; Eddie Romero; David Cohen
- Starring: Gloria Hendry; John Ashley; Sid Haig; Eddie Garcia; Cheri Caffaro; Vic Díaz; Rosanna Ortiz; Rita Gomez; Leopoldo Salcedo
- Cinematography: Justo Paulino
- Edited by: Isagani Pastor
- Music by: Bax
- Production companies: Cinema Projects International; American International Pictures (AIP); Hemisphere Pictures
- Distributed by: American International Pictures (AIP) (US)
- Release date: July 1974
- Running time: 86 minutes
- Countries: Philippines; United States
- Language: English
- Budget: US$250,000.00 (estimated)

Savage Sisters is a 1974 women in prison film made in the Philippines and directed by Eddie Romero.

It was the last and most expensive of several movies actor/producer John Ashley filmed in that country.

== Plot ==
In a revolution-torn country, 1 million US dollars is stolen by a group of revolutionaries, including Mai Ling and Jo Turner. The revolutionaries are betrayed by gang members Malavasi and One Eye, who helped them with the job, and are imprisoned.

Policewoman Lynn Jackson busts Mai Ling and Jo out of prison. Captain Morales goes after them. The women deal with a con man, W.P. Billingsley.

Everyone chases after the money. Malavasi and One Eye try to get it, but are buried up to their necks in the sand. Billingsley tries to take the money, but is overpowered by the women.

== Cast ==
- Gloria Hendry as Lynn Jackson
- Cheri Caffaro as Jo Turner
- Rosanna Oritz as Mei Ling
- John Ashley as W. P. Billingsley
- Sid Haig as Malavasi
- Eddie Garcia as Captain Morales
- Vic Díaz as "One-Eye"
- Rita Gomez as Matron Ortega
- Leopoldo Salcedo as General Balthazar
- Dindo Fernando as Ernesto
- Angelo Ventura as Punjab
- Romeo Rivera as Raul
- Alfonso Carvajal as Ruiz
- Robert Rivera as Rocco
- Subas Herrero as Victor

== Production ==
The film's estimated budget was $250,000.

The film's star, Gloria Hendry, later recalled, "John Ashley was a lot of fun, a very positive individual with a lot of energy. A free spirit. It was the first time I had ever gone to Manila, to the Philippines, to work... I spent three wonderful months there. I learned a lot about the country and their process of doing films."

The film was originally called Ebony, Ivory and Jade and strongly featured martial arts. However, by the time the film was released, several martial arts films had not performed well, so the advertising campaign focused instead on the movie being about a Patty Hearst-type liberation army.

== Reception ==
The Chicago Tribune said that "only the broadly comic performance of Sid Haig... breaks the monotony of it all."

The Los Angeles Times called it "one of the better lurid potboilers to come out of the Philippines... Romero's direction is snappy... amusing as a sort of very broad live action cartoon."

Diabolique magazine wrote that Ashley was "especially fun" in the film "as a mustachioed, cigar-smoking conman type figure, doing push ups in leopard print underwear and bedding the three leads, indicating Ashley might have enjoyed a decent career as a character actor in later years had he so chosen."

TV Guide described the film as follows: "a baffling picture about a group of rifle-wielding women who back a revolution on some faceless banana-republic island. Luckily, it doesn't take itself too seriously and emerges as just another of director Romero's exploitative island films."
