= Moro Witch Doctor =

- Theatrical release poster
- Directed by: Eddie Romero
- Screenplay by: Eddie Romero
- Produced by: Eddie Romero; Kane W. Lynn
- Starring: Jock Mahoney; Margia Dean; Vic Diaz; Reed Hadley; Paraluman; Michael Parsons
- Cinematography: Felipe Sacdalan
- Edited by: Joven Calub
- Music by: Ariston Avelino
- Production companies: Associated Producers International; Hemisphere Pictures
- Distributed by: 20th Century Fox
- Release date: November 1964
- Running time: 61 minutes
- Countries: United States; Philippines
- Languages: English; Filipino
- Budget: <US$65,000.00

Moro Witch Doctor (Filipino: Amok) is a 1964 action-adventure film, written and directed by Eddie Romero, and co-produced by Romero, Kane W. Lynn and Irwin Pizor (doing business as "Hemisphere Pictures"). The film stars Jock Mahoney, Margia Dean, Pancho Magalona, Reed Hadley, Paraluman, Vic Diaz and Michael Parsons. The film was shot back to back with The Walls of Hell.

The film originally ran 90 minutes. It was sold to Robert L. Lippert who arranged for it to be released in November 1964, by 20th Century Fox in a 61-minute version.

== Plot ==
CIA agent Jefferson Stark is ordered to the Philippines to investigate the double homicide of two American plantation owners, Cameron and Kruger. Authorities believe the two were killed as a result of local gun smuggling and drug dealing. Cameron's sister Paula helps Stark in his investigation, and learns her brother is still alive and has gone into hiding from the syndicate.

Stark discovers the plantation is all just a cover for the crime ring's smuggling operations. A fanatical cult leader named Datu Sumlang tries to buy the property, but when Paula refuses to sell, her brother's ex-friends start getting murdered. Stark uses Paula as a lure by telling her to meet him in Manila with a suitcase full of money. She gets attacked by the supposedly dead Kruger, and Stark comes to Paula's aid and kills him. With Kruger's death, the crime ring dissolves and her brother Cameron is exonerated.

== Cast ==
- Jock Mahoney as CIA Agent Jefferson Stark
- Margia Dean as Paula Cameron
- Pancho Magalona as Martin Gonzaga
- Reed Hadley as Robert Collins
- Paraluman as Selisa Noble
- Michael Parsons as Ackerman
- Dale Ishimoto as Manuel Romblon
- Vic Diaz as Salek
- Jay Ilagan as Mahmud
- Bruno Punzalan as Datu Sumlang
- Nemia Velasco as Mulan
- Jerry Uslander as Tom Cameron
- Paul Edwards Jr. as Arthur Kruger

== Production ==
Margia Dean later recalled "It was a dangerous film to do. That was really roughing it. We had machine-gunned guards all along ... Jock Mahoney was not very pleasant to work with ... He was a pompous ass."

== See also ==
- The Walls of Hell
