= Eddie Romero =

Filipino film director (1924–2013)

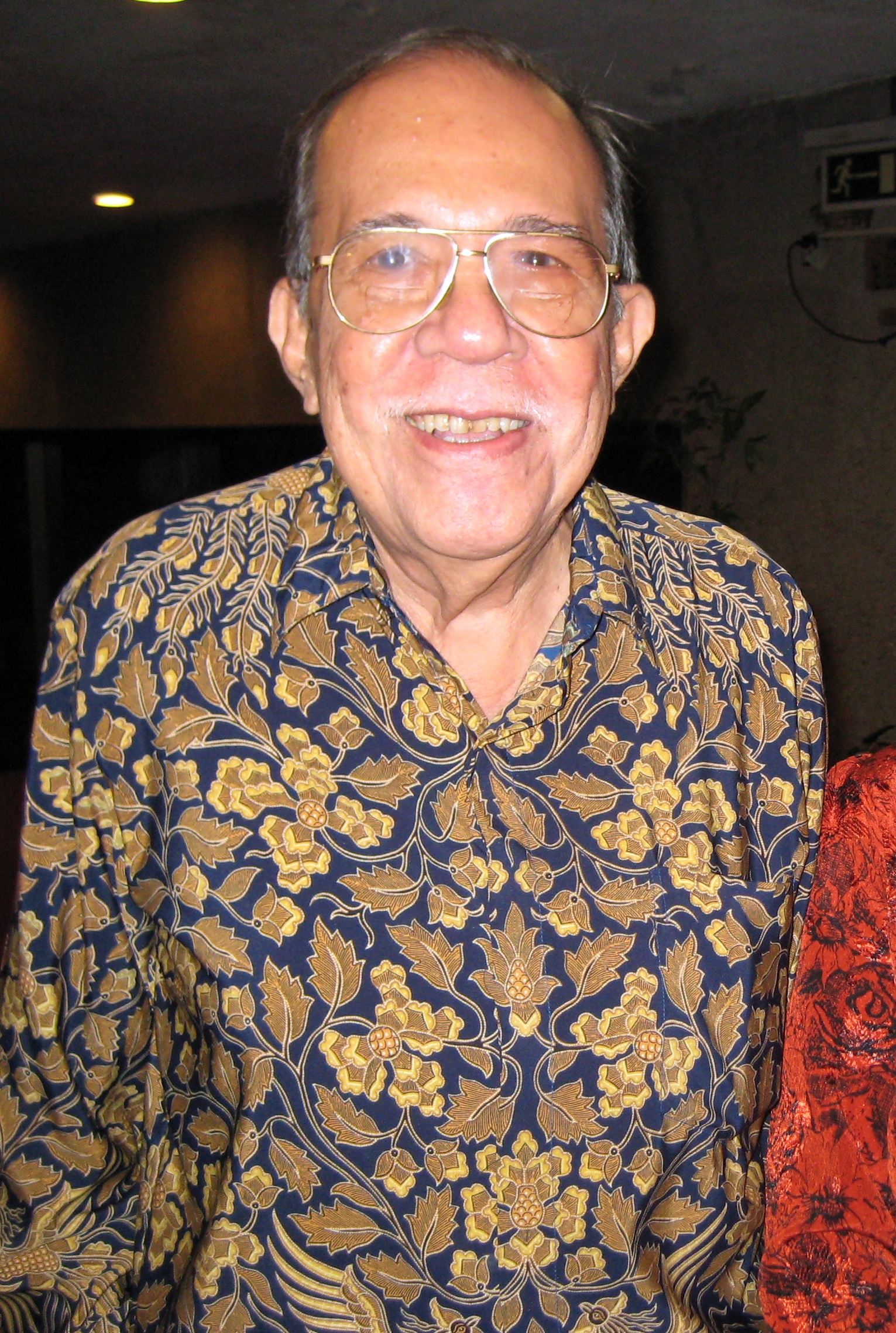
- Romero in 2007
- Born: Edgar Sinco Romero; July 7, 1924; Dumaguete, Negros Oriental, Philippine Islands
- Died: May 28, 2013 (aged 88); Manila, Philippines
- Education: Silliman University
- Occupations: Film director; producer; screenwriter
- Years active: 1947–2013
- Awards: Order of National Artists of the Philippines

Eddie Romero NA (born Edgar Sinco Romero; July 7, 1924 – May 28, 2013), was a Filipino film director, film producer and screenwriter.

== Early life ==
Romero was born on July 7, 1924. His father was José E. Romero, the first Philippine Ambassador to the Court of St James's. His mother was Pilar Guzman Sinco, a schoolteacher and the sister of University of the Philippines President Vicente G. Sinco who signed the United Nations Charter in 1945 on behalf of the Philippines. His brother was Jose V. Romero Jr., former Philippine Ambassador to Italy. He studied at Silliman University.

Romero's paternal grandparents were Francisco Romero Sr., mayor of Tanjay, Negros Oriental from 1909 to 1916 and later a member of the Provincial Board of Negros Oriental, and Josefa Calumpang Muñoz, daughter of Tanjay gobernadorcillo Don José Teves Muñoz and Doña Aleja Ines Calumpang, a great-granddaughter of Fernando Vélaz de Medrano y Bracamonte (es), Marquis of Tabuérniga de Velazar (es), 15th Marquis of Cañete (GE) (es), 6th Marquis of Fuente el Sol (es), 8th Marquis of Navamorcuende (es), 15th Lord of Montalbo, and Knight of the Order of St. John.

== Career ==
As a teenager, Romero wrote the screenplay to Gerardo de León's 1941 film Ang Maestra, and was briefly the editor-in-chief of the Negros Chronicle War News in the same year, with future screenwriter Cesar J. Amigo and future Dumaguete City mayor Jose Pro. Teves as part of his staff.

Romero was named National Artist of the Philippines in 2003, and his body of work delved into the history and politics of his country. His 1976 film Ganito Kami Noon…Paano Kayo Ngayon?, set at the turn of the 20th century during the revolution against the Spaniards and, later, the American colonizers, follows a naive peasant through his leap of faith to become a member of an imagined community. Aguila situated a family's story against the backdrop of Filipino history, while Kamakalawa explored the folklore of prehistoric Philippines. Banta ng Kahapon, his "small" political film, was set against the turmoil of the late 1960s, tracing the connection of the underworld to the corrupt halls of politics. His 13-part series Noli Me Tangere brought Philippine national hero José Rizal's novel to a new generation of viewers.

Romero co-produced the 1959 horror film Terror Is a Man, which was directed by his friend and fellow director Gerardo de Leon, with whom he would later co-direct other films. Romero directed some critically acclaimed war films in the early 1960s, such as Lost Battalion (1960), The Raiders of Leyte Gulf (1963) and The Walls of Hell (1964). Along with Filipino-language (Tagalog language) films, he made English-language films that became cult classics, like Black Mama, White Mama, Beast of the Yellow Night, The Woman Hunt, Beyond Atlantis and The Twilight People and worked with American actors like John Ashley and Pam Grier.

Romero's films, the National Artist citation stated, "are delivered in an utterly simple style – minimalist, but never empty, always calculated, precise and functional, but never predictable." Quentin Tarantino drew on Twilight People as an inspiration for his "grindhouse" homages.

Romero is especially known to horror film fans for his three "Blood Island" films from the late 1960s - Brides of Blood (1968), The Mad Doctor of Blood Island (1969) and Beast of Blood (1970), which he directed, co-produced by "Hemisphere Pictures" (which was composed of Romero, Kane W. Lynn and Irwin Pizor). Romero later called his American-financed "cult" films – including the "Blood Island" series – "the worst things I ever did". When the kung fu craze started in the 1970s, Romero turned his back on the international market for Filipino films which he had virtually created. After 1976, he made smaller, more personal "art" films in Filipino.

The Cultural Center of the Philippines 'Cine Icons' honored Romero with free film screening of Aguila on April 3, 1 p.m. at the GSIS Theater.

== Personal life ==
Romero was married to Carolina Gonzalez (1922-2019). She was a great-granddaughter of Don Francisco Gonzalez y Reinado, owner of the legendary 39,000-hectare Hacienda Esperanza that included the municipalities of Santa Maria, Santo Tomas, Rosales and San Quintin, extending through the rest of Pangasinan and the provinces of Tarlac and Nueva Ecija. She was the first cousin of Francis Gonzalez Moran, father of 1973 Miss Universe Margarita Moran-Floirendo. Romero was also, for a time, the partner of actress Mila del Sol.

He had three children --- Jose "Joey" Gonzalez Romero IV (film director and board member of the Movie and Television Review and Classification Board), Ancel Edgar Romero (President of HumanGood Affordable Housing in the San Francisco Bay Area), and Leo John Romero (a non-profit housing executive based in Sacramento, California).

== Death ==
Romero died on May 28, 2013, at age 88. He had been suffering from prostate cancer when he developed a blood clot in his brain.

== Filmography ==
- Ang Maestra (1941) (writer)
- Anong Ganda Mo (1941) (writer)
- So long America (1946) (writer)
- Isumpa mo giliw (1947) (writer)
- Mameng, iniibig kita (1947) (writer, assistant director)
- Si, si, señorito (1947) (writer)
- La Paloma (1947) (writer)
- Ang Kamay ng Diyos (1947) (director, writer)
- Kaaway ng bayan (1947) (writer)
- Hele hele bago quiere (1947) (writer)
- Hindi kita malimot (1948) (director)
- Selosa (1948) (director, writer)
- Apoy sa langit (1949) (director)
- Abogada (1949) (director)
- Always kay ganda mo (1949) (director)
- Sa piling mo (1949) (director)
- Sipag ay yaman (1949) (writer)
- Milagro ng birhen ng mga rosas (1949) (writer)
- Camelia (1949) (writer)
- Batalyon trece (1949) (writer)
- Kasintahan sa pangarap (1951) (director)
- Sabas, ang barbaro/ Sabas the Barbarian (1952) (director) based on a comic book character
- Buhay alamang (1952) (director, writer)
- Ang asawa kong Amerikana (1953) (director)
- Ang ating pag-ibig (1953) (director)
- El Indio (1953) (director)
- Maldita (1953) (director)
- May bakas ang lumipas (1954) (director)
- Cavalry Command (aka The Day of the Trumpet) (1958) (director, writer)
- The Kidnappers (1958) (director)
- The Scavengers (1959) (co-producer, writer)
- Terror Is a Man (1959) (co-producer)
- Espionage: Far East (1961) (director)
- Lost Battalion (1960) (producer, director, writer)
- Pitong gabi sa Paris/ Seven Nights in Paris (1960) (director)
- The Raiders of Leyte Gulf (1963) (producer, director)
- The Walls of Hell (1964) a.k.a. Intramuros (producer, director)
- Moro Witch Doctor (1964) aka Amuck (producer, director, writer)
- Flight to Fury (1964) (producer, director of alternate Tagalog version only, titled Cordillera)
- The Ravagers (1965) a.k.a. Hanggang may kalaban (producer, director, writer)
- The Passionate Strangers (1968)(director, writer)
- Manila, Open City (1968) (producer, director, writer)
- Brides of Blood (1968) (producer, director)
- The Mad Doctor of Blood Island (1969) (producer, director)
- Beast of Blood (1970) a.k.a. Beast of the Dead (US: TV title), a.k.a. Blood Devils (UK)(producer, director, writer)
- Beast of the Yellow Night (1971) (producer, director, writer)
- Black Mama, White Mama (1972) (producer, director)
- The Twilight People (1972) a.k.a. Beasts, a.k.a. Island of the Twilight People (producer, director, writer)
- The Woman Hunt (1973) (producer, director)
- Beyond Atlantis (1973) (producer, director)
- Savage Sisters (1974) (producer, director)
- Ganito Kami Noon... Paano Kayo Ngayon? (1976) (director, screenplay)
- Sudden Death (1977) (director)
- Sinong kapiling? Sinong kasiping? (1977) (director, writer)
- Banta ng kahapon (1977) (director, writer)
- Durugin si Totoy Bato (1979) (screenplay)
- Aguila (1980) (director, screenplay, producer)
- Palaban (1980) (director)
- Kamakalawa (1981) (director, writer)
- Desire (1982) (director)
- Ang Padrino (1984) (screenplay)
- Hari sa hari, lahi sa lahi (1987) a.k.a. King and Emperor (International: English title) (director, writer)
- A Case of Honor (1988) (director)
- Whiteforce (1988) (director)
- Noli Me Tangere (1993) (director)
- Faces of Love (2007) (director)
- Teach Me to Love (2008) (director)

== Awards and nominations ==
In 2003, Romero was awarded the National Artist Award by the Philippine government for his contribution to Philippine cinema and broadcast arts. Earlier in 1991, he was awarded the Gawad CCP para sa Sining. In 2004, he was also awarded the Cinemanila Lifetime Achievement Award.

In 2024, Senator Grace Poe authored Senate Resolution No.1040, honoring Romero in his July 7 centennial. The National Commission for Culture and the Arts and Dumaguete LGU, in a 3-day centennial, featured lectures by Nick Deocampo and film screening of restored movies at Silliman University's Claire Isabel McGill Luce Auditorium. His bust by sculptor Frederic Caedo, was unveiled by Mayor Felipe Antonio B. Remollo, Joey Romero and NCCA Deputy Director Marichu Tellano.

| Year | Award-giving body | Category | Work | Result |
|---|---|---|---|---|
| 1951 | Maria Clara Awards | Best Director | Ang Prinsesa at ang Pulubi | Won |
| 1952 | Maria Clara Awards | Best Screenplay | Diego Silang | Won |
| 1953 | FAMAS Awards | Best Screenplay (with Cesar Amigo) | Buhay Alamang | Won |
| 1964 | FAMAS Awards | Dr. Ciriaco Santiago Memorial Award | Cavalry Command | Won |
| 1967 | FAMAS Awards | Best Director | The Passionate Strangers | Won |
| 1967 | FAMAS Awards | Best Screenplay | The Passionate Strangers | Won |
| 1968 | Manila Film Festival | Best Director | Manila, Open City | Won |
| 1971 | FAMAS Awards | Dr. Ciriaco Santiago Memorial Award | | Won |
| 1976 | Metro Manila Film Festival | Best Film | Ganito Kami Noon, Paano Kayo Ngayon | Won |
| 1976 | Metro Manila Film Festival | Best Director | Ganito Kami Noon, Paano Kayo Ngayon | Won |
| 1976 | Metro Manila Film Festival | Best Screenplay (with Roy Iglesias) | Ganito Kami Noon, Paano Kayo Ngayon | Won |
| 1977 | FAMAS Awards | Best Picture | Ganito Kami Noon, Paano Kayo Ngayon | Nominated |
| 1977 | FAMAS Awards | Best Director | Ganito Kami Noon, Paano Kayo Ngayon | Nominated |
| 1977 | Gawad Urian Awards | Best Film (Pinakamahusay na Pelikula) | Ganito Kami Noon, Paano Kayo Ngayon | Won |
| 1977 | Gawad Urian Awards | Best Direction (Pinakamahusay na Direksyon) | Ganito Kami Noon, Paano Kayo Ngayon | Won |
| 1977 | Gawad Urian Awards | Best Screenplay (Pinakamahusay na Dulang Pampelikula) (with Roy Iglesias) | Ganito Kami Noon, Paano Kayo Ngayon | Won |
| 1978 | Gawad Urian Awards | Best Direction (Pinakamahusay na Direksyon) | Banta ng Kahapon | Nominated |
| 1978 | Gawad Urian Awards | Best Film (Pinakamahusay na Pelikula) | Banta ng Kahapon | Nominated |
| 1978 | Gawad Urian Awards | Best Screenplay (Pinakamahusay na Dulang Pampelikula) | Sinong kapiling? Sinong kasiping? | Nominated |
| 1980 | FAMAS Awards | Best Screenplay (with Fred Navarro) | Durugin si Totoy Bato | Won |
| 1981 | FAMAS Awards | Best Picture (with Bancom Audiovision) | Aguila | Won |
| 1981 | FAMAS Awards | Best Director | Aguila | Won |
| 1981 | FAMAS Awards | Best Screenplay | Aguila | Won |
| 1981 | Gawad Urian Awards | Best Film of the Decade (Natatanging Pelikula ng Dekada) | Aguila | Won |
| 1981 | Gawad Urian Awards | Best Film (Pinakamahusay na Pelikula) | Aguila | Nominated |
| 1981 | Gawad Urian Awards | Best Direction (Pinakamahusay na Direksyon) | Aguila | Nominated |
| 1981 | Gawad Urian Awards | Best Screenplay (Pinakamahusay na Dulang Pampelikula) | Aguila | Nominated |
| 1985 | FAMAS Awards | Best Screenplay (with Ronwaldo Reyes and Fred Navarro) | Ang Padrino | Won |
| 1986 | FAMAS Awards | FAMAS Awards Hall of Fame for screenplay | | Won |
| 1987 | FAMAS Awards | Dr. Ciriaco Santiago Memorial Award | | Won |
| 1993 | FAMAS Awards | FAMAS Lifetime Achievement Award | | Won |
| 1995 | Gawad Urian Awards | Gawad Urian Lifetime Achievement Award (Natatanging Gawad Urian) | | Won |
| 1996 | FAMAS Awards | Best Screenplay | Kahit Butas ng Karayom Papasukin Ko | Won |
| 2000 | FAMAS Awards | FAMAS Presidential Award | | Won |
| 2000 | FAP Awards | FAP Lifetime Achievement Award | | Won |
| 2008 | FAMAS Awards | Best Story | Faces of Love | Nominated |
| 2008 | Luna Awards | Best Picture | Faces of Love | Nominated |
| 2008 | Luna Awards | Best Direction | Faces of Love | Nominated |
| 2008 | Luna Awards | Best Screenplay (with Rica Arevalo) | Faces of Love | Nominated |

== See also ==
- Cinema of the Philippines
- Filipino Academy of Movie Arts and Sciences Award
- List of Silliman University people
- List of University of the Philippines people
- National Artists of the Philippines
