= Sinong Kapiling? Sinong Kasiping? =

- Directed by: Eddie Romero
- Written by: Eddie Romero
- Produced by: Ruby Tiong Tan
- Starring: Gloria Diaz
- Cinematography: Justo Paulino
- Edited by: Ben Barcelon
- Music by: Lutgardo Labad
- Production companies: Hemisphere Pictures; Mariposa Production
- Release date: July 14, 1977
- Country: Philippines
- Language: Filipino

Sinong Kapiling? Sinong Kasiping? is a 1977 Philippine romantic musical drama directed by Eddie Romero.

The film received two Gawad Urian Awards in 1978, as Daria Ramirez and Lito Legaspi won the Best Actress and Best Supporting Actor award.

== Cast ==
- Gloria Diaz
- Rosemarie Gil
- Lito Legaspi
- Daria Ramirez
- Mat Ranillo III
- Vic Vargas
- Tita Duran
- Pancho Magalona
