= Diane Jergens =

American actress (1935–2018)

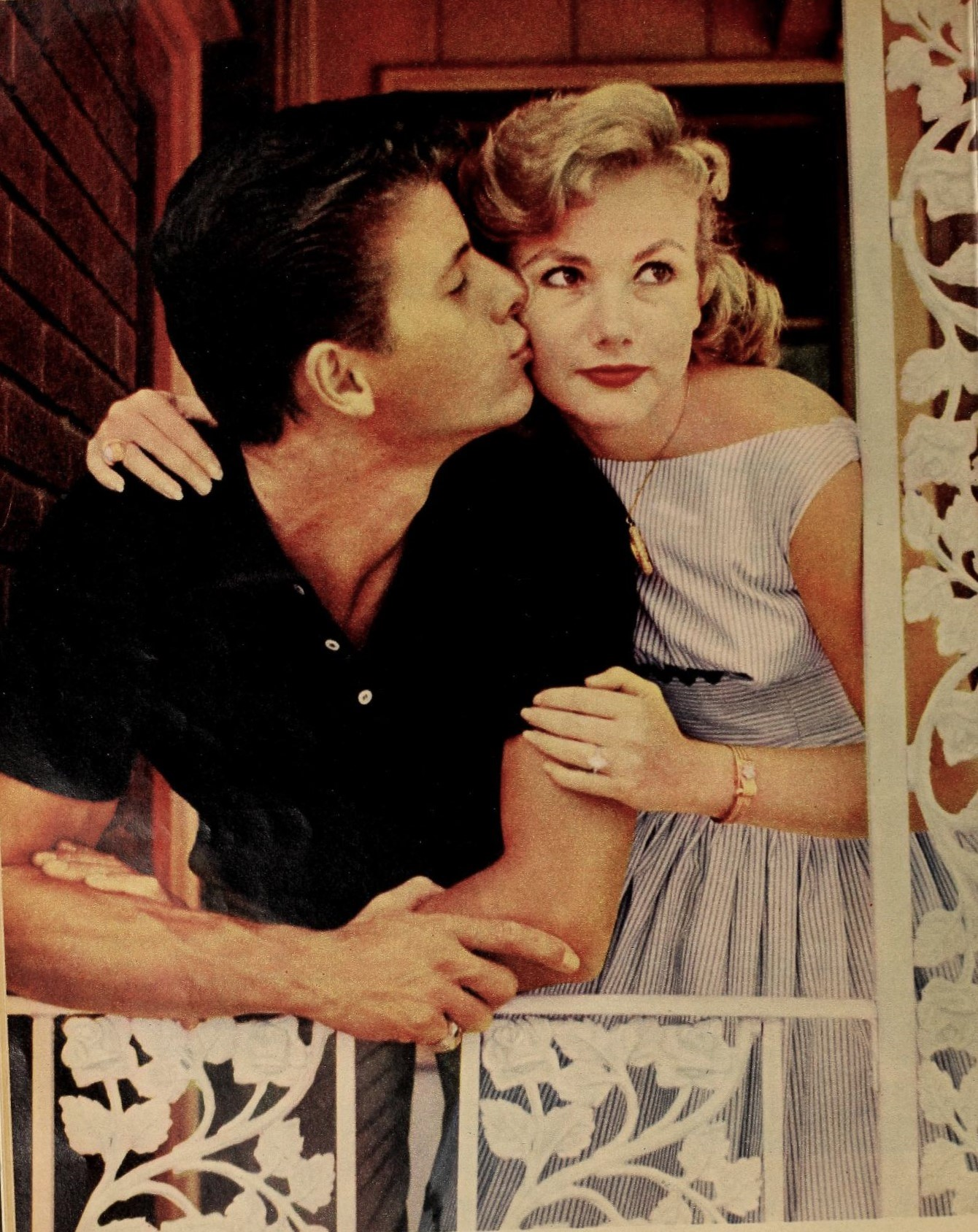
- Peter Brown and Jergens, 1959
- Born: Dianne Irgens; March 31, 1935; Minneapolis, Minnesota, U.S.
- Died: October 9, 2018 (aged 83); Valley Springs, California, U.S.
- Occupation: Actress
- Years active: 1946–1966
- Spouses: Peter Brown (m. 1958; div. 1960) Randy Sparks (m. 1962)
- Children: 4

Diane Jergens (born Dianne Irgens; March 31, 1935 – October 9, 2018) was an American film and television actress.

== Early years ==
Jergens was the daughter of Norman C. Irgens, an alderman in Minneapolis, and his wife. In 1944, at age 8, she auditioned for two film studios in Hollywood and was asked to return to make a film. In 1950, the family moved to Hollywood. When Jergens was 16, she was a member of the Heidt Steppers dancing troupe, which was part of the Horace Heidt Show. Soon after Jergens graduated from Hollywood High School, she performed as a singer on tour with composer Jimmy McHugh.

== Career ==
She made her screen debut in the 1946 film Ginger. She was featured in such 1950s films as The FBI Story with James Stewart and Desk Set starring Spencer Tracy and Katharine Hepburn. Her other films included leading roles in High School Confidential and Island of Lost Women.

She made two films in the Philippines, Lost Battalion (1960) and Espionage:Far East (1961).

On television, she portrayed Francine Williams on The Bob Cummings Show in the 1955–1956 season, and she had a recurring role on The George Burns and Gracie Allen Show. She also appeared on other TV shows such as Dragnet, The Danny Thomas Show, The Addams Family, The Adventures of Ozzie and Harriet, 77 Sunset Strip, and Tales of Wells Fargo

== Personal life and death ==
Jergens was married to actor Peter Brown between 1958 and 1960. In 1962, she wed musician and songwriter Randy Sparks. They had four children, Kevin Ray Sparks, Melinda Anne Sparks and Cameron Michael Sparks (twins), and Amanda Hamilton Sparks. She died on October 9, 2018, aged 83, in Valley Springs, California.

== Filmography ==
Year	Title	Role	Notes
1946	Ginger	Diane	
1947	Beat the Band	Minor role	Uncredited
1954	The Bob Mathias Story	Pat Mathias	
1955	Daddy Long Legs	College Girl	Uncredited
1956	The Benny Goodman Story	Velma – Benny's Giggly Date	Uncredited
1956	The Unguarded Moment	Girl in Hall	Uncredited
1956	Friendly Persuasion	Elizabeth – Quaker girl	Uncredited
1956	Teenage Rebel	Jane Hewitt	
1956	Three Brave Men	Shirley Goldsmith	
1957	Desk Set	Alice	
1958	Sing, Boy, Sing	Pat Barry	
1958	High School Confidential	Joan Staples	
1959	Island of Lost Women	Urana	
1959	The FBI Story	Jennie Hardesty	
1960	Escape to Paradise	Catherine Hughes	
1961	Teenage Millionaire	Barbara 'Bambi' Price	
1961	Espionage: Far East		
