= Terror Is a Man =

1959 Filipino/American horror film directed by Gerardo de León

- Theatrical release poster
- Directed by: Gerardo de Leon
- Screenplay by: (Harry) Paul Harber
- Based on: The Island of Doctor Moreau by H.G. Wells (uncredited)
- Produced by: Kane W. Lynn; Eddie Romero
- Starring: Francis Lederer; Greta Thyssen; Richard Derr; Oscar Keesee; Flory Carlos
- Cinematography: Emmanuel I. Rojas
- Edited by: Gervasio Santos
- Music by: Ariston Avelino
- Production companies: Lynn-Romero Productions; Premiere Productions
- Distributed by: Valiant Films (United States); E.J. Fancey (United Kingdom); Astral Films (Canada); Hemisphere Pictures (re-release)
- Release date: December 12, 1959
- Running time: 89 minutes
- Countries: Philippines; United States
- Language: English

Terror Is a Man (also known as Blood Creature, Creature from Blood Island, Island of Terror and Gore Creature) is a 1959 black-and-white horror film directed by Gerardo de Leon. The film's art director was Vicente Bonus, with special effects by Hilario Santos and makeup by Remedios Amazon.

The film is the first in the Blood Island series produced by Eddie Romero and Kane W. Lynn, which also included Brides of Blood (1966), The Mad Doctor of Blood Island (1969) and Beast of Blood (1970). All four films are set on Blood Island, named for its vivid red-hued sunsets.

The film's plot concerns a shipwreck survivor washed ashore on a small island where a scientist is experimenting on a panther to make it human.

== Plot ==
William Fitzgerald, the lone survivor of a shipwreck, washes ashore on Blood Island. He is found by Dr. Charles Girard, a scientist who has created a laboratory on the isolated island with his disenchanted wife Frances and his assistant Walter Perrera. The island's natives fear Dr. Girard, as he has been experimenting on a panther, surgically changing it with a series of painful operations into a half-man, half-panther beast that occasionally escapes from its cage and kills unwary villagers. The creature is swathed in bandages, but its cat-like eyes and ears are still evident. It is attracted to Frances, as she is the only person on the island who shows it pity.

As time passes on the island, Fitzgerald and Frances fall in love, and she asks him to take her away. The creature frees itself once again, but Walter sets it ablaze and recaptures it. The beast later escapes again and embarks on a rampage, killing Walter and a young servant girl named Selene and abducting Frances, carrying her into the jungle. With William and Charles in hot pursuit, the creature is cornered on the edge of a cliff, where it hurls the mad doctor to his death. Before the creature can attack the others, it is shot several times by William. Fleeing toward the beach, the wounded creature is helped by Selene's little brother Tiago, and the unconscious beast drifts to sea in a small rowboat.

== Cast ==
- Francis Lederer as Dr. Charles Girard
- Greta Thyssen as Frances Girard
- Richard Derr as William Fitzgerald
- Oscar Keesee as Walter Perrera
- Lilia Duran as Selene
- Peyton Keesee as Tiago - the boy
- Flory Carlos as the monster

== Production ==
Terror Is a Man is partially based on H.G. Wells' novel The Island of Doctor Moreau, although Wells is uncredited in the film.

== Release ==
=== Theatrical release ===
Terror Is a Man was theatrically released in the United States on December 12, 1959 on a double feature with another Eddie Romero film, The Scavengers. The film was rereleased under several alternate titles over the years, including Creature from Blood Island, Gore Creature, The Gory Creatures and Island of Terror. It was rereleased to theaters in 1969 by distributor Sam Sherman as Blood Creature. A warning-bell gimmick sounding like a telephone ringer warned the audience of impending gore during a surgical sequence.

=== Home media ===
The film was initially released on DVD on June 8, 1999 by Image Entertainment. It was next released as a double feature with Werewolf in a Girls' Dormitory by Madacy on March 20, 2001 as part of the Killer Creature Double Feature DVD series. Madacy rereleased the film as a part of its five-disc Killer Creature collection on October 5, 2004. Fox Lorber later released the film on September 9, 2003. It released by Alpha Video on September 25, 2012 and lastly in a Blu-ray box set of all of Romero's Blood Island films by Severin on November 13, 2018.

== Reception ==
Terror Is a Man received mixed to positive reviews upon its release, with some critics commending the atmosphere and cinematography while others criticized the "stilted" direction and outlandish premise.

The New York Times critic Howard Thompson gave the film a positive review, complimenting the cinematography and calling it "quiet, sensibly restrained and quite terrifying". Author and film critic Leonard Maltin awarded the film 2 out of 4 stars, writing that the film "came to life during the last third of the picture". VideoHound gave the film a similar score of 2 out of 4 bones. Hans J. Wollstein from Allmovie criticized the film's photography and stilted direction, calling it "hilariously silly". On his website Fantastic Movie Musings and Ramblings, Dave Sindelar said, "I've never quite known what to make of this off-beat variation on the Dr. Moreau story. In fact, off-beat doesn't seem like the right way to explain it; it's not what happens that is unusual, it's how it is handled. It almost seems like it isn't trying to be a horror movie; the characters are fleshed out quietly and subtly, and it refuses to make easy moral statements or decisions. I don't think it's quite successful, but I think it's trying for something out of the ordinary". Sindelar concluded his review by calling it "one of the better horror films to come out of the Philippines". In their book Science Fiction, Fantasy and Horror Film Sequels, Series and Remakes, authors Kim R. Holston and Tom Winchester awarded the film 3 out of 4 stars, calling it "atmospheric and spooky".

In his book Terror on Tape, James O'Neill wrote, "The first and best Filipino horror film, this grim variation on The Island of Doctor Moreau is better than you'd imagine. Dank photography and good acting beef up this talky flick, which finally bursts into action in the last half hour". Michael Weldon, author of The Psychotronic Encyclopedia of Film, said the film was "the original and best Filipino horror film". He also theorized that the unusual ending of the film was influenced by the ending of Mary Shelley's novel Frankenstein.

== Bibliography ==
- Hutchings, Peter (September 2, 2009). The A to Z of Horror Cinema. Scarecrow Press. ISBN 978-0-8108-7050-5.
