= The Moises Padilla Story =

1961 biographical film by Gerardo de Leon

- Official movie poster
- Directed by: Gerardo de León
- Screenplay by: Cesar J. Amigo
- Story by: Leon O. Ty
- Starring: Leopoldo Salcedo
- Cinematography: Fortunato Bernardo
- Edited by: Teofilo de Leon
- Music by: Tito Arevalo
- Production companies: MML Productions; Newsreel Philippines
- Release date: October 1961
- Country: Philippines
- Language: Filipino

The Moises Padilla Story is a 1961 Philippine biographical film directed by Gerardo de León and written by Cesar J. Amigo from a story by Leon O. Ty. Starring Leopoldo Salcedo, the story follows a Negros Occidental mayoral candidate who in 1951, was tortured and murdered by the private army of the provincial governor after he had refused to withdraw his candidacy. It also features Joseph Estrada, Lilia Dizon, Max Alvarado, Rosa Aguirre, and Robert Arevalo in both main and supporting roles.

Produced by MML Productions and Newsreel Philippines, the film was theatrically released in October 1961. It was selected as the Philippine entry for the Best Foreign Language Film at the 34th Academy Awards, but was not accepted as a nominee.

The film is still extant and was restored in 4K resolution by the Philippine Film Archive and Central Digital Lab in 2022. The restored version was premiered on September 2, 2022, in celebration of the Philippine Film Industry Month.

== Cast ==
- Leopoldo Salcedo as Moises Padilla
- Joseph Estrada as The Killer
- Lilia Dizon
- Ben Perez
- Oscar Roncal
- Max Alvarado
- Rosa Aguirre
- Robert Arevalo
- Mila Montañez
- Alfonso Carvajal
- Joseph de Cordova
