= Mario Montenegro =

Filipino actor and painter (1928–1988)

- Montenegro in Dagohoy (1953)
- Born: Roger Collin Macalalag; July 25, 1928; Pagsanjan, Laguna, Philippine Islands
- Died: August 27, 1988 (aged 60); Quezon City, Philippines
- Occupation: Actor
- Years active: 1949–1988
- Political party: Independent
- Spouse: Letty Alonzo (m. 1952)
- Relatives: Valeen Montenegro (granddaughter)

Mario Montenegro (born Roger Collin Macalalag; July 25, 1928 – August 27, 1988) was a Filipino actor and painter. He rose to stardom during the Golden Age of Philippine cinema as a heroic lead in historical and adventure films. He was dubbed "Brown Adonis" for his physique and portraying a number of culturally important Philippine figures, including Diego Silang, Andres Bonifacio, Macario Sakay, Ramon Magsaysay, Francisco Dagohoy, and Lapulapu.

== Early life ==
Montenegro was born in Pagsanjan, Laguna

Montenegro was a Fine Arts student at the University of the Philippines upon the invasion of the Philippines by Japan during World War II. At the age of fourteen, he joined the armed resistance against the Imperial Japanese Army as a member of the Hunters ROTC guerilla unit. He was only sixteen when he, along with the Hunters ROTC, participated in the famed raid on the Japanese internment camp at Los Baños, Laguna on February 23, 1945. He received multiple medals for distinction before he rejoined civilian life in 1946.

== Film career ==
In 1949, Montenegro was cast in his first film role in the World War II drama Capas. The following year, he was cast by director Manuel Conde in his first leading role, in Apat na Alas (1950).

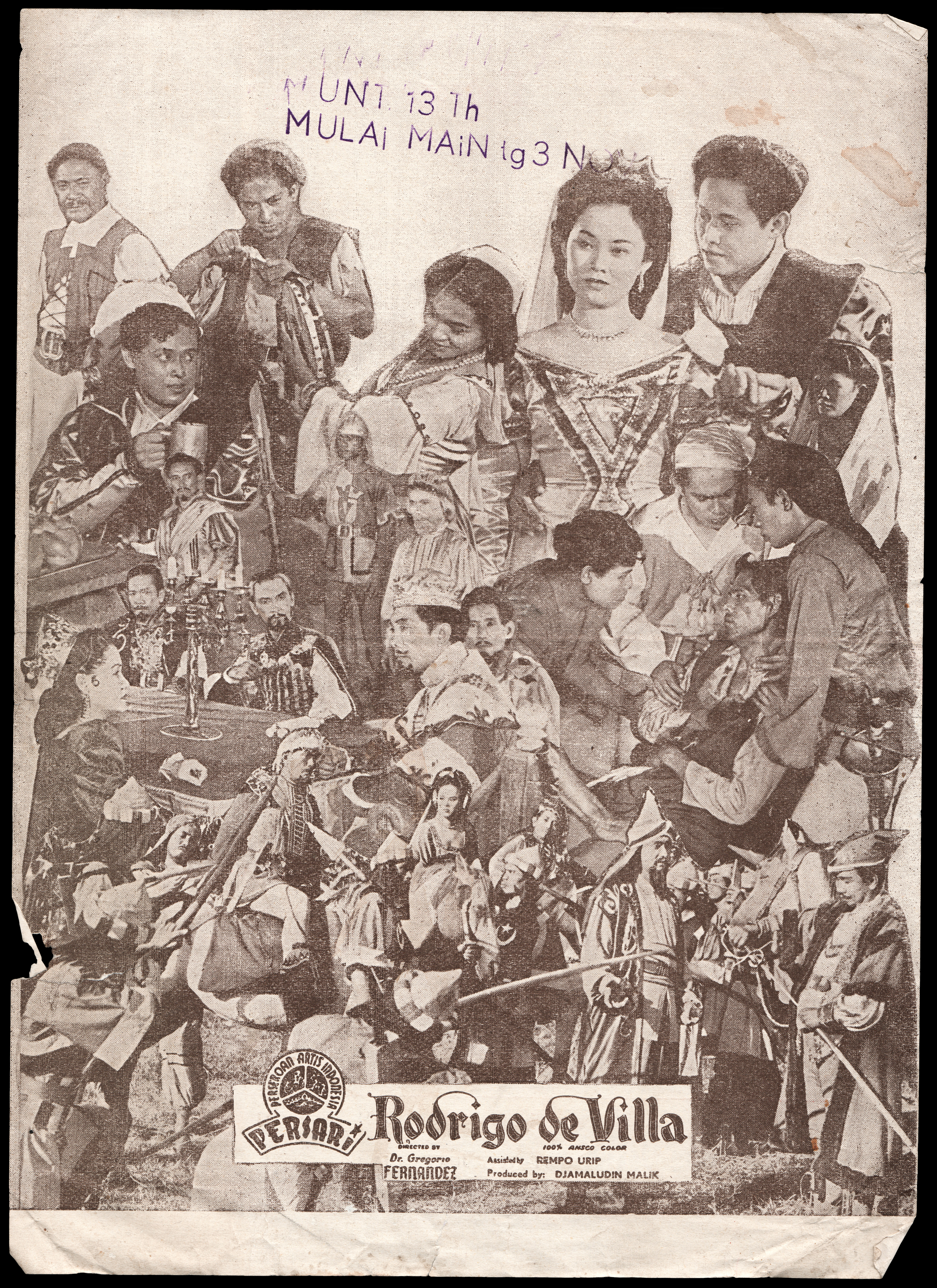
Theatrical poster of Rodrigo de Villa, Montenegro portrays the titular role.

During the 1950s, Montenegro was among the mainstays of LVN Pictures studio headed by Doña Sisang de León. He was often cast in costume dramas and action films, dabbling occasionally in comedy roles. He portrayed heroic leads in such historical films as Dagohoy (1953), Lapulapu (1955), Kilabot ng Makiling (1959) and Alyas Sakay (1959). Throughout his career, Montenegro would be nominated for a total of three FAMAS acting awards, including two Best Actor nominations.

As he aged, Montenegro found himself cast in character roles. Among his more notable later roles was in Mike de Leon's Itim (1976), for which he received a Best Supporting Actor nomination from the Gawad Urian.

His last film was Madonna: Ang Babaeng Ahas, filmed in 1988, but it was released posthumously in 1991.

== Political views ==
Montenegro campaigned for Corazon Aquino and Salvador Laurel during the 1986 snap presidential election.

== Death ==
Montenegro died of a heart attack on August 20, 1988, in Manila, Philippines.

== Legacy ==
His surviving granddaughter Valeen Montenegro is also an actress following the footsteps of his legacy.

== Filmography ==
Year	Title	Role	Notes
1949	Capas		
1950	Apat Na Alas		
1952	Correccional	Armando	
1952	Bathaluman		
1952	Rodrigo de Villa		
1953	3 Labuyo		
1953	Sa Kuwintas ng Pasakit		
1953	Makabuhay		Based on the novel by M. S. Martin and S. G. Bautista (serialized in Liwayway)
1953	Luha at Musika		
1953	Dagohoy	Francisco Dagohoy	
1954	Pasiya ng Langit		
1954	Dambanang Putik		
1955	Lapu-Lapu	Lapu-Lapu	
1955	Pilipino Kostum: No Touch!		
1956	Ilaw sa Karimlan		
1956	Ulilang Bituin		
1956	Everlasting		
1956	Medalyong Perlas		Segment: "Sa Pusod ng Dagat"
1956	Among Tunay		
1956	Higit sa Korong		
1957	Walang Sugat		Based on the zarzuela of the same name by Severino Reyes
1957	Topo-Topo		
1957	Pintor Kulapol		
1957	Nasaan Ka Irog		
1958	Balae		
1958	Rebelde	Mario	
1958	Ay, Pepita		
1958	Casa Grande		Segment: "Herederos"
1958	Venganza		
1959	Cover Girl		
1959	Amazona	Teddy	
1959	Kilabot sa Makiling	Oscar/Kilabot	Based on a novel (serialized in Liwayway)
1960	Ang Inyong Lingkod, Gloria Romero		Segment: "Ang Buhay ng Tao'y Gulong ang Kabagay...."
1960	Limang Misteryo ng Krus		Segment: "Koronang Tinik"
1960	Pagpatak ng Ulan		
1960	Ginang Hukom		Segment: "Case No. 3: 'Paglipas ng Dilim'"
1960	Gumuhong Bantayog		
1960	7 Amores		Segment: "Igorot Story"
1961	Angelica		
1961	5 Yugto ng Buhay		Segment: "Balatkayo"
1961	Dalawang Kalbaryo ni Dr. Mendez		
1961	Alyas Sakay		
1961	Ito Ba ang Aking Ina?	Waldo	
1961	Karugtong ng Kahapon		
1962	Walang Susuko	Capt. Bert Gabriel	
1962	Labanan sa Balicuatro		
1962	Apat Na Kilabot		"Unang Handog" (initial offering) of LEA Productions
1962	Thor	Thor	Based on the comic of the same name (serialized in Liwayway)
1962	Jose Bandido	Jose	
1963	Mga Batong Hiyas		
1963	Anak, ang Iyong Ina!		
1963	Haliging Bato		
1963	Ang Asawa Kong Barat		
1963	Ang Manananggol ni Ruben		
1964	Duwag ang Sumuko		Based on the novel by Francisco V. Coching (serialized in Liwayway)
1964	Lalaine Mahal Kita		
1965	Operation Manila		
1966	Itinakwil Man Kita		
1966	Totoy Bingi		
1966	The Passionate Strangers		
1966	Ito ang Dahilan!		
1966	Ito ang Pilipino	Rene	
1968	Manila, Open City		
1968	Mindanao		
1968	Liku-likong Landas		
1972	Poor Little Rich Girl		
1976	Itim	Dr. Torres	
1977	Mga Bilanggong Birhen		
1979	Isa para sa Lahat, Lahat para sa Isa		
1980	4 Na Maria		
1987	Pasan Ko ang Daigdig	Ignacio Aboitiz, Jr.	
1991	Madonna: Ang Babaeng Ahas		Released posthumously
