= Monang Carvajal =

Filipina actress (1898–1980)

- Born: Patrocinio Tagaroma Carvajal; 30 June 1898; Manila, Captaincy General of the Philippines
- Died: 22 June 1980 (aged 81); San Juan, Metro Manila, Philippines
- Other names: Patrocinio Carvajal, Patring Carvajal
- Occupation: Filipino actress
- Years active: 1920–1977

Monang Carvajal (born Patrocinio Tagaroma Carvajal; 30 June 1898 – 22 June 1980) was a Filipina film actress best known for her roles in thriller and horror movies. She was dubbed the "Queen of Horror Pictures."

== Biography ==
Carvajal was born in Manila on June 30, 1898, the daughter of Spanish Zarzuela actors Don Jose Carvajal and Patrocinio Tagaroma de Carvajal. By the age of 4, she was appearing on stage, appearing alongside her parents. In her teens, she was touring the bodabil circuit together with Manuel Silos as a comedy duo known as "Monang & Sano." Silos would later become a prominent film director.

Carvajal made her film debut in 1920, in the silent film El Trust de los Tenorios. Soon, she found herself frequently cast in horror films, often as a monster, a witch (mangkukulam) or some other supernatural being. Along her roles in this vein were in such films as Sumpa ng Aswang (1935), Gamu-Gamong Naging Lawin (1937), Halimaw (1941), and Malaya, Mutya ng Gubat (1948).

Carvajal was also adept as a film comedian, appearing in comic roles in Ay Monang (1939), Victory Joe (1946), and Principe Amante (1950). In 1962, she would be nominated for a FAMAS Best Supporting Actress award for her role in El Filibusterismo, Gerardo de Leon's film version of Jose Rizal's second novel. Thirty-two years earlier, Carvajal had appeared in a silent film version of Rizal's first novel, Noli Me Tangere.

Carvajal maintained an active film career until nearly the end of her life, appearing in Mga Bilangong Birhen (1977). She died from cancer at Cardinal Santos Medical Center in June 1980.

== Family ==
Her brothers, Jose Carvajal and Alfonso Carvajal, as well as her daughter Perla, her granddaughter, Baby Delfino, and great-granddaughter, Alma Concepcion, all had careers as actors in the Philippines' film industry.

Monang Carvajal's son Ernesto and grandson Maurice were film make-up artists who specialized in prosthetics.

Monang Carvajal's nephew, Carlos K Carvajal, is an internationally known choreographer and director. He is the present co-artistic director of the San Francisco Ethnic Dance Festival 2015.

Monang Carvajal's grand niece, Celina Carvajal [aka Lena Hall] won the 2014 Tony Award for best actress in a Broadway musical for her role as Istzak in "Hedwig and the Angry Inch."

== Filmography ==
=== Silent movies ===
- 1930: Noli me Tangere
- 1932: Sa Labi ng Lumang Libingan
- 1933: Ang Aswang

=== Sound movies ===
- 1933: Doctor Kuba
- 1934: X3X
- 1935: Sumpa ng Aswang
- 1935: Himala ni Bathala
- 1937: Gamu-gamong Naging Lawin
- 1939: Ay! monang
- 1940: Hali
- 1941: Panibugho
- 1941: Binibini ng Palengke
- 1941: Halimaw
- 1941: Serenata sa Nayon
- 1941: Palaris
- 1941: Mariposa
- 1941: Manilena
- 1946: Principeng hindi tumatawa
- 1946: Ligaya
- 1946: Victory Joe
- 1947: Nabasag ang banga
- 1947: Ikaw ang mahal ko
- 1947: Si Juan Tamad
- 1947: Oh, Salapi!
- 1947: Maling Akala
- 1948: Malaya (aka Mutya sa Gubat)
- 1949: Gitano
- 1950: Doctor X
- 1954: Dalaginding
- 1954: Mabangong Kandungan
- 1954: Dambanang Putik
- 1955: Lapu-Lapu
- 1955: Indian Pana
- 1955: Talusaling - Inang
- 1955: Tagapagmana
- 1956: Anak Dalia
- 1960: Katotohanan o guniguni? - Fourth Story
- 1960: Si Marita at ang Pitong Duwende
- 1961: Prinsipe Diomedes at ang mahiwagang gitara
- 1961: The Moises Padilla Story
- 1962: El filibusterismo
- 1962: Puro labis puro kulang
- 1962: Kababalaghan o kabulastugan? - Sepulturero (Second Story)
- 1965: Tagisan ng mga agimat
- 1977: Mga Bilanggong Birhen
- 1979: Angelita... Ako ang iyong ina - the Witch (final film role)

== Sources ==
- Lena Pareja (1994). "Philippine Film". In Nicanor Tiongson (ed.). CCP Encyclopedia of Philippine Art. Vol. VIII (1st ed.). Manila: Cultural Center of the Philippines. p. 217. ISBN 971-8546-31-6.
