= The Walls of Hell =

1964 Filipino film directed by Eddie Romero and Gerardo de Leon

- Directed by: Eddie Romero; Gerardo de Leon
- Written by: E.F. Romero
- Screenplay by: Ferde Grofe Jr.; Cesar Amigo; E.F. Romero
- Produced by: Eddie Romero; Kane W. Lynn; Irwin Pizor
- Starring: Jock Mahoney; Fernando Poe Jr.; Michael Parsons
- Cinematography: Felipe Sacdalan
- Edited by: Ben Barcelon
- Music by: Tito Arevalo
- Production companies: Hemisphere Pictures; Filipinas Pictures; Lynn-Romero Productions
- Distributed by: Hemisphere Pictures
- Release date: March 7, 1964
- Running time: 88 minutes
- Countries: Philippines; United States
- Languages: Filipino; English
- Budget: US$65,000.00

The Walls of Hell, also known as Intramuros, is a 1964 Philippine-American film directed by Eddie Romero and Gerardo de Leon and starring Jock Mahoney. The film was made back-to-back with Moro Witch Doctor (1964). It was produced by Hemisphere Pictures (owned by Eddie Romero, Irwin Pizor and Kane W. Lynn).

== Synopsis ==
In World War II during the Battle of Manila, fanatical Japanese soldiers fighting for their lives barricade themselves inside the walls of "Intramuros", the ancient Spanish walled city of Manila. The United States artillery is bombing them continuously, and the Japanese are holding thousands of innocent Filipino citizens hostage. An American reporter named Murray (Paul Edwards Jr.) arrives at the front where a guerrilla unit led by a Lt. Sorenson (Jock Mahoney) makes contact with a young Filipino guerilla named Nardo (Fernando Poe Jr.) who had escaped from Intramuros through a sewer tunnel. Nardo tells Sorenson that his wife is among the prisoners and that the sewer system can be used to rescue the hostages. As shells rain down on the walled city, the American forces invade the area. Sorenson is reunited with his wife, and the military forces its way into the burning city.

== Cast ==
- Jock Mahoney as Lt. Jim Sorenson
- Fernando Poe Jr. as Sgt. Nardo Maglaya
- Michael Parsons as Papa
- Oscar Roncal as Joker
- Paul Edwards Jr. as Murray
- Ely Ramos Jr. as Jose
- Fred Galang as Pedring
- Vance Skarstedt as Maj. Briggs
- Cecilia Lopez as Tina
- Arsenio Alonzo
- Claude Wilson as Major
- Pedro Navarro
- Carpi Asturias
- Andres Centenera
- Paquito Salcedo
- Alex Swanbeck
- Tommy Romulo
- Willie Salcedo
- Angel Buenaventura
- George Kramer
