= Kamakalawa =

1981 Filipino fantasy film

- Theatrical Film Poster
- Directed by: Eddie Romero
- Written by: Eddie Romero
- Produced by: Eddie Romero
- Starring: Christopher De Leon; Tetchie Agbayani; Chat Silayan
- Cinematography: Ricardo Remias
- Edited by: Ben Barcelon
- Music by: Ryan Cayabyab
- Production company: Hemisphere Pictures
- Distributed by: ATBP. Entertainment
- Release date: January 15, 1981
- Running time: 119 minutes
- Country: Philippines
- Language: Filipino

Kamakalawa (transl. The Day Before Yesterday) is a 1981 Filipino fantasy film written, produced and directed by Eddie Romero and starred Christopher De Leon, Tetchie Agbayani and Chat Silayan. The film explores the folklore of prehistoric Philippines.

The film is the last entry in Eddie Romero's epic historical film trilogy after "Ganito Kami Noon, Paano Kayo Ngayon?" and "Aguila", respectively.

== Cast ==
- Christopher De Leon as Kauing
- Tetchie Agbayani as Agos
- Chat Silayan as Amihan
- Raoul Aragonn as Dumagit
- Apeng Daldal as Olap
- Ruben Rustia as Kalai
- Jimmy Santos as Tuktok
- Yasmin Ayesa as Sibul
- Greg Lozano as Ulaya
- Johnny Vicar as Suhay
- Angelo Ventura as Pulo
- Joey Romero as Luok
- Gil Arceo as Ugau
- Boy Ybañez as Luok's Lieutenant
- Vic Santos as Luok's Lieutenant
- Arthur Cervantes as Luok's Lieutenant
- Nilda Magdamo as Kauing's Mother
- Lemuel Torrevillas as Kauing's Brother
- Rowena Tiempo Torrevillas as Kauing's Sister-in-Law
- Meg Doromal as Kauing's First Sister
- Fely Salve as Kauing's Second Sister
- Gil Bergado as Kauing's Father
- Marietta de la Cruz as Lead Amazon
- Ruby Mesina as Lead Amazon
- Noel Gallego as Lead Vampire
- Danny Bustamante as Lead Vampire
- George Hilario as Lead Elf
- Ricky Dumigpi as Lead Elf
- Eddie Sta. Maria as Lead Elf

== See also ==
- Aguila (film)
- Ganito Kami Noon, Paano Kayo Ngayon?
