= Lost Battalion (1960 film) =

- Film poster
- Directed by: Eddie Romero
- Written by: Cesar Amigo; Eddie Romero
- Produced by: Eddie Romero; Kane W. Lynn
- Starring: Leopoldo Salcedo; Diane Jergens
- Cinematography: Felipe Sacdalan
- Edited by: Joven Calub
- Music by: Les Baxter
- Production companies: Alta Vista Productions; Com Productions; LYNRO Pictures
- Distributed by: People's Pictures (1960) (Philippines); American International Pictures (1962) (USA)
- Release dates: 17 March 1960 (Philippines); 4 April 1960 (UK)
- Running time: 83 minutes
- Countries: Philippines; United States
- Languages: Filipino; English

Lost Battalion (a.k.a. Escape to Paradise) is a 1960 black-and-white romantic war film produced and directed by Eddie Romero, and co-produced by Romero and Kane W. Lynn. Set during World War II, it stars Leopoldo Salcedo, Johnny Monteiro and Diane Jergens. It was later released in the US by American International Pictures as Lost Battalion, on a double feature with Guns of the Black Witch in 1962. The film's ad line read "200 Men and One Girl Trapped in a Ring of Steel!"

== Plot ==
In the Philippines during World War II, an American major tries to move a guerrilla unit and group of American refugees to the coast, so they can be rescued by submarine, all the while trying to avoid capture by the occupying Japanese forces. Leopoldo Salcedo played the handsome Filipino guerrilla leader who is in love with a stranded American girl Kathy (Diane Jergens).

== Cast ==
- Leopoldo Salcedo as Ramon de Cortes
- Diane Jergens as Kathy Hughes
- Johnny Monteiro as Bruno
- Jennings Sturgeon as Mr. Hughes
- Joe Sison as Pepe
- Joe Dennis as Col. Landis
- Bruce Baxter as Jimmy
- Rosi Acosta as Pepe's Wife
- Joe Dennis as Landis

== Notes ==
The Philippines were overrun by the Japanese during WW2, and had to resort to guerilla fighting until General Douglas MacArthur made his famous return. The Philippines was liberated in 1945.

This movie also features the main character, Ramon, with Mr. Hughes and his daughter Katherine, both Americans, hiding in a cave and discovered by a primitive band of locals. These are presumed to be the Aeta people, thought to be the original people of the islands. The Aeta are smaller and darker than most Filipinos, and possess dark curly hair that made the Spanish, when they invaded in the 1500s, label them as "negritos".
