= Vic Diaz =

Filipino actor (1932–2006)

- Born: Victor Sunico Diaz; July 29, 1932; Manila, Philippine Islands
- Died: September 15, 2006 (aged 74); Manila, Philippines
- Occupation: Actor
- Years active: 1957–2001

Victor Sunico Diaz (July 29, 1932 – September 15, 2006), credited as Vic Diaz, was a Filipino character actor who mostly portrayed villains.

== Career ==
Diaz's first part in front of the camera was an uncredited role as a Japanese General in American Guerrilla in the Philippines (1950) directed by Fritz Lang.

He appeared in The Big Bird Cage, Black Mama White Mama and played Satan in Eddie Romero's Beast of the Yellow Night. He appeared in a number of other Filipino horror films in the 70s such as Blood Thirst, Beyond Atlantis, Daughters of Satan and Night of the Cobra Woman.

== Personal life and death ==
Diaz was married to Kit Diaz with whom he had three children, including the musician and songwriter Teddy Diaz.

On September 15, 2006 Diaz died in Manila at the age of 74. Diaz's remains were shared with his son Teddy Diaz at Santuario de San Antonio Parish in Makati City.

== Filmography ==
=== Film ===
Year	Title	Role	Notes	Ref.
1957	Bicol Express			
1958	Malvarosa			
1958	Eddie Junior Detective			
1958	Obra-Maestra			
1958	Ana María			
1958	Casa grande			
1958	Sisang Tabak			
1958	Cavalry Command	Julio	Also known as The Day of the Trumpet	
1959	The Scavengers	Casimiro O'Hara [uncredited]		
1961	Asiong Salonga			
1964	Kulay Dugo Ang Gabi...aka The Blood Drinkers			
1964	Flight to Fury	Lorgren		
1964	From Hell to Borneo			
1964	Moro Witch Doctor	Salek		
1965	Operation C.I.A.	Professor Yen		
1965	Only the Brave Know Hell	Cruz	Released in the US as The Ravagers	
1966	The Passionate Strangers			
1968	Mission Batangas			
1968	Escape to Mindanao			
1969	Surabaya Conspiracy			
1969	Impasse	Jesus Jimenez Riley		
1970	The Losers	Diem-nuc	Released on video as Nam's Angels	
1971	Blood Thirst	Captain Miguel		
1971	Beast of the Yellow Night	Satan [uncredited]		
1972	Night of the Cobra Woman			
1972	Black Mama, White Mama	Vic Cheng [uncredited]		
1972	The Big Bird Cage	Rocco		
1972	Superbeast	Diaz		
1972	Daughters of Satan	Dr. Dangal		
1973	Fly Me	Enriquez		
1973	Wonder Women			
1973	Savage!	Minister [of Defense]		
1973	Beyond Atlantis	Manuel		
1973	A Taste of Hell	Major Kuramoto		
1974	The Deathhead Virgin			
1974	The Dragon Force Connection			
1974	Savage Sisters	One-Eye		
1974	Bamboo Gods and Iron Men			
1974	The Thirsty Dead			
1975	The Pacific Connection			
1975	Cover Girl Models	Kulik		
1976	Hustler Squad			
1976	Project: Kill	Alok Lee	Special guest star	
1976	The Interceptors			
1977	Totoy Bato			
1977	Bawa't Himaymay ng Aking Laman			
1977	Too Hot to Handle	Sanchez	Also production co-ordinator	
1978	The Boys in Company C	Colonel Trang		
1978	Vampire Hookers			
1978	Patayin si... Mediavillo			
1978	Death Force			
1979	...At Muling Nagbaga ang Lupa			
1979	Durugin si Totoy Bato			
1979	Ang Lihim ng Guadalupe			
1982	Raw Force			
1986	Muslim .357			
1986	Iyo ang Tondo, Kanya ang Cavite			
1987	Maharlika			
1987	Target: Sparrow Unit			
1987	Mamaw			
1988	Strike Commando 2			
1988	Agila ng Maynila			
1989	The Expendables	Tranh Um Phu		
1994	Fortunes of War			
1995	Closer to Home (film)			
1997	Fight and Revenge			
2000	Kahit Demonyo Itutumba Ko			
2000	Tunay na Tunay: Gets Mo? Gets Ko!			
2001	Yamashita: The Tiger's Treasure			

=== Television ===
Year	Title	Role	Notes	Ref.
1959	Counterthrust		Plane from Tokyo	
1988	A Dangerous Life	Major General Prospero Olivas	Miniseries	
