= Hemisphere Pictures =

- Industry: Film production, film distribution
- Headquarters: Philippines
- Products: Films

Hemisphere Pictures was a film production and distribution company that specialised in movies from the Philippines.

== Filmography ==
- Terror Is a Man (1959)
- The Walls of Hell (1964)
- Moro Witch Doctor (1964)
- The Ravagers (1965)
- Brides of Blood (1968)
- The Mad Doctor of Blood Island (1969)
- Beast of Blood (1970)
- Savage Sisters (1974)
- Ganito Kami Noon, Paano Kayo Ngayon? (1976)
- Sinong kapiling? Sinong kasiping? (1977)
- Banta ng Kahapon (1977)
- Kamakalawa (1981)

== See also ==
- Kane W. Lynn
