= Gerardo de Leon =

Filipino film director (1913-1981)

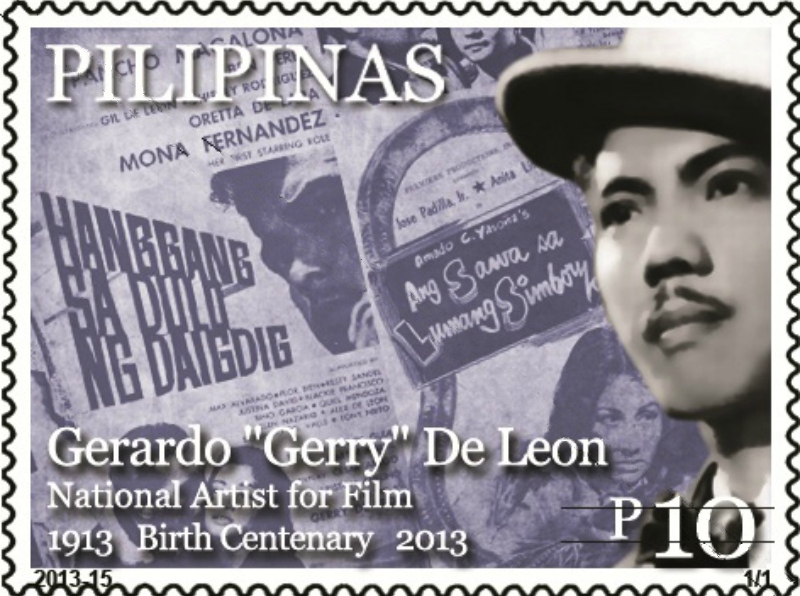
- Gerardo de Leon on a 2013 stamp of the Philippines
- Born: 12 September 1913; Manila, Philippine Islands
- Died: 25 July 1981 (aged 67); Manila, Philippines
- Occupations: Actor, film director
- Years active: 1934–1976
- Spouse: Fely Vallejo
- Children: 2 daughters
- Awards: Order of National Artists of the Philippines

Gerardo de Leon (12 September 1913 – 25 July 1981) was a Filipino film director and actor. He was posthumously conferred as a National Artist of the Philippines for Film in 1982.

== Biography ==
De Leon, who was born Gerardo Ilagan, was a member of the Ilagan clan of Philippine motion pictures, which includes Robert Arevalo, Conrado Conde, Angel Esmeralda, Eddie Ilagan, musical scorer Tito Arévalo, and his daughter Liberty Ilagan. De Leon was a medical doctor by profession, but his ultimate love for film won him over. He made his acting debut in the 1934 film Ang Dangal. He acted in eight other films before becoming a director. The first film he directed was Bahay-Kubo (1939), starring Fely Vallejo, an actress whom he later married.

De Leon produced a number of anti-American propaganda films during World War II, in collaboration with the occupying Japanese forces and Japanese director Yutaka Abe, who personally chose De Leon for the projects. De Leon was arrested and charged with treason after the Japanese were defeated, and was almost executed by the Filipino government. But at the last minute, he was pardoned when evidence came to light that all during the war, he had secretly assisted the Filipino resistance as well.

Nicknamed "Manong", de Leon is the most awarded film director in the history of the Filipino Academy of Movie Arts and Sciences' FAMAS Awards. From 1952 to 1971, he was awarded seven FAMAS Awards, three of them received consecutively. His 1961 film The Moises Padilla Story was selected as the Philippine entry for the Best Foreign Language Film at the 32nd Academy Awards, but was not accepted as a nominee.

All of the films for which he won Best Director also won Best Picture at the FAMAS, namely Sawa sa Lumang Simboryo (1952), Hanggang sa Dulo ng Daigdig (1958), Huwag Mo Akong Limutin (1960), Noli Me Tangere (1961, adapted from the novel of the same title), El Filibusterismo (1962), Daigdig ng Mga Api (1965), and Lilet (1971). One of his unfinished projects was Juan de la Cruz (1972) with Fernando Poe Jr.

He is known to fans of cult horror films for the handful of 1960s horror movies he directed, some co-directed with his friend Eddie Romero and co-financed with American money. These films included Terror Is a Man (1959), The Blood Drinkers/ Blood Is the Color of Night (1964), Curse of the Vampires/ Whisper to the Wind (1966), Brides of Blood (1968), and Mad Doctor of Blood Island (1969). Roger Corman hired him in 1971 to direct his gritty Women in Prison film Women in Cages (1971), featuring Pam Grier as a sadistic prison warden and Philippines sex symbol Sofia Moran.

== Death ==
De Leon died on July 25, 1981, at age 67.

== Personal life ==
He was married to Fely Vallejo (1918–2013). She outlived him by 32 years, dying at age 95 in 2013. Vallejo was a pre-war era actress who played a starring role in his directorial debut movie Bahay-Kubo (1938). Together they have 2 children, Liberty Ilagan (July 6, 1943 – 2020) and Maria Fe "Baby" (born 1949), the widow of actor Ronaldo Valdez. Liberty was also an actress (but has since left showbiz) and was married to former actor/famous restaurateur, Rod Ongpauco (screen-named Rod Evans) (born 1945), who is also a paternal uncle of actress Heart Evangelista, with whom she has 3 children. Whilst her sister, Marife Ilagan was married to actor Ronaldo Valdez (1947–2023) with whom they had two children, Janno Gibbs and Melissa, who are also both actors in their own right.

== Filmography ==
=== Film ===
Year	Title	Notes	Ref(s):
1938	Bahay Kubo		
1938	Mga Sugar ng Puso		
1938	Makiling		
1940	Estrellita ("Little Star")		
1941	Ang Maestra ("The Teacher")		
1943	Dawn of Freedom		
1947	Mameng, Iniibig Kita		
1950	48 Oras ("48 Hours")		
1951	Sisa		
1951	Diego Silang		
1952	Bagong Umaga ("A New Morning")		
1952	Sawa sa Lumang Simboryo (The Python in the Old Dome)		
1953	Dyesebel (a mermaid character in Filipino fiction)		
1954	Pedro Penduko		
1954	Ifuago		
1955	Sanda Wong		
1956	Saigon		
1957	Bakya Mo Neneng		
1957	Kamay ni Cain		
1957	Bicol Express		
1958	Hanggang sa Dulo ng Daigdig ("Till the End of the World")		
1959	Terror Is a Man	a.k.a. Blood Creature	
1960	Viuda de Oro ("The Golden Widow")		
1960	Huwag Mo Akong Limutin ("Don't Forget Me")	Also writer	
1961	The Moises Padilla Story		
1961	Noli Me Tángere		
1961	Apollo Robles		
1962	El filibusterismo	Also writer	
1962	Ako ang Katarungan		
1964	Anak ni Dyesebel		
1964	The Walls of Hell	a.k.a. Intramuros	
1964	The Blood Drinkers	Original title: Kulay Dugo ang Gabi a.k.a. Blood Is the Color of Night, The Vampire People.	
1965	Magandang Bituin ("The Good Star")		
1965	Ang Daigdig ng Mga Api	Possibly a lost film	
1965	Tagumpay ng Mahirap	Segment "The President"	
1966	Curse of the Vampires	Original title: Ibulong Mo sa Hangin	
1966	Brides of Blood	co-director with Eddie Romero	
1967	The Gold Bikini		
1969	Brownout		
1969	The Mad Doctor of Blood Island	a.k.a. Tomb of the Living Dead co-director with Eddie Romero	
1971	Playpen		
1971	Women in Cages		
1972	Lilet		
1975	Fe, Esperanza, Caridad (translation: Faith, Hope and Charity)		
1975	Banaue: Stairway to the Sky		
1976	Juan dela Cruz (unfinished)		
