= Tito Arévalo =

Filipino actor (1911–2000)

- Born: Eustacio Arévalo; March 29, 1911; Tondo, Manila City, Metro Manila, Luzon, Philippine Islands
- Died: December 4, 2000 (aged 89); Manila City, Metro Manila, Luzon, Philippines
- Occupations: Actor; musician
- Years active: 1935–2000
- Spouse: Guadalupe Francisco
- Children: 3 (including Robert)

Eustacio Ylagan (Tagalog pronunciation: [ɐˈrɛbɐlo]; March 29, 1911 – December 4, 2000), better known by his stage name Tito Arévalo, was a Filipino actor and musician.

== Personal life ==
He grew up in Tondo, Manila. He was married to Guadalupe Francisco Ylagan, a woman who hails from Manila and they are the parents of Cora Ylagan Evangelista, Deanna Ylagan Rathbun and actor Robert Arevalo. He is the uncle of actors Jay Ilagan and Liberty Ilagan and was also related to Filipino director Gerardo de Leon. He made his film debut in 1934 in Dasalang Pilak.

== Filmography ==
- Dasalang Pilak (1934)
- Sa Paanan ng Krus (1936)
- Nasaan Ka, Irog (1937)
- Anak ng Kadiliman (1937)
- Dasalang Perlas (1938)
- Isang Halik Lamang (1938)
- Ama at Anak (1939)
- Lihim ng Dagat-Dagatan (1939)
- Yaman ng Mahirap (1939)
- Prinsesa ng Kumintang (1940)
- Ang Tiktik (1941)
- Ang Iyong Ina (1946)
- Ikaw Na! (1946)
- Hanggang Pier (1946)
- Sanggano (1947)
- Ang Kanyang Lihim (1947)
- Lola Basiang (1947)
- Always (Kay Ganda Mo) (1949)
- Huwag Ka Nang Magtampo (1950)
- Ang Manyika ng Sta. Monica (1954)
- Batalyon Pilipino (sa Korea) (1954)
- Torpe (1955)
- Target Domino (1966)
- Brownout (1969)
- Sarung Banggi (1972)
- Cariñosa (1973)
- Isang Taong Walang Dios (1989)
- Batas ng .45 (1991)

=== As composer ===
- Ikaw Na! (1946)
- Lola Basiang (1947)
- Always (Kay Ganda Mo) (1949)
- Ang Manyika ng Sta. Monica (1954)
- Eskandalosa (1954)
- Kung Ako'y Maging Dalaga (1954)
- Batalyon Pilipino (sa Korea) (1954)
- May Bakas ang Lumipas (Aklat ng Pag-ibig) (1954)
- Saigon (1956)
- Margarita (1956)
- Haring Tulisan (1956)
- Matandang Tinale (1958)
- Glory at Dawn (1958)
- Kilabot sa Sta. Barbara (1958)
- Mekeni, Abe (1959)
- Huwag Mo Akong Limutin (1960)
- Markado (1960)
- Ako'y Alipin ng Opio (1961)
- Sakristan Mayor (1961)
- Noli Me Tángere (1961)
- The Moises Padilla Story (1961)
- NBI (1961)
- El filibusterismo (1962)
- Apat Na Agimat (1962)
- Mariveles (1964)
- Intramuros (The Walls of Hell) (1964)
- Hanggang May Kalaban (1965)
- Darna at ang Babaing Tuod (1965)
- Maria Cecilia (1965)
- Tagumpay ng Mahirap ("The Man" and "The President" segments, 1965)
- Tatlong Kasaysayan ng Pag-ibig (1966)
- 7 Gabi sa Hongkong (1966)
- Wanted: Johnny L (1966)
- Room 69 (1966)
- Solo Flight (1967)
- The Gold Bikini (1967)
- Karate Commandos (1968)
- Brownout (1969)
- Sarung Banggi (1972)
- The Professional (1972)
- Cariñosa (1973)
- Binhi (1973)
- Bituing Marikit (1973)
- Dyesebel at ang Mahiwagang Kabibe (1973)
- Nueva Vizcaya (1973)
- Anak ng Asuwang (1973)
- Ang Hiwaga ni Maria Cinderella (1973)
- Phantom Lady (1974)
- Kampanerang Kuba (1974)
- South Seas (1974)
- Urduja (1974)
- Walang Duwag sa Kayumanggi (1975)
- Banaue: Stairway to the Sky (1975)
- Dugo at Pag-ibig sa Kapirasong Lupa (1975)
- Mother and Daughter (1975)
- Alat (1975)
- Diwang Kayumanggi (Prinsesang Mandirigma) (1975)
- Pugad ng Agila (1976)
- Ang Katumbas Ay Buhay (1976)
- Hubad Na Bayani (1977)
- Mga Sariwang Bulaklak (1977)
- Isang Kahig, Isang Tuka sa Langit at Lupa (1978)
- Hermano Puli (1979)
- Wasakin ang Sindikato (1979)
- Harabas at Kidlat (1979)
