= Magalona =

Magalona is a surname. Notable people with the surname include:

- Enrique Magalona (1891–1960), Filipino senator
- Pancho Magalona (1923–1998), Filipino actor, son of Enrique
- Francis Magalona (1964–2009), Filipino rapper, son of Pancho
- Maxene Magalona (born 1986), Filipino actress, daughter of Francis
- Frank Magalona (born 1987), Filipino actor and rapper, son of Francis
- Saab Magalona (born 1988), Filipino actress and photographer, daughter of Francis
- Elmo Magalona (born 1994), Filipino actor and singer, son of Francis
