= Hiro Peralta =

Half-Filipino quarter-German quarter-Portuguese actor

- Born: Hirojenel Benz Magalona Peralta; November 7, 1994 (age 32); Manila, Philippines
- Other name: Hiro Magalona
- Occupations: Businessman; Actor; TV Host (former)
- Years active: 2010–2018; 2024–present
- Agent: Sparkle (2010–2018)
- Notable work: Sam (Parikoy)
- Height: 1.86 m (6 ft 1 in)
- Relatives: Francis Magalona (uncle/second-cousin-once-removed); Pancho Magalona (granduncle/first-cousin-twice-removed); Maxene Magalona (third cousin); Frank Magalona (third cousin); Saab Magalona (third cousin); Elmo Magalona (third cousin); Enrique B. Magalona

Hirojenel Benz "Hiro" Magalona Peralta (born November 7, 1994) is a Filipino businessman and actor who is best known for his roles in Little Nanay and Tween Hearts.

== Early life and education ==
Peralta was born in Manila and raised by his uncle's family in Quezon City. His father, Engelbert Garcia Peralta, was a sous chef turned custom broker, and his mother, Jean Senen Magalona Peralta, is a crooner in Japan. Peralta's mother is the second cousin of Francis Magalona. Peralta's elder brother, model Benjamin "Benjie" Peralta, was reportedly murdered in 2009, which was the reason behind her father's initial disapproval for him to enter the entertainment business.

Peralta spent his primary education at Esteban Abada Elementary School in 2006, his secondary education in St. Patrick School of Quezon City, where he and Liza Soberano were schoolmates. He was admitted to Trinity University of Asia, where he pursued his bachelor's degree in business administration majoring in financial management, but later deferred to pursue show business.

== Career ==
He was discovered by German "Kuya Germs" Moreno in 2010 and made his first appearance on Moreno's variety show Walang Tulugan with the Master Showman under the screen name "Hiro Magalona" due to his father's initial disapproval following his brother's demise. In 2013, his management changed his screen name to his actual surname. Peralta went on to portray a leading man in Anna Karenina, Little Nanay (2015), and various anthology series costarring multi-awarded actors. Peralta was also a cohost in the long-running morning show, Unang Hirit, before he left show business in 2018 with Sherlock Jr. as his last project.

As of 2025, Peralta lives a private life as a businessman. In 2023, he appeared as a guest player with his friends in Family Feud Philippines.

== Filmography ==
=== Film ===
Year	Title	Role
2011	Shake, Rattle & Roll 13	Andoy
2012	The Mommy Returns	Emil
2014	Kamkam	Anton
2015	Tomodachi	Rafael
2017	This Time I'll Be Sweeter	Paul
2025	Ang Aking Mga Anak	Israel

=== Television ===
Year	Title	Role	Notes
2010–2016	Walang Tulugan with the Master Showman	Himself	Host / Performer
2010	Maynila: The Best Girl	Topher	Main Cast
2011–2012	Tween Hearts	Bayani 'Ian' De Castro	Supporting Role
2011	Iglot	Luis Bustamante	Supporting Role
2011	Regal Shocker: Anito	Onid	Main Cast
2011	The King of Fighters 2000	K'	Voice Only
2011	The King of Fighters '99	K'	Voice Only
2011	Party Pilipinas	Himself	Guest / Performer
2012	The King of Fighters 2003	K'	Voice Only
2012	The King of Fighters 2002	K'	Voice Only
2012	The King of Fighters 2001	K'	Voice Only
2012	Biritera	Teofi	Supporting Role
2012	Maynila: Brave Heart	Benj	Supporting Role
2012	Cielo de Angelina	James Aragon	Supporting Role
2013	Anna Karenina	Brian	Main Cast
2014	The King of Fighters XI	K'	Voice Only
2014	My BFF	Baron	Supporting Role
2014–2015	Kamen Rider OOO	Eiji Hino / Kamen Rider OOO	Voice Only
2015	Pari 'Koy	Sam	Supporting Role
2015	Maynila: My Mother, My Yaya	Vince	Main Role
2015	Karelasyon: Cougar	Mico	Main Role
2015	Maynila: Christmas is My Heart	Chino	Main Role
2015	The King of Fighters XIII	K'	Voice Only
2015	Little Nanay	Archie San Pedro	Main Role / Protagonist
2016	Magpakailanman: My Little Wife	Teddy	Main Role
2016	Dishkarte of the Day	Himself	Guest
2016	Magpakailanman: You and Me Against the World	Bong	Main Role
2016	Unang Hirit	Himself	Host / Co-host
2016	Wagas	Ely	Main Role
2017	The King of Fighters XIV	K'	Voice Only
2017	Yu-Gi-Oh! 5D's	Yusei Fudo	Voice Only
2017	Karelasyon: Love Is Blind	Anton	Main Role
2017	Alyas Robin Hood	Miguel Rodrigo	Guest Appearance / Antagonist
2017	Road Trip	Himself	Guest
2017	Wagas: Haplos ng Isang Kuba	Renz	Main Role
2018	Sherlock Jr.	Bart Lopez	Supporting Role / Antagonist
2023	Family Feud Philippines	Himself	Guest (no longer as an actor)
2026–present	ASAP XP	Himself	Guest co-host / Performer

== Accolades ==
=== Awards and nominations ===
Year	Award-giving body	Category	Work/Award	Result	Ref.
2011	25th PMPC Star Awards for TV	Best Male TV Personality	Reel Love Presents: Tween Hearts	Nominated	
