= Kaleidoscope World (Francis Magalona song) =

1995 song by Francis Magalona

Single by Francis Magalona

from the album FreeMan
- Released: 1995
- Recorded: 1994
- Genre: Alternative rock
- Length: 4:57
- Label: Musiko; BMG
- Songwriter(s): Francis Magalona; Perfecto de Castro

"Kaleidoscope World" is a 1995 song performed by the Filipino rapper Francis Magalona. It was first included in his 1995 studio album FreeMan. The song is also included in a later album, Best of FrancisM.

The song's music video was directed by the director/cinematographer Raymond Red, and showed Magalona, his band Hardware Syndrome, his backup singers the Evil Stepsisters, and the respective children of Magalona and Red at that time.

== Release and legacy ==
The song went on to win the 1996 Awit Award for Best Produced Record of the Year, and the 1996 NU 107 Rock Award for Song of the Year.

After Magalona's death, the song was the one used in many of the tributes to the artist, including an audio-visual has been paid presentation from Eat Bulaga!, the noontime variety program of which Magalona was a co-host, and a short rendering of the song first at the Eraserheads' "Final Set" reunion concert 2009, which the band dedicated to Magalona.

In May 2013, Francis' son Elmo Magalona released a remake of the song as a duet between him and his dad entitled "Kaleidoscope World Forever More", produced by Oishi. An accompanying music video was created featuring Elmo digitally inserted into the original Music Video.

In July 2020, albeit being held virtually due to the COVID-19 pandemic in the Philippines, the rendition of the song was performed by Gary Valenciano, Chito Miranda, Raimund Marasigan, Yael Yuzon, Barq, and two of his children Elmo and Saab Magalona-Bacarro in a tribute as Francis was being awarded the Myx Magna Award in the Myx Awards 2020.

== Cover versions ==
- Parokya Ni Edgar (on their 2004 live album Inuman Sessions Vol. 1, released through Universal Records)
