= Ulan (Rivermaya song) =

1995 single by Filipino band Rivermaya

Single by Rivermaya

from the album RiverMaya
- Released: 1995
- Genre: Pinoy rock; alternative rock; jangle pop
- Length: 4:29
- Label: Musiko Records & BMG Records (Pilipnas) Inc.
- Composers: Rico Blanco, Nathan Azarcon
- Lyricist: Rico Blanco
- Producers: Chito S. Roño, Lizza G. Nakpil

Rivermaya singles chronology
"Ulan" (1995)	"214" (1995)

"Ulan" (lit. 'Rain') is the debut single by Filipino rock band Rivermaya, released in 1995 from their self-titled debut album (1994). The song was produced by Chito S. Roño and Lizza G. Nakpil.

The song was written by rhythm guitarist and keyboardist Rico Blanco and Nathan Azarcon, the band's bassist. Blanco's keyboard solo was featured on the instrumental break. On the intro, the guitars were played by Blanco and Perf de Castro.

== Personnel ==
- Bamboo Mañalac: vocals
- Rico Blanco: keyboards, rhythm guitar, backing vocals
- Perf de Castro: lead guitar
- Nathan Azarcon: bass guitar
- Mark Escueta: drums, percussion

== Cover versions ==
The song was covered by Janine Teñoso for the 2019 film of the same name.
