= Tita Duran =

Filipino actress (1928–1990)

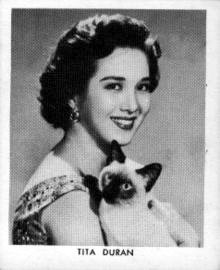
- Duran in 1953
- Born: Teresita Rigo Durango; 30 September 1928; Manila, Philippine Islands
- Died: 27 April 1990 (aged 61); Manila, Philippines
- Occupation: Actress
- Years active: 1935–1958; 1983; 1988
- Spouse: Enrique Magalona Jr. (m. 1948)
- Children: 9 (inc. Francis Magalona)
- Relatives: Enrique Magalona Sr. (father-in-law); Saab Magalona (granddaughter); Frank Magalona (grandson); Elmo Magalona (grandson); Maxene Magalona (granddaughter); Regine Velasquez (niece); Ogie Alcasid (nephew-in-law)

Tita Duran (born Teresita Rigo Durango; September 30, 1928 – April 27, 1990), was a Filipino actress whose career spanned more than two decades. After the second world war, she achieved continued success as a romantic lead in musical dramas with frequent on-screen partner Pancho Magalona.

== Personal life ==
Teresita Rigo Durango was born September 30, 1928. Duran married Pancho Magalona on October 2, 1948. She was the mother of Francis Magalona and grandmother of Maxene Magalona. Duran died on April 27, 1990, in Manila, Philippines, she was 61 years old.

== Career ==
Duran played a seven-year-old child abandoned by her mother in the 1936 family drama, Awit ng mga Ulila (The Songs of the Orphans).

In 1938, Sampaguita Pictures cast Duran in a tear-jerker movie titled Inang Mahal (Dear Mother). Her second movie for Sampaguita Pictures was Ang Magsasampaguita (The Sampaguita Vendor).

Duran made two movies for LVN Pictures: Pangarap (Dream) and Sawing Gantimpala (Lost Prize), both in 1940.

She was named the most popular child star of Pre-war Philippine cinema.

After World War II, she returned to Sampaguita Pictures. She was in a war film with Carmen Rosales titled Guerilyera, and typecasted in numerous musical films paired with some of Sampaguita's finest actors. Her last movie with Sampaguita Pictures was Isang Halik Mo, Pancho (One Kiss From You, Pancho). She made Maria Went to Town for Deegar Cinema, Inc.

In 1987, Duran was awarded the Lifetime Achievement Award by the Film Academy of the Philippines.

== Filmography ==
=== Film ===
- 1936 - Awit ng mga Ulila
- 1936 - Sa Paanan ng Krus
- 1937 - Milagro ng Nazareno sa Quiapo
- 1937 - Anak ng Kadiliman
- 1938 - Mariang Alimango
- 1938 - Alipin ng Palad
- 1938 - Ang Magmamani
- 1938 - Ang Pusong Wasak
- 1939 - Yaman ang mahirap
- 1939 - Palaboy ng Diyos
- 1939 - Tunay Na Ina
- 1939 - Ang Magsasampaguita
- 1939 - Inang Mahal
- 1939 - Tatlong pagkabirhen
- 1939 - Anak ng Hinagpis
- 1940 - Sawing gantingpala
- 1940 - Pangarap
- 1940 - Nang Mahawi ang ulap
- 1940 - Awit ng Magulang
- 1940 - Lihim ng Lumang Simbahan
- 1940 - Sa Duyang ng Pagmamahal
- 1940 - Bahaghari
- 1941 - Paraiso
- 1941 - Panambitan
- 1946 - Guerilyera
- 1946 - Maynila
- 1947 - Dahil Sa Ina
- 1947 - Lantang Asahar
- 1947 - Ang Kapilya sa May Daang Bakal
- 1948 - Ang Anak ng Dagat
- 1948 - Pamana ng Tulisan
- 1948 - Bulaklak na Walang Pangalan
- 1948 - Tatlong Puso
- 1948 - Maharlika
- 1949 - Ulilang Kalapati
- 1949 - Always kay ganda mo
- 1949 - Milagro ng Birhen ng mga Rosas
- 1949 - Dahil sa Iyo
- 1949 - Tala sa Umaga
- 1949 - Sa Piling Mo
- 1950 - Huwag Ka ng Magtampo!
- 1950 - Umaga na, Giliw
- 1950 - Kay Ganda Mo Neneng
- 1950 - Umaga ng Neneng
- 1951 - Kasintahan sa Pangarap
- 1952 - Barbaro
- 1952 - Buhay Pilipino
- 1952 - Sabas, ang Barbaro
- 1952 - Cumbanchera
- 1953 - Ang Ating Pag-ibig
- 1953 - Sa Isang Sulyap Mo Tita
- 1953 - Vod-A-Vil
- 1954 - Sa Isang Halik Mo Pancho
- 1955 - Maria Went to Town
- 1956 - Bella Filipina
- 1956 - Mr. & Mrs.
- 1956 - Rockin' the Cha-Cha
- 1957 - Bicol Express
- 1957 - Yaya Maria
- 1958 - Tatak ni Solomon
- 1977 - Sinong Kapiling? Sinong Kasiping?
- 1983 - Bundok ng Susong Dalaga
- 1988 - Isusumbong Kita sa Diyos
