= Whole Lotta Lovin' =

Whole Lotta Lovin' or Whole Lot of Loving may refer to:

- Whole Lotta Lovin' (Fats Domino song), 1959
- "A Whole Lotta Lovin' ", a 1971 song by Anita Carter
- "That's a Whole Lotta Lovin' (You Give Me)", a 1973 song by Kenny Starr
- "Whole Lotta Lovin' " (Six song), 1975
- "Whole Lotta Lovin' ", a song by Huey Lewis from the 1986 album Fore!
- "Whole Lotta' Lovin", a song by Filipino rapper Francis Magalona from the 1998 album The Oddventures of Mr. Cool
- "Whole Lotta Loving", a song by B.B. King from the 2012 album Ladies and Gentlemen... Mr. B.B. King
- "Whole Lotta Lovin' " (Mustard and Travis Scott song), 2016
