= Spooky Valentine =

2012 Philippine television drama series

- Also known as: Spooky Valentine Presents
- Genre: Romantic drama; Horror
- Directed by: Uro Q. dela Cruz
- Country of origin: Philippines
- Original language: Tagalog
- No. of episodes: 4

Production
- Camera setup: Multiple-camera setup
- Running time: 30–60 minutes
- Production company: GMA Entertainment TV

Original release
- Network: GMA Network
- Release: February 4 – February 25, 2012

Related
- Spooky Nights

Spooky Valentine is a 2012 Philippine television drama romance horror anthology series broadcast by GMA Network. It premiered on February 4, 2012. The series concluded on February 25, 2012, with a total of four episodes.

== Episodes ==
=== "Maestra" ===
Airdate	February 4, 2012
Elena, a loving wife and mother, and an ideal teacher who volunteers to practice her profession in a far-flung province. There, she meets a mysterious old woman, whose seemingly harmless touch drastically changes Elena's life. When Elena returns home to her family, she begins to behave oddly. Her husband Nestor (TJ Trinidad) and their daughter Onay notice many things strange about her actuations. Who used to be a loving wife and mother has become a blood-thirsty cannibal. Odd as it may be, Elena's transformation has not shaken Nestor's love for her. He decides to defend his wife against the angry mob running after her. But if Nestor could accept his wife's predicament, Elena couldn't. She takes her own life hoping that this would mean everyone could now live in peace. But when Nestor, Onay and Elena's mother put flowers on her grave her arm rises from the earth.
Director	Uro Q. dela Cruz
Cast and characters	Bianca King as Elena; TJ Trinidad as Nestor; Ehra Madrigal; Irma Adlawan

=== "Masahista" ===
Airdate	February 11, 2012
Patrick (Antonio Aquitania), a massage-parlor owner, who meets an accident that would render him suffering from locunar amnesia. After being discharged from the hospital, he resumes work at the massage parlor hoping that this would aid in his recovery. But just as he thinks everything in his life is falling back into place, something strange happens: a ghost of a beautiful woman frequently appears to him, seemingly wanting to reveal to him something. Ripped off his memories, Patrick couldn't comprehend that the ghost was that of Noemi (Katrina Halili), a former masseuse who worked at his parlor. Noemi and Patrick's womanizing brother Mike (Paolo Contis) have had an affair until one day, it took a tragic end. As Patrick recovers his memory, he begins to solve the puzzle, piece by piece.
Cast and characters	Katrina Halili as Noemi / Melissa; Antonio Aquitania as Patrick; Paolo Contis as Mike

=== "Manibela" ===
Airdate	February 18, 2012
Cast and characters	Aljur Abrenica as Ariel; Jackie Rice as Joan; Maxene Magalona as Jellie; Mona Louise Rey as Paula; Frank Magalona as Jonas

=== "Manikurista" ===
Airdate	February 25, 2012
Director	Uro Q. dela Cruz
Cast and characters	Albert "Betong" Sumaya Jr. as Curie; Jhiz Deocareza as Yoyo; Ryan Eigenmann as Kiko; Joey Paras as Margie; Chariz Solomon as Nicolette

== Ratings ==
According to AGB Nielsen Philippines' Mega Manila household television ratings, the pilot episode of Spooky Valentine earned a 20.5% rating. The final episode scored a 19.9% rating.
