= Rivermaya (album) =

Studio album by Rivermaya
- Released: November 1994 (Note: Though the exact date is unknown, the album was reportedly launched around November 1994.)
- Recorded: 1994
- Studio: Audio Captain Inc. Perfect Music Studio
- Genre: Pinoy rock; alternative rock; pop rock; hard rock; arena rock
- Length: 42:31
- Label: Musiko Records & BMG Records (Pilipinas), Inc.
- Producer: Rico Blanco; Perfecto de Castro

Rivermaya chronology
Rivermaya (1994)	Trip (1996)

Singles from Rivermaya
- 1. "Ulan"/"Awit ng Kabataan" Released: 1995; 2. "214" Released: 1995; 3. "Bring Me Down" Released: 1995

Rivermaya (stylized as RiverMaya) is the self-titled debut studio album by Filipino rock band Rivermaya, released in November 1994, by Musiko Records & BMG Records (Pilipinas), Inc.

The album received positive reviews from critics, who praised the songwriting of keyboardist Rico Blanco. The album sold well upon release, due to its hit singles like "214", "Ulan", and "Awit ng Kabataan". Rivermaya has been certified triple platinum by the Philippine Association of the Record Industry (PARI). With 120,000 copies sold, the record is one of the best-selling albums in the Philippines.

== Background ==
Xaga formed in 1994, and were managed by Lizza Nakpil and Chito Roño. The band's original lineup consisted of Jesse Gonzales on vocals, Kenneth Ilagan on guitars, Nathan Azarcon on bass guitar, Rome Velayo on drums, and Rico Blanco on keyboards. In the process of grueling practice sessions, Gonzales and Velayo were respectively replaced by Bamboo Mañalac and Mark Escueta, both of whom were invited by Azarcon to join. Ilagan had also left the band for personal reasons concerning his studies; Perfecto de Castro was added to fill in his role. Shortly thereafter, Xaga disbanded to form a new group that came to be Rivermaya.

== Release and promotion ==
Rivermaya was released in November 1994 on cassette and CD format. A few months after the album was released, the band released the album's first single, "Ulan / Awit ng Kabataan". The two were separate songs (tracks 5 and 10 on Rivermaya), but were released together as a double A-side single. It was then followed by "214", the second single. It received heavy radio airplay and achieved massive popularity, and remains as one of the band's most memorable hits. The last single from the album was "Bring Me Down".

== Reception ==
=== Critical response ===
Professional ratings
Review scores
Source	Rating
AllMusic	4/5 stars

The album received generally positive reviews from critics. David Gonzales of AllMusic gave Rivermaya four stars out of five, calling it a "self-assured debut effort". He praised the tracks "Revolution" and "214", and noted that it encompasses the band's sound. He also commented on "20 Million", remarking the track is an "elaborately produced vehicle", containing piano and a wonderful string section. Gonzales enjoyed the album's melodic nature as well as Rico Blanco's songwriting, saying: "The plaudits must go to keyboardist Rico Blanco, who wrote six of the album's ten songs, and participated in the writing of the other four songs."

=== Commercial performance ===
Rivermaya received gold certification status a few months after being released. Eventually, sales grew and the album was certified triple platinum by the Philippine Association of the Record Industry (PARI), denoting sales of over 120,000 copies.

== Aftermath ==
The album's success catapulted Rivermaya into one of the Philippines' premier rock bands of the 1990s, along with Eraserheads. The band frequently held live performances, appeared in television programs, and embarked on extensive tours around the country. Despite the popularity that established the band's status, it also bought conflict and disagreements to the members and managers.

In 1995, Perfecto de Castro left the group, citing creative differences with managers Lizza Nakpil and Chito Roño as the reason for his departure. He went on to form a power trio called TriAxis. Even with de Castro's exit, Rivermaya decided to forge on, and began working on their second studio album.

== Accolades ==
Publication	Country	Accolade	Year	Rank
Esquire Magazine	Philippines	10 Essential OPM Albums of the 1990s	2019	*

* denotes an unordered list

== Track listing ==
All tracks are written by Rico Blanco, except where noted.

No.	Title	Writer(s)	Length
1.	"Revolution"	Blanco, Nathan Azarcon	3:36
2.	"Bring Me Down"		4:32
3.	"Ground"	Blanco, Perfecto de Castro	5:06
4.	"20 Million"		3:54
5.	"Ulan"	Blanco, Azarcon	4:29
6.	"Halik sa Araw"		3:57
7.	"Gravity"	de Castro	4:10
8.	"214"		4:33
9.	"Hate"		3:24
10.	"Awit ng Kabataan"		4:50

== Personnel ==
Track numbers noted in parentheses below are based on track numbering.

Rivermaya

- Bamboo Mañalac – lead vocals
- Rico Blanco – keyboards, guitars, backing vocals, co-vocals (2)
- Perfecto de Castro – guitars, backing vocals
- Nathan Azarcon – bass guitar, backing vocals
- Mark Escueta – drums, percussion

Artwork

- Dave Yu – design
- Mario Joson – art direction
- Raymund Isaac – photography

Additional musicians

- Francisco Llorin – cello (4)

Production

- Rico Blanco – production
- Perfecto de Castro – production
- Buddy Medina – executive production
- Rudy Y. Tee – executive production
- Arnold Jallores – mixing, engineer
- Lizza G. Nakpil – management
- Chito S. Roño – management
- Vic Valenciano – A&R

== In popular culture ==
- The song Ulan & Halik sa Araw are included in soundtrack of the movie "Pare Ko".
- The song "214" was covered by JM de Guzman for the theme song of the 2019 romantic drama film Alone/Together.
- The song "214" was covered by Jeremiah Tiangco for the theme song of the 2022 TV series Lolong.
- The song "214" was covered by Luke Mejares and was featured on the special edition of his Solo debut album "Stop, Luke & Listen".
- The song "Ulan" was covered by Janine Teñoso for the theme song of the 2019 romantic drama film of the same name.
