= The Mommy Returns =

2012 Filipino family comedy horror film

- Directed by: Joel C. Lamangan
- Written by: Senedy Que
- Produced by: Lily Monteverde; Roselle Monteverde-Teo
- Starring: Gabby Concepcion; Ruffa Gutierrez; Pokwang
- Cinematography: Mo Zee
- Edited by: Vanessa De Leon; Tara Illenberger
- Music by: Cesar Francis Concio
- Production company: Regal Entertainment
- Distributed by: Regal Entertainment
- Release date: May 9, 2012
- Running time: 115 minutes
- Country: Philippines
- Language: Filipino
- Box office: ₱30.6 million

The Mommy Returns is a 2012 Filipino comedy horror movie produced by Regal Films. It was released in Philippine cinemas on May 9, 2012. The title is a direct reference to the 2001 American filmThe Mummy Returns.

== Plot ==
The Mommy Returns tells the story of a mother, Ruby, who dies right on the day of her 25th wedding anniversary with husband William. With her untimely death, she leaves behind her three children Amethyst, Topaz, and Sapphire.

Ruby is also temporarily trapped in PURGA (short for Purgatory) with its guardian, Dyoga, and the pesky Manny, the chicken pet of San Pedro.

When Catherine, a younger and prettier woman, comes into the life of William, Ruby escapes from PURGA and returns to earth as a ghost to drive Catherine out of the family she left behind.

== Cast ==
- Pokwang as Ruby Pascual-Martirez
- Gabby Concepcion as William Martirez
- Ruffa Gutierrez as Catherine Laurel-Martirez
- Kiray Celis as Amethyst "Amy" P. Martirez
- Gerald Pesigan as Topaz "Toffi" P. Martirez
- Jillian Ward as Sapphire "Saf" P. Martirez
- Gloria Diaz as Mabel Diaz-Laurel
- John Lapus as Diyoga
- Moi Bien as Inday Moi
- Kerbie Zamora as Gary
- Ervic Vijandre as Rodel
- Hiro Magalona as Emil

== Release ==
=== Distribution ===
The Mommy Returns had a premiere night in Cinema 9 of SM Megamall on May 8, 2012. It was released in Philippine cinemas on May 11, 2012.

=== Box office ===
The Mother's Story grossed P30.6 million in the Philippines after two weeks of release, according to figures from Box Office Mojo.

=== Critical reception ===
The Mommy Returns received generally negative reviews from local film critics. Mark Angelo Ching of PEP.ph stated that the film was not funny and only worked in its dramatic moments; he also commented on the dull performance of the cast.

Johanna Poblete of Business World said The Mommy Returns did not offer anything new, and did not "elevate the local movie industry". Philbert Dy of ClickTheCity.com said the movie was "a dreadful bore."

== See also ==
- List of ghost films
