= FreeMan 2 =

Studio album by Francis M.
- Released: September 23, 2000
- Recorded: 1999–2000
- Genre: Pinoy rap; Pinoy rock
- Length: 1:08:41
- Label: Greater East Asia Music; BMG Records (Pilipinas), Inc.

Francis M. chronology
Interscholastic (1999)	FreeMan 2 (2000)	The Story of Francis M. (The Ultimate OPM Collection) (2001)

Singles from FreeMan 2
- 1. "Luv 4 Lyf" Released: September 2000

FreeMan 2 is the eighth album by Filipino rapper Francis M., released on September 23, 2000, by BMG Records (Pilipinas) and Greater East Asia Music. The album is the follow-up to 1995's FreeMan. The song "Watawat" was previously released on the EP Interscholastic, with its music video paying tribute to the evolution of the Philippine flag. The carrier single "Luv 4 Lyf" a song about war and man's struggle for freedom.

== Track listing ==
No.	Title	Writer(s)	Length
1.	"Ollie"		0:42
2.	"Meltdown"	Francis Magalona / A. Tamayo	3:45
3.	"Watawat"	Francis Magalona / A. Tamayo	3:28
4.	"Cokimon"	DJ Coki	2:08
5.	"Good Friends"		0:56
6.	""Pintados""	Francis Magalona / A. Tamayo / F. Villanueva	2:57
7.	"Senseless"	F. Magalona /A. Rozul / Pantera	2:53
8.	"Imachination"	F. Magalona / A. Rozul	1:23
9.	"Sunglasses"	F. Magalona / J. Juanillo/ P. Pfiffiner / Hardware Syndrome / C. Hart	6:59
10.	"Wala Ka!"	F. Magalona / C. Sison / B. Aquino / F. Villanueva)	3:20
11.	"Magna Cum Nakaw"	F. Magalona / A. Rozul / Helmet	3:49
12.	"Bilib Ka Ba"		0:22
13.	"Kaligtasan (Featuring Andrew E.)"	F. Magalona / A. Espiritu / N. Mendez	4:36
14.	"Spirit Warriors"	F. Magalona / C. Sison / B. Aquino / F. Villanueva	4:36
15.	"Luv 4 Lyf"	F. Magalona / P. De Castro	4:13
16.	"Life Goes By"	Francis Magalona / A. Tamayo	3:59
17.	"DJ Mainland"		0:14
18.	"Wisdomination"	F. Magalona / V. Rodriguez / J. Luna	5:02
19.	"Migraine"	F. Magalona	3:32
20.	"Cokewalk Version 2000"	DJ Coki	2:10
21.	"Dubaiyistic"		0:27
22.	"Nais Ko"	Ryan Cayabyab	3:31
23.	"Kimo's Groove II"	DJ Kimozave	3:52
Total length:			1:08:41

== Personnel ==
Francis Magalona - Vocals

Hardware Syndrome Members:

- Boyet Aquino - Drums & Percussions
- Carlo Sison - Guitar
- Francis Villanueva - Bass
- DJ Kimozave - Turntable & Drum Machine

Additional Musicians:

- Evil Stepsisters - Additional Vocals
- Perfecto De Castro, Noel Mendez - Additional Guitars, back up vocals on "Luv 4 Lyf"
- Ollie Marasigan: Spoken Words On "Ollie"
- Michael V: Spoken Words On "Bilib Ka Ba?"
- Chris Haranhan: Spoken Words on "Good Friends"
- Miguel Jeteau: French Spoken Words on "Wala Ka"
- Andrew E - Rap on "Kaligtasan"
- Johnny Krush And Caine - Rap on "Sunglasses"
- Mastaplann - Rap on "Wisdomination"

== Album Credits ==
- Executive Producer: Rudy Tee
- A & R Executive: Vic Valenciano
- All songs are produced by: Francis Magalona except "Luv 4 Lyf" produced by Perfecto De Castro & Francis M, "Wisdomination" produced by Johnny Luna and Butch Velez of True Asiatik Tribe Production & Francis Magalona
- All songs are recorded, engineered, tweaked, mixed, mastered and fixed by: Angee Rozul at Tracks Studios except "Meltdown", "Pintados", "Watawat" and "Life Goes By" which was done at: Prodigi Audio by Albert Tamayo
