= Yo! (album) =

Studio album by Francis M.
- Released: August 1990
- Recorded: 1989–1990
- Genres: Filipino rap; hip-hop; pop
- Length: 58:29
- Languages: English; Filipino
- Label: OctoArts International Inc.
- Producers: Francis Magalona; Bob Guzman

Francis M. chronology
Yo! (1990)	Rap Is FrancisM (1992)

Singles from Yo!
- 1. "Loving You" Released: 1989; 2. "My Only Love" Released: 1989; 3. "Gotta Let 'Cha Know" Released: 1990; 4. "Cold Summer Nights" Released: 1990; 5. "Mga Kababayan" Released: 1990

Yo! is the debut studio album by Filipino rapper Francis M., released in August 1990 by OctoArts International Inc.. The album features the singles "Loving You" (a duet with his wife Pia Arroyo), "My Only Love", "Gotta Let 'Cha Know", "Cold Summer Nights", and "Mga Kababayan".

Yo! became the first successful local hip-hop album in the Philippines, opening the door to other hip-hop acts in the country.

== Track listing ==
=== LP and cassette versions ===
Side one
No.	Title	Writer(s)	Producer	Length
1.	"Gotta Let 'Cha Know"	Francis Magalona; Jimmy Antiporda; Martin Magalona	F. Magalona	3:21
2.	"My Only One"	F. Magalona; Mon Espia	F. Magalona	4:20
3.	"Cold Summer Nights"	Antiporda	Bob Guzman	4:28
4.	"Get on the Dance Floor" (Rob Base & DJ E-Z Rock cover)	Robert Ginyard	Guzman	3:52
5.	"The Mouth"	F. Magalona; Master of Disaster	Guzman	2:45

Side two
No.	Title	Writer(s)	Producer	Length
6.	"Don't Make Me Over" (Sybil cover)	Burt Bacharach; Hal David	Guzman	5:57
7.	"Mga Kababayan" (My Countrymen)	F. Magalona; Antiporda	Guzman	3:34
8.	"Loving You" (duet with Pia)	F. Magalona; Espia; Pia Arroyo	F. Magalona	4:54
9.	"IB Me (Wanna Be Me)"	F. Magalona; Espia	F. Magalona	4:32

=== CD version ===
Side one
No.	Title	Writer(s)	Producer	Length
1.	"Gotta Let 'Cha Know"	F. Magalona; Antiporda; M. Magalona	F. Magalona	3:21
2.	"My Only One"	F Magalona; Espia	F. Magalona	4:20
3.	"Cold Summer Nights"	Antiporda	Guzman	4:28
4.	"Get on the Dance Floor"	Ginyard	Guzman	3:52
5.	"Don't Make Me Over"	Bacharach; David	Guzman	5:57
6.	"Mga Kababayan"	F. Magalona; Antiporda	Guzman	3:34
7.	"Loving You" (duet with Pia)	F. Magalona; Espia; Arroyo	F. Magalona	4:54
8.	"IB Me (Wanna Be Me)"	F. Magalona; Espia	F. Magalona	4:32
9.	"The Mouth"	Magalona; Master of Disaster	Guzman	2:45
10.	"Gotta Let 'Cha Know" (12" version)	F. Magalona; Antiporda; M. Magalona	F. Magalona	7:47
11.	"Mga Kababayan" (7" version)	F. Magalona; Antiporda	Guzman	3:33
Total length:				58:29
