= Rap Is FrancisM =

Studio album by Francis M.
- Released: 1992
- Recorded: 1991
- Genre: Filipino rap
- Length: 61:56
- Languages: Filipino; English
- Label: OctoArts International Inc.
- Producers: Francis M.; DJ M.O.D.

Francis M. chronology
'Yo!' (1990)	Rap Is FrancisM (1992)	Meron Akong Ano! (1993)

Singles from Rap Is FrancisM
- 1. "Man from Manila" Released: 1991; 2. "Mga Praning" Released: 1992; 3. "Halalan" Released: 1992

Rap Is FrancisM is the second studio album by Filipino rapper Francis M., released in 1992 by OctoArts International Inc. (now PolyEast Records). The album features the singles "Man from Manila", "Mga Praning" (a song about drug addiction), and "Halalan" (written specifically for the 1992 Philippine general election), as well as covers of the Heber Bartolome song "Tayo'y Mga Pinoy" and the Madness song "Our House".

== Track listing ==
No.	Title	Writer(s)	Length
1.	"Tayo'y Mga Pinoy" (We Are Filipinos) (Heber Bartolome cover)	Francis Magalona; Heber Bartolome; Jimmy Antiporda	4:25
2.	"Man from Manila"	Magalona; Antiporda; John Porter	3:54
3.	"Halalan" (Election)	Magalona; Noel Macanaya; Joey Ayala	3:40
4.	"Our House" (Madness cover)	Chris Foreman; Mike Barson; Lee Thompson; Graham McPherson; Dan Woodgate; Mark Bedford	5:03
5.	"Mga Praning" (Junkies)	Magalona; Macanaya; Carlo Sison	7:21
6.	"Wack"	Magalona; Macanaya	3:57
7.	"Hangga't Yakap" (As Long as You Can Embrace Me)	Magalona; Luis Gonzales; Alvin Nuñez	5:15
8.	"Biktima ng Karahasan" (Victim of Violence)	Magalona; Maganaya; Sison; Ferniel Miranda	4:22
9.	"Touch"	Magalona; Nuñez	5:10
10.	"Yo! To Yahweh"	Magalona; Macanaya; Niño Ricardo Mesina	4:20

CD bonus tracks
No.	Title	Writer(s)	Length
11.	"Man from Manila" (extended version)	Magalona; Antiporda; Porter	5:36
12.	"Our House" (extended version)	Foreman; Barson; Thompson; McPherson; Woodgate; Bedford	4:58
13.	"Estribo" (Stirrup)	Magalona	3:54
Total length:			61:56
