= Hindi Ka na Mag-iisa =

2012 Philippine television drama series

- Title card
- Also known as: Never Be Alone
- Genre: Romantic drama
- Developed by: Dode Cruz
- Written by: Lobert Villela; Luningning Ribay; Angeli Delgado
- Directed by: Gil Tejada Jr.
- Creative director: Jun Lana
- Starring: Jennylyn Mercado; Sid Lucero
- Theme music composer: Arnie Mendaros
- Opening theme: "Hindi Ka na Mag-iisa" by Jennylyn Mercado
- Country of origin: Philippines
- Original language: Tagalog
- No. of episodes: 80

Production
- Executive producer: Kaye Atienza-Cadsawan
- Production locations: Metro Manila, Philippines
- Cinematography: Lito Mempin
- Camera setup: Multiple-camera setup
- Running time: 30–45 minutes
- Production company: GMA Entertainment TV

Original release
- Network: GMA Network
- Release: July 9 – October 26, 2012

Hindi Ka na Mag-iisa (transl. you will never be alone / international title: Never Be Alone) is a 2012 Philippine television drama romance series broadcast by GMA Network. Directed by Gil Tejada Jr., it stars Jennylyn Mercado and Sid Lucero. It premiered on July 9, 2012 on the network's Afternoon Prime line up. The series concluded on October 26, 2012, with a total of 80 episodes.

The series is streaming online on YouTube.

== Cast and characters ==
Cast

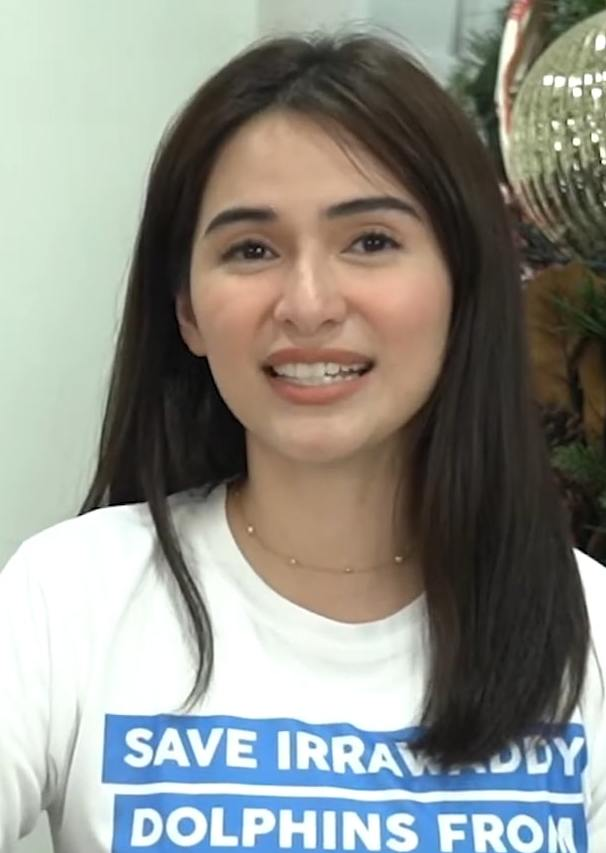
Jennylyn Mercado

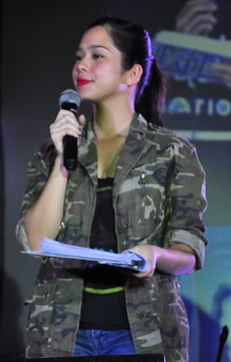
Saab Magalona

Lead cast

- Jennylyn Mercado as Elisa Santos
- Sid Lucero as Andrew Villagracia

Supporting cast

- Krystal Reyes as Angelica Montenegro
- Frank Magalona as Mark Calderon
- Angelu de Leon as Jordana Montenegro
- Glydel Mercado as Maita Montenegro
- Lloyd Samartino as Bernard Montenegro
- Liza Lorena as Asuncion Montenegro
- Carl Guevarra as Dennis
- Mosang as Betty
- Joey Paras as Mimi
- Saab Magalona as Celine Montenegro

Recurring cast

- Ces Quesada as Gina
- Johnny Revilla as Mesandro Villagracia
- Maybelyn dela Cruz as Sofia
- Jhett Romero as Ben
- Kryshee Grengia as young Elisa
- Gino dela Peña as Greg
- Gillette Sandico as Mark's mother
- Mark Jerome Bautista as younger Andrew Villagracia

== Ratings ==
According to AGB Nielsen Philippines' Mega Manila household television ratings, the pilot episode of Hindi Ka na Mag-iisa earned a 15.8% rating. The final episode scored a 22.9% rating.
