= Frank Magalona =

Filipino actor and rapper (born 1987)

- Born: Francis Michael Arroyo Magalona Jr. December 19, 1987 (age 38)
- Occupations: Actor, rapper
- Years active: 2011–present
- Parents: Francis Magalona (father); Pia Arroyo (mother)
- Relatives: Enrique Magalona (great-grandfather); Pancho Magalona (grandfather); Tita Duran (grandmother); Maxene Magalona (sister); Saab Magalona (sister); Elmo Magalona (brother); Hiro Peralta (cousin)
- Musical career
- Genre: Pop

Francis Michael Arroyo Magalona Jr., better known as Frank Magalona, is a Filipino actor and rapper.

== Biography ==
He was born December 19, 1987, in Manila, Philippines. He is the son of rapper Francis Magalona and Pia Arroyo-Magalona. He is also the grandson of Pancho Magalona and Tita Duran. He has five sibling including actors Maxene Magalona, Saab Magalona, and Elmo Magalona.

== Filmography ==
=== Television ===
Year	Title	Role
2011	Party Pilipinas	Performer (2011/2013)
2011	Elena M. Patron's Blusang Itim	Angelo Soriano
2011	Kung Aagawin Mo ang Langit	Atty. Enrico Fernandez
2012	Spooky Valentine	Jonas
2012	My Beloved	Ronald
2012	Hindi Ka na Mag-iisa	Mark Calderon
2012	ASAP	Guest Performer
2013	Mundo Mo'y Akin	Anthony Borja
2014	Rhodora X	Santi Vasquez
2014	Yagit	Bruce Guison
2015	Once Upon a Kiss	Hans Peligro
2015	Marimar	Franco
2016	Hanggang Makita Kang Muli	Bernard
2017	Follow Your Heart	Himself/Contestant

== Discography ==
Year	Title	Role	Company
2012	Inuman Sessions Volume 2	Collaborated with Parokya ni Edgar on behalf of his late father Francis Magalona	Universal Records
2013	Bente	Collaborated with Parokya ni Edgar and Gloc-9	Universal Records
2016	Pogi Years Old		Universal Records
