= Mga Basang Sisiw =

2013 Philippine television drama series

- Title card
- Also known as: Lost Children
- Genre: Drama
- Based on: Mga Basang Sisiw (1981)
- Developed by: Dode Cruz
- Written by: Luningning Interio-Ribay; Christine Novicio
- Directed by: Ricky Davao
- Creative director: Jun Lana
- Starring: Renz Valerio; Bianca Umali; Kimberly Faye; Hershey Garcia; Miko Zarsadias
- Theme music composer: Nonong Buencamino
- Opening theme: "Natutulog Ba ang Diyos?" by Roseanne Magan
- Country of origin: Philippines
- Original language: Tagalog
- No. of episodes: 110

Production
- Executive producer: Kaye Atienza-Cadsawan
- Production locations: Quezon City, Philippines
- Cinematography: Chiqui Soriano
- Camera setup: Multiple-camera setup
- Running time: 20–28 minutes
- Production company: GMA Entertainment TV

Original release
- Network: GMA Network
- Release: June 3 – November 1, 2013

Mga Basang Sisiw (transl. wet chicks / international title: Lost Children) is a 2013 Philippine television drama series broadcast by GMA Network. The series is based on a 1981 Philippine film of the same title. Directed by Ricky Davao, it stars Renz Valerio, Bianca Umali, Kimberly Faye, Hershey Garcia and Miko Zarsadias. It premiered on June 3, 2013, on the network's Afternoon Prime line up. The series concluded on November 1, 2013, with a total of 110 episodes.

The series is streaming online on YouTube.

== Premise ==
The series chronicles the story of five siblings – Justin, Faye, Shine, Cha and Mickey – and their long and painful journey to rebuild their once happy family.

== Cast and characters ==
Cast

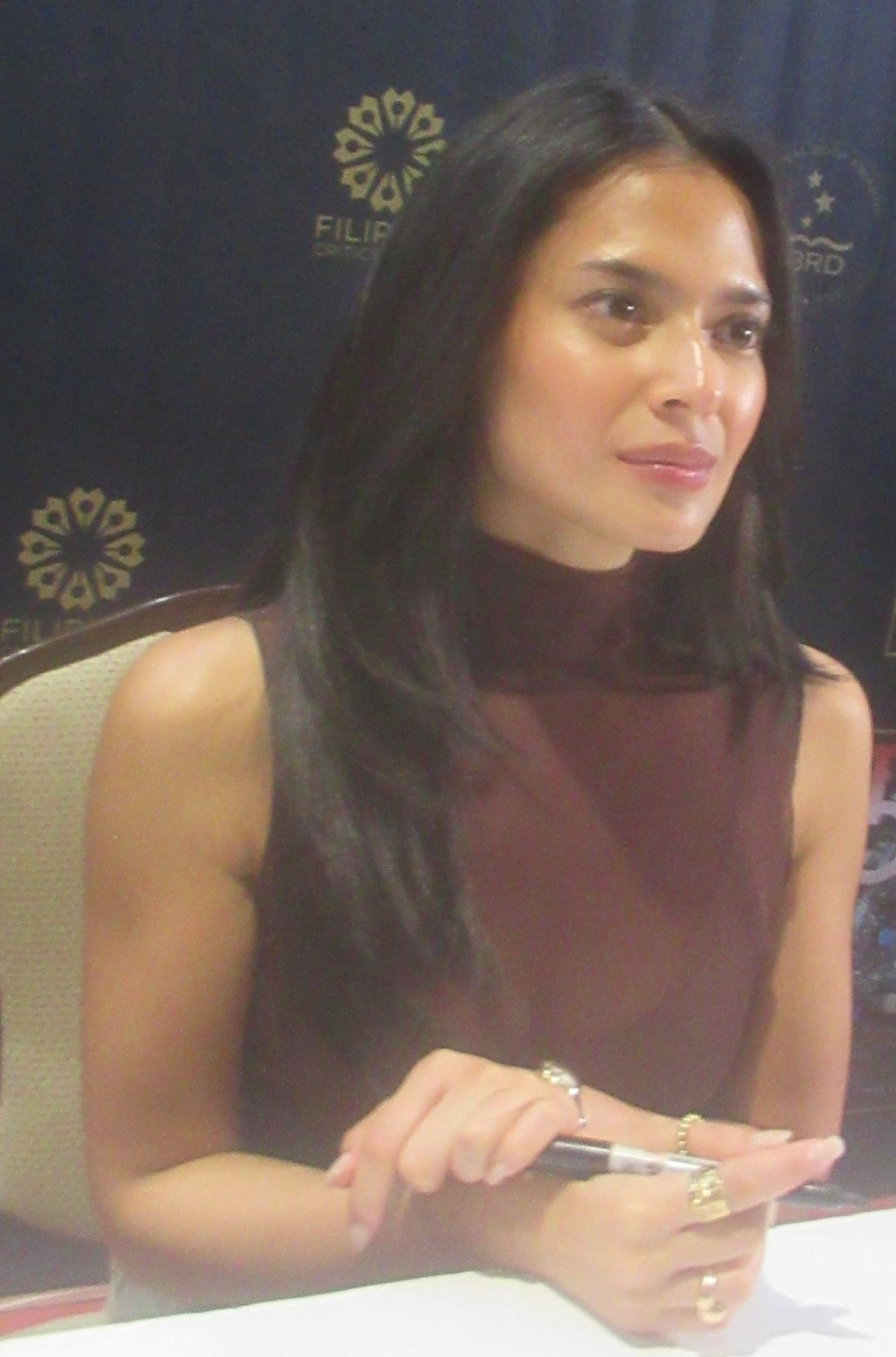
Bianca Umali

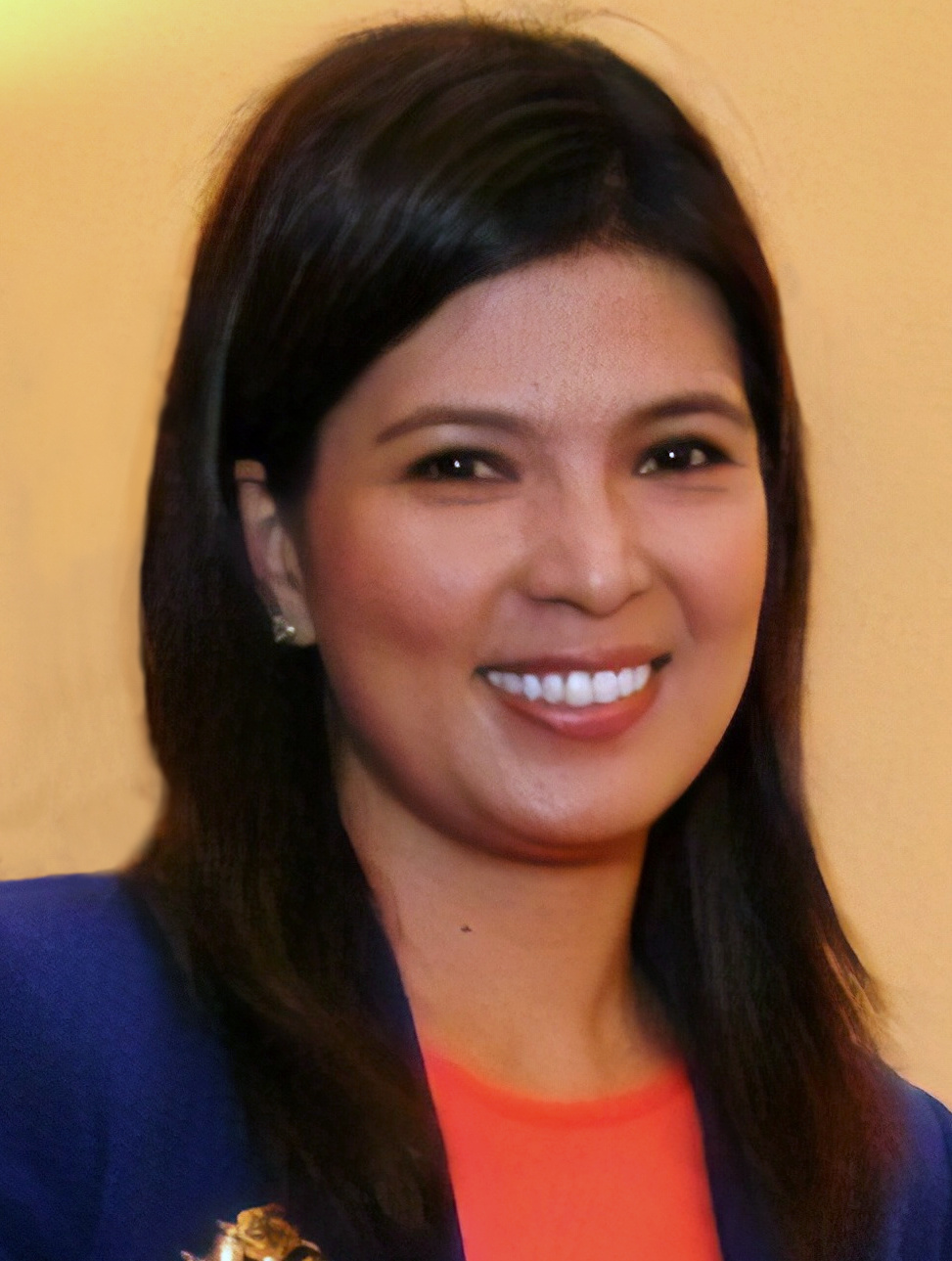
Lani Mercado

Lead cast

- Renz Valerio as Justin Santos
- Bianca Umali as Feline "Faye" Santos
- Kimberly Faye Fulgar as Sunshine "Shine" Santos
- Hershey Garcia as Charity "Cha" Santos
- Miko Zarsadias as Michael "Mickey" Santos

Supporting cast

- Raymond Bagatsing as Froilan Santos
- Lani Mercado as Olivia Santos
- Maxene Magalona as Victoria "Vicky" Santa Maria
- Gardo Versoza as Efren Rodrigo
- Mike Tan as Gregorio "Rigor" Manalastas
- Caridad Sanchez as Lagring
- Maricris Garcia as Cecilia "Cecile" Reyes

Guest cast

- Jaya as Sally
- Joko Diaz as Tony
- Miguel Tanfelix as Chester

== Development ==
The television series is an adaptation of Agustin dela Cruz's film Mga Basang Sisiw. Produced and released by BSH Films in 1981, the film stars Julie Vega, Janice de Belen, Cheche Perez de Tagle, Sheryl Cruz, Niño Muhlach and Helen Vela.

In April 2013, GMA Network announced that they would adapt Mga Basang Sisiw into a soap opera, posing the theme: "No matter how bad life seems, someone always shares and understands one's confinement in such a desperate state." Head writer Richard Cruz enhanced the original plot by adding twists, subplots and additional characters. The series was executive produced by Kaye Atienza-Cadsawan and directed by Ricky Davao. The creative team was composed of Afternoon Prime Head, Roy Iglesias; Creative Consultant, Kit Villanueva Langit; Program Manager, Hazel F. Abonita; Headwriter, Richard Dode Cruz; writers, Luningning Ribay and Christine Novicio; and Brainstormers, Gilda Olvidado and Liberty Trinidad.

=== Casting ===
The series features eleven regular speaking roles. The majority of the ensemble cast was assembled in March and April 2013. Lani Mercado and Raymond Bagatsing were the first two actors to be chosen. The role of Vicky Santa Maria was originally offered to LJ Reyes who declined, so it was given to Maxene Magalona – her first "anti-hero" role. Magalona described her role as "super villain" and further stated "later in the series, it will be shown why my character is behaving that way, cold and cruel. [...] people will also sympathize with my character when they understand why she's acting that way." Gardo Versoza, veteran actress Caridad Sanchez and Mike Tan were the last actors to be cast. Tan described his role Rigor Manalastas as a "grey" character and "you either love him or hate him."

== Ratings ==
According to AGB Nielsen Philippines' Mega Manila household television ratings, the pilot episode of Mga Basang Sisiw earned a 13.5% rating. The final episode scored a 15.3% rating.

== Accolades ==
Accolades received by Mga Basang Sisiw
Year	Award	Category	Recipient	Result	Ref.
2013	27th PMPC Star Awards for Television	Best Daytime Drama Series	Mga Basang Sisiw	Nominated	
2014	Golden Screen TV Awards	Outstanding Adapted Drama Program	Mga Basang Sisiw	Nominated	
