= The Oddventures of Mr. Cool =

Studio album by Francis M.
- Released: 1998
- Recorded: 1997
- Genre: Pinoy hip hop
- Label: Greater East Asia Music; BMG Records (Pilipinas), Inc.

Francis M. chronology
OPM Timeless Collection Gold Series 2 (1997)	The Oddventures of Mr. Cool (1998)	Interscholastic (1999)

Singles from The Oddventures of Mr. Cool
- 1. "Whole Lotta Lovin'" Released: 1998; 2. "Friends" Released: 1998

Professional ratings
Review scores
Source	Rating
Allmusic	4/5 stars

The Oddventures of Mr. Cool is the seventh studio album of Filipino rapper artist Francis M., released in 1998. The album contains more of a mellow, urban-style kind of music which is reminiscent of his debut album Yo!. Several songs on The Oddventures of Mr. Cool are sampled from foreign artists, including Whodini's "Friends", as heard on "Friends".

== Track listing ==
No.	Title	Writer(s)	Length
1.	"Wake Up Call"	Francis Magalona	1:55
2.	"Friends"	Dave Grusin/Jalil Hutchins/Jeffrey Baylor Williams	4:30
3.	"Can I Have a Kiss?"	Francis Magalona	3:31
4.	"Headphones"	Angee Rozul	0:57
5.	"Whole Lotta Lovin' (Radio Edit) [featuring Evil Srepsisters]"	Francis Magalona, Pia Arroyo, Marvin Querido	4:19
6.	"Peace on Earth (featuring Babsie Molina)"	Francis Magalona	4:31
7.	"Old Skool"	Scharod Jackson/Nate Johnson	5:20
8.	"What U Want"	Francis Magalona	4:14
9.	"Glass of Milk"	Angee Rozul	3:12
10.	"Tomagotchi"	Angee Rozul	1:09
11.	"Put Ya Hands Up"	Francis Magalona	4:00
12.	"Manchild"	Arnold Buena	4:39
13.	"23 Seconder"	Angee Rozul	0:23
14.	"Loophole"	Raimund Marasigan	4:56
15.	"Coolness"	Jimmy Antiporda	3:45
16.	"Whole Lotta Lovin'" [Remix] (featuring Evil Stepsisters)"	Francis Magalona, Pia Arroyo, Marvin Querido	5:21
17.	"Old Skool [The Toyroom Remix]"	Scharod Jackson/Nate Johnson	5:02

== Trivia ==
The track "Whole Lotta Lovin'" has a music video. Much of its music samples the intro of "Alapaap", a song performed by the Eraserheads, & its bridge part samples Madonna's 'Everybody' lines '(Dance & sing yeah, up and do the thing)'.

== Credits ==
- Executive Producer: Rudy Y. Tee
- A & R Executive: Vic Valenciano & Romel Sanchez
- A & R Coordinator: Diego Castillo
- Design Lay Out: Mark Aquino & John Joel Lopez
