= Saab Magalona =

Filipina actress (born 1988)

Saab Magalona-Bacarro
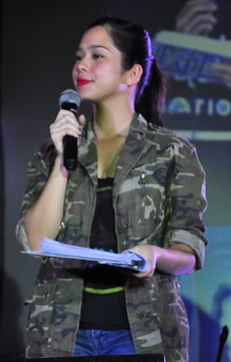
- Magalona at the Rock For a Fully Abled Nation benefit concert in the Eastwood City, Manila, 2013
- Born: Maria Isabella Simone Arroyo Magalona; November 23, 1988 (age 37); Manila, Philippines
- Occupations: Host; singer; actress; blogger
- Years active: 2007–present
- Spouse: Jim Bacarro (m. 2015)
- Children: 3
- Family: Enrique Magalona (great grandfather); Pancho Magalona (grandfather); Tita Duran (grandmother); Francis Magalona (father); Maxene Magalona (sister); Frank Magalona (brother); Elmo Magalona (brother); Hiro Peralta (cousin)
- Musical career
- Genres: Indie rock; Alternative rock

Maria Isabella Simone Arroyo Magalona-Bacarro (born November 23, 1988), better known as Saab Magalona, is a Filipino actress, singer and podcaster who started in the TV5 youth-oriented drama series Lipgloss. She is the daughter of Francis Magalona and sister of Maxene Magalona, Frank Magalona & Elmo Magalona. In music, she is a member of the 8-piece indie rock band Cheats, where she acts as co-lead vocalist, alongside Candy Gamos and her husband, Jim Bacarro.

== Early life and education ==
Magalona was born on November 23, 1988, to rapper and actor Francis Magalona and Pia Magalona. Her grandparents are actors Pancho Magalona and Tita Duran, while her great-grandfather was former senator Enrique Magalona. She has five siblings, including actors Maxene, Frank, Elmo, and Arkin. She took up creative writing at the Ateneo de Manila University and graduated in 2009.

== Career ==
In 2007, she made her first onscreen appearance as the friend of Eleanor (played by Alessandra de Rossi) in the GMA Network telefantasya Kamandag where her sister Maxene played the role of one of Richard Gutierrez' leading ladies. In 2008, she joined the cast of TV5's Lipgloss. In October 2010, she made her GMA comeback on the teleserye Koreana, playing Ivy.

Her music career began when she filled-in for several indie bands such as Us-2 Evil-0 (2009), Duster, and BBYGRL (2012). A few years later, she and Jim Bacarro formed the band called Cheats following the disbandment of Bacarro's band Ernville.

In 2018, she returned to television and signed up with ABS-CBN as the new host of music program Coke Studio Homecoming.

== Personal life ==
On January 24, 2015, she married her boyfriend and fellow Cheats band member, Jim Bacarro, in a private ceremony that was held in St. Ignatius Chapel inside the Philippine Military Academy in Baguio.

In September 2017, Magalona announced that she and Bacarro were expecting twins. Later on, she suffered a miscarriage and lost her daughter, while her son narrowly survived childbirth.

In 2018, Magalona and Bacarro launched the podcast Wake Up with Jim and Saab. The podcast has generated ₱3,000,000 in content subscriptions as of 2023, with all proceeds being donated to families of children with disabilities.

In September 2019, Magalona gave birth to another son.

Magalona also runs an ADHD coaching program called Chaos Control Club.

== Filmography ==
=== Television ===
Year	Title	Role
2007–2008	Kamandag	Ria Ramos
2008–2009	Lipgloss	Meg Madrigal
2010–2011	Koreana	Ivy Jung
2011	Captain Barbell	Kristel
2012	My Beloved	Ginella Quijano
2012	Hindi Ka na Mag-iisa	Celine Montenegro
2013	Forever	Leila
2013–2014	Adarna	Robin Abrientos
2016	ASAP	Host/Performer
2018	Coke Studio Homecoming	Host

== Music career ==
Albums with Cheats

- Cheats (2016)
