= Perfecto de Castro =

Filipino musician

Perf de Castro
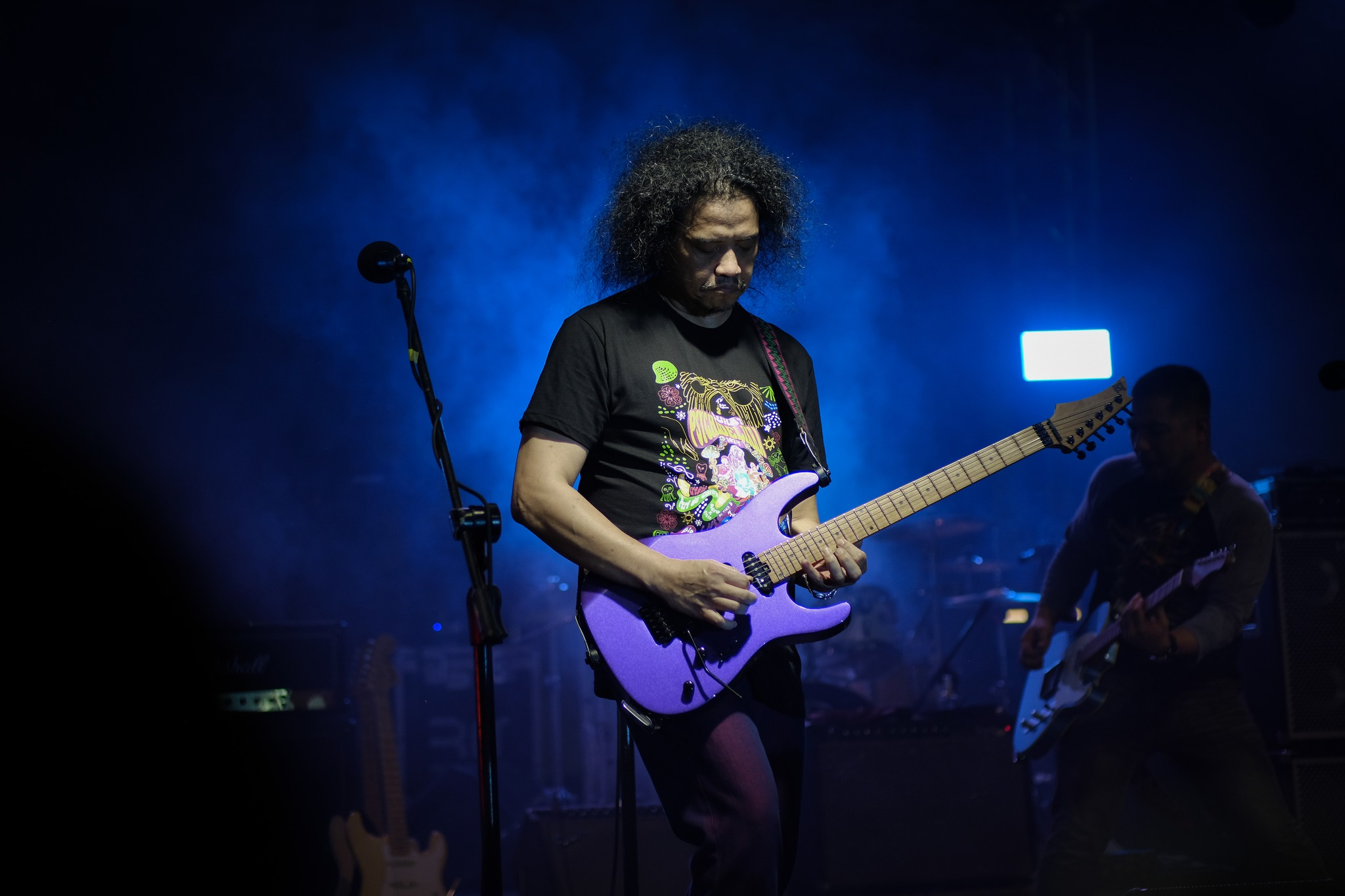
- Perf de Castro performing in 2024.

Background information
- Also known as: Perf de Castro
- Born: Perfecto de Castro IV; August 15, 1974 (age 51)
- Genres: Pinoy rock (OPM); classical; hard rock; alternative rock; pop
- Instruments: Guitar; vocals
- Years active: 1994–present
- Website: Official website

YouTube information
- Channel: Perfecto De Castro
- Years active: 2006–present
- Genres: Music; tutorials; interviews; vlog
- Subscribers: 356 thousand
- Views: 30.1 million
- Last updated: August 4, 2026

Perfecto "Perf" de Castro (born August 15, 1974) is a Filipino musician currently based in Los Angeles, California best known for having been a celebrated fixture in the Philippine alternative rock scene during the 1990s. During the course of that decade, he was one of the original members of the alternative rock band Rivermaya, founded the band Triaxis, and also collaborated with the seminal Filipino rapper Francis Magalona and Filipino hard rock band Wolfgang, all of which received critical and commercial acclaim. Hailed as one of the best guitarists in the Philippines by fans and critics alike, de Castro is also known for being adept at classical and flamenco music played on the ten-string guitar.

== Life and career ==
De Castro was born in Cabadbaran, Agusan del Norte, to a Batangueño father and a mother from Agusan. He started learning classical guitar at 13 but switched to electric guitar after less than a year and spent the next decade learning, playing, and teaching electric guitar. He was introduced to the ten-string classical guitar by musician Jose Valdez in 1998 and has since then concentrated on this instrument. He uses a unique tuning adapted from the Valdez tuning.

His most notable awards as a musician include the 1998 Katha Award for Best Rock Instrumental Performance and Composition and the 1998 NU Rock Award for Guitarist of the Year. He is also widely recognized as an acclaimed album producer and sound engineer, with his works including the multi-platinum albums of Wolfgang (Semenelin), Francis M (FreeMan and FreeMan II), and Marc Velasco (eponymous). From these, he received numerous accolades, including the Producer of the Year Award in the 1998 NU 107 Rock Awards and the 2001 Awit Award for Best Rap Recording for a song done in collaboration with Magalona.

In 2004, de Castro relocated to Los Angeles, CA, where he continues to record, perform and teach the guitar through his website and social media. He also formed a band name RockStallion, with members David Aguirre, Wolf Gemora, Mark Yap, and Raffy Mendoza.

In 2006, de Castro produced a benefit album called Leyte: The Benefit CD. It is a compilation of songs from Filipino and Filipino-American artists aimed at helping the victims of the 2006 Southern Leyte mudslide and the proceeds went to relief organizations in the Philippines, such as the Philippine National Red Cross and the Department of Social Welfare and Development, to fund their relief efforts to the people affected by the Leyte mudslide disaster.

On January 9, 2016, de Castro reunited with his former Rivermaya co-members, Nathan Azarcon, Mark Escueta and Rico Blanco for a "surprise mini semi-reunion", following his gig at 19 East, Taguig.

On September 7, 2018, de Castro performed in the launching of the Hollywood Wish Bus at Universal CityWalk with Introvoys and Robin Nievera, the DJ for The Roadshow program of Wish 107.5.

In February 2021, de Castro collaborated with Gloc-9 on the song "Payong".

== Awards ==
- 1998 NU 107 Rock Awards Guitarist of the Year (won)
- 1998 NU 107 Rock Awards Producer of the Year (nominated)
- 1998 Katha Award for Best Instrumental Performance and Arrangement for “Perf’s Boogie”, Triaxis
- January 1999 Artist of the Month, VirtualTunes.com
- 3rd place 1999 NAMCYA Classical Guitar Category C
- January 2000 Artist of the Month, Musiko.com
- 2001 Awit Award for Best Rap Recording, “Luv 4 Lyf”, Francis M artist and co-producer.

== Discography ==
as a performer

- 1994 RiverMaya, Rivermaya, BMG Pilipinas
- 1995 FreeMan, Francis M., BMG Pilipinas (guest artist)
- 1995 Semenelin, Wolfgang, Epic / Sony Music (guest artist)
- 1996 Further Down the Bend, Triaxis, Epic/Sony Music
- 1997 The Shadowland Deep, Backdraft, NEO/Viva Records (guest artist)
- 1998 Who We Are, Triaxis, Epic / Sony Music
- 1999 Marc Velasco, Marc Velasco, Epic/Sony Music (guest artist)
- 2000 Nescafe Open Up Party, various artists/Mike Hanopol, Mike Hanopol, BMG Pilipinas (guest artist)
- 2000 FreeMan 2, Francis M, BMG Pilipinas (guest artist)
- 2001 Impressions, Nonoy Zuñiga, Columbia / Sony Music (guest artist)
- 2006 A Journey Through Ten Strings, Perfecto de Castro, Independent release
- 2006 Leyte: The Benefit Album, Independent release
- 2009 Caparison, Perfecto de Castro, Independent release
- 2021 Poot at Pag-ibig, Gloc-9, Independent release

as a producer

- 1994 RiverMaya, Rivermaya, BMG Pilipinas
- 1995 Semenelin, Wolfgang, Epic / Sony Music
- 1996 Further Down the Bend, Triaxis, Epic / Sony Music
- 1997 The Shadowland Deep, Backdraft, NEO/Viva Records
- 1998 Who We Are, Triaxis, Epic / Sony Music
- 1999 Marc Velasco, Marc Velasco, Epic / Sony Music
- 2000 FreeMan 2, Francis M., BMG Pilipinas
- 2001 Impressions, Nonoy Zuñiga, Columbia / Sony Music (guest artist)
- 2006 A Journey Through Ten Strings, Perfecto de Castro, Independent release
- 2006 Leyte: The Benefit Album, Independent release
- 2009 Caparison, Perfecto de Castro, Independent release
