= FreeMan =

Studio album by Francis M.
- Released: April 1995
- Recorded: 1994–1995
- Studios: Greenhills Sound Studios A, B, C & E
- Genres: Pinoy rap; Pinoy rock; rap metal
- Length: 60:27
- Languages: Filipino; English
- Labels: Musiko Records; BMG Records (Pilipinas), Inc.
- Producer: Francis Magalona

Francis M. chronology
Meron Akong Ano! (1993)	FreeMan (1995)	Happy Battle (1996)

Singles from FreeMan
- 1. "Kaleidoscope World" Released: 1995; 2. "Pikon" Released: 1996; 3. "Kabataan Para sa Kinabukasan" Released: 1996

Professional ratings
Review scores
Source	Rating
Allmusic	4.5/5 stars

FreeMan is the fourth album by Filipino rapper Francis M., released in 1995 by BMG Records (Pilipinas) Inc, Musiko Records. It was Magalona's first outing with the BMG label, having left his previous label, OctoArts International Inc., in 1994. Its release firmly established Magalona's legitimacy in the Pinoy rock scene. Tracks "Three Stars & A Sun", "Kabataan Para Sa Kinabukasan", and "Kaleidoscope World" would become defining touch-points in Magalona's body of work.

== Background ==
A track titled "Intellectual Property Rights" sampled a speech by then-president Fidel V. Ramos. Intellectual property rights was an issue that would continue to be an important and very personal advocacy for Magalona.

The iconic cover of the album featured an image of Magalona's son Elmo, aged six months. A version of "Kabataan Para Sa Kinabukasan" became the advertising theme for the Royal Tru-Orange soda drink brand, since a previous FrancisM song, "Ito ang gusto ko!" had already been used to promote that product. The song was also featured in Pare Ko, a 1995 Filipino movie which featured music from other Pinoy rock artists.

"Kaleidoscope World" went on to win 1996 Awit Award for Best Produced Record of the Year and Song of the Year at the 1996 NU Rock Awards. The song's music video was directed by the director/cinematographer Raymond Red, and showed Magalona, his band Hardware Syndrome, his backup singers "the Evil Stepsisters", and the respective children of Magalona and Red at that time. In January 1996, a next single, "Pikon" was released.

Throughout the rest of his career, Magalona would repeatedly refer to elements in FreeMan as a starting points for new endeavors. The motif and title of "Three Stars and a Sun" would become the defining mark of his fashion label, FrancisM Clothing Company. A later album, FreeMan 2, would repeat Freeman's themes with new music, and with the occasional retrospective examination of the influence of the first FreeMan album.

When Magalona died on March 6, 2009, "Kaleidoscope World" was played in many of the pay tributes to the artist, including an audio-visual has been paid presentation from Eat Bulaga!, the noontime variety program of which Magalona was a co-host, and a short rendering of the song first at the Eraserheads' "Final Set" reunion concert 2009, which the band dedicated to Magalona. The song was also played repeatedly during his wake and his burial.

== Accolades ==
Publication	Country	Accolade	Year	Rank
Esquire Magazine	Philippines	10 Essential OPM Albums of the 1990s	2019	*

* denotes an unordered list

== Track listing ==
All tracks are written by Francis Magalona, except where noted. All tracks are arranged by The Hardware Syndrome.

No.	Title	Writer(s)	Length
1.	"Baw-Waw-Waw"		3:08
2.	"Three Stars and a Sun"		4:55
3.	"Bahala na" (Come What May)	Juan Silos Jr.; Levi Celerio	1:35
4.	"Old Man"		2:54
5.	"Pikon" (Short-tempered)		5:49
6.	"Beam Me Up Scottie / Kimo's Groove"	J. Santos	2:05
7.	"Funky Monkey"	Magalona; Noel Mendez	3:05
8.	"Rasputin Lives"	Magalona; Santos	1:30
9.	"Jolog"	Magalona; Perfecto de Castro	3:15
10.	"Contrapelo" (Against the Grain)	Carlos Sison; Francis Villanueva; N. Aquino Jr.	2:25
11.	"Kabataan para sa Kinabukasan" (Youth for the Future)		3:28
12.	"Pen & Ink"		4:42
13.	"Suckin' on Helium / Kaleidoscope World"	Magalona; de Castro	4:53
14.	"Mahiwagang Kamote" (Mysterious Sweet Potato)		2:58
15.	"Puso ng Siga" (Heart of Fire)	Magalona; Mendez	3:21
16.	"Pektus"		3:17
17.	"Intellectual Property Rights"		0:25
18.	"Blood on the Mud / 2nd Man on the Moon"		4:26
19.	"Contrapelo 2"	Sison; Villanueva; Aquino	2:10
Total length:			60:27

== Personnel ==
Francis Magalona - vocals

The Hardware Syndrome Members:

- Boyet Aquino - drums & percussions
- Carlo Sison - guitar
- Francis Villanueva - bass
- DJ Kimozave - turntable & drum machine

Additional musicians:

- Evil Stepsisters - additional vocals
- Perfecto De Castro, Noel Mendez - additional guitars

== Album credits ==
- Executive Producer: Rudy Tee
- A & R: Vic Valenciano
- All Songs Are Mixed by Nikki Cunanan except "3 Stars & A Sun" and "Kabataan Para Sa Kinabukasan" Mixed By Jun Dela Paz; Contrapelo and Rasputin Lives Mixed by Herky Alonzo; Jolog By Rey Salac
- Recorded & Mixed at Greenhills Sound Studios A, B, C & E
- Photography By: Mitch "Super Mitch" Alvarado
- Cover Concept: Francis Magalona
- Art Direction: Mario Joson
- Design And Execution: Chitty Ramirez
