= Maxene Magalona =

Filipino actress (born 1986)

- Born: Maxene Sofia Maria Arroyo Magalona; November 23, 1986 (age 39); Bacolod, Philippines
- Education: Ateneo de Manila University (BA)
- Occupations: Actress; model; host; yoga instructor
- Years active: 1992–present
- Agents: Star Magic (1992–2000; 2014–present); GMA Artist Center (2000–2014)
- Spouse: Rob Mananquil (m. 2018; sep. 2022)
- Partner: Geoff Gonzalez (2023–present)
- Father: Francis Magalona
- Relatives: Saab Magalona (sister); Frank Magalona (brother); Elmo Magalona (brother); Pancho Magalona (grandfather); Tita Duran (grandmother); Enrique Magalona (great-grandfather); Hiro Peralta (cousin); Regine Velasquez (aunt)
- Website: maxene.ph

Maxene Sofia Maria Arroyo Magalona (born November 23, 1986) is a Filipino actress, model, host, and yoga instructor currently signed under ABS-CBN. A former talent of the GMA Artist Center, she was known for her portrayals of Donna Vallejo on Daddy Di Do Du (2001–2007) and Vivian Salvador on My Lover, My Wife (2011). After transferring to ABS-CBN, Magalona became known for her portrayal of Alex Acosta on Doble Kara (2015–2017).

== Early life ==
Maxene Sofia Maria Arroyo Magalona was born in Bacolod, Negros Occidental, Philippines to rapper Francis Magalona and Pia Arroyo-Magalona. Her grandparents are actors Pancho Magalona and Tita Duran, while her great-grandfather was former senator Enrique Magalona. She has five siblings, including actors Saab, Frank, Elmo, and Arkin. She graduated from the Ateneo de Manila University in 2010 with a Social Sciences degree.

== Career ==
=== Starting career on ABS-CBN ===
Her first show as a child was the ABS-CBN kiddie show Ang TV followed by 5 and Up.

=== GMA Network (1998–2014) ===
Then in 1998, she transferred to GMA Network. she made her first appearance in Munting Anghel in 2000. Then 2001 second appearance in Daddy Di Do Du in which she worked with Vic Sotto. In 2004, the role of Alwina in Mulawin was originally given to her, but she had to turn down the offer as she was about to start college at the time. It was later given to Angel Locsin. To date, her biggest break on television is when she was chosen to be one of Richard Gutierrez's leading ladies in major lead role Kamandag this is marks first primetime drama series on GMA Network. After Kamandag, Maxene played Jessa, originally played by Sharon Cuneta, in Sine Novela: Una Kang Naging Akin opposite Wendell Ramos and Angelika dela Cruz.

In 2009, Magalona joined the cast of SRO Cinemaserye: Ganti, opposite Marvin Agustin and Geoff Eigenmann. Maxene also starred on Sine Novela: Kung Aagawin Mo ang Lahat sa Akin with JC Tiuseco, Glaiza de Castro and Patrick Garcia.

In June 2010, she joined the cast of Sine Novela: Trudis Liit, with her co-stars Pauleen Luna, Mike Tan, Gina Alajar, and new Kapuso child actress Jillian Ward. Then in February 2011, she starred on GMA afternoon drama show, My Lover, My Wife opposite Adrian Alandy and Kapuso Actress Nadine Samonte.

In 2013, Magalona joined the GMA afternoon drama series Mga Basang Sisiw playing Vicky Sta. Maria, the main antagonist role and villain of the series, with the lead stars Renz Valerio, Bianca Umali and Miko Zarsadias.

=== Return to ABS-CBN (2014–present) ===
In the 3rd quarter of 2014, she signed an exclusive contract and returned to her home network after 16 years, ABS-CBN. and since then had a guest stint as one of the Hurado's on It's Showtime; as a guest player in The Singing Bee; as a special guest in Kris TV; and starred in Maalaala Mo Kaya (Episode title: Nurse Cap), portraying the nurse rapper, Fatima Palma. Magalona's first major project as a Kapamilya Artist is being part of ABS-CBN's Primetime Soap Dream Dad together with Jana Casandra Agoncillo and Zanjoe Marudo.

In the first quarter of 2015, Magalona was one of the eight contestants of the first season of the Philippine edition of Your Face Sounds Familiar.

In November 2015, after 2 months of the pilot, Magalona joined the cast of Doble Kara as Alexandra "Alex" Acosta in season 2. She's a sweet and kind-hearted to the kids where she worked and she was raised by her older half-brother Sebastian "Seb" Acosta portrayed by Sam Milby. She met Kara Dela Rosa portrayed by Julia Montes (which Seb married Kara in season 4). At first, she likes Kara for her brother and keeps asking her brother to take Kara out. But, when she finds out that Kara's adopted mother Lucille Acosta-Dela Rosa portrayed by Carmina Villarroel was her half-sister from her father's side, the sweet and kind-hearted lady became evil to Kara and her family because she believes that Lucille's family is the reason why she grew without parents. Later on, she became the main antagonist of the series in season 4.

== Personal life ==
In 2015, Magalona began dating musician Rob Mananquil. On February 14, 2017 (Valentine's Day), the two became engaged when the latter proposed to the former while vacationing in Tokyo. Magalona and Mananquil married on January 11, 2018, at a ceremony in Boracay. The two briefly lived in the town of Ubud in Bali, Indonesia, where they underwent yoga teacher training. In October 2022, Magalona announced via her Instagram post that she and Mananquil are separated. Magalona is currently in relationship with Geoff Gonzalez, who is a DJ and videographer; their relationship was first hinted in 2023 until her confirmation in mid-2025.

== Filmography ==
=== Film ===
Year	Title	Role
2001	Bahay ni Lola	Tintin
2002	Singsing ni Lola	Vik
2002	Mano Po	Young Elisa
2004	Kuya	Grace
2005	Happily Ever After	Laura
2016	Love Me Tomorrow	Jessica
2017	Unexpectedly Yours	Georgina
2018	The Girl in the Orange Dress	Martha
2019	Eerie	Sister Mia
2021	Love or Money	Pregnant Girlfriend

=== Television ===
==== Drama series ====
Year	Title	Role
2000	Munting Anghel	Jonnah
2004	Hanggang Kailan	Angela Villarama
2005	Saang Sulok ng Langit	Gemma
2007–2008	Carlo J. Caparas' Kamandag	Lily
2008	Sine Novela: Una Kang Naging Akin	Jessa Mallari
2009	Sine Novela: Kung Aagawin Mo ang Lahat sa Akin	Maureen Andrada / Dahlia Del Monte
2009–2010	Sana Ngayong Pasko	Irene Dionisio
2010	Sine Novela: Trudis Liit	Mercedes "Ched" Cristobal
2011	My Lover, My Wife	Vivian Torres-Delgado
2011	Mars Ravelo's Captain Barbell	Dalisay
2011	Pahiram ng Isang Ina	Andrea Martinez-Perez
2012	Faithfully	Stella Quillamor
2013	Indio	Rosa Delos Santos
2013	Mga Basang Sisiw	Victoria "Vicky" Santa Maria
2014–2015	Dream Dad	April Mae Pamintuan
2015	Nathaniel	Olivia Domingo
2015–2017	Doble Kara	Alexandra "Alex" Acosta
2017	Ipaglaban Mo: Suspetsa	Beth
2017	Ipaglaban Mo: Tali	Faith
2018–2019	Playhouse	Natalia Cortes-Smith
2019	Ipaglaban Mo: Nanay	Lenny
2020	Ipaglaban Mo: Himlayan	Denise
2021–2022	Viral Scandal	Audrey Versoza-Ramones

==== Drama anthology ====
Year	Title	Role
2003	Love to Love Season 1: Rich in Love	Trina
2009	SRO Cinemaserye: Ganti	Eloisa Barrientos
2009	Maynila	Various
2012	Magpakailanman: The Maricel Apatan Story	Maricel Apatan
2014	Maalaala Mo Kaya: Nurse Cap	Nurse Fatima Palma
2015	Maalaala Mo Kaya: Box	Tess Alparce-Dado

==== Comedy ====
Year	Title	Role
1995–1997	Ang TV	Herself
2001–2007	Daddy Di Do Du	Donna Vallejo
2012	Spooky Valentine Presents: Manibela	Jellie
2012	Pepito Manaloto: Ang Tunay na Kwento	Angie
2015	Sabado Badoo	Cameo Footage Featured

==== Others ====
Year	Title	Role
1998	5 and Up	Herself
2000	Y2K: Yes 2 Kids	Herself
2004–2010	SOP Rules	Herself / Performer
2005	Fam Jam	Host
2005	ASAP Fanatic	Guest / Performer
2010–2013	Party Pilipinas	Guest / Performer
2010	Tweetbiz	Host
2012	Protégé: The Battle for the Big Artista Break	Webi-Jock / Co-host
2012	iBilib	Herself
2013	The Ryzza Mae Show	Herself
2013	Convergence	Interview
2014	It's Showtime	Herself / Special Guest Hurado
2014	The Singing Bee	Herself Guest Player
2014	Kris TV	Herself Special Guest
2015	ASAP	Herself Performer / Co-host
2015	Your Face Sounds Familiar 1	Herself Performer / Pop Icon
2015	Kapamilya, Deal or No Deal (season 5)	Herself Contestant with Edgar Allan Guzman
2015	LolaBasyang.com	Rosa / Rosamistika
2016	Magandang Buhay	Herself / Guest
2017	The Source with Pinky Webb	Herself / Guest
2024–2025	It's Showtime	Herself / Guest

== Awards and nominations ==
Year	Critics	Category	Work	Award
2004	FHM Philippines	100 Sexiest Women		Ranked #23
2005	FHM Philippines	100 Sexiest Women		Ranked #79
2008	FHM Philippines	100 Sexiest Women		Ranked #48
2009	Pure 'N Fresh Top Teen Awards	Top Teen ‘IT’ Girl: Pure 'N Fresh Role Model		Nominated
2009	FHM Philippines	100 Sexiest Women		Ranked #82
2013	61st FAMAS Awards	Celebrity Skin of the Night	—N/a	Won
2013	27th PMPC Star Awards for Television	Best Reality Competition Program Host	Protege: The Battle For The Big Artista Break	Nominated
