= Pancho Magalona =

Filipino actor (1922–1998)

- Born: Enrique Gayoso Magalona Jr. January 22, 1922; Bacolod, Negros Occidental, Philippine Islands
- Died: April 7, 1998 (aged 76); Quezon City, Philippines
- Resting place: Loyola Memorial Park, Sucat, Parañaque, Philippines
- Citizenship: Philippine
- Occupation: Actor
- Years active: 1947–1985
- Spouse: Tita Duran (m. 1948; died 1990)
- Children: 9 (inc. Francis Magalona)
- Parents: Enrique B. Magalona (father); Consuelo Gayoso (mother)
- Relatives: Susana Magalona-Elizalde (sister); Betty Magalona-Gomez (sister); Maxene Magalona (granddaughter); Saab Magalona (granddaughter); Elmo Magalona (grandson); Frank Magalona (grandson); Hiro Peralta (grandnephew)

Pancho Magalona (born Enrique Gayoso Magalona Jr.; January 22, 1922 – April 7, 1998), was a Filipino actor from the 1940s to the 1970s.

== Early life ==
Enrique Gayoso Magalona Jr. was born January 22, 1922 in Bacolod, Negros Occidental, he was the son of Enrique B. Magalona Sr., a politician who served as municipal president of Saravia (now renamed in his honor) in Negros Occidental and as senator from 1946 to 1955.

== Career ==
Magalona and his wife Tita Duran, appeared in numerous Sampaguita Pictures films. The couple was the most popular love team in films during the late 1940s and 1950s. He was the father of Francis Magalona (1964–2009), Ma. Susan Magalona-Contreras, Vicky, Victor (married to Ma. Angeles), Henry, Popeye "Pye", Malot, Maricar Magalona-Martinez, and Martin. He also co-starred in a few Hollywood film that were shot in the Philippines, such as Merrill's Marauders (1962) and The Hook (1963). One of his best remembered roles is portraying the character of Simoun / Crisostomo Ibarra in the 1962 film adaptation of José Rizal's novel El Filibusterismo.

In 1967, Magalona ran for governor of Rizal under the Liberal Party but was defeated by incumbent governor Isidro Rodriguez; Neptali Gonzales, Magalona's running mate, managed to be elected vice governor.

== Awards ==
In 1959, Magalona won the FAMAS Award for Best Actor for his performance as a bandit in the 1958 film Hanggang sa Dulo ng Daigdig (lit. 'To the world's edge'), produced by the independent studio Pacific Movie Productions.

Year	Award-giving body	Category	Work	Result	Ref.
1959	7th FAMAS Awards	Best Actor	Hanggang sa Dulo ng Daigdig	Won	
1960	8th FAMAS Awards	Best Actor	Cry Freedom	Nominated	
1963	11th FAMAS Awards	Best Actor	El Filibusterismo	Nominated	
1992	6th PMPC Star Awards for Television	Vic Silayan Memorial Award		Recognized	
1996	19th Gawad Urian Awards	Lifetime Achievement Award		Recognized	

== Death ==
A heavy smoker, he suffered from emphysema and died at the Lung Center of the Philippines on April 7, 1998. He was buried in Loyola Memorial Park, Sucat, Parañaque beside his wife Tita Duran.

== Filmography ==
- Makislap Na Bato (1947)
- Maharlika (1948)
- Bulaklak Na Walang Pangalan (1948)
- Tatlong Puso (1948)
- Simpatika (1949)
- Ang Doktora (1949)
- Always Kay Ganda Mo (1949)
- Apoy sa Langit (1949)
- Milagro ng Birhen ng Mga Rosas (1949)
- Huwag Ka ng Magtampo (1950)
- Mapuputing Kamay (1950)
- Huling Patak ng Dugo (1950)
- Campo O' Donnell (1950)
- Umaga na, Giliw (1950)
- Kay Ganda Mo Neneng (1950)
- Umaga ng Neneng (1950)
- Kasintahan sa Pangarap (1951)
- Barbaro (1952)
- Lihim ng Kumpisalan (1952)
- Buhay Pilipino (1952)
- Basahang Ginto (1952) - Danny
- Kasaysayan ni Rudy Concepcion (1952) - Rudy Concepcion
- Teksas, ang Manok Na Nagsasalita (1952, English title: Texas)
- Sabas, ang Barbaro (1952)
- Musikong Bumbong (1953)
- Sa Isang Sulyap Mo Tita (1953) - Tony
- Maldita (1953)
- Vod-a-vil (1953)
- Ang Ating Pag-ibig (1953)
- Milyonarya at Hampaslupa (1954)
- Sa Isang Halik Mo Pancho (1954) - Pancho
- Menor de Edad (1954)
- Bulaklak sa Parang (1955)
- Sa Dulo ng Landas (1955)
- Waldas (1955)
- Maria Went to Town (1955)
- Lola Sinderella (1955)
- Apat Na Kasaysayang Ginto (1956) - First segment -"Ngayon at Kailan Man"
- Margarita (1956)
- Bella Filipina (1956)
- The Treasure of Gen. Yamashita (1956)
- Mr. & Mrs. (1956)
- Rockin' the Cha-Cha (1956)
- Bicol Express (1957) - (Third Segment)
- Pabo Real (1957)
- Cavalry Command (1958, a.k.a. The Day of the Trumpet) - Captain Magno Maxalla
- Be My Love (1958)
- Glory at Dawn (1958)
- Azimat (1958, a.k.a. The Seal of Solomon) Malay Film Production Singapore
- Hanggang sa Dulo ng Daigdig (1958)
- Cry Freedom (1959) - Marking
- Tayo'y Magsaya (1959)
- Navy Blues (1960)
- Emily (1960)
- Tres Mosqueteros (1960) - D'Artagnan
- Luis Latigo (1961)
- Jikiri (1962)
- El filibusterismo (1962) - Simoun / Crisostomo Ibarra
- Merrill's Marauders (1962) - Taggy
- The Hook (1963, cast as Enrique Magalona in MGM film.) - Kim a.k.a. The Gook
- Isinusumpa Ko! (1963)
- Mr. Melody (1963)
- A Yank in Viet-Nam (1964) - Andre
- Dugo ng Sugatan (1964)
- Pancho Loves Tita (1964, TV Series) - Pancho
- Moro Witch Doctor (1964) - Martin Gonzaga
- Surabaya Conspiracy (1969, a.k.a. The Gold Seekers, USA TV title) - Captain Haryan
- Pipo (1970, a.k.a. A Time for Dying) - Capt. Furuda
- Sakada (1976, a.k.a. The Tenants) - Don Manuel
- Bitayin si... Baby Ama? (1976)
- 50% Down (1977)
- Bundok ng Susong Dalaga (1983) - (final film role)
