= Francis Magalona =

Filipino rapper (1964–2009)

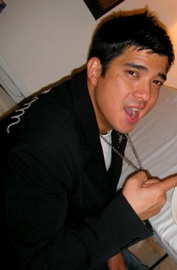
- Born: Francis Durango Magalona; October 4, 1964; Manila, Philippines
- Died: March 6, 2009 (aged 44); Pasig, Philippines
- Resting place: Loyola Memorial Park, Marikina
- Other names: Francis M; Master Rapper; The Man from Manila; Kiko; The Mouth; The Filipino King of Rap
- Spouse: Pia Arroyo (m. 1985)
- Children: 8, including Maxene, Frank, Saab, and Elmo
- Parents: Pancho Magalona (father); Tita Duran (mother)
- Relatives: Enrique B. Magalona (grandfather)
- Musical career
- Genres: Hip hop; alternative hip hop; rap rock; political hip hop
- Occupations: Rapper; songwriter; actor
- Instrument: Vocals
- Years active: 1984–2009
- Labels: OctoArts International Inc. (now PolyEast) (1989–1993); BMG (Pilipinas), Inc. (now Sony Music) (1994–2006)

Francis Durango Magalona (October 4, 1964 – March 6, 2009), also known as Francis M, was a Filipino rapper, songwriter, and actor. He is regarded as an influential figure in Pinoy hip hop.

Magalona was a son of actors Pancho Magalona and Tita Duran. He started as a breakdancer and appeared in the teen comedy film Bagets 2 (1984) and the variety show That's Entertainment (1987) while building his rap career.

His songs "Mga Kababayan", "Man from Manila", "Ito Ang Gusto Ko", "Kabataan Para sa Kinabukasan", "Watawat", "Luv 4 Lyf", and "Lando" (with Gloc-9) have each won the Awit Award for Best Rap Recording, while "Kaleidoscope World" is another notable single. His notable albums include Rap Is FrancisM (1992), FreeMan (1995), Happy Battle (1996), The Oddventures of Mr. Cool (1998), and FreeMan 2 (2000). Magalona also ventured into rock, fronting the band Hardware Syndrome. His music addressed social issues including politics, drug addiction, colonial mentality, and intellectual property rights. In television, Magalona was a presenter for MTV Asia, Channel V Philippines, and the noontime variety show Eat Bulaga! (1997–2009). He was also a judge on Philippine Idol (2006).

Magalona died of leukemia in 2009, aged 44.

== Early life and career ==
Francis Durango Magalona was born on October 4, 1964. He was named after Saint Francis of Assisi, whose feast day falls on his birthday. He was the eighth of the nine children of actors Pancho Magalona and Tita Duran, popular film stars of the 1940s and 1950s. His grandfather, Enrique B. Magalona, served as a senator from 1946 to 1955. Magalona was also a second cousin of Cacai and Regine Velasquez through his mother whose first cousin was Gerardo Velasquez.

For his high school education, he attended the Don Bosco Technical College in Mandaluyong then proceeded to San Beda College in Manila, attending from 1981 to 1984.

Magalona started out as a breakdancer in the 1980s. He was cast in several Filipino movies including Bagets 2 (1984). He was the resident DJ/rapper in the IBC variety show Loveli'Ness.

== Music career ==
=== Filipino hip hop and nationalistic rap ===
In 1990, he released the album Yo!, the first commercially released Filipino rap album. Yo! included several popular singles such as "Mga Kababayan" (Fellow Countrymen), "Gotta Let 'Cha Know", "Cold Summer Nights", and a duet with Pia Arroyo "Loving You" which made her the first Filipina woman to rap on a record. His tracks feature politically conscious and thought-provoking rhymes in both English and Tagalog, in the style known as Filipino hip hop.

In 1992, Francis Magalona released Rap Is FrancisM (1992). With tracks addressing the various cultural and social problems that plagued his country such as drug addiction in "Mga Praning" (Paranoids), political instability in "Halalan" (Elections) as well as the detrimental effects of a colonial mentality in "Tayo'y Mga Pinoy" (We Are Filipinos), the record's complexity and conscious message earned it its classic status. This album helped tag Magalona as one of the most politically conscious voices of his generation.

=== Hardware Syndrome and the merging of rap with Pinoy rock ===
The release of his third album, Meron akong ano! (I Got Something!) in 1993 marked the beginning of Magalona's experimentation with Pinoy rock. It also saw the birth of Hardware Syndrome—previously known as Cannabis—the band that would, with Magalona at its helm, introduce the merging of Pinoy rock and rap to the Filipino music audience. Members over the years included musicians Carlo Sison, Francis Villanueva, Niño Mesina, Boyet Aquino, Elmer Blancaflor, Noel Mendez, Perf de Castro, Benjie "Bagets" Mendez, Albert Tamayo, DJ Kimozave, DJ Radikal MK, Otep Concepcion, Kenji Marquez, Jack Rufo, and Wendell Garcia.

Magalona was soon cited for excellence in both genres of music. He collaborated with other notable OPM artists including Andrew E., Joey Ayala, Heber Bartolome of Banyuhay, Ryan Cayabyab, Mike Hanopol of Juan Dela Cruz Band, Michael V., Death Threat, and the band Eraserheads. In the latter part of his career, Magalona worked together with rappers Pikaso, Gloc 9 and the Pinoy rock band Parokya ni Edgar. In 1994, Magalona moved from Octo-Arts EMI Philippines, which had released all of his previous albums, to BMG Records (Pilipinas) Inc. with Musiko Records (is a wholly owned of sub-labels of a BMG Records (Pilipinas) Inc.), the same label as the seminal Pinoy rock group, The Eraserheads.

Freeman was released the following year, 1995, and firmly established Magalona's legitimacy in the Pinoy rock scene. Tracks such as "Three Stars & A Sun", "Kabataan Para Sa Kinabukasan" (Children For The Future), "Suckin' on Helium/Kaleidoscope World" would become defining touchpoints in Magalona's body of work. A track titled "Intellectual Property Rights" would sample a speech by then-president Fidel V. Ramos. Intellectual property rights was an issue that would continue to be an important and very personal advocacy for Magalona. "Kaleidoscope World" went on to win 1996 Awit Award for Best Produced Record of the Year, and the 1996 NU 107 Rock Award for Song of the Year. Its music video was directed by the celebrated director/cinematographer Raymond Red

Magalona's next album, Happy Battle, was released in 1996. The launch for the video-game themed album at the Hard Rock Cafe in Makati was noted by the press for its wide range of influences: aside from fans of Magalona's music, he had showbiz fans and coworkers from Eat Bulaga!, where he had already started hosting; and two sets of Sony PlayStations with giant screens set up so people could play video games while watching the gig. The album was also notable for a number of significant collaborations: "Unstrung Heroes" with Ely Buendia; "Sapot" (Web) with project band Planet Garapata, which included Raimund Marasigan, Jeng Tan, and Mark Lakay, who would later form Sandwich; and "Make Your Move" with pioneer Filipino punk band Betrayed. In keeping with the nationalistic theme in Magalona's work, 1-800-Ninety-Six was written in celebration of the centennial of the Philippine revolution of 1896. "Rainy" won Best Folk song, and the album itself would become the only album to win Best Rock and Best Rap Album at the Katha Awards. When Magalona was diagnosed with leukemia, he and his wife Pia would use the album name "Happy Battle" as a reference to his fight against cancer.

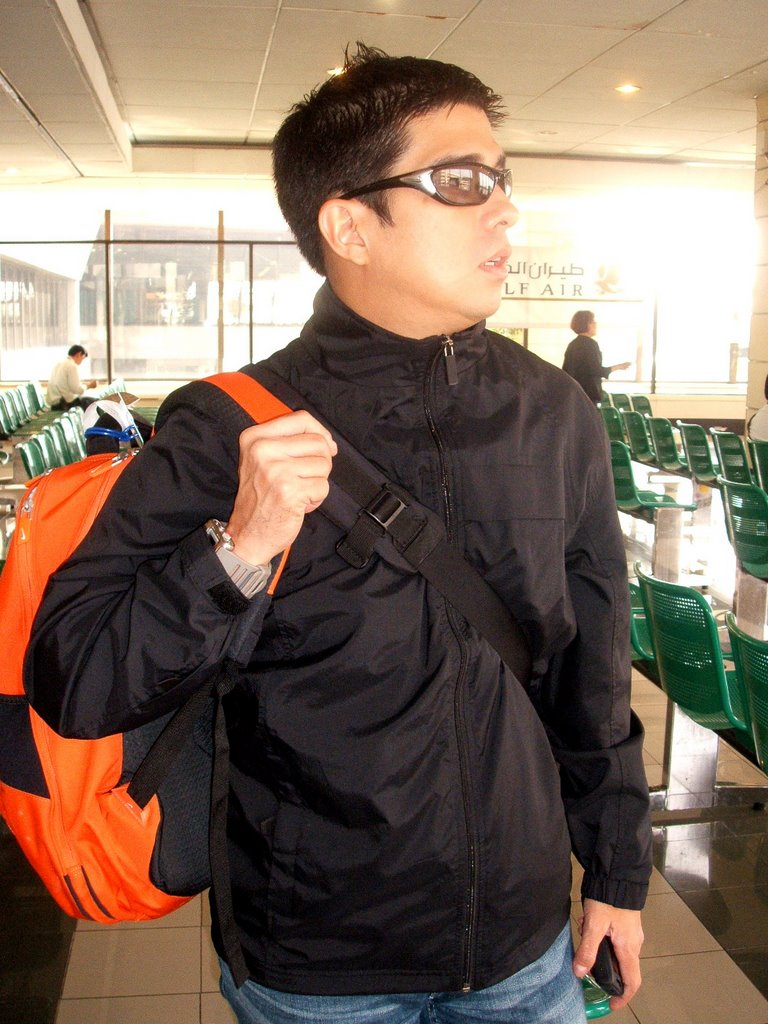
Magalona at Ninoy Aquino International Airport in 2006

=== Later albums with Sony Music ===
The 1998 album The Oddventures of Mr. Cool saw a move from the last two albums' heavy guitar sound and explored mellow, urban-style rapping. It featured the song "Whole Lotta Lovin'", whose music is a sample of the Eraserheads song "Alapaap" (Heaven).

Later albums with BMG (now with Sony Music) would include Interscholastic (1999), which featured adaptations of various artists' songs; and Freeman 2 (2000), which would echo many of the themes that had made the first Freeman album so popular. In 2002, his greatest hits album The Best of FrancisM was released by Musiko Records and BMG Records (Pilipinas) Inc. 2004 in turn saw the release of a single titled "Pambihira Ka" (You're Remarkable).

=== Independent projects ===
In 2002, with the assistance of then FUBU Philippines' management employees Carlo Maniquiz and Nick Tuason, Magalona launched a compilation album of the same name.

Magalona founded his own record company called Red Egg Records, and a production company, Filipino Pictures Inc., where he served as the resident director. Through his production company, Magalona produced and directed music videos for several bands and solo artists such as Ely Buendia. His work on Sponge Cola's "KLSP" won Best Rock Video at the 2006 MYX Video Awards.

Shortly before his death, Magalona collaborated with Buendia and other Filipino artists on a project titled The Sickos Project. The sessions were later released as In Love and War in 2010 after his death.

== Television career ==
In addition to co-hosting LoveliNess, Magalona was one of the original members of the youth oriented show That's Entertainment in 1987. He was also a co-host of the noontime variety show Eat Bulaga!. Magalona coined the word Dabarkads as a nickname for the Eat Bulaga! family i.e. the presenters, production team, and fans. Dabarkads is a tadbalik of the Tagalog word barkada, which means "group of friends".

He was also a VJ for MTV Asia and Channel V Philippines. He was MTV Asia's first Filipino VJ and remained with the network from 1996 to 2000.

He was also known for starring in the second installment of Bagets (1984). In 1997, Magalona played the lead role in the made-for-TV movie Kamada by Raymond Red. The film, a full-length feature shot on 16 mm, received awards from The Philippines Broadcasting Television and Asian TV Awards during the same year.

He was also chosen by Fremantle Media, owners of American Idol as one of the judges of in the first Philippine Idol season that aired on ABC (now TV5). Magalona and his fellow judges Ryan Cayabyab and Pilita Corrales were not retained when the franchise transferred to GMA Network in 2008 with a different title: Pinoy Idol. Aside from television, he also hosted live events and presentations.

== Other endeavors ==
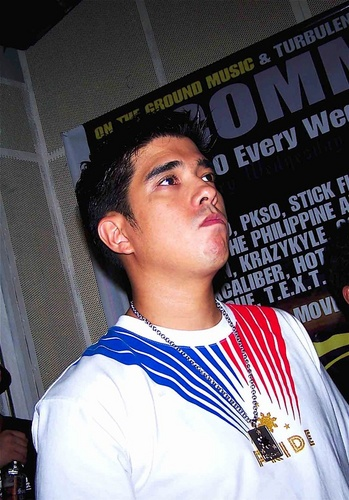
Magalona wearing clothing his company had designed.

Magalona was a photographer and submitted pictures to magazines for publication. News reports note that he was overjoyed when he was accepted as a member of the Camera Club of the Philippines, and eventually received critical acclaim for his photographs.

Magalona also established a clothing line named FMCC, which stood for "FrancisM Clothing Co." FMCC is sold in stores called "3 Stars & A Sun."

He also started a foundation with Ely Buendia called Heartist Foundation, which aims to help Filipino artists with health and commercial concerns.

== Legal issues ==
In 2001, Magalona was arrested for alleged possession and use of cannabis whilst inside his vehicle in Quezon City; he was later acquitted of all charges in 2004 when no sufficient evidence was found.

== Personal life ==
Magalona was introduced by actor Richard Gomez to Pia Arroyo at a party in a disco owned by film director Ishmael Bernal, and the couple married in 1985. The couple had eight children, two of whom were Magalona's stepchildren: Unna (born 1983), Nicolo (born 1984), and television personalities Maxene (born 1986), Frank (born 1987), Saab (born 1988), Elmo (born 1994), Arkin (born 1999), and Clara (born 2000) who entered showbiz to follow their father's footsteps.

On an episode of the YouTube series Pinoy Pawnstars uploaded on October 17, 2023, Abegail Rait, a former flight attendant, claimed to have had a relationship with Magalona and that they have a 15-year-old daughter together.

== Illness and death ==
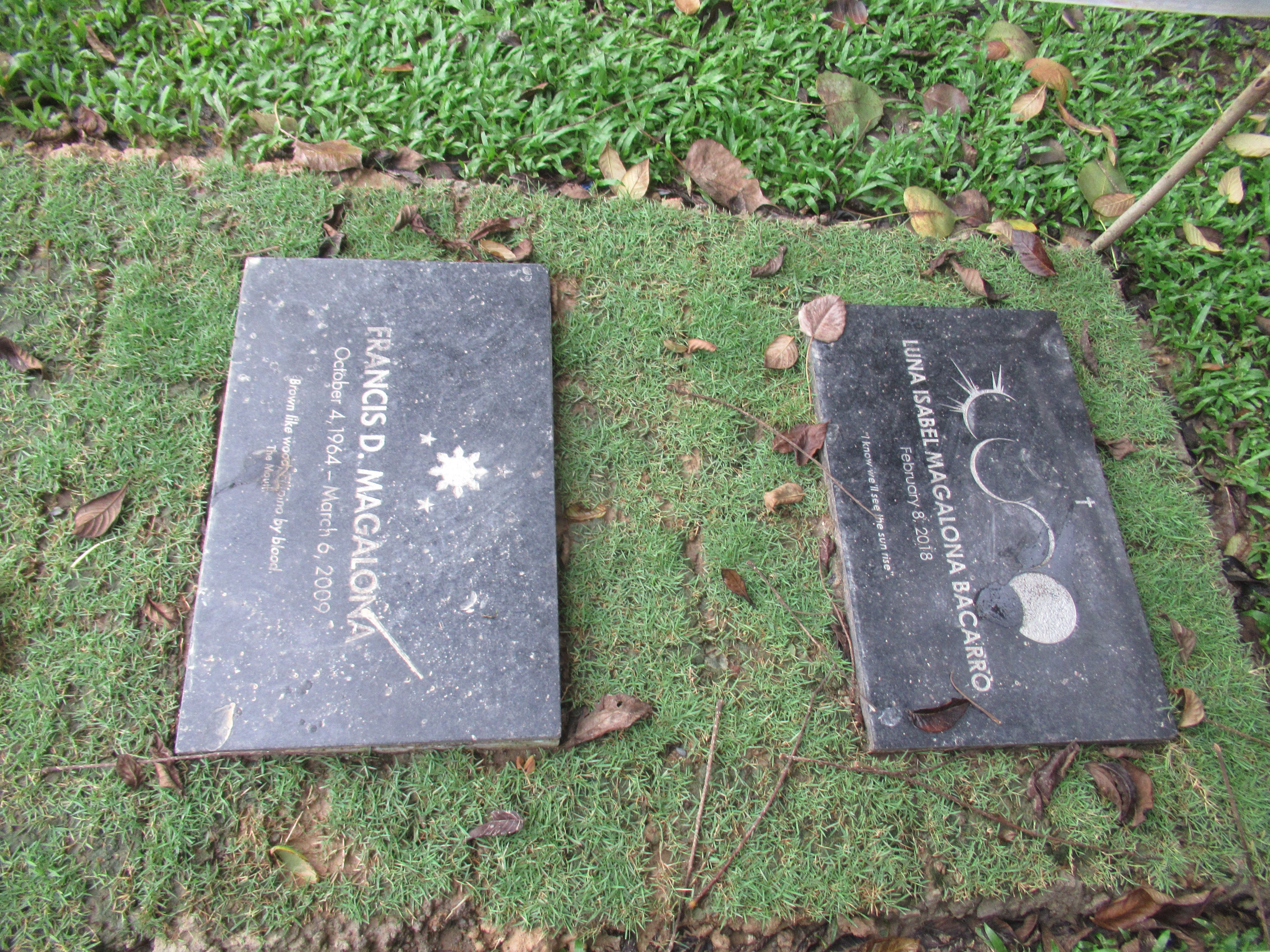
Grave of Francis Magalona and his granddaughter, Luna Isabel Bacarro, daughter of Saab Magalona, at Loyola Memorial Park, Marikina

Magalona was diagnosed with acute myeloid leukemia on August 8, 2008, at The Medical City Ortigas in Pasig. Appealing to the media and the public, Magalona said:

I don't want a media circus, [...] I want privacy with my family. What I'd rather talk about is how we can solicit blood donations to replace the supply that I have consumed in the hospital.

— Francis Magalona, August 2008

After his first treatment and discharge, he made his return on Eat Bulaga! together with Ely Buendia, who had also been recently discharged. His daughter Maxene stated that "He always did what he wanted to do. He never let anyone or anything stop him from doing what he loved to do. He still went to the Camera Club, he still took pictures, every time he was discharged from the hospital, he recorded songs with Ely Buendia. He taught us that life is short but it can be well lived. Don't waste your time in the world."

His wife, Pia, later described her husband's battle with the disease, saying "Francis was a very passionate person. When he was angry, he was very expressive. He would get angry with his cancer. That was his way of coping with it. But he didn't give up. I remembered that he told me, 'I'm going down fighting.'"

On March 6, 2009, at 12 noon, Magalona succumbed to multiple organ failure secondary to septic shock, secondary to pneumonia in the immunocompromised (immediate cause); acute respiratory failure secondary to acute respiratory distress syndrome (antecedent cause); underlying cause: Chronic myelogenous leukemia blast crisis. He had undergone several chemotherapy sessions since he was diagnosed the previous year and had been expected to undergo a bone marrow transplantation and peripheral blood stem cell transplantation.

The announcement was first made over Eat Bulaga! through Vic Sotto. News of his death sparked a surge of web traffic to several Philippine news sites, causing a momentary slowdown in their operation. Guests at his wake held at a mortuary chapel in Christ the King Parish Greenmeadows, Quezon City included former president Corazon Aquino (who also died five months after Magalona's passing), along with other politicians and artists who paid tribute to Magalona's contribution to Filipino music and to national pride – the dominant advocacy theme in FrancisM's music. Fans arrived in droves to pay their last respects, some of them making a point to wear shirts from Magalona's FMCC line. Numerous television programs, ranging from noontime variety shows to primetime newscasts and late night news documentaries, paid tribute to Magalona.

He had been slated to appear as a special surprise guest at the Eraserheads' "The Final Set" reunion concert on March 7, 2009. Since he died the day before, the band instead dedicated the concert to Magalona. Buendia rapped the 22-bar portion in "Superproxy" which Magalona wrote, and the band performed the reprise of "Kaleidoscope World."

Magalona was cremated before daybreak at La Funeraria Paz, Quezon City on March 11, 2009. A final Mass was held for him at the Christ the King Parish Greenmeadows later in the morning. Hours later, his ashes were laid to rest at the Loyola Memorial Park in Marikina, causing traffic to stall in the Marikina Riverbanks area near the park as fans and numerous people from the entertainment industry joined the convoy. The Philippine Army rendered military honors to Magalona in recognition of his patriotism and service as a sergeant in the reserves. His widow, Pia, received the flag draped on his coffin.

=== Post-death crisis ===
Magalona holds up two medals awarded by the Camera Club of the Philippines

The Magalona family was also firm against any attempts to capitalize on FrancisM's death and persona. On March 17, 2009, a group of Filipino expatriates in Dubai, UAE and Saudi Arabia, announced plans to hold tribute concerts where performers will sing his songs, with the proceeds supposedly going to a foundation set up in his honor and to the Philippine Red Cross. Pia and Maxene later came out and denounced the organizers, saying that neither concert had the family's blessings and the foundation did not exist. They particularly admonished the concert organizers for using the Red Cross to attract attendees. Pia also asked the public not to patronize sellers of fake FMCC goods, which started to appear within days of Magalona's death. Their house had been broken into a number of times, the apparent main targets being Magalona's personal items, along with his children's belongings. One of the stolen items was a laptop computer on which unpublished FMCC designs were stored.

== Legacy and influence ==
Magalona would ultimately be cited not just the "King of Philippine Rap" but also "The Father of Pinoy Hip Hop". Magalona's contributions to the genre have been featured in several international hip hop publications including the All Music Guide to Hip-Hop: The Definitive Guide to Rap and Hip-Hop (2003) published by Backbeat Books; as well as the May 2004 issue of the U.S.-based publication The Source. He was also given the Pioneer Hall of Fame Award by Empire Entertainment at the 1st Annual Philippine Hip-Hop Music Awards in 2005.

Magalona was the recipient of the MTV Pilipinas Video Music Awards Generations Award in 2006 "in recognition of his career that has spanned decades and broken boundaries, and for his music which continues to inspire generations of artists and music fans both here and abroad." He was the second person so honored, the first having been singer Gary Valenciano at the 2005 rites.

On March 18, 2009, the Philippine Government – through the efforts of the National Commission for Culture and the Arts—recognized Magalona with by awarding him a posthumous Presidential Medal of Merit. The award's citation noted that it had been given "for his musical and artistic brilliance, his deep faith in the Filipino and his sense of national pride that continue to inspire us."

Several supporters of Magalona launched an online petition to award him, the Order of National Artist, which is the highest recognition for Philippine artists. However, nominations for the National Artist award will have to be done after three years as nominations for the order are closed. His daughter Maxene has indicated that she intends to continue Magalona's projects, including his The Sickos Project album with Buendia, and a documentary about his battle with cancer. The young actress stated: "We will coordinate with the people he had been working with, [...] I understand that Papa is a big part of history."

In 2013, Kaleidoscope World, a tribute film starring Yassi Pressman and Sef Cadayona, was shown during the 2013 Metro Manila Film Festival. In 2016, the Philippine Educational Theater Association (PETA) featured Magalona's songs in the dystopian sci-fi jukebox musical 3 Stars and a Sun.

Magalona was given a tribute during a segment at the 2019 Southeast Asian Games opening ceremony at the Philippine Arena, where three of his songs were rendered by his son Elmo Magalona, who sang "Man from Manila", Iñigo Pascual, who gave a rendition of "Mga Kababayan", and KZ Tandingan, who sang "Tayo'y Mga Pinoy". The said segment in the ceremony showcased the energy of the Filipino people.

On October 10, 2022, Maxene Magalona posted her version of "Kaleidoscope World" to celebrate World Mental Health Day. She had recorded her version several days earlier on October 4, her father's 58th birthday anniversary. In December of that year, during the UAAP Season 85 cheerdance competition, the FEU Cheerdancers performed their routine to a medley of Magalona's songs. They went on to finish second in the competition. Weeks later, during the Eraserheads Huling El Bimbo reunion concert, a hologram of Magalona was brought out. Magalona's sons Elmo and Arkin then performed "Superproxy" alongside the hologram. Maxene praised her brothers' performance, and thanked the band "for honoring Francis M through this super cool hologram".

In 2026, a version of "Mga Kababayan Ko" recorded by the P-pop group SB19 was featured on the soundtrack of the animated film Forgotten Island. SB19 also performed this song at Lollapalooza that year.

A number of Filipino rappers have acknowledged Magalona as an influence and inspiration including Abra, Bassilyo, Rye Armamento of the '90s hip-hop group Sun Valley Crew, Loonie, Gloc-9, and Ruby Ibarra.

== Discography ==
=== Studio albums ===
Title	Album details
Yo!	Released: 1990; Label: OctoArts International, Inc.; Format: CD, LP, cassette
Rap Is FrancisM	Released: 1992; Label: OctoArts International, Inc.; Format: CD, cassette
Meron Akong Ano!	Released: 1993; Label: OctoArts International, Inc.; Format: CD, cassette
FreeMan	Released: April 1995; Label: BMG Records (Pilipinas) Inc.; Format: CD, cassette
Happy Battle	Released: 1996; Label: BMG Records (Pilipinas) Inc.; Format: CD, cassette
The Oddventures of Mr. Cool	Released: 1998; Label: BMG Records (Pilipinas) Inc.; Format: CD, cassette
FreeMan 2	Released: September 23, 2000; Label: BMG Records (Pilipinas) Inc., Greater East Asia Music; Format: CD, cassette

=== Collaborative albums ===
In Love and War (with Ely Buendia)	Released: May 25, 2010; Label: Sony Music; Format: CD

=== Extended plays ===
Title	Album details
Francis M.	Released: 1989; Formats: cassette; Label: OctoArts
Mga Kababayan - E.P. Dance Remix	Released: 1990; Formats: cassette; Label: OctoArts
Man From Manila - E.P. Dance Remix	Released: 1991; Formats: cassette; Label: OctoArts
Yeah Boy! Rap Remixes (with Lady Diane and Michael V.)	Released: 1991; Formats: CD; Label: OctoArts EMI
Interscholastic	Released: 1999; Formats: CD; Label: BMG, Red Egg Records

=== Compilation albums ===
- OPM Timeless Collection Gold Series 2 (OctoArts EMI, 1997)
- The Story of Francis M. (The Ultimate OPM Collection) (EMI, 2001)
- Best of Francis M. (BMG, 2002)
- The Story of Francis M. (PolyEast Records, 2009)

=== Singles ===
==== As lead artist ====
List of singles, showing year released and album name
Title	Year	Album
"Loving You" (with Pia Arroyo)	1989	Yo!
"My Only Love"	1989	Yo!
"Gotta Let 'Cha Know"	1990	Yo!
"Cold Summer Nights"	1990	Yo!
"Mga Kababayan"	1990	Yo!
"Christmas Goes Hip-hop"/"Araw-Araw Pasko" (with Jamie Rivera)	1990	Maligayang Pasko Sa Inyong Lahat!
"Man From Manila"	1991	Rap Is FrancisM
"Mga Praning"	1992	Rap Is FrancisM
"Halalan"	1992	Rap Is FrancisM
"Ito Ang Gusto Ko"	1993	Meron Akong Ano!
"Carolina" (with Vic Sotto, Richie D'Horsie and Michael V.)	1993	Non-album single
"Mama's Boys" / "Mga Praning-ning" (with Ogie Alcasid and Michael V.)	1993	Non-album single
"Kaleidoscope World"	1995	FreeMan
"Pikon"	1996	FreeMan
"Kabataan Para Sa Kinabukasan"	1996	FreeMan
"Whole Lotta Lovin'"	1998	The Oddventures of Mr. Cool
"Friends"	1998	The Oddventures of Mr. Cool
"Luv 4 Lyf"	2000	FreeMan 2
"Pambihira Ka, Pinoy!"	2004	Non-album single
"Superproxy 2K6" (with Hardware Syndrome featuring Ely Buendia)	2005	Ultraelectromagneticjam!: The Music of the Eraserheads
"Sino Magsasabi"	2008	Non-album single
"Thou Shalt Not Blink"	2008	Non-album single
"Higante"	2009	In Love and War (with Ely Buendia)
"Bus Stop"	2010	In Love and War (with Ely Buendia)
"Wasak Waltz"	2010	In Love and War (with Ely Buendia)

==== As featured artist ====
List of singles, showing year released and album name
Title	Year	Album
"Bagsakan" (Parokya ni Edgar feat. Francis M. And Gloc-9)	2005	Halina Sa Parokya
"Lando" (Gloc-9 feat. Francis M.)	2007	Diploma
"May Sayad Nga" (Mike Swift feat. Francis M.)	2021	Non-album single

=== Other appearances ===
Title	Year	Album
"Dance with Me" (Ogie Alcasid featuring Francis M.)	1993	On Air
"Superproxy" (Eraserheads featuring Francis M.)	1995	Cutterpillow
"1-800-Ninety-Six"	1996	1896: Ang Pagsilang
"Nais Ko"	1996	The Silver Album
"The Yes Yes Show" (Parokya ni Edgar featuring Francis M.)	2004	Inuman Sessions, Vol. 1
"Liwanag" (Gloc-9 featuring Francis M.)	2005	Ako Si...
"Superproxy" (Eraserheads featuring Francis M., Elmo Magalona, Arkin Magalona and Eon Buendia)	2024	Huling El Bimbo (Live at 2022 the Eraserheads Reunion Concert)

== Filmography ==
=== Film ===
- Bagets 2 (1984) – Ponce
- Doctor, Doctor, We Are Sick (1985)
- Mga Kuwento ni Lola Basyang (1985)
- Okleng Tokleng (1986)
- Bukas ng Sabado agi Buka sa Sabitan (1986)
- Ninja Kids (1986) as Tone
- Family Tree (1987) as Edwin
- Kung Aagawin Mo ang Lahat sa Akin (1987)
- Action Is Not Missing (1987)
- Hati Tayo sa Magdamag (1988) – Arthur
- Ang Pumatay ng Dahil sa Iyo (1989)
- Gumapang Ka sa Lusak (aka Dirty Affair) (1990)
- Iputok Mo... Dadapa Ako! (Hard to Die) (1990)
- Pangako ng Puso (1991)
- Joey Boy Munti, 15 Anyos Ka sa Muntinlupa (1991)
- Ano Ba 'Yan (1992) – Kiko
- Boboy Salonga: Batang Tondo (1992)
- Estribo Gang: The Jinggoy Sese Story (1992) – Elmer
- Totoy Buang: Mad Killer ng Maynila (1992) – DJ
- Engkanto (1992) – Uban
- Mama's Boys (1993)
- Ano Ba 'Yan 2 (1993) – Kiko
- Tong-its (1996)
- Saranggola ni Pepe at Juan (1999) – Juan San Miguel/Juan Tamad
- Kwentong Kayumanggi (2002) – Narrator – Hundreds Island and the Bravery of Datu Mabiskeg
- Astigmatism (2004) – Victim 1
- Anak ni Brocka (2005, his last movie)

=== Television ===
- Vilma in Person (co-host)
- Loveli Ness (1987–1990) (co-host)
- U. F. O. (Urbana, Felisa & Others)
- Plaza 1899
- Young Love, Sweet Love
- Mother Studio Presents
- The Maricel Drama Special (1993)
- The Sharon Cuneta Show (1987–1992)
- Regal Romance
- Lovingly Yours, Helen (1986–1996)
- That's Entertainment
- Channel V: Sigaw Manila (1995)
- Maalaala Mo Kaya (1995)
- Kamada (1997)
- Music Bureau (ABC)
- GMA Supershow
- Mikee
- Dear Mikee
- Chibugan Na!
- Spotlight Drama Specials
- Rap 13 (IBC)
- SOP
- GMA Telecine Specials
- MTV's Life's a Beach
- MTV Talk
- GMA Love Stories
- GMA Mini Series
- The Manager: Eat Bulaga Special (2003)
- Show Ko 'To (2004)
- Myx Live (2005)
- Bubble Gang (1999-2005)
- Fam Jam (2005–2006)
- True Love: Eat Bulaga Special (2005)
- A Telefantastic Christmas: The GMA All-Star Special (2005)
- Maynila (2008)
- Eat Bulaga! (GMA, 1997–2009; his death, final TV show)
- Balikbayan (QTV, 2009)
- Student Canteen (1984–1986)
- Philippine Idol (2006) "Judge"
- MTV Pilipinas Music Video Award 2006

== Awards and nominations ==
Year	Award-giving body	Category	Nominated work	Results
1991	4th Awit Awards	Best Dance Recording	"Mga Kababayan"	Won
1991	4th Awit Awards	Best Rap Recording	"Mga Kababayan"	Won
1992	5th Awit Awards	Best Rap Recording	"Man from Manila"	Won
1992	DM 95.5 FM 1st Pinoy Music Award	Best Rap Recording	"Man from Manila"	Won
1994	7th Awit Awards	Best Rap Recording	"Ito ang Gusto Ko"	Won
1996	RX 93.1 Year End Countdown	Male Solo Performance of the Year	"Lab Song"	Won
1996	9th Awit Awards	Best Produced Song of the Year	"Kaleidoscope World"	Won
1996	9th Awit Awards	Best Rap Recording	"Kabataan Para sa Kinabukasan"	Won
1997	10th Awit Awards	Best Folk Pop Song Recording	"Rainy"	Won
1997	RX 93.1 Year End Countdown	Male Solo Performance of the Year	"Girl Be Mine"	Won
1998	11th Awit Awards	Album of the Year	Happy Battle	Won
1998	"RX 93.1 Year-End Awards for OPM artists"	Male Solo Artist of the Year	—N/a	Won
1998	"Nu Rock Awards"	Best Music Video	"Whole Lotta Lovin'"	Nominated
1998	"Nu Rock Awards"	Best Album Packaging	The Oddventures of Mr. Cool	Nominated
1998	"Nu Rock Awards"	Vocalist of the Year	—N/a	Nominated
1999	"RX 93.1 Year-End Awards for OPM artists"	Male Solo Artist of the Year	—N/a	Won
1999	MTV Philippines Music Awards	Favorite Group Video	"Whole Lotta Lovin"	Nominated
2000	13th Awit Awards	Best Rap Recording	"Watawat"	Won
2001	14th Awit Awards	Best Rap Recording	"Luv 4 Lyf"	Won
2001	MTV Pilipinas Music Award	Favorite Male Video	"Luv 4 Lyf"	Nominated
2005	18th Awit Awards	Best Rap Recording	"Pambihira Ka Pinoy"	Nominated
2006	MYX Music Awards	Favorite Collaboration	"Koro" with Greyhoundz and Gloc9	Nominated
2006	19th Awit Awards	Best Engineered Recording	"Superproxy 2k6"	Won
2007	MYX Music Awards	Favorite Collaboration	"Superproxy 2k6" with Ely Buendia	Nominated
2007	MYX Music Awards	Favorite Collaboration	"Umaasa" with 6cyclemind	Nominated
2008	21st Awit Awards	Best Rap Recording	"Lando" with Gloc-9	Won
2008	21st Awit Awards	Best Performance by a Duet	"Lando" with Gloc-9	Nominated
2008	GMMSF Box-Office Entertainment Awards	Outstanding/Special Merit Award for Music(Posthumous Award)	—N/a	Won
2008	MYX Music Awards	Favorite Collaboration	"Lando" with Gloc-9	Nominated
2008	MYX Music Awards	Favorite Urban Video	"Lando" with Gloc-9	Nominated
2009	Eastwood City Walk of Fame	Celebrity Inductee(Posthumous)	Hip Hop Performer, actor, TV Host, Endorser	Won
2009	NU Rock Awards	Hall of Fame Inductee	—N/a	Won
2010	NU Rock Awards	Artist of the Year	Magalona and Ely Buendia	Nominated
2010	NU Rock Awards	Album of the Year	In Love and War (with Ely Buendia)	Nominated
2010	NU Rock Awards	Song of the Year	"Higante" (with Ely Buendia)	Nominated
2010	NU Rock Awards	Producer of the Year	In Love and War (with Ely Buendia)	Won
2020	Myx Music Awards 2020	Myx Magna Award	—N/a	Won
