= Elmo Magalona =

Filipino actor and singer (born 1994)

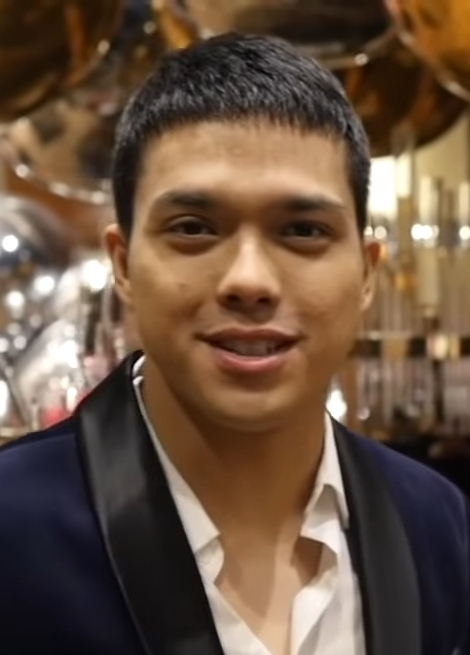
- Magalona in 2020
- Born: Elmo Moses Arroyo Magalona; April 27, 1994 (age 32); Manila, Philippines
- Other name: Moe
- Education: De La Salle–College of Saint Benilde
- Occupations: Actor; singer
- Years active: 2009–present
- Agents: Sparkle (2009–2015); Star Magic (2015–present)
- Height: 5 ft 10 in (178 cm)
- Parents: Francis Magalona (father); Pia Arroyo-Magalona (mother)
- Relatives: Pancho Magalona (grandfather); Tita Duran (grandmother); Maxene Magalona (sister); Frank Magalona (brother); Saab Magalona (sister); Enrique Magalona (great-grandfather); Regine Velasquez (aunt)
- Musical career
- Genres: OPM; pop; R&B
- Instrument: Vocals
- Website: www.superelmo.com

Elmo Moses Arroyo Magalona (born April 27, 1994) is a Filipino actor and singer. He is currently an artist of ABS-CBN and Star Magic. He is the child of Francis Magalona and Pia Magalona.

== Biography ==
=== 2009–2010: Early career ===
Magalona's first appearance in the Pinoy hip-hop/rock scene was when he was six months old being featured on the cover of his father's album FreeMan. He reappeared on an album cover five years later on FreeMan 2. Magalona also appeared in a noodle commercial called "Lucky Me Supreme" along with his father. He appeared as a young drummer in Kjwan's music video, "One Look". He also studied in College of Saint Benilde.

=== 2010–2014: JuliElmo and breakthrough ===
In 2010, Magalona began appearing as a regular on Party Pilipinas as a host and performer. Aside from being known as the "Heir of Rap", he became known as the other half of the musical tandem JuliElmo with Julie Anne San Jose, with whom he collaborated in several YouTube videos. The same year, he was cast in Tweets for My Sweet. He also starred as the lead in the series Together Forever opposite Julie Anne San Jose.

In 2010, Magalona joined the cast of GMA's television pilot Bantatay as a series regular. He also appeared in the fantasy series Kaya ng Powers in a recurring role.

In 2011, the young actor-rapper, together with fellow artist Sam Concepcion, performed as the front act of Miley Cyrus's concert at the SM Mall of Asia concert grounds. In the same year, he was launched as a movie star in Tween Hearts: Class of 2012.

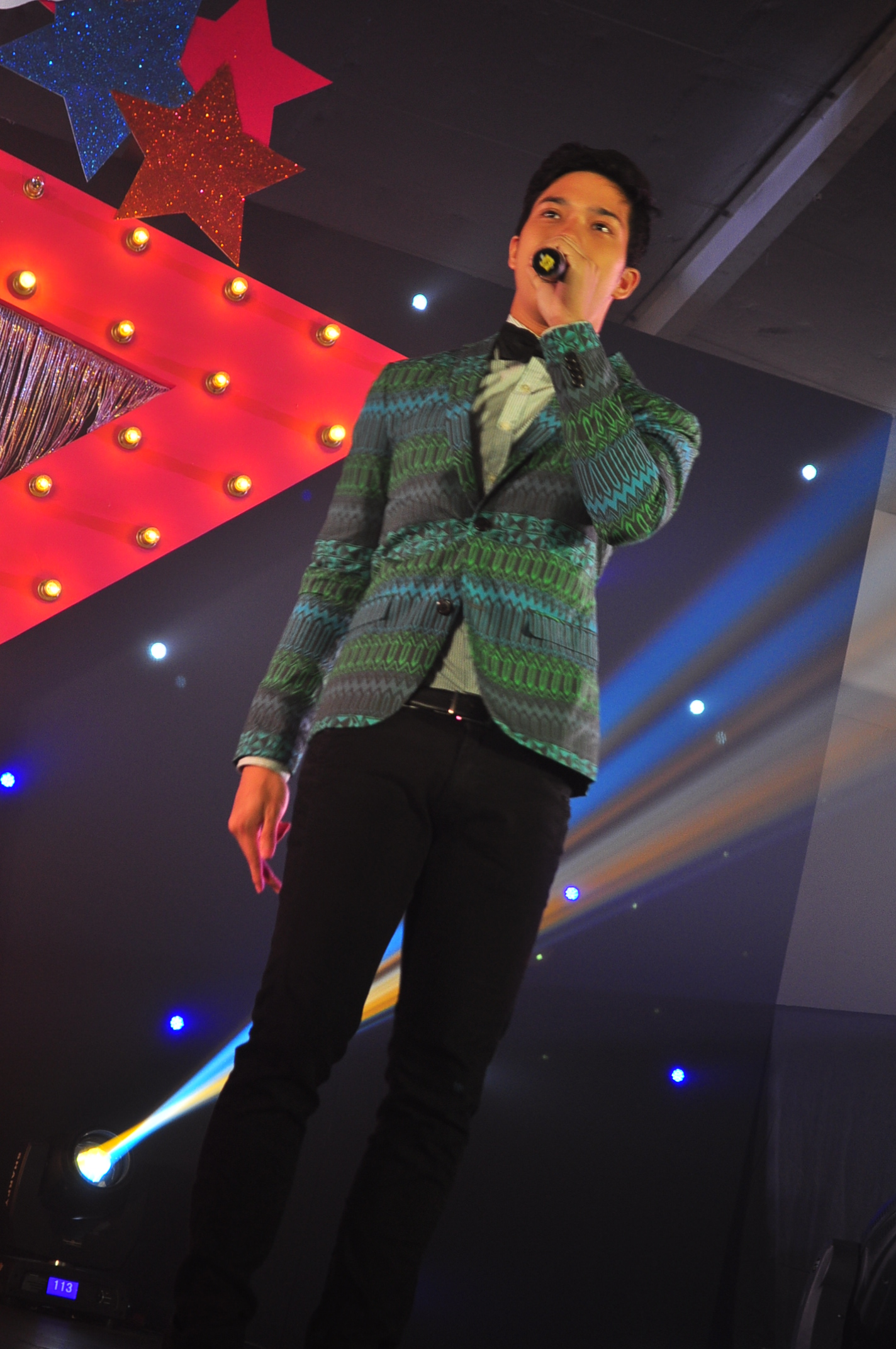
Magalona at the Candy Style Awards, Rockwell Tent in Makati, May 10, 2013

In May 2013, Magalona, in collaboration with Oishi, released a remake of a famous song by his dad, and renamed it "Kaleidoscope World Forever More". The remake featured his duet with his father. A music video was also created, with certain modifications and inserting Elmo digitally into the original music video.

In 2014, he was chosen as one of the interpreters of the Philpop entry, "Qrush on You", alongside Jay-R and Q-York. He also made appearances in the Sunday variety show, Sunday All Stars as a host and performer. He was also the lead star in the 2014 CinemalayaX entry, #Y and then starred in the drama Villa Quintana he played Keempee de Leon's role together with Janine Gutierrez who played Donna Cruz's role. The tandem was reunited again in the primetime soap, More Than Words.

He briefly appeared in Magpakailanman in 2015.

=== 2015–present: Transfer to ABS-CBN and ElNella ===
On November 26, 2015, Magalona left GMA Network and signed a contract with ABS-CBN.

His first project was the 2016 music drama, Born for You with love team partner, Janella Salvador. He collaborated with Salvador in the official soundtrack for Born for You, which reached No. 1 on iTunes Philippines. In October 2016, he released his album, ELMO, which reached a gold record status by PARI.

In 2017, he appeared in Topel Lee's suspense thriller Bloody Crayons with Salvador released nationwide on July 12.

In 2018, he appeared in two Regal Entertainment movies, My Fairy Tale Love Story with Salvador and Walwal.

== Personal life ==
Magalona was born to rapper Francis Magalona and Pia Arroyo-Magalona. His grandparents are actors Pancho Magalona and Tita Duran, while his great-grandfather was former senator Enrique Magalona. He has five siblings, including actors Saab, Frank, and Arkin.

Magalona previously had a relationship with actress and former onscreen partner Janine Gutierrez in 2014. The couple broke up after two years. He then dated actress and former onscreen partner Janella Salvador in 2016. They separated following Salvador's accusations of physical abuse by Magalona.

== Filmography ==
=== Film ===
Year	Title	Role
2011	Tween Academy: Class of 2012	Enzo / Lorenzo
2012	Just One Summer	Daniel Cuaresma Jr. / Nyel
2014	#Y	Miles
2017	Bloody Crayons	Kiko Rivera
2018	My Fairy Tail Love Story	Noah
2018	Walwal	Dondi
2025	Mudrasta: Ang Beking Ina!	Nicolai V. Santillanes

=== Television ===
Year	Title	Role
2009	Family Feud	Himself
2010	Kap's Amazing Stories Kids Edition	Host
2010	Tween Hearts	Himself
2010	Pilyang Kerubin	Aaron Alejandrino
2010	Party Pilipinas: Red Mask	Himself
2010	Kaya ng Powers	Gustin Powers
2010–2013	Party Pilipinas	Host / Performer
2011	Maynila: Victims of Love	Joey
2011	Maynila	Rain
2011	Bantatay	Artie
2011	Maynila: Takot na Puso	Santi
2011	Party Pilipinas: Elmo and Julie Anne: A Wazak Love Story	Elmo Montero
2011	Andres de Saya	Bryan
2011	Ikaw Lang ang Mamahalin	Young Ferdinand
2011	Daldalita	Gino Delgado
2012	Tweets for My Sweet	Dino Mercado
2012	Together Forever	Ely Trinidad
2013–2014	Villa Quintana	Isagani Quintana/Samonte
2013–2015	Sunday All Stars	Host / Performer
2014–2015	More Than Words	Hiro Vera / Sebastian
2015	Magpakailanman: Ang Huling Yakap Sa Nawalang Anak	Daniel
2015	Eat Bulaga!	Guest Performer
2015	Wansapanataym: Christmas Witch	Jessie Reyes
2015–2020	ASAP	Himself / Host / Performer
2016	FPJ's Ang Probinsyano	Andrew Abella
2016	Born for You	Kevin Sebastian
2016	Wansapanataym: Holly & Mau	Mau Benitez
2017	Maalaala Mo Kaya: Bahay	Baning
2017	Wansapanataym: Jasmin's Flower Powers	Thor Begonia
2018	Maalaala Mo Kaya: Mangga	Darling
2019	Ipaglaban Mo: Saltik	Nathan
2019	30th Southeast Asian Games Opening Ceremony	Himself / Performer
2020	A Soldier's Heart	1st Lt. Jethro Mondejar
2022	Click, Like, Share: Unseen	Jerome Loreno
2022	2 Good 2 Be True	Atty. Joseph San Pedro
2022	It's Showtime	Himself / Judge
2022	Panalo o Talo: It's You	Erwin Pinagpala
2022	PIE Night Long: PNL Sessions	Co-host
2023–present	ASAP	Himself / Host / Performer
2026	Blood vs Duty	Harold Rustia

== Discography ==
=== Album ===
Year	Title	Role	Company
2010	In Love and War	Collaborated with Ely Buendia on behalf of Francis M.	Musiko Records; Sony Music Philippines
2011	Tween Academy: Class of 2012 soundtrack	Himself	GMA Records
2014	Philpop 2014	Interpreter together with Jay-R and Q-York	Universal Records
2016	Elmo (self-titled album)	Himself	Universal Records
2016	Born for You (Original Motion Picture Soundtrack)	Himself/Kevin	Star Music

== Awards and nominations ==
Year	Award	Category	Result
2011
2011	Golden Screen TV Awards	Outstanding Performance by an Actor	Nominated
2011	42nd Guillermo Mendoza Memorial Awards	Most Promising Loveteam of 2010 (w/ Julie Anne San Jose)	Won
2011	24th Aliw Awards	Best Teen Performer	Won
2011	Yes Mag 100 Most Beautiful Stars	Newbie	Won
2012	43rd Guillermo Mendoza Memorial Awards	Promising male Singer/Performer	Won
2012	2nd Yahoo OMG Awards	Male Singer of the Year	Nominated
2012	Candy Style Awards 2012	Most Stylish Loveteam (w/ Julie Anne San Jose)	Won
2012	Meg Top Choice 2012	Top Youth Icon of the Year	Won
2013	8th Myx Music Awards	Favorite Guest Appearance in a Music Video (I'll Be There-Julie Anne San Jose)	Won
2013	ABS-CBN Celebrity Push Celebrity Style Awards	Young Stylist Guys On Rise	Won
2013	GMA Artist Center	Most Liked Male Artist	Won
2013	Yahoo! Philippines OMG! Awards	Male Performer of the Year	Won
2013	Yahoo! Philippines OMG! Awards	Fan Club of The Year (JuliElmo Pexers)	Won
2013	Yes Mag 100 Most Beautiful Stars 2013	Breakthrough	Won
2013	PEP List 2013	Male Teen Star of the Year	Won
2014	Yahoo! Philippines OMG! Awards	Male Performer of the Year	Nominated
2014	9th Myx Music Awards	Favorite Media Soundtrack (Kaleidoscope World Forever More Ft. Francis Magalona	Nominated
2014	Cinemalaya	Special Acting Ensemble (w/ Coleen Garcia, Kit Thompson and Sophie Albert)	Won
2017	12th Myx Music Awards	Favorite Artist	Nominated
2017	12th Myx Music Awards	Favorite Male Artist	Nominated
2017	12th Myx Music Awards	Favorite Song for "Kay Dali"	Nominated
2017	12th Myx Music Awards	Favorite Music Video with Janella Salvador for "Alam Mo Ba"	Nominated
2017	12th Myx Music Awards	Favorite Collaboration with Janella Salvador for "Alam Mo Ba"	Nominated
2017	12th Myx Music Awards	Favorite Media Soundtrack with Janella Salvador for "Born For You"	Nominated
2017	12th Myx Music Awards	Favorite MYX Celebrity VJ	Won
