= Enrique Magalona =

Filipino politician (1891-1960)

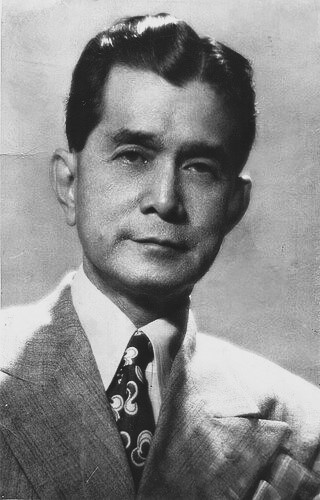

Senator of the Philippines
- In office May 28, 1946 – December 30, 1955

Member, House of Representatives of the Philippines from Negros Occidental's 1st district
- In office June 2, 1931 – May 25, 1946
- Preceded by: Jose C. Locsin
- Succeeded by: Vicente F. Gustilo Sr.

Personal details
- Born: Enrique Magalona y Barrera; November 5, 1891 Saravia, Negros Occidental, Captaincy General of the Philippines
- Died: 1960 (aged 68–69) Philippines
- Party: Liberal (1946–1955); Nacionalista (1922-1946)
- Spouse: Consuelo Gayoso
- Children: 3 (including Pancho)
- Parents: Vicente Magalona y Ledesma (father); Augusta Barrera y Majarocan (mother)
- Education: Colegio de San Juan de Letran
- Profession: Politician

Enrique "Equi" Barrera Magalona Sr. (born Enrique Magalona y Barrera; November 5, 1891 – 1960) was a Filipino politician who had served as a Senator of the Philippines from 1946 to 1955. Prior to being elected to the Senate, he served as the Municipal President of Saravia, Negros Occidental, which is now named in his honor, and as a Representative from Negros Occidental in the Philippine Assembly. He was the father of the late Filipino actor Pancho Magalona and the grandfather of the late Filipino rapper Francis Magalona.

== Early life and education ==
Enrique B. Magalona was born in Saravia, Negros Occidental (now Enrique B. Magalona, Negros Occidental) on November 5, 1891 to Vicente Magalona y Ledesma and Augusta Barrera y Majarocan.

He studied at the Molo Institute in Iloilo, where he obtained both his primary and secondary education. He graduated at Colegio de San Juan de Letran in 1907 with the degree of Bachelor of Arts and La Jurisprudencia, where he received his Bachelor of Laws degree in 1911.

== Political career ==
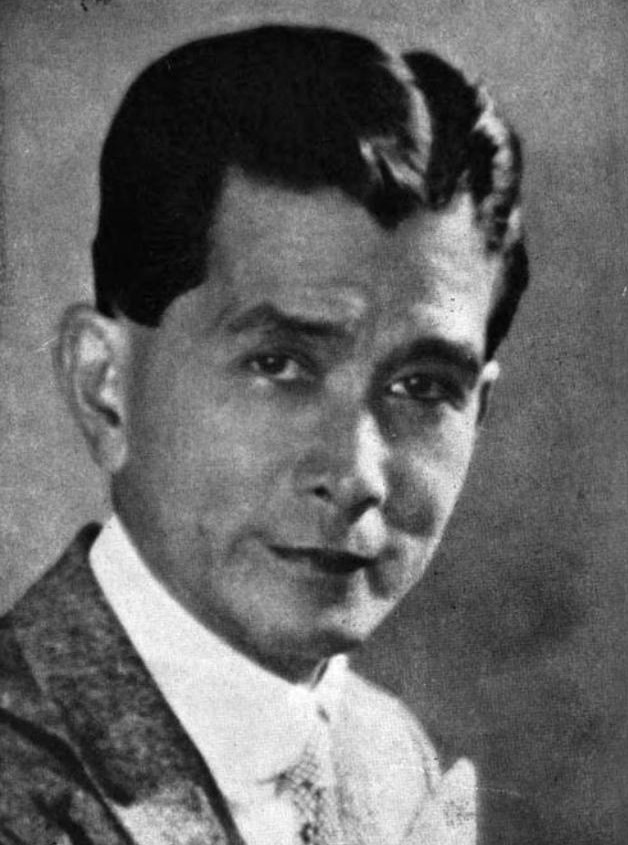
Photograph from The Commercial & Industrial Manual of the Philippines, 1941

Magalona was elected Municipal President of Saravia in 1922 and re-elected to the same post in 1925. In 1926, he was elected President of the Municipal Presidents Convention at Bacolod, Negros Occidental. Senator Magalona was elected representative to the ninth and tenth Philippine Legislature from 1931 to 1934, and then, later elected assemblyman from the first district of Negros Occidental in 1935 and re-elected in 1938. He was elected Senator for two terms from 1946 to 1949 and from 1949 to 1955. Senator Magalona was chairman of the Committees on Accounts and Civil Service; Rules; Public Health; Labor and Immigration and National Exterprises. As lawmaker he authored, among others Republic Act. 342 (Moratorium Act); R.A. 611 (cumulative computation of vacation and sick leaves) and R.A. No. 709 (instruction of Spanish in colleges and universities).

== Personal life ==
Magalona was married to Consuelo Gayoso with two children including Pancho Magalona. His descendants include grandson Francis Magalona and great-grandchildren Maxene Magalona and Elmo Magalona.

== Death ==
Enrique Magalona, Sr. died in 1960.
