= FAMAS Award for Best Actor =

Award presented annually by the Filipino Academy of Movie Arts and Sciences

- Awarded for: Best Performance by an Actor in a Leading Role
- Country: Philippines
- Presented by: Filipino Academy of Movie Arts and Sciences Award
- First award: 1953
- Currently held by: Arjo Atayde; Topakk & Vice Ganda; And the Breadwinner Is... (2024)

The FAMAS Award for Best Actor is one of the FAMAS Awards given to people working in the motion picture industry by the Filipino Academy of Movie Arts and Sciences Award, which are voted on by Palanca Award-winning writers and movie columnists and writers within the industry.

== Winners and nominees ==
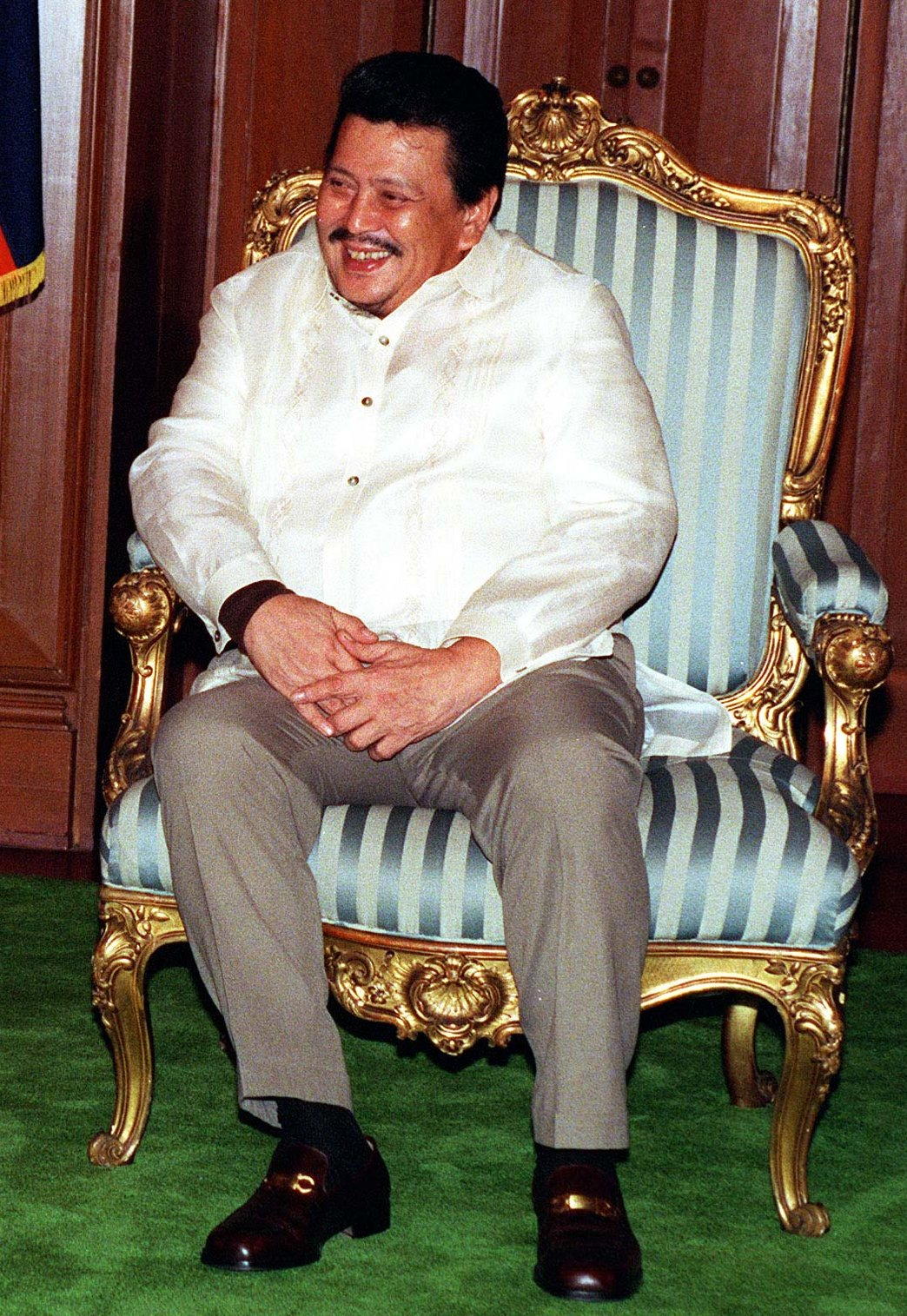
Joseph Estrada has won the award five times from thirteen nominations for his roles in 1962's Markang Rehas, 1964's Geron Busabos: Ang Batang Quiapo, 1966's Ito ang Pilipino, 1969's Dugo ng Bayani and 1981's Kumander Alibasbas.

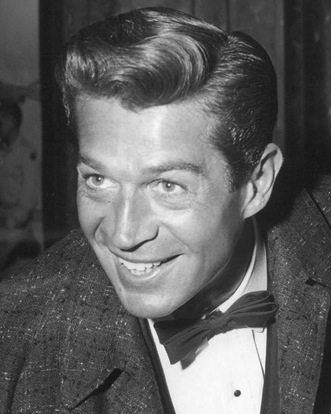
George Nader has been nominated for his role in 1963's Zigzag.

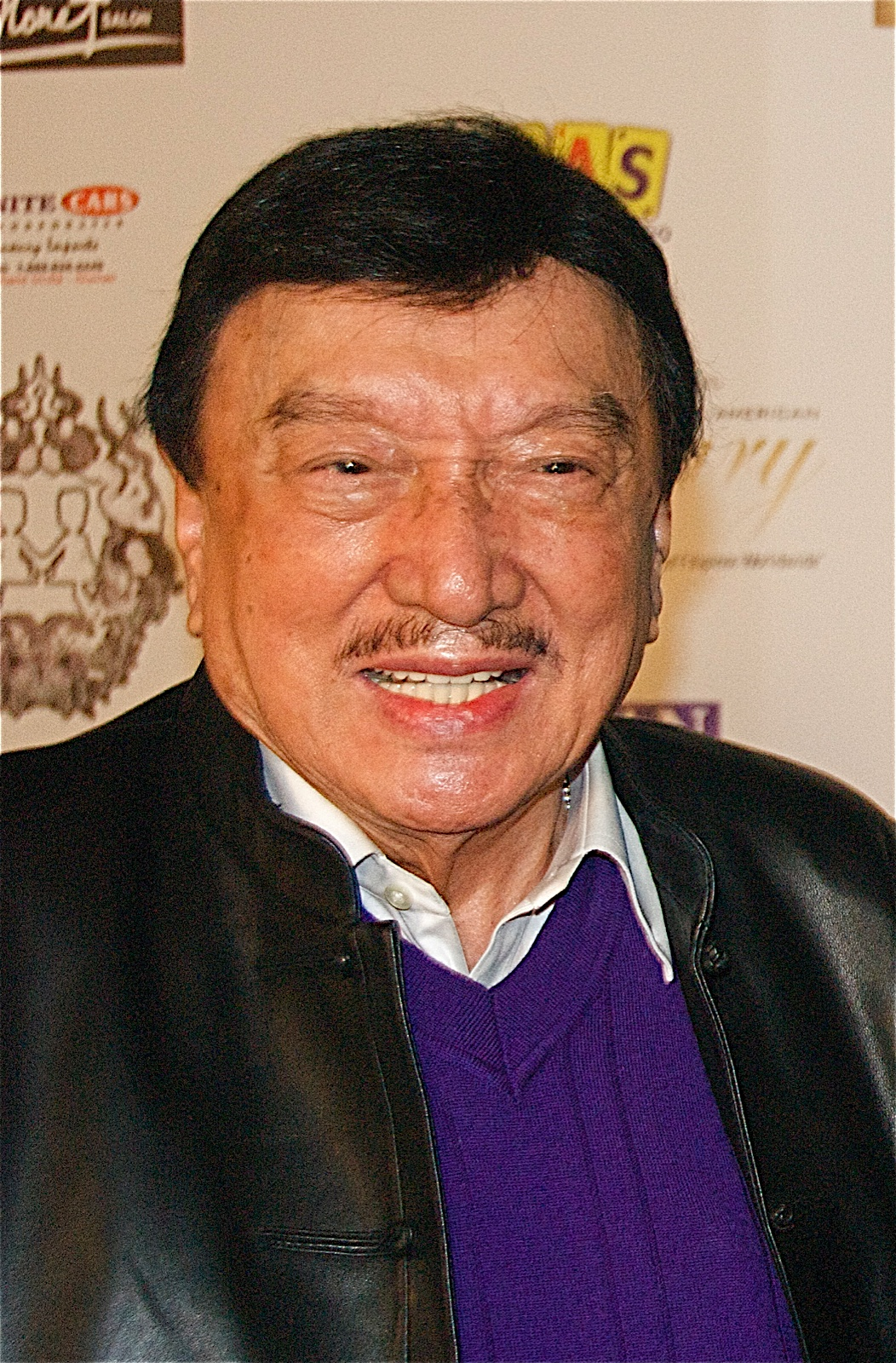
Dolphy has won once from nine nominations for his role in 1977's Omeng Santanasia.

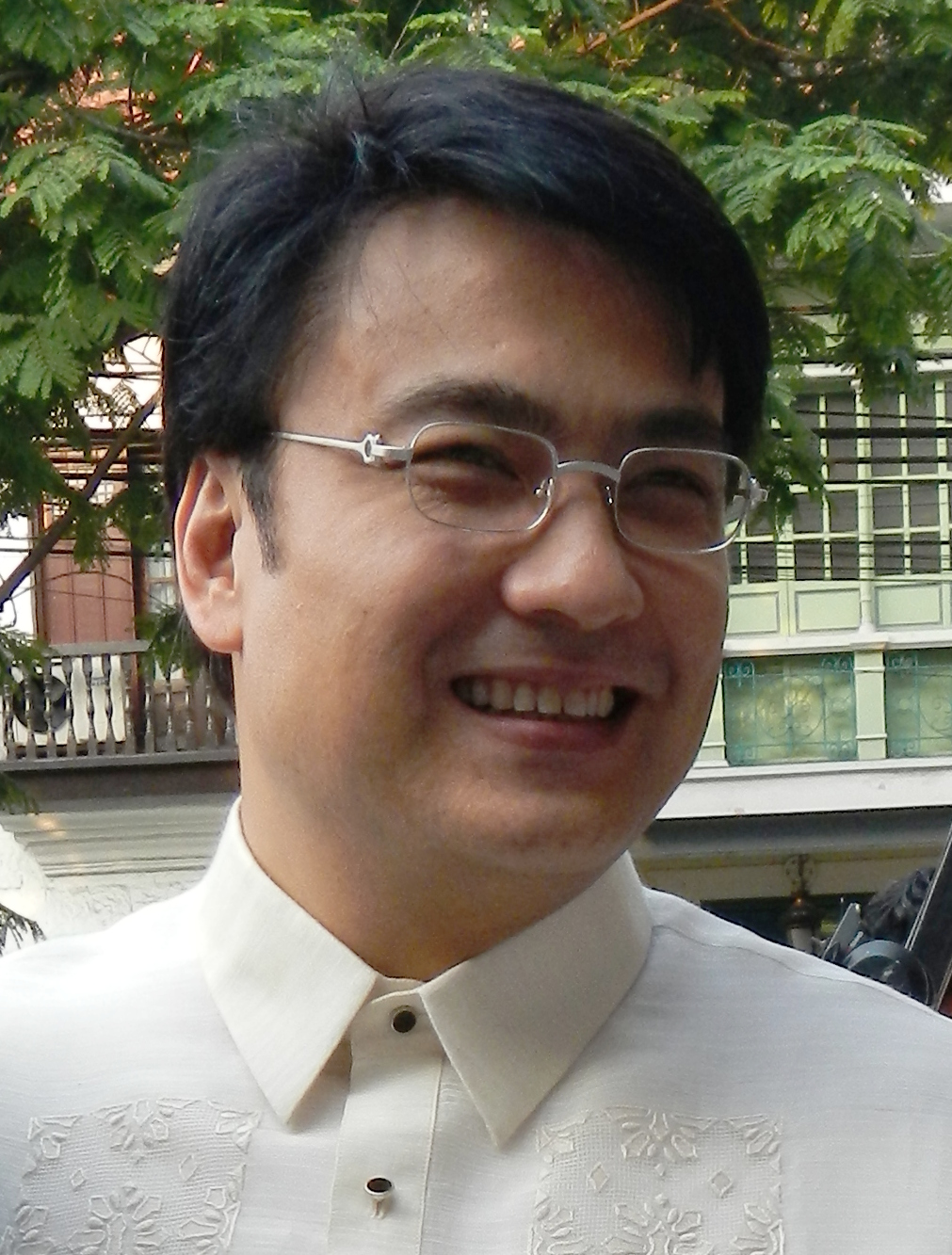
Bong Revilla has won once from ten nominations for his role in 1993's Relax Ka Lang, Sagot Kita.

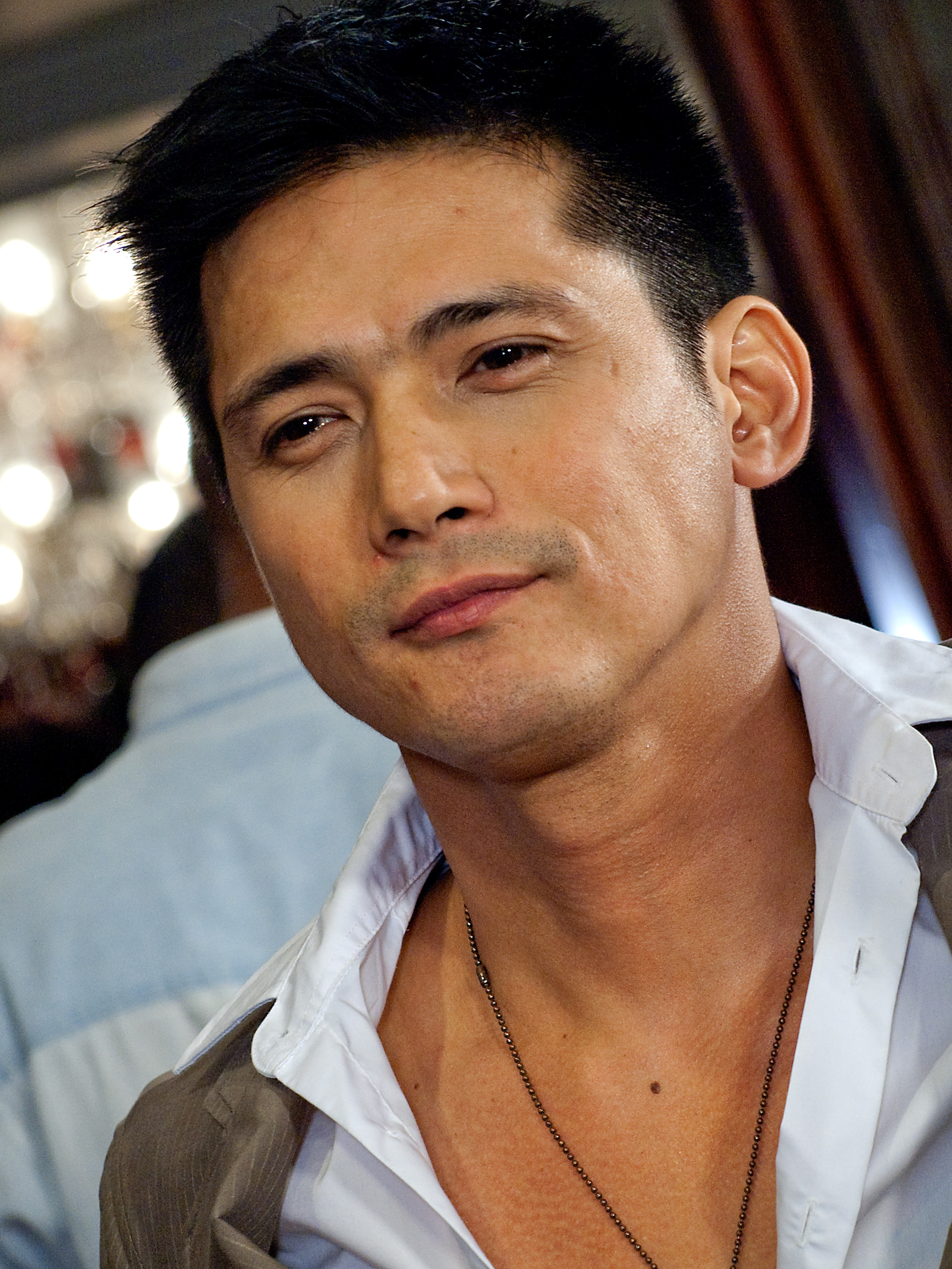
Robin Padilla has won once from four nominations for his role in 2005's La Visa Loca.

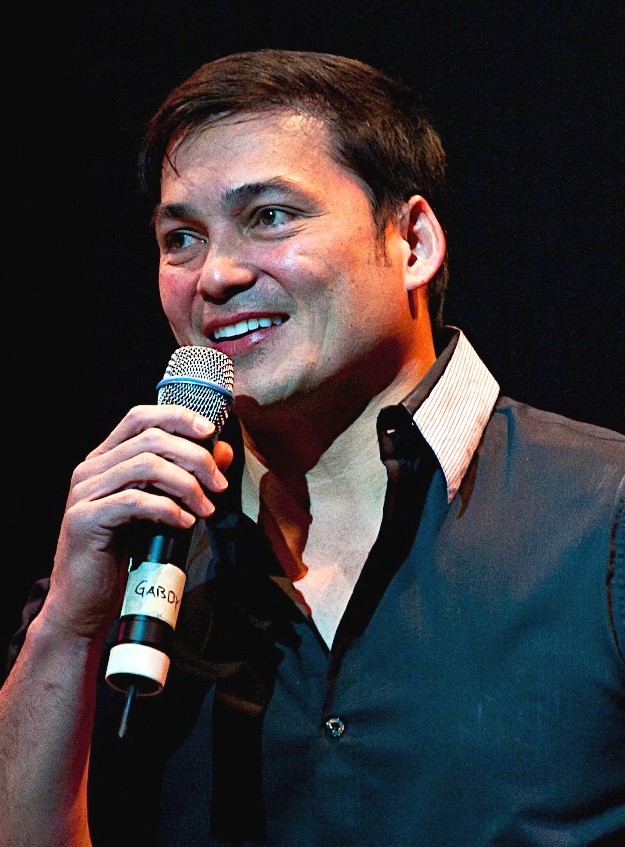
Gabby Concepcion has been nominated twice for his roles in 1991's Una Kang Naging Akin and 2009's I Love You, Goodbye.

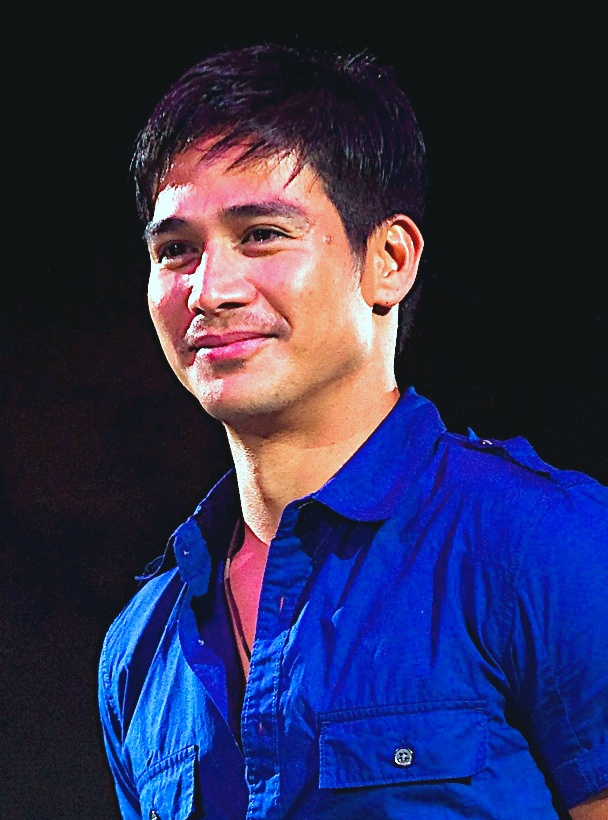
Piolo Pascual has won once from six nominations for his role in 2004's Milan.

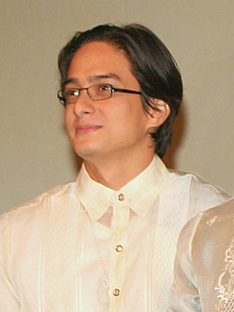
Ryan Agoncillo has been nominated once for his role in 2006's Umaaraw, Umuulan.

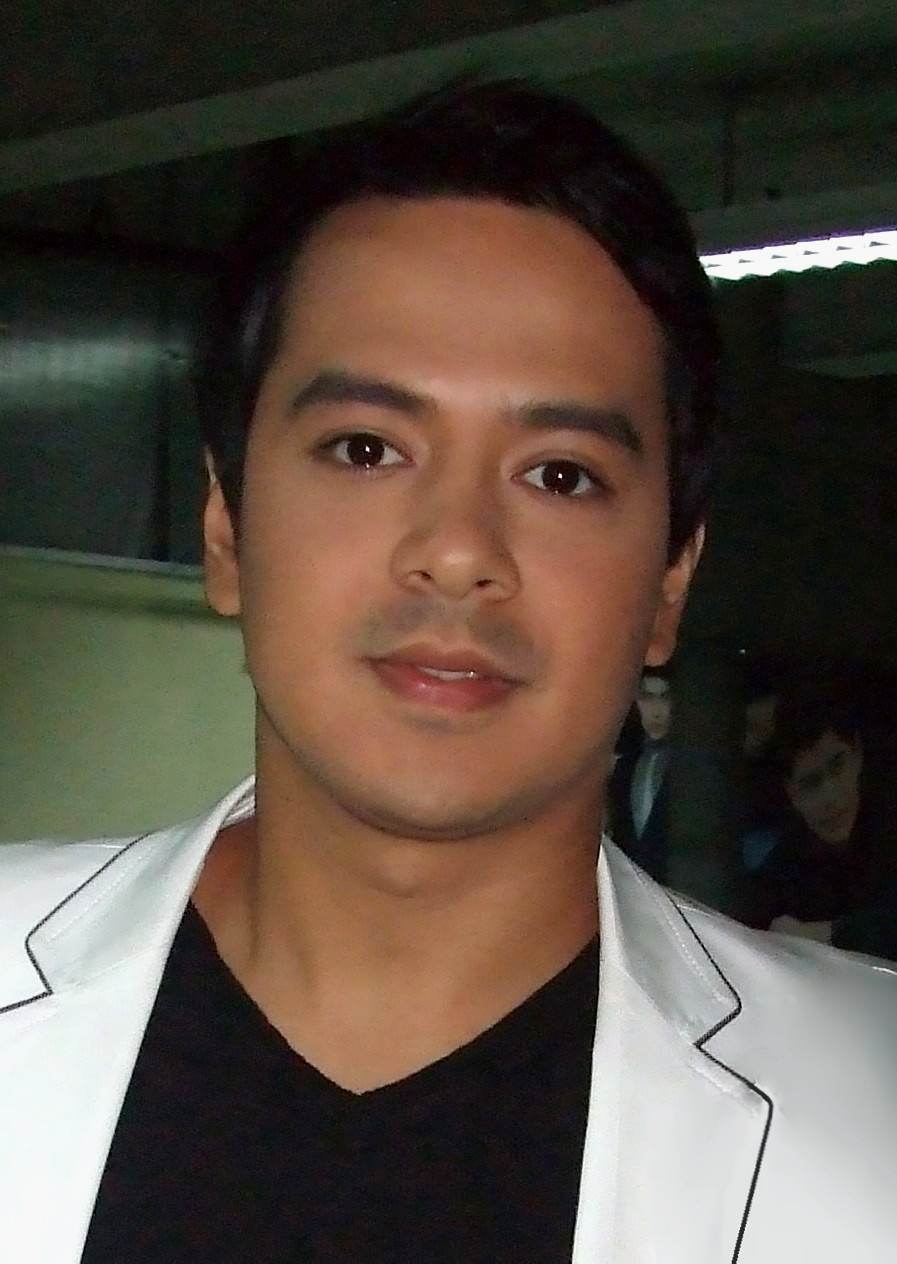
John Lloyd Cruz has won once from seven nominations for his role in 2010's Miss You Like Crazy.

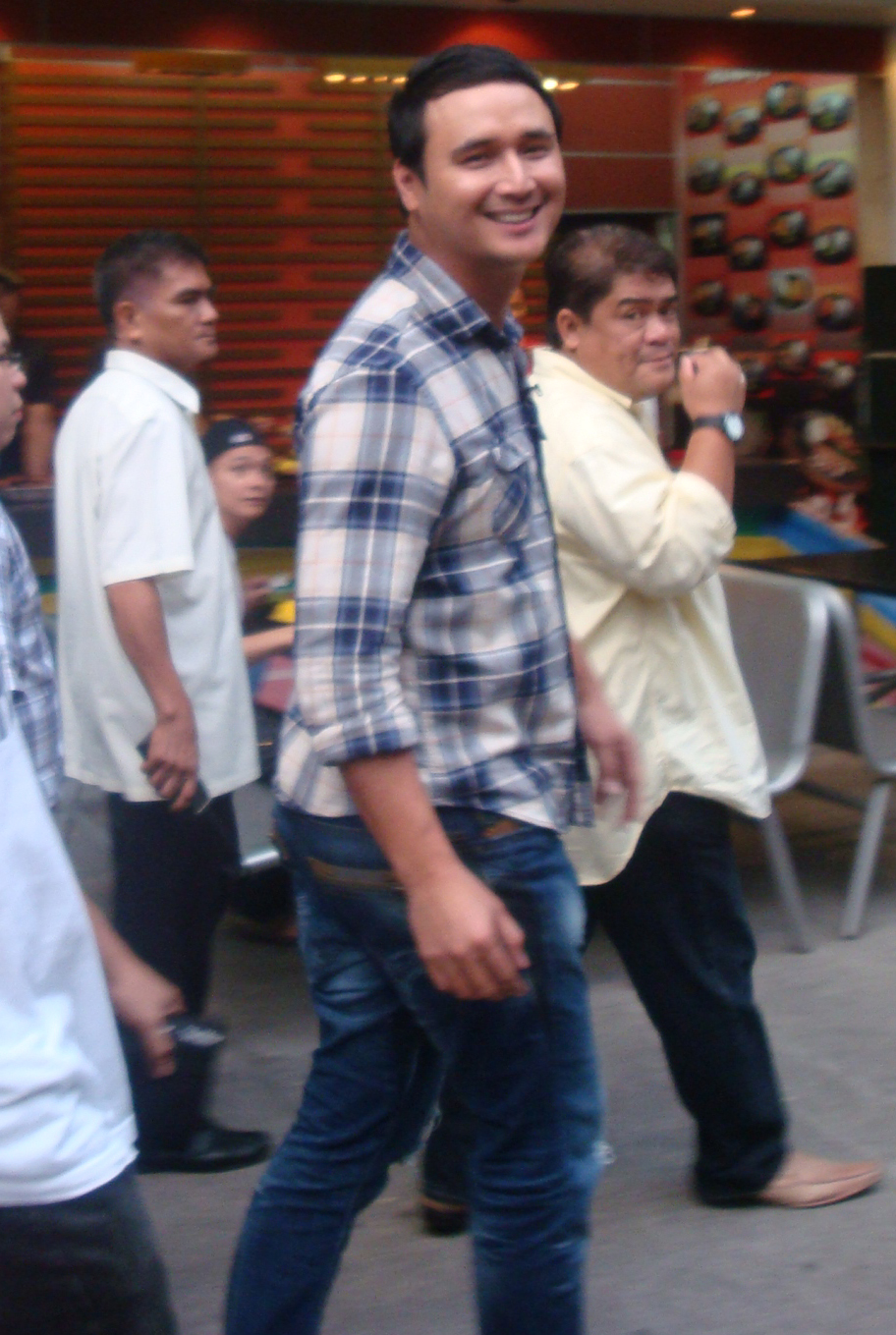
John Estrada has been nominated once for his role in 2008's Caregiver.

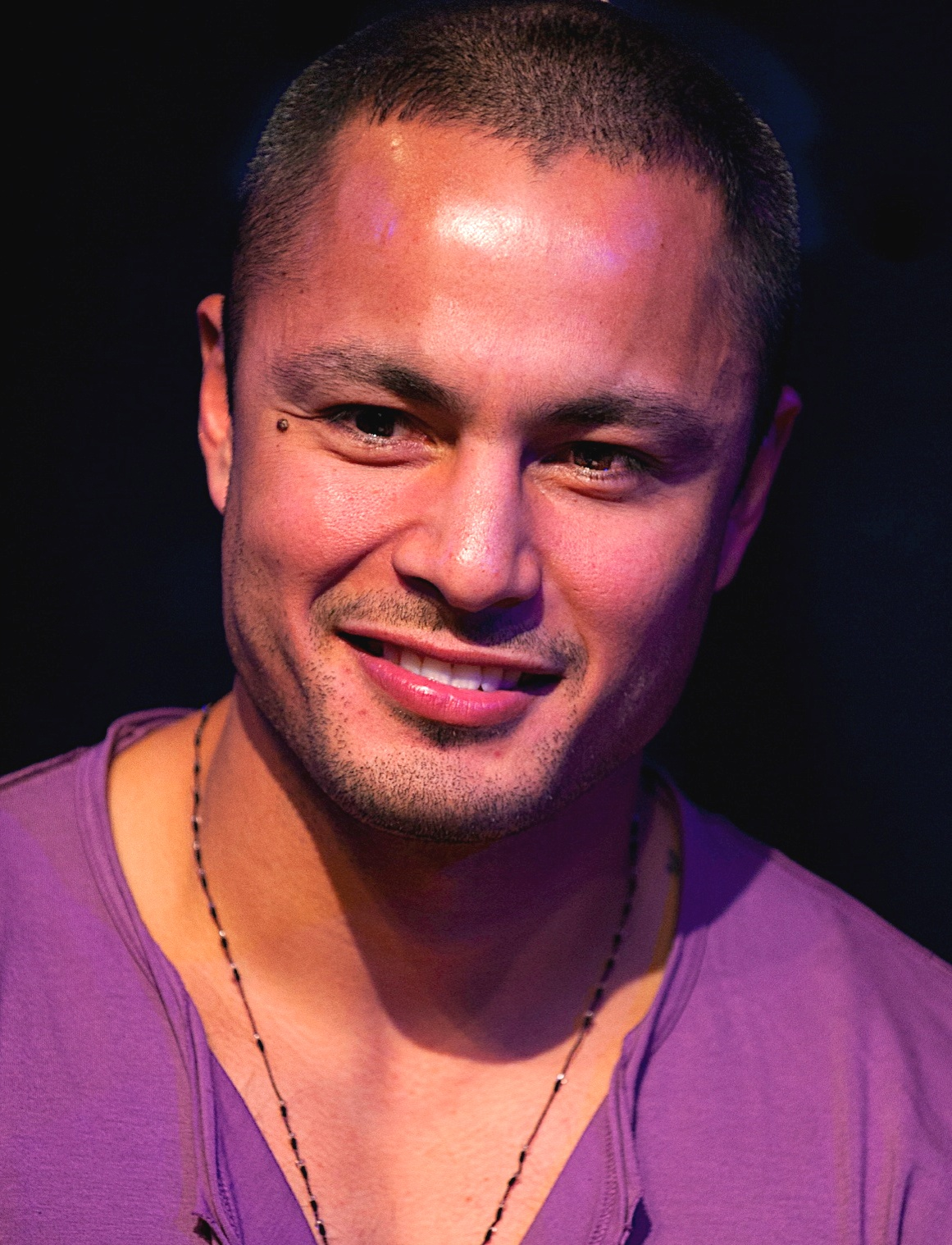
Derek Ramsay has been nominated thrice for his roles in 2011's No Other Woman, 2012's A Secret Affair and 2014's English Only, Please.

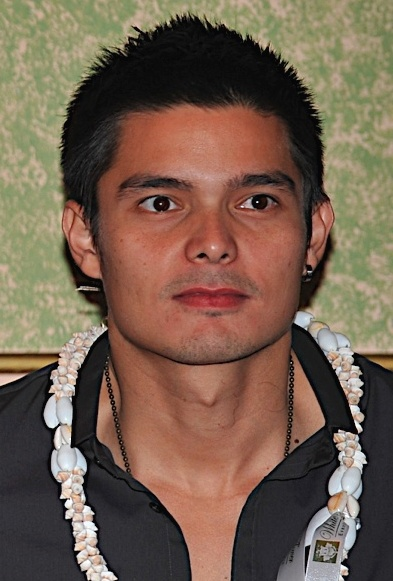
Dingdong Dantes has been nominated thrice for his roles in 2011's Segunda Mano, 2012's One More Try and 2013's She's the One.

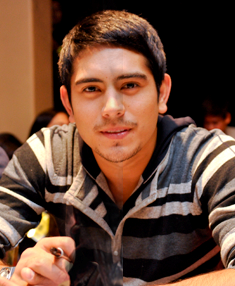
Gerald Anderson has been nominated once for his role in 2013's On the Job.

The list may be incomplete such as some of the names of the nominees and the roles portrayed especially during the early years of FAMAS Awards.

In the lists below, the winner of the award for each year is shown first, followed by the other nominees.

‡ – indicates the winner

=== 1950s ===
Year	Actor	Film	Role
1952 (1st)	Ben Perez‡	Ang Bagong Umaga	Orang
1953 (2nd)	José Padilla Jr.‡	Huk sa Bagong Pamumuhay	Carding
1954 (3rd)	Fred Montilla‡	Bondying	Bondying
1955 (4th)			
1955 (4th)	Rogelio de la Rosa‡	Higit sa Lahat	Roberto
1955 (4th)	Eddie del Mar	Bandilang Pula	
1955 (4th)	José Padilla Jr.	Dakilang Judas	
1955 (4th)	José Padilla Jr.	Paltik	
1955 (4th)	Danilo Montes	Sanda Wong	
1956 (5th)
1956 (5th)	Eddie del Mar‡	Ang Buhay at Pag-ibig ni Jose Rizal	Jose Rizal
1956 (5th)	Efren Reyes Sr.	Desperado	
1956 (5th)	Ruben Rustia	Haring Tulisan	
1956 (5th)	Jaime de la Rosa	Kumander 13	
1956 (5th)	Armando Goyena	Medalyang Perlas	
1957 (6th)
1957 (6th)	Van de Leon‡	Taga sa Bato	
1957 (6th)	Danilo Montes	Kalibre .45	
1957 (6th)	Efren Reyes Sr.	Kalibre .45	
1957 (6th)	Jose Padilla Jr.	Objective: Patayin si Magsaysay	
1957 (6th)	Rogelio de la Rosa	Veronica	
1958 (7th)
1958 (7th)	Pancho Magalona‡	Hanggang sa Dulo ng Daigdig	
1958 (7th)	Luis Gonzales	Alaala Kita	
1958 (7th)	Fred Montilla	Bobby	Bobby
1958 (7th)	Romeo Vasquez	Bobby	
1958 (7th)	Van de León	Condenado	
1958 (7th)	Eddie del Mar	Impyerno sa Paraiso	
1958 (7th)	Fernando Poe Jr.	Laban sa Lahat	
1958 (7th)	Mario Montenegro	Rebelde	
1958 (7th)	Luis Gonzales	Talipandas	
1959 (8th)
1959 (8th)	Van de Leon‡	Kamandag	
1959 (8th)	Leroy Salvador	Biyaya ng Lupa	Miguel
1959 (8th)	Tony Santos	Biyaya ng Lupa	Jose
1959 (8th)	Pancho Magalona	Cry Freedom	Marking
1959 (8th)	Johnny Montiero	Ang Matatapang Lamang	
1959 (8th)	Efren Reyes Sr.	Ang Maton	

=== 1960s ===
Year	Actor	Film	Role
1960 (9th)			
1960 (9th)	Efren Reyes Sr.‡	Kadenang Putik	
1960 (9th)	Ronald Remy	Akin ang Paghihiganti	
1960 (9th)	Van de León	Gumuhong Bantayog	
1960 (9th)	César Ramírez	Huwag Mo Akong Limutin	Arturo
1960 (9th)	Fernando Poe Jr.	Walang Daigdig	
1961 (10th)
1961 (10th)	Leopoldo Salcedo‡	The Moises Padilla Story	Moises Padilla
1961 (10th)	Efren Reyes Sr.	Alaala Kita	
1961 (10th)	Eddie del Mar	Noli Me Tangere	Crisostomo Ibarra
1961 (10th)	Ronald Remy	Pusong Bakal	Esteban
1961 (10th)	Nestor De Villa	Mga Yapak na Walang Bakas	
1962 (11th)
1962 (11th)	Joseph Estrada‡	Markang Rehas	
1962 (11th)	Fernando Poe Jr.	Ako ang Katarungan	
1962 (11th)	Berting Labra	Ano ba Choy	
1962 (11th)	Pancho Magalona	El Filibusterismo	Simoun
1962 (11th)	Romeo Vasquez	Pitong Kabanalan ng Isang Makasalanan	
1962 (11th)	Eddie del Mar	Sino ang Matapang	
1962 (11th)	César Ramírez	Suicide Susy	
1962 (11th)	Fernando Poe Jr.	Walang Pagkalupig	
1963 (12th)
1963 (12th)	Eddie Rodriguez‡	Sapagkat Kami'y Tao Lamang	
1963 (12th)	Van de Leon	3 Mukha ni Pandora	
1963 (12th)	Joseph Estrada	Ito ang Maynila	
1963 (12th)	Fred Montilla	The Arsenio Lacson Story	Arsenio Lacson
1963 (12th)	Nestor de Villa	Naku... Yabang!	
1963 (12th)	Robert Arevalo	Sa Atin ang Daigdig	
1963 (12th)	Eddie Mesa	Sa Atin ang Daigdig	
1963 (12th)	Fernando Poe Jr.	Sigaw ng Digmaan	
1963 (12th)	Juancho Gutierez	Tres Kantos	
1963 (12th)	George Nader	Zigzag	
1964 (13th)
1964 (13th)	Joseph Estrada	Geron Busabos: Ang Batang Quiapo	Geron Busabos
1964 (13th)	Ronald Remy	Kulay Dugo ang Gabi	Dr. Marco
1964 (13th)	Zaldy Zshornack	Sa Bawat Pintig ng Puso	
1964 (13th)	Eddie Rodriguez	Salambao	
1964 (13th)	William Sotelo	Scout Rangers	
1965 (14th)
1965 (14th)	Robert Arevalo‡	Ang Daigdig ng mga Api	
1965 (14th)	Amado Cortez	Dugo sa Pantalan	
1965 (14th)	Van de Leon	Maria Cecilia	
1965 (14th)	Luis Gonzales	Iginuhit ng Tadhana: The Ferdinand E. Marcos Story	Ferdinand Marcos
1965 (14th)	Eddie Rodriguez	Mila Rosa	
1965 (14th)	Dindo Fernando	Paalam sa Kahapon	
1965 (14th)	Fernando Poe Jr.	Pilipinas kong Mahal	
1965 (14th)	Joseph Estrada	Sapang Palay	
1965 (14th)	Conrad Parham	A Portrait of the Artist as Filipino	
1965 (14th)	Romeo Vasquez	Sapagkat Ikaw ay Akin	
1966 (15th)
1966 (15th)	Joseph Estrada‡	Ito ang Pilipino	Tomas Ronquillo
1966 (15th)	Ronald Remy	Flight of the Sparrow	
1966 (15th)	Efren Reyes Jr.	Dugo ang Kulay ng Pag-ibig	
1966 (15th)	Eddie Rodriguez	Ang Iniluluha ko'y Dugo	
1966 (15th)	Michael Parsons	The Passionate Strangers	Adam Courtney
1966 (15th)	Tony Ferrer	Sabotage	Tony Falcon/Agent X44
1967 (16th)
1967 (16th)	Fernando Poe Jr.‡	Mga Alabok sa Lupa	
1967 (16th)	Ric Rodrigo	Dahil sa Isang Bulaklak	Edilberto
1967 (16th)	Eddie Rodriguez	Kapag Puso'y Nasugatan	
1967 (16th)	Dolphy	Like Father, Like Son: Kung Ano ang Puno Siya ang Bunga	
1967 (16th)	Romeo Vasquez	Maruja	Gabriel
1968 (17th)
1968 (17th)	Eddie Garcia‡	De Colores	
1968 (17th)	Dolphy	Artista ang Aking Asawa	
1968 (17th)	Fernando Poe Jr.	Barbaro Cristobal	Barbaro Cristobal
1968 (17th)	Joseph Estrada	Galo Gimbal	
1968 (17th)	Ric Rodrigo	Igorota	Albert
1968 (17th)	Eddie Rodriguez	Kasalanan Kaya?	Luis Enriquez
1968 (17th)	Vic Vargas	Kasalanan Kaya?	
1968 (17th)	Dindo Fernando	Psycho Maniac	
1968 (17th)	Nestor De Villa	Siete Dolores	
1968 (17th)	Max Alvarado	Tatak: Sacramentados	
1969 (18th)
1969 (18th)	Joseph Estrada‡	Dugo ng Bayani	
1969 (18th)	Dante Rivero	Adriana	Renante
1969 (18th)	Eddie Rodriguez	Ikaw	
1969 (18th)	Dolphy	Pagibig, Masdan Mo ang Ginawa Mo	
1969 (18th)	Vic Vargas	Perlas ng Silangan	
1969 (18th)	Luis Gonzales	Pinagbuklod ng Pag-ibig	

=== 1970s ===
Year	Actor	Film	Role
1970 (19th)
1970 (19th)	Eddie Garcia‡	Tubog sa Ginto	Don Benito
1970 (19th)	Eddie Rodriguez	My Little Angel	
1970 (19th)	George Estregan	Psycho Sex Killer	
1970 (19th)	Fernando Poe Jr.	Santiago	Gonzalo
1970 (19th)	Dante Rivero	Wanted: Perfect Mother	Dante
1971 (20th)
1971 (20th)	Fernando Poe Jr.‡	Asedillo	Teodoro Asedillo
1971 (20th)	Romy Diaz	Buhay na Manika	
1971 (20th)	Joseph Estrada	Hukom Bitay	
1971 (20th)	Tony Ferrer	I Love Mama, I Love Papa	
1971 (20th)	Eddie Garcia	Lumuluha Pati Mga Anghel	Asyong
1971 (20th)	Dindo Fernando	Ang Uliran	
1971 (20th)	Ray Marcos	Verde	
1972 (21st)
1972 (21st)	George Estregan‡	Sukdulan	
1972 (21st)	Fernando Poe Jr.	Ang Alamat	Daniel
1972 (21st)	Eddie Rodriguez	Babae...Ikaw ang Dahilan	
1972 (21st)	Jun Aristorenas	Elias, Basilio at Sisa	Elias
1972 (21st)	Joseph Estrada	Kill the Pushers	
1972 (21st)	Ramon Revilla	Nardong Putik	Nardong Putik
1972 (21st)	Dante Rivero	Villa Miranda	
1973 (22nd)
1973 (22nd)	Ramon Revilla‡	Hulihin si Tiagong Akyat	Tiagong Akyat
1973 (22nd)	Joseph Estrada	Erap is my Guy	Erap
1973 (22nd)	Zaldy Zshornack	Hindi na Sisikat ang Araw	
1973 (22nd)	Eddie Rodriguez	Lalaki, Kasalanan Mo	
1973 (22nd)	Ramon Zamora	Ang Mahiwagang Daigdig ni Pedro Penduko	Pedro Penduko
1973 (22nd)	Vic Vargas	Nueva Vizcaya	
1973 (22nd)	Dindo Fernando	Panic	
1974 (23rd)
1974 (23rd)	Christopher de Leon‡	Tinimbang ka Ngunit Kulang	Junior
1974 (23rd)	Eddie Rodriguez	Alaala Mo, Daigdig Ko	
1974 (23rd)	Ronaldo Valdez	Fe, Esperanza, Caridad	Rodrigo
1974 (23rd)	Dolphy	John en Marsha	John Puruntong
1974 (23rd)	Jun Raquiza'	Krimen: Kayo ang Humatol	
1974 (23rd)	Joseph Estrada	Manila Connection	
1974 (23rd)	Lito Anzures	Ang Pinakamagandang Hayop sa Balat ng Lupa	
1974 (23rd)	Vic Vargas	Huwag Tularan: Pito ang Asawa Ko	Douglas
1974 (23rd)	Ramon Revilla	Sunugin ang Samar	
1974 (23rd)	George Estregan	Ugat	
1975 (24th)
1975 (24th)	Bembol Roco‡	Maynila... Sa Kuko ng Liwanang	Julio Madiaga
1975 (24th)	Christopher de Leon	Banaue: Stairway to the Sky	Sadek
1975 (24th)	Dante Rivero	Lumapit, Lumayo ang Umaga	
1975 (24th)	George Estregan	Lumapit, Lumayo ang Umaga	
1975 (24th)	Eddie Garcia	Mister Mo, Lover Boy ko	
1976 (25th)
1976 (25th)	Christopher de Leon‡	Ganito Kami Noon, Paano Kayo Ngayon	Nicolas "Kulas" Ocampo
1976 (25th)	Rudy Fernandez	Bitayin si... Baby Ama!	Baby Ama
1976 (25th)	Vic Silayan	Mga Ligaw na Bulaklak	
1976 (25th)	Dindo Fernando	May Langit ang Bawat nilikha	
1976 (25th)	Tommy Abuel	Putik ka man, Sa Alabok Magbalik	
1977 (26th)
1977 (26th)	Dolphy‡	Omeng Satanasia	Omeng / Satanasia / Gregory / Angelito
1977 (26th)	Joseph Estrada	Bakya mo Neneng	
1977 (26th)	George Estregan	Hostage: Hanapin si Batuigas	
1977 (26th)	Christopher de Leon	Masarap, Masakit ang Umibig	
1977 (26th)	Bembol Roco	Sa Piling ng mga Sugapa	
1978 (27th)
1978 (27th)	Matt Ranillo III‡	Isang Ama, Dalawang Ina	
1978 (27th)	Dolphy	Ang Tatay kong Nanay	Dioscoro Derecho / Coring
1978 (27th)	Rudy Fernandez	Anak sa Una, Kasal sa Ina	
1978 (27th)	Christopher de Leon	Lagi na Lamang ba Akong Babae?	Desto
1979 (28th)
1979 (28th)	Fernando Poe Jr.‡	Durugin si Totoy Bato	Totoy Bato
1979 (28th)	Christopher de Leon	Ang Alamat ni Julian Makabayan	Julian Makabayan
1979 (28th)	Anthony Alonzo	Dakpin si Junior Bumbay	Junior Bumbay
1979 (28th)	Ernie Garcia	Pagmamahal mo Buhay Ko	
1979 (28th)	Rudy Fernandez	Star	

=== 1980s ===
Year	Actor	Film	Role
1980 (29th)
1980 (29th)	Dindo Fernando‡	Langis at Tubig	Bobby Jarlego
1980 (29th)	Christopher de Leon	Aguila	Mari
1980 (29th)	Joseph Estrada	Hoy, Tukso Layuan mo Ako	
1980 (29th)	Jay Ilagan	Brutal	Tato
1980 (29th)	Christopher de Leon	Taga sa Panahon	
1981 (30th)
1981 (30th)	Joseph Estrada‡	Kumander Alibasbas	Cesario Manarang / Kumander Alibasbas
1981 (30th)	Fernando Poe Jr.	Ang Maestro	Hernan de Zuniga
1981 (30th)	Anthony Alonzo	Hulihin si Pepeng Magtanggol	Pepeng Magtanggol
1981 (30th)	Christopher de Leon	Pakawalan Mo Ako	Freddie
1981 (30th)	Vic Silayan	Kisapmata	Sgt. Diosdado Carandang
1981 (30th)	Rudy Fernandez	Pepeng Shotgun	Pepe Medrano
1981 (30th)	Dolphy	Titser's Pet	
1982 (31st)
1982 (31st)	Anthony Alonzo‡	Bambang	
1982 (31st)	Phillip Salvador	Cain at Abel	Lorenzo
1982 (31st)	Dindo Fernando	Gaano Kadalas ang Minsan	Louie
1982 (31st)	George Estregan	Lalake Ako	
1982 (31st)	Dolphy	My Heart Belongs to Daddy	
1982 (31st)	Fernando Poe Jr.	Ang Panday: Ikatlong Yugto	Flavio / Panday
1983 (32nd)
1983 (32nd)	Fernando Poe Jr. (tied)‡	Umpisahan mo...Tatapusin ko	
1983 (32nd)	Eddie Garcia (tied)‡	Minsan pa nating Hagkan ang Nakaraan	Cenon
1983 (32nd)	Anthony Alonzo	Bago Kumalat ang Kamandag	
1983 (32nd)	Christopher de Leon	Broken Marriage	Rene
1983 (32nd)	Phillip Salvador	Karnal	Narcing
1983 (32nd)	Ace Vergel	Pieta	Rigor
1983 (32nd)	Rudy Fernandez	Sumuko ka na Ronquillo	Ronquillo
1984 (33rd)
1984 (33rd)	Rudy Fernandez‡	Pasukuin si Waway	Waway
1984 (33rd)	Phillip Salvador	Baby Tsina	Roy
1984 (33rd)	Ace Vergel	Basag ang Pula	Fernando
1984 (33rd)	Chiquito	Lovingly Yours, Helen (The Movie)	Batibot / Caloy
1984 (33rd)	Bong Revilla	Pieta: Ikalawang Aklat	Noel
1984 (33rd)	Fernando Poe Jr.	Sigaw ng Katarungan	Alfredo Javier
1985 (34th)
1985 (34th)	Phillip Salvador‡	Bayan ko: Kapit sa patalim	Arturo
1985 (34th)	Christopher de Leon	God Save Me	
1985 (34th)	Ace Vergel	Bomba Arienda	Roger 'Bomba' Arienda
1985 (34th)	Eddie Garcia	Miguelito: Batang Rebelde	Ven Herrera
1985 (34th)	Anthony Alonzo	Moises Padilla Story: The Missing Chapter	Moises Padilla
1985 (34th)	Fernando Poe Jr.	Partida	Ben Serrano
1985 (34th)	Dindo Fernando	Muling Buksan ang Puso	Jim
1986 (35th)
1986 (35th)	Fernando Poe Jr.‡	Muslim .357	Lt. Jamal
1986 (35th)	Ramon Revilla	Cordillera	
1986 (35th)	Phillip Salvador	Gabi na, Kumander	
1986 (35th)	Rudy Fernandez	Lumuhod ka sa Lupa	Norman
1986 (35th)	Edu Manzano	Palimos ng Pag-ibig	Rodel Alcaraz
1986 (35th)	Joel Torre	Unfaithful Wife	Fidel
1986 (35th)	Richard Gomez	Tuklaw	
1987 (36th)
1987 (36th)	Rudy Fernandez‡	Operation: Get Victor Corpuz, the Rebel Soldier	Victor Corpuz
1987 (36th)	Phillip Salvador	Balweg: The Rebel Priest	Father Conrado Balweg
1987 (36th)	Christopher de Leon	Maging Akin ka Lamang	Andy Abrigo
1987 (36th)	Dolphy	Once Upon a Time	Puga
1987 (36th)	Tonton Gutierrez	Saan Nagtatago ang Pag-ibig?	Val
1988 (37th)
1988 (37th)	Christopher de Leon‡	Kapag Napagod ang Puso	
1988 (37th)	Ace Vergel	Anak ng Cabron	Donato Rios
1988 (37th)	Phillip Salvador	Boy Negro	Boy Negro
1988 (37th)	Bong Revilla	Chinatown	
1988 (37th)	Ricky Davao	Huwag Mong Itanong Kung Bakit	Dante Cuevas
1988 (37th)	Matt Ranillo III	Lorenzo Ruiz... The Saint... A Filipino	Lorenzo Ruiz
1988 (37th)	Rudy Fernandez	Sandakot na Bala	
1989 (38th)
1989 (38th)	Tirso Cruz III‡	Bilangin ang Bituin sa Langit	Dr. Anselmo Santos/Anselmo Santos Jr
1989 (38th)	Rudy Fernandez	Ipaglalaban Ko	
1989 (38th)	Bong Revilla	Florencio Diño: Public Enemy No. 1 of Caloocan	Florencio Diño
1989 (38th)	Christopher de Leon	Imortal	
1989 (38th)	Phillip Salvador	Joe Pring: Homicide Manila Police	Joe Pring
1989 (38th)	Jestoni Alarcon	Ang Lihim Ng Golden Buddha	Rogelio Roxas
1989 (38th)	Ronnie Ricketts	Tatak Ng Isang Api	Geron

=== 1990s ===
Year	Actor	Film	Role
1990 (39th)
1990 (39th)	Christopher de Leon‡	My Other Woman	
1990 (39th)	Phillip Salvador	Angel Molave	Angel Molave
1990 (39th)	Robin Padilla	Barumbado	Eric
1990 (39th)	Ronnie Ricketts	Isa-isahin Ko Kayo	Daniel
1990 (39th)	Rudy Fernandez	Kaaway ng Batas	Lt. Bobby Sandoval
1991 (40th)
1991 (40th)	Christopher de Leon‡	Ipagpatawad Mo	Mike
1991 (40th)	Eddie Garcia	Boyong Mañalac: Hoodlum Terminator	Boyong Mañalac
1991 (40th)	Edu Manzano	Contreras Gang	Mario Contreras
1991 (40th)	Gabby Concepcion	Una Kang Naging Akin	Nicolas Soriano Adriano III / Darwin
1991 (40th)	Rudy Fernandez	Bingbong: The Vincent Crisologo Story	Vincent "Bingbong" Crisologo
1992 (41st)
1992 (41st)	Aga Muhlach‡	Sinungaling Mong Puso	Jason
1992 (41st)	Julio Diaz	Bayani	Andres Bonifacio
1992 (41st)	Phillip Salvador	Lucio Margallo	Lucio Margallo
1992 (41st)	Richard Gomez	Ikaw Pa Lang ang Minahal	David
1992 (41st)	Romnick Sarmenta	Sa Aking Puso: The Marcos 'Bong' Manalang Story	Marcos 'Bong' Manalang
1993 (42nd)
1993 (42nd)	Phillip Salvador‡	Masahol Pa sa Hayop	Cpt. Tomas Padilla
1993 (42nd)	Aga Muhlach	May Minamahal	Carlitos
1993 (42nd)	Cesar Montano	Leonardo Delos Reyes: Alyas Waway	Leonardo Delos Reyes
1993 (42nd)	Julio Diaz	Sakay	Gen. Macario Sakay
1993 (42nd)	Rudy Fernandez	Tumbasan Mo ng Buhay	Victor Medrano
1994 (43rd)
1994 (43rd)	Bong Revilla‡	Relaks Ka Lang, Sagot Kita	Daniel Santiago
1994 (43rd)	Cesar Montano	The Cecilia Masagca Story: Antipolo Massacre (Jesus Save Us!)	Winifredo Masagca
1994 (43rd)	Joel Torre	Lipa 'Arandia' Massacre: Lord, Deliver Us from Evil	Ronald Arandia
1994 (43rd)	Richard Gomez	Maalala Mo Kaya: The Movie	Mike
1994 (43rd)	Roi Vinzon	Lucas Abelardo	Lucas Abelardo
1995 (44th)
1995 (44th)	Richard Gomez‡	Dahas	Jake
1995 (44th)	Aga Muhlach	Sana Maulit Muli	Jerry
1995 (44th)	Dolphy	Father & Son	Johnny
1995 (44th)	Phillip Salvador	Pamilya Valderama	
1995 (44th)	Rudy Fernandez	Matimbang Pa sa Dugo	Carlos
1996 (45th)
1996 (45th)	Eddie Garcia‡	Bakit May Kahapon Pa?	Gen. Valderama
1996 (45th)	Aga Muhlach	Bayarang Puso	Martin Villanueva
1996 (45th)	Cesar Montano	Utol	Jaime
1996 (45th)	Edu Manzano	Ama, Ina, Anak	Santi Alvarez
1996 (45th)	Phillip Salvador	Hangga't May Hininga	Ellis
1997 (46th)
1997 (46th)	Phillip Salvador‡	Bobby Barbers: Parak	Bobby Barbers
1997 (46th)	Albert Martinez	Rizal sa Dapitan	Jose Rizal
1997 (46th)	Christopher De Leon	Nasaan Ang Puso	Dave
1997 (46th)	Eddie Garcia	NBI: The Mariano Mison Story	Mariano Mison
1997 (46th)	Richard Gomez	Hanggang Kailan Kita Mamahalin	Mike Reyes
1997 (46th)	Wowie De Guzman	Paano Ang Puso Ko?	Ruben
1998 (47th)
1998 (47th)	Cesar Montano‡	Jose Rizal	Jose Rizal
1998 (47th)	Eddie Garcia	Sambahin Ang Ngalan Mo	Don Ramon
1998 (47th)	Eric Quizon	Pusong Mamon	Nick
1998 (47th)	Romnick Sarmenta	Miguel/Michelle	Miguel/Michelle de la Cruz
1998 (47th)	Rudy Fernandez	Birador	Mike Santana
1999 (48th)
1999 (48th)	Albert Martinez‡	Sidhi	Miguel
1999 (48th)	Aga Muhlach	Dahil May Isang Ikaw	Andrew Castro
1999 (48th)	Bong Revilla	Alyas Pogi: Ang Pagbabalik	Henry
1999 (48th)	Cesar Montano	Muro Ami	Fredo
1999 (48th)	Ricky Davao	The Kite	Homer

=== 2000s ===
Year	Actor	Film	Role
2000 (49th)
2000 (49th)	Johnny Delgado‡	Tanging Yaman	Danny
2000 (49th)	Albert Martinez	Ika-13 Kapitulo	Cesar Nero
2000 (49th)	Cogie Domingo	Deathrow	Sonny
2000 (49th)	Dante Rivero	Azucena	Teban
2000 (49th)	Dolphy	Markova: Comfort Gay	Walter Dempster Jr./Walterina Markova
2001 (50th)
2001 (50th)	Armando Goyena‡	Yamashita: The Tiger's Treasure	Carmelo Rosales/Lolo Melo
2001 (50th)	Albert Martinez	Abakada...Ina	Daniel
2001 (50th)	Cesar Montano	Bagong Buwan	Ahmad Ibn Ismael
2001 (50th)	Edu Manzano	Tatarin	Don Paeng
2001 (50th)	Jomari Yllana	In the Bosom of the Enemy	Diego
2002 (51st)
2002 (51st)	Eddie Garcia‡	Bahid	Lorenzo Lavares
2002 (51st)	Fernando Poe Jr.	Batas ng Lansangan	Major Ruben Medrano
2002 (51st)	Rico Yan	Got 2 Believe	Lorenz Montinola
2003 (52nd)
2003 (52nd)	Jay Manalo‡	Bayarán	Jake
2003 (52nd)	Aga Muhlach	Kung Ako na Lang Sana	Vince
2003 (52nd)	Cesar Montano	Chavit	Chavit Singson
2003 (52nd)	Eric Quizon	Crying Ladies	Wilson Chua
2003 (52nd)	Richard Gomez	Filipinas	Samuel Filipinas
2004 (53rd)
2004 (53rd)	Piolo Pascual‡	Milan	Lino
2004 (53rd)	Aga Muhlach	All My Life	Sam
2004 (53rd)	Cesar Montano	Panaghoy Sa Suba	Duroy
2004 (53rd)	Yul Servo	Naglalayag	Noah Garcia
2005 (54th)
2005 (54th)	Robin Padilla‡	La Visa Loca	Jess Huson
2005 (54th)	Aga Muhlach	Dubai	Raffy
2005 (54th)	Jericho Rosales	Nasaan Ka Man	Joven
2005 (54th)	Marvin Agustin	Kutob	Lemuel
2005 (54th)	Ricky Davao	Mga Pusang Gala	Boyet
2006 (55th)
2006 (55th)	Cesar Montano‡	Ligalig	Junior
2006 (55th)	Jericho Rosales	Pacquiao: The Movie	Manny Pacquiao
2006 (55th)	Johnny Delgado	Summer Heat	Mang Rudy
2006 (55th)	Piolo Pascual	Don't Give Up on Us	Vince
2006 (55th)	Ryan Agoncillo	Umaaraw, Umuulan	Paolo
2007 (56th)
2007 (56th)	Jinggoy Estrada‡	Katas ng Saudi	Oca
2007 (56th)	Aga Muhlach	A Love Story	Ian Montes
2007 (56th)	Bong Revilla	Resiklo	Commander Crisval Sarmiento
2007 (56th)	John Lloyd Cruz	One More Chance	Popoy
2007 (56th)	Piolo Pascual	Paano Kita Iibigin	Lance Monteagundo
2008 (57th)
2008 (57th)	Allen Dizon‡	Paupahan	Tonio Torres
2008 (57th)	Aga Muhlach	When Love Begins	Benedicto "Ben" Caballero
2008 (57th)	Jericho Rosales	Baler	Celso Resureccion
2008 (57th)	John Estrada	Caregiver	Theodore "Teddy" Gonzales
2008 (57th)	Polo Ravales	Walang Kawala	Joaquin
2008 (57th)	Richard Gutierrez	For The First Time	Seth Alexander Villaraza
2009 (58th)
2009 (58th)	Allen Dizon‡	Dukot	Junix Etrata
2009 (58th)	Bong Revilla	Ang Panday	Flavio
2009 (58th)	Coco Martin	Kinatay	Peping
2009 (58th)	Gabby Concepcion	I Love You, Goodbye	Dr. Adrian Benitez
2009 (58th)	John Lloyd Cruz	In My Life	Noel Villanueva
2009 (58th)	John Lloyd Cruz	You Changed My Life	Miguel "Miggy" Montenegro
2009 (58th)	Piolo Pascual	Love Me Again (Land Down Under)	Migo

=== 2010s ===
Year	Actor	Film	Role
2010 (59th)
2010 (59th)	John Lloyd Cruz‡	Miss You like Crazy	Allan Alvarez
2010 (59th)	Bong Revilla	Si Agimat at si Enteng Kabisote	Agimat
2010 (59th)	Coco Martin	Noy	Manolo "Noy" Agapito
2010 (59th)	Dennis Trillo	Rosario	Alberto Fernandez
2010 (59th)	Tirso Cruz III	Sigwa	Oliver
2010 (59th)	Vic Sotto	Si Agimat at si Enteng Kabisote	Enteng Kabisote
2011 (60th)
2011 (60th)	ER Ejercito‡	Manila Kingpin: The Asiong Salonga Story	Nicasio "Asiong" Salonga
2011 (60th)	Aga Muhlach	In the Name of Love	Emman Toledo/Garry Fernandez
2011 (60th)	Bong Revilla	Ang Panday 2	Flavio
2011 (60th)	Derek Ramsay	No Other Woman	Ram Escaler
2011 (60th)	Dingdong Dantes	Segunda Mano	Ivan
2011 (60th)	Nonie Buencamino	A Mother's Story	Gerry Santos
2011 (60th)	TJ Trinidad	The Road	Luis
2012 (61st)
2012 (61st)	ER Ejercito‡	El Presidente	Gen. Emilio Aguinaldo
2012 (61st)	Bong Revilla	Si Agimat, si Enteng Kabisote at si Ako	Agimat
2012 (61st)	Coco Martin	Sta. Niña	Pol
2012 (61st)	Derek Ramsay	A Secret Affair	Anton
2012 (61st)	Dingdong Dantes	One More Try	Edward Mendoza
2012 (61st)	Jericho Rosales	Alagwa	Robert Lim
2012 (61st)	John Lloyd Cruz	The Mistress	Eric "JD" Torres
2012 (61st)	Vic Sotto	Si Agimat, si Enteng Kabisote at si Ako	Enteng Kabisote
2013 (62nd)
2013 (62nd)	ER Ejercito‡	Boy Golden: Shoot to Kill, the Arturo Porcuna Story	Arturo "Boy Golden" Porcuna
2013 (62nd)	Coco Martin	A Moment in Time	Patrick Javier
2013 (62nd)	Daniel Padilla	Pagpag: Siyam na Buhay	Cedrick
2013 (62nd)	Dingdong Dantes	She's The One	Wacky
2013 (62nd)	Gerald Anderson	On the Job	Daniel Benitez
2013 (62nd)	John Lloyd Cruz	It Takes A Man And A Woman	Miguel "Miggy" Montenegro
2013 (62nd)	Piolo Pascual	On the Job	Atty. Francis Coronel, Jr
2013 (62nd)	Robin Padilla	10,000 Hours	Gabriel Molino Alcaraz
2013 (62nd)	Vic Sotto	My Little Bossings	Victor "Torky" Villanueva
2013 (62nd)	Xian Lim	Bakit Hindi Ka Crush Ng Crush Mo?	Alex Prieto
2014 (63rd)
2014 (63rd)	Allen Dizon‡	Magkakabaung	Randy
2014 (63rd)	Allen Dizon	Kamkam	Johnny
2014 (63rd)	Coco Martin	Feng Shui 2	Lester Añonuevo
2014 (63rd)	Daniel Padilla	She's Dating the Gangster	Kenji Delos Reyes / Kenneth Delos Reyes
2014 (63rd)	Derek Ramsay	English Only, Please	Julian Parker
2014 (63rd)	ER Ejercito	Magnum Muslim .357	Lt. Jamal
2014 (63rd)	Jake Vargas	Asintado	Tonio
2014 (63rd)	John Lloyd Cruz	The Trial	Ronald Jimenez Jr.
2014 (63rd)	Piolo Pascual	Starting Over Again	Marco Antonio Villanueva III
2014 (63rd)	Robin Padilla	Bonifacio: Ang Unang Pangulo	Andres Bonifacio
2014 (63rd)	Rocco Nacino	Hustisya	Atty. Gerald
2015 (64th)
2015 (64th)	Dennis Trillo‡	Felix Manalo	Felix Y. Manalo
2015 (64th)	Coco Martin	You're My Boss	Pong Dalupan
2015 (64th)	Daniel Padilla	Crazy Beautiful You	Kiko Alcantara
2015 (64th)	Francisco Guinto	Ari: My Life With A King	Conrado 'Kong Dado' Guinto (aka King)
2015 (64th)	James Reid	Para sa Hopeless Romantic	Nikko John Borja
2015 (64th)	John Estrada	Tragic Theater	Fr. Nilo Marcelo
2015 (64th)	John Lloyd Cruz	A Second Chance	Engr. Rodolfo "Popoy" Gonzales Jr.
2015 (64th)	Paolo Contis	Angela Markado	Gang Leader / Rapist
2015 (64th)	Piolo Pascual	Silong	Miguel Cascarro
2015 (64th)	Richard Gomez	The Love Affair	Dr. Vince Ramos
2016 (65th)
2016 (65th)	Daniel Padilla‡	Barcelona: A Love Untold	Elias Antonio
2016 (65th)	Dingdong Dantes	The Unmarried Wife	Geoff Victorio
2016 (65th)	Joshua Garcia	Vince and Kath and James	Michael Vincent "Vince" Arcilla
2016 (65th)	Joem Bascon	Kusina	Peles
2016 (65th)	Sandino Martin	Ringgo: The Dog Shooter	Ringgo
2017 (66th)
2017 (66th)	Allen Dizon‡	Bomba	Pipo
2017 (66th)	Abra	Respeto	Hendrix
2017 (66th)	Bembol Roco	What Home Feels Like	Antonio
2017 (66th)	Dingdong Dantes	Seven Sundays	Bryan "Bry" Bonifacio
2017 (66th)	Jojit Lorenzo	Changing Partners	Alex
2017 (66th)	Joshua Garcia	Love You to the Stars and Back	Caloy
2017 (66th)	Justine Samson	Balangiga: Howling Wilderness	
2017 (66th)	Noel Comia Jr.	Kiko Boksingero	
2017 (66th)	Nonie Buencamino	Smaller and Smaller Circles	Father Augusto Saenz, SJ
2017 (66th)	Timothy Castillo	Neomanila	Toto
2018 (67th)
2018 (67th)	Eddie Garcia (tied)‡	ML	Colonel dela Cruz
2018 (67th)	Victor Neri (tied)‡	A Short History of A Few Bad Things	Felix Tarongoy
2018 (67th)	Alwyn Uytingco	Asuang	
2018 (67th)	Carlo Aquino	Exes Baggage	Nix Cabangon
2018 (67th)	Christian Bables	Signal Rock	
2018 (67th)	Daniel Padilla	The Hows Of Us	Primo
2018 (67th)	Dante Rivero	Kung Paano Hinihintay Ang Dapithapon	Bene
2018 (67th)	JM De Guzman	Kung Paano Siya Nawala	Lio
2018 (67th)	James Reid	Never Not Love You	Gio Smith
2018 (67th)	Mon Confiado	El Peste	Abner
2018 (67th)	Ybes Bagadiong	Dog Days	
2019 (68th)
2019 (68th)	Elijah Canlas (tied)‡	Kalel, 15	Kalel
2019 (68th)	Kristoffer King (tied)‡	Verdict	Dante Santos
2019 (68th)	Alden Richards	Hello, Love, Goodbye	Ethan del Rosario
2019 (68th)	Gold Azeron	Metamorphosis	Adam
2019 (68th)	Jansen Magpusao	John Denver Trending	John Denver Cabungcal
2019 (68th)	Nar Cabico	Akin ang Korona	Nanong

=== 2020s ===
Year	Actor	Film	Role
2020 (69th)
2020 (69th)	Allen Dizon‡	Latay	Lando
2020 (69th)	Alfred Vargas	Tagpuan	Allan
2020 (69th)	Coco Martin	Love or Money	Leon
2020 (69th)	Elijah Canlas	He Who Is Without Sin	Martin
2020 (69th)	JC Santos	On Vodka, Beers, and Regrets	Francis
2020 (69th)	Paulo Avelino	Fan Girl	Paulo Avelino
2020 (69th)	Xian Lim	Untrue	Joachim Castro
2021 (70th)
2021 (70th)	Vince Tañada‡	Katips	Panyong
2021 (70th)	Christian Bables	Big Night!	Dharna/Panfilo Macaspac
2021 (70th)	Daniel Padilla	Kun Maupay Man It Panahon	Miguel
2021 (70th)	Dingdong Dantes	A Hard Day	Det. Edmund Villon
2021 (70th)	Jerome Ponce	Katips	Greg
2021 (70th)	Mon Confiado	Arisaka	Sonny
2022 (71st)
2022 (71st)	Noel Trinidad‡	Family Matters	Francisco Florencio
2022 (71st)	Diego Loyzaga	Greed	Tomi
2022 (71st)	Ian Veneracion	Nanahimik ang Gabi	Chief
2022 (71st)	John Arcilla	Reroute	Gemo
2022 (71st)	Paulo Avelino	Ngayon Kaya	Harold Coquia
2023 (72nd)
2023 (72nd)	Alfred Vargas (tied)‡	Pieta	Isaac Bernabe
2023 (72nd)	Piolo Pascual (tied)‡	Mallari	Juan Severino Mallari, Johnrey Mallari, Jonathan Mallari de Dios
2023 (72nd)	Alden Richards	Family of Two	Mateo
2023 (72nd)	Cedrick Juan	GomBurZa	Padre José Apolonio Burgos y García
2023 (72nd)	Dingdong Dantes	Rewind	John Nuñez
2023 (72nd)	Ken Chan	Papa Mascot	Nico
2024 (73rd)
2024 (73rd)	Arjo Atayde (tied)‡	Topakk	Miguel Vergara
2024 (73rd)	Vice Ganda (tied)‡	And the Breadwinner Is...	Bambi Salvador
2024 (73rd)	Aga Muhlach	Uninvited	Guilly Vega
2024 (73rd)	Alden Richards	Hello, Love, Again	Ethan del Rosario
2024 (73rd)	Dennis Trillo	Green Bones	Domingo Zamora
2024 (73rd)	Kelvin Miranda	Chances Are You and I	Soleil "Sol" Sikat

== Multiple awards and nominations ==
The following individuals won two or more FAMAS Awards for Best Actor:

Wins	Actor	Nominations	First Win	Latest Win
6	Eddie Garcia	12	De Colores (1968)	ML (2018)
5	Allen Dizon	6	Paupahan (2008)	Latay (2020)
5	Christopher de Leon	17	Tinimbang Ka Ngunit Kulang (1974)	Ipagpatawad Mo (1991)
5	Fernando Poe Jr.	19	Mga Alabok sa Lupa (1967)	Muslim .357 (1986)
5	Joseph Estrada	14	Markang Rehas (1962)	Kumander Alibasbas (1981)
3	E.R. Ejercito	4	Manila Kingpin: The Asiong Salonga Story (2011)	Boy Golden: Shoot to Kill (2013)
3	Phillip Salvador	14	Bayan Ko: Kapit Sa Patalim (1985)	Bobby Barkers: Parak (1997)
2	Cesar Montano	9	Jose Rizal (1998)	Ligalig (2006)
2	Piolo Pascual	8	Milan (2004)	Mallari (2023)
2	Rudy Fernandez	15	Pasukuin si Waway (1984)	Operation: Get Victor Corpuz (1987)
2	Van de Leon	6	Taga sa Bato (1957)	Kamandag (1959)

The following individuals received four or more Best Actor nominations:

Nominations	Actor	First Nomination	Latest Nomination
19	Fernando Poe Jr.	Laban sa Lahat (1958)	Batas ng Lansangan (2002)
17	Christopher de Leon	Tinimbang Ka Ngunit Kulang (1974)	Nasaan ang Puso (1997)
15	Rudy Fernandez	Bitayin si... Baby Ama! (1976)	Birador (1998)
14	Joseph Estrada	Markang Rehas (1962)	Kumander Alibasbas (1981)
14	Phillip Salvador	Cain at Abel (1982)	Bobby Barkers: Parak (1997)
12	Aga Muhlach	Sinungaling Mong Puso (1992)	Uninvited (2024)
12	Eddie Garcia	De Colores (1968)	ML (2018)
11	Dolphy	Like Father, Like Son (1967)	Markova: Comfort Gay (2000)
11	Eddie Rodriguez	Sapagkat Kami'y Tao Lamang (1963)	Alaala Mo, Daigdig Ko (1974)
10	Ramon "Bong" Revilla Jr.	Pieta: Ikalawang Aklat (1984)	Si Agimat, si Enteng Kabisote at si Ako (2012)
9	Cesar Montano	Leonardo delos Reyes: Alyas Waway (1993)	Ligalig (2006)
8	Dindo Fernando	Paalam sa Kahapon (1965)	Muling Buksan ang Puso (1985)
8	John Lloyd Cruz	One More Chance (2007)	A Second Chance (2015)
8	Piolo Pascual	Milan (2004)	Mallari (2023)
7	Coco Martin	Kinatay (2009)	Love or Money (2020)
7	Dingdong Dantes	Segunda Mano (2011)	Rewind (2023)
7	Richard Gomez	Tuklaw (1986)	The Love Affair (2015)
6	Allen Dizon	Paupahan (2008)	Latay (2020)
6	Daniel Padilla	Pagpag: Siyam na Buhay (2013)	Kun Maupay Man it Panahon (2021)
6	Dante Rivero	Adriana (1969)	Kung Paano Hinihintay ang Dapithapon (2018)
6	George Estregan	Psycho Sex Killer (1970)	Lalake Ako (1982)
6	Van de Leon	Taga sa Bato (1957)	Maria Cecilia (1965)
5	Anthony Alonzo	Dakpin si Junior Bumbay (1979)	Moises Padilla Story: The Missing Chapter (1985)
5	Eddie del Mar	Bandilang Pula (1955)	Sino ang Matapang (1962)
5	Efren Reyes Sr.	Desperado (1956)	Alaala Kita (1961)
4	Ace Vergel	Pieta (1983)	Anak ng Cabron (1988)
4	Albert Martinez	Rizal sa Dapitan (1997)	Abakada... Ina (2001)
4	E.R. Ejercito	Manila Kingpin: The Asiong Salonga Story (2011)	Muslim Magnum .357: To Serve and Protect (2014)
4	Edu Manzano	Palimos ng Pag-Ibig (1986)	Tatarin (2001)
4	Jericho Rosales	Nasaan Ka Man (2005)	Alagwa (2012)
4	Jose Padilla Jr.	Huk sa Bagong Pamumuhay (1953)	Objective: Patayin si Magsaysay (1957)
4	Luis Gonzales	Talipandas (1958)	Pinagbuklod ng Pag-Ibig (1969)
4	Ramon Revilla	Nardong Putik (1972)	Cordillera (1986)
4	Robin Padilla	Barumbado (1990)	Bonifacio: Ang Unang Pangulo (2014)
4	Romeo Vasquez	Bobby (1958)	Maruja (1967)
4	Ronald Remy	Akin ang Paghihiganti (1960)	Flight of the Sparrow (1966)
4	Vic Vargas	Kasalanan Kaya? (1968)	Huwag Tularan: Pito ang Asawa Ko (1974)

== Superlatives ==
Superlative	Best Actor	
Oldest winner	Eddie Garcia	89
Oldest nominee	Eddie Garcia	89
Youngest winner	Christopher De Leon	19
Youngest nominee	Jansen Magpusao	15

== Trivia ==
- Eddie Garcia won the award more than any actors with six wins. Joseph Estrada, Fernando Poe Jr. and Christopher De Leon have also won the award five times. All four of them are inducted to the FAMAS Hall of Fame. Allen Dizon won his 5th Best Actor for Latay in the 69th awards ceremony and is eligible for Hall of Fame induction in 2022.
- Three actors have won the award consecutively. They are Christopher De Leon (in 1991 and 1992), Allen Dizon (in 2010 and 2011), and ER Ejercito (in 2012, 2013 and 2014)
