= 2024 FAMAS Awards =

Annual Filipino film awards ceremony

72nd FAMAS Awards
- Date: May 26, 2024
- Site: Manila Hotel, Manila
- Directed by: Vince Tañada

Highlights
- Best Picture: Mallari
- Most awards: Mallari (4)
- Most nominations: Mallari (14)

The 72nd Filipino Academy of Movie Arts and Sciences (FAMAS) Awards took place on May 26, 2024, at the Manila Hotel in Manila and honored the best Filipino films released in 2023.

== Winners and nominees ==
=== Awards ===
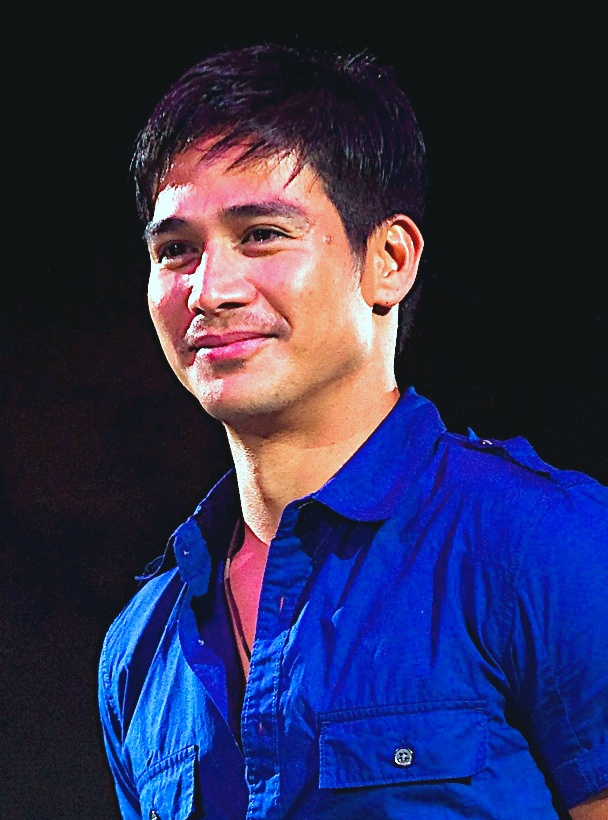
Piolo Pascual, Best Actor co-winner

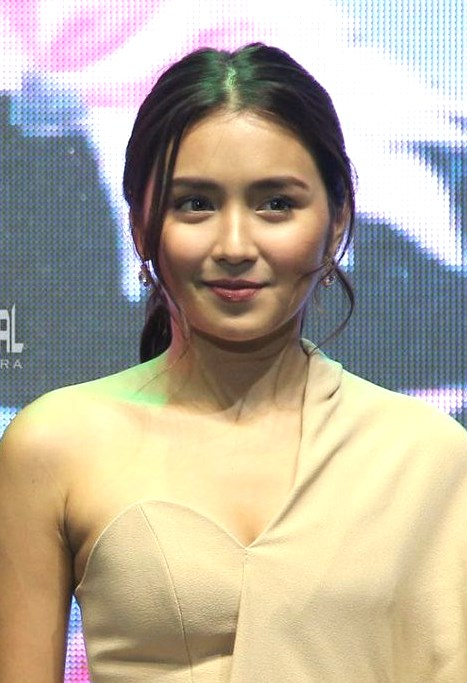
Kathryn Bernardo, Best Actress winner

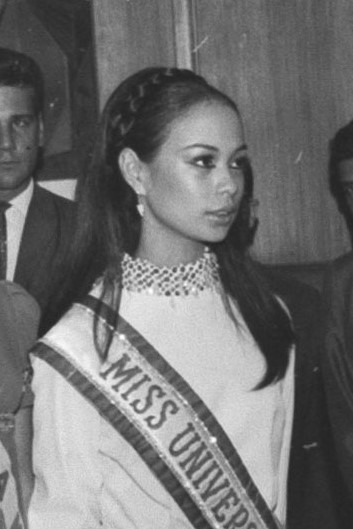
Gloria Diaz, Best Supporting Actress winner

Winners are listed first, highlighted in boldface.

**Best Picture**: **Mallari**; A Very Good Girl; GomBurZa; Iti Mapukpukaw; Papa Mascot; Rewind	**Best Director**: **Louie Ignacio – Papa Mascot**; Pepe Diokno – GomBurZa; Carl Joseph Papa – Iti Mapukpukaw; Mae Cruz-Alviar – Rewind; Petersen Vargas – A Very Good Girl; Roderick Cabrido – Mallari
**Best Actor**: **Piolo Pascual – Mallari as Juan Severino Mallari, Johnrey Mallari, and Jonathan Mallari de Dios**; **Alfred Vargas – Pieta as Isaac Bernabe**; Alden Richards – Family of Two as Mateo; Cedrick Juan – GomBurZa as José Burgos; Dingdong Dantes – Rewind as John Nuñez; Ken Chan – Papa Mascot as Nico	**Best Actress**: **Kathryn Bernardo – A Very Good Girl as Philo**; Charlie Dizon – Third World Romance as Britney; Eugene Domingo – Becky & Badette as Becky; Marian Rivera – Rewind as Mary Nuñez; Maricel Soriano – In His Mother's Eyes as Lucy; Sharon Cuneta – Family of Two as Maricar
**Best Supporting Actor**: **LA Santos – In His Mother's Eyes as Tim**; Enchong Dee – GomBurZa as Jacinto Zamora; JC Santos – Mallari as Brother Lucas Alarcon Segundo; Pepe Herrera – Rewind as Lods; Romnick Sarmenta – Becky & Badette as Pepe Feniz; Soliman Cruz – Monday First Screening as Norman	**Best Supporting Actress**: **Gloria Diaz – Mallari as Doña Facunda Mallari**; Gina Alajar – Pieta as Beth; Dolly de Leon – A Very Good Girl as Molly "Mother" Suzara; Liza Diño-Seguerra – Papa Mascot as Debbie; Ruby Ruiz – Monday First Screening as Deborah; Alessandra de Rossi – Firefly as Mariela "Elay" Alvaro
**Best Child Actor**: **Euwenn Mikaell – Firefly as Tonton**; Jordan Lim – Rewind as Austin Nuñez; Kian Co – Mallari as Ponce	**Best Child Actress**: **Elia Ilano – Pinoy Ghost Tales as Lea**; Erin Rose Espiritu – Kampon as Jade; Erin Rose Espiritu – Papa Mascot as Colleen
**Best Screenplay**: **Enrico C. Santos – Mallari**; Angeli Guidaya-Atienza – Firefly; Carl Joseph Papa – Iti Mapukpukaw; Jerry Gracio – Pieta; Ralston Jover – Papa Mascot; Rody Vera, Pepe Dioknο & Ian Victoriano – GomBurZa	**Best Cinematography**: **Carlo Mendoza – Gomburza**; Kara Moreno – Third World Romance; Neil Daza – Firefly; Neil Daza – Rewind; Noel Teehankee – A Very Good Girl; Pao Orendain – Mallari
**Best Visual Effects**: **Gaspar Mangarin – Mallari**; Brian Galagnara, Danilo Handog Jr. & John Kenneth Paclibar – GomBurZa; Carl Joseph Papa – Iti Mapukpukaw; Dave Yu – Firefly	**Best Editing**: **Benjamin Gonzales Tolentino – The Missing**; Benjamin Gonzales Tolentino – A Very Good Girl; Benjamin Gonzales Tolentino – GomBurZa; Gilbert Obispo – Papa Mascot; Marya Ignacio – Rewind; Noah Tonga – Mallari
**Best Production Design**: **Marielle Hizon – Mallari**; Cheska Salangsang – A Very Good Girl; Eero Yves Francisco – Third World Romance; Ericson Navarro – GomBurZa; JayLo Conanan – Becky & Badette	**Best Sound**: **Emilio Bien A. Sparks, Michael Keanu Cruz & Albert Michael Idioma – Rewind**; Armand De Guzman – Becky & Badette; Gilberto Obispo – Papa Mascot; Immanuel Verona & Fatima Nerikka Salim – Mallari; Jannina Mikaela Minglanilla, Emilio Bien A. Sparks & Albert Michael Idioma – GomBurZa
**Best Original Song**: **"Finggah Lickin'" – Becky & Badette**; "Pag-Ibig na Sumpa" – Mallari; "Patawad Inay" – In His Mother's Eyes; "Sa Ating Paglipad" – Papa Mascot; "Sa Duyan ng Bayan" – GomBurZa; "Sa Yakap Mo" – Family of Two	**Best Musical Score**: **Teresa Barrozo – GomBurZa**; Andrew Florentino – A Very Good Girl; Cesar Francis Concio – Rewind; Decky Margaja – Papa Mascot; Teresa Barrozo – Iti Mapukpukaw; Von De Guzman – Mallari
**Best Documentary Film**: **Maria**; Martial Law; Meron sa Siyudad	**Best Short Film**: **Huling Sayaw ni Erlinda**; I Still Think About You; Indigo; Mission Accomplished
**Iconic Movie Actors of Philippine Cinema**: **Dante Rivero**; **Eddie Gutierrez**; **Lito Lapid**; **Pepito Rodriguez**; **Ramon "Bong" Revilla Jr.**; **Roger Calvin**	**Iconic Movie Actresses of Philippine Cinema**: **Barbara Perez**; **Divina Valencia**; **Marissa Delgado**; **Nova Villa**; **Pilar Pilapil**; **Snooky Serna**

=== Honors ===
- Fernando Poe Jr. Memorial Award – Efren Reyes Jr.
- Susan Roces Celebrity Award – Helen Gamboa
- Dr. Jose Perez Memorial Award – Elwood Perez
- Angelo "Eloy" Padua Memorial Award for Journalism – Baby K. Jimenez
- FAMAS Presidential Award – Gina De Venecia and Pempe Rodrigo
- German Moreno Youth Achievement Award – Joaquin Domagoso
- FAMAS Special Citation Award – Gloria Romero, Greg Martin, and Pilar Padilla
- FAMAS Lifetime Achievement Award – Perla Bautista, Romeo Rivera, and Tina Loy

== Controversy ==
FAMAS President, Francia Conrad apologized to Eva Darren: "they were not able to “locate” her because they were “running a live show with myriads of people,” she said. Darren was tasked but failed to present Special Citations with Tirso Cruz III, after she received a notice of invitation for the FAMAS awards night", Fernando de la Pena, her son said. A "young singer" Sheena Palad replaced Darren, who paid P5,000 ($90) per plate for her 4 grandchildren. On May 28, Darren and her family decided to accept the olive branch of FAMAS organizers for the incomprehensible irresponsible snub. "Please stick to the script... and maybe a nice pair of eyeglasses for all in charge,” Darren's son Fernando recommended.
