= 1963 FAMAS Awards =

Annual Filipino film awards ceremony

11th FAMAS Awards
- Date: April 14, 1963
- Site: Araneta Coliseum, Philippines

Highlights
- Best Picture: El filibusterismo (Arriva-Bayanihan Productions)
- Most awards: El filibusterismo (7 wins)
- Most nominations: El filibusterismo (11 nominations)

The 11th FAMAS Awards Night was presented by the Filipino Academy of Movie Arts and Sciences on April 14, 1963, honoring the outstanding achievements of Filipino films for the year 1962.

El filibusterismo is a film adaptation of Jose Rizal's novel of the same name, and was made by the same company who made the film Noli Me Tángere. It won the FAMAS Award for Best Picture and another FAMAS for Best Director to Gerardo de León.

== Awards ==
=== Major awards ===
Winners are listed first and highlighted with boldface.

Best Picture	Best Director
**El filibusterismo — Arriva-Bayanihan Productions**; Ako ang Katarungan — Premiere Productions; Albano Brothers — FPJ Productions; Kapag Buhay ang Inutang — People's Pictures; Ligaw Na Daigdig — Tamaraw; Madugong Paghihiganti —; Markang Rehas — Tagalog Ilang ilang Productions; Oy Akin Yata Yan — Dalisay Pictures; Pitong Kabanalan ng Isang Makasalanan — RV Productions; Walang Pagkalupig — Jasmin Tagalog PIctures	**Gerardo de León — El filibusterismo**; Gerardo de Leon — Ako ang Katarungan; Efren Reyes — Albano Brothers; Cesar Gallardo — Ligaw Na Daigdig; Ding de Jesus — Madugong Paghihiganti; Armando Garces — Markang Rehas; F.H. Constantino — Oy... Akin Yata Yan; Armando Garces — Pitong Kabanalan ng Isang Makasalanan; Pablo Santiago — Walang Pagkalupig
Best Actor	Best Actress
**Joseph Estrada — Markang Rehas**; Fernando Poe Jr. — Ako ang Katarungan; Berting Labra — Ano Ba Choy; Pancho Magalona — El filibusterismo; Rome Vasquez — Pitong Kabanalan ng Isang Makasalanan; Eddie Del Mar — Sino ang Matapang; Cesar Ramirez — Suicide Susy; Fernando Poe Jr. — Walang Pagkalupig	**Perla Bautista — Markang Rehas**; Charito Solis — El filibusterismo; Aura Aurea — Kapag Buhay ang Inutang; Ludy San Juan — Lakas sa Lakas; Lina Cariño — Madugong Paghihiganti; Carmen Rosales — Mama's Boy; Nida Blanca — Oy.. Akin Yata Yan; Lolita Rodriguez — Pitong Kabanalan ng Isang makasalanan; Lilia Dizon — Sadalista; Liza Morena — Sino ang Matapang
Best Supporting Actor	Best Supporting Actress
**Lou Salvador Jr. — Ako ang Katarungan**; Oscar Keesee — Albano Brothers; Robert Arevalo — El filibusterismo; Ruben Rustia — Kapag Buhay ang Inutang; Alfonso Carvajal — Ligaw Na Daigdig; Martin Marfil — Madugong Paghihiganti; Willie Sotelo — Oy.. Akin Yata Yan; Max Alvarado — Pitong kabanalan ng isang makasalanan: Johnny Monteiro — Suicide Susy; Paquito Diaz — Walang Pagkalupig	**Gloria Sevilla — Madugong Paghihiganti**; Adorable Liwanag — Ako ang Katarungan; Monang Carvajal — El filibusterismo; Rosa Aguirre — Mahal Kita Inay; Lita Gutierez — Oy.. Akin Yata Yan; Edita Clomera — Sakdalista; Stella Suarez — Siete Bandidos; Yolanda Guevarra — Sino ang Matapang; Ludy San Juan — Suicide Susy
Best in Screenplay	Best Story
**Adrian Cristobal, Gerardo de Leon, Jose Flores Sibal — El filibusterismo**	**Jose Rizal — El filibusterismo**
Best Sound Engineering	Best Musical Score
**Luis Reyes — El filibusterismo**	**Tito Arevalo — El filibusterismo**
Best Cinematography	Best Editing
**Mike Accion — El filibusterismo**	**Atilano Salvador — Ako ang Katarungan**
