= Leopoldo Salcedo =

Filipino actor

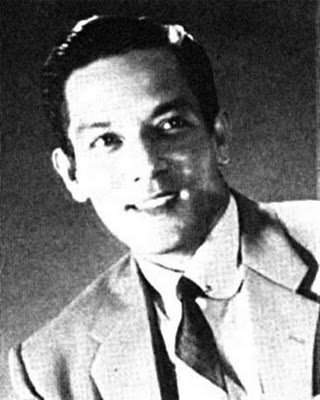
- Salcedo in 1948
- Born: Leopoldo Ganal Salcedo; March 12, 1912; San Roque, Cavite, Philippine Islands
- Died: June 11, 1998 (aged 86); Pasig, Philippines
- Occupation: Filipino actor
- Years active: 1934–1993
- Awards: FAMAS Best Actor; 1961 The Moises Padilla Story; FAMAS Supporting Actor; 1976 Ganito Kami Noon, Paano Kayo Ngayon

Leopoldo Ganal Salcedo Sr. (March 12, 1912 – June 11, 1998) was a Filipino film actor dubbed as "The Great Profile" who specialized in portraying dramatic heroes.

== Early life ==
Salcedo was born in Cavite. His father was of Spanish descent whose family immigrated in the Philippines years prior. His mother was a Filipina. In his youth, he had entered the seminary with aspirations towards priesthood, but he left after a year. Instead, he joined the bodabil troupe of Lou Borromeo in 1929. By 1934, Salcedo had broken into films, starring in José Nepomuceno's Sawing Palad. He was playing leading roles by the late 1930s, and signed up with the newly formed LVN studio. Among his most prominent roles during this period was as Macario Sakay, in Lamberto Avellana's debut film Sakay (1939).

Film production in the Philippines was halted after the Japanese invasion in 1941, and Salcedo returned to bodabil. He would perform at the Avenue Theater for the duration of the war. Salcedo also engaged in guerilla activities, for which he was incarcerated and released only upon the intercession of Benigno Aquino Sr.

== Postwar stardom ==
After the war ended in 1945, Salcedo starred in such dramas as Capas (1946) and Siete Dolores (1948). In 1950, Salcedo formed his own production company, Leopoldo Salcedo Productions, which produced such films as Dalawang Bandila (1950), Talampasan (1953), and Highway 54 (1953). Many of Salcedo's post-war choices in roles tended towards socially relevant dramas. He had intended to produce a film on the life of the Hukbalahap leader Luis Taruc. Films such as Bisig ng Manggagawa (1951) and Batong Buhay (Sa Central Luzon) (1950) dealt with labor and agrarian strife. Years later, when he was cited by the Gawad Urian for its lifetime achievement award, his film career were characterized in this manner:

[M]ore than just good looks, he was also radical with his characterizations, preferring to portray the politicized and the social outcast, the underdog and enraged sheep while his meztizo confreres chose the dusted tuxedos and the rank perfumes of the music halls. From the very start, his approach to acting has always been to emphasize “being”, to be honest to oneself, to pour one’s heart and soul into the role and to eschew the artificial as this could be magnified several times on the big screen.

Salcedo's most famous role came in 1961, when he starred as the titular character in Gerry de Leon's The Moises Padilla Story, a film biography of a Negros Occidental mayoral candidate who in 1951, was tortured and murdered by the private army of the provincial governor after he had refused to withdraw his candidacy. For this role, Salcedo won his first FAMAS Best Actor award. He would win another FAMAS, this time as Best Supporting Actor, in 1976 for his portrayal of a zarzuela actor in Eddie Romero's Ganito Kami Noon, Paano Kayo Ngayon.

Salcedo's film career slowed down in the 1980s. His last film appearance was in Raymond Red's 1993 film Sakay, where he played the father of the same character he had portrayed 54 years earlier. He had been bedridden for one year before his death in 1998.

== Legacy ==
Salcedo has been referred by various film journalists as the original "King of Philippine Movies" and has contributed to over 200 (Note: According to The Weekly Nation in 1971, Salcedo has starred in over 500 films.) feature films throughout his career that spanned over six decades. According to The Weekly Nation, he was one of the highest paid actors of his generation and was reportedly earning more than a million dollars annually at some point in his career. Manila Standard writer Cip Roxas described Salcedo as "one of the best in the business".

Salcedo is credited for popularizing a "Valentino-style of barong tagalog" in the 1950s. Fashion historian Eric Cruz added, "the style didn’t die with Salcedo. Its modern reincarnations, all gaud and glitter like the original, are worn by show-biz personalities to add sparkle to the spotlight." Esquire have included Salcedo in their list of 15 most stylish movie stars of classic Philippine cinema. The National Commission for Culture and the Arts (NCCA) and the Film Development Council of the Philippines (FDCP) have screened Salcedo's 1961 biographical film The Moises Padilla Story at the 8th Cinema Rehiyon Festival in De La Salle University—Dasmariñas as a tribute to "Cavite actors who made a big contribution to the country's film industry."

== Filmography ==
- Sawing Palad (1934)
- Walang Sugat (1939) – Tenyong
- Sakay (1939) – Macario Sakay
- Maginoong Takas (1940)
- Dawn of Freedom (1944) – Captain Reyes
- Capas (1946)
- Ang Kamay ng Diyos (1947)
- Sierra Madre (1948)
- Siete Dolores (1948)
- Dalawang Bandila (1950)
- Florante at Laura (1950) – Florante
- Hantik (1950)
- Batong Buhay (Sa Sentral Luson) (1950)
- Bisig ng Manggagawa (1951)
- Talampasan (1953)
- Highway 54 (1953)
- Saigon (1956)
- Lost Battalion (1960) - Ramon
- Noli Me Tángere (1961) - Elias
- The Moises Padilla Story (1961) - Moises Padilla
- Target 1-1-1 (also known as The Raiders of Leyte Gulf, 1962)
- Cry of Battle (1963) - Manuel Careo
- W.I.A. Wounded in Action (1966)
- Combat Killers (1968) - Gen. Kenji Takahashi
- Mission Batangas (1968) - Santos
- Beast of the Yellow Night (1971) – Inspector Santos
- Savage Sisters (1974) – General Balthazar
- Ganito Kami Noon... Paano Kayo Ngayon? (1976) - Fortunato 'Atong' Capili
- Halikan Mo at Magpaalam sa Kahapon (1977)
- Payaso (1986)
- Boy Negro (1988) – Carlos Cayanan
- Sakay (1993) - Macario Sakay's father

== Accolades ==
Awards and nominations received by Leopoldo Salcedo
Organizations	Year	Recipient	Category	Result	Ref.
Doña Josefa Edralin-Marcos Foundation and At Iba Pa (Note: At Iba Pa is a group of film personalities which include Boots Anson-Roa, Mel Chionglo, Mike de Leon, Simon Ongpin, Bibsy Carballo, Ishmael Bernal, Ronald Constantino and Laurice Guillen.)	1982	Leopoldo Salcedo	Walang Kupas Award	Honored	
Eastwood City Walk of Fame	2006	Leopoldo Salcedo	Inductee	Honored	
FAMAS Awards	1962	The Moises Padilla Story	Best Actor	Won	
FAMAS Awards	1963	Madugong Paghihiganti	Best Actor	Nominated	
FAMAS Awards	1977	Ganito Kami Noon... Paano Kayo Ngayon?	Best Supporting Actor	Won	
FAMAS Awards	1978	Halikan Mo at Magpaalam sa Kahapon	Best Supporting Actor	Nominated	
Gawad Urian	1994	Leopoldo Salcedo	Lifetime Achievement Award	Honored	
Luna Awards	1989	Leopoldo Salcedo	Lifetime Achievement Award	Honored	
Star Award for Movies	1992	Leopoldo Salcedo	Ulirang Artista Lifetime Achievement Award	Honored	
Star Award for Movies	1994	Leopoldo Salcedo	Vic Silayan Memorial Acting Award	Honored	

== Sources ==
- Rodell, Paul (2002). Culture and customs of the Philippines. Bloomsbury Academic. ISBN 9780313304156.
- Danny Villanueva (1994). "Philippine Film". In Nicanor Tiongson (ed.). CCP Encyclopedia of Philippine Art. Vol. VIII (1st ed.). Manila: Cultural Center of the Philippines. p. 314. ISBN 971-8546-31-6.
- Augustin Sotto. "Natatanging Gawad 1994: Leopoldo Salcedo". Manunuri ng Pelikulang Pilipino. Archived from the original on 2006-10-20.
