= Pieta (2023 film) =

- Directed by: Adolfo Alix Jr.
- Written by: Jerry Gracio
- Produced by: Alfred Vargas
- Starring: Nora Aunor; Alfred Vargas
- Production company: Alternative Vision Cinema; Noble Wolf
- Release date: December 23, 2023 (Metro Manila Film Festival)
- Country: Philippines
- Language: Filipino

Pieta is a 2023 Philippine drama film starring Nora Aunor and Alfred Vargas. It was directed by Adolf Alix Jr.

== Cast ==
- Nora Aunor as Rebecca Bernabe, a blind elderly woman with Alzheimer's disease, who has trouble remembering her son. Aunor, who underwent surgery in 2010 after damaging her vocal cords, is noted for having sung the Kapampangan song "Atin Cu Pung Singsing" for the film. She insisted on including the song due to its relevance to the film story. Aunor wore a contact lens on her left eye to simulate a cataract for the role.
  - Angeli Bayani as young Rebecca
- Alfred Vargas as Isaac Bernabe, Rebecca's son. He was sentenced to life imprisonment for the killing of his father at the age of 16. After 18 years of imprisonment, Isaac was granted a pardon and reunited with his mother.
- Jaclyn Jose as Santi's mother
- Gina Alajar as Beth
- Alan Paule as Isaac's father
- Bembol Roco as Francis, Isaac's prisonmate.
- Ina Raymundo as Sarah
- Miggy Jimenez as Santi
- Tommy Alejandrino as Jonil

== Production ==
The development of Pieta was publicly announced as early as February 2023.

Pieta was produced under Alternative Vision Cinema and Noble Wolf. Adolfo Alix Jr. was the director with co-star Alfred Vargas also a producer. The film was derived from an original story by Alix, and not a remake of the 1983 film of the same name which had several adaptations. Jerry Gracio was the screenwriter.

Pieta was filmed in March 2023 in less than ten days. The film is primarily set in a cornfield in Pampanga. By June 2023, the film is already in the post-production stage.

== Release ==
Pieta was initially projected to be released in May 2023, the month when Mother's Day falls. It was later submitted for the 2023 Metro Manila Film Festival, which opened on December 23, 2023. However, Pieta was not accepted as an entry.

The film had a sneak screening as early as December 22, 2023 and was given a limited release on December 23, 2023. Pieta is scheduled to have its theatrical release in the Philippines sometime around 2024.

== Accolades ==
Date	Awards	Category	Recipient	Result	Ref.
May 26, 2024	72nd Famas Awards	FAMAS Award for Best Actor	Alfred Vargas	Won	
May 26, 2024	72nd Famas Awards	FAMAS Award for Best Supporting Actress	Gina Alajar	Nominated	
May 26, 2024	72nd Famas Awards	FAMAS Award for Best Screenplay	Jerey Gracio	Nominated	
May 26, 2024	72nd Famas Awards	Circle of Excellence	Nora Aunor	Won	
July 21, 2024	40th PMPC Star Awards for Movies	PMPC Star Award for Movie Actor of the Year	Alfred Vargas	Nominated	
July 21, 2024	40th PMPC Star Awards for Movies	Star Award for Movie Actress of the Year	Nora Aunor	Won	
July 21, 2024	40th PMPC Star Awards for Movies	Star Award for Movie Supporting Actor of the Year	Bembol Roco	Nominated	
July 21, 2024	40th PMPC Star Awards for Movies	Star Award for Movie Supporting Actress of the Year	Gina Alajar	Nominated	
July 21, 2024	40th PMPC Star Awards for Movies	Star Award for Indie Movie of the Year	Pieta	Nominated	
July 21, 2024	40th PMPC Star Awards for Movies	Star Award for Indie Movie Director of the Year	Adolfo Alix Jr	Nominated	
July 21, 2024	40th PMPC Star Awards for Movies	Star Award for Indie Movie Screenwriter of the Year	Jerry Gracio	Nominated	
July 21, 2024	40th PMPC Star Awards for Movies	Star Award for Indie Movie Cinematographer of the Year	Nelson Macababat	Nominated	
July 21, 2024	40th PMPC Star Awards for Movies	Star Award for Indie Movie Editor of the Year	Adolfo Alix Jr, Mark Joseph Llona	Nominated	
July 21, 2024	40th PMPC Star Awards for Movies	Star Award for Indie Movie Musical Scorer of the Year	Mikoy Morales	Nominated	
July 21, 2024	40th PMPC Star Awards for Movies	Star Award for Indie Movie Production Designer of the Year	Jhon Paul Sapitula	Nominated	
July 21, 2024	40th PMPC Star Awards for Movies	Star Award for Indie Movie Sound Engineer of the Year	Immanuel Verona	Nominated	
July 21, 2024	40th PMPC Star Awards for Movies	Star Award for Indie Movie Ensemble Acting of the Year	Pieta	Won	
