= Kaaway ng Batas =

Philippine action film

- Directed by: Pepe Marcos
- Written by: Jose Carreon; Humilde "Meek" Roxas; Henry Cruz
- Produced by: Rudy Fernandez
- Starring: Rudy Fernandez
- Cinematography: Rey de Leon
- Edited by: Pepe Marcos
- Music by: Jaime Fabregas
- Production company: Reflection Films
- Distributed by: Reflection Films
- Release date: December 4, 1990
- Running time: 105 minutes
- Country: Philippines
- Languages: Filipino; English

Kaaway ng Batas (transl. The Enemy of the Law) is a 1990 Philippine action film edited and directed by Pepe Marcos. The film stars Rudy Fernandez. This is the first film produced by Rudy and Lorna Tolentino under their film company Reflection Films.

== Cast ==
- Rudy Fernandez as Lt. Bobby Sandoval
  - Howard Aleta as Young Bobby
- Zaldy Zshornack as Col. Cleofas
- Vic Diaz as Don Pedro
- Edu Manzano as Ryan
- Efren Reyes Jr. as Mike
- Star Querubin as Olga
- Ali Sotto as Barbara
- Gabby Concepcion as Rafael Aleta
  - Harold Aleta as Young Rafael
- Zandro Zamora as Lt. Mendoza
- Robert Talabis as Jack
- Johnny Vicar as Captain Marcelino
- Mia Gutierrez as Anna
  - Katrin Gonzales as Young Anna
- Joey Padilla as Tisoy
- Millet Advincula as Barbara's Friend
- Jim Rosales as Sarge
- Lucita Soriano as Mother
- Rodolfo 'Boy' Garcia as Stepfather
- Ernie Zarate as Doctor
- Dick Israel as Buyer of Dope
- Rene Hawkins as Rapist Slaughter House
- Josie Tagle as Crying Mother in Precinct
- Joe Watts as Police Sargeant Slaugher House
- Vic Felipe as Editor
- Joey Galvez as Attorney
- Nick Nicholson as Club Owner
- Rene Matias as Wounded Officer
- Efren Belardo as Investigating Officer
- Val Iglesias as Hitman Inside Car

== Awards ==
Year	Awards	Category	Recipient	Result	Ref.
1990	14th Gawad Urian Award	Best Actor	Rudy Fernandez	Nominated	
1991	39th FAMAS Awards	Best Picture	Kaaway ng Batas	Nominated	
1991	39th FAMAS Awards	Best Director	Pepe Marcos	Nominated	
1991	39th FAMAS Awards	Best Actor	Rudy Fernandez	Nominated	
1991	39th FAMAS Awards	Best Supporting Actor	Edu Manzano	Won	
