= El filibusterismo (film) =

Filipino period drama film directed by Gerardo de León

- Official movie poster
- Directed by: Gerardo de León
- Screenplay by: Gerardo de León; Adrian Cristobal; Jose Flores Sibal
- Based on: El filibusterismo by José Rizal
- Produced by: Antonio R. Riva
- Starring: Pancho Magalona; Charito Solis; Teody Belarmino; Edita Vital; Ben Perez; Carlos Padilla Jr.; Lourdes Medel; Robert Arevalo; Oscar Keesee
- Cinematography: Mike Accion
- Edited by: Teofilo de Leon
- Music by: Tito Arevalo
- Production company: Arriva-Bayanihan Productions
- Release date: March 30, 1962
- Country: Philippines
- Language: Tagalog

El filibusterismo is a 1962 Philippine period drama film co-written and directed by Gerardo de León. Based on the 1891 novel of the same name by José Rizal, it is a sequel to the 1961 film Noli Me Tángere, and stars Pancho Magalona, Charito Solis, Teody Belarmino, Edita Vital, Ben Perez, Carlos Padilla Jr., Lourdes Medel, Robert Arevalo, and Oscar Keesee. The film was released on March 30, 1962.

El filibusterismo won seven FAMAS Awards, including Best Picture, Best Director, and Best Screenplay. Alongside its predecessor, the film is now considered a classic in Philippine cinema.

== Plot ==
13 years after the events of Noli Me Tángere, Crisostomo Ibarra returns to the Philippines with the new persona of a jeweller named Simoun. Disillusioned at the possibilities for peaceful reform within the system, he plots to spark an uprising in his country through violent means and in the process save his love Maria Clara from the convent.

== Cast ==
- Pancho Magalona as Simoun / Crisostomo Ibarra
- Charito Solis as Juli
- Teody Belarmino
- Edita Vital as Maria Clara
- Ben Perez as Kabesang Tales
- Carlos Padilla Jr. as Isagani
- Lourdes Medel as Paulita
- Robert Arevalo as Basilio
- Oscar Keesee as Father Camorra
- Ramon D'Salva
- Joseph de Cordova as Father Florentino
- Paquito Diaz
- Boy Francisco
- Alfonso Carvajal
- Jose Garcia
- Nello Nayo
- Patrino Carvajal
- Jerry Pons as Juanito
- Francisco Cruz
- Paquito Salcedo as Kapitan Tiago
- Dadang Ortega
- Felisa Salcedo
- Primo Yumol
- Tommy Nepomuceno
- Quiel Mendoza
- Manny Ojeda
- Fred Ramirez
- Turing Ramirez
- Johnny Fernandez

== Subsequent screenings ==
El filibusterismo was screened in 1981 as part of the Philippine Cinema Panorama section of the 3rd Three Continents Festival in Nantes, France.

In February 2014, the film was screened at the Cultural Center of the Philippines in celebration of Gerardo de León's centenary.

== Accolades ==
Group	Category	Name	Result
FAMAS Awards	Best Picture	El filibusterismo	Won
FAMAS Awards	Best Director	Gerardo de León	Won
FAMAS Awards	Best Screenplay	Gerardo de León, Adrian Cristobal, and Jose Flores Sibal	Won
FAMAS Awards	Best Story	José Rizal	Won
FAMAS Awards	Best Cinematography	Mike Accion	Won
FAMAS Awards	Best Film Score	Tito Arevalo	Won
FAMAS Awards	Best Sound	Luis Reyes	Won
