= Itataya Ko ang Buhay Ko =

Philippine action film

- Directed by: Jose N. Carreon
- Screenplay by: Jose N. Carreon; Ricardo Lee
- Produced by: Robbie Tan; Victoria Lorna Fernandez
- Starring: Rudy Fernandez; Dawn Zulueta
- Cinematography: Ricardo Herrera
- Edited by: Edgardo Vinarao
- Music by: Jaime Fabregas
- Production company: Reflection Films
- Distributed by: Seiko Films
- Release date: May 27, 1996
- Running time: 100 minutes
- Country: Philippines
- Language: Filipino

Itataya Ko ang Buhay Ko (lit. I Will Bet My Life) is a 1996 Philippine action film co-written and directed by Jose N. Carreon. The film stars Rudy Fernandez and Dawn Zulueta.

== Cast ==
- Rudy Fernandez as Capt. Edmond Rosario
- Dawn Zulueta as Andrea Serrano
- Pia Pilapil as Rebecca
- Ricky Davao as Cesar Padua
- Mat Ranillo III as Lt. Torres
- Mark Gil as Capt. Lucban
- Charito Solis as Edmond's Mother
- Lito Legaspi as Col. Sabino
- Bob Soler as Rivero
- CJ Ramos as Junjun
- Melissa de Leon as Edmond's Wife
- Ramil Rodriguez as Maj. Lizares
- Kirby de Jesus as Edmond's Son
