= Father Dámaso =

- Noli Me Tángere character
- Created by: José Rizal

In-universe information
- Full name: Dámaso Verdolagas
- Alias: Padre Dámaso
- Gender: Male
- Occupation: Roman Catholic priest
- Children: María Clara (daughter)
- Religion: Roman Catholic
- Nationality: Spanish

Padre Dámaso Verdolagas is a fictional character in the novel Noli Me Tángere. The novel was written by José Rizal, one of the leaders of the Propaganda Movement in the Philippines. Noli Me Tángere (Touch Me Not or "Social Cancer") is a controversial and anticlerical novel that exposed the abuses committed by the Spanish friars (belonging to the Roman Catholic Church) and the Spanish elite in colonial Philippines during the 19th century.

The novel, according to the author, represented the state of Philippine society under Spanish colonial rule. It was intended as a liberal-nationalist wake-up call for the people of the Philippines. While the natives (indios) were trained to become secular clergy, Spanish priests in the powerful religious orders were given preferential treatment in the assignment to parishes.

== Character summary ==
Dámaso Verdolagas, a Franciscan Spanish priest, was the former curate of the town of San Diego. He was an enemy of Don Rafael Ibarra, Crisóstomo Ibarra's father; Don Rafael refuses to conform to the friars' power. After Don Rafael's death in jail, Padre Dámaso ordered his corpse exhumed and transferred to the Chinese cemetery, which he considered was for heathens. He was later revealed to be the biological father of María Clara. María Clara's mother, Doña Pía Alba, and Don Santiago de los Santos had been trying to conceive a child when Padre Dámaso raped Doña Pia.

Near the end of the novel, he and María Clara had a dispute about her not marrying Alfonso Linares, and her going to the convent or dying. This broke Padre Dámaso's heart. By the end of the novel, he was transferred to another town to be its curate. He was later found dead due to unknown causes, possibly depression or hypertension.

== Legacy ==
- Padre Dámaso was portrayed in the following films and television series:
  - Oscar Keesee - Noli Me Tángere (1961)
  - Subas Herrero in the ABC television series Noli Me Tángere (1992)
  - Cristóbal Gómez - José Rizal (1998)
  - Arnell Ignacio - Damaso (2019)
  - Tirso Cruz III - Maria Clara at Ibarra (2022-2023)
- "Padre Damaso", a 1990's hit song Filipino heavy metal band Warlak, appears on various compilation albums such as The Tone Def Collection Volume 1 released in 1997, refers to corrupt religious leaders who use the name of God for their personal gain.
- The Tagalog term "anak ni Padre Dámaso" ("child of Father Dámaso") has become a stereotype or cliché in the Philippines to refer to a white or half-white (Spanish: mestizo) child whose father is unknown. It can also refer to a child whose father was (or who was suspected to be) a Spanish clergyman. The term also became a reference to any corrupt religious leader in the Philippines, especially among the Roman Catholic clergy.
- Filipino tour guide and cultural activist Carlos Celdran was arrested for shouting and bearing a sign with the word "Dámaso" at the Manila Cathedral during an ecumenical service, to protest the bishops' stance against abortion and contraception on September 30, 2010.
