= Teody Belarmino =

Filipino actor

- Born: Teodulfo Decena Belarmino; 1922; Calamba, Laguna, Philippine Islands
- Died: 1984 (aged 61–62)

Teody Belarmino (born Teodulfo Decena Belarmino; 1922-1984) was a Filipino actor originally from the rustic town of Calamba, Laguna.

The first stage of Belarmino's career was dedicated to his home studio LVN Pictures. Belarmino is one of the leading men in the stable of fine seasoned actors under the stewardship of LVN Studios. Some of his leading ladies are: Rebecca Gonzales in Mutya ng Pasig, Tessie Quintana in Kapitan Erlinda ng Candaba, Celia Flor in Ang Tapis Mo Inday, and Lilia Dizon in Venus.

In September 1967, Belarmino was among the four assailants in the fatal shooting of Arturo Fernandez, son of politician Estanislao Fernandez. Though Belarmino and the three attempted to bring him to the hospital, Fernandez was declared dead upon arrival, with Belarmino surrendering to the police the day after and arguing self-defense.

== Filmography ==
=== Films under LVN Pictures ===
Year	Title	Role	Notes	Ref
1947	Maling Akala		Film debut	
1948	Malaya (Mutya ng Kagubatan)			
1949	Ibigin Mo Ako, Lalaking Matapang			
1949	Capas			
1949	Hen. Gregorio del Pilar			
1950	Mutya ng Pasig	Basilio		
1950	Florante at Laura	Aladin		
1950	Candaba			
1950	Nagsaulian ng Kandila			
1950	Tininti Del Barrio			
1951	Ang Tapis Mo Inday			
1951	Venus			
1951	Dalawang Prinsipeng Kambal			
1951	Singsing Na Sinulid			
1954	Krus Na Bakal	Nestor		
1954	Kandilerong Pilak			
1955	Tagapagmana			

=== Under other production companies ===
Year	Title	Role	Notes	Ref
1951	Lihim ni Bathala			
1951	Singsing Na Sinulid			
1955	Elephant Girl			
1956	Heneral Paua			
1956	Princesa ng Kagubatan			
1956	Haring Tulisan			
1958	Impiyerno sa Paraiso			
1961	Halik ni Hudas			
1961	Noli Me Tángere	Tarcilo		
1961	North Harbor			
1961	Sigaw sa Langit			
1961	Umasa Ka Mahal Ko (sa Bilisan)			
1962	El filibusterismo			
1962	Hindi Kami Laos			
1962	Jose Bandido			
1963	Madugong Paghihiganti (The Massacre)		initially titled Maliwalu	
1963	Angustia			
1963	Bulilit Al Capone		guest star	
1963	Tacio			
1963	Shoot to Kill			
1965	Dugo sa Pantalan			
1966	Alyas Don Juan (Agent 1-2-3)		special performance	
1971	Bakit Ba... Candida?			
1974	Ugat			
1975	Basta't Isipin Mong Mahal Kita			
1975	Dugo at Pag-ibig sa Kapirasong Lupa		First segment	
1975	Diwang Kayumanggi (Prinsesang Mandirigma)			
1979	Arnis			
1981	Rampador Alindog (Barako ng Cavite)			
1982	Kumander Melody			

Late in his career, Belarmino appeared in notable supporting roles in the following films: Boy Zapanta (Pentagon Films), Ang Kabayaran (Academy Films), Bakit May Putik ang Bulaklak? (GS Pictures), Ang Halaga Ay Luha, Laman at Dugo (Emerald Films), and Sa Maamo...Mabangis Na Kamay (P. Maglinao Enterprises). Belarmino also had a brief stint in the television series Annaliza starring Julie Vega.
