= Leopoldo Salcedo Production =

Leopoldo Salcedo Production (also known as LGS Films short for Leopoldo Ganal Salcedo Films) was a Philippine movie outfit formed by actor Leopoldo Salcedo. It produced 13 films, including the blockbusters Divisoria...Quiapo... (1955) and La Roca Trinidad (1951).
