= Monday First Screening =

2023 film directed by Benedict Mique

- Theatrical release poster
- Directed by: Benedict Mique
- Screenplay by: Benedict Mique; Aya Anunciacion
- Produced by: Billy Ray Gamboa; Caesar Vallejos
- Starring: Ricky Davao; Gina Alajar
- Cinematography: Owen Berico
- Edited by: Noah Tonga
- Music by: Pearlsha Abubakar
- Production companies: NET25 Films; Lonewolf Films
- Distributed by: Regal Entertainment
- Release date: August 30, 2023
- Running time: 104 minutes
- Country: Philippines
- Language: Filipino

Monday First Screening is a 2023 Philippine romantic comedy directed by Benedict Mique and written by Mique and Aya Anunciacion. It Stars Ricky Davao, Gina Alajar. the film is about two elderly individual who find love while watching a free movie every Monday in a cinema.

== Cast ==
- Ricky Davao as Bobby
- Gina Alajar as Lydia
- Ian Ignacio
- Che Ramos
- Soliman Cruz
- Ruby Ruiz
- Reign Parani
- Allen Abrenica
- David Minemoto
- Joy Cerro

== Release ==
The film was released nationwide in 100 cinemas on August 30, 2023, distributed by Regal Entertainment under NET25 Films Banner.

== Reception ==
Fred Hawson of ABS-CBNnews.com rate the film 7 out of 10 and wrote: Veteran award-winning film actors, Gina Alajar and Ricky Davao were both radiant, raising this film up another level with their winsome sincerity. Their romantic chemistry as Lydia and Bobby felt very real and thrilling, so delightful to watch in their carefree scenes.

Mario Bautista of Journal News gave the film a positive feedback and wrote: Monday First Screening shows that in love, age doesn’t really matter. A heartwarming romance between two senior citizens, it definitely demonstrates that love is ageless and knows no bounds.

Jun Mendoza of Letterboxd gave the film 3 stars and wrote: Great idea at its core and was successful in giving us this kilig rom-com with mature protagonists. But it needed improvement on its storytelling and pacing as there was one instance wherein all other supporting characters were trauma dumping on Gina Alajar's character which through off that path.

== Accolades ==
Year	Awards	Category	Recipient	Result	Ref.
2024	72nd FAMAS Award	Best Supporting Actor	Soliman Cruz	Nominated	
2024	72nd FAMAS Award	Best Supporting Actress	Ruby Ruiz	Nominated	
2024	40th PMPC Star Awards for Movies	Star Award for Movie Actress of the Year	Gina Alajar	Nominated	
