= María Clara =

Fictional character

- Noli Me Tángere character
- Created by: José Rizal Leonor Rivera, who was José Rizal's childhood sweetheart, served as the inspiration for the fictional character María Clara

In-universe information
- Gender: Female
- Occupation: Monastic
- Family: Santiago de los Santos (Adopted father); Padre Damaso (biological father); Pía Alba ( Biological mother)
- Relatives: Tiya Isabel (aunt)
- Religion: Roman Catholic
- Nationality: Filipino

María Clara de los Santos y Alba is a fictional character in Jose Rizal's novel Noli Me Tángere (1887). The beautiful María Clara is the childhood sweetheart and fiancée of the protagonist, Crisóstomo Ibarra, who returns to his Filipino hometown of San Diego to marry her. After Ibarra is implicated in a fake revolution and is thought to be dead, María Clara opts to become a nun rather than marry another man. She remains unhappy for the rest of her life and her death is later mentioned in the sequel, El filibusterismo (1891).

== Description ==
In the novel, María Clara is regarded as the most beautiful and celebrated lady in the town of San Diego. A devout Roman Catholic, she became the epitome of virtue; "demure and self-effacing" and endowed with beauty, grace and charm, she was promoted by Rizal as the "ideal image" of a Filipino woman who deserves to be placed on the "pedestal of male honour". In Chapter 5, María Clara and her traits were further described by Rizal as an "Oriental decoration" with "downcast" eyes and a "pure soul".

== Characterization ==
=== Physical appearance ===
Because of her parentage, María Clara had Eurasian features, described by Rizal thus:

"María Clara did not have the small eyes of her father: like her mother she had them large and black, beneath long lashes; she was beautiful and smiling when she played, sad and soulful and pensive when she was not laughing. Since childhood her hair had an almost golden hue; her nose, of a correct profile, was neither sharp nor flat; her mouth reminded one of her mother's, small and perfect, with two beautiful dimples on her cheeks. Her skin had the fine texture of an onion layer, the whiteness of cotton, according to her enthusiastic relatives. They saw traces of Capitan Tiago's paternity in the small and well-rounded ears of María Clara."

=== Biography and personality ===
María Clara is the childhood sweetheart and fiancée of the protagonist, Crisóstomo Ibarra, who returns to his Filipino hometown of San Diego to marry her. After Ibarra is implicated in a fake revolution and is thought to be dead, María Clara opts to become a nun rather than marry another man. She remains unhappy for the rest of her life and her death is later mentioned in the sequel, El filibusterismo (1891).

María Clara is the only daughter of the wealthy Kapitán Tiago and Doña Pia Alba. However, it is later revealed that her biological father is Father Dámaso, a priest who is one of the novel's antagonists, who became her godfather. Interpretations vary on whether Dámaso seduced or/and raped Pia Alba.

María Clara had been described in her childhood as everybody's idol, growing up "among smiles and loves". Although Noli only touches upon her briefly in chapters, she is depicted as playful, exchanging wit and bantering with Ibarra, as well as expressing jealous possession when talking about him to her friends.

She is also very kind and considerate, and notices people whom others do not; she was the only person who noticed Elías during the fishing excursion and offered him biscuits. During the eve of the feast of San Diego, she also approached and offered her locket to a leper, despite her friends' warnings and shows of disgust.

During the latter half of the novel, she was often sickly and subdued. Having been separated from Ibarra, and hearing the news of his excommunication, she took ill, and eventually was blackmailed by Padre Salvi into distancing herself from Ibarra. She was also coerced into giving up Ibarra's love letters, which were ultimately used to implicate him.

In spite of her broken engagement with Ibarra, and subsequent engagement to Linares, she remained fiercely devoted to Ibarra. Upon hearing the news of his death, she told Padre Dámaso:

"While he was alive, I was thinking on keeping on: I was hoping, I was trusting! I wanted to live to be able to hear about him... but now that they have killed him, there is no longer a reason for me to live and suffer... While he was alive, I could get married... I thought of flight afterwards... my father does not want anything but the connections! Now that he is dead nobody else shall claim me as his wife... When he was alive, I could degrade myself, there was left the comfort of knowing he lived and perhaps would think of me. Now that he is dead... the convent for me or the grave!"

This ultimatum caused Padre Dámaso to relent and permit his daughter's entry into the Royal Monastery of Saint Clare (that until 1945 stood in Intramuros).

== Basis and legacy ==
Rizal based the fictional character of María Clara on his girlfriend and second cousin, Leonor Rivera. Although praised and idolized, María Clara's chaste, "masochistic" and "easily fainting" character has also been denounced as the "greatest misfortune that has befallen the Filipina in the last one hundred years".

In the 1920s, María Clara became what Nick Joaquin described as a saccharine ideal, a sentimentalized stock character. Catholicism during Spanish colonial rule influenced a new ideal for Filipino women and led to taboos surrounding the discussion and expression of female sexuality. María Clara embodied the ideals and the impossible standard of purity, chastity and sacrifice. While many scholars have attacked the idealized María Clara, writers such as Joaquin disagree that Rizal wrote the character as an example for Filipino women to imitate. The ideal of María Clara continues into the 21st century and is used by brands. This depiction has reinforced the cultural expectation brought by Spanish colonialism that Filipinas should be modest, conservative and submissive towards men.

Writers such as Joaquin, Ante Radaic, and Wenceslao Retana, saw María Clara as a symbol of the Philippines, especially in the sad fate which befalls her. Quintin C. Terrenal thought it likely that Rizal's contemporaries also saw the symbolism, and Ibarra himself said that she was "the poetic incarnation of my country".

In Filipino fashion, María Clara's name has become the eponym for a multi-piece ensemble known as the María Clara gown, emulating the character's traits of being delicate, feminine, self-assured, and with a sense of identity. In law, the María Clara doctrine originated in a 1960 case concerning a rape accusation. It states that "women, especially Filipinos, would not admit that they have been abused unless that abuse had actually happened. This is due to their natural instinct to protect their honor."

== In popular culture ==
Maria Clara has been portrayed in several films and television series:

- Edita Vidal in the film Noli Me Tángere (1961)
- Maria Jose Arnaldo in the ABC television series Noli Me Tángere (1992)
- Monique Wilson in the film José Rizal (1998), and various Musical Plays
- Julie Anne San Jose in the GMA television series Maria Clara at Ibarra (2022-2023)
- Angel Galang in the television series Drag Race Philippines (Season 3) during the Snatch Game episode (2024)

== See also ==
- Cult of domesticity
- English rose (epithet)
- Girl next door
- Ideal womanhood

== Bibliography ==
- Hau, Caroline S. (2021). "The Afterlives of María Clara". Humanities Diliman. 18 (1): 118–161.
