= Rudy Fernandez (actor) =

Filipino actor and producer (1952–2008)

- Born: Rodolfo Valentino Padilla Fernandez; March 3, 1952; Tondo, Manila, Philippines
- Died: June 7, 2008 (aged 56); Quezon City, Philippines
- Resting place: The Heritage Park, Taguig, Metro Manila
- Other name: Daboy
- Occupations: Actor, producer
- Years active: 1970–2008
- Political party: LDP (2001)
- Spouse: Lorna Tolentino (m. 1983)
- Children: 3, incl. Mark Anthony and Renz
- Parent(s): Gregorio Fernandez; Paz Padilla
- Relatives: Padilla family
- Awards: FAMAS Fernando Poe, Jr. Memorial Award; 2007; FAMAS Best Actor; 1988 Operation: Get Victor Corpus, the Rebel Soldier; 1984 Batuigas...Pasukuin si Waway; FAP Best Actor; 1984 Batuigas...Pasukuin si Waway; PMPC Star Awards: Male Star of the Night; 2000

Rodolfo Valentino Padilla Fernandez (March 3, 1952 – June 7, 2008), better known as Rudy Fernandez or Daboy, was a Filipino actor and producer. He came to prominence as an action star in Philippine cinema during the 1970s up to the 1990s.

== Early life and career ==
Fernandez was born at 8:36 PM on March 3, 1952, at Mary Johnston Hospital in Tondo, Manila. He was the eldest son of dentist and filmmaker Gregorio Fernandez and Paz Padilla, daughter of José Padilla Sr. Both his parents were from Lubao, Pampanga, which he considered his hometown. He made his film debut at the age of three, appearing in Luksang Tagumpay (1956), which was directed by his father. He also appeared in another film of his father's, Emily (1960). Fernandez's mother committed suicide in their home in 1957 due to postpartum depression, while one of his brothers also committed suicide out of fear of being punished for his actions by his father.

Fernandez started his active film career while a student at the University of Santo Tomas, when he was signed to a contract by Sampaguita Pictures in 1970. He was first featured by Sampaguita Pictures in For Your Mama (1970), then paired with Connie Angeles in Sweet Matutina (1970). Fernandez spent the next few years in teenage parts until he made his breakthrough as an action star with Bitayin si... Baby Ama? (1976). His viability as an action star was further enhanced with the box-office success of Ang Leon, ang Tigre at ang Alamid (1979).

Beginning with Baby Ama, a biopic of a well-known Filipino criminal, Fernandez specialized in portraying true-to-life characters. One of his notable action films is Markang Bungo (Skull Mark), a film based on a true story, where he portrayed the well-known Baguio police officer Bobby Ortega, was released in 1992. From this film came a signature line of Fernandez's, "Walang personalan, trabaho lang" ("Strictly business, nothing personal"), which has since been cited as among the most memorable quotes in Philippine cinema by QTV's Ang Pinaka television program. Iligpit si Bobby Ortega: Markang Bungo 2 (Execute Bobby Ortega, Skull Mark 2) is a sequel that was released in 1995.

Aside for portraying a real police officer, he was cast in the lead roles for the biopics of Filipino politicians Alfredo Lim, Vincent Crisologo, and Ping Lacson. In the film Lagalag: The Eddie Fernandez Story, he starred as Eddie Fernandez, a Filipino actor during the 1970s and the father of Pops Fernandez.

With the decline of production of Filipino action films during the 2000s, Fernandez turned to television roles. In the short-lived GMA Network sitcom Da Boy, en Da Girl, he starred opposite Rosanna Roces. He also played as a supporting role in other TV series in GMA like Twin Hearts and Atlantika. He was also the host of the docu-drama Kasangga.

=== Awards ===
Fernandez has won two FAMAS Best Actor awards for the action films Batuigas... Pasukuin si Waway (Batuigas... Make Waway Surrender) (1984) and Operation: Get Victor Corpus, the Rebel Soldier (1988). In addition to these wins, FAMAS has also nominated Rudy Fernandez an additional 13 times from 1976 to 1998. He also won two FAP Best Actor awards for Batuigas... and for Birador (1998).

In 2007, FAMAS awarded him the Fernando Poe, Jr. Memorial Award. The next year, the Philippine Movie Press Club (PMPC) bestowed the 2008 Ulirang Artista Lifetime Achievement Award to Rudy Fernandez, at the 24th PMPC Star Awards for Movies. He was also the recipient of the Film Academy of the Philippines FPJ Lifetime Achievement Award.

== Personal life ==
Fernandez's hometown was Lubao, Pampanga. He was a member of the Padilla family in his maternal side. Actress Merle Fernandez was his sister, Robin, BB Gandanghari, and Rommel Padilla were his cousins and Zsa Zsa Padilla was his niece. He had two sons, Raphael Fernandez and Renz Fernandez with Lorna Tolentino, his wife, and one son, Mark Anthony Fernandez, with former partner Alma Moreno. His grandson Grae (son of Mark Anthony Fernandez) also joined the entertainment industry.

He was survived by his wife, sons, and cousins; consequently, as he was the Padilla brothers' cousin, his grandson, Grae Fernandez, is the nephew of teen king Daniel Padilla.

=== Politics ===
During the 2001 elections, Fernandez ran for mayor of Quezon City under the banner of Laban ng Demokratikong Pilipino's Puwersa ng Masa. Although he garnered most of the votes in District 2 where the voters were composed mostly of indigent citizens, he lost in the remaining three districts and was defeated by then-House Speaker Sonny Belmonte of the People Power Coalition.

=== Illness and death ===
In 2007, it was revealed by Lorna Tolentino on Startalk that her husband had been diagnosed with periampullary cancer. Fernandez underwent treatment in Tokyo, Japan. After a healing Mass on May 10, 2008, by several friends at the Christ the King Church, Quezon City, he was rushed to a San Juan hospital for back pains. The Sun Star reported that Fernandez was actually suffering from pancreatic cancer, instead.

Fernandez celebrated his 25th wedding anniversary with Lorna Tolentino on June 1, 2008. He suffered a seizure three days later on June 4, but refused to be taken back to the Cardinal Santos Memorial Center in San Juan.

Fernandez died from periampullary cancer at his home in Quezon City on the morning of June 7, 2008. His remains were brought to The Heritage Park in Taguig City, and his interment took place on June 12, 2008, at 3 p.m. for his burial.

== Filmography ==
=== Film ===
Year	Title	Role	Notes
1959	Luksang Tagumpay		
1960	Emily		
1970	For Your Mama		
1974	Patayin ang Dugong Tirador		
1974	7 Crazy Uragons		
1975	The Goodfather		
1976	Bitayin si... Baby Ama?	Baby Ama	
1976	Bongbong	Mando	
1976	Wanted: Agad-Agad		
1976	Wanted...Ded or Alayb?	Raymond	
1976	Ikaw... Ako Laban sa Mundo		
1976	Usigin ang Maysala		
1977	Makahiya at Talahib	Arturo Clemente	
1977	Alfredo Lim: Sa Kamay ng Ibabaw	Alfredo Lim	
1977	Gameng	Wilfredo J. Gameng	
1977	Valentin Labrador		Muntinlupa Riot 1950
1977	Iligpit si Pretty Boy		
1978	Bilangguan Walang Rehas		
1978	Doble Kara		
1978	Joe Quintero	Quintero	
1978	Teteng Salonga ng Tondo		
1979	Hoodlum Killer		Re-released in December 1987
1979	Holdup (Special Squad, D.B.)		
1979	Isang Araw Isang Buhay	Arturo Porcuna	
1979	Maynila		
1979	Nuwebe De Pebrero		
1979	Star		
1980	Tatak Angustia	Rene	
1980	Sa Init ng Apoy		
1980	Pader at Rehas		
1980	Deadly Brothers	Ading	
1980	Puga	Wilfredo "Willy" S. Mercado	
1981	Pepeng Shotgun	Medrano	
1981	Ulo ng Gapo		
1981	Lukso ng Dugo		
1981	Kosa		
1981	Kumander Kris	Abdul	
1981	Death Row		
1981	Dakpin: Killers for Hire		
1981	Laya		
1982	Tres Kantos	Edgar	
1982	Bagong Boy Condenado	Boy Condenado	
1982	Mga Pambato	Peping Guwapo	
1982	Ang Tapang Para sa Lahat!	Alex	
1982	Get My Son Dead or Alive	Lt. Renato Parraguas	
1982	Kumander Elpidio Paclibar		
1982	Guillermo Soliman		
1982	Enkuwentro		
1983	Somewhere	Logarte	
1983	Sumuko Ka Ronquillo	Ronquillo	
1983	Kumusta Ka na Hudas?		
1983	Alex San Diego: Alyas Wanted	Alex	
1983	Kunin ang Ulo ni Magtanggol	Rufo Magtanggol	
1983	Inside Job		
1983	Tatak ng Yakuza		
1984	Idol		
1984	Sarge		
1984	Montemayor: Tulisang Dagat	Montemayor	
1984	Kriminal		
1984	Kahit Ako'y Lupa		
1984	Batuigas: Pasukuin si Waway	Waway	
1985	Anak ng Tondo	Berting	
1985	Bilang Na ang Oras Mo	Bobby	
1985	Baun Gang	Sgt. Alejandrino Baun	
1985	Tatak Munti		
1985	Calapan Jailbreak		
1985	Sangley Point Robbery (The Day They Robbed America)	Ruben Martinez	
1986	Deadly Target		
1986	Mabuhay Ka... sa Baril!		
1986	Teritoryo Ko Ito		
1986	Lumuhod Ka sa Lupa!		
1986	Laban Kung Laban	Dante	
1987	Operation: Get Victor Corpus, the Rebel Soldier	Victor Corpus	
1987	Humanda Ka... Ikaw ang Susunod		
1987	Vigilante	Pantaleon	
1988	Tubusin Mo ng Dugo		
1988	Sandakot Na Bala		
1989	Ipaglalaban Ko		
1990	Ayaw Matulog ng Gabi		
1990	Kaaway ng Batas	Lt. Sandoval	
1991	Bingbong: The Vincent Crisologo Story	Vincent Crisologo	
1991	Markang Bungo: The Bobby Ortega Story	Bobby Ortega	
1992	Kahit Buhay Ko...	Marco	
1992	Kamay ni Cain		
1993	Kung Kailangan Mo Ako	Elmo	
1993	Tumbasan Mo ng Buhay		
1994	Nagkataon, Nagkatagpo	Gomer	
1994	Lagalag: The Eddie Fernandez Story	Eddie Fernandez	
1994	Ang Pagbabalik ni Pedro Penduko	Bobby Ortega	Special Appearance
1995	Iligpit si Bobby Ortega: Markang Bungo 2	Bobby Ortega	
1995	Matimbang Pa sa Dugo	Carlos	
1995	Kuratong Baleleng	Major Antonio Rodriguez	
1996	Itataya Ko ang Buhay Ko	Capt. Edmund Rosario	
1996	'Wag na Wag Kang Lalayo	Genner Ramirez	
1997	Ayos Lang Pare Ko!	Turo	
1998	Birador	Sgt. Mike Santana	
1998	Ginto't Pilak	Ben Pilak	
2000	Palaban	Major Jack Morales	
2000	Sagot Kita, Mula Ulo Hanggang Paa	Fireman	
2000	Ping Lacson: Super Cop	Panfilo Lacson	
2000	Pedro Penduko II: The Return of Comeback	Himself	
2002	Diskarte	Jake	
2002	Hula Mo, Huli Ko	Inspector Tuazon	
2002	Ang Alamat ng Lawin	Friend of Lawin	Uncredited
2003	Utang ng Ama		

=== Television ===
Year	Title	Role
1999–2002	Kasangga	Host
2002–2003	Daboy en Da Girl	Daboy
2003–2004	Twin Hearts	Oscar Saraga
2006	Now and Forever: Linlang	Arman Barrinuevo
2006–2007	Atlantika	Camaro (Last TV series appearance)
