= Noli Me Tángere (film) =

1961 drama film by Gerardo de León

- 1961 theatrical film poster
- Directed by: Gerardo de León
- Screenplay by: Gerardo de León; Jose Flores Sibal
- Based on: Noli Me Tángere by José Rizal
- Produced by: Antonio R. Riva
- Starring: Eduardo del Mar; Edita Vital; Johnny Monteiro; Oscar Keesee; Teody Belarmino; Leopoldo Salcedo
- Cinematography: Emmanuel Rojas; Arsenio Bañu
- Edited by: Victoriano Calub; Joven Calub
- Music by: Tito Arevalo
- Production company: Arriva-Bayanihan Productions
- Release date: June 16, 1961
- Country: Philippines
- Language: Pilipino

Noli Me Tángere is a 1961 Philippine period drama film co-written and directed by Gerardo de León. Based on the 1887 novel of the same name by José Rizal, it stars Eduardo del Mar, Edita Vital, Johnny Monteiro, Oscar Keesee, Teody Belarmino, and Leopoldo Salcedo. Produced by Arriva-Bayanihan Productions, the film was released theatrically on June 16, 1961, timed with the centenary of Rizal's birth. A sequel, El filibusterismo, was released in 1962.

Noli Me Tángere won five FAMAS Awards, including Best Picture and Best Director. The film is now considered a classic in Philippine cinema.

== Cast ==
- Eduardo del Mar as Crisostomo Ibarra
- Edita Vital as Maria Clara
- Johnny Monteiro as Padre Salvi
- Oscar Keesee as Padre Damaso
- Teody Belarmino as Tarcilo
- Leopoldo Salcedo as Elias
- Ramon d'Salva as Alferez
- Ruben Rustia as Maestro
- Max Alvarado as Lucas
- Nello Nayo as Don Filipo
- Engracio Ibarra as Don Tiago
- Lilian Laing de Leon as Dña. Victorina
- Veronica Palileo as Isabel
- Joseph de Cordova as Pablo
- Manny Ojeda as Tenyente Guevarra
- Fred Gonzales as Pilosopong Tacio
- Lito Anzures as Sarhento
- Andres Centenera as Alkalde
- Jose Garcia as Kapitan Heneral
- Pianing Vidal as Dr. Espadaña
- Dely Villanueva as Dña. Consolacion
- Luis San Juan as Pedro
- Francisco Cruz as Gobernadorcillo
- Salvador Zaragoza as Sakristan Mayor
- Jerry Pons as Linares
- Lina Cariño as Sisa
- Dik Trofeo
- Dante Molina
- Michael Angelo Torrepalma
- Kim Adrian Andales
- John Lloyd Casia
- Edjay Pecision
- Rogelio Albino Pisot

== Production ==
Filipino painter Carlos V. Francisco served as the production designer for Noli Me Tángere.

Filmmaker Eddie Romero, who had intended to write his own film adaptation of José Rizal's Noli Me Tángere before director Gerardo de León began production, stated that de León had only a limited amount of time to create the film, and as a result, Romero found the film unable to fully adapt the novel as he would wish. Romero would eventually receive the opportunity to direct his television adaptation of the novel in 1992.

== Restoration ==
In 1989, the only surviving film print of Noli Me Tángere was discovered to be in poor condition, upon which the German Embassy of the Philippines and Goethe-Institut requested the Federal Foreign Office of Germany to retrieve and rescue the film. In Koblenz, Germany, the film was successfully restored by Fruitzer Black Archive and the Federal Film Archive, and within the same year was sent back to the Philippines. The Philippine Information Agency later made a copy of the restored negative, with the duplicate print used for the June 19, 1990 premiere of the remastered version at the Cultural Center of the Philippines. Manila Standard columnist Ariel Bocobo claimed that numerous audience members at the premiere were unable to fully appreciate the film due to "the swarm of giant mosquitoes which hungrily feasted on the moviegoers."

== Re-release ==
As part of the 150th anniversary celebration of José Rizal's birth, Noli Me Tángere was given a re-release in select SM Cinemas throughout the Philippines in June 2011.

== Accolades ==
Group	Category	Name	Result
FAMAS Awards	Best Picture	Noli Me Tángere	Won
FAMAS Awards	Best Director	Gerardo de León	Won
FAMAS Awards	Best Supporting Actress	Lina Cariño	Won
FAMAS Awards	Best Supporting Actor	Oscar Keesee	Won
FAMAS Awards	Best Story	José Rizal	Won
