= Bitayin si... Baby Ama? =

- Directed by: John Gale
- Written by: Humilde 'Meek' Roxas
- Produced by: Baby Martinez
- Starring: Rudy Fernandez; Alma Moreno
- Cinematography: Jose Austria
- Music by: Totoy Nuke
- Distributed by: MBM Productions
- Release date: 1976
- Running time: 118 minutes
- Country: Philippines
- Language: Filipino

Bitayin si... Baby Ama? (Tagalog: Execute... Baby Ama?) is a 1976 Filipino film starring Rudy Fernandez and Alma Moreno, depicting the life of executed murderer and gang leader, Marciál "Baby" Ama. Ama, who became a gang leader with his own prison mob while serving a sentence for lesser charges, was executed for murder at the age of 16 via electric chair on October 4, 1961.

The film is credited with having launched Fernandez's career as an action star.

The film was followed by the sequel Anak ni Baby Ama (1990) starring Robin Padilla.
