= Walang Pagkalupig =

1962 Filipino film directed by Pablo Santiago

- Official movie poster
- Directed by: Pablo P. Santiago
- Screenplay by: Tommy C. David
- Starring: Fernando Poe Jr.; Joseph Estrada; Rodolfo Cristobal; Bert Silva
- Music by: Tito Arevalo
- Production company: Jasmin Tagalog Pictures
- Release date: August 22, 1962
- Country: Philippines
- Language: Filipino

Walang Pagkalupig (also known as "Never outfought") is a 1962 action film based on true story of PC Ranger Captain Laudemer Kahulugan. The film was directed by Pablo Santiago, written by Tommy C. David and stars Fernando Poe Jr., Joseph Estrada, Rodolfo Cristobal & Bert Silva. In this film the story centers around the heroic exploits PC Ranger Captain Laudemer Kahulugan (Fernando Poe, Jr.) tasked to hunt down Huk dissident leader Casto Alejandrino (Van de Leon).

== Cast ==
- Fernando Poe Jr.
- Joseph Estrada
- Rodolfo Cristobal
- Bert Silva
- Van De Leon
- Paquito Diaz
- Oscar Roncal
- Jerry Pons
- Yolanda Guevarra
- Helen Gamboa

== Awards and nominations ==
Year	Award giving body	Category	Nominated work	Results
1963	FAMAS Awards	Best Picture	"Walang Pagkalupig"	Nominated
1963	FAMAS Awards	Best Actor	"Fernando Poe Jr."	Nominated
1963	FAMAS Awards	Best Supporting Actor	"Paquito Diaz"	Nominated
1963	FAMAS Awards	Best Director	Pablo Santiago	Nominated
