= Papa Mascot =

Philippine drama film

- Directed by: Louie Ignacio
- Written by: Ralston Jover
- Produced by: Ken Chan
- Starring: Ken Chan
- Cinematography: TM Malones
- Edited by: Gilbert Obispo
- Music by: Decky Margaja
- Production company: Wide International
- Distributed by: Wide International
- Release date: April 26, 2023
- Running time: 94 minutes
- Country: Philippines
- Language: Filipino

Papa Mascot is a 2023 Philippine drama film directed by Louie Ignacio. The film stars Ken Chan in the title role. This is the first film produced by Wide International.

== Cast ==
- Ken Chan as Nico
- Erin Espiritu as Colleen / Nicole
- Miles Ocampo as Iris
- Gabby Eigenmann as Major Mendoza
- Liza Diño as Debbie
- JC Parker as Chona
- Jericho Arceo as Willie
- Sue Prado as Dely
- Joe Gruta as Gener
- Yian Gabriel Pecjo as Romy
- Jordhen Suan as Nicole
- Tabs Sumulong as Feli
- Terence Villanueva as Darren
- Miaca Mon as Jinky
- John Ventura as Ren Ren
