= Nora Aunor filmography =

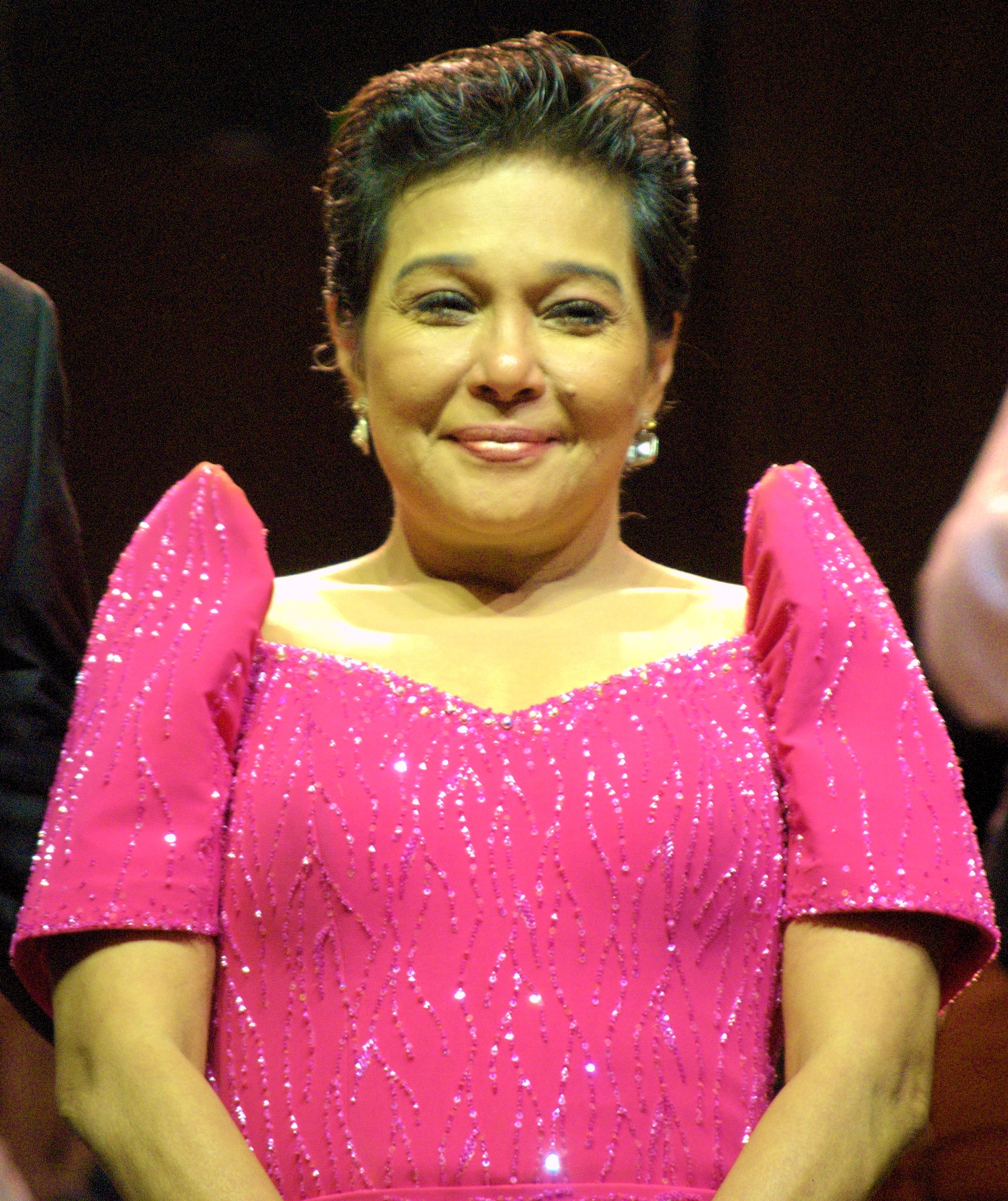
- Film: 186
- Television series: 11
- Television show: 6
- Hosting: 1
- Theatre: 3

Nora Aunor was a Filipino actress, recording artist, and film producer who has worked in theatre, radio, television, concerts and film.

Aunor began her career as a singer and became an actress. She made more than 175 movies in the span of more than 45 years. She is the only actress of her generation to have been directed by four National Artist of the Philippines awardees, Gerardo de Leon, Lamberto Avellana, Lino Brocka, and Ishmael Bernal. She was named by YES! Magazine as one of the "Philippines' 15 Best Actresses of All Time" in 2004,S Magazine named her as the "Philippines' Best Actress of All Time" in 2006, and in 2010, she was named as one of the "10 Asian Best Actresses of the Decade" at the Green Planet Movie Awards.

== Filmography ==
=== 1960-1970s ===
Year	Title	Role	Notes
1967	All Over the World		
1967	Way Out in the Country		
1967	Cinderella a-Go-Go		
1967	Pogi		
1967	Sitting in the Park		
1967	Ang Pangarap Ko'y Ikaw	Millie	
1968	Dobol Wedding		
1968	Bahay Kubo, Kahit Munti		
1968	May Tampuhan Paminsan-minsan		
1969	Drakulita	Mary	
1969	9 Teeners		
1969	Andriana		
1969	Banda 24		
1969	Halina Neneng Ko		
1969	Karate Showdown		
1969	Oh, Delilah	Delilah	
1969	Pa-bandying-bandying		
1969	Teenage Escapades!		
1969	YeYe Generation!		
1969	Young Girl		
1969	D' Musical Teenage Idols!		
1969	Fiesta Extravaganza		
1969	Nora (Single Girl)	Nora	
1970	Young Love	Ditas Aunor	
1970	Tomboy Nora	Nora	
1970	Teenage Jamboree		
1970	Tell Nora I Love Her	Nora	
1970	Orang		
1970	Munting Santa		
1970	Nasaan ka, Inay?		
1970	Three for the Road		
1970	The Singer and the Bouncer		
1970	The Young at Hearts		
1970	Darling		
1970	Nora in Wonderland		
1970	Hey There, Lonely Girl		
1970	I Dream of Nora		
1970	Ana Victoria	Ana Victoria	
1970	The Golden Voice	Nora	
1970	My Beloved		
1970	Around Asia with Nora	Nora	
1971	Guy and Pip	Guy	
1971	The Singing Filipina		
1971	My Prayer		
1971	Si Waray at ang Talyada	Nora	
1971	Lollipops and Roses	Nora Enriquez	
1971	Always in My Heart	Teresita Soriano	
1972	My Blue Hawaii	Leilani	
1972	A Gift of Love	Rose/Jane	Nominated–FAMAS Award for Best Actress
1972	Kung May Gusot, May Lusot	Bongbong	
1972	Winter Holiday	Linda	
1972	And God Smiled at Me	Celina	Quezon City Film Festival Award for Best Actress
1972	Nora, Mahal Kita	Nora	
1972	Dito sa Aking Puso		
1972	My Little Brown Girl	Marissa Sanchez	
1973	Aking Maria Clara	Maria Clara	
1973	Carmela	Carmela	
1973	As Long as There's Music		
1973	Kondesang Basahan		
1973	Impossible Dream	Melissa Gonzales	
1973	Erap Is my Guy		
1973	Paru-parung Itim		Nominated–FAMAS Award for Best Actress
1973	Tapat Na Pag-ibig		
1973	Binibini ng Palengke		
1973	Maalaala mo Kaya?	Delia Mejares	
1973	Dalawang mukha ng Tagumpay		
1973	Super Gee		
1973	Hindi kita Malimot	Loreta	
1974	You Will Be My Music		
1974	Somewhere Over the Rainbow		
1974	Fe, Esperanza, Caridad	Fe Amor; Esperanza; Caridad	Nominated–FAMAS Award for Best Actress
1974	Carnival Song		
1974	Happy Days Are Here Again		
1975	Memories of Our Love	Herself	
1975	Dugo at Pag-ibig sa Kapirasong Lupa	Nurse	
1975	Banaue: Stairway to the Sky	Banaue	Nominated–FAMAS Award for Best Actress
1975	Hello, Goodnight, Goodbye		
1975	Batu-bato sa Langit: Ang tamaa'y Huwag Magagalit	Orang Apacible	
1975	Lollipops and Roses at Burong Talangka		
1976	Magandang Gabi sa inyong Lahat	Anna Carballo	
1976	Wanted ... Ded or Alayb	Gregoria	
1976	Relaks lang mama... Sagot Kita!	Nora Tagle	
1976	Mrs. Teresa Abad, ako po si Bing		
1976	Kaming Matatapang ang Apog!	Potenciana Barada	
1976	Sapagka't Kami'y mga Misis Lamang		
1976	Ang Bulag, Ang Pipi at Ang Bingi		
1976	Tatlong Taong Walang Diyos	Rosario	FAMAS Award for Best Actress; Gawad Urian Award for Best Actress
1976	Minsa'y isang Gamu-gamo	Corazon de la Cruz	Nominated–Metro Manila Film Festival Award for Best Actress
1977	Pag-ibig ko'y Awitin mo		
1977	Pinakasalan ko ang Ina ng Aking Kapatid		
1977	Silang mga Mukhang Pera		
1977	Tisoy	Corazon Dela Cruz	
1977	Ibilanggo si... Neneng Magtanggol	Neneng Magtanggol	
1977	Panakip Butas		
1977	Sapin - sapin, Patong - patong		
1977	Disco Baby	Sarah Rey	
1977	Little Christmas Tree		
1977	Bakya mo Neneng	Neneng	Nominated–FAMAS Award for Best Actress; Nominated–Metro Manila Film Festival Award for Best Actress
1978	Pinagbuklod ng Pag-ibig	Laura Mendoza-San Juan	
1978	Bakekang	Bakekang	
1978	Isinilang ko ay hindi ko Tunay na Anak		
1978	Sa Lungga ng mga Daga		
1978	Mahal mo, Mahal ko	Nora	
1978	Dash a Lotsa Nonsents!	Cora Villamor	
1978	Mga Mata ni Angelita	the metro aide sweeper	
1978	Huwag hamakin! Hostess	Tonya	
1978	Ikaw Ay Akin	Teresita 'Tere' Valdez	Nominated–Gawad Urian Award for Best Actress
1978	Roma-Amor	Roma / Amor	
1978	Atsay	Nelia de Leon	Metro Manila Film Festival Award for Best Performer; Nominated–FAMAS Award for Best Actress
1978	Jack n' Jill of the Third Kind	Benita	
1979	Disco King		
1979	Anak ng Atsay	Gloria	
1979	Ang Tsimay at ang Tambay		
1979	Dobol Dribol		
1979	Si Mahal Ko... Nakialam Na Naman		
1979	Bakit May Pag-ibig Pa?		
1979	Annie Batungbakal	Annie Batungbakal	
1979	Ina Ka ng Anak Mo	Esther	FAMAS Award for Best Actress; Metro Manila Film Festival Award for Best Actress; Nominated–Gawad Urian Award for Best Actress
1979	Kasal-kasalan, Bahay-bahayan	Lagring	

=== 1980-1990s ===
Year	Title	Role	Notes
1980	Nakaw Na Pag-ibig	Corazon Rivera	
1980	Candy		
1980	Darling, Buntis Ka Na Naman	Juana/Jenny	
1980	Reyna ng Pitong Gatang	Senyang/Dr. Benedicto	
1980	Bongga Ka Day	Frida Manalo	
1980	Kastilyong Buhangin	Laura Lorenzo	
1980	Bona	Bona	Gawad Urian Award for Best Actress; Nominated–FAMAS Award for Best Actress; Nominated–Metro Manila Film Festival Award for Best Actress
1980	Kung Ako'y Iiwan Mo	Beatrice Alcala	Nominated–Metro Manila Film Festival Award for Best Actress
1981	Bakit Bughaw ang Langit?	Babette	Nominated–FAMAS Award for Best Actress; Nominated–Gawad Urian Award for Best Actress; Winner-Catholic Mass Media Award for Best Actress
1981	Totoo ba ang Tsismis?	Cora	
1981	Ibalik ang Swerti	Becky	
1981	Dalaga si Misis, binata si Mister	Doria	
1981	Gaano Kita Kamahal		
1981	Rock n' Roll		Nominated–Metro Manila Film Festival Award for Best Actress
1982	Mga Uod at Rosas	Socorro	Nominated–FAMAS Award for Best Actress
1982	Annie Sabungera	Annie	
1982	Palengke Queen	Tipang	
1982	No Other Love	Reyna Elena (Guest Role)	
1982	Tinimbang ang Langit	Herself	
1982	T-Bird at Ako	Sylvia Salazar	
1982	Himala	Elsa	Metro Manila Film Festival Award for Best Actress; Nominated–FAP Award for Best Actress; Nominated–Gawad Urian Award for Best Actress
1983	Minsan, May Isang Ina	Ruth	Nominated–FAMAS Award for Best Actress
1983	Bad Bananas sa Puting Tabing	Secret Agent Maria Clara Cayugyug	
1984	'Merika	Mila Cruz	Nominated–Gawad Urian Award for Best Actress; Winner-PMPC Star Awards for Best Actress
1984	Condemned	Yolly	
1984	Bulaklak sa City Jail	Angela Aguilar	FAMAS Award for Best Actress; Metro Manila Film Festival Award for Best Actress; Nominated–FAP Award for Best Actress; Nominated–Gawad Urian Award for Best Actress
1985	Beloved	Adora Bernal	
1985	Till We Meet Again	Teresa Mendoza	
1985	Tinik sa Dibdib	Lorna	Nominated–FAP Award for Best Actress
1985	Mga Kuwento ni Lola Basyang	Sabel	"Kerubin" segment
1985	I Can't Stop Loving You	Amy Mercado	Nominated–FAMAS Award for Best Actress; Nominated–Metro Manila Film Festival Award for Best Actress
1986	Ang Mahiwagang Singsing		
1986	Okleng Tokleng	Teresa	
1986	I Love You Mama, I Love you Papa	Flora Yllana	Nominated–FAMAS Award for Best Actress; Nominated–FAP Award for Best Actress
1986	Halimaw: Halimaw sa Banga	Regina	
1986	Payaso	Lorna	
1987	My Bugoy Goes to Congress	Cathy	
1987	Tatlong Ina, Isang Anak	Aurora "Au-Au" Sison	
1987	Takot Ako, Eh!	Amelia	
1988	Sana Mahalin Mo Ako	Maria	
1988	Penoy... Balut	Cristina	
1988	Sa Dulo ng Panahon		
1989	Greatest Performance	Laura Villa	
1989	Bilangin ang mga Bituin sa Langit	Noli/Maggie	FAMAS Award for Best Actress; FAP Award for Best Actress; Gawad Urian Award for Best Actress
1990	Iputok Mo... Dadapa Ako! (Hard to Die)	Elsa	
1990	Andrea, Paano Ba ang Maging Isang Ina?	Andrea	FAMAS Award for Best Actress; FAP Award for Best Actress; Gawad Urian Award for Best Actress; Metro Manila Film Festival Award for Best Actress; Young Critics Circle Award for Best Performance
1991	Ang Totoong Buhay ni Pacita M.	Pacita Macaspac	FAP Award for Best Actress; Metro Manila Film Festival Award for Best Actress; Young Critics Circle Award for Best Performance; Nominated–Gawad Urian Award for Best Actress
1993	Inay	Sally Murillo	Young Critics Circle Award for Best Performance; Nominated–Metro Manila Film Festival Award for Best Actress
	Ligaw-Ligawan Kasal-Kasalan Bahay-Bahayan: Ligaw-Ligawan	Melinda	
1995	The Flor Contemplacion Story	Flor Contemplacion	FAP Award for Best Actress; Gawad Urian Award for Best Actress; Young Critics Circle Award for Best Performance
1995	Muling Umawit ang Puso	Loida Verrano	Metro Manila Film Festival Award for Best Actress; Nominated–Young Critics Circle Award for Best Performance
1996	Bakit May Kahapon Pa?	Helen/Karina Salvacion	Gawad Urian Award for Best Actress; Nominated–FAP Award for Best Actress; Nominated–Young Critics Circle Award for Best Performance
1997	Mama Dito sa Aking Puso	Lucia	
1997	Babae	Beatrice Nakpil / Bea	Nominated–FAP Award for Best Actress; Nominated–Gawad Urian Award for Best Actress; Nominated–Young Critics Circle Award for Best Performance
1999	Sidhi	Ana / Ah	Nominated–FAP Award for Best Actress; Nominated–Gawad Urian Award for Best Actress

=== 2000-2020s ===
Year	Title	Role	Notes
2004	Naglalayag	Judge Dorinda Cortez vda. De Roces	Nominated–FAP Award for Best Actress; Nominated–Gawad Urian Award for Best Actress; Nominated–Young Critics Circle Award for Best Performance
2006	Carehome	Claudia	
2006	Ingrata	Bea	
2012	El Presidente	Maria Agoncillo	
2012	Thy Womb	Shaleha Sarail	Asian Film Award for Best Actress; Asia Pacific Screen Award for Best Actress; Gawad Urian Award for Best Actress; Metro Manila Film Festival Award for Best Actress; Young Critics Circle Award for Best Performance; Nominated–Asia Pacific Film Festival Award for Best Actress; Nominated–FAP Award for Best Actress
2013	Ang Kwento ni Mabuti	Mabuti de la Cruz	Nominated–Gawad Urian Award for Best Actress; Nominated–Young Critics Circle Award for Best Performance
2013	Barber's Tales	cameo	
2014	Hustisya (Justice)	Virginia 'Biring' Cabahug	Cinemalaya Film Festival Best Actress Award (Director's Showcase); Nominated–Asia Pacific Screen Award for Best Actress
2014	Dementia	Mara Fabre	St tropez International Film Festival Best Actress; GAwad Pasado Best Actress; Gawad Tanglaw Best Actress; Star Awards for Movies Best Actress; Nominated -Gawad Urian Best Actress; Nominated - Soho International Film Festival BestActing Performance
2014	When I Fall in Love	Fely Buenaventura	
2014	Kinabukasan	Ernest	short film
2015	Trap	Leonora Lariosa/Bebeth Rolyaston	
2016	Padre de Familia	Aida Santiago	Released in Europe
2016	Whistleblower	Zeny Juico Roblado	
2016	Laro	Flora Manalastas	
2016	Pare, Mahal Mo Raw AKo		
2016	Tuos	Pinailog	
2016	Kabisera	Mercy de Dios	
2016	Hinulid	Sita	
2020	Isa Pang Bahaghari	Iluminada "Lumen" Sanchez-delos Santos	Nominated–Metro Manila Film Festival Award for Best Actress; Nominated–PMPC Star Awards for Movies
2021	Kontrabida	Anita Rosales	
2022	Ligalig		
2023	Pieta	Rebecca	Star Awards for Movies Best Actress
2024	Isang Himala		Cameo appearance
2025	Mananambal	Lucia	Final film appearance

== Television ==
Year	Title / TV network	Role	Notes
1968	Oras ng Ligaya		
1968	Nora-Eddie Show	Herself	
1970	The Nora Aunor Show	Herself	
1971–1989	Superstar	Herself	*Won - Most Outstanding Variety; The Philippine Academy for Television Arts and Sciences (PATAS Awards) (1976); *Won - Best Female TV Host (Musical Variety); Star Awards for Television (Philippine Movie Press Club) (1987)
1971	Nora Cinderella	Herself	
1973	Makulay Na Daigdig ni Nora		*Won - Most Outstanding Television Actress; 1975 Philippine Academy for Television Arts and Sciences (PATAS Awards); *Won - Most Effective Television Actress; 1976 Philippine Academy for Television Arts and Sciences (PATAS Awards); *Won - Outstanding Performer; 1977 Philippine Academy for Television Arts and Sciences (PATAS Awards); *Won - Outstanding Drama Series; 1978 Philippine Academy for Television Arts and Sciences (PATAS Awards)
1984	La Aunor		
1989	Lovingly Yours, Helen		
1990	Superstar — The Legend	Herself	
1991	Maalaala Mo Kaya	Leni	Episode: "Lot 8 Blk. 13"
1992	Star Drama Presents — NORA		*Won - Best Actress Award; Star Awards for Television (Philippine Movie Press Club)
1993	Spotlight		*Won - Best Actress in a Single Performance; Star Awards for Television (Philippine Movie Press Club) for the episode: "Good Morning, Ma'am"
1994	Oki Doki Doc	Herself/Guest	
1995	Superstar — Beyond Time	Herself	
1997	Maalaala Mo Kaya		Episode: "Retaso"
2002	Nora Mismo (Ngayon na ang Oras ng Remedyo at Aksyon)	Herself	
2002	Maalaala Mo Kaya		Episode: "Lubid"
2002	Bituin	Laura Sandoval	The only ABS-CBN TV actress
2002	Morning Girls	Herself/Guest	
2003	Gold: A Birthday Concert Special	Herself	
2003	Magpakailanman	Sister Monica Sison	
2011	Sa Ngalan ng Ina	Governor Elena Toribio vda de. Deogracias	*Won - Best Actress; Star Awards for Television
2012	Enchanted Garden	Nana Sela / Queen Oleya	
2013	Never Say Goodbye	Marta Marasigan-Carpio	*Nominated - Best Actress; Star Awards for Television
2013	Untold Stories: Tukso Ng Pag-Ibig / TV5		*Nominated - Best Actress in a Single Performance; Star Awards for Television
2014	When I Fall in Love	Fely Buenaventura	*Nominated - Best Actress in a Single Performance; Star Awards for Television
2014	Trenderas	Celina Palomar	
2015	Karelasyon	Maring	
2015	Magpakailanman	Nancy Cañares	
2015	Pari 'Koy	Lydia	
2015	Little Nanay	Annie Batongbuhay	The first great-grandmother role
2016	Walang Tulugan with the Master Showman	Herself	
2016	Maalaala Mo Kaya	Yolly	Episode: "Kahon" Her return to ABS-CBN and Maalaala Mo Kaya after more than a decade.
2018	Eat Bulaga Lenten Special: A Daughter's Love	Tinay	
2018	Onanay	Nelia Dimagiba-Matayog	Her return to GMA Network after Little Nanay in 2015.
2020	Bilangin ang Bituin sa Langit	Mercedes "Cedes" Dela Cruz	
2024	Lilet Matias: Attorney-at-Law	Charito "Chato" Mercado	Her final television appearance before her death in 2025.

== Stage ==
Year	Title	Role	Theater company
1991	Minsa'y Isang Gamu-Gamo	Corazon de la Cruz	Philippine Educational Theater Association (PETA)
1993	DH (Domestic Helper)	Loida; Flor; Fe; Dolor	Philippine Educational Theater Association (PETA)
1994	Trojan Woman		Cecille Guidote-Alvarez’s Theater Company

== Films adapted to stage plays ==
Year	Title	Stage play cast	Theater company
1991	Minsa'y Isang Gamu-Gamo	Nora Aunor - Corazon de la Cruz	Philippine Educational Theater Association (PETA)
2003	Himala: The Musical	(original cast): May Bayot as Elsa; Isay Alvarez as Nimia; Cynthia Guico as Chayong, Dulce and Mia Bolanos alternating as Nanay Saling; Eladio Pamaran as Orly the film maker; Melvin Lee and Lionel Guico alternating as the priest	Philippine Educational Theater Association (PETA)
2013	Bona	Eugene Domingo as Bona; Edgar Allan Guzman as Gino Sanchez	Philippine Educational Theater Association (PETA)

== As a producer ==
=== Film ===
Year	Title	Notes
1973	Carmela	Producer - as Nora Villamayor
1973	Paru-Parong Itim	Producer
1973	Super Gee	Producer
1973	Ander di saya si Erap	Producer
1975	Banaue: Stairway to the Sky	Executive producer - as Nora Villamayor
1975	Niño Valiente	Producer
1975	Alkitrang Dugo	Producer
1976	Mrs. Teresa Abad Ako Po si Bing	Producer
1976	Wanted... Ded or Alayb	Producer
1976	Tatlong Taong Walang Diyos	Producer - as Nora Villamayor
1977	Tisoy	Producer - as Nora Villamayor
1978	Sa Lungga ng Mga Daga	Producer
1978	Roma - Amor	Producer
1979	Annie Batungbakal	Producer
1980	Bongga Ka Day	Producer
1980	Bona	Executive producer - as Nora Villamayor
1981	Ibalik ang Swerti	Producer - as Nora Villamayor
1981	Rock n' Roll	Producer
1984	Condemned	Executive producer - as Nora Villamayor
1986	Halimaw	Executive producer - as Nora C. Villamayor
1987	Tatlong Ina, Isang Anak	Producer
1987	Takot Ako, Eh!	Executive producer - as Nora C. Villamayor

=== Television ===
Year	Title	Notes
1971	Guy and Pip T.V. Special	Producer
1974	Ang Makulay Na Daigdig ni Nora	Producer / mini series
1977	Pipwede	Producer

== As a director ==
=== Film ===
Year	Title	Notes
1975	Niño Valiente	Director
1989	Greatest Performance (Note: The film was unreleased and its film reels were destroyed in a fire.)	Director

== See also ==
- List of awards and nominations received by Nora Aunor
