= Guy and Pip =

Philippine showbiz love team during 1960s

Guy and Pip is an appellation for the very popular Philippine cinema "love team" of Nora Aunor and Tirso Cruz III whose work in film, television and recording made them the most popular Philippine show business love team of all time. The nickname "Guy" refers to Aunor while "Pip" refers to Cruz. The team started working together in the late 1960s until the 1980s. At the peak of their popularity in the 1970s, they were able to make several movies with box-office successes, television shows, as well as radio programs, and their recordings were instant hits.

== Personal lives ==
Guy and Pip became real and for a while real partners, and this is what contributed to the success of the love team. Furthermore, the love team was made even more popular with their on-and-off relationship. Fans cried whenever the couple were at odds. Again and again, fans smirked and giggled when the couple were back in each other's arms. However, the love team remained a reel one, and it made a lot of their fans heartbroken—Aunor married her co-star in the movie Banaue, Christopher de Leon, on January 25, 1975, in a civil ceremony; the marriage brought a son, Ian Kristoffer de León, and two adopted daughters, Matet de Leon and Lotlot de Leon. The marriage did not last and was annulled in 1996. Meanwhile, Cruz was married to ramp model Lynn Ynchausti-Cruz on March 25, 1981; they had two sons, TJ and Bodie, and one daughter, Djanin.

== Early lives ==
Nora Aunor (born Nora Cabaltera Villamayor on May 21, 1953) was from Baryo San Francisco, Iriga, Camarines Sur in the Philippines' Bicol Region. She has nine more siblings, including Eddie Villamayor, a former actor. Aunor used to sell water along the train tracks of a Bicol Railway station at a young age. However, Aunor was gifted with a good voice and, since she was from an impoverished family, she used her voice to earn money by joining amateur singing contests in the region. Aunor became a Champion at the “Darigold Jamboree Singing Contest” singing her winning piece “You and the Night and the Music” and, after that, won in another singing contest, “The Liberty Big Show.” Aunor entered the national singing contest “Tawag ng Tanghalan” where she was defeated on her first try, but it did not stop the young Aunor to try again. On her second try, she eventually became a champion in the Grand National Finals on May 29, 1967, at the age of 14, where she sang “Moonlight Becomes You”.

Tirso Cruz III (born Tirso Silvano Cruz on April 1, 1952) is from the Cruz clan. The Cruz Family was popular in the Philippine entertainment industry as a family of singers and musicians who enjoyed playing instruments and composing songs. Being part of the Cruz clan, Tirso eventually joined show business and signed as a contract star of Sampaguita Pictures. He did several supporting roles. He was also a former talent of El Bodegon.

Aunor and Cruz were part of the movie 9 Teeners (1969), and Yeye Generation! (1969). These were the first time they worked together in movies, but they were first paired as a "love team" in Young Girl (1969). They were simultaneously launched as full stars in D' Musical Teenage Idols (1969) and Fiesta Extravaganza (1969), where both were mobbed by spectators.

== The "Love team" ==
Aunor and Cruz are critically acclaimed actors. In fact, Aunor is the most nominated and the most awarded actor in Philippine cinema and Cruz has his own share of acting awards. However, before they became award-winning actors, they started their careers making youth flicks and musical movies and eventually became a "love team". They were first paired as a love team in the movie Young Girl (1969); the movie did well at the box office and was just the start of many more box-office successes in decades of reign as the most popular Philippine love team of all time. What made the team very popular and well received was the unconventional pairing of Aunor and Cruz. Aunor is short and dark, while Cruz is tall and a "mestizo type", but fans loved them. Fans got hysterical with their singing together as they sweetly glanced at each other. Moreover, in those days, actresses were supposed to be fair in complexion, with aquiline nose, tall, and beautiful. Aunor stopped this trend when she entered the Philippine entertainment industry. Common people, especially the women from the provinces, could now relate their lives to Aunor's, that anybody could be like her. The love team became very popular and was accepted by the masses wholeheartedly. During their heyday as a love team, they made a total of 14 movies; most of them were youth-oriented and -themed, musical romances, and romantic comedies, with some drama movies. They were also the most-travelled love team in Philippine cinema's history, travelling to places like Japan, Hawaii and mainland USA to shoot for their movies. Aunor was also paired with several other young actors and singers in the '60s and '70s, including Manny de Leon, Edgar Mortiz, and Cocoy Laurel, amongst others, but it was the pair of Aunor and Cruz that stood out, giving them the moniker "Guy and Pip".

As they grew older, the genre of their movies also changed. From youth flicks to serious movies, from romantic-comedies to award-winning dramas. They first won their acting trophies in the movie And God Smiled at Me (1972). From 1970 to 1972 at the peak of their popularity, they were able to make 14 films including the movie Guy and Pip. Guy and Pip also made several long-playing (LP) albums together which were all smash hits and best-sellers. They did the Dream Come True album in 1971 and Mahal in 1978, both under the Vicor Music Corporation label. They also did a TV special called "Guy and Pip" which was seen by their fans around the Philippines.

They were also part of the radio program Operatang Putol-putol. The couple were also product endorsers of several local and international brands. In 1971, they endorsed Philips Transmitter Radio.

The last film they did together was Pinakasalan ko ang Aking Kapatid (1977), the last of the Guy and Pip love team, for now.

== Aunor's superstardom and the reunion of the love team ==
Just like any other team, both Aunor and Cruz outgrew theirs. As they aged, they could no longer make romantic-comedies the way they used to. Aunor eventually transformed herself into a "Class A actress," winning more awards locally and internationally. She had her own TV shows, legions of fans called “Noranians”, several product endorsements, and released hundreds of singles and dozens of albums and a lot of movies, making her the most popular star of all time. This was so phenomenal that Aunor's popularity rose to superstardom and the people gave her the moniker “Superstar,” for she was the only actor to have reached that status in the Philippine movie industry. She was also paired with several young dramatic actors in the following years, including Christopher de Leon, Bembol Roco, Phillip Salvador, Mat Ranillo III and even big stars like Fernando Poe Jr., Dolphy and now-former Philippine President Joseph Estrada. On the other hand, Cruz also made a name for himself in the Industry. He recorded several LP albums and did some movies, but these were not enough to equal the popularity of Aunor. Eventually, he did supporting roles and was sometimes portrayed as a villain. Guy and Pip, the love team, parted ways several years ago, but they remained friends, and none of their fans forgot the love team, hoping someday they will do a reunion movie together.

In 1985, the much-awaited reunion movie of Guy and Pip was released and produced by Regal Films. Titled Till we Meet Again it smashed the local box office of that year, making it one of the most successful reunion movies to date. Now in their 30s and several awards later, they were able to tackle their characters with maturity, but with the chemistry of the love team still the same, and the screams of the fans were still as deafening as ever.

== Box-office success ==
Guy and Pip made a lot of movies together and most of them were box-office hits. They started to draw lots of followers since the time of Young Girl (1969), D 'Musical Teenage Idols (1969) and Fiesta Extravaganza (1969) to My Blue Hawaii (1971), Winter Wonderland (1972) and a lot more; all of these were successful at the box office. Their reunion movie with Regal Films, Till We Meet Again (1985) was so successful at the box office that the producers decided to make two more movies, Mga Kwento ni Lola Basyang and Can't Stop Loving You that same year. The film Bilangin ang mga Bituin sa Langit was both critically acclaimed and successful at the box office. Both Guy and Pip played dual roles; these were very complex yet very effective roles which gave them several acting awards from the local award giving bodies.

However, if there is one movie that is the most successful of them all when it comes to the box office, that would be the Guy and Pip movie which was shown as part of the 1971 Manila Film Festival and was then the top grosser of the said festival. A lot of people came to watch the premiere night and some of the fans even stayed overnight in theaters to see the love team in person. Because of thousands of fans waiting for them, they needed to be put on top of a bus so that their screaming fans could see them; the movie was shown for more than six months and watched by more than 4 million people with gross earnings of more than 8 million pesos which at the time smashed all box office records. This figure is pale in comparison with today's movie earnings that now reach up to P300 million, but if based on ticket inflation, Guy and Pip would pound-for-pound be the highest-grossing film ever in the Philippines. If based on today's average ticket price of P165 (as of 2013, movie tickets in the Philippines ranged from P130 – P200), multiplied by 4 million, the number of people who watched the film Guy and Pip would have the movie gross-earning P660 million, making it the highest-grossing Filipino film adjusted for inflation ever.

== Maria Leonora Theresa ==
Maria Leonora Theresa
- First appearance: Maria Leonora Theresa (film)
- Last appearance: Pinoy Big Brother (season 2)

In-universe information
- Full name: Maria Leonara Theresa
- Gender: Female
- Family: Nora Aunor (mother); Tirso Cruz III (father)

Maria Leonora Theresa is a 3-foot, ceramic faced doll that became very popular because it was considered by many as the "daughter" of Guy and Pip. It is the only doll in Philippine showbiz history to have its own launching movie that people watched. Maria Leonora Theresa, or MLT to many, had its own contract for TV and movie appearance. This doll was treated as a human child who had her own wardrobe, jewelry sets, combs, sunglasses and even make-up kit. These items were given by the fans as well as the sponsors of Guy and Pip.

There were two versions on how MLT was born. The first version was that Cruz's mom, Mommy Elma, asked a friend to buy this doll in the United States. During the coronation of Aunor as the Muse of Sampaguita Family Club, Cruz sent the doll as a gift to Aunor, although he wasn't able to attend the said event. This is considered as MLT's birthday. The second version, according to “Tito Noy” Calderon, Cruz's publicist at that time, Cruz's father bought MLT at Aloha Hotel, a five-star hotel in Dewey Boulevard (now Roxas Boulevard). There is no confirmation of which of these two versions is the right one, but, one thing for sure, MLT became as popular as Mom and Dad.

During its popularity, frenetic fans of Guy and Pip really believed that the doll was alive and was the real daughter of the couple. The fanaticism of MLT's followers was even related in an excerpt from a paragraph of Wilfredo O. Pascual's Palanca-Award-winning essay, "Devotion".

MLT also had her own komiks magazine where she answered letters of fans; the magazine was published by Gold Star Publications.

MLT was so popular that everywhere she went, she got mobbed, At one time, to protect her from screaming fans, she was strategically placed on top of an armored truck. The fans were shrieking and shouting at the top of their voices and reached out to her as if she was royalty.

Also, through MLT fans could tell if Guy and Pip's relationship was fine and dandy or undergoing problems. When everything was all right, the doll would wear bright, sunshine colors. When the relationship was not good or when Guy and Pip had a fight, MLT would be dressed in black, and sometimes with a sash printed with “Nasaan ka, Inay?” (Where are you, Mom?)

When the love team (and relationship) of Guy and Pip ended, Nora gave back MLT to Cruz. MLT's last known public appearance was when Cruz's son Bodie was inside the Pinoy Big Brother's house as part of the Pinoy Big Brother (season 2) show.

== Later years ==
When I Fall In Love: Guy and Pip's 2014 telemovie

After their last movie project in the '80s, Guy and Pip, did not do any movies or TV special together. Aunor still maintained her status as the country's one and only "superstar," and Cruz did some supporting roles. In 2004, Aunor went to the United States to hold a series of concerts and sometimes had Cruz as her special guest. Aunor stayed in the United States for eight years. In 2011, Aunor went back to the Philippines after eight years of hiatus; she did a TV drama, Sa Ngalan ng Ina, the last directorial job of the late Mario O'Hara, and a movie with Brillante Mendoza entitled Thy Womb', which was an entry to the 2012 Venice International Film Festival. She won several international awards and nominations as well as local awards with the film. Aunor once again proved that she was still the best actress of the Philippines. She recently finished another indie movie, Ang Kwento Ni Mabuti, directed by award-winning director Mes De Guzman. Cruz, on the other hand, is very much visible in Philippine television and movies. He did several teleseryes (soap operas) in ABS-CBN and GMA Network, two of the biggest TV networks in the country. He had participation in ABS-CBN's teleserye Kailangan Ko’y Ikaw, as the character Rodrigo Manrique. He is also included in Huwag Ka Lang Mawawala, a teleserye starring Judy Ann Santos. Several movies he appeared in include Alfredo Lim: The Untold Stories, Sisterakas, In My Life, When I Met U, Mano Po 5: Gua Ai Di, Pacquiao The Movie, Can This Be Love, Bahay Ni Lola, Hiling, Pag-Ibig Ko Sa Yo Totoo, and Ibulong Mo Sa Diyos.

In 2013, TV5 announced that there will be a reunion TV series for Guy and Pip. The title of the show was When I Fall In Love. The show was directed by Joel Lamangan and premiered on February 11, 2014, as TV5's Valentine's Day offering. When I Fall In Love starred Guy and Pip as the Buenaventura couple, Fely and Armando, whose touching love story is told as the narration shifts to and fro in past and present events of their lives.

A year before their 40th wedding anniversary, Armando, a doctor, is diagnosed with Stage 4 pancreatic cancer. Resigned to the fact that his chances of recovery are slim, he chooses to spend the little time he has left with Fely and his three children: Ricky (Marc Abaya), Nica (Nadine Samonte), and Louie (Felix Roco). Armando, who tries to remain optimistic despite his illness, wishes to renew his marriage vows with Fely.

== Filmography ==
| Year | Title | Role | Film Production | Notes |
|---|---|---|---|---|
| 1969 | 9 Teeners | | VP Pictures | |
| 1969 | Banda 24 | | Baranggay Pictures, RJF Bros. Pictures | |
| 1969 | Halina Neneng ko | | JBC Productions | |
| 1969 | Oh, Delilah | Delilah | JBC Productions | |
| 1969 | Teenage Escapades! | | Tower Productions | |
| 1969 | YeYe Generation! | | VP Pictures | |
| 1969 | Young Girl | | Sampaguita Pictures | |
| 1969 | D' Musical Teenage Idols! | | Tower Productions | Aunor first starring role under Tower Productions |
| 1969 | Fiesta Extravaganza | | JBC Productions | This movie was released 3 days after her first starring movie role was released. |
| 1970 | Young Love | | VP Pictures | |
| 1970 | Orang | | Sampaguita Pictures | |
| 1970 | Nasaan ka, Inay? | | Sampaguita Pictures | Aunor received her first ever Best Actress nomination from the Citizens Council for Mass Media (CCMM) CAM Awards in 1971. |
| 1970 | The Young at Hearts | | Sampaguita Pictures; VP Productions | They starred along Rosemarie Sonora and Ricky Belmonte |
| 1970 | Hey There, Lonely Girl | | FGO Film Productions | |
| 1971 | Guy and Pip | Guy | Sampaguita Pictures | Highest-grossing film of 1971 Manila Film Festival |
| 1971 | Always in My Heart | Nora | Sampaguita Pictures | |
| 1971 | My Blue Hawaii | | Sampaguita Pictures | This movie was Sampaguita Pictures turn to give Nora Aunor and Tirso Cruz III a vacation in Honolulu, Hawaii. |
| 1972 | A Gift of Love | | Sampaguita Pictures & VP Productions | Nora received her first best actress nomination from Famas Awards |
| 1972 | Kung may Gusot, may Lusot | Bongbong | Sampaguita Pictures & VP Productions | |
| 1972 | Winter Holiday | Nora | Sampaguita Pictures | Filmed during the 1972 Winter Olympics in Japan. |
| 1972 | And God Smiled at Me | | Sampaguita Pictures | They first received their acting awards from Quezon City Film Festival |
| 1972 | Nora, Mahal Kita | Nora | Lea Productions | |
| 1972 | My Little Brown Girl | | Sampaguita Pictures & VP Productions | |
| 1973 | Maalaala mo Kaya? | | Sampaguita Pictures & VP Productions | |
| 1973 | Hindi kita Malimot | | Sampaguita Pictures & VP Productions | |
| 1975 | Memories of Our Love | | V&P Pictures | |
| 1976 | Magandang Gabi sa inyong Lahat | Anna Carballo | Premiere Productions | A Suspense- Horror Movie |
| 1977 | Pinakasalan ko ang Ina ng Aking Kapatid | | RS Productions | |
| 1978 | Mahal Mo, Mahal Ko | | RS Productions | They starred along with Christopher de Leon |
| 1985 | Till We Meet Again | Teresa | Regal Films | A reunion movie a box office hit. |
| 1985 | Mga kwento ni Lola Basyang | Sabel | Regal Films | Segment "Querubin: Maria Leonora Theresa". This the film adaptation of a popular radio drama series written by Severino Reyes in the 1950s. The film was a box office hit |
| 1985 | 'I Can't Stop Loving You | Amy Mercado | Regal Films | Top grosser of 1985 Metro Manila Film Festival |
| 1988 | Sana mahalin mo ako | Nora Aunor - Maria; Tirso Cruz III - Ramon | Regal Films | The movie was Box office success |
| 1988 | Penoy... Balut | | Regal Films | With Roderick Paulate |
| 1989 | Bilangin ang mga Bituin sa Langit | Nora Aunor - Noli/Maggie; Tirso Cruz III - Anselmo / Jun | Regal Films | This is the award-winning film of Guy and Pip. They received numerous acting awards from various award giving bodies in the Philippines. |
| 1993 | Inay | Nora Aunor; Tirso Cruz III | | Nora Aunor won the Young Critics Circle Best Performer |
| 2014 | When I Fall in Love | Nora Aunor - Fely; Tirso Cruz III - Armando | Studio5 | This is Guy and Pip's reunion project after several years. It is a movie made for television. |

== Discography ==
List of albums, Label and Track Listing
| Year | Album details | Label | Track Listing |
|---|---|---|---|
| 1971 | Dream Come True: Studio album; Released: 1971; Formats: LP, re-released: CD | Vicor Music Corporation (Philippines) | Together; Lorelie; You're my First Love; Just You; Hey Little Girl; Goin out of My Mind; Together Again; Just a Little Bit of your Love; There's Just Forever; Alphabeth Song; Everybody's Talking; Moonlight Becomes You |
| 1978 | Mahal: Studio album; Released: 1978; Formats: LP, re-released: CD | Vicor Music Corporation (Philippines) | Buhay ko Karugtong ng Buhay Mo (Duet); Pagsikat Ng Araw (Nora); Kailan Pa Kaya (Tirso); Paniwalaan (Duet); Walang Kapantay (Nora); Magpakailanman, Ikaw at Ako (Duet); Higpit ng Yakap (Nora); Ibigin Mo Ako (Tirso); Pangarap ng Pagibig (Duet); You're my Everything (Tirso) |
| 1985 | Till We Meet Again: Soundtrack album; Released: 1985; Formats: CD | | Till We Meet Again - Nora Aunor; Ikaw Pa Rin - Nora Aunor; Di Na Natuto - Tirso Cruz III; Pagibig - Nora Aunor; Together Again - Nora Aunor; Hindi Na Magbabago - Nora Aunor; Baby I Need Your Loving - Nora Aunor; Suddenly - Tirso Cruz III; Into The Groove - Nora Aunor |

== See also ==
- Nora Aunor
- Tirso Cruz III
