= List of awards and nominations received by Nora Aunor =

Nora Aunor awards and nominations
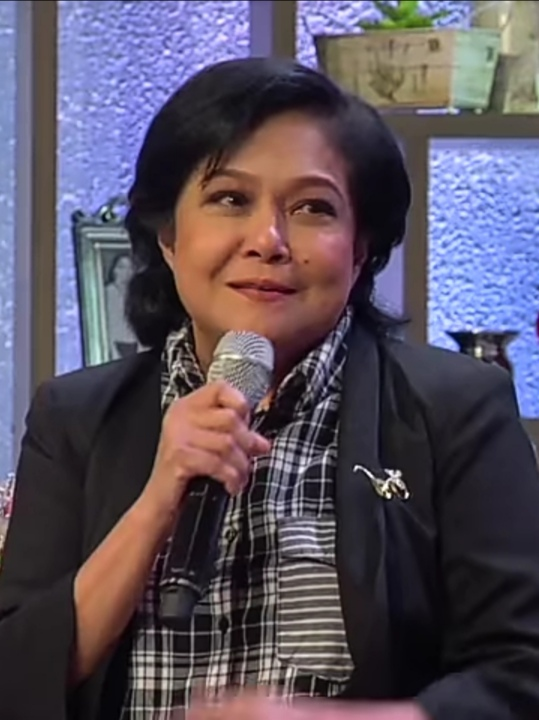
- Aunor in 2017
Awards and nominations
Award	Wins	Nominations
Arts and Culture Awards	13	13
ASEAN International Film Festival and Awards	1	1
Asian Film Award	1	2
Asia-Pacific Film Festival	-	1
Asia Pacific Screen Award	2	1
Aliw Awards	4	4
Ateneo Galian Awards	1	1
Awit Awards	6	6
Bacolod City Film Festival	1	1
BALATCA Awards	1	1
Box Office Entertainment Awards	9	9
Cairo International Film Festival	1	2
Cannes International Film Festival	1	1
Catholic Mass Media Awards	3	6
CineFilipino Film Festival	-	1
Cinemalaya Independent Film Festival	1	1
Cinemanila International Film Festival	2	2
Cinemalente Media and Film Festivall	1	1
Cinema One Originals Digital Film Festival	2	2
Citizen Council for Mass Media Awards	1	1
Davao City Film Festival	1	1
Dubai International Film Festival	-	1
East Asia Film and Television Awards	1	1
Entertainment Editor's Choice	1	1
FANTASPORTO - OPORTO INTERNATIONAL FILM FESTIVAL	-	1
FAMAS Awards	13	26
Feminist Centennial Film Festival, U.P.	1	1
Festival International du Film Indépendant de Bruxelles	1	1
Film Academy of the Philippines	5	14
FACINE	1	1
Fukuoka International Film Festival	-	1
Gawad Pasado	8	8
Gawad Tanglaw	4	4
Gawad Urian	10	21
Golden Screen Movie Awards	-	2
Golden Screen TV Awards	3	5
Gawad GENIO Awards	4	4
Indie Bravo Awards	3	3
International Film Festival of India	-	1
Katha Awards	1	1
Kritika Awards	1	1
Manila Film Festival	1	1
Metro Manila Film Festival Awards	8	15
Organisasyon ng Pilipinong Mang-aawit (OPM)	1	1
PATAS Awards	6	6
PMPC Star Awards for Film & TV	12	29
PMPC Star Awards for Music	3	3
Philippine Educational Theater Association	1	1
Philippine Recording Distributors Association (PREDA)	4	4
PUP Teatro Batangas Artistic Awards	1	1
Quezon City Film Festival	1	1
Reflection Awards	1	1
Sakhalin International Film Festival	1	2
Sangyaw Awards	1	1
Singapore International Film Festival	-	2
Singkwento International Film Festival	1	1
Sisa Award	1	1
Soho International Film Festival	-	1
St. Tropez International Film Festival	1	1
Urduja Film Festival	5	5
Venice Film Festival	1	1
Young Critics Circle Awards	5	13
Recognition from the Academe	10	10

Totals (Note: Certain award groups do not simply award one winner. They acknowledge several different recipients, have runners-up, and have third place. Since this is a specific recognition and is different from losing an award, runner-up mentions are considered wins in this award tally. For simplification and to avoid errors, each award in this list has been presumed to have had a prior nomination.)
- Wins: 210+
- Nominations: 255

This is a list of awards and nominations received by Nora Aunor. She has been awarded and nominated for her performances in film, television, stage and music which span 50 years.

Aunor has been awarded, recognized and received multiple nominations from different organizations, academe, institutions, critics and award giving bodies for her work in film, television, music and theater. She rose to prominence after winning the 1967 Tawag ng Tanghalan. She is the most nominated actress for the leading role in the long history of FAMAS Awards, having been nominated 17 times since 1973 when she was nominated for Gift of Love but only second to Eddie Garcia with 23 nominations both in leading and supporting role. With her fifth FAMAS Award for Best Actress in 1991, Aunor became the sixth performer to be elevated to the FAMAS Hall of Fame joining the likes of Eddie Garcia, Joseph Estrada, Charito Solis, Fernando Poe Jr. and Vilma Santos. This award is given to the person who won more than five times in its particular category. Aunor is the only performer in the long history of FAMAS Awards to be nominated for fifteen straight years, from 1973 to 1987.

As of 2017, Aunor is still the most nominated actress of Gawad Urian, with 21 nominations and seven wins, and the very first best actress awardee. She is also the most awarded and the most nominated actress of Metro Manila Film Festival, with eight best actress trophies, and from Young Critics Circle, with thirteen nominations and five wins. She is also the only actress to win the best actress trophy from the Film Academy of the Philippines for three straight years, a feat yet to be equaled or surpass by a Filipino actress.

In 1983, Aunor was recognized as one of The Outstanding Women in the Nation's Service (TOWNS) in the field of the arts. In 1999, Aunor received the Centennial Honors for the Arts awarded by the Cultural Center of the Philippines (CCP). She was the only film actress included in the list of awardees. In 2010, she was hailed by the Green Planet Movie Awards as one of the "10 Asian Best Actresses of the Decade". She received the Ani ng Dangal Award (Harvest of Honors). from the National Commission for Culture and the Arts in 2013, 2014 and 2016. In 2013, she received the Light of Culture Awards from Philippine Centre of the International Theatre Institute and the ITI-Earthsavers UNESCO Dream Center for pioneering in the integration of theater, television, and film. On September 17, 2015, Aunor was conferred the Gawad CPP para sa Sining for Film and Broadcast Arts, the highest award given by the Cultural Center of the Philippines. She was also conferred the Gusi Peace Prize in 2015.

Aunor has the most international best actress awards and nominations of any Filipino actors. She is the only Filipino actress to win international awards from five different continents: 19th Cairo International Film Festival in 1995 (Africa), 1st East Asia Film and Television Award in 1997, Asian Film Awards in 2013 and 3rd Sakhalin International Film Festival (Asia), 31st Festival International du Film Indépendant de Bruxelles in 2004, Premio Della Critica Indipendiente in 2013 and St. Tropez International Film festival in 2015 (Europe), Asia Pacific Screen Award in 2013 (Australia) and the Green Planet Movie Award (North America).

Aunor has the most lifetime achievement awards received locally and internationally for her contribution to film, television, music, and theater.

As of June 10, 2022, Aunor was conferred the Order of National Artists of the Philippines.

== State Honors ==
=== The Order of National Artists of the Philippines ===
Year	Award	Citation	Result	Ref
2022	National Artist	for Film and Broadcast Arts	Honored	

=== Presidential Medal of Merit ===
Year	Award	Citation	Result	Ref
2025	Presidential Medal of Merit	in recognition of her contribution to nation-building. (Posthumous)	Honored	

=== TOWNS Foundation ===
Year	Award	Citation	Result	Ref
1983	The Outstanding Women in the Nation's Service	For the field of Performing Arts	Honored	

=== Cultural Center of the Philippines (CCP) ===
Year	Award	Citation	Result	Ref
2016	Gawad CCP para sa Sining	for Film and Broadcast Arts	Honored	
1999	Centennial Honors for the Arts	As one of the 100 Outstanding Filipinos who have contributed in building the nation through Arts and Culture for the last 100 years.	Honored	

=== National Centennial Commission ===
Year	Award	Citation	Result
1999	Gawad Sentenaryo	Sektor ng Kababaihan, Sining at Kalinagan	Honored

=== National Commission for Culture & the Arts (NCCA) ===
Year	Award	Citation	Result
2016	Ani ng Dangal (Harvest of Honor)	brought honor to the country by winning in International Film Festivals	Honored
2014	Ani ng Dangal (Harvest of Honor)	brought honor to the country by winning in International Film Festivals	Honored
2013	Ani ng Dangal (Harvest of Honor)	brought honor to the country by winning in International Film Festivals	Honored

=== Office of the President (Philippines) ===
Year	Award	Citation	Result
1996	Parangal ng Bayan	Special International Citation Award	Honored
1995	Parangal ng Bayan	Grand Achievement Award	Honored

=== Philippine Center of the International Theatre Institute (PCITI)/ITI-Earthsavers UNESCO Dream Center ===
Year	Award	Citation	Result	Ref
2013	Lampara ng Kultura (Lights of Culture)	Lifetime Achievement Award for pioneering in the integration of theater, television, and film	Honored	

=== Patnubay ng Sining at Kalinangan - City of Manila ===
Year	Award	Citation	Result	Ref
2015	Diwa ng Lahi	For Cinema	Honored	

=== Gusi Peace Prize International ===
Year	Award	Citation	Result	Ref
2015	Gusi Peace Prize	International Excellence in Performing Arts Cinema	Honored	

== Recognition from the Academe ==
=== Far Eastern University ===
Year	Award	Citation	Result
2015	Alagad at Yaman ng Konkretong Obra; AYKON		Honored

=== National Teachers College ===
Year	Award	Citation	Result
2015	Natatanging Alagad ng Sining		Honored

=== De La Salle University ===
Year	Award	Citation	Result	Ref
2015	Gawad La Sallian para sa Sining		Honored	

=== Ateneo de Naga University ===
Year	Award	Citation	Result	Ref
2015	Bulawan na Bikolnon		Honored	

=== Bicol University ===
Year	Award	Citation	Result	Ref
2015	Pambansang Artista ng Bayan		Honored	

=== Polytechnic University of the Philippines ===
Year	Award	Citation	Result	Ref
2014	Natatanging Pagkilala Bilang Mahusay na Alagad ng Sining		Honored	

=== Quezon City Public Teachers Association (QCPTS)/ACT ===
Year	Award	Citation	Result	Ref
2014	Tunay na Alagad ng Sining		Honored	

=== University of the Philippines Diliman ===
Year	Award	Citation	Result	Ref
2014	Gawad Plaridel	For Film, Music and Television	Honored	

=== Holy Angel University ===
Year	Award	Citation	Result
2002	Trophy of Citation	For Her Accomplishments in the Performing Arts & Contribution to Philippine Society	Honored

=== Philippine Women's University Communications Department ===
Year	Award	Citation	Result
1995	Plaque of Recognition	International Achievement As An Actress	Honored

== International awards and recognition ==
=== Best Actress awards and nominations ===
Asian Film Awards (Hong Kong)
Year	Nominated work	Category	Result	Ref
2013	Thy Womb	Best Actress	Won	
2013	Thy Womb	People's Choice Awards for Favorite Actress	Nominated	

Asia Pacific Screen Awards (Australia)
Year	Nominated work	Category	Result
2014	Hustisya	Best Performance by an Actress	Nominated
2012	Thy Womb	Best Performance by an Actress	Won
2008	Himala	as part of the CNN APSA Viewers Choice Award for Best Asia-Pacific Film of all Time.	Won

Asia Pacific Film Festival (Macau)
Year	Nominated work	Category	Result
2012	Thy Womb	Best Actress	Nominated

Cairo International Film Festival(Egypt)
Year	Nominated work	Category	Result
1997	Bakit May Kahapon Pa?	Princess Pataten Statue for Best Actress	Nominated
1995	The Flor Contemplacion Story	Princess Pataten Statue for Best Actress	Won

Cannes International Film Festival (France)
Year	Nominated work	Category	Result
1981	Bona	Premio de la Juri de la Federacion International des Cine-Clubs; Certificate of Honor	Won

Dubai International Film Festival
Year	Nominated work	Category	Result
2012	Thy Womb	Best Actress	Nominated

East Asia Film and Television Award (Malaysia)
Year	Nominated work	Category	Result
1997	Bakit May Kahapon Pa?	Best Actress	Won

FANTASPORTO - OPORTO INTERNATIONAL FILM FESTIVAL ( Portugal)
Year	Nominated work	Category	Result
2015	Dementia	Best Actress	Nominated

24th Filipino International Cine Festival ( USA)
Year	Nominated work	Category	Result
2017	Hinulid	Best Actress	Won

31st Festival International du Film Indépendant de Bruxelles (Belgium)
Year	Nominated work	Category	Result
2004	Naglalayag	Best Actress	Won^{I}

Fukuoka International Film Festival (Japan)
Year	Nominated work	Category	Result
1996	The Flor Contemplacion Story	Best Actress	Nominated

Green Planet Movie Awards (Hollywood)
Year	Nominated work	Category	Result
2010		10 Asian Best Actresses of the Decade	Won

International Film Festival of India
Year	Nominated work	Category	Result
2012	Thy Womb	Best Actress	Nominated

Jinseo Arigato International Film Festival
Year	Nominated work	Category	Result
2024	Mananambal	Hall of Fame - International Best Actress	Won

3rd Sakhalin International Film Festival ( Russia)
Year	Nominated work	Category	Result
2013	Thy Womb	Best Actress	Won
2013	Thy Womb	Best Ensemble - Acting	Nominated

Singapore International Film Festival
Year	Nominated work	Category	Result
1999	Sidhi	Best Actress	Nominated
1997	Bakit May Kahapon Pa?	Best Actress	Nominated

Soho International Film Festival NYC (New York)
Year	Nominated work	Category	Result
2015	Dementia	Best Performer	Nominated

St.Tropez International Film Festival (France)
Year	Nominated work	Category	Result
2015	Dementia	Best Actress	Won

Venice International Film Festival (Italy)
Year	Nominated work	Category	Result
2012	Thy Womb	Premio Della Critica Indipendiente: Bisato d'Oro for Best Actress	Won

=== Lifetime achievement awards ===
19th Gawad Amerika Awards
Year	Nominated work	Category	Result	Ref
2016		International Lifetime Achievement Award for her contributions to Philippine Cinema	Honored	

Maharlika International Achievement Award
Year	Nominated work	Category	Result	Ref
2016		International Lifetime Achievement Award; Cinematic Excellence Pride of Maharlika Award	Honored	

Singkwento International Film Festival
Year	Nominated work	Category	Result	Ref
2016		Lifetime Achievement Award	Honored	

ASEAN International Film Festival and Awards
Year	Nominated work	Category	Result	Ref
2015		Lifetime Achievement Award	Honored	

Cinemanila International Film Festival
Year	Nominated work	Category	Result	Ref
2011		Lifetime Achievement Award (World Cinema)	Honored	
2000		Lifetime Achievement Award (Philippine Cinema)	Honored	

19th Reflection Awards
Year	Nominated work	Category	Result	Ref
2007		Milestones Lifetime Achievement Award	Honored	

== Movie awards and recognition ==
=== FAMAS (Filipino Academy of Movie Arts and Sciences Awards) ===
Year	Nominated work	Category	Result	Winner
2024	Pieta	Circle of Excellence	Honored	—N/a
2022	-	Ang Pambansang Alagad ng Sining	Honored	—N/a
2022	-	Susan Roces Celebrity Award	Honored	—N/a
2015	-	Iconic Movie Queen of Philippine Cinema	Honored	—N/a
2013	Thy Womb	Presidential Award for Cinematic Arts Excellence	Honored	—N/a
2011	-	Lifetime Achievement Award	Honored	—N/a
1996	The Flor Contemplacion Story	Circle of Excellence	Honored	—N/a
1992	-	Best Actress Hall of Fame	Honored	—N/a
1991	Andrea, Paano Ba ang Maging Isang Ina?	Best Actress	Won	—N/a
1990	Bilangin ang mga Bituin sa Langit	Best Actress	Won	—N/a
1987	I Love You Mama, I Love You Papa	Best Actress	Nominated	Dina Bonnevie (Magdusa)
1986	I Can't Stop Loving You	Best Actress	Nominated	Vivian Velez (Paradise Inn)
1985	Bulaklak sa City Jail	Best Actress	Won^{II}	—N/a
1984	Minsan, May Isang Ina	Best Actress	Nominated	Charito Solis (Don't Cry for me Papa)
1983	Mga Uod at Rosas	Best Actress	Nominated	Vilma Santos (Relasyon)
1983		Medallion of Excellence in Acting	Won	—N/a
1982	Bakit Bughaw ang Langit	Best Actress	Nominated	Vilma Santos (Pakawalan Mo Ako)
1981	Bona	Best Actress	Nominated	Amy Austria (Brutal)
1980	Ina ka ng Anak Mo	Best Actress	Won	—N/a
1979	Atsay	Best Actress	Nominated	Susan Roces (Gumising ka Maruja)
1978	Bakya Mo Neneng	Best Actress	Nominated	Susan Roces (Maligno)
1977	Tatlong Taong Walang Diyos	Best Actress	Won	—N/a
1976	Banaue: Stairway to the Sky	Best Actress	Nominated	Elizabeth Oropesa (Lumapit, Lumayo ang Umaga)
1975	Fe, Esperanza, Caridad	Best Actress	Nominated	Lolita Rodriguez (Tinimbang ka Ngunit Kulang)
1974	Paru-Parung Itim	Best Actress	Nominated	Gloria Sevilla (Gimingaw Ako)
1973	Gift of Love	Best Actress	Nominated	Vilma Santos (Dama de Noche); Boots Anson Roa (Tatay na si Erap)

- Nora Aunor was nominated for Best Actress for 15 straight years from 1973 - 1987. She was elevated to the Hall of Fame after winning her fifth (5th) Best Actress Award in 1991.

=== Gawad Urian (Manunuri ng Pelikulang Pilipino) ===
Year	Nominated work	Category	Result	Winner
2021	-	Best Actress of the Decade	Honored	
2017	Hinulid	Best Actress	Nominated	Hasmine Killip ( Pamilya Ordinaryo)
2016	Taklub	Best Actress	Nominated	LJ Reyes (Anino sa Likod ng Buwan)
2015		Natatanging Gawad Urian	Honored	
2015	Dementia	Best Actress	Nominated	Eula Valdez (Dagitab)
2014	Ang Kwento Ni Mabuti	Best Actress	Nominated	Angeli Bayani (Norte, Hangganan ng Kasaysayan)
2013	Thy Womb	Best Actress	Won	
2005	Naglalayag	Best Actress	Nominated	Judy Ann Santos (Sabel.)
2001	-	Best Actress of the Decade	Honored	
2000	Sidhi	Best Actress	Nominated	Elizabeth Oropesa (Bulaklak ng Maynila.)
1998	Babae	Best Actress	Nominated	Zsa Zsa Padilla (Batang PX.)
1997	Bakit May Kahapon Pa?	Best Actress	Won^{III}	
1996	The Flor Contemplacion Story	Best Actress	Won^{IV}	
1992	Ang Totoong Buhay ni Pacita M.	Best Actress	Nominated	Vilma Santos (Ipagpatawad Mo)
1991	Andrea, Paano Ba ang Maging Isang Ina?	Best Actress	Won	
1991	-	Best Actress of the Decade	Honored	
1990	Bilangin ang mga Bituin sa Langit	Best Actress	Won^{V}	
1985	'Merika	Best Actress	Nominated	Vilma Santos (Sister Stella L.)
1985	Bulaklak sa City Jail	Best Actress	Nominated	Vilma Santos (Sister Stella L.)
1983	Himala	Best Actress	Nominated	Vilma Santos (Relasyon)
1982	Bakit Bughaw ang Langit	Best Actress	Nominated	Gina Alajar ( Salome)
1981	Bona	Best Actress	Won^{VI}	
1980	Ina ka ng Anak Mo	Best Actress	Nominated	Charito Solis ( Ina, Kapatid, Anak)
1979	Ikaw ay Akin	Best Actress	Nominated	Beth Bautista ( Hindi Sa Iyo ang Mundo, Baby Porcuna)
1977	Tatlong Taong Walang Diyos	Best Actress	Won	

- Nora Aunor received the first-ever Best Actress Award from Gawad Urian. She is also the most nominated actress with 21 nominations to date.

=== Film Academy of the Philippines (Luna Awards) ===
Year	Nominated work	Category	Result	Winner
2013	Thy Womb	Best Actress	Nominated	Angel Locsin (One More Try)
2005	Naglalayag	Best Actress	Nominated	Claudine Barretto (Milan)
2000	Sidhi	Best Actress	Nominated	Elizabeth Oropesa (Bulaklak ng Maynila)
1998	Babae	Best Actress	Nominated	Maricel Soriano (Nasaan ang Puso)
1997	Bakit May Kahapon Pa?	Best Actress	Nominated	Sharon Cuneta (Madrasta)
1996	The Flor Contemplacion Story	Best Actress	Won	
1993	-	Lifetime Achievement Award	Honored	
1992	Ang Totoong Buhay ni Pacita M.	Best Actress	Won	
1991	Andrea, Paano Ba ang Maging Isang Ina?	Best Actress	Won	
1990	Bilangin ang mga Bituin sa Langit	Best Actress	Won	
1987	I Love You Mama, I Love You Papa	Best Actress	Nominated	Dina Bonnevie (Magdusa Ka)
1986	Tinik sa dibdib	Best Actress	Nominated	Nida Blanca (Miguelito)
1985	Bulaklak sa City Jail	Best Actress	Nominated	Sharon Cuneta (Sa Hirap at Ginhawa)
1983	Himala	Best Actress	Nominated	Vilma Santos (Relasyon)

- Nora Aunor is the youngest recipient of the Lifetime Achievement Award. She is also the only Filipino actress to win three successive best actress awards (1990,1991,1992)and has the most wins with four (4) tied with Vilma Santos and Lorna Tolentino

=== Awards from the press ===
PMPC Star Awards for Movies
Year	Nominated work	Category	Result	Winner
2024		Special Citation; Dekada Award	Honored	
2024	Pieta	Best Actress	Won	Tied with Vilma Santos (When I Met you in Tokyo); Maricel Soriano (In His Mother's Eyes)
2024	Pieta	Indie Movie Ensemble Acting of the Year	Won	
2022	Isa Pang Bahaghari	Best Actress	Nominated	Alessandra De Rossi (Watchlist)'; Sylvia Sanchez (Coming Home)'
2022	Isa Pang Bahaghari	Movie Ensemble Acting of the Year	Won	
2017	Kabisera	Special Citation; Ginintuang Bituin Ng Pelikulang Pilipino	Honored	
2017	Kabisera	Best Actress	Won	Tied with Vilma Santos (Everything About Her)
2016	Taklub	Best Actress	Nominated	Bea Alonzo (A Second Chance)
2015	Dementia	Best Actress	Won	
2014	Ang Kwento Ni Mabuti	Best Actress	Nominated	KC Concepcion (Boy Golden: Shoot to Kill, the Arturo Porcuna Story)
2013	Thy Womb	Best Actress	Nominated	Angel Locsin (One More Try)
2009		Special Citation; Global Achievement for Cinematic Excellence for the movie Himala	Honored	
2005		Best Actress of the Decade	Honored	
2007	Care Home	Best Actress	Nominated	Judy Ann Santos (Kasal, Kasali, Kasalo)
2000	Sidhi	Best Actress	Nominated	Elizabeth Oropesa (Bulaklak ng Maynila)
1998	Babae	Best Actress	Nominated	Zsa Zsa Padilla (Batang PX)
1997	Bakit May Kahapon Pa?	Best Actress	Nominated	Sharon Cuneta (Madrasta)
1996	The Flor Contemplacion Story	Best Actress	Won	
1995		Best Actress of the Decade	Honored	
1992	Ang Totoong Buhay ni Pacita M.	Best Actress	Won	
1991	Andrea, Paano Ba ang Maging Isang Ina?	Best Actress	Won	
1990	Bilangin ang mga Bituin sa Langit	Best Actress	Nominated	Vilma Santos (Pahiram ng isang Umaga)
1987	I Love You Mama, I Love You Papa	Best Actress	Nominated	Jaclyn Jose (Itanong mo sa Buwan)
1986	Tinik sa dibdib	Best Actress	Nominated	Nida Blanca (Miguelito)
1985	'Merika	Best Actress	Won	
1985	Bulaklak sa City Jail	Best Actress	Nominated	She won Best Actress for 'Merika
1985	Condemned	Best Actress	Nominated	She won Best Actress for 'Merika

- Nora Aunor received the first Best Actress Star Award from the Philippine Movie Press Club (PMPC). She is also the only actor to receive triple nominations in one award season.

Gawad GENIO Awards
Year	Nominated work	Category	Result
2013	Thy Womb	Best Film Actress	Won
2013	Thy Womb	International Excellence Awardee	Won
2015	Dementia	Best Film Actress	Won
2015	Hustisya	Best Film Actress	Won

- Nora Aunor made a significant mark in the history of the Gawad GENIO Awards for winning Best Film Actress in two separate movies (Dementia and Hustisya) in 2015.

Golden Screen Awards (ENPRESS)
Year	Nominated work	Category	Result
2013	Thy Womb	Best Performance by an Actress in a Lead Role-Drama	Nominated
2012		Gawad Lino Brocka Lifetime Achievement Award	Won
2011		Movie Icon of Our Time	Won
2005	Naglalayag	Best Performance by an Actress in a Lead Role-Drama	Nominated

Entertainment Editors Choice (EDDYS)
Year	Nominated work	Category	Result
2018		Film Icon Award	Won
2017	Tuos	Best Actress	Nominated

=== Film festival awards ===
Metro Manila Film Festival
Year	Nominated work	Category	Result
2020	Isa Pang Bahaghari	Best Actress	Nominated
2019		Hall of Fame	Honored
2016	Kabisera	Best Actress	Nominated
2012	Thy Womb	Best Actress	Won
1996		Plaque of Recognition for Winning in the Cairo Film Festival	Honored
1995	Muling Umawit ang Puso	Best Actress	Won
1993	Inay	Best Actress	Nominated
1992		Gawad ng Natatanging Pagkilala	Honored
1991	Ang Totoong Buhay ni Pacita M.	Best Actress	Won
1990	Andrea, Paano Ba ang Maging Isang Ina?	Best Actress	Won
1985	I Can't Stop Loving You	Best Actress	Nominated
1984	Bulaklak sa City Jail	Best Actress	Won
1982	Himala	Best Actress	Won
1981	Rock n Roll	Best Actress	Nominated
1980	Bona	Best Actress	Nominated
1980	Kung Ako'y Iiwan Mo	Best Actress	Nominated
1979	Ina ka ng Anak Mo	Best Actress	Won
1978	Atsay	Best Performer	Won
1977	Bakya mo Neneng	Best Actress	Nominated
1976	Minsa'y isang Gamu-gamo	Best Actress	Nominated

- Nora Aunor is the first and only Best Performer awardee of the Metro Manila Film Festival; it is equivalent to Best Actor, Best Actress, Best Supporting Actor and Actress Award. She is also the most awarded recipient of the Best Actress Award with 8 wins.

Cinemalaya Independent Film Festival
Year	Nominated work	Category	Result
2014	Hustisya	Best Actress	Won
2014	Hustisya	Bruns Critics Choice for Best Performer	Won

Cinema One Originals Digital Film Festival
Year	Nominated work	Category	Result
2011		Special Honorary Award; For her pioneering efforts in independent cinema	Honored
2009		Cinema One Legend	Honored

Manila Film Festival
Year	Nominated work	Category	Result
2004	Naglalayag	Best Actress	Won

Davao City Film Festival
Year	Nominated work	Category	Result
1976	Ibilanggo Si Neneng Magtanggol	Best Actress	Won

(Grand Buglas Award)- Bacolod Film Festival
Year	Nominated work	Category	Result
1975	Banaue: Stairway to the Sky	Best Actress	Won

Quezon City Film Festival
Year	Nominated work	Category	Result
1972	And God Smiled at Me	Best Actress	Won

Feminist Centennial Film Festival, U.P.
Year	Nominated work	Category	Result
2005		Outstanding Achievement in Film Acting	Won

CineFilipino Film Festival
Year	Nominated work	Category	Result
2013	Ang Kwento Ni Mabuti	Best Actress	Nominated

8th Cinemalente Media and Film Festival
Year	Nominated work	Category	Result
2017	Kabisera	Best Actress	Won

Urduja Film Festival
Year	Nominated work	Category	Result
2017	Hinulid	Best Actress	Won
2017	Tuos	Best Actress	Won
2016	Taklub	Best Actress	Won
2015	Dementia	Best Actress	Won
2015		Espada ni Urduja; Lifetime Achievement Award	Won

=== Critics' awards ===
Young Critics Circle
Year	Nominated work	Category	Result	Winner
2017	Tuos*	Best Performance by Male or Female, Adult or Child, Individual or Ensemble in Leading or Supporting Role	Nominated*	Laila Putli P. Ulao (Women of the Weeping River)
2016	Taklub	Best Performance by Male or Female, Adult or Child, Individual or Ensemble in Leading or Supporting Role	Nominated	Lou Veloso (Da Dog Show)
2014	Ang Kwento Ni Mabuti	Best Performance by Male or Female, Adult or Child, Individual or Ensemble in Leading or Supporting Role	Nominated	Carlo Aquino (Porno); Jhong Hilario (Badil)
2013	Thy Womb	Best Performance by Male or Female, Adult or Child, Individual or Ensemble in Leading or Supporting Role	Won	
2005	Naglalayag	Best Performance by Male or Female, Adult or Child, Individual or Ensemble in Leading or Supporting Role	Nominated	Dennis Trillo (Aishite Imasu: Mahal Kita 1941); Jomari Yllana (Minsan Pa)
1998	Babae	Best Performance by Male or Female, Adult or Child, Individual or Ensemble in Leading or Supporting Role	Nominated	Patrick Garcia (Batang PX)
1997	Bakit May Kahapon Pa?	Best Performance by Male or Female, Adult or Child, Individual or Ensemble in Leading or Supporting Role	Nominated	Christopher de Leon (Madrasta)
1996	The Flor Contemplacion Story	Best Performance by Male or Female, Adult or Child, Individual or Ensemble in Leading or Supporting Role	Won	
1996	Muling Umawit ang Puso	Best Performance by Male or Female, Adult or Child, Individual or Ensemble in Leading or Supporting Role	Nominated	
1994	Inay	Best Performance by Male or Female, Adult or Child, Individual or Ensemble in Leading or Supporting Role	Won^{VII}	
1992	Ang Totoong Buhay ni Pacita M.	Best Performance by Male or Female, Adult or Child, Individual or Ensemble in Leading or Supporting Role	Won^{VIII}	
1991	Andrea, Paano Ba ang Maging Isang Ina?	Best Performance by Male or Female, Adult or Child, Individual or Ensemble in Leading or Supporting Role	Won	

- For Tuos, Nora Aunor has double nomination; for single performance and Duo Performance
- Nora Aunor received the very first Best Performer Award, She is also the most nominated with thirteen nominations and the winningest performer with 5 wins.

Annual Brun Film Awards (Critics Choice)
Year	Nominated work	Category	Result
2015	Hustisya	Best Performance by a Male or Female in a Leading Role	Nominated
2014	Ang Kwento Ni Mabuti	Best Female Actor - Leading Role	Nominated

KRITIKA Awards
Year	Nominated work	Category	Result
1991	Ang Totoong Buhay ni Pacita M.	Best Actress	Won

Gawad Tangi for Films (Kritiko ng Pelikula, Telebisyon at Musikang Pilipino)
Year	Nominated work	Category	Result
2014	Ang Kwento Ni Mabuti	Best Actress	Nominated
2013	Thy Womb	Best Actress	Won

=== Awards from the Academe ===
Ateneo Galian Awards
Year	Nominated work	Category	Result
1992	Ang Totoong Buhay ni Pacita M.	Best Actress	Won

'BALATCA (Batangas Laguna Teachers Association for Culture and the Arts)
Year	Nominated work	Category	Result
2013	Thy Womb	Pambansang Dangal ng Sining sa Pagganap	Won
2005		Dakilang Kayumangging Lahi Award	Won
2005	Naglalayag	Best Actress	Won

- Aunor was the first recipient of the Best Actress Award

Gawad PASADO (Pampelikulang Samahan ng mga Dalubguro)
Year	Nominated work	Category	Result
2016		Best Actress Hall of Fame	Honored
2015	Hustisya	Pinakapasadong Aktres	Won
2015	Dementia	Pinakapasadong Aktres	Won
2014	Ang Kwento Ni Mabuti	Pinakapasadong Aktres	Won^{IX}
2013	Thy Womb	Pinakapasadong Aktres	Won
2010		Pinakapasadong Dakilang Artista ng Bayan	Won
2009		Pinakapasadong Artista sa Lahat ng Panahon	Won
2005	Naglalayag	Pinakapasadong Aktres	Won

Gawad TANGLAW
Year	Nominated work	Category	Result
2015	Dementia	Kapuripuring Aktres	Won^{X}
2013	Thy Womb	Kapuripuring Aktres	Won
2012		Pinaka Kapuri-puring Artista ng Dekada	Won
2005	Naglalayag	Kapuripuring Aktres	Won

GEMS: Hiyas ng Sining
Year	Nominated work	Category	Result
2021	Isa Pang Bahaghari	Best Performance by an Actress	Won

=== People's Choice Awards ===
Film Academy of the Philippines
Year	Nominated work	Category	Result
2005	Naglalayag	Cyber choice for Best Actress	Won
2005	Naglalayag	Texter's Choice for Best Actress	Won

S Magazine
Year	Nominated work	Category	Result
2004	Naglalayag	Best Actress	Won

Movie Magazine Awards
Year	Nominated work	Category	Result
1996	The Flor Contemplacion Story	Best Actress	Won
1992	Ang Totoong Buhay ni Pacita M.	Best Actress	Won
1991	Andrea, Paano Ba ang Maging Isang Ina?	Best Actress	Won

People's Choice (PPC Publication)
Year	Nominated work	Category	Result
1998	Babae	Best Actress	Won
1996	The Flor Contemplacion Story	Best Actress	Won

Parade Magazine Awards
Year	Nominated work	Category	Result
1983	Himala	Best Actress	Won

Let's Talk Movies Awards
Year	Nominated work	Category	Result
1983	Himala, Annie Sabungera and Palengke Queen	Best Actress	Nominated

Philippine Edition Movie Awards
Year	Nominated work	Category	Result
2014	Ang Kwento Ni Mabuti	Favorite Indie Actress - Drama	Won
2013	Thy Womb	Favorite Actress - Drama	Won
2013	El Presidente	Favorite Movie Supporting Actress	Won

Annual Brun Film Awards (Readers Choice)
Year	Nominated work	Category	Result
2015	Hustisya	Best Performance by a Male or Female in a Leading Role	Won
2014	Ang Kwento Ni Mabuti	Best Female Actor - Leading Role	Won

=== Box Office Awards ===
Guillermo Mendoza Memorial Foundation
Year	Nominated work	Category	Result
2019		Corazon Samaniego Lifetime Achievement Award	Won
1996	The Flor Contemplacion Story	Box Office Queen	Won
1983		Queen of Philippine Movies	Won
1981		Box Office Queen	Won
1973		Miss Republic of the Philippines Movies	Won
1971		Box Office Queen	Won

Spotlight Promotions
Year	Nominated work	Category	Result
1971	Guy and Pip	Box Office Queen	Won

=== Others ===
Catholic Mass Media Awards
Year	Nominated work	Category	Result
1996	The Flor Contemplacion Story	St. Lorenzo Ruiz citation	Won
1990	Bilangin ang mga Bituin sa Langit	Best Actress	Nominated
1984	Bulaklak sa City Jail	Best Actress	Won
1982	Himala	Best Actress	Nominated
1981	Bakit Bughaw ang Langit	Best Actress	Won
1979	Ina ka ng Anak Mo	Best Actress	Nominated

Philippine Daily Inquirer's Indie Bravo Awards
Year	Nominated work	Category	Result
2014	Thy Womb	Special Recognition; Artists who have received awards for their works in festivals here and abroad.	Won
2013	Thy Womb	Special Recognition; Artists who have received awards for their works in festivals here and abroad.	Won

ref:

Philippine Psychiatric Association's (PPA) Sisa Media Awards
Year	Nominated work	Category	Result
2014	Thy Womb	Outstanding Female Character in a Mainstream Filipino Film	Won

Sangyaw Awards ( Tacloban City)
Year	Nominated work	Category	Result
2015	Taklub	Outstanding Actress	Won

Citizens' Council for Mass Media Awards
Year	Nominated work	Category	Result
1971	Nasaan ka Inay?	Best Actress	Nominated

- Aunor's first Best Actress nomination

== Television awards and recognition ==
=== Golden Screen TV Awards (ENPRESS) ===
Year	Nominated work	Category	Result
2015	When I Fall In Love	Outstanding Performance by An Actress in a Single Drama/Telemovie Program	Won
2013		Helen Vela Lifetime Achievement Award - DRAMA	Won
2012	Sa Ngalan ng Ina	Outstanding Performance by An Actress in a Drama Series	Nominated
2005		Helen Vela Lifetime Achievement Award	Won

=== Philippine Academy for Television Arts and Sciences (PATAS Sinag Awards) ===
Year	Nominated work	Category	Result
1978	Makulay na Daigdig ni Nora	Outstanding Producer of Best Drama Series	Won
1978	Makulay na Daigdig ni Nora	Outstanding Drama Series	Won
1977	Makulay na Daigdig ni Nora	Outstanding Performer	Won
1976	Superstar	Most Outstanding Variety Show	Won
1976	Makulay na Daigdig ni Nora	Most Effective Television Actress	Won
1975	Makulay na Daigdig ni Nora	Most Outstanding Television Actress	Won

=== Star Awards for Television (Philippine Movie Press Club) ===
Year	Nominated work	Category	Result
2019	Onanay / GMA Network	Best Drama Actress	Nominated
2016	Maalaala Mo Kaya: Kahon / ABS-CBN	Best Actress in a Single Performance	Nominated
2015	Karelasyon: Tres Rosas / GMA Network	Best Actress in a Single Performance	Nominated
2014	When I Fall in Love / TV5	Best Actress in a Single Performance	Nominated
2013	Never Say Goodbye / TV5	Best Drama Actress	Nominated
2013	Untold Stories: Tukso Ng Pag-Ibig / TV5	Best Actress in a Single Performance	Nominated
2012	Sa Ngalan ng Ina / TV5	Best Drama Actress	Won^{XI}
2004	Magpakailanman :Silang Mga Inihabilin ng Langit / GMA Network	Best Actress in a Single Performance	Nominated
2003	Maalaala Mo Kaya :Lubid / ABS-CBN	Best Actress in a Single Performance	Nominated
2003	Bituin / ABS-CBN	Best Drama Actress	Nominated
2001		Ading Fernando Memorial Lifetime Achievement Award	Honored
1997		Vic Silayan Memorial Award	Honored
1994	Spotlight: Good Morning, Ma'am / GMA Network	Best Actress in a Single Performance	Won
1993	Star Drama Theater Presents: Nora / ABS-CBN	Best Drama Actress	Won
1987	Superstar Show / RPN 9	Best Female TV Host, Musical Variety	Won^{XII}

=== Other TV awards ===
Gawad Tangi for Television (Kritiko ng Pelikula, Telebisyon at Musikang Pilipino)
Year	Nominated work	Category	Result
2013	Untold Stories: Tukso Ng Pag-Ibig / TV5	Best Single Performance by an Actress	Nominated
2012	Sa Ngalan ng Ina	Best Actress	Won

GEMS: Hiyas ng Sining
Year	Nominated work	Category	Result
2021	Bilangin ang Bituin sa Langit	Best Performance by an Actress in a TV Series	Nominated

Golden Laurel/ LPU Batangas Media Awards
Year	Nominated work	Category	Result
2019	Onanay / GMA Network	Best TV Actress	Nominated

== Theater awards and recognition ==
=== Aliw Awards ===
Year	Nominated work/Recipient	Category	Result
2013	Nora Aunor	Lifetime Achievement Award (Music)	Won
2019	Nora Aunor	Lifetime Achievement Award (Movies)	Won
1999	Nora Aunor	Gawad Siglo as One of the 50 Best Live Entertainers of the Century	Won
1984	Nora Aunor	Gallery of Distinction	Won

=== Philippine Educational Theater Association (PETA) ===
Year	Nominated Work/Recipient	Category	Result	Ref.
2012	Nora Aunor	Certificate of Recognition	Won	

=== PUP Teatro Batangas Artistic Awards ===
Year	Nominated Work	Category	Result
1995	"Minsa'y isang Gamu-gamo" and "DH"	Most Outstanding Stage Actress	Won

== Music awards and recognition ==
=== Awit Awards ===
Year	Nominated work/Recipient	Category	Result	Ref.
1998	Nora Aunor	Dangal ng Musikang Pilipino – Lifetime Achievement Award	Won	
1996	Kahit na Konting Awa	Best Interpreter of Movie Theme Song	Won	
1971	The Phenomenal Nora Aunor	Album of the Year	Won	
1971	Nora Aunor	Best Female Singer (English)	Won	
1970	Nora Aunor	Best Female Singer (English)	Won	
1969	Nora Aunor	Best New Recording Artist	Won	

- The first award ceremony was organized by the Awit Awards Executive Committee. After that, the Philippine Academy of Recording Arts and Sciences (PARAS) took charge the next 2 years. Since 1989, it was spearheaded by PARI (The Philippine Association of the Record Industry, Inc.)

=== Katha Award ===
Year	Nominated work	Category	Result
1995	Maliit Man sa Tingin	Best Country Folk Singer	Won

=== Organisasyon ng Pilipinong Mang-aawit (OPM) ===
Year	Nominated work/Recipient	Category	Result
2011	Nora Aunor	Dangal ng OPM Award	Won

=== Philippine Recording Distributors Association (PREDA) ===
Year	Nominated work/Recipient	Category	Result
1973	Nora Aunor	Top Selling Records; Female Singer of the Year (Tagalog Version)	Won
1973	Nora Aunor	Top Selling Records; Female Singer of the Year (English Version)	Won
1971	Nora Aunor	Female Singer of the Year	Won
1969	Nora Aunor	Best New Recording Artist of the Year	Won

=== Star Awards for Music (Philippine Movie Press Club) ===
Year	Nominated work/Recipient	Category	Result	Ref
2011	Nora Aunor	Lifetime Achievement Award	Won	
2011	Nora Aunor	One of 15 OPM Icons	Won	
2011	Nora Aunor	Female Celebrity of the Night	Won	

== Awards from government agencies, civic organization and private entities ==
- 2015 - Best Actress, Dementia - 1st Urduja Heritage Film Awards - Province of Pangasinan
- 2015 - ANG ESPADA NI URDUJA - Kampeon ng Sining ng Pelikula Lifetime Achievement Award - 2015 Urduja Film Festival, Province of Pangasinan - October 15, 2015
- 2015 - Diwa ng Lahi Award Patnubay ng Sining at Kalinangan 2015 - 444th Araw ng Maynila
- 2015 - Senate Resolution No. 1270 Congratulating & Commending for her ASEAN IFF Lifetime Ach. Award - filed by Sen. Lito Lapid - Senate of the Philippines - May 19, 2015
- 2015 - Gawad Lasallian Para Sa Sining - De La Salle University - April 27, 2015
- 2015 - Outstanding Asian Actress & Movie Icon, 26th Asia Pacific Excellence Awards - April 9, 2015, AFP Theatre
- 2015 - Bulawan ng Bikolnon Service Award, Ateneo de Naga University
- 2015 - Honorary Nagueña - Naga City, Bicol
- 2015 -ONRA Citation (Bicol term for Honor) - given by Ako Bicol Partylist - Bicol University, Legazpi City, Albay. March 24, 2015
- 2015 - Pambansang Artista ng Bayan, Communications Dept, Bicol University - Legazpi City, Albay, March 24, 2015
- 2014 - Honorary Paoayan - Paoay, Ilocos Norte, March 2014
- 2014 - Pinakamagaling na Aktres sa Kasaysayan ng Pelikulang Pilipino - 1st Inding Indie Short Film Festival - Nat'l Press Club - Dec. 15, 2014
- 2014 - Overseas Filipino Worker's Choice as National Artist - 4th OFW Gawad Parangal - Dec. 12, 2014
- 2014 - Manuel L. Quezon Gawad Parangal, One of the 12 Outstanding Citizens of Q.C. - 75th Foundation Day - October 12, 2014.
- 2014 - Artista ng Mamamayan - Far Eastern University (FEU), Sept. 3, 2014, FEU
- 2014 - Natatanging Pagkilala Bilang Mahusay na Alagad ng Sining - Polytechnic University of the Philippines (PUP) - August 29, 2014, PUP, Manila
- 2014 - Tunay na Alagad ng Sining - Quezon City Public Teachers Association (QCPTS)/ACT - Quezon City Day, August 19, 2014, R. Magsaysay High School, Cubao, QC
- 2014 - Numero Uno Cinema One Icon Award - Cinema One 20th Anniversary - August 3, 2014, Samsung Hall, SM Aura
- 2014 - Artista ng Bayan - Gabriela, July 3, 2014
- 2014 - PEPster's Female Showbiz Treasure of the Year - PEP - May 20, 2014, Solaire Resort and Casino
- 2014 - Plaque of Appreciation - As Special Guest of Honor, Unveiling & Dedication Ceremony Letras Y Figuras de Bustos, Municipality of Bustos, Bulacan - April 7, 2014
- 2013 - People of the Year - People Asia Magazine
- 2013 - Special Recognition - 4th Indie Bravo Awards - Philippine Daily Inquirer
- 2013 - Thespic Excellence Award - Lyceum of the Philippines University - Batangas
- 2013 - Film Prize Award - 1st Kakulay Entertainment Showcase Awards
- 2013 - Gold Excellence Award - 1st Kakulay Entertainment Showcase Awards
- 2013 - Top Icon Awardee - 1st Kakulay Entertainment Showcase Awards
- 2013 - Best Female Artist (Veteran Category) - Pasikatan 2013 - Cinema One Global
- 2012 - 100 Most Beautiful Stars - Yes Magazine
- 2012 - Pinoy of the Year (2012) - VoicePoints Social Media Awards
- 2012 - Star of the Night - 38th Metro Manila Film Festival
- 2012 - Special Recognition - 3rd Indie Bravo Awards - Philippine Daily Inquirer
- 2011 - Asia's Female Entertainer, Icon of the Philippines - 13th Annual Global Excellence Award
- 2011 - Originals in Philippine Cinema - 7th Cinema One Originals Digital Film Festival
- 2009 - One of 15 Cinema One Legends - 5th Cinema One Originals Digital Film Festival
- 2007 - Milestone Lifetime Achievement Award - 19th Reflections Awards - Los Angeles, California, USA
- 2006 - Certificate of Recognition (Phenomenal Talent & Extraordinary Performer) - Office of the Governor, Las Vegas, USA
- 2006 - Plaque of Appreciation - Nora Aunor Day - September 23, 2006 - Office of the Mayor, Killeen City, Texas, USA
- 2004 - Plaque of Appreciation - Nora Aunor Day - May 21, 2004 - Office of Mayor Gavin Newsom, San Francisco City, California USA
- 2002 - Trophy of Citation For Her Accomplishments in the Performing Arts & Contribution to Phil. Society - Holy Angel University, Pampanga
- 2001 - Entertainment's Tough 40 - One of the 40 Most Powerful Celebrities - Solid Link Corp.
- 2001 - Best Female Entertainer for Superstar Beyond Time - 3rd Celebrity Award, Burbank Casways
- 1999 - Outstanding Film, Stage Actress & Artist - Sumagang Award - Iriga's 31st Charter Foundation Anniversary
- 1999 - Gawad Sentenaryo, Sektor ng Kababaihan, Sining at Kalinangan - National Centennial Commission
- 1997 - Plaque of Appreciation For Her Invaluable Contributions to the Phil. Entertainment Industry - Araneta Center
- 1997 - Haligi ng Industriya Award - Film Development Foundation of the Philippines
- 1997 - National Music Festival Award - Sandiwa Philippines
- 1997 - Certificate of Appreciation as Guest Artist for Pasko '97 - Department of Foreign Affairs
- 1997 - People's Award, Filipino Community - Waseda University, Tokyo, Japan
- 1996 - Plaque of Recognition - Eastern Telecommunications (Eastern Cable) Philippines
- 1996 - One of the 12 Outstanding Filipino Personalities in Literary (Field of Arts) - Gawad Quezon - Q.C. Gov't.
- 1996 - Global Recognition Award for Exemplary Contributions to the Upliftment of Philippine Performing Arts - CityNet, Ch. 27
- 1996 - Parangal ng Bayan Award (Film) - Office of the President
- 1996 - Par Excellence Award - Philippine Association of Teachers of Culture & Arts
- 1996 - Super Achiever Award - Eye to Eye, GMA-7
- 1996 - Newsmaker of the Year - PMPC Star Awards for Movies
- 1996 - Super Achiever Award - Eye to Eye, GMA 7
- 1996 - Showbiz Lingo Darling Award - Showbiz Lingo, 4th Anniversary, ABS-CBN
- 1995 - Plaque of Appreciation - Graphic Arts Services, Inc. (GASI)
- 1995 - Plaque of Appreciation - international recognition at the Cairo Film Festival, GMA Supershow
- 1995 - Best Stage Actress for her works in Minsa'y Isang Gamu-Gamo and DH - PUP Teatro Batangas
- 1995 - Araw ng Maynila Award (Sining sa Pagganap) - City Gov't. of Manila
- 1995 - Plaque of Recognition (Int'l. Achievement As An Actress) - Communications Arts Department - Philippine Women's University (PWU)
- 1995 - Grand Achievement Award - Parangal ng Bayan - Office of the President
- 1995 - Gold Record Award (Kahit Konting Awa the Album) - Viva Records
- 1993 - Queen of Pinoy Showbiz - Hot Stars Daily Specials
- 1993 - Jacksonville Award- Outstanding Contribution in the Dev. of Fil. Culture - Filipino-American Community of Florida, USA
- 1992 - Super Sikat Drama Actress - Diyaryo Filipino
- 1992 - Lifesize Statue, Tribute to Nora Aunor - Grand Alliance for Nora Aunor Philippines
- 1992 - Queen Of Pinoy Showbiz - Hot Stars Daily Specials
- 1992 - Super Movie Queen - Mass Media Publications
- 1992 - Star of The Night - Star Awards for TV (PMPC)
- 1992 - Plaque of Recognition - Acts & Deeds w/ Virtues of a True Apostolate of the Twin Hearts of Jesus - Twin Hearts Center for Peace
- 1991 - Best Performer - Joel David Awards for Excellence in Phil. Cinema
- 1991 - Gold Record Award (Langit Pala ang Umibig the Album) - Aguilar Music Corp.
- 1991 - Gold Record Award (Handog ni Guy LIVE, the Album) - Universal Records
- 1991 - Queen of Pinoy Showbiz - Hot Star Daily Special
- 1990 - Hall of Fame, Young Achiever Award, Parangal ng Bayan - Office of the President
- 1989 - One of the Seven Outstanding Actresses - Movie Flash
- 1989 - One of the Seven Outstanding TV Shows, Superstar - Movie Flash
- 1988 - Young Achiever Award - Golden Scroll - National Youth & Young Professional Council
- 1986 - Mother Actress of the Year - Regal Films
- 1985 - Newsmaker of the Year - PMPC Star Award for Movies
- 1985 - All time Favorite Award - Most Popular Stars '85 - Extra Hot Magazine, Jingle Songhits
- 1985 - Special Award, Tribute to the Superstar - Big Ike's Happening
- 1983 - Bicol Heritage Award - Outstanding Daughter of Iriga - Government of Iriga City
- 1983 - One of The 10 Outstanding Women in the Nation's Service (Field of Arts) - TOWNS
- 1981 - Most Popular Love Team (Guy and Pip)
- 1981 - Paborito ng Press - PMPC
- 1980 - Real Queen of Philippine Movies - BAMCI Promotions
- 1980 - Number One (One-on-one for No.1) - Kislap Magazine
- 1980 - Paborito ng Press - PMPC
- 1977 - Guy, A Symbol of Love - PMPC
- 1975 - Trophy of Appreciation (for the fundraising campaign MAMERA KAY NORA) - National Center for Mental Health
- 1975 - Most Popular Actress - PMPC
- 1975 - Most Outstanding Movie Star and Producer - Big Ike's Happening
- 1975 - Most Popular Star - Eddie Ilagan
- 1974 - Queen of Northern Luzon for 100 Hit Records
- 1973 - Miss RP Movies
- 1973 - Bb. Pilipinas ng Pelikulang At Awiting Pilipino
- 1973 - Most Popular Star of the Year - PMPC
- 1973 - Most Charitable Young Actress - Sixteen MOD
- 1972 - Plaque of Appreciation (for helping in the fundraising campaign for the restoration of the Bamboo Organ) - City of Las Pinas
- 1972 - Most Popular Actress
- 1972 - Queen of Stars (Sino ang Sikat?) - Movie Life
- 1971 - Plaque of Appreciation - Jose P. Laurel Memorial Foundation Inc., Tanauan, Batangas
- 1971 - Certificate of Appreciation - Mabini Memorial University, Iriga, Camarines Sur
- 1971 - Popularity Contest - Associated Broadcasting Corporation
- 1971 - Most Popular Star of 1970-71 - Atlas Publications
- 1971 - 2nd Place, Most Popular Love Team: Nora-Tirso - Liwayway Publications
- 1971 - 3rd Place, Most Popular Love Team: Nora-Manny - Liwayway Publications
- 1971 - 5th Place, Most Popular Love Team: Nora-Novo - Liwayway Publications
- 1971 - Trophy of Appreciation, 2nd Anniversary of Guy and Pip - Liwayway Publications
- 1971 - Queen of Stars - Mix Publications
- 1971 - KBS Lucky Star Dial Soap - Mondragon
- 1971 - Box Office Queen - Spotlight Promotions
- 1971 - One of the Top Ten Best Dressed Females - Spotlight Promotions Stars
- 1970 - Singer for the Months of February, March, and April - DWOW Radio
- 1970 - Best Female Singer in English - Philippine Academy of Recording Arts and Sciences
- 1970 - 3rd Place, Sino Ang Sikat? - Mix Publications
- 1970 - Miss Philippine Movies '70s - People's Choice Awards
- 1969 - Favorite Singer of Northern Luzon - Eagle Broadcasting Corporation, Dagupan City
- 1969 - Miss Showbusiness (Radio, TV and Stage) - Danny Holmes Publications
- 1969 - Most Promising Star of Tomorrow - Pablo S. Gomez Publications
- 1969 - Lakambini ng Sampaguita - Sampaguita Pictures
- 1969 - 6th Place (Top Radio & TV Female) - Top Magazine Personality
- 1968 - 8th Place, Miss Showbusiness
- 1967 - GRAND CHAMPION, TAWAG NG TANGHALAN
- 1966 - Certificate of Honor, First Prize Darigold Jamboree, Naga City
- 1965 - Winner (14 weeks) Darigold Bulilit Contest
- 1964 - Certificate of Honor, First Prize Liberty Big Show, Camarines Sur

== Notes ==
^I Shared with Sharon Cuneta for Crying Ladies.
^II Shared with Sharon Cuneta for Dapat ka Bang Mahalin.
^III Shared with Sharon Cuneta for Madrasta.
^IV Shared with Helen Gamboa for Bagong Bayani.
^V Shared with Vilma Santos for Pahiram ng Isang Umaga.
^VI Shared with Gina Alajar for Brutal.
^VII Shared with Aga Muhlach for Hindi Kita Malilimutan.
^VIII Shared with Aga Muhlach for Joey Boy Munti.
^IX Shared with Valerie Garcia for Lauriana and Alice Dixson for When the Love Is Gone.
^X Shared with Angelica Panganiban for That Thing Called Tadhana.
^XI Shared with Helen Gamboa for Walang Hanggan.
^XII Shared with Vilma Santos for Vilma.

== See also ==
- List of people who won the Philippine showbiz grand slam
- Nora Aunor filmography
