= Tirso Cruz III =

Filipino actor and singer (born 1952)

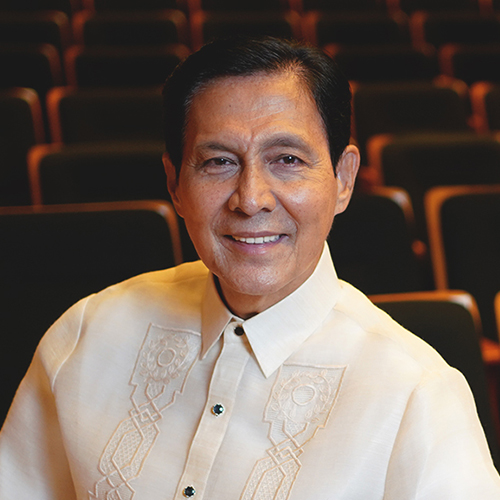
- Cruz in 2023

Chairperson of the Film Development Council of the Philippines
- In office July 5, 2022 – March 1, 2024
- President: Bongbong Marcos
- Preceded by: Liza Diño
- Succeeded by: Jose Javier Reyes

Personal details
- Born: Tirso Silvano Cruz III; April 1, 1952 (age 74) Sampaloc, Manila, Philippines
- Spouse: Erlinda Ynchausti (m. 1981)
- Children: 3
- Parent(s): Tirso Bailey Cruz Jr. (father); Elma Acosta Silvano (mother)
- Relatives: Sheryl Cruz (niece); Donna Cruz (niece); Sunshine Cruz (niece); Geneva Cruz (niece); Rayver Cruz (nephew); Rodjun Cruz (nephew); Ricky Belmonte (cousin); Bel Cruz Jr. (cousin); Woody Cruz (brother)
- Occupation: Actor, comedian, singer, politician

Tirso Silvano Cruz III (Tagalog pronunciation: [ˈkɾus]; born April 1, 1952) is a Filipino actor, comedian, and singer. He was the Chairperson of the Film Development Council of the Philippines, but resigned after one year and seven months for personal reasons. Regarded as a "matinee idol", Cruz is a FAMAS Award and Gawad Urian Award recipient.

== Early life ==
Tirso Silvano Cruz III was born at 2:46 AM on April 1, 1952, at University of Santo Tomas Hospital in Sampaloc, Manila to Tirso Bailey Cruz Jr. and Elma Acosta Silvano. He is the grandson by paternal line of musician Tirso Muñoz Cruz Sr. and María Loreto Lagrosa Bailey, and by maternal line of Tomas Silvano and Petra Acosta. Loreto's father, Lewis Edwin Bailey, was an American soldier, from Stowe, Vermont, and was the son of French Canadian immigrants.

== Politics ==
In 1986, Cruz campaigned for the reelection of president Ferdinand Marcos in the 1986 snap election.

He ran for vice-mayor of Las Piñas in 2001, but lost.

On July 5, 2022, he was appointed by President Bongbong Marcos as the chairperson of the Film Development Council of the Philippines replacing Liza Diño.

Cruz III has resigned as FDCP chairperson effective March 1, 2024 citing personal reasons. Rica Arevalo is the appointed OIC and head-project development officer for Film Education Division and Film Festivals Division.

== Personal life ==
Cruz married Erlinda "Lynn" Erillo Ynchausti (born 1959) in 1981. The couple have two sons and one daughter, TJ (October 22, 1981 – November 21, 2018), Bodie (born 1983) and Djanin (born 1988). Bodie Cruz was a housemate in Pinoy Big Brother: Season 2. On November 21, 2018, his eldest son TJ died of cancer, at the age of 37.

Cruz was raised a Roman Catholic, but converted to Evangelical Christianity in 2009.

== Discography ==
- Tirso Cruz III
- By Special Request
- PIP
- Pip at the Top
- Hawaiian Souvenirs
- TCIII
- Afterglow
- Rock and Roll Music
- Butterfly
- The Sound of Pip
- Pip Dimension

== Filmography ==
=== Film ===
Year	Title	Role
1952	Ang Pagsilang ng Mesiyas	Baby Jesus
1969	D'Musical Teenage Idols!	
1969	The Mad Generation	
1970	For You, Mama	
1971	My Heart Belongs to Daddy	
1971	Guy and Pip	Pip
1972	Nora, Mahal Kita	Pepito
1972	And God Smiled at Me	Carding
1976	Magandang Gabi sa Inyong Lahat	Roy Valdez
1977	Roma-Amor	Mario
1978	Last Target	Pip
1978	Mahal Mo, Mahal Ko	Pipo
1985	Till We Meet Again	Cholo
1985	Mga Kwento ni Lola Basyang	Roland
1986	I Can't Stop Loving You	Reynand / Kiko Dela Cruz
1988	Sana Mahalin Mo Ako	Ramon
1989	Bilangin ang Bituin sa Langit	Anselmo / Jun
1989	Greatest Performance	Briccio Ledesma
1990	Tingga ng Katarungan	
1990	Hanggang Kailan Ka Papatay	
1991	Madonna, Babaeng Ahas	Roberto
1991	Ganti ng Api	Bartolome
1992	Alyas Boy Kano	Marco
1992	Lt. Nicho-las Aguirre: Batas Ko ang Iiral	Federico Salvador Jr.
1992	Lucio Margallo	Sgt. Goyena
1992	Kailangan Kita	Atty. Gomez
1992	Kahit Buhay Ko	Melgar
1992	Amang Capulong - Anak ng Tondo II	
1993	Gascon... Bala ang Katapat Mo	
1993	Kapatid Ko si Hudas	Alvarez
1993	Beloy Montemayor Jr.: Tirador ng Cebu	Lt. Gerry Delgado
1993	Lumohod Ka sa Lupa	
1993	Isa Lang ang Buhay Mo! Sgt. Bobby Aguilar	
1993	Deo Dador: Berdugo Ng Munti	Waway
1993	Inay	Teddy
1994	Lagalag: The Eddie Fernandez Story	Roy Panganiban
1994	Epimaco Velasco, NBI	Mr. Cul
1994	Maestro Toribio: Sentensyador	
1994	Hindi Pa Tapos ang Labada, Darling	Ariel Rivero
1995	Rollerboys	Moy
1995	Harvest Home	Peping
1995	Saan Ako Nagkamali	
1995	Kahit Harangan ng Bala	Amador Almonte
1996	Anak, Pagsubok Lamang	Warden
1996	Sana Naman	Zandro
1996	Isa, Dalawa, Takbo!	Totoy
1996	Pag-ibig Ko Sayo'y Totoo	Manny Diaz
1996	Hangga't May Hininga	Congressman Ramirez
1996	Ang TV Movie: The Adarna Adventure	Diego
1997	Sino si Inday Lucing?	
1997	Ibulong Mo sa Diyos 2	
1997	Daniel Eskultor: Hindi Umaatras sa Laban	Bengson
1997	Laban Ko Ito, Walang Dapat Madamay	
1998	Hiling	Oscar
1999	Abel Villarama: Armado	Romano
2000	The Debut	Roland Mercado
2001	Bahay ni Lola	Jimmy
2002	Diskarte	Colonel Montero
2002	Singsing ni Lola	Peping
2002	Dekada '70	Evelyn's father
2002	Mano Po	Daniel Go
2003	Nympha	Father Domingo
2003	Chavit	Biboy Crisostomo
2004	Minsan Pa	Jeremiah Toledo Jr.
2005	Can This Be Love	Roger
2006	Pacquiao: The Movie	Rosalio
2006	Ang Pamana: The Inheritance	Mr. Reyes
2006	Mano Po 5: Gua Ai Di	Williamson Co
2007	Happy Hearts	Nick Ricafrente
2007	M.O.N.A.Y.	
2007	Desperadas	Patrick's father
2008	Magkaibigan	Noni
2009	When I Met U	Kardo
2009	In My Life	Benito Salvacion
2010	Miss You like Crazy	Ramon Recto
2010	The Red Shoes	Domingo
2010	Sigwa	
2011	Subject: I Love You	Frankie
2011	Bisperas	
2011	No Other Woman	Fernando Zalderiaga
2012	D' Kilabots Pogi Brothers Weh?!	Donald Trang
2012	Sisterakas	Simon Hermosa
2013	Alfredo S. Lim (The Untold Story)	Zosing
2013	Bekikang: Ang Nanay Kong Beki	Gorio
2014	Bride for Rent	Roderico "Rod" Espiritu Sr.
2015	Etiquette for Mistresses	Ambrosio "Ambet" Villoria
2015	Ex with Benefits	Jimmy
2015	Honor Thy Father	Tony
2015	The Last Pinoy Action King	Himself
2016	Always Be My Maybe	Jake's father
2016	Diyos-Diyosan	
2017	Northern Lights: A Journey to Love	Ricardo
2018	Jack Em Popoy: The Puliscredibles	P/COL. Arturo Punongbayan
2018	Rainbow's Sunset	Emmanuel "Emman" Estrella
2019	Unforgettable	Lola Olive's doctor
2019	Miracle in Cell No. 7	Secretary P/Lt. Gen. Manuel Yulo
2019	3pol Trobol: Huli Ka Balbon!	Gen. Damian Calupitan
2021	The Fabulous Filipino Brothers	
2022	An Inconvenient Love	Wilfredo Siena
2023	Keys to the Heart	Roldan Labayen
2023	When I Met You in Tokyo	Edwin
2024	Uninvited	Colonel Red Zaldarriaga

=== Television ===
Year	Title	Role
1970	Catch Up With Tirso	himself
1987–1988	Pubhouse	
1989-1990	Regal Shocker: Pugot na Maestro	Unknown
1990–1993	Palibhasa Lalake	Elmer, Momoy
1991–1992	Bistiks	Alvin
1992–1997	The Maricel Drama Special	Various Roles
1992–1995; 1995–1997	Valiente	Theo Braganza
1993	Star Drama Theater Presents: Lorna: Si Thea at si Thea	Elis
1993–1996	Lumayo Ka Man	
1994	Star Drama Theater Presents: Carmina: Salarin	Unknown
1997	Star Drama Theater Presents: Rica: Pilat	Unknown
1997–1999	Del Tierro	Rigor Del Tierro
1998–1999	Halik sa Apoy	Benjamin Rosales
2001–2003	Sana ay Ikaw na Nga	Juancho Fulgencio
2003–2004	It Might Be You	Ernest Lord Trinidad
2005	Ikaw ang Lahat sa Akin	Roden Ynares
2005	Magpakailanman	Various
2005	Daisy Siete	Various
2006	Etheria: Ang Ikalimang Kaharian ng Encantadia	Barkus
2006	Encantadia: Pag-ibig Hanggang Wakas	Barkus
2006	I Luv NY	Edward Young
2007	Lupin	Fundador "Duroy" de Dios
2007	Zaido: Pulis Pangkalawakan	Ramiro, Kuuma Le-ar (voice)
2008	Sine Novela: Kaputol ng Isang Awit	Arsenio Rivera
2008	Obra	Guest Role
2009	Sine Novela: Paano Ba ang Mangarap?	Don Mateo Valderama
2009	Komiks Presents: Mars Ravelo's Nasaan Ka Maruja?	Joselito L. Ocampo Jr.
2009	Only You	Theodore "Teddy" Javier Sr.
2009–2010	Ikaw Sana	Gener Montemayor
2010	Carlo J. Caparas' Panday Kids	Augusto Luna
2010	Endless Love	Robert Dizon
2010	Jillian: Namamasko Po	Chief R
2011	I Heart You, Pare!	Cesar "Sarsi" Estrella
2011	100 Days to Heaven	Rene Mosqueda
2011–2012	Budoy	Antonio "Anton" Maniego
2012	Valiente	Don Luis Regalado
2012	Lorenzo's Time	Manuel Montereal
2013	Kailangan Ko'y Ikaw	Rodrigo Manrique
2013	Huwag Ka Lang Mawawala	Don Romulos Diomedes
2013	The Ryzza Mae Show	Guest
2013	Wansapanataym: The Christmas Visitor	Big J / Mr. Jacinto
2014	Ikaw Lamang	Eduardo Hidalgo
2014	Pinoy Big Brother: All In	Guest Judge
2014	Hawak Kamay	Philip Agustin
2015	Wansapanataym: I Heart Kuryente Kid	Barry Gonzales
2015	Pangako Sa 'Yo	Gregorio "Lolo Greggy" Noble
2016; 2019-2022	FPJ's Ang Probinsyano (seasons 2; 7-9)	Judge/Sec. Arturo "Art" M. Padua
2017	A Love to Last	Antonio "Tony" Noble III
2017–2018	Wildflower	Julio Ardiente
2019	The General's Daughter	Santiago "Tiago" Guerrero
2019–2020	Starla	Robert Salazar
2022–2023	Maria Clara at Ibarra	Padre Damaso Verdolagas
2023	Royal Blood	Don Gustavo Royales
2024	Eat Bulaga Lenten Special: Para 'di Makalimot	Marvin
2024	Pamilya Sagrado	Jaime Sagrado
2025	Sins of the Father	Diego Ramirez
2026	Family Feud	Himself / Contestant
2026	Honor Thy Mother	Lucio Aragon
TBA	The Bagman	

== Awards and nominations ==
Year	Award giving body	Category	Nominated work	Results
1970	Awit Awards	Best New Male Singer	—N/a	Won
1990	FAMAS Awards	Best Actor	Bilangin ang Bituin sa Langit	Won
1990	FAP Awards	Best Actor	Bilangin ang Bituin sa Langit	Won
1990	Gawad Urian Awards	Best Actor	Bilangin ang Bituin sa Langit	Nominated
1993	FAMAS Awards	Best Supporting Actor	Kahit Buhay Ko	Nominated
1993	FAP Awards	Best Supporting Actor	Kahit Buhay Ko	Won
1993	Gawad Urian	Best Supporting Actor	Kahit Buhay Ko	Nominated
1994	FAMAS Awards	Best Supporting Actor	Lumuhod Ka Sa Lupa	Nominated
1996	FAP Awards	Best Supporting Actor	Inagaw Mo Ang Lahat Sa Akin	Nominated
1997	FAMAS Awards	Best Supporting Actor	Hangga't May Hininga	Nominated
2003	FAP Awards	Best Supporting Actor	Diskarte	Nominated
2004	FAMAS Awards	Best Supporting Actor	Chavit	Nominated
2011	FAMAS Awards	Best Actor	Sigwa	Nominated
2012	FAMAS Awards	Best Supporting Actor	No Other Woman	Nominated

Gawad Urian Awards

- 1996 Gawad Urian Best Supporting Actor - Inagaw Mo ang Lahat Sa Akin (nom.)
- 2003 Gawad Urian Best Supporting Actor - Mano Po (nom.)
- 2011 Gawad Urian Best Supporting Actor - Sigwa (nom.)
- 2012 Gawad Urian Best Actor - Bisperas (nom.)
- 2016 Gawad Urian Best Supporting Actor - Honor Thy Father (nom.)

Golden Screen Awards

- 2004 Golden Screen Award Best Supporting Actor-The Debut
- 2011 Golden Screen Award Best Performance by an Actor in a Supporting Role (Drama, Musical or Comedy)-Sigwa
- 2012 Golden Screen Award Best Performance by an Actor in a Supporting Role (Drama, Musical or Comedy)- Deadline: The Reign of Impunity (nom)
- 2013 Golden Screen Award Dekada Award

*Star Awards for Movies

- 1990 Actor of the Year-Bilangin ang bituin sa langit
- 2011 Movie Supporting Actor of the Year-Sigwa
- 2012 Movie Supporting Actor of the Year-Deadline: The Reign of Impunity (nom)
- 2016 Movie Supporting Actor of the Year-Deadline: Honor Thy Father

Metro Manila Film Festival

- 2015 Best Supporting Actor-Honor Thy Father
- 1997 PMPC Star Awards for Television Best Drama Actor - Valiente

Cinemalaya Independent Film Festival

- 2010 - Best Actor-Sigwa

TV Awards

- 2013 Outstanding Supporting Actor in a Drama Series-Budoy (nom)
- 2014 Outstanding Supporting Actor in a Drama Series-Huwag ka lang mawawala (nom)
- 1997 PMPC Star Awards for Television Best Drama Actor - Valiente
- 1973 Box Office King

=== Nominated ===
Year	Organization	Category/Nominated work	Work	Remarks
	Gawad Urian Awards	Best Actor	Bilangin Mo Ang Bituin Sa Langit	Nominated
	Gawad Urian Awards	Best Supporting Actor	Mano Po	Nominated
	Gawad Urian Awards	Best Supporting Actor	Inagaw Mo ang Lahat Sa Akin	Nominated
2008	22nd PMPC Star Awards for TV	Best Drama Actor	Kaputol ng Isang Awit	Nominated
2013	27th PMPC Star Awards for TV	Best Drama Supporting Actor	Huwag Ka Lang Mawawala	Nominated
2014	28th PMPC Star Awards for TV	Best Drama Supporting Actor	Ikaw Lamang	Nominated
2015	41st Metro Manila Film Festival	Best Supporting Actor	Honor Thy Father	Won
