= 'Merika =

1984 drama film by Gil M. Portes

- Official movie poster
- Directed by: Gil M. Portes
- Written by: Clodualdo del Mundo Jr.; Gil Quito
- Produced by: Antonio G. Dulalia
- Starring: Nora Aunor; Bembol Roco
- Cinematography: Ely Cruz
- Edited by: Edgardo "Boy" Vinarao
- Music by: Willy Cruz
- Production company: Adrian Films
- Distributed by: Tri-Films International
- Release date: September 24, 1984
- Running time: 102 minutes
- Country: Philippines
- Language: Filipino

'Merika is a 1984 Philippine drama film directed by Gil Portes from a screenplay written by Clodualdo del Mundo Jr. and Gil Quito. Starring Nora Aunor and Bembol Roco, the story follows Mila, an Overseas Filipino Worker (OFW) who works as a nurse in the state of New Jersey, United States.

== Plot ==
Milagros "Mila" Cruz (Nora Aunor), a Filipino nurse, has been living and working in New Jersey, United States, for about five years in the early 1980s. She rents an apartment with Violet (Marilyn Concepcion), also an overseas Filipino worker. Violet has previously failed the NCLEX but is seeking to take the exam again, in order to start working as a nurse in the United States.

The film opens with Mila preparing for a day at work and she appears disinterested in the news about U.S. politics playing in the background. She has a long commute to work from New Jersey to Manhattan. At the hospital where she works as a nurse, he is shown interacting with colleagues as well, including Danny (Marshall Factora), a Filipino immigrant working as a medical technologist, and an El Salvador overseas worker nurse who is frequently unwell and taking time off from the hospital because of troubles back home. Mila works a second job as well, after she gets off from the hospital, in a nursing home. There she has befriended one of the residents, Lolo Caloy (Cesar Aliparo), who is also a Filipino immigrant. Lolo Caloy is a retired musician who migrated to the United States before the Second World War.

Mila feels homesick and yearns for a connection with home. She makes calls to her friend, Corazon “Cora” Bautista, who is never shown onscreen, and it is through Cora that Mila communicates with her family. She also receives letters and birthday cards from Cora. Mila sends money to her family, but seems to have decided against staying in the U.S. long term.

Violet brings Mila to a surprise celebration of Mila's birthday in Danny's home, under the pretext of borrowing Danny's examination review materials. At the birthday party, Mila and Violet celebrate with a common friend, Henry (Boogie Abaya), who works as a data encoder. Danny's guest brings a new person, Mon Zablan (Bembol Roco), to the party. There is an attraction between Mon and Mila. The couple enjoys a weekend with Violet and Henry in midtown Manhattan, seeing sights including the Empire State Building. Mon reveals that he was living in Los Angeles, where he was working as an accountant, and has just recently moved to the East Coast. Henry offers to introduce Mon to his boss to get him a job. Mon agrees.

Mon and Mila continue seeing each other. Mon takes Mila to steak dinners with champagne, and takes her on a car ride, which car he purchased after getting a new job. In their conversation, Mon is appreciative of the comforts and upward mobility that can be afforded with migrating to the U.S. but Mila is more hesitant, feeling a disconnect with life in the U.S. and yearning for a simpler life back in the Philippines. Later, Mon gifts Mila an expensive box of chocolates and asks to get married. Mila is hesitant as she does not see a future for herself in the Philippines. Nevertheless, Mila continues with her life and work, helping Violeta get ready to take her NCLEX in a testing venue in Atlantic City, warning her to focus on the exam rather than the casino.

Henry asks Mila to be careful with Mon. Henry reveals that Mon never showed up in the interview that he arranged with his employer. Mila says that she appreciates Henry watching out for her and acknowledges Henry's attraction to her, but says they can only be friends, as she sees him only as a brother. Violeta and Henry appear to grow distant from Mila, although Mila suspects that it is because Violeta and Henry have gotten together as a couple. Mila and Mon deepen their relationship. It is implied that they spent a night together. Later, Violet informs Mila that based on Henry's investigation, it appears that Mon is an illegal immigrant to the United States and does not have a green card.

Mila confronts Mon over the information she received from Henry and Mon is not able to deny the allegations. Instead, Mon reiterates his love for Mila. Mila now doubts the true intentions of Mon, as their marriage could allow Mon to gain legal resident status in the United States, as Mila herself has a green card. Mila asks if Mon would still want to be together with her if she returns to the Philippines, but Mon would like to stay in the U.S.

Mila speaks to Lolo Caloy about her confusion. Lolo Caloy says that he was afraid to return to the Philippines and has never returned since he went to the U.S. Mila makes up her mind to return to the Philippines and phones her friend Cora, to tell her of the news, and Cora is tasked to inform Mila's family. Mila bids farewell to Caloy. Caloy asks Mila if she will report him to the authorities and Mila says she will not. However, Mila refuses his offered handshake. Mila informs other friends in the U.S. and bid farewell.

In the final scene, Mila is brought to the airport for her flight back to the Philippines by Violeta and Henry and they bid her farewell.

== Cast ==
Main cast

- Nora Aunor as Milagros "Mila" Cruz
- Bembol Roco as Mon Zablan

Supporting cast

- Cesar Aliparo as Lolo Caloy
- Marilyn Concepcion as Violet
- Boogie Abaya as Henry
- Chiquit Reyes as Luisa
- Marshall Factora as Danny
- Brenda Duque as Head Nurse
- Telly Portes as Nurse 1
- Lynn Atienza as Nurse 2
- Sol Oca as Jenny
- Tony Marino as Jerry
- Nina Dayao as Mrs. Gorgonia
- Dolores Medel as Lola Gorgonia
- Willie Paderon as Mr. Gorgonia

== Awards and recognition ==
Year	Group	Category	Nominee	Result
1985	Star Awards (Philippine Movie Press Club)	Best Actress	Nora Aunor	Won
1985	Gawad Urian Awards (Manunuri ng Pelikulang Pilipino)	Best Actress	Nora Aunor	Nominated
1985	Gawad Urian Awards (Manunuri ng Pelikulang Pilipino)	Best Picture	'Merika	Nominated
1985	Gawad Urian Awards (Manunuri ng Pelikulang Pilipino)	Best Director	Gil Portes	Nominated
1985	Gawad Urian Awards (Manunuri ng Pelikulang Pilipino)	Best Supporting Actor	Cesar Alipio	Nominated
1985	Gawad Urian Awards (Manunuri ng Pelikulang Pilipino)	Best Screenplay	Clodualdo del Mundo Jr. Gil Quito	Nominated
