= Naglalayag =

2004 film by Maryo J. de los Reyes

- Poster
- Directed by: Maryo J. de los Reyes
- Written by: Irma Dimaranan
- Screenplay by: Irma Dimaranan
- Produced by: Yolly Q. Leano (supervising producer); Gaudicio Manalo (executive producer)
- Starring: Nora Aunor; Yul Servo; Aleck Bovic
- Cinematography: Odyssey Flores
- Edited by: Jess Navarro
- Music by: Lutgardo Labad
- Distributed by: Angora Films
- Release date: June 23, 2004
- Running time: 121 minutes
- Country: Philippines
- Language: Filipino

Naglalayag (Silent Passage) is a 2004 Filipino movie written by Irma Dimaranan and directed by Maryo J. de los Reyes that tells the story of a May–December affair between a middle-aged judge and a young taxi driver.

== Synopsis ==
Dorinda (Nora Aunor), a state prosecutor turned judge on the edge of a mid-life crisis, finds herself completely alone. Her only son Dennis resides in the United States with his wife. She has been a widow for years but lonely she isn't, she'd always tell everyone. Truth is, she lives an empty life.

Some twist of fate has her meeting Noah (Yul Servo), a young taxi driver who is poles apart from her own social and economic backgrounds. They guy is in mourning after his father, also a cabbie, died in the hands of a hold-up gang.

== Cast ==
- Nora Aunor as Judge Dorinda Cortez Vda. De Roces
- Yul Servo as Noah Garcia
- Jacklyn Jose as Lorena Garcia
- Celia Rodriguez as Mrs. Roces
- Aleck Bovick as Rica
- Irma Adlawan as Charie
- Chanda Romero as Maita
- Pen Medina as Pacio Garcia
- Boy Abunda as himself

== Awards and recognitions ==
=== International awards ===
Year	Group	Category	Nominee	Result
2004	31st Festival International du Film Indépendant de Bruxelles (Belgium)	Special Jury Award	Maryo J. de los Reyes	Won
2004	31st Festival International du Film Indépendant de Bruxelles (Belgium)	Best Actress	Nora Aunor	Won
2004	31st Festival International du Film Indépendant de Bruxelles (Belgium)	Best Actor	Yul Servo	Won

=== Domestic awards ===
Year	Group	Category	Nominee	Result
2004	Manila Film Festival	Best Picture		Won
2004	Manila Film Festival	Best Actress	Nora Aunor	Won
2004	Manila Film Festival	Best Actor	Yul Servo	Won
2004	Manila Film Festival	Best Supporting Actress	Aleck Bovic	Won
2004	Manila Film Festival	Best Director	Maryo J. de los Reyes	Won
2004	Manila Film Festival	Best Screenplay	Irma Dimaranan	Won
2004	Manila Film Festival	Best Story	Irma Dimaranan	Won
2004	Manila Film Festival	Best Musical Score	Lutgardo Labad	Won
2004	Manila Film Festival	Best Original Theme Song	Sa Gitna ng Buhay ~ Rey Valera	Won
2005	FAMAS Filipino Academy of Movie Arts and Sciences Awards	Best Picture		Won
2005	FAMAS Filipino Academy of Movie Arts and Sciences Awards	Best Director	Maryo J. de los Reyes	Won
2005	FAMAS Filipino Academy of Movie Arts and Sciences Awards	Best Supporting Actress	Aleck Bovic	Won
2005	FAMAS Filipino Academy of Movie Arts and Sciences Awards	Best Story	Irma Dimaranan	Won
2005	FAMAS Filipino Academy of Movie Arts and Sciences Awards	Best Original Theme Song	Sa Gitna ng Buhay ~ Rey Valera	Won
2005	FAMAS Filipino Academy of Movie Arts and Sciences Awards	Best in Editing	Jess Navarro	Won
2005	FAMAS Filipino Academy of Movie Arts and Sciences Awards	Best in Cinematography	Odyssey Flores	Won
2005	FAMAS Filipino Academy of Movie Arts and Sciences Awards	Best Actor	Yul Servo	Nominated
2005	Gawad Urian Awards (Manunuri ng Pelikulang Pilipino)	Best Actress	Nora Aunor	Nominated
2005	Gawad Urian Awards (Manunuri ng Pelikulang Pilipino)	Best Supporting Actress	Aleck Bovick	Nominated
2005	Gawad Urian Awards (Manunuri ng Pelikulang Pilipino)	Best Actor	Yul Servo	Nominated
2005	Film Academy of the Philippines (Luna Awards)	Best Supporting Actress	Jaclyn Jose	Won
2005	Film Academy of the Philippines (Luna Awards)	Best Picture		Nominated
2005	Film Academy of the Philippines (Luna Awards)	Best Actress	Nora Aunor	Nominated
2005	Film Academy of the Philippines (Luna Awards)	Best Actor	Yul Servo	Nominated
2005	Film Academy of the Philippines (Luna Awards)	Best Screenplay	Irma Dimaranan	Nominated
2005	Film Academy of the Philippines (Luna Awards)	Best Sound	Nestor Mutia; Angie Reyes	Nominated
2005	Film Academy of the Philippines (Luna Awards)	Best Musical Score	Lutgardo Labad	Nominated
2005	Golden Screen Awards for Movies (EnPress)	Best Actress	Nora Aunor	Nominated
2005	Golden Screen Awards for Movies (EnPress)	Best Supporting Actress	Jacklyn Jose	Nominated
2005	Gawad PASADO (Pampelikulang Samahan ng mga Dalubguro)	Pinakapasadong Aktres	Nora Aunor	Won
2005	BALATCA (Batangas Laguna Teachers Association for Culture and the Arts	Best Actress	Nora Aunor	Won
2005	Gawad TANGLAW	Kapuripuring Aktres	Nora Aunor	Won
