= Sidhi (film) =

- Official Movie Poster
- Directed by: Joel Lamangan
- Screenplay by: Ricardo Lee
- Story by: Rolando Tinio
- Based on: Ang Kwento ni Ah by Rolando Tinio
- Produced by: Jesse M. Ejercito; Wilson Tieng
- Starring: Nora Aunor; Albert Martinez; Glydel Mercado
- Cinematography: Romulo Araojo
- Edited by: Jess Navarro
- Music by: Nonong Buencamino
- Production company: Crown Seven Ventures
- Distributed by: Solar Films
- Release date: 24 February 1999
- Country: Philippines
- Language: Filipino

Sidhi is a 1999 Filipino drama film directed by Joel Lamangan. The film stars Nora Aunor, Glydel Mercado and Albert Martinez. It was based on Rolando Tinio's Palanca-winning teleplay, Ang Kwento ni Ah, which was expanded into a movie script by Ricardo Lee.

The film won for Mercado all the Best Supporting Actress Awards given by the four annual award-giving bodies in the Philippines that time. The film also gave a posthumous award to Rolando Tinio for Best story at the FAMAS Awards.

== Synopsis ==
Ana is a sharecropper who falls for Michael unfortunately Michael is after Ana and her money Michael brings home his new lover and are castaways in an isolated village Ana becomes a submissive wife only to be betrayed and hurt in the end Michael gets killed as he tries to kill Ana and Mayang unfortunately Ana survives after Mayangs childbirth ends in tragedy leaving her with nothing but a new beginning in life Eventually, Ana kills Michael and takes care of the Mayang's son. Ana then drops the orphaned child in an orphanage. Shortly after, Ana married a single young handsome man and have children of her own and they live a simple life in her farm in a beautiful ranch house.

== Cast ==
- Nora Aunor as Ah/Anna
- Albert Martinez as Michael
- Glydel Mercado as Mayang
- Caridad Sanchez as Tia Manuella
- Samantha Lopez as Dolores
- Ray Ventura as Badong
- Angie Ferro as Ina
- Tony Masbesa as Fr. Morales

== Awards ==
| Year | Group | Category | Nominee | Result |
|---|---|---|---|---|
| 2000 | Filipino Academy of Movie Arts and Sciences Awards (FAMAS) | Best Actor | Albert Martinez | Won |
| 2000 | Filipino Academy of Movie Arts and Sciences Awards (FAMAS) | Best Supporting Actress | Glydel Mercado | Won |
| 2000 | Filipino Academy of Movie Arts and Sciences Awards (FAMAS) | Best Editing | Jess Navarro | Won |
| 2000 | Filipino Academy of Movie Arts and Sciences Awards (FAMAS) | Best Story | Rolando Tinio | Won |
| 2000 | Filipino Academy of Movie Arts and Sciences Awards (FAMAS) | Best Production Design | Tatus Aldana | Won |
| 2000 | Filipino Academy of Movie Arts and Sciences Awards (FAMAS) | Best Director | Joel Lamangan | Nominated |
| 2000 | Filipino Academy of Movie Arts and Sciences Awards (FAMAS) | Best Picture | Sidhi | Nominated |
| 2000 | Gawad Urian Awards (Manunuri ng Pelikulang Pilipino) | Best Supporting Actress | Glydel Mercado | Won |
| 2000 | Gawad Urian Awards (Manunuri ng Pelikulang Pilipino) | Best Actress | Nora Aunor | Nominated |
| 2000 | Gawad Urian Awards (Manunuri ng Pelikulang Pilipino) | Best Supporting Actress | Caridad Sanchez | Nominated |
| 2000 | Film Academy of the Philippines (Luna Awards) | Best Supporting Actress | Glydel Mercado | Won |
| 2000 | Film Academy of the Philippines (Luna Awards) | Best Cinematography | Roulo Araojo | Won |
| 2000 | Film Academy of the Philippines (Luna Awards) | Best Editing | Jess Navarro | Won |
| 2000 | Star Awards for Movies (Philippine Movie Press Club) | Best Supporting Actress | Glydel Mercado | Won |
| 2000 | Star Awards for Movies (Philippine Movie Press Club) | Movie of the Year | Sidhi | Nominated |
| 2000 | Star Awards for Movies (Philippine Movie Press Club) | Best Actress | Nora Aunor | Nominated |
| 2000 | Star Awards for Movies (Philippine Movie Press Club) | Best Actor | Albert Martinez | Nominated |
| 2000 | Star Awards for Movies (Philippine Movie Press Club) | Best Director | Joel Lamangan | Nominated |
| 2000 | Star Awards for Movies (Philippine Movie Press Club) | Best Cinematographer | Romulo Araojo | Nominated |
| 2000 | Star Awards for Movies (Philippine Movie Press Club) | Best Editing | Jess Navarro | Nominated |
| 2000 | Star Awards for Movies (Philippine Movie Press Club) | Best Screenplay | Ricky Lee | Nominated |
| 2000 | Star Awards for Movies (Philippine Movie Press Club) | Best Production Design | Tatus Aldana | Nominated |

== List of film festivals competed or exhibited ==
- 1999 – Chicago International Film Festival, Feature Film,
- 1999 – Cinemanila International Film Festival
- 2000 – 2nd New York Filipino Film Festival Lincoln
