= And God Smiled at Me =

1972 film by Mar S. Torres

- Promotional movie poster
- Directed by: Danny Holmsen; Mar S. Torres
- Produced by: Vera- Perez Family
- Starring: Nora Aunor; Tirso Cruz III; Luis Gonzales; Lucita Soriano
- Cinematography: Felipe Santiago
- Music by: Danny Holmsen
- Distributed by: Sampaguita Pictures; VP Pictures
- Release date: October 14, 1972
- Country: The Philippines
- Language: Filipino

And God Smiled at Me is a 1972 family drama film produced by Sampaguita Pictures and VP pictures. It is the official entry to the 3rd Quezon City Film Festival. The movie gave Aunor her first best actress award and marks her as a dramatic actress. The movie was also the top grosser of the film festival for that particular year.

== Cast ==
- Nora Aunor ... Celina
- Tirso Cruz III ... Carding
- Luis Gonzales ... Damian
- Lucita Soriano ... Olga
- Naty Santiago ... Celina's Mother
- Nenita Jana ... Carding's Mother / Laundry Woman

== Awards and recognition ==
Year	Group	Category	Nominee	Result
1972	3rd Quezon City Film Festival	Manuel L. Quezon Award for Best Picture		Won
1972	3rd Quezon City Film Festival	Best Actress	Nora Aunor	Won
1972	3rd Quezon City Film Festival	Best Actor	Tirso Cruz III	Won
1972	3rd Quezon City Film Festival	Best Supporting Actress	Lucita Soriano	Won
1972	3rd Quezon City Film Festival	Best Cinematography	Felipe Santiago	Won
1972	3rd Quezon City Film Festival	Best Sound	Flaviano Villareal	Won
1972	3rd Quezon City Film Festival	Best Musical Score	Danny Holmsen	Won
