= Bilangin ang Bituin sa Langit =

1989 drama film by Elwood Perez

- Official theatrical poster
- Directed by: Elwood Perez
- Screenplay by: Jake Cocadiz; Jigs Recto
- Story by: Jake Cocadiz
- Produced by: Lily Monteverde
- Starring: Nora Aunor; Tirso Cruz III
- Cinematography: Ricardo Jacinto
- Edited by: George Jarlego
- Music by: Lutgardo Labad
- Production company: Regal Films
- Distributed by: Regal Films
- Release date: August 17, 1989
- Running time: 127 minutes
- Country: Philippines
- Language: Filipino

Bilangin ang Bituin sa Langit (English: Count the Stars in the Sky) is a 1989 Philippine drama film directed by Elwood Perez from a story and screenplay written by Jake Cocadiz, with additional writing inputs by Jigs Recto. The film stars Nora Aunor and Tirso Cruz III, and it chronicles the turbulent life-long relationship between Noli (Aunor), a poor and hard-working barrio lass, and Anselmo (Cruz), her childhood sweetheart.

Produced and distributed by Regal Films, under the helm of founder-producer Lily Monteverde, Bilangin ang Bituin sa Langit won both the FAMAS Award for Best Picture and the FAP Award for Best Picture. Nora won Best Actress for this film in Urian, FAMAS, and FAP, while Tirso won Best Actor in PMPC Star, FAMAS, and FAP.

== Plot ==
In the 1960s in Laguna, Magnolia ("Noli") dela Cruz (Nora Aunor) and Anselmo Santos Jr. (Tirso Cruz III) are classmates in high school and are vying to be valedictorian in their high school graduation. Anselmo is from a rich family and is shown being tutored, fed nutritious food while studying, and getting enough rest. Noli belongs to a poor farming family, and her siblings are shown begrudging her as she is able to just study while they work in the fields, and she studies while doing other chores and late into the night by candlelight. Later, Anselmo is shown graduating valedictorian.

Damian, Noli's father, visits Doña Martina Santos seeking a loan to finance Noli's university studies in Manila. Martina is dismissive of Noli's ambitions and suggests that she become a seamstress instead. Nevertheless after Damian agrees to execute a real estate mortgage over his farm to secure the loan, Martina agrees to grant the loan. Noli sees Anselmo and accuses him of graduating valedictorian due to his mother Martina bribing the school. Noli angers Doña Martina as she suggests that her father not push through with the loan, saying she will delay her studies. Her father is insistent however and says he will work to pay back the loan to cleanse the title of the mortgage.

Noli and Anselmo enter the same university. Noli studies hard and impresses her professors. She also works part-time jobs, washing clothes and waiting on tables. She runs into Anselmo who teases her about her having to take on work to support herself, although Anselmo himself receives mediocre grades. Later, Noli receives word that her father is ill. She returns home and finds Doña Martina convincing Damian to turn over the title to their properties in exchange for PHP500.00, saying that he will no longer be able to pay the debt since he is ill. Noli convinces her father not to sell the properties. Damian dies and Anselmo offers his condolences and offers abuloy, which Noli refuses.

Noli stops her schooling to work the fields. Doña Martina has the irrigation in Noli's fields shut down because she owns the irrigation system. Doña Martina likewise has traders offer Noli low prices when she tries to sell her harvest. However, Noli meets Señor Arturo Zulueta (Miguel Rodriguez) who buys her harvest for a fair price, and later falls in love with her. On the other hand, Doña Martina becomes insolvent due to gambling losses and starts selling her properties or obtaining loans secured by mortgages on her properties, to pay for Anselmo's schooling.

Noli proves to be a skilled businesswoman. She is gifted a pair of cattle by Arturo and she is able to raise a herd from them. She develops her properties and purchases jewelry being sold by Doña Martina to finance Anselmo's continued medical studies abroad. She wears them in her high school reunion where she is honored and she donates funds for the construction of a new building. Anselmo is likewise honored as he is the first medical school graduate but he is jealous of Noli's success. He enters a relationship with Margot, Arturo's sister, even if he appears to be infatuated with Noli. Arturo and Noli become a couple. One night however, Noli and Anselmo make love and Noli finds out that she is pregnant.

Noli speaks to Anselmo and suggests marriage, without informing him of her pregnancy. Anselmo is dismissive but informs Doña Martina of the proposal. Doña Martina opposes this, even as she is informed by her lawyer that such marriage would allow Doña Martina to prevent the foreclosure of her properties securing loans that she owes Noli. Eventually, Noli marries Arturo. Margot is disgusted with Noli's social status and insults Arturo as a cuckold. Noli is unable to deny the accusation. This drives Arturo to a blinding rage and eventually he takes Noli's child and rides on his horse. He is met with a fatal accident, but the child survives.

Later, Noli is shown having built an ancestral home, in an effort to belong to the illustrados. She realizes her vengefulness however and attempts to release some of the properties of Doña Martina back, as the latter is ill, bankrupt, and near death. Doña Martina realizes her mistakes and seeks forgiveness from Noli, and dies. Noli arranges for the funeral and burial of Doña Martina. She welcomes Anselmo to the wake but is surprised when Anselmo arrives with a woman who is his wife and a child. Anselmo rebuffs Noli's kindness, saying he is happy and that Noli should stop patronizing him. He sees Noli's daughter but is not aware that he is the father. When leaving, he slings mud on Noli using his car, while Noli attempts to chase after him.

Time moves forward 20 years and it is the 1980s. Maggie Zulueta (also played by Nora Aunor), Noli's daughter, is a fun-loving young woman, unlike her hardworking mother, and is at odds with her mother. Noli is the owner of a business empire and is surprised to find Anselmo Santos (Jun) Jr. (also played by Tirso Cruz III) as a new employee. Noli exerts pressure on Jun as an employee and berates him for mistakes. Anselmo finds out about this and meets with Noli, asking her to lay off his son. Noli threatens to have her dogs attack him if he does not leave her house. Later, Maggie meets Jun and they fall in love. When Maggie introduces Jun to Noli as her boyfriend, Noli prohibits Maggie from ever seeing Jun, and reveals that Jun and Maggie are half-siblings, as they share a common father, Anselmo. Jun leaves together with Maggie.

Noli visits Anselmo's home and pleads for his help to drive Maggie and Jun apart. Noli also confesses that she had also loved Anselmo but Anselmo believes that Noli has only ever loved money. Noli informs him that Maggie is their daughter and Anselmo is shocked. Maggie and Jun are shown together, unwilling to part ways but given the impossibility of them continuing their incestuous relationship, they decide to take their own lives by driving their car off a cliff. Anselmo and Noli mourn the death of their respective children and accept each other's love, finally marrying each other in their old age.

== Cast ==
Main cast

- Nora Aunor as Doña Magnolia "Noli" Dela Cruz vda. de Zulueta and Maggie Zulueta
- Tirso Cruz III as Dr. Anselmo Santos and Anselmo Santos Jr.

Supporting cast

- Gloria Romero as Doña Martina Santos
- Miguel Rodriguez as Señor Arturo Zulueta
- Ana Margarita Gonzales as Margot Zulueta
- Perla Bautista as Cedes Dela Cruz, Noli's mother
- Mario Escudero as Damian Dela Cruz, Noli's father
- Vangie Labalan as Matilde
- Beverly Salviejo as Connie
- Rolando Tinio as the principal
- Manjo del Mundo as Noli's Brother

== Production ==
The production of Bilangin ang Bituin sa Langit lasted nearly three years, with Regal Films announcing its completion on August 12, 1989.

== Release ==
Bilangin ang Bituin sa Langit was released in the Philippines on August 17, 1989.

=== Television broadcast ===
The film received a terrestrial television premiere on July 29, 1991, as a feature presentation for Regal Presents, ABS-CBN's Monday night block dedicated to films from the Regal film studio.

== Critical response ==
Mario A. Hernando of Malaya Newspaper said that the film was "the quintessential" and "a loving tribute to the 'Golden Age of Philippine Cinema'" while Melissa G. Contreras of Manila Chronicle said that Aunor is a "prime mover in the movie" due to the emotions she showed in her character.

== Awards and recognition ==
Year	Group	Category	Nominee	Result
1990	FAMAS Awards	Best Picture		Won
1990	FAMAS Awards	Best Director	Elwood Perez	Won
1990	FAMAS Awards	Best Actress	Nora Aunor	Won
1990	FAMAS Awards	Best Actor	Tirso Cruz III	Won
1990	FAMAS Awards	Best Supporting Actress	Gloria Romero	Nominated
1990	Gawad Urian Awards (Manunuri ng Pelikulang Pilipino)	Best Actress	Nora Aunor	Won
1990	Gawad Urian Awards (Manunuri ng Pelikulang Pilipino)	Best Music	Lutgardo Labad	Won
1990	Gawad Urian Awards (Manunuri ng Pelikulang Pilipino)	Best Production Design	Raymond Bajarias; Ray Maliuanag; Gerry Pascual; Freddie Valencia	Won
1990	Gawad Urian Awards (Manunuri ng Pelikulang Pilipino)	Best Actor	Tirso Cruz III	Nominated
1990	Gawad Urian Awards (Manunuri ng Pelikulang Pilipino)	Best Director	Elwood Perez	Nominated
1990	Gawad Urian Awards (Manunuri ng Pelikulang Pilipino)	Best Picture		Nominated
1990	Gawad Urian Awards (Manunuri ng Pelikulang Pilipino)	Best in Cinematography	Ricardo Jacinto	Nominated
1990	Gawad Urian Awards (Manunuri ng Pelikulang Pilipino)	Best Editing	George Jarlego	Nominated
1990	Gawad Urian Awards (Manunuri ng Pelikulang Pilipino)	Best Screenplay	Jake Cocadiz	Nominated
1990	Gawad Urian Awards (Manunuri ng Pelikulang Pilipino)	Best Sound	Joe Climaco	Nominated
1990	Film Academy of the Philippines Awards	Best Picture		Won
1990	Film Academy of the Philippines Awards	Best Actress	Nora Aunor	Won
1990	Film Academy of the Philippines Awards	Best Actor	Tirso Cruz III	Won
1990	Film Academy of the Philippines Awards	Best Director	Elwood Perez	Won
1990	Film Academy of the Philippines Awards	Best Original Screenplay	Jake Cocadiz; Jigs Recto	Won
1990	Film Academy of the Philippines Awards	Best Production Design	Raymond Bajarias; Ray Maliuanag; Gerry Pascual; Freddie Valencia	Won
1990	Star Awards for Movies (Philippine Movie Press Club)	Best Actor	Tirso Cruz III	Won
1990	Star Awards for Movies (Philippine Movie Press Club)	Production Designer of the Year	Ray Maliuanag	Won
1990	Star Awards for Movies (Philippine Movie Press Club)	Best Actress	Nora Aunor	Nominated
1990	Catholic Mass Media Awards	Best Actress	Nora Aunor	Nominated

== TV adaptation ==
In 2020, GMA Network remade the film into a TV series. It stars Nora Aunor who is also part of the original film as Cedes, Mylene Dizon as Magnolia "Nolie" and Kyline Alcantara as Margarita "Maggie".
