= Ang Kwento Ni Mabuti =

- Official Poster
- Directed by: Mes de Guzman
- Written by: Mes de Guzman
- Starring: Nora Aunor; Sue Prado; Mara Lopez; Arnold Reyes
- Cinematography: Albert Banzon
- Edited by: Abbas Tabas
- Production companies: Cinelarga Productions; PLDT-Smart Foundation; Sampaybakod Productions; Studio 5; Unitel Entertainment
- Distributed by: Cinelarga Productions
- Release dates: September 18, 2013 (CineFilipino Film Festival); September 25, 2013 (Wide release)
- Country: Philippines
- Languages: Ilocano; Filipino; English (subtitle)
- Box office: ₱440,236.00

Ang Kwento Ni Mabuti (lit. 'The Story of Good') is a 2013 Filipino drama film and the official entry to the first CineFilipino Film Festival.

The film was the first collaboration of the award-winning actress Nora Aunor and the award-winning director Mes de Guzman. The film was shot entirely in Aritao, Nueva Vizcaya. The dialogue of the film is entirely in Ilocano, to give the film its authenticity with English subtitles.

The film was also top-grosser of the first CineFilipino Film Festival.

The film was based on a Filipino literary drama story about Mabuti, a woman who is the embodiment of the quality her name was based on.

== Cast ==
- Nora Aunor as Mabuti de la Cruz
- Sue Prado as Nelia
- Mara Lopez as Lucia de la Cruz
- Arnold Reyes as Ompong de la Cruz.
- Ama Quiambao
- Josephina Estabillo as Guyang

== List of Festival Competed or Exhibited ==
- 1st CineFilipino film Festival, Manila, Philippines
- The 20th Festival International des Cinémas d'Asie | Festival du Film Asiatique de Vesoul "Cinemas d'Asie" (11-18 Feb 2014), France
- 6Th Cinema Rehiyon, Cagayan de Oro, Philippines (February 18–22, 2014)s

== Awards and recognition ==
1st Cine-Filipino Film Festival
Year	Category	Nominee	Result
2013	Best Picture		Won
2013	Best Director	Mes de Guzman	Won
2013	Best Screenplay	Mes de Guzman	Won

Young Critics Circle
Year	Category	Nominee	Result
2013	Best film	Mes de Guzman	Nominated
2013	Best Performer	Nora Aunor	Nominated
2013	Best Screenplay	Mes de Guzman	Nominated
2013	Best in Cinematography and Visual Design	Albert Banzon (cinematography), Cesar Hernando and Mes de Guzman (production design)	Nominated

15th Gawad Pasado
Year	Category	Nominee	Result
2014	Pinakapasadong Pelikula		Won
2014	Pinakapasadong Aktres	Nora Aunor	Won
2014	Pinakapasadong Istorya	Mes de Guzman	Won
2014	Pinakapasadong Sinematograpiya	Albert Banson	Won

37th Gawad Urian
Year	Category	Nominee	Result
2014	Best Picture		Nominated
2014	Best Director	Mes de Guzman	Nominated
2014	Best Actress	Nora Aunor	Nominated
2014	Best Sound		Nominated
