= 2nd Awit Awards =

1970 Philippine music awards ceremony

- Date: July 16, 1970

Highlights
- Most awards: George Canseco (3)
- Best Album: Norma, Norma by Norma Ledesma
- Song of the Year: "True Love Came Too Late" by George Canseco
- Best Single: "My Pledge of Love" by Edgar Mortiz

Television/radio coverage
- Network: DWOW; DZTM; DZTR (radio)

The 2nd Awit Awards were held on July 16, 1970. They honored achievements in the Philippine music industry for the year 1969. This was the first time the Philippine Academy of Recording Arts and Sciences (PARAS) presented these awards after the Awit Awards Executive Committee was dissolved.

Twenty-five awards were given that night. The foreign division was scrapped after last year's ceremony. George Canseco had the most awards with three.

== Winners ==
=== General ===
Song of the Year	Best Single	Best Album
"True Love Came Too Late" – George Canseco	"My Pledge of Love" – Edgar Mortiz	Norma, Norma – Norma Ledesma

=== People ===
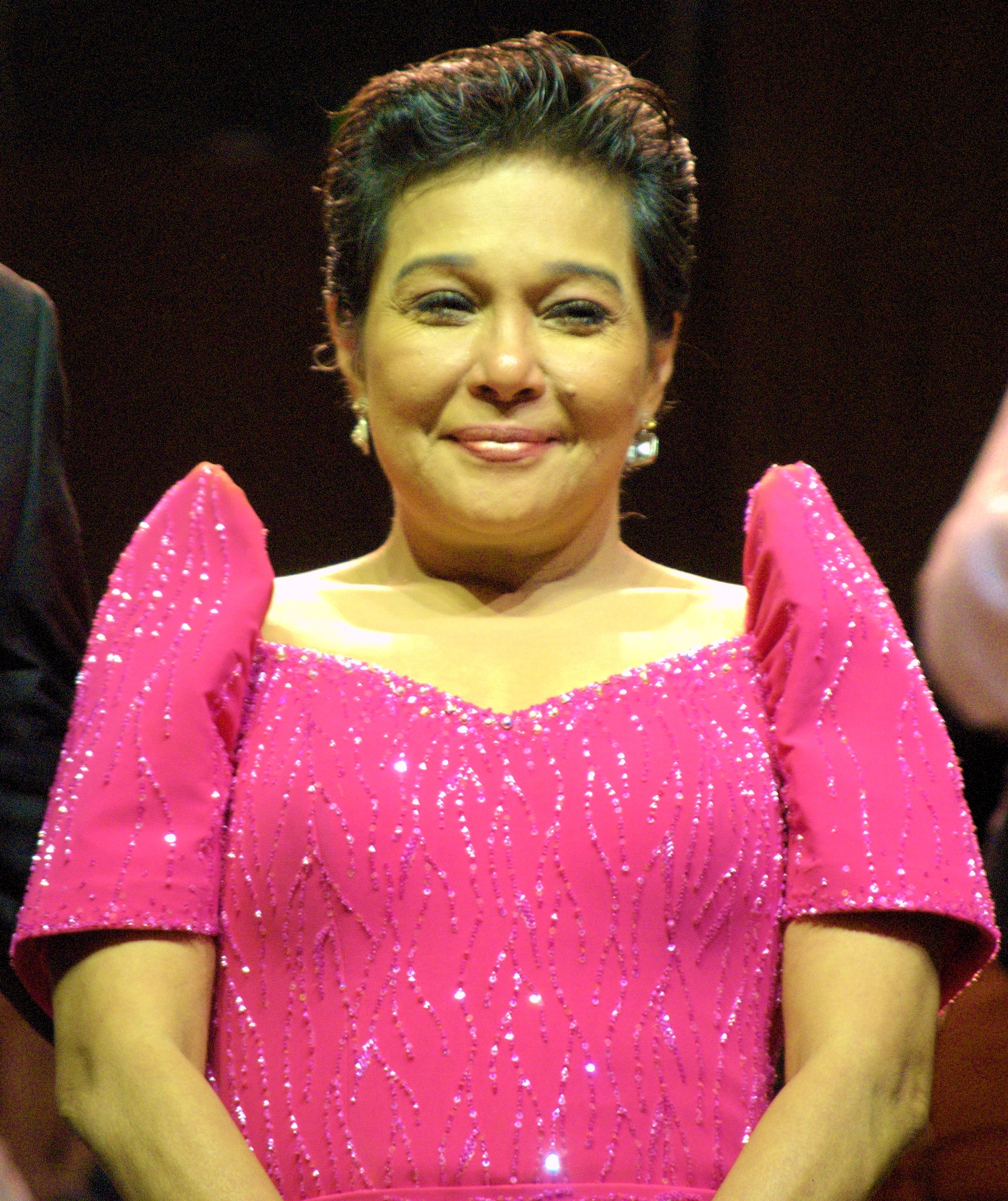
Nora Aunor, Best Female Singer (English) winner

Best Female Singer (English)	Best Male Singer (English)
Nora Aunor	Eddie Peregrina
Best Female Singer (Vernacular)	Best Male Singer (Vernacular)
Yolanda Guevarra	Danilo Santos
Best New Female Singer	Best New Male Singer
Esperanza Fabon	Tirso Cruz III
Best Vocal Group (English)	Best Vocal Group (Vernacular)
The Lumberjacks	Cora Rosales & Ben Zubiri Duet

=== Instrumental ===
Best Instrumentalist	Best Instrumental Group
Relly Coloma	The Moonstrucks

=== Composing, lyric writing and arranging ===
Best Composer	Best Lyricist	Best Musical Arranger
George Canseco	George Canseco	Doming Valdez

=== Production ===
Best Recording Engineer	Best Record Producer	Best Recording Studio
Jess Felix; Ric Santos	Manuel P. Villar	Cinema-Audio

=== Packaging and notes ===
Best Album Cover	Best Album Liner Notes
Norma, Norma	Love Mood – Danny Yson

=== Special awards ===
Best Special Recording	Posthumous Award	Special Award of Merit
Pandacan Original Brass Band^{[A]}	Ben Zubiri	DWOW

Notes:

^[A]It is currently unknown which song of the Pandacan Original Brass Band won the "Best Special Recording".
