= Susan Fuentes =

Filipino Visayan-language singer (1954-2013)

Background information
- Also known as: Queen of Visayan Songs
- Born: Susan Toyogon; 1 November 1954; Butuan, Agusan, Philippines
- Died: 7 September 2013 (aged 58) Quezon City, Philippines
- Genres: Visayan music • Soul • Manila Sound • OPM
- Occupation: Singer • recording artist
- Instrument: Vocals
- Years active: 1975–1982 • 2010–2013
- Labels: Alpha Records; Jem Recording

Susan Toyogon (1 November 1954 – 7 September 2013), known professionally as Susan Fuentes (Tagalog pronunciation: [su.zən fwɛntɛs]); was a Filipino singer and recording artist known as the "Queen of Visayan Songs". She became the most recognized and influential performer of Visayan-language music in the Philippines during the 1970s and 1980s. Her emotional singing style and powerful voice helped popularize many Cebuano and other Visayan classics across the country.

Her fame went beyond the Visayas region because she successfully brought Visayan music into the mainstream Filipino music industry. She released several gold-selling albums and gained audiences in the Visayas, Mindanao, and even among Tagalog-speaking listeners. Record labels and fans eventually promoted her with the title Queen of Visayan Songs, which became her lasting identity in Philippine music history.

== Early years ==
Susan Fuentes was born Susan Toyogon in Butuan, Agusan del Norte in 1954. She was the fourth of five siblings. Her father was from Bohol while her mother was from Surigao.

She grew up in a music-loving household. At age five, Fuentes was already joining amateur singing contests in Butuan. While still in high school at Agusan National High School, she was featured in the Bisaya Magazine for her singing talent and beauty.

As a singer, Fuentes’ sultry performance was noted for its lusty vocals and emotional styling. She was also known for her Latin-styled Visayan folk songs.

== Career ==
In 1970, after graduating in high school, Susan went to Manila with her mother to continue her singing career.

In Manila, she sang at Victoria Peak, a famous club in Quezon City during that period. Her stint at the club was also her audition. In an interview, she recounted that her mother was hospitalized across the street while she was performing at the club.

With the help of a friend, Eugenia Molina, she gained access to signing up with Alpha Records in 1973. At Alpha Records, she had been renamed Susan Fuentes, a name derived from that era’s silver-screen archrivals Susan Roces and Amalia Fuentes. She was able to record two English-adapted records.

Susan was later signed to Jem Recording with her recording of the album Ang Atong Pinangga in 1976 where she was given the moniker Queen of Visayan Songs, and eventually released ten albums, all certified gold records in the Visayas and Mindanao.

She gained crossover success in the Tagalog, Ilocano, Hiligaynon (or Ilonggo) and Visayan music market with the famed Awitnong Bahandi and Mga Awiting Walang Kupas.

Susan's first television appearance was on the RPN-9 program Superstar, where she performed “I Believe in Love,” originally recorded by Barbra Streisand.

In 1978, Susan re-recorded the Christmas song “Miss Kita Kung Christmas,” composed by Hermie Uy and Fe Ayala. The song which was later released into a single, became one of Susan's biggest hits notable for its use of the colloquial Manila Sound style, combining English and Filipino lyrics, which contributed to its popularity among younger listeners and established it as a well-known Filipino pop Christmas song. The song was previously recorded by The Lightnings. Over the years, “Miss Kita Kung Christmas” has been covered by several Filipino artists, including Rico Puno, Sharon Cuneta, Donna Cruz, and Sarah Geronimo.

She eventually took a long hiatus from the music industry to raise her own children. By the 1990s, she had largely withdrawn from the entertainment scene.

After over coming her personal struggles she returned to the industry in 2010 with the help of her long-time friend and singer Dulce. She performed with Pilita Corrales in Cebu, with Dulce in Bohol and made a guest appearance at Walang Tulugan with the Master Showman on June 19. These would be her last performances on stage. Her worsening health condition prompted Fuentes to be confined in the hospital.

On August 19, 2012, Dulce organized a fundraising event for her titled "Usahay: A Moment for Susan" which took place on August 28 at Zirkoh Morato in Quezon City. Among the performers were Manilyn Reynes, The CompanY, Gary Granada, Nonoy Zuñiga, Aiza Seguerra, Jose Mari Chan, Marco Sison, Jett Pangan, Isay Alvarez, and Frencheska Farr. The event was organized to help Fuentes pay for her medical bills.

In December 2012, she was recognized by the JRG Halad Foundation as one of that year's awardees for outstanding contributions to Cebuano music. On March 23, 2013, she was featured in GMA Network's life story series Magpakailanman. Host Mel Tiangco interviewed her alongside her friend Dulce. It was her last televised appearance.

== Personal life ==
She has been living in Quezon City since 1973. Fuentes described her life during the 80's as "self-destructive" despite being wealthy.

She was in a relationship with a man named Darl who was already married and had children of his own. During the affair, they had two children; a daughter and a son. The couple lived together briefly and did not marry. After Fuentes became a drug addict, her partner decided to return to his other family and took her children with him. She became estranged from them for many years until 2012.

During her hiatus, Fuentes went through personal struggles with her life as she battled drug addiction and heavy smoking that would eventually lead to her partner taking her children away from her.

In 2002, she underwent kidney transplant after they were both damaged. She had to be confined in the Kidney Institute for three weeks, where she had 13 sessions of dialysis.

== Death ==
During her final years, Fuentes had to be confined in the hospital due to her worsening health condition. She stopped performing on stage after 2010. In August 2012, she was interviewed by GMA News where she expressed hope of being able to live for another ten years. At her final televised appearance on Magpakailanman in March 2013, she told Mel Tiangco of how much she wanted to live so that she could see her children again and get to know them better following years of estrangement.

Fuentes died on September 7, 2013, after prolong confinement at the National Kidney and Transplant Institute. It was revealed that she had been in battle with colon cancer.

== Awards and accolades ==
On December 2, 2012, Susan Fuentes received the Jose R. Gullas Halad Award for Outstanding Contribution to Cebuano Music presented by the JRG Halad Foundation in the program entitled Gratis Et Amore held at the Radisson Blu Hotel in Cebu City.

The JRG Halad Foundation also hosted a tribute for Fuentes and the late Cebuano Maestro Mil Villareal, who also died in the same month, on September 30, 2013 at the Halad Museum in Cebu City.

Cora Almerino of Freeman Cebu Lifestyle spoke of Susan Fuentes as a “hermeneutic diva” whose performances of Bisdak folk songs invite deeper cultural and intellectual interpretation rather than mere nostalgic enjoyment. She posed that Fuentes’ singing preserves and expresses Cebuano identity, social values, humor, gender dynamics, and class consciousness through layered meanings embedded in the lyrics and melodies of traditional songs. While acknowledging the influence of Western culture on contemporary musical tastes, Fuentes’ songs are continuing cultural texts that enable listeners to reflect on and reconnect with Bisdak sensibilities and collective experience.

Organizations	Year	Category	Work	Result	Ref.
JRG Halad Foundation	2012	Jose R. Gullas Halad Awardee - Outstanding Contribution to Cebuano Music	Herself	Won	

== Discography ==
=== Albums ===
Studio Albums
Title	Tracklisting	Notes	Ref.
Ang Atong Pinangga (1976)	1. Aninipot; 2. Padayon; 3. Aye'g Tohi!; 4. Hagki Ako; 5. Gi-Unsa Mo; 6. Pinangga, Akong Pinangga; 7. Hinigugma Ko; 8. Nasayod Ko; 9. Ayaw Ko'g Hagki; 10. Langitnong Himaya; 11. My World Is Getting Smaller Everyday		
A New Feeling (Visayan Song Book) (1977)	1. Di Kapugngan; 2. Kon Daw May Kasuro; 3. Ahon Maako Ka; 4. Di Ko Buot; 5. Kon Duna Nay Pagmahal; 6. Ang Akong Tindahan; 7. Pilyong Alibangbang; 8. Larawan Sa Kagahapon; 9. Hala-Hala Boogie; 10. Itug-An Ko Na Lang; 11. Wa Gayod; 12. Duha		
Awitnong Bahandi (1977)	1. Sa Kabukiran; 2. Pasayloa Ug Hikalimti; 3. Gikan Pa Ako Sa Bukid; 4. Awit Sa Inahan; 5. Medley: Rosas Pangdan • Pobreng Alindahaw • Krutsay • Kamingsaw Sa Payag • Matud Nila; 6. Kanhi Ako Pinangga; 7. Ako Sinakit Sa Palad; 8. Hain Nang Saad; 9. Handurawan; 10. Nahisulat Sa Hangin; 11. Patay'ng Buhi		
Halad Nako (Awitnong Bahandi Part 2) (1978)	1. Mga Kinaham Ni Lolo; 2. Dahong Laya; 3. Siloy; 4. Balud; 5. Ayaw Hilabti Ang Bulak; 6. Manamilit Na; 7. Kampopot Sagol-Sagol; 8. Lusay; 9. Kon Dunay Kasakit; 10. Nahikatulog Na; 11. Ikaw; 12. Ay Kapait		
Mga Awiting Walang Kupas (1980)	1. Bakas Ng Lumipas • Ang Tangi Kong Pag-Ibig • Sa Piling Mo; 2. Lambingan • Minsan Lamang • Hindi Kita Malimot; 3. Nasaan Ka Irog • Ikaw Rin; 4. Arimunding-Munding • Ang Pipit • Sinisinta Kita • Ikaw Ang Mahal Ko; 5. Irog, Ako Ay Mahalin • Walang Kamatayan • Sapagkat Kami ay Tao Lamang; 6. Halina’t Magsaya • Kung Nagsasayaw Kita • Tugtuging Bukid • Sa Libis Ng Nayon; 7. Hinahanap Kita • Bulung-bulungan • Babalik Ka Rin; 8. Tunay Na Tunay • Panaligan Mo Sinta • Minamahal - Sinasamba		
Tango Uban Kang Susan (1980)	1. Nag Tango Ta (La Cumparsita); 2. Niadtong Takna (Adios Muchachos); 3. Di Na Ko (Jealousy); 4. Banhawa Na (Noche Azul); 5. Pagkadugay Na (Tango Of Roses); 6. Tagoon Ko Na Lang (Jurame); 7. Kon Daw Ikaw (Roman Guitar); 8. Pagkatam-is (Last Cup); 9. Dali Ngari (Kiss Of Fire); 10. Magkuyog Ta (Valentino Tango); 11. Dad-A Ako (Hernando's Hideaway); 12. Lawas Ko'g Kalag (A Media Luz)		
Straight from the Heart (1982)	1. Endless Love; 2. Diana Ross Medley; 3. Smoke Gets In Your Eyes; 4. Home; 5. Feelings; 6. Slow Hand; 7. And This Is My Beloved; 8. It's My Turn; 9. Higher and Higher; 10. Out Here On My Own; 11. Theme From "A Star Is Born"		
Miss Kita Kung Christmas (1990)	1. Miss Kita Kung Christmas; 2. Pasko Na Sinta Ko; 3. Narito Na Ang Pasko; 4. Pag-Ibig Sa Pasko; 5. Sana Sa Pasko; 6. Tuloy Ba? (Ang Pasko); 7. Christmas Card; 8. Dalangin Sa Pasko; 9. Eh Kasi Pasko; 10. Miss Kita Kung Christmas (Instrumental)		

Collaborative Albums
Title	Tracklisting	Notes	Ref.
Mananaygon (1978)	1. Mananaygon; 2. Alas Doce; 3. Gloria En Excelsis Deo; 4. Ayaw Katingala; 5. Karon Maglipay; 6. Daygon; 7. Kami Nanag-awit; 8. Maglipay Kita; 9. Sumad Karon; 10. Maayong Pasko; 11. Maayon Gabi		
Yukbo sa Bisayanhong Awit w/ Pilita Corrales (1979)	1. Hinugpong Nga Mga Awit (with Pilita Corrales); 2. Usahay; 3. Dili Na Mausab (Pilita Corrales); 4. Ang Gugmang Gibati Ko; 5. Pagkadali (Pilita Corrales); 6. Ilongo Medley (with Pilita Corrales); 7. Gimingaw Ako; 8. Nahigwaos (Pilita Corrales); 9. Banyaga Nagkatawa; 10. Kamingaw Gayod (Pilita Corrales); 11. Kagahapon Ug Karon		

=== Singles ===
- "Miss Kita Kung Christmas" (1978)(original released by The Lightnings Band in 1976; also Covered by Apo Hiking Society, also covered by Rico J. Puno, Sharon Cuneta, Ryan Cayabyab, Donna Cruz, Jessa Zaragoza, Sarah Geronimo, and Ronnie Liang)
- "I Wonder What Will Happen" (1976)
- "While I'm Around" (1976)
- "Pinangga" (Tagalog Song) (1976)
- "Himaya" (Tagalog Song) (1976)
- "Sa Dilim Nitong Gabi" (1976)
- "Sa Damgo Ko" (w/ Harana Trio) (1976)
- "Tayo'y Magsimbang Gabi" (1976)
- "Ang Aguinaldo Ko sa 'Yo" (1976)
- "Kawang Lamang" (1976)
- "Mahinumdum Ka Ra" (adapt. "Song For Anna") (1977)
- "Mga Hayop Sa Damo" (Movie Theme) (1977)
- "Anong Pait" (Movie Theme) (1977)
- "Ginikanan" (1978)
- "Katahap" (1978)
- "Dapa't Magsaya" (with The Apo Hiking Society and Passionata) (1978)
- "Nakapagtataka" (1978; original by APO; also covered by Hajji Alejandro, Rachel Alejandro, and pinoy rock band Sponge Cola)
- "Siya" (1978)
- "Singsing Nga Brilyante" (1979)
- "Balili" (1979)
- "Ay Pagkapait" / "Bisag Unsaon" (1979)
- "Undo" (1979)
- "Ayaw Pagpaila" (1979)
- "Himayang Nahunlak" (1979)
- "Krutsay Sakayanon( )
- "Tig!" (1979)
- "Sigi Lang" (adapt. "I Will Survive") (1980)
- "Gugma Ko" (1981)
- "Pagbati" (1981)

== See also ==
- Butuan
- Agusan del Norte
- Del Horrest
- Josephine Cawit
- Lee Solidad
- Luz Loreto
- Max Surban
- Milyo Naryo
- Romie Quinones
- Rosalie Robles
- Yoyoy Villame
