= Awit Awards =

Philippine music award

- Current: 39th Awit Awards
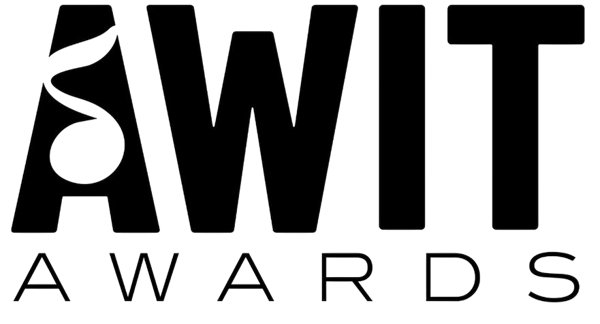
- Awarded for: Outstanding achievements in the music industry
- Country: Philippines
- Presented by: Philippine Association of the Record Industry
- First award: March 23, 1969; 57 years ago
- Website: Website

The Awit Awards are music awards in the Philippines given annually by the Philippine Association of the Record Industry (PARI) to recognize the outstanding achievements in the music industry. The word "Awit" means "song" literally in Tagalog.

The first awards were given in 1969 at a ceremony in Makati. After three awards ceremonies were held, the Awit Awards were discontinued in 1972. In 1988, PARI brought back the awards and the organization still handles these awards.

== History ==
The idea for Awit Awards was conceived by Oskar "Oskee" Salazar, the Billboard correspondent for the Philippines at that time, in late 1968. The first awards ceremony was held on March 23, 1969, that took place in Makati. It was organized by the Awit Awards Executive Committee, which composed of representatives from different record companies, with Salazar as their chairman. Winners were voted by a jury composed of 15 people which were selected by the Awit Awards Executive Committee. The jurors were chosen by their jobs in the music industry such as a record retailer, jukebox operator, entertainment/music writer or a radio station program director.

Days before the second awards, they decided to create a formal academy called the Philippine Academy of Recording Arts and Sciences (PARAS), replacing the Awit Awards Executive Committee. The academy was headed by Danny Villanueva, the outgoing president of the Filipino Academy of Movie Arts and Sciences (FAMAS), as the chairman alongside Salazar as the co-chairman. It was composed of 75 members. The second awards was held in July 1970 while the third happened in June 1971. These two ceremonies were administered by the academy. From 1972 until 1987, no Awit Awards ceremonies were held.

In 1988, the Philippine Association of the Record Industry resurrected the Awit Awards. Instead of following the previous numbering pattern, they decided to call the 1988 awards as the 1st Awit Awards. This pattern continued until now.

== Nomination process ==
36th Awit Awards trophy

Any recording company which is a member of the PARI can submit entries for Awit Awards. A non-member recording company can qualify if it has a business arrangement with a PARI member such as licensing, distributing and marketing. The entries that could be submitted are based on the eligibility period when the music was released. The eligibility period is always from January 1 to December 31 of the previous year. Nominations may only be awarded to any person with Filipino heritage, resident or non-resident of the Philippines. Foreigners must show documents certifying their Filipino heritage.

All entries would be then screened by judges. The jury comprises radio personnel, entertainment journalists, television personalities, composers, brand/marketing professionals and musicians. For the technical achievement categories, judges could either be a sound/vocal/musical engineer, television commercial producer, film director or someone from the media. The judges would vote on all entries and the five highest scoring entries would become the nominees for each category. A category could have more than 5 nominees if there's a tie.

Nominees in each category would go through another voting round with the highest scoring finalists would be then declare as the winners in the awards night.

Currently, the ballots are audited by the Isla Lipana & Co., a Philippine member firm of the PricewaterhouseCoopers.

== Ceremonies ==
Presented by the Awit Awards Executive Committee and the Philippine Academy of Recording Arts and Sciences

Event	Date	Albums of the Year	Singles of the Year	Host	Venue
1st	March 23, 1969	English: Her Kind of Music – Norma Ledesma	"Ting-A-Ling" – Pauline Sevilla	—	—
1st	March 23, 1969	Vernacular: Mabuhay Singers sing Pandangguhan, Dahil sa Iyo and other Philippine Songs – Mabuhay Singers	"De Colores" – Pauline Sevilla	—	—
1st	March 23, 1969	Foreign: The Graduate – Simon and Garfunkel	"The Sound of Silence" – Simon and Garfunkel	—	—
2nd	July 16, 1970	Norma, Norma – Norma Ledesma	"My Pledge of Love" by Edgar Mortiz	—	—
3rd	June 1971	The Phenomenal Nora Aunor – Nora Aunor	"Sixteen" – Vilma Santos	—	Manila Hotel

Presented by the Philippine Association of the Record Industry

Event	Date	Album of the Year	Song of the Year (Note: "Song of the Year" is awarded to the songwriters. The song's artist, which may or may not be the song's writer, are listed here for simplicity.)	Host	Venue
1st	December 5, 1989	Moving Thoughts – Gary Valenciano	"Take Me Out of the Dark" – Gary Valenciano	—	—
2nd	1990	Constant Change – Jose Mari Chan	Not awarded		
3rd	June 29, 1991	Smokey Mountain – Smokey Mountain	"Kailan" – Ryan Cayabyab	Jose Mari Chan, Sharon Cuneta	Metropolitan Theater
4th	1992?	Shout For Joy – Gary Valenciano	"Everlasting Love" – The Company	—	—
5th	1992?	Shout For Joy – Gary Valenciano	"Everlasting Love" – The Company	—	—
6th	June 26, 1993	Six by Six – The Company	"Anak Ng Pasig" – Geneva Cruz	—	Philippine International Convention Center
7th	June 25, 1994	Not awarded	"Babalik Ka Rin" – Gary Valenciano	—	Philippine International Convention Center
8th	June 17, 1995	Tag-Ulan, Tag-Araw – Afterimage	"Paalam Na" – Rachel Alejandro	—	University of the Philippines Theater
9th	June 14, 1996	Cutterpillow – Eraserheads	"Forevermore" – Side A	—	Meralco Theater
10th	September 19, 1997	South Border – South Border	"Kahit Kailan" – South Border	Francis Magalona	AFP Theater
11th	June 26, 1998	Sticker Happy – Eraserheads	"Sinaktan Mo Ang Puso Ko" – Michael V	Dingdong Avanzado, Geneva Cruz	University of the Philippines Theater
12th	November 23, 1999	Interactive – Gary Valenciano	"Mabuti Pa Sila" – Gary Granada	—	AFP Theater
13th	November 8, 2000	No Limits Vina Morales	"Kung Mawawala Ka" – Ogie Alcasid	Ryan Cayabyab, Kuh Ledesma, Martin Nievera	AFP Theater
14th	October 11, 2001	All Heart – Lani Misalucha	"Kailangan Ko'y Ikaw" – Ogie Alcasid	—	AFP Theater
15th	September 19, 2002	A Better Man – Ogie Alcasid	"Pagdating ng Panahon" – Aiza Seguerra	Rachel Alejandro, Franco Laurel, Roselle Nava, Randy Santiago	AFP Theater
16th	October 16, 2003	A Heart's Journey – Jose Mari Chan	"Only Selfless Love" – Jamie Rivera	—	AFP Theater
17th	September 9, 2004	Bigotilyo – Parokya ni Edgar	"Mr. Suave" – Parokya ni Edgar	Karel Marquez, Sarah Meier, KC Montero, Iya Villania	NBC Tent
18th	May 26, 2005	Episode III – South Border	"Rainbow" – South Border	KC Montero	AFP Theater
19th	June 15, 2006	Light, Peace, Love – Bamboo	"Hallelujah" – Bamboo	—	PAGCOR Grand Theater
20th	August 8, 2007	Maharot – Kamikazee	"Narda" – Kamikazee	Christian Bautista, Toni Gonzaga, Mo Twister	NBC Tent
21st	November 26, 2008	Salamat – Yeng Constantino	"Ikaw" – Sarah Geronimo	Christian Bautista, Nikki Gil	Eastwood Central Plaza
22nd	December 7, 2009	Eraserheads: The Reunion Concert – Eraserheads	"Yugto" – Rico Blanco	Eugene Domingo, Piolo Pascual	Filoil Flying V Arena
23rd	September 30, 2010	Byahe – Noel Cabangon	"Upuan" – Gloc-9	Tutti Caringal, Yeng Constantino, Karylle	SM Mall of Asia
24th	December 12, 2011	Now Playing – Juris	"Pakiusap Lang (Lasingin Nyo Ako)" – Chito Miranda	Billy Crawford, Nikki Gil	Music Museum
25th	November 27, 2012	Panaginip – Noel Cabangon	"Ako Na Lang" – Zia Quizon	Denise Laurel, Krista Kleiner, Anthony Semerad, David Semerad	Glorietta
26th	December 11, 2013	MKNM: Mga Kwento Ng Makata – Gloc-9	"Sirena" – Gloc-9	—	Sequoia Hotel
27th	December 12, 2014	Liham at Lihim – Gloc-9	"Magda" – Gloc-9	Marion Aunor, Josh Padilla	Newport Performing Arts Theater
28th	December 9, 2015	Perfectly Imperfect – Sarah Geronimo	"Ikaw" – Yeng Constantino	Christian Bautista, Yeng Constantino, Karylle	Music Museum
29th	December 7, 2016	The Great Unknown – Sarah Geronimo	"Bawat Daan" – Ebe Dancel	Tippy Dos Santos, Matteo Guidicelli	Music Museum
30th	November 26, 2017	Life Of A Champion – Quest	"Dahil Sa'yo" – Iñigo Pascual	Tippy Dos Santos, Donny Pangilinan	Kia Theater
31st	October 14, 2018	Soul Supremacy – KZ Tandingan	"TRPKNNMN" – Gloc-9 ft. Agsunta	Jay-R, DJ Lexy Angeles	New Frontier Theater
32nd	October 10, 2019	Malaya – Moira dela Torre	"Tagpuan" – Moira dela Torre	The Wishfuls, Rhea Basco, Bradz, Plethora	New Frontier Theater
33rd	August 29, 2020	CLAPCLAPCLAP! – IV of Spades	"Imposible" – KZ Tandingan ft. Shanti Dope	Sam Cruz, Paolo Sandejas	Online due to COVID-19 pandemic
34th	November 29, 2021	Daybreak – Leanne & Naara	"Paubaya" – Moira dela Torre	—	Online due to COVID-19 pandemic
35th	November 23, 2022	Pebble House Vol. 1: Kuwaderno – Ben&Ben	"Binibini" – Zack Tabudlo	Samm Alvero	Newport Performing Arts Theater
36th	November 9, 2023	Don't Blame The Wild One! – Ena Mori	"Uhaw (Tayong Lahat)" – Dilaw	Sassa Gurl	Baked Studios
37th	December 7, 2024	Daisy – Unique	"Raining in Manila” – Lola Amour	—	Music Museum
38th	November 16, 2025	The Traveller Across Dimensions – Ben&Ben	"Misteryoso" – Cup of Joe	Ana Ramsey, Elijah Canlas, Joao Constancia, Maxie Anderson, Paulo Angeles, Ryle Santiago, Queenay Mercado, Dylan Menor, Kych Minemoto	Meralco Theater
39th	September 16, 2026	Andalucia – IV of Spades	"Aura" – IV of Spades	Sam Y.G.	SM Mall of Asia Arena

== Categories ==
=== Performance Awards ===
- Best Performance by a Female Recording Artist
- Best Performance by a Male Recording Artist
- Best Performance by a Group Recording Artists
- Best Performance by a New Female Recording Artist
- Best Performance by a New Male Recording Artist
- Best Performance by a New Group Recording Artists
- Best Performance by a Child/Children Recording Artist/s
- Best Collaboration

=== Creativity Awards ===
- Album of the Year
- Song of the Year
- Best Selling Album of the Year
- Best Ballad Recording
- Best Rock/Alternative Recording
- Best World Music Recording
- Best Novelty Recording
- Best Dance Recording
- Best Inspirational/Religious Recording
- Best Christmas Recording
- Best Rap Recording
- Best Jazz Recording
- Best R&B Recording
- Best Regional Recording
- Best Song Written for Movie/TV/Stage Play

=== Technical Achievement Awards ===
- Best Musical Arrangement
- Best Vocal Arrangement
- Best Engineered Recording
- Best Album Package
- Music Video of the Year

=== Digital Awards ===
- Most Downloaded Song
- Most Downloaded Artist

=== People's Choice Awards ===
- People's Choice Favorite Female Recording Artist
- People's Choice Favorite Male Recording Artist
- People's Choice Favorite Group Recording Artists

=== Special awards ===
- Dangal ng Musikang Pilipino Award
- International Achievement Award

== See also ==
- Philippine Association of the Record Industry
