= Emilio Villareal =

Maestro Mil Villareal
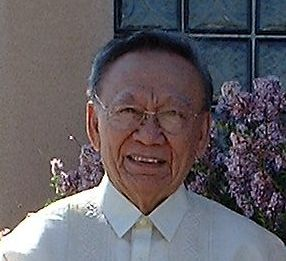
- Maestro Mil Villareal

Background information
- Born: Emilio Villareal; December 21, 1920
- Origin: Boljoon, Cebu, Philippine Islands
- Died: September 12, 2011 (aged 90)
- Occupations: Composer, Musical Director
- Instrument: Piano
- Years active: 1946–2008
- Website: http://mil.evillareal.com/

Emilio Villareal (December 21, 1920 – September 12, 2011), also called Maestro Mil, was a Filipino composer and musician. Born in Boljoon, Cebu in 1920, Mil was from a Chinese-Spanish family of musicians.

He started as the school band director of the University of San Carlos (1946–1948). He moved on to becoming a staff pianist and eventually, the musical director of Cebu Broadcasting Company (1948–1982). With the advent of television, he was picked as the musical director of Channel 7's Sali Kami (1983–1988). He was also the Band Leader of the Aristocrats Orchestra and DYRC Orchestra. During this time, his reputation for composing some of the most memorable songs in Visayan history flourished. Among the most unforgettable ones was "Bisan sa Damgo Lang", a song popularized and sung by Pilita Corrales, the Philippines' foremost female ballad singer.

Mil's nine grown children and grandchildren reside in Europe, the Philippines, the US and Canada. Mil and his wife, Enriqueta, moved to Edmonton, Alberta, Canada in 1990.

Although already retired from the Philippine musical circle, Mil continued to offer his services and musical genius to the Philippine Choral group in Edmonton where, as musical director, he mentored and provided musical assistance, even composed songs, for their annual concerts from 1991 to 2000. He also led the Visayas/Mindanao Association (VISMIN) choir in Edmonton where various activities are organized by Filipinos, most notably, the Sto. Niño fiesta. During these events, Mil composed songs for the group to sing, including "Panamilit". In his later years, Mil continued to entertain and fulfill his musical drive. In Halad 2010, he was one of the honorees. In 2011, he penned his last composition, a final legacy to the Cebuano culture and the arts, titled "Awit Ni Dodong" the theme song of Jose R. Gullas Halad Museum with lyrics written by Cebuano newscaster Leo Lastimosa.

== Musical compositions ==
- Alaut
- Angelica
- Awit ni Dodong
- Bisan Sa Damgo Lang
- Bulawan Sa Lapok
- Hain Na
- Hain Nang Saad
- Hinumdomi ... Mohilak Ka Usab
- Ikaw
- Ikaw Ang Langit Ko
- Imo Ako
- Inahan Ko
- Kahibulongan
- Kay Ikaw Akong Gipakamutya
- Langit ug Yuta
- Lawos Na
- Lusapon Beach
- May Adlaw Pa
- Nahadlok Ako
- Nahisulat Sa Hangin
- Panamilit
- Pasko Sa Kalipay
- Patrocino De Maria
- Sa Matag Pitik Ning Dughan
- San Lorenzo
- Unang Panagkita
- Usa Ka Higayon
- Veronica
- Wa'y Lain Tagiya

== Awards and achievements ==
- 1958 Most Outstanding Piano (Jazz) Player, awarded by the United States Information Service and the Clarion Magazine
- 1980 Cebu Pop Music Festival Winner with the song "Langit ug Yuta"
- 1986 Most Outstanding Visayan Song Composer, awarded by the City Government of Cebu
- 1987 Most Outstanding Musical Arranger, awarded by the City Government of Cebu
- 1995 Outstanding Contribution to the Development of Radio Broadcasting in Cebu, awarded by the World Broadcasting Corporation
- 1996 Recognition in Pioneer Radio Entertainment, awarded by the Cebu Organization of Media Entertainers
- 1998 VISMIN AWIT Presidential Award in recognition of his outstanding contribution to the cultural life of the Filipino community in Edmonton, Alberta, Canada through his music
- 2001 Fine Arts Award received during the 2001 Fifth Hiyas (Gem) Awards (established by the Karilagan Dance Society to recognize deserving Filipino-Canadians for their achievements and contributions to the Edmonton Filipino community and Alberta)
- 2010 Halad Honoree recognizing his remarkable contributions to Cebuano music as composer. His works can be viewed at the Jose R. Gullas Halad Museum founded by the Freeman Chair, Dodong Gullas, situated at the corner of V. Gullas (Manalili) St. and D. Jakosalem St.
- 2012 Garbo sa Sugbo posthumous lifetime award from the Province of Cebu (August 10, 2012)
- 2012 Mabuhi ka Sugbuanon from the Province of Cebu (July 4, 2012)
