= Ben Zubiri =

Filipino composer and entertainer (1911–1969)

- Photo taken from The Freeman, date not given
- Born: Benjamin Wenceslao Dacayana Zubiri; September 28, 1911; San Nicolas, Cebu, Philippine Islands, US
- Died: November 9, 1969 (aged 58)
- Occupations: Singer; songwriter; composer; actor; guerrilla fighter; radio director; radio and television host
- Spouse: Luz del Rosario Butalid
- Children: 5
- Writing career
- Language: Cebuano

Benjamin Wenceslao Dacayana Zubiri (September 28, 1911 – November 9, 1969) was a Filipino singer-songwriter, composer, actor, and radio and television personality from Cebu City. In the 1950s and 1960s, Zubiri hosted radio programs as Iyo Karpo. During this period, he was the best-known radio personality in the Visayas and Mindanao. A prolific songwriter, Zubiri never sold his songs, but his fellow Cebuanos consider many of them classics.

Born to a Spanish father and a Filipina mother, Ben Zubiri began his career in the 1930s, competing in singing contests on the radio. Instead of going to college, he became a composer and theater actor. In 1938, Zubiri made his film debut in Bertoldo ug Balodoy (Note: Bertoldo and Balodoy) (1938), the first talking picture in the Cebuano language. He appeared in some of the earliest Cebuano films. After World War II came to the Philippines, Zubiri served as a guerilla soldier and was stationed on Bohol, a smaller island east of Cebu. He composed his most famous song, "Matud Nila" (Note: So They Say) (1941), during the war.

After the war, Zubiri married Luz Butalid, a Boholana, with whom he started a family. He began to direct radio dramas and musical programs. His character Iyo Karpo debuted on the radio show Asa Ka Inday? (Note: Where Are You, Inday?) and hosted several programs on Cebu City's KZRC (now DYRC), including PMC Amateur Hour, (Note: Other sources call the program Purifico Amateur Hour, or Purico Amateur Hour, which might be because of a change in naming rights.) a weekly musical program, and the advice show Pangutan-a Ako. (Note: Ask Me) Iyo Karpo also starred in the television show Ang Banay ni Iyo Karpo. (Note: Iyo Karpo's Family) Zubiri died in 1969 and was survived by his wife and children.

== Biography ==
=== Early life and career (1911–1945) ===
Benjamin Wenceslao Dacayana Zubiri was born on September 28, 1911, in San Nicolas, Cebu, attended San Nicolas Elementary School, and lived in San Nicolas for most of his life. San Nicolas was one of six municipalities that merged to form Cebu City in 1937.

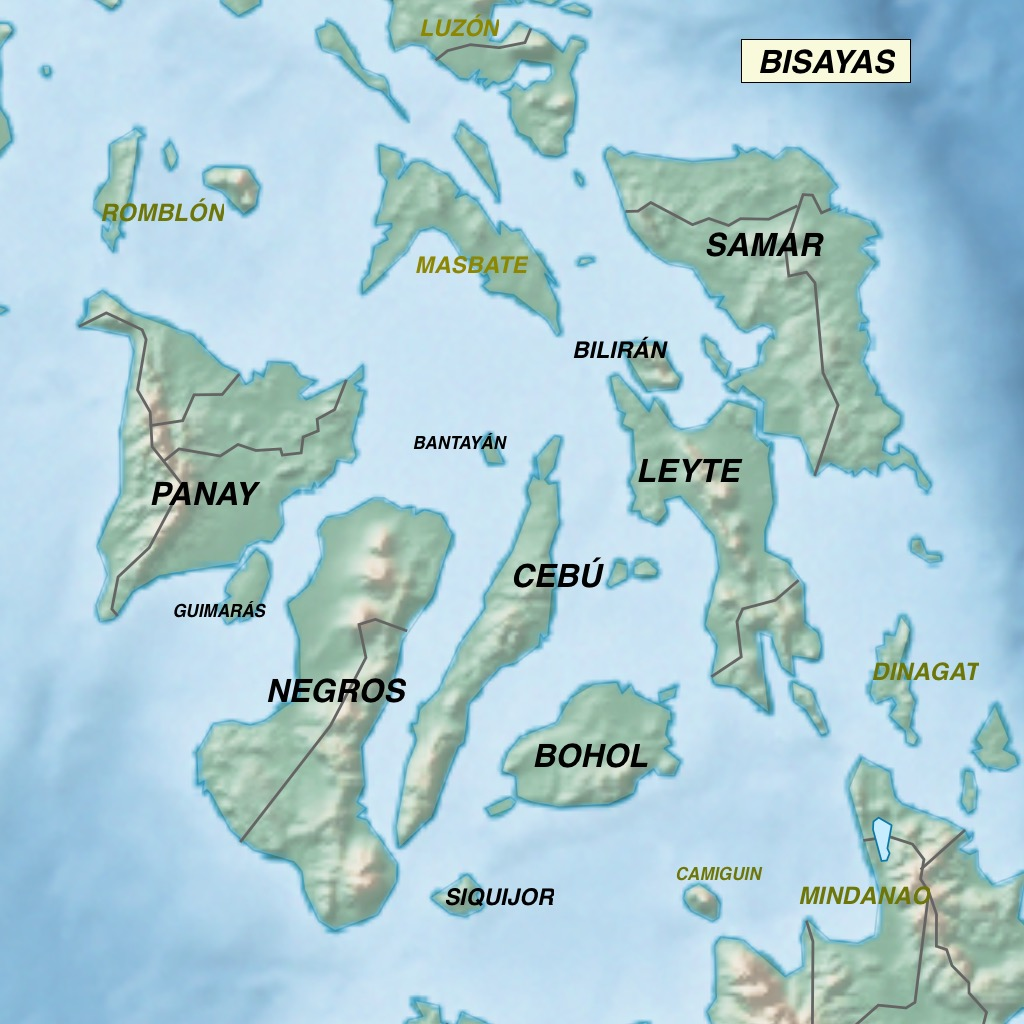
The Visayas is one of the three main island groups of the Philippines, with Luzon to the north and Mindanao to the south. Cebu and Bohol are in the Central Visayas.

Ben Zubiri's mother, Sergia Dacayana, was a Cebuana, while his father, Jesus Zubiri, was a Spaniard who hailed from Mindanao. At the time of his death, Jesus Zubiri was a resident of Iligan, Lanao Del Norte, on Mindanao. While Ben Zubiri was never formally trained in music, he harbored a love for music from childhood. His mother had taught him how to play the guitar at an early age. Later on, he competed in amateur singing contests, where he distinguished himself initially through his mestizo features and height, and then through his distinctive style of singing.

At one event, Zubiri caught the eye of Harry Fenton, the American manager of KZRC (now DYRC), Cebu City's first radio station. Fenton introduced Zubiri to show business and was an early mentor. Under Fenton, Zubiri trained as a composer. He kicked off his career competing in singing contests on KZRC in the 1930s, often featuring his original compositions, and performing in the theater troupes led by Greg Bacua and Toting Villarino. He also made his film debut with a lead role in Bertoldo ug Balodoy (1938), the first talking picture in the Cebuano language. Zubiri decided to pursue theater instead of going to college.

Before World War II, Zubiri was known for his songs "Karon Ulahi Na" (Note: Now It's Too Late) and "Ang Palad Nagbuot", (Note: Destiny Decides) which were inspired by an admirer of his. Zubiri fell in love with her, but had to leave for Manila to represent Cebu in the radio singing contest Amateur Hour and record his songs at Victor Recording Studios. When World War II broke out, Zubiri embarked on the journey home aboard the Corregidor. Although the ship sank on the way, Zubiri survived and managed to return to Cebu. Upon his arrival, he discovered that the woman had gotten married in his absence.

After the Japanese occupied the Philippines, Zubiri joined the regional guerilla resistance under Colonel James M. Cushing. He created his best known song, "Matud Nila", during this period, (Note: One source states that "Matud Nila" was instead a pre-war composition.) in 1941. "Ngano Bang Mipakita Ka" (Note: Why Did You Come) and "Pukawon Ko Ikaw" (Note: I'll Wake You Up) were also war-time compositions. Zubiri was stationed in Buenavista, Bohol, where he met a Boholana woman named Luz del Rosario Butalid and won her affections with his songs. His song "Sa Lungsod sa Buenvista", (Note: In the Town of Buenvista) which tells the story of a woman who got married before her two elder sisters, is based on her. (Note: Luz del Rosario Butalid was born on January 2, 1917, in Inabanga, Bohol, to Claudio Remolador Butalid, a district supervisor for the Bureau of Instruction, and Bibiana del Rosario. She had two older sisters, Carolina and Caridad. Notable members of the Butalid family include Governor of Bohol Rolando Gatal Butalid and, through his mother, Senator José Clarín. Luz, a retired teacher at the University of the Visayas, outlived her husband and died in May 2007.)

=== Post-war career (1945–1969) ===
After the war ended, Zubiri married Butalid and they had five children together: Elnora, Edna, Elvin, Eleanor and Edwina. He acted in more films, and briefly returned to singing on KZRC before shifting his career to directing radio shows such as the musical programs Haranista (Note: Serenader) and Gabii sa Tirana, (Note: Night of the Love Song) and Camay Theater of the Air, a radio soap opera. From 1950, Zubiri managed the radio dramas of the Philippine Manufacturing Corporation (PMC), including the morning programs Ligid sa Kapalaran, (Note: Wheel of Love) Sinugatan sa Bag-ong Adlaw, (Note: Presents of a New Day) and Mugrazu Time, and the evening program Asa Ka Inday?, (Note: Where Are You, Inday?) wherein he debuted his character of Iyo Karpo.

In 1951, Zubiri began hosting and managing PMC Amateur Hour, a long-running musical program that went on for an hour every week on KZRC. He used the pseudonym Iyo Karpo, his wisecracking, comedic alter ego. The show immediately made him a household name. In his entry in the CCP Encyclopedia of Philippine Art, the authors Hope Sabanpan-Yu and Gizelle Louis M. Dasmariñas recount that people "crowded to hear his programs which were played in the plaza because the studio was too small to hold the audience." In 1955, Iyo Karpo started hosting another program titled Pangutan-a Ako, in which he responded to inquiries from his listeners. According to his daughter, Edwina, Zubiri easily got emotional, especially over his listeners' sad stories.

According to Cebu City's The Freeman, Iyo Karpo was the best-known radio personality in the Visayas and Mindanao during the 1950s and 1960s. At the time, one journalist described the character as "the worldly-wise, earthly and garrulous old man of radio, who in an ancient, quivering and slightly graveled voice, lampoons, chides and counsels listeners". Zubiri also worked on the weekly Darigold Jamboree and the variety television show Channel 3 Presents for three years. Later on, he hosted his own television program, Ang Banay ni Iyo Karpo, (Note: Iyo Karpo's Family) on ABS; directed and starred in the 30-minute radio serials Dear Iyo Karpo and Dahon nga Natagak; (Note: Fallen Leaf) and had a lead role on DYSS's Langit ang Paghigugma. (Note: Heaven Is Love)

On July 5, 1956, Jesus Zubiri, the father of Ben Zubiri, died intestate in Spain, leaving behind two commercial lots in Iligan. The probate court appointed Ben Zubiri as administrator of his father's estate and recognized him as his only heir after notifying Jesus Zubiri's widow, Aurora Camara Vda. de Zubiri. In 1959, Camara filed litigation against Ben Zubiri claiming rights to the properties, leading to a two-decade legal battle. Zubiri died on November 9, 1969, and was survived by his wife and children, but the case remained unresolved. On May 29, 1980, the Supreme Court of the Philippines ruled in Zubiri's favor.

== Legacy ==
Although his post-war career was focused on radio, Zubiri remained a prolific songwriter. His work ranges from the sentimentality of "Matud Nila" to the humorous tone of "Inday Mahimo Ba" (Note: Inday, Is It Possible?) and "Pasayawa ko Day". (Note: Let's Dance, Day) Although Zubiri never wanted to sell his songs, his family said that he worked on them late into the night. The songs "Matud Nila", "Ikaduhang Bathala", (Note: Second God) (Note: Zubiri dedicated "Ikaduhang Bathala" to his wife.) "Katulog Na Inday", (Note: Sleep, Inday) "Ngano Bang Mipakita Ka", "Tuhoi", (Note: Believe) "Mitu-o Ako", (Note: I Believe) "Ang Gugmang Gibati Ko" (Note: The Love I Feel) and "Pasayawa ko Day" are now considered Cebuano classics.

In the mid-1970s, the Cebuana singer Pilita Corrales covered Zubiri's balitaw "Matud Nila", which is sung from the perspective of a spurned suitor, and popularized it across the Philippines. Other artists, including Nora Aunor and Sharon Cuneta, produced their own versions. It became so well-known that it was sung by First Lady Imelda Marcos and is still Zubiri's most renowned song. As a famous Cebuano composition, it has been labeled as a cultural anthem of the Cebuano people and a masterpiece of their language. In 2007, the Cebu Provincial Board conferred a lifetime achievement award upon Zubiri. The resolution's author, Victor Maambong, described "Matud Nila" as reflecting the Cebuano character of choosing their values over materialism—the only thing that the impoverished suitor can offer to his sweetheart is pure love, which, he sings, is "more precious than gold" (Note: Cebuano: ... labaw sa bulawan)—and persisting in the face of adversity.

Zubiri has received other honors after his death. He won the Posthumous Award at the 1970 Awit Awards, and a formerly unnamed street in Barangay Labangon, Cebu City, was named for him in 1981. He received the Jose R. Gullas award in 2007, and his daughters Elnora and Edwina donated his piano to the Jose R. Gullas Halad Museum ahead of its opening in 2010. In 2019, The Freeman named Zubiri one of the Top 100 Cebuano Personalities.

== Translations ==
All titles translated from Cebuano.
