= 38th Awit Awards =

2026 award ceremony for Filipino music

- Description: The Night of Pure OPM Brilliance
- Date: November 16, 2025
- Venue: Meralco Theater, Ortigas Avenue, Pasig City
- Country: Philippines
- Presented by: Philippine Association of the Record Industry (PARI)
- Eligibility: 01 January 2024 to 31 December 2024
- Hosted by: Ana Ramsey; Dylan Menor; Elijah Canlas; Joao Constancia; Kych Minemoto; Maxie Andreison; Paulo Angeles; Queenay Mercado; Ryle Santiago
- Preshow hosts: Niko Badayos; Baileys Acot; Selina Griffin; Carmela Lorzano; Adam Buck; Gab Pascual
- Website: awitawards.com

Philippine Television coverage
- Network: TV5
- Runtime: 120 minutes
- Produced by: PARI and MQuest Ventures (in partnership with Vibe)
- Directed by: Johnny Manahan

The 38th Awit Awards ceremony, presented by the Philippine Association of the Record Industry (PARI), took place on 16 November 2025 at the Meralco Theater, Ortigas Avenue, Pasig City. The show was co-produced in partnership with MQuest Ventures' music countdown platform Vibe. The annual event recognized outstanding achievements and excellence in Original Pilipino Music (OPM). The presentation, directed by veteran industry director Johnny Manahan and broadcast via TV5, integrated a digital-first approach that celebrated both legacy music icons and contemporary youth artists.

== Background ==
=== Production and Broadcast ===
The 38th iteration of the ceremony marked a notable structural shift as PARI collaborated extensively with MQuest Ventures (MQV). This partnership was intended to infuse the long-running awards institution with a modernized, youth-driven digital framework powered by the Vibe platform.The main telecast proper was formatted into a sleek 120-minute primetime broadcast block on the free-to-air network TV5. Rather than utilizing conventional standalone hosts, the main program's pacing was guided dynamically by a collective group of "Vibe Jocks," including Ana Ramsey, Dylan Menor, Elijah Canlas, Joao Constancia, Kych Minemoto, Maxie Andreison, Paulo Angeles, Queenay Mercado, and Ryle Santiago.

=== The Violet Carpet ===
The ceremony also introduced the "Violet Carpet," a re-imagined variation of the traditional arrivals red carpet intended to function as an interactive hub connecting contemporary artists with live fandoms. The pre-show carpet coverage and surrounding behind-the-scenes segments were facilitated by Vibe's designated Gen V correspondents, consisting of Niko Badayos, Baileys Acot, Selina Griffin, Carmela Lorzano, Adam Buck, and Gab Pascual.

== Nominees and winners ==
PARI announced the nominees on 3 October 2025.

Below are the nominees and winners. The winners are listed first and in bold italics.

=== Grand Awards ===
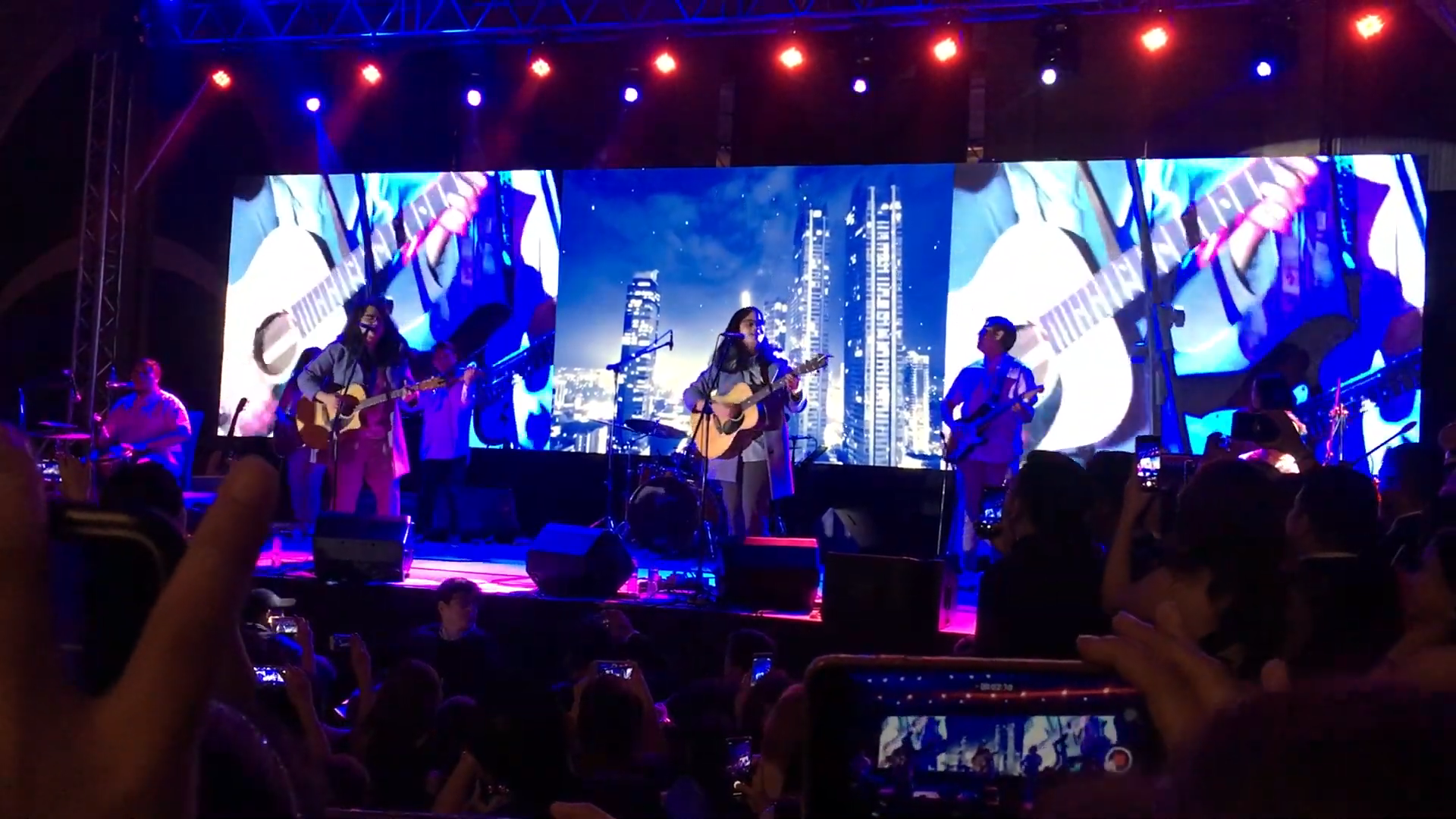
Ben&Ben wins Album of the Year at 38th Awit Awards

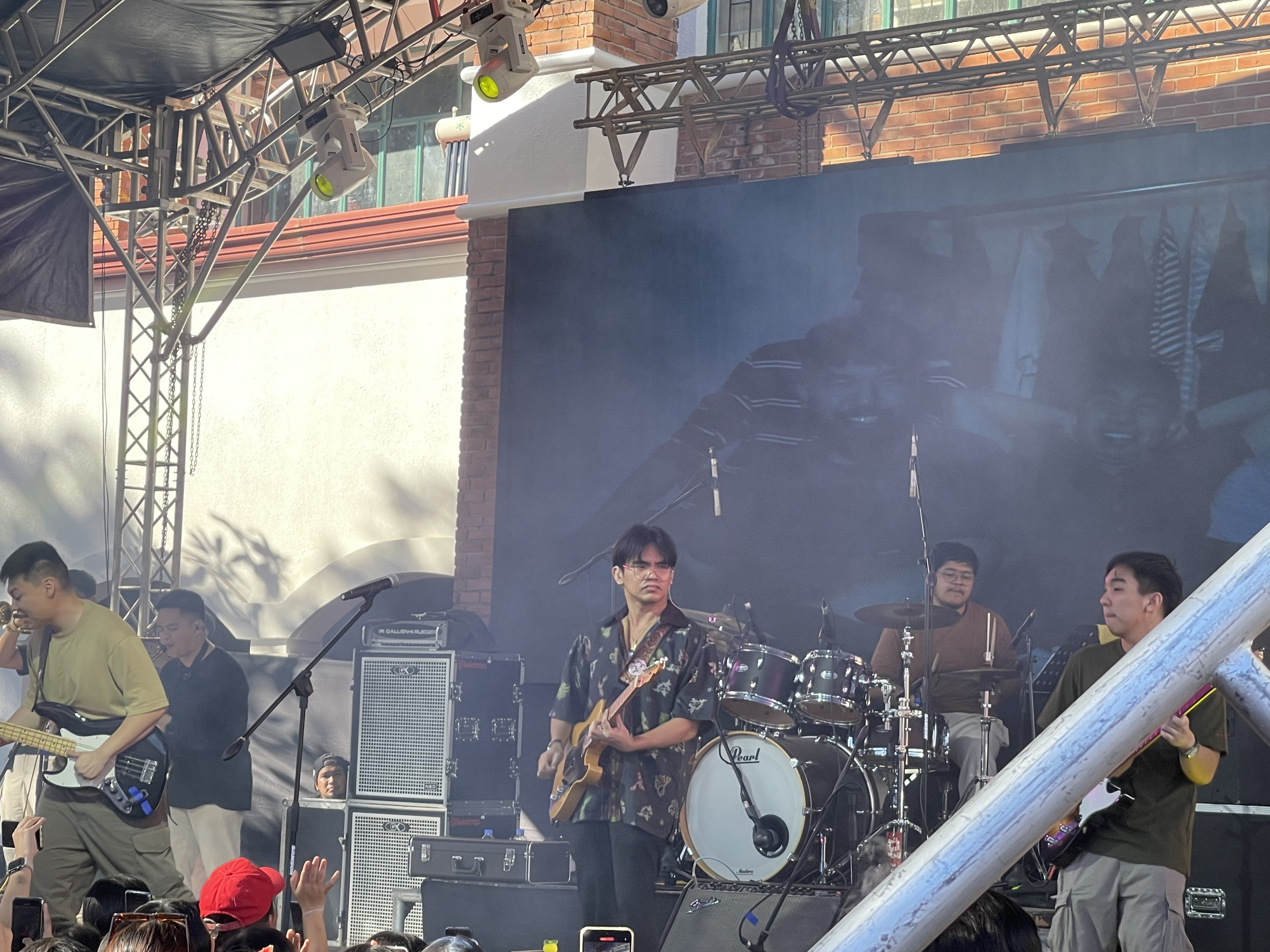
Lola Amour wins Record of the Year at 38th Awit Awards

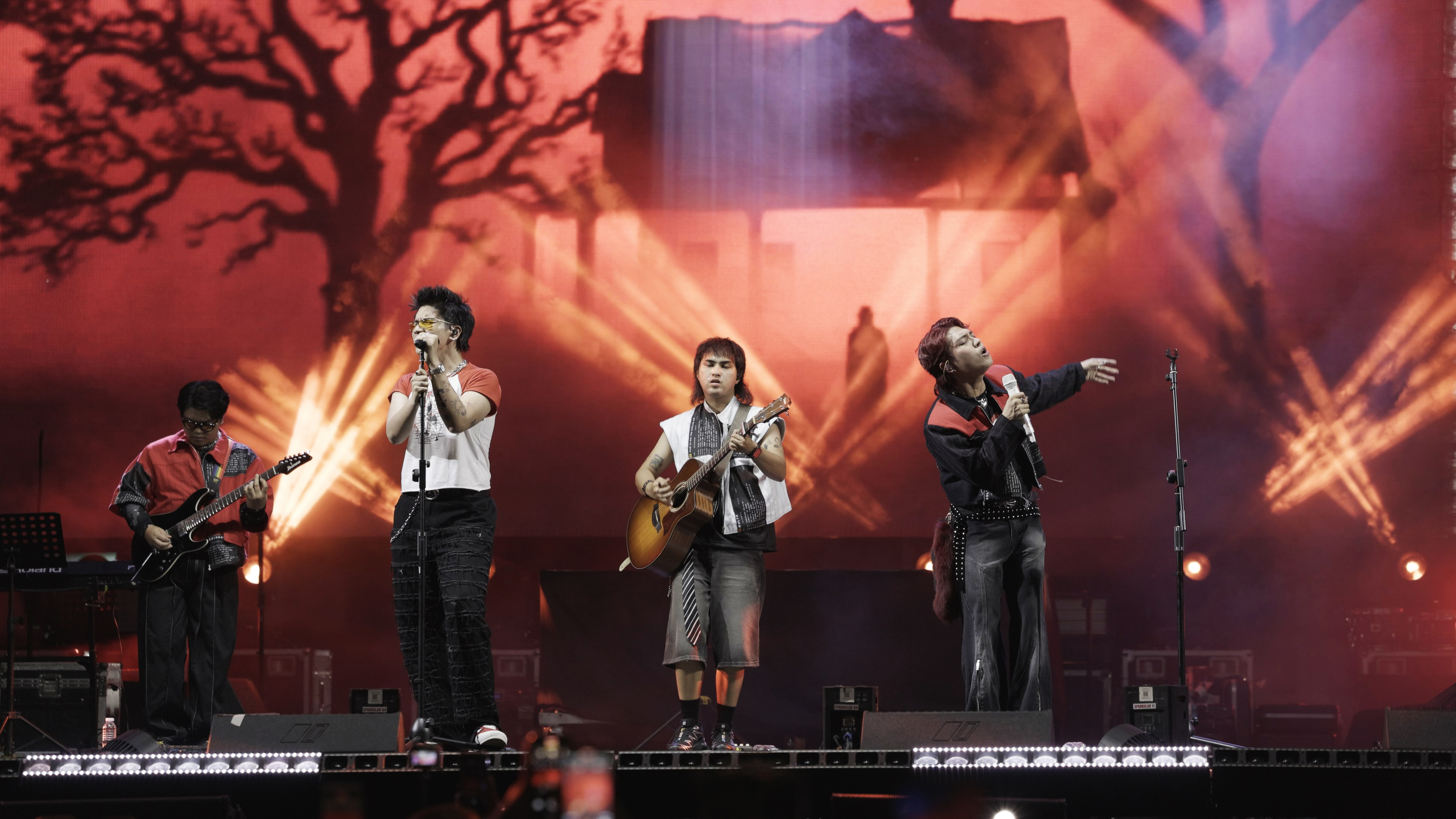
Cup of Joe wins Song of the Year at 38th Awit Awards

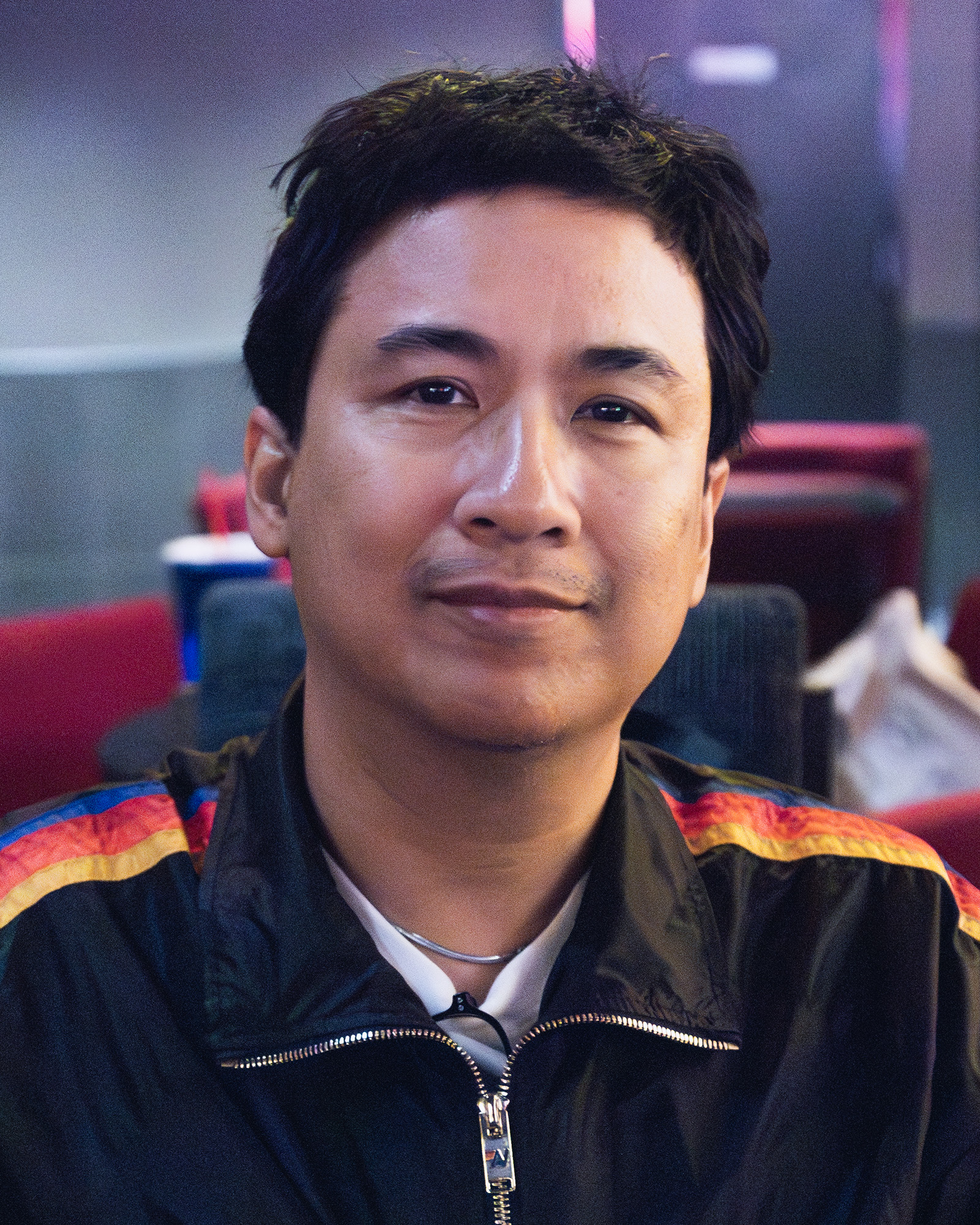
Ely Buendia, winner of Dangal ng Musikang Pilipino

**Album of the Year**: Winner: **Ben&Ben – “The Traveller Across Dimensions”**; “Talaarawan” – BINI; “Olaholah” – SunKissed Lola; “Alegorya” – Munimuni; “Superpower” – Zild; “Lola Amour” – Lola Amour	**Record of the Year**: Winner: **Lola Amour – “Namimiss Ko Na”**; “Nene” – SunKissed Lola; “Heartache Generation” – Ena Mori; “Marilag” – Dionela; “Love Is” – The Ridleys
**Song of the Year**: Winner: **Cup of Joe – “Misteryoso”**; “Sining” – Dionela and Jay R; “Ikot” – Over October; “Pagbigyan” – Sugarcane; “Namimiss Ko Na” – Lola Amour

=== Performance Awards ===
**Best Performance by a Solo Artist**: Winner: **Dionela – “Marilag”**; “ATM” – Ice Seguerra; “I’ll Be Somebody You Want” – Jolianne; “Pauwi Na ‘Ko (Dito Ka Na Lang)” – Dwta; “Alas Dos Na!!!” – Janine Berdin; “Fake Faces” – Felip; “Umaycan” – Noel Cabangon	**Best Performance by a Group Artist**: Winner: **Ben&Ben – “Triumph”**; “Tayo Na Lang” – Nobita; “Lampara” – Press Hit Play; “One Sided Love” – G22; “Sige, Sayaw!” – Dear Dahlia; “Nilalang” – Dilaw
**Best Performance by a New Solo Artist**: Winner: **iLA – “‘Di Maipagkakaila”**; “Alintana” – Muninn; “Panggap” – Plume; “Sickreet” – Ryannah J; “Kahit ‘Di Ako Ang Gusto Mo” – Patricia Heart; “Seryoso” – Lottie Bie	**Best Performance by a New Group Artist**: Winner: **12th Street – “Walang Humpay”**; “Aminin” – Naiba; “Hi, Tita” – Sala; “Bituin” – Letters from June; “Alak” – Karilyo
**Best Collaboration**: Winner: **Dionela and Jay-R – “Sining”**; “‘Pag Ang Puso ang Nagsabi” – JM Dela Cerna and Marielle Montellano; “Ligaw na Bullet” – Denise Laurel and Skusta Clee; “‘Di Ko Kasalanan” – Demi and Gins&Melodies; “Within” – Ladine Roxas and Kris Lawrence; “Sa Kahapon” – Dilaw and Janine Berdin	**Best Dance/Electronic Recording**: Winner: **BINI – “Salamin, Salamin”**; “Tension” – Peyton; “Eksena” – YARA; “Come Over” – Pop Money Worldwide, Carrot Mayor, SHNTI and Aunt Robert; “Hilo” – Paul Pablo

=== Genre Recording Awards ===
**Best Ballad Recording**: Winner: **Moira Dela Torre and Juan Karlos – “Medyo Ako”**; “Ethereal” – Pappel; “Lagi” – Ica Frias; “Kasing Kasing” – Juan Karlos and Kyle Echarri; “Ihilak Lang Na” – Morissette; “‘Di Ko Masabi” – Stell	**Best Rock/Metal Recording**: Winner: **Faspitch – “The Risk”**; “Orange” – Amateurish; “Bawal Lumingon” – CHNDTR; “Dahas” – Kjwan; “Pano” – Caren Tevanny; “Dragon” – Mayonnaise
**Best Alternative Recording**: Winner: **Lola Amour – “Namimiss Ko Na”**; “Homeostasis” – Barbie Almalbis; “A Gentle Reminder to Rest” – Amateurish; “Bulaklak sa Buwan” – Ely Buendia; “Wala Nang Saysay” – Meds	**Best Traditional/Contemporary Folk Recording**: Winner: **Ice Seguerra – “ATM”**; “Ito Lamang” – Project: Romeo; “You’ll Never Feel Alone Again” – Earl Generao; “Nandiyan Pa Ba?” – 6cyclemind and Gloc-9; “Huling Liham” – Paham and Dwta
**Best Rap/Hip-hop Recording**: Winner: **SB19 and Gloc-9 – “Kalakal”**; “Subomoto (Hev Abi remix)” – Zae and Hev Abi; “Utang Clan” – Gloc-9; “Ako Lang ‘To” – XYVRL; “Marikit sa Dilim” – Juan Caoile, Kyleswish and Jawz	**Best Jazz Recording**: Winner: **Debonair District and Alvin Cornista – “Careless Fools” / “Remedios Circle”**; “Superfunk” – GundamFunk; “Get It Right” – Nicole Asensio and Solo .Cal; “Remedios Circle” – Alvin Cornista, Chuck Stevens, Abe Lagrimas Jr., Tim Lyddon and Dave Harder; “What Is It All About?” – Nicole Asensio and Solo .Cal
**Best Instrumental Recording**: Winner: **Alvin Cornista – “Remedios Circle”**; “Nang Buo Kong Buhay” – Jay Gomez and Yvette Parcom; “SuperFunk” – Gundam Funk; “See You on the Other Side” – Lustbass and RJ Pineda; “Good Nights” – Lustbass	**Best World Music Recording**: Winner: **Over Heat and CamSur Made – “Sarung Banggi”**; “You Did It” – KAIA; “Chinese Restaurant” – Nicole Adeya; “Careless Fools” – Debonair District and Jacques Dufourt; “Sabado” – SinoSikat?; “100 Mensahe” – Dan Gil and Marga Jayy
**Best Recording by a Child or for Children**: Winner: **Ateneo Boys Choir – “Nasa Palad Mo”**; “Ang Init Init” – Imogen; “The Phonics Song” – Teacher Cleo; “Tadhana (Easy Lang)” – Giani Sarita; “Jesus, Best Friend” – Ateneo Boys Choir

=== Special Recording Awards ===
**Best Regional Recording**: **Winner: "Kasing Kasing" -** **Juan Karlos and Kyle Echarri / Noel Cabangon**; “Ihilak Lang Na” – Morissette; “Ang Paghuwat” – Morissette and Ferdinand Aragon; “Umaycan” – Noel Cabangon; “Buhi” – Ferdinand Aragon; “Dili Na Lang” – Jolianne; “Panata” – Tothapi	**Best Christmas Recording**: Winner: **Debonair District – “Paskong Mag-Isa”**; “Hesus Aming Hari” – Jonathan Manalo et al.; “Ganito ang Pasko” – Sparkle Singers; “Weather with You” – Lucas Pison, Chezka; “Noche Buena” – Jan Roberts
**Best Original Soundtrack**: Winner: **Regine Velasquez – “Ulit Ulit” in Pamilya Sagrado OST**; “lyo” from Can’t Buy Me Love – Darren Espanto; “Maskara” from Lavender Fields – Ogie Alcasid and Regine Velasquez; “Uuwian” from What’s Wrong with Secretary Kim? – BGYO	**Best Novelty Recording**: Winner: **Introvert Fiesta ft. AJi – “Atras Abante”**; “Da Coconut Nut (DJ Sandy Remix)” – Giani Sarita and DJ Sandy; “Walang Label” – Eugene Layug; “Wala Akong Pake” – Johan Kyle and ANNUHBAE; “Art Song” – Pinkmen
**Best Inspirational Recording**: Winner: **December Avenue – “Face of God”**; “Beautiful Day” – The Company; “Little World Changer” – Belle Mariano; “Ningas ng Pag-Asa” – Jamie Rivera and 92AD; “Dahil Sa’Yo” – Viola Natividad	**Best Pop Recording**: Winner: **Maki – “Dilaw”**; “Bakit Hindi Ka Crush ng Crush Mo” – Itchyworms; “Toyo” – KZ Tandingan; “Yoko Na” – Josh Cullen and Al James; “Hoodie” – Dionela and Alisson Shore
**Best R&B Recording**: Winner: **Jay-R and Dionela – “Sining”**; “Tango” – Jarlo Base; “Marilag” – Dionela; “Call Me What You Want” – Elise Huang; “Fighting for You” – Thyro Alfaro and JP Bacallan

=== Technical Achievement Awards ===
**Best Engineered Recording**: Winner: **“Segundo, Siguro” – Axel Fernandez**; “Pahinga” – Nikhil Armanani; “Nobya” – Carlo Jay Cruz; “Pauwi Na’ko (Dito Ka Na Lang)” – Brian Lotho; “Namimiss Ko Na” – Rene Serna	**Best Musical Arrangement**: Winner: **Kahlil Refuerzo – “Umaycan”**; “Nobya” – Franz Sacro and Choi Padilla; “Bittersweet” – Ashlee Mickaela Factor and Alyssa Janine Cruz; “Namimiss Ko Na” – Lola Amour; “Get It Right” – Gabe Dandan
**Best Remix Recording**: Winner: **ena mori and kenyama**; “Welcome to My World” – Jonathan Manalo and Theo Martel; “Love Is the Answer” – Jonathan Manalo, Moy Ortiz and The Company; “small town (crwn’s crying in the parking lot edit)” – crwn; “different… (kenyama remix)” – kenyama; “WHITE ROOM (Reimagined ver.)” – ena mori	**Best Cover Art**: Winner: **SB19 and Gloc-9 – “Kalakal”**; “Patibong” – Gracenote; “The Traveller across Dimensions” – Ben&Ben; “I’m Okay” – Moira Dela Torre; “Misteryoso” – Cup of Joe
**Music Video of the Year**: Winner: **SB19 and Gloc-9 – “Kalakal”**; “Salamin, Salamin” – BINI; “Namumula” – Maki; “Cherry on Top” – BINI; “Tagpi-tagping Piraso” – Ely Buendia

=== Special Awards ===
**Lifetime Achievement Award**
- Vic del Rosario

**Dangal ng Musikang Pilipino**
- Ely Buendia
