= Miss Kita Kung Christmas =

1976 Filipino Christmas ballad

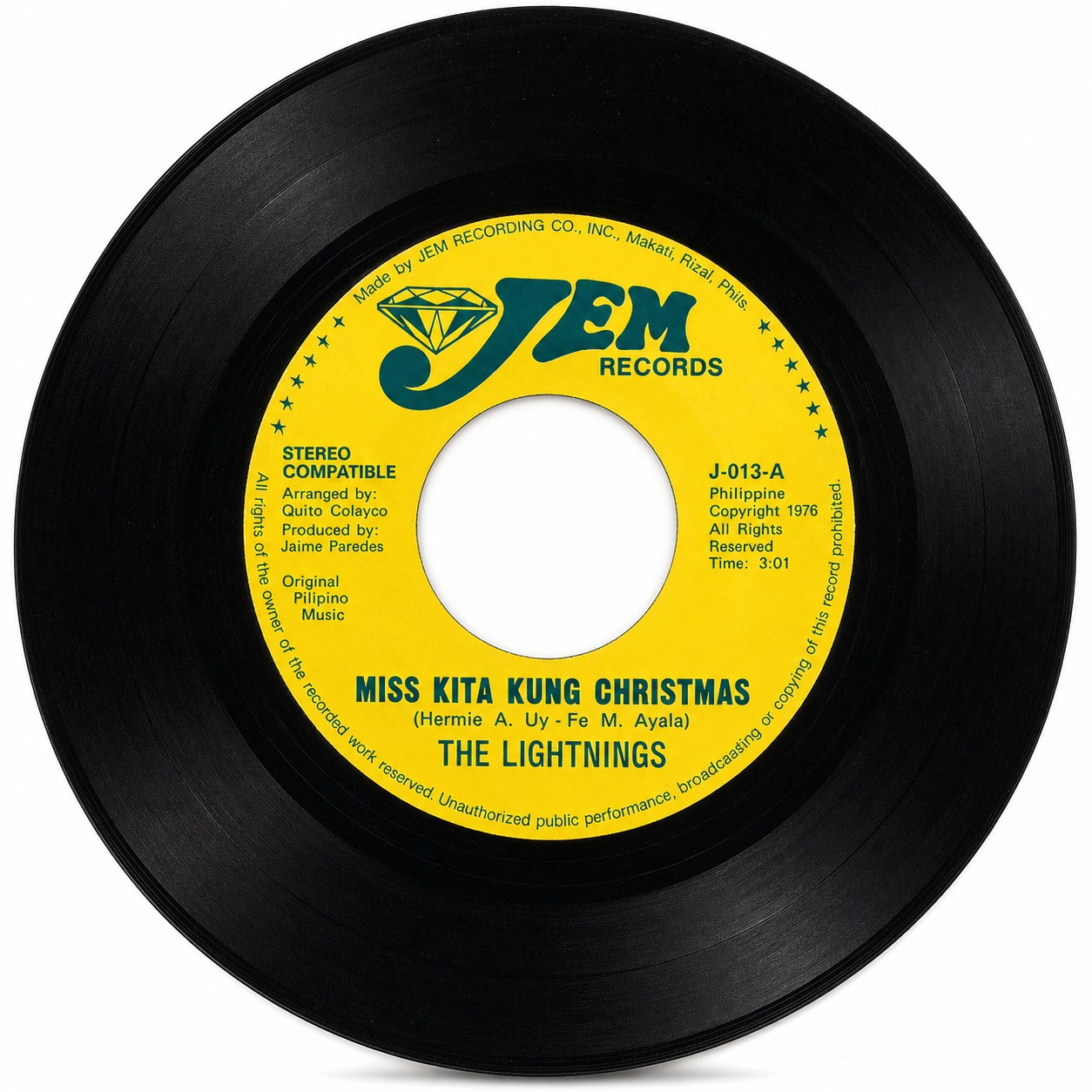
- 7-inch record image of the original recording of Miss Kita Kung Christmas (1976) by The Lightnings

Single by The Lightnings
- Language: Filipino and English
- Released: 1976
- Genre: Ballad; OPM; Manila Sound
- Length: 3:09
- Label: Jem Recording
- Composers: Hermie Uy & Fe Ayala
- Lyricists: Hermie Uy & Fe Ayala

Miss Kita Kung Christmas (Tagalog: "I Miss You During Christmas") is a Filipino Christmas ballad written by Hermie Uy and Fe Ayala. First popularized in the late 1970s, the song is a prominent example of the Manila Sound genre, blending contemporary Western pop arrangements with colloquial Tagalog-English (Taglish) lyrics.

Miss Kita Kung Christmas has become a seasonal staple in the Philippines, frequently played on radio networks and commercial spaces as early as September, and has become the most-covered Christmas song among Filipino singers.

== Background ==
The song was composed during the golden era of the Manila Sound in the 1970s, a musical movement characterized by smooth, radio-friendly pop melodies infused with the everyday spoken language of urban Metro Manila. The music and lyrics were co-written by Hermie Uy and Fe Ayala in 1975.

Musically, the song utilizes standard Western pop ballad structures of its era but applies a distinct thematic sentimentality highly valued in Filipino culture, known colloquially as hugot (a deep emotional pull). While many traditional Filipino Christmas carols utilize structural shifts—moving from a minor key to convey sadness before migrating to a major key to signal holiday joy—Miss Kita Kung Christmas leans consistently into its bittersweet, yearning atmosphere to depict a long-distance or fractured romantic relationship during the holidays.

The song was originally recorded by The Lightnings in 1976. Danny Javier, Boboy Garrovillo and Jim Paredes of APO Hiking Society used to work for Jem Recording in the 70s as executives. The Lightnings was a "mystery recording group" composed of APO Hiking Society, Eddie Munji III, Mike Ayala, and Quito Colayco who had just quit Cinderella then.

== Notable cover versions ==
"Miss Kita Kung Christmas"
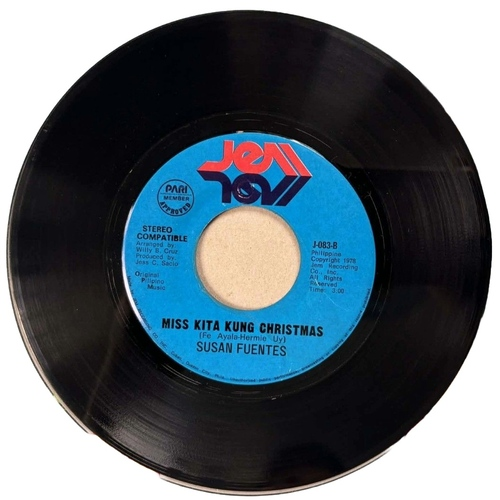
- 7-inch release of Miss Kita Kung Christmas (1978)

Single by Susan Fuentes
- Language: Filipino and English
- Released: 1978
- Genre: Ballad; OPM; Manila Sound
- Length: 3:00
- Label: Jem Recording
- Composers: Hermie Uy & Fe Ayala
- Lyricists: Hermie Uy & Fe Ayala

Originally recorded in the late 1970s, the song achieved widespread national recognition and has since been re-recorded by various generations of major Filipino artists, ensuring its place in the modern OPM (Original Pilipino Music) holiday canon. Notable renditions include:

Susan Fuentes, known as the "Queen of Visayan Songs," recorded Miss Kita Kung Christmas in 1978, two years after the original recording. Her soulful interpretation in her recording in 1978 helped cement the track's popularity as its definitive version of the late 20th century. This was her successful bid to crossover into the Tagalog market. The song became the title track when she released the album Miss Kita Kung Christmas in 1990 under Telesis Records.

Megastar Sharon Cuneta recorded a highly popular version for her 1990 holiday album The Sharon Cuneta Christmas Album, which reintroduced the track to a younger generation of listeners.

Carol Banawa, covered the song for Star Music, delivering a contemporary acoustic-pop rendition that remains a staple on modern streaming platforms during the holidays.

Richard Poon, the country's premier big band crooner, included the song into his 4-track holiday EP entitled Crooner Carols released digitally on 16 December 2023. His rendition featured Idol Philippines champion Zephanie.

| Year | Artist | Album | Notes | Ref. |
|---|---|---|---|---|
| 1976 | The Lightnings (original version) | - | as a single under Jem Recording | |
| 1978 | Susan Fuentes | Miss Kita Kung Christmas | (1) as a single released in 1976 under Jem Recording (2) as title track of her 1990 album under Telesis Records | |
| 1990 | Jake Concepcion | Ang Pamaskong Handog Ni Jake Concepcion | Universal | |
| 1990 | Sharon Cuneta | The Sharon Cuneta Christmas Album | Viva Records | |
| 1991 | Rico J. Puno | Handog Sa Pasko | Viva Records | |
| 1996 | Donna Cruz feat. Cantana | Merry Christmas Donna | Viva Records | |
| 1997 | Philippine Madrigal Singers | Joy (A Choral Celebration of Christmas) | BMG Pilipinas | |
| 1998 | Rocky Lazatin | Sa Araw Ng Pasko | ABS-CBN | |
| 1999 | Side A | Remember December | Warner Music Philippines | |
| 2002 | Ayen Munji-Laurel | Ayen | Viva Records | |
| 2003 | Jessa Zaragoza | The Brightest Stars of Christmas | ABS-CBN | |
| 2005 | Karylle | OPM Superstar Christmas | Universal Records Philippines 26 October 2005 | |
| 2005 | Ryan Cayabyab | Pasko 2 | BMG | |
| 2007 | Ronnie Liang | OPM Platinum Christmas | Universal 1 January 2007 | |
| 2007 | Jay-R Siaboc | Star Magic Christmas | ABS-CBN | |
| 2008 | Martin Nievera | My Christmas List | PolyEast | |
| 2009 | Sarah Geronimo | Your Christmas Girl | Viva Records | |
| 2009 | April Boys | Sana Ay Magbalik | Vicor Music 16 February 2009 | |
| 2010 | Ice Seguerra | The 25th of December (Lite) | Viva Records | |
| 2012 | Bea Binene | Hey It's Me Bea (Christmas Edition) | PolyEast | |
| 2014 | Lyca Gairanod | My Christmas Album All Stars | MCA | |
| 2019 | Morissette and St. Wolf | Single | ABS-CBN Film Productions, Inc. 20 December 2019 | |
| 2020 | Maria Charo Calalo-Laude | Himala’y Laganap | Alakdan Records 15 November 2020 | |
| 2023 | Richard Poon | Crooner Carols EP | Republic Records | |
