= The Hi-Jacks =

Filipino rock band

- Origin: Philippines
- Genres: Rock; pop
- Years active: c. 1962–1980s; 1994–1997
- Labels: Top Tunes; Sunshine
- Past members: Jess Manahan; Ben Tesoro

The Hi-Jacks were a Filipino rock band that formed in the early 1960s. The group was established during a period when rock bands, also known locally as "combos", rose in popularity in the Philippines among young people. Many of their songs consist of covers of pop music from the United States and the United Kingdom, such as "Pa Pa Ou Mau Mau" and "Hey Jude".

In 1969, the Hi-Jacks won the first Awit Award for Vocal Group of the Year (English, Local Division). Later that year, they signed a contract to perform in Tokyo, Japan for six months. By 1972, they had become a regular act at a club in Manila called D'Flame when the group was acquired by the music label Sunshine, a division of Vicor Music.

Towards the late 1980s, the group, which had since become composed of seven members, was the regular act at the Cabaret of the Playboy Club in Manila. In November 1987, the group performed at an Elvis Presley tribute concert held at the Manila Hotel to benefit the Foundation for the Blind of the Philippines, Inc. In February 1988, the band performed as the backing group of Ramon "RJ" Jacinto for the program "Jam Session '88," held at the Coconut Palace in Manila.

In 1994, the band held a reunion concert at Jacinto's RJ Bistro in Makati on October 6.

== Singles ==
Release date	Single	B-Side	Notes
1965	"The Monkey Time"	"Pa Pa Ou Mau Mau"	In Hong Kong, "Pa Pa Ou Mau Mau" peaked at No. 7 on the singles chart.
1967	"I Can't Help Myself"	"I'm Falling in Love Tonight"	With Eddie Mesa; featured in the film Let's Hang On!
1968	"And You Let Her Pass By"	"Birdie Told Me"	
1968	"Hey Jude"		
	"Girl on a Swing"	"I Could Never Love Another"	
	"Chewy Chewy"	"Goody Goody Gumdrops"	
	"Aquarius/Let the Sunshine In"	"Sing a Simple Song"	
	"So Much in Love with You"	"Mony Mony"	

== Filmography ==
- 1964: Let's Go
- 1966: I Just Need Your Love
- 1967: Let's Hang On!
- 1967: Operation: Discotheque
- 1968: Let's Go... Hippie
