= 37th Awit Awards =

2024 award ceremony for Filipino music

- Date: December 4, 2024
- Venue: Music Museum, San Juan City, Philippines
- Country: Philippines
- Presented by: Philippine Association of the Record Industry (PARI)
- Eligibility: 01 January 2023 to 31 December 2023
- Website: awitawards.com

The 37th Awit Awards is an annual music awards produced and staged by the Philippine Association of the Record Industry (PARI), honoring the best achievements in the Philippine music industry. The production followed PARI’s annual format of recognizing excellence in Filipino recorded music across multiple genres and categories. The event maintained a live awards show format featuring on-stage performances, award presentations, and guest appearances from major Original Pilipino Music (OPM) acts. The ceremony highlighted a wide range of genres—from pop and rock to hip-hop and indie.

The ceremony did not have a full scheduled television telecast but was exclusively broadcast digitally through social media and online streaming platforms.

== Background ==
Music releases—such as songs, albums, and related performances—issued within the 2023 calendar year (January 1 to December 31) qualified to join the event. PARI announced the nominees on its Facebook page on 1 July 2024.

== Nominees and winners ==
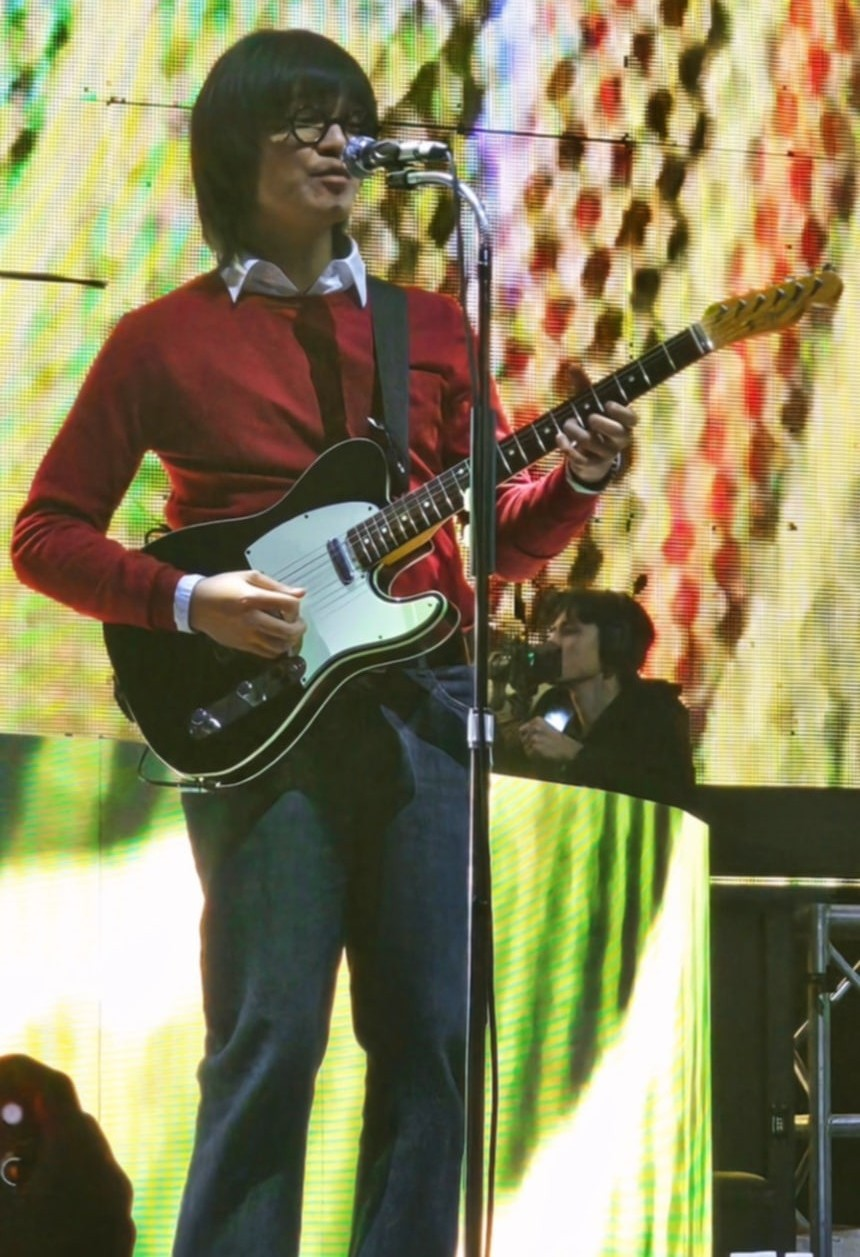
Unique Salonga wins Album of the Year at 37th Awit Awards

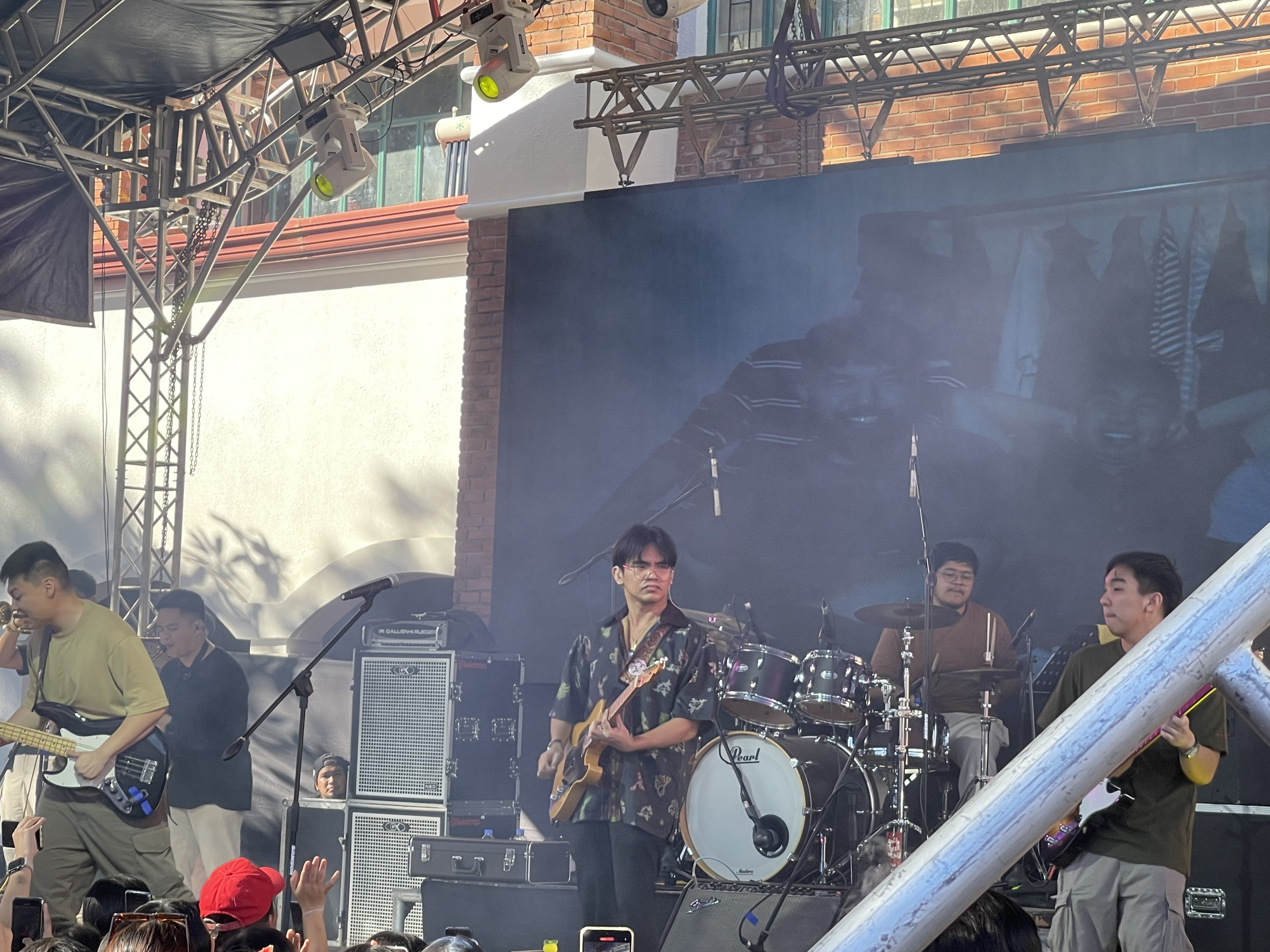
Lola Amour wins Record of the Year and Song of the Year at 37th Awit Awards

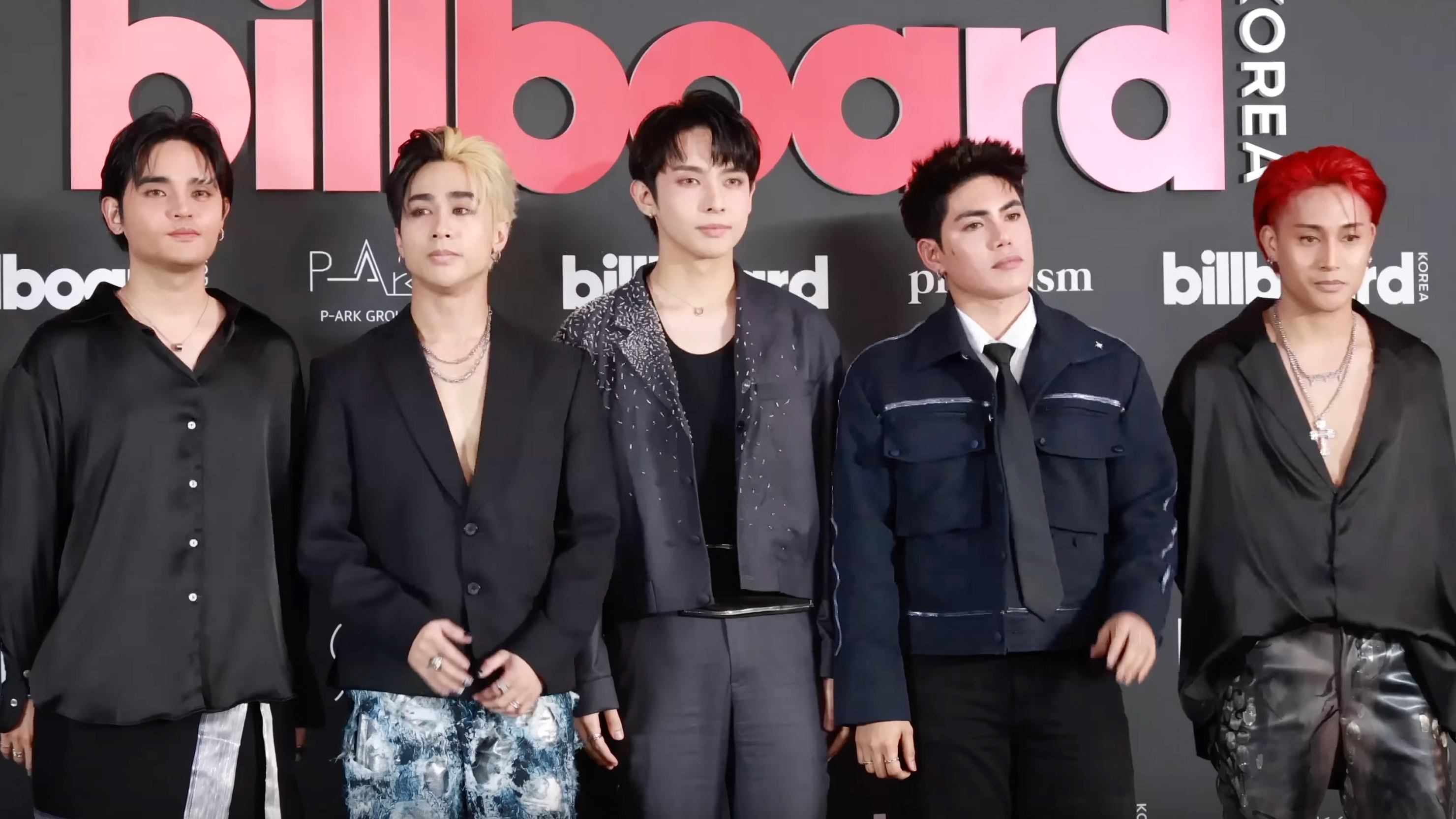
SB19 wins Best Performance by a Group Artist 37th Awit Awards

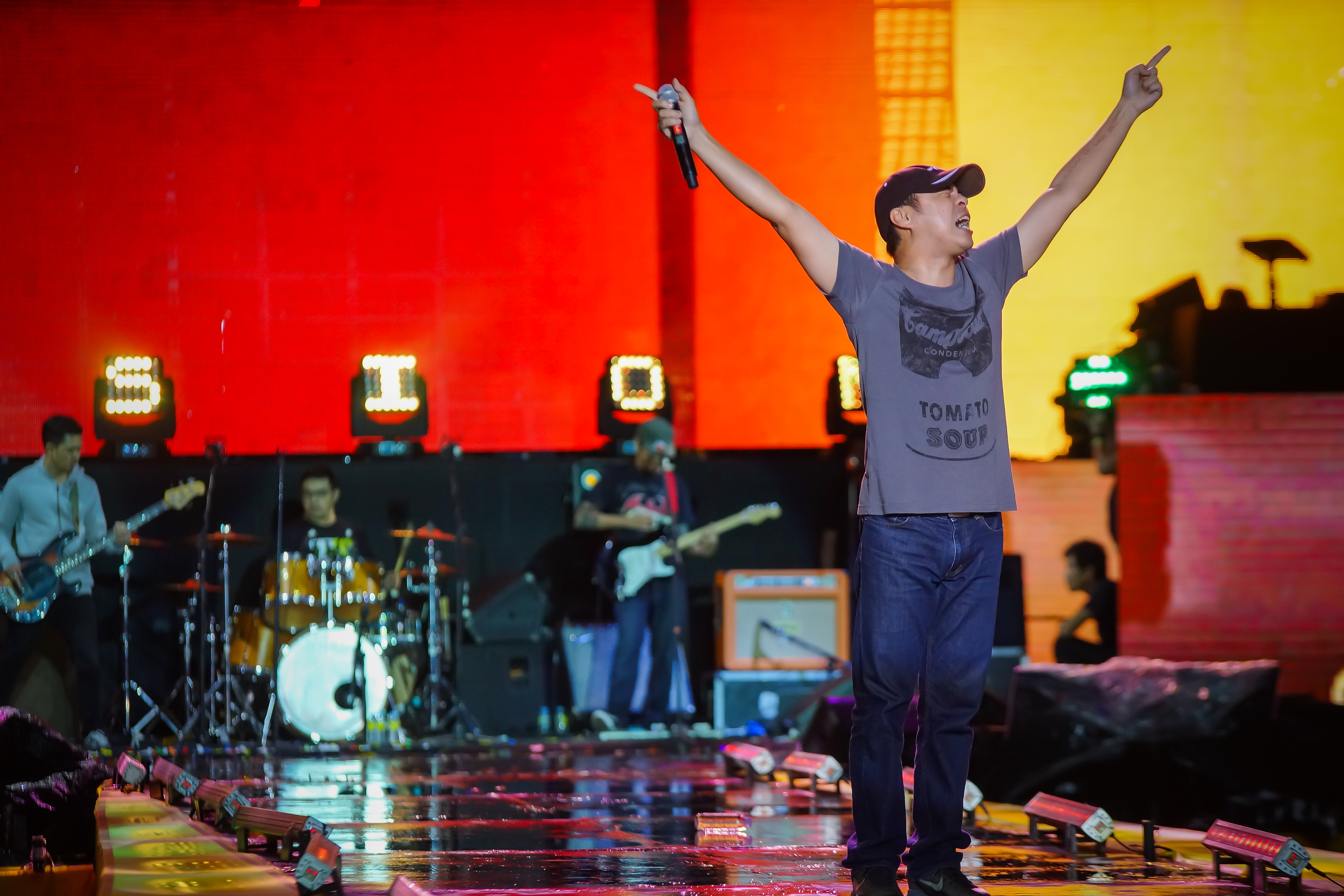
Parokya ni Edgar, winner of Dangal ng Musikang Pilipino Award

Below are the nominees and winners. The winners are listed first and in bold italics.

=== Grand Awards ===
**Album of the Year**: **Winner: Unique T. Salonga – Daisy**; Pagtatag! – SB19; One Click Straight – One Click Straight; Manila in Bloom – Nameless Kids; Patutunguhan – Cup of Joe	**Record of the Year**: **Winner: Lola Amour – "Raining in Manila"**; "GENTO" – SB19; "Panahon" – Unique Salonga; "Ere" – Juan Karlos; "Pantropiko" – BINI
**Song of the Year**: **Winner: Lola Amour – "Raining in Manila"**; "Ere" – Juan Karlos; "Pantropiko" – BINI; "GENTO" – SB19; "Saan?" – Maki	

=== Performance Awards ===
**Best Performance by a Solo Artist**: **Winner: Joey G – "Letting You Go"**; "Pag-ibig (Meron Ba)" – Ace Banzuelo; "'Wag Kang Bibitaw" – Cean Jr; "Gabay" – syd hartha; "Small Town" – Clara Benin	**Best Performance by a Group Artist**: **Winner: SB19 – "Gento"**; "GLNG" – XOXO; "Raining in Manila" – Lola Amour; "Pantropiko" – BINI; "White Toyota" – SunKissed Lola; "Come" – Urbandub; "Laruan" – 1621BC
**Best Performance by a New Solo Artist**: **Winner: Lyka Estrella – "Hawak Mo"**; "hele pono" – JEL REY; "Damdamin" – Misha De Leon; "Muli" – JDP Jack D' Preacher; "Gasera" – Cedric Escobar; "Woke Up like this (Get Up! Get Up!)" – Reese; "Sarili" – Riva Ferrer	**Best Performance by a New Group Artist**: **Winner: Uncle Bob's Funky Seven Club – "Pasabay"**; "Sinulit" – Mint Magic; "Bituin" – Dear Dahlia; "Bakit Papa?" – Yara; "Yayakapin" – Yes My Love
**Best Collaboration**: **Winner: Gloc-9 feat. Gary Valenciano – "Walang Pumapalakpak"**; "Alam" – Sarah Geronimo, John Roa; "Sa Duyan ng Bayan" – Noel Cabangon, Ebe Dancel, Gloc-9; "Pakundangan" – Demi feat. Hev Abi; "Tingin" – Cup of Joe, Janine; "Treading Water" – Sarah Geronimo, Bamboo	**Best Dance/Electronic Recording**: **Winner: SB19 – "Gento"**; "Crimzone" – SB19; "Isulti Lang (Tell Me)" – DJ Young, Paul Pablo; "Day And Night" – Alamat; "Takaw Tingin" – Paul Pablo
**Best Global Collaboration Recording**: **Winner: Troy Laureta, Sheryn Regis, Wendy Moten – "Come In Out Of The Rain"**; "Golden Hour (SB19 Remix)" – JVKE, SB19; "Autodeadma" – Maymay Entrata, Wooseok; "Turn Back Time" – Zack Tabudlo, Violette Wautier	

=== Genre Recording Awards ===
**Best Ballad Recording**: **Winner: Juan Karlos feat. Paolo Benjamin – "Tapusin Na Natin 'To"**; "Himig ng Puso" – Sarah Geronimo; "Liham" – SB19; "Ayokong Masanay" – Jireh Lim feat. Jikamarie; "Paalam, Leonora" – Sugarcane; "Ayoko Na (Acoustic)" – Ica Frias	**Best Rock/Metal Recording**: **Winner: Greyhoundz feat. Gloc-9 – "XXV"**; "Come" – Urbandub; "K-Grind" – Queso; "Buang" – Mayonnaise; "Dust" – Chicosci
**Best Alternative Recording**: **Winner: Juan Karlos – "Ere"**; "Raining in Manila" – Lola Amour; "Wicked Heart" – Barbie Almalbis; "Come" – Urbandub; "Luna" – SunKissed Lola; "Hayaan" – Yno	**Best Traditional/Contemporary Folk Recording**: **Winner: syd hartha – "Gabay"**; "Sa Iyong Mga Mata" – Kat Agarrado feat. Sammy Asuncion; "Courage (Full Band Version)" – Ben&Ben; "Patlang" – Jan Roberts; "Paruparo" – Juan Karlos
**Best Rap/Hiphop Recording**: **Winner: Shanti Dope – "Bad Type"**; "Buhat" – Gloc-9; "Sige Padayon" – John Roa; "Young Gaddy" – Shanti Dope; "TIM" – Meek & Chill	**Best Jazz Recording**: **Winner: Debonair District – "Tawid Bago Tingin"**; "Beyond the Rizal Sky" – Alvin Cornista feat. Skarlet, Bo Razon, Abe Lagrimas Jr.; "Maybe Today Maybe Tomorrow" – Alvin Cornista; "What Matters Most" – Nicole Asensio; "Karakaraka" – Yosha Honasan
**Best Instrumental Recording**: **Winner: Alvin Cornista – "Beyond The Rizal Sky"**; "Ating Cu Pung Singsing" – Ryan Cayabyab, The Philippine Philharmonic Orchestra; "Maybe Today Maybe Tomorrow" – Alvin Cornista; "Justin Time" – Junji Lerma; "Samsara" – Extrapolation	**Best World Music Recording**: **Winner: Chocolate Factory – "Luzviminda"**; "Pagdating" – Sitti; "Sakto" – Sitti; "Makina" – Oh, Flamingo!; "Afternoon Delight" – Alvin Cornista; "Getting High" – High Targets
**Best Recording by a Child or For Children**: **Winner: Young Voices of The Philippines – "Magmasid, Bayang Hinirang"**; "Ituloy Mo Lang" – Gianni Sarita; "Mini Ms. U" – IMOGEN; "Clap Clap Clap" – Kulot; "Learn The 1, 2, 3" – Lucas

=== Special Recording Awards ===
**Best Regional Recording**: W**inner: Faye Yupano and Project Yazz – "Lubi Lubi"**; "Dungdungwen Kan To" – Abby Clutario and Joshua Cadeliña; "Delikado" – Dwta; "Dandansoy" – Asela Labaro, Jesper Mercado, Jobry Cimafranca, Raphael Espada, Rommel Camba, Glenn Aquias; "Tsada Mahigugma" – Maymay Entrata	**Best Christmas Recording**: **Winner: Ryan Cayabyab, Emmy Cayabyab, Krina Cayabyab, Toma Cayabyab – "Isang Taong Lumipas"**; "Maligayang Pasko" – Juan Karlos; "Can't Wait To See You On Christmas Day" – Clara Benin; "Pasko Ang Pinaka Magandang Kwento" – ABS-CBN Music All Star; "Blue Christmas Night" – Jam Quijano
**Best Original Soundtrack Recording**: **Winner: Noel Cabangon, Ebe Dancel, Gloc-9 – "Sa Duyan ng Bayan (Sindihan Song Inspired by Gomburza)"**; "Di Na Babalik" (Replacing Chef Chico) – Leanne & Naara; "Panghabang-Buhay" (Sa Muli) – Xavier; "Hanggang Sa Buwan" (The Rain in España) – Kenaniah; "Be Mine" (High Street Season 1) – Akira Morishita and JL Toreliza	**Best Novelty Recording**: **Winner: Lola Amour, Michael V. – "Waiting Here Sa Pila"**; "Content Ako Sa 'Yo" – Gracenote, Chito Miranda; "Mamamatay Yata Kong Single" – Eugene Layug; "Bookmoko" – Davey Langit; "Ms. Ukay" – Kim Chiu
**Best Inspirational Recording**: **Winner: Quest – "Seek First"**; "Karera" – BINI; "H'wag Kang Mag-Alala" – Noel Cabangon; "Courage (Band Version)" – Ben&Ben; "Faith, Hope, and Love" – Jamie Rivera, Jed Madela, Francine Diaz, KD Estrada	**Best Pop Recording**: **Winner: Lola Amour – "Raining in Manila"**; "Pantropiko" – BINI; "Saan?" – Maki; "GENTO" – SB19; "Lihim" – Arthur Miguel; "Oksihina" – Dionela
**Best R&B Recording**: **Winner: Dionela – "Oksihina"**; "B.A.D." – Denise Julia, P-Lo; "That's Why" – Of Mercury; "Lito" – Jikamarie; "'Wag Kang Bibitaw" – Cean Jr	**Best Cover Art**: **Winner: Rebirth – Graphic Designer: Brandon P. Garcia; Cover Concept: Gabby Alipe and John Dinopol**; Com.Plex – Felip; Tingin – Cup of Joe, Janine; Paki Sabi – SunKissed Lola; Gabay EP – syd hartha
**Best Music Video**: **Winner: Josh Cullen – "Wild Tonight"**; "'Wow, I Finally Learned to Write a Love Song'" – Pappel; "GENTO" – SB19; "I Want You" – SB19; "Karera" – BINI	**Best Musical Arrangement**: **Winner: Rommel & Idonnah Villarico – "Dirty Linen Theme"**; "Justin Time" – Junji Lerma; "Pagdating" – Sitti; "Kay Ganda ng Ating Musika" – Troy Laureta and Martin Nievera; "Remember?" – Jason Dhakal
**Best Vocal Arrangement**: **Winner: Adie, Franz Sacro – "G.K.Y.A.M"**; "Kailan Pa Ma'y Ikaw" – KZ Tandingan; "Unkind" – Dom Guyot; "Salisi" – Davey Langit; "Sino" – Lotti	**Best Engineered Recording**: **Winner: Theo Martel – "Bibitaw Na"**; "Pantropiko" – BINI; "Tsada Mahigugma" – Maymay Entrata; "Treading Water" – Sarah Geronimo, Bamboo; "I Want You" – SB19
**Best Remix Recording**: **Winner: Maymay Entrata feat. Wooseok – "Autodeadma Remix"**; "Raining in Manila (DJ Young Remix)" – Lola Amour; "Vivid (Reimagined Version)" – Ena Mori; "Love You Still (Sunset Version)" – Morissette; "I Wanna Know (DJ Young Remix)" – Ian Sndrz, LVKE, Juliana Celine; "Autumn" – Ben&Ben, Belle Mariano	

=== Digital Platform Awardees ===
**Most Streamed Recording**
- “Uhaw” by Dilaw

=== People’s Voice Category ===
- Breakthrough Artist of the Year: BINI
- Favorite Music Video of the Year: “Karera” by BINI
- Favorite Record of the Year: “Pantropiko” by BINI
- Favorite New Group Artist: Yes My Love
- Favorite Album of the Year: “Somber” by Belle Mariano
- Favorite Collaboration: “Treading Waters” by Sarah Geronimo with Bamboo
- Favorite Song of the Year: “Pantropiko” by BINI
- Favorite Solo Artist: “Habang Buhay” by Sarah Geronimo
- Favorite Group Artist: BINI
- Favorite New Solo Artist: Cedric Escobar

**Most Streamed Artist**
- Ben&Ben

=== Special Awards ===
**Lifetime Achievement Award**
- Ramon Chuaying
- Buddy de Vera
- Danilo Olivares (Posthumous)

**Dangal ng Musikang Pilipino**
- Parokya ni Edgar

== Performers and presenters ==
=== Performers ===
- Lola Amour
- BINI
- SB19
- Josh Cullen
- Juan Karlos
- Parokya ni Edgar
- Shanti Dope
- Dionela

=== Award Presenters ===
- Ryan Cayabyab
- Gary Valenciano
- Noel Cabangon
- Ebe Dancel
- Sarah Geronimo
- Bamboo

=== Attendees / Winners (not explicitly confirmed as performers or presenters) ===
- Unique Salonga
- Joey G
- Lyka Estrella
- Quest
- Maymay Entrata
- Uncle Bob's Funky Seven Club
