= 1st Awit Awards =

1969 Philippine music awards ceremony

- Date: March 23, 1969
- Location: Makati

Highlights
- Most awards: Pauline Sevilla (3)
- Albums of the Year: Her Kind of Music by Norma Ledesma (Local-English); Mabuhay Singers sing Pandangguhan, Dahil sa Iyo and other Philippine Songs by Mabuhay Singers (Local-Vernacular); The Graduate by Simon and Garfunkel (Foreign)
- Singles of the Year: "Ting-A-Ling" by Pauline Sevilla (Local-English) "De Colores" by Pauline Sevilla (Local-Vernacular) "The Sound of Silence" by Simon and Garfunkel (Foreign)

The 1st Awit Awards were held on March 23, 1969, in Makati. These awards recognized musical achievements for the year 1968. This was the only award ceremony organized by the Awit Awards Executive Committee after the Philippine Academy of Recording Arts and Sciences (PARAS) took charge the next year.

A total of 28 awards were presented that night. Another category, the Visiting Recording Artist of the Year, would be given in the foreign division supposedly but due to lack of nominees, it was not awarded. Pauline Sevilla won the most awards with three.

== Winners ==
=== Local Division ===
==== English ====
Female Recording Artist of the Year	Male Recording Artist of the Year
Helen Gamboa	Eddie Peregrina
Vocal Group of the Year	Single of the Year
The Hi-Jacks	"Ting-A-Ling" – Pauline Sevilla
Album of the Year	Composer of the Year
Her Kind of Music – Norma Ledesma	George Canseco
Lyricist of the Year	Musical Arranger of the Year
George Canseco	Doming Amarillo
Best New Recording Artist	Record Producer of the Year
Nora Aunor	Vic del Rosario; Orly Ilacad
Recording Studio of the Year	Record Company of the Year
Cinema-Audio	Mareco

==== Vernacular ====
Female Recording Artist of the Year	Male Recording Artist of the Year
Cely Bautista	Ruben Tagalog
Vocal Group of the Year	Single of the Year
Mabuhay Singers	"De Colores" – Pauline Sevilla
Album of the Year	Composer of the Year
Mabuhay Singers sing Pandangguhan, Dahil sa Iyo and other Philippine Songs – Mabuhay Singers	Constancio de Guzman
Lyricist of the Year	Best Instrumental Album
Constancio de Guzman	Leopoldo Silos^{[A]}

=== Foreign Division ===
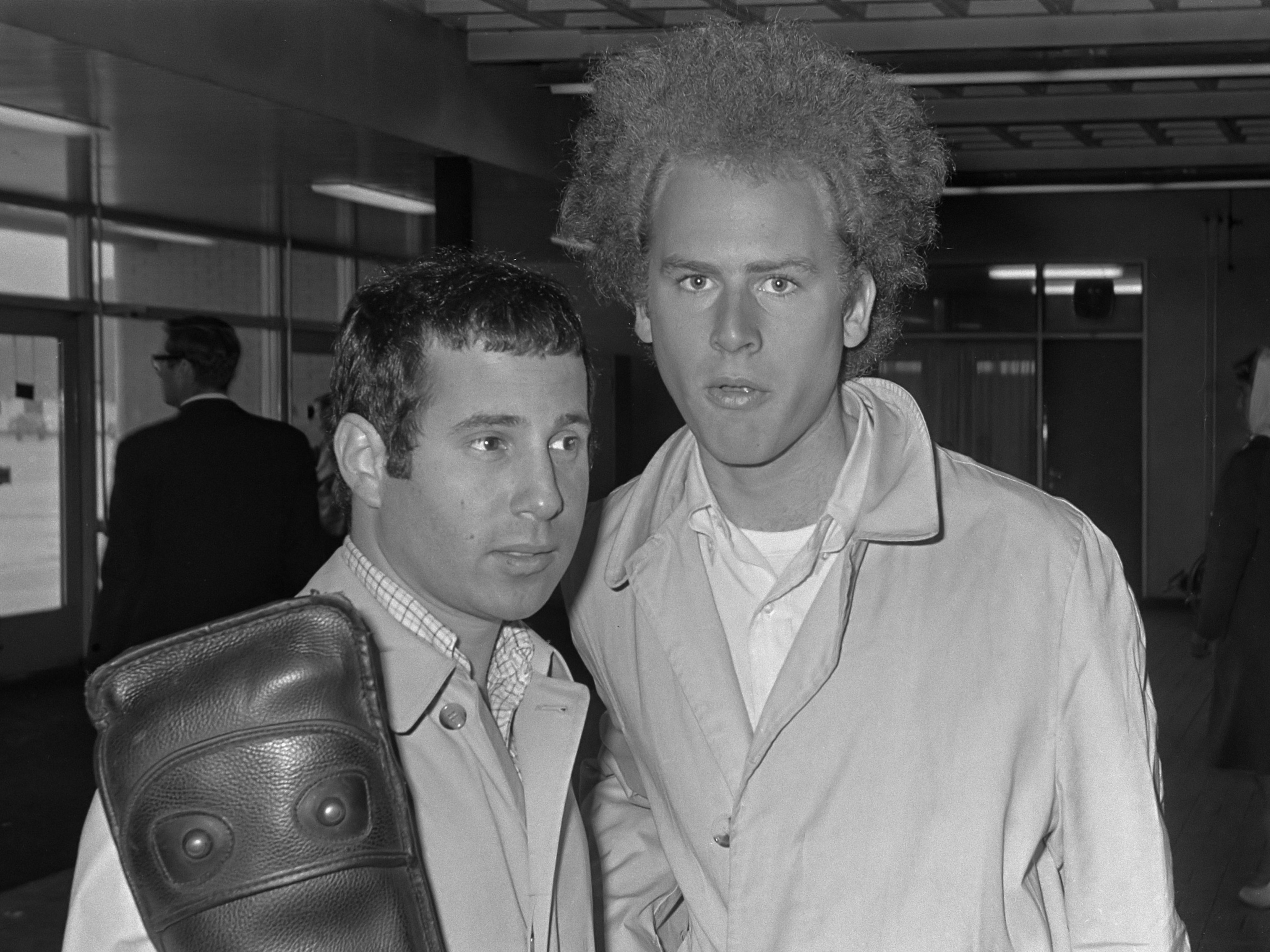
Simon and Garfunkel, Single and Album of the Year (Foreign) winners

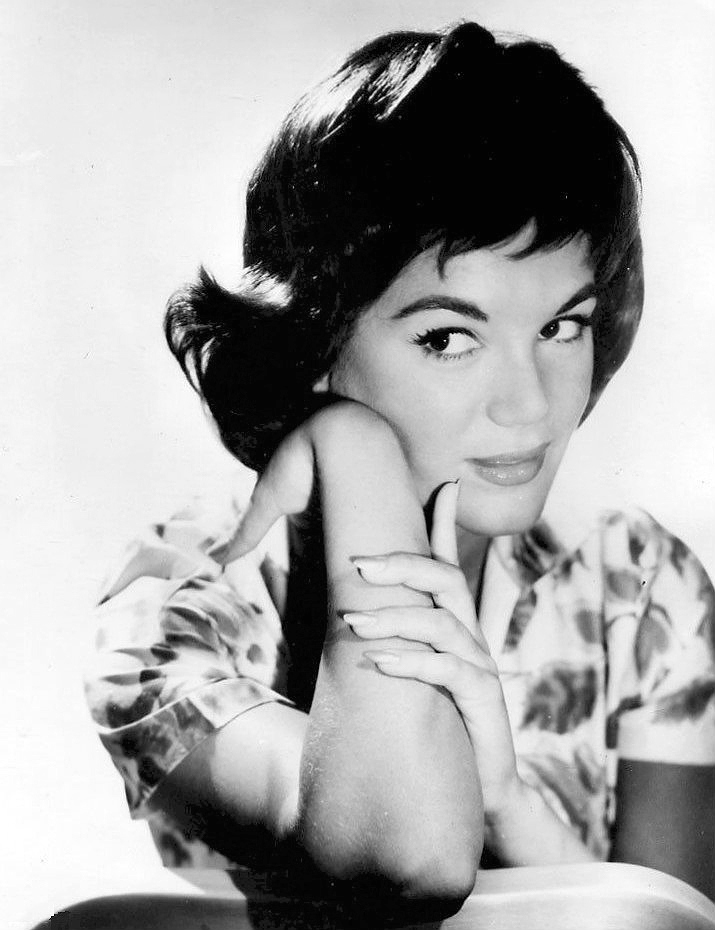
Connie Francis, Female Artist of the Year (Foreign) winner

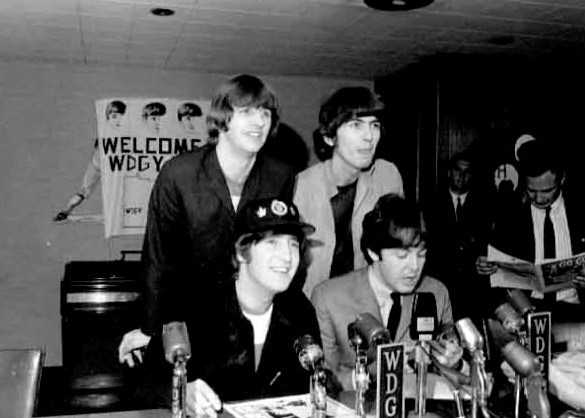
The Beatles, Group of the Year (Foreign) winners

Female Recording Artist of the Year	Male Recording Artist of the Year
Connie Francis	Jack Jones
Vocal Group of the Year	Single of the Year
The Beatles	"The Sound of Silence" – Simon and Garfunkel^{[B]}
Album of the Year
The Graduate – Simon and Garfunkel

=== Special awards ===
Best Special Recording	Record Man of the Year
"Cursillo Song" – Pauline Sevilla	Manuel P. Villar

Notes:

^[A]It is currently unknown which album of Leopoldo Silos won the "Best Instrumental Album".
^[B]Although this single was originally released in 1965, it was included in the album, The Graduate, which, on the other hand, was released in 1968.
