= Jose R. Gullas Halad Museum =

Music museum in Cebu City, Philippines

JRG Halad Museum
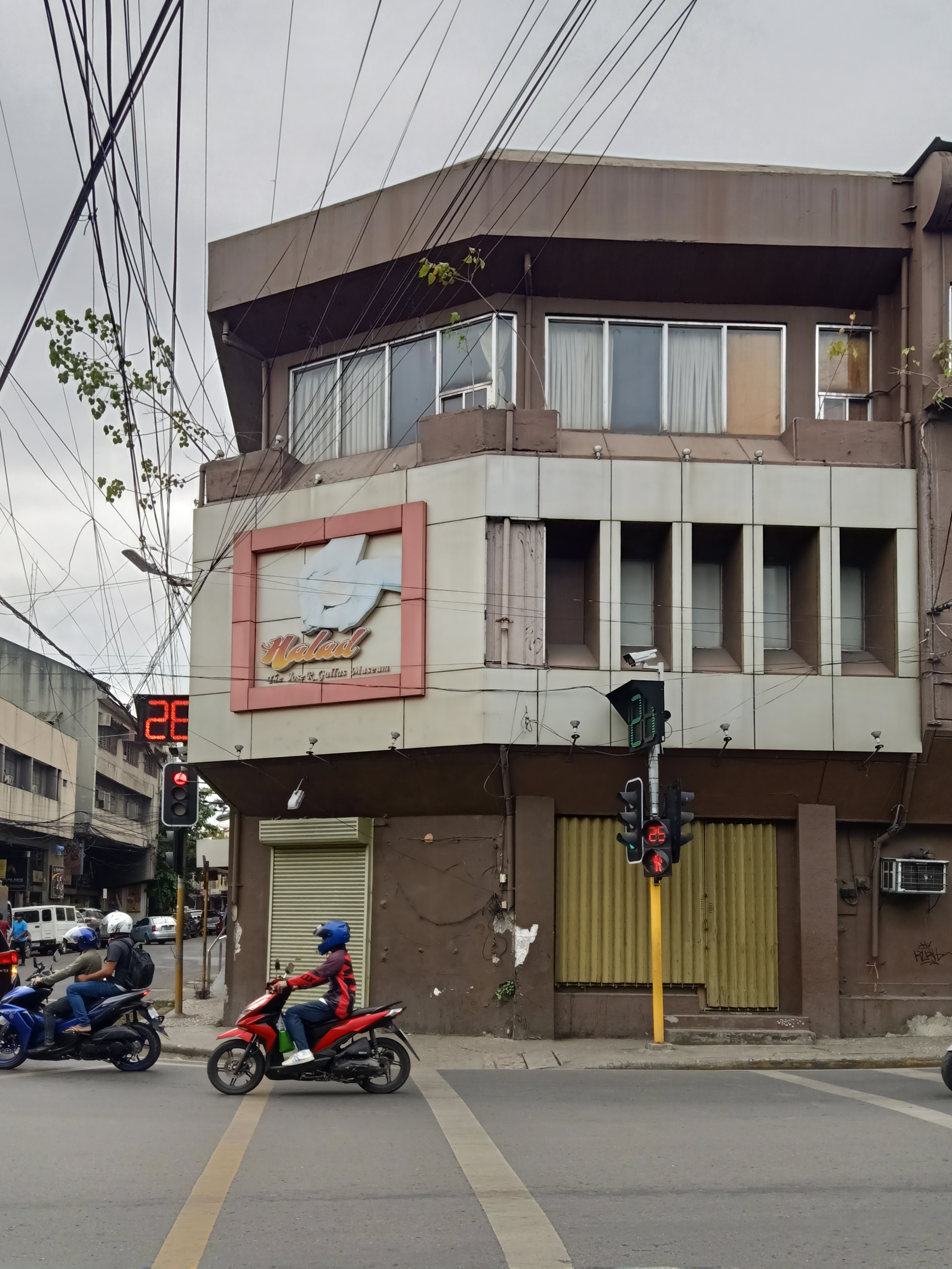
- The museum's exterior in 2024
- Established: 2010
- Location: Cebu City, Philippines
- Coordinates: 10°17′49″N 123°54′08″E
- Type: Music Museum, Heritage Museum
- Founder: Jose R. Gullas

JRG Halad Museum is a musically-themed museum in Cebu City, Philippines that pays homage to the musical heritage of Cebu.

== Location ==
Located along V. Gullas St. (former Manalili) and D. Jakosalem St. Cebu City, the old building of The Freeman Newspaper has been converted into a museum which houses Cebuano and Visayan musical treasures and memorabilia.

== History ==
Founded by Jose "Dodong" R. Gullas, the Halad Museum was inaugurated on January 12, 2010, and opened to the public on February 2, 2010.

With the founder's support, reviving works of long-forgotten composers was achieved via concerts of an award-winning university-based choir, the UV Chorale of which the first of the Halad concerts came about in 2007. In that event, a group of composers were honored posthumously including Ben Zubiri, composer of Matud Nila, and Vicente Rubi, composer of Kasadya Ning Taknaa. This started the donations of family members of the honorees for the three Halad concerts (in 2007, 2008, and 2010) from lyric sheets to instruments, prompting the idea of a repository—a museum. Eventually, the founder was inspired to actively acquire other musical memorabilia, not just to keep the memory of the honorees alive, but also hopefully, to educate youngsters on how rich Cebu's musical heritage is.

Halad means tribute or offering in the Cebuano language, as such, the museum is dedicated to the founder's parents, Don Vicente and Inday Pining Gullas, who founded the University of the Visayas in Cebu, Philippines.

In November 2010, expansion of the museum was carried out to make more room for the increasing collections held by the museum which includes memorabilia of Cebuano composers and artists in the 20th century, from musical instruments, and lyric sheets to long-playing records.

The revamped and completed Halad Museum was opened to the public on June 13, 2011, with more musical pieces on exhibit. The museum features three galleries dedicated to Cebuano music, kinaiyang Sugbuanon (Cebuano cultural traditions), and the founder's gallery.

== Permanent Exhibits ==
The Halad Music Gallery displays composers from the 20th century who have produced well-known Cebuano songs, as well as artists who have earned international recognition for their talents. Highlights include original music sheets and musical instruments played by the composers themselves and numerous awards and personal items from gowns to gadgets owned by the artists. Turntables and digital music stations are also available for visitors.

The musical memorabilia plus instruments occupy the main section of the museum, but with its recent expansion, it is now home to other interests. The Kinaiyang Sugbuanon section showcases the Cebuano traditions over time including life-cycle events, popular practices, and expressions of religiosity in the different artworks depicted. Another gallery is devoted to the founder who pays tribute to the most influential people in his life, his parents and his living commitment to heritage preservation.

== Resolution ==
On June 22, 2011, the Cebu City Council commended the museum founder, Jose R. Gullas, for his efforts to help preserve Cebu's musical and cultural heritage through the Halad Museum. A commendation was made through a resolution sponsored by Councilor Margarita Osmeña, chairperson of the council's committee on tourism and culture.

== See also ==
- List of music museums
