= Pure Donna =

Studio album by Donna Cruz
- Released: 1997
- Genre: Pop, OPM
- Language: English, Tagalog
- Label: Viva Records
- Producer: Vic del Rosario, Jr.

Donna Cruz chronology
Merry Christmas Donna (1996)	Pure Donna (1997)	The Best of Donna (1997)

Singles from Pure Donna
- 1. "Dahil Tanging Ikaw" Released: 1996; 2. "Hang On" Released: 1996; 3. "Isang Tanong, Isang Sagot" Released: 1996; 4. "I Will Be Here to Stay" Released: 1997; 5. "Ikaw Lang ang Mahal" Released: 1997

Pure Donna is the sixth studio album by Filipino singer Donna Cruz, released in the Philippines in 1997 by Viva Records. It was certified platinum a week after it was released, and was certified three-times platinum. The album release coincided with the celebration of Cruz's twentieth birthday.

== Background ==
After the success of Habang May Buhay and Merry Christmas Donna, Cruz began recording songs for her next studio album. By the end of 1996, Cruz was arguably the biggest celebrity in the Philippines, with movies like Muling Umawit ang Puso, Habang May Buhay, Pag-Ibig Ko Sa Iyo'y Totoo and DoReMi performing incredibly well in the local box office. Singles like "Only Me and You", "I Can", and "Wish" have all dominated Philippine radio in 1995, 1996 and 1997.

Several famed producers worked with Cruz on the album, including Trina Belamide (who wrote "Where Could He Be" specifically for Cruz) and Wency Cornejo, who wrote "Sa Ngalan ng Pag-ibig". Vehnee Saturno co-wrote and produced Cruz's remake of the Jaya hit "Dahil Tanging Ikaw". A Taglish version of "Wish" (written by Mike Shepstone and Stephen M. Singer) which was a hit for both Cruz and American singer Jason Everly (son of Phil Everly of The Everly Brothers) and the acoustic solo version of "I Can" were both included in the album. Cruz also recorded a Tagalog version of the Southern All Stars hit "Manatsu no Kajitsu" which was entitled "Isang Tanong, Isang Sagot".

For the promotional campaign of the album, Cruz decided to create music videos for the songs she chose for the album. Songs which she shot music videos included "Where Could He Be", "Hang On" "Somewhere", "Sa Ngalan ng Pag-ibig", "I Can" and "Four Reasons". The music videos created were all shown in the television special Pure Donna, which eventually won Best Musical Special in the 1997 Aliw Awards.

== Singles ==
Pure Donna generated the most singles from any of Cruz's albums. Her remake of "Dahil Tanging Ikaw" was the love theme for the movie of the same name, in which Cruz played twins separated at birth. "Hang On" was released as a promotional second single during the album's release. "Isang Tanong, Isang Sagot" was released as the third single, and was also the theme song of Cruz's last film (with the same title) before her official hiatus. "I Will Be Here to Stay" was released as the fourth single while "Ikaw Lang ang Mahal" was the fifth and final single from the album.

== Track listing ==
No.	Title	Length
1.	"Dahil Tanging Ikaw"	4:34
2.	"Wish"	4:51
3.	"Four Reasons"	5:02
4.	"Sa Ngalan ng Pag-ibig"	4:12
5.	"Where Could He Be"	4:19
6.	"Ikaw Lang ang Mahal"	3:51
7.	"I Will Be Here to Stay"	4:12
8.	"Hang On"	4:28
9.	"I Can"	4:05
10.	"Somewhere"	4:14
11.	"Isang Tanong, Isang Sagot"	4:30
12.	"Smile"	4:08
