= Merry Christmas Donna =

Studio album by Donna Cruz
- Released: 1996
- Genre: Pop, OPM
- Language: English, Tagalog
- Label: Viva Records
- Producer: Vic del Rosario, Jr.

Donna Cruz chronology
Habang May Buhay (1995)	Merry Christmas Donna (1996)	Pure Donna (1997)

Singles from Merry Christmas Donna
- 1. "Muling Sumapit ang Pasko" Released: 1996; 2. "My Only Christmas Is Jesus" Released: 1996

Merry Christmas Donna is the fifth studio album by Filipino singer Donna Cruz, released in the Philippines in December 13, 1996 by Viva Records. The album continued Cruz's streak of unprecedented hit albums, being certified platinum in Christmas 1996. It was the second fastest-selling holiday album behind Jose Mari Chan's Christmas in Our Hearts and the second OPM music holiday album to receive a platinum certification in the same year of its release.

== Background ==
By the end of 1996, Cruz became the most popular female recording artist in the OPM music scene, having earned platinum and gold certifications for her first four albums. After releasing music that mostly had themes about love, Cruz decided to release an album of holiday music, since she wanted to releasing something that gave more of a "thanksgiving" vibe to the fans who have supported her. Soon after filming DoReMi, Cruz was inspired to record her favorite Christmas songs such as "Last Christmas" (originally recorded by Wham!), "My Grown-Up Christmas List" (originally recorded by Natalie Cole) and "It's Just Another New Year's Eve" (originally recorded by Barry Manilow).

In late 1996, Cruz enlisted songwriter Vehnee Saturno to helm the lead single, "Muling Sumapit ang Pasko". Though VIVA Entertainment Group was satisfied with the single choice, Cruz expressed her interest in releasing her favorite song "My Only Christmas Is Jesus", a collaboration with the University of the Philippines Cherubims and Seraphims as a radio single. Both songs were sent to local radio in Christmas 1996.

== Track listing ==
No.	Title	Length
1.	"Muling Sumapit ang Pasko"	4:41
2.	"Miss Kita Kung Christmas"	4:08
3.	"Sa Paskong Ito"	3:52
4.	"Merry Christmas Darling"	3:34
5.	"Christmas Tears"	3:38
6.	"Last Christmas"	4:17
7.	"My Grown-Up Christmas List"	3:21
8.	"Pasko ay Para Sa'kin at Sa'yo"	3:12
9.	"My Only Christmas Is Jesus"	3:34
10.	"It's Just Another New Year's Eve"	3:58
