= Mei Mei (group) =

Filipino girl group formed in 2026

- Mei Mei in 2026

Background information
- Origin: Manila, Philippines
- Genres: P-pop; R&B; dance-pop; OPM
- Years active: 2026–present
- Label: Groovy Garden Records
- Members: Alexa; Jhamayka; Ada; Aerise; Thea; Jessie; Yuni; Dina

Mei Mei (stylized in all caps) is a Philippine girl group formed in 2026 by Groovy Garden Records, a subsidiary label of PULP Group. The eight-member group consists of Alexa, Jhamayka, Ada, Aerise, Yuni, Thea, Jessie, and Dina. They made their official debut on May 31, 2026, with the novelty-pop single "Telebong".

== History ==
=== 2026: Formation and debut ===
Mei Mei was established under Groovy Garden Records, an entertainment label launched by prominent Filipino concert promoters Vernon Go and Happee Sy-Go of PULP Group. The group's name functions as a bilingual play on words; while mèimei (\text{妹妹}) translates to "little sister" in Mandarin Chinese, it simultaneously mirrors the traditional Filipino linguistic custom of duplicating names and nicknames (e.g., Jan-Jan, Mai-Mai).

Following months of pre-debut preparation, Groovy Garden Records officially introduced the lineup to the public. The group held their debut showcase on May 31, 2026, at the SM North EDSA Skydome in Quezon City. On June 4, 2026, the group released their debut single, "Telebong," accompanied by a music video directed by filmmaker Kring Kim. Diverging from the contemporary trend of intense electronic dance music in the P-pop genre, the track was marketed as a festive, lighthearted novelty-pop release.

== Artistry ==
Mei Mei's musical style is primarily characterized by novelty-pop, incorporating festive rhythms and humorous or lighthearted Filipino cultural motifs. The group is structurally divided into two primary sub-units: a Dance Line and a Vocal Line. Additionally, the group utilizes a color-coded concept where each of the eight members represents a specific color identity and persona. The British online magazine &Asian noted the influence of retro doo-wop girl groups like The Marvelettes on Mei Mei's songs.

== Members ==
=== Dance Line ===
- Alexa — Spark Mei Mei (Purple)
- Jhamayka — Cool Mei Mei (Blue)
- Ada — Dolly Mei Mei (Yellow)
- Aerise — Sweet Mei Mei (Lilac)
- Yuni — Groovy Mei Mei (Green)

=== Vocal line ===
- Thea — Princess Mei Mei (Baby Pink)
- Jessie — Power Mei Mei (Red)
- Dina — Diva Mei Mei (Hot Pink)

== Discography ==
=== Singles ===
Title	Release date	Composer(s)	Album	Ref(s)
"Telebong (Hello Po)"	May 29, 2026	Dominic Benedicto	Hello Po!	
"Alembong"	July 3, 2026	Dominic Benedicto	Hello Po!	
"Namamasko Po"	October 9, 2026	Happee Sy	Non-Album single	
"Filipina"	TBA	Dominic Benedicto	Hello Po!	
"Sinta"	TBA	Dominic Benedicto	Hello Po!	

== TV appearances ==
- Jessie — Joined and performed the viral song of Moira Dela Torre’s “Titibo-Tibo” in the second season of The Voice Teens Philippines.
- Dina — Joined and performed in the ninth season of Tawag ng Tanghalan on It's Showtime.
- Thea — Joined and performed "Hulog ng Langit" by Donna Cruz on the third season of The Voice Kids Philippines, she also joined in Tawag ng Tanghalan School Showdown, Wowowin‘s Will to Win in 2018 and Lola's Playlist in 2017.
