= Donna (album) =

Studio album by Donna
- Released: 1989
- Genres: Pop, OPM
- Languages: English, Tagalog
- Label: Viva Records
- Producers: Vic del Rosario, Jr.

Donna chronology
Donna (1989)	Kurot sa Puso (1993)

Singles from Donna
- 1. "Kapag Tumibok ang Puso" Released: 1991; 2. "Rain" Released: 1990; 3. "Boy (I Love You)" Released: 1990; 4. "Ba't Di Mo Sabihin" Released: 1991

Donna is the self-titled debut album by Filipino singer Donna Cruz (then using the mononym Donna), released in 1989 by Viva Records in the Philippines. Cruz received an award for Best New Female Recording Artist at the 1992 Awit Awards. It spawned the hits "Rain" (a Boy Mondragon original), "Boy (I Love You)" (a Cherie Gil original) and the lead single, "Kapag Tumibok ang Puso", which was Cruz's debut single and breakthrough hit.

The album was re-issued in 1991 in compact disc format which included a bonus track entitled "Ba't Di Mo Sabihin", a duet with Filipino balladeer and former Smokey Mountain member Tony Lambino. The album became the biggest-selling debut album by a female artist, being certified 9× Platinum in the Philippines.

== Background ==
After Cruz won Bulilit Bagong Kampeon in 1987, she signed a recording contract with Viva Records, becoming the youngest artist on the label. Initially conceptualized as a cover album, Cruz recorded tracks such as "Somewhere" from West Side Story and "Rain", a Boy Mondragon original. However, Vic del Rosario, Cruz' executive producer, secured a demo from Aaron Paul, which was "Kapag Tumibok ang Puso", and asked Cruz to sing it. Satisfied with the results, Del Rosario enlisted Snaffu Rigor, who wrote Cherie Gil's classic teenybopper hit "Boy (I Love You)" to write more bubblegum pop songs for the album. Cruz ended up recording "Boy (I Love You)" and three more songs penned by Rigor.

Cruz recorded all the songs at the age of twelve, making her the youngest artist from Viva Records to ever record a full studio album. In 1991, Donna was generally well received by the public and earned a double platinum certification, making her the youngest artist to ever reach platinum in the Philippines.

== Promotion ==
Cruz embarked on a promotional campaign performing the lead single "Kapag Tumibok ang Puso" on German Moreno's That's Entertainment. She appeared as herself in the movie Andrew Ford Medina: 'Wag Kang Gamol! and performed the lead single in its dance break. Promotion of the album extended until 1991, in which a duet with Tony Lambino entitled "Ba't Di Mo Sabihin" was included in the re-release of the album as part of the soundtrack for the 1991 remake of the film, Darna. Lambino and Cruz also teamed up as screen partners for the said movie.

== Track listing ==
No.	Title	Writer(s)	Length
1.	"Wow!"	Snaffu Rigor	4:14
2.	"Boy (I Love You) (Adaptation)"	Snaffu Rigor	4:56
3.	"Kapag Tumibok ang Puso"	Aaron Paul	4:02
4.	"Nais Ko"	Vehnee Saturno	4:43
5.	"Rain"	George Canseco	3:25
6.	"Pakipot"	Mon del Rosario	5:08
7.	"Falling in Love for the First Time"	Conrad Favorito	4:28
8.	"10 Ka Sa Akin"	Snaffu Rigor	3:55
9.	"Sa Ilalim Ng Unan"	Snaffu Rigor	3:48
10.	"Somewhere"	Leonard Bernstein, Stephen Sondheim	4:04

== See also ==
- List of best-selling albums in the Philippines
