= Langit Na Naman =

Studio album by Donna Cruz
- Released: 1994
- Genre: Pop, OPM
- Language: English, Tagalog
- Label: Viva Records
- Producer: Vic del Rosario, Jr.

Donna Cruz chronology
Kurot Sa Puso (1992)	Langit Na Naman (1994)	Habang May Buhay (1995)

Singles from Langit Na Naman
- 1. "Langit Na Naman" Released: 1994

Langit Na Naman is the third studio album by Filipino singer Donna Cruz, released in the Philippines in 1994 by Viva Records. It spawned the cover single "Langit na Naman" which was also in the soundtrack of Cruz' 1995 movie, Love Notes: The Movie. The album was digitally released by Viva Records on iTunes in January 2002.

== Background and promotion ==
After the release of Kurot Sa Puso, Cruz began transitioning as a movie actress, appearing in supporting roles for blockbuster comedy movies like Manchichiritchit, Row 4: Ang Baliktorians, Pintsik and Ang Boyfriend Kong Gamol, as well as a lead role in Kadenang Bulaklak. Despite her busy schedule, Cruz was able to squeeze recording sessions for her third album. Continuing the trend of releasing bubblegum pop music, Langit Na Naman enlisted songwriters that captured the teenybopper 'Donna' sound. The song "Langit Na Naman" (originally recorded by Filipino band Hotdog) was released as the first and only single. Soon after the release of the album, Cruz began working on a soap opera called Villa Quintana.

== Track listing ==
No.	Title	Length
1.	"Nyeh, Nyeh, Nyeh, Nyeh, Nyeh"	3:17
2.	"Langit Na Naman"	3:45
3.	"Ikaw Na Kaya"	4:34
4.	"YRU So Baduy"	3:02
5.	"Proud 2B Pinoy"	3:27
6.	"May Tama Pa Rin"	3:37
7.	"I Can Learn to Love You"	3:54
8.	"Every Inch a Woman"	3:01
9.	"Pangarap Na Bituin"	4:21
10.	"Dalaga Ka Na (Camay Soap Theme)"	3:33
