= Kadenang Bulaklak =

1994 Filipino film

- Directed by: Joel Lamangan
- Written by: Lualhati Bautista
- Produced by: William Leary
- Starring: Vina Morales; Ana Roces; Donna Cruz; Angelu de Leon
- Cinematography: Loreto Isleta
- Edited by: Jess Navarro
- Music by: Willy Cruz
- Production company: Viva Films
- Distributed by: Viva Films
- Release date: April 14, 1994
- Running time: 128 minutes
- Country: Philippines
- Language: Filipino

Kadenang Bulaklak is a 1994 Philippine drama film directed by Joel Lamangan. The film stars Vina Morales, Ana Roces, Donna Cruz and Angelu de Leon.

== Plot ==
Jasmin, Baby, Violy and Daisy are siblings who lost their parents Elsa and Domeng in a bus accident after their scheduled out-of-town radio drama performance. Left under the care of young couple Tere and Merto after their parents' death, as they were attempting to start a family of their own. They could only remain guardians for Jasmin, but not her siblings. Jasmin gets separated from her siblings when Father Barrientos sends Baby, Violy and Daisy for adoption.

Years later, Jasmin decides to stop attending school to pursue the search of her now-grown siblings despite the objections of Father Barrientos and her Aunt Tere. She decides to go to Manila where she gets employed by a job agency who assigns her to a fast-food restaurant owned by Conchita Carbonell. Unknown to her, Baby, Violy and Daisy already lead individual lives in Manila where they were adopted by various families. Violy was adopted by a strict couple who strongly objects to her dreams of becoming a singer. Daisy was adopted by a rich couple who has a hard time dealing with her tantrums and child-like behavior that stemmed due to the trauma of losing her parents. While Baby was adopted by Conchita Carbonell who owns the restaurant where Jasmin works.

At the restaurant, Jasmin gains friends in Manuel, Nenita and Ruben who helps her get connections to locate her sisters in an orphanage, only to yield a fruitless search. She only gets further hope when Lando joins her in Manila as her co-worker at the same restaurant and also helps in the search.

It was during her work at the restaurant where she meets Conchita's spoiled daughter Baby and her boyfriend Nestor. Jasmin gets exposed to the labor malpractices at both the agency and the restaurant where she later on gets fired for it. When Ruben suddenly dies during the laborers' strike at the restaurant due to a lingering illness, Jasmin gets reinstated by Nestor who grew close to her after she reminded him to be more compassionate at work. This gets the ire of Baby and they get into a conflict.

Meanwhile, Lando resigns from his job at the restaurant after learning that Jasmin and Nestor get closer to one another. He returns home to their town where he finds out that one of Jasmin's sister Violy had dropped by to visit Aunt Tere and Father Barrientos. Violy, who is now a rising singer, gave the address to an assistant to Father Barrientos while learning thru Merto that their Aunt Tere had died due to ovarian cancer. Merto realizes that since Tere could not bear any children, Violy makes him realize that he made a mistake in telling Tere to have Father Barrientos put them up for adoption, when they could have been a family the entire time. This leads Lando to drop by at Violy's rehearsal place where he tells Violy that he has found Jasmin. Violy drops by at the restaurant where she reunites with Jasmin while the two of them reunite with Daisy after visiting her at the Hidalgo household. It was Violy and Daisy who first reunited when Mrs. Hidalgo notices Daisy humming to the song that was sung by Violy on television.

Jasmin then was able to get a lead where she found out that Baby was adopted as a child by Ms. Carbonell after learning this from Nestor, who talked with Ms. Carbonell after she recognized her last name from Jasmin's employment application and told him the truth about Baby. Jasmin confronts Baby on the reality, but Baby denies she was adopted. Jasmin leaves the documents and the pictures they had as little girls as proof. Later on, after Baby sees the pictures and the documents she came to her senses and decides to show up at Violy's concert where Jasmin and Daisy were already there to provide support. After a tearful reunion, Violy introduces her three sisters to the public where they sang the song that their parents taught them: Kadenang Bulaklak.

After the concert, the now-reunited sisters with their respective families went to their real parents' grave. After resolving they will still see each other now and then, Lando proposes to Jasmin it was now time for them to live together and start a new family, to which Jasmin accepts.

== Cast ==
- Gloria Romero as Mrs. Doctolero
- Charito Solis as Ms. Conchita Carbonell
- Nida Blanca as Elsa Abolencia
- Boots Anson-Roa as Mrs. Hidalgo
- Luis Gonzales as Domeng Abolencia
- Vina Morales as Jasmin Abolencia
- Ana Roces as Baby Abolencia
- Donna Cruz as Violy Abolencia
- Angelu de Leon as Daisy Abolencia
- Gary Estrada as Lando Baquiran
- Rustom Padilla as Nestor Rocha
- Dale Villar as Robert de Vera
- Raffy Rodriguez as Manuel Rosano
- Giselle Sanchez as Nenita Dela Cruz
- Pinky Amador as Tere
- Mandy Ochoa as Merto
- Pete Roa as Mr. Hidalgo
- Tony Mabesa as Mr. Benigno Doctolero
- Rolando Tinio as Father Barrientos
- Jeffrey Hidalgo as Jerry
- Jessa Zaragoza as Sarah Quintos
- Jim Pebanco as Ruben Paez
- Tyrone Sason as Norman
- Cesar Burbos as Joey Sanchez
- Ces Mathay as Mr. Hernando
- Frank Rivera as Manager of Agency
- Ester Chavez as Sister Ester
- Lora Luna as Luz Paez
- Alma Lerma as Landlady
- Inday Badiday as herself
- Don Pepot as Pepot
- Marie Barbacui as Maria

== Awards ==
Year	Awards	Category	Recipient	Result	Ref.
1994	42nd FAMAS Awards	Best Screenplay	Lualhati Bautista	Won	
1995	6th YCC Awards	Best Screenplay	Lualhati Bautista	Nominated	
