= Jessie Lasaten =

Filipino composer and producer

Jessie Q. Lasaten (born 1960s) is a Filipino composer and animation producer.

== Early life and education ==
Lasaten attended elementary school and high school at the Saint Louis University in Baguio. During third grade, Lasaten realized that he was partially deaf in his left ear. He was a first-year political science student at the university when he gained the desire to pursue a career in music.

After graduating from Saint Louis, Lasaten proceeded to attend the Berklee College of Music in Boston, Massachusetts, where he later graduated summa cum laude.

== Career ==
After graduating from Berklee, Lasaten returned to the Philippines in the early 1990s and was hired as a jingle writer. In 1994, he was encouraged by Dodie Lucas of RoadRunner Network to become a film composer, and was eventually referred by songwriter Nonoy Tan to OctoArts Films. Lasaten's debut film score was for the film Loretta, which was later embroiled in the 1994 Manila Film Festival scandal.

Lasaten has been the resident composer for ABS-CBN and its film outfit Star Cinema, having headed by 2000 the Music and Sound Group of the ABS-CBN-owned post-production company RoadRunner Network (now defunct). In 2000, he composed the musical score for the ABS-CBN television series Pangako sa 'Yo. In addition to his film scores, Lasaten has also composed music for several Christmas station IDs of ABS-CBN since the 1990s, such as the 2004 Christmas station ID he composed with lyricist Robert G. Labayen: "Sabay Tayo, Kapamilya".

In 2007, as CEO of Cutting Edge Productions, Lasaten began producing the animated fantasy film Dayo: Sa Mundo ng Elementalia, for which he also served as composer; it was theatrically released on December 25, 2008, as an entry to the 34th Metro Manila Film Festival. His company later provided additional animation for El Americano: The Movie, a 2016 Mexican-American animated film produced by Animex Producciones.

== Film scores ==
=== 1990s ===
Year	Title	Director(s)	Studio(s)	Notes
1994	Loretta	Mel Chionglo	OctoArts Films	
1994	Manolo en Michelle: Hapi Together	Mike Relon Makiling	OctoArts Films	
1994	Ikaw Lamang, Wala Ng Iba	Pablo P. Santiago	MegaVision Films; Santiago Bros. Productions	
1994	Mama's Boys 2 (Let's Go Na!)	Tony Y. Reyes	OctoArts Films	
1995	Barkada: Walang Atrasan	Junn P. Cabreira	OctoArts Films	
1995	Patayin sa Sindak si Barbara	Chito S. Roño	Star Cinema	
1995	Muntik Nang Maabot ang Langit	Manuel "Fyke" Cinco	OctoArts Films	Credited on the poster only
1995	Best Friends	Tony Y. Reyes	MAQ Productions	
1995	Tong-Its	J. Erastheo 'Baby' Navoa	Neo Films	
1995	Sabado Nights	Romy V. Suzara	Neo Films	
1995	Dahas	Chito Roño	MAQ Productions	
1995	Isko: Adventures in Animasia	Mike Relon Makiling & Geirry A. Garccia	OctoArts Films	Partially animated film
1996	Batang Z	Bey Vito	MAQ Productions	
1996	Habang May Buhay	Mac C. Alejandre	Viva Films	
1996	Radio Romance	Jose Javier Reyes	Star Cinema	
1996	Dead Sure	Tikoy Aguiluz	Neo Films	Original title: Segurista
1996	Madaling Mamatay, Mahirap Mabuhay	Ronn-Rick	Neo Films	
1996	Daddy's Angel	Joey Romero	Mother Studio Films	
1996	Nights of Serafina	Joey Gosiengfiao	Mother Studio Films	
1996	Wanted: Perfect Mother	Ike Jarlego Jr.	Neo Films	
1996	Kung Alam Mo Lang	Boots Plata	Kaizz Ventures; MAQ Films	
1996	Hawak Ko Buhay Mo	Ronn-Rick	Neo Films	
1996	Akin ang Puri	Toto Natividad	MAQ Productions	
1996	Istokwa	Chito S. Roño	MAQ Productions	
1996	Bakit May Kahapon Pa?	Joel Lamangan	Viva Films; IAM Productions	
1996	Batang Estero	Deo J. Fajardo Jr.	FLT Films International	
1996	Rubberman	Edgardo "Boy" Vinarao	OctoArts Films; Cinemax Studios	
1997	T.G.I.S.: The Movie	Mark Reyes	Viva Films	
1997	Shake, Rattle & Roll VI	Maurice Carvajal; Frank G. Rivera; Anton Juan	MAQ Productions; Regal Films	
1997	Kriselda: Sabik sa 'Yo	Abbo dela Cruz	Canary Films	
1997	Ibulong Mo sa Diyos 2	F. C. Gargantilla	Regal Films	
1997	Go Johnny Go	Ipe Pelino	Regal Films	
1997	Adarna: The Mythical Bird	Geirry A. Garccia	Guiding Light Productions; FLT Films	Animated film
1997	Nasaan ang Puso	Chito S. Roño	MAQ Productions	
1998	Silaw	Mark Reyes	Viva Films	
1998	Bata, Bata... Pa'no Ka Ginawa?	Chito S. Roño	Star Cinema	
1998	Babae sa Bintana	Chito S. Roño	Regal Films	
1999	Bakit Pa?: The Movie	Jose Javier Reyes	OctoArts Films; GMA Films	
1999	Soltera	Jerry Lopez Sineneng	Star Cinema	
1999	Hey Babe!	Joyce Bernal	Star Cinema	
1999	Bulaklak ng Maynila	Joel Lamangan	Viva Films	
1999	Esperanza: The Movie	Jerry Lopez Sineneng	Star Cinema	

=== 2000s ===
Year	Title	Director(s)	Studio(s)	Notes
2000	Anak	Rory B. Quintos	Star Cinema	
2000	Biyaheng Langit	Tikoy Aguiluz	Viva Films	with Arnel Sevilla
2000	Kahit Isang Saglit	Gilbert Perez	Star Cinema	
2000	Laro sa Baga	Chito S. Roño	Regal Entertainment	
2000	Abandonada	Joel C. Lamangan	Viva Films	
2000	Spirit Warriors	Chito S. Roño	MAQ Productions; Roadrunner Network	
2001	Balahibong Pusa	Yam Laranas	Viva Films	
2001	Mila	Joel Lamangan	Star Cinema	
2001	Hubog	Joel C. Lamangan	Good Harvest Productions	
2002	Kung Ikaw Ay Isang Panaginip	Wenn V. Deramas	Star Cinema	
2002	Got 2 Believe	Olivia M. Lamasan	Star Cinema	
2002	Magkapatid	Joel C. Lamangan	Viva Films	
2002	Forevermore	John D. Lazatin	Star Cinema	
2002	Kailangan Kita	Rory B. Quintos	Star Cinema	
2003	Spirit Warriors: The Shortcut	Chito S. Roño	MAQ Productions; Roadrunner Network	
2003	Ngayong Nandito Ka	Jerry Lopez Sineneng	Star Cinema	
2003	Ang Tanging Ina	Wenn V. Deramas	Star Cinema	
2003	My First Romance	John D. Lazatin; Don Cuaresma	Star Cinema	
2004	Otso-Otso Pamela-Mela-Wan	Jerry Lopez Sineneng	Star Cinema	
2004	Volta	Wenn V. Deramas	Star Cinema	
2005	Nasaan Ka Man	Cholo Laurel	Star Cinema; Cinemedia	
2005	Sarong Banggi	Emmanuel A. Dela Cruz	ufo Pictures	
2005	Dubai	Rory B. Quintos	Star Cinema	
2006	D' Lucky Ones!	Wenn V. Deramas	Star Cinema	
2006	All About Love	Bb. Joyce Bernal; Don Cuaresma; Jerry Lopez Sineneng	Star Cinema	
2006	Kapag Tumibok ang Puso: Not Once, But Twice	Wenn V. Deramas	Imus Productions; GMA Films	
2006	Pacquiao: The Movie	Joel C. Lamangan	Star Cinema; FLT Films	
2007	One More Chance	Cathy Garcia-Molina	Star Cinema	
2008	My Big Love	Jade Castro	Star Cinema	
2008	Supahpapalicious	Gilbert Perez	Star Cinema	with Vince de Jesus
2008	Ploning	Dante Nico Garcia	Panoramanila Pictures; GMA Films	
2008	A Very Special Love	Cathy Garcia-Molina	Star Cinema; Viva Films	
2008	For the First Time	Bb. Joyce Bernal	Star Cinema	
2008	My Only Ü	Cathy Garcia-Molina	Star Cinema	
2008	Dayo: Sa Mundo ng Elementalia	Robert Quilao	Cutting Edge Productions	Animated film Also producer International title: Niko: The Journey to Magika
2008	Ang Tanging Ina N'yong Lahat	Wenn V. Deramas	Star Cinema	
2009	You Changed My Life	Cathy Garcia-Molina	Star Cinema; Viva Films	
2009	BFF: Best Friends Forever	Wenn V. Deramas	Star Cinema	
2009	Agaton ang Mindy	Peque Gallaga	APT Entertainment	with Emerzon Texon
2009	A Journey Home	Paul Soriano	JEC Youth for Christ Production	
2009	Ang Tanging Pamilya (A Marry-Go-Round!)	Wenn V. Deramas	Star Cinema	
2009	Ang Darling Kong Aswang	Tony Y. Reyes	OctoArts Films; APT Entertainment; M-Zet TV Productions	

=== 2010s ===
Year	Title	Director(s)	Studio(s)	Notes
2010	Miss You Like Crazy	Cathy Garcia-Molina	Star Cinema	
2010	The Red Shoes	Raul Jorolan	Unitel Pictures	
2010	Babe, I Love You	Mae Cruz-Alviar	Star Cinema; Viva Films	
2010	I Do	Veronica B. Velasco	Star Cinema	
2010	'Di Natatapos ang Gabi	Ato Bautista	Imaginative Media; FDL Entertainment	
2010	Si Agimat at si Enteng Kabisote	Tony Y. Reyes	OctoArts Films; APT Entertainment; M-Zet TV Productions; Imus Productions; GMA Films	
2010	Ang Tanging Ina Mo: Last Na 'To!	Wenn V. Deramas	Star Cinema	
2011	Pak! Pak! My Dr. Kwak!	Tony Y. Reyes	Star Cinema; M-Zet TV Productions; APT Entertainment; OctoArts Films	
2011	Way Back Home	Jerry Lopez Sineneng	Star Cinema	
2011	Enteng ng Ina Mo	Tony Y. Reyes	Star Cinema; OctoArts Films; APT Entertainment; M-Zet TV Productions	
2011	Manila Kingpin: The Asiong Salonga Story	Tikoy Aguiluz; Gary dela Cruz (uncredited)	Scenema Concept International; Viva Films; CMB Film Services	
2012	Hitman	Cesar Montano	Viva Films; CM Films	
2012	Moron 5 and the Crying Lady	Wenn V. Deramas	Viva Films; MVP Pictures	
2012	The Mistress	Olivia Lamasan	Star Cinema	with Von de Guzman
2012	24/7 in Love	John D. Lazatin; Mae Czarina Cruz-Alviar; Frasco Santos Mortiz; Dado C. Lumibao	Star Cinema	
2012	El Presidente	Mark Meily	Scenema Concept International; CMB Films; Viva Films	
2012	Si Agimat, si Enteng Kabisote at si Ako	Tony Y. Reyes	OctoArts Films; APT Entertainment; M-Zet TV Productions; Imus Productions; GMA Films	
2013	A Moment in Time	Emmanuel Quindo Palo	Star Cinema	
2013	Must Be... Love	Dado Lumibao	Star Cinema	
2013	It Takes a Man and a Woman	Cathy Garcia-Molina	Star Cinema; Viva Films	
2013	My Little Bossings	Marlon N. Rivera	OctoArts Films; APT Entertainment; M-Zet TV Productions; K Productions; GMA Films	
2014	Maybe This Time	Jerry Lopez Sineneng	Star Cinema; Viva Films	
2014	My Illegal Wife	Tony Y. Reyes	Star Cinema; Skylight Films	
2014	Once a Princess	Laurice Guillen	Star Cinema; Regal Entertainment; Skylight Films	
2014	Muslim Magnum .357: To Serve and Protect	Francis 'Jun' Posadas	Scenema Concept International; Viva Films	
2014	My Big Bossing	Tony Y. Reyes	OctoArts Films; APT Entertainment; M-Zet TV Productions; GMA Films	segment "Sirena"
2015	Binhi, the Seed	Pedring Lopez	Haunted Tower Pictures; Viva Communications; BlackOps; WeLovePost; MFT Group	
2015	Must Date the Playboy	Mae Cruz-Alviar	StarFlix	Serialized in iWant TV
2015	Everyday I Love You	Mae Cruz-Alviar	Star Cinema	
2015	Nilalang	Pedring Lopez	Viva Films; BlackOps; Parallax Studio; Haunted Tower Pictures	International title: Entity
2016	Whistleblower	Adolfo Alix Jr.	Unitel Productions; Quento Media	
2016	Just the 3 of Us	Cathy Garcia-Molina	Star Cinema	
2016	Yakap	Danny Añonuevo	The Center for Possibilities Foundation	Documentary film
2016	The Third Party	Jason Paul Laxamana	Star Cinema	
2016	The Escort	Enzo Williams	Regal Entertainment	
2016	Vince & Kath & James	Theodore Boborol	Star Cinema	
2017	My Ex and Whys	Cathy Garcia-Molina	Star Cinema	
2017	Can't Help Falling in Love	Mae Cruz-Alviar	Star Cinema	
2017	Finally Found Someone	Theodore Boborol	Star Cinema	
2017	Seven Sundays	Cathy Garcia-Molina	Star Cinema	
2017	Unexpectedly Yours	Cathy Garcia-Molina	Star Cinema	
2018	Ang Pambansang Third Wheel	Ivan Andrew Payawal	Viva Films; The IdeaFirst Company	
2018	My Perfect You	Cathy Garcia-Molina	Star Cinema	
2018	Da One That Ghost Away	Tony Y. Reyes	Star Cinema	
2018	I Love You, Hater	Giselle Andres	Star Cinema	
2018	The Hows of Us	Cathy Garcia-Molina	Star Cinema	
2018	Through Night and Day	Veronica Velasco	Mavx Productions; Viva Films; OctoArts Films; Mischief Productions	
2018	Three Words to Forever	Cathy Garcia-Molina	Star Cinema	
2018	Jack Em Popoy: The Puliscredibles	Mike Tuviera	APT Entertainment; CCM Film Productions; M-Zet TV Productions	
2019	Boy Tokwa: Lodi ng Gapo	Tony Y. Reyes	VST Production Specialists	
2019	The Gift	Onat Diaz	Dreamscape Digital	Direct-to-streaming film
2019	Maria	Pedring A. Lopez	Viva Films; BlackOps Studios Asia	
2019	Hello, Love, Goodbye	Cathy Garcia-Molina	Star Cinema	
2019	Nuuk	Veronica Velasco	Mavx Productions; Viva Films; OctoArts Films	
2019	3pol Trobol: Huli Ka Balbon!	Rodel Nacianceno	CCM Film Productions	

=== 2020s ===
Year	Title	Director(s)	Studio(s)	Notes
2020	Jolly Spirit Squad	Eduardo Reyes Jr. Chiqui Lacsamana	BMW8 Entertainment	
2020	The Missing	Easy Ferrer	Regal Entertainment	
2021	A Faraway Land	Veronica Velasco	Mavx Productions	
2022	Connected	Theodore Boborol	Star Magic Studios; CineXpress	
2022	The Entitled	Theodore Boborol	TinCan Productions	
2022	Doll House	Marla Ancheta	Mavx Productions	
2022	Labyu with an Accent	Malu Sevilla; Rodel Nacianceno	Star Cinema; CCM Creatives	
2022	Partners in Crime	Cathy Garcia-Molina	Star Cinema; Viva Films	
2023	Single Bells	Fifth Solomon	TinCan Productions; Black Cap Pictures; GMA Pictures	
2023	When I Met You in Tokyo	Rado Peru; Rommel Penesa	JG Productions; Rafaella Films International	
2024	Pagpag 24/7	JR Reyes	Mavx Productions; Viva Films	
2024	A Journey	RC Delos Reyes	Filmotion Productions; Mavx Productions	
2024	Hello, Love, Again	Cathy Garcia-Sampana	Star Cinema; GMA Pictures	
2024	The Kingdom	Michael Tuviera	MQuest Ventures; APT Entertainment; M-Zet TV Productions	
