= Habang May Buhay (album) =

Studio album by Donna Cruz
- Released: 1995
- Genre: Pop, OPM
- Language: English, Tagalog
- Label: Viva Records
- Producer: Vic del Rosario, Jr.

Donna Cruz chronology
Langit Na Naman (1994)	Habang May Buhay (1995)	Merry Christmas Donna (1996)

Singles from Habang May Buhay
- 1. "Only Me and You" Released: 1995; 2. "Habang May Buhay" Released: 1996; 3. "Tayo Lang Dalawa" Released: 1996

Habang May Buhay is the fourth studio album by Filipino singer Donna Cruz, released in the Philippines in 1995 by Viva Records. The album is known for being the fastest-selling OPM album in the nineties, earning a certification of four-times platinum six months after its release. Habang May Buhay was digitally released by Viva Records on iTunes in January 2002.

== Background ==
In 1994, Cruz concentrated on acting, appearing in lead roles in films like Campus Girls, Kadenang Bulaklak, Love Notes: The Movie and Pangako ng Kahapon. After successfully transitioning as a lead actress, VIVA Entertainment Group decided to cast Cruz as Lynette in Villa Quintana which was VIVA's first soap opera. Cruz sang the soap opera's ending theme song entitled "Only Me and You", penned by Vehnee Saturno.

Since Cruz did not have enough time to record songs, she performed the themes from her own movies like "Kadenang Bulaklak" and "Pangako ng Kahapon". After Image lead vocalist Wency Cornejo, who was a huge fan of Cruz, allowed her to record a cover of "Habang May Buhay", which was released as the second single. The song became the title for Cruz's 1996 hit movie of the same name. "Tayo Lang Dalawa" was chosen as the album's third single in 1996, but promotion was halted after Cruz released the single "Wish" with American recording artist Jason Everly later that year.

== Track listing ==
No.	Title	Length
1.	"Habang May Buhay (Acoustic)"	4:42
2.	"Pakiusap"	4:03
3.	"Only Me and You"	5:07
4.	"Nagkabungguan, Nagkatinginan"	4:04
5.	"Tayo Lang Dalawa"	4:02
6.	"Mukha ng Buhay"	4:23
7.	"Kadenang Bulaklak"	4:42
8.	"Pangako ng Kahapon"	4:30
9.	"Habang May Buhay"	4:47
10.	"Ikaw Lang at Ako (bonus track)"	5:07

== Awards ==
"Only Me and You" became the lead single of the album, after receiving heavy rotation as the ending theme of Villa Quintana. The song won the awards for Best Ballad Recording and Best Vocal Performance by a Female Artist in the 1995 Awit Awards. It became Cruz' most successful radio single in the Philippines, enlisted to be played once every hour in more than seven Philippine-based radio stations throughout the summer of 1995. Cruz re-recorded the song in Tagalog, which was called "Ikaw Lang at Ako". "Ikaw Lang at Ako" was eventually included in the re-release of Habang May Buhay in 1996.
