= 1995 Metro Manila Film Festival =

Film festival edition

- Date: December 25, 1995 to January 3, 1996
- Site: Manila

Highlights
- Best Picture: Muling Umawit ang Puso
- Most awards: Muling Umawit ang Puso (11)

The 21st Metro Manila Film Festival was held in 1995.

Viva Films' Muling Umawit ang Puso romped away with eleven awards including the Best Picture, Best Actress for multi-awarded Nora Aunor, Best Director for Joel Lamangan, and the Gatpuno Antonio J. Villegas Cultural Awards among others. In addition, first-time awardee Richard Gomez went home with the Best Actor Award for the movie Dahas.

== Entries ==
Title	Starring	Studio	Director	Genre
Dahas	Maricel Soriano, Richard Gomez, Tonton Gutierrez, Efren Reyes, Jr., Sheila Ysrael, Maila Gumila	MAQ Productions	Chito Roño	Crime, Drama, Thriller
Father en Son	Dolphy, Vandolph, Zsa Zsa Padilla, Babalu, Carmi Martin, Panchito, Judy Ann Santos, Manny Boy Q., Jeffrey Quizon, Bernardo Bernardo, Freddie Quizon	RVQ Productions	Rodolfo V. Quizon	Comedy, Drama, Family
Huwag Mong Isuko ang Laban	Ronnie Ricketts, Vina Morales, Miguel Rodriguez, Ricardo Cepeda, Janine Barredo, Charina Scott, Melissa Mendez, Edgar Mande	Rockets Productions, Inc.	Ronnie Ricketts	Action
Isko: Adventures in Animasia	Ogie Alcasid, Michelle van Eimeren, Michael V., Candy Pangilinan, Palito	OctoArts Films	Mike Relon Makiling and Geirry Garccia	Animation, Adventure, Comedy
Magic Kombat	Smokey Manaloto, Eric Fructuoso, Beth Tamayo, Sharmaine Suarez, Joanne Pascual	Mahogany Pictures	Junn Cabreira	Fantasy, Action, Adventure
Muling Umawit ang Puso	Nora Aunor, Albert Martinez, Donna Cruz, Ian de Leon, Ricky Davao, Michael de Mesa, Rita Avila, Jennifer Sevilla	VIVA Films	Joel Lamangan	Drama, Musical

== Winners and nominees ==
=== Awards ===
Winners are listed first and highlighted in boldface.

Best Film	Best Director
**Muling Umawit ang Puso - VIVA Films**; Dahas (2nd Best Picture); Huwag Mong Isuko ang Laban (3rd Best Picture)	**Joel Lamangan - Muling Umawit ang Puso**; Chito Roño - Dahas; Rodolfo V. Quizon - Father En Son; Ronnie Ricketts - Huwag Mong Isuko ang Laban; Mike Relon Makiling and Geirry Garccia - Isko: Adventures in Animasia
Best Actor	Best Actress
**Richard Gomez – Dahas**	**Nora Aunor – Muling Umawit ang Puso**; Maricel Soriano - Dahas; Vina Morales - Huwag Mong Isuko ang Laban; Joanne Pascual - Magic Kombat; Beth Tamayo - Magic Kombat; Zsa Zsa Padilla - Father En Son
Best Supporting Actor	Best Supporting Actress
**Albert Martinez – Muling Umawit ang Puso**	**Donna Cruz – Muling Umawit ang Puso**; Melissa Mendez - Huwag Mong Isuko ang Laban; Janine Baredo - Huwag Mong Isuko ang Laban; Jennifer Sevilla - Muling Umawit ang Puso; Cita Astals - Magic Kombat; Sharmaine Suarez - Magic Kombat; Carmi Martin - Father En Son; Candy Pangilinan - Isko: Adventures in Animasia; Aileen Angeles - Isko: Adventures in Animasia; Maila Gumila - Dahas
Best Production Design	Best Cinematography
**Manny Morfe – Muling Umawit ang Puso**	**Charlie Peralta – Dahas**
Best Child Performer	Best Film Editor
**Charina Scott – Huwag Mong Isuko ang Laban**	**Jaime Davila – Dahas**
Best Original Story	Best Screenplay
**Ricky Lee – Muling Umawit ang Puso**	**Ricky Lee – Muling Umawit ang Puso**
Best Original Song	Best Music
**Willy Cruz – Muling Umawit ang Puso**	**Vehnee Saturno – Muling Umawit ang Puso**
Best Visual Effects	Best Make-up
-	-
Best Sound Recording	Best Float
-	**Isko: Adventures in Animasia**

=== Special Categories ===
Winners are listed first and highlighted in boldface.

Gatpuno Antonio J. Villegas Cultural Awards
- **Muling Umawit ang Puso - VIVA Films**

== Multiple awards ==
Awards	Film
11	Muling Umawit ang Puso
3	Dahas

Preceded by 1994 Metro Manila Film Festival	Metro Manila Film Festival; 1995	Succeeded by 1996 Metro Manila Film Festival
