= Ang Tipo Kong Lalake (Maginoo pero Medyo Bastos) =

Philippine comedy film

- Directed by: Efren Jarlego
- Written by: Dwight Gaston
- Produced by: William Leary
- Starring: Joey de Leon; Dennis Padilla
- Cinematography: Oscar Querijero
- Edited by: Edgardo Jarlego
- Music by: Ricky del Rosario
- Production company: Viva Films
- Distributed by: Viva Films
- Release date: August 16, 1995
- Running time: 102 minutes
- Country: Philippines
- Language: Filipino

Ang Tipo Kong Lalake (Maginoo pero Medyo Bastos) (lit. 'My Type of Guy (Gentlemanly but A Little Rude)') is a 1995 Filipino comedy film directed by Efren Jarlego. The film stars Joey de Leon and Dennis Padilla. It is named after DJ Alvaro's hit song of the same name.

The film is streaming online on YouTube.

== Plot ==
Boy and Junior are professional robbers who were unfortunately captured and sent to the penitentiary to serve their sentence. While in jail, they were initially terrorized by the prison mayor, Totoy Aguila but eventually got his respect and feared for his safety after they made fun of his eagle tattoo and the duo causing havoc inside the prison. After serving 10 years in jail, Boy and Junior wanted to stay at their uncle's house only to find out it was converted to a ladies' dormitory managed by Demi and Tracy. They agreed to work at the dormitory but everytime Demi and Tracy and other girls ask about their backgrounds, they would make up lies to avoid being driven out of the house for being ex-convicts.

Unfortunately Boy and Junior's past caught up with them when they had an encounter with an old associate Tequila who now works for a big-time crime lord named Minggoy and convinced them to go back to robbing houses. Boy and Junior declined as they had declared they are now on a straight path, having paid the price for committing a crime. But Tequila kept persisting until he paid a visit to the ladies' dormitory where he found Boy and Junior working there and exposed them to Demi and Tracy and the girls who have put their complete trust on the duo after helping them out on various occasions. As a result Boy and Junior were driven out of the house only to come back and realized the girls were in danger. Tequila and Minggoy instructed the duo to rob the specific house which they had visited during a party, which they did. After they robbed the house of the jewelleries and some cash, they went to the hideout where they eventually outwitted Tequila and Minggoy and their bodyguards and saved the girls.

Due to the injuries they sustained in saving the girls, Boy and Junior were brought to the hospital and were rewarded with a check by the police chief for doing the right thing in calling him first before saving the girls. Just after the police chief left, Totoy Aguila appeared with Boy and Junior's rival gang ready to exact revenge on them. But after seeing the duo in a bad state, Totoy Aguila instead confronts his gang members due to the embarrassment he was led to and beats them up in front of everyone.

== Cast ==
- Joey de Leon as Boy
- Dennis Padilla as Junior
- Rita Avila as Demi
- Michelle Aldana as Tracy
- Paquito Diaz as Kits
- Cheska Diaz as Nicole
- Glydel Mercado as Del
- Michelle Parton as Michelle
- Rufa Mae Quinto as Rufa
- Jessa Zaragoza as Jessa
- Phillip Lazaro as Philip
- Lorelei Dividina as Lorry
- Tony Carreon as Minggoy
- Daniel Fernando as Tequila
- Errol Dionisio as James
- Teroy De Guzman Jr. as Bond
- Jon Achaval as Chief Detective
- Jordan Castillo as Edwin
- Beverly Salviejo as Lovely
- Val Sotto as Totoy Aguila
- Danny Punzalan as Bilibid Warden
- Felipe Tauro as Waiter Referee
- Tony Bagyo as Restaurant Customer
- Rudy Vicdel as Restaurant Customer
- Don Pepot as Chasing Policeman
- Nonong de Andres as Beggar
- Samantha Lopez as Gracia
- Bella Flores as Dancing Partner
