= Kurot sa Puso =

Studio album by Donna
- Released: 1993
- Genre: Pop, OPM
- Language: English, Tagalog
- Label: Viva Records
- Producer: Vic del Rosario, Jr.

Donna chronology
Donna (1991)	Kurot sa Puso (1993)	Langit Na Naman (1994)

Singles from Kurot Sa Puso
- 1. "Tampuririt" Released: February 14, 1993; 2. "Kurot sa Puso" Released: 1993

Kurot sa Puso is the second studio album by Filipino singer Donna Cruz (then using the mononym Donna), released in the Philippines in 1993 by Viva Records. It was originally released on compact disc and cassette tape and is the last album by Cruz to be released on vinyl. The album was digitally released by Viva Records on iTunes in April 2006.

== Background ==
Following the success of her debut album Donna, Cruz returned to recording a studio album in 1990. According to Vic del Rosario, Jr., head of VIVA Entertainment Group, the success of the single "Kapag Tumibok ang Puso" put so much pressure on Cruz that they decided to take time in recording her next album. The song "Kurot sa Puso" did not perform as well as Cruz' previous hits like "Rain" or "Kapag Tumibok ang Puso" but the album was certified gold nonetheless. No further singles were released soon after as Cruz began her involvement in more television acting projects like as Alabang Girls and Ober Da Bakod.

== Track listing ==
No.	Title	Length
1.	"Huwag Kang Mangako"	3:13
2.	"Kurot sa Puso"	4:00
3.	"Tampuririt"	4:20
4.	"Alam Mo Na, Di Ba?"	3:28
5.	"Usapan"	7:00
6.	"Kapag Kasama Ka"	3:53
7.	"Kahit Dama ng Puso"	3:50
8.	"Pag-ibig Na Ba Ito?"	3:45
9.	"Walang Balikan, Walang Palitan"	4:09
10.	"Mayroon Na Bang Ibang Gusto"	4:48
