= Hulog ng Langit =

Hulog Ng Langit

Studio album by Donna Cruz
- Released: September 1999
- Genres: Pop; OPM
- Languages: English; Tagalog
- Label: Viva Records
- Producers: Vic del Rosario, Jr.

Donna Cruz chronology
The Best of Donna (1998)	Hulog Ng Langit (1999)	Donna Cruz Sings Her Greatest Hits (2001)

Singles from Hulog Ng Langit
- 1. "Hulog Ng Langit" Released: 1999; 2. "Ikaw Pala 'Yon" Released: 2000

Professional ratings
Review scores
Source	Rating
AllMusic	2/5 stars

Hulog Ng Langit is the seventh studio album by Filipino singer Donna Cruz, released in the Philippines in September 1999 by Viva Records. It was released as Cruz's final album under her contract with Viva Entertainment. Cruz did not record another album until Now and Forever in 2016.

== Background and promotion ==
After her marriage in 1998, Cruz began recording new material for her upcoming album. Having unfulfilled her duties under her then-current recording contract with Viva Entertainment Group, Cruz was obliged to finish her contract by recording a studio album. In 1999, Cruz handpicked longtime collaborator and producer Vehnee Saturno to write "Hulog Ng Langit" which was chosen as the lead single. As she was pregnant with her first child back then, Cruz also recorded several cover songs she wanted to be part of the album which included "Someone's Waiting for You" from The Rescuers, John Denver's "For Baby," Dusty Springfield's "I Only Want to Be with You", Petula Clark's "You and I" and "I Have Dreamed" which was originally performed by Julie Andrews.

Cruz embarked on a promotional tour for the album in 2000 after she gave birth to her daughter. Two singles were released from the album, the Vehnee Saturno-penned title track, and "Ikaw Pala 'Yon" which was released in early 2000, shortly after Cruz gave birth. The album was eventually certified platinum in May 2000.

== Track listing ==
No.	Title	Writer(s)	Length
1.	"For Baby"	John Denver	4:14
2.	"Ikaw Pala 'Yon"	Edith Gallardo, Moy Ortiz	4:56
3.	"Hulog Ng Langit"	Vehnee Saturno	4:02
4.	"Everlasting Love"	Luigi De Dios, Rina Caniza, Moy Ortiz	4:43
5.	"All of My Life"	Michael Randall	3:30
6.	"You and I (duet with Janno Gibbs)"	Leslie Bricusse	5:08
7.	"I Only Want to Be with You"	Michael Hawker	4:28
8.	"Sino Ba?"	Vehnee Saturno	3:55
9.	"Narito ang Puso Ko"	Sy, Alvina	3:48
10.	"Ever Since"	Ringgo Marquez	4:04
11.	"I Have Dreamed"	Oscar Hammerstein II, Richard Rodgers	4:39
12.	"Someone's Waiting for You"	Carol Connors, Sammy Fain, Ayn Robbins	3:40
13.	"The Story of My Life"	Alan Menken, David Zippel	4:48
