= The Best of Donna =

Compilation album by Donna Cruz
- Released: 1998
- Genre: Pop, OPM
- Language: English, Tagalog
- Label: Viva Records
- Producer: Vic del Rosario, Jr.

Donna Cruz chronology
Pure Donna (1997)	The Best of Donna (1998)	Hulog Ng Langit (1999)

The Best of Donna is the first compilation album by Filipino singer Donna Cruz, released in the Philippines in 1998 by Viva Records. The album included majority of Cruz's hit singles, as well as "Muling Umawit ang Puso", the theme song from her movie with veteran actress Nora Aunor. Several hit songs including "Boy (I Love You)", "Kurot sa Puso", "Langit Na Naman" and "Habang May Buhay" were notably absent from the album for reasons unknown.

The album is the first offering of our Viva Collection Forever compilation in 1998, followed by The Best of Love Duets.

== Background and promotion ==
In early 1998, Cruz became engaged to ophthalmologist Potenciano Larrazabal III. At this time, Cruz announced that she would be taking a career hiatus to start a family. Several projects lined up such as recording a new studio album and rehearsals for her first major concert in the Araneta Coliseum to promote Pure Donna were all halted.

In an interview with Startalk, Cruz announced that Isang Tanong, Isang Sagot would be her last film under her then-current contract under the VIVA Entertainment Group as she wanted to focus on preparing for her wedding which was to be held on September 19, 1998. She as well as the VIVA Entertainment Group head Vic del Rosario, Jr. rejected the script tailor-made for Cruz entitled Putikang Anghel which will depict the former in a more controversial, racy and daring role. The film was shelved permanently. Cruz's final project before her marriage in September of that same year was in Growing Up in which she voluntarily decided to play a supporting role to actress Angelu de Leon instead of starring co-lead. Cruz eventually dropped out of the show months prior to getting married.

The Best of Donna did not receive any heavy promotion from Cruz and VIVA Entertainment Group. The album used photos of Cruz from her previous pictorials, majority coming from the Habang May Buhay sessions. No newly recorded material was included in the compilation album.

== Track listing ==
No.	Title	Length
1.	"Hang On"	4:24
2.	"Isang Tanong, Isang Sagot"	4:27
3.	"I Will Be Here to Stay"	4:08
4.	"Kadenang Bulaklak"	4:42
5.	"Only Me and You"	5:06
6.	"Rain"	3:25
7.	"Ikaw Lang ang Mahal"	3:46
8.	"Smile"	4:04
9.	"Muling Umawit ang Puso"	5:38
10.	"I Can"	4:00
11.	"Wish"	4:00
12.	"Kapag Tumibok ang Puso"	4:00
