= Dahas (film) =

1995 psychological thriller film by Chito S. Roño

- Directed by: Chito S. Roño
- Written by: Roy Iglesias
- Produced by: Sherida Monteverde; Douglas Quijano
- Starring: Maricel Soriano; Richard Gomez; Tonton Gutierrez
- Cinematography: Charlie S. Peralta
- Edited by: Jaime B. Davila
- Music by: Jessie Lasaten
- Production company: MAQ Productions
- Distributed by: Regal Films
- Release date: 25 December 1995
- Running time: 101 minutes
- Country: Philippines
- Language: Filipino

Dahas (English: Violence) is a 1995 Philippine psychological crime thriller film directed by Chito S. Roño from a story and screenplay written by Roy Iglesias. The film stars Maricel Soriano, Richard Gomez, and Tonton Gutierrez in a tale of domestic violence and marital rape, where a battered woman who was raped by an unknown man before her wedding.

Produced by MAQ Productions and distributed by Regal Films, the film was released theatrically on 25 December 1995, as one of the entries to the 21st Metro Manila Film Festival. It was later screened in Japan on 15 September 1996, as one of the Philippine films exhibited at the 6th Fukuoka International Film Festival.

== Plot ==
Luisa and Jake are soon to be married. However, days before their wedding, Luisa, who was taking shelter at a shed on a rainy day, was assaulted and raped by an unknown man, causing her to be traumatized.

== Cast ==
- Maricel Soriano as Luisa Bonoan: A library employee who was both raped and battered.
- Richard Gomez as Jake Bonoan: A mechanic who beats his wife.
- Tonton Gutierrez as Eric Sacdalan: A rogue cop who raped Luisa before the wedding.
- Efren Reyes Jr. as Bing
- Sheila Ysrael as Maggie
- Maila Gumila as Minnie
- Marita Zobel as Aling Gracia Bonoan: Jake's mother
- Rez Cortez as Capt. Jugo
- Ray Ventura as NBI Chief
- Anthony Taylor as Farrah
- Gamaliel Viray as Gov. Palabrico
- Nonie Buencamino as NBI Agent
- Mon Confiado as The Thief
- Gio Santos as Manny
- Felindo Obach as Orchard Caretaker

== Reception ==
=== Critical response ===
Jullie Yap Daza, a columnist writing for Manila Standard, gave a positive review, with praise towards Roño's direction in making the story violent while tackling rape and domestic violence, Iglesias' written efforts, and the performances of the cast.

=== Accolades ===
Award-giving organization	Date of ceremony	Category	Recipient(s)	Result	Ref.
21st Metro Manila Film Festival	27 December 1995	Best Picture	Dahas	2nd	
21st Metro Manila Film Festival	27 December 1995	Best Director	Chito S. Roño	Nominated	
21st Metro Manila Film Festival	27 December 1995	Best Actor	Richard Gomez	Won	
21st Metro Manila Film Festival	27 December 1995	Best Actress	Maricel Soriano	Nominated	
21st Metro Manila Film Festival	27 December 1995	Best Supporting Actress	Maila Gumila	Nominated	
21st Metro Manila Film Festival	27 December 1995	Best Cinematography	Charlie Peralta	Won	
21st Metro Manila Film Festival	27 December 1995	Best Editing	Jaime Davila	Won	
