= Adarna: The Mythical Bird =

1997 Filipino animated film

- MMFF release poster
- Directed by: Geirry Garccia
- Written by: Geirry Garccia
- Story by: Geirry Garccia
- Based on: Ibong Adarna
- Produced by: Simon C.P. Lam; Elma Garcia; Rose L. Flaminiano
- Starring: Marvin Agustin; Jolina Magdangal; Izza Ignacio; Renzo Cruz; Martin Nievera; Regine Velasquez
- Music by: Jessie Lasaten
- Production companies: Guiding Light Productions; FLT Films International
- Distributed by: Viva Films
- Release date: December 25, 1997
- Country: Philippines
- Languages: Filipino; English
- Box office: ₱11.2 million

Adarna: The Mythical Bird is a 1997 Philippine animated musical fantasy film directed by animator Geraldo A. Garccia (credited as Geirry Garccia). Based on the 19th century corrido commonly titled Ibong Adarna (lit. 'Adarna Bird'), it is the first full-length theatrical animated film produced in the Philippines.

The film was released on December 25, 1997, as part of the Metro Manila Film Festival, where it won a special achievement award for its pioneering achievement in Philippine animation. Although some critics were critical of the film's poor animation, it earned a box office worth ₱11.2 million, but did not make it to its production cost.

In later years, the film fell into obscurity, with film producer Tony Tuviera accidentally claiming his own animated film Urduja to be the country's first in 2008.

== Cast ==
- Jolina Magdangal as Princess Carmina
  - Regine Velasquez provides Princess Carmina's singing voice
- Marvin Agustin as Ramir
  - Martin Nievera provides Ramir's singing voice
- Izza Ignacio as Elmira
- Renzo Cruz as Gustavo
- Boots Anson-Roa as the narrator/Ibong Adarna

== Production ==
Animator Geirry A. Garccia was living in the United States when he was convinced of the idea to create an animated film based on the Ibong Adarna corrido. He returned to the Philippines with medical physicist Simon C. P. Lam of New Jersey to establish Guiding Light Productions and begin producing the film. Lav Diaz contributes as a co-writer to the film.

Post-production of Adarna: The Mythical Bird was done in the United States, as was done with Garccia's previous film, the live-action/animated hybrid Isko: Adventures in Animasia (1995). One key sponsor of Adarna that enabled the production to be financed was Mister Donut. The animation took two years to finish, with producer Rose L. Flaminiano, head of FLT Films International, later bought the rights to the film's release when it was nearing completion, with a new nine-minute segment soon added to the film that had the additional cost of $50,000.

=== Music ===
In mid-1997, months prior to the film's release, PolyCosmic Records (now UMG Philippines) released the soundtrack album Songs from Adarna: The Mythical Bird, which featured songs performed for the film by Regine Velasquez, Martin Nievera, and The Youth.

== Release ==
Adarna was declared an entry to the 1997 Metro Manila Film Festival (MMFF) on December 3, 1997, with a release date of December 25. The sole award that the film received from the festival was a special citation for being the "first ever animated movie in Philippine cinema" (Filipino: Kauna-unahang animated Movie sa Philippine Cinema). It earned a successful box office worth ₱11.2 million, but did not make it to its production cost.

=== Reception ===
In assessing each of the MMFF entries, Isah V. Red of the Manila Standard gave the film his lowest rating ("a TV set", which means "very bad, go and watch TV, instead"), expressing disappointment in its screenplay and lack of "dynamism" when compared with the animated films produced by Disney. He stated that "[f]or a first effort in full-length animated feature, Garccia should be commended. But it shouldn't give him the false notion that he had done something as pretty as the Lion King or Little Mermaid."

== Legacy ==
In October 2006, United Animation Inc. and United Staffing Registry Inc. organized the 1st Filipino Animation Awards, where Geirry Garccia was awarded for his pioneering contributions to Philippine animation, which included Adarna: The Mythical Bird; others were awarded more specifically for their involvement in the film's production: Ramon Chuaying, Simon C.P. Lam, Levi Celerio and Lav Diaz.

As late as 2008, the film was publicly exhibited at the Animahenasyon festival.

== See also ==
- Nonoy Marcelo, the animator who directed the Philippine's first full-length animated film Tadhana in 1978
