= Attagirl (TV series) =

- Genre: Sitcom
- Created by: ABS-CBN
- Written by: Jose Javier Reyes
- Directed by: John D. Lazatin
- Starring: Vanessa Del Bianco; Andrea del Rosario; Desiree del Valle; Michelle Bayle; Jessa Zaragoza
- Opening theme: "Attagirl"
- Country of origin: Philippines
- Original language: Filipino
- No. of episodes: n/a

Production
- Executive producer: Rowena Feliciano

Original release
- Network: ABS-CBN
- Release: September 13, 2001 – May 7, 2002

Related
- Whattamen

Attagirl is a Philippine television sitcom series broadcast by ABS-CBN. Directed by John D. Lazatin, it stars Vanessa Del Bianco, Andrea Del Rosario, Desiree del Valle, Michelle Bayle and Jessa Zaragoza. It aired from September 13, 2001, to May 7, 2002, replacing the Thursday slot of Home Along Da Riles and was replaced by OK Fine, 'To ang Gusto Nyo!.

This is also the second time Jose Javier Reyes collaborated with Jessa Zaragoza; this is also the reunion project of Andrea del Rosario and Vanessa del Bianco who worked with each other in the movie Hiling.

== Synopsis ==
After the success of Whattamen, Attagirl is the second series of Jose Javier Reyes. In this comedy sitcom series, it follows on 4 different women and their relationships: Amanda, (Jessa Zaragoza) the serious one, Maxi (Vanessa Del Blanco) and Geri (Michelle Bayle) are cousins who live with their Lolo, and Jhoanne Mae (Andrea del Rosario), a sexy house boarder. Will they get their chance and luck at love and life as they navigate the hot city of Manila with all the craziness in the 2000s?

== Cast ==
- Vanessa Del Bianco as Maxi
- Andrea Del Rosario as Joey
- Desiree del Valle as Charly
- Jessa Zaragoza as Mandy
- Michelle Bayle as Geri

== See also ==
- List of programs broadcast by ABS-CBN
