= Pag-ibig Ko Sayo'y Totoo =

Philippine romantic action film

- Official movie poster
- Directed by: Romy Suzara
- Screenplay by: Felix Dalay; Jojo Lapus; Romy Suzara
- Story by: Felix Dalay; Jojo Lapus
- Produced by: Jose Mari M. Bautista
- Starring: Donna Cruz; Bong Revilla
- Cinematography: Danny Bustos
- Edited by: Renato de Leon
- Music by: Jaime Fabregas
- Production companies: Mahogany Pictures; Viva Films
- Distributed by: Viva Films
- Release date: June 27, 1996
- Running time: 115 minutes
- Country: Philippines
- Language: Filipino

Pag-ibig Ko Sayo'y Totoo is a 1996 Philippine romantic action film directed by Romy Suzara. The film stars Bong Revilla and Donna Cruz. It is named after Blue Jeans' hit song Paniwalaan Mo.

The film is streaming online on YouTube.

== Synopsis ==
Despite grieving for the death of his fiancee, Lt. Mario Romero, a law enforcer has accepted his assignment of protecting Dulce, daughter of a businessman who is targeted by rival enemies.

== Cast ==
- Bong Revilla as Lt. Mario Romero
- Nanette Medved as Beth
- Donna Cruz as Dulce
- Paquito Diaz as Mr. Diaz
- Tirso Cruz III as Manny Diaz
- E. R. Ejercito as Jett Diaz
- Ernie Zarate as Cmdre. Manalo
- Ramil Rodriguez as Mr. Lopez
- Mia Gutierrez as Mrs. Lopez
- Dexter Doria as Beth's Mother
- Idda Yaneza as Yaya Charing
- Val Iglesias as Ilagan
- Edwin Reyes as Rodrigo
- Atoy Co as Cortez
- Erick Torrente as Torrente
- Berting Labra as Tata Berting

== Production ==
Ikaw Lang at Ako, the Tagalog version of Only Me and You, was later on included in Donna Cruz's 1996 album Habang May Buhay as a bonus track. Both versions of the song were used in the film, with the former being a medley with Blue Jeans' Paniwalaan Mo.
