= Do Re Mi (1996 film) =

1996 musical comedy film by Ike Jarlego Jr.

- Theatrical release poster
- Directed by: Ike Jarlego Jr.
- Written by: Mel Mendoza-del Rosario
- Produced by: Eric M. Cuatico
- Starring: Donna Cruz; Regine Velasquez; Mikee Cojuangco
- Cinematography: Ding Austria
- Edited by: Marya Ignacio
- Music by: Margot M. Gallardo
- Production company: Neo Films
- Distributed by: Viva Entertainment
- Release date: November 13, 1996
- Running time: 109 minutes
- Country: Philippines
- Languages: Filipino; English

Do Re Mi is a 1996 Philippine musical comedy film directed by Ike Jarlego Jr. from a screenplay written by Mel Mendoza-del Rosario. The film stars Donna Cruz, Regine Velasquez, and Mikee Cojuangco. The film is considered to be the most successful Filipino musical comedy of all time. The film's title is a play between the solfège and a portmanteau using the first two letters of Donna, Regine, and Mikee's first names.

== Plot ==
The film uses the concept of three female singers who, "as they sing their way through life's ups and downs, they build a friendship strong enough to last a lifetime."

In an attempt to salvage their group's music career, Reggie Mendoza (Regine Velasquez), a self-confessed lola's girl, and Mikki Tolentino (Mikee Cojuangco), a man-hating tomboy and breadwinner of her family, discover Donnette Legaspi (Donna Cruz), a vainglorious, and spoiled rich girl, to be part of their musical trio, DoReMi. Despite their drastic differences in both their personalities and principles, their shared love for music allowed them to consider pursuing a music career in Japan, only to figure out in an interrogation at the local airport that a fly-by-night recruitment agency had falsified their documents and faked their passports. Due to this mishap, the girls travel to an unknown rural province, putting themselves in a self-imposed exile after the embarrassment they faced after chasing their dreams. While still considering the idea of becoming successful in the music industry, the girls help convert a small local restaurant into a mini bar where they can perform to sustain their daily needs and expenses. Their successful stint as vocal performers consistently draw huge crowds, and their popularity in the area attracted several record executives to sign them for a recording contract.

On the day of the group's contract signing, both Donnette and Mikki back out from signing the record deal, leaving a disheartened Reggie as a solo act. As Reggie pursued a career as a successful solo singer, Donnette channeled her efforts to help orphans and other abused children in social welfare, and Mikki, started her own family, and food business with Toto (Gary Estrada), whom she met and fell in love with in the province. In a charitable gala where all three of them unknowingly participate in, the girls are brought together once more as they perform the song they co-wrote together.

== Cast ==
- Donna Cruz as Donnette Legaspi
- Regine Velasquez as Reggie Mendoza
- Mikee Cojuangco as Mikki Tolentino
- Gloria Romero as Reggie's Lola
- Gary Estrada as Toto
- Berting Labra as Mikki's Father
- Evangeline Pascual as Donette's Mother
- Ramil Rodriguez as Donette's Father
- Anthony Cortez as Julio
- Melisse Santiago as Nene
- Lee Robin Salazar as Joey
- Lorli Villanueva as Mikki's Mother
- Ricky Rivero as Boyet
- Gerard Faisan as Victor
- Carlos Ramirez I as Kambal I
- Carlos Ramirez II as Kambal II
- Elaine Kemuel as Dorothy
- Archie Adamos as Nene's Father

Actors Cesar Montano, Ruby Rodriguez and Menchu Macapagal have cameo appearances in the film.

== Planning and production ==
According to a retrospective by ABS-CBN, the film "was originally titled Sana'y Wala Nang Wakas 2," based loosely on the 1986 film starring Sharon Cuneta, Cherie Gil, and Dina Bonnevie.

== Promotion ==
Being hailed as the highly anticipated movie of 1996, there was extreme hype behind the collaboration between the three main actresses. To promote the movie, Cruz, Velasquez and Cojuangco appeared in an episode of T.G.I.S., reprising their roles in the film. The girls also appeared in all three major networks, ABS-CBN, GMA Network and ABC (now 5) for several interviews in various talk and variety shows. For the film and soundtrack's press release, Cruz, Velasquez, and Cojuangco performed the songs in a promotional mini-concert.

Despite being part of the film, Velasquez' vocals were not part of the recording of its soundtrack, as it was a then-upcoming VIVA Records singer named Krystine Marcaida, who sang vocals on her part. In the film version, Velasquez was able to record her vocals just in time before the movie was released.

== Reception ==
The film was released to critical acclaim, with majority of the critics praising the chemistry and comic timing of Cruz, Velasquez and Cojuangco altogether, while still establishing character distinction as individuals. The film became the most successful Filipino musical comedy film of the nineties earning ₱170 million in its one-month theatrical run. The song "I Can", which was the main theme of the movie, also became a number-one hit in the Philippines.

== Soundtrack ==
Do Re Mi: Music from the Motion Picture

Soundtrack album by Various Artists
- Released: 1996
- Genres: Pop; Dance-pop
- Label: Viva Records
- Producers: Vic del Rosario, Jr. Louie J. Ocampo; Margot M. Gallardo

DoReMi: Music from the Motion Picture features songs performed by Donna Cruz, Mikee Cojuangco, Regine Velasquez and girl group Vanna Vanna and was produced by Viva Records. All of the songs were produced by Margot M. Gallardo, with the album's main theme, "I Can," being co-produced by Louie M. Ocampo.

=== Track listing ===
| No. | Title | Writer(s) | Performer(s) | Length |
|---|---|---|---|---|
| 1. | "I Can (Main Theme)" | Louie M. Ocampo, Edith M. Gallardo | Donna Cruz, Regine Velasquez, Mikee Cojuangco | 3:34 |
| 2. | "A Little Love Goes a Long Way" | Moy Ortiz, Gallardo | Cruz, Marcaida, Cojuangco | 3:10 |
| 3. | "Sharing the Same Dreams" | Ortiz, Gallardo | Cruz, Marcaida, Cojuangco | 4:00 |
| 4. | "Akalain Ko Ba" | Babsie Molina, Gallardo | Cojuangco | 3:31 |
| 5. | "Stop! In the Name of Love" | Holland–Dozier–Holland | Vanna Vanna | 3:28 |
| 6. | "I Can (Instrumental)" | Ocampo | | 3:36 |
| 7. | "I've Got the Best in You" | Vehnee Saturno | Cruz | 4:10 |
| 8. | "A Little Love Goes a Long Way (Instrumental)" | Ortiz | | 3:14 |
| 9. | "I Can (Karaoke Scene)" | Ocampo, Gallardo | Cruz, Velasquez, Cojuangco | 2:34 |
| 10. | "Awit Ng Pag-asa (Adapted from "I am But a Small Voice")" | Ivory Records (now as Ivory Music and Video) | Melisse Santiago and Children | 3:34 |
