= Isko: Adventures in Animasia =

- MMFF release poster
- Directed by: Mike Relon Makiling; Geirry A. Garccia
- Written by: Tony Apon; Pol Gutierrez; Mike Relon Makiling; Gene Laurenciano (animation)
- Story by: Geirry A. Garccia
- Starring: Ogie Alcasid; Michelle van Eimeren; Michael V.; Candy Pangilinan
- Cinematography: Ben Lobo
- Edited by: Nonoy Santillan
- Music by: Jessie Lasaten
- Production company: OctoArts Films
- Distributed by: OctoArts Films
- Release date: December 25, 1995
- Running time: 100 minutes
- Country: Philippines
- Language: Filipino

Isko: Adventures sa Animasia (marketed as Isko: Adventures in Animasia) is a 1995 Philippine fantasy comedy film directed by Geirry A. Garccia (in his directorial debut) and Mike Relon Makiling. Combining live-action and animation, the film revolves a coconut dealer named Isko, who must save the princess and the land of Animasia from the evil monsters.

Isko is the first live-action animated hybrid theatrical feature film produced in the Philippines, containing thirty minutes of animation sequences. Produced by OctoArts Films, the film was released on December 25, 1995 as an entry to the 21st Metro Manila Film Festival (MMFF).

== Plot ==
Isko, a meek coconut vendor is being transported into Animasia, a fantasy world in order to save Princess Annaly from the ogre, ghoul and evil monsters who threatens the mystical kingdom and bring back the order and peace in the land.

== Cast ==
- Ogie Alcasid as Isko
- Michelle van Eimeren as Annaly
- Michael V. as Tibo
- Candy Pangilinan as Carol
- Palito as Mang Amado
- Jon Achaval as Don Fausto
- Jan Rivera as Jerly
- Aileen Angeles as the midwife
- Marlon Mance as the nurse
- Domini Primero as Walter
- Archie Adamos as the logger
- Rodney Shatarra
- William Manzano
- Angelo Lacsamana
- Maridin Lamano
- Sarah Polverini
- Jaimee Mallard
- Jerry Gonzales as Dr. Reyes
- Gloria Plamera as Ising
- Emeng Barcelona as the barangay tanod
- Bert Mansueto as the barangay tanod

== Production ==
Animator Geirry A. Garccia was the director of the film while Elmaurie Galvez was among the staff responsible for visual effects. The staff made the traditional cel-animation about few months up to 2 years including the filming for live-action.

== Release ==
External videos
- Isko: Adventures in Animasia hosted on OctoArts Films's official YouTube channel

Isko: Adventures in Animasia premiered in Philippine cinemas on December 25, 1995, as an official entry at the 1995 Metro Manila Film Festival, winning the award for Best Float. It also won two FAMAS Awards for technical achievement in 1997.

The entire film was made available for streaming online on April 22, 2024 on YouTube.

== See also ==
- Adarna: The Mythical Bird (1997), Garccia's succeeding film that became the first full-length theatrical animated film in the Philippines
- Tadhana (1978), the first full-length animated film in the Philippines
