= Bangkay =

Filipino actor (1947–2018)

- Bangkay in December 2016
- Born: José Clemente de Andrés; May 4, 1947; Masbate, Philippines
- Died: November 6, 2018 (aged 71); Plaridel, Quezon, Philippines
- Other names: Nonong Bangkay; Bangky
- Occupation: Actor
- Years active: 1979–2018

José Clemente "Nonong" de Andrés (May 4, 1947 – November 6, 2018), popularly known by his stage name Bangkay (transl. Corpse), was a Filipino actor.

== Career ==
de Andrés made his debut in acting as an extra in Kisame Street which starred Dolphy, Panchito and Nida Blanca. de Andrés was initially hesitant to take up an acting career, stating that he accepted the role just for fun, but eventually committed to it full-time.

He frequently took roles as an extra in horror and comedy films in the 1980s to the 1990s, appearing in more than a hundred films. He often played dead in several films which earned him the nickname "Bangkay". Due to low pay, de Andrés decided to leave show business and remain a bachelor for the rest of his life.

After retiring, Bangkay was entrusted to take care of a friend's son in Plaridel, Quezon until his adoptive son went to the United States to study college. Sometime in 2005, he began managing a beach resort owned by the town mayor, watching over the place for at least eight years.

Bangkay returned to acting, and took a role in Forevermore. He and fellow horror film colleague Lilia Cuntapay became known as part of a love team dubbed as "BangLi" due to their roles in the series. Because of this, he and Cuntapay were invited as hurados for It's Showtime's Magpasikat Season 6 in 2015.

== Personal life ==
De Andrés never married and had no children. A Masbate native, de Andrés started his involvement in the entertainment industry as a layout artist for RVQ Productions. which was established by comedian, Dolphy.

== Death ==
De Andrés died at the age of 71 on November 6, 2018, in Plaridel, Quezon, after suffering multiple illnesses including emphysema.

== Selected filmography ==
=== Film ===
Year	Title	Role	Note(s)	Ref(s)
1976	Kisame Street		Extra	
1980	John & Marsha '80			
1982	Dancing Master 2: Macao Connection		Credited as Andres de Andres	
1983	Tengteng de Sarapen	Kalansay #3	Credited as Andres de Andres	
1985	Nagalit ang Patay sa Haba ng Lamay		Credited as Nonong de Andres	
1986	Tu-yay and His Magic Payong	Zombie Leader	Uncredited	
1986	Salamamgkero	Akay		
1986	Payaso			
1987	Huwag Mong Buhayin ang Bangkay	Lucio's disciple		
1988	Sa Dulo ng Baril		Credited as Nonong de Andres	
1988	Jockey T'yan		Credited as Nonong de Andres	
1988	Patrolman			
1989	Sgt. Niñonuevo: The Fastest Gun Alive of WPD		Credited as Nonong de Guzman	
1990	"Ako ang Batas" -Gen. Tomas Karingal			
1990	Si Prinsipe Abante at ang Ibong Adarna	Doctor		
1993	Dagul	Totoy		
1993	Manila Boy	Turko's henchmen no. 2		
1994	The Fatima Buen Story	The Omen		
1994	Shake, Rattle & Roll V	Pido	"Impakto" segment	
1995	Run Barbi Run	Chris		
1995	Ang Tipo Kong Lalake (Maginoo pero Medyo Bastos)	Beggar		
1995	Magic Kombat	Albularyo		
2000	Gigil	Pedro		
2001	Sgt. Maderazo: Bayad Na Pati Kaluluwa Mo	Celso	Credited as Nonong de Guzman	
2003	Lastikman	Spanky		
2003	Woman of Breakwater	Taong grasa		
2005	Okey Ka, Pare Ko: Soon to Be a Legend	Django		
2007	Dobol Trobol: Lets Get Redi 2 Rambol!	Holdupper 2		
2007	Scaregivers	Prison cell mayor		
2007	Enteng Kabisote 4: Okay Ka, Fairy Ko... The Beginning of the Legend	Aswang		
2009	Ang Darling Kong Aswang	Banong		
2010	Si Agimat at si Enteng Kabisote	Zombie		
2011	Pak! Pak! My Dr. Kwak!	Hospital patient	Credited as Nonong Andres	
2012	Si Agimat, si Enteng Kabisote at si Ako	Yatpa-Yatpa		
2016	Lumayo Ka Nga sa Akin	Lolo	"Asawa ni Marie" segment	
2016	Enteng Kabisote 10 and the Abangers	Bibi		
2017	Amalanhig: The Vampire Chronicle			

=== Television ===
Year	Title	Role
2014	Forevermore	Mang Bangky
2015	#ParangNormal Activity	Papa Lits
2016	FPJ's Ang Probinsyano	Mang Gorio
2016	Maynila	
2016	Tsuperhero	Old Bokutox/Bokutox/Fr. Evangelista
2017	Dear Uge	
2017	Alyas Robin Hood	
2018	Bagani	Laman
2018	Inday Will Always Love You	Tegi
