= Magic Kombat =

1995 Philippine comedy fantasy film

- Theatrical release poster
- Directed by: Junn Cabreira
- Screenplay by: Al Marcelo
- Story by: Junn Cabreira
- Produced by: Edgar Abanilla
- Starring: Smokey Manaloto; Eric Fructuoso
- Cinematography: Rudy Diño
- Edited by: Rene Tala
- Music by: Edwin "Kiko" Ortega
- Production company: Mahogany Pictures
- Distributed by: Mahogany Pictures
- Release date: December 25, 1995
- Running time: 104 minutes
- Country: Philippines
- Language: Filipino

Magic Kombat is a 1995 Philippine sci-fi fantasy comedy film written and directed by Junn Cabreira. The film stars Smokey Manaloto and Eric Fructuoso. The film centers around Mario and Luigi as they are accidentally transported into a video game world and are forced to fight their way out of it. It was one of the entries in the 1995 Metro Manila Film Festival.

Many of the film's scenarios, sound effects and characters–including that of Mario and Luigi–were unauthorized parodies of Super Mario Bros., Street Fighter II and other video games popular in the Philippines during the 80s and 90s.

== Plot ==
Working students Mario (Manaloto) and Luigi (Fructuoso), become recently-unemployed after an incident at a mall and struggle to make ends meet until they find employment as janitors and technicians at a school, where they get a chance to study.

When a video game character named Rio (Note: A female pastiche of Ryu from Street Fighter.) suddenly gets materialized into the real world during a gaming session by Mario on a stormy night, the Mario brothers along with their friend Diana set out to get Rio back to her home world, but things get complicated when Mario and Luigi are sucked into the video game realm instead of Rio. The two brothers are then forced to fight their way through each of the game's levels (Note: Loosely based on various popular video games such as Mortal Kombat and Street Fighter II.) and are later aided by Rio who made her way back to her home realm. After a final encounter with supernatural creatures in a cave, Mario and Luigi use the gems they retrieved from their previous encounters, unlocking the door which leads them back to the real world.

Back in their old job as janitors, Mario and Luigi chance upon a student who bears a striking resemblance to Rio.

== Cast ==
- Smokey Manaloto as Mario
- Eric Fructuoso as Luigi
- Dandin Ranillo as Janitor
- Beth Tamayo as Diana
- Joanne Pascual as Rio
- Sharmaine Suarez as Blanka
- Ernie Ortega as Samurai Man
- Aga Fazon as Gorilla
- Jan Cassie Espolong as Goko
- Cita Astals as School Dean
- Jaime Fabregas as Asst. Dean
- Francis Enriquez as Student
- Nonong de Andres as Albularyo
- Solita Carreon as Recruiter
- Cris Daluz as Uncle Teong

== Awards ==
Year	Awards	Category	Recipient	Result	Ref.
1995	21st Metro Manila Film Festival	Best Actress	Joanne Pascual	Nominated	
1995	21st Metro Manila Film Festival	Best Actress	Beth Tamayo	Nominated	
1995	21st Metro Manila Film Festival	Best Supporting Actress	Sharmaine Suarez	Nominated	
