= Muling Umawit ang Puso =

1995 drama film by Joel C. Lamangan

- mid-2000s VCD release cover
- Directed by: Joel Lamangan
- Written by: Ricky Lee
- Produced by: William C. Leary
- Starring: Nora Aunor; Donna Cruz; Ian de Leon
- Cinematography: Ricardo Jacinto
- Edited by: Jess Navarro
- Music by: Vehnee Saturno
- Production company: Viva Films
- Distributed by: Viva Films
- Release date: 25 December 1995
- Running time: 130 minutes
- Country: Philippines
- Language: Filipino

Muling Umawit ang Puso (English: The Heart Sings Again) is a 1995 Philippine drama film directed by Joel Lamangan from a story and screenplay written by Ricky Lee. Starring Nora Aunor, Donna Cruz, and Ian de Leon, with the supporting cast including Michael de Mesa, Albert Martinez, Ricky Davao, and Rita Avila, the film follows a woman, who used to be a well-known singer and actress, helps her nephew's girlfriend to become like her, in order to take revenge against the people who ruined her life.

Produced and distributed by Viva Films, the film was theatrically released on 25 December 1995, as one of the entries at the 21st Metro Manila Film Festival, where it won the most awards including Best Picture.

== Plot ==
In 1978, Loida Verrano was a well-known singer-actress whose fans admired her around the entire country. However, her life took a downturn when she found her lover, Tony Gallardo, committed infidelity with another woman and witnessed her pregnant sister trampled to death by a stampede of fans. Now devastated, Loida retired from the entertainment world while Tony, her ex-lover, became a lawmaker and married Glenda Andrada, and Diosdado Rivera became a full-fledged director. For Diosdado, he hoped that Loida would come back and create a film with her.

Seventeen years later, Loida became the owner of a woodcarving business and currently serves as the guardian of her nephew, Vincent. One day, Vincent introduces his girlfriend, Noemi Salazar, whose mother is a big fan of Loida. Loida later helped Noemi to fulfill her dream of becoming a singer-actress and sought the help of her friends Dindo, who is now retired from writing, and Dado, who is also a political activist. Noemi's popularity continues to rise. However, Loida discovered from her lover Miguel, a newspaper columnist, that he wrote an article about her ex-boyfriend Tony. He exposed Tony alongside Senator Labrador, who were involved in illegal gambling, white slavery, and many crimes. When Noemi was about to leave with Vincent, Loida stopped her as she heard about her deal with Glenda.

A confrontation ensued, and Noemi said that if she became famous, she would never be like Loida. She also said that the reason why she's helping her, is using her to continue her career. Because of this, Noemi decided to cut ties with Loida. Miguel was later beaten and killed by Tony's men. Loida and Dado also learned from Carla, one of Dado's talents, about Senator Labrador and Tony's crimes. They would sexually abuse young women who wanted to enter showbiz. She also told her about the murder of Miguel and warned them that Noemi might suffer the same fate. However, Carla killed herself. Badong, a former movie worker, admits to Loida that he's the one responsible for the stampede that happened at her concert, which killed Lani. He was asked by Tony and Glenda to make a chaos.

Dado and Dindo asked Loida to help Noemi, as she will be one of the performers in their political rally. But Loida insisted that she still fears for herself. But Dado encouraged her. Noemi asked for forgiveness to Loida. Vincent also told Noemi about what will happen to her at the hands of Tony. Loida, alongside Dado, Dindo, Badong, and some members of the media, appeared at Tony's political rally while giving her open letter to the people who attended. She then exposed Senator Labrador and Tony's crimes, including the murder of Miguel. One of Tony's men was about to shoot Loida, but Dado shielded her and was shot instead.

At the awarding ceremony, Loida received a special award that she dedicated to Miguel and Diosdado. Then, she and Noemi performed a duet together, with Vincent and Noemi's mother watching them. The film ends with Loida's visit to Miguel and Dado's graves.

== Cast ==
- Nora Aunor as Loida Verrano, a singer-actress
- Donna Cruz as Noemi Salazar, Vincent's girlfriend
- Ian De Leon as Vincent, Loida's nephew and the son of Loida's only sister
- Ricky Davao as Cong. Tony Gallardo
- Albert Martinez as Miguel Sanchez
- Rita Avila as Glenda Andrada
- Michael De Mesa as Diosdado Rivera, an aspiring director who wanted to cast Loida in the project she promised to be part of
- Suzette Ranillo as Lani
- Jennifer Sevilla as Karla
- Mandy Ochoa as Michael
- Luz Valdez as Gracia
- Lucita Soriano as Mameng
- Jim Pebangco as Badong
- Rolando Tinio as Dindo
- Tony Mabesa as Sen. Labrador
- Marie Barbacui as Esper

== Production ==
Following the success of The Flor Contemplacion Story, the film was announced in July 1995 with Nora Aunor, Donna Cruz, and Ian de Leon as part of the cast. Bing Loyzaga was initially cast in the film, but backed out due to scheduling conflicts and was replaced by Rita Avila.

== Reception ==
=== Critical reception ===
The film received dominantly positive reviews. Noel Vera praised the story's strong beginning and climax but dismissed its ending as a "letdown" from combining the subplots into one. He also praised the performances of the stars. Isah Red of the Manila Standard considers the film an honest one. He praised Lamangan for inserting "truth and honesty" into the story as if he's "capturing reality" in the film. He praised the performances of the stars, including Aunor, for giving "cinematic truth to her character".

=== Accolades ===
Year	Group	Category	Nominee	Result	Ref.
1995	Metro Manila Film Festival	Best Picture	Muling Umawit ang Puso	Won	
1995	Metro Manila Film Festival	Best Director	Joel Lamangan	Won	
1995	Metro Manila Film Festival	Best Actress	Nora Aunor	Won	
1995	Metro Manila Film Festival	Best Supporting Actress	Donna Cruz	Won	
1995	Metro Manila Film Festival	Best Supporting Actor	Albert Martinez	Won	
1995	Metro Manila Film Festival	Best Art Production		Won	
1995	Metro Manila Film Festival	Best Screenplay	Ricky Lee	Won	
1995	Metro Manila Film Festival	Best Story	Ricky Lee	Won	
1995	Metro Manila Film Festival	Best Music		Won	
1995	Metro Manila Film Festival	Best Theme Song	Muling Umawit ang Puso	Won	
1995	Metro Manila Film Festival	Gatpuno Antonio J. Villegas Cultural Awards	Muling Umawit ang Puso	Won	
1996	FAMAS Filipino Academy of Movie Arts and Sciences Awards	Best Supporting Actress	Donna Cruz	Nominated	
1996	Gawad Urian Awards (Manunuri ng Pelikulang Pilipino)	Best Supporting Actor	Albert MArtinez	Nominated	
1996	Gawad Urian Awards (Manunuri ng Pelikulang Pilipino)	Best Supporting Actress	Jeniffer Sevilla	Nominated	
1996	Gawad Urian Awards (Manunuri ng Pelikulang Pilipino)	Best Music	Vehnee Saturno	Nominated	
1996	Young Critics Circle	Best Performance by Male or Female, Adult or Child, Individual or Ensemble in Leading or Supporting Role	Nora Aunor	Nominated	
