= Boy Mondragon =

Filipino singer (born 1958)

Boy Mondragon (born 1958) is a Filipino singer. He worked for Vicor Artists and was particularly successful on Filipino radio in the 1970s. He is best known for his hit Rain.

== Awards ==
| Year | Award giving body | Category | Nominated work | Results |
|---|---|---|---|---|
| 1971 | Awit Awards | Most Promising Male Singer | — | Won |

== Discography ==
- A House is Not a Home - 1970
- Come Back to Me - 1970
- I Know - 1970
- Only You - 1970
- Please Forgive Me - 1970
- Rain - 1970
- Road to Love - 1970
- To Forget You - 1970
- What Am I Gonna Do - 1970
- With My Regrets - 1970
- Yester Me, Yester You, Yesterday - 1970

== See also ==
- Donna Cruz
- George Canseco
