= Now and Forever (Donna Cruz album) =

Studio album by Donna Cruz
- Released: March 11, 2016
- Genre: Pop, OPM
- Language: English, Tagalog
- Label: Star Music
- Producer: Vehnee Saturno, Jonathan Manalo, Edwin Marollano

Donna Cruz chronology
| Silver Series: Donna (2006) | Now and Forever (2016) | Definitive: The Donna Cruz Collection (2016) |

Singles from Now and Forever
- 1. "Langit ang Pag-ibig" Released: February 2016; 2. "A Love to Last" Released: April 2016

Now and Forever is the eighth studio album by Filipino singer Donna Cruz, released in the Philippines in 2016 by Star Music. The album marked Cruz's return to the OPM music industry after being absent for more than fifteen years. It is her first studio album released under Star Music.

== Background ==
In 1998, Cruz married ophthalmologist Potenciano Larrazabal III, and in 2000 she took an indefinite hiatus from the Philippine entertainment industry to focus on her personal life. Larrazabal and Cruz have three children named Isabella Adriana, Potenciano IV, and Iñigo Renato. Though Cruz maintained a low profile private life in Cebu, she occasionally appeared on television for singing engagements, performing jingles for Pampers ("Gabing Payapa") in 2007, Lactum ("Kailan Ma'y Panatag") in 2008 and Similac ("Wonderful World") in 2015.

In 2014, a video of Cruz singing "Let It Go" went viral. The buzz on Cruz singing the Disney song prompted album producer Jonathan Manalo of Star Music to contact Shirley Kuan, Cruz's longtime agent if Cruz was interested in returning to the music industry. In January 2016, Cruz officially signed as a recording artist under the Star Music label. At this point, Cruz had already began recording new material with Vehnee Saturno. The Saturno-penned track "Langit ang Pag-ibig" serves as the lead single from the album.

== Promotion and sales ==
Cruz first appeared in Tonight with Boy Abunda to confirm her comeback to the music scene and sang some of her old hits in the show. She performed "Isang Tanong, Isang Sagot" and her latest single "Langit ang Pag-ibig" in ASAP to launch the release of the album. Cruz also appeared in a two-day special episode of Kris TV together with her mother Yolly Cruz-Yrastorza, and cousin Sunshine Cruz. Cruz appeared as a guest in Gandang Gabi Vice. From the initial announcement of the album being available on 4 March 2016, the physical copy of the album was released on 11 March 2016. According to local record outlets in the Philippines, Now and Forever reached platinum in four days, making Now and Forever the fastest album from a Filipina recording artist to achieve such status.

Cruz shot music videos for "Langit ang Pag-ibig" and "A Love to Last" (also written by Saturno) in February 2016.

== Track listing ==
| No. | Title | Length |
|---|---|---|
| 1. | "A Love to Last" | 4:20 |
| 2. | "Langit ang Pag-ibig" | 3:51 |
| 3. | "Ikaw Lang ang Mamahalin" | 3:57 |
| 4. | "Friends" | 3:33 |
| 5. | "Dapat Ka Bang Mahalin" | 3:47 |
| 6. | "Ika'y Mahal Pa Rin" | 5:27 |
| 7. | "Nag-iisang Ikaw" | 3:58 |
| 8. | "Hanggang" | 4:51 |

- Instrumental versions of all eight tracks are included in the album and serve as tracks 9–16.
