= Donna Cruz =

Filipino actress and singer (born 1977)

- Born: Donna Cruz Yrastorza; February 14, 1977 (age 49); Manila, Philippines
- Occupations: Singer; actress
- Years active: 1984–present
- Spouse: Dr. Potenciano "Yong" Larrazabal III (m. 1998)
- Children: 3
- Musical career
- Origin: Manila, Philippines
- Genres: OPM; pop
- Instruments: Vocals; piano
- Labels: Viva Records; Star Music
- Website: donnacruz.com/definitive/

Donna Cruz Yrastorza-Larrazabal (Tagalog pronunciation: [ˈkɾus], born February 14, 1977) is a Filipino singer and actress. Since the middle of the 1990s, she has released 8 studio albums, and featured as an actress in local films. She has also appeared on four soundtrack albums.

== Biography ==
=== 1988–1991: Early career beginnings and Donna ===
Donna Cruz Yrastorza was born on February 14, 1977 in Manila, Philippines. As a child, Cruz joined pageants and singing competitions. Her first stint in showbiz was when she appeared as a finalist in Eat Bulaga!'s Little Miss Philippines child beauty pageant. She won Bulilit Kampeon in 1988, and signed with Viva Records in 1989. She released her debut album Donna in 1991 at the age of 14, featuring an original single "Kapag Tumibok ang Puso" and cover of Boy Mondragon's song "Rain". Her self-titled debut album is the biggest-selling debut album by a Filipino artist, making Cruz the youngest and only artist in the Philippines to reach 9× Platinum with her first album, a feat that she accomplished before becoming a teenager.

=== 1992–1994: Kurot sa Puso, Langit Na Naman and breakthrough as an actress ===
In 1992, Cruz joined German Moreno's That's Entertainment, a daily variety show that featured young and upcoming new talents. She released Kurot sa Puso in early 1993 and later that year starred in the movie Kadenang Bulaklak alongside Vina Morales, Ana Roces, Angelu de Leon and Nida Blanca. She joined the sitcoms Alabang Girls and Ober Da Bakod, both produced by VIVA Entertainment Group. In 1994, she released Langit Na Naman, her third studio album. That same year that she starred in another drama produced by Viva, Pangako Ng Kahapon, together with Agot Isidro, Alice Dixson and Charito Solis.

=== 1995–1996: Habang May Buhay ===
In 1995, the Viva Entertainment Group gave Cruz a lead role in the soap opera Villa Quintana, opposite actor Keempee de Leon. She also starred in the films Campus Girls, Okey Si Ma'am, and Love Notes: The Movie. She released her fourth album, Habang May Buhay, which comprised love songs and featured the single "Only Me and You". Later that year, Cruz joined actress Nora Aunor in the drama film, Muling Umawit ang Puso, for which she won Best Supporting Actress at the Metro Manila Film Festival.

In 1996, her single "Habang May Buhay" was released as a tie-in with a romantic movie of the same name. Habang May Buhay was top-billed by Cruz, Ian de Leon, Candy Pangilinan and veteran actress Hilda Koronel. She also starred alongside Bong Revilla and Nanette Medved in the action romantic-comedy movie, Pag-Ibig Ko sa Iyo'y Totoo. Cruz recorded a duet with American singer Jason Everly, called "Wish", son of Phil Everly of the Everly Brothers in 1996. Later that year, Cruz starred in DoReMi together with Regine Velasquez and Mikee Cojuangco. By the end of 1996, Cruz released a holiday record Merry Christmas Donna which included the single "Muling Sumapit ang Pasko," written by Cruz's longtime collaborator Vehnee Saturno.

=== 1997–1998: Pure Donna ===
In 1997, Cruz starred in Dahil Tanging Ikaw alongside Ian de Leon and Jao Mapa. Her album Pure Donna was also released and she hosted a musical special Pure Donna that was broadcast on GMA 7. The special won the Best Musical Special in the 1997 Aliw Awards. Later that year, Cruz reunited with Jason Everly to star in the romantic-comedy film, Isang Tanong, Isang Sagot. She also joined Eat Bulaga! as a co-host and performer, and was part of SOP, a Sunday musical variety show.

Cruz's last project before her marriage in September 1998 was in the TV series Growing Up where she had a supporting role to actress Angelu de Leon. A compilation named The Best of Donna was released to commemorate Cruz's ten-year catalog with Viva Entertainment from 1989–1998.

=== 1999–2004: Hulog Ng Langit and career hiatus ===
Cruz released her final album under Viva Records in 1999, entitled "Hulog ng Langit", which focused on love songs and lullabies. At age 22, she gave birth to a daughter and released "Ikaw Pala 'Yon" her final single under her then-current contract with Viva Entertainment Group.

In 2001, Viva Records released Donna Cruz Sings Her Greatest Hits and in November of that year, performed at the Philippine Advertising Congress Awards in Cebu. After finishing her contract with Viva, she graduated with a Bachelor of Science degree in Computer Science from Cebu Doctors University. In 2003, she gave birth to a son and made a guest appearance in Bahay Mo Ba 'To? as Lynnette, reprising her role in Villa Quintana in 2004. In 2008, Cruz featured on the song "Kailanma'y Panatag", a song written by Ogie Alcasid and Nicole Tolentino, and performed the song in ASAP.

In 2010, Cruz appeared as a celebrity contestant in Wowowee, and performed "I Can" with fellow celebrity contestants Dimples Romana and Nikki Valdez. A year later, Cruz appeared in the sitcom Daldalita with Ogie Alcasid and Manilyn Reynes where she played the role of Daldalita's mother. In that same year, Cruz performed on stage in GMA 7's Party Pilipinas singing her hit single, "Rain".

=== 2015–present: Now and Forever and return to the entertainment industry ===
In 2015, Cruz sang the Similac Gain School theme song, "Wonderful World". Months later, Cruz returned to the music scene, signing her comeback album with Star Music in January 2016. She appeared on Tonight with Boy Abunda, Kris TV and ASAP to promote her latest album, Now and Forever.

== Personal life ==
Cruz was born on February 14, 1977, to parents Renato Yrastorza and Yolly Cruz. In February 1998, Cruz became engaged to Potenciano "Yong" Larrazabal III, an ophthalmologist from Cebu. They married since September 19, 1998, and have three children, Ysabella Adriana, Cian and Gio. Ysabella Adriana graduated from Cebu Doctors' University in August 2021. In August 2024, Cian earned his Bachelor's degree in Medical Biology with magna cum laude.

== Discography ==
Cruz has released eight studio albums, four soundtrack albums and three compilation albums. Cruz was signed to Viva Records between 1991-2000. In 2016, she signed with Star Music.

=== Studio albums ===
- Donna (1991)
- Kurot sa Puso (1993)
- Langit Na Naman (1994)
- Habang May Buhay (1995)
- Merry Christmas Donna (1996)
- Pure Donna (1997)
- Hulog ng Langit (1999)
- Now and Forever (2016)

=== Soundtrack albums ===
- Campus Girls: Music from the Motion Picture (1995)
- Love Notes - The Movie: Music from the Motion Picture (1995)
- Muling Umawit Ang Puso: Music from the Motion Picture (1995)
- DoReMi: Music from the Motion Picture (1996)

=== Compilation albums ===
- The Best of Donna (Viva Collection Forever) (1998)
- The Best of Love Duets (Viva Collection Forever) (1998)
- Donna Cruz Sings Her Greatest Hits (2001)
- Silver Series: Donna (2006)

== Filmography ==
=== Film ===
Year	Movie	Role
1991	Andrew Ford Medina: Huwag Kang Gamol	Donna
1991	Darna	Sally
1992	Pangako Sa'yo	
1993	Pretty Boy	
1993	Ang Boyfriend Kong Gamol	Donna
1993	Row 4: Ang Baliktorians	Dory Pangilinan
1993	Manchichiritchit	Donna
1993	Tom & Jerry: Hindi Kaming Hayop	
1994	Pinagbiyak na Bunga	Kristine
1994	Kadenang Bulaklak	Violy Abolencia
1994	Pintsik	Gilda
1994	Ober Da Bakod: The Movie	Muning
1994	Pangako ng Kahapon	Belinda Tavera
1995	Campus Girls	Georgie
1995	Okey Si Ma'am!	Lailani Aranas
1995	Love Notes: The Movie	Ditas
1995	Muling Umawit ang Puso	Noemi Salazar
1996	Habang May Buhay	Pia
1996	Pag-ibig Ko Sayo'y Totoo	Dulce Lopez
1996	DoReMi	Donette Legaspi
1997	Dahil Tanging Ikaw	Erica and Cecile
1997	Isang Tanong, Isang Sagot	Rizelle

=== Television ===
Year	Title	Role
1988	Eat Bulaga's Little Miss Philippines	Herself
1992–1994	Alabang Girls	Bighani / Big Honey
1993	That's Entertainment	Herself/host
1993–1997	Ober Da Bakod	Muning
1995	Wishing for a Soulmate	Libay
1995	Hustisya	
1995	Laging Nasa Puso	
1994–1997	Villa Quintana	Lynette Quintana
1995–1998	Eat Bulaga!	Co-host
1998	Growing Up	Stephanie Acosta
1998–2000, 2016	ASAP	Herself / Performer
2011	Party Pilipinas	Guest
2011	Daldalita	Carmela de Leon-Matias
2016	Tonight with Boy Abunda	Herself / Guest
2016	Kris TV	Herself / Guest
2016	Gandang Gabi, Vice!	Herself / Guest
2017	Full House Tonight	Herself / Guest Performer

== Awards ==
=== Awit Awards ===
Year	Nominee / work	Award	Result
1992	Herself	Best New Female Recording Artist	Won
1995	"Only Me and You"	Best Ballad Recording	Won

=== Film Academy of the Philippines ===
Year	Nominee / work	Award	Result
1994	Pangako ng Kahapon	Best Supporting Actress	Nominated

=== Star Awards ===
Year	Nominee / work	Award	Result
1994	Pangako ng Kahapon	Best Supporting Actress	Nominated

=== Metro Manila Film Festival ===
Year	Nominee / work	Award	Result
1995	Muling Umawit ang Puso	Best Supporting Actress	Won

=== Aliw Awards ===
Year	Nominee / work	Award	Result
1997	Pure Donna	Best Musical Special	Won
