= Jessa Zaragoza =

Filipino actress and singer (born 1979)

- Born: Richelle Ann Mallari Loyola; January 31, 1979 (age 47)
- Occupations: Singer; actress; TV host; model
- Years active: 1987–present
- Spouse: Dingdong Avanzado (m. 2001)
- Children: Jayda Avanzado
- Musical career
- Genre: OPM
- Instruments: Vocals
- Labels: OctoArts-EMI Phils. (now PolyEast Records) (1997–2000); Star Music (2000–2003; 2017–present); Universal (2005); MCA (2009); GMA Music (2012)

Richelle Ann Mallari Loyola-Avanzado (born January 31, 1979), better known by her stage name Jessa Zaragoza, is a Filipino commercial model, singer and actress. She is known as the "Phenomenal Diva" and "Jukebox Queen of the 90s" for her first studio album Just Can't Help Feelin' in 1997 with the hit carrier single "Bakit Pa?" which became a hit ballad in the Philippines during 1997–1999.

== Biography ==
Zaragoza was a GMA Network talent using her real name Richelle Ann Loyola when she auditioned for Little Miss Philippines in Eat Bulaga! in 1987. In the early 1990s, she was part of German Moreno's longest running variety show, That's Entertainment under the stage name Jessa Kintanar. She was also part of comedy shows Alabang Girls on ABC (now TV5) from 1992 to 1994. She did guesting stints for GMA and Viva Entertainment TV programs in the mid 90s she has guest starred in Bubble Gang, Beh Bote Nga and Attagirl in 2001 for ABS-CBN.

Zaragoza, known for her singing career, signed with OctoArts EMI Philippines (now PolyEast Records). Her debut album, Just Can't Help Feelin', was released in 1997. The album's carrier single, "Bakit Pa?", also served as the soundtrack for a Valentine's Day film featuring Zaragoza, alongside Troy Montero and Diether Ocampo. Directed by Jose Javier Reyes, the romantic comedy film Bakit Pa? was a joint production of OctoArts Films and GMA Films, hitting theaters on February 3, 1999.

Her second album,Phenomenal, followed in 1999. Zaragoza also had a notable presence in the soap opera Di Ba't Ikaw, which aired on GMA Network from May to October 1999.

In 2000, she released new hit singles such as "Ibigay Mo Na", "Siya Ba ang Dahilan", and "Kung Kailan Pa".

She transferred to network ABS-CBN from 2000 to 2004, and signed a deal with its recording company Star Records, releasing her next two albums Ibigay Mo Na (2000) and Kahit Na Ilang Umaga (2003). She also sang the theme songs for soap operas and TV series of ABS-CBN and GMA.

In 2001, Zaragoza sang the theme song of the ABS-CBN afternoon soap, Recuerdo de Amor which ran from 2001 to 2003. She was also cast in another ABS-CBN soap which starred Nora Aunor, Carol Banawa and Desiree del Valle entitled Bituin. She also starred on the hit sitcom Attagirl alongside Vanessa Del Bianco, Andrea del Rosario and Desiree del Valle which ran for three seasons.

In 2003, she sang the theme song of ABS-CBN's Sana'y Wala Nang Wakas. The song was featured on her album Kahit Na Ilang Umaga, released by Star Records.

In 2004, she participated at the Himig Handog Songwriting Contest interpreting the song "Hindi Na Bale" composed by Jimmy Antiporda.

In 2006, she collaborated with her singer-songwriter husband, Dingdong Avanzado on the duet album, Laging Ikaw, released under Universal Records. During the 2006 period she had worked with fellow friends comedian Marissa Sanchez, and actress Ara Mina on a worldwide concert tour called The Divas Tour.

In 2007, controversy erupted between her and Rufa Mae Quinto when Quinto allegedly interpreted and stated that Zaragoza was the reason of hers and Dingdong's breakup. It became one of Philippine showbiz's most memorable breakups. Zaragoza defended herself against the allegations on a live interview on GMA's Startalk. Quinto appeared on YES magazine as a featured artist on the front cover, and in the article she talked about her personal life and past relationships.

She collaborated with film director Mel Chionglo in Malikot na Mundo with actors Lara Morena, Raymond Bagatsing, and Patrick Guzman, her last film with OctoArts Films.

In 2008, she sang a revival of Didith Reyes' hit song "Bakit Ako Mahihiya" for the critically acclaimed series Eva Fonda starring Cristine Reyes. She released her album Jessa Sings the Great Musical Icons under MCA Music in 2009. In 2012, she released her seventh studio album entitled Pag Wala Na ang Ulan with GMA Music. From 2012 to present, she has been appearing on the weekly comedy show Pepito Manaloto as DeeDee alongside veteran comedian Nova Villa. This is Zaragoza's return to comedy after the 2001 sitcom Attagirl on ABS-CBN.

In 2009, after a series of shows in the U.S. together with Avanzado, Zaragoza came back on prime time television in the remake of the Mexican telenovela Rosalinda. She also released an album that featured all cover versions on Jessa Sings the Great Musical Icons. The album paid tribute to such musical legends such as Elvis Presley, the Beatles, Tina Turner, Sting and the Police, Madonna and Stevie Wonder.

In 2010, she went back to ABS-CBN to be part of the short-lived prime time television series, 1DOL. She then made several guest TV appearances, performing renditions of songs with Avanzado.

In 2012, she portrayed Angela in the afternoon soap based on the 1989 film produced by Seiko Films' Ruben Marcelino, Kokak as the mother to title protagonist Sarah Lahbati. In July of that year, her album Pag Wala Na Ang Ulan was released under GMA Records. The album includes the song "Nasaan" from the TV series Kung Aagawin Mo Ang Langit on GMA.

On August 3, 2013, she released a digital single called "Missing You" in two different languages; Tagalog and English.

On August 7, 2014, Zaragoza interpreted "Bumabalik Ang Nagdaan" with Star Music (formerly known as Star Records) for the Himig Handog P-Pop Love Songs. This is her third time to interpret a song for the Himig Handog Love Song Contest, together with her former singles "Susubukan Kong Muli" (2001) and "Hindi Na Bale" (2005) were released during those years. Hindi Na Bale was also her second time working with Jimmy Antiporda and was also revived by Bugoy Drillon in 2010. This Is her comeback to the recording company after 9 years for the Interpretation of the song her previous works were the albums Ibigay Mo Na (2000) and Kahit Na Ilang Umaga (2003–2004) album.

The year 2017 marked a peak Zaragoza's career when she and her husband Avanzado launched their 20/30 album, a revival and commemorative album.

In 2021, she is one of the Jukebosses in the hit karaoke TV show Sing Galing with other singers and songwriters Rey Valera, Randy Santiago and K Brosas on TV5.

== Personal life ==
Zaragoza married Dingdong Avanzado on March 18, 2001. Their marriage was highly publicized in the media, especially on tabloids and television talk shows. They have a daughter, actress-singer Jayda, who was born on June 1, 2003. The couple briefly lived in Vallejo, California, United States, in 2007, during which they were collectively dubbed as the "Prince of Pop and Jukebox Queen of the Philippines".

Zaragoza has a younger brother, Lloyd Zaragoza, who is an actor and singer.

In August 2024, after suffering from hoarse voice she underwent a medical procedure to heal her vocal cords polyps and esophageal varices from her vocal folds at St. Luke's Medical Center – Global City.

== Filmography ==
=== Television ===
Year	Title	Role	Notes
1986–1996	That's Entertainment	Herself	Host
1989–1994	Anna Luna		
1992	Alabang Girls		
1993	Kool Skool	Various	
1994	Chibugan Na!	Herself / guest performer	
1994–1997	Villa Quintana	Patrice Quintana	Supporting role / Antagonist
1997	Masamang Damo	Menchu	
1999	Di Ba't Ikaw	Hasmin Cardenas	Lead role
2001	Attagirl	Amanda	Main role
2002–2003	Bituin	Sultana Andromeda / Ms. Andromeda	Main role
2009	Rosalinda	Evangelina Kintanar-del Castillo	Supporting role / Antagonist
2009	SOP	Herself	Guest
2009	Celebrity Duets: Philippine Edition 3	Herself	
2010	1DOL	Magdalena	Main role
2010	Showtime	Herself	Celebrity Judge
2010	Pepito Manaloto	Jenny	Supporting role
2010	Wansapanataym: Super Kikay and her Flying Pagong	Elma	Episode guest
2011	Willing Willie	Herself	Guest appearance
2011–2012	Ruben Marcelino's Kokak	Angela	Supporting role / Protagonist
2012	Wansapanataym: Remote Emote	Amy	Episode guest
2012	Maalaala Mo Kaya: Aso	Ria	Episode guest
2012	Wil Time Bigtime	Herself	Special guest
2012–2013	Cielo de Angelina	Congresswoman Teresa Alfonso	Supporting role / Protagonist
2012–2021	Pepito Manaloto: Ang Tunay Na Kuwento	Deedee Kho	Main role / Protagonist / Antagonist
2014	Paraiso Ko'y Ikaw	Yvette Bartolome-Rodrigo	Supporting role / Primary Antagonist
2016	Eat Bulaga!	Herself	Just Duet Performer
2016	Dear Uge	Julia Pia	Episode Guest
2018	Your Face Sounds Familiar	Herself	Special guest
2020	Wowowin	Herself	Special guest
2020	Tagisan ng Galing	Herself	Judge
2021–2022; 2025–2026	Sing Galing!	Herself	Judge
2025	It's Showtime	Herself	Guest appearance
2025	Pepito Manaloto: Tuloy ang Kuwento	Deedee Kho	
2025–present	Pepito Manaloto: Tuloy ang Kuwento	Deedee Kho	

== Discography ==
=== Solo studio albums ===
List of solo studio albums
Title	Details	Notes
Just Can't Help Feelin'	Released: 1997; Label: OctoArts EMI Music, Inc.; Formats: CD, cassette, digital download, streaming	Includes the singles "Bakit Pa?", "Pa'no Kaya", "'Di Ba't Ikaw" and "Just Can't Help Feelin'".; "Loving You" is a Minnie Ripperton cover.; Released on streaming on November 30, 2014.
Phenomenal	Released: 1999; Label: OctoArts EMI Music, Inc.; Formats: CD, cassette, digital download, streaming	
Siya Ba Ang Dahilan	Released: 2000; Label: OctoArts EMI Music, Inc.; Formats: CD, cassette, digital download, streaming	"Siya Ba Ang Dahilan" (meaning "Is She the Reason?"); Includes single "First Love".
Ibigay Mo Na	Released: October 16, 2000; Label: Star Records, Star Recording, Inc.; Formats: CD, digital download, streaming	"Ibigay Mo Na" (meaning "Give It to Me"); Includes singles "Ibigay Mo Na" and "Ikakasal Ka Na".; "Glory of Love" is a Peter Cetera cover and is a duet with her husband Dingdong Avanzado.; "Maghihintay Sayo" is a Dingdong Avanzado cover.
Kahit Na Ilang Umaga	Released: January 1, 2003; Label: Star Records, Star Recording, Inc.; Formats: CD, digital download, streaming	"Kahit Na Ilang Umaga" (meaning "Even Some Mornings"); "Kung Maibabalik" is a Dindong Avanzado cover.; "For Your Eyes Only" is a Sheena Easton cover.; "Sana'y Wala Nang Wakas" is a Sharon Cuneta cover and a Philippine primetime soap opera with thesame title aired by ABS-CBN, which Zaragoza sings the main theme song.
Jessa Sings the Great Musical Icons, Volume I	Released: August 1, 2009; Label: Universal Records, MCA Records; Formats: CD	A 13-track cover album of English songs from popular western artists.
Pag Wala Na Ang Ulan	Released: June 1, 2012; Label: GMA Records; Formats: CD, digital download, streaming	"Pag Wala Na Ang Ulan" (meaning "When the Rain is Gone"); The album consist of five original songs while the rest are instrumental versions of said songs and a piano solo of "Ayoko Na".

=== Collaborative studio albums ===
List of collaborative studio albums
Title	Details	Notes
Laging Ikaw (with Dingdong Avanzado)	Released: January 1, 2005; Label: Universal Records; Formats: CD, digital download, streaming	A 12-track duet album consisting of original and cover songs
20/30 (with Dingdong Avanzado)	Released: March 9, 2018; Label: ABS-CBN Film Productions, Inc.; Formats: digital download, streaming	An 18-track duet album consisting of Zaragoza and Avanzado's hits to commemorate their 20 to 30 years in the music industry and show business.; The album also includes "Karaoke" or "Minus One" of their hits.

=== Compilation albums ===
List of compilation albums
Title	Details	Notes
The Best of Jessa Zaragoza	Released: 1999; Label: OctoArts EMI Music, Inc.; Formats: CD, cassette	An 18-track compilation album consisting of Zaragoza's hits and songs from Just Can't Help Feelin', Phenomenal and Siya Ba Ang Dahilan.; This compilation is the final release to free her from her contract with OctoArts EMI (PolyEast Records).
The Story of Jessa Zaragoza	Released: 2002; Label: EMI Virgin Philippines Inc.; Formats: CD, digital download, streaming	Part of "The Ultimate OPM Collections" series.; It uses the same tracklisting as The Story of Jessa Zaragoza but removing 3 songs ("If", "Kahit Ako'y Nag-iisa" and "Loving You") and replacing them with "Pagkakataon", "Walang Iba" and "Hinahanap Kita".
