= Geirry Garccia =

Filipino animator, painter and filmmaker

- Garcia in 2008
- Born: Geraldo A. Garcia; June 29, 1951; Philippines
- Died: February 12, 2010 (aged 58); Verona, New Jersey, US
- Education: Far Eastern University
- Spouse: Elmaurie Garcia
- Children: 2

Geraldo A. Garccia (June 29, 1951 – February 12, 2010), known professionally as Geirry Garccia or Geirry A. Garccia, was a Filipino animator, painter and filmmaker. A prominent figure in Philippine animation since the People Power Revolution, he was recognized as a "brainchild" for his well-known pioneering mainstream animated works, predominantly Ang Panday (1986), Isko: Adventures in Animasia (1995), and Adarna: The Mythical Bird (1997).

== Career ==
Garccia is a graduate of an advertising art major from Far Eastern University, began his career as a matte artist in Image Film in 1974. According to Knowledge Channel, Garcia started his career in the Philippine film industry as a screenwriter and special effect supporter in the midst of Marcos's martial law, notably one of these films including Silip (1985).

=== Ang Panday ===
After the end of Marcos's presidency, Garccia was producing his own first animated series entitled Ang Panday (lit. The Blacksmith), an action-adventure fantasy series based on a komic character by Carlo J. Caparas (who serves as co-writer and director for that series) and Steve Gan and 1980 film of the same name by Ronwaldo Reyes, the series take place after the storyline of the first film. It was then aired over RPN 9 in November 1986.

Although it was a consistent success for two years and earned him a Special Citation from the Film Academy of the Philippines in 1987, Ang Panday lasted only for six months due to the high cost and production limitations of producing an animated feature or series.

=== Isko: Adventures in Animasia ===
OctoArts Films produced Isko: Adventures in Animasia, which Garccia co-directed with Mike Relon Makiling. The film combined live action with 30 minutes of animation sequence.

=== Talk Toons ===
Garccia produced the very first animated talk show on Philippine television entitled Talk Toons. Guest celebrities appeared in the series like Vilma Santos, Mikey Arroyo, German Moreno and former president Joseph Estrada. All were interviewed on video and transferred into animation.

=== Other works ===
Garcia was tapped to do commercials for Nickelodeon and illustrations for MacMillan Children’s books which includes projects like Little Snow Girl, Ernie and Bubba, Little Mouse, and Toyster Animation series.

== Personal life ==
Garcia had been a resident of Verona, New Jersey since 1998, and said he temporarily left his career in the Philippines and chose to live a quiet life with his family in the United States.

=== Death ===
On February 12, 2010, he died in his home in Verona, New Jersey due to a lingering heart ailment when he was 58. He was survived by his wife Elmaurie and two sons, Elginero and Gerome.

== Legacy ==
Garccia's legacy after his death has been cemented to recognition as a brainchild and one of the most important figures of Philippine animation, posthumously received a Lifetime Achievement Award at the 5th Animahenasyon Philippine Animation Festival.

In 2006, Garccia was recognized for his pioneering work in Adarna by the United Animator’s Inc. which hosted the “1st Pioneer’s Animation Recognition Night” in Makati City.

== See also ==
- Nonoy Marcelo
