= Villa Quintana =

Philippine television drama series

- Title card
- Genre: Romantic drama
- Created by: R.J. Nuevas
- Written by: R.J. Nuevas
- Directed by: Gil Tejada Jr.
- Starring: Donna Cruz; Keempee de Leon
- Theme music composer: Vehnee Saturno
- Opening theme: "Villa Quintana" by Rockstar 2
- Ending theme: "Only Me and You" by Donna Cruz
- Country of origin: Philippines
- Original language: Tagalog

Production
- Executive producer: Veronique del Rosario-Corpuz
- Camera setup: Multiple-camera setup
- Running time: 30 minutes
- Production company: Viva Television

Original release
- Network: GMA Network
- Release: November 7, 1994 – January 24, 1997

Related
- Villa Quintana (2013)

Villa Quintana (transl. Quintana estate) is a Philippine television drama romance series broadcast by GMA Network. Directed by Gil Tejada Jr., it stars Donna Cruz and Keempee de Leon. It premiered on November 7, 1994. The series concluded on January 24, 1997.

A remake aired in 2013 to 2014.

== Cast and characters ==
Lead cast

- Donna Cruz as Lynette Quintana
- Keempee de Leon as Isagani Samonte

Supporting cast

- Tony Mabesa as Manolo Quintana
- Joel Torre as Robert Quintana
- Chanda Romero as Lumeng Samonte
- Pen Medina as Felix Samonte
- Isabel Rivas as Stella Quintana
- Isabel Granada as Rochelle Quintana
- Lander Vera Perez as Jason Quintana
- Jessa Zaragoza as Patrice
- Richard De Dios as Paking
- Timmy Cruz as Elena Malvar
- Mia Gutierrez as Amparing
- Philip Lazaro as Danica
- Fame delos Santos as Leny
- Carmen Enriquez as Guada
- Archie Adamos as Gaston
- Mel Kimura as Ditas
- Onemig Bondoc as Alfon
- Naty Santiago as Syon

== Accolades ==
Accolades received by Villa Quintana
Year	Award	Category	Recipient	Result	Ref.
1996	10th PMPC Star Awards for Television	Best Drama Actor	Keempee de Leon	Won	
1996	10th PMPC Star Awards for Television	Best Drama Actress	Isabel Rivas	Won	
1996	10th PMPC Star Awards for Television	Best Drama Series	Villa Quintana	Won	
