= Viva Records (Philippines) =

Philippine record label

- Parent company: Viva Music Group
- Founded: 1986; 40 years ago
- Founder: Vicente del Rosario, Jr.
- Status: Active
- Distributor: self-distributed
- Genre: P-pop; OPM
- Country of origin: Philippines
- Location: 7/F East Tower, Tektite Towers, Exchange Road, Ortigas Center, Pasig, Metro Manila, Philippines
- Official website: vivavicor.com

Viva Records Corporation, commonly known as Viva Records, is a Philippine record label owned by Viva Music Group, a subsidiary of Viva Communications.

== History ==
Viva Records was established in 1986, 6 years after Vic del Rosario Jr. left Vicor Music. In a few years, it became among the most successful record labels in the country. Aside from releasing soundtracks, it helped establish the careers of Vina Morales, Donna Cruz, Andrew E., Agot Isidro, Sarah Geronimo and Mark Bautista, among others.

== Notable artists roster ==
=== Current ===
- 3YO
- Alamat
- Allmo$t
- Andrew E. (1990–present; Dongalo Wreckords/Viva)
- Anja Aguilar
- Arthur Nery (Viva)
- Ai-Ai delas Alas (since 2025, also with GMA Network & TV5)
- Bandang Lapis
- Basil Valdez (1982–present; in cooperation with Vicor Music Corp.)
- Billy Crawford (2018–present)
- Cup of Joe
- Danita Paner
- Daryl Ong (2021–present)
- Fairgame
- Flow G (on behalf of Ex Battalion Music)
- Heaven Peralejo (2023–present)
- Jason Farol
- Jensen Kyra
- Jeffrey Garcia (on behalf of Vicor Music)
- Kean Cipriano (O/C Records)
- Kim Molina
- King Girado (2022–present)
- Magnus Haven (Blacksheep Records Manila)
- Marion Aunor
- Mark Bautista (2003–present)
- Matteo Guidicelli (2019–present)
- Minzy (2020–present)
- Regine Velasquez (1986–1989, 1997–2006, 2017–2020, since 2025)
- Sam Concepcion (2017–present)
- Sarah Geronimo (2003–present)
- Shehyee (Viva/FlipMusic Records)
- Shy Carlos
- South Nova St. (2023–present)
- The Juans
- This Band
- True Faith
- Unique Salonga (O/C Records)
- Viva Hot Babes (2002–present)

=== Former ===
- 4th Impact (2008–2014)
- AfterImage (1996–2008)
- Agot Isidro (1993–1996)
- Allona
- Ang Grupong Pendong
- Antoinette Taus (1996–2003)
- Anthony Castelo
- April Boy Regino
- Arkasia
- Ayen Munji-Laurel (1996–2003)
- Backdraft
- BangBang
- Banig
- Bass Rhyme
- Blakdyak (1997–2007)
- Boys Will Be Boys
- Butch Montejo
- Carlo Orosa
- Chad Borja (2012)
- Charlie Green (2010–2012)
- Chiqui Pineda
- Ciel Perlas
- Ciara Sotto
- Claire dela Fuente (1989; 2008–2010; deceased)
- CNN
- Cocojam
- Death Threat
- Denmark
- Dingdong Avanzado (2012–2013)
- DJ Alvaro
- Donna Cruz (1990–2000)
- Ed Pozon
- Eddie K.
- Ego
- Ella Mae Saison (1992–2000)
- Eurasia
- Ex Battalion (2018–2019)
- Father & Sons
- Flippers
- Florante
- FOJ (Vanna Vanna)
- Freestyle (1996–2014)
- Gabby Eigenmann
- Gary Valenciano (2002–2003)
- GCLTHP Band (1996–2017)
- Gelli de Belen (1991–2003)
- Gerry Paraiso
- Hotdog (1991)
- Idelle Martinez
- Imago (2003–2006; now under Universal Records)
- Inertia
- Itchyworms (1999–2008; now under Sony Music Philippines)
- Ina Raymundo
- Iya Villania (2008–2009)
- Jaime Garchitorena
- James Reid (2012–2018; now under Careless)
- Janno Gibbs (1999–2004; 2019–2025; returned to GMA Music)
- Jaya (1996–2005)
- Jeff Arcilla
- Jett Pangan
- Jeffrey Hidalgo
- John Rendez
- Jennylyn Mercado (2010–2011)
- Joel Trinidad (1982–2005)
- Joey Albert (2009)
- Judy Ann Santos (1998–2003)
- K & the Boxers (2003–2006)
- Kristina Valdez
- Kuh Ledesma
- Krystine Marcaida
- Lance Raymundo
- Ladine Roxas
- Lani Misalucha (1998–2004)
- Lilet
- Marc Ballesteros
- Marco Sison
- Marissa
- Marlon Sediño
- Maxine
- Mayonnaise (2008–2011)
- Melissa Gibbs
- Men & Music
- Mico
- Michelle Ortega
- Miguel Vera (1991–1994)
- Mocha Girls (2009–2018)
- Mike Hanopol
- Monique Wilson (1993–1994)
- Mulatto Band
- Nadine Lustre (2009–2017; now under Careless)
- Nikki Bacolod (2005–2017)
- Nina (2012–2016; returned to Warner Music Philippines)
- Niño Alejandro
- Nonoy Zuñiga
- Nora Aunor
- Ogie Alcasid (2001–2007; now under Star Music; catalog of his releases now handled by Viva Music Publishing)
- Pixie
- Pilita Corrales
- Pop Girls
- Pops Fernandez (1999–2004)
- Quamo (1994–1995)
- Quickie
- Rachel Alejandro (2004–2006)
- Rachelle Ann Go (2004–2015; now under Cornerstone)
- Ramon "RJ" Jacinto (1998–2007)
- Randy Santiago (1992–1995)
- Rapasia
- Rapiboys
- Rica Peralejo (1999–2002)
- Rico J. Puno (1982–2018; deceased)
- Rivermaya (2001–2007; returned to Sony Music Philippines)
- Rockstar
- Rockstar 2
- Roselle Nava (2004–2014)
- Salbakuta (1990–2006)
- Sampaguita
- Shamrock (2010–2013)
- Sharon Cuneta (1986–2001; now under Star Music)
- The Boss (1994–2000)
- The Company (2003–2015; now under Star Music)
- The Cherries
- The Opera
- Toni Daya (1993–1996)
- Tony Lambino
- Tropical Depression
- Vehnee Saturno
- Victor Wood
- Vina Morales (1988–1994)
- Ugly Kid Joe (Philippine distributor for its album Motel California)
- Viva Mix Club
- Wency Cornejo
- Willie Revillame (2010–2013)
- XLR8 (2010–2012)
- Zaijian Jaranilla (2019)
- Zsa Zsa Padilla (1998–2003; now under Star Music)

== Viva compilations ==
- Viva Collection Forever (1998)
  - The Best of Donna
  - The Best of Love Duets
  - The Best of GCLTHP Band (1996-1998)

== Viva soundtracks ==
- Warat OST (1999)
- Laging Naroon Ka OST (1997)
- Pretty Boy OST (1992)
- Campus Girls OST (1995)
- Bakit Ikaw Pa Rin OST (1990)
- Sala sa Init Sala sa Lamig OST (1993)
- Sana Ay Ikaw na Nga OST (1993)
- It's Cool Bulol OST (1998)
- Forever OST (1994)
- Love Notes The Movie OST (1995)
- Row4 Ang BALIKtoriAns OST (1993)
- Andrew Ford Medina OST
- Okey si Ma'am OST (1995)
- Pangarap Na Bituin (Philippine TV soundtrack) (in collaboration with Star Music)
- T.G.I.S. The Movie Soundtrack (1997)
- Till I Met You OST (2006)
- Muling Umawit ang Puso OST (1995)
- Bridesmaids OST (1996)
- Pangarap Ko Ang Ibigin ka OST
- Darna OST
- S2pid Luv OST
- Weyt A Minit, Kapeng Mainit OST
- Humanap Ka ng Panget OST
- Kahit Konting Pagtingin OST
- Minsan Pa: Kahit Konting Pagtingin 2 OST
- Maging Sino Ka Man OST
- Kailangan Ko'y Ikaw OST
- Megamol OST
- Mahirap Maging Pogi OST
- Ang Boyfriend kong Gamol OST
- Kaputol ng Isang Awit OST
- Miss Kristina Moran: Babaeng Palaban OST (1999)
- Tusong Twosome OST (2001)
- Sa Huling Paghihintay OST (2001)
- Ikaw Ang Miss Universe ng Buhay Ko OST
- Pangako Ikaw lang OST (2001)
- Banyo Queen OST (2001)
- Annie B. OST (2004)
- Masikip sa Dibdib OST (2004)
- Can This Be Love OST (under license of ABS-CBN)
- Bituing Walang Ningning OST (2006; in collaboration with Star Music)
- Paano Kita Iibigin OST (2007)
- Diary Ng Panget OST
- ABNKKBSNPLAko? The Movie OST
- Sid & Aya OST (2018)
- Kahit Ayaw Mo Na OST (2018)
- My Bakit List OST
- Unforgettable OST (2019)
- Indak OST
- Never Not Love You OST

== Gallery ==
The second logo from May 2003 to February 2011.

The third logo from February 2011 to March 2018.

The fourth logo since March 2018.
