= Nora Aunor discography =

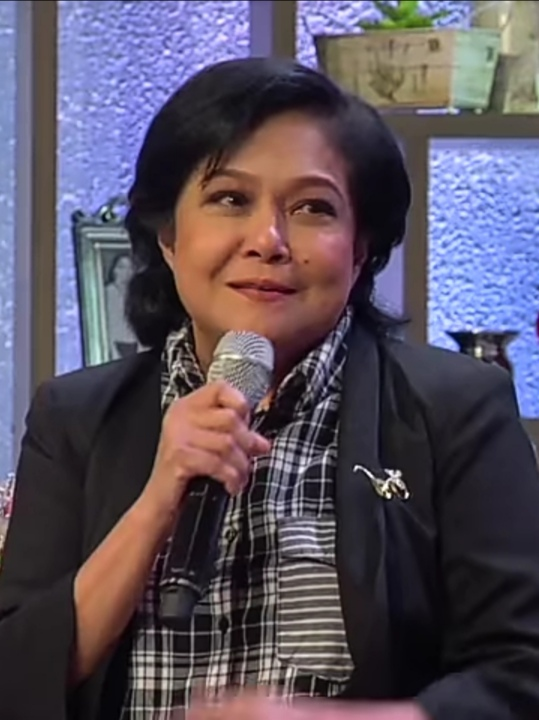
- Aunor in 2017
- Studio albums: 25
- Live albums: 1
- Compilation albums: 12
- Tribute albums: 5
- Singles: 260
- Holiday albums: 3
- Collaboration albums: 5

This is a list of the albums and singles in the discography of Nora Aunor.

Aunor started her career as a singer when she won an amateur singing contest, Tawag ng Tanghalan, in 1967, earning her the nicknames the "Girl with a Golden Voice" and "Princess of Songs."

In 1968, Aunor was contracted by Alpha Records upon the recommendation of singer Carmen Soriano. In her seven years with Alpha Records, Aunor was able to set all-time high record sales which up to this day has not been surpassed. At the height of her popularity as a recording artist in the late 1960's and early 1970's, local records soared up to 60% of national sales, according to Alpha Records Philippines.

She is the artist with the most singles in Philippine recording history (with more than 260). Overall she has recorded more than 500 songs. She has notched more than 30 gold singles, a record in the local music industry. With estimated sales of one million units, Aunor's cover of "Pearly Shells" (1971) is one of the biggest-selling singles in the Philippines ever. She also recorded some 46 hit long-playing albums, and several extended plays.

National Artist for Literature Nick Joaquin once wrote that "The Aunor voice has never been particularly young-girlish. Even at 14, when she pitched it low, the effect was smoky torch. Her teenage fans say that what they like about Nora's voice is that 'it can do anything, wild or sweet.' But it's in the heartbreak songs that the throat really comes through — and the sound is all woman."

National Artist for Music Prof. Andrea Veneracion said about Aunor, "She always has a good voice and over the years, she has developed her own style. Nora in her heyday towered above all other singers not only in terms of popularity but simply because she has a beautiful voice which is what spells the difference even now that many other pop singers have cropped up."

== Albums ==
=== Studio albums ===
List of albums, record label and track listing
Year	Album details	Album cover	Track listing
1968	Nora Aunor Sings: Released: 1968; Label: Alpha Records (Philippines); Formats: LP, cassette, CD, digital download, streaming		The Music Played; Never Shed a Tear; I Love How You Love Me; Open Your Eyes; Tell Me; I Laughed Till I Cried; It's Time to Say Goodbye; I'll Never Find Another You; Come Back to Me; Take My Heart; Silently; Don't Tell My Heart to Stop Loving You
1968	More, More, More of Nora Aunor: Released: 1968; Label: Alpha Records (Philippines); Formats: LP, cassette, CD, digital download, streaming		I Love You So (Robert Medina-Robert Dominic); Just a Bit of Your Love (Robert Medina); Go Away (Danny Subido); My Life is You (Robert Medina-Robert Dominic); I Still Care (Danny Subido); It's in Your Heart (Robert Medina); Help Yourself (Fishman Domida); Crazy About Love (Danny Subido); It's Not Unusual (Mills-Reed); Time After Time (Danny Subido); Gentle On My Mind (John Hartford); Heartache, Heartache, Go Away (Raleigh)
1969	Among My Favorites: Released: 1969; Label: Alpha Records (Philippines); Formats: LP, cassette, CD, digital download, streaming		For a Million Years (Danny Subido); Mistaken (Robert Medina); Loving You (George Canseco); You Don't Love Me Anymore (Robert Medina); I Wonder Why (Robert Medina); Because You're Gone (Robert Medina); Darling (Danny Subido); Dee Da Doo Dee (Robert Medina); Look At Mine (Trent-Hatch); Don't You Believe It (Bacharach-Billiard); I Believe (Graham-Stillman); Mama (Parsons-Turner-Brixie)
1970	The Golden Voice of Nora Aunor: Released: 1970; Label: Alpha Records (Philippines); Formats: LP, cassette, CD, digital download, streaming		Sweetheart, Sweetheart; My Song; I'll Wait for Someone; Mother Song; Heavenly Father; Oh Promise Me; Little Bird; Crazy Feeling; Lucky Girl; All I Own; My Little Boy; The End of Our Love
1970	The Phenomenal Nora Aunor: Released: 1970; Label: Alpha Records (Philippines); Formats: LP, cassette, CD, digital download, streaming		Forever Loving You; Yesterday When I Was Young; I Look at The Rain; Cry Cry No More; This Is How My World Is Made; Am I That Easy to Forget; Tomorrow's Love; I'm So Happy; Two People; Love Time; Better Say Goodbye; It Is No Secret
1970	My Song of Love (credited to Maria Leonora): Released: 1970; Label: Villar Records (Philippines); Formats: LP, cassette, CD		The Sweetest Love I've Ever known; Until the End; My Song of Love; The Kingdom of My Heart; The End of Our Love Affair; You Broke My Heart; Silver Moon; Till Our Love Is Over; I Can Never Forget You; You're Kind of Love; It's You; Come Back
1971	The Song of My Life: Released: 1971; Label: Alpha Records (Philippines); Formats: LP, cassette, CD, digital download, streaming		The Song of My Life; Losing You; My Prayer; Lollipops and Roses; Release Me; The Thing We Did Last Summer; I Just Can't Help Believing; We Miss You; We’ve Only Just Begun; Leaving on a Jet Plane; Now and Then; Me, The Peaceful Heart
1971	Ang Tindera: Released: 1971; Label: Mayon Records (Philippines) (original 1971 release), Alpha Records (Philippines) (1999 CD reissue); Formats: LP, cassette, CD, digital download, streaming		Mariposa (D. Holmsen - A. Fernando); Kusinera (D. Holmsen - E. dela Pena); Despatsadora (D. Holmsen - A. Fernando); Unang Halik (D. Holmsen - A. Fernando); Binatang Makisig (D. Holmsen - A. Fernando); Ang Tindera (D. Holmsen - A. Fernando); Binibining Palengke (D. Holmsen - E. dela Pena); Bulaklak sa Parang (D. Holmsen - A. Fernando); Bata Pa Ako (D. Holmsen); Nagmamahalan (D. Holmsen); Nagbalik Na Lumipas (D. Holmsen - E. dela Pena); Sa Aming Muling Pagkikita (D. Holmsen - E. dela Pena)
1971	Superstar: Released: 1971; Label: Alpha Records (Philippines); Formats: LP, cassette, CD, digital download, streaming		Superstar; Let Me Be with You; All Alone Am I; Loss of Love; I Play and Sing; In My Life; And I Love You So; Trains and Boats and Planes; Time in Love; Rose Garden; I Left My Heart in San Francisco; No One Will Ever Know
1971	Portrait of... Nora Aunor: Released: 1971; Label: Alpha Records (Philippines); Formats: LP, cassette, CD, digital download, streaming		Waiting For You; True Picture; You Are; Dio Como Ti Amo; My Beloved; Prisoner Of My Eyes; Three Good Reasons; Mother Dear; Missing You; Dream Boy; Around the World; Theme for a New Love
1971	The Golden Hits of Nora Aunor: Released: 1971; Label: Alpha Records (Philippines); Formats: LP, cassette, CD, digital download, streaming		Love Story; Missing You; Forever Loving You; I Believe; For a Million Years; Mother Song; Waiting For You; My Song; Mama; I Love You So; Mistaken; Go Away
1971	Blue Hawaii: Released: 1971; Label: Alpha Records (Philippines); Formats: LP, cassette, CD, digital download, streaming		Blue Hawaii; Tiny Bubbles; Can't Help Falling in Love; Hawaiian Wedding Songs; Little Grass Shack; To You Sweetheart, Aloha; Pearly Shells; Beyond the Reef; Moonlight Swim; Little Brown Gal; Cupid; Aloha Oe
1971	Dream Come True (with Tirso Cruz III): Released: 1971; Label: Vicor Records (Philippines); Formats: LP, cassette		Together; Lorelie; You're My First Love; Just You; Hey Little Girl; Goin' Out Of My Head; Together Again; Just A Little Bit Of Your Love; There's Just Forever; Alphabet Song; Everybody's Talkin'; Moonlight Becomes You
1972	Mga Awiting Pilipino: Released: 1972; Label: Alpha Records (Philippines), Mayon Records (Philippines); Formats: LP, cassette, CD, digital download, streaming		Leron Leron Sinta; Sitsiritsit; Sinisinta Kita; Carinosa (Levi Celerio); Paru-parong Bukid; Atin Cu Pung Singsing; Sarungbanggi; Dandansoy; Ay Ay Kalisud (L. Celerio - R. Alinsud); Walay Angay; Ti Ayat Ti Maysa Nga Ubing; Kung Maging Ulila
1972	Queen of Songs: Released: 1972; Label: Alpha Records (Philippines); Formats: LP, cassette, CD, digital download, streaming		A Poor Man's Roses; You And I; The Wedding; Sayonara; Los Siento Mucho; Love Me with All of Your Heart; Sweet Seasons; I'd Like to Teach The World to Sing; Everybody's Somebody's Fool; Here's My Happiness; Who's Sorry Now; There's Always Me
1972	At Home with Nora: Released: 1972; Label: Alpha Records (Philippines); Formats: LP, cassette, CD, digital download, streaming		This Masquerade; Never Never Never; To the Aisle; May Each Day; In My Little Corner of the World; Banjo Boy; Solitaire; Mam'd Know What to Do; Shelter; Mr. Loveman; Promise Me a Rose; Don't Hide Your Love
1972	Mga Awitin ng Puso: Released: 1972; Label: Alpha Records (Philippines), Mayon Records (Philippines); Formats: LP, cassette, CD, digital download, streaming		Ikaw (M. Velarde Jr.-D. Santiago); Buhat (M. Velarde Jr.-D. Santiago); Dahil sa Iyo (M. Velarde Jr.-D. Santiago); Ang Mahal Ko'y Ikaw (Jerry Brandy); Ikaw ay Akin (M. Velarde Jr.-D. Santiago); Ipagdarasal Kita (Jerry Brandy); Minamahal Kita (M. Velarde Jr.-D. Santiago); Tapat na Pag-ibig; Pag-ibig Ikaw ang May Sala (Jerry Brandy); Lihim Kitang Mahal (Ibarra Samson); Pangako ng Puso (D. Holmsen-A. Fernando); Marupok Na Sumpa (Philip Maninang)
1972	Be Gentle: Released: 1972; Label: Alpha Records (Philippines); Formats: LP, cassette, CD, digital download, streaming		Be Gentle (Danny Holmsen); Alone Again (Naturally) (G. Sullivan); Oh My Love (J. Lennon-Y. Ono); You Are Everything (T. Bell-L. Creed); Anticipation (C. Simon); I Made A Mistake (Danny Holmsen); Everyday Of My Life (R. Morgan-B. Morgan); Go My Heart (Danny Holmsen); What's The Use Of Loving You (D. Holmsen-R. Garcia); And God Smiled At Me (Danny Holmsen); Gift Of Love (D. Holmsen); Mr. Cloud (G. Fletcher-D. Flett)
1972	Nora Today: Released: 1972; Label: Alpha Records (Philippines); Formats: LP, cassette, CD, digital download, streaming		A Promise of Love (C. Sweeny-M. Charlap); So Lucky (Billy Owen); The Impossible Dream (J. Darlon-M. Leigh); Sing (Joe Raposo); A Love Song (C. Gierard - J. Johnston); Bless the Beast and the Children (B. De Vorzon - T. Botkin Jr.); Song Without End (Petula Clark); Adios My Love (Newell - Hadjidakis); I'd Love You to Want Me (Lobo); I've Found Someone of My Own (F. Robinson); Teardrop on Teardrop (M. Murray - P. Callander); I Like Your Music (Sonny Curtis)
1974	Let Me Try Again: Released: 1974; Label: Alpha Records (Philippines); Formats: LP, cassette, CD, digital download, streaming		Let Me Try Again; Sealed With a Kiss; Maybe This Year; I'll Be Seeing You; Song I'd Like to Sing; I'm Coming Home; The Lord's Prayer; Since You Went Away; My Sweet Baby; All of My Life; Make It Easy for Me; Here Today and Gone Tomorrow
1974	Lady Guy: Released: 1974; Label: NV Records (Philippines); Formats: LP, cassette		Who Broke Your Heart and Made You Write That Song; Laughter In The Rain; I Honestly Love You; Someday I'll Be With You; My World; The Way We Were; Sweet Memories; Hand In Hand With Love; Lullaby For Lovers; You Will Be My Music; He's All I Got; Sometimes I Wonder Why I Stay With You
1975	Nora Aunor: Noon at Ngayon: Released: 1975; Label: Plaka Pilipino (Philippines); Formats: LP, cassette		Kapantay ay Langit; Hinahanap Kita; Ang Daigdig Ko'y Ikaw; Bakit Mo Nilimot; Pag-ibig Naming Bawal; Superstar ng Buhay Ko; Sige Na Naman, Bati Na Tayo; Puppy Love; Sweet Na Sweet; High School Ring; Do I Love You?
1975	In Love (with Christopher de Leon): Released: 1975; Label: Vicor Records (Philippines); Formats: LP, cassette		Together Forever; Take Away the Sunshine; Smile Again; Morning Side lf The Mountain; All in Love Is Fair; Bagyo Kang Talaga; I Got Caught Dancing Again; Love Me For a Reason; The Trouble with Hello is Goodbye; Happy Man; Hello Goodnight Goodbye; I'm Leaving It (All) Up to You
1976	Iniibig Kita: Released: 1976; Label: Plaka Pilipino (Philippines); Formats: LP, cassette		Iniibig Kita; Hindi Na Ako Mag-iisa (I Have You); Natuturuan ang Puso; Minsan Lang (Once Is Not Enough); Kwintas Ng Pag-ibig; Naghihintay Ang Puso Ko (Ilang-ilang); Hindi Magawang Limutin Ka (My World Keeps Getting Smaller Everyday); Dahil Sa Pangarap (I Need to Be In Love); Kay Hirap Ng Umibig; Pag-ibig ang Lunas; Awit Kay Inay (Mother Song)
1977	Ms. Nora Aunor: Released: 1977; Label: Pioneer Records (Philippines); Formats: LP, cassette		Minamahal Kita (What I Did For Love); Hiram Na Langit; Daigdig Ng Pangarap (feat. Rico J. Puno); Ang Pipit; Nag-Iisa; Ito Kaya Ay Pag-ibig? (Send in the Clowns); Sa Piling Ko (Lying In My Arms); Bakit (feat. Rico J. Puno); Kailan Ko Kakamtin? (Folk Song); Kahit Na Mag-Isa (Alone Again & Free); Paalam Na Sinta
1979	Handog: Released: 1979; Label: Canary Records (Philippines); Formats: LP, cassette, CD		Handog (Florante); Laging Umiibig Sa'yo (B. Gil); Bakit Mahal Kita (M. de la Paz); Gulong Ng Palad (F. Lai); Bigo Sa Pag-ibig (M. Mallillin Jr.); Pag-ibig Mo Tanging Ako (B. Gil); Ngayong Kapiling Na Kita (N. Caraan); Di Mo Ba Nadarama (N. Caraan); Hanggang Kailan (N. Caraan); Walang Ibang Mahal (F. Areza)
1991	The Power of Love: Released: 1991; Label: Big Records (Philippines); Formats: Cassette, CD		
1994	Superstar Ng Buhay Ko: Released: 1994; Label: Vicor Music (Philippines); Formats: Cassette, CD, digital download, streaming		Superstar Ng Buhay Ko; Hindi Magawang Limutin Ka (My World Keeps Getting Smaller Everyday); It's Only Love; The Trouble With Hello Is Goodbye; All In Love Is Fair; Kastilyong Buhangin; Kapantay Ay Langit; Together Again; Sige Na Naman, Bati Na Tayo; Minamahal Kita (What I Did For Love); Torn Between Two Lovers; Puppy Love; Goin' Out Of My Head; Maria Leonora Theresa (performed by Tirso Cruz III)
1994	Langit Pala ang Umibig (with Freddie Aguilar): Released: 1994; Label: Aguilar Music (Philippines); Formats: LP, cassette, CD, digital download, streaming		Bulung-bulungan; Pangarap Ka; Langit Pala ang Umibig; Ikaw Lamang; Maliit Man sa Tingin; Itay; Ituloy ang Laban; Hanggang Wakas
1999	Thanks for Being a Friend: Released: 1999; Label: Alpha Records (Philippines); Formats: Cassette, CD, digital download, streaming		Born to Cry (duet with Eddie Peregrina); Thanks for Being a Friend; Hindi Ako Iiyak; Take My Heart; Waiting for You; Help Yourself; Silently; I Almost Called Your Name; Tell Me; I Laughed 'Til I Cried; Rose Garden; It's Not Unusual
2009	Habang Panahon: Released: 2009; Label: HiFi Productions (US); Formats: CD, digital download, streaming		Habang Panahon (B. Dasig); Pangako (B. Dasig); Starlight (B. Dasig-O. Quesada); Kailan (B. Dasig); Kung (O. Quesada); Ganyan Nga Ba? (B. Dasig); Friends (B. Dasig-O. Quesada); Ligaya (C. Bendebel); Pasko (B. Dasig); Sa Iyo Pa Rin (B. Dasig-O. Quesada)

=== Extended plays ===
Aunor recorded and released more than 100 EPs; the following is a partial list.

List of albums, record label and track listing
Year	Album details	Label	Track listing
1967	Released: 1967; Formats: EP	Citation Records (Philippines)	Moonlight Becomes You (Van Heusen, Burke); There's Just Forever
1967	Released: 1967; Formats: EP	Jasper Records Records (Philippines)	No Return, No Exchange; You are My First Love
1972	Nora: Released: 1972; Formats: EP	Alpha Records Corporation (Philippines)	Lovetime (Canseco–Medina); Better Say Goodbye (Medina-Canseco); Am I That Easy To Forget (Below-Stevenson); It Is No Secret (Stuart Hamblen)

=== Soundtrack albums ===
List of albums, record label and track listing
Year	Album details	Label	Track listing
1979	Annie Batungbakal: Studio album; Released: 1979; Formats: CD	Wea Records	Annie Batungbakal (featured by Hotdog (band)); Kulang; Kaniya-Kaniyang Hilig; Robot; Langit Na Naman; Bongga ka, Day; Meowww; Hindi na Magbabago; Ikaw Na Nga; Annie Batungbakal (Reprise)
1980	Bongga Ka Day: Studio album; Released: 1980; Formats: CD; Label: WEA Records, Universal Records (Philippines)		Welcome To My Life (with Lloyd Samartino); Ikaw Pa Rin; Pag-ibig; Macho (with Hotdog); Bongga Ka Day (with Hotdog); Fiesta; Eto Kami, Mr. Talent Scout; Bongga Ka Day (Love Theme)
1985	Till We Meet Again: Studio album; Released: 1985; Formats: CD		Till We Meet Again (Nora Aunor); Ikaw Pa Rin (Nora Aunor); 'Di Na Natuto (Tirso Cruz III); Pag-ibig (Nora Aunor); Together Again (Nora Aunor); Hindi Na Magbabago (Nora Aunor); Baby I Need Your Loving (Nora Aunor); Suddenly (Tirso Cruz III); Into The Groove (Nora Aunor)
1995	Muling Umawit ang Puso: Studio album; Released: December 1995; Formats: CD; Label: Viva Records (Philippines)		Muling Umawit Ang Puso (Nora Aunor); Pangarap Na Bituin (?); Never Say Goodbye (Nora Aunor); Muling Umawit Ang Puso (with ?)

=== Compilation albums ===
List of albums, record label and track listing
Year	Album details	Label	Track listing
1994	Superstar ng Buhay Ko: Compilation album; Released: 1994; Formats: CD; Label: Vicor Music Corporation (Philippines)		Superstar ng Buhay Ko; Hindi Magawang Limutin Ka; It's Only Love; The trouble with Hello is Goodbye; All in Love is Fair; Kastilyong Buhangin; Kapantay ay Langit; Together Again; Sige na naman, Bati na Tayo; Minamahal Kita (What I did for Love); Torn Between Two Lovers; Puppy Love; Goin Out of my Head; Maria Leonora Theresa (bonus track by Tirso Cruz III)
1999	Thank You for Being a Friend: Compilation album; Released: 1999; Formats: CD; Label: Alpha Records Corporation (Philippines)		Born To Cry (duet with Eddie Peregrina); Thank For Being A Friend; Hindi Ako Iiyak; Take My Heart; Waiting For You; Help Yourself; Silently; I Almost Called Your Name; Tell Me; I Laughed ‘Till I Cried; Rose Garden; It's Not Unusual
2006	Superstar: Nora Aunor (Vicor 40th Anniversary Special) CD 1: Compilation album; Released: 2006; Formats: CD; Label: Vicor Music Corporation (Philippines)		Who Broke Your Heart and Made You Write That Song; Laughter in the Rain; I Honestly Love You; Someday I'll Be With You; My World; The Way We Were; Sweet Memories; Hand in Hand with Love; Lullaby for Lovers; You Will Be My Music; He's All I Got; Sometimes I Wonder Why I Stayed With You; Take Away the Sunshine; All In Love is Fair; I Got Caught Dancing Again; The Trouble with Hello is Goodbye; Hello Goodnight Goodbye; You're My First Love; There's Just Forever; Goin' Out of my Head; Moonlight Becomes You; It's Only Love; Together Again (Duet with Tirso Cruz III); Torn Between Two Lovers
2006	Superstar: Nora Aunor (Vicor 40th Anniversary Special) CD 2: Compilation album; Released: 2006; Formats: CD; Label: Vicor Music Corporation (Philippines)		Superstar ng Buhay Ko; Sige Naman Bati na Tayo; Puppy Love; Sweet na Sweet; High School Ring; Do I Love You; Kapantay ay Langit; Hinahanap Kita; Ang Daigdig Ko'y Ikaw; Bakit Mo Nilimot; Pag-ibig Naming Bawal; Iniibig Kita; Hindi na Ako Mag-Iisa; Natuturuan ang Puso; Minsan Lang; Naghihintay ang Puso Ko; Hindi Magawing Limutin Ka
2006	Superstar: Nora Aunor (Vicor 40th Anniversary Special) CD 3: Compilation album; Released: 2006; Formats: CD; Label: Vicor Music Corporation (Philippines)		Minahal Kita; Hiram na Langit; Daigdig ng Pangarap (Duet with Rico J. Puno); Ang Pipit; Kahit na Nag-Iisa; Ito Kaya ay Pag-ibig; Sa Piling Mo; Kailan Ko Kakamtin; Dahil sa Pangarap; Paalam na Sinta; Kastilyong Buhangin; Kwintas ng Pag-ibig; Kay Hirap ng Umibig; Luha at Halaklak; Pag-ibig ang Lunas; Awit Kay Inay
2008	Nora Aunor - Greatest Hits Volume 1: Compilation album; Released: 2008; Formats: CD; Label: Alpha Records Corporation (Philippines)		Mama; Mother Song; Mother Dear; Mama'd Know What Tod Do; I Believe; Heavenly Father; May Each Day; To The Aisle; The Wedding; My Prayer; Dio Como Ti Amo; Missing You; Let Me Be With You; I'll Be Seeing You; A Promise Of Love; Losing You; Maybe This Year; Sealed With A Kiss; There's Always Me; Love Me With All Your Heart; The Impossible Dream; True Picture; Who's Sorry Now; I Love How You Love Me; All Alone Am I
2008	Nora Aunor - Greatest Hits Volume 2: Compilation album; Released: 2008; Formats: CD; Label: Alpha Records Corporation (Philippines)		Tiny Bubbles; Pearly Shells; Blue Hawaii; Little Grass Shack; Little Brown Gal; Moonlight Swim; Beyond The Reef; Hawaiian Wedding Song; To You Sweetheart Aloha; Can't Help Falling In Love; Aloha Oe; Around The World; Lollipops And Roses; The Thing We Did Last Summer; Yesterday When I Was Young; The Music Played; Silently; I'll Never Find Another You; Be Gentle; Sweetheart Sweetheart; You Are; Gift Of Love; And God Smiled At Me; In My Life; It's Time To Say Goodbye
2008	Nora Aunor - Greatest Hits Volume 3: Compilation album; Released: 2008; Formats: CD; Label: Alpha Records Corporation (Philippines)		Sing; Banjo Boy; I'd Like To Teach The World; Rose Garden; Help Yourself; It's Not Unusual; Sweet Seasons; Take My Heart; I Just Can't Help Believing; I Play And Sing; This Masquerade; Promise Me A Rose; Time After Time; Shelter; Leaving On A Jet Plane
	Mga Awiting Sariling Atin Vol. 1: Compilation album; Released: Formats: CD; Label: Alpha Records Corporation (Philippines)		Unang Halik; Bata Pa Ako; Bulaklak Sa Parang; Mariposa; Ang Tindera; Dampa; Kusinera; Carinosa; Sinisinta Kita; Halina Sa BUkid; Paru-Parung Bukid; Atin Cu Pung Singsing; Sarung Banggi; Dandansoy; Leron Leron Sinta; Sitsiritsit; Pulang Tandang; O...Dalaga Sa Bayan Ko; Gulong Ng Palad; Palengke Queen; Despatsadora; Binibining Palengke
	Mga Awiting Sariling Atin Vol. 2: Compilation album; Released: Formats: CD; Label: Alpha Records Corporation (Philippines)		Marupok Na Sumpa; Kung Maging Ulila; Tapat Na Pag-ibig; Lihim Kitang Mahal; Pangako Ng Puso; Pag-ibig Ikaw Ang May Sala; Ay Ay Kalisud; Walay Angay; Ikaw; Buhat; Dahil Sa Iyo; Ang Mahal Ko'y Ikaw; Ikaw Ay Akin; Ipagdarasal Kita; Minamahal Kita; Nagmamahalan; Nagbalik Na Lumipas; Sa Aming Muling Pagkikita; Ti Ayat Ti Meysa Nga Ubing; Dukha; Binatang Makisig; Hindi Ako Iiyak
	Christmas Songs Compilation Vol. 1: Compilation album; Released: Formats: CD	Alpha Records Corporation (Philippines)	Santa Claus Is Coming To Town; Merry Christmas Polka; Rudolph The Red Nosed Reindeer; Frosty The Snowman; Rockin' Around The Xmas Tree; Jingle Bell Rock; Christmas Don't Be Late; Here Comes Santa Claus; Jingle Bells; Mister Santa; Mrs. Santa Claus; I Don't Intend; Caroling, Caroling; Twelve Days Of Christmas
	Christmas Songs Compilation Vol. 2: Compilation album; Released: Formats: CD	Alpha Records Corporation (Philippines)	Merry Christmas Darling; The Christmas Song; O Holy Night; White Christmas; Christmas Story; You're All I Want For Xmas; O Little Town Of Bethlehem; O Come All Ye Faithful; I'll be Home For Christmas; Mary's Boy Child; Have Yourself A Merry Little Christmas; Little Christmas Tree; Hark The Herald Angels Sing; Blue Christmas

=== Holiday albums ===
List of albums, label and track listing
Year	Album details	Track listing
1969	Christmas with Nora Aunor: Released: 1969; Label: Alpha Records (Philippines); Formats: LP, cassette, CD, digital download, streaming	Christmas Story; O Holy Night; White Christmas; I Saw Mommy Kissing Santa Claus; You're All I Want for Christmas; Silent Night; Jingle Bells; Mamacita; Jingle Bell Rock; Silver Bells; Whispering Hope; Little Christmas Tree
1972	Christmas Songs: Released: 1972; Label: Alpha Records (Philippines); Formats: LP, cassette, CD, digital download, streaming	A Christmas Gift; I'll Be Home for Christmas; Merry Christmas Darling; O Little Town of Bethlehem; O Come All Ye Faithful; The Christmas Song; Mrs. Santa Claus; Frosty the Snowman; Rudolph, the Red Nosed Reindeer; Merry Christmas Polka; Little Drummer Boy; Blue Christmas
1973	Season's Greetings: Released: 1973; Label: Alpha Records (Philippines); Formats: LP, cassette, CD, digital download, streaming	Santa Claus Is Coming To Town; I Don't Intend; Rockin' Around The Christmas Tree; Here Comes Santa Claus; Twelve Days Of Christmas; Christmas Alphabet; Hark The Herald Angels Sing; Caroling Caroling; Have Yourself A Merry Little Christmas; Mister Santa; Christmas Don't Be Late; Mary's Boy Child

=== Live albums ===
List of albums, record label and track listing
Year	Album details	Label	Track listing
1991	Handog ni Guy Live: Live Album; Released: 1991, re-issued: 2011; Formats: CS, CD; Label: WEA Records (Philippines); Re-issued by: Universal Records (Philippines); Certification: PARI: Gold		People; Nora Aunor hits Medley; Unchained Melody; I'm yours Baby Tonight; Movie Theme Song Medley; Paano Ba Maging Isang Ina? (Andrea Theme Song); Pinoy Rock Medley; What Now My Love; Wind Beneath My Wings; Greatest Performance Medley; Finale Medley

=== Collaboration albums ===
List of albums, record label and track listing
Year	Album details	Label	Track listing
1970	Pledging My Love (with Manny de Leon): Studio album; Released: 1970; Formats: LP; Label: Alpha Records Corporation (Philippines)		Young Lovers; All I have to Do is Dream; Melody of Love; True Love; Let Me Stay with You; Pleading My Love; Let Them Talk; Bye, bye Love; Side by Side; Devoted to You; Let it be Me; I Will Always Love You
1971	Dream Come True (with Tirso Cruz III): Studio album; Released: 1971; Formats: LP, re-released: CD; Label: Vicor Music Corporation (Philippines)		Together; Lorelie; You're my First Love; Just You; Hey Little Girl; Goin out of My Mind; Together Again; Just a Little Bit of your Love; There's Just Forever; Alphabeth Song; Everybody's Talking; Moonlight Becomes You
	In Love (with Christopher de Leon): Studio album; Released: Formats: LP, re-released: CD; Label: Vicor Music Corporation (Philippines)		Together Forever (Duet); Take Away The Sunshine (Nora); Smile Please (Boyet); Morning Side of the Mountain (Duet); All In Love Is Fair (Nora); Bagyo Kang Talaga (Boyet); I Got Caught Dancing Again (Nora); Love Me For A Reason (Boyet); The Trouble With Hello is Goodbye (Nora); Happy Man (Boyet); Hello, Goodnight, Goodbye (Nora); I'm Leaving It All Up To You (Duet)
1978	Mahal (with Tirso Cruz III): Studio album; Released: 1978; Formats: LP, re-released: CD	Vicor Music Corporation (Philippines)	Buhay ko Karugtong ng Buhay Mo (Duet); Pagsikat Ng Araw (Nora); Kailan Pa Kaya (Tirso); Paniwalaan (Duet); Walang Kapantay (Nora); Magpakailanman, Ikaw at Ako (Duet); Higpit ng Yakap (Nora); Ibigin Mo Ako (Tirso); Pangarap ng Pagibig (Duet); You're my Everything (Tirso)
1979	Ms. Nora Aunor (with Rico J. Puno): Studio album; Released: Formats: LP, re-released: CD; Label: Vicor Music Corporation (Philippines)		Minahal Kita (What I Did For Love); Hiram Na Langit; Daigdig ng Pangarap (Duet with Rico J. Puno); Ang Pipit; Kahit na Nag-iisa (Alone Again & Free); Ito Kaya Ay Pag-ibig (Send in the Clowns); Sa Piling Mo (Lying in my Arms); Kailan Ko Kakamtin; Paalam na Sinta; Bakit - Rico J. Puno

== Singles ==
=== Notable singles ===
Aunor recorded over 260 singles, the most in Philippine music history; the following is a list of some of her most notable songs.

Year	Song	Notes
	"Moonlight Becomes You"	This is her winning piece at the Tawag ng Tanghalan Amateur singing contest.
	"Pearly Shells"	With estimated sales of one million units, Nora's cover of "Pearly Shells" (1971) is one of the biggest-selling singles in the Philippines ever.
	"Handog"	A Florante (Filipino singer-songwriter) original but was made famous by Nora Aunor.
	"People"	A song popularized in the movie musical Funny Girl.
	"Yesterday When I was Young"	This single became a massive hit in the Philippines.
	"Sulat ni Inay"	This single was released to capitalize on Nora's world tour of the stage play of DH (Domestic Helper).

=== Movie, TV show and stage play theme songs ===
Year	Song	Movie/TV show/play
1972	"And God Smiled at Me"	From the movie And God Smiled at Me
1972	"Sarung Banggi"	From the movie Sarung Banggi; The movie starred Boots Anson-Roa
1973	"Sa Aming Muling Pagkikita"	From the movie Sa Aming Muling Pagkikita; This is a Romeo Vasquez - Amalia Fuentes movie.
1974	"I'm Always Chasing Rainbows"	From the movie Fe, Esperanza, Caridad
1975	"Batu-Bato sa Langit"	From the movie Batu-bato sa Langit: Ang Tamaa'y Huwag Magagalit
1976	"Isang Halik, Isang Tinik"	From the movie Mrs. Teresa Abad, Ako po si Bing
1979	"Hindi na Magbabago"	From the movie Annie Batungbakal
1980	"Kastilyong Buhangin"	From the movie Kastilyong Buhangin
1981	"Lungkot at Tawa" (with ReyCard Duet)	From the movie Ibalik ang Swerti
1982	"Hiwaga ng Pag-ibig"	From the movie Ang T-bird at Ako
1984	"May Bukas Pang Muli"	From the movie Condemned
1985	"Beloved"	From the movie Beloved
1985	"Till We Meet Again" (duet with Tirso Cruz III)	From the movie Till We Meet Again
1985	"I Can't Stop Loving You" (duet with Tirso Cruz III)	From the movie I Can't Stop Loving You
1989	"Bilangin ko ang mga Bituin sa Langit"	From the movie Bilangin ang mga Bituin sa Langit
1990	"Paano Ba Maging Isang Ina?"	From the movie Andrea, Paano Ba ang Maging Isang Ina?
1991	"Hindi Sapat ang Lahat"	From the movie Ang Totoong Buhay ni Pacita M.
1993	"Sulat ni Inay"	From the stage play D.H.
1993	"Ako ang iyong Inay"	From the movie Inay
1995	"Kahit na Konting Awa"	From the movie The Flor Contemplacion Story
1995	"Muling Umawit ang Puso"	From the movie Muling Umawit ang Puso
1999	"Bangon Na, Kilos Na!"	
2002	"Langit na Bituin"	From the drama series Bituin

== Other appearances ==
=== As a performer on a compilation album ===
Year	Song	Label	Album
	"Dahil Sa Iyo"	Alpha Records (Philippines)	The Best of Immortal Pilipino Songs
	"Halina Sa Bukid"	Alpha Records (Philippines)	Sinisinta Kita
	"Bulaklak Sa Parang"	Alpha Records (Philippines)	Sinisinta Kita
	"Sinisinta Kita"	Alpha Records (Philippines)	Sinisinta Kita
	"Mariposa"	Alpha Records (Philippines)	Sinisinta Kita
	"Buhat"	Alpha Records (Philippines)	The Best of Immortal Pilipino Songs Volume 2
	"Ang Pipit"	Alpha Records (Philippines)	The Best of Immortal Pilipino Songs Volume 2
	"Buhat"	Alpha Records (Philippines)	Mga Himig ng Pag-Ibig
	"Dahil sa Iyo"	Alpha Records (Philippines)	Mga Himig ng Pag-Ibig
	"Ikaw ay Akin"	Alpha Records (Philippines)	Mga Himig ng Pag-Ibig
	"Pag-ibig ang Lunas"	Mayon Records (Philippines)	Sariling Atin
	"Halina sa Bukid"	Mayon Records (Philippines)	Sariling Atin
1972	"Biyaya ng Pasko"	Mayon Records (Philippines)	Mga Awiting Pamasko
1972	"Pasko ay Ipagdiwang"	Mayon Records (Philippines)	Mga Awiting Pamasko
1983	"Biyaya ng Pasko"	Alpha Records (Philippines)	Maligayang Pasko at Masaganang Bagong Taon
1988	"Dandansoy"	Kinaham Records (Philippines)	Mga Piniling Awit Nga Walay Kamatayon: Released: March 14, 1988
1996	"Kahit na Konting Awa"	Viva Records (Philippines)	Viva Films: Great Movie Themes
1996	"Muling Umawit ang Puso"	Viva Records (Philippines)	Viva Films: Great Movie Themes
1998	"Handog"	OctoArts-EMI (Philippines)	25 Great Songs, 25 Great Artists
2001	"Heal Our Land"	Viva Records (Philippines)	Edsa: Ikalawang Yugto
2001	"Aking Mahal"	Stallion Records (Saudi Arabia), POPPSINC (Philippines), Artistika Records (Philippines)	AWIT ABROAD – Para sa Inyo, OFW ng Buong Mundo
2001	"Dahil Sa'yo"	Alpha Records (Philippines)	The Best of Kundiman Songs Volume 2 (Golden Collection Series): Released: June 5, 2001
2001	"Buhat"	Alpha Records (Philippines)	The Best of Kundiman Songs Volume 2 (Golden Collection Series): Released: June 5, 2001
2001	"Paru-parong Bukid"	Alpha Records (Philippines)	Favorite Philippine Folk Songs (Golden Collection Series): Released: October 2, 2001
2001	"Leron Leron Sinta"	Alpha Records (Philippines)	Favorite Philippine Folk Songs (Golden Collection Series): Released: October 2, 2001
2005	"Kahit na Konting Awa"	Viva Records (Philippines)	Bagong Bayani: Alay Kay Flor: Released: August 2, 2005
2005	"Dito Ba?"	Viva Records (Philippines)	Bagong Bayani: Alay Kay Flor: Released: August 2, 2005
2007	"The Song of My Life"	Alpha Music (Philippines)	Alpha Music OPM Hits Volume 2

=== As a guest performer in an album ===
Year	Song	Label	Album
1970	"Because" (duet with Manny de Leon)	Alpha Records (Philippines)	Tell Her
1971	"Just You" (duet with Tirso Cruz III)	Vicor Records (Philippines)	Tirso Cruz III
1971	"Together" (duet with Tirso Cruz III)	Vicor Records (Philippines)	Tirso Cruz III
1971	"Sweetheart" (duet with Tirso Cruz III)	Vicor Records (Philippines)	Tirso Cruz III

=== As a performer in an advertisement jingle and more ===
Year	Song	Advertisement/others
1969	"Great smiles come from Colgate"	TV advertisement for Colgate toothpaste
1969	"It's the Real Thing"	TV/radio advertisement for Coca-Cola
1971	"Aksyon Agad, Enrile"	Election campaign jingle for Juan Ponce Enrile running for Senate
1971	"Aren't you glad you use Dial?"	TV advertisement for Dial soap
1977	"Security is for Everyone"	Commercial jingle for Security Bank
1978	"Com'on com'on and have Pepsi day"	Commercial jingle for Pepsi
1980s	"You're the One"	Commercial jingle for Pepsi

== Music awards and recognition ==
=== Awit Awards ===
Year	Nominated work	Category	Result
1998		Dangal ng Musikang Pilipino - Lifetime Achievement Award	Won
1996	"Kahit na Konting Awa"	Best Interpreter of Movie Theme Song	Won
1971	The Phenomenal Nora Aunor	Album of the Year	Won
1971		Best Female Singer (English)	Won
1970		Best Female Singer (English)	Won
1969		Best New Recording Artist	Won

- The first award ceremony was organized by the Awit Awards Executive Committee. After that, the Philippine Academy of Recording Arts and Sciences (PARAS) took charge for the next two years. Since 1989, it has been spearheaded by PARI (the Philippine Association of the Record Industry, Inc.)

=== Philippine Recording Distributors Association (PREDA) ===
Year	Nominated work	Category	Result
1973		Top Selling Records, Female Singer of the Year, Tagalog Version	Won
1973		Top Selling Records, Female Singer of the Year, English Version	Won
1971		Female Singer of the Year	Won
1969		Best New Recording Artist of the Year	Won

=== Star Awards for Music (Philippine Movie Press Club) ===
Year	Nominated work	Category	Result
2011		Lifetime Achievement Award	Won
2011		One of 15 OPM Icons	Won

=== Organisasyon ng Pilipinong Mang-aawit (OPM) ===
Year	Nominated work	Category	Result
2011		Dangal ng OPM Award	Won

ref:

=== Katha Award ===
Year	Nominated work	Category	Result
1995	"Maliit Man sa Tingin"	Best Country Folk Singer	Won

== See also ==
- List of awards and nominations received by Nora Aunor
- Honorific nicknames in popular music
