= Handog ni Guy Live =

Live album by Nora Aunor
- Released: 1991
- Recorded: May 18, 1991
- Venues: Araneta Coliseum, Philippines
- Studio: Audio Captain Recording Studios
- Genres: OPM; pop; adult contemporary; jazz
- Length: 68:57
- Label: WEA/Universal

Nora Aunor chronology
The Power of Love (1991)	Handog ni Guy Live (1991)	Langit Pala ang Umibig (1994)

Singles from Handog ni Guy Live
- 1. "People" Released: 1991; 2. "Andrea Theme Song" Released: 1991

Handog ni Guy Live is the first and only live album by Filipino singer-actress Nora Aunor, released in the Philippines in 1991, by WEA Records on double LP, double cassette and single CD formats and later on streaming and digital download. In celebration of its 20th anniversary, Universal Records re-issued Handog ni Guy Live album in 2011.

This album was recorded live from Aunor's first major concert at the Araneta Coliseum on May 18, 1991, a few days before her 38th birthday. Her guests include Gary Valenciano, Mon Faustino, The Hotlegs, The Operas and many more.

== Background ==
The live album includes the songs that made popular by Aunor in the Philippines, like "People" by Barbra Streisand and "Handog" by Florante. The live album also includes "Movie Theme Song Medley" and "Pinoy Rock Medley".

== Track listing ==
Handog ni Guy Live track listing
No.	Title	Writer(s)	Length
1.	"People"	Jule Styne (composer); Bob Merrill (lyricist)	3:39
2.	"Nora Aunor Hits Medley ^{1}"	Charles Aznavour; Mike Hawker; Udo Jürgens; Joachim Fuchsberger; Jimmy Van Heusen (composer); Johnny Burke (lyricist); Arthur Schwartz (composer); Howard Dietz (lyricist); Les Reed; Geoff Stephens	7:51
3.	"Unchained Melody"	Alex North; Hy Zaret	3:55
4.	"I'm Your Baby Tonight"	L.A. Reid; Babyface	5:00
5.	"Movie Theme Song Medley ^{2}"	George Canseco; Rey Valera; Gary Valenciano; Angeli Pangilinan-Valenciano	4:10
6.	"Andrea Theme Song"	Mon Faustino	4:59
7.	"Pinoy Rock Medley ^{3}" (with Gary Valenciano)	Freddie Aguilar; Gary Perez; Ernie Palacio; Mike Hanopol; Randy Santiago	7:23
8.	"What Now My Love"	Gilbert Bécaud; Pierre Delanoë; Carl Sigman	5:07
9.	"Wind Beneath My Wings"	Jeff Silbar; Larry Henley	4:17
10.	"Greatest Performance Medley ^{4}"	Eric Carmen; Sergei Rachmaninoff; Freddie Perren; Dino Fekaris; Roberto Sanchez; Oscar Anderle; Robert Allen; Bruno Canfora; Antonio Amurri; Norman Newell	10:19
11.	"Finale Medley ^{5}"	Chito Ilacad; Jose Ilacad Jr.; Canseco; Florante de Leon	11:43
Total length:			68:57

^{1} ("Yesterday When I Was Young", "The Music Played", "Moonlight Becomes You", "You and the Night and the Music", "Three Good Reasons")
^{2} ("Hiram", "Maging Sino Ka Man", "Sana Maulit Muli")
^{3} ("Estudyante Blues", "Bonggahan", "Problema Na Naman", "Laki sa Layaw", "Paikot-ikot")
^{4} ("All by Myself", "I Will Survive", "The Greatest Performance of My Life", "This Is My Life")
^{5} ("Superstar ng Buhay Ko", "Paano Kita Mapasasalamatan", "Handog")

== Musicians ==
Musical Director and Arrangements

- Mon Faustino

Second Keyboard

- Ding Faustino

Drums

- Tek Faustino

Bass Guitar

- Ed De Guzman

Lead Guitar

- Mon Espia

Back-up Vocals

- Judith Banal
- Jo Ramos
- The Opera
  - Manolo Tanquilot
  - Zebedee Zuniga
  - Sushi Reyes
  - Cecille Rojas

Saxophone and Electronic Wind Instruments

- Ike Dy Liacco

Percussions

- Joseph Aranza

Audio Album Recording

- Audio Captain Recording Studios

== Release history ==
Region	Release date	Label	Format	Catalogue
Philippines	1991	WEA	Double LP	P-94,616 (9031-75420-1)
Philippines	1991	WEA	CD	CDP-94,616 (9031-75420-2)
Philippines	1991	WEA	Double cassette	M5P-94,616 (9031-75420-4)

== See also ==
- Nora Aunor discography
