= Among My Favorites =

Studio album by Nora Aunor
- Released: 1970
- Genre: OPM
- Language: English
- Label: Alpha Records Corporation (Philippines)

Nora Aunor chronology
More, More, More of Nora Aunor (1970)	Among My Favorites (1970)	The Golden Voice (1970)

Singles from Among My Favorites
- 1. "Don't You Believe It"; 2. "Look at Mine"; 3. "I believe" 4. "Mama"; 5. "Darling"; 6. "Because You're Gone"

Among My Favorites is a studio album by Filipino singer-actress Nora Aunor, released in 1970 by Alpha Records Corporation in the Philippines in LP format and later released in 1999 in a compilation/ cd format. The album contains original Filipino compositions by Robert Medina, George Canseco and Danny Subido, among others. Some of the recordings are covers of popular songs such as "Mama" and "I Believe".

== Background ==
Among My Favorites was arranged and conducted by Danny Subido and Doming Valdez with the accompaniment by The Ramrods and recorded at CAI Studios. The album contains 12 songs and some of them are original compositions.

== Track listing ==
=== Side one ===
No.	Title	Writer(s)	Length
1.	"For a Million Years"	Danny Subido	2:36
2.	"Mistaken"	Robert Medina	3:00
3.	"Loving You"	George Canseco	2:49
4.	"You Don't Love Me Anymore"	Robert Medina	2:09
5.	"I Wonder Why"	Robert Medina	2:24
6.	"Because You're Gone"	Robert Medina	2:35

=== Side two ===
No.	Title	Writer(s)	Length
1.	"Darling"	Danny Subido	2:20
2.	"Dee Da Doo Dee"	Robert Medina	2:13
3.	"Look at Mine"	Jackie Trent, Tony Hatch	2:41
4.	"Don't You Believe It"	Burt Bacharach, Bob Hilliard	3:08
5.	"I Believe"	Ervin Drake, Irvin Graham, Jimmy Shirl and Al Stillman	2:14
6.	"Mama"	Parsons, Turner, Brixie	2:38

== Album credits ==
Arranged and conducted by

- Doming Valdez
  - For Million Years
  - Mistaken
  - Loving You

Arranged and supervised by

- Danny Subido
  - (the rest of the album)

Accompaniment by

- The Ramrods

Recorded at

- CAI Studios
