= Christmas Songs (Nora Aunor album) =

Studio album by Nora Aunor
- Released: 1972
- Genre: Pop, Christmas music
- Language: English
- Label: Alpha Records Corporation (Philippines)

Nora Aunor chronology
Be Gentle (1972)	Christmas Songs (1972)	Ang Tindera (1972)

Christmas Songs is the second Christmas album released by Filipino singer-actress Nora Aunor in 1972. It was released through Alpha Records Corporation in the Philippines in LP format and later released in a compilation/CD format. The album contains some of the most famous traditional Christmas carols.

== Track listing ==
=== Side one ===
No.	Title	Writer(s)	Length
1.	"A Christmas Gift"		2:52
2.	"I'll Be Home for Christmas"	Kim Gannon, Walter Kent, Buck Ram	03:33
3.	"Merry Christmas Darling"	Frank Pooler; Richard Carpenter	03:03
4.	"O Little Town of Bethlehem"	Phillips Brooks	3:05
5.	"O Come All ye Faithful"	Frederick Oakeley, John Francis Wade	2:59
6.	"The Christmas Song"	Mel Tormé, Bob Wells	2:45

=== Side two ===
No.	Title	Writer(s)	Length
1.	"Mrs. Santa Claus"		02:16
2.	"Frosty the Snowman"	Walter "Jack" Rollins
3.	"Rudolph the Red-Nosed Reindeer"	Johnny Marks	3:28
4.	"Merry Christmas Polka"		2:54
5.	"The Little Drummer Boy"	Katherine Kennicott Davis	3:03
6.	"Blue Christmas"	Billy Hayes, Jay W. Johnson	2:07

== See also ==
- Nora Aunor discography
