= Be Gentle =

Studio album by Nora Aunor
- Released: 1972
- Genre: Traditional pop, classic pop
- Language: English
- Label: Alpha Records Corporation (Philippines), Mayon Records

Nora Aunor chronology
Mga Awitin ng Puso (1972)	Be Gentle (1972)	Christmas Songs (1972)

Be Gentle is a studio album by Filipino singer-actress Nora Aunor, released in 1972 by Alpha Records Corporation in the Philippines in LP format and later released in 1999 in a compilation/ cd format. The album contains 12 tracks among them is the original composition of Danny Holmsen "And God Smiled at Me" which was also the title of Nora Aunor's Award winning movie.

== Track listing ==
=== Side One ===
No.	Title	Writer(s)	Length
1.	"Be Gentle"	Danny Holmsen	03:06
2.	"Alone Again (Naturally)"	Gilbert O'Sullivan	03:45
3.	"Oh My Love"	John Lennon, Yoko Ono	03:25
4.	"You Are Everything"	Thom Bell, Linda Creed	02:40
5.	"Anticipation"	Carly Simon	03:15
6.	"I Made a Mistake"	Danny Holmsen	02:57

=== Side Two ===
No.	Title	Writer(s)	Length
1.	"Everyday of my Life"	R. Morgan, B. Morgan	02:55
2.	"Go My Heart"	Danny Holmsen	03:16
3.	"What's the Use of Loving You"	Danny Holmsen, H. Ilagan	02:40
4.	"And God Smiled at Me"	Danny Holmsen, R. Garcia	02:54
5.	"Gift of Love"	Danny Holmsen	03:05
6.	"Mister Cloud"	G.Fletcher, D. Fleff	03:07

== Album credits ==
Arranged and conducted by:

- Danny Holmsen
  - Be Gentle
  - Anticipation
  - Ang God SMiled at Me
  - Gift of Love
  - I Made a Mistake
  - Everyday of my LIfe
  - Go My Heart
  - What the use of Loving You

Arranged and conducted by:

- Doming Valdez
  - Oh My Love
  - Mister Cloud

Arranged and conducted by:

- The Blinkers
  - Alone Again (Naturally)
  - You are Everything

Recording supervisor

- Gil Cruz

Back up

- The Philamlife Choral Group

Recording engineers

- Ric L. Santos
- Boy Roxas

Recorded at

- CAI Studios

Original cover design

- J.E.M. Gonzales

== See also ==
- Nora Aunor discography
