= Blue Hawaii (disambiguation) =

Blue Hawaii is a 1961 musical film starring Elvis Presley.

Blue Hawaii may also refer to:

- Blue Hawaii (soundtrack), a soundtrack album by Elvis Presley to the 1961 film Blue Hawaii
- Blue Hawaii (Nora Aunor album), 1971
- "Blue Hawaii" (song), a popular song written for the 1937 film Waikiki Wedding
- "Till mitt eget Blue Hawaii", 1989 Vikingarna song
- Blue Hawaii (drink), a tropical cocktail
- Blue Hawaii (band), a musical duo from Montreal
