= Something Stupid =

Something Stupid or variants may refer to:

- Something Stupid (TV series), Australian comedy show aired in 1998
- "Somethin' Stupid", also "Something Stupid", a song written by Carson Parks, sung by Frank Sinatra and Nancy Sinatra
- "Something Stupid", a song by Shawn Desman from the 2010 album Fresh
- Something Stupid, an EP by Edgar Mortiz & Vilma Santos, won at the 1971 3rd Awit Awards
- "Something Stupid" (Better Call Saul), the title of the seventh episode of the fourth season of the television show Better Call Saul
