= Portrait (Nora Aunor album) =

Studio album by Nora Aunor
- Released: 1971
- Genre: Adult Contemporary, OPM
- Language: English
- Label: Alpha Records Corporation (Philippines)

Nora Aunor chronology
Christmas with Nora Aunor (1971)	Portrait (1971)	The Song of My Life (1971)

Singles from Portrait
- 1. "Missing You"; 2. "Waiting For You"; 3. "Dio Como Ti Amo"; 4. "My Beloved"; 5. "Theme for New Love"; 6. "Three Good Reasons"; 7. "Dreamboy"

Portrait is the first studio album released in 1971 by Filipino singer-actress Nora Aunor through Alpha Records Corporation in the Philippines in LP format and later released in 1999 in a compilation/ CD format. The album contains some original Filipino compositions by Robert Medina, George Canseco, and Danny Subido. The album had a total of 12 tracks, many of which are identified with Nora Aunor despite them being covers like Dio Como Ti Amo (originally in Italian by Domenico Modugno of "Volare" fame), True Picture (a Jack Jones original), Three Good Reasons (originally by Connie Francis) and Theme for a New Love (by Monkees member Davy Jones). Davy Jones later starred with Nora Aunor in Lollipops and Roses, a movie shot in the US that had Don Johnson in a featured role. Among the locally composed hits on the album was "Waiting For You" by George Canseco.

== Track listing ==
=== Side One ===
No.	Title	Writer(s)	Length
1.	"Waiting for You"	George Canseco	03:00
2.	"True Picture"	Heymann, Lippeman	02:45
3.	"You Are"	George Canseco	02:50
4.	"Dio Como Ti Amo"		03:36
5.	"My Beloved"	George Canseco	02:55
6.	"Prisoner of My Eyes"	Pockriss, Hackady	03:01

=== Side Two ===
No.	Title	Writer(s)	Length
1.	"Three Good Reasons"	Reed, Stephens	04:25
2.	"Mother Dear"	Abbie Hawes	03:06
3.	"Missing You"	Noe Sovino	02:25
4.	"Dreamboy"	Medina, Dominic	02:21
5.	"Around the World"	Young -Adamson	03:00
6.	"Theme for a New Love"	Narration	02:18

== Album credits ==
Arranged and conducted by:

- Doming Amarillo
  - Waiting for You
  - True Picture
  - You Are
  - Dio Como Ti Amo
  - My Beloved
- Doming Valdez
  - Three Good Reasons
  - Around the World
  - Theme for a New Love

Arranged and supervised by:

- Danny Subido
  - Missing You
  - Prisoner of My Eyes

Recording engineer

- Rick L. Santos

== See also ==
- Nora Aunor Discography
