= Pledging My Love (Nora Aunor & Manny de Leon album) =

Studio album by Nora Aunor and Manny De Leon
- Released: 1970
- Genre: Adult Contemporary, rock 'n' roll
- Language: English
- Label: Alpha Records Corporation (Philippines)

Nora Aunor and Manny De Leon chronology
The Golden Voice (1970)	Pledging My Love (1970)	The Phenomenal Nora Aunor (1970)

Singles from Pledging My Love
- 1. "Pledging My Love"; 2. "Devoted to You"; 3. "Let It Be Me"; 4. "I Will Always Love You"; 5. "Young Lovers"; 6. "Bye Bye Love"

Pledging My Love is the first studio album Filipino star singer-actress Nora Aunor made in collaboration with another Filipino singer and performer, Manny de Leon. It had a 1970 LP release in the Philippines by Alpha Records Corporation and nearly thirty years later, in 1999, was issued in a compilation/cd format. The album consists of love songs popular during the 1960s, some of which are sung as duets by Aunor and de Leon, who was the leading man in some of her 1970 film vehicles.

== Background ==
1970 was one of Nora Aunor's busiest years — she starred in eighteen films and Manny de Leon appeared with her in ten of these. Their first film together was 1969's Nora (Single Girl), with the viewing public accepting them as a love team and making their movies into blockbusters. Alpha Records took advantage of their singing talents and decided to issue a collaboration album featuring them performing a series of songs about love and romance.

== Track listing ==
=== Side one ===
No.	Title	Writer(s)	Length
1.	"Young Lovers"	Ray Hildebrand, Jill Jackson	2:36
2.	"All I Have to Do Is Dream"	Felice and Boudleaux Bryant	2:14
3.	"Melody of Love"	Bobby Vinton, Henry Mayer	2:07
4.	"True Love"	Cole Porter	1:53
5.	"Let Me Stay with You"	Snaffu Rigor	2:33
6.	"Pledging My Love"	Ferdinand Washington, Don Robey	2:13

=== Side two ===
No.	Title	Writer(s)	Length
1.	"Let Them Talk"	George Canseco	2:07
2.	"Bye Bye Love"	Felice and Boudleaux Bryant	2:06
3.	"Side by Side"	Harry Woods	2:02
4.	"Devoted to You"	Felice and Boudleaux Bryant	2:26
5.	"Let It Be Me"	Mann Curtis	2:26
6.	"I Will Always Love You"	Danny Subido	2:06

== See also ==
- Nora Aunor Discography
