= Dream Come True (Nora Aunor and Tirso Cruz III album) =

Studio album by Nora Aunor
- Released: 1971
- Genre: Adult Contemporary,
- Language: English
- Label: Vicor Music Corporation

Nora Aunor chronology
The Song of My Life (1971)	Dream Come True (1971)	The Golden Hits of Nora Aunor (1971)

Singles from Dream Come True
- 1. "Moonlight Becomes You"; 2. "Together Again"; 3. "Just You"; 4. "Alphabet Song"

Dream Come True is the second collaboration album by Filipino singer-actress Nora Aunor, with singer Tirso Cruz III released in 1971 by Vicor Music Corporation in LP format. The album contains duets of Aunor and Cruz. The Album contains 12 tracks including the song Moonlight Becomes You which is the winning song of Nora Aunor in the "Tawag ng Tanghalan" singing contest.

== Track listing ==
=== Side one ===
No.	Title	Writer(s)	Length
1.	"Together"	Kenny Gamble, Leon Huff
2.	"Lorelie"
3.	"You're my First Love"		02:22
4.	"Just You"	Sonny Bono	03:08
5.	"Hey Little Girl"
6.	"Goin' Out of My Head"	Teddy Randazzo, Bobby Weinstein	02:50

=== Side two ===
No.	Title	Writer(s)	Length
1.	"Together Again"	Buck Owens	03:30
2.	"Just a Little Bit of Your Love"
3.	"There's Just Forever"		02:16
4.	"Alphabet Song ('A' You're Adorable)"	Sid Lippman, Buddy Kaye, Fred Wise	02:16
5.	"Everybody's Talkin'"	Fred Neil	02:45
6.	"Moonlight Becomes You"	Jimmy Van Heusen, Johnny Burke	02:32

== See also ==
- Nora Aunor Discography
