= The Song of My Life =

Studio album by Nora Aunor
- Released: 1971
- Genre: Adult Contemporary, traditional pop
- Language: English
- Label: Alpha Records Corporation (Philippines)

Nora Aunor chronology
Portrait (1971)	The Song of My Life (1971)	Dream Come True (1971)

Singles from The Song of My Life
- 1. "Lollipops and Roses"; 2. "The Things We Did Last Summer"; 3. "I Just Can't Help Believing"; 4. "We've Only Just Begun"; 5. "Leaving on a Jet Plane"

The Song of My Life is the second studio album by Filipino singer-actress Nora Aunor, released in 1971 by Alpha Records Corporation in the Philippines in LP format and later released in 1999 in a compilation/ cd format. The album contains 12 tracks among them is "Lollipops and Roses" that team up with the teen idol Victor "Cocoy" Laurel and they even made a movie which became one of the biggest box office hits of the seventies.

== Background ==
This album collection will delight and refresh the hardest soul and ensure the enjoyment of Nora Aunor's thousand of fans once more whose career as a singer flourished through simple sincerity of her singing style. So sit back and capture the ambiance of her music at its best in your own home - From "The Song of My Life" album Cover

== Track listing ==
=== Side One ===
No.	Title	Writer(s)	Length
1.	"The Song of My Life"	Jeannot, Harvel, Fischman	04:00
2.	"Losing You"	Jean Renard, Carl Sigman	02:36
3.	"My Prayer"	Georges Boulanger, Jimmy Kennedy	03:11
4.	"Lollipops and Roses"		03:04
5.	"Release Me"	Eddie Miller, James Pebworth, Robert Yount, Dub Harris	03:18
6.	"The Things We Did Last Summer"	Sammy Cahn, Jule Styne	02:30

=== Side Two ===
No.	Title	Writer(s)	Length
1.	"I Just Can't Help Believing"	Barry Mann, Cynthia Weil	02:54
2.	"We Miss You"	Bule, Weil	02:10
3.	"We've Only Just Begun"	Roger Nichols, Paul Williams	02:54
4.	"Leaving on a Jet Plane"	John Denver	03:21
5.	"Now and Then"	George Canseco, Robert Medina	02:21
6.	"Me, The Peaceful Heart"	Tony Hazzard	02:29

== Album Credits ==
Arranged and Conducted by:

- Doming Valdez
  - The Song of My Life
  - Losing You
  - My Prayer
  - I Just Can't Help Believing
  - Me, The Peaceful Heart
- Restie Umali
  - Lollipops and Roses
  - The Things We Did Last Summer
  - Theme for a New Love

Arranged and Supervised by:

- Danny Subido
  - We Miss You
  - We've Only Just Begun
  - Leaving on a Jet Plane
  - Now and Then

Recording Engineer

- Rick L. Santos
