= Queen of Songs =

Studio album by Nora Aunor
- Released: 1972
- Genre: Traditional pop, classic pop
- Language: English
- Label: Alpha Records Corporation (Philippines)

Nora Aunor chronology
Mga Awiting Pilipino (1972)	Queen of Songs (1972)	Mga Awitin ng Puso (1972)

Singles from Queen of Songs
- 1. "Everybody's Somebody's Fool"; 2. "I’d Like To Teach The World To Sing"; 3. "Sweet Seasons"; 4. "The Wedding"; 5. "You and I"; 6. "Lo Siento Mucho"; 7. "A Poor Man's Roses"; 8. "Love Me with All Your Heart"; 9. "Sayonara"; 10. "Who's Sorry Now?"

Queen of Songs is a studio album by Filipino singer-actress Nora Aunor released in 1972 by Alpha Records Corporation in the Philippines in LP format and later released in 1999 in a compilation/ cd format. it contains 12 tracks consisting of mainly cover versions of Connie Francis (Everybody's Somebody's Fool and Who's Sorry Now), Carole King (Sweet Seasons) and Petula Clark (You and I and Love Me With All Your Heart). She also ventured into singing foreign language tunes in Spanish (Lo Siento Mucho) and in Japanese (Here's My Happiness). The latter was originally sung by Teddy Tanaka and covered also famously by Nora Aunor's sometime singing partner Eddie Peregrina. The Irving Berlin penned Sayonara from the 1957 film of the same name, while Japanese in theme, is fully in English. On the other hand, Love Me With All Your Heart, was originally a Spanish song, Cuando calienta el sol. The same can be said of The Wedding which was originally a Spanish tune named La Novia (the Bride).

The extended version of Nora Aunor's famous Coca-Cola commercial, I'd Like To Teach The World To Sing is also included here.

== Track listing ==
=== Side one ===
No.	Title	Writer(s)	Length
1.	"A Poor Man's Roses"	Bob Hilliard, Milton De Lugg	03:29
2.	"You and I"	L Bricuse	03:19
3.	"The Wedding"	J. Prieto, F. Jay	02:32
4.	"Sayonara"	I. Berlin	03:48
5.	"Lo Siento Mucho"	T. Grooms	02:13
6.	"Love Me with All Your Heart"	C & M Regual, T. Stern	02:19

=== Side two ===
No.	Title	Writer(s)	Length
1.	"Sweet Seasons"	C. King, T. Stern	02:41
2.	"I'd Like to Teach the World to Sing"	Roger Cook, Roger Greenaway, Bill Backer, Billy Davis	02:12
3.	"Everybody's Somebody's Fool"	Jack Keller, Howard Greenfield	03:34
4.	"Here's My Happiness"		02:36
5.	"Who's Sorry Now"	Ted Snyder, Bert Kalmar, Harry Ruby	02:24
6.	"There's Always Me"	Don Robertson	02:59

== Album credits ==
Musical Arranger

- Doming Valdez

Recording Supervisor

- Gil Cruz

Recorded At

- CAI Studios

Original Cover Design

- Rudy Retanan

== See also ==
- Nora Aunor discography
