= Odette Quesada =

Filipino singer-songwriter (born 1965)

- Born: Odellavania Quesada Flewelling; January 13, 1965 (age 61); Manila, Philippines
- Genres: Pop, OPM
- Occupations: Singer, songwriter, record producer
- Instruments: Piano, guitar
- Years active: 1982–present
- Label: Vicor Music
- Spouse: Bodjie Dasig (1993–2012)

Odellavania Quesada Flewelling is a Filipino singer and songwriter known for her contributions to OPM, notably hits such as "Till I Met You", "Give Me a Chance", and "Friend of Mine", which have become karaoke staples in the Philippines.

Among her early hits, "Till I Met You" won the grand prize in the professional category at the 6th Metro Manila Popular Music Festival in 1983. She went on to release six albums. In January 2024, she received the Parangal Levi Celerio Lifetime Achievement Award at the 15th PMPC Star Awards for Music

She was previously married to fellow OPM singer-songwriter Bodjie Dasig, who died in 2012.

== Early life ==
Quesada was born to John Flewelling, an American originally from New Jersey, and Thelma Quesada, of San Juan. Her mother was working abroad as a singer and jazz pianist, so she spent her childhood years abroad. When her mother remarried, she lived in Hawaii. When she was in the Philippines for school, she was raised by her grandmother, Dorotea Quesada. At 15 years old, she decided to stay in Manila. By that age, she knew she wanted to be a songwriter. During this time, she was studying at the Philippine Women’s University.

== Career ==
=== 1980s–1990s ===
When Quesada was 16 years old and in her senior year of high school, she entered the amateur division of the 1982 Metropop Song Festival. The previous year, she had entered with a Tagalog composition, but lost. For the 1982 competition, she submitted "Give Me A Chance", a song that was inspired by Paul McCrane's "Is It Okay if I Call You Mine?". It went on to be interpreted by Ric Segreto as his debut single and win second place in the competition and top the charts. She thus got the opportunity to work on Segreto's debut album. Aside from "Give Me A Chance", she also wrote “Don’t Know What To Say (Don’t Know Want to Do)”, which became the third single on the album, and two other songs. Initially, Vicor Music told her that her songs wouldn't be part of the album if she didn't give up her publishing rights. She refused to give up her publishing rights, and after a conversation with Vic del Rosario, she was allowed to keep her publishing rights and the songs were included on Segreto's album. That year, she also wrote "Need You Back" for Raymond Lauchengco, his first recording.

Also in 1982, Quesada began studying at the UP College of Music. It was during this time that she got to work with Kuh Ledesma, one of her inspirations. For Ledesma’s Just You, Just Me album, Odette wrote “A Long, Long, Time Ago” and "Sweet Melody". She also offered her “Till I Met You” for the album, but she declined. She decided to enter it in the 1983 Metropop competition, now in the professional division. This time, Ledesma interpreted the song, and they both won first place.

Quesada then wrote on several film soundtracks. She wrote "To Love Again" in 1983 for Sharon Cuneta for the film of the same name. She also was involved in the soundtrack of the 1984 film Bagets with the songs "Farewell", which was sung by Lauchengco, and "Growing Up", which was sung by Gary Valenciano. "Farewell" went on to become a popular song for graduation ceremonies. "Growing Up" also won Best Disco Song at the Cecil Awards in 1985, although in her acceptance speech, she had to explain that it was not a disco song. It was then that Vic del Rosario convinced her to sing her own songs while continuing to write them, similar to Carole King. Her first single was "Friend of Mine", which was successful. She then decided to release her first album containing her own versions of the songs she had written up to that point of her career.

In April 1993, Quesada married fellow OPM singer-songwriter Bodjie Dasig. She wrote several of the songs on his 1994 album Oh! Baby. In 1996, Quesada won an international songwriting contest with Dasig as her arranger. A year later, she wrote the lead single "More Than I Should" for Lani Misalucha's debut album of the same name.

=== 2000s ===
In 2001, Quesada and her family moved to the US, as Dasig wanted to help his sister with her business, and their son, Darian, had breathing problems due to the pollution in Metro Manila. Her grandmother had also passed away a year prior. The couple continued writing songs. They worked together on Nora Aunor's 2009 album Habang Panahon, which was only released in the US. Its lead single of the same name was originally written by Dasig in 1994 for Quesada as a Valentine's Day gift. The single went on to be used in the Metro Manila Film Festival entry El Presidente.

The couple also did gigs alongside Fe de los Reyes. They also worked on the music and libretto of Amerikana: Made In The Philippines, a musical comedy play that starred de los Reyes.

=== 2010s–present ===
On November 14, 2015, the Filipino American Symphony Orchestra paid tribute to her in their concert “Faso Goes Pops!”. In December 2016, she returned to the Philippines where she was given a tribute on the ABS-CBN Sunday noontime show, ASAP.

In January 2020, Quesada returned to the Philippines to hold a two-day concert, Odette Quesada, Hopeless Romantic, at Bonifacio Global City (BGC). During the COVID-19 pandemic, she held several virtual concerts and reunited with de los Reyes in one of her concerts. On September 1, 2023, she held her Odette Quesada All Hits anniversary concert at the Newport Performing Arts Theater in Pasay to celebrate 40 years in the music industry. The concert sold out two months in advance and two repeat shows were added, which both also sold out. In January 2024, she received the Parangal Levi Celerio Lifetime Achievement Award at the 15th Star Awards for Music. She then held a joint Valentine's Day concert with Ogie Alcasid a month later. In January 2025, she was honored at the Ryan Cayabyab Awards. She also held her 60th birthday concert at BGC later that month.

== Personal life ==
In April 1993, Quesada married fellow OPM singer-songwriter Bodjie Dasig, who died in 2012 at the age of 48. They worked together on many songs and have a son, Darian.

Quesada studied at the UP College of Music but did not graduate. She currently works in an office job in San Francisco.

== Discography ==
- Hopeless Romantic (1984)
- Quesada (1990)
- Careless (1992)
- Sa'yo Pa Rin (1997)
- I'm Perfect (2014)

=== Appearances and collaborations ===
- Kamandag: Bodjie's Law of Gravity - Bodjie Dasig (1992)
- Menemis Willie - Willie Nepomuceno (1993)
- Always on My Mind - Ric Segreto (1994)
- Pag Katabi Kita - Vina Morales (1994)
- Willie Nep for President - Willie Nepomuceno (1996)
- Getting to Know - Ariel Rivera (1997)
- Iba Nang Babae Ngayon - Bodjie & the Law of Gravity (1997)
- More Than I Should - Lani Misalucha (1997)
- Habang Panahon - Nora Aunor (2009)
- Hindi Ko Akalain - Marco Sison (2011)

== See also ==
- Original Pilipino music
- Bodjie Dasig
