= Burl Ives Sings Pearly Shells and Other Favorites =

Studio album by Burl Ives
- Released: 1964
- Length: 28:13
- Label: Decca
- Producer: Milt Gabler

Professional ratings
Review scores
Source	Rating
Allmusic	4/5 stars

Pearly Shells and Other Favorites is a 1964 album by Burl Ives, produced by Milt Gabler and directed by Owen Bradley. Featuring songs composed by Harlan Howard, Merle Kilgore, Tillman Franks, Mel Tillis and Freddie Hart, among others, the album reached No. 65 on Billboard's 1965 Pop Album Chart. The title song, "Pearly Shells," reached No. 60 on Billboard's 1964 Pop Singles Chart. Greg Adams of Allmusic writes, "Don't let the shortage of well-known songs keep you away from this delightful and well-crafted album."

== Track listing ==
1. "Pearly Shells" (Popo O Ewa) (Webley Edwards, Leon Pober) - 2:23
2. "Don't Let Love Die" (Fred Carter Jr.) - 2:49
3. "Two of the Usual" (Fred Carter Jr.) - 2:35
4. "The Legend of the "T"" (Thomas Hall) - 2:14
5. "Lower Forty" (Fred Carter Jr.) - 2:39
6. "Lynching Party" (Harlan Howard) - 2:20
7. "What Little Tears Are Made Of" (Don Bowman) - 2:07
8. "Kentucky Turkey Buzzard" (Tillman Franks, Merle Kilgore) - 2:11
9. "I Ain't Missing Nobody" (Mel Tillis) - 2:07
10. "Hard Luck and Misery" (Harlan Howard) - 2:32
11. "Okeechobee Ocean" (Fred Burch, Mel Tillis) - 2:06
12. "Who Done It?" (Freddie Hart, Harlan Howard) - 2:10
