= Mga Awiting Pilipino =

Studio album by Nora Aunor
- Released: 1972
- Genre: OPM, Folk Music
- Language: Filipino
- Label: Alpha Records Corporation (Philippines)

Nora Aunor chronology
Blue Hawaii (1971)	Mga Awiting Pilipino (1972)	Queen of Songs (1972)

Singles from Mga Awiting Pilipino
- 1. "Kung Maging Ulila"; 2. "Ti Ayat Ti Meysa Nga Ubing"; 3. "Sarung Banggi"; 4. "Dandansoy"; 5. "Walay Angay"; 6. "Ay ay Kalisud"; 7. "Cariñosa"; 8. "Atin Cu Pung Singsing"; 9. "Chitchiritchit"; 10. "Sinisinta Kita"

Mga Awiting Pilipino is the second studio album in the Filipino language by Filipino singer-actress Nora Aunor. The album was released in 1972 by Alpha Records Corporation in the Philippines in LP format The album also contains some original Filipino compositions by Levi Celerio, a National Artist for Music.

== Background ==
The album also contains 12 Filipino Folk songs. Most of them are regional folk songs sung in the local languages like "Dandansoy" and "Walay Angay" in Hiligaynon, "Ay Kalisud" in Cebuano, "Sarung Banggi" in Bikol among others.

== Track listing ==
=== Side One ===
No.	Title	Writer(s)	Length
1.	"Sarung Banggi"	Potenciano Gregorio	02:25
2.	"Walay Angay"		02:36
3.	"Cariñosa"	Levi Celerio	02:41
4.	"Ay ay Kalisud"	Levi Celerio, R. Alinsud	02:30
5.	" Leron Leron Sinta"	Folk Song	02:39
6.	"Dandansoy"	Folk Song	03:00

=== Side Two ===
No.	Title	Writer(s)	Length
1.	"Kung Maging Ulila"	Juan Silos Jr.	02:45
2.	"Ti Ayat Ti Meysa Nga Ubing"	Folk Song	03:00
3.	"Chichiritchit"	Folk Song	03:09
4.	"Atin Cu Pung Singsing"	Folk Song	02:34
5.	"Sinisinta Kita"	Folk Song	02:15
6.	" Paruparong Bukid"	Folk Song	02:36

== See also ==
- Nora Aunor discography
