= Bodjie Dasig =

Filipino singer-songwriter (born 1963)

- Born: Darius Albert D. Dasig; June 10, 1963; Manila, Philippines
- Died: March 12, 2012 (aged 48); Los Angeles, California, U.S.
- Occupations: Singer-songwriter, guitarist
- Years active: 1989–2012
- Spouse: Odette Quesada (1993–2012; his death)
- Children: Darian Dasig

Darius Albert Delfín Dasig (June 10, 1963 – March 12, 2012), more widely known as Bodjie Dasig, was a Filipino singer, songwriter and music producer. He first came into prominence for writing the song "Ale (Nasa Langit Na Ba Ako)?" ("Ma'am (Have I Gone to Heaven)?") and "Maáalala Mo Pa Rin" ("You'll Still Remember") for singer Richard Reynoso, and "Ayo' ko Na Sana" ("I Wish I Didn't Have To") for Ariel Rivera. He also wrote and sang the hit song "Sana Dalawa ang Puso Ko" ("I Wish I Had Two Hearts") for his band Bodjie's Law of Gravity, which became the theme song of a film with the same name in 1994.

== Career ==
Dasig got his start playing in the band Cicada alongside Caloy Balcells and Willie Revillame. They had the opportunity to back up Randy Santiago.

By the 1990s, he was known as the leader of Bodjie's Law of Gravity and for his songwriting skills. In 1994, he released his next album Oh! Baby. He then composed Lani Misalucha's debut single "More than I Should". She had previously been a backup singer for Bodjie's Law of Gravity. Another song he composed for Misalucha was "Sakayan ng Jeep", which would go on to be Nikki Gil's debut single in 2006. In 2001, he worked on the Rico J. Puno album Aliw. One of his final works was on Nora Aunor's 2009 album Habang Panahon, which was only released in the US, and on Marco Sison's album Hindi Ko Akalain.

== Personal life ==
Dasig also collaborated with his wife of almost 19 years, fellow singer-songwriter Odette Quesada, whom he married in 1993. They collaborated on the song "My Favorite Story", which was written for their song and recorded by David Pomeranz. He dedicated the song "Habang Panahon" to her. They moved to the US during the 2000s, as he wanted to help his sister with her business.

== Death ==
Dasig died in a Los Angeles hospital on March 12, 2012, after a long bout with cancer. He was survived by Quesada and their son Darian. In 2025, FILSCAP honored him posthumously with a Lifetime Achievement Award.

== Discography ==
=== Studio albums ===
- Iwas Pusoy (Alpha Music) (1990)
- Kamandag (Sony BMG) (1992)
- Oh! Baby (1994)

=== Songs ===
- "Kamandag
- "Bakit Na Naman?"
- "Travelling Song"
- "Love Come Knocking"
- "Please Listening"
- "Never Get Enough"
- "Itty Bity Bit"
- "Kung Sya Nga Ba?"
- "From Day to Day"
- "Sana Dalawa ang Puso Ko"
