= Ang Tindera =

Studio album by Nora Aunor
- Released: 1971
- Recorded: 1971
- Studios: Cinema Audio, Inc.
- Genres: OPM, Folk Music
- Length: 35:55
- Language: Filipino
- Labels: Mayon Records; Alpha Records

Nora Aunor chronology
Christmas Songs (1972)	Ang Tindera (1971)	Nora Today (1972)

Singles from Ang Tindera
- 1. "Ang Tindera"; 2. "Bulaklak sa Parang"; 3. "Kusinera"; 4. "Unang Halik"

Ang Tindera is the first studio album by Filipino singer-actress Nora Aunor in Filipino. The album was released in the Philippines in 1971 by Mayon Records in LP and cassette formats and later released on December 13, 1999 by Alpha Records in a compilation/CD format. The album contains some of the original Filipino compositions by Danny Holmsen, Ading Fernando and Ernie de la Pena. The album contains 12 tracks, among them is the "Unang Halik", originally by Cely Bautista in 1955, which became one of the most popular songs by Ms. Aunor.

== Track listing ==
Side one
No.	Title	Writer(s)	Length
1.	"Mariposa"	D. Holmsen, A. Fernando	2:23
2.	"Kusinera"	D. Holmsen, E. dela Pena	2:25
3.	"Despatsadora"	D. Holmsen, A. Fernando	3:27
4.	"Unang Halik"	D. Holmsen, A. Fernando	3:12
5.	"Binatang Makisig"	D. Holmsen, A. Fernando	2:54
6.	"Ang Tindera"	D. Holmsen, A. Fernando	3:08

Side two
No.	Title	Writer(s)	Length
1.	"Binibining Palengke"	D. Holmsen, E. dela Pena	3:26
2.	"Bulaklak sa Parang"	D. Holmsen, A. Fernando	2:54
3.	"Bata Pa Ako"	Danny Holmsen	3:09
4.	"Nagmamahalan"	Danny Holmsen	2:34
5.	"Nagbalik na Lumipas"	Danny Holmsen	2:22
6.	"Sa Aming Muling Pagkikita"	D. Holmsen, E. dela Pena	2:36

== Credits and personnel ==
- Rudy Retanan - album design
- Tropicana - color photo
- Danny Holmsen - arranger and conductor
- Gil Cruz - recording supervision
- Boy Roxas - recording engineer
- Cinema Audio, Inc. - recording studio

== See also ==
- Nora Aunor discography
