= Nora Today =

Studio album by Nora Aunor
- Released: 1972
- Language: English
- Label: Alpha Records Corporation (Philippines)

Nora Aunor chronology
| Ang Tindera (1972) | Nora Today (1972) | At Home with Nora (1972) |

Singles from Nora Today
- 1. "The Impossible Dream"; 2. "Bless the Beasts and Children"; 3. "A Promise of Love"

Nora Today is the studio album by Filipino singer-actress Nora Aunor released in 1972 by Alpha Records Corporation in the Philippines in LP format and later released in 2000 in a compilation/ cd format. The album contains 12 tracks of the well-loved songs of all time, including two covers of Carpenters songs (Sing and Bless the Beasts and Children). Nora Aunor will also star in a movie also called Impossible Dream a year later.

== Track listing ==
=== Side one ===
| No. | Title | Writer(s) | Length |
|---|---|---|---|
| 1. | "A Promise of Love" | C. Sweeny, M. Charlap |
| 2. | "So Lucky" | Billy Owen |
| 3. | "The Impossible Dream" | Mitch Leigh, Joe Darion | 02:39 |
| 4. | "Sing" | Joe Raposo | 03:18 |
| 5. | "A Love Song" | C. Gierard, J. Johnston |
| 6. | "Bless the Beasts and Children" | B. De Vorzon - T. Botkin Jr. | 03:09 |

=== Side two ===
| No. | Title | Writer(s) | Length |
|---|---|---|---|
| 1. | "Song Without End" | Petula Clark |
| 2. | "Adios My Love" | Newell, Hadjidakis |
| 3. | "I'd Love You to Want Me" | Lobo | 04:04 |
| 4. | "I've Found Someone of My Own" | F. Robinson |
| 5. | "Teardrop on Teardrop" | M. Murray, P. Callander |
| 6. | "I Like Your Music" | Sonny Curtis |

== See also ==
- Nora Aunor discography
