= Ako ay Pilipino =

Song by Kuh Ledesma
- Language: Filipino
- English title: I'm a Filipino
- Released: 1981
- Genre: OPM
- Length: 2:37
- Songwriter: George Canseco

Ako ay Pilipino (“I am Filipino”) is a Filipino patriotic song written by George Canseco in 1981. It was commissioned by First Lady Imelda Marcos for the second inauguration of her husband, President Ferdinand Marcos, and performed by Kuh Ledesma.

On February 8, 2022 Toni Gonzaga performed a shorter cover version as the final stanza to end UniTeam's proclamation rally for Bongbong Marcos (Marcos, Sr. and Imelda's son) and Sara Duterte's campaign for President and Vice-President, held at the Philippine Arena.

== Lyrics ==
The lyrics meaning are Patrious.
