= Habang Panahon =

Studio album by Nora Aunor
- Released: 2009
- Genre: OPM
- Language: Tagalog, English
- Label: HIFI Productions, LLC
- Producer: Bodjie Dasig and Odette Quesada

Nora Aunor chronology
| Muling Umawit ang Puso (Soundtrack) (1995) | Habang Panahon (2009) |

Singles from Habang Panahon
- 1. "Habang Panahon"

Habang Panahon is a studio album by Filipino singer and actress Nora Aunor, released in 2009 by HIFI Productions in the United States in CD form and through digital download on iTunes and other digital download stores. The album contains nine original compositions by Bodjie Dasig and Odette Quesada, and one by Christine Bendebel.

== Background ==
After more than a decade, Aunor released a new album which was entirely recorded in the US; this is the time when Aunor was in hiatus for 8 years. The album was recorded before she lost her singing voice due to a cosmetic surgery.

== Track listing ==
| No. | Title | Writer(s) | Length |
|---|---|---|---|
| 1. | "Habang Panahon" | Bodjie Dasig | 05:24 |
| 2. | "Pangako" | Bodjie Dasig | 04:51 |
| 3. | "Starlight" | Bodjie Dasig, Odette Quesada | 05:02 |
| 4. | "Kailan" | Bodjie Dasig | 05:39 |
| 5. | "Kung" | Odette Quesada | 04:00 |
| 6. | "Ganyan Nga Ba?" | Bodjie Dasig | 03:48 |
| 7. | "Friends" | Bodjie Dasig, Odette Quesada | 04:38 |
| 8. | "Ligaya" | Christine Bendebel | 04:38 |
| 9. | "Pasko" | Bodjie Dasig | 03:02 |
| 10. | "Sa Iyo Pa Rin" | Bodjie Dasig, Odette Quesada | 04:37 |

- Track number 3 was also recorded by Nina for her album Stay Alive, released in 2011.

== Album credits ==
- Executive producer: HIFI Productions, LLC
- Producers: Bodjie Dasig, Odette Quesada
- Associate producer: Antonio Vizmonte
- Arranged by: Bodgie Dasig
- Recorded at: NicNak Sound Studios
- Special guest: Ner de Leon (sax solo on "Kailan" and "Friends")

== See also ==
- Nora Aunor discography
