= The Golden Voice (album) =

Studio album by Nora Aunor
- Released: 1970
- Recorded: 1970
- Studio: CAI Studios
- Genre: Adult Contemporary; OPM
- Length: 29:14
- Language: English
- Label: Alpha Records (Philippines)

Nora Aunor chronology
Among My Favorites (1970)	The Golden Voice (1970)	Pledging My Love (1970)

Singles from The Golden Voice
- 1. "Oh Promise Me" Released: 1970; 2. "Mother Song" Released: 1970; 3. "Lucky Girl" Released: 1970; 4. "Little Bird" Released: 1970; 5. "Heavenly Father" Released: 1970; 6. "My Song" Released: 1970; 7. "Sweetheart, Sweetheart" Released: 1970

The Golden Voice is a studio album by Filipino singer-actress Nora Aunor, released in 1970 by Alpha Records Corporation in the Philippines in LP and cassette formats and later re-released on May 14, 1999 in a compilation/CD format. The album contains some of the original Filipino compositions by Robert Medina, George Canseco and Danny Subido. The album contains 12 tracks among them "Mother Song" which became one of the most popular songs of Ms. Aunor.

== Background ==
"This album collection captures the music of three greatest Filipino composers of all time; George Canseco, Danny Subido and Robert Medina. The recording captures all the wondrous melodic qualities and varieties that are essence of the great composers music, songs which are sung in the way Nora Aunor can, with heart, emotion and above all total sincerity. It is a performance that you will enjoy for years to come... a great singer with the Golden Voice" - From The Golden Voice album cover

== Track listing ==
=== LP/Cassette edition ===
Side one
No.	Title	Writer(s)	Length
1.	"Sweetheart, Sweetheart"	Danny Subido	2:43
2.	"My Song"	George Canseco	2:20
3.	"I'll Wait for Someone"	Danny Subido	3:03
4.	"Mother Song"		3:16
5.	"Heavenly Father"		2:17
6.	"Oh Promise Me"	Buck Ram	2:09
Total length:			14:48

Side two
No.	Title	Writer(s)	Length
1.	"Little Bird"	Danny Subido	1:43
2.	"Crazy Feeling"	Robert Medina	2:54
3.	"Lucky Girl"	Robert Medina	2:18
4.	"All I Own"	Medina, Canseco	3:21
5.	"My Little Boy"	Danny Subido	2:02
6.	"The End of Our Love"	Robert Medina	3:18
Total length:			14:26 29:14

=== CD edition ===
No.	Title	Writer(s)	Length
1.	"Sweetheart, Sweetheart"	Danny Subido	2:43
2.	"My Song"	George Canseco	2:20
3.	"I'll Wait for Someone"	Danny Subido	3:03
4.	"Mother Song"		3:16
5.	"Heavenly Father"		2:17
6.	"Oh Promise Me"	Buck Ram	2:09
7.	"Little Bird"	Danny Subido	1:43
8.	"Crazy Feeling"	Robert Medina	2:54
9.	"Lucky Girl"	Robert Medina	2:18
10.	"All I Own"	Medina, Canseco	3:21
11.	"My Little Boy"	Danny Subido	2:02
12.	"The End of Our Love"	Robert Medina	3:18
Total length:			29:14

== Album credits ==
Arranged and conducted by

- Doming Valdez
  - Sweetheart, Sweetheart
  - My Song
  - I'll Wait for Someone
  - Mother Song

Arranged by

- Orly Ilacad
  - Crazy Feeling
  - Lucky Girl
  - All I Own
  - The End of Our Love
- Danny Subido
  - Heavenly Father
  - Oh Promise Me
  - My Little Boy

Recorded at

- CAI Studios
