= Superstar Nora Aunor =

Studio album by Nora Aunor
- Released: 1971
- Genre: Adult Contemporary, traditional pop, Classic pop
- Language: English
- Label: Alpha Records Corporation (Philippines)

Nora Aunor chronology
The Golden Hits of Nora Aunor (1971)	Superstar Nora Aunor (1971)	Blue Hawaii (1971)

Singles from Superstar Nora Aunor
- 1. "Superstar"; 2. "Rose Garden"; 3. "I Play and Sing"; 4. "Loss of Love"; 5. "No One Will Ever Know"; 6. "And I Love You So"; 7. "Let Me Be With You"; 8. "Time In Love"

Superstar Nora Aunor is the fourth studio album by Filipino singer-actress Nora Aunor released in 1971 by Alpha Records Corporation in the Philippines in LP format and later released in 1999 in a compilation/ cd format. The album contains 12 tracks, 11 of which are cover versions like "Superstar" which was popularized by The Carpenters in 1971. The one original composition, In My Life, became one of Nora Aunor's standards.

== Track listing ==
=== Side One ===
No.	Title	Writer(s)	Length
1.	"Superstar"	Leon Russell, Bonnie Bramlett	03:32
2.	"Let Me Be With You"	M. David, A. Thomas	03:09
3.	"All Alone Am I"	Arthur Altman, Manos Hadjidakis	02:44
4.	"Loss of Love"	Bob Merrill, Henry Mancini	02:45
5.	"I Play and Sing"	Irwin Levine, L. Russell Brown	02:17
6.	"In My Life"	M. Villagracia	02:14

=== Side Two ===
No.	Title	Writer(s)	Length
1.	"And I Love You So"	Don McLean	03:15
2.	"Trains and Boats and Planes"	Burt Bacharach, Hal David	02:33
3.	"Time and Love"	Laura Nyro	03:22
4.	"Rose Garden"	Joe South	02:30
5.	"I Left My Heart in San Francisco"	George Cory, Douglass Cross	02:47
6.	"No One Will Ever Know"	M. Fores, Fred Ross	02:36

== Album credits ==
Arranged and Conducted by:

- Doming Valdez

Recorded At

- CAI Studios

Original Cover Design

- Rudy Retanan

== See also ==
- Nora Aunor Discography
