= Mga Awitin ng Puso =

Studio album by Nora Aunor
- Released: 1972
- Recorded: 1972
- Studio: CAI Studios
- Genres: OPM, folk music
- Length: 42:45
- Language: Filipino
- Label: Alpha/Mayon Records (Philippines)

Nora Aunor chronology
| Queen of Songs (1972) | Mga Awitin ng Puso (1972) | Be Gentle (1972) |

Mga Awitin ng Puso is a studio album by Filipino singer-actress Nora Aunor, released in 1972 by Alpha Records Corporation in the Philippines in LP and cassette formats and later re-released on November 4, 1999 in a compilation/CD format. Songs from this album are also included on a compilation album from 1990 called Mga Awiting Sariling Atin. This is Aunor's third album with all-Filipino compositions featuring kundiman classics "Ikaw", "Buhat", "Dahil sa Iyo", "Minamahal Kita" and "Pangako ng Puso".

== Track listing ==
=== LP/Cassette edition ===
Side one
| No. | Title | Writer(s) | Length |
|---|---|---|---|
| 1. | "Ipinagdarasal Kita" | Jerry Brandy | 3:38 |
| 2. | "Ikaw" | M. Velarde Jr. - D. Santiago | 3:10 |
| 3. | "Pangako ng Puso" | D. Holmsen - A. Fernando | 3:44 |
| 4. | "Ang Mahal Ko'y Ikaw" | Jerry Brandy | 2:52 |
| 5. | "Minamahal Kita" | M. Velarde Jr. - D. Santiago | 4:00 |
| 6. | "Marupok Na Sumpa" | Phillip Maninang | 3:28 |
| Total length: | | | 20:52 |

Side two
| No. | Title | Writer(s) | Length |
|---|---|---|---|
| 1. | "Dahil sa Iyo" | M. Velarde Jr. - D. Santiago | 2:52 |
| 2. | "Pag-ibig Ikaw ang Maysala" | Jerry Brandy | 3:41 |
| 3. | "Tapat Na Pag-ibig" | D. Holmsen - A. Fernando | 3:39 |
| 4. | "Ikaw ay Akin" | M. Velarde Jr. - D. Santiago | 4:02 |
| 5. | "Lihim Kitang Mahal" | Ibarra Samson | 3:42 |
| 6. | "Buhat" | M. Velarde Jr. - D. Santiago | 3:57 |
| Total length: | | | 21:53 |

=== CD edition ===
| No. | Title | Writer(s) | Length |
|---|---|---|---|
| 1. | "Ikaw" | M. Velarde Jr. - D. Santiago | 3:10 |
| 2. | "Buhat" | M. Velarde Jr. - D. Santiago | 3:57 |
| 3. | "Dahil sa Iyo" | M. Velarde Jr. - D. Santiago | 2:52 |
| 4. | "Ang Mahal Ko'y Ikaw" | Jerry Brandy | 2:52 |
| 5. | "Ikaw ay Akin" | M. Velarde Jr. - D. Santiago | 4:02 |
| 6. | "Ipinagdarasal Kita" | Jerry Brandy | 3:38 |
| 7. | "Minamahal Kita" | M. Velarde Jr. - D. Santiago | 4:00 |
| 8. | "Tapat Na Pag-ibig" | D. Holmsen - A. Fernando | 3:39 |
| 9. | "Pag-ibig Ikaw ang Maysala" | Jerry Brandy | 3:41 |
| 10. | "Lihim Kitang Mahal" | Ibarra Samson | 3:42 |
| 11. | "Pangako ng Puso" | D. Holmsen - A. Fernando | 3:44 |
| 12. | "Marupok Na Sumpa" | Phillip Maninang | 3:28 |
| Total length: | | | 42:45 |

== Album credits ==
Musical arranger

- Doming Valdez

Recording supervisor

- Gil Cruz

Recorded at

- CAI Studios

Original cover design

- Rudy Retanan

== See also ==
- Nora Aunor discography
