= Christmas with Nora Aunor =

Studio album by Nora Aunor
- Released: 1970
- Recorded: 1970
- Studio: CAI Studios (Cinema Audio, Inc.)
- Genre: Pop; Christmas
- Length: 32:32
- Language: English
- Label: Alpha Records (Philippines)

Nora Aunor chronology
The Phenomenal Nora Aunor (1970)	Christmas with Nora Aunor (1970)	Portrait (1971)

Singles from Christmas with Nora Aunor
- 1. "Jingle Bells" Released: 1970; 2. "You're All I Want For Christmas" Released: 1970; 3. "Mamacita (Donde Esta Santa Claus)" Released: 1970; 4. "I Saw Mommy Kissing Santa Claus" Released: 1970; 5. "Christmas Story" Released: 1970; 6. "Silent Night" Released: 1970; 7. "White Christmas" Released: 1970; 8. "O Holy Night" Released: 1970

Christmas with Nora Aunor is the first Christmas album by Filipino singer-actress Nora Aunor, released in the Philippines in 1970 by Alpha Records on LP and cassette formats and later re-released on September 17, 1999 on a compilation/CD format. The album contains some of the most famous traditional Christmas carols.

== Background ==
The album is one of Aunor's best-selling albums, which was re-arranged to complement the voice of Nora Aunor.

== Track listing ==
=== LP edition ===
Side one
No.	Title	Writer(s)	Length
1.	"Christmas Story"	Pauline Walsh	2:49
2.	"O Holy Night"	Adolphe Adam; Placide Cappeau (Uncredited)	3:47
3.	"White Christmas"	Irving Berlin	2:41
4.	"I Saw Mommy Kissing Santa Claus"	Tommie Connor	1:39
5.	"You're All I Want For Christmas"	Glen Moore-Seger Ellis	2:48
6.	"Silent Night"	Joseph Mohr-Franz Gruber	2:46
Total length:			16:30

Side two
No.	Title	Writer(s)	Length
1.	"Jingle Bells"	James Lord Pierpont (Uncredited); Robert Dean (Miscredited)	2:14
2.	"Mamacita (Donde Esta Santa Claus)"	George Scheck-Rod Parker-Al Greiner (Uncredited)	2:34
3.	"Jingle Bell Rock"	Beal-Boothe	2:08
4.	"Silver Bells" (duet with Bobby Gonzales)	Jay Livingstone-Ray Evans	2:45
5.	"Whispering Hope" (duet with Bobby Gonzales)	Alice Hawthorne	3:25
6.	"Little Christmas Tree"	Mickey Rooney	2:56
Total length:			16:02 32:32

=== Cassette edition ===
Side one
No.	Title	Writer(s)	Length
1.	"Christmas Story"	Pauline Walsh	2:49
2.	"O Holy Night"	Adolphe Adam; Placide Cappeau (Uncredited)	3:47
3.	"White Christmas"	Irving Berlin	2:41
4.	"Silver Bells" (duet with Bobby Gonzales)	Jay Livingstone-Ray Evans	2:45
5.	"You're All I Want For Christmas"	Glen Moore-Seger Ellis	2:48
6.	"Silent Night"	Joseph Mohr-Franz Gruber	2:46
Total length:			17:36

Side two
No.	Title	Writer(s)	Length
1.	"Jingle Bells"	James Lord Pierpont (Uncredited); Robert Dean (Miscredited)	2:14
2.	"Mamacita (Donde Esta Santa Claus)"	George Scheck-Rod Parker-Al Greiner (Uncredited)	2:34
3.	"Jingle Bell Rock"	Beal-Boothe	2:08
4.	"I Saw Mommy Kissing Santa Claus"	Tommie Connor	1:39
5.	"Whispering Hope" (duet with Bobby Gonzales)	Alice Hawthorne	3:25
6.	"Little Christmas Tree"	Mickey Rooney	2:56
Total length:			14:56 32:32

=== CD edition ===
No.	Title	Writer(s)	Length
1.	"Silent Night"	Joseph Mohr-Franz Gruber	2:46
2.	"O Holy Night"	Adolphe Adam; Placide Cappeau (Uncredited)	3:47
3.	"Christmas Story"	Pauline Walsh	2:49
4.	"White Christmas"	Irving Berlin	2:41
5.	"Silver Bells" (duet with Bobby Gonzales)	Jay Livingstone-Ray Evans	2:45
6.	"You're All I Want For Christmas"	Glen Moore-Seger Ellis	2:48
7.	"Jingle Bells"	James Lord Pierpont (Uncredited); Robert Dean (Miscredited)	2:14
8.	"I Saw Mommy Kissing Santa Claus"	Tommie Connor	1:30
9.	"Mamacita (Donde Esta Santa Claus)"	George Scheck-Rod Parker-Al Greiner (Uncredited)	2:49
10.	"Jingle Bell Rock"	Beal-Boothe	2:09
11.	"Whispering Hope" (duet with Bobby Gonzales)	Alice Hawthorne	3:25
12.	"Little Christmas Tree"	Mickey Rooney	2:56
Total length:			31:19

== Credits and personnel ==
- Rudy Retanan – cover design
- Tropicana – color photo
- Mrs. Charito M. Gonzales – christmas decors
- Residence of Mr. & Mrs. Danny Rivera – location
- CAI Studios – recording studio
- Ric L. Santos – recording engineer

== See also ==
- Nora Aunor discography
