= The Golden Hits of Nora Aunor =

Compilation album by Nora Aunor
- Released: 1971
- Genre: Adult Contemporary, traditional pop
- Language: English
- Label: Alpha Records Corporation (Philippines)

Nora Aunor chronology
Dream Come True (1971)	The Golden Hits of Nora Aunor (1971)	Superstar Nora Aunor (1971)

Singles from The Golden Hits of Nora Aunor
- 1. "Mama"; 2. "Love Story"; 3. "I Love You So"; 4. "Mistaken"; 5. "Go Away"

The Golden Hits of Nora Aunor is the third studio album by Filipino singer-actress Nora Aunor released in 1971 by Alpha Records Corporation in the Philippines in LP format and later released in 1999 in a compilation/ cd format. The album contains 12 tracks, one of them being "Love Story" which was made popular by Andy Williams in 1970..

== Background ==
This was the third album that was released by Nora Aunor in 1971. Aunor became one of the highest paid singers at that time and her singles were selling in large numbers. This album contains her hit songs from her previous albums.

== Track listing ==
=== Side One ===
No.	Title	Writer(s)	Length
1.	"Love Story"	Francis Lai, Carl Sigman	03:27
2.	"Missing You"	Noe Sovino	02:25
3.	"I Believe"	Ervin Drake, Irvin Graham, Jimmy Shirl, Al Stillman	02:14
4.	"For A Million Years"	Danny Subido	02:36
5.	"Mother Song"		03:16
6.	"Waiting For You"	George Canseco	03:00

=== Side Two ===
No.	Title	Writer(s)	Length
1.	"My Song"	George Canseco	02:20
2.	"Mama"		03:55
3.	"I Love You So"	Robert Medina, Robert Dominic	02:30
4.	"Mistaken"	Robert Medina	03:00
5.	"Go Away"	Danny Subido,	02:34
