= Pearly Shells =

Song
- Songwriter(s): Webley Edwards and Leon Pober

Pearly Shells (Pupu A ʻO ʻEwa) is a Hawaiian folk song. The English lyrics were written by Webley Edwards and Leon Pober.

== Recordings ==
- Burl Ives (1960) on Burl Ives Sings Pearly Shells and Other Favorites
- Don Ho (1964)
- Arthur Lyman (1964)
- Billy Vaughn (1964)
- Trío los Panchos (1966)
- Ray Conniff (1967), recorded it on his Hawaiian Album
- The Waikikis (1967)
- Buddy Merrill (1970} on his album Beyond The Reef
- Nora Aunor (1971) on Blue Hawaii
- Slim Whitman (1977), recorded it on his Home on the Range album
- The Melbourne Ukulele Kollective

John Ford's 1963 movie Donovan's Reef utilized the song as its opening theme as well as in later scenes.

In the 1970s, C&H Sugar used the melody for their jingle
