= Blue Hawaii (Nora Aunor album) =

Studio album by Nora Aunor
- Released: 1971
- Genre: Hawaiian
- Length: 34:45 minutes
- Language: English
- Label: Alpha Records Corporation (Philippines)

Nora Aunor chronology
| Superstar Nora Aunor (1971) | Blue Hawaii (1971) | Mga Awiting Pilipino (1971) |

Singles from Superstar Nora Aunor
- 1. "Pearly Shells"; 2. "Little Brown Gal"; 3. "Tiny Bubbles"; 4. "Blue Hawaii"; 5. "Moonlight Swim"; 6. "My Little Grass Shack"; 7. "Beyond the Reef"; 8. "Aloha ʻOe"; 9. "To You Sweetheart, Aloha"; 10. "Cupid"; 11. "Can't Help Falling in Love"

Blue Hawaii is the fifth studio album by Filipino singer-actress Nora Aunor released in 1971 and her 14th album since 1967. This album was released by Alpha Records Corporation in the Philippines in LP format and later released in 1999 in a compilation/ cd format.

== About the album ==
Blue Hawaii is one of the highest selling albums by Aunor. The single, "Pearly Shells", sold more than 1 million units, making it one of the biggest selling singles in the Philippine music industry. It was later made into a movie with the same title where Nora Aunor starred opposite Tirso Cruz III.

== Track listing ==
=== Side one ===
| No. | Title | Writer(s) | Length |
|---|---|---|---|
| 1. | "Blue Hawaii" | Leo Robin, Ralph Rainger | 03:12 |
| 2. | "Tiny Bubbles" | Martin Denny, Leon Pober | 02:44 |
| 3. | "Can't Help Falling in Love" | Hugo Peretti, Luigi Creatore, George David Weiss | 02:47 |
| 4. | "Hawaiian Wedding Song" | Charles E. King, Al Hoffman, Dick Manning | 02:33 |
| 5. | "My Little Grass Shack" | Tommy Harrison, Johnny Noble, Bill Cogswell | 03:07 |
| 6. | "To You Sweetheart, Aloha" | H Owens | 02:53 |

=== Side two ===
| No. | Title | Writer(s) | Length |
|---|---|---|---|
| 1. | "Pearly Shells" | Webley Edwards, Leon Pober | 03:06 |
| 2. | "Beyond the Reef" | Jack Pitman | 02:46 |
| 3. | "Moonlight Swim" | Ben Weisman, Sylvia Dee | 02:11 |
| 4. | "Little Brown Gal" | | 02:11 |
| 5. | "Cupid" | | 02:30 |
| 6. | "Aloha ʻOe" | | 04:30 |

== Album credits ==
- Arranged and conducted by Doming Valdez
- Recorded at CAI Studios

== See also ==
- Nora Aunor discography
