= 3rd Awit Awards =

1971 Philippine music awards ceremony

- Date: June 1971
- Location: Manila Hotel, Ermita, Manila

Highlights
- Most awards: Nora Aunor; Bert Dominic; Philippine Rondalla; Vilma Santos; Danny Subido (2)
- Best Album: The Phenomenal Nora Aunor by Nora Aunor
- Best Mini-Album: Something Stupid by Edgar Mortiz & Vilma Santos
- Song of the Year: "Forever Loving You" by Bert Dominic
- Best Single: "Sixteen" by Vilma Santos

The 3rd Awit Awards were held in Manila Hotel located in the nation's capital, Manila. They gave awards to the outstanding musical achievements for the year 1970.

The award ceremony was originally to be held at the Cultural Center of the Philippines in March 1971. After some meetings, the Philippine Academy of the Recording Arts and Sciences decided to move it to May and would be held at the Araneta Coliseum. Yet again, it was delayed to June due to the elections of the board and the jurors and took place at the Manila Hotel.

A total of 36 awards were given that night. Nora Aunor, Bert Dominic, the Philippine Rondalla, Vilma Santos and Danny Subido both took home the most number of awards with 2.

== Winners ==
=== General ===
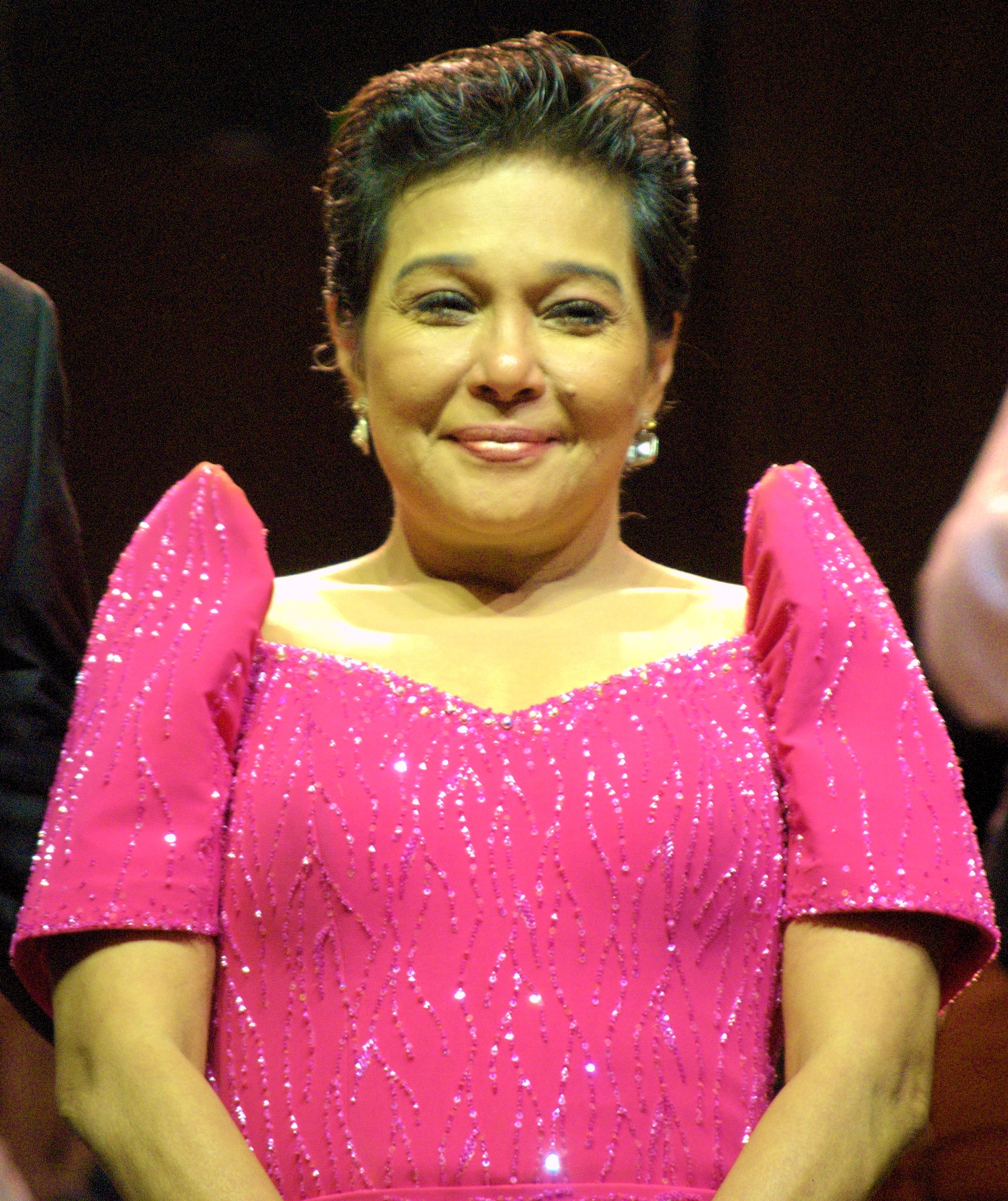
Nora Aunor, Best Album and Best Female Singer (English) winner

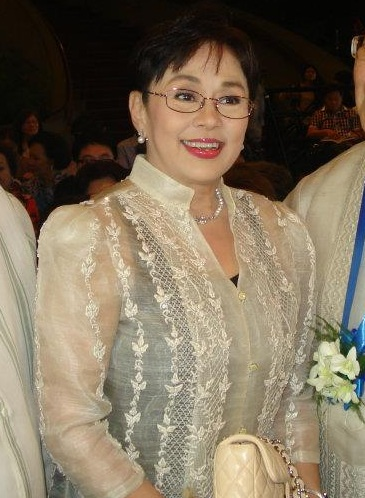
Vilma Santos, Best Single and Best Mini-Album winner

| Song of the Year | Best Single |
|---|---|
| "Forever Loving You" – Bert Dominic | "Sixteen" – Vilma Santos |
| Best Album | Best Mini-Album |
| The Phenomenal Nora Aunor – Nora Aunor | Something Stupid – Edgar Mortiz & Vilma Santos |

=== People ===
| Best Female Singer (English) | Best Male Singer (English) |
|---|---|
| Nora Aunor | Eddie Mesa |
| Best Female Singer (Vernacular) | Best Male Singer (Vernacular) |
| Amapola | Armando Ramos |
| Most Promising Female Singer | Most Promising Male Singer |
| Eva Vivar | Boy Mondragon; Jonathan Potenciano |
| Best Vocal Group (English) | Best Vocal Group (Vernacular) |
| Reycard Duet | D'Big 3 Sullivans |

=== Instrumental ===
| Best Instrumentalist | Best Instrumental Group | Best Instrumental Recording |
|---|---|---|
| Eric Dimson | Pandacan Original Brass Band | "Philippine Rondalla" – Philippine Rondalla |

=== Music for movies ===
Best Original Movie Music Theme
- Wanted: Perfect Mother – Danny Subido

=== Composing, lyric writing and arranging ===
| Best Composer (English) | Best Composer (Vernacular) |
|---|---|
| Bert Dominic | Bert Reyes |
| Best Lyricist (English) | Best Lyricist (Vernacular) |
| Danny Subido | Philip Maninang |
Best Musical Arranger
Doming Amarillo

=== Production ===
| Best Recording Engineer | Best Recording Studio |
|---|---|
| Ric Santos | Cinema-Audio |
| Best Pressing Plant | Record Company of the Year |
| Home Industries Development Corporation | Wilear's Records |

=== Packaging and notes ===
| Best Album Cover (LP) | Best Album Cover (Mini-Album) | Best Album Liner Notes |
|---|---|---|
| I'm Sorry My Love | Baby Vi | I'm Sorry My Love – Oskar Salazar |

=== Special awards ===
| Best Special Recording | Posthumous Award | Special Citation |
|---|---|---|
| "Philippine Rondalla" – Philippine Rondalla | Frankie Martin; Santiago Suarez | DZTM; DZTR; Gloria Sevilla; Tower Productions |
