= The Phenomenal Nora Aunor =

Studio album by Nora Aunor
- Released: 1970
- Genre: Adult Contemporary, Pop, Southern Gospel
- Language: English
- Label: Alpha Records Corporation (Philippines)

Nora Aunor chronology
Pledging My Love (1970)	The Phenomenal Nora Aunor (1970)	Christmas with Nora Aunor (1970)

Singles from The Phenomenal Nora Aunor
- 1. "Yesterday When I was Young"; 2. "Forever Loving You"; 3. "Tomorrow's Love"; 4. "It Is No Secret"; 5. "Two People"; 6. "Cry Cry No More"

The Phenomenal Nora Aunor is the last non-holiday studio album by Filipino singer-actress Nora Aunor from 1970 released by Alpha Records Corporation in the Philippines in LP format and later released in 1999 in a compilation/ cd format. The album contains 12 tracks including some her most famous songs like Yesterday When I was Young, Forever Loving You and Tomorrow's Love.

== Track listing ==
=== Side one ===
No.	Title	Writer(s)	Length
1.	"Forever Loving You"		03:03
2.	"Yesterday When I was Young"	Charles Aznavour	03:54
3.	"I Look at the Rain"
4.	"Cry Cry No More"		02:40
5.	"This is How My World Is Made"		02:53
6.	"Am I That Easy to Forget"	Carl Belew, W.S. Stevenson	02:32

=== Side two ===
No.	Title	Writer(s)	Length
1.	"Tomorrow's Love"		02:54
2.	"I'm So Happy"		02:33
3.	"Two People"		03:50
4.	"Love Time"	George Canseco, Robert Medina	01:30
5.	"Better Say Goodbye"	George Canseco, Robert Medina	02:35
6.	"It Is No Secret"	Stuart Hamblen	04:15

== Album Credits ==
Arranged and Conducted by:

- Doming Valdez
  - Forever Loving You
  - Yesterday When I was young
  - Look at the Rain
  - Tomorrows Love
  - This is How My World is Made
  - Two People
- Danny Subido
  - Cry Cry No More
  - Am I that Easy to Forget
  - Im so Happy
  - It is No Secret

Arranged and Supervised by:

- Danny Subido
  - Missing You
  - Prisoner of My Eyes

Recording Supervisor

- Jose Mari Gonzales

Recording Engineer

- Ric Santos
