= Don't You Believe It =

Single by Andy Williams
- B-side: "Summertime"
- Released: September 1962
- Genre: Easy listening
- Length: 2:27
- Label: Columbia 42523
- Songwriters: Burt Bacharach, Bob Hilliard
- Producer: Robert Mersey

Andy Williams singles chronology
"Stranger on the Shore" (1962)	"Don't You Believe It" (1962)	"Can't Get Used to Losing You" (1962)

"Don't You Believe It" is a song written by Burt Bacharach and Bob Hilliard and recorded by Andy Williams. Released as a single, the B-side was a cover of the George Gershwin song "Summertime".

== Chart performance ==
The song reached No. 15 on the Billboard Easy Listening chart and No. 39 on the Hot 100 in 1962.
