= Moonlight Becomes You (song) =

1942 song by Johnny Burke, Jimmy Van Heusen

Single by Bing Crosby
- B-side: "Constantly"
- Published: October 2, 1942 by Famous Music Corp., New York
- Released: November 19, 1942
- Recorded: June 12, 1942
- Studio: Decca Recording Studio, Los Angeles, California
- Length: 3:09
- Label: Decca 18513
- Composer: Jimmy Van Heusen
- Lyricist: Johnny Burke

Bing Crosby singles chronology
"White Christmas" (1942)	"Moonlight Becomes You" (1942)	"Sunday, Monday, or Always" (1943)

"Moonlight Becomes You" is a popular song composed by Jimmy Van Heusen with lyrics by Johnny Burke. The song was written for the Paramount Pictures release Road to Morocco (1942) and published in 1942 in connection with the film. Vic Schoen (staff arranger for Paramount) wrote the arrangement.

The song has been recorded many times, becoming a standard, but the recording by Bing Crosby on June 12, 1942 is the best known. This topped the Billboard charts in 1942 and spent a total of 17 weeks in the lists.

== Other recordings ==
- Chet Baker covered the tune in his album The Trumpet Artistry of Chet Baker (1955).
- Ella Fitzgerald – Verve release Get Happy! (1959), with Herb Ellis on guitar and Lou Levy on piano.
- Engelbert Humperdinck on his album The Very Thought of You (1995).
- Frank Sinatra recorded the song for his Moonlight Sinatra album (1966).
- Nora Aunor – her winning song in 1967 Tawag ng Tanghalan Championship.
- Glenn Miller Orchestra – their 1942 recording reached No. 5 in the Billboard charts the same year.
- Bobby Hackett – 1965 album of the same name.
- Harry James and His Orchestra – their recording reached No. 15 in the Billboard charts in 1942.

== Popular culture ==
- A clip of the song by Julie Morgan was also featured in Star Trek: First Contact, also a Paramount film.
- The Glenn Miller Orchestra version of the song. sung by Skip Nelson, is featured in a dance sequence in the New York City immersive theater production Sleep No More.
- Becker and an old lady sing it together at the end of the episode "Love! Lies! Bleeding!"
- The Caretaker (James Leyland Kirby) samples a cover of the song by Carroll Gibbons in his 2008 album Persistent Repetition of Phrases in the track "Von Restorff Effect"
