= George Canseco =

Filipino composer (1934–2004)

- Born: George Masangkay Canseco; April 23, 1934; Naic, Cavite, Philippine Islands
- Died: November 19, 2004 (aged 70) National Kidney Institute, Quezon City, Philippines
- Genres: Tagalog and English Pop Songs
- Occupation: Composer
- Years active: 1972–2004
- Labels: Vicor Music Corporation Recording Labels; Star Music (music rights)

Member of the Quezon City Council from the 1st District
- In office June 30, 1998 – June 30, 2001
- In office February 2, 1988 – June 30, 1992

George Masangkay Canseco (April 23, 1934 – November 19, 2004) was a Filipino composer and former politician. He composed numerous popular Filipino songs.

== Early years and education ==
Canseco studied and graduated with a Liberal Arts degree at University of the East in the Philippines. After graduation, he worked for The Philippines Herald and The Associated Press as a journalist. He also freelanced as a scriptwriter for hire in Manila. Canseco was commissioned by former Philippines First lady, Imelda Marcos, to compose the national tribute hymn, "Ako ay Pilipino".

== Later career ==
Canseco wrote the classic "Kapantay ay Langit", a theme from the award-winning Motion Picture sung by Amapola. It was later popularized by Pilita Corrales, which eventually became her signature song. It also had an English version titled "You're All I Love" that was sung by American singer Vic Dana that included some Tagalog lines. The song won the Manila Film Festival Best Song Of The Year Award in 1972. Canseco followed it with an English song entitled "Songs" exclusively for "Songs and Amapola" under the Vicor Music Corporation Pioneer Label. Canseco's best-known composition was "Ngayon at Kailanman", released in 1977 and sang by Basil Valdez. He wrote for Pilita Corrales (Kapantay ay Langit, My Daughter), Sharon Cuneta (Langis at Tubig, Dear Heart, PS I Love You, My Only Love, Kahapon Lamang, High School Life, etc.), Basil Valdez (Kastilyong Buhangin, Ngayon, Hanggang sa Dulo ng Walang Hanggan, Kung Ako'y Iiwan Mo, Paano ba Ang Mangarap, Gaano Kadalas Ang Minsan, Salamin ng Buhay, Minsan Pa Nating Hagkan Ang Nakaraan, etc.), Kuh Ledesma (Dito Ba, Paano Kita Mapasasalamatan, Wakas, Ako ay Pilipino, Sana Bukas Pa Ang Kahapon, Mayroong Sa'yo'y Nagmamahal, etc.), Dulce (Panata, Ako Ang Nagwagi, Ako Ang Nasawi), Tillie Moreno (Saan Ako Nagkamali), Leah Navarro (Kailangan Kita), Raymond Lauchengco (Saan Darating Ang Umaga), and Zsa Zsa Padilla (Hiram, Hinanap-hanap). His songs were also recorded by Nora Aunor, Regine Velasquez, Gary Valenciano, Martin Nievera, Sarah Geronimo and Donna Cruz, to name a few.

Canseco credited film producer and Vicor Music Corporation owner Vic del Rosario for his biggest break in the music industry. Canseco was elected President of the Filipino Society of Composers, Authors and Publishers, Inc. from 1988–1994; he also served as Director in 1973, 1986, and 1987. He was also elected councilor for the First District of Quezon City from 1988–1992 and 1998–2001.

== Death ==
On November 19, 2004, Canseco died due to cancer at the age of 70 in the National Kidney Institute, Quezon City, Philippines.

== Filmography ==
Composer

- Kapantay Ay Langit (1971)
- Babalik Ka Rin (1973)
- Magsikap: Kayod sa Araw, Kayod sa Gabi (1974)
- Vilma and the Beep Beep Minica (1974)
- Ang Inyong Linkod—Matutina (1975)
- Hello, Goodnight, Goodbye (1975)
- Niño Valiente (1975)
- Batu-Bato sa Langit: Ang Tamaa'y Huwag Magagalit (1975)
- Saan Ka Pupunta, Miss Lutgarda Nicolas? (1975)
- Hugasan Mo ang Aking Kasalaman (1976)
- Mrs. Eva Fonda, 16 (1976)
- Wanted ... Ded or Alayb (1976)
- May Langit ang Bawat Nilikha (1976)
- Mga Rosas sa Putikan (1976)
- Hinog sa Pilit (1976)
- Malvarosa (1976)
- Makamandag si Adora (1976)
- Hagdan-Hagdan ang Daan sa Langit (1976)
- Pang Umaga, Pang Tanghali, Pang Gabi (1977)
- Ang Diwata (1977)
- Bawat Himaymay ng Aking Laman (1977)
- Dalagang Ina (1977)
- Burlesk Queen (1977)
- Bakit Kailangan Kita (1978)
- Hubad sa Mundo (1978)
- Doble Kara (1978)
- Mananayaw (1978)
- Sa Lungga ng mga Daga (1978)
- Topo-Topo Barega (1978)
- Isang Gabi sa Iyo... Isang Gabi sa Akin (1978)
- Pagputi ng Uwak... Pag-itim ng Tagak (1978)
- Miss Dulce Amor, Ina (1978)
- Kukulog, Kikidlat sa Tanghaling Tapat (1978)
- Lalaki, Ikaw ang Dahilan (1978)
- Dyesebel (1978)
- Kid Kaliwete (1978)
- Katawang Alabok (1978)
- Atsay (1978)
- Huwag, Bayaw (1979)
- Coed (1979)
- Menor de Edad (1979)
- Biyak na Manyika (1979)
- Huwag (1979)
- Hiwaga (1979)
- Pag-ibig, Bakit Ka Ganyan? (1979)
- Aliw (1979)
- Star (1979)
- Kadete (1979)
- Nakaw na Pag-ibig (1980)
- Miss X (1980)
- Pagbabalik ng mga Tigre (1980)
- Bubot na Bayabas (1980)
- Kastilyong Buhangin (1980)
- Lumakad Kang Hubad... sa Mundong Ibabaw (1980)
- Broken Home (1980)
- Langis at Tubig (1980)
- Kung Ako'y Iiwan Mo (1980)
- Brutal (1980)
- High School Scandal (1981)
- Ang Babaing Hinugot sa Aking Tadyang (1981)
- Flor de Liza (1981)
- Hari ng Stunt (1981)
- Legs Katawan Babae (1981)
- Dear Heart (1981)
- Bawal (1981)
- P.S. I Love You (1981)
- My Only Love (1982)
- Magkano ... ang Kalayaan Mo (1982)
- Mga Uod at Rosas (1982)
- Forgive and Forget (1982)
- Alyas Palos Ii (1982)
- Sinasamba Kita (1982)
- Cross My Heart (1982)
- Lalake Ako (1982)
- Gaano Kadalas ang Minsan? (1982)
- Bambang (1982)
- Moral (1982)
- Mga Alagad ng Kuwadradong Mesa (1983)
- Friends in Love (1983)
- Palabra de Honor (1983)
- Sana Bukas Pa ang Kahapon (1983)
- Paano Ba ang Mangarap? (1983)
- Pieta (1983)
- To Love Again (1983)
- Sa Bawat Tunog ng Kampana (1983)
- Saan Darating ang Umaga? (1983)
- Minsan Pa Nating Hagkan ang Nakaraan (1983)
- Dugong Buhay (1983)
- Laruan (1983)
- Pieta: Ikalawang Aklat (1984)
- Dapat Ka Bang Mahalin? (1984)
- Apoy sa Iyong Kandungan (1984)
- Daddy's Little Darlings (1984)
- Piesta (1984)
- Somewhere (1984)
- Sampung Ahas ni Eva (1984)
- Minanong Magat (1984)
- Sa Hirap at Ginhawa (1984)
- Muntinlupa (1984)
- Isla (1985)
- Muling Buksan ang Puso (1985)
- Tinik sa Dibdib (1985)
- Kailan Sasabihing Mahal Kita (1985)
- Paradise Inn (1985)
- Bomba Arienda (1985)
- Kailan Tama ang Mali (1986)
- Iyo ang Tondo Kanya ang Cavite (1986)
- Magdusa Ka! (1986)
- Huwag Mong Itanong Kung Bakit (1986)
- Kung Aagawin Mo ang Lahat sa Akin (1987)
- Saan Nagtatago ang Pag-ibig? (1987)
- Paano Tatakasan ang Bukas? (1988)
- Langit at Lupa (1988)
- Babangon Ako't Dudurugin Kita (1989)
- Ang Babaeng Nawawala sa Sarili (1989)
- Imortal (1989)
- Ngayon at Kailanman (1992)
- Ikaw (1993)
- Paano ang Ngayon Kung Wala ang Kahapon (1995)
- Muling Ibalik ang Tamis ng Pag-ibig (1998)

== Awards ==
Year	Awards
2005	Presidential Medal of Merit (awarded posthumously)
1990-1996	Recipient of Five Lifetime Achievement Awards from METROPOP, AWIT AWARDS, KATHA, PARI, and STAR
1996	Best Original Song in the Film Academy of the Philippines Awards for the movie “Paano Ang Ngayon Kung Wala Ang Kahapon”.
1996	Best Musical Score in the Film Academy of the Philippines Awards for the movie “Paano Ang Ngayon Kung Wala Ang Kahapon”.
1992	Best Original Song in the Film Academy of the Philippines Awards for the movie “Hihintayin Kita Sa Langit”.
1989	Best Theme Song Award, “Imortal” sung by Basil Valdez, Metro Manila Film Festival.
1989	1st Yamaha World Song Festival Award collaborating with Mike Velarde as lyricist for the song, “As Long As Forever” sung by Merci Molina.
1989	Best Musical Director Award, for the movie, “Imortal” Metro Manila Film Festival.
1989	Best Original Song in the Film Academy of the Philippines Awards for the movie “Misis Mo, Misis Ko”.
1989	Best Musical Score in the Film Academy of the Philippines Awards for the movie “Paano Tatakasan Ang Bukas”.
1988	FAMAS Hall of Fame Awardee for Best Musical Scoring Category
1987	FAMAS Hall of Fame Awardee for Best Theme Song Category
1987	Star Awards Movie Theme Song of the Year, “ Hiram” sung by Zsazsa Padilla.
1987	FAMAS Best Musical Scoring for the movie, “Palimos ng Pag-ibig”
1984	Song of the Year Award in the 3rd Cecil Awards for the song, “Gaano Kadalas Ang Minsan” sung by Basil Valdez.
1984	FAMAS Best theme Song Award for “Dapat Ka Bang Mahalin?” sung by Sharon Cuneta.
1983	Best Original Song written for Motion Picture, T.V., or Radio in the 2nd Cecil Awards for the song “Sinasamba Kita” sung by Rey Valera
1983	FAMAS Best Theme Song Award for “Paano Ba Ang Mangarap?” interpreted by Basil Valdez.
1983	Best Original Song in the Film Academy of the Philippines Awards for the movie, “Sinasamba Kita”.
1982	FAMAS Best Musical Director Award for the movie, “Gaano Kadalas Ang Minsan?”
1982	FAMAS Best Theme Song Award for “Gaano Kadalas Ang Minsan?” sung by Basil Valdez
1982	Best Song Award written for Motion Picture, T.V., or Radio in the 1st Cecil Awards for the song, “Langis At Tubig” sung by Sharon Cuneta.
1980	FAMAS Best Theme Song Award for “Langis At Tubig” by Sharon Cuneta.
1980	FAMAS Best Musical Director Award for the movie, “Miss X” which starred Ms. Vilma Santos.
1979	Artistic Achievement Award in the Pacific Song Contest in Sydney, Australia for the song,” Ngayon”, interpreted by Basil Valdez.
1979	FAMAS Best Theme Song Award, “Huwag!” sung by Imelda Papin.
1979	Grand Prize Winner in the Likha Awit Pambata Songwriting Contest for the song, “Ngayon” sung by Basil Valdez.
1979	FAMAS Best Musical Director Award for the movie, “Huwag Bayaw!”.
1979	Grand Prize Winner in the World Song Festival in Hongkong for the song, “Ako Ang Nasawi, Ako Ang Nagwagi” sung by Dulce.
1979	Best Musical Director Award in the 4th Metro Manila Film Festival for the movie, ”Atsay”.
1978	FAMAS Best Musical Director Award for the movie, “Pagputi ng Uwak, Pag-itim ng Tagak”.
1978	Best Musical Director Award from the Movie Film Festival for the movie, “Burlesk Queen”.
1975	Best Musical Director Award in the 3rd Metro Manila Film Festival for the movie, “ Bato-Bato Sa Langit”.
1974	Philippine Association of National Advertisers (PANA) Awards for the Ad jingles of Hope cigarette and PS Bank.
1971	Best Theme Song Award in the 6th Metro Manila Film Festival for the song, “Kapantay Ay Langit” by Amapola.
1970	Golden Record Award for the song, “Rain” by Boy Mondragon.
1969	Awit Awards Best Composer, Best Lyricist and Song of the Year for the song,” True Love Came Too Late” by Merci Molina.
1969	Awit Awards Best Composer and Best Lyricist for the song, “Forbidden” by Norma Ledesma.
