= 1st Philippine Arts, Film and Television Awards =

Annual Filipino film awards ceremony

- Date: February 21, 2026
- Site: Centennial Hall, Manila Hotel, Manila, Philippines
- Hosted by: Ara Mina; Gelo Buencamino

Highlights
- Best Film: Balota
- Best Drama Series: FPJ's Batang Quiapo
- Best Musical or Comedy Series: Bubble Gang
- Most awards: Film: Balota (5); TV: Batang Quiapo (2); It's Showtime (2)
- Most nominations: Film: Green Bones (13); TV: Batang Quiapo (2); It's Showtime (2)

The 1st Philippine Arts, Film and Television Awards was the inaugural award ceremony hosted on February 21, 2026 by the Philippine Academy, Film and Television, Inc., which honored the best Filipino films and television series of 2024. The ceremony was conducted by Billy James Uy (Chairman of the Board), Teresita Tolentino Pambuan (President), Christina Aliada (Executive Vice President), and Charlomagne Vales Arceta (Vice President and Founder) at Centennial Hall of the Manila Hotel, Manila.

Balota was the biggest winner of the night for film with 5 wins while Green Bones was the most nominated movie with 13 nominations. Dennis Trillo won Best Actor while Marian Rivera and Rebecca Chuaunsu tied for Best Actress. Gabby Ramos won Best Director for When Magic Hurts.

FPJ's Batang Quiapo and It's Showtime tied with the most wins and nominations in television with 2 each on respective categories with the former winning for Best Drama Series and the latter won for Best Noontime Show. Coco Martin won Best Drama Actor and Carla Abellana won for Best Drama Actress in a television series. Bubble Gang won for Best Comedy Show.

== Winners and nominees ==
The following are the winners and nominations for the 1st PAFTA Awards, covering films and television released in 2024.

Winners are listed first and indicated in bold.

=== Film ===
Best Film	Best Director
**Balota**; Green Bones; Her Locket; Hello, Love, Again; When Magic Hurts; Uninvited	**Gabby Ramos – When Magic Hurts**; JE Tiglao – Her Locket; Kip Oebanda – Balota; Zig Dulay – Green Bones; Cathy Garcia-Sampana – Hello, Love, Again; Dan Villegas – Uninvited
Best Actor	Best Actress
**Dennis Trillo – Green Bones**; Alden Richards – Hello, Love, Again; Piolo Pascual – The Kingdom; Kelvin Miranda – Chances Are, You and I; Kokoy de Santos – Your Mother Son; Carlo Aquino – Crosspoint; Arjo Atayde – Toppak; Vice Ganda – And the Breadwinner Is...	**Marian Rivera – Balota** and **Rebecca Chuaunsu – Her Locket**; Kathryn Bernardo – Hello, Love, Again; Mylene Dizon – The Hearing; Aicelle Santos – Isang Himala; Julia Montes – Pula; Vilma Santos – Uninvited; Lovi Poe – Guilty Pleasure
Best Supporting Actor	Best Supporting Actress
**Will Ashley – Balota**; Ruru Madrid – Green Bones; Jeric Raval – Mamay: A Journey to Greatness; Aga Muhlach – Uninvited; Sid Lucero – The Kingdom; Joel Torre – Under A Piaya Moon	**Gabby Padilla – Uninvited**; Eugene Domingo – And the Breadwinner Is...; Alessandra de Rossi – Green Bones; Kakki Teodoro – Isang Himala; Nadine Lustre – Uninvited; Claudine Barretto – When Magic Hurts
Best Child Actor	Best Child Actress
**Enzo Osorio – The Hearing**; Euwenn Mikaell – Lolo and the Kid; Zion Cruz – The Kingdom	**Elia Ilano – Nanay Tatay**; Xia Vigor – Itutumba Ka ng Tatay Ko; Sienna Stevens – Green Bones
Best Producer	Best Documentary Film
**ABS-CBN and GMA Pictures for Hello, Love, Again**	**No Man Left Behind**
Best Inspirational Film	Best Short Film
**Mamay: A Journey to Greatness**	**As the Moth Flies**

Film technical category

Best Screenplay	Best Original Story
**Anj Atienza and Ricky Lee – Green Bones**; Maze Miranda, J.E. Tiglao – Her Locket; Carlo Ledesma, Anton Santamaria – Outside; Crisanto Aquino – My Future You; Honeylyn Joy Alipio – The Hearing; Kip Oebanda – Balota	**Rebecca Chuaunsu – Her Locket**; Kip Oebanda – Balota; Joseph Conrad Rubio – Green Bones; Neal "Buboy" Tan – Mamay: A Journey to Greatness; Brillante Mendoza – Pula; Carlo Ledesma – Outside
Best Production Design	Best Cinematography
**Jed Sicanggco and Jerann Ordinario – Outside**; Eero Yves Francisco – Balota; Maolen Fadul – Green Bones; James Arvin Rosendal – Her Locket; Angel B. Diesta – Espantaho; Norico Santos – Hello Love Again	**Neil Daza – Green Bones**; Neil Daza – Espantaho; Carlo Mendoza – Isang Himala; Dan Villegas – Kono Basho; Shing-Fung Cheung – Outside; Shayne Sarte – The Kingdom
Best Editing	Best Visual Effects
**Lawrence Fajardo, Ysabelle Denoga – The Hearing**; Chuck Gutierrez – Balota; Benjamin Tolentino – Green Bones; Renard Torres – Her Locket; Mark Victor – Outside; Vanessa de Leon – My Future You	**Gaspar Mangarin and Walter Monte – Espantaho**; Dave Tolentino – Green Bones; Dave Tolentino – Isang Himala; Kono Basho; Mark Victor – Outside; Jay Santiago – The Kingdom
Best Sound	Best Original Theme Song
**Narra Post Production – Balota**; Albert Michael Idioma, Nicole Rosacay – Green Bones; Armand de Guzman – Her Locket; Mamay: A Journey to Greatness; Deo Van Fidelson – Pula; Allen Roy Santos – Outside	**"Luha sa Dilim" by Yanco – Guilty Pleasure**; "Nyebe" by Pablo Nase – Green Bones; "Palagi" by TJ Monterde – Hello, Love, Again; "Ang Himala ay nasa Puso" by Vincent de Jesus, Ricky Lee – Isang Himala; "Hahamakin ang Lahat" by Quest – Uninvited; "Paruparo" by Jordan Ravanes – When Magic Hurts

=== Television ===
Best Drama Series	Best Drama Anthology
FPJ's Batang Quiapo	Magpakailanman
Best Drama Actor	Best Drama Actress
Coco Martin – FPJ's Batang Quiapo	Carla Abellana – Widows' War
Best Reality Show	Best Variety Show
Pinoy Big Brother: Celebrity Collab Edition 2.0	ASAP
Best Male TV Host	Best Female TV Host
Dingdong Dantes – Family Feud	Anne Curtis – It's Showtime
Best Comedy Show	Best Celebrity Talk Show
Bubble Gang	Fast Talk with Boy Abunda
Best Morning Show	Best Noontime Show
Unang Hirit	It's Showtime
Best News Program	Best Documentary
24 Oras	I-Witness
Best Station
GMA 7

=== Theater ===
Contemporary Theater Award	Musical Theater Award
**Walang Aray**	**One More Chance**
National Cultural Impact and Educational Theater Award	Performing Arts Recognition
**Juan Luna: Isang Sarsuela – Vince Tañada**	**Gerald Magallanes**
Rising Star of Stage Award	Promising Theater Artist
**Peter Parker Tañada**	**Manwyn San Pedro Valencia – Awin**

Special Awards

- Modern Grand Slam Best Actress Award: Marian Rivera
- Icon of Philippine Cinema: Vilma Santos
- Iconic Film Performance Award: Judy Ann Santos
- Box Office Star: Alden Richards and Kathryn Bernardo
- Special Citation for Global Excellence Award: SB19
- Youth Icon Award: Andres Muhlach and Kai Montinola
- Breakthrough Performance: Euwenn Mikaell
- Most Promising Star: Kian Co
- Journalism Lifetime Achievement Award: Kapuso Mo, Jessica Soho
- Excellence in Business News Award: Agenda

Post-humous Awards

- Nora Aunor and Gloria Romero
