= 41st PMPC Star Awards for Movies =

2024 Philippine Movie Press Club awards

41st Star Awards for Movies
- Date: November 30, 2025
- Site: San Juan Theater, San Juan City Metro Manila
- Hosted by: Gladys Reyes; Marlo Mortel; CJ Opiaza

Highlights
- Best Picture: Uninvited; AbeNida (Indie)
- Most awards: Uninvited (6)
- Most nominations: Green Bones (17)

The 41st PMPC Star Awards for Movies by the Philippine Movie Press Club (PMPC) honored outstanding achievements in Philippine cinema for films released in 2024. The ceremony took place on November 30, 2025 at the San Juan Theater, San Juan, Metro Manila.

The ceremony was hosted by Gladys Reyes, Marlo Mortel, and CJ Opiaza. Uninvited was the top winner of the night and received most of the awards, including Movie of the Year, Movie Director of the Year, Movie Ensemble Acting of the Year, Best Actor and Best Actress of the Year. Green Bones received most of the nominations. AbeNida was recognized as Indie Movie of the Year.

== Winners and nominees ==
The following are the nominations for the 41st PMPC Star Awards for Movies, covering films released in 2024.

Winners are listed first and indicated in bold.

=== Major categories ===
Movie of the Year	Indie Movie of the Year
Winner: **Uninvited** (Mentorque Productions, Project 8 Projects): Green Bones (GMA Films, GMA Public Affairs, BrightBurn Entertainment); Espantaho (Quantum Films, Cineko Productions, Purple Bunny Productions); Hello, Love, Again (Star Cinema ABS-CBN Film Productions, Inc., GMA Pictures); My Future You (Regal Entertainment, Inc); Un/Happy for You (Star Cinema ABS-CBN Film Productions); Topakk (Nathan Studios, Strawdogs Studio Production, Fusee); Isang Himala (UxS Inc., CreaZion Studios, Kapitol Films, CMB Film Service, Inc.)	Winner: **AbeNida** (BG Productions International): A Journey (Mavx Productions); Balota (Cinemalaya Foundation, GMA Pictures, GMA Entertainment Group, Film Development Council of the Philippines); Her Locket (Rebecca Chuaunsu Film Production, Rebelde Films); Huwag Mo ‘Kong Iwan (BenTria Productions); Moro (CenterStage Productions); Pushcart Tales (Puregold CinePanalo, WAF Studios); Under A Piaya Moon (Puregold CinePanalo, Bakunawa Films, Green Pelican Studios, Jungle Room Creatives, Cloudy Duck Pictures)
Movie Ensemble Acting of the Year	Indie Movie Ensemble Acting of the Year
Winner: **Uninvited**: Espantaho; Green Bones; Guilty Pleasure; Hello, Love, Again; Isang Himala; Topakk; Un/Happy For You	Winner: **Her Locket**: AbeNida; A Journey; Balota; Lola Magdalena; Love Child; Pushcart Tales; Your Mother’s Son
Movie Director of the Year	Indie Movie Director of the Year
Winner: **Dan Villegas** (Uninvited ): Jose Lorenzo Diokno (Isang Himala); Zig Dulay (Green Bones); Cathy Garcia-Sampana (Hello, Love, Again); Chito Roño (Espantaho); Petersen Vargas (Un/Happy for You); Crisanto Aquino (My Future You); Richard V. Somes (Topakk)	Winner: **Louie Ignacio** (AbeNida): Sigrid Andrea Bernardo (Pushcart Tales); RC Delos Reyes (A Journey); Joel Lamangan (Huwag Mo ‘Kong Iwan); Brillante Mendoza (Moro); Kip Oebanda (Balota); Kurt Soberano (Under A Piaya Moon); J. E. Tiglao (Her Locket)
Movie Actor of the Year	Movie Actress of the Year
Winner: Tied between **Aga Muhlach** (Uninvited) and **Dennis Trillo** (Green Bones): Arjo Atayde (Topakk); Seth Fedelin (My Future You); Joshua Garcia (Un/Happy For You); Baron Geisler (Moro); Piolo Pascual (Moro); Alden Richards (Hello, Love, Again)	Winner: **Vilma Santos** (Uninvited ): Kathryn Bernardo (Hello, Love, Again); Shamaine Buencamino (Pushcart Tales); Rebecca Chuaunsu (Her Locket); Lovi Poe (Guilty Pleasure); Sue Prado (Your Mother’s Son); Marian Rivera (Balota); Judy Ann Santos (Espantaho)
Movie Supporting Actor of the Year	Movie Supporting Actress of the Year
Winner: **Harvey Bautista** (Pushcart Tales): Nonie Buencamino (Un/Happy For You); Joross Gamboa (Hello, Love, Again); Sid Lucero (The Kingdom); Ruru Madrid (Green Bones); Khalil Ramos (Fuchsia Libre); Wendell Ramos (Green Bones); Joel Torre (Under A Piaya Moon)	Winner: **Sunshine Cruz** (Lola Magdalena): Perla Bautista (Lola Magdalena); Eugene Domingo (And The Breadwinner Is ...); Nadine Lustre (Uninvited); Gina Pareño (AbeNida); Chanda Romero (Espantaho); Kakki Teodoro (Isang Himala); Lorna Tolentino (Espantaho)
New Movie Actor of the Year	New Movie Actress of the Year
Winner:**Will Ashley** (Balota): Amado Arjay Babon (Phantosmia); Raheel Bhyria (Balota); Benedict Cua (Her Locket); KD Estrada (Fruitcake); Beaver Magtalas (When Magic Hurts); Aljon Mendoza (Un/Happy For You); Jeff Moses (Under A Piaya Moon); Luke James Alford (Maple Leaf Dreams); John Arcenas (Idol: The April Boy Regino Story)	Winner: **Kaila Estrada** (Un/Happy For You): Kei Kurosawa (Crosspoint); Queenay Mercado (Fruitcake); Isabelle Sophie Ng (Her Locket); Mutya Orquia (When Magic Hurts); Sofia Pablo (Green Bones); Bianca De Vera (Un/Happy For You); Pau Dimaranan (Under A Piaya Moon); Maxine Trinidad (When Magic Hurts); Kate Yalung (Idol: The April Boy Story)
Movie Child Performer of the Year
Winner: **Ryrie Sophia** (Mujigae): Sienna Stevens (Green Bones); Argus Aspiras (And the Breadwinner Is...); Kulot Caponpon (And the Breadwinner Is...); Kian Co (Espantaho); Zion Cruz (The Kingdom); Emman Esquivel (Kuman Thong); Althea Ruedas (Kuman Thong)

=== Technical categories ===
Movie Original Screenplay of the Year	Indie Movie Original Screenplay of the Year
Winner: **Ricky Lee** and **Anj Atienza** (Green Bones): Crisanto Aquino (My Future You); Dado Dayao (Uninvited); Ricky Lee, Jose Lorenzo Diokno (Isang Himala); Chris Martinez (Espantaho); Carmi Raymundo and Crystal San Miguel (Hello, Love, Again); Richard V. Somes, Jimmy Flores, and Wil Fredo Manalang (Topakk)	Winner: **Dennis Evangelista** (Lola Magdalena): Ralston Jover (AbeNida); Jun Robles Lana and Elmer Gatchalian (Your Mother’s Son); Kip Oebanda (Balota); Eric Ramos (Huwag Mo ‘Kong Iwan); J. E. Tiglao, Maze Miranda (Her Locket); Honeylyn Joy Alipio (Moro)
Movie Cinematographer of the Year	Indie Movie Cinematographer of the Year
Winner: **Pao Orendain** (Uninvited): Louie Quirino (Topakk); Noel Teehankee (Hello, Love, Again); Noel Teehankee (Un/Happy For You); Neil Daza (Espantaho); Neil Daza (Green Bones); Carlo Mendoza (Isang Himala)	Winner: **Dan Villegas** (Kono Basho): Nathan Bringuer (Under A Piaya Moon); Tey Clamor (Balota); Jag Concepcion (Her Locket); Odyssey Flores (Moro); T.M. Malones (AbeNida); Tom Redoble (A Journey)
Movie Production Designer of the Year	Indie Movie Production Designer of the Year
Winner: **Mic Tatad King** (Uninvited): Nestor Abrogena (The Kingdom); Angel Diesta (Espantaho); Marxie Maolen Fadul (Green Bones); Ericson Navarro (Isang Himala); Norico Santos (Hello, Love, Again); Richard V. Somes (Topakk)	Winner: **Brillante Mendoza** (Moro): Eero Yves Francisco (Balota); Cyrus Khan (AbeNida); Roy Roger Requejo (Your Mother’s Son); James Rosendal (Her Locket); Jed Sicangco and Jerann Ordinario (Outside); Jed Sicangco and Kurt Soberano (Under A Piaya Moon)
Movie Editor of the Year	Indie Movie Editor of the Year
Winner: **Benjamin Tolentino** (Green Bones): Vanessa Ubas De Leon (My Future You); Jaime Dumancas (Topakk); Benjo Ferrer (Espantaho); Marya Ignacio (Hello, Love, Again); Marya Ignacio (Uninvited); Benjamin Tolentino (Isang Himala)	Winner: **Gilbert Obispo** (AbeNida): Ysabelle Denoga (Moro); Chuck Gutierrez (Balota); Marya Ignacio (Kono Basho); John Paul Somera Ponce (Love Child); Benjamin Tolentino (Your Mother’s Son); Renard Torres (Her Locket)
Movie Musical Scorer of the Year	Indie Movie Musical Scorer of the Year
Winner: **Vincent de Jesus** (Isang Himala): Jose Antonio Buencamino (Topakk); Len Calvo (Green Bones); Len Calvo (Uninvited); Von de Guzman (Espantaho); Jessie Lasaten (Hello, Love, Again); Ammie Ruth Suarez (Un/Happy For You)	Winner: **Divino Letada Dayacap** (Her Locket): Jake Abella (AbeNida); Jake Abella (Moro); Von De Guzman (Huwag Mo ‘Kong Iwan); Jessie Lasaten (A Journey); Peter Joseph Legaste and Joaquin Santos (The Hearing); Emerzon Texon (Balota)
Movie Sound Engineer of the Year	Indie Movie Sound Engineer of the Year
Winner: **Albert Michael Idioma** and **Andrea Teresa Idioma** (Topakk): Lamberto Casas and Alex Tomboc (Espantaho); Albert Michael Idioma and Emilio Bien Sparks (Isang Himala); Albert Michael Idioma and Jannina Mikaela Minglanilla (The Kingdom); Albert Michael Idioma and Nicole Rosacay (Green Bones); Narubeth Peemya (Hello, Love, Again); Roy Santos (Uninvited)	Winner: **Allen Roy Santos** (Outside): Armand De Guzman (Her Locket); Paolo Estero (Huwag Mo ‘Kong Iwan); Albert Michael Idioma and Nicole Rosacay (Balota); Gilbert Obispo (AbeNida); Roem Ortiz (Under A Piaya Moon)
Movie Original Theme Song of the Year	Indie Movie Original Theme Song of the Year
Winner: **“Ang Himala Ay Nasa Puso”** – interpreted by Juan Karlos, composed and arranged by Vincent De Jesus (Isang Himala): “Darkness Calls” – interpreted, composed, and arranged by Basti Artadi (Topakk); “Hahamakin Ang Lahat” – interpreted by KZ Tandingan and Arthur Nery, written by Quest and Arthur Nery (Uninvited); “Laban Fighting” – interpreted by Alexa Ilacad, lyrics by James Ladioray, composed by Kahlil Refuerzo and RG Alegado (Mujigae); “Lihim” – interpreted by mrld, composed by Meriel T. De Jesus, produced and arranged by Thyro Alfaro, mixed and mastered by Hazel Pascua (Men Are From Quezon City, Women Are From Alabang); “Luha Sa Dilim” – interpreted by Yanco, composed and arranged by Julian Juangco (Guilty Pleasure); “Magkabilaan (The Kingdom Version)” – interpreted by Zephanie & Apoc, words and music by Joey Ayala & Ralph dela Fuente, additional music by Antonina Rodriguez, lyrics by Apoc (The Kingdom)	Winner: **“Hamon”** – interpreted by Gerald Santos, composed and arranged by Vehnee Saturno (Mamay: A Journey To Greatness): “Mahal Kita” – interpreted by VJ Mendoza, composed and arranged by Macky Alca (Road To Happy); “Nasa Bawat Mong Hakbang” – interpreted by Ato Arman, composed by Albert Velez, arranged by Abet Alfonso (Haligi); “Paruparo” – interpreted by Kate Irish, composed by Kate Irish Villanueva, arranged by Jordan Ravanes (When Magic Hurts); “Babalik Ka Na” – interpreted, composed, and arranged by Divino Letada Dayacap (Her Locket); “Sa Likod Ng Tagumpay” – interpreted by JC Regino, composed by Cresenciano Ramos a.k.a. Boy Kristopher (Idol: The April Boy Regino Story); “Will You Still Love Me” – interpreted, composed, and arranged by Myka Magsaysay-Sigua (Outside)

=== Short films ===
Short Film Movie of the Year	Short Film Movie Director of the Year
Winner: **Ka Benjie** (Puregold CinePanalo, 2minDig Productions): Huling Sayaw Ni Erlinda (Rems Entertainment Production); Kita Mo ‘To? (Ko-Leksyon Production, Kuro-Kuro Production); Lumang Tugtugin (The Manila Film Festival, UxS Inc., KreativeDen Entertainment, Kaptiol Films); May At Nila (The Manila Film Festival, Anima Studios Production, KreativeDen Entertainment); Sa Oras Ng Paghukom (Mapua University, Humantao Films, Kuro-Kuro Productions, Arrowhead, Gate 11 Productions); Shortest Day, Longest Night (The Manila Film Festival, Anima Studios Production, KreativeDen Entertainment, Narra Post Production Studios); Si Balong At Si Doro (Hundred Islands Film Festival, Alaminos City LGU, Alaminos City Tourism Office, NCCA, FDCP)	Winner: **Sigrid Andrea Bernardo** (May At Nila): Alexa Moneii Agaloos (Ka Benjie); Jose Lorenzo Diokno (Lumang Tugtugin; Adam Dumaguin (Kita Mo ‘To?); JP Habac (Shortest Day, Longest Night); Miguel Potestades (Ang Huling Liham); Gabby Ramos (Huling Sayaw Ni Erlinda); Sean Romero (Sa Oras Ng Paghukom)

== Special awards ==
Darling of the Press	Movie Loveteam of the Year
Winner: Cecille Bravo: Kim Chiu; Rez Cortez; Baby Go; Martin Nievera; Imelda Papin; Piolo Pascual; Gladys Reyes	Winner: Francine Diaz and Seth Fedelin (My Future You): Kathryn Bernardo and Alden Richards (Hello, Love, Again); Joshua Garcia and Julia Barretto (Un/Happy For You); Beaver Magtalas and Mutya Orquia (When Magic Hurts); Heaven Peralejo and Joshua Garcia (Fruitcake); Maris Racal and Anthony Jennings (And The Breadwinner Is...); LA Santos and Kira Balinger (Maple Leaf Dreams)

- Nora Aunor Ulirang Artista Lifetime Achievement Award - Alma Moreno and Ramon “Bong” Revilla, Jr.
- Ulirang Alagad Ng Pelikula Sa Likod Ng Kamera Lifetime Achievement Award - Jesse Ejercito
- Takilya King of the Year - Alden Richards for Hello, Love, Again
- Takilya Queen of the Year - Kathryn Bernardo for Hello, Love, Again
- Ethel Ramos Dean’s Lister Lifetime Achievement Award - Mercy Lejarde and Crispina Belen
- Male Star of The Night - Dennis Trillo
- Female Star of The Night - Vilma Santos
