= 2024 Metro Manila Film Festival =

50th edition of annual Philippine festival

2024 Metro Manila Film Festival 50th Metro Manila Film Festival
- No. of films: 10
- Festival date: December 25, 2024 to January 14, 2025

MMFF chronology
- 51st ed. 49th ed.

The 2024 Metro Manila Film Festival (MMFF) was held from December 25, 2024 to January 14, 2025 as the 50th edition of the annual Metro Manila Film Festival. During the festival, no foreign films are shown in Philippine theaters (excluding IMAX and 4D theaters).

== Entries ==
=== Feature films ===
The first five official entries were announced on July 16, 2024, at the Bulwagang Villegas at the Manila City Hall, selected from 39 scripts submitted by production companies. Metropolitan Manila Development Authority chairman Don Artes revealed during the press conference that the 50th edition theme is called "Sinesigla sa Singkwenta" which highlights this year's festival featuring 10 competing entries with various genres, instead of the usual eight entries. The second batch of films was announced on October 22, 2024. This was chosen among the finished films submitted on or before September 30, 2024.

Most entries were given the Parental Guidance rating by the Movie and Television Review and Classification Board. My Future You were deemed fitted for a general audience, Strange Frequencies: Taiwan Killer Hospital were classified as R-13 rating, while the film festival's two thriller films Topakk and Uninvited where given the R-16 rating.

Title	Starring	Production company	Director	Genre	Ref
First batch
And the Breadwinner Is...	Vice Ganda, Eugene Domingo, Gladys Reyes, Jhong Hilario, Maris Racal, Anthony Jennings	Star Cinema, The IdeaFirst Company	Jun Lana	Comedy, Family	
Green Bones	Dennis Trillo, Ruru Madrid	GMA Pictures	Zig Dulay	Suspense, Drama	
Isang Himala	Aicelle Santos, Bituin Escalante	Kapitol Films, UXS	Pepe Diokno	Musical	
The Kingdom	Vic Sotto, Piolo Pascual	APT Entertainment, Mzet Productions, MQuest Ventures	Michael Tuviera	Action, Family, Drama	
Strange Frequencies: Taiwan Killer Hospital	Enrique Gil, Jane De Leon, Alexa Miro	Reality MM Studios	Kerwin Go	Horror	
Second batch
Espantaho	Judy Ann Santos, Lorna Tolentino	Quantum Films, Cineko Productions, Purple Bunny Productions	Chito S. Roño	Horror	
Hold Me Close	Carlo Aquino, Julia Barretto	Viva Films, Ninuno Media	Jason Paul Laxamana	Romance	
My Future You	Francine Diaz, Seth Fedelin	Regal Entertainment	Crisanto Aquino	Romantic comedy	
Topakk	Arjo Atayde, Julia Montes, Sid Lucero, Enchong Dee, Kokoy de Santos	Nathan Studios, Strawdog Studios, FUSEE	Richard Somes	Action, Thriller	
Uninvited	Vilma Santos, Nadine Lustre, Aga Muhlach	Mentorque Productions, Project 8 Projects	Dan Villegas	Thriller	

=== Student short film entries ===
In association with Film Development Council of the Philippines (FDCP), the agency is conducting the Student Short Film Competition, a platform designed to showcase young Filipino filmmakers. The announcement for the ten selected short films was scheduled on the second week of November.

Title	School	Director	Ref
50 BPM	De La Salle–College of Saint Benilde	Luke Remetre	
A Delivery Rider	City of Malabon University	Jennissie Gilbuena	
Fifty-Fifty	Bulacan State University	Laurence de Vera	
Ikalimampung Palapag	University of the Philippines Diliman	Kimi Ong, Ryuta Suwa, and Raina Vergara	
Inang Wak-wak	Mindanao State University–General Santos City	Drenzel Calopez	
Pabaon	STI College–Cainta	Desiree Anne de Belen	
PNB 12-50	University of the Philippines Mindanao	Ryan Paolo Resuena	
Saan Aabot Ang 50 Pesos Mo	University of Makati	Selina Claire Napano	
50lo Trip With Lolo Dan	University of the Philippines Diliman	Denbert Tiamzon and Jay-r Julio	
The 50th Soul	University of Makati	Raphael Jesse Tominez	

== Parade of Stars ==
The MMDA revealed the 12 km (7.5 mi) route of the 2:00 p.m. annual "Parade of Stars" on December 21 was held from the Kartilya ng Katipunan to the Manila Central Post Office.

== Awards ==
2024 Metro Manila Film Festival Gabi ng Parangal
- Date: December 27, 2024
- Site: Solaire Resort & Casino, Parañaque
- Hosted by: Robi Domingo, Gabbi Garcia, Jasmine Curtis-Smith, Tim Yap

Highlights
- Best Picture: Green Bones
- Best Director: Michael Tuviera (The Kingdom); Crisanto Aquino (My Future You)
- Best Actor: Dennis Trillo (Green Bones)
- Best Actress: Judy Ann Santos (Espantaho)
- Most awards: Green Bones (6)

Television coverage
- Channel: Prime TV
- Network: PRTV Prime Media

The Gabi ng Parangal (transl. Awards Night) of the 2024 Metro Manila Film Festival was held at the Solaire Resort & Casino in Parañaque, on December 27, 2024.

Jefrë designed the MMFF trophy featuring a silver figurine with an upper torso of film reel and filmstrip.

=== Major awards ===
Winners are listed first, highlighted in boldface, and indicated with a double dagger (‡). Nominations are also listed if applicable.

Best Picture	Best Director
**Green Bones – GMA Pictures, GMA Public Affairs**‡; The Kingdom – APT Entertainment, Mzet Productions, MediaQuest (2nd Best Picture); My Future You – Regal Entertainment (3rd Best Picture); Isang Himala – Kapitol Films, UXS (4th Best Picture)	**Michael Tuviera – The Kingdom** and **Crisanto Aquino – My Future You** (tie) ‡; Richard Somes – Topakk; Zig Dulay – Green Bones; Pepe Diokno – Isang Himala; Chito S. Roño – Espantaho
Best Actor	Best Actress
**Dennis Trillo – Green Bones**‡; Vice Ganda – And the Breadwinner Is...; Seth Fedelin – My Future You; Vic Sotto – The Kingdom; Piolo Pascual – The Kingdom; Arjo Atayde – Topakk	**Judy Ann Santos – Espantaho**‡; Aicelle Santos – Isang Himala; Francine Diaz – My Future You; Jane de Leon – Strange Frequencies: Taiwan Killer Hospital; Julia Montes – Topakk; Vilma Santos – Uninvited
Best Supporting Actor	Best Supporting Actress
**Ruru Madrid – Green Bones**‡; Sid Lucero – Topakk; Sid Lucero – The Kingdom; Jhong Hilario – And the Breadwinner Is...; Kokoy de Santos – And the Breadwinner Is...; David Ezra – Isang Himala	**Kakki Teodoro – Isang Himala**‡; Chanda Romero – Espantaho; Lorna Tolentino – Espantaho; Gabby Padilla – Uninvited; Nadine Lustre – Uninvited; Cristine Reyes – The Kingdom
Best Screenplay	Best Cinematography
**Ricky Lee and Angeli Atienza – Green Bones**‡; Chris Martinez – Espantaho; Ricky Lee and Pepe Diokno – Isang Himala; Crisanto Aquino – My Future You; Michelle Ngu-Nario – The Kingdom	**Neil Daza – Green Bones**‡; Neil Daza – Espantaho; Mark Tirona – Strange Frequencies: Taiwan Killer Hospital; Shayne Sarte – The Kingdom; Louie Quirino – Topakk; Pao Orendain – Uninvited
Best Production Design	Best Editing
**Nestor Abrogena – The Kingdom**‡; Angel Diesta – Espantaho; Maolen Fadul – Green Bones; Ericcson Navarro – Isang Himala; Jerann Ordinario – Strange Frequencies: Taiwan Killer Hospital; Richard Somes – Topakk	**Vanessa Ubas De Leon – My Future You**‡; Benjo Ferrer – Espantaho; Benjamin Tolentino – Green Bones; Kurt Claridades – Strange Frequencies: Taiwan Killer Hospital; Tara Illenberger – The Kingdom; Jamie Dumancas – Topakk
Best Sound	Best Original Theme Song
**Ditoy Aguila – Strange Frequencies: Taiwan Killer Hospital**‡; Alex Tomboc & Lamberto Casas Jr. – Espantaho; Albert Michael Idioma & Nicole Rosacay – Green Bones; Albert Michael Idioma and Emilio Bien Sparks – Isang Himala; Albert Michael M. Idioma, Janina Mikaela Minglanilla, Andrea Teresa T. Idioma, Jhon Eric Mancera, Donald Ilagan, Gerald Guardiano, Merlvin Rivera – Topakk	**"Ang Himala ay Nasa Puso" from Isang Himala – by Juan Karlos Labajo**‡; "Magkabilaan" from The Kingdom – by Zephanie Dimaranan and Apoc; "Darkness Calls" from Topakk – by Basti Artadi; "Hahamakin ang Lahat" from Uninvited – by KZ Tandingan and Arthur Nery
Best Musical Score	Best Visual Effects
**Vincent De Jesus – Isang Himala**‡; Von De Guzman – Espantaho; Len Calvo – Green Bones; Decky Jazer Margaja – Strange Frequencies: Taiwan Killer Hospital; Jessie Lassaten – The Kingdom; Jose Antonio Buencamino – Topakk	**Riot Inc. – The Kingdom**‡; Gaspar Mangarin and Walter Monte – Espantaho; Engine Room and Green Maya – Isang Himala; Santelmo Studio Inc. – My Future You; Mothership Inc. – Strange Frequencies: Taiwan Killer Hospital
Best Child Performer	Gatpuno Antonio J. Villegas Cultural Award
**Sienna Stevens – Green Bones**‡; Kean Co – Espantaho; Zion Cruz – The Kingdom	**The Kingdom**‡
Fernando Poe Jr. Memorial Award for Excellence	Best Float
**Topakk**‡; And the Breadwinner Is...; Green Bones; My Future You; The Kingdom	**Topakk** and **Uninvited** (tie) ‡; And the Breadwinner Is...; Espantaho; My Future You
Gender Sensitivity Award	Breakthrough Performance Award
**And the Breadwinner Is...**‡	**Seth Fedelin – My Future You**‡; Francine Diaz – My Future You; Alexa Miro – Strange Frequencies: Taiwan Killer Hospital

=== Other awards ===
- Lifetime Achievement Award – Joseph Estrada
- Special Jury Citation – Vice Ganda (And the Breadwinner Is...)
- Special Jury Prize – Topakk and Isang Himala

=== Student short film ===
Best Picture

- Saan Aabot Ang 50 Pesos Mo? – University of Makati (Best Picture)
- A Delivery Rider – City of Malabon University (2nd Best Picture)
- PNB 12–50– University of the Philippines Mindanao (3rd Best Picture)

Special Jury Prize

- Inang Wak-wak – Mindanao State University - General Santos

=== Multiple awards ===
Awards	Film
6	Green Bones
5	Isang Himala
5	The Kingdom
4	My Future You
3	Topakk
2	And the Breadwinner Is...

=== Multiple nominations ===
Awards	Film
16	The Kingdom
14	Espantaho
13	Topakk
12
12	Green Bones
12	Isang Himala
10	My Future You
8	Strange Frequencies: Taiwan Killer Hospital
7	And the Breadwinner Is...
6	Uninvited

== Box office ==
The combined box office gross for the festival's films had surpassed ₱800 million, which was ₱200 million less than the previous edition. ABS-CBN Films' And the Breadwinner Is..., GMA Pictures' Green Bones and APT's The Kingdom are the top three earning films. Star Cinema announced that the film And the Breadwinner Is... earned ₱400 million of ticket sales, which was half the total gross of all MMFF entries.

== 2025 Manila International Film Festival ==
2025 Manila International Film Festival
- Date: March 4–7, 2025
- Site: TCL Chinese Theater, Hollywood, Los Angeles, California, United States; The Beverly Hilton, Beverly Hills, California, United States

The second edition of the Manila International Film Festival (MIFF) was supposed to take place in the United States from January 30 to February 2, 2024 and were to feature the entry films of the 2024 MMFF and additional films. The MIFF was to take place at the TCL Chinese Theater in Hollywood, Los Angeles. Due to the January 2025 Southern California wildfires the event was postponed. On January 29, 2025, it was announced that the event was officially rescheduled for March 4–7.

=== MIFF special entries ===
Title	Starring	Director	Notes
And the Breadwinner Is...	Vice Ganda, Eugene Domingo, Gladys Reyes, Jhong Hilario, Maris Racal, Anthony Jennings	Jun Robles Lana	Produced by ABS-CBN Studios, The IdeaFirst Company; 2024 family comedy-drama film
A Filipino in America	Doroteo B. Ines	Doroteo B. Ines	1938 thesis film
Espantaho	Judy Ann Santos and Lorna Tolentino	Chito S. Roño	Produced by Quantum Films, Cineko Productions, Purple Bunny Productions; 2024 horror film
Faith Healers	Zorayda Lee-Llacer, Randy Lizardo, Jose Manuel Romualdez	Regina Aquino	
Genghis Khan	Manuel Conde	Manuel Conde	1950 Historical drama film
Hello, Love, Again	Kathryn Bernardo and Alden Richards	Cathy Garcia-Sampana	Produced by ABS-CBN Studios, GMA Pictures; 2024 Romantic drama film
Love Hurts	Ke Huy Quan, Ariana DeBose and Daniel Wu	Jonathan Eusebio	Produced by 87North Productions; Action comedy film. Advanced screening
My Future You	Francine Diaz, Seth Fedelin	Crisanto Aquino	Produced by Regal Entertainment; 2024 Romantic comedy film
Nurse Unseen	Aveline Abiog, Meriden Angeles and Steve Angeles	Michele Josue	Documentary film
Song of the Fireflies	Morissette and Rachel Alejandro	King Palisoc	Produced by Culturtain Musicat Productions; Drama, Musical film
Strange Frequencies: Taiwan Killer Hospital	Enrique Gil, Jane De Leon, Alexa Miro	Kerwin Go	Produced by Reality MM Studios; 2024 horror film
The Debut	Dante Basco, Tirso Cruz III and Eddie Garcia	Gene Cajayon	Produced by 5 Card Productions; 2000 drama film
The Kingdom	Vic Sotto and Piolo Pascual	Michael Tuviera	Produced by APT Entertainment, Mzet Productions, MQuest Ventures; 2024 Action, family, drama film
Topakk	Arjo Atayde, Julia Montes, Sid Lucero, Enchong Dee, Kokoy de Santos	Richard Somes	Produced by Nathan Studios, Strawdog Studios, FUSEE; 2024 action thriller film

=== Awards ===
The Award Gala was held at the Beverly Hilton in Los Angeles on March 7, 2025.

- Best Picture – Song of the Fireflies
- Best Director – Cristanto Aquino (My Future You)
- Best Actor – Seth Fedelin (My Future You)
- Best Actress – Morissette (Song of the Fireflies)
- Best Supporting Actor – Noel Comia Jr. (Song of the Fireflies)
- Best Supporting Actress – Rachel Alejandro (Song of the Fireflies)
- Box Office Hit Award – Hello, Love, Again
- Visionary Award – Liza Araneta Marcos
- Trailblazer Awards – Tia Carrere, Nico Santos, Oliver T'sien, and The Debut
- Lifetime Achievement Awards – Boots Anson-Roa, Ricky Lee, Lily Monteverde, and Vilma Santos
- Special Awards – Song of the Fireflies and Faith Healers

Preceded by 2023 Metro Manila Film Festival	Metro Manila Film Festival; 2024	Succeeded by 2025 Metro Manila Film Festival
