= Green Bones =

2024 prison drama film by Zig Dulay

- Theatrical release poster
- Directed by: Zig Dulay
- Written by: Ricky Lee; Angeli Atienza
- Story by: JC Rubio
- Produced by: Nessa Valdellon; Angeli Atienza; Kristian Julao
- Starring: Dennis Trillo; Ruru Madrid
- Cinematography: Neil Daza
- Edited by: Benjamin Tolentino
- Music by: Len Calvo
- Production companies: GMA Pictures; GMA Public Affairs; Brightburn Entertainment
- Distributed by: Sony Pictures Releasing
- Release date: December 25, 2024 (MMFF)
- Running time: 100 minutes
- Country: Philippines
- Language: Filipino
- Box office: ₱133,742,461.06

Green Bones is a 2024 Philippine prison drama film directed by Zig Dulay and written by Ricky Lee and Anj Atienza from a story concept by JC Rubio. Starring Dennis Trillo and Ruru Madrid, the story follows Xavier Gonzaga, a police officer who is grieving his sister's death, while fighting against the release of the criminal named Domingo Zamora.

Produced by GMA Pictures, GMA Public Affairs, and Brightburn Entertainment, with Sony Pictures Releasing as distributor, the film was released theatrically on December 25, 2024, as one of the official entries to the 50th Metro Manila Film Festival.

== Synopsis ==
Domingo, a notorious criminal is set to be released from prison. Xavier, a newly assigned prison guard, being blinded by his own prejudice and beliefs, is determined to keep Domingo incarcerated despite a lack of legal grounds. Domingo's reserved demeanor feeds on Xavier growing suspicions, forcing him to uncover the prisoner's background story which leads him to discover the broken criminal justice system, personal vendetta and redemption.

== Cast ==
Lead cast

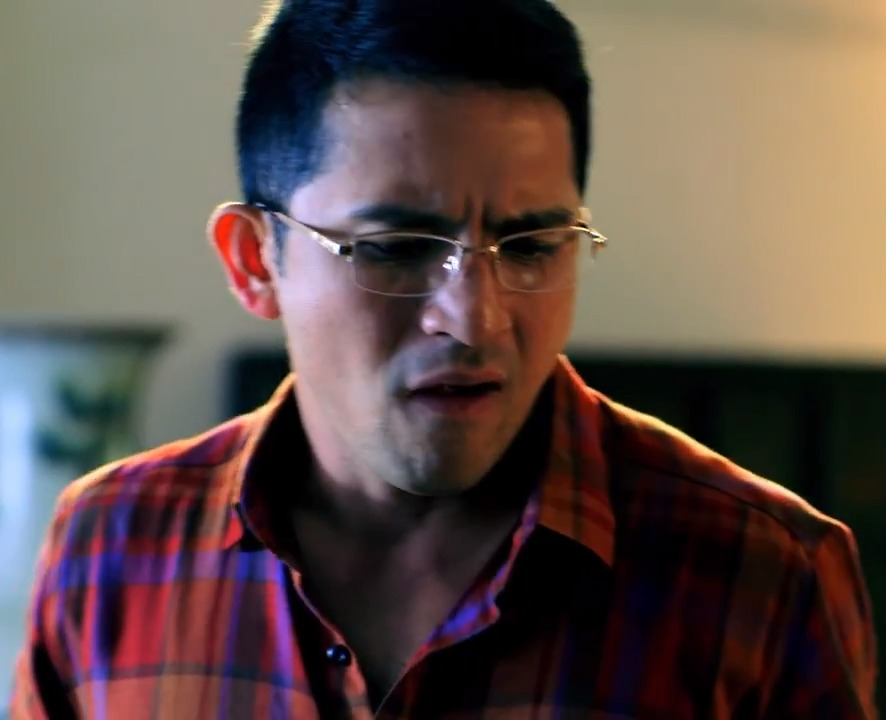
Dennis Trillo as Domingo Zamora

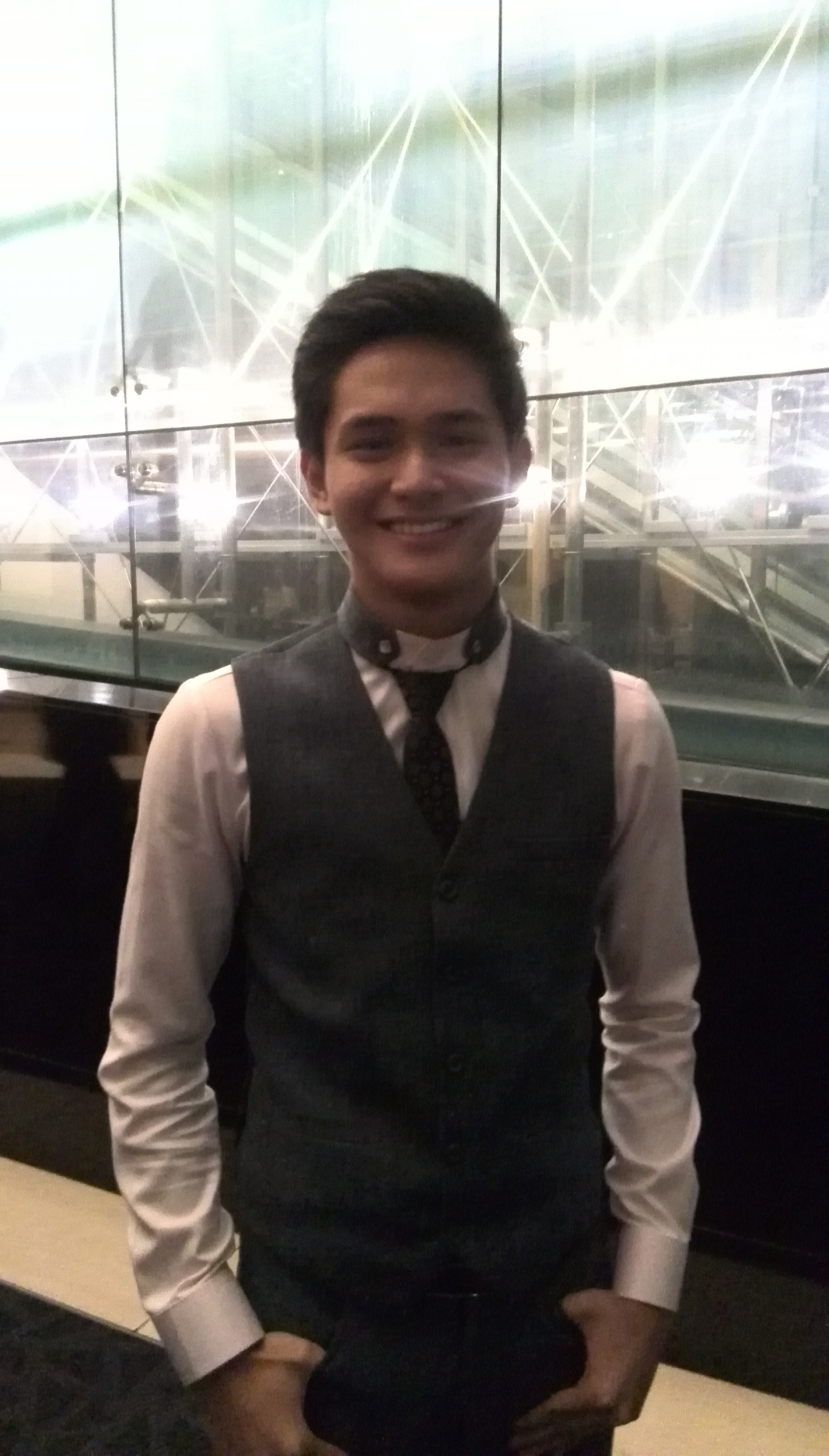
Ruru Madrid as Xavier Gonzaga

- Dennis Trillo as Domingo "Dom" Zamora, a criminal accused of murdering his own sister and niece.
- Ruru Madrid as Xavier Gonzaga, a prison guard.
  - Enzo Osorio as young Xavier
- Alessandra De Rossi as Betty
- Michael de Mesa as Juanito Velasquez
- Ronnie Lazaro as Edgardo Sevilla
- Sofia Pablo as Ruth Pineda
  - Sienna Stevens as young Ruth
- Wendell Ramos as Jonathan Cruz
- Pauline Mendoza as Elise Gonzaga, Xavier's sister
- Victor Neri as Carlos Pineda
- Kylie Padilla as Lisa
- Mikoy Morales as Minyong
- Royce Cabrera as Luis
- Ruby Ruiz as Mi
- Gerard Acao as Pol
- Raul Morit as Ador
- Iza Calzado as Joanna "Jo" Zamora-Pineda, Ruth's mother and Dom's sister
- Nonie Buencamino as Jorge Delos Santos

== Production ==
On July 15, 2024, GMA Pictures released an official teaser poster for the movie, which is an entry to the 2024 Metro Manila Film Festival. The film is entitled, Green Bones directed by Zig Dulay, who previously directed the film Firefly that won the Best Picture award in the previous year. Green Bones is one of the first five movie entries for the film festival.

Filming concluded on November 20, 2024.

== Music ==
The 2022 song "Nyebe" by Filipino boy band SB19 was used as the theme for Green Bones.

== Release ==
Green Bones was released in cinemas on December 25, 2024, at the 50th Metro Manila Film Festival. This is the first film to be released under GMA Pictures' distribution deal with American film company Columbia Pictures (through the Sony Pictures Releasing International label). The film was cited by the MMFF as one of the three top-grossing entries for its 2024 edition.

The film was screened at the Manila International Film Festival (MIFF) in Los Angeles on March 6, 2025.

In August 2025, Film Development Council of the Philippines announced Green Bones as one of the preselected contenders for the Best International Feature Film category to the Academy Awards in 2026. It lost to Director Lav Diaz's movie Magellan which was chosen as the official entry to the Oscar awards in September 2025.

== Reception ==
=== Accolades ===
Accolades received by Green Bones
Year	Award	Category	Recipient(s)	Result	Ref.
2024	50th Metro Manila Film Festival	Best Picture	Green Bones	Won	
2024	50th Metro Manila Film Festival	Fernando Poe Jr. Memorial Award for Excellence	Green Bones	Nominated	
2024	50th Metro Manila Film Festival	Best Director	Zig Dulay	Nominated	
2024	50th Metro Manila Film Festival	Best Actor	Dennis Trillo	Won	
2024	50th Metro Manila Film Festival	Best Supporting Actor	Ruru Madrid	Won	
2024	50th Metro Manila Film Festival	Best Screenplay	Ricky Lee and Angeli Atienza	Won	
2024	50th Metro Manila Film Festival	Best Cinematography	Neil Daza	Won	
2024	50th Metro Manila Film Festival	Best Production Design	Maolen Fadul	Nominated	
2024	50th Metro Manila Film Festival	Best Editing	Benjamin Tolentino	Nominated	
2024	50th Metro Manila Film Festival	Best Sound	Albert Michael Idioma and Nicole Rosacay	Nominated	
2024	50th Metro Manila Film Festival	Best Musical Score	Len Calvo	Nominated	
2024	50th Metro Manila Film Festival	Best Child Performer	Sienna Stevens	Won	
2025	Asian Academy Creative Awards	Best Screenplay	Ricky Lee	Won	
2025	Asian Academy Creative Awards	Best Actor in a Leading Role (Asia category)	Dennis Trillo	Won	
2025	Asian Academy Creative Awards	Best Actor in a Leading Role (National category)	Dennis Trillo	Won	
2025	International Golden Summit Excellence Award in Vietnam	Best Actor	Dennis Trillo	Won	
2025	Gawad Urian	Pinakamahusay na Pangunahing Aktor ( Best Actor )	Dennis Trillo	Won	
2025	FAMAS Awards	Best Picture	Green Bones	Nominated	
2025	FAMAS Awards	Best Director	Zig Dulay	Nominated	
2025	FAMAS Awards	Best Actor	Dennis Trillo	Nominated	
2025	FAMAS Awards	Best Supporting Actor	Ruru Madrid	Nominated	
2025	FAMAS Awards	Best Supporting Actress	Alessandra de Rossi	Nominated	
2025	FAMAS Awards	Best Visual Effects	Green Bones	Nominated	
2025	FAMAS Awards	Best Editing	Green Bones	Nominated	
2025	FAMAS Awards	Best Sound	Green Bones	Nominated	
2025	FAMAS Awards	Best Musical Score	Green Bones	Nominated	
2025	PMPC Star Awards for Movies	Movie of the Year	Green Bones	Nominated	.
2025	PMPC Star Awards for Movies	Movie Ensemble Acting of the Year	Green Bones	Nominated	.
2025	PMPC Star Awards for Movies	Movie Director of the Year	Zig Dulay	Nominated	.
2025	PMPC Star Awards for Movies	Movie Actor of the Year	Dennis Trillo	Won	.
2025	PMPC Star Awards for Movies	Movie Supporting Actor of the Year	Wendell Ramos	Nominated	.
2025	PMPC Star Awards for Movies	New Movie Actress of the Year	Sofia Pablo	Nominated	.
2025	PMPC Star Awards for Movies	Movie Child Performer of the Year	Sienna Stevens	Nominated	.
2025	PMPC Star Awards for Movies	Movie Original Screenplay of the Year	Ricky Lee and Anj Atienza	Won	.
2025	PMPC Star Awards for Movies	Movie Editor of the Year	Benjamin Tolentino	Won	.
2025	PMPC Star Awards for Movies	Movie Cinematographer of the Year	Niel Daza	Nominated	.
2025	PMPC Star Awards for Movies	Movie Production Designer of the Year	Marxie Maolen	Nominated	.
2025	PMPC Star Awards for Movies	Movie Musical Scorer of the Year	Len Calvo	Nominated	.
2025	PMPC Star Awards for Movies	Movie Sound Engineer of the Year	Albert Michael Idioma and Nicole Rosacay	Nominated	.
