= The Kingdom (2024 Philippine film) =

Film by Michael Tuviera

- Theatrical release poster
- Directed by: Michael Tuviera
- Screenplay by: Michelle Ngu-Nario
- Story by: Michelle Ngu-Nario; Michael Tuviera
- Produced by: Camille G. Montaño; Ruth P. Racela
- Starring: Vic Sotto; Piolo Pascual
- Cinematography: Shayne Sarte
- Edited by: Tara Illenberger
- Music by: Jessie Q. Lasaten
- Production companies: MQuest Ventures; APT Entertainment; MZet Television Productions
- Distributed by: MQuest Distribution
- Release date: December 25, 2024
- Running time: 133 minutes
- Country: Philippines
- Language: Filipino

The Kingdom is a 2024 Philippine action adventure alternate history film directed by Michael Tuviera from a story he co-wrote with Michelle Ngu-Nario, who solely adapted it into a screenplay. The film includes an ensemble cast featuring Vic Sotto, Piolo Pascual, Cristine Reyes, Sue Ramirez, and Sid Lucero. The film is set in an alternate timeline where the Philippines was never colonized by Western powers and is a monarchy called Kalayaan.

Produced by APT Entertainment, MQuest Ventures, and MZet Television Productions, it was part of the first batch of the 50th Metro Manila Film Festival (MMFF). The Kingdom won the Best Production Design and the Best Visual Effects award in the 50th MMFF.

== Plot ==
Makisig is the widowed king of Kalayaan, an uncolonized version of the Philippines in 2024. (Note: Set in the "present day" as per director Tuviera. The islands were never colonized by the Spanish Empire, never a territory of the United States, or occupied by Japan in World War II.) As he prepares to abdicate, Makisig is unsure which among his children to make heir apparent: Bagwis, his short-tempered and politically inept son, or his eldest daughter Matimyas, whom he had groomed to be his successor before she eloped with the son of a political rival.

A third child, Lualhati, is married off to a prince of Thailand in a diplomatic manoeuvre. On her way to the wedding, she is abducted by gunmen who shoot her sister, Matimyas. At a stopover, Sulo, a social outcast banished for a crime committed by his late father, notices Lualhati inside her kidnappers' truck, and he rescues her. Both hide in the hut of Sulo's former girlfriend, Rosa. The next day, the kidnappers attack the hut but are fended off by Rosa and Sulo. As Sulo and Lualhati flee, Rosa and her son Kiko are killed by a gunman who reports back to Matimyas, revealing her as the mastermind of Lualhati's kidnapping.

Wigan, the leader of the secessionist group Tiwalag, says he is holding Lualhati captive and demands independence for the north of the kingdom in exchange for her release. Silay, the nation’s chief babaylan, warns Makisig of betrayal by his children. Makisig initially suspects his son Bagwis, but allows him to negotiate with Wigan in the latter's base. Bagwis makes concessions to Wigan in exchange for a bracelet from Lualhati, prompting a surprise appearance by Makisig. However, both Makisig and Bagwis realize the bracelet is fake, leading to a battle between national and Tiwalag forces, with Wigan fatally stabbing Bagwis. Enraged, Makisig kills Wigan and orders the army to massacre Wigan's rebels.

At a checkpoint, Lualhati sees a royal servant, Tarek, who sneaks her and Sulo into the royal palace. Lualhati reunites with her father Makisig and is informed of Bagwis's death, but Matimyas falsely accuses Sulo of shooting her during Lualhati's abduction. Makisig orders Sulo arrested, but Sulo reveals himself to be the son of Sigwa, a Royal Guard executed by Makisig himself whilst he was a prince. Invoking customary law to avenge his father, Sulo challenges Makisig to a duel, which the king cannot refuse. Makisig visits Sulo in jail and reveals Sigwa was his friend, whom he was forced to execute under customary law after he had injured Makisig's brother while protecting him. Makisig reveals that Sigwa had absolved him as he died and expresses remorse. Before leaving, Makisig thanks Sulo for saving Lualhati, and asks him to protect her should he die. That night, Matimyas' son, Felipe, hands Makisig a drawing of the person who shot her. Realizing the truth, Makisig confronts Matimyas, but the latter vents her resentment at how he shuns her for her elopement.

At the scheduled duel, Sulo fatally stabs Makisig. Sulo is released as Makisig's royal funeral is held, and Matimyas succeeds as Queen. However, Lualhati stumbles upon Matimyas and Silay discussing how they conspired with Wigan to kidnap Lualhati, and inadvertently eliminated Bagwis in the process. Lualhati confronts the two, but Matimyas reveals her desire to seize the throne and blames Lualhati and Sulo for thwarting her intention to have Makisig crown her. Matimyas also chastises Lualhati for her marriage, saying that it would have put Kalayaan under foreign control, and reveals her jealousy towards her sister Lualhati for being their father Makisig's favorite. After a scuffle, Lualhati is overpowered by Matimyas and Silay, but as Matimyas is about to kill her, Felipe overhears the commotion and shields his aunt Lualhati. Matimyas and Silay are then arrested by Royal Guards, and Lualhati succeeds as the new queen. Sulo asks for her hand, saying her love had made him overcome his desire to take vengeance on Makisig. The film ends with Lualhati's enthronement, with Sulo as her consort.

In a mid-credits scene, Tarek visits the deposed Matimyas, who sits down and smiles menacingly in her prison cell.

== Cast ==
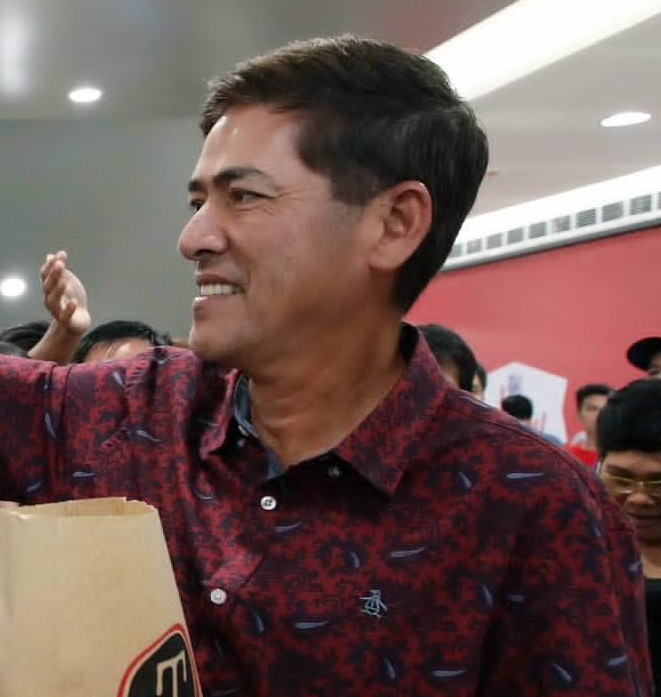
Vic Sotto

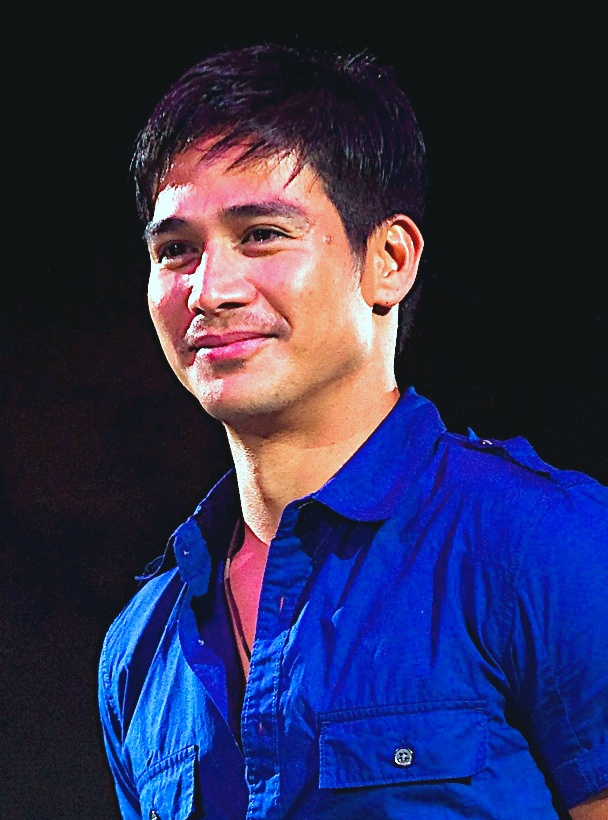
Piolo Pascual

- Vic Sotto as Lakan Makisig Nandula, the ruler of the Kingdom of Kalayaan, an alternative timeline monarchy in the Philippines. A descendant of Lakandula, he is the second son of Lakan Diwa and the father to Magat Bagwis, Dayang Matimyas, and Dayang Lualhati. He used to be a benevolent king who changed after his spouse Lakambini Hiraya died in childbirth.
  - Cedrick Juan as a young Magat Makisig. Juan is billed to have "special participation" in the film.
- Piolo Pascual as Sulayman "Sulo" Tagum, a tinatwa (outcast) and a farmer, who is also a son of a disgraced Kalasag Royal Guard. Unlike the free people or the Malayas, he has no tattoos. Due to his social stature, he was denied decent education and livelihood. He condemns this injustice and questions the Kingdom of Kalayaan. Despite everything, he remains a good man who can't turn a blind eye to wrongdoing. Through his journey with Dayang Lualhati, he learns to let go of his hatred.
- Cristine Reyes as Dayang Matimyas Nandula, the middle child and responsible daughter of Makisig.
- Sue Ramirez as Dayang Lualhati Nandula
- Sid Lucero as Magat Bagwis Nandula
- Nico Antonio as Tarek, an aide of the royal family.
- Zion Cruz as Prinsipe Felipe, Makisig's grandson and Matimyas' son.
- Ruby Ruiz as Silayan Hil-um, a head babaylan.
- Art Acuña as Carpio, the head of the Kalasag Royal Guards.
- Soliman Cruz as Lolo Kip, Grandfather of Sulo and father of Sigwa.
- Iza Calzado as Rosa, an acquaintance of Sulo and a former member of the Tiwalag.
- Manny Pangilinan appears in a cameo
- Archi Adamos as Wigan.

=== Special participation ===
- Eula Valdes as Lakambini Hiraya, the queen of the Kingdom of Kalayaan and the late wife of Makisig Nandula.
- Arnold Reyes as Sigwa Tagum, the late father of Sulo and former member of the Kalasag Royal Guards.

== Production ==
Flag of the Kingdom of Kalayaan, the main setting of the film.

The Kingdom is a co-production between APT Entertainment, MQuest Ventures, and MZet Television Productions. Michael "Mike" Tuviera of APT serves as the film's director, while Michael Ngu-nario is the writer. Tuviera first pitched the story to Jane Basas of MQuest during a story conference for Padyak Princess. He described it a "non-political film about politics" which centers around family. The film was originally conceived as a television series for the TV5 network. However, Tuviera decided to produce it as a film for the 50th Metro Manila Film Festival. It was among the first five entries of the 50th MMFF announced on July 16, 2024; all of which were submitted as scripts. Pre-production in February 2024, while filming began in July and took four months. Typhoons during the filming period flooded the filming sets several times and affected the filming schedule.

The Kingdom is noted for not heavily featuring comedy, despite the casting of Vic Sotto, an actor who has starred in mostly comedic projects. Sotto told Tuviera that his children wanted him to act in a serious film akin to The Godfather. For Sotto's role, temporary whole-body tattoos had to be applied for three hours, which serves as a status symbol for his character. Sotto also had to undergo Filipino martial arts training in preparation for the role. Sotto remarked he had to change his voice for the role, departing from the usual tone he uses while hosting Eat Bulaga!. To accurately depict his role as a monarch, Sotto avoided interacting with co-actors as he found it difficult to do dramatic scenes with actors he befriended.

Tuviera approached business tycoon and co-producer Manny V. Pangilinan for a speaking cameo in the marriage of a Thai prince and Dayang Lualhati. Thinking it was a joke, Pangilinan was reluctant, having only appeared in one film, the 2010 biographical film Rosario, about his grandmother. After being convinced to appear, he expressed to Tuviera and Sotto his nervousness. To calm him down, Tuviera asked if he met a king, and Pangilinan discussed his experience meeting with the late King of Thailand Bhumibol Adulyadej, which helped inform the production of the sequence.

Tuviera mentioned the opening sequence, involving a Kalayaan warship, to be the most difficult to execute, requiring four to five months of planning. It was shot in June, on the last day of filming. The production team reached out to the Philippine Navy, who loaned them the BRP Jose Rizal for use in the film.

== Release ==
As one of the ten official entries of the 50th Metro Manila Film Festival, The Kingdom was released in Philippine cinemas on Christmas Day, December 25, 2024.

The film was also scheduled to premiere at the Manila International Film Festival (MIFF) in Los Angeles on January 30, 2025, but was postponed to March 4 to 7 due to the 2025 California wildfires.

== Reception ==
=== Box office ===
The film was cited by the MMFF as one of the three top-grossing entries for its 2024 edition.

=== Critical reception ===
The Kingdom received positive reception for its visual effects and effective acting. The Philippine Entertainment Portal's Ingrid Puache mentioned a drone shot of the Guadalupe Bridge with edited billboards that praise the monarchy of Kalayaan as an example of the film's "blending [of] familiar landscapes and the imagined kingdom". Rappler's Mia Magdalena Fokno found Cedrick Juan and Iza Calzado's short appearances impactful and inferred that the production team consulted historians and anthropologists for the film's props to use cultural material respectfully. Reviewers also contrasted Vic Sotto's role in The Kingdom to his other comedic performances in a positive review.

Several reviewers commented that the film could have been longer or presented as a series to explore dynamics among characters and their motives. Although "the story's many weaves does a lot for the movie that runs just over two hours", a longer screentime would have allowed the film to explore the dynamics of Makisig's family and interaction between Sulo and Lualhati, Kristofer Purnell of The Philippine Star explained. Reviewers who align with Purnell' comment include explanations for Matimyas's conspiracy and motives and the royal family's perception on Bagwis. Adrian A. Eva from BusinessWorld says that the multiple plot lines of the film compromised character development.

The Philippine Daily Inquirer's Hannah Mallorca recognized that in spite of limitations in its length and challenges in executing the film's premise, The Kingdom provided "potential to expand into a variety of stories" with balance.

=== Accolades ===
Accolades received by Green Bones
Year	Award	Category	Recipient(s)	Result	Ref.
2024	50th Metro Manila Film Festival	Best Picture (2nd)	The Kingdom	Won	
2024	50th Metro Manila Film Festival	Fernando Poe Jr. Memorial Award for Excellence	The Kingdom	Nominated	
2024	50th Metro Manila Film Festival	Gatpuno Antonio J. Villegas Cultural Award	The Kingdom	Won	
2024	50th Metro Manila Film Festival	Best Director	Michael Tuviera	Won	
2024	50th Metro Manila Film Festival	Best Actor	Vic Sotto	Nominated	
2024	50th Metro Manila Film Festival	Best Actor	Piolo Pascual	Nominated	
2024	50th Metro Manila Film Festival	Best Supporting Actor	Sid Lucero	Nominated	
2024	50th Metro Manila Film Festival	Best Supporting Actress	Cristine Reyes	Nominated	
2024	50th Metro Manila Film Festival	Best Screenplay	Michelle Ngu-Nario	Nominated	
2024	50th Metro Manila Film Festival	Best Cinematography	Shayne Sarte	Nominated	
2024	50th Metro Manila Film Festival	Best Production Design	Nestor Abrogena	Won	
2024	50th Metro Manila Film Festival	Best Editing	Tara Illenberger	Nominated	
2024	50th Metro Manila Film Festival	Best Original Theme Song	"Magkabilaan"	Nominated	
2024	50th Metro Manila Film Festival	Best Musical Score	Jessie Lasaten	Nominated	
2024	50th Metro Manila Film Festival	Best Visual Effects	Riot Inc.	Won	
2024	50th Metro Manila Film Festival	Best Child Performer	Zion Cruz	Nominated	
2025	5th Pinoy Rebyu Awards	Best Production Design	Nestor Abrogena Jr.	Pending	
2025	2025 Asian Academy Creative Awards	Best Actor in a Supporting Role	Piolo Pascual	Won	

== Cancelled television series ==
A television series sequel titled The Kingdom: Magkabilang Mundo has been announced and was supposed to be released in Netflix and later aired on TV5 in sometime in 2026. The series reportedly was a intended as a continuation of the film's story dealing with how Queen Sariyah's reign is "shaken by ancient bloodlines and power-hungry rivals".

Mike Tuviera was to be the director of Magkabilang Mundo. Additional cast members include Ryza Cenon and Derek Ramsay. Ramsay was to play the role of Rajah Siyam which he describes as similar to his role in Ang Panday.

However it was later cancelled due to budget issues.

== Sources ==
- Vic Sotto, Piolo Pascual, nagkita na para sa kanilang pelikulang 'The Kingdom' [Vic Sotto, Piolo Pascual, already met for their film 'The Kingdom']. Frontline Pilipinas (in Filipino). News5Everywhere. August 1, 2024 – via YouTube.
