= Isang Himala =

2024 Philippine musical drama film by Pepe Diokno

- Theatrical release poster
- Directed by: Pepe Diokno
- Written by: Pepe Diokno; Ricky Lee
- Based on: Himala, Isang Musikal by Ricky Lee; Vincent de Jesus Himala by Ricky Lee
- Produced by: Madonna Tarrayo; Pepe Diokno
- Starring: Aicelle Santos
- Cinematography: Carlo Mendoza
- Edited by: Benjamin Tolentino
- Music by: Vincent De Jesus
- Production companies: Kapitol Films; UXS
- Distributed by: Creazion Studios
- Release date: December 25, 2024
- Running time: 145 minutes
- Country: Philippines
- Language: Filipino

Isang Himala (lit. 'A miracle') is a 2024 Philippine musical drama film co-produced and directed by Pepe Diokno from a script he co-wrote with Ricky Lee. It is based on a 2018 theatrical play of the same name, itself an adaptation of the 1982 film Himala. With a large number of the cast originating from theatre, Aicelle Santos and Bituin Escalante reprised their roles from the musical, and the special appearance of Nora Aunor, who played Elsa in the aforementioned film.

Produced by Kapitol Films and UXS, with Creazion Studios handling the distribution, the film was theatrically released on December 25, 2024, as part of the 50th Metro Manila Film Festival. However, it was underperformed at the box office, failing to enter the Top 3 in the top-performing MMFF entries in box-office sales.

== Premise ==
Based on Nora Aunor's Himala, the film traces back the story of Elsa, a visionary turned faith healer of her town.

== Cast ==
- Aicelle Santos as Elsa, a young woman in Cupang who allegedly saw an apparition of the Virgin Mary. Santos portrayed Elsa in the 2018 theatrical play directed by Ed Lacson Jr. and reprises the role in the 2024 musical film.
- Bituin Escalante as Aling Saling, Elsa's mother Escalante played the character in the 2018 play and reprises the role.
- Floyd Tena as a Priest.
- David Ezra as Orly, a skeptical journalist from Manila
- Neomi Gonzales as Chayong, a close friend of Elsa.
- Kakki Teodoro as Nimia, a close friend of Elsa.
- Vic Robinson as Pilo, Chayong's boyfriend.
- Joann Co as Sepa, a believer of the apparition

Nora Aunor, who starred in the 1982 film as Elsa, made a cameo appearance in a movie. A significant portion of the film's cast comes from a theatre background.

== Production ==
Isang Himala is a co-production of Kapitol Films and Uxs, Inc. Pepe Diokno will direct the feature film with the screenplay written also by him alongside Ricky Lee.

Isang Himala is based on the theatrical play, Himala: Isang Musikal, which premiered in 2018. The play itself was based on the 1982 film Himala which starred Nora Aunor and directed by Ishmael Bernal

The feature film was announced in July 2024 as one of the first five entries of the 2024 Metro Manila Film Festival as a script submission.

== Release ==
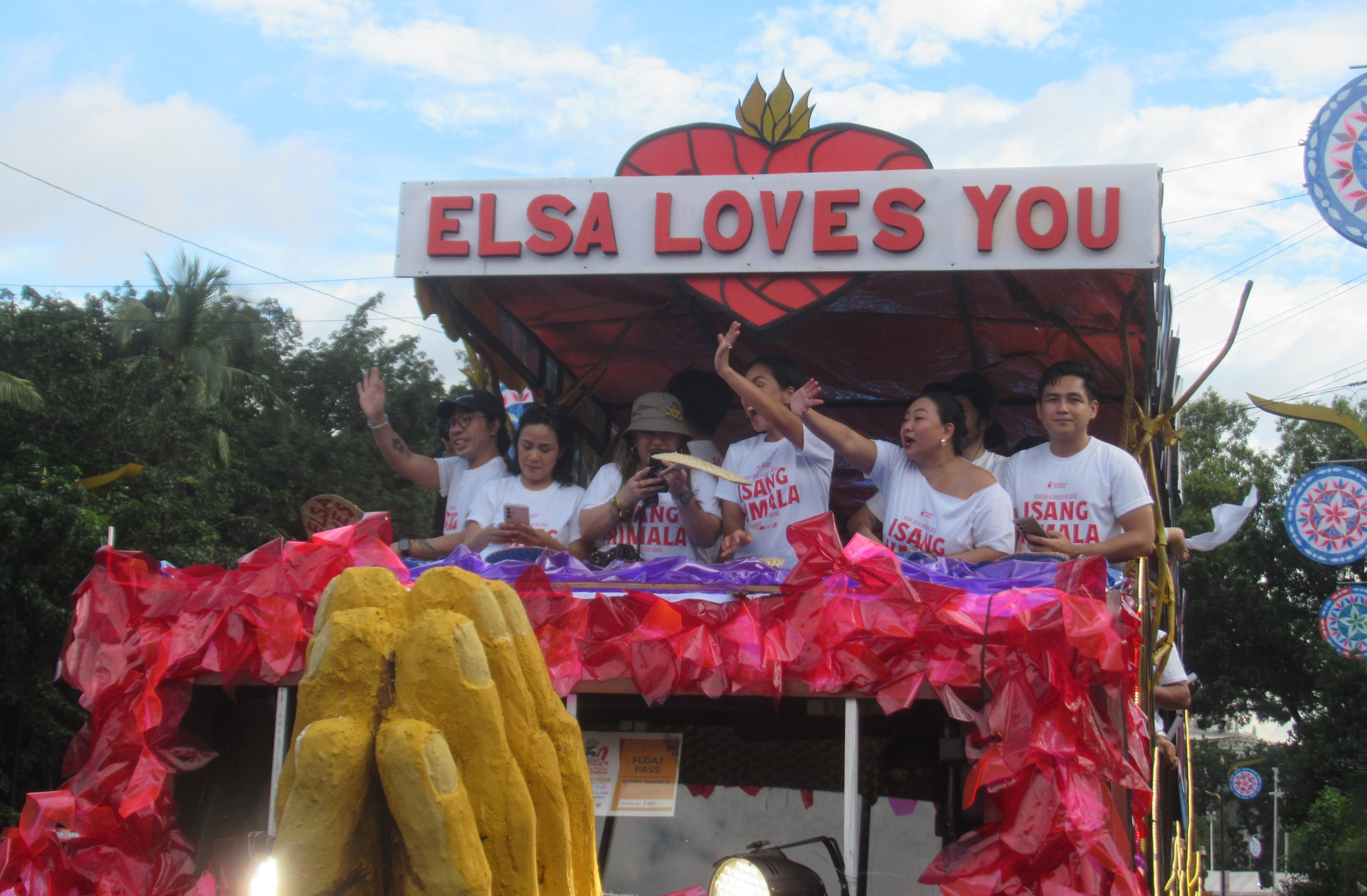
The float for Isang Himala at the Parade of Stars for the 50th Metro Manila Film Festival

As one of the ten official entries of the 50th Metro Manila Film Festival, Isang Himala had its theatrical release in cinemas in the Philippines on Christmas Day 2024, with four cinemas on the first day and then six cinemas on the second day. The film also premiered at the Manila International Film Festival (MIFF) in Los Angeles on January 30, 2025.

== Reception ==
=== Box office ===
It is one of the lowest-selling MMFF 2024 entries along with My Future You and Hold Me Close. The film was a box office bomb due to failed to hit box office hit sales and one of the underrated film of 2024. As of January 2, 2025, the film failed to enter the Top 5 and Top 3 in the top-performing MMFF entries in box-office sales.

=== Accolades ===
Accolades received by Green Bones
| Year | Award | Category | Recipient(s) | Result | Ref. |
|---|---|---|---|---|---|
| 2024 | 50th Metro Manila Film Festival | Best Picture | Isang Himala | 4th | |
| 2024 | 50th Metro Manila Film Festival | Special Jury Prize | Isang Himala | Won | |
| 2024 | 50th Metro Manila Film Festival | Best Director | Pepe Diokno | Nominated | |
| 2024 | 50th Metro Manila Film Festival | Best Actress | Aicelle Santos | Nominated | |
| 2024 | 50th Metro Manila Film Festival | Best Supporting Actor | David Ezra | Nominated | |
| 2024 | 50th Metro Manila Film Festival | Best Supporting Actress | Kakki Teodoro | Won | |
| 2024 | 50th Metro Manila Film Festival | Best Screenplay | Ricky Lee and Pepe Diokno | Nominated | |
| 2024 | 50th Metro Manila Film Festival | Best Production Design | Ericsson Navarro | Nominated | |
| 2024 | 50th Metro Manila Film Festival | Best Sound | Albert Michael Idioma and Emilio Bien Sparks | Nominated | |
| 2024 | 50th Metro Manila Film Festival | Best Original Theme Song | "Ang Himala Ay Nasa Puso" (by Juan Karlos) | Won | |
| 2024 | 50th Metro Manila Film Festival | Best Musical Score | Vincent de Jesus | Won | |
| 2024 | 50th Metro Manila Film Festival | Best Visual Effects | Engine Room and Green Maya | Nominated | |
