= Mike Tuviera =

Filipino writer, producer, and director

Michael Tuviera
- Born: Michael P. Tuviera
- Education: University of Southern California
- Occupations: Writer; producer; director; talent manager
- Years active: 1997–present
- Known for: Director of The Kingdom

Michael P. Tuviera is a Filipino director, writer and producer. One of his notable works is the 2024 Metro Manila Film Festival entry, The Kingdom.

He is the son of former Eat Bulaga producer and APT Entertainment founder Tony Tuviera.

== Early life and education ==
Tuviera studied communication arts at the Ateneo de Manila University. In one of his film projects, one of his actors was future congressman Dato Macapagal Arroyo.

He is the first Filipino to be accepted in University of Southern California of Cinema Television and Production Program where he earned his Master's degree in 2004.

== Career ==
After studying in University of Southern California School of Cinemamatic Arts, he worked in 1997 as a writer for the sitcom, 1 for 3. He also directed Yaya and Angelina: The Spoiled Brat Movie that was billed by Michael V. and Ogie Alcasid.

In 2014, he directed an independent film titled The Janitor starring Dennis Trillo, Derek Ramsay and Richard Gomez. The said movie waas an entry for the Cinemalaya Festival.

He also directed Imagine You and Me in 2016, starred by Alden Richards and Maine Mendoza. He criticized pirated copy holders of the movie.

In 2024, he directed the entry The Kingdom, billed by Vic Sotto and Piolo Pascual, which was also submitted as an entry to 2024 MMFF. In the awards night, the movie won 2nd best picture, best production design, best visual design, Gatpuno Antonio J. Villegas Cultural Award, and Tuviera was selected as one of two best director awardees.

== Credits ==
=== Screenwriter ===
Year	Title
1997	1 for 3

=== Director ===
Year	Title
2024	The Kingdom
2019	Mission Unstapabol: The Don Identity
2018	Jack Em Popoy: The Puliscredibles
2015	Imagine You and Me
2015–16	Princess in the Palace
2014	The Janitor
2014	APT Lenten Special: Panalangin
2013	Kidlat
2012	Faithfully
2012	The Good Daughter
2011	Futbolilits
2011	Dwarfina
2010	Super Inday and the Golden Bibe
2010	Panday Kids
2009	Yaya and Angelina: The Spoiled Brat Movie
2008	Sine Novela: Until Forever
2008	Shake, Rattle and Roll X
2008	Luna Mystika
2008	Codename: Asero
2008	Sine Novela: Unsung Melody
2007	Lupin
2007	The Promise
2006	Captain Barbell
2006	Shake, Rattle and Roll 8
2006	TxT

=== Screenwriter & Director ===
Year	Title
2007	Shake, Rattle and Roll 9

=== Producer ===
Year	Title
	Standing
2017	Meant to Beh
2012	Bwakaw
	Fuschia

=== Executive Producer ===
Year	Title
	Byaheng Broken Hearted
	Amulet and Enteng Kabisote
	Cassava
	Grandpa Is Dead
	Scaregivers
	Dobol Trobol: Lets Get Redi 2 Rambol!
	Moments of Love

== Personal life ==
Tuviera is married to Penelope Daza. He has 3 children.
