= Strange Frequencies: Taiwan Killer Hospital =

2024 Filipino horror film

- Theatrical release poster
- Directed by: Kerwin Go
- Written by: Kerwin Go; Dustin Celestino; Leovic Arceta
- Based on: Gonjiam: Haunted Asylum by Jung Bum-shik
- Produced by: Dondon Monteverde; Erik Matti; Enrique Gil
- Starring: Enrique Gil; Jane de Leon; Alexa Miro; MJ Lastimosa; Raf Pineda; Ryan Azurin
- Cinematography: Mark Tirona
- Edited by: Kurt Claridades
- Music by: Mikey Amistoso; Jazz Nicolas
- Production companies: Reality MM Studios; Creative Leaders Group 8
- Release date: December 25, 2024
- Running time: 92 minutes
- Country: Philippines
- Language: Filipino

Strange Frequencies: Taiwan Killer Hospital is a 2024 Philippine found footage supernatural horror film based on the 2018 South Korean film Gonjiam: Haunted Asylum. The film stars Enrique Gil, Jane de Leon, Alexa Miro, MJ Lastimosa, Raf Pineda and Ryan "Zarckaroo" Azurin. Produced by Reality MM Studios and Creative Leaders Group 8, it serves as an official entry to the 2024 Metro Manila Film Festival.

The film was later released in Netflix on September 5, 2025, and it debuted at the number 1 spot on Netflix's top 10 movies in the Philippines.

== Plot ==
Two foreign vloggers record their exploration of the reportedly haunted Xinglin General Hospital, where a spirit attacks and kills them. The hospital, which had closed thirty years prior due to lawsuits alleging medical malpractice and wrongful deaths, grew infamous due to reported ghost sightings and rumors of cult activity.

The ensuing media frenzy catches the attention of Quen, a popular actor who creates the Strange Frequencies livestream program to rebrand himself as a serious producer. He forms a ghost-hunting group with his friends Jane, Alexa, Rob, MJ, Raf, and YouTuber Zarckaroo to explore Xinglin. He informs them that their pay scales with the livestream's viewership, exciting everyone except Jane. After arriving in Taiwan and meeting their tour guide, Lee Fung, they explore Taipei to promote the livestream. The next day, they meet with a Taiwanese medium who implores them to be careful and respectful of Xinglin.

The group arrives at Xinglin and sets up their equipment. Raf gives Jane a tarot card reading, where he pulls The Devil twice. While monitoring cameras, Rob watches Lee, Quen, and Zarck plant props. Quen and Lee operate base camp while the others are given camera rigs that record their faces and their POVs. Quen assigns MJ and Zarck to the surgery wing, Jane and Rob to the children's ward, and Raf and Alexa to the OR.

On the way to the surgery wing, Zarck begins violently coughing up blood, forcing him and MJ to return to base camp. Inside the OR, Raf and Alexa find evidence of cult rituals. Alexa finds a secret door that leads to a large chamber containing animal bones and ominous paintings. The two argue over Alexa's recklessness, causing Alexa to storm off. Alone, Raf finds The Devil tarot card and hears demonic laughter while searching for Alexa. Meanwhile, Rob and Jane identify a nurse suspected of killing 15 infants and attempt to communicate with her. After seeing a shadowy figure, Jane panics, but Rob reveals to her that the livestream is staged.

The team, except for Alexa, reunites with Quen. They debate leaving when Zarck suddenly vomits and appears covered with blisters before falling comatose. Lee tells the group that he cannot contact Wei, the security guard he bribed, and Quen says that if they contact anyone outside, they will get arrested. Jane insists on finding Alexa and leaving, but Quen points out that they are going too viral to stop. Alexa, lost and cut off from communicating with the others, is attacked by a spirit in the kitchen. Rob tells Quen to turn down the scares, but Quen insists that everything they've witnessed is real. Jane, who stayed behind, begs the livestream audience for help. Alexa finds the vloggers' camcorders, which capture the spirits killing them.

MJ argues with Raf over her belief that Alexa is faking it and separates. Raf finds a catatonic Alexa, who walks off and disappears. He searches the other rooms, but is attacked and killed by a spirit. Quen discovers a skinbound book containing photos of the owner sacrificing patients. MJ finds one of Raf's tarot cards and stumbles upon his dead body. Rob is attacked by spirits, which Jane hears over the radio. Rob, seemingly possessed, attacks Jane, but she manages to escape. Jane returns to base camp, where an injured Rob stumbles to her. Believing that he is still possessed, she strikes him with a hammer, killing him.

Quen finds Alexa hiding in a freezer and reveals his findings. They find Jane and watch as one of the spirits kills her. Quen and Alexa return to base, finding Zarck and Rob's corpses. They go to the parking garage and find MJ, who has a second, demonic face. Alexa is dragged by a spirit that goads Quen into committing suicide. A TikTok-style video reveals that Lee Fung lures explorers to the hospital to create content about their demises. The next morning, Alexa manages to escape the hospital.

== Cast ==
- Enrique Gil
- Jane de Leon
- Alexa Miro
- Rob Gomez
- MJ Lastimosa
- Raf Pineda
- Ryan "Zarckaroo" Azurin

== Production ==
The film was initially known under its working title, Strange Frequencies: Haunted Hospital. It was directed and written by Kerwin Go, produced by Reality MM Studios, Inc., and written by Dustin Celestino and Leovic Arceta. Immerse Entertainment is also involved in the production.

The film is an adaptation of the 2018 South Korean film. Gonjiam: Haunted Asylum. It is dubbed as the Philippines' first-ever meta found footage horror film. Local audiences and critics are anticipating for the film's release. Following the format of the original Korean movie, the group of Filipino amateur ghost-hunters will explore the notorious Xinglin General Hospital in Tainan, which is reputed to be one of the most haunted places in Taiwan.

On July 16, 2024, the film was selected among the first five entries for the 2024 Metro Manila Film Festival, all of which were submitted as scripts.

== Release ==
Strange Frequencies: Taiwan Killer Hospital premiered in cinemas in the Philippines on December 25, 2024, as one of the official entries of the 50th Metro Manila Film Festival.

The film is set to premier at the Manila International Film Festival (MIFF) in Los Angeles on January 30, 2025.

== Reception ==
=== Critical response ===
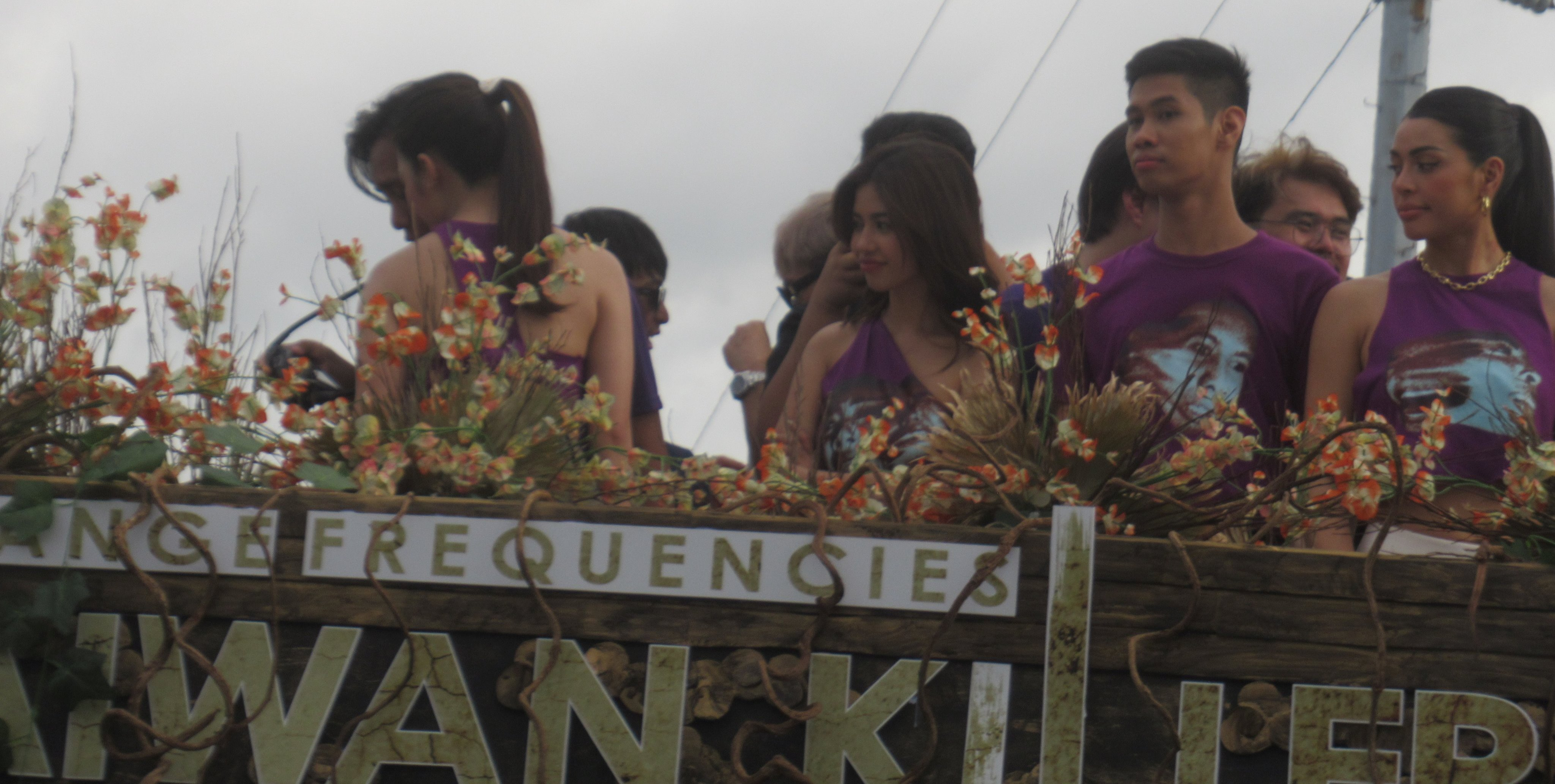

Writing for Entertainment Inquirer, Jessica Ann Evangelista described the film as "a decent blend of meta horror and humor," providing an effective "nerve-wracking atmosphere" that displayed an "enjoyable horror experience with a fair share of frights and laughs." Evangelista also praised the performances of Jane de Leon and Alexa Miro for their effectiveness and Raf Pineda's comic timing. Khryzztine Joy Baylon of Philippine Entertainment Portal opined that the "tension and terror are palpable, drawing viewers into the experience, and in this way, the film successfully blends meta-horror with vlogging." Baylon also commended the performances of Enrique Gil, Alexa Miro and Raf Pineda, with emphasis on Jane De Leon, stating that "she delivers her lines with the perfect intensity, shifting seamlessly from light moments to dramatic and suspenseful ones." Le Baltar of Rappler called it the darkhorse of the edition, describing it as an "unabashedly meta and spiked with so much adrenaline, particularly when things take a dreadful turn... it’s a horror flick that’s pretty confident on its own."

John Kobe Balod of The Varsitarian described the film as a "bold step, but not much else." Balod praised the films "use of action camera footage" which created "an immersive experience", "the minimal lighting and restrained camerawork, which heighten the tension and claustrophobia and deliver a unique sensory experience." Writing for The Philippine Star, Mikhail Lecaros gave the film a positive review, describing it as an "endlessly suspenseful (and traumatizing) exercise in fear." Lecaros commended the art direction and production of the film and praised the performances of Jane De Leon, Alexa Miro and Mary Jane Lastimosa. Philbert Dy of Spot.ph gave the film three out of five stars, criticizing the films weak plot but commended the performances of the ensemble cast.

== Accolades ==
Accolades received by Strange Frequencies: Taiwan Killer Hospital
Award	Date	Category	Recipient(s)	Result	Ref.
Metro Manila Film Festival	December 27, 2024	Best Actress	Jane de Leon	Nominated	
Metro Manila Film Festival	December 27, 2024	Best Cinematography	Mark Tirona	Nominated	
Metro Manila Film Festival	December 27, 2024	Best Production Design	Jerann Ordinario	Nominated	
Metro Manila Film Festival	December 27, 2024	Best Editing	Kurt Claridades	Nominated	
Metro Manila Film Festival	December 27, 2024	Best Sound	Ditoy Aguila	Won	
Metro Manila Film Festival	December 27, 2024	Best Musical Score	Mikey Amostoso and Jazz Nicolas	Nominated	
Metro Manila Film Festival	December 27, 2024	Best Visual Effects	Mothership Inc.	Nominated	
Metro Manila Film Festival	December 27, 2024	Breakthrough Performance Award	Alexa Miro	Nominated	
Society of Filipino Film Reviewers	March 8, 2025	Best Film Editing	Kurt Claridades	Pending	
Society of Filipino Film Reviewers	March 8, 2025	Best Production Design	Jerann Ordinario	Pending	
The EDDYS	July 20, 2025	Best Sound	Ditoy Aguila	Nominated	
The EDDYS	July 20, 2025	Best Visual Effects	Mothership Inc.	Nominated	
