= A Filipino in America =

1938 film by Doroteo Ines

- Directed by: Doroteo Ines
- Starring: Doroteo Ines
- Release date: 1938
- Running time: 34 minutes
- Country: United States
- Language: None (Silent film)

A Filipino in America is a thesis film directed in 1938 by Doroteo Ines. The film tackles a Filipino migrant man's experience in working and studying in the United States in the 1930s.

== Plot ==
A Filipino young man (Doroteo Ines) goes to the United States via the Pensionado Act of 1903 to pursue the American Dream. He struggles to attain employment in America, settling for agricultural jobs. Months later he enters the University of Southern California to pursue a degree in mining engineering and also he befriends white people. Outside the campus he experiences systemic racism. The man was able to graduate and obtain a degree but was only able to get a job as a dishwasher for mining company. The film ends with the man returning to the Philippines.

== Production ==
A Filipino in America was produced and directed by Doroteo Ines during his graduate tenure at the University of Southern California. It was part of his thesis project. It is a 34-minute silent film.

== Restoration and release ==
The Pamana Foundation (now the Filipino American Heritage Institute) restored the film. In 1992, the film was partially restored and it took another six years before it was ready for public screening.

The film will be part of the special screening of the 2025 Manila International Film Festival in Los Angeles which will run from January 30 to February 2, 2025.
