= And the Breadwinner Is... =

2024 film by Jun Robles Lana

- Theatrical release poster
- Directed by: Jun Robles Lana
- Screenplay by: Daisy G. Cayanan; Jumbo A. Albano; Jun Robles Lana
- Story by: Daisy G. Cayanan; Jumbo A. Albano
- Produced by: Marjorie B. Lachica
- Starring: Vice Ganda; Eugene Domingo; Jhong Hilario
- Cinematography: Carlo Mendoza
- Edited by: Benjamin Tolentino
- Music by: Teresa Barrozo
- Production companies: ABS-CBN Studios; The IdeaFirst Company
- Distributed by: Star Cinema
- Release date: December 25, 2024
- Running time: 123 minutes
- Country: Philippines
- Language: Filipino
- Box office: ₱460 million

And the Breadwinner Is... is a 2024 Philippine family comedy-drama film directed by Jun Robles Lana from a screenplay he co-wrote with Daisy G. Cayanan and Jonathan "Jumbo" Albano, who wrote the story concept. The film features an ensemble cast featuring Vice Ganda and Eugene Domingo. It follows the story of a breadwinner who returns to the country after working overseas.

A co-production of Star Cinema and The IdeaFirst Company, it marks the very first collaboration between the two production companies and Vice Ganda's second film without the involvement of Viva Films since The Super Parental Guardians and his first film after a two-year hiatus in cinema. It was released theatrically on December 25, 2024, as part of the 50th Metro Manila Film Festival.

== Plot ==
Bambi Salvador, an Overseas Filipino Worker (OFW) who has spent 15 years in Taiwan, returns to the Philippines to surprise her family and celebrate her 44th birthday. However, she arrives to find her family home in disrepair and her mother, referred to in the film as Momshie, unable to recall her due to Alzheimer's disease. When her younger brother, Biboy, admits to mismanaging the remittances she sent and falling into debt, a disheartened Bambi leaves and stays with her close friend, Jovie. After having a vision of her late father, referred to in the film as Popshie, she resolves to keep her promise to support the family after his death.

Bambi returns home only to discover that her family has mistakenly held a wake for her, and is trampled by frightened mourners who believe she is a ghost. Her siblings explain that she was declared dead after she was mistaken for a thief that stole her identification card who was then fatally struck afterwards by a bus and was unrecognizable after the accident. Learning of her life insurance policy from an agent, Tonton, they urge her to maintain the deception in order to claim the money. Although initially reluctant, Bambi changes her mind after learning that Biboy sold the house to a group of loan sharks led by Tope, who assault him.

Disguised, (Note: derived from Vice Ganda’s characters in previous films such as The Unkabogable Praybeyt Benjamin, The Amazing Praybeyt Benjamin, Girl, Boy, Bakla, Tomboy, Beauty and the Bestie and Gandarrapido: The Revenger Squad) Bambi attends her own wake but is interrupted by the return of her estranged sister, Baby. Baby supports the scheme and reveals that after her husband died, she too fell into debt while in Italy and had been unable to send money home. After staging her funeral, Bambi proposes reviving Popshie's bakery and enlists her siblings to help. She discovers her younger brother Boy is gay and supports him, while also teaching Biboy how to bake. Meanwhile, she slowly reconciles with Baby, who is the only one who knows their father's secret recipe. With the bakery reopened and thriving, the family begins to regain financial stability.

Buneng, the youngest of the siblings, develops a crush on Tonton, who suspects the Salvadors of insurance fraud. During a visit to their home, Buneng attempts to flirt with him but inadvertently reveals Bambi's friendship with Jovie. Suspicious, Tonton visits Jovie, who unintentionally confirms the fraud by revealing that Bambi stayed with her on the day she was declared dead. Tonton returns to the Salvadors' neighborhood and finds Bambi alive, prompting him to confront the family and announce that legal action will be taken. Buneng pleads with him to reconsider, and although Tonton admits he has feelings for her, he reveals he is obligated to report the fraud, as the insurance company is owned by his uncle.

After Tonton leaves, Bambi reprimands Biboy for his reckless spending, prompting him and his wife Mayet to accuse her of holding a grudge. Baby criticizes Bambi for being too forgiving, while Boy admits his fear of ending up alone like her. Frustrated, Bambi vents about being the family's sole provider for years without rest, only to be turned on once she can no longer support them. Their argument is interrupted when Paeng, Momshie's caregiver, informs them that Momshie has wandered off.

Bambi finds Momshie at a bus terminal, waiting for her daughter to return home from Taiwan. Momshie briefly regains lucidity and recognizes Bambi, who, overcome with emotion, reveals she is dying of glioblastoma. Overhearing this, her siblings reconcile with her and devote themselves to making the most of her final months. They redecorate her bedroom to resemble her dream home and stay by her side for her deathbed, as Bambi tells Biboy's children that she will be taken by a pink airplane to heaven. Bambi later dies, and at her funeral, her family spots a pink aircraft in the sky, symbolizing Bambi's dream job as a flight attendant guiding souls to the afterlife.

In a mid-credits scene, Tonton ultimately decides against pursuing charges against the Salvadors and enters into a relationship with Buneng, before joining the family for a photo together.

== Cast ==
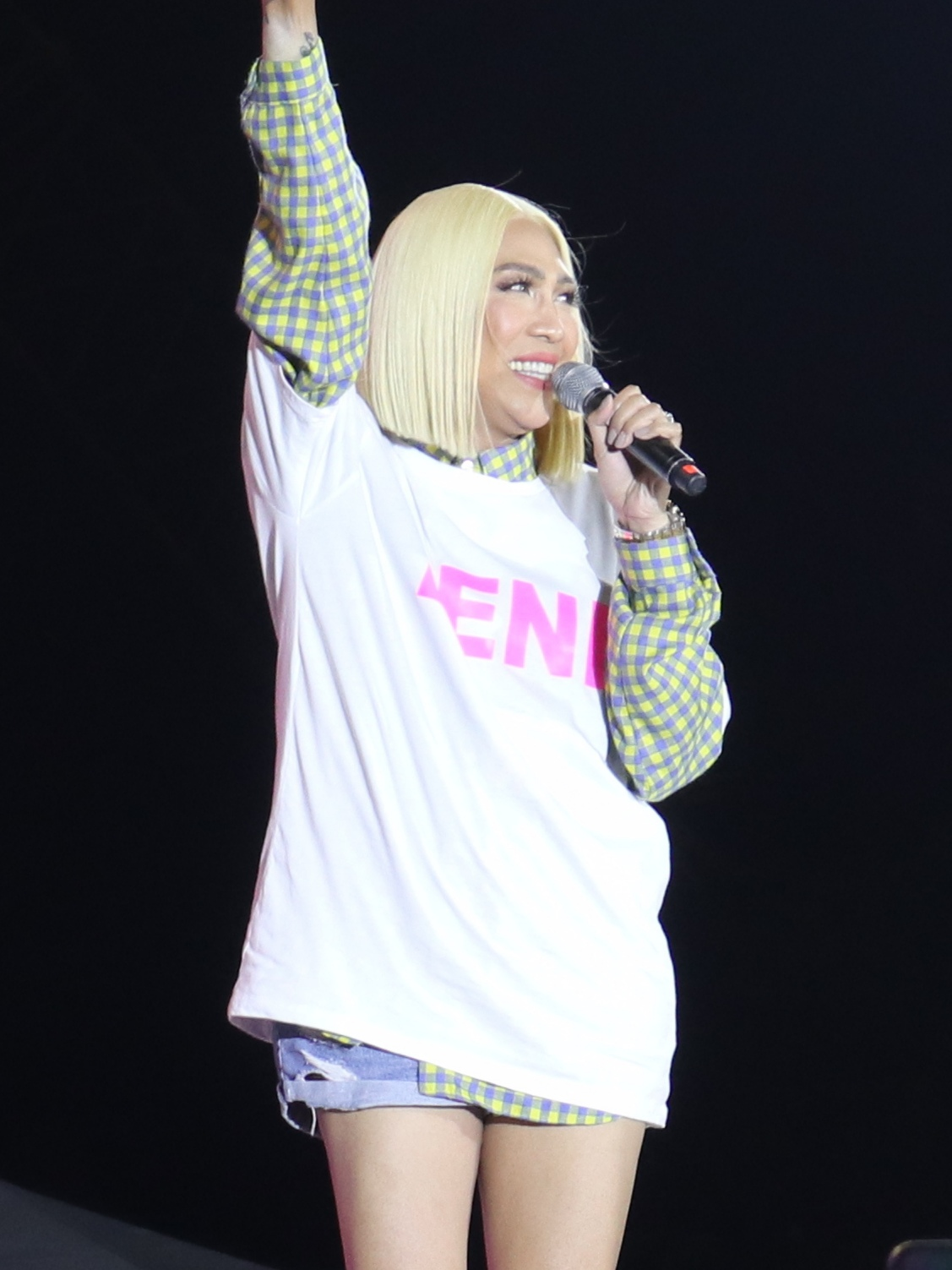
Vice Ganda portrays Bambi Salvador

Main cast

- Vice Ganda as Bamboo "Bambi" Salvador, the breadwinner of the Salvador family who works as OFW in Taiwan

Supporting cast

- Eugene Domingo as Baby Salvador, Bambi's oldest sister
- Jhong Hilario as Biboy Salvador, Bambi's younger brother and Mayet's husband
- Maris Racal as Bianca "Buneng" Salvador, Bambi's youngest sister
- Kokoy de Santos as Boy Salvador, Bambi's gay youngest brother
- Gladys Reyes as Mayet Salvador, Bambi's sister-in-law and Biboy's wife
- Anthony Jennings as Anton "Tonton" Cruz, a life insurance agent company work as an accounting manager
- Via Antonio as Paeng, Bambi's cousin and caregiver of Momshie Salvador
- Malou de Guzman as Momshie Salvador, Bambi's mother and Popshie Salvador's wife
- Argus Aspiras as Puge Salvador, younger son of Biboy and Mayet Salvador
- Kulot Caponpon as Danda Salvador, older daughter of Biboy and Mayet Salvador

Special participation

- Joel Torre as Popshie Salvador, Bambi's late father and Momshie's husband
- Kiko Matos as Tope
- Petite as Mikha, a colleague of Bambi in Taiwan
- Lassy Marquez as Jovie Miyaki, Izzy's husband and Bambi's friend and colleague in Taiwan
- MC Muah as Izzy Miyaki, Jovie's partner and Bambi's friend who works as a security guard
- Coco Martin as Elias, the brother of Mikha who works as a nurse
- Negi as Gwen, Bambi's friend and colleague, who works as a barber salon in Taiwan
- Bob Jbeili as Basketball Player

== Production ==
In 2023, Vice Ganda was supposed to do a project with The IdeaFirst Company originally scheduled for a 2023 Metro Manila Film Festival release but was postponed due to a scheduling conflict. In early 2024, Vice Ganda teased regarding a collaboration project with award-winning director Jun Lana during co-actors Gladys Reyes and Cristopher Roxas wedding anniversary celebration. On April 18, 2024, Vice Ganda posted a "new movie alert" teaser on his social media pages. On April 19, 2024, Director Lana joined Ganda on the noontime show It's Showtime to announce the title of the film. This is the first time Lana will direct Vice Ganda. Lana is known for his award-winning directing and writing works for the films Barber's Tales (2013), Die Beautiful (2016), Ang Dalawang Mrs. Reyes (2018) and About Us But Not About Us (2022).

Ganda noted how filming for And the Breadwinner Is... is the "most peaceful" in comparison to his previous projects. He also said that the film would have more drama compared to previous comedy films he appeared in.

Jhong Hilario, notable for his co-hosting duties on It's Showtime, has been announced as part of the film and expressed gratitude towards Vice Ganda for extending the opportunity citing the television series Ang Probinsyano as his last significant acting venture. The movie also served as his reunion with Lana, having worked previously together in two movies produced by GMA Pictures directed by Marilou Diaz-Abaya, Sa Pusod ng Dagat and Jose Rizal, where Lana served as writer and Hilario as cast member for the two films.

On July 16, 2024, it was announced as one of the five initial official entries for the 50th Metro Manila Film Festival – these are the films that were submitted as scripts. The announcement of remaining cast members then followed, which includes Eugene Domingo and Gina Pareño.

Filming started on June 27, 2024. On August 13, 2024, Vice Ganda and other cast members flew to Taiwan to shoot some of the scenes.

== Music ==
The song "Mapa" by Filipino boy band SB19 was used as the theme for the film. It was originally released in 2021 as part of the EP, Pagsibol.

== Release ==
And the Breadwinner Is... was theatrically released in cinemas in the Philippines on December 25, 2024, as one of the entries of the 50th Metro Manila Film Festival.

The film also scheduled to premier at Manila International Film Festival (MIFF) in Los Angeles. It also received a Japanese theatrical premiere via the 20th Osaka Asian Film Festival in Osaka on March 18, 2025. They also released on Netflix on June 12, 2025.

== Reception ==
=== Box office ===
The film earned more than ₱460 million in ticket sales by February 20, 2025 and was the seventh film starring Vice Ganda to earn more than ₱400 million. It was cited by the MMFF as one of the three top-grossing entries for its 2024 edition.

=== Critical reception ===
Josh Mercado, writing for ABS-CBN News, gave the film a positive review, praising the performance of lead star Vice Ganda for capturing the audiences' hearts for playing the family breadwinner which can relate to everyone, and writer-director Jun Lana for its direction. Hannah Malorca, writing for the Philippine Daily Inquirer, also gave praise not only to the lead star and director but also to the performances of the ensemble cast; however, in some aspects of the screenplay, she found faults for its lack of execution in featuring the harsh realities of Vice's character. Arman Cristobal, writing for SINEGANG.ph stated that the film allowed Vice Ganda to express her more intentional rapport while keeping her comedic spirit as well as she broke the stereotype of being ‘just a comedian' and could allow her to explore more serious roles in the future.

=== Accolades ===
Accolades received by And the Breadwinner Is...
| Year | Award | Category | Recipient(s) | Result | Ref. |
|---|---|---|---|---|---|
| 2024 | 50th Metro Manila Film Festival | Best Actor | Vice Ganda | Nominated | |
| 2024 | 50th Metro Manila Film Festival | Best Supporting Actor | Jhong Hilario | Nominated | |
| 2024 | 50th Metro Manila Film Festival | Best Supporting Actor | Kokoy de Santos | Nominated | |
| 2024 | 50th Metro Manila Film Festival | Best Float | And the Breadwinner Is... | Nominated | |
| 2024 | 50th Metro Manila Film Festival | Best Gender-Sensitive Film | And the Breadwinner Is... | Won | |
| 2024 | 50th Metro Manila Film Festival | Fernando Poe Jr. Memorial Award for Excellence | And the Breadwinner Is... | Nominated | |
| 2024 | 50th Metro Manila Film Festival | Special Jury Citation | Vice Ganda | Won | |
| 2025 | 3rd Gawad Dangal Filipino Awards | Best Picture | And The Breadwinner Is... | 2nd | |
| 2025 | 5th Pinoy Rebyu Awards | Best Lead Performance | Vice Ganda | Pending | |
| 2025 | 5th Pinoy Rebyu Awards | Best Ensemble Performance | Vice Ganda; Eugene Domingo; Joel Torre; Malou de Guzman; Gladys Reyes; Jhong Hilario; Maris Racal; Anthony Jennings; Kokoy de Santos; Via Antonio; MC Calaquian; Lassy; Kulot Caponpon; Argus Aspiras; Petite | Pending | |
| 2025 | Platinum Stallion National Media Awards | Best Film Artist Award | Vice Ganda | Won | |
| 2025 | Platinum Stallion National Media Awards | Film of the Year | And The Breadwinner Is... | Won | |
| 2025 | 8th EDDYS Awards | Best Actor | Vice Ganda | Pending | |
| 2025 | 8th EDDYS Awards | Best Musical Score | And the Breadwinner Is... | Pending | |
| 2025 | 6th VP Choice Awards | Movie Actor of the Year | Vice Ganda | Won | |
| 2025 | 73rd FAMAS Awards | Best Picture | And the Breadwinner Is... | Nominated | |
| 2025 | 73rd FAMAS Awards | Best Actor | Vice Ganda | Won (Note: Tied with Arjo Atayde.) | |
| 2025 | 73rd FAMAS Awards | Best Supporting Actor | Jhong Hilario | Nominated | |
| 2025 | 73rd FAMAS Awards | Best Supporting Actress | Eugene Domingo | Nominated | |
| 2025 | 73rd FAMAS Awards | Best Director | Jun Robles Lana | Nominated | |
| 2025 | 73rd FAMAS Awards | Best Cinematography | Carlo Mendoza | Nominated | |
| 2025 | 73rd FAMAS Awards | Best Musical Score | Teresa Barrozo | Nominated | |
| 2025 | 73rd FAMAS Awards | Best Sound | Denise Simone Lapuz | Nominated | |
| 2025 | 41st Star Awards for Movies | Movie Supporting Actress of the Year | Eugene Domingo | Pending | |
| 2025 | 41st Star Awards for Movies | Child Performer of the Year | Argus Aspiras | Pending | |
| 2025 | 41st Star Awards for Movies | Child Performer of the Year | Kulot Caponpon | Pending | |
| 2025 | 41st Star Awards for Movies | Darling of the Press | Gladys Reyes | Pending | |
| 2025 | 41st Star Awards for Movies | Movie Loveteam of the Year | Maris Racal & Anothony Jennings (MaThon) | Pending | |
