= Hold Me Close (film) =

2024 Philippine romantic fantasy film

- Theatrical release poster
- Directed by: Jason Paul Laxamana
- Written by: Jason Paul Laxamana
- Produced by: Vincent Del Rosario III; Veronique Del Rosario-Corpus; Valerie S. Del Rosario
- Starring: Carlo Aquino; Julia Barretto
- Cinematography: Rain Yamson II
- Edited by: Mai Calapardo
- Music by: Paulo Protacio
- Production company: Ninuno Media
- Distributed by: Viva Films
- Release dates: December 25, 2024 (MMFF); January 30, 2025 (MIFF)
- Running time: 98 minutes
- Country: Philippines
- Language: Filipino

Hold Me Close is a 2024 Philippine romantic fantasy film written and directed by Jason Paul Laxamana. It stars Carlo Aquino and Julia Barretto.

== Premise ==
Woody has spent seven years traveling worldwide to find a place to settle. He checks out Japan where he meets Lynlyn, who has the special ability to tell if a certain person will cause happiness or harm to her by merely touching them.

== Cast ==
- Carlo Aquino as Woody
- Julia Barretto as Lynlyn
- Jairus Aquino
- Migo Valid
- Shinya Inoue
- Yuya Shirakawa
- Hiroaki Mizayaki
- Ryota Hirata

== Production ==
The film is directed by Jason Paul Laxamana. It is a co-production of Viva Films and Ninuno Media. Principal photography for Hold Me Close started around late March 2024 in Japan.

== Release ==
Hold Me Close premiered in cinemas in the Philippines on December 25, 2024, as one of the official entries of the 50th Metro Manila Film Festival. It was part of the second batch of film entries announced, or submissions that belonged to the finished films category.

The film also scheduled to premier at Manila International Film Festival (MIFF) in Los Angeles on January 30, 2025.
