= Bituin Escalante =

Filipino singer and actress (born 1977)

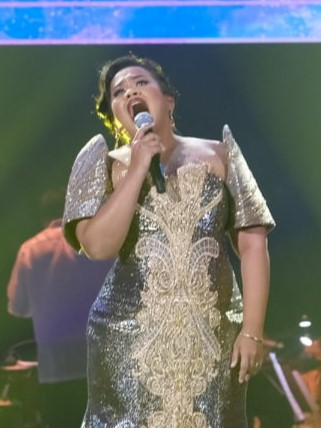
- Escalante in December 2021 performing at the 90th anniversary of the Manila Metropolitan Theater

Background information
- Born: Bituin Escalante Aguilos; April 23, 1977 (age 49); Manila, Philippines
- Genre: Pop
- Occupation: Singer
- Years active: 2000–present
- Label: Viva Records

Bituin Escalante (born April 23, 1977) is a Filipino singer, actress and host. She is considered the Philippines' best female vocalists having been active since 2000, and notably due to the success of her Himig Handog entry "Kung Ako Na Lang Sana".

== Career ==
Before her eventual rise through Metropop and Himig Handog, Escalante has been active in the theatrical scene since 1996 and has appeared in some television shows.

=== Discovery ===
Escalante rose to popularity after her first appearance in the 2000 Metropop Song Festival with her interpretation of "Paano Na", written by Arnold Reyes where she received the festival's second prize. In the following year, Bituin won awards as a new artist in the Philippine music industry.

Her 2002 song, "Kung Ako Na Lang Sana" written by Soc Villanueva, is the 2002 ABS-CBN Himig Handog Music Love Song Festival grand prize winner. She was also awarded Best Interpreter for this song and was later on given a platinum award for said album. She is one of the singers in ASAP.

== Current career and the first movie ==
Her debut film was Isang Himala, an official entry to the 2024 Metro Manila Film Festival. A musical drama based on the classic film Himala, it stars National Artist for Film and Broadcast Arts Nora Aunor in the original version, while the remake features singer, actress, pianist, and television host Aicelle Santos in the lead role.

== Discography ==
=== Theater ===
Year	Title	Role	Producer	Ref.
2005-2006	Once On This Island	Asaka	Actors Actor Inc. & Silang Production	
2008	Dreamgirls	Effie White		
2014	Pricilla : Queen of The Desert	Divas	Ultimate Productions	
2014	Pinocchio	Coachman	Repertory Philippines	
2015	Kung Papaano Akong Naging Leading Lady	Meily	Dalanghila Productions	
	Death and the Maiden	Paulina Escobar		
	Alice in Wonderland	Queen of Hearts		
2018-2019	Isang Himala	Aling Saling	9 Works Theatrical & Sandbox Collective	
2018	Waitress	Becky		

== Filmography ==
- Isang Himala (Official entry of the Metro Manila Film Festival 2024, Bituin's 1st debut movie)

== Awards ==
- 2001 ALIW Awards: Most Promising Female Artist
- 2001 Who's Who in the Philippines: Best Female Performer
- 2002 ABS-CBN Himig Handog Love Song Competition: Best Interpreter (song "Kung Ako na Lang Sana")
- 2003 Awit Awards: Song of the Year (Kung Ako Na Lang Sana)
- 2003 Awit Awards: Best Performance by a Female Artist
- 2007 Awit Awards: Best Performance by a Duo or Group (with Mon David)

== Personal life ==
Escalante is married to Reymund "Mano" Domingo. They have two children Tala and Luna.
