= Uninvited (2024 film) =

2024 Philippine mystery crime thriller film by Dan Villegas

- Theatrical release poster
- Directed by: Dan Villegas
- Written by: Dodo Dayao
- Produced by: John Bryan Diamente; Ronalyn D. Bana-ao; Antoinette Jadaone; Dan Villegas
- Starring: Vilma Santos; Aga Muhlach; Nadine Lustre
- Cinematography: Pao Orendain
- Edited by: Marya Ignacio
- Music by: Len Calvo
- Production companies: Mentorque Productions; Project 8 Projects
- Distributed by: Warner Bros. Pictures
- Release date: December 25, 2024
- Running time: 93 minutes
- Country: Philippines
- Languages: Filipino; English

Uninvited is a 2024 Philippine mystery crime thriller film co-produced and directed by Dan Villegas from a story and screenplay written by Dodo Dayao. Starring Vilma Santos, Aga Muhlach, and Nadine Lustre, the film revolves around a mother who seeks revenge on a billionaire at his birthday party for being responsible for her daughter's death.

The film is part of the ten official entries of the 50th Metro Manila Film Festival.

== Plot ==
Lilia Capistrano attends the lavish 55th birthday party of corrupt billionaire Guilly Vega at his mansion. She plans to kill Vega for the death of her only daughter, Lily, a decade prior. Scouting the party, she encounters her targets: Vega, his apathetic wife Katrina, his right-hand man Jigger Zulueta, his enforcers Celso Batac and Randall Ballesteros, his drug-addicted and rebellious daughter Nicole, and her boyfriend Mark. Vega also invites his political enemy, Colonel Red, to flaunt his ill-gotten wealth. Uninvited to the party, Lilia adopts the identity of Eva Candelaria, a donor who had donated a large sum to Katrina's foundation.

Flashbacks reveal Lilia was a teacher who lived with her only child Lily, a college student who is dating her childhood sweetheart Tofy. During a study date, Lily and Tofy were abducted by Vega's scouter Jomar Maitim. Maitim, Batac, and Ballesteros bring Lily to Vega to be raped while Tofy is tortured. Afterwards, the enforcers kill the couple and dump their bodies in a grassland where they are discovered.

Devastated following their children's deaths, Lilia and Tofy's mother Norma meet and deduce that Vega was responsible following a tip from Norma's police officer cousin; Vega would send his men to abduct teenage girls for him to rape, before they would be killed or let go, bribing their families into silence. Another victim of Vega, Tanya, commits suicide, and her father Elmer gives Lilia a list of Vega's lackeys. Lilia swears revenge on Vega and his men, and begins her plan by killing Maitim by running him over with a car.

In the present, cracks begin forming among Vega's inner circle. Nicole tells Mark that she resents her father for his various crimes but only stays with him because of his wealth. Katrina rebuffs her husband's seduction prior to the party, as she is dissatisfied with him and is secretly having an affair with Zulueta. Having tailed his wife's affair for some time, Vega kills Zulueta.

Lilia steals a carving knife from the party's catering and kills Batac when he is alone before taking his gun. Ballesteros, who had deduced Lilia's identity and informed Vega, engages in a gunfight with her, accidentally killing Mark and injuring Nicole in the crossfire. Lilia manages to kill Ballesteros before holding Nicole at gunpoint, planning to kill her as "a daughter for a daughter." Nicole reveals that she is a victim of her father as well, having been sexually abused by him since she was a child. Having overheard the gunfire, Vega arrives and holds Lilia at gunpoint, forcing her to stand down. Nicole offers to take Lilia's gun and kill her herself, but she instead shoots Vega, enabling Lilia to stab him to death. Prompted by Nicole to flee, Lilia leaves the party, satisfied at finally avenging her daughter's death.

In a mid-credits scene, Red discovers Vega's lifeless body and gloats over it.

== Cast ==
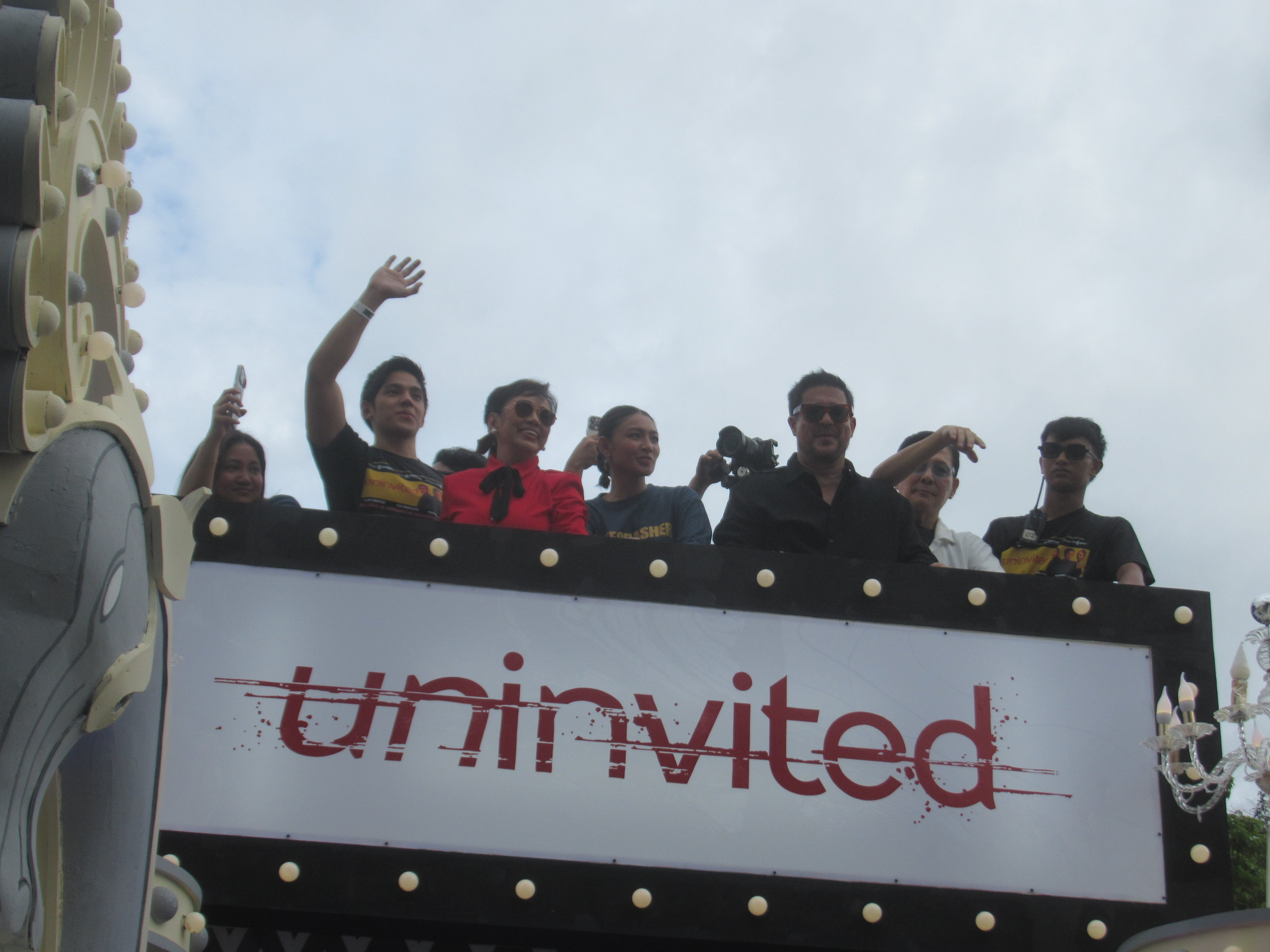
Cast of Uninvited during the MMFF Parade of Stars 2024 in Manila

- Vilma Santos as Lilia Capistrano / Eva Candelaria, a woman who poses as a socialite to crash Guilly's party to avenge her daughter's death.
- Aga Muhlach as Guilly Vega, a billionaire who hosts a lavish party for his own birthday. He murdered Eva's only daughter a decade ago before the start of the film's main story.
- Nadine Lustre as Nicolette Chantal "Nicole" Remegio Vega, Vega's drug-addicted daughter who resents her father.
- Tirso Cruz III as Colonel Red Zaldarriaga, Vega's former friend-turned-enemy who was invited to the party.
- Mylene Dizon as Katrina Vega, Vega's unsatisfied wife who runs a foundation.
- Gabby Padilla as Lilia Nieves "Lily" Capistrano, Lilia's late daughter.
- Elijah Canlas as Christopher Norman 'Tofy' Almario, Lily's boyfriend.
- RK Bagatsing as Jigger Zulueta, Vega's right-hand man.
- Lotlot de Leon as Norma Almario, Tofy's mother and Lilia's close friend.
- Ketchup Eusebio as Jomar Maitim, Guilly's pimp.
- Cholo Barretto as Celso Batac, Guilly's ruthless henchman and bodyguard.
- Gio Alvarez as Randall Ballesteros, a corrupt police officer who is Guilly's co-operative fixer.
- Ron Angeles as Mark, Nicole's boyfriend who supplies her with cocaine.
- Nonie Buencamino as Elmer Gatdula, the father of another victim of Vega.
- Samantha Samarita as Tanya Gatdula, the late daughter of Elmer who is also another victim of Vega.

== Production ==
Uninvited, with a working title of Project Red, was co-produced by Mentorque Productions and Project 8 Projects, with Dan Villegas as its director and Dodo Dayao as its writer. While Dayao is credited as Uninvited's writer, co-star Vilma Santos provided significant output for the film's story. Due to Santos' candidacy for Batangas governor in the upcoming 2025 Philippine elections, production of the film was expedited.Uninvited also marks as Villegas' return in film directing since Hintayan ng Langit in 2018.

Mentorque has hinted that it has proposed several film projects for Santos as early as May 2024. Among these proposals were for a thriller film and Santos expressed interest to star in a type of project that she has never done before. In August 2024, Mentorque announced its collaboration with Project 8 Projects for a "dark" film starring Santos. Santos describes the film as a happening in 24 hours which starts nice but ends as "dilapidated". Lustre agreed to work in Uninvited after learning that Santos and Mulach are involved in the film. Lustre remarked that her role as Nicole is "very extreme" and is largely a "polar opposite" on how she acts in real life.

Principal photography was already underway for the film as of September 2024. Production for Uninvited needed to be finished by the end of the month to be an eligible entry for the second batch of films for the 2024 Metro Manila Film Festival. The title of the film was announced in that month. Uninvited was filmed in several houses with the scenes edited in post-production to make it seem like they were set in one huge mansion.

The production team claims that Uninvited is the first film in the Philippines to be filmed with a pair of custom-built Cooke Optics Anamorphic Full Frame Special Flare lenses fitted in an Arri Alexa 35 digital cinema camera. CMB Film Services procured the equipment with the preferred specifications given by cinematographer Pao Orendain. The studio says the cost of the lens alone is enough to produce another film by itself.

The production team rejected the Movie and Television Review and Classification Board's recommendation to cut out some scenes for a more lenient rating, from R-16 to R-13.

== Release ==
Uninvited was released theatrically on December 25, 2024, as one of the entries for the 50th Metro Manila Film Festival by Warner Bros. Pictures Philippines. In addition, Viva Films handled worldwide sales for this film. The film is also scheduled to premiere at the Manila International Film Festival (MIFF) in Los Angeles on March 6, 2025.

It is also planned to be screened in cinemas outside the Philippines during the film festival's run. The organizers have allowed screenings for the film, provided that it would not be streamed online during the exhibition's run.

== Soundtrack ==
The movie's theme song is "Hahamakin Ang Lahat", interpreted by KZ Tandingan and Arthur Nery.

== Reception ==
Jessica Ann Evangelista of the Philippine Daily Inquirer praised Santos’ performance, calling it the film's biggest strength. Evangelista then described the film as a brutal, emotionally intense revenge thriller that primarily works because of its performances.

Nicol Latayan of International Cinephile Society wrote, “Uninvited takes us on a memorable night as we follow a grieving mother on a mission,” and rated the film 4.5 out of 5 stars.

Karen Calirawa of PEP.ph described the film as “a gripping masterpiece worthy of the four rounds of applause it received during its world premiere.”

=== Accolades ===
Accolades received by Uninvited
Year	Award	Category	Recipient(s)	Result	Ref.
2024	50th Metro Manila Film Festival	Best Actress	Vilma Santos	Nominated	
2024	50th Metro Manila Film Festival	Best Supporting Actress	Gabby Padilla	Nominated	
2024	50th Metro Manila Film Festival	Best Supporting Actress	Nadine Lustre	Nominated	
2024	50th Metro Manila Film Festival	Best Cinematography	Pao Orendain	Nominated	
2024	50th Metro Manila Film Festival	Best Original Theme Song	"Hahamakin ang Lahat"	Nominated	
2024	50th Metro Manila Film Festival	Best Float	Uninvited	Won	
2025	8th EDDYS Awards	Best Supporting Actress	Nadine Lustre	Nominated	
2025	8th EDDYS Awards	Best Supporting Actor	Aga Muhlach	Won	
2025	8th EDDYS Awards	Best Original Theme Song	"Hahamakin Ang Lahat” — KZ Tandingan and Arthur Nery	Nominated	
2025	2025 FAMAS Awards	Best Picture	Uninvited	Nominated	
2025	2025 FAMAS Awards	Best Director	Dan Villegas	Nominated	
2025	2025 FAMAS Awards	Best Actor	Aga Muhlach	Nominated	
2025	2025 FAMAS Awards	Best Supporting Actress	Nadine Lustre	Won	
2025	2025 FAMAS Awards	Best Cinematography	Pao Orendain	Nominated	
2025	2025 FAMAS Awards	Best Sound	Uninvited	Nominated	
2025	2025 FAMAS Awards	Best Song (Theme Song)	"Hahamakin ang Lahat" – Uninvited	Nominated	
2025	2025 FAMAS Awards	Best Musical Score	Len Calvo	Nominated	
2025	2025 FAMAS Awards	FAMAS Circle of Excellence Award	Vilma Santos	Won	
2025	41st PMPC Star Awards for Movies	Movie of the Year	Uninvited	Won	
2025	41st PMPC Star Awards for Movies	Movie Director of the Year	Dan Villegas	Won	
2025	41st PMPC Star Awards for Movies	Movie Actor of the Year	Aga Muhlach	Won (Note: Tied with Dennis Trillo.)	
2025	41st PMPC Star Awards for Movies	Movie Actress of the Year	Vilma Santos	Won	
2025	41st PMPC Star Awards for Movies	Movie Supporting Actress of the Year	Nadine Lustre	Nominated	
2025	41st PMPC Star Awards for Movies	Movie Ensemble Acting of the Year	Uninvited	Won	
2025	41st PMPC Star Awards for Movies	Movie Screenwriter of the Year	Dado Dayao	Nominated	
2025	41st PMPC Star Awards for Movies	Movie Cinematographer of the Year	Pao Orendain	Won	
2025	41st PMPC Star Awards for Movies	Movie Editor of the Year	Marya Ignacio	Nominated	
2025	41st PMPC Star Awards for Movies	Movie Musical of the Year	Len Calvo	Nominated	
2025	41st PMPC Star Awards for Movies	Movie Production Designer of the Year	Mic Tatad King	Won	
2025	41st PMPC Star Awards for Movies	Movie Sound Engineer of the Year	Roy Santos	Nominated	
2025	41st PMPC Star Awards for Movies	Movie Theme Song of the Year	“Hahamakin Ang Lahat” – KZ Tandingan and Arthur Nery	Nominated	
