= My Future You =

2024 Philippine romantic comedy film

- Theatrical release poster
- Directed by: Crisanto B. Aquino
- Written by: Crisanto B. Aquino
- Produced by: Lily Y. Monteverde; Roselle Monteverde; Keith Monteverde
- Starring: Francine Diaz; Seth Fedelin
- Cinematography: Jan Oliver Evangelista
- Edited by: Vanessa U. De Leon
- Music by: Decky Jazer Margaja
- Production company: Regal Entertainment
- Distributed by: Regal Films
- Release date: December 25, 2024
- Running time: 109 minutes
- Country: Philippines
- Language: Filipino

My Future You is a 2024 Philippine romantic comedy film written and directed by Crisanto B. Aquino. Starring Francine Diaz and Seth Fedelin, it revolves around two strangers from different timelines meeting each other in a dating app. It co-stars Almira Muhlach, Christian Vasquez, Peewee O'Hara, Bodjie Pascua, Mosang, and Izzy Canillo.

Produced and distributed by Regal Entertainment, the film was released on December 25, 2024, as one of the official entries for the 50th Metro Manila Film Festival.

== Premise ==
Karen (Francine Diaz) and Lex (Seth Fedelin) meet each other on an online dating app. They live in two different timelines, set fifteen years apart, whose connection was made possible through a comet. After learning their strange situation, they work on changing the past to alter their fate.

== Cast ==
- Francine Diaz as Karenina "Karen" Lopez
  - Ryrie Sophia Turingan as young Karen
- Seth Fedelin as Alexander "Lex" Ramos
  - Luis Mikael Capiral as young Lex
- Christian Vazquez as Miguel, Karen and Troy's stepfather
- Almira Muhlach as Pamela, Karen's mother
- Izzy Canillo as Troy, Karen's younger brother
- Peewee O’Hara as Rica Ramos, Lex's adoptive mother
- Bodjie Pascua as Erwin Ramos, Lex's adoptive father
- Mosang as Berns, the Ramos family maid
- Marcus Madrigal as Tony, Karen and Troy's father
- Vance Larena as Paco, Lex' biological brother
- Donna Cariaga as Flower Vendor

== Production ==
My Future You is a Regal Films production directed by Crisanto Aquino. It is the film debut of Francine Diaz and Seth Fedelin as a love team who are collectively known as FranSeth. It was among the last three approved by production by Regal Films producer Lily Monteverde prior to her death in August 2024.

The script for the film was made in 2020. The concept of the film revolves around two strangers who met in two different timelines who works together to alter their fate. Diaz hinted that the movie had a mature take in its story.

Members of the cast reportedly had script reading session in April 2024. Principal photography of My Future You was scheduled for April 23.

== Release ==
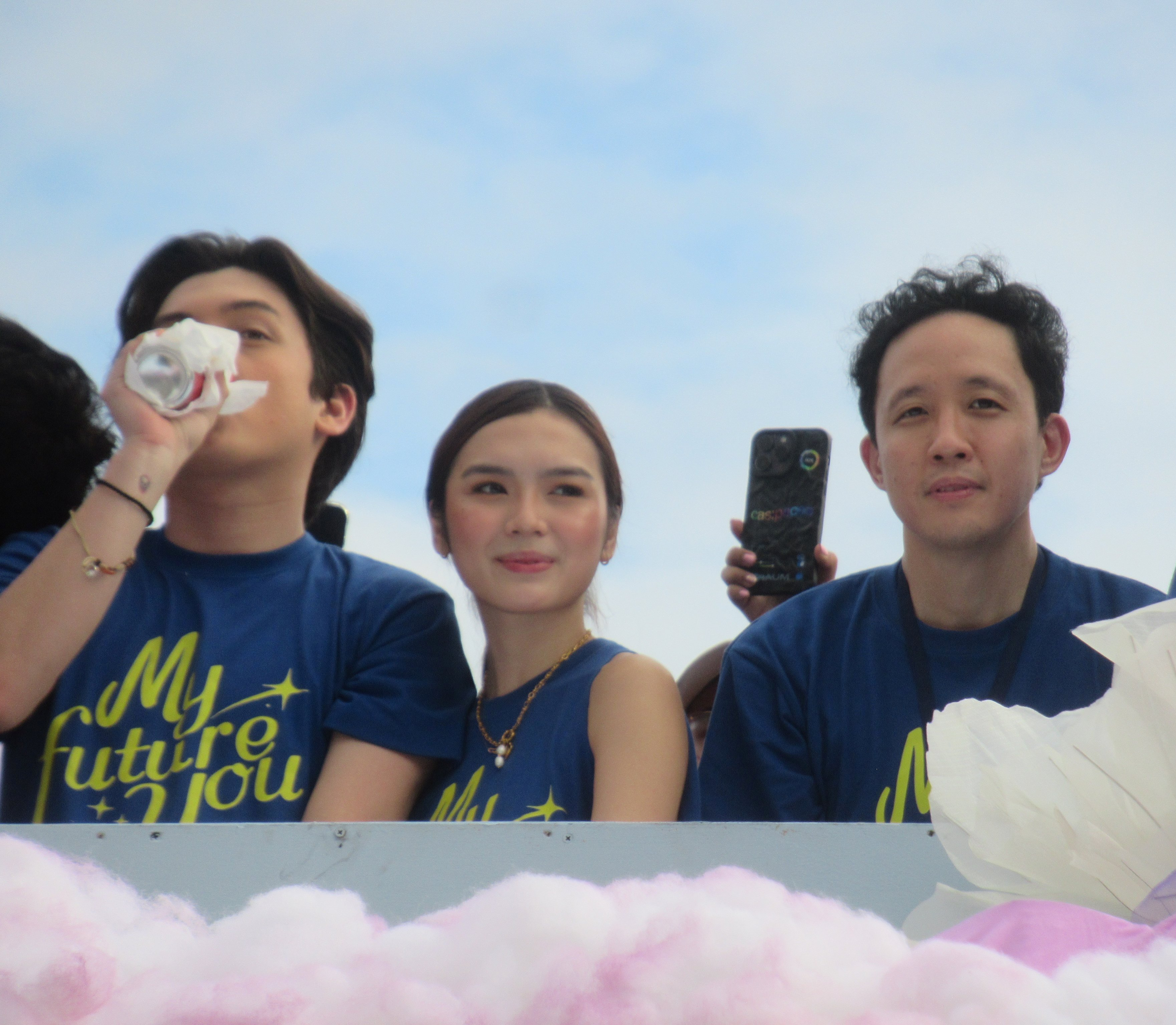

My Future You's red carpet premiere was held at SM Megamall and is set to premiere in cinemas in the Philippines on December 25, 2024, as one of the official entries of the 50th Metro Manila Film Festival. It was part of the second batch of film entries announced, or submissions that belonged to the finished films category. The film also scheduled to premier at Manila International Film Festival (MIFF) in Los Angeles on January 30, 2025.

My Future You is one of the last films greenlit by Lily Monteverde before her death in August 2024. Her daughter, co-producer Roselle Monteverde-Teo, announced that the film will honor her mother and father, Leonardo "Remy".

== Reception ==
=== Critical response ===
My Future You received positive reviews upon release. Mark Angelo Ching of Philippine Entertainment Portal described the film as "funny, sweet and heartwarming" with emphasis on Diaz's performance, stating that she "carries much of the film’s emotional weight." Writing for Entertainment Inquirer, Hannah Malorca opined that the chemistry of the two leads is the highlight of the film, stating that their performances made up for the film's flaws.

=== Accolades ===
Accolades received by My Future You
Award	Date of ceremony	Category	Recipient(s)	Result	Ref.
2024 Metro Manila Film Festival	December 27, 2024	Best Picture	My Future You	3rd	
2024 Metro Manila Film Festival	December 27, 2024	Best Director	Crisanto Aquino	Won	
2024 Metro Manila Film Festival	December 27, 2024	Best Actor	Seth Fedelin	Nominated	
2024 Metro Manila Film Festival	December 27, 2024	Best Actress	Francine Diaz	Nominated	
2024 Metro Manila Film Festival	December 27, 2024	Best Screenplay	Crisanto Aquino	Nominated	
2024 Metro Manila Film Festival	December 27, 2024	Best Editing	Vanessa Ubas De Leon	Won	
2024 Metro Manila Film Festival	December 27, 2024	Best Visual Effects	Santelmo Studio Inc.	Nominated	
2024 Metro Manila Film Festival	December 27, 2024	Fernando Poe Jr. Memorial Award for Excellence	My Future You	Nominated	
2024 Metro Manila Film Festival	December 27, 2024	Best Float	My Future You	Nominated	
2024 Metro Manila Film Festival	December 27, 2024	Breakthrough Performance Award	Seth Fedelin	Won	
2024 Metro Manila Film Festival	December 27, 2024	Breakthrough Performance Award	Francine Diaz	Nominated	
2025 Manila International Film Festival	March 7, 2025	Best Director	Cristanto Aquino	Won	
2025 Manila International Film Festival	March 7, 2025	Best Actor	Seth Fedelin	Won	
The EDDYS	July 20, 2025	Best Editing	Vanessa Ubas de Leon	Won	
The EDDYS	July 20, 2025	Best Original Theme Song	"Museo" by Eliza Maturan	Won	
The EDDYS	July 20, 2025	Best Visual Effects	Santelmo Studio Inc.	Nominated	
41st Star Awards for Movies	November 30, 2025	Movie of the Year	My Future You	Nominated	
41st Star Awards for Movies	November 30, 2025	Movie Director of the Year	Crisanto Aquino	Nominated	
41st Star Awards for Movies	November 30, 2025	Movie Actor of the Year	Seth Fedelin	Nominated	
41st Star Awards for Movies	November 30, 2025	Movie Screenwriter of the Year	Crisanto Aquino	Nominated	
41st Star Awards for Movies	November 30, 2025	Movie Editor of the Year	Vanessa Ubas De Leon	Nominated	
41st Star Awards for Movies	November 30, 2025	Movie Loveteam of the Year	Francine Diaz and Seth Fedelin	Won	
