= Espantaho =

2024 supernatural horror film by Chito S. Roño

- Theatrical release poster
- Directed by: Chito S. Roño
- Screenplay by: Chris Martinez
- Produced by: Patricia Sumagui
- Starring: Judy Ann Santos; Lorna Tolentino; Chanda Romero
- Cinematography: Neil Daza
- Edited by: Benjo Ferrer
- Music by: Von de Guzman
- Production companies: Quantum Films; Cineko Productions; Purple Bunny Productions
- Release date: December 25, 2024
- Running time: 90 minutes
- Country: Philippines
- Language: Filipino

Espantaho (lit. 'Scarecrow') is a 2024 Philippine supernatural horror film directed by Chito S. Roño from a screenplay by Chris Martinez. It stars Judy Ann Santos, Lorna Tolentino and Chanda Romero. The film is part of ten official entries to the 50th Metro Manila Film Festival.

== Plot ==
The film opens on the death of the family patriarch, Pabling. Pabling's daughter, Monet, who is mourning over his death had a seizure and lost consciousness. While unconscious, Monet had a vision of her father warning her not to let "him" into the house.
This film focuses on the traditional funeral rituals and customs at the Lazatin-Henson-Katigbak Mansion (Mexico, Pampanga).

== Cast ==
=== Main Cast ===
- Judy Ann Santos as Monet
- Lorna Tolentino as Rosa - mother of Monet
- Chanda Romero as Adele - legal wife of Pabling
- Agung Gede as Evil
- Janice de Belen as Andie - Roy's sister and Monet's half-sister
- JC Santos as Jack - Monet's lover and Keith's father
- Mon Confiado as Roy - Andie's brother and Monet's half-brother
- Nico Antonio as Henri
- Donna Cariaga as Frida
- Kian Co as Keith - son of Monet and Jack
- Eugene Domingo as Georgia
- Tommy Abuel as Prof. Manalastas
- Archi Adamos as Silvio Madamba
- Junyka Santarin as young Rosa
- Atasha Franco sa young Monet

== Production ==
On September 12, 2024, Quantum Films in their 20th year anniversary revealed in their social media page their upcoming horror film titled Espantaho with its logo and official cast leading by Judy Ann Santos and Lorna Tolentino. Aside from Santos and Tolentino, Chanda Romero, Mon Confiado, JC Santos, Donna Cariaga, Nico Antonio, Kian Co and Janice de Belen are confirmed to be part cast with Tommy Abuel and Eugene Domingo revealed that have special roles in the film.
The role of Lorna Tolentino was supposed to be played by Vilma Santos. Vilma stated that there was some "problem" on the character and later withdrew from the project to act in Uninvited, which Vilma said is a "dream story". This marks Tolentino's return to acting in horror films since 1995's Patayin sa Sindak si Barbara. While Chanda Romero's role was supposed to be played by Charo Santos.

== Release ==
The film was released theatrically on December 25, 2024, as part of the 2024 Metro Manila Film Festival. The film also scheduled to premier at Manila International Film Festival (MIFF) in Los Angeles on January 30, 2025.

== Accolades ==
Accolades received by Espantaho
| Award | Date of ceremony | Category | Recipient(s) | Result | Ref. |
|---|---|---|---|---|---|
| 45th Fantasporto International Film Festival | March 8, 2025 | Best Actress | Judy Ann Santos | Won | |
| 2024 Metro Manila Film Festival | December 27, 2024 | Best Actress | Judy Ann Santos | Won | |
| 2024 Metro Manila Film Festival | December 27, 2024 | Best Supporting Actress | Lorna Tolentino | Nominated | |
| 2024 Metro Manila Film Festival | December 27, 2024 | Best Supporting Actress | Chanda Romero | Nominated | |
| 2024 Metro Manila Film Festival | December 27, 2024 | Best Screenplay | Chris Martinez | Nominated | |
| 2024 Metro Manila Film Festival | December 27, 2024 | Best Cinematography | Neil Daza | Nominated | |
| 2024 Metro Manila Film Festival | December 27, 2024 | Best Production Design | Angel Diesta | Nominated | |
| 2024 Metro Manila Film Festival | December 27, 2024 | Best Editing | Benjo Ferrer | Nominated | |
| 2024 Metro Manila Film Festival | December 27, 2024 | Best Sound Engineering | Alex Tomboc & Lamberto Casas Jr. | Nominated | |
| 2024 Metro Manila Film Festival | December 27, 2024 | Best Musical Score | Von De Guzman | Nominated | |
| 2024 Metro Manila Film Festival | December 27, 2024 | Best Visual Effects | Gaspar Mangarin and Walter Monte | Nominated | |
| 2024 Metro Manila Film Festival | December 27, 2024 | Best Child Performer | Kean Co | Nominated | |
| 2024 Metro Manila Film Festival | December 27, 2024 | Best Float | Espantaho | Nominated | |
| 8th EDDYS Awards | July 20, 2025 | Best Actress | Judy Ann Santos | Nominated | |
| 8th EDDYS Awards | July 20, 2025 | Best Supporting Actress | Chanda Romero | Nominated | |
| 8th EDDYS Awards | July 20, 2025 | Best Supporting Actress | Lorna Tolentino | Won | |
| 8th EDDYS Awards | July 20, 2025 | Best Cinematography | Neil Daza | Nominated | |
| 8th EDDYS Awards | July 20, 2025 | Best Visual Effects | Gaspar Mangarin and Walter Monte | Won | |
| 8th EDDYS Awards | July 20, 2025 | Best Sound | Alex Tomboc & Lamberto Casas Jr. | Nominated | |
| 2025 FAMAS Awards | August 22, 2025 | Best Director | Chito S. Roño | Nominated | |
| 2025 FAMAS Awards | August 22, 2025 | Best Actress | Judy Ann Santos | Nominated | |
| 2025 FAMAS Awards | August 22, 2025 | Best Visual Effects | Gaspar Mangarin and Walter Monte | Won | |
| 2025 FAMAS Awards | August 22, 2025 | Best Production Design | Angel Diesta | Nominated | |
| 2025 FAMAS Awards | August 22, 2025 | FAMAS Child Icon of Philippine Cinema | Judy Ann Santos | Won | |
| 2025 FAMAS Awards | August 22, 2025 | Susan Roces Celebrity Award | Lorna Tolentino | Won | |
| 2025 FAMAS Awards | August 22, 2025 | Nora Aunor Superstar Award | Judy Ann Santos | Won | |
| 27th Gawad Pasado | October 25, 2025 | Pinakapasadong Pelikula | Espantaho | Nominated | |
| 27th Gawad Pasado | October 25, 2025 | Pinakapasadong Direktor | Chito Roño | Nominated | |
| 27th Gawad Pasado | October 25, 2025 | Pinakapasadong Aktress | Judy Ann Santos | Nominated | |
| 27th Gawad Pasado | October 25, 2025 | Pinakapasadong Katuwang Na Aktress | Chandra Romero | Nominated | |
| 27th Gawad Pasado | October 25, 2025 | Pinakapasadong Katuwang Na Aktress | Lorna Tolentino | Nominated | |
| 27th Gawad Pasado | October 25, 2025 | Pinakapasadong Batang Aktor/Aktres | Kain Co | Nominated | |
| 27th Gawad Pasado | October 25, 2025 | Pinakapasadong Disenyong Produksyon | Angel B. Diesta | Nominated | |
| 27th Gawad Pasado | October 25, 2025 | Pinakapasadong Sinematograpiya | Neil Daza | Nominated | |
| 27th Gawad Pasado | October 25, 2025 | Pinakapasadong Editing | Benjo Ferrer | Nominated | |
| 27th Gawad Pasado | October 25, 2025 | Pinakapasadong Tunog | Alex Tomboc & Lamberto Casas Jr. | Nominated | |
| 41st Star Awards for Movies | November 30, 2025 | Movie of the Year | Espantaho | Nominated | |
| 41st Star Awards for Movies | November 30, 2025 | Movie Director of the Year | Chito S. Roño | Nominated | |
| 41st Star Awards for Movies | November 30, 2025 | Movie Actress of the Year | Judy Ann Santos | Nominated | |
| 41st Star Awards for Movies | November 30, 2025 | Movie Supporting Actress of the Year | Chanda Romero | Nominated | |
| 41st Star Awards for Movies | November 30, 2025 | Movie Supporting Actress of the Year | Lorna Tolentino | Nominated | |
| 41st Star Awards for Movies | November 30, 2025 | Child Performer of the Year | Kian Co | Nominated | |
| 41st Star Awards for Movies | November 30, 2025 | Movie Ensemble Acting of the Year | Espantaho | Nominated | |
| 41st Star Awards for Movies | November 30, 2025 | Movie Screenwriter of the Year | Chris Martinez | Nominated | |
| 41st Star Awards for Movies | November 30, 2025 | Movie Cinematographer of the Year | Neil Daza | Nominated | |
| 41st Star Awards for Movies | November 30, 2025 | Movie Editor of the Year | Benjo Ferrer | Nominated | |
| 41st Star Awards for Movies | November 30, 2025 | Movie Musical Scorer of the Year | Von De Guzman | Nominated | |
| 41st Star Awards for Movies | November 30, 2025 | Movie Production Designer of the Year | Angel Diesta | Nominated | |
| 41st Star Awards for Movies | November 30, 2025 | Movie Sound Engineer of the Year | Lamberto Casas & Alex Tomboc | Nominated | |
