= Fernando Poe Jr. Memorial Award for Excellence =

Annual film award in the Philippines

- Awarded for: Film excellence
- Country: Philippines
- Presented by: MMDA
- First award: 2012
- Currently held by: Bar Boys: After School (2025)
- Website: www.mmda.gov.ph/mmff/

Fernando Poe Jr. Memorial Award for Excellence is an annual award made by the Metro Manila Film Festival in honor of actor Fernando Poe Jr. Star Cinema's One More Try was the first recipient, in 2012.

The award is currently held by Bar Boys: After School.

== 2016 Controversy ==
For the 42nd Metro Manila Film Festival, Oro, a film directed by Alvin Yapan was awarded as the Fernando Poe Jr. Memorial Award for Excellence recipient on December 29, 2016. Due to issues surrounding the "dog slaughter scene", the family of the late Fernando Poe Jr. decided to revoke the award won by the film.

== Special Award winners ==
Year	Film	Production Company(ies)	Ref
2012 (38th)	One More Try	Star Cinema	
2013 (39th)	10,000 Hours	Philippine Film Studios, N2 Productions and Viva Films	
2014 (40th)	Bonifacio: Ang Unang Pangulo	Philippians Productions	
2015 (41st)	#WalangForever	Quantum Films, MJM Productions, Tuko Film Productions, Buchi Boy Films	
2016 (42nd)	Oro	Feliz Film Productions (withdrawn)	
2017 (43rd)	Ang Panday	CCM Film Productions, Viva Films, Star Cinema	
2018 (44th)	Jack Em Popoy: The Puliscredibles	CCM Film Productions, APT Entertainment, M-Zet Productions	
2019 (45th)	Mindanao	Center Stage Productions, Solar Pictures	
2020 (46th)	Magikland	Brightlight Productions, Gallaga Reyes Films	
2021 (47th)	A Hard Day	Viva Films	
2022 (48th)	Mamasapano: Now It Can Be Told	Borracho Film Production and Viva Films	
2023 (49th)	When I Met You In Tokyo	JG Productions Inc.	
2024 (50th)	Topakk	Nathan Studios, Strawdog Studios, FUSEE	
2025 (51st)	Bar Boys: After School	901 Studios	
