= 2026 FAMAS Awards =

73rd FAMAS Awards

74th FAMAS Awards
- Date: October 27, 2026
- Site: Manila Hotel, Manila

Highlights
- Best Picture: In Thy Name
- Most awards: In Thy Name (4), Quezon (4)
- Most nominations: In Thy Name (12), Quezon (12)

The 74th Filipino Academy of Movie Arts and Sciences (FAMAS) Awards is set to take place on October 27, 2026, at the Fiesta Pavilion of Manila Hotel in Manila, Philippines. It honors the best Filipino films released in 2025. On September 26, 2026, the official nominees are revealed on the FAMAS organization's official Facebook page by DJ Josa and FAMAS Best Supporting Actor winner, Johnrey Rivas. Two historical films received the most nominations (12): Caesar Soriano's In Thy Name, a film about the abduction of Fr. Rhoel Gallardo by the Abu Sayyaf militants, and Jerrold Tarog's Quezon, a biographical film about the rise of Philippine President Manuel L. Quezon.

For the second year in a row, a separate nomination and awards night are conferred for the best short-form films of 2025.

== Winners and nominees ==
=== Awards ===
Winners are listed first, highlighted in boldface.

**Best Picture**: **In Thy Name**; I'mPerfect; Magellan; Quezon; Sunshine	**Best Director**: **Ceasar Soriano – In Thy Name**; Antoinette Jadaone – Sunshine; Jerrold Tarog – Quezon; Kip Oebanda – Bar Boys: After School; Sigrid Andrea Bernardo – I'mPerfect
**Best Actor**: **McCoy de Leon – In Thy Name as Fr. Rhoel Gallardo**; Carlo Aquino – Bar Boys: After School as Erik Vincencio; Earl Jonathan Amaba – I'mPerfect as Jiro; Jericho Rosales – Quezon as President Manuel L. Quezon; Piolo Pascual – Manila's Finest as Capt. Homer Magtibay	**Best Actress**: **Maricel Soriano – Meet, Greet & Bye as Baby Lopez-Facundo**; Angelica Panganiban – Unmarry as Celine Santos; Charo Santos – Only We Know as Betty; Krystel Go – I'mPerfect as Jessica; Maris Racal – Sunshine as Sunshine Francisco
**Best Supporting Actor**: **Mon Confiado – Quezon as President Emilio Aguinaldo**; JC de Vera – In Thy Name as Khadaffy Janjalani; Rico Blanco – Manila's Finest as Epifanio Javier; Tom Rodriguez – Unmarry as Stephen Alcaraz; Will Ashley – Bar Boys: After School as Arvin Asuncion	**Best Supporting Actress**: **Karylle Tatlonghari – Quezon as First Lady Aurora Quezon**; Elora Españo – In Thy Name as Lydda; Jennica Garcia – Sunshine as Geleen; Odette Khan – Bar Boys: After School as Justice Bing Hernandez; Rochelle Pangilinan – Child No. 82: Anak ni Boy Kana as Alicia
**Best Child Performer**: **Annika Co – Sunshine as Bata**; Lucas Andalio – Call Me Mother as Angelo "Angel" de Jesus; Zac Sibug – Unmarry as Elio	**Best Screenplay**: **Bar Boys: After School**; In Thy Name; Quezon; Sunshine; Unmarry
**Best Cinematography**: **Quezon**; I'mPerfect; In Thy Name; Manila's Finest; Sunshine	**Best Editing**: **Quezon**; In Thy Name; Magellan; Manila's Finest; Sunshine
**Best Production Design**: **Manila's Finest**; In Thy Name; Magellan; Quezon; Shake, Rattle & Roll: Evil Origins	**Best Sound**: **Manila's Finest**; Child No. 82: Anak ni Boy Kana; In Thy Name; Quezon; Sunshine
**Best Visual Effects**: **In Thy Name**; Child No. 82: Anak ni Boy Kana; KMJS' Gabi ng Lagim: The Movie; Quezon; Shake, Rattle & Roll: Evil Origins	**Best Score**: **Song of the Fireflies**; Call Me Mother; In Thy Name; Manila's Finest; Quezon

== FAMAS Short Film Festival winners ==
The nomination night for the FAMAS Short Film Festival is set for October 9, 2026 with the awards night on November 11, 2026.

== Honorary Awards ==
The following were the other special honorary awards.

- FAMAS Actress of Distinction Award – Maris Racal
- Circle of Excellence Award for Best Director – Lav Diaz
- FAMAS Grand Maestro Award for Lifetime Achievement in Film Directing – Jose Javier Reyes
- Susan Roces Celebrity Award – Charo Santos
- FPJ Memorial Award for Excellence – Daniel Fernando
- Nora Aunor Superstar Award – Bea Alonzo
- FAMAS Queen of Philippine Cinema – Dina Bonnevie
- FAMAS Youth Achievement Award – Bini and SB19
- Presidential Award – Raymond Francisco
- FAMAS Presidential Award for Loyalty and Service – Mary Joy Jasmin a.k.a. DJ Josa
