= Call Me Mother (film) =

2025 comedy drama film by Jun Robles Lana

- Theatrical release poster
- Directed by: Jun Robles Lana
- Written by: Daisy G. Cayanan; Daniel S. Saniana; Jun Robles Lana
- Produced by: Daniel S. Saniana; Marjorie B. Lachica; Vincent Del Rosario III; Veronique Del Rosario-Corpus; Valerie S. Del Rosario
- Starring: Vice Ganda; Nadine Lustre
- Cinematography: Carlo C. Mendoza
- Edited by: Benjamin Tolentino
- Music by: Teresa Barrozo
- Production companies: ABS-CBN Studios; Star Cinema; The IdeaFirst Company; Viva Films
- Distributed by: ABS-CBN Film Productions
- Release dates: December 25, 2025 (MMFF); January 9, 2026 (United States, Canada, Guam, Cambodia)
- Running time: 120 minutes
- Country: Philippines
- Languages: Filipino; English
- Box office: ₱392 million

Call Me Mother is a 2025 Philippine comedy drama film directed by Jun Robles Lana from a story and screenplay he co-wrote with Daisy G. Cayanan and Daniel S. Saniana (who also served as co-producer). Starring Vice Ganda and Nadine Lustre, the film follows a queer single mother who plans to legally adopt her foster son, but the process becomes complicated when the boy's biological mother unexpectedly shows up.

A co-production between ABS-CBN Film Productions, ABS-CBN Studios, The IdeaFirst Company, and Viva Films, the film premiered at the 51st Metro Manila Film Festival on December 25, 2025. It marks Vice and Lustre's third film together since they last co-starred in the 2010 film Petrang Kabayo and in the 2015 film Beauty and the Bestie. The film received positive feedback from audience and critics and earned ₱392 million pesos nationwide, becoming the highest grossing Philippine film of 2025.

== Plot ==
Twinkle is a renowned pageant coach known nicknamed Mother Twinkle. At the Miss UniWorld pageant, one of her talents, Mara de Jesus, suddenly collapses. While recuperating, she reveals that to her team that she is pregnant. Pressured by her own mother, Mara gives up her baby to Twinkle's mother in order to protect her career. Shortly afterwards, Twinkle's mother dies, leaving Twinkle as the legal guardian of the baby, who is subsequently named Angelo. Twinkle eventually leaves pageantry to support Angelo and takes on several jobs while renting out her house to bedspacers.

Ten years later, Twinkle's friends inform her of a job opening at Hong Kong Disneyland and encourage her to legally adopt Angelo so she can bring him abroad. During the adoption process, a social worker, Mutya, tells Twinkle she must secure consent from Angelo's biological mother, who Twinkle reveals to be Mara, now a successful model engaged to Anton, the son of a wealthy tycoon. Twinkle then visits Mara to request her approval. Mara agrees—on the condition that Twinkle coach her for the upcoming Miss UniWorld pageant, her comeback after age restrictions were lifted. Twinkle accepts, but fears Angelo might grow closer to Mara. As Mara undergoes intensive training, she rescues Angelo from a thief who stole his tablet. This sparks a bond between Mara and Angelo, with Twinkle's household cheering their growing closeness. Twinkle feels torn, competing with Mara for Angelo's affection. Despite tensions, Mara eventually signs the consent form, marking a milestone in the adoption process. On Angelo's birthday, Twinkle plans to surprise him with a red bicycle she has been saving for, only to discover it has already been purchased. She settles for a red helmet, disappointing Angelo. Mara, unaware of Twinkle's efforts, gifts Angelo the coveted bicycle, igniting conflict between the two women.

At the Miss UniWorld coronation night, a jealous Twinkle forbids her household from watching the broadcast, but Angelo insists on supporting Mara. On stage, Mara reaches the final three and bravely answers a question from ten years ago. She reveals she is Angelo's mother, admitting she abandoned him but acknowledging Twinkle as the one who truly fulfilled the role of a mother. Twinkle, upset, turns off the television, while Angelo reels from the revelation. Eventually, he reconciles with Twinkle, assuring him she remains his parent, though he resents her for hiding the truth. Twinkle admits she was afraid of losing him.

As Angelo prepares his written consent, Mutya informs Twinkle that Mara has revoked her signature, jeopardizing the petition. Panicked, Twinkle threatens to flee with Angelo, prompting Mutya to call in tanods to take temporary custody of Angelo. In the chaos, Angelo falls on the stairs and is knocked unconscious. At the hospital, Twinkle and Mara argue over who is Angelo's rightful mother until a doctor warns that Angelo needs a blood transfusion. Mara volunteers, having the matching blood type. The incident forces Twinkle to reflect, with her confidante, Mama M advising her to accept Mara's role as Angelo's biological mother. Twinkle halts the adoption process and reconciles with Mara. After Angelo recovers, he is given to Anton and Mara amid protests from the child.

Twinkle departs for Hong Kong to begin her new job at Disneyland. Later, Mara and Angelo visit Twinkle, who now trains staff and performers at Disneyland, and spend a joyful day together, bridging the distance between them. Twinkle reflects that motherhood is comes from the heart and is a bond that endures.

== Cast ==
=== Main cast ===
- Vice Ganda as Twinkelito "Twinkle" Paoros Reyes: A queer mother and a beauty pageant coach who is in the process of adopting Angelo as her son. The actor reflecting on his role remarked that being motherhood is "beyond gender" and "beyond bearing a child and giving birth to a child".
- Nadine Lustre as Mara de Jesus: The biological mother of Angelo and Mila's daughter. Lustre's character is a beauty queen who became a high-fashion model. She underwent pageant training in preparation for the role. Lustre did not hesitate in accepting to be in the film upon learning she will work with Vice Ganda despite not knowing the nature of her role.

=== Supporting cast ===
- Lucas Andalio as Angelo "Angel" de Jesus: Twinkle de Guzman's adoptive son and Mara's biological son
- Brent Manalo as Marco de Guzman: Twinkle's younger brother and Angelo's adoptive uncle
- Mika Salamanca as Bea Santos: A next-door neighbor who was a medical tax student of Twinkle's neighbor and Marco's love interest
- Klarisse de Guzman as Mayet de Guzman: Twinkle's younger sister and Angelo's adoptive aunt
- River Joseph as Anton Villaverde: Mara's fiancé
- Shuvee Etrata as Ria de Guzman: Twinkle's youngest sister and Angelo's adoptive aunt
- Esnyr as Vince de Guzman: Twinkle's foster daughter and Angelo's adoptive sister
- MC Muah as Dorothy: Twinkle's close friend
- Iyah Mina as Diosdado "Ms. J" Patumbong: Mara's personal bodyguard and assistant
- Divine Tetay as Pageant Coach of 'Gandang Ina'
- Tanya Gomez as Mara de Jesus's Lawyer
- John Lapus as Mama M de Guzman: Twinkle's foster mother

=== Special participation ===
- Carmi Martin as Mila de Jesus: Mara's mother and Angel's biological grandmother
- Jennifer Sevilla as Nanette Villaverde: Anton's mother
- Robert Ortega as Tony Villaverde: Anton's father
- Chanda Romero as Mutya Sidro: The social worker
- Ces Quesada as Ms. Reyes: Twinkle's mother and Angel's adoptive grandmother

=== Guest appearances ===
- Mary Jean Lastimosa as herself/Miss Uniworld candidate
- Chelsea Manalo as herself/Miss Uniworld candidate
- Nicole Cordoves as herself/Miss Uniworld candidate
- Rafael Rosell as himself/Miss Uniworld Philippines presenter

== Production ==
Call Me Mother was directed by Jun Robles Lana and is a co-production between ABS-CBN Studios, ABS-CBN Film Productions, The IdeaFirst Company, and Viva Communications. Principal photography for Call Me Mother began on September 3.

=== Filming ===
Principal photography for Call Me Mother mostly took place within Metro Manila, with key scenes shot inside the Disneyland theme park in Hong Kong. It also became the first Asian film and third film globally to be shot with permission inside the theme park. This was made possible through executive producer Perci Intalan's connections with The Walt Disney Company.

=== Post-production ===
With a more grounded comedy intended for the film, director Lana and editor Ben Tolentino deleted scenes deemed too absurd, such as a parkour by Vice Ganda's character, a "Squid Game pageant training" for Nadine Lustre's role, and a "samurai confrontation" from the released version of the film.

== Release ==
Call Me Mother was theatrically released in the Philippines on December 25, 2025, as one of the official entries to the 51st Metro Manila Film Festival. The film is set to have its first international release on January 9, 2026 in select cinemas in United States, Canada, Guam, and Cambodia.

== Reception ==
=== Box office ===
On December 26, 2025, cinemas in Metro Manila revealed that Call Me Mother is leading at the box office, followed by Shake, Rattle & Roll Evil Origins, Unmarry, and Love You So Bad. On January 1, 2026, the film was reportedly still leading the box office, grossing ₱186.3 million, followed by Shake, Rattle & Roll: Evil Origins with ₱66.5 million. Later that month, the film had earned ₱300 million.

=== Critical response ===
Jemuel Tandoc, writing for ABS-CBN Entertainment's Push Team, praised the cast's performances, particularly those of Viceral, who gave "warmth and depth to Twinkle", Lustre, who continued to showcase "her natural acting prowess", and Andalio, who portrayed his character "with remarkable heart and sincerity". The technical aspects, including the screenplay, emotional weight, and cinematography, were also praised as well.

Mark Angelo Ching, writing for Philippine Entertainment Portal, described the film as the "departure" from the usual formula used in most of Viceral's films.

=== Accolades ===
Accolades received by Call Me Mother
Award	Year	Category	Recipient(s)	Result	Ref.
Asian Academy Creative Awards	2026	Best Actor in a Leading Role — Regional (Philippines)	Vice Ganda	Won	
ContentAsia Awards	2026	Best Feature Film or Telemovie Made in Asia	Call Me Mother	Silver	
Metro Manila Film Festival	2025	Best Picture	Call Me Mother	3rd (Note: Tied with Manila's Finest.)	
Metro Manila Film Festival	2025	Best Actor	Vice Ganda	Won	
Metro Manila Film Festival	2025	Best Actress	Nadine Lustre	Nominated	
Metro Manila Film Festival	2025	Best Child Performer	Lucas Andalio	Won	
Metro Manila Film Festival	2025	Best Screenplay	Jun Robles Lana (co-written with Daniel Saniana and Daisy Cayanan)	Nominated	
Metro Manila Film Festival	2025	Best Cinematography	Carlo Canlas Mendoza	Nominated	
Metro Manila Film Festival	2025	Best Production Design	Jaylo Conanan	Nominated	
Metro Manila Film Festival	2025	Best Editing	Benjamin Tolentino	Nominated	
Metro Manila Film Festival	2025	Best Musical Score	Teresa Barrozo	Nominated	
Metro Manila Film Festival	2025	Best Gender-Sensitive Film	Call Me Mother	Won	
Metro Manila Film Festival	2025	Best Float	Call Me Mother	Nominated	
The EDDYS	2026	Box Office Heroes Award	Vice Ganda	Won	
The EDDYS	2026	Best Actor	Vice Ganda	Nominated	
The EDDYS	2026	Best Supporting Actor	Lucas Andalio	Nominated	
The EDDYS	2026	Best Movie Theme Song	"Tala" by Emmanuel Sambayan, Nica Del Rosario, and Bryan Chong	Nominated	
