= Love You So Bad =

2025 romance film by Mae Cruz-Alviar

- Theatrical release poster
- Directed by: Mae Cruz-Alviar
- Screenplay by: Crystal Hazel S. San Miguel
- Story by: Maren Kyle R. Loreño; Crystal Hazel S. San Miguel; Vanessa R. Valdez; Mae Cruz-Alviar
- Produced by: Vanessa R. Valdez
- Starring: Will Ashley; Bianca de Vera; Dustin Yu
- Cinematography: Zach Sycip
- Edited by: Marya Ignacio
- Music by: Francis Concio
- Production companies: Star Cinema; ABS-CBN Studios; GMA Pictures; Regal Entertainment
- Distributed by: ABS-CBN Film Productions
- Release date: December 25, 2025
- Running time: 112 minutes
- Country: Philippines
- Language: Filipino
- Box office: ₱22 million

Love You So Bad is a 2025 Philippine romance film directed by Mae Cruz-Alviar from a story concept she co-wrote with Maren Kyle R. Loreño, Vanessa R. Valdez (who also served as producer), and Crystal Hazel S. San Miguel, who solely wrote the screenplay. Featuring an entirely new set of characters and storyline that are inspired by the 1998 film Dahil Mahal Na Mahal Kita, the film stars Will Ashley, Bianca de Vera, and Dustin Yu.

A co-production between ABS-CBN Film Productions, GMA Pictures, and Regal Entertainment, the film, an official entry to the 51st Metro Manila Film Festival, was released theatrically on December 25, 2025. It was later released through Netflix on July 16, 2026.

== Plot ==
Vanna, a college girl abandoned by her mother Mary, is an infamous partygirl who has had a series of boyfriends. At one gig, she is rescued from a sexual assault by LA, an illegitimate son who is also a varsity swimmer. The two bond over their shared low points and become a couple, but their relationship sours when LA's mother, Jen, is found to be dying of cancer. A despondent LA drowns his sorrows in alcohol and neglects Vanna, leading to her getting injured when LA causes a vehicular accident while drunk. An angry Mary orders LA to leave Vanna, but LA is unable to tell Vanna directly and avoids her.

Two weeks later, a drunk Vanna collapses at a bar and is rescued by the student council president, Vic, who carries her to her residence before passing out beside her from exhaustion as Vanna mumbles her feelings for him. The next day, the two panic upon seeing each other, as Vic denies doing anything to a now-sober Vanna. Vic, who is also the leader of their thesis group, drives Vanna to school, but when Vanna tries to retrieve her lipstick at the floor of Vic's car, she is videotaped by onlookers who think she is giving Vic a blowjob, enraging LA. In revenge, LA cheats on another girl, Trish, who insults Vanna's aunt, Eve, for being a flirt. An angry Vanna confronts both and slaps LA, who claims no one can love Vanna after her scandal. Vic suddenly steps in and declares Vanna to be his girlfriend before leading her away. Vic tells Savannah that she deserves a better person, prompting Vanna to join in Vic's charade to humiliate LA.

For their preceding misbehavior, Vanna, LA, and Trish, are ordered to do library service as punishment, with Vic volunteering to keep Vanna company. The two act like a real couple and succeed in making LA jealous, while Savannah gradually shapes up under Vic's influence. LA asks Vanna at a school event if she really loves Vic, but Vic steps in again as Vanna affirms, prompting a despondent LA to entrust Vanna to Vic.

Vic, Vanna and their thesis group go to Vic's cacao farm in South Cotabato as part of their project. Vic and Vanna become a real couple after she catches Vic confessing to his grandfather that he has feelings for Vanna since he first met her. However, Vic's domineering mother, Mich, arrives and bluntly states her disapproval of their relationship. Seeking to impress Mich, a drunk Vanna harvests cacao pods at night, only to be berated by Mich when she unwittingly picks unripe pods. The next day, Vanna overhears Vic acquiescing to Mich's demand to expel her, prompting her to storm off. Vanna is met on the road by LA, who flew in after seeing Mich berating her on a livestream. LA apologizes for mistreating her and confesses that Mary ordered her to break up, but Vanna is further angered over his abandonment and being reminded of her mother. Vic arrives and tries to reason with Vanna, but instead gets into a fracas with LA, as Savannah berates the two for treating her as a toy and scolds Vic for loving only a compartmentalized version of herself and failing to stand up for her earlier.

Returning to their homes, Vic stands up to his mother for repressing him, while LA reproaches his stepfather for venting out his anger over Jen's bigamy on him. After Vanna spirals into depression, Eve calls in Mary, to whom Vanna reveals that her torrid relationships were the result of her making up for Mary's abandonment. Mary apologizes and comforts her daughter by urging her to face life's challenges.

Years later, a now-successful Vanna publishes her memoir and is asked whom she chose between Vic and LA. In a flashback, Vanna returns to South Cotabato and tells both men that she is choosing herself instead, while thanking LA for loving her at her low points and Vic for loving her for what she can achieve.

== Cast ==
=== Main cast ===
- Will Ashley as Victor "Vic" Alvarez: An academic achiever and student council president.
- Bianca de Vera as Savannah "Vanna" Aquino: A self-proclaimed lover girl with bold personality.
- Dustin Yu as Laurence Adrian "LA" Dolores: A campus athlete whose hobby is swimming.

=== Supporting cast ===
- Dimples Romana as Tita Eve
- Agot Isidro as Mary
- Ana Abad-Santos as Mich
- Bodjie Pascua as Lolo Fred
- Desiree del Valle as Jen
- Victor Neri as Renz
- Bernard Palanca as Paco
- Xyriel Manabat as Belai
- Ralph de Leon as Phil
- Vince Maristela as Jed
- Zach Castañeda as Dylan
- Reign Parani as Trisha
- Nour Hooshmand as Nini
- Franco Laurel as OSA Head
- Victor Silayan as Coach
- Lotlot Bustamante as Manimbe
- Ron Angeles as Bry
- Argus Aspiras as Ritchie

=== Special Participation ===
- Anne Curtis as Older Savannah

== Production ==
The details of the new film project were announced in August 2025. Principal photography for the film was commenced on September 25.

On October 10, the film, along with Bar Boys: After School (which also starred Ashley), I'mPerfect, and Unmarry, was chosen as the "final four" entries at the 51st Metro Manila Film Festival.

== Reception ==
Love You So Bad received generally favorable reviews from critics, with praise directed toward the performances of Will Ashley and Bianca de Vera, while opinions on its screenplay, pacing, and use of romantic comedy conventions were mixed.

Ralph Revelar Sarza of ABS-CBN Entertainment criticized the film's uneven narrative and rushed pacing, although he suggested that its "messiness" may have been intentional. He highlighted the film's attempt to move away from expectations that mainstream love-team romances remain "decent" or wholesome. Sarza praised Ashley's performance, writing that he served as the film's "anchor" despite its uneven narrative.

Writing for ClickTheCity, Wanggo Gallaga praised Mae Cruz-Alviar's energetic direction and the performances of the lead cast, particularly Ashley and de Vera, although he found some subplots underdeveloped. While agreeing with the film's message, Gallaga wished it had concluded with a more conventional romantic-comedy ending.

Philbert Dy of Spot gave the film a negative review, criticizing its dialogue and its handling of the central conflicts, arguing that the material did not effectively serve its young cast.

Brontë H. Lacsamana of BusinessWorld commended the performances of the lead actors, particularly De Vera, but criticized the film's reliance on fan-service clichés.

Mark Angelo Ching of PEP praised Cruz-Alviar's direction for balancing the film's multiple storylines and Zach Sycip's cinematography. He noted that the supporting cast felt underutilized while praising the performances of the three leads, concluding that their performances made the film "more than just fan service."

=== Accolades ===
Accolades received by Love You So Bad
Award ceremony	Date	Category	Recipient(s)	Result	Ref.
2025 Metro Manila Film Festival	December 27, 2025	Best Actor	Will Ashley	Nominated	
2025 Metro Manila Film Festival	December 27, 2025	Best Actress	Bianca de Vera	Nominated	
2025 Metro Manila Film Festival	December 27, 2025	Best Cinematography	Zach Sycip	Nominated	
2025 Metro Manila Film Festival	December 27, 2025	Best Production Design	Maolen Fadul	Nominated	
2025 Metro Manila Film Festival	December 27, 2025	Best Editing	Marya Ignacio	Nominated	
2025 Metro Manila Film Festival	December 27, 2025	Best Sound	Mike Idioma, Bien Sparks, Denise Simone, Michael Docena	Nominated	
2025 Metro Manila Film Festival	December 27, 2025	Best Musical Score	Francis Concio	Nominated	
2025 Metro Manila Film Festival	December 27, 2025	Best Child Performer	Argus Aspiras	Nominated	
2025 Metro Manila Film Festival	December 27, 2025	Best Float	Love You So Bad	Nominated	
2025 Metro Manila Film Festival	December 27, 2025	Male Star of the Night	Will Ashley	Won	
2025 Metro Manila Film Festival	December 27, 2025	Male Star of the Night	Dustin Yu	Won	
2025 Metro Manila Film Festival	December 27, 2025	Female Star of the Night	Bianca de Vera	Won	
VP Choice Awards	April 29, 2026	Movie Actor of the Year	Will Ashley	Nominated	
Gawad PASADO	October 22, 2026	PinakaPASADOng Aktor	Will Ashley	Nominated	
PMPC Star Awards for Movies	October 25, 2026	Movie Loveteam of the Year	Dustin Yu and Bianca de Vera	Nominated	
