= Metro Manila Film Festival Award for Best Sound Engineering =

Award presented annually by the Metropolitan Manila Development Authority (MMDA)

Metro Manila Film Festival Award for Best Sound Engineer
- Awarded for: Finest or most aesthetic sound editing or sound design
- Country: Philippines
- Presented by: MMDA
- First award: 1975
- Currently held by: Roy Santos Manila's Finest (2025)
- Website: www.mmda.gov.ph/mmff/

The Metro Manila Film Festival Award for Best Sound Engineer is an award presented annually by the Metropolitan Manila Development Authority (MMDA). It was first awarded at the 1st Metro Manila Film Festival ceremony, held in 1975; Diligin mo ng Hamog ang Uhaw na Lupa film received the award and it grants to a film exhibiting the finest or most aesthetic sound editing or sound design. Currently, nominees and winners are determined by Executive Committees, headed by the Metropolitan Manila Development Authority Chairman and key members of the film industry.

== Winners and nominees ==
=== 1970s ===
Year	Film	Sound Designer(s)	Ref
1975 (1st)	Diligin mo ng Hamog ang Uhaw na Lupa		
1976 (2nd)	None (Note: No one received the "Best Sound Engineer" category.)		
1977 (3rd)	None		
1978 (4th)	None		
1979 (5th)	Kadete	Gaudencio Barredo	

=== 1980s ===
Year	Film	Sound Designer(s)	Ref
1980 (6th)	Kung Ako'y Iiwan Mo	Rudy Baldovino and Ben Pelayo	
1981 (7th)	Kisapmata	Ramon Reyes	
1982 (8th)	Himala	Rolly Ruta	
1983 (9th)	Karnal	Rudy Baldovino	
1984 (10th)	None		
1985 (11th)	Ano ang Kulay ng Mukha ng Diyos?	Rolly Ruta	
1986 (12th)	Halimaw sa Banga	Rodel Capule	
1987 (13th)	Olongapo, The Great American Dream	Juanito Clemente	
1988 (14th)	Itanong Mo sa Buwan		
1989 (15th)	Ang Bukas ay Akin	Albert Rima	

=== 1990s ===
Year	Film	Sound Designer(s)	Ref
1990 (16th)	Andrea, Paano Ba ang Maging Isang Ina?	Rolly Ruta (Best Studio Sound Recording)	
1990 (16th)	Ama Bakit Mo Ako Pinabayaan?	Conrado Radoban (Best Field Sound Recording)	
1991 (17th)	Juan Tamad at Mister Shooli sa Mongolian Barbeque	Gaudencio Barredo	
1992 (18th)	Andres Manambit: Angkan ng Matatapang	Rolly Ruta	
1993 (19th)	May Minanahal	Ramon Reyes	
1994 (20th)	Lucas Abelardo	Rolly Ruta	
1995 (21st)	-	-	
1996 (22nd)	Magic Temple	Michael Idioma and Ronald de Asis	
1997 (23rd)	Nasaan ang Puso?	Albert Idioma, Ronaldo Asis and Arnold Reodica	
1998 (24th)	José Rizal	Albert Michael Idioma	
1999 (25th)	Muro-ami	Albert Michael Idioma	

=== 2000s ===
Year	Film	Sound Designer(s)	Ref
2000 (26th)	Deathrow	Albert Michael Idioma and Rudy Gonzales	
2001 (27th)	Yamashita: The Tiger's Treasure	Albert Michael Idioma	
2002 (28th)	Hula Mo...Huli Ko	Nestor Mutya	
2003 (29th)	Malikmata	Mike Idioma	
2004 (30th)	Sigaw	Albert Michael Idioma and Arnold Reodica	
2005 (31st)	Exodus: Tales from the Enchanted Kingdom	Ditoy Aguila	
2006 (32nd)	Mano Po 5: Gua Ai Di	Ditoy Aguila	
2007 (33rd)	Resiklo	Ditoy Aguila	
2008 (34th)	Dayo: Sa Mundo ng Elementalia	Albert Idioma and Whannie Dellosa	
2009 (35th)	Ang Darling Kong Aswang	Mike Idioma	

=== 2010s ===
Year	Film	Sound Designer(s)	Ref
2010 (36th)	Super Inday and the Golden Bibe; RPG Metanoia	Ditoy Aguila; Ambient Media	
2011 (37th)	Manila Kingpin: The Asiong Salonga Story	Mike Idioma	
2012 (38th)	El Presidente	Albert Michael Idioma	
2013 (39th)	10,000 Hours	Emmanuel Clemente	
2014 (40th)	Bonifacio: Ang Unang Pangulo	Wild Sound	
2015 (41st)	Nilalang	Ditoy Aguila	
2016 (42nd)	Seklusyon	Lamberto Casas Jr. and Albert Michael Idioma	
2017 (43rd)	Siargao	Mark Locsin, Mikko Quizon, Jason Conanan and Kat Salinas	
2017 (43rd)	Ang Larawan	Hit Productions	
2017 (43rd)	Ang Panday	Albert Michael Idioma	
2018 (44th)	Aurora	Albert Michael Idioma	
2018 (44th)	One Great Love	Lamberto Casas, Jr.	
2018 (44th)	Rainbow's Sunset	Albert Michael Idioma and Alex Tomboc	
2019 (45th)	Mindanao	Hiroyuki Ishizaka	
2019 (45th)	Write About Love	Emmanuel Verona	
2019 (45th)	Sunod	Mark Locsin, John Michael Perez, Mikko Quizon, and Wapak Studio	

=== 2020s ===
Year	Film	Sound Designer(s)	Ref
2020 (46th)	Fan Girl	Vincent Villa	
2020 (46th)	Tagpuan	Albert Michael Idioma	
2020 (46th)	Magikland	Albert Michael Idioma and Alex Tomboc	
2020 (46th)	The Boy Foretold by the Stars	Pietro Marco Javier, Jannina Mikaela Minglanilla	
2020 (46th)	The Missing	Fatima Nerrika Salim and Emmanuel Verona	
2021 (47th)	A Hard Day	Albert Michael Idioma	
2021 (47th)	Big Night!	Emmanuel Verona	
2021 (47th)	Kun Maupay Man it Panahon	Roman Dymny	
2022 (48th)	Deleter	Aian Louie Caro, Armand de Guzman, and Russel Gabayeron	
2022 (48th)	Mamasapano: Now It Can Be Told	Armand de Guzman and Aizen Andrade	
2022 (48th)	Nanahimik ang Gabi	Andrea Teresa Idioma	
2022 (48th)	Partners in Crime	Emilio Bien Sparks	
2023 (49th)	GomBurZa	Melvin Rivera and Louie Boy Bauson	
2023 (49th)	Becky & Badette	Armand de Guzman	
2023 (49th)	Family of Two	Aian Louie Caro	
2023 (49th)	Kampon	Albert Michael Idioma and Jannina Mikaela Minglanilla	
2023 (49th)	Mallari	Immanuel Verona and Nerrina Salim	
2024 (50th)	Strange Frequencies: Taiwan Killer Hospital	Ditoy Aguila	
2024 (50th)	Espantaho	Alex Tomboc and Lamberto Casas Jr.	
2024 (50th)	Green Bones	Albert Michael Idioma and Nicole Rosacay	
2024 (50th)	Isang Himala	Albert Michael Idioma and Emilio Bien Sparks	
2024 (50th)	Topakk	Albert Michael M. Idioma, Janina Mikaela Minglanilla, Andrea Teresa T. Idioma, Jhon Eric Mancera, Donald Ilagan, Gerald Guardiano, Merlvin Rivera	
2025 (51st)	Manila's Finest	Roy Santos	
2025 (51st)	I'mPerfect	Mark Locsin	
2025 (51st)	Love You So Bad	Mike Idioma, Bien Sparks, Denise Simone and Michael Docena	
2025 (51st)	Shake, Rattle & Roll Evil Origins	Ditoy Aguila	
2025 (51st)	Unmarry	Lamberto Casas Jr. and Alex Tomboc	
