= 2025 Metro Manila Film Festival =

51st edition of annual Philippine festival

2025 Metro Manila Film Festival 51st Metro Manila Film Festival
- No. of films: 8
- Festival date: December 25, 2025 to January 14, 2026

MMFF chronology
- 52nd ed. 50th ed.

The 2025 Metro Manila Film Festival was the 51st edition of the annual Metro Manila Film Festival which started on December 25, 2025, and ended on January 14, 2026. During the festival, no foreign films are shown in Philippine theaters (excluding IMAX, 4DX, and ScreenX).

== Entries ==
=== Feature films ===
The first four official entries were announced on July 8, 2025, at the Glorietta in Makati, selected from 23 scripts submitted by production companies. This marks the first time that Makati is the designated host city of the MMFF which has the theme "A New Era for Philippine Cinema".

The next four entries was announced on October 10, 2025 at the University of Makati Performing Arts Theater. They were feature films which were submitted as finished works on or before September 30, 2025. The original deadline was September 15, 2025, but was later extended. The committee selected four finished films among more than twenty entries.

The MMFF selection committee is headed by Boots Anson-Rodrigo. The entries were selected based on the following criteria: artistic excellence, commercial appeal, Filipino cultural sensibility, and global appeal.

Most of the entries were given the Parental Guidance rating by the Movie and Television Review and Classification Board; I'mPerfect was deemed suitable for a general audience, while Shake, Rattle & Roll: Evil Origins received an R-13 rating.

Title	Starring	Production company	Director	Genre	Ref.
First batch
Call Me Mother	Vice Ganda, Nadine Lustre	Star Cinema, The IdeaFirst Company, Viva Films	Jun Robles Lana	Comedy drama	
Manila's Finest	Piolo Pascual, Rica Peralejo, Enrique Gil, Ashtine Olviga	Cignal TV, Inc., MQuest Ventures	Raymond Red	Period crime-thriller	
Rekonek	Gerald Anderson, Gloria Diaz, Carmina Villarroel, Zoren Legaspi, Alexa Miro	Reality MM Studios	Jade Castro	Family drama	
Shake, Rattle & Roll: Evil Origins	1775: Carla Abellana, Janice de Belen, Loisa Andalio	Regal Entertainment	1775: Shugo Praico	Horror, Supernatural, Anthology	
Shake, Rattle & Roll: Evil Origins	2025: Francine Diaz, Seth Fedelin, Fyang Smith, JM Ibarra	Regal Entertainment	2025: Joey de Guzman	Horror, Supernatural, Anthology	
Shake, Rattle & Roll: Evil Origins	2050: Richard Gutierrez, Ivana Alawi, Manilyn Reynes, Dustin Yu	Regal Entertainment	2050: Ian Loreños	Horror, Supernatural, Anthology	
Second batch
Bar Boys: After School	Carlo Aquino, Rocco Nacino, Enzo Pineda, Kean Cipriano	901 Studios	Kip Oebanda	Drama	
I'mPerfect	Krystel Go, Earl Amaba	Nathan Studios	Sigrid Andrea Bernardo	Social romance	
Love You So Bad	Bianca de Vera, Will Ashley, Dustin Yu	Star Cinema, GMA Pictures, Regal Entertainment	Mae Cruz-Alviar	Romance	
Unmarry	Angelica Panganiban, Zanjoe Marudo	Quantum Films, Cineko Productions	Jeffrey Jeturian	Drama	

== Parade of Stars ==
Makati hosted the customary Parade of the Stars float motorcade for the first time in MMFF history. It was held on December 19, 2025, with the parade starting from the World Trade Center Manila in Pasay and ended in Circuit Makati. The route is 8.4 kilometers (5.2 mi) long. The event culminated with a musical festival.

== Awards ==
2025 Metro Manila Film Festival Gabi ng Parangal
- Date: December 27, 2025
- Site: Dusit Thani Manila, Makati
- Hosted by: Enchong Dee, KaladKaren, Michael Sager

Highlights
- Best Picture: I'mPerfect
- Best Director: Jeffrey Jeturian; Unmarry
- Best Actor: Vice Ganda; Call Me Mother
- Best Actress: Krystel Go; I'mPerfect
- Most awards: Manila's Finest (8)
- Most nominations: Manila's Finest (14)

Television coverage
- Network: TV5

The Gabi ng Parangal (transl. Awards Night) of the 2025 Metro Manila Film Festival was held on December 27, 2025, at the Dusit Thani Manila in Makati and was streamed live on TV5's Facebook page and had a delayed broadcast in its terrestrial channel. Enchong Dee, KaladKaren, and Michael Sager served as hosts of the event.

Manila's Finest garnered the most awards. Vice Ganda became the first openly-queer individual to win the Best Actor award while Krystel Go became the first person with Down syndrome to win the Best Actress award.

Best Picture	Best Director
I'mPerfect – Nathan Studios‡; Unmarry – Quantum Films, Cineko Films (2nd Best Picture); Call Me Mother – ABS-CBN Studios, The IdeaFirst Company, Viva Films and Manila's Finest – Cignal TV, MQuest Ventures (tie) (3rd Best Picture)	Jeffrey Jeturian – Unmarry‡; Kip Oebanda – Bar Boys: After School; Jun Lana – Call Me Mother; Sigrid Andrea Bernardo – I'mPerfect; Raymond Red – Manila's Finest
Best Actor	Best Actress
Vice Ganda – Call Me Mother‡; Carlo Aquino – Bar Boys: After School; Earl Amaba – I'mPerfect; Will Ashley – Love You So Bad; Piolo Pascual – Manila's Finest; Zanjoe Marudo – Unmarry	Krystel Go – I'mPerfect‡; Nadine Lustre – Call Me Mother; Bianca de Vera – Love You So Bad; Angelica Panganiban – Unmarry
Best Supporting Actor	Best Supporting Actress
Tom Rodriguez – Unmarry‡; Will Ashley – Bar Boys: After School; Joey Marquez – I'mPerfect; Zaijian Jaranilla – I'mPerfect; Cedrick Juan – Manila's Finest; Zack Sibug – Unmarry	Odette Khan – Bar Boys: After School‡; Janice de Belen – I'mPerfect; Sylvia Sanchez – I'mPerfect; Ashtine Olviga – Manila's Finest; Eugene Domingo – Unmarry; Solenn Heussaff – Unmarry
Best Screenplay	Best Cinematography
Chris Martinez and Therese Cayaba – Unmarry‡; Kip Oebanda, Carlo Catu and Zig Dulay – Bar Boys: After School; Jun Robles Lana, Daniel Saniana and Daisy Cayanan – Call Me Mother; Moira Lang, Sherad Anthony Sanchez and Michiko Yamamoto – Manila's Finest; Sigrid Andrea Bernardo – I'mPerfect	Raymond Red – Manila's Finest‡; Carlo Canlas Mendoza – Call Me Mother; Zach Sycip – Love You So Bad; Moises M. Zee, Mark Joshua Tirona and Rommel Andreo Sales – Shake, Rattle & Roll Evil Origins; Kara Moreno – Unmarry
Best Production Design	Best Editing
Digo Ricio – Manila's Finest‡; Jaylo Conanan – Call Me Mother; Maolen Fadul – Love You So Bad; Remton Zuasola – Rekonek; Leo Velasco Jr. – Shake, Rattle & Roll Evil Origins: 2050	Benjo Ferrer – Unmarry‡; Chuck Gutierrez – Bar Boys: After School; Benjamin Tolentino – Call Me Mother; Marya Ignacio – I'mPerfect; Marya Ignacio – Love You So Bad; Jay Halili and Noe Paguiligan – Manila's Finest
Best Sound	Best Original Theme Song
Roy Santos – Manila's Finest‡; Mark Locsin – I'mPerfect; Mike Idioma, Bien Sparks, Denise Simone and Michael Docena – Love You So Bad; Ditoy Aguila – Shake, Rattle & Roll Evil Origins; Lamberto Casas Jr. and Alex Tomboc – Unmarry	"Sandalan" from Manila's Finest – by Vehnee Saturno‡; "Bagong Simula" from Rekonek – by Sabine Cerrado; "Pahinga" from Rekonek – by Sabine Cerrado; "Patungo" from Rekonek – by Sabine Cerrado; "Balak sa Dilim" from Shake, Rattle & Roll Evil Origins – by Mikhail Ali Hooshmand; "Dugo" from Shake, Rattle & Roll Evil Origins – by Paulo Almaden
Best Musical Score	Best Visual Effects
Frederik Sandoval and Emerzon Texon – Manila's Finest‡; Teresa Barrozo – Call Me Mother; Francis Concio – Love You So Bad; Jose Buencamino, Mikhail Ali Hooshmand and Paulo Almaden – Shake, Rattle & Roll Evil Origins; Len Calvo – Unmarry	Santelmo Inc. – Shake, Rattle & Roll Evil Origins‡; John Kenneth Paclibar – Bar Boys: After School; Mylav Infante – I'mPerfect; Eoplus, Inc. – Manila's Finest; Reality MM Studios Post – Rekonek
Best Child Performer	Best Float
Lucas Andalio – Call Me Mother‡; Argus Aspiras – Love You So Bad; Ellie Cruz – Rekonek	Manila's Finest and Unmarry (tie)‡; Bar Boys: After School; Call Me Mother; I'mPerfect; Love You So Bad; Rekonek; Shake, Rattle & Roll Evil Origins
Fernando Poe Jr. Memorial Award for Excellence	Gatpuno Antonio J. Villegas Cultural Award
Bar Boys: After School‡	Manila's Finest‡
Gender Sensitivity Award
Call Me Mother‡; Bar Boys: After School; Unmarry

Other awards

- Male Star of the Night – Dustin Yu and Will Ashley
- Female Star of the Night – Bianca de Vera
- Special Jury Prize for Best Breakthrough Performance – Zack Sibug (Unmarry)
- Special Jury Prize for Best Ensemble – I'mPerfect

=== Multiple awards ===
Awards	Film
8	Manila's Finest
7	Unmarry
4	Call Me Mother
3	I'mPerfect
2	Bar Boys: After School

=== Multiple nominations ===
Awards	Film
14	Manila's Finest
12	Unmarry
11	Call Me Mother
10	I'mPerfect
9	Love You So Bad
9	Bar Boys: After School
7	Shake, Rattle & Roll Evil Origins
5	Rekonek

== Box office gross ==
According to Butch Francisco, a commentator on the entertainment industry, the combined box office of the festival's entries declined from the previous edition of the MMFF, with none of the eight films earning a profit. The decline was also noted by PEP, with Call Me Mother being cited as the highest-grossing entry of the festival at above ₱300 million. However, the festival's executive committee has refrained from releasing any box office figures per an agreement with the films' producers; as in previous editions of the MMFF, only the festival's organizers at the Metropolitan Manila Development Authority (MMDA) can issue official box office data. Noel Ferrer, a spokesperson for the MMFF, stated that seven out of the eight film entries "reach[ed] the eight-digit mark in gross receipts (some even surpassing it)", noting that the highest-grossing entry has since become the highest-grossing Filipino film of 2025.

Preceded by 2024 Metro Manila Film Festival	Metro Manila Film Festival; 2025	Succeeded by 2026 Metro Manila Film Festival
