= Metro Manila Film Festival Award for Best Musical Score =

Award presented annually by the Metropolitan Manila Development Authority (MMDA)

- Awarded for: Excellence in sound mixing or recording in a film
- Country: Philippines
- Presented by: MMDA
- First award: 1975
- Currently held by: Frederik Sandoval and Emerzon Texon, Manila's Finest (2025)
- Website: www.mmda.gov.ph/mmff/

The Metro Manila Film Festival Award for Best Musical Score is an award presented annually by the Metropolitan Manila Development Authority (MMDA). It was first awarded at the 1st Metro Manila Film Festival ceremony, held in 1975; George Canseco won the award for his musical score in Batu-Bato sa Langit and it recognizes the finest or most euphonic sound mixing or recording, and is generally awarded to the production sound mixers and re-recording mixers of the winning film. Currently, nominees and winners are determined by Executive Committees, headed by the Metropolitan Manila Development Authority Chairman and key members of the film industry.

== Winners and nominees ==
=== 1970s ===
Year	Film	Composer(s)	Ref
1975 (1st)	Batu-Bato sa Langit	George Canseco	
1976 (2nd)	Ganito Kami Noon, Paano Kayo Ngayon	Lutgardo Labad	
1977 (3rd)	None (Note: No "Best Musical Score" awarded.)		
1978 (4th)	None		
1979 (5th)	Ang Sisiw Ay Isang Agila	Restie Umali	

=== 1980s ===
Year	Film	Composer(s)	Ref
1980 (6th)	Ang Panday	Ernani Cuenco	
1981 (7th)	Kisapmata	Clodualdo del Mundo, Jr., Raquel Villavicencio, and Mike De Leon	
1982 (8th)	Ang Panday: Ikatlong Yugto	Ernani Cuenco	
1983 (9th)	Hot Property	William Yusi	
1984 (10th)	Shake, Rattle & Roll	Jaime Fabregas	
1985 (11th)	Ano ang kulay ng mukha ng Diyos?	Willy Cruz	
1986 (12th)	Halimaw sa Banga	Jaime Fabregas	
1987 (13th)	Anak Badjao	Marita Manuel	
1988 (14th)	Magkano Ang Iyong Dangal?	-	
1989 (15th)	Imortal	George Canseco	

=== 1990s ===
Year	Film	Composer(s)	Ref
1990 (16th)	Andrea, Paano Ba ang Maging Isang Ina?	Mon Faustino	
1991 (17th)	Ang Totoong Buhay ni Pacita M.	Danny Tan	
1992 (18th)	Bakit Labis Kitang Mahal	Dionisio Buencamino	
1993 (19th)	Kung Mawawala Ka Pa		
1994 (20th)	Kanto Boy: Anak ni Totoy Guwapo	Jaime Fabregas	
1995 (21st)	Muling Umawit ang Puso		
1996 (22nd)	Magic Temple	Archie Castillo	
1997 (23rd)	Nasaan ang Puso?	Jesse Lasaten	
1998 (24th)	José Rizal	Nonong Buencamino	
1999 (25th)	Muro-ami	Nonong Buencamino	

=== 2000s ===
Year	Film	Composer(s)	Ref
2000 (26th)	Tanging Yaman	Nonong Buencamino	
2001 (27th)	Bagong Buwan	Nonong Buencamino	
2002 (28th)	Mano Po	Von de Guzman	
2003 (29th)	Malikmata	Francis Guevarra and Ferdie Marquez	
2004 (30th)	Panaghoy sa Suba	Nonong Buencamino	
2005 (31st)	Kutob	Jaime Fabregas	
2006 (32nd)	Mano Po 5: Gua Ai Di	Von De Guzman	
2007 (33rd)	Bahay Kubo: A Pinoy Mano Po!	Von De Guzman	
2008 (34th)	Dayo: Sa Mundo ng Elementalia	Jessie Lasaten	
2009 (35th)	Mano Po 6: A Mother's Love	Von de Guzman	

=== 2010s ===
Year	Film	Composer(s)	Ref
2010 (36th)	Ang Tanging Ina Mo (Last na 'To!)	Jessie Lasaten	
2011 (37th)	Manila Kingpin: The Asiong Salonga Story	Jessie Lasaten	
2012 (38th)	El Presidente	Jessie Lasaten	
2013 (39th)	10,000 Hours	Teresa Barrozo	
2014 (40th)	Bonifacio: Ang Unang Pangulo	Von de Guzman	
2015 (41st)	Nilalang	Jessie Lasaten	
2015 (41st)	My Bebe Love: #KiligPaMore	Vincent de Jesus	
2015 (41st)	Honor Thy Father	Erwin Romulo	
2015 (41st)	Buy Now, Die Later	Jerrold Tarog	
2015 (41st)	#Walang Forever	Emerson Texon	
2016 (42nd)	Saving Sally	Pablo Pico	
2016 (42nd)	Seklusyon	Francis de Veyra	
2016 (42nd)	Vince & Kath & James		
2017 (43rd)	Ang Larawan	Ryan Cayabyab	
2017 (43rd)	Deadma Walking	Von de Guzman	
2017 (43rd)	Siargao	Robbie Factoran and Ricardo Jugo	
2018 (44th)	One Great Love	Miguel Mendoza	
2018 (44th)	Aurora	Oscar Fogelström	
2018 (44th)	Rainbow's Sunset	Emerzon Texon	
2019 (45th)	Write About Love	Jerold Tarog	
2019 (45th)	Mindanao	Teresa Barrozo	
2019 (45th)	Sunod	Bogs Jugo and Robbie Factoran	

=== 2020s ===
Year	Film	Composer(s)	Ref
2020 (46th)	Magikland	Emerzon Texon	
2020 (46th)	Fan Girl	Teresa Barrozo	
2020 (46th)	Suarez: The Healing Priest	Sherwin Castillo	
2020 (46th)	The Missing	Jessie Lasaten	
2020 (46th)	The Boy Foretold by the Stars	Paulo Protacio	
2021 (47th)	Big Night!	Teresa Barrozo	
2021 (47th)	A Hard Day	Peter Legaste and Raphael Catap	
2021 (47th)	Kun Maupay Man it Panahon	Andrew Florentino	
2022 (48th)	Nanahimik ang Gabi	Greg Rodriguez III	
2023 (49th)	Mallari	Von de Guzman	
2023 (49th)	Becky and Badette	Tessa Barrozo	
2023 (49th)	When I Met You In Tokyo	Jessie Lazaten	
2023 (49th)	Rewind	Francis Concio	
2023 (49th)	Firefly	Len Calvo	
2024 (50th)	Isang Himala	Vincent De Jesus	
2024 (50th)	Espantaho	Von De Guzman	
2024 (50th)	Green Bones	Len Calvo	
2024 (50th)	Strange Frequencies: Taiwan Killer Hospital	Decky Jazer Margaja	
2024 (50th)	The Kingdom	Jessie Lassaten	
2024 (50th)	Topakk	Jose Antonio Buencamino	
2025 (51st)	Manila's Finest	Frederik Sandoval and Emerzon Texon	
2025 (51st)	Call Me Mother	Teresa Barrozo	
2025 (51st)	Love You So Bad	Francis Concio	
2025 (51st)	Shake, Rattle & Roll Evil Origins	Jose Buencamino, Mikhail Ali Hooshmand and Paulo Almaden	
2025 (51st)	Unmarry	Len Calvo	
