= Metro Manila Film Festival Award for Best Editing =

Annual Philippine film award

- Awarded for: Finest or most aesthetic film editing
- Country: Philippines
- Presented by: MMDA
- First award: 1975
- Currently held by: Benjo Ferrer, Unmarry (2025)
- Website: www.mmda.gov.ph/mmff/

The Metro Manila Film Festival Award for Best Editing is an award presented annually by the Metropolitan Manila Development Authority (MMDA). It was first awarded at the 1st Metro Manila Film Festival ceremony, held in 1975; Edgardo Vinarao won the award for his editing in Diligin mo ng Hamog ang Uhaw na Lupa and it grants to a film exhibiting the finest editing for work in a motion picture. Currently, nominees and winners are determined by Executive Committees, headed by the Metropolitan Manila Development Authority Chairman and key members of the film industry.

== Winners and nominees ==
=== 1970s ===
Year	Film	Editor(s)	Ref
1975 (1st)	Diligin mo ng Hamog ang Uhaw na Lupa	Edgardo Vinarao	
1976 (2nd)	Minsa'y Isang Gamu-Gamo	Edgardo Vinarao	
1977 (3rd)	None (Note: No "Best Editing" awarded.)		
1978 (4th)	Rubia Servios	Jose Tarnate	
1979 (5th)	Kadete	Edgardo Vinarao	

=== 1980s ===
Year	Film	Editor(s)	Ref
1980 (6th)	-	-	
1981 (7th)	Pagbabalik ng Panday	Ver Reyes	
1982 (8th)	Himala	Ike Jarlego Jr. and Ben Pelayo	
1983 (9th)	Bago Kumalat ang Kamandag	Augusto Salvador	
1984 (10th)	Shake, Rattle & Roll	Jess Navarro	
1985 (11th)	Paradise Inn	Edgardo Vinarao	
1986 (12th)	Halimaw sa Banga	Efren Jarlego	
1987 (13th)	The Untold Story of Melanie Marquez	Rogelio Salvador	
1988 (14th)	Magkano Ang Iyong Dangal?	-	
1989 (15th)	Imortal	Ike Jarlego Jr.	

=== 1990s ===
Year	Film	Editor(s)	Ref
1990 (16th)	Andrea, Paano Ba ang Maging Isang Ina?	Boy Vinarao	
1991 (17th)	Ang Totoong Buhay ni Pacita M.	George Jarlego	
1992 (18th)	Andres Manambit: Angkan ng Matatapang	Ike Jarlego Jr.	
1993 (19th)	Doring Dorobo: Hagupit ng Batas	Augusto Salvador	
1994 (20th)	Lucas Abelardo	Renato de Leon	
1995 (21st)	-	-	
1996 (22nd)	Magic Temple	Danilo Gloria	
1997 (23rd)	Nasaan ang Puso?	Jaime Davila	
1998 (24th)	José Rizal	Jess Navarro and Manet Dayrit	
1999 (25th)	Muro-ami	Jess Navarro and Manet Dayrit	

=== 2000s ===
Year	Film	Editor(s)	Ref
2000 (26th)	Deathrow	Jess Navarro and Kelly Cruz	
2001 (27th)	Yamashita: The Tiger's Treasure	Manet Dayrit	
2002 (28th)	Mano Po	Tara Illenberger	
2003 (29th)	Malikmata	Vito Cajili	
2004 (30th)	Sigaw	Manet Dayrit	
2005 (31st)	Kutob	Vito Cajili	
2006 (32nd)	Ligalig	Jason Cahapay	
2007 (33rd)	Resiklo	Jay Halili	
2008 (34th)	Baler	Danny Anonuevo	
2009 (35th)	I Love You, Goodbye	Manet Dayrit and Efren Jarlego	

=== 2010s ===
Year	Film	Editor(s)	Ref
2010 (36th)	Rosario	John Wong	
2011 (37th)	Manila Kingpin: The Asiong Salonga Story	Jason Canapay and Ryan Orduna	
2012 (38th)	One More Try	Vito Cahilig	
2013 (39th)	10,000 Hours	Marya Ignacio	
2014 (40th)	English Only, Please	Marya Ignacio	
2015 (41st)	Nilalang	Jason Cahapay	
2016 (42nd)	Sunday Beauty Queen	Chuck Gutierrez	
2017 (43rd)	Siargao	Mark Victor	
2018 (44th)	Jack Em Popoy: The Puliscredibles	Tara Illenberger and Renewin Alano	
2019 (45th)	Write About Love	Vanessa de Leon	

=== 2020s ===
Year	Film	Editor(s)	Ref
2020 (46th)	Fan Girl	Benjamin Tolentino	
2021 (47th)	A Hard Day	Lawrence Fajardo	
2022 (48th)	Deleter	Nikolas Red	
2022 (48th)	Mamasapano: Now It Can Be Told	Paolo Emmanuel Magsino	
2022 (48th)	Nanahimik ang Gabi	Mo Zee	
2023 (49th)	Kampon	Benjamin Tolentino	
2023 (49th)	Becky and Badette	Benjamin Tolentino	
2023 (49th)	GomBurZa	Benjamin Tolentino	
2023 (49th)	Mallari	Noel Tonga and Nelson Villamor	
2023 (49th)	Rewind	Marya Ignacio	
2023 (49th)	When I Met You In Tokyo	Froilan Francia	
2024 (50th)	My Future You	Vanessa Ubas De Leon	
2024 (50th)	Espantaho	Benjo Ferrer	
2024 (50th)	Green Bones	Benjamin Tolentino	
2024 (50th)	Strange Frequencies: Taiwan Killer Hospital	Kurt Claridades	
2024 (50th)	The Kingdom	Tara Illenberger	
2024 (50th)	Topakk	Jamie Dumancas	
2025 (51st)	Unmarry	Benjo Ferrer	
2025 (51st)	Bar Boys: After School	Chuck Gutierrez	
2025 (51st)	Call Me Mother	Benjamin Tolentino	
2025 (51st)	I'mPerfect	Marya Ignacio	
2025 (51st)	Love You So Bad	Marya Ignacio	
2025 (51st)	Manila's Finest	Jay Halili and Noe Paguiligan	
