= Metro Manila Film Festival Award for Best Cinematography =

Award presented annually by the Metropolitan Manila Development Authority (MMDA)

- Awarded for: Best Cinematographer
- Country: Philippines
- Presented by: MMDA
- First award: 1975
- Currently held by: Raymond Red, Manila's Finest (2025)
- Website: www.mmda.gov.ph/mmff/

The Metro Manila Film Festival Award for Best Cinematography is an award presented annually by the Metropolitan Manila Development Authority (MMDA). It was first awarded at the 1st Metro Manila Film Festival ceremony, held in 1975; Nonong Rasca received the award for his cinematography in Kapitan Kulas and it is given to a cinematographer for work in one particular motion picture. Currently, nominees and winners are determined by Executive Committees, headed by the Metropolitan Manila Development Authority Chairman and key members of the film industry.

== Winners and nominees ==
=== 1970s ===
Year	Film	Cinematographer(s)	Ref
1975 (1st)	Kapitan Kulas	Nonong Rasca	
1976 (2nd)	Insiang	Conrado Baltazar	
1977 (3rd)	Mga Bilanggong Birhen	Romeo Vitug	
1978 (4th)	Atsay	Romeo Vitug	
1979 (5th)	Ang lihim ng Guadalupe	Ben Lobo	

=== 1980s ===
Year	Film	Cinematographer(s)	Ref
1980 (6th)	Kung Ako'y Iiwan Mo	Rody Lacap	
1981 (7th)	Pagbabalik ng Panday	Ver Reyes	
1982 (8th)	Himala	Sergio Lobo	
1983 (9th)	Karnal	Manolo Abaya	
1984 (10th)	Alapaap	Joe Tutanes	
1985 (11th)	Paradise Inn	Romeo Vitug	
1986 (12th)	Payaso	Romeo Vitug	
1987 (13th)	Anak Badjao	Apolinario Cuenco	
1988 (14th)		Romeo Vitug	
1989 (15th)	Ang Bukas ay Akin	Romeo Vitug	

=== 1990s ===
Year	Film	Cinematographer(s)	Ref
1990 (16th)	Ama Bakit Mo Ako Pinabayaan	Pedro Manding	
1991 (17th)	Juan Tamad at Mister Shooli sa Mongolian Barbeque (The Movie)	Johnny Arajo	
1992 (18th)	Takbo, Talon, Tili	Arnold Alvaro and Ramon Marcelino	
1993 (19th)	Kung Mawawala Ka Pa	Romeo Vitug	
1994 (20th)	Ang Pagbabalik ni Pedro Penduko	Ben Lobo	
1995 (21st)	-	-	
1996 (22nd)	Magic Temple	Joe Tutanes	
1997 (23rd)	Magic Kingdom	Richard Padernal	
1998 (24th)	José Rizal	Rody Lacap	
1999 (25th)	Muro-ami	Rody Lacap	

=== 2000s ===
Year	Film	Cinematographer(s)	Ref
2000 (26th)	Tanging Yaman	Videlle Meily	
2001 (27th)	Yamashita: The Tiger's Treasure	Neil Daza	
2002 (28th)	Mano Po	Leslie Garchitorena	
2003 (29th)	Mano Po 2: My Home	J. A. Tadena	
2004 (30th)	Panaghoy sa Suba	Ely Cruz	
2005 (31st)	Exodus: Tales from the Enchanted Kingdom	Lyle Sacris	
2006 (32nd)	Mano Po 5: Gua Ai Di	Charlie Peralta	
2007 (33rd)	Resiklo	Jay Linao	
2008 (34th)	Baler	Lee Briones-Meily	
2009 (35th)	I Love You, Goodbye	Lee Briones-Meily	
2009 (35th)	Shake, Rattle & Roll 11	Juan Lorenzo	

=== 2010s ===
Year	Film	Cinematographer(s)	Ref
2010 (36th)	Rosario	Carlo Mendoza	
2011 (37th)	Manila Kingpin: The Asiong Salonga Story	Carlo Mendoza	
2012 (38th)	Thy Womb	Odyssey Flores	
2013 (39th)	10,000 Hours	Marissa Floirendo	
2014 (39th)	Bonifacio: Ang Unang Pangulo	Carlo Mendoza	
2015 (41st)	Nilalang	Pao Orendain	
2016 (42nd)	Seklusyon	Neil Bion	
2017 (43rd)	Siargao	Odyssey Flores	
2018 (44th)	Aurora	Yam Laranas	
2019 (45th)	Sunod	Mycko David	
2019 (45th)	Mindanao	Odyssey Flores	
2019 (45th)	Write About Love	Neil Daza	

=== 2020s ===
Year	Film	Cinematographer(s)	Ref
2020 (46th)	Fan Girl	Neil Daza	
2020 (46th)	Suarez: The Healing Priest	Teejay Gonzalez	
2020 (46th)	Magikland	Rody Lacap	
2020 (46th)	Tagpuan	David Carlo Mendoza, Alberto Monteras II, Daniel Uy	
2020 (46th)	The Boy Foretold by the Stars	Marvin Reyes	
2020 (46th)	The Missing	Marvin Reyes	
2021 (47th)	Big Night!	Carlo Mendoza	
2021 (47th)	A Hard Day	Jun Aves	
2021 (47th)	Kun Maupay Man it Panahon	Teck Siang Lim	
2022 (48th)	Deleter	Ian Guevarra	
2022 (48th)	Nanahimik ang Gabi	Mo Zee	
2022 (48th)	Mamasapano: Now It Can Be Told	Paolo Emmanuel Magsino	
2022 (48th)	My Father, Myself	TM Malones	
2023 (49th)	GomBurZa	Carlo Mendoza	
2023 (49th)	Becky & Badette	Kara Moreno	
2023 (49th)	Kampon	Kara Moreno	
2023 (49th)	Firefly	Neil Daza	
2023 (49th)	Rewind	Neil Daza	
2023 (49th)	Mallari	Juan Lorenzo Orendain	
2023 (49th)	When I Met You In Tokyo	Shayne Sarte	
2024 (50th)	Green Bones	Neil Daza	
2024 (50th)	Espantaho	Neil Daza	
2024 (50th)	Strange Frequencies: Taiwan Killer Hospital	Mark Tirona	
2024 (50th)	The Kingdom	Shayne Sarte	
2024 (50th)	Topakk	Louie Quirino	
2024 (50th)	Uninvited	Pao Orendain	
2025 (51st)	Manila's Finest	Raymond Red	
2025 (51st)	Call Me Mother	Carlo Canlas Mendoza	
2025 (51st)	Love You So Bad	Zach Sycip	
2025 (51st)	Shake, Rattle & Roll Evil Origins	Moises M. Zee, Mark Joshua Tirona and Rommel Andreo Sales	
2025 (51st)	Unmarry	Kara Moreno	

== Multiple awards for Best Cinematography ==
Throughout the history of Metro Manila Film Festival (MMFF), there have been cinematographers who received multiple Awards for Best Cinematography. As of 2015 (41st MMFF), 6 cinematographers have received two or more Best Cinematography awards.

Scriptwriter	Record Set	First year awarded	Recent year awarded
Romeo Vitug	7	1978	1993
Carlo Mendoza	5	2010	2023
Rody Lacap	3	1980	1999
Lee Briones-Meily	2	2008	2009
Joe Tutanes	2	1984	1996
Ben Lobo	2	1979	1994
Neil Daza	2	2020	2024
