= Bar Boys: After School =

Filipino comedy-drama film by Kip Oebanda

- Theatrical release poster
- Directed by: Kip Oebanda
- Written by: Kip Oebanda; Carlo Enciso Catu; Zig Dulay
- Produced by: Leo Liban; Carlos Ortiz; Jon Galvez
- Starring: Carlo Aquino; Rocco Nacino; Enzo Pineda; Kean Cipriano
- Cinematography: Albert Banzon
- Edited by: Chuck Gutierrez
- Music by: Emerzon Texon
- Production company: 901 Studios
- Release date: December 25, 2025
- Running time: 126 minutes
- Country: Philippines
- Languages: Filipino; English
- Box office: ₱58 million

Bar Boys: After School is a 2025 Philippine comedy-drama film directed by Kip Oebanda from a screenplay he co-wrote with Carlo E. Catu and Zig Dulay. A direct sequel to the 2017 film Bar Boys, the film stars Carlo Aquino, Rocco Nacino, Enzo Pineda, and Kean Cipriano, who reprised their roles from the first film.

== Synopsis ==
The story, which is set ten years after the events of the first film, examines how time affects organizations, relationships, and people. It tells a moving but motivational tale about the unseen price of following one's aspirations.

== Cast ==
=== Main cast ===
- Carlo Aquino as Atty. Erik Vicencio
- Rocco Nacino as Atty. Torran Garcia
- Enzo Pineda as Atty. Christian Carlson
- Kean Cipriano as Joshua Zuniga

=== Supporting cast ===
- Will Ashley as Arvin Asuncion
- Glaiza de Castro as Jasmine Garcia
- Sassa Gurl as Trisha Perez
- Therese Malvar as CJ David
- Odette Khan as Justice Bing Hernandez
- Klarisse de Guzman as Mae Perez
- Emilio Daez as Ziggy Nicardo

=== Additional cast ===
- Vance Larena
- Jorybell Agoto
- Royce Cabrera
- Joel Saracho as Atty. Torran Garcia's Boss
- Julian Alturas
- Bryce Eusebio as Jonas
- Benedix Ramos as Bok
- Donna Cariaga as Anita
- Victor Neri as Atty. Mendez
- Nico Antonio as Security Guard

== Production ==
=== Pre-production ===
In 2024, Oebanda revealed that he was developing the script for the film. Oebanda cited two main inspirations for the second film: a lawyer affiliated with PISTON who had viewed the first installment, and the death of his and Dulay's mentor, screenwriter Bing Lao.

=== Casting ===
In August 2025, Aquino, Nacino, Pineda, and Cipriano confirmed that they would reprise their roles in the sequel. Reflecting on the sequel's development, Nacino noted that the story pitch made the cast realize how much the original had resonated with audiences, particularly law students anticipating the follow-up.

Sassa Gurl trained in acting, English, logic, public speaking, and rhetoric to prepare for her role, which was inspired by a class valedictorian from a prestigious law school. She described her character Trish, as a tribute to the resilience of transgender and gay students who made it through law school. "This character pays respect to those who didn't hide their identity, who took up space and pushed through despite the ridicule," she said. Separately, Malvar was offered the role of CJ during the premiere night of Balota, when Oebanda publicly announced her casting in front of the audience. Oebanda later explained to her that the character was inspired by Leni Robredo, which prompted her to accept the role.

During his stint on Pinoy Big Brother (PBB), Ashley was announced as part of the cast. Reportedly, he auditioned for the role two weeks before joining the reality show. He started his acting workshops just two days after finishing his PBB stint. Subsequently, Daez was cast as Ziggy following an audition process that spanned several months and involved more than 70 candidates. Preparatory workshops with Daez commenced in early July.

Filming began on June 29, along with the announcement of Cabrera joining the cast.

== Marketing ==
The first official teaser for Bar Boys: After School was released on September 1, 2025, through digital platforms under Cinema Bravo. The 56-second teaser was shared across Facebook, Twitter, and YouTube, introducing Ashley's character Arvin— a working law student balancing his studies and job. The teaser opens with Arvin venting to Torran, played by Nacino, a character from the original film.

== Release ==
The film was released on December 25, 2025, as part of the 51st Metro Manila Film Festival. It was rated PG by the Movie and Television Review and Classification Board (MTRCB).

It was also released worldwide through Amazon Prime Video in August 2026.

== Reception ==
The film received generally positive reviews from critics. Fred Hawson of ABS-CBN News praised the film for revisiting themes of integrity and friendship, noting the ensemble cast's performances as a highlight. Hannah Mallorca of Philippine Daily Inquirer described the film as a heartwarming reality check, singling out its emotional moments and character-driven storytelling.

In a review for PEP, Mark Angelo Ching noted that while the screenplay had some limitations, the cast delivered solid performances. Philbert Dy of Spot commented that the film occasionally relied on florid or soapy touches in depicting real-life situations, particularly in sequences featuring extended monologues, but also noted that the ensemble cast remained strong, with new additions Sassa Gurl, Therese Malvar, and Will Ashley contributing notable performances.

Stephanie Mayo of Daily Tribune wrote that the film was well-acted but occasionally weighed down by repetition and didactic sequences. LionhearTV noted that the sequel adopted a more reflective and mature tone than the original, blending humor and warmth while exploring themes of adulthood, justice, and moral challenges.

=== Accolades ===
Accolades received by Bar Boys: After School
Award ceremony	Date	Category	Recipient(s)	Result	Ref.
2025 Metro Manila Film Festival	December 27, 2025	Best Director	Kip Oebanda	Nominated	
2025 Metro Manila Film Festival	December 27, 2025	Best Actor	Carlo Aquino	Nominated	
2025 Metro Manila Film Festival	December 27, 2025	Best Supporting Actor	Will Ashley	Nominated	
2025 Metro Manila Film Festival	December 27, 2025	Best Supporting Actress	Odette Khan	Won	
2025 Metro Manila Film Festival	December 27, 2025	Best Screenplay	Kip Oebanda, Carlo Catu, Zig Dulay	Nominated	
2025 Metro Manila Film Festival	December 27, 2025	Best Editing	Chuck Gutierrez	Nominated	
2025 Metro Manila Film Festival	December 27, 2025	Best Visual Effects	John Kenneth Paclibar	Nominated	
2025 Metro Manila Film Festival	December 27, 2025	Best Float	Bar Boys: After School	Nominated	
2025 Metro Manila Film Festival	December 27, 2025	Fernando Poe Jr. Memorial Award for Excellence	Bar Boys: After School	Won	
2025 Metro Manila Film Festival	December 27, 2025	Most Gender-Sensitivity Award	Bar Boys: After School	Nominated	
Platinum Stallion National Media Awards	February 3, 2026	Film of the Year	Bar Boys: After School	Won	
Platinum Stallion National Media Awards	February 3, 2026	Director of the Year	Kip Oebanda	Won	
Platinum Stallion National Media Awards	February 3, 2026	Best Film Actor	Will Ashley	Won	
Platinum Stallion National Media Awards	February 3, 2026	Breakthrough Artist of the Year	Sassa Gurl	Won	
TAG Victorious Awards Chicago	April 4, 2026	Best Supporting Actor – Film	Will Ashley	Gold	
The EDDYS	July 5, 2026	Best Picture	Bar Boys: After School	Nominated	
The EDDYS	July 5, 2026	Best Director	Kip Oebanda	Nominated	
The EDDYS	July 5, 2026	Best Actor	Carlo Aquino	Nominated	
The EDDYS	July 5, 2026	Best Supporting Actor	Will Ashley	Won	
The EDDYS	July 5, 2026	Best Supporting Actress	Odette Khan	Nominated	
The EDDYS	July 5, 2026	Best Screenplay	Kip Oebanda, Carlo Catu, Zig Dulay	Nominated	
The EDDYS	July 5, 2026	Best Editing	Chuck Gutierrez	Nominated	
Gawad Urian Award	October 8, 2026	Best Film	Bar Boys: After School	Nominated	
Gawad Urian Award	October 8, 2026	Best Director	Kip Oebanda	Nominated	
Gawad Urian Award	October 8, 2026	Best Actor	Carlo Aquino	Won	
Gawad Urian Award	October 8, 2026	Best Actress	Odette Khan	Won	
Gawad Urian Award	October 8, 2026	Best Supporting Actor	Will Ashley	Won	
Gawad Urian Award	October 8, 2026	Best Screenplay	Kip Oebanda, Carlo Catu, Zig Dulay	Nominated	
Gawad Urian Award	October 8, 2026	Best Editing	Chuck Gutierrez	Nominated	
PMPC Star Awards for Movies	October 25, 2026	Movie of the Year	Bar Boys: After School	Nominated	
PMPC Star Awards for Movies	October 25, 2026	Movie Director of the Year	Kip Oebanda	Nominated	
PMPC Star Awards for Movies	October 25, 2026	Movie Supporting Actor of the Year	Will Ashley	Nominated	
PMPC Star Awards for Movies	October 25, 2026	Movie Supporting Actress of the Year	Odette Khan	Nominated	
PMPC Star Awards for Movies	October 25, 2026	New Movie Actor of the Year	Emilio Daez	Nominated	
PMPC Star Awards for Movies	October 25, 2026	New Movie Actress of the Year	Klarisse de Guzman	Nominated	
PMPC Star Awards for Movies	October 25, 2026	Movie Ensemble Acting of the Year	Bar Boys: After School	Nominated	
PMPC Star Awards for Movies	October 25, 2026	Movie Screenwriter of the Year	Kip Oebanda, Carlo Catu, Zig Dulay	Nominated	
PMPC Star Awards for Movies	October 25, 2026	Movie Editor of the Year	Chuck Gutierrez	Nominated	
PMPC Star Awards for Movies	October 25, 2026	Movie Musical Scorer of the Year	Emerzon Texon	Nominated	
FAMAS Award	October 27, 2026	Best Director	Kip Oebanda	Nominated	
FAMAS Award	October 27, 2026	Best Actor	Carlo Aquino	Nominated	
FAMAS Award	October 27, 2026	Best Supporting Actor	Will Ashley	Nominated	
FAMAS Award	October 27, 2026	Best Supporting Actress	Odette Khan	Nominated	
FAMAS Award	October 27, 2026	Best Screenplay	Kip Oebanda, Carlo Catu, Zig Dulay	Won	
