= 1985 Metro Manila Film Festival =

Film festival edition

- Date: December 25, 1985 to January 3, 1986
- Site: Manila

Highlights
- Best Picture: Paradise Inn
- Most awards: Ano ang Kulay ng Mukha ng Diyos? (6)

Television coverage
- Network: MBS

The 11th Metro Manila Film Festival was held in 1985.

Ten movies participated in the 1985 Metro Manila Film Festival. Amazaldy Film Production's Paradise Inn, a film by Celso Ad. Castillo, received five major awards, including the Best Picture and Best Actress for Vivian Velez, among others. The second Best Picture, Triple A Films' The Moises Padilla Story: The Missing Chapter, won four awards, including the Best Actor for Anthony Alonzo and Best Screenplay for Tom Adrales. The third Best Picture, Lea Productions' Ano ang Kulay ng Mukha ng Diyos?, received the most awards with six, including the Best Director for Lino Brocka and Best Child Performer for Katrin Gonzales.

None of the entries grossed more than ₱4 million, with Seiko Films' God... Save Me! being the festival's top grosser; combined, all ten entries grossed less than ₱20 million.

== Entries ==
Title	Starring	Studio	Director	Genre
Ano ang Kulay ng Mukha ng Diyos?	Gina Alajar, Michael de Mesa, Edu Manzano, Caridad Sanchez and Kristin Gonzales	Lea Productions	Lino Brocka	Drama
Boboy Tibayan: Tigre ng Cavite	Ramon Revilla Jr., Lani Mercado, Lyka Ugarte, George Estregan, Raoul Aragonn, Perla Bautista, Rez Cortez, Conrad Poe, Bomber Moran	Imus Productions	Pepe Marcos	Action, Drama
Bomba Arienda	Ace Vergel, Charito Solis, William Martinez, Carmi Martin, Tommy Abuel and Coney Reyes	Brown Fox Organization	Mel Chionglo	Biography
God... Save Me!	Christopher de Leon, Charito Solis, Rio Locsin, Cherie Gil, Tommy Abuel, Juan Rodrigo, Rose Ann Gonzales	Seiko Films	Carlo J. Caparas	Drama
Hee Man: Master of None	Redford White, Roderick Paulate, Emily Loren, Don Pepot, Tatlong Itlog, Joaquin Fajardo, Maning Bato, Imelda Caparas, Ernie Ortega, Mario Escudero	Cine International Group	Tony Y. Reyes	Action, Comedy, Fantasy
I Can't Stop Loving You	Nora Aunor, Tirso Cruz III, Rowell Santiago, Jackie Lou Blanco, Lani Mercado, Miguel Rodriguez, Nadia Montenegro, Richard Gomez, Liza Lorena, Marissa Delgado	Regal Films	Elwood Perez	Drama, Romance
Menudo At Pandesal	Gloria Diaz, Carmi Martin, Tanya Gomez, Janice De Belen, Paquito Diaz, Max Alvarado, Lou Veloso & Caridad Sanchez	Essex Films	Danny L. Zialcita	Comedy
The Moises Padilla Story: The Missing Chapter	Anthony Alonzo, Charito Solis, Gina Alajar, Tommy Abuel, George Estregan, Raoul Aragonn, Juan Rodrigo, Rex Lapid, Daria Ramirez, Fred Moro, Roi Vinzon	Triple A Films	Willie Milan	Action
Oks Na Oks Partner	Niño Muhlach, Janice de Belen, Aga Muhlach	D'Wonder Films	J. Erastheo Navoa	Comedy
Paradise Inn	Lolita Rodriguez, Vivian Velez, Dennis Roldan, Michael de Mesa, Robert Arevalo, Armida Siguon Reyna, Lito Anzures, Jinggoy Estrada, Lucita Soriano, Rodolfo 'Boy' Garcia, Bing Davao, Jaime Fabregas, Juan Carlos	Amazaldy Film Production	Celso Ad. Castillo	Drama

== Winners and nominees ==
=== Awards ===
Winners are listed first and highlighted in boldface.

Best Film	Best Director
**Paradise Inn – Amazaldy Productions**; The Moises Padilla Story: The Missing Chapter – Triple A Films (2nd); Ano ang Kulay ng Mukha ng Diyos? – Lea Productions (3rd)	Lino Brocka – Ano ang Kulay ng Mukha ng Diyos?
Best Actor	Best Actress
**Anthony Alonzo – The Moises Padilla Story: The Missing Chapter**	Vivian Velez – Paradise Inn
Best Supporting Actor	Best Supporting Actress
**Tommy Abuel – The Moises Padilla Story: The Missing Chapter**	Cherie Gil – God... Save Me!
Best Story	Best Cinematography
**Celso Ad. Castillo – Paradise Inn**	Romeo Vitug – Paradise Inn
Best Editing	Best Music
**Edgardo Vinarao – Paradise Inn**	Willy Cruz – Ano ang Kulay ng Mukha ng Diyos?
Best Art Direction	Best Screenplay
**Benjie de Guzman – Ano ang Kulay ng Mukha ng Diyos?**	Tom Adrales – The Moises Padilla Story: The Missing Chapter
Best Child Performer	Best Sound Engineering
**Katrin Gonzales – Ano ang Kulay ng Mukha ng Diyos?**	Rolly Ruta – Ano ang Kulay ng Mukha ng Diyos?

== Multiple awards ==
Awards	Film
6	Ano ang Kulay ng Mukha ng Diyos?
5	Paradise Inn
4	The Moises Padilla Story: The Missing Chapter

Preceded by 1984 Metro Manila Film Festival	Metro Manila Film Festival; 1985	Succeeded by 1986 Metro Manila Film Festival
