= Will Ashley (actor) =

Filipino actor (born 2002)

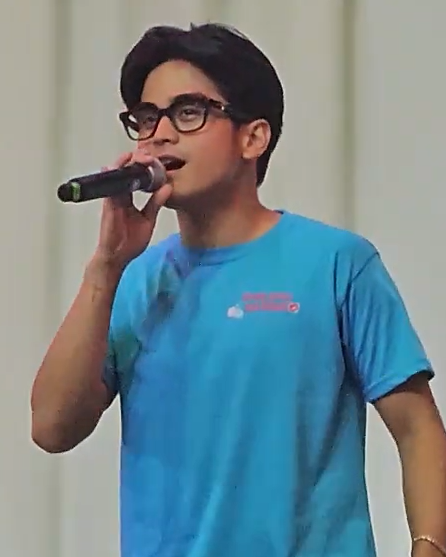
- Ashley in 2025
- Born: Will Ashley Ramos de Leon; September 17, 2002 (age 24); Imus, Cavite, Philippines
- Occupations: Actor; singer
- Years active: 2013–present
- Agent: GMA Network (2013–present)
- Height: 5 ft 7 in (170 cm)
- Musical career
- Genre: P-pop
- Instrument: Vocals
- Label: StarPop

Will Ashley Ramos de Leon (born September 17, 2002), known professionally as Will Ashley, is a Filipino actor and singer. He gained popularity for his supporting roles in the television series Prima Donnas (2019–2022) and Unbreak My Heart (2023), and the films Balota (2024) and Bar Boys: After School (2025). His accolades include a Gawad Urian, a PMPC Star Awards for Movies, an EDDYS, and a PAFTA. In 2026, he released his debut extended play Liham.

== Early life ==
Will Ashley Ramos de Leon was born on September 17, 2002, in Imus, Cavite. He was six years old when his father died, which led him to become the primary breadwinner for his family. Ashley was subsequently raised by his mother, with whom he shared a close bond throughout his childhood, while often credited her encouragement and guidance in supporting his acting career.

Ashley's introduction to the entertainment industry came through his aunt, who helped him audition for commercial projects. This led him to begin his career in show business, initially participating in VTRs for commercials, which he admitted was limited at that time. Ashley also ventured into modeling at 13 years old. In 2021, he graduated from senior high school with a specialization in Accountancy, Business and Management (ABM).

== Career ==
=== 2013–2018: Early roles ===
Ashley started his career by being cast in several local commercials when he was a child. He officially started his showbiz career in 2013, landing his first role at 11 years old in the GMA afternoon series Villa Quintana, where Ashley portrayed the younger version of Elmo Magalona's character Isagani.

In 2014, he was cast as the young version of Miguel Tanfelix's titular character in the GMA family drama Niño. He appeared in his first Magpakailanman episode in 2015 titled "Isang Mister, Lima ang Misis". Ashley continues his stint of playing young versions of main characters up until 2017. In 2018, he took on the role of Elijah "Ely" Resurreccion-Venganza, the brother of the titular character, in the telenovela Contessa. At a media conference, Ashley revealed that Glaiza de Castro shared acting tips with him.

=== 2019–2024: Transition to lead roles and rising popularity ===
In 2019, he joined Jillian Ward, Althea Ablan, and Sofia Pablo in the hit GMA afternoon series Prima Donnas as Nolan Dimasalang, which aired until 2022. Ashley was also cast as the voice actor for Ash Ketchum in the Filipino dub of Pokémon XYZ, the 19th season of the popular franchise. He also portrayed Cris, a teenage boy who becomes a victim of abuse by his male teacher, in the Magpakailanman episode titled "Arrest My Son's Rapist". He described the role as one of the most challenging he had taken on, noting that although it was his first time playing such a heavy character, he accepted the part to grow as an actor and to faithfully portray the real-life story behind the episode.

He later guest-starred in Pepito Manaloto: Ang Tunay na Kuwento as the lovable and sweet Andy, Clarissa's puppy love. In 2021, before the second season of Prima Donnas aired, Ashley, Ablan, and Alejo appeared together in an episode of Wish Ko Lang!.

Following Prima Donnas, Ashley was slated for the role of Peter Luna in GMA's television drama The Fake Life in 2022. He described his role as "challenging", as the character is full of anger and vengefulness in comparison to his former role as a reliable childhood friend. Director Adolfo Alix Jr. praised Ashley for his portrayal of Peter, stating: "He's ready to take on more challenging and out-of-the-box characters! His role [in The Fake Life] took him out of his comfort zone and he absorbed everything which will bring out what he needs to shape Peter's character". Ashley was also featured in Mano Po Legacy: The Flower Sisters, playing Andrew James Chua-Tan, one of Lily Chua's sons. He expressed pride in the role, describing his character as someone who strived to be a good son by making his parents happy. Director Joey Reyes commended his performance in the series, saying it "went beyond expectations" and that he "gave the character the depth and compassion so needed to make Andrew a tragic victim of tradition and expectations". The same year, Ashley starred in his first Regal Studio Presents episode titled "My Favorite Son". He played the titular character Christian, a teenager who dreams of becoming a musician, much to the dismay of his father, who wanted him to pursue a career as a seaman. Ashley also showcased his talent in singing and playing the guitar in the episode. His performance was warmly received.

In 2023, Ashley starred in GMA and ABS-CBN's first major collaborative television series Unbreak My Heart. He portrayed Jerry, a friend of Joshua Garcia's character Renz, who falls in love with Gwen, portrayed by Bianca de Vera. Ashley noted that it reminded him of the classic Romeo and Juliet. The romantic drama received positive reviews from critics and garnered a strong following from the general public. It was also the most streamed series in Viu that year. In April, he played the role of viral content creator Sean Beltran in the feature episode of Magpakailanman: The Viral Cancer Survivor. He was also revealed as part of the ensemble cast for the horror film The Vigil. In addition, Ashley portrayed Alvin, a member of a popular 90s dance group, in Regal Studio Presents: The Poster Boy.

In March 2024, Ashley appeared as one of the season openers for Regal Studio Presents in the episode titled "Swipe for Romance". The following month, he starred in Adolfo Alix Jr.'s May-December film X & Y alongside Ina Raymundo. Ashley expressed feeling nervous and shy while preparing for his role as Xander, particularly due to the intimate scenes in the script, but noted that setting aside his nerves was necessary to deliver effective takes during filming. The film premiered in local cinemas in April of the same year and had a limited run. Raymundo later praised Ashley for his professionalism on set, describing him as a "perfect gentleman" during their kissing scene and noting that, despite some initial nervousness, he handled the moment with confidence. He returned to Regal Studio Presents in July for the episode "Loving Miss Selfish", playing Miguel, a gullible but earnest top employee. In October, he appeared again in "Pawfect Match", a romantic special centered on animal adoption and healthcare, where he played Alex, a volunteer at a local animal shelter. The episode formed part of the program's third-anniversary celebration. In November, he portrayed Quentin, the son of Candy Pangilinan, in Magpakailanman's 22nd-anniversary opening episode, "My Very Special Son", which told Pangilinan's life story. The episode focused on Pangilinan's experience caring for Quentin, who was diagnosed with ADHD and autism. That year, he also starred in his first Cinemalayan film Balota, directed by Kip Oebanda. Ashley portrayed the role of Enzo, the son of the main character, Teacher Emmy, who is portrayed by Marian Rivera. The film premiered at the 20th Cinemalaya Philippine Independent Film Festival on August 3. Oebanda later re-edited the film for its mainstream release, noting that the "Marian-Will" dynamic was given more emphasis as the Cinemalayan audiences loved it. It was released in cinemas nationwide on October 16. The indie film has achieved significant commercial success in theaters. In a feature with the Society of Filipino Film Reviewers, he shared that the film became a form of distraction for him, as his grandfather had died a week before filming began. Ashley stated that he immersed himself more fully in the role through Oebanda's distinctive directing style and personal accounts of experiences with policemen, while collaboratively developing his character's backstory with Rivera. His performance was widely praised by online audiences. Ashley was later nominated for Movie Supporting Actor of the Year at the 6th VP Choice Awards and for Best Supporting Actor at the 73rd FAMAS Awards.

=== 2025–present: Mainstream popularity and Liham ===
In January 2025, he was featured in GMA afternoon television series Prinsesa ng City Jail. Ashley portrayed the role of Onse, the childhood friend of Princess who also grew up in the area of city jail. The following month, Ashley portrayed the role of introverted germaphobe Columbus in the romantic episode Regal Studios Presents: My Sweet Girl Next Door. In March, he was revealed to be one of the 15 initial housemates for Pinoy Big Brother: Celebrity Collab Edition, a collaboration between ABS-CBN and GMA for its 20th anniversary. This would be the second time where he would take part in a collaborative venture between the two major networks. Ashley joined with the moniker, "Ang Mama's Dream Bae ng Cavite", as one of the Kapuso housemates. He expressed nervousness about the reality show's challenges but was excited about the experience, which he cited as his motivation for joining the program. In the show, Ashley reunited with former Unbreak My Heart co-star Bianca de Vera, Balota co-star Esnyr Ranollo, and Mano Po Legacy: The Flower Sisters co-star AZ Martinez. He became the edition's Kapuso second big placer alongside Kapamilya housemate Ralph de Leon. In August, Ashley signed a recording contract with StarPop, a music label under ABS-CBN. He also appeared as a contestant of the game show Rainbow Rumble. In October, it was revealed that two of the films Ashley is starring in are part of the 2025 Metro Manila Film Festival; Bar Boys: After School as Arvin Asuncion and Love You So Bad as Victor "Vic" Alvarez, which were shown in cinemas on December 25. The former gave him the Best Supporting Actor at The EDDYS and Best Supporting Actor at the 49th Gawad Urian Awards.

The television series The Secrets of Hotel 88, in which he is one of the main cast as Kiko Endaya, premiered in February 2026. In April, the film Poon, in which Ashley is part of the ensemble cast, made its world premiere at the 48th Moscow International Film Festival, while its domestic release was on September 9. In May, it was announced that he will headline the television series Delivery Boi as Roberto "Boi" Ragasa, a dyslexic delivery rider who takes on the job while pursuing his dreams and doing everything for his family, which premiered on October 19. On September 18, Ashley released his debut extended play Liham. Its first single "Paborito", in which he is credited as one of the composers, was pre-released on August 14. Ashley is also credited as one of the composers for its tracks "Sinta" and "Kasalanan, Pinagsisihan". He is also one of the main cast of the 2026 Metro Manila Film Festival entry film Amir, which will be shown in cinemas on December 25.

== Other ventures ==
=== Activism and philanthropy ===
In 2019, Ashley joined the GMA Kapuso Foundation as an advocate for educational support through its pillar project, Unang Hakbang sa Kinabukasan (UHSK).

In 2020, he announced that he is an ally to the LGBTQ+ community. In a heartfelt Facebook post through his collaboration with Village Pipol for its Pride issue, Ashley publicly expressed his support for the community, emphasizing the importance of inclusivity, respect, and advocacy.

In 2025, he participated in an animal welfare fundraiser for Pawssion Project, which raised ₱200,000. Ashley donated his cash prize of ₱500,000 from PBB to Father Al's Children Foundation, which was also his selected beneficiary for the show's charity task. He also volunteered at two community soup kitchens: Trining's Kitchen Stories in Marikina and Urban Chick Maginhawa in Quezon City, where he assisted in preparing and serving hot meals to residents affected by Typhoon Crising and the southwest monsoon (Habagat). Ashley also contributed to online fundraising efforts to support more communities. In September, he participated in Nescafé Plan's "Kape't Bisig" campaign, which aimed to spotlight the stories of young Filipino coffee farmers. As part of the initiative, Ashley lent his TikTok account for a day to Queenie Subasco, a 21-year-old Agriculture Technology graduate and beneficiary of the Nescafé Kape't Bisig sa Pagbabangon Educational Grant, to share her experiences in farming. He expressed support for the campaign's goal of empowering the next generation of farmers. In November, Ashley participated in an event where all proceeds will go to the Autism Society Philippines (ASP).

In 2026, he participated and donated in a charity event of a non-governmental organization supporting children.

=== Endorsements ===
In 2015–2016, Ashley appeared in several television commercials and had endorsed brands including UFC products, Insular Life, and Rebisco.

In 2023, he was named as the new brand ambassador of April Aesthetic Medical Clinic.

In 2025, Ashley was announced as one of Acerpure's newest ambassadors, as well as for Greenwich. He also participated in a promotional collaboration with National Book Store as part of its "National Hunt" campaign. Ashley became the brand ambassador of Blackwater, as well as an endorser of its BW Women's Perfume Lotion Spray.

In 2026, he became the brand ambassador of Piattos and Samsung.

== Artistry ==
=== Influences ===
Ashley was inspired to pursue acting after seeing actor Alden Richards in a mall show when he was just 10 years old. In a 2025 interview with ABS-CBN, he revealed that television personality Melai Cantiveros-Francisco also served as an inspiration for him due to her longevity in the showbiz industry after her PBB stint. Ashley also cited actress Odette Khan as an influence, saying that their collaboration on Bar Boys: After School inspired his desire to leave a lasting legacy in the industry.

=== Role choices ===
Although open to the idea of love teams, Ashley mentioned that he prefers working solo because it gives him more creative freedom. He shared that not being part of a love team has allowed him more opportunities to explore other characters and roles as an actor.

== Public image ==
In 2018, Ashley was featured in the episode of Ang Pinaka titled "Promising Kapuso Teen Stars", where he ranked ninth. In discussing the actor's popularity, director and writer Don Michael Perez remarked, "There must be something about this boy na iniidolo talaga ng masa" (translated as "that the masses idolize"). Host Rovilson Fernandez predicted that he "is expected to become one of the heartthrobs in the mold of Alden Richards". DJ and showbiz columnist Jana Chuchu agreed, describing Ashley as very charming. Meanwhile, PEP contributor Rommel Gonzales noted that he appeared to be following the path of Miguel Tanfelix.

In 2020, commenting on Ashley's personality behind the camera, Village Pipol described him as a "sweet guy", noting that "his gentleness remains unreal and he almost seems too good to be true".

In 2025, Ashley gained significant online attention in his PBB stint, earning the moniker "Nation's Son". He also led the Nylon Manila poll for the favorite housemate of his edition. Ashley became one of the inspirations behind the songs: "Ikaw, Ikaw, Ikaw" by Filipino artist Eliza Maturan and Singaporean artist Icebox, "Obviously" by the indie band Sud, and "Bumabalik" by the indie band Healy After Dark. He was featured in RAWR Mag in a piece highlighting his career growth, rise to fame, and his evolving public persona marked by charm and confidence. Sports Dong-a considered him a "Philippine Gen Z Star" due to his domestic popularity and constant international reach. In a June feature titled "The Slow Burn That Is Will Ashley de Leon", published by the Philippine Daily Inquirer, Ashley was praised for his growing impact in the entertainment industry. The article highlighted his steady rise in the public eye as a versatile performer, with Balota co-star Sassa Gurl sharing, "Will can sing, dance, and, most especially, he is a great actor—he can capture the audience with just his eyes". He was also featured in the Manila Standard, where his showbiz profile was discussed. Additionally, Ashley was included in Metro Magazine alongside his fellow PBB Big Four placers. His personal growth and transformation were highlighted in an exclusive solo feature titled "How PBB transformed Will Ashley from an Introvert Housemate to the Nation's Son". In VMan Southeast Asia's second digital issue, for which he was the cover star, the magazine described him as someone who "embodies a new generation of actors and a different way of moving through the spotlight, one that is calm and resistant to haste", characterizing him as someone disciplined, marked by patience and persistence. Ashley is further described as an actor in his own lane.

In 2026, BusinessMirror writer Ricky Gallardo claimed that he is one of the most sought-after and in-demand actors due to his back-to-back acting projects, as well as a heavy favorite to win acting awards. PEP contributor Jerry Olea recognized Ashley as one of the fastest-rising actors in the Philippine entertainment industry and director Adolfo Alix Jr. acknowledged his evolution as an actor. He was praised by actress Meryll Soriano for his acting potential in different genres, perceiving Ashley as a future "all-around actor".

== Personal life ==
In August 2019, Ashley started a YouTube channel where he uploaded song covers and vlogs among others. Ashley received a Silver Play Button from YouTube in 2021.

In 2025, during his appearance in PBB, Ashley spoke about his struggles with being vulnerable and expressed how he finds it challenging to open up to other people in fear of his emotions becoming too "burdensome".

== Filmography ==
=== Film ===
Key
†	Denotes films that have not yet been released

Year	Title	Role	Notes	Ref.
2024	X & Y	Xander	Main cast	
2024	Balota	Enzo	20th Cinemalaya Philippine Independent Film Festival entry; Supporting role	
2024	The Vigil	Michael	Main cast	
2025	Bar Boys: After School	Arvin Asuncion	2025 Metro Manila Film Festival entry; Supporting role	
2025	Love You So Bad	Victor "Vic" Alvarez	2025 Metro Manila Film Festival entry; Main cast	
2026	Poon	Carlo	Ensemble cast	
2026	Amir †	TBA	2026 Metro Manila Film Festival entry; Main cast	

=== Television ===
Year	Title	Role	Notes	Ref.
2013	Villa Quintana	Young Isagani	Credited as Ashley de Leon	
2014	My BFF	Jasper	Credited as Will Ashley de Leon	
2014	Niño	Young Niño	Credited as Will Ashley de Leon	
2014	Innamorata	Young Dencio	Guest cast	
2015	Magpakailanman: Isang Mister, Lima ang Misis	Jay-ar	Season 1, Episode 146; credited as Will Ashley de Leon	
2015	Pari 'Koy	Joshua Banal	Credited as Will Ashley de Leon	
2015	Little Nanay	Young Peter	Episode 1; uncredited	
2016	Once Again	Young Aldrin	Guest cast	
2016	Alyas Robin Hood	Young Jekjek	Credited as Will Ashley de Leon	
2017	Destined to be Yours	Sol Obispo	Recurring role	
2017	Mulawin vs. Ravena	Teen Uwak-ak	Episode 85; uncredited	
2017	Magpakailanman: Ang bestfriend kong aso	Teen Eddieboy	Season 1, Episode 212	
2017	Dear Uge: Aso't Pusa	Kyle	Episode 59	
2018	Lip Sync Battle Philippines	Guest performer	Season 3, Episode 12	
2018	Contessa	Elijah "Ely" Resurrecion-Venganza	Supporting role; credited as Will Ashley de Leon	
2019	Maynila: The Wicked Tita	Rico	Episode 25 (2019)	
2019	Magpakailanman: Arrest My Son's Rapist	Cris	Episode 317	
2019	Pepito Manaloto: Ang Tunay na Kwento	Andy	Episode 333	
2019	Maynila: Friends-Ever	Mesh	Episode 37 (2019)	
2019	Magpakailanman: Ang pumatay nang dahil sa'yo	Young Mark	Episode 328	
2019	Pokémon XYZ	Ash Ketchum	Voice role (Filipino dub)	
2019	Studio 7	Guest performer	Episode 11	
2019–2022	Prima Donnas	Nolan Dimasalang	Supporting role	
2021	Catch Me Out Philippines	Celebrity catcher	Guest appearance	
2021	The Lost Recipe	Tarragon	Recurring role; one episode uncredited	
2021–2022	The World Between Us	Young Brian	Recurring role; credited as Will Ashley de Leon	
2022	Regal Studio Presents: My Favorite Son	Christian	Season 2, Episode 5	
2022	Daig Kayo ng Lola Ko: Pao Pasaway	Pao	Season 1, Episodes 176–177	
2022	Regal Studio Presents: Once a Dad	Manley	Season 3, Episode 4	
2022	The Fake Life	Peter Luna	Supporting role	
2022	Daig Kayo ng Lola Ko: Game Over	Luigi	Season 1, Episodes 200–203	
2022	Tadhana: Isabella	Andrei	Season 1, Episodes 224–226	
2022–2023	Mano Po Legacy: The Flower Sisters	Andrew James Chua-Tan	Supporting role	
2022–2025	Family Feud	Player	Season 1, Episode 129 (2022), Season 3, Episode 2 and 142 (2025)	
2022–2023	The Boobay and Tekla Show	Guest	Episode 108 (2022), Episode 197 (2023)	
2022–2024	TiktoClock	Guest	Episode 69 (2022), Episodes 388 and 434 (2024)	
2023	Magpakailanman: The Viral Cancer Survivor	Sean Beltran	Episode 454	
2023	Unbreak My Heart	Jeremiah "Jerry" Keller	Supporting role	
2023	Regal Studio Presents: The Poster Boy	Alvin	Season 9, Episode 5	
2023	Fast Talk with Boy Abunda	Guest	Episode 192, Episode 205	
2023–2024	Lovers & Liars	Young Martin	Recurring role	
2024	Regal Studio Presents: Swipe for Romance	Miko	Season 11, Episode 1	
2024	Regal Studio Presents: Loving Miss Selfish	Miguel	Season 12, Episode 6	
2024	Regal Studio Presents: Pawfect Match	Alex	Season 13, Episode 4	
2024	Magpakailanman: My Very Special Son	Quentin	Episode 519	
2025	Prinsesa ng City Jail	Onse Rivera	Supporting role	
2025	Regal Studio Presents: My Sweet Girl Next Door	Columbus	Season 14, Episode 7	
2025	Pinoy Big Brother: Celebrity Collab Edition	Housemate	Kapuso Second Big Placer	
2025	It's Showtime	Guest Performer / Judge	For the show's segment "Breaking Muse and Escort Mo, Show Mo"	
2025	Sanggang Dikit FR	Corporal Wilbert Mariano	Guest appearance	
2025	Rainbow Rumble	Contestant	Season 2, Episode 16	
2025	Daig Kayo ng Lola Ko: Hotel de Luma	Willard	Season 1, Episodes 250–251	
2025	Daig Kayo ng Lola Ko: Beast Friends Forever	Willard	Season 1, Episodes 252–253	
2025	Babae sa Bintana	Justin	Vertical series	
2025	Pinoy Big Brother: Celebrity Collab Edition 2.0	Houseguest	Season 4, Days 38 and 63	
2025	ASAP	Guest performer	ABS-CBN Christmas Special Part 2	
2026	The Secrets of Hotel 88	Kiko Endaya	Main cast	
2026	Delivery Boi	Roberto "Boi" Ragasa	Main cast	
2026	Pinoy Big Brother: Collab 3.0	Guest performer	Season 12, Day 1	

=== Music video appearances ===
Year	Song	Artist	Ref.
2025	"Lasik"	Hey June!	

== Discography ==
=== Extended plays ===
List of extended plays, showing selected details
Title	Details
Liham	Released: September 18, 2026; Label: StarPop; Formats: Digital download, streaming; Track listing: 1. "Paborito"; 2. "AAKH!"; 3. "Harana Para Sa'yo"; 4. "Dito Ka Na Lang"; 5. "Sa Piling Mo"; 6. "Sinta"; 7. "Matutulog"; 8. "Kasalanan, Pinagsisihan"

=== Singles ===
List of singles, showing year released, and album name
Title	Year	Album
"Paborito"	2026	Liham

=== Soundtrack appearances ===
List of soundtrack appearances, showing year released
Title	Year	Notes	Ref.
"Liwanag Natin ang Isa't Isa"	2026	GMA Christmas Station ID	

=== Songwriting credits ===
List of songs, showing year released, artist name, and album name
Title	Year	Artist(s)	Album	Lyricist	Composer	Ref.
"Paborito"	2026	Will Ashley	Liham	Yes	Yes	
"Sinta"	2026	Will Ashley	Liham	Yes	Yes	
"Kasalanan, Pinagsisihan"	2026	Will Ashley	Liham	Yes	Yes	

== Live performances ==
=== Concerts ===
List of concerts, showing dates, venues, and locations
Title	Headlining artist(s)	Date and venue	Notes	Ref.
Will Ashley Live	Will Ashley	October 18, 2025; New Frontier Theater, Quezon City	First solo concert	

=== Showcases ===
List of showcases, showing dates, venues, and locations
Title	Associated album(s)	Date and venue	Song(s) played	Ref.
Liham: Will Ashley Album Launch	Liham	September 20, 2026; SM North EDSA Skydome, Quezon City	"Paborito"; "AAKH!"; "Harana Para Sa'yo"; "Dito Ka Na Lang"; "Sa Piling Mo"; "Sinta"; "Matutulog"; "Kasalanan, Pinagsisihan"; "Nandito Ako" (with Ralph de Leon); "Risk It All" (with Mika Salamanca); "Kahit Maputi Na Ang Buhok Ko"	

== Accolades ==
=== Awards and nominations ===
Name of the award ceremony, year presented, category, recipient of the award and the result of the nomination
Award ceremony	Year	Category	Recipient	Result	Ref.
FAMAS Award	2025	Best Supporting Actor	Balota	Nominated	
FAMAS Award	2026	Best Supporting Actor	Bar Boys: After School	Nominated	
Gawad PASADO	2026	PinakaPASADOng Aktor	Love You So Bad	Nominated	
Gawad Urian Award	2026	Best Supporting Actor	Bar Boys: After School	Won	
Luna Awards	2026	Best Supporting Actor	Bar Boys: After School	Pending	
Manila Film Critics Circle Awards	2025	Best Supporting Actor	Balota	Won	
Metro Manila Film Festival	2025	Best Actor	Love You So Bad	Nominated	
Metro Manila Film Festival	2025	Best Supporting Actor	Bar Boys: After School	Nominated	
Philippine Arts, Film and Television Awards	2026	Best Supporting Actor	Balota	Won	
Platinum Stallion National Media Awards	2026	Best Film Actor	Bar Boys: After School	Won	
PMPC Star Awards for Movies	2025	New Movie Actor of the Year	Balota	Won	
PMPC Star Awards for Movies	2026	Movie Supporting Actor of the Year	Bar Boys: After School	Nominated	
TAG Victorious Awards Chicago (Note: Organized by the Filipino-American community in Chicago, it selects its honorary inductees based on votes cast by the public via Patreon.)	2026	Best Supporting Actor – Film	Bar Boys: After School	Gold	
The EDDYS	2026	Best Supporting Actor	Bar Boys: After School	Won	
VP Choice Awards (Note: Produced by Village Pipol and Red Entertainment Inc., it recognizes individuals, brands, and creators who have flourished in their respective fields.)	2025	Movie Supporting Actor of the Year	Balota	Nominated	
VP Choice Awards	2026	Movie Actor of the Year	Love You So Bad	Nominated	

=== Other awards ===
Name of the award ceremony, year presented, category, recipient of the award and the result of the nomination
Award ceremony	Year	Category	Recipient	Result	Ref.
Anak TV Seal Awards	2025	Male Makabata Star – Television	Will Ashley	Won	
Anak TV Seal Awards	2025	Male Net Makabata Star – Online	Will Ashley	Won	
Gawad PASADO	2026	PinakaPASADOng Dangal ng Kabataan	Will Ashley	Won	
Metro Manila Film Festival	2025	Montesa Male Star of the Night	Will Ashley	Won	
VP Choice Awards	2026	Face of the Year – Male Adult	Will Ashley	First place	
Zeenfluential Awards (Note: Launched in 2025, it spotlights creators, artists, storytellers, and cultural forces who continue to influence conversations across music, film, fashion, and digital media.)	2025	Zeenfluential Dynamic Duo	Will Ashley (with Bianca de Vera)	Won	

=== State and cultural honors ===
Name of country or organization, year given, and name of honor
Country or organization	Year	Honor	Ref.
Outstanding Men and Women of the Philippines (Note: Founded and organized by Richard Hiñola, it honors exemplary individuals who have made significant contributions to the nation in various fields.)	2023	Outstanding Youth	
Philippine Empowered Men and Women of the Year (Note: Founded and organized by Richard Hiñola, it honors exceptional individuals based on their actions and contributions in the Philippines.)	2023	Empowered Teen Star – Multimedia Heartthrob	
TAG Media Chicago	2025	TAG 25 Under 25 (Note: It recognizes 25 prominent personalities, aged 25 and below, who have served as the "movers and shakers" of this generation.)	

=== Listicles ===
Name of publisher, year listed, name of listicle and placement
Publisher	Year	Listicle	Placement	Ref.
Inquirer	2026	Stars to watch out for in 2026	Included	
Manila Standard	2025	People of 2025	Included	
PEP	2024	Best Bets 2024: The Next Big Thing	Included	
Push	2025	Breakout Stars of 2025	Included	
The Philippine Star Life	2025	A to Z of 2025: Breakout Stars	Included	
