= Metro Manila Film Festival Award for Best Screenplay =

Annual Philippine film award

- Awarded for: Best Script/Writing
- Country: Philippines
- Presented by: MMDA
- First award: 1975
- Currently held by: Chris Martinez and Therese Cayaba, Unmarry (2025)
- Website: www.mmda.gov.ph/mmff/

The Metro Manila Film Festival Award for Best Screenplay is an award presented annually by the Metropolitan Manila Development Authority (MMDA). It was first awarded at the 1st Metro Manila Film Festival ceremony, held in 1975; Luciano Carlos received the award for his script in Batu-Bato sa Langit and it is given in honor of a scriptwriter with best script while working within the film industry. Currently, nominees and winners are determined by Executive Committees, headed by the Metropolitan Manila Development Authority Chairman and key members of the film industry.

== Winners and nominees ==
=== 1970s ===
Year	Film	Screenwriter(s)	Ref
1975 (1st)	Batu-Bato sa Langit	Luciano Carlos	
1976 (2nd)	Ganito Kami Noon, Paano Kayo Ngayon	Eddie Romero & Roy Iglesias	
1977 (3rd)	Burlesk Queen	Mauro Gia Samonte	
1978 (4th)	Rubia Servios	Mario O'Hara	
1979 (5th)	None (Note: No "Best Screenplay" announced.)		

=== 1980s ===
Year	Film	Screenwriter(s)	Ref
1980 (6th)	Taga sa Panahon	Jose N. Carreon	
1981 (7th)	Kisapmata	Clodualdo del Mundo, Jr., Raquel Villavicencio, and Mike De Leon	
1982 (8th)	Moral	Ricky Lee	
1983 (9th)	Bago Kumalat ang Kamandag	Willy Milan and Ronnie Paredes	
1984 (10th)	Bulaklak sa City Jail	Lualhati Bautista	
1985 (11th)	Moises Padilla Story: The Missing Chapter	Tom Adrales	
1986 (12th)	None		
1987 (13th)	Olongapo, The Great American Dream	Frank Vrechek, Alan Cummings, and Ricardo Lee	
1988 (14th)	Celestina Sanchez, Alyas Bubbles/ Enforcer: Ativan Gang	Carlo J. Caparas and Tony Mortel	
1989 (15th)	Imortal	Orlando Nadres	

=== 1990s ===
Year	Film	Screenwriter(s)	Ref
1990 (16th)	Andrea, Paano Ba ang Maging Isang Ina?	Ricky Lee and Gil Portes	
1991 (17th)	Ang Totoong Buhay ni Pacita M.	Ricky Lee	
1992 (18th)	Takbo, Talon, Tili	Ricky Lee and Jose Bartolone	
1993 (19th)	May Minamahal	Jose Javier Reyes	
1994 (20th)	None (Note: Many awards were not given including the "Best Screenplay" category.)		
1995 (21st)	Muling Umawit ang Puso	Ricky Lee	
1996 (22nd)	Magic Temple	Peque Gallaga, Lore Reyes and Erik Matti	
1997 (23rd)	Nasaan ang Puso?	Roy Iglesias	
1998 (24th)	José Rizal	Ricky Lee, Jun Lana, and Peter Ong Lim	
1999 (25th)	Muro Ami	Ricky Lee and Jun Lana	

=== 2000s ===
Year	Film	Screenwriter(s)	Ref
2000 (26th)	Tanging Yaman	Shaira Mella Salvador, Raymond Lee and Laurice Guillen	
2001 (27th)	Yamashita: The Tiger's Treasure	Roy Iglesias and Chito Rono	
2002 (28th)	Mano Po	Roy C. Iglesias	
2003 (29th)	Filipinas	Roy C. Iglesias	
2004 (30th)	Panaghoy sa Suba	Cris Vertido	
2005 (31st)	Blue Moon	Allan Tijamo	
2006 (32nd)	Kasal, Kasali, Kasalo	Jose Javier Reyes	
2007 (33rd)	Katas ng Saudi	Jose Javier Reyes	
2008 (34th)	Baler	Roy Iglesias	
2009 (35th)	Mano Po 6: A Mother's Love	Roy Iglesias	

=== 2010s ===
Year	Film	Screenwriter(s)	Ref
2010 (36th)	Ang Tanging Ina Mo (Last na 'To!)	Mel del Rosario	
2011 (37th)	Manila Kingpin: The Asiong Salonga Story	Roy Iglesias	
2012 (38th)	One More Try	Anna Karenina and Jay Gazmin	
2013 (39th)	10,000 Hours	Ryllah Epifania Berico and Keiko Aquino	
2014 (40th)	English Only, Please	Antoinette Jadaone and Anj Pessumal	
2015 (41st)	#Walang Forever	Paul Sta. Ana	
2015 (41st)	Honor Thy Father	Michiko Yamamoto	
2015 (41st)	My Bebe Love: #KiligPaMore	Jose Javier Reyes	
2016 (42nd)	Seklusyon	Anton C. Santamaria	
2017 (43rd)	All of You	Carl Chavez, Dan Villegas and Mae Chua	
2018 (44th)	Rainbow's Sunset	Eric Ramos	
2019 (45th)	Write About Love	Crisanto B. Aquino	
2019 (45th)	Mindanao	Honee Alipio	
2019 (45th)	Sunod	Anton Santamaria	

=== 2020s ===
Year	Film	Screenwriter(s)	Ref
2020 (46th)	Fan Girl	Antoinette Jadaone	
2020 (46th)	The Boy Foretold by the Stars	Dolly Dulu	
2020 (46th)	The Missing	Easy Ferrer	
2020 (46th)	Tagpuan	Ricardo Lee	
2020 (46th)	Coming Home	Gina Marisa Tagasa	
2021 (47th)	Big Night!	Jun Lana	
2022 (48th)	Mamasapano: Now It Can Be Told	Eric Ramos	
2022 (48th)	Nanahimik ang Gabi	Shugo Praico	
2022 (48th)	My Teacher	Toni Gonzaga	
2022 (48th)	My Father, Myself	Quinn Carillo	
2023 (49th)	Firefly	Angeli Atienza	
2023 (49th)	GomBurZa	Rodolfo Vera and Pepe Diokno	
2023 (49th)	Kampon	Dodo Dayao	
2023 (49th)	Mallari	Jun Lana	
2023 (49th)	When I Met You In Tokyo	Suzette Doctolero	
2024 (50th)	Green Bones	Ricky Lee and Angeli Atienza	
2024 (50th)	Espantaho	Chris Martinez	
2024 (50th)	Isang Himala	Ricky Lee and Pepe Diokno	
2024 (50th)	My Future You	Crisanto Aquino	
2024 (50th)	The Kingdom	Michelle Ngu-Nario	
2025 (51st)	Unmarry	Chris Martinez and Therese Cayaba	
2025 (51st)	Bar Boys: After School	Kip Oebanda, Carlo Catu and Zig Dulay	
2025 (51st)	Call Me Mother	Jun Lana, Daniel Saniana and Daisy Cayanan	
2025 (51st)	Manila's Finest	Moira Lang, Sherad Anthony Sanchez and Michiko Yamamoto	
2025 (51st)	I'mPerfect	Sigrid Andrea Bernardo	

== Multiple awards for Best Screenplay ==
Throughout the history of Metro Manila Film Festival (MMFF), there have been scriptwriters who received multiple Awards for Best Screenplay. As of 2015 (41st MMFF), 4 scriptwriters have received two or more Best Screenplay awards.

Scriptwriter	Record Set	First year awarded	Recent year awarded
Ricky Lee	9	1982	2024
Roy Iglesias	8	1976	2011
Jose Javier Reyes	3	1993	2007
Jun Lana	3	1998	2021
Antoinette Jadaone	2	2014	2020
Eric Ramos	2	2018	2022
Angeli Atienza	2	2023	2024
