= Manila's Finest (2025 film) =

2025 crime thriller film by Raymond Red

- Theatrical release poster
- Directed by: Raymond Red
- Written by: Michiko Yamamoto; Moira Lang; Sherad Anthony Sanchez
- Produced by: Peter Edward G. Dizon; Moira Lang; Piolo Pascual; Erickson Raymundo; Joyce Bernal; Jeffrey Vadillo
- Starring: Piolo Pascual; Enrique Gil
- Cinematography: Raymond Red
- Edited by: Jay Halili; Noe Paguiligan
- Music by: Fred Sandoval; Emerzon Texon
- Production company: Cignal TV; MQuest Ventures; Spring Films
- Distributed by: Viva Films
- Release date: December 25, 2025
- Running time: 119 minutes
- Country: Philippines
- Language: Filipino
- Box office: ₱17 million

Manila's Finest is a 2025 Philippine period crime thriller film directed and photographed by Raymond Red from a screenplay written by Michiko Yamamoto, Moira Lang, and Sherad Anthony Sanchez.

Produced by Cignal TV, MQuest Ventures and Spring Films, the film was released theatrically on December 25, 2025, as part of the 51st Metro Manila Film Festival.

== Plot ==
In 1969, the Manila Police District (MPD) struggles to maintain law and order in the city amid an interservice rivalry with the Philippine Constabulary Metropolitan Command (MetroCom). At MPD Station 4, a stern but honest Colonel Belarmino manages a staff that includes veteran family man Homer and his rookie partner, Billy.

Homer investigates a series of killings initially believed to be part of a gang war, but after speaking with rival gang members, finds that the killings were perpetrated by outside individuals. Homer's squad breaks up a fight between the gangs and arrest those involved, only for them to be released by MetroCom officers led by Danilo, who takes over the investigation into the case and removes the relevant files from the MPD. Danilo later calls Station 4 for back-up in dealing with antigovernment protesters in Mendiola. At the scene, Homer sees a suspicious individual agitating the protesters to attack the police, causing a scuffle that ends with Billy inadvertently beating a protester to death and Homer discovering that his daughter, Agnes, was also at the event. After the rally is dispersed, Homer comforts Agnes, who despairs over a friend who went missing during the rally, and accepts that she has different political views. Meanwhile, Walter, a journalist who covered the gang killings, warns Homer that the government is planning to declare martial law and is staging acts of violence to justify its imposition.

Homer comes across the mysterious agitator at a suspected arson site and manages to note down his car's license plate. Homer's attempts to find the driver catch the attention of Danilo, who warns him to back down and blackmails Homer with images of his meetings with gangsters and a prostitute, Janette. Homer comes clean to Belarmino, who concurs with his suspicion that the MetroCom and the government is somehow involved and promises to investigate. The next day, Janette summons Homer to a hotel, where he comes across Belarmino lying dead in bed after suffering a heart attack during a tryst with Janet. Homer breaks the news to Station 4, but hides the circumstances behind Belarmino's death.

Belarmino is replaced as station commander by a corrupt officer, Javier, who hinders Homer's investigations in favor of MetroCom and purges the station by reassigning most of Homer's colleagues and recruiting common criminals to the police force. Searching through Belarmino's files, Homer finds the name of the agitator, Carmelo, and arrests him with Billy's help, only for Carmelo to be released by Danilo. Danilo also arranges for the murder charges filed against Billy over the protest to be dropped, causing the latter to gravitate towards MetroCom. At another rally, Homer is badly beaten by Camilo as Billy looks on. Afterwards, Homer confronts Billy, who cynically says the MPD is obsolete and joins the MetroCom. A worn-out Homer meets with Agnes, who tells him that her missing friend is dead and that her faith in the police force is wavering. After Agnes leaves, Homer ponders resigning but decides against it. As Homer steps out, he collapses in front of the station from exhaustion and dies in Billy's arms.

Sometime later, a now-hardened Billy and his partners are on patrol duty when they apprehend a girl breaking curfew. When his colleagues proceed to molest her, Billy crashes their patrol car into a gasoline station and tells the girl to run away before walking out in frustration. As he approaches a restaurant, he sees Danilo inviting him inside to dine with Carmelo, but Billy moves away in disgust.

== Cast ==
=== Main Cast ===
- Piolo Pascual as Capt. Homer Magtibay, an experienced police officer in Manila. Pascual researched on life of being a police officer in the 1960s as part of his preparation for the role.

=== Supporting Cast ===
- Enrique Gil as 1st Lt. Billy Ojeda, a young police officer who is Magtibay's partner in the profession.
- Ashtine Olviga as Agnes Magtibay, Homer's daughter.
- Kiko Estrada as Carmelo de Leon
- Cedrick Juan as Officer Danilo Abad
- Romnick Sarmenta as Superintendent Severino Meneses
- Joey Marquez as Officer Regelio Liwanag
- Dylan Menor as Officer Efren Taguyunon
- Ethan David as Cecilio Mendiola
- Soliman Cruz as Walter
- Ariel Rivera as Col. Conrad Belarmino
- Rica Peralejo as Yoly Matibay; Homer's wife and Agnes's mother. This marks Peralejo’s return to acting after a long hiatus.
- Rico Blanco as Epifanio Javier
- Jasmine Curtis-Smith as Janette
- Paulo Angeles as Reman
- Inday Fatima as Betty
- Pearl Gonzales as Stella Javier, Epifanio's wife

== Production ==
Manila's Finest was produced under Cignal TV, MQuest Ventures and Spring Films. It was written by Michiko Yamamoto, Moira Lang, and Sherad Anthony Sanchez. The film was submitted as a script for the 51st Metro Manila Film Festival. Rae Red was supposed to direct the film but withdrew before pre-production due to personal reasons. Instead, her uncle Raymond Red took over the role.

Principal photography for the film began in October 2025. It was produced to promote appreciation for the police force.

== Release ==
Manila's Finest was released on December 25, 2025, in cinemas in the Philippines, as one of the official eight entries of the 51st Metro Manila Film Festival.

The film was showcased in the Southeast Asian Frontiers section of the 25th New York Asian Film Festival on 22 July 2026 and had its International Premiere.

== Accolades ==
Accolades received by Manila's Finest
Award	Date of ceremony	Category	Recipient(s)	Result	Ref.
2025 Metro Manila Film Festival	December 27, 2025	Best Picture	Manila's Finest	3rd (Note: Tied with Call Me Mother.)	
2025 Metro Manila Film Festival	December 27, 2025	Best Director	Raymond Red	Nominated	
2025 Metro Manila Film Festival	December 27, 2025	Best Actor	Piolo Pascual	Nominated	
2025 Metro Manila Film Festival	December 27, 2025	Best Supporting Actor	Cedrick Juan	Nominated	
2025 Metro Manila Film Festival	December 27, 2025	Best Supporting Actress	Ashtine Olviga	Nominated	
2025 Metro Manila Film Festival	December 27, 2025	Best Screenplay	Moira Lang, Sherad Anthony Sanchez and Michiko Yamamoto	Nominated	
2025 Metro Manila Film Festival	December 27, 2025	Best Cinematography	Raymond Red	Won	
2025 Metro Manila Film Festival	December 27, 2025	Best Production Design	Digo Ricio	Won	
2025 Metro Manila Film Festival	December 27, 2025	Best Editing	Jay Halili, Noe Paguiligan	Nominated	
2025 Metro Manila Film Festival	December 27, 2025	Best Sound	Roy Santos	Won	
2025 Metro Manila Film Festival	December 27, 2025	Best Original Theme Song	"Sandalan" — Vehnee Saturno	Won	
2025 Metro Manila Film Festival	December 27, 2025	Best Musical Score	Frederik Sandoval, Emerzon Texon	Won	
2025 Metro Manila Film Festival	December 27, 2025	Best Visual Effects	Eoplus, Inc.	Nominated	
2025 Metro Manila Film Festival	December 27, 2025	Best Float	Manila's Finest	Won (Note: Tied with Unmarry.)	
2025 Metro Manila Film Festival	December 27, 2025	Gatpuno Antonio J. Villegas Cultural Award	Manila's Finest	Won	
