= Shake, Rattle & Roll: Evil Origins =

2025 Filipino film

- Theatrical release poster
- Directed by: Shugo Praico (segment "1775"); Joey de Guzman (segment "2025"); Ian Loreños (segment "2050")
- Screenplay by: Alex Castor (segment "1775"); Noreen Capili (segments "1775" & "2050"); Onay Sales-Camero (segment "2025"); John Paul E. Abellera (segment "2025"); Gina Marissa Tagasa (segment "2050")
- Story by: John Paul E. Abellera; Alex Castor; Onay Sales-Camero; Gina Marissa Tagasa
- Produced by: Roselle Monteverde; Keith Monteverde Teo
- Starring: Richard Gutierrez; Carla Abellana; Ivana Alawi; Loisa Andalio; Francine Diaz; Seth Fedelin; Ysabel Ortega; Ashley Ortega; Dustin Yu; Fyang Smith; JM Ibarra; Manilyn Reynes; Janice de Belen
- Cinematography: Moises M. M. Zee (segment "1775"); Mark Joshua Tirona (segment "2025"); Rommel Andreo Sales (segment "2050")
- Edited by: John Paul Somera Ponce (segment "1775"); Joey de Guzman (segment "2025"); Kurt Claridades (segment "2050")
- Music by: Jose Antonio Buencamino (segment "1775"); Mikhail Ali Hooshmand (segment "2025"); Paulo Almaden (segment "2050")
- Production company: Regal Entertainment
- Distributed by: Regal Films Distribution Co. Ltd.
- Release date: December 25, 2025
- Running time: 146 minutes
- Country: Philippines
- Language: Filipino

Shake, Rattle & Roll: Evil Origins (also known as Shake, Rattle & Roll XVII or Shake, Rattle & Roll 17) is a 2025 Filipino horror anthology film produced by Regal Entertainment, and the seventeenth installment of the Shake, Rattle & Roll film series. The film was directed by Shugo Praico, Joey de Guzman, and Ian Loreños. The plot revolves on different time periods in each segment; past ("1775"), present ("2025"), and future ("2050"). The film is an official entry to the 51st Metro Manila Film Festival, after the previous installment was not included in the 2023 edition.

The film consists of three interconnected segments: nuns confront an evil entity in a Spanish-era convent; a group of friends become trapped in a murderous Halloween masquerade ball; and survivors battle an aswang-infested post-apocalyptic Philippines.

The film was released for streaming on Netflix on July 30, 2026.

== Plot ==
=== "1775" ===
Four novice nuns: Flor, Salve, Ana and Rita, enter a convent headed by the tyrannical Mother Superior, Juana. Flor, who is secretly pregnant, attempts to find her older sister Clara, who is also a nun at the same convent, but is blocked by Juana, who had Clara locked up after she began having visions of a demon arriving on the premises.

A mysterious chest arrives at the convent from a shipwrecked galleon. One of the nuns, Piedad, inspects the chest at a storeroom, but a sinister voice tells her to open it. She is tempted upon seeing luxurious clothes and jewelry inside and tries them on, but then finds that she is actually stabbing herself as a malevolent figure emerges and kills her. Her corpse is found by another nun, Josefa, and Juana, who orders a coverup but is haunted afterwards by the same entity. Salve, Ana and Flor later stumble upon the graves of Piedad and other nuns who died suspiciously. They are caught by Juana, who orders them to self-flagellate in front of Rita. A shaken Rita prays at the chapel, but is then lured to her death by an angel who turns out to be a demon that sends her falling off the belfry.

That night, the entity terrorizes the convent, killing most of the occupants. Ana is lured to a feast and indulges herself, only to end up impaling her head on an animal horn. Flor finally finds Clara, who tells her the entity is a bloodthirsty demon named Malum who had been sealed inside the chest by their ancestors in Mexico. They are attacked by a possessed Juana, who whips Josefa to death and strangles Salve before flagellating herself to death. As Flor and Clara try to escape, they are attacked by Malum, but Clara holds him off and tells Flor to leave, revealing that she knows about her pregnancy, before sealing the chest as the convent collapses. As Flor flees, she looks back as Malum beckons.

=== "2025" ===
Pickpockets Sky and Faye infiltrate a Halloween rave party at the Hellclipse club, assisted by Faye's parents Bano and Malena, who work as staff. Sky and Faye get involved in a brawl with partygoers Sean, James, Callie, Ice and siblings Marco and Pia, resulting in all eight being held in a locker room. As the resident DJ, Nyxx, leaves at the end of her shift, she is killed by a group of hooded ghouls revealed to be part of a cult worshipping Malum, whose chest is being stored in the club. The cult then proceeds to slaughter the attendees and the staff, including Bano, leaving Malena and the replacement DJ, Elle, as the only survivors.

Unaware of the massacre, Sky and Faye pick the locker room's door to escape; they are met by Elle, whose warnings about the carnage are ignored until Ice is fatally struck with a pickaxe by a cultist. The group splits in panic, with Marco and Pia being found and killed. The remaining partygoers are reunited with Malena. The group proposes to restart the club's electricity to open the elevator leading to the exit. Sean volunteers to distract the cultists while James and Elle restart the main power switch. James is killed while protecting Elle, who manages to restart the switch. As Faye stumbles upon Malum's chest, which is surrounded by victims of a ritual sacrifice, Callie fatally stabs Sky, revealing herself as a cultist. As Faye and Sean escape, Callie attacks the two, leading to Sean hanging on the handrail. Just as when Callie is about to kill Faye with the knife, it is revealed that Faye had stolen Callie's knife earlier. Faye stabbed Callie two times and pulled Sean up back to safety. Both of them fled to the elevator.

At the elevator, Faye and Sean are met again by Callie, who is holding Malena hostage. Callie prepares to kill the three when she is again knocked down by Elle, disguised as a cultist. As the four make their escape, Callie warns that Malum is unstoppable as she laughs hysterically. At the dancefloor, an unseen figure retrieves a rosary lost by Faye during her struggle with Callie.

=== "2050" ===
Following the Hellclipse massacre, the Philippines is overrun by aswangs led by Malum. An elderly Malena hides in a booby-trapped apartment with her orphaned nephews Rosdan and Riel, and siblings Dong and Drea. Rosdan is haunted by nightmares of his wife Mia, who was killed in front of him by an aswang.

Another survivor, Edris, enters the apartment seeking Malena. Edris shows Faye's rosary, revealing herself to be the child of cultists who were at the massacre but were later killed when they tried to defect. Malena has a vision of Malum's origins and her ancestors, revealed to be Clara and Flor, telling her that only their lineage can seal Malum's chest and end his terror. Shortly after, the apartment is attacked by aswangs including Callie, who is killed by a booby trap. As Edris and Malena's family escape, Malena stays behind and entrusts the rosary to Rosdan before killing herself and the other aswangs by igniting the apartment's fuel supplies.

Edris reveals that Malum's chest remains at the Hellclipse site. They rest at a survivors' camp on their way to close the chest, but are ambushed by Malum and his minions, who decimate the camp and kill Dong and Drea. The aswangs attack Rosdan and Riel, but become weakened when they come into contact with the duo's blood. Riel sacrifices himself and is impaled by Malum, who is weakened by Riel's blood. This allows Rosdan to strike a final blow against Malum, killing him and the other aswangs. Rosdan mourns Riel before setting off with Edris to seal Malum's chest.

In a mid-credits scene, a swarm of bloody hands emerge from Malum’s chest.

== Cast ==
- Jerome Philip Canseco (1775 & 2025) / Carlo Tarobal (2050) as Malum

=== 1775 ===
- Carla Abellana as Madre Clara
- Loisa Andalio as Hermana Flor
- Janice de Belen as Madre Juana
- Ysabel Ortega as Hermana Rita
- Ashley Ortega as Hermana Salve
- Elijah Alejo as Hermana Ana
- Arlene Muhlach as Madre Josefa
- Ara Mina as Madre Piedad
- Monina Lawrence as Madre Rosa
- Ara Davao as Angel/Demon

=== 2025 ===
- Francine Diaz as Faye
- Seth Fedelin as Sean
- Fyang Smith as DJ Elle
- JM Ibarra as James
- Manilyn Reynes as Malena
- Alex Calleja as Bano
- Kaila Estrada as DJ Nyxx
- Sassa Gurl as Sky
- Karina Bautista as Callie
- Althea Ablan as Pia
- Dylan Yturralde as Marco
- Arkin Lagman as Ice
- Angelica Lao as Vexa
- Shecko Apostol as Dravo
- Raven Rigor as Bomen

=== 2050 ===
- Richard Gutierrez as Rosdan
- Ivana Alawi as Edris
- Manilyn Reynes as Malena
- Dustin Yu as Riel
- Matt Lozano as Dong
- Celyn David as Drea
- Sarah Edwards as Mia
- Karina Bautista as Callie
- Angelica Lao as Vexa
- Shecko Apostol as Dravo
- Raven Rigor as Bomen
- Francis Mata as Mang Isko

== Production ==
The "2050" segment of Shake, Rattle & Roll: Evil Origins marked Richard Gutierrez's return to Regal Films, having done films for the production outfit in his early career. This is also the first time for him to be paired with Ivana Alawi. Ryan Bang was also supposed to be part of the cast but due to scheduling conflicts, Bang was replaced by Lozano. Regal Films released a statement in October 2025, that the production for Evil Origins proceeded "smoothly and wrapped on schedule" in response to rumors that Alawi caused delays in production. The production studio called the allegation "entirely untrue".

== Release ==
The film was released on December 25, 2025, as part of the 2025 Metro Manila Film Festival.

== Reception ==
=== Box office ===
Shake, Rattle & Roll: Evil Origins reportedly grossed ₱16 million on its opening day at the Philippine box office.

=== Accolades ===
Accolades received by Shake, Rattle & Roll: Evil Origins
| Award | Date of ceremony | Category | Recipient(s) | Result | Ref. |
|---|---|---|---|---|---|
| 2025 Metro Manila Film Festival | December 27, 2025 | Best Cinematography | Moises M. Zee (1775), Mark Joshua Tirona (2025), Rommel Andreo Sales (2050) | Nominated | |
| 2025 Metro Manila Film Festival | December 27, 2025 | Best Production Design | Leo Velasco Jr. (2050) | Nominated | |
| 2025 Metro Manila Film Festival | December 27, 2025 | Best Sound | Ditoy Aguila | Nominated | |
| 2025 Metro Manila Film Festival | December 27, 2025 | Best Original Theme Song | "Balak sa Dilim" — Mikhail Ali Hooshmand | Nominated | |
| 2025 Metro Manila Film Festival | December 27, 2025 | Best Original Theme Song | "Dugo" — Paulo Almaden | Nominated | |
| 2025 Metro Manila Film Festival | December 27, 2025 | Best Musical Score | Jose Antonio Buencamino (1775), Mikhail Ali Hooshmand (2025), Paulo Almaden (2050) | Nominated | |
| 2025 Metro Manila Film Festival | December 27, 2025 | Best Visual Effects | Santelmo Inc. | Won | |
| 2025 Metro Manila Film Festival | December 27, 2025 | Best Float | Shake, Rattle & Roll: Evil Origins | Nominated | |

== See also ==
- List of ghost films
