= I'mPerfect =

2025 Philippine romance film

- Theatrical release poster
- Directed by: Sigrid Andrea Bernardo
- Written by: Sigrid Andrea Bernardo
- Produced by: Jaime Baltazar; Victoria Lorna Fernandez
- Starring: Earl Amaba; Krystel Go
- Cinematography: Boy Yñiguez
- Edited by: Maryo Ignacio
- Music by: Len Calvo
- Production company: Nathan Studios
- Release date: December 25, 2025
- Running time: 131 minutes
- Country: Philippines
- Language: Filipino
- Box office: ₱21 million

I'mPerfect, sometimes written as I'm Perfect, is a 2025 Philippine romance film written and directed by Sigrid Andrea Bernardo. The film revolves around the romantic relationship of two adults with Down syndrome. Starring Krystel Go and Earl Amaba, who have Down syndrome themselves, in the lead roles, it features a supporting cast including Sylvia Sanchez, Janice de Belen, Joey Marquez, Lorna Tolentino (who also served as a producer), Tonton Gutierrez, and Zaijian Jaranilla.

Produced by Nathan Studios, the film released theatrically on December 25, 2025, as one of the entries at the 51st Metro Manila Film Festival.

== Plot ==
The film follows a romantic relationship between Jiro and Jessica who were falling in love with each other and striving for independence despite societal limitations.

Jessica is a 27 year old woman with Down syndrome and studies at the school for special children and works as a waitress in the cafe. She later meets a new student, a 28 year old named Jiro at her school she was currently attending and like she is, he had Down syndrome and was very attracted to Jessica, leading them to fall in love with each other. Jessica is revealed to live with her mother Norma and was visited by her estranged father Arman who wanted to apologize both of them for not being with them because in the past he couldn't take responsibilities over Jessica when she was born with Down syndrome as an infant. Jiro however lives in the wealthy family of doctors, his parents are Lizel and Dan and was very close to his younger brother Ryan who wanted to become a musician instead of following the footsteps of their parents which angers Lizel from his decision.

When Jiro learns that they are about to go to the United States for his medicinal needs, he decided to leave home to be with Jessica and both decided to leave school to go to the province with the help of their friends who also made up a wedding between them. Their leave without their knowledge causing both families to team up to find them. It is revealed that Jiro and Jessica lives in the secluded hut owned by his former yaya Claring who was previously fired by Lizel and this is how they learned to live a good life together and they consummate their relationship. Claring eventually calls Lizel to inform both of them of their current whereabouts.

With the reunion of their respective families, they finally realized their decision to live independent and allowing both of them to live together. Following after this, Jessica was sick from cold and Jiro was willing to take her to the hospital which she refused and both stayed at the hill the next day to see the nice view until Jessica died in his arms after seeing her from his dream that they are flying together without wings and to Jiro's grief and sadness over losing her. Jiro was last seen continuing on working to cut off the roses and was watched over by Jessica as a spirit.

== Cast ==
- Earl Amaba as Jiro Perez
- Krystel Go as Jessica
- Sylvia Sanchez as Norma, Jessica's mother
- Janice de Belen as Yaya Claring
- Joey Marquez as Arman, Jessica's father
- Lorna Tolentino as Lizel Perez, Jiro's mother
- Tonton Gutierrez as Dan Perez, Jiro’s father
- Zaijian Jaranilla as Ryan Perez, Jiro's younger brother

Additional actors play Jiro and Jessica's friends, all of which have Down syndrome: Royce Gian Rivera (as Royce), Bea Mendoza, Richelle Uy, Gio Dicen, Jonathan Tilos, Javi Sarmiento, Carl Garcia, and Angela Batallones. Mendoza was originally cast as Jessica, but the male lead actor died before filming would commence.

== Production ==
I'mPerfect was directed by Sigrid Bernardo under Nathan Studios. The story features romance between two people with Down Syndrome. Bernardo started first thought of the story back in 2009, when she was still starting her career as a filmmaker. She immersed with people with Down syndrome as a director of a fashion show. Bernardo late wrote the script for ImPerfect in 2014.

Her team won a competition hosted by the Film Development Council of the Philippines enabling Bernardo to produce a teaser to pitch to producers. The teaser video for an earlier version for I'mPerfect released in 2017 under VYAC Productions. Andie Cruz as Jiro and Bea Angela Mendoza portrayed the roles of Jiro and Jessica in the trailer. Bernardo claimed that a lot of producers liked the concept for the film but none committed to funding it.

The story for I'mPerfect was completed in 2018. Its production was disrupted by the COVID-19 pandemic.

Nathan Studios adopted the project in 2024. Audition process for the film lasted from October to December 2024 with the selected actors undergoing a three-month workshop before principal photography began. Filming was conducted in various locations in Mindanao, including Nasipit, Agusan del Norte, and Claveria, Misamis Oriental.

The production team coordinated with Down Syndrome Association of the Philippines, Best Buddies Philippines, and the Special Olympics Pilipinas in an effort to be able to depict people with Down syndrome accurately.

== Release ==
I'mPerfect was released on December 25 in cinemas in the Philippines as one of the official eight entries of the 2025 Metro Manila Film Festival.

== Reception ==
=== Accolades ===
Accolades received by I'mPerfect
Award	Date of ceremony	Category	Recipient(s)	Result	Ref.
2025 Metro Manila Film Festival	December 27, 2025	Best Picture	I'mPerfect	Won	
2025 Metro Manila Film Festival	December 27, 2025	Best Director	Sigrid Andrea Bernardo	Nominated	
2025 Metro Manila Film Festival	December 27, 2025	Best Actor	Earl Amaba	Nominated	
2025 Metro Manila Film Festival	December 27, 2025	Best Actress	Krystel Go	Won	
2025 Metro Manila Film Festival	December 27, 2025	Best Supporting Actor	Joey Marquez	Nominated	
2025 Metro Manila Film Festival	December 27, 2025	Best Supporting Actor	Zaijian Jaranilla	Nominated	
2025 Metro Manila Film Festival	December 27, 2025	Best Supporting Actress	Janice de Belen	Nominated	
2025 Metro Manila Film Festival	December 27, 2025	Best Supporting Actress	Sylvia Sanchez	Nominated	
2025 Metro Manila Film Festival	December 27, 2025	Best Screenplay	Sigrid Andrea Bernardo	Nominated	
2025 Metro Manila Film Festival	December 27, 2025	Best Editing	Marya Ignacio	Nominated	
2025 Metro Manila Film Festival	December 27, 2025	Best Sound	Mark Locsin	Nominated	
2025 Metro Manila Film Festival	December 27, 2025	Best Visual Effects	Mylav Infante	Nominated	
2025 Metro Manila Film Festival	December 27, 2025	Best Float	I'mPerfect	Nominated	
2025 Metro Manila Film Festival	December 27, 2025	Best Ensemble	I'mPerfect	Won	
2026 7th VP Choice Awards	January 23, 2026	Supporting Movie Actor of the Year	Zaijian Jaranilla	Nominated	
