= 1984 Metro Manila Film Festival =

Film festival edition

- Date: December 25, 1984 to January 3, 1985
- Site: Manila

Highlights
- Best Picture: Bulaklak sa City Jail
- Most awards: Bulaklak sa City Jail (6)

Television coverage
- Network: MBS

The 10th Metro Manila Film Festival was held in 1984.

Cherubim Films' Bulaklak sa City Jail won most of the awards including the Best Picture Award, Best Actress for Nora Aunor and Best Director for Mario O'Hara among others.

A total of nine entries participated in the festival, which saw the debut of the Shake, Rattle and Roll film series. FPJ Productions' Ang Panday IV: Ika-Apat Na Aklat was the festival's top grosser, earning ₱7.2 million in total; all nine entries grossed a combined ₱27 million.

== Entries ==
Title	Starring	Studio	Director	Genre
Alapaap	William Martinez, Mark Gil, Michael de Mesa, Tanya Gomez, Eva Rose Palma, Isadora	Oro Vista Motion Pictures	Tata Esteban	Drama, Horror, Thriller
Atsay Killer: Buti Nga Sa'yo	Eddie Garcia, Panchito, Cachupoy, Fauzi Omar, Isabel Rivas, Barbara Luna, Julie Ann Fortich, Donna Villa, Rosemarie de Vera	Sittis Films	Angel Labra	Comedy
Bukas... May Pangarap	Gina Alajar, Tommy Abuel, Dante Balaois, Michael Baluyot, Richard Baluyot, Thea Cleofe Salvador, Bes Flores, Ruben Rustia, Bebong Osorio, Josie Galvez	Tri-Films	Gil Portes	Drama
Bulaklak sa City Jail	Nora Aunor, Gina Alajar, Celia Rodriguez, Perla Bautista, Maya Valdez, Zenaida Amador, Maritess Gutierrez, Shyr Valdez	Cherubim Films	Mario O'Hara	Crime, Drama
Idol	Rudy Fernandez, Connie Angeles, Chuckie Dreyfuss, Dencio Padilla, Ruben Rustia, Victor Bravo, Dick Israel, Robert Talabis, Philip Gamboa, Bomber Moran, Rommel Valdez	Bukang Liwayway Films	Romy Suzara	Action
Misteryo sa Tuwa	Tony Santos, Sr., Johnny Delgado, Ronnie Lazaro, Alicia Alonzo, Lito Anzures, Amable Quiambao, Mario Montes	Experimental Cinema of the Philippines	Abbo Q. dela Cruz	Action
Muntinlupa	Anthony Alonzo, Marianne dela Riva, Fred Montilla, Tita Muñoz, Alicia Alonzo, Max Alvarado, Joonee Gamboa, Renato del Prado, Rodolfo 'Boy' Garcia	Triple A Films	Jose Antonio Alonzo	Drama, Thriller
Ang Panday IV: Ika-Apat Na Aklat	Fernando Poe, Jr., Marianne dela Riva, Lito Anzures, Bentot, Jr., Eddie Infante, Mario Escudero, Robert Rivera, Max Alvarado	FPJ Productions	Ronwaldo Reyes	Fantasy, Action, Adventure
Shake, Rattle & Roll	Episode 1: "Baso" - Joel Torre, Rey "PJ" Abellana, Arlene Muhlach; Episode 2: "Pridyider" – Janice de Belen, Charito Solis, William Martinez, Mon Alvir, Lito Gruet; Episode 3: "Manananggal" - Herbert Bautista, Irma Alegre, Mary Walter, Peewee Quiajano, Pen Medina	Athena Productions	Emmanuel Borlaza; Ishmael Bernal; Peque Gallaga	Horror

== Winners and nominees ==
=== Awards ===
Winners are listed first and highlighted in boldface.

Best Film	Best Director
**Bulaklak sa City Jail**; Alapaap (2nd Best Picture); Shake, Rattle & Roll (3rd Best Picture); Misteryo Sa Tuwa; Atsay Killer: Buti Nga Sa 'Yo; Idol; Muntinlupa; Bukas...May Pangarap; Ang Panday IV: Ika-Apat na Aklat	Mario O'Hara – Bulaklak sa City Jail
Best Actor	Best Actress
**Herbert Bautista – Shake, Rattle & Roll**	Nora Aunor – Bulaklak sa City Jail
Best Supporting Actor	Best Supporting Actress
**Ed Villapol – Alapaap**	Celia Rodriguez – Bulaklak sa City Jail
Best Story	Best Cinematography
**Lualhati Bautista – Bulaklak sa City Jail**	Joe Tutanes – Alapaap
Best Editing	Best Music
**Jess Navarro – Shake, Rattle & Roll**	Jaime Fabregas – Shake, Rattle & Roll
Best Art Direction	Best Screenplay
**Joe Tutanes – Alapaap**	Lualhati Bautista – Bulaklak sa City Jail
Best Child Performer
**Chuckie Dreyfuss – Idol**

== Multiple awards ==
Awards	Film
6	Bulaklak sa City Jail
3	Shake, Rattle & Roll
3	Alapaap

Preceded by 1983 Metro Manila Film Festival	Metro Manila Film Festival; 1984	Succeeded by 1985 Metro Manila Film Festival
