= Unmarry =

- Theatrical release poster
- Directed by: Jeffrey Jeturian
- Screenplay by: Chris Martinez; Therese Cayaba
- Produced by: Patricia Y. Sumagui
- Starring: Angelica Panganiban; Zanjoe Marudo
- Cinematography: Kara Moreno
- Edited by: Benjo Ferrer
- Music by: Len Calvo
- Production company: Quantum Films; Cineko Productions
- Distributed by: Quantum Films
- Release date: December 25, 2025
- Running time: 130 minutes
- Country: Philippines
- Language: Filipino
- Box office: ₱57 million

Unmarry (stylized in all caps) is a 2025 Philippine drama film directed by Jeffrey Jeturian from a screenplay written by Chris Martinez and Therese Cayaba. Starring Angelica Panganiban and Zanjoe Marudo, the film revolves around a couple who separately process the dissolution of their marriage through annulment.

Produced by Quantum Films and Cineko Films, the film was theatrically released on December 25, 2025, as one of the official entries at the 51st Metro Manila Film Festival.

== Cast ==
Main cast

- Angelica Panganiban as Celine Santos
- Zanjoe Marudo as Ivan Castro

Supporting cast

- Eugene Domingo as Atty. Jacqueline Lambridas
- Tom Rodriguez as Stephen Alcaraz, Celine's former husband
- Solenn Heussaff as Maya Castro, Ivan's former wife
- Zac Sinag as Elio Castro, Ivan and Maya Castro's oldest son
- Donna Cariaga as Janice
- Shamaine Centenera-Buencamino as Amelia Santos, Celine's mother
- KaladKaren as Lizzie, Celine's best friend
- Adrienne Vergara
- Bryan Sy
- Johnny Revilla
- Raquel Villavicencio as Dr. Alcaraz, Stephen's mother
- Mari Kaimo
- Angel Aquino as Atty. Grace Agravante
- Nico Antonio as Atty. Willie Bautista
- Alejandra Cortez as Chloe Alcatraz, Celine Santos and Stephen Alcatraz's older daughter
- Britney Romero as Zoe Alcaraz, Celine Santos and Stephen Alcaraz's younger daughter

== Production ==
Unmarry was directed by Jeffrey Jeturian and was written by Chris Martinez and Therese Cayaba. The film was a co-production of Quantum Films at Cineko Films.

The story for the film was first conceptualized in 2022 and took three years to be finished. It is based on the experience of Josabeth Alonso, a lawyer by profession and one of the executive producers of the film, on handling annulment cases since the late 1980s.

== Release ==
Unmarry was released on December 25 in cinemas in the Philippines as one of the official eight entries of the 2025 Metro Manila Film Festival.

== Accolades ==
Accolades received by Unmarry
Award	Date of ceremony	Category	Recipient(s)	Result	Ref.
2025 Metro Manila Film Festival	December 27, 2025	Best Picture	Unmarry	2nd	
2025 Metro Manila Film Festival	December 27, 2025	Best Director	Jeffrey Jeturian	Won	
2025 Metro Manila Film Festival	December 27, 2025	Best Actor	Zanjoe Marudo	Nominated	
2025 Metro Manila Film Festival	December 27, 2025	Best Actress	Angelica Panganiban	Nominated	
2025 Metro Manila Film Festival	December 27, 2025	Best Supporting Actor	Zack Sibug	Nominated	
2025 Metro Manila Film Festival	December 27, 2025	Best Supporting Actor	Tom Rodriguez	Won	
2025 Metro Manila Film Festival	December 27, 2025	Best Supporting Actress	Eugene Domingo	Nominated	
2025 Metro Manila Film Festival	December 27, 2025	Best Supporting Actress	Solenn Heussaff	Nominated	
2025 Metro Manila Film Festival	December 27, 2025	Best Screenplay	Chris Martinez, Therese Cayaba	Won	
2025 Metro Manila Film Festival	December 27, 2025	Best Cinematography	Kara Moreno	Nominated	
2025 Metro Manila Film Festival	December 27, 2025	Best Editing	Benjo Ferrer	Won	
2025 Metro Manila Film Festival	December 27, 2025	Best Sound	Lamberto Casas Jr., Alex Tomboc	Nominated	
2025 Metro Manila Film Festival	December 27, 2025	Best Musical Score	Len Calvo	Nominated	
2025 Metro Manila Film Festival	December 27, 2025	Best Float	Unmarry	Won (Note: Tied with Manila's Finest.)	
2025 Metro Manila Film Festival	December 27, 2025	Most Gender-Sensitivity Award	Unmarry	Nominated	
2025 Metro Manila Film Festival	December 27, 2025	Best Breakthrough Performance	Zack Sibug	Won	
