= Metro Manila Film Festival Award for Best Float =

Annual film award

- Awarded for: Best float during the parade
- Country: Philippines
- Presented by: MMDA
- First award: 1992
- Currently held by: Manila's Finest and Unmarry (2025)
- Website: www.mmda.gov.ph/mmff/

The Metro Manila Film Festival Award for Best Float is an award presented annually by the Metropolitan Manila Development Authority (MMDA). It was first awarded at the 18th Metro Manila Film Festival ceremony, held in 1992; Okay Ka Fairy Ko! Part 2 won the award for their float during the parade and it is given to the motion picture team that demonstrates the best float during the parade. Currently, nominees and winners are determined by Executive Committees, headed by the Metropolitan Manila Development Authority Chairman and key members of the film industry.

== Winners and nominees ==
=== 1990s ===
Year	Film	Ref
1992 (18th)	Okay Ka Fairy Ko! Part 2	
1993 (19th)	May Minamahal	
1994 (20th)	Ang Pagbabalik ni Pedro Penduko	
1995 (21st)	Isko: Adventures in Animasia	
1996 (22nd)	Magic Temple	
1997 (23rd)	Magic Kingdom	
1998 (24th)	José Rizal	
1999 (25th)	Sa Piling Ng Mga Aswang	

=== 2000s ===
Year	Film	Ref
2000 (26th)	Spirit Warriors	
2001 (27th)	Yamashita: The Tiger's Treasure	
2002 (28th)	Ang Agimat: Antin-Anting ni Lolo	
2003 (29th)	Mano Po 2: My Home	
2004 (30th)	Mano Po III: My Love	
2005 (31st)	-	
2006 (32nd)	Tatlong Baraha	
2006 (32nd)	Mano Po 5: Gua Ai Di (1st Runner-up)	
2006 (32nd)	Kasal, Kasali, Kasalo (2nd Runner-up)	
2007 (33rd)	Resiklo	
2008 (34th)	-	
2009 (35th)	-	

=== 2010s ===
Year	Film	Ref
2010 (36th)	Rosario	
2011 (37th)	Ang Panday 2	
2011 (37th)	Manila Kingpin: The Asiong Salonga Story (1st runner-up)	
2011 (37th)	Enteng Ng Ina Mo (2nd runner-up)	
2012 (38th)	El Presidente	
2013 (39th)	Boy Golden: Shoot to Kill, the Arturo Porcuna Story	
2014 (40th)	Bonifacio: Ang Unang Pangulo	
2015 (41st)	Buy Now, Die Later	
2016 (42nd)	Die Beautiful	
2017 (43rd)	Deadma Walking	
2018 (44th)	Jack Em Popoy: The Puliscredibles	
2019 (45th)	Mindanao	

=== 2020s ===
Year	Film	Ref
2020 (46th)	Magikland	
2021 (47th)	Huwag Kang Lalabas	
2022 (48th)	My Father, Myself	
2023 (49th)	When I Met You In Tokyo	
2024 (50th)	Topakk and Uninvited (tie)	
2025 (51st)	Manila's Finest and Unmarry (tie)	
