= 32nd PMPC Star Awards for Movies =

2015 Philippine Movie Press Club awards

32nd Star Awards for Movies
- Date: March 6, 2016
- Hosted by: Piolo Pascual; Kim Chiu; Xian Lim; Alex Gonzaga; Bela Padilla; Robi Domingo
- Produced by: Philippine Movie Press Club; Airtime Marketing Philippines
- Directed by: Bert de Leon

Highlights
- Best Picture: Felix Manalo (Mainstream); Bambanti (Indie)
- Most awards: Felix Manalo (Mainstream) (5); Bambanti (Indie) (5)
- Most nominations: Honor Thy Father (Mainstream) (14); Bambanti (Indie) (12)

Television coverage
- Network: ABS-CBN
- Duration: 2 hours

The 32nd PMPC Star Awards for Movies, was an accolade to give and honor the Filipino mainstream and independent films, personalities and movie industry stakeholders in the year 2015, organized by the Philippine Movie Press Club, headed by current president Fernan "Miss F" de Guzman (also a radio anchor of Radyo Inquirer) and produced by Airtime Marketing Philippines headed by Tessie Celestino-Howard. The awards night was held on March 6, 2016 at the Newport Performing Arts Theater, Resorts World Manila, Pasay and aired on ABS-CBN's Sunday Best on March 13, 2016.

The awards night was hosted by Piolo Pascual, Kim Chiu, Xian Lim, Alex Gonzaga, Bela Padilla and Robi Domingo with opening performance by Jed Madela, Yeng Constantino, Christian Bautista, Morissette Amon, Mark Bautista and Juris Fernandez commemorating the love teams and love themes of Philippine cinema. Another performance was done by #Hashtags, an all-boy dance group of noontime show It's Showtime.

One of the highlights of the event is the memoriam tribute of the PMPC to the "Master Showman" German Moreno and film directors Uro dela Cruz, Wenn V. Deramas and Francis Pasion who died on the first quarter of 2016.

The Philippine Movie Press Club currently celebrating their 50th Golden Anniversary this 2016.

== Winners and Nominees ==
These are the nominations list (in alphabetical order) for the awarding ceremony. (period of nomination: Films that have been shown from January to December 2016)

Winners are listed first and highlighted with boldface.

=== Major categories ===
Movie of the Year (Mainstream)	Movie of the Year (Indie)
Winner: **Felix Manalo** (Viva Films, Iglesia ni Cristo): A Second Chance (Star Cinema); Crazy Beautiful You (Star Cinema); Etiquette for Mistresses (Star Cinema); Heneral Luna (Artikulo Uno Productions); Honor Thy Father (Reality Entertainment); The Love Affair (Star Cinema); Walang Forever (Quantum Films, MJM Productions, Tuko Films, and Buchi Boy Films)	Winner: **Bambanti** (Sinag Maynila and Centerstage Productions): Anino sa Likod ng Buwan (IdeaFirst Company, Octobertrain Films, and APT Entertainment); I Love You, Thank You (Grit Project and Noel Ferrer Productions); Imbisibol (Sinag Maynila and Centerstage Productions); Old Skool (Til I’m 90 Film Productions and Bonfire Productions); Silong (SQ Film Laboratories and Black Maria Pictures); Taklub (Centerstage Productions); Tandem (Tuko Films and Buchi Boy Films)
Movie Director of the Year (Mainstream)	Movie Director of the Year (Indie)
Winner: **Joel Lamangan** (Felix Manalo): Cathy Garcia-Molina (A Second Chance); Chito S. Roño (Etiquette for Mistresses); Dan Villegas (Walang Forever); Erik Matti (Honor Thy Father); Jerrold Tarog (Heneral Luna); Mae Czarina Cruz-Alviar (Crazy Beautiful You); Nuel Naval (The Love Affair)	Winner: **Zig Dulay** (Bambanti): Brillante Mendoza (Taklub); Charliebebs Gohetia (I Love You, Thank You); Cia Hermosa-Jorge (Old Skool); Jeffrey Hidalgo/Roy Sevilla Ho (Silong); Jun Lana (Anino sa Likod ng Buwan); King Palisoc (Tandem); Lawrence Fajardo (Imbisibol)
Movie Actor of the Year	Movie Actress of the Year
Winner: Tied between **Dennis Trillo** (Felix Manalo) and **Piolo Pascual** (Silong): Daniel Padilla (Crazy Beautiful You); Jericho Rosales (Walang Forever); JM De Guzman (Tandem); John Arcilla (Heneral Luna); John Lloyd Cruz (Honor Thy Father); Richard Gomez (The Love Affair)	Winner: **Bea Alonzo** (A Second Chance): Dawn Zulueta (The Love Affair); Iza Calzado (Etiquette For Mistresses); LJ Reyes (Anino Sa Likod Ng Buwan); Meryll Soriano (Honor Thy Father); Nora Aunor (Taklub); Rhian Ramos (Silong); Sarah Geronimo (The Breakup Playlist)
Movie Supporting Actor of the Year	Movie Supporting Actress of the Year
Winner: **Tirso Cruz III** (Honor Thy Father): Anthony Falcon (Anino Sa Likod Ng Buwan); Danilo Fernandez (Honor Thy Father); Gerald Anderson (Everyday I Love You); Mon Confiado (Heneral Luna); Noni Buencamino (Heneral Luna); Robert Villar (Old Skool)	Winner: **Alessandra de Rossi** (Kid Kulafu): Bela Padilla (Felix Manalo); Mylene Dizon (Heneral Luna); Lorna Tolentino (Crazy Beautiful You); Pilar Pilapil (Etiquette For Mistresses); Rochelle Pangilinan (Tandem); Shamaine Buencamino (Bambanti)
New Movie Actor of the Year	New Movie Actress of the Year
Winner: **Marlo Mortel** (Haunted Mansion): CJ Reyes (I Love You, Thank You); Dino Pastrano (Baka Siguro Yata); Francis Magundayao (#Ewankosau Saranghaeyo); Jerome Ponce (Haunted Mansion); Jon Lucas (#Ewankosau Saranghaeyo); Pepe Herrera (Walang Forever)	Winner: **Janella Salvador** (Haunted Mansion): Elisse Joson (#Ewankosau Saranghaeyo); Elora Espano (Tandem); Kim Molina (Walang Forever); Maine Mendoza (My Bebe Love); Sarah Pagcaliwagan (Walang Forever); Shamaine Buencamino (Bambanti); Sue Ramirez (Just the Way You Are)
Movie Child Performer of the Year
Winner: **Micko Laurente** (Bambanti): Alonzo Muhlach (Beauty and the Bestie); Bimby Aquino Yap (All You Need Is Pag-Ibig); JR Velasco (Mandirigma); Krystal Brimner (Honor Thy Father); Marco Masa (Beauty and the Bestie); Miguel Vergara (Just The Way You Are)

=== Technical categories ===
Movie Screenwriter of the Year (Mainstream)	Movie Screenwriter of the Year (Indie)
Winner: **Michiko Yamamoto** (Honor Thy Father): Bienvenido Santiago (Felix Manalo); Carmi Raymundo, Vanessa Valdez, and Cathy Garcia-Molina (A Second Chance); Henry Francia, E.A. Rocha, and Jerrold Tarog (Heneral Luna); Kriz Gazmen and Patrick Valencia (Etiquette For Mistresses); Paul Sta. Ana (Walang Forever); Vanessa Valdez (The Love Affair)	Winner: **Jun Lana** (Anino sa Likod ng Buwan): Charliebebs Gohetia (I Love You, Thank You); Cia Hermosa-Jorge (Old Skool); Mary Honeylyn Joy Alipio (Taklub); Roy Sevilla Ho (Silong); Zig Dulay (Bambanti); Zig Marasigan (Tandem)
Movie Cinematographer of the Year (Mainstream)	Movie Cinematographer of the Year (Indie)
Winner: **Ber Cruz** (Honor Thy Father): Anne Monzon (The Love Affair); Dan Villegas and Moises Zee (Crazy Beautiful You); Neil Daza (Etiquette For Mistresses); Noel Teehankee (A Second Chance); Pong Ignacio (Heneral Luna); Rody Lacap (Felix Manalo)	Winner: **Ike Avellana** (Apocalypse Child): AB Garcia (Old Skool); Albert Banzon (I Love You, Thank You); Carlo Mendoza (Anino Sa Likod Ng Buwan); Odyssey Flores (Taklub); Rain Yamson II (Silong); Sol Garcia (Bambanti)
Movie Production Designer of the Year (Mainstream)	Movie Production Designer of the Year (Indie)
Winner: **Edgar Martin Littaua, Joel Bilbao and Danny Red** (Felix Manalo): Benjamin Padero and Carlo Tabije (Heneral Luna); Elfren Vibar (The Love Affair); Ericson Navarro (Honor Thy Father); Gerry Borreros (A Second Chance); Joey Luna (Kid Kulafu); Winston Acuyong (Crazy Beautiful You)	Winner: **Aped Santos** (Bambanti): Christina Dy (Apocalypse Child); Dante Mendoza (Taklub); Marxie Maolen Fadul (I Love You, Thank You); Roland Rebunecia (Silong); Roma Regala (Old Skool); Tonee Acejo (Anino Sa Likod Ng Buwan)
Movie Editor of the Year (Mainstream)	Movie Editor of the Year (Indie)
Winner: **Jerrold Tarog** (Heneral Luna): Beng Bandong (The Love Affair); Carlo Francisco Manatad (Etiquette For Mistresses); Jay Halili (Honor Thy Father); John Anthony Wong (Felix Manalo); Marya Ignacio (A Second Chance); Marya Ignacio (Crazy Beautiful You)	Winner: **Benjamin Tolentino** (Tandem): Lawrence Ang (Anino Sa Likod Ng Buwan); Lawrence Ang (Apocalypse Child); Lawrence Fajardo (Imbisibol); Sarah Roxas Santos (Silong); Tara Illenberger (Old Skool); Zig Dulay and Cyril Bautista (Bambanti)
Movie Musical Scorer of the Year (Mainstream)	Movie Musical Scorer of the Year (Indie)
Winner: **Jerrold Tarog** (Heneral Luna): Cesar Francis Concio (A Second Chance); Cesar Francis Concio (The Love Affair); Emerzon Texon (Walang Forever); Erwin Romulo (Honor Thy Father); Jesse Lucas (Crazy Beautiful You); Von De Guzman (Felix Manalo)	Winner: **Gauss Obenza** (I Love You, Thank You): Armi Millare (Apocalypse Child); Bryan Dumaguina (Tandem); Diwa De Leon (Taklub); Gian Gianan (Bambanti); Nonong Buencamino (Old Skool); Teresa Barrozo (Silong)
Movie Sound Engineer of the Year (Mainstream)	Movie Sound Engineer of the Year (Indie)
Winner: **Mikko Dizon and Hit Productions** (Heneral Luna): Addiss Tabong (Etiel Idioma (Felix Manalo); Arnel Labayo (Crazy Beautiful You); Aurel Claro Bilbao (A Second Chance); Aurel Claro Bilquette For Mistresses); Albert Michabao (The Love Affair); Mikko Quizon (Honor Thy Father)	Winner: **Jess Carlos** (Silong): Addiss Tabong (Bambanti); Addiss Tabong (I Love You, Thank You); Albert Michael Idioma (Anino Sa Likod Ng Buwan); Albert Michael Idioma (Imbisibol); Andrew Millalos and Addiss Tabong (Taklub); Corinne De San Jose (Apocalypse Child)
Movie Original Theme Song of the Year (Mainstream)	Movie Original Theme Song of the Year (Indie)
Winner: **Ang Sugo Ng Diyos Sa Mga Huling Araw** – composed by Joan Solitario and Ryan Solitario; arranged by Louie Ocampo; interpreted by Sarah Geronimo (Felix Manalo): All You Need Is Pag-Ibig – composed and arranged by Jungee Marcelo; interpreted by Yeng Constantino, (All You Need Is Pag-Ibig); Hanggang Wala Nang Bukas – composed, arranged, and interpreted by Ebe Dancel (Heneral Luna)	Winner: **Tulog Na** – lyrics by Zig Dulay, composed by Gian Gianan, interpreted by Alessandra de Rossi (Bambanti): Liwanag Ng Iyong Halaga – music and lyrics by Jethro Tenorio and Maynard de Guzman; interpreted by Christian Bautista (Filemon Mamon; Love’s Melody - lyrics by Celine Marie Flores, music by Nonong Buencamino, interpreted by Jay Marquez (Old Skool); Walang Hanggan – composed and interpreted by Quest (Ang Kwento Nating Dalawa); Young Again – composed, arranged, and interpreted by Armi Millare (Apocalypse Child)

== Special awards ==
Darling of the Press	Movie Loveteam of the Year
Winner: Danilo Fernandez: Alden Richards; Anne Curtis; Kaye Dacer; KC Concepcion; Sheryl Cruz; Vice Ganda	Winner: Kathryn Bernardo and Daniel Padilla (Crazy Beautiful You): Kim Chiu and Xian Lim (All You Need Is Pag-Ibig); Liza Soberano and Enrique Gil (Everyday I Love You); Maine Mendoza and Alden Richards (My Bebe Love); Nadine Lustre and James Reid (Para sa Hopeless Romantic)

- Nora Aunor Ulirang Artista Lifetime Achievement Award - Amalia Fuentes
- Ulirang Alagad ng Pelikula sa Likod ng Kamera Lifetime Achievement Award - Mel Chionglo
- Posthumous Award for Entertainment Excellence - German Moreno, accepted by his nephew, John Nite
- Male Face of the Night - John Arcilla
- Female Face of the Night - Bela Padilla

== Rundown ==
Note: Except special awards.

=== Mainstream ===
Film	Winners	Nominees
Felix Manalo	5	10
Heneral Luna	3	13
Honor Thy Father	3	14
A Second Chance	1	9
Kid Kulafu	1	2

=== Indie ===
Film	Winners	Nominees
Bambanti	5	12
Silong	2	10
Tandem	1	8
I Love You, Thank You	1	8
Apocalypse Child	1	6
Anino sa Likod ng Buwan	1	5

== See also ==
- List of Philippine films of 2015
