= Nilalang =

- One of the theatrical film poster of Nilalang
- Directed by: Pedring Lopez
- Screenplay by: Pedring Lopez; Dennis Empalmado
- Story by: Pedring Lopez
- Produced by: Pedring Lopez; Troy Montero; Wesley Villarica
- Starring: Cesar Montano; Maria Ozawa
- Cinematography: Pao Orendain
- Edited by: Jason Cahapay
- Music by: Jesse Lasaten
- Production companies: Haunted Tower Pictures; Welovepost; Parallax Studios; Viva Films; BlackOps Studios Asia
- Distributed by: Viva Films
- Release date: December 25, 2015
- Running time: 90 minutes
- Country: Philippines
- Languages: Filipino; English; Japanese

Nilalang or Sonzai-sha (存在者, Entity) is a 2015 Filipino action horror film directed by Pedring Lopez starring Cesar Montano and Maria Ozawa. It is an official entry to the 2015 Metro Manila Film Festival and was released on December 25, 2015. Nilalang is about a local forensic expert who teams up with an heiress to a transnational organized crime syndicate originating from Japan.

== Plot ==
NBI special crimes division agent Tony encounters an evil entity which is bent on killing and torturing beautiful women, one of which was his girlfriend, years after he thought to have killed the spirit. People close to Tony are placed in danger, including his partner Jane, who has a romantic interest towards him with everyone in the agency aware of this fact except for Tony.

The spirit, who has killed many people in Japan, is thought to be targeting women from a certain clan of samurai. In Manila, Miyuki takes care of the family business while her younger sister Akane is taking care of their aging father. Miyuki is later forced to help in the investigation regarding the murders after Akane goes missing and their father is found dead to put a stop to the entity's killing spree.

== Cast ==
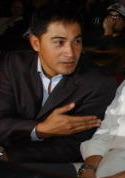
Cesar Montano portrays the role Tony, a NBI agent.

=== Main cast ===
- Cesar Montano as Tony
- Maria Ozawa as Miyuki

=== Supporting cast ===
- Meg Imperial as Jane
- Yam Concepcion as Akane
- Cholo Barretto as Totoy
- Dido de la Paz as Col. Guevarra
- Kiko Matos as Mark
- Aubrey Miles as Tin (Tony's Girlfriend)
- Alexandre Charlet as Jean-Luc Lamy (French Interpol Agent)
- Sonny Sison as Lord Ishijuki
- Jeff Centauri as Miyuki's Yakuza Bodyguard
- Khalil Ramos as Teenage Mark

== Production ==
=== Casting ===
Robin Padilla was supposed to be Ozawa's leading man in this film but due to his wife Mariel Rodriguez's delicate pregnancy, he decided to back out to take care of his wife.

== Release ==
Nilalang released its official trailer on October 12, 2015.

The film was released in the Philippines on December 25, 2015, Christmas Day, as part of the annual Metro Manila Film Festival.

== Awards ==
The film won 5 awards during the 41st Metro Manila Film Festival including Best Cinematography, Best Visual Effects, Best Editing, Best Musical Score and Best Sound Engineering.

Award	Category	Recipient	Result
41st Metro Manila Film Festival	Best Supporting Actor	Dido de la Paz	Nominated
41st Metro Manila Film Festival	Best Cinematography	Pao Orendain	Won
41st Metro Manila Film Festival	Best Editing	Jason Cahapay	Won
41st Metro Manila Film Festival	Best Visual Effects	Pedro Chuidian & Rommel Pambid	Won
41st Metro Manila Film Festival	Best Production Design	Mimi Sanson Viola	Nominated
41st Metro Manila Film Festival	Best Make-up Artist	Richard Carvajal & Alice Soro Collara	Nominated
41st Metro Manila Film Festival	Best Original Theme Song	"Greyhoundz Lions"	Nominated
41st Metro Manila Film Festival	Best Musical Score	Jessie Lasaten	Won
41st Metro Manila Film Festival	Best Sound Engineering	Ditoy Aguila	Won

== Controversy ==
=== Pullout from cinemas ===
After a day of screening, some cinemas started pulling out the film in favor of the two other blockbuster hit entries of the festival, My Bebe Love and Beauty and the Bestie. From a total of 40 theatres, the number of cinemas showing Nilalang went down to five. Because of this, the producers appealed to moviegoers and theatre owners to support the independent film the same way that they support the mainstream films of the festival. After this, the hashtag #DemandForNilalang became a trending topic on social media sites such as Twitter and Facebook, as interested movie goers urged cinema owners to screen the said film. After a few days, many theatre owners started including the film in their cinema line-up to give way to the public's request.
