= Metro Manila Film Festival Award for Best Original Story =

Annual Philippine film award

- Awarded for: Excellence in original story-writing
- Country: Philippines
- Presented by: MMDA
- First award: 1975
- Currently held by: Dan Villegas & Antoinette Jadaone, #Walang Forever (2015)
- Website: www.mmda.gov.ph/mmff/

The Metro Manila Film Festival Award for Best Original Story is an award presented annually by the Metropolitan Manila Development Authority (MMDA). It was first awarded at the 1st Metro Manila Film Festival ceremony, held in 1975; Ophelia San Juan won the award for her original story in Kapitan Kulas and it recognizes the best script not based upon previously published material. Currently, nominees and winners are determined by Executive Committees, headed by the Metropolitan Manila Development Authority Chairman and key members of the film industry.

== Winners and nominees ==
=== 1970s ===
| Year | Film | Writer(s) | Ref |
|---|---|---|---|
| 1975 (1st) | Kapitan Kulas | Ophelia San Juan | |
| 1976 (2nd) | Minsa'y isang Gamu-gamo | Edgardo Vinarao | |
| 1977 (3rd) | None (Note: No "Best Original Story" awarded.) | | |
| 1978 (4th) | None | | |
| 1979 (5th) | Kasal-kasalan, Bahay-Bahayan | Rick Acasio | |

=== 1980s ===
| Year | Film | Writer(s) | Ref |
|---|---|---|---|
| 1980 (6th) | Langis at Tubig | Danny L. Zialcita | |
| 1981 (7th) | Kisapmata | Clodualdo del Mundo, Jr., Raquel Villavicencio and Mike De Leon | |
| 1982 (8th) | - | - | |
| 1983 (9th) | - | - | |
| 1984 (10th) | Bulaklak sa City Jail | Lualhati Bautista | |
| 1985 (11th) | Paradise Inn | Celso Ad.Castillo | |
| 1986 (12th) | - | - | |
| 1987 (13th) | The Untold Story of Melanie Marquez | Melanie Marquez | |
| 1988 (14th) | Celestina Sanchez, Alyas Bubbles/ Enforcer: Ativan Gang | Carlo J. Caparas and Tony Mortel | |
| 1989 (15th) | Imortal | Orlando Nadres | |

=== 1990s ===
| Year | Film | Writer(s) | Ref |
|---|---|---|---|
| 1990 (16th) | Andrea, Paano Ba ang Maging Isang Ina? | Ricky Lee and Gil Portes | |
| 1991 (17th) | Ang Totoong Buhay ni Pacita M. | Ricky Lee | |
| 1992 (18th) | Andres Manambit: Angkan ng Matatapang | Humilde ‘Meek’ Roxas | |
| 1993 (19th) | May Minamahal | Jose Javier Reyes | |
| 1994 (20th) | Lucas Abelardo | Joe Balagtas | |
| 1995 (21st) | Muling Umawit ang Puso | Ricky Lee | |
| 1996 (22nd) | Magic Temple | Peque Gallaga, Lore Reyes, and Erik Matti | |
| 1997 (23rd) | Babae | Ruel Bayani | |
| 1998 (24th) | José Rizal | Ricky Lee, Jun Lana and Peter Lim | |
| 1999 (25th) | Muro-ami | Marilou Diaz-Abaya, Ricky Lee, and Jun Lana | |

=== 2000s ===
| Year | Film | Writer(s) | Ref |
|---|---|---|---|
| 2000 (26th) | Tanging Yaman | Laurice Guillen | |
| 2001 (27th) | Yamashita: The Tiger's Treasure | Roselle Monteverde-Teo, Roy Iglesias and Chito Rono | |
| 2002 (28th) | Mano Po | Lily Monteverde and Roy Iglesias | |
| 2003 (29th) | Mano Po 2: My Home | Lily Monteverde and Roy Iglesias | |
| 2004 (30th) | Mano Po III: My Love | Joel Lamangan, Roy Iglesias and Lily Monteverde | |
| 2005 (31st) | Blue Moon | Allan Tijamo | |
| 2006 (32nd) | Kasal, Kasali, Kasalo | José Javier Reyes | |
| 2007 (33rd) | Banal | May Cruz and Cesar Apolinario | |
| 2008 (34th) | One Night Only | Jose Javier Reyes | |
| 2009 (35th) | I Love You, Goodbye | Vanessa Valdez, Anna Karenina Ramos and Kriz Gazmen | |

=== 2010s ===
| Year | Film | Writer(s) | Ref |
|---|---|---|---|
| 2010 (36th) | Ang Tanging Ina Mo (Last na 'To!) | Mel del Rosario | |
| 2011 (37th) | Shake, Rattle & Roll 13 | Chris Martinez and Marlon Rivera ("Rain Rain Go Away" episode) | |
| 2012 (38th) | Thy Womb | Henry Burgos | |
| 2013 (39th) | 10,000 Hours | Neil Arce, Peter Serrano, Bela Padilla and Joyce Bernal | |
| 2014 (40th) | English Only, Please | Dan Villegas & Antoinette Jadaone | |
| 2015 (41st) | #Walang Forever | Dan Villegas & Antoinette Jadaone | |
| 2015 (41st) | Honor Thy Father | Michiko Yamamoto & Erik Matti | |
| 2015 (41st) | My Bebe Love: #KiligPaMore | Bibeth Orteza | |
| 2015 (41st) | Buy Now, Die Later | Ronald Allan Habon | |

== Multiple awards for Best Original Story ==
Throughout the history of Metro Manila Film Festival (MMFF), there have been story-writers who received multiple Awards for Best Original Story. As of 2015 (41st MMFF), 7 story-writers have received two or more Best Original Story awards.

| Scriptwriter | Record Set | First year awarded | Recent year awarded |
|---|---|---|---|
| Ricky Lee | 5 | 1990 | 1999 |
| Jose Javier Reyes | 3 | 1993 | 2008 |
| Roy Iglesias | 3 | 2001 | 2003 |
| Dan Villegas | 2 | 2014 | 2015 |
| Antoinette Jadaone | 2 | 2014 | 2015 |
| Lily Monteverde | 2 | 2002 | 2003 |
| Jun Lana | 2 | 1998 | 1999 |
