= Metro Manila Film Festival Award for Best Supporting Actress =

Annual Philippine film award

Metro Manila Film Festival Award
- Awarded for: Best Performance by an Actress in a Supporting Role
- Country: Philippines
- Presented by: MMDA
- First award: 1975
- Currently held by: Odette Khan, Bar Boys: After School (2025)
- Website: www.mmda.gov.ph/mmff/

The Metro Manila Film Festival Award for Best Supporting Actress is an award presented annually by the Metropolitan Manila Development Authority (MMDA). It was first awarded at the 1st Metro Manila Film Festival ceremony, held in 1975; Nida Blanca received the award for his role in Batu-Bato sa Langit and it is given in honor of an actor who has delivered an outstanding performance in a supporting role while working within the film industry. Currently, nominees and winners are determined by Executive Committees, headed by the Metropolitan Manila Development Authority Chairman and key members of the film industry.

== Winners and nominees ==
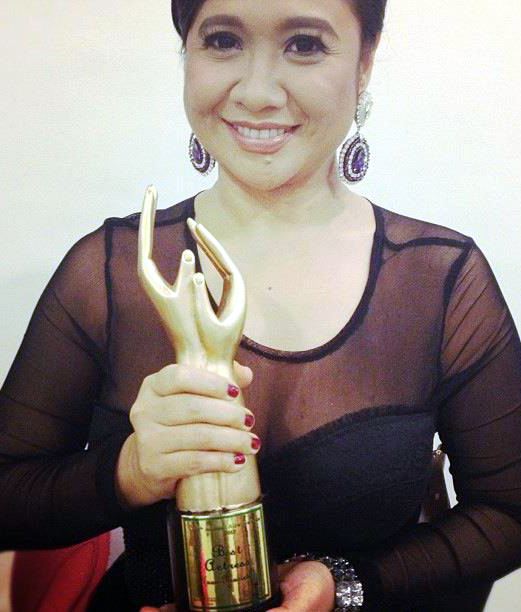
Eugene Domingo has won several awards which includes her first win in 2007 for her role in Bahay Kubo: A Pinoy Mano Po!.

Key	Explanation
‡	Indicates the winning supporting actress

=== 1970s ===
Year	Actress	Film	Role	Ref
1975 (1st)	Nida Blanca‡	Batu-bato sa Langit		
1976 (2nd)	Mona Lisa‡	Insiang	Tonia	
1977 (3rd)	Rosemarie Gil ‡	Burlesk Queen	Virgie Nite	
1978 (4th)	None (Note: Only the "Best Performer" award was given.)			
1979 (5th)	Rebecca Gonzales‡	Kasal-Kasalan, Bahay-Bahayan		

=== 1980s ===
Year	Actress	Film	Role	Ref
1980 (6th)	None (Note: Only the "Best Actor" and "Best Actress" awards were given.)			
1981 (7th)	Charito Solis‡	Kisapmata	Adelina Carandang	
1982 (8th)	Gigi Dueñas ‡	Himala	Nimia	
1983 (9th)	Alicia Alonzo‡	Bago Kumalat ang Kamandag		
1984 (10th)	Celia Rodriguez‡	Bulaklak sa City Jail	Luna	
1985 (11th)	Cherie Gil‡	God... Save Me!	Edita	
1986 (12th)	Maritess Gutierrez‡	Halimaw sa Banga	Halimaw	
1987 (13th)	Susan Africa‡	Olongapo...The Great American Dream	Mama Charlie	
1988 (14th)	Jaclyn Jose‡	Celestina Sanchez, Alyas Bubbles/ Enforcer: Ativan Gang		
1989 (15th)	Cherie Gil‡	Ang Bukas ay Akin	Mirriam	

=== 1990s ===
Year	Actress	Film	Role	Ref
1990 (16th)	Gina Alajar‡	Andrea, Paano Ba ang Maging Isang Ina?	Joyce	
1991 (17th)	Tetchie Agbayani‡	Okay Ka, Fairy Ko!: The Movie	Luka	
1992 (18th)	Sylvia Sanchez‡	Takbo, Talon, Tili	Lucresia/Ms. Lopez	
1992 (18th)	Tetchie Agbayani	Okay Ka, Fairy Ko!: Part 2	Munita	
1993 (19th)	Amy Austria‡	Kung Mawawala Ka Pa	Sylvia	
1994 (20th)	Teresa Loyzaga‡	Lucas Abelardo	Lucas's Wife	
1995 (21st)	Donna Cruz‡	Muling Umawit ang Puso	Noemi	
1996 (22nd)	Jean Garcia‡	Trudis Liit	Clara	
1997 (23rd)	Nida Blanca‡	Babae	Lola Adora	
1998 (24th)	Gloria Diaz‡	José Rizal	Teodora Alonzo	
1999 (25th)	Angelu de Leon‡	Bulaklak ng Maynila	Ada	

=== 2000s ===
Year	Actress	Film	Role	Ref
2000 (26th)	Cherie Gil‡	Sugatang Puso	Miriam	
2001 (27th)	Alessandra de Rossi‡	Hubog	Nikka	
2002 (28th)	Kris Aquino‡	Mano Po	Juliet Go-Co	
2003 (29th)	Hilda Koronel‡	Crying Ladies	Rhoda Aling Doray Rivera	
2004 (30th)	Rebecca Lusterio ‡	Panaghoy sa Suba	Bikay (Duroy's sister)	
2005 (31st)	Cherry Pie Picache‡	Ako Legal Wife	Patty Que-Chiong	
2006 (32nd)	Gina Pareño‡	Kasal, Kasali, Kasalo	Belita	
2007 (33rd)	Eugene Domingo‡	Bahay Kubo: A Pinoy Mano Po!	Marang	
2008 (34th)	Manilyn Reynes‡	One Night Only	George	
2009 (35th)	Heart Evangelista‡	Mano Po 6: A Mother's Love	Stephanie Uy	
2009 (35th)	Heart Evangelista	Nobody, Nobody But... Juan	Young Aida	
2009 (35th)	Kim Chiu	I Love You, Goodbye	Ysa Benitez	

=== 2010s ===
Year	Actress	Film	Role	Ref
2010 (36th)	Eugene Domingo‡	Ang Tanging Ina Mo (Last na 'To!)	Rowena	
2011 (37th)	Eugene Domingo‡	My Househusband (Ikaw Na!)	Aida	
2011 (37th)	Bing Loyzaga	Enteng ng Ina Mo	Satana/Amarillo	
2011 (37th)	Solenn Heussaff	Yesterday, Today, Tomorrow	Selene	
2012 (38th)	Wilma Doesnt‡	Sisterakas	Jessie	
2012 (38th)	Gina Pareno	One More Try	Lola Medy	
2013 (39th)	Aiza Seguerra‡	My Little Bossings	Ice	
2013 (39th)	Gloria Sevilla	Boy Golden	Aling Puring	
2013 (39th)	Shaina Magdayao	Pagpag: Siyam na Buhay	Lucy	
2013 (39th)	Carla Humphries	10,000 Hours	Isabelle Manahan	
2013 (39th)	Mylene Dizon	10,000 Hours	Anna Alcaraz	
2014 (40th)	Lotlot de Leon‡	Kubot: The Aswang Chronicles	Nieves	
2014 (40th)	Cai Cortez	English Only, Please	Mallows	
2014 (40th)	Nikki Gil	My Big Bossing's Adventures	Prinsesa Reyna Beatriz	
2014 (40th)	Chanda Romero	Shake, Rattle & Roll XV	Aling Lina	
2014 (40th)	Carmi Martin	Feng Shui 2	Ruby Anonuevo	
2015 (41st)	Maine Mendoza‡	My Bebe Love	Anna Carillo	
2015 (41st)	Nova Villa	All You Need Is Pag-Ibig	Loisa	
2015 (41st)	Kim Molina	#WalangForever	Luli	
2015 (41st)	Iza Calzado	Haunted Mansion	Amara	
2015 (41st)	Lotlot de Leon	Buy Now, Die Later	Maita	
2016 (42nd)	Phoebe Walker‡	Seklusyon	Madre Cecilia	
2016 (42nd)	Cai Cortez	Ang Babae sa Septic Tank 2: #ForeverIsNotEnough	Jocelyn	
2016 (42nd)	Gladys Reyes	Die Beautiful	Beth	
2016 (42nd)	Mercedes Cabral	Oro	Linda	
2017 (43rd)	Jasmine Curtis-Smith‡	Siargao	Abi	
2017 (43rd)	Rachel Alejandro	Ang Larawan	Paula Marasigan	
2017 (43rd)	Menchu Lauchengco	Ang Larawan	Pepang	
2017 (43rd)	Dimples Romana	Deadma Walking	Mary	
2017 (43rd)	Andrea Torres	Meant to Beh	Agatha Bayona	
2018 (44th)	Aiko Melendez‡	Rainbow's Sunset	Georgina	
2019 (45th)	Yeng Constantino‡	Write About Love	Joyce	
2019 (45th)	Meryll Soriano	Culion	Ditas	
2019 (45th)	Krystal Brimner	Sunod		

=== 2020s ===
Year	Actress	Film	Role	Ref
2020 (46th)	Shaina Magdayao‡	Tagpuan		
2020 (46th)	Jaclyn Jose	Mang Kepweng: Ang Lihim ng Bandanang Itim	Milagros	
2020 (46th)	Miles Ocampo	The Missing	Len	
2020 (46th)	Bibeth Orteza	Magikland	Mama Mandalagan	
2020 (46th)	Rosanna Roces	Suarez: The Healing Priest	Noel's mother	
2021 (47th)	Rans Rifol‡	Kun Maupay Man it Panahon	Andrea	
2021 (47th)	Eugene Domingo	Big Night!	Madam	
2021 (47th)	Janice de Belen	Big Night!	Melba	
2022 (48th)	Dimples Romana ‡	My Father, Myself	Amanda	
2022 (48th)	Tiffany Grey	My Father, Myself	Mica	
2022 (48th)	Louise delos Reyes	Deleter	Aileen	
2023 (49th)	Miles Ocampo ‡	Family of Two	Czarina	
2023 (49th)	Alessandra de Rossi	Firefly	Mariela "Elay" Alvaro	
2023 (49th)	Agot Isidro	Becky & Badette	Nirvana Batungbakal	
2023 (49th)	Gloria Diaz	Mallari	Doña Facunda Mallari	
2023 (49th)	Janella Salvador	Mallari	Agnes Salvador	
2024 (50th)	Kakki Teodoro ‡	Isang Himala	Nimia	
2024 (50th)	Chanda Romero	Espantaho	Adele	
2024 (50th)	Lorna Tolentino	Espantaho	Rosa	
2024 (50th)	Gabby Padilla	Uninvited	Lily Capistrano	
2024 (50th)	Nadine Lustre	Uninvited	Nicolette Chantal "Nicole" Remegio Vega	
2024 (50th)	Cristine Reyes	The Kingdom	Dayang Matimyas	
2025 (51st)	Odette Khan ‡	Bar Boys: After School		
2025 (51st)	Janice de Belen	I'mPerfect		
2025 (51st)	Sylvia Sanchez	I'mPerfect		
2025 (51st)	Ashtine Olviga	Manila's Finest		
2025 (51st)	Eugene Domingo	Unmarry		
2025 (51st)	Solenn Heussaff	Unmarry		

== Multiple awards for Best Supporting Actress ==
Throughout the history of Metro Manila Film Festival (MMFF), there have been actresses who received multiple Awards for Best Supporting Actress. As of 2015 (41st MMFF), 3 actresses have received two or more Best Supporting Actress awards.

Actress	Record Set	First year awarded	Recent year awarded
Eugene Domingo	3	2007	2011
Cherie Gil	3	1985	2000
Nida Blanca	2	1975	1997
