= Honor Thy Father (film) =

2015 film

- Theatrical release poster by Justin Besana
- Directed by: Erik Matti
- Screenplay by: Michiko Yamamoto
- Story by: Erik Matti; Michiko Yamamoto
- Produced by: Erik Matti
- Starring: John Lloyd Cruz; Meryll Soriano; Tirso Cruz III
- Cinematography: Ber Cruz
- Edited by: Jay Halili
- Music by: Erwin Romulo
- Production company: Reality Entertainment
- Release dates: September 12, 2015 (TIFF); December 25, 2015 (MMFF)
- Running time: 115 minutes
- Country: Philippines
- Languages: Filipino; English

Honor Thy Father (originally titled as Con-Man) is a 2015 Filipino heist thriller film directed by Erik Matti, from a screenplay written by his wife Michiko Yamamoto. The film revolves around a struggling family who find themselves in a Ponzi scheme. Edgar (John Lloyd Cruz) and Kaye (Meryll Soriano) seek to pay their family's debts to Kaye's co-parishioners out of fears that they may hurt their daughter. Edgar schemes with his relatives to rob donations to repay their debts.

It was screened in the Contemporary World Cinema section of the 2015 Toronto International Film Festival. It was an official entry to the 2015 Metro Manila Film Festival.

== Plot ==
Edgar (Cruz) and his wife Kaye (Soriano) work together to provide for their young daughter Angel. Kaye offers investment opportunities to friends and other members of their church, which she religiously attends. When their home is burglarized, Kaye's father is murdered and they find that all their money has been stolen. An angry mob of investors soon ransack their house and beat Edgar unconscious. Another couple, Jessica (Aguila) and Cedric (Vera Perez), kidnap Angel and persuade them to shave her head to taunt Edgar and Kaye into giving back their money.

When even the bishop of the church refuses to help, Edgar resorts to desperate measures. He borrows a gun from a friend and tries to rob a bank but fails to get the money. Finally, he devices a plan to steal money from the church with the help of his childhood friends.

== Cast ==
- John Lloyd Cruz as Edgar
- Meryll Soriano as Kaye
- Dan Fernandez as Manny
- Tirso Cruz III as Bishop Tony
- Perla Bautista as Nanang
- Yayo Aguila as Jessica
- Khalil Ramos as Emil
- William Martinez as Pastor Obet
- Krystal Brimner as Angel
- Lander Vera Perez as Cedric
- Boom Labrusca as Erwin

== Production ==
=== Development ===
The film was directed by Erik Matti. The film's lead actor, John Lloyd Cruz alongside Dondon Monteverde served as executive producers of the film. Agosto Dos Pictures, was originally planned to be co-producer of the film along with Reality Entertainment. The film was originally titled Ponzi.

=== Casting ===
John Lloyd Cruz was chosen to portray the lead character of the film. The actor shaved his head for the role despite warnings from his big studio handlers that he might lose endorsement contracts, especially for a certain shampoo product. The actor sought to break away from the leading man role that people are familiar with in his mainstream films and also explained that his acting work isn't confined to his home television network, ABS-CBN, stating that he "refuses to be typecast". He sought to project a different image from the one audiences have gotten accustomed to by playing a lead role in an indie film.

Originally, Dingdong Dantes was also offered to portray John Lloyd's role but it was the latter that ultimately played the role.

=== Filming ===
The film was shot in Macabebe, Pampanga, Baguio and nearby towns. About 16 hours of shooting was spent inside the mines of Camp 6 along Kennon Road.

== Release ==
Honor thy Father was first screened in the Contemporary World Cinema section of the 2015 Toronto International Film Festival. It was also screened in the Cinema One Originals Film Festival in November 2015. The film was accepted as an official entrant to the 2015 Metro Manila Film Festival after Hermano Puli, a historical biopic directed by Gil Portes, withdrew from the festival on October.

== Awards ==
At the 2015 Metro Manila Film Festival, the film was subsequently disqualified from the Best Picture category led to controversy, and Lloyd Cruz and the film's crew. One of the film's producers said: “We complied with all the MMFF’s requirements; we did not commit any non-disclosure of any kind; no MMFF rule was ever violated by Honor Thy Father.”

| Award | Category | Recipient | Result |
|---|---|---|---|
| 41st Metro Manila Film Festival | Best Director | Erik Matti | Won |
| 41st Metro Manila Film Festival | Best Actor | John Lloyd Cruz | Nominated |
| 41st Metro Manila Film Festival | Best Actress | Meryll Soriano | Nominated |
| 41st Metro Manila Film Festival | Best Supporting Actor | Tirso Cruz III | Won |
| 41st Metro Manila Film Festival | Best Child Performer | Krystal Brimner | Won |
| 41st Metro Manila Film Festival | Best Cinematography | Ber Cruz | Nominated |
| 41st Metro Manila Film Festival | Best Screenplay | Michiko Yamamoto | Nominated |
| 41st Metro Manila Film Festival | Best Original Story | Michiko Yamamoto and Erik Matti | Nominated |
| 41st Metro Manila Film Festival | Best Production Design | Ericson Navarro | Nominated |
| 41st Metro Manila Film Festival | Best Make-up Artist | Ryan Panaligan and Erika Racela | Won |
| 41st Metro Manila Film Festival | Best Original Theme Song | Tao | Won |
| 41st Metro Manila Film Festival | Best Musical Score | Erwin Romulo | Nominated |
| 41st Metro Manila Film Festival | Best Sound Engineering | Mikko Quizon | Nominated |
32nd PMPC Star Awards for Movies
| 32nd PMPC Star Awards for Movies | Movie of the Year | Honor Thy Father | Nominated |
| 32nd PMPC Star Awards for Movies | Movie Director of the Year | Erik Matti | Nominated |
| 32nd PMPC Star Awards for Movies | Movie Actor of the Year | John Lloyd Cruz | Nominated |
| 32nd PMPC Star Awards for Movies | Movie Actress of the Year | Meryll Soriano | Nominated |
| 32nd PMPC Star Awards for Movies | Movie Supporting Actor of the Year | Tirso Cruz III | Won |
| 32nd PMPC Star Awards for Movies | Movie Supporting Actor of the Year | Danilo Fernandez | Nominated |
| 32nd PMPC Star Awards for Movies | Movie Child Performer of the Year | Krystal Brimner | Nominated |
| 32nd PMPC Star Awards for Movies | Movie Screenwriter of the Year | Michiko Yamamoto | Won |
| 32nd PMPC Star Awards for Movies | Movie Cinematographer of the Year | Ber Cruz | Won |
| 32nd PMPC Star Awards for Movies | Movie Production Designer of the Year | Ericson Navarro | Nominated |
| 32nd PMPC Star Awards for Movies | Movie Editor of the Year | Jay Halili | Nominated |
| 32nd PMPC Star Awards for Movies | Movie Musical Scorer of the Year | Erwin Romulo | Nominated |
| 32nd PMPC Star Awards for Movies | Movie Sound Engineer of the Year | Mikko Quizon | Nominated |
