= Metro Manila Film Festival Award for Best Child Performer =

Phlippine film award

- Awarded for: Best Performance by a Child Actor/Actress
- Country: Philippines
- Presented by: MMDA
- First award: 1980
- Currently held by: Lucas Andalio, Call Me Mother (2025)
- Website: www.mmda.gov.ph/mmff/

The Metro Manila Film Festival Award for Best Child Performer is an award presented annually by the Metropolitan Manila Development Authority (MMDA). It was first awarded at the 6th Metro Manila Film Festival ceremony, held in 1980; Julie Vega won the award for her performance in Kape't Gatas and it is given to a child acting in a motion picture. Currently, nominees and winners are determined by Executive Committees, headed by the Metropolitan Manila Development Authority Chairman and key members of the film industry.

== Winners and nominees ==
Key	Explanation
‡	Indicates the winning actor

=== 1980s ===
Year	Child Actor	Film	Role	Ref
1980 (6th)	Julie Vega‡	Kape't Gatas	Wewet	
1981 (7th)	Bentot Jr.‡	Ang Pagbabalik ng Panday		
1981 (7th)	Dranreb Belleza‡	Kapitan Kidlat		
1982 (8th)	—			
1983 (9th)	Jaypee de Guzman and Ben Pelayo‡	Teng Teng de Sarapen	Sonny	
1984 (10th)	Chuckie Dreyfus‡	Idol	Obet	
1985 (11th)	Katrin Gonzales‡	Ano ang Kulay ng Mukha ng Diyos?	Maripi	
1986 (12th)	Ian de Leon‡	Halimaw sa Banga		
1987 (13th)	Cheche Sta. Ana‡	Action Is not Missing		
1988 (14th)	RR Herrera‡	Agila ng Maynila		
1989 (15th)	Atong Redillas‡	Ang Mahiwagang Daigdig ni Elias Paniki		

=== 1990s ===
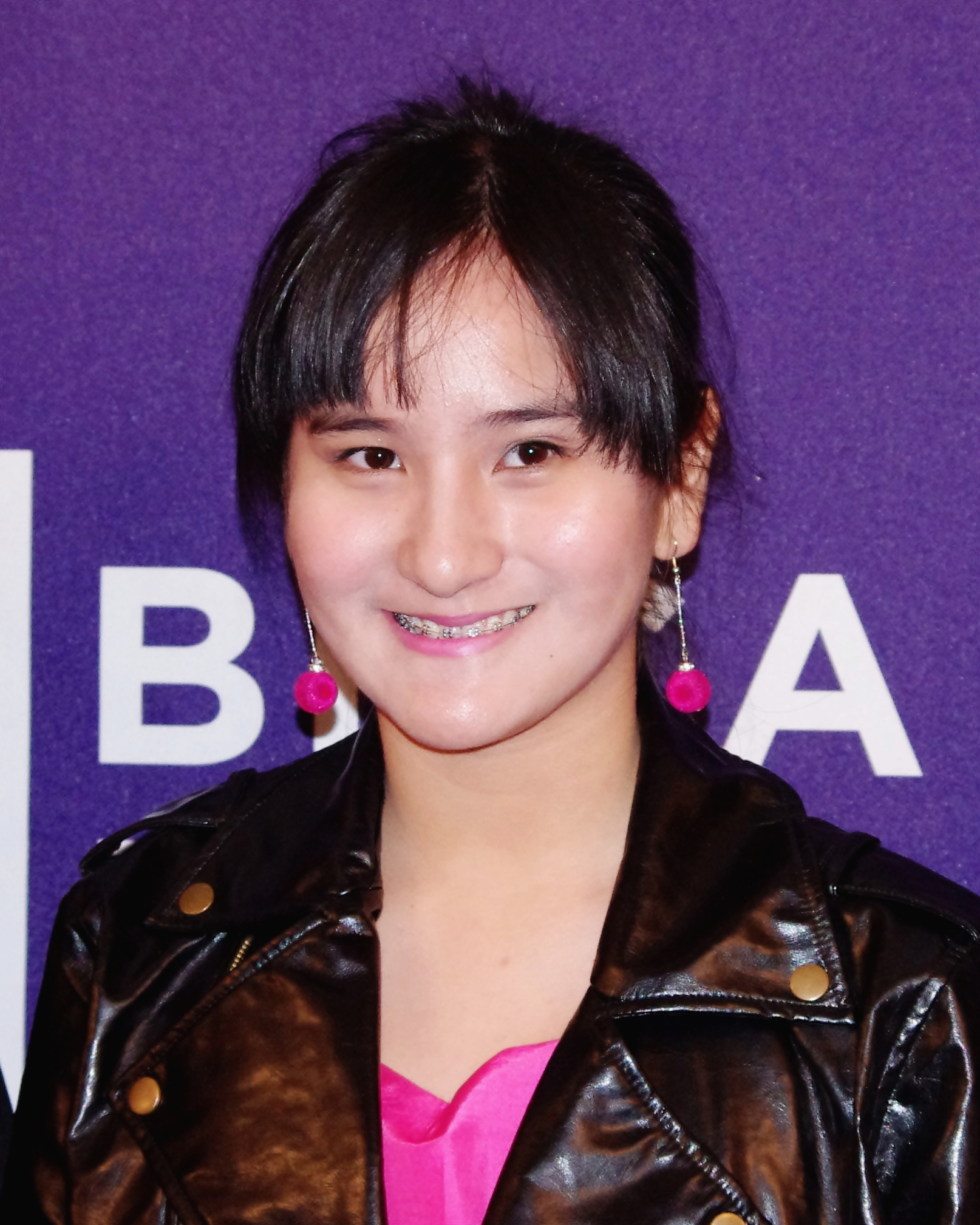
Ella Guevara won in 2004 for her role in Sigaw.

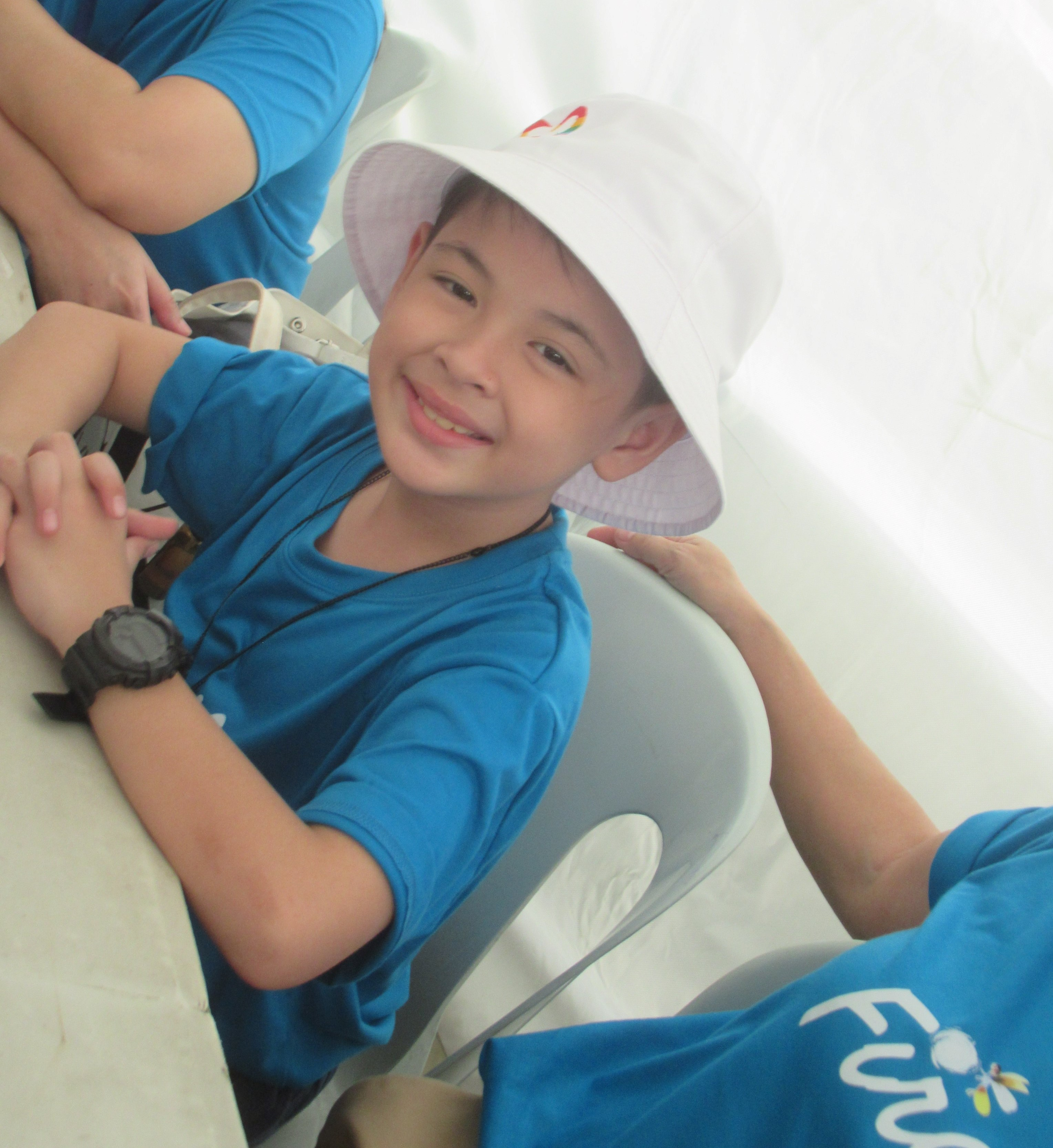
Euwenn Mikaell Aleta won in 2023 for his role in Firefly (2023 film).

Year	Child Actor	Film	Role	Ref
1990 (16th)	Guila Alvarez‡	Ama Bakit Mo Ako Pinabayaan		
1990 (16th)	Vandolph‡	Espadang Patpat		
1990 (16th)	RR Herrera	Andrea, Paano Ba ang Maging Isang Ina?		
1991 (17th)	Aiza Seguerra‡	Okay Ka Fairy Ko, The Movie	Aiza	
1992 (18th)	I.C. Mendoza‡	Shake, Rattle & Roll IV	Teks	
1993 (19th)	Sarah Jane Abad‡	Kung Mawawala Ka Pa		
1994 (20th)	Tom Taus, Jr.‡	Shake, Rattle & Roll V	Charlie	
1995 (21st)	Charina Scott‡	Huwag Mong Isuko ang Laban	Cheska	
1996 (22nd)	Agatha Tapan‡	Trudis Liit		
1997 (23rd)	—			
1998 (24th)	—			
1999 (25th)	Rebecca Lusterio‡	Muro-ami	Kalbo	

=== 2000s ===
Year	Child Actor	Film	Role	Ref
2000 (26th)	—			
2001 (27th)	Jiro Manio‡	Yamashita: The Tiger's Treasure	Francis delos Santos	
2002 (28th)	John Wayne Sace‡	Dekada '70	Benjamin "Bingo" Bartolome	
2003 (29th)	Julio Pacheco‡	Crying Ladies	Bong	
2004 (30th)	Ella Guevara‡	Sigaw	Lara	
2005 (31st)	Paul Salas‡	Shake, Rattle and Roll 2k5	Paul	
2006 (32nd)	Nash Aguas‡	Shake, Rattle & Roll 8	Benjo	
2007 (33rd)	Nash Aguas‡	Shake, Rattle & Roll 9	Stephen	
2008 (34th)	Robert Villar‡	Shake, Rattle & Roll X	Junie	
2009 (35th)	Robert Villar‡	Ang Panday	Bugoy	

=== 2010s ===
Year	Child Actor	Film	Role	Ref
2010 (36th)	Xyriel Manabat‡	Ang Tanging Ina Mo (Last na 'To!)	Monay Montecillo	
2011 (37th)	Bugoy Cariño‡	Shake, Rattle & Roll 13	Bikbok	
2011 (37th)	Sofia Millares	Segunda Mano	Angel	
2012 (38th)	Miguel Vergara‡	One More Try	Bochok	
2013 (39th)	Ryzza Mae Dizon‡	My Little Bossings	Ching	
2014 (40th)	Ryzza Mae Dizon‡	My Big Bossing's Adventures	Jessa, Angel, Biiktoria/Victoria	
2015 (41st)	Krystal Brimner‡	Honor Thy Father	Angel	
2015 (41st)	Sol de Guzman	Buy Now, Die Later		
2015 (41st)	Alonzo Muhlach	Beauty and the Bestie	Jumbo	
2015 (41st)	Marco Masa	Beauty and the Bestie	Jimbo	
2015 (41st)	Julia & Talia Concio	All You Need Is Pag-Ibig	Kelsey and Hannah	
2016 (42nd)	—			
2017 (43rd)	Bae-by Baste‡	Meant to Beh	Riley	
2018 (44th)	Phoebe Villamor‡	Aurora	Rita	
2019 (45th)	Yuna Tango‡	Mindanao	Aisa Datupalo	
2019 (45th)	Xia Vigor	Miracle in Cell No. 7	Yesha	
2019 (45th)	Rhed Bustamante	Sunod		

=== 2020s ===
Year	Child Actor	Film	Role	Ref
2020 (46th)	Seiyo Masunaga‡	The Missing	Aki	
2020 (46th)	Jana Agoncillo	Coming Home	Becy	
2020 (46th)	Miguel Gabriel Diokno	Tagpuan	Buboy	
2020 (46th)	Ryan Jay Obana	Tagpuan	Young Allan	
2021 (47th)	—			
2022 (48th)	Shawn Niño Gabriel‡	My Father, Myself	Young Matthew	
2023 (49th)	Euwenn Mikaell Aleta‡	Firefly	Anthony 'Tonton ' Alvaro	
2023 (49th)	Jordan Lim	Rewind	Austin Nuñez	
2023 (49th)	Erin Espiritu	Kampon	Jade Bitangcol	
2024 (50th)	Sienna Stevens‡	Green Bones	Young Ruth	
2024 (50th)	Kean Co	Espantaho	Keith	
2024 (50th)	Zion Cruz	The Kingdom	Prinsipe Felipe	
2025 (51st)	Lucas Andalio‡	Call Me Mother	Angelo	
2025 (51st)	Argus Aspiras	Love You So Bad	Ritchie	
2025 (51st)	Ellie Cruz	Rekonek	Lana	

== Multiple awards for Best Child Performer ==
Throughout the history of Metro Manila Film Festival (MMFF), there have been actors who received multiple Awards for Best Child Performer. As of 2015 (41st MMFF), 4 actors have received two or more Best Child Performer awards.

Actor	Record Set	First year awarded	Recent year awarded
Ryzza Mae Dizon	2	2013	2014
Robert Villar	2	2008	2009
Nash Aguas	2	2006	2007
RR Herrera	2	1988	1990
