= Metro Manila Film Festival Award for Best Production Design =

Award presented annually by the Metropolitan Manila Development Authority (MMDA)

- Awarded for: Excellence in art direction on a film
- Country: Philippines
- Presented by: MMDA
- First award: 1976
- Currently held by: Digo Ricio, Manila's Finest (2025)
- Website: www.mmda.gov.ph/mmff/

The Metro Manila Film Festival Award for Best Production Design is an award presented annually by the Metropolitan Manila Development Authority (MMDA) to recognize achievement in art direction in film. It was first awarded in 1976 at the 2nd Metro Manila Film Festival ceremony, to Augusto Buenaventura for Diligin mo ng Hamog ang Uhaw na Lupa. The category's original name was Best Art Direction but was changed to its current name in 1987. Currently, nominees and winners are determined by executive committees, headed by the Metropolitan Manila Development Authority Chairman and key members of the film industry.

== Winners and nominees ==
=== 1970s ===
| Year | Film | Production Designer(s) | Ref |
|---|---|---|---|
| 1976 (2nd) | Ganito Kami Noon, Paano Kayo Ngayon | Laida Lim-Perez and Peque Gallaga | |
| 1977 (3rd) | Mga Bilanggong Birhen | Laida Lim-Perez | |
| 1978 (4th) | Katawang Alabok | Robert L. Lee III and Peter Perlas | |
| 1979 (5th) | None (Note: No one received "Best Art Direction" category.) | | |

=== 1980s ===
| Year | Film | Production Designer(s) | Ref |
|---|---|---|---|
| 1980 (6th) | None | | |
| 1981 (7th) | Kisapmata | | |
| 1982 (8th) | Himala | Raquel Villavicencio | |
| 1983 (9th) | Karnal | Fiel Zabat | |
| 1984 (10th) | Alapaap | Joe Tutanes | |
| 1985 (11th) | Ano ang Kulay ng Mukha ng Diyos? | Benjie de Guzman | |
| 1986 (12th) | Halimaw sa Banga | Frank G. Rivera | |
| 1987 (13th) | Wag Mong Bubuhayin ng Bangkay | Apol Salonga | |
| 1988 (14th) | Pik Pak Boom | Manny Morfe | |
| 1989 (15th) | Imortal | Elmer Manapul | |

=== 1990s ===
| Year | Film | Production Designer(s) | Ref |
|---|---|---|---|
| 1990 (16th) | Shake, Rattle & Roll II | Don Escudero | |
| 1991 (17th) | Juan Tamad at Mister Shooli sa Mongolian Barbeque | Edel Templonuevo | |
| 1992 (18th) | Shake, Rattle & Roll IV | Don Escudero | |
| 1993 (19th) | May Minamahal | Benjie de Guzman | |
| 1994 (20th) | Ang Pagbabalik ni Pedro Penduko | Ben Payumo | |
| 1995 (21st) | Muling Umawit ang Puso | | |
| 1996 (22nd) | Magic Temple | Rodell Cruz | |
| 1997 (23rd) | Magic Kingdom | Bradley J. Mayer | |
| 1998 (24th) | José Rizal | Leo Abaya | |
| 1999 (25th) | Muro-ami | Leo Abaya | |

=== 2000s ===
| Year | Film | Production Designer(s) | Ref |
|---|---|---|---|
| 2000 (26th) | Deathrow | Joey Luna | |
| 2001 (27th) | Yamashita: The Tiger's Treasure | Fernan Santiago and Max Paglinawan | |
| 2002 (28th) | Mano Po | Tatus Aldana | |
| 2003 (29th) | Mano Po 2: My Home | Rodell Cruz | |
| 2004 (30th) | Mano Po 3: My Love | Rodell Cruz | |
| 2005 (31st) | Exodus: Tales from the Enchanted Kingdom | Richard Somes | |
| 2006 (32nd) | Mano Po 5: Gua Ai Di | Edgar Martin Littaua | |
| 2007 (33rd) | Resiklo | Rodel Cruz | |
| 2008 (34th) | Baler | Aped Santos | |
| 2009 (35th) | Ang Panday | Richard Somes | |

=== 2010s ===
| Year | Film | Production Designer(s) | Ref |
|---|---|---|---|
| 2010 (36th) | Rosario | Joey Luna | |
| 2011 (37th) | Manila Kingpin: The Asiong Salonga Story | Fritz Siloria, Mona Soriano, and Ronaldo Cadapan | |
| 2012 (38th) | Thy Womb | Dante Mendoza | |
| 2014 (40th) | Kubot: The Aswang Chronicles | Ericsson Navarro | |
| 2015 (41st) | Buy Now, Die Later | Angel Diesta | |
| 2015 (41st) | All You Need Is Pag-Ibig | Shari Marie Montiague | |
| 2015 (41st) | Honor Thy Father | Ericson Navarro | |
| 2015 (41st) | Haunted Mansion | Jerann Ordinario | |
| 2015 (41st) | Nilalang | Mimi Sanson Viola | |
| 2016 (42nd) | Seklusyon | Ericson Navarro | |
| 2017 (43rd) | Ang Larawan | Gino Gonzales | |
| 2018 (44th) | Rainbow's Sunset | Jay Custodio | |
| 2019 (45th) | Sunod | Ericson Navarro | |
| 2019 (45th) | Mindanao | Dante Mendoza | |
| 2019 (45th) | Write About Love | Monica Sevia | |

=== 2020s ===
| Year | Film | Production Designer(s) | Ref |
|---|---|---|---|
| 2020 (46th) | Magikland | Ericson Navarro | |
| 2020 (46th) | Tagpuan | Ericson Navarro | |
| 2020 (46th) | The Missing | Popo Diaz | |
| 2020 (46th) | Suarez: The Healing Priest | Ronnie Dizon | |
| 2020 (46th) | The Boy Foretold by the Stars | Lars Magbanua | |
| 2021 (47th) | Kun Maupay Man it Panahon | Juan Manuel Alcazaren | |
| 2021 (47th) | Big Night! | Maolen Fadul | |
| 2021 (47th) | Love at First Stream | Norico Santos | |
| 2022 (48th) | Nanahimik ang Gabi | Mariel Hizon | |
| 2022 (48th) | Mamasapano: Now It Can Be Told | Ericson Navarro | |
| 2022 (48th) | Deleter | Marc Jayson Jose | |
| 2023 (49th) | GomBurZa | Ericson Navarro | |
| 2023 (49th) | Penduko | Ericson Navarro | |
| 2023 (49th) | Becky & Badette | Jaylo Conanan | |
| 2023 (49th) | Firefly | Kenneth Villanueva | |
| 2023 (49th) | Mallari | Mariel Hizon | |
| 2024 (50th) | The Kingdom | Nestor Abrogena | |
| 2024 (50th) | Espantaho | Angel Diesta | |
| 2024 (50th) | Green Bones | Maolen Fadul | |
| 2024 (50th) | Isang Himala | Ericcson Navarro | |
| 2024 (50th) | Strange Frequencies: Taiwan Killer Hospital | Jerann Ordinario | |
| 2024 (50th) | Topakk | Richard Somes | |
| 2025 (51st) | Manila's Finest | Digo Ricio | |
| 2025 (51st) | Call Me Mother | Jaylo Conanan | |
| 2025 (51st) | Love You So Bad | Maolen Fadul | |
| 2025 (51st) | Rekonek | Remton Zuasola | |
| 2025 (51st) | Shake, Rattle & Roll Evil Origins: 2050 | Leo Velasco Jr. | |
