= Buy Now, Die Later =

2015 film by Randolph Longjas

- Theatrical release poster
- Directed by: Randolph Longjas
- Written by: Ronald Allan Habon
- Produced by: Alemberg Ang
- Starring: Vhong Navarro; Alex Gonzaga; John Lapus; Rayver Cruz; Lotlot de Leon; Janine Gutierrez; TJ Trinidad
- Cinematography: Pong Ignacio
- Edited by: Carlo Francisco Manatad
- Music by: Jerrold Tarog
- Production companies: Quantum Films; MJM Production; Tuko Film Production; Buchi Boy Films
- Distributed by: Quantum Films
- Release date: December 25, 2015
- Running time: 118 minutes
- Country: Philippines
- Language: Filipino

Buy Now, Die Later (formerly Death and Senses) is a 2015 Filipino comedy horror anthology film directed by Randolph Longjas starring Vhong Navarro, Alex Gonzaga, Rayver Cruz, John Lapus, Lotlot de Leon, TJ Trinidad and Janine Gutierrez. It is an official entry to the 2015 Metro Manila Film Festival.

The film is about a compendium of five interrelated stories brought together by the proprietor of a curio shop selling unusual items. Each of the character's story is weaved around the five senses – sense of sight, hearing, smell, touch and taste.

The film's official trailer was released on December 4, 2015.

== Plot ==
=== "Masid" (Sight) ===
The story starts with Odie, a photojournalist. He is a desperate blogger who wants to be as famous as his father, who was a renowned photographer. After failing to get the controversial picture of a congressman and his mistress Natasha, his boss gives him an ultimatum that if he fails to submit a picture, he will be fired.

He confides his problem to his best friend Ato, who is a successful owner of a restaurant. Odie walks by himself and comes across an antique shop he had never seen before. He goes in and is greeted by Santi, the eccentric owner of the antique shop. Odie's attention is caught when he sees a portrait of a beautiful woman which he recognized was the work of his late father. He offers him a camera that will solve all of his problems, but in return, he has to sign a contract that states:

1. He should never tell anyone about the store;
2. He should take good care of the camera and not destroy it; and
3. He should only take pictures if deemed necessary.

A slash on his hands soon appears.

Odie reaches the peak of his career when Natasha is found dead in a car by Odie. He takes pictures and uploads it to his vlog, gaining him his wanted fame. Then the congressman soon dies, escalating his fame even more when he also finds the body. However, Odie feels guilt when he realizes the happenings are not normal.

His camera then reveals another victim whom Odie attempts to save. He goes to a parking space where he believes the next victim would be. He is then struck in the back by Chloe Narciso. Odie grabs the blunt object from her. He then realizes that all along, the camera has been possessing him and he was the one who killed Natasha and the congressman. Odie turns violent and starts to move towards Chloe. In fright, Chloe attempts to escape only to be run over by a car.

=== "Dinig" (Hearing) ===
The scene then jumps to Chloe walking into a talk show. Chloe is a well-known singer who is pushed to fame by her ambitious mother Maita. Before her fame, she is a frustrated and terrible singer. Maita then tells her to "visit" someone she knew who could help her. The two go to Santi's shop and ask for his help. Santi offers Chloe a phone which will make her famous and grant all her wishes, but she is asked to sign a contract that states:

1. She must never tell anyone about the store;
2. She must take care of the phone and not destroy it; and
3. She must not answer any messages unknown to her.

As with Odie, a slash then appears on her hands.

One night, Chloe attempts to record herself playing the guitar while singing. As she watches the video; to her surprise, she sounds amazing. This leads to her being one of the most recognized singers in town. Some time later, what seems to be a virtual assistant mobile app pops into her screen and starts asking Chloe questions that could not be said by a mere app. She starts talking to it like a real person and in turn, it always tells her everything about everyone.

When a blind item rumor against Chloe spreads all over the internet, the app warns her that it was done by her friends, one of which included Natasha, the congressman's mistress, whom she confronts in a restaurant. The app asks Chloe what she wants to do, and wishes Natasha dead. Natasha, in reality was killed when a vlogger (Odie) revealed it in his website.

After telling her story, Chloe breaks down and the talk show is forced to cut. Suddenly, the voice of the app begins bothering her again. She runs to her dressing room and is followed by Maita. The two have a heated argument when Chloe tells her she destroyed the phone; Maita walks out. To Chloe's fright, the phone comes back intact and threatens Chloe that it would victimize her mother next. Chloe runs out of the dressing and into the parking lot where she is confronted by someone before being run over by a car.

=== "Sarap" (Taste) ===
Ato is then seen in front of a Gothic-looking house, delivering food from his restaurant. It is raining hard and he is bothered by the odd behavior of the family. When he is forced to stay due to the bad weather, he seems more and more uncomfortable. The family is speaking about cannibalism. When the patriarch (Jason Gainza) arrives home, he asks Ato to help him carry a body bag inside the house. Reluctant and frightened about it, he goes along. He is relieved when the body bag turns out to contain a roasted pig.

Ato realizes that the family's youngest member was having a horror-themed birthday party, hence the creepiness he had felt. When the family start to eat the cake Ato made and delivered, they all feel sick and began to vomit, eventually dying. It is revealed that Ato deliberately poisoned them. Before he became a successful restaurant owner, he consults Santi for help. Santi gives him a small handbook with potion recipes, but makes him sign a contract stating that:

1. He must never tell anyone about the store;
2. He must take good care of the book and not destroy it; and
3. He must follow the recipes exactly as they are.

As with those before him, a slash appears on his hands.

He spikes the cake with poison, killing the family. The secret of his success is revealed to be that he uses human meat to serve his customers, adding concoctions from his book to make it special.

=== "Halimuyak" (Smell) ===
The scene jumps to a gay man named Pippa on an eyeball date with a good-looking man. Realizing Pipa is gay, he leaves him in rage. Pippa becomes conscious about how he looks and is always teased by men for his sexuality. He also ends up jealous with his sister Larra when Pippa's childhood crush Aldo harbors feelings for her.

One night, Pippa is accosted by drunk men. He comes across Santi's shop, who offers to help him. He gives him a bottle of perfume that will make him attractive to all men, but makes him sign a contract with the following terms that:

1. He must never tell anyone about the store;
2. He must take good care of the bottle and never destroy it; and
3. He must have one spray per day and never exceed.

Afterwards, Pippa is chased through town by handsome men. One day, he goes to a restaurant to meet with Chloe Narciso's Fans Club. Pippa then sees Ato (his high school classmate) talking to Odie about something important. Pippa then spots Maita in the restaurant with Chloe, confronting Natasha. As a big fan, Pippa asks Maita if he can have Chloe's autograph, to which Maita gladly obliges.

As time runs by, Pippa becomes abusive with his perfume, taking more than one spray a day, and has an army of men as slaves. Larra becomes worried about her brother. When Larra and Aldo (along with his other male friends) go out for the night, Pippa confronts them and pours all the perfume on himself; the men then become zombies and chase Pippa all around town. He is then cornered as dozens of zombies surrounded him.

=== "Kanti" (Touch) ===
After Maita and Chloe's fight in the dressing room, Maita returns to Santi's shop and asks him to help Chloe be herself again. Santi rebuffs her pleas and instead hands her an age-reversing cream, implying that what Maita really wants is to be beautiful again. She is asked to sign a contract that says:

1. She must never tell anyone about the store;
2. She must take good care of the cream and never destroy it; and
3. She must not overuse it.

It is revealed that Maita was the beautiful lady in the portrait Odie saw earlier. Her fame stopped when she was raped, with Chloe as the child. Maita, now looking young and beautiful, ventures into a bar to try and reconcile with Chloe. She is helped in by the man whom Pippa was seen with earlier. She completely forgets about Chloe and starts to party.

Suddenly, bugs begin bothering her skin. In fright, she runs out of the bar but is stopped by the good-looking man, who starts to sexually assault her. At the parking area, Odie comes to his senses and looks for Chloe. He sees her unconscious on the floor and shouts at the car driver to help him get Chloe to hospital. The driver is revealed to be Ato, who wants to make Chloe his next course in the restaurant. Ato points a gun at Odie and before he could kill him, a weak Chloe bludgeons Ato unconscious. Odie then accompanies Chloe to the hospital.

Meanwhile, Pippa, who is still being chased by the zombies, dives in the dumpster to hide his smell. As the zombies retreat, Pippa spots Maita being molested by the man. He saves Maita and recognize each other, having previously met at the restaurant. Pippa and Maita then go to the hospital and come across Odie and Chloe. Realizing they are all cursed by Santi, they decide to finish it once and for all.

Odie concludes that if they exchange their respective products from Santi's shop, they will be able to destroy it without harm. Odie gives Chloe his camera and receives her cellphone. Maita gives Pippa her cream and receives his perfume. The four confront Santi when Ato also arrives. Santi puts them all into a trance as he reveals himself to be the Devil and reveals that their lives are payment for the products they bought. Ato, not being a part of Odie's plan, is killed by Santi. Chloe is threatened by Santi but before he could kill her, Chloe destroys the camera. Her ears soon bleed. Pippa is almost killed by Santi when he impersonates Larra but Pippa destroys Maita's cream and escapes. Maita is then surrounded by thousands and thousands of bugs but destroys Pippa's perfume allowing her to escape as well. Odie is confronted by Santi. He smashes Chloe's phone before being stabbed in the eye. Odie, Chloe and Pippa destroy Santi's remaining merchandise while Maita sacrifices herself to burn the contracts and the store, killing her and Santi.

Sometime later, Chloe, now deaf, holds a press conference, with Pippa, who is now sensitive to smells, being her translator. After the conference, they met with a now blind Odie. As the three board Chloe's van, Santi, who is revealed to be alive, is seen in front of his closed store selling a new batch of items to another group of people.

== Cast ==
=== "Masid" (Sight) ===
- Vhong Navarro as Odie
- Rayver Cruz as Ato
- Alex Gonzaga as Chloe Narciso
- TJ Trinidad as Santi

=== "Dinig" (Hearing) ===
- Heaven Peralejo as Cesca
- Lotlot de Leon as Maita

=== "Sarap" (Taste) ===
- Jason Gainza as Patriarch

=== "Halimuyak" (Smell) ===
- John Lapus as Pippa
- Markki Stroem as the good-looking guy
- Cai Cortez as Larra
- Manuel Chua as Aldo

=== "Kanti" (Touch) ===
- Janine Gutierrez as Young Maita

== Awards ==
Award	Category	Recipient	Result
41st Metro Manila Film Festival	Best Picture	Buy Now, Die Later	Won (2nd place)
41st Metro Manila Film Festival	Best Float	Buy Now, Die Later	Won
41st Metro Manila Film Festival	Best Director	Randolph Longjas	Nominated
41st Metro Manila Film Festival	Best Supporting Actor	TJ Trinidad	Nominated
41st Metro Manila Film Festival	Best Supporting Actress	Lotlot De Leon	Nominated
41st Metro Manila Film Festival	Best Child Performer	Sol de Guzman	Nominated
41st Metro Manila Film Festival	Best Cinematography	Pong Ignacio	Nominated
41st Metro Manila Film Festival	Best Original Story	Ronald Allan Habon	Nominated
41st Metro Manila Film Festival	Best Editing	Carlo Manatad	Nominated
41st Metro Manila Film Festival	Best Production Design	Angel Diesta	Won
41st Metro Manila Film Festival	Best Visual Effects	John Kenneth Paclibar, Emman Bares, Raffy Legaspi & Jasper Bundoc	Nominated
41st Metro Manila Film Festival	Best Make-up Artist	Lei Ponce	Nominated
41st Metro Manila Film Festival	Best Musical Score	Jerrold Tarog	Nominated
41st Metro Manila Film Festival	Best Sound Engineering	Addiss Tabong	Nominated
18th Gawad PASADO Awards	PinakaPASADOng Katuwang na Aktres	Lotlot de Leon	Won

== See also ==
- List of ghost films
