= 2015 Metro Manila Film Festival =

2015 film festival edition

2015 Metro Manila Film Festival 41st Metro Manila Film Festival
- Awards: Gabi ng Parangal (lit. 'Awards Night')
- No. of films: 8
- Festival date: December 25, 2015 to January 7, 2016

MMFF chronology
- 42nd ed. 40th ed.

The 2015 Metro Manila Film Festival (MMFF) is the 41st edition of the annual Metro Manila Film Festival held in Metro Manila and throughout the Philippines. It is organized by the Metropolitan Manila Development Authority (MMDA), a government agency. During the festival, no foreign films are shown in Philippine theaters (except IMAX, 4D, and large format 3D theaters).

The festival began on December 23, 2015, kicking off with the traditional Parada ng mga Artista (Parade of the Stars) float parade from Mall of Asia in Pasay to Quirino Grandstand in Manila. Showings are from December 25 until January 7.

The Gabi ng Parangal (Awards Night) was held on December 27 at the Kia Theatre, Araneta Center, Quezon City, hosted by KC Concepcion and Richard Gutierrez. Both the Parade of Stars and the Awards Night are aired via delayed telecast on TV5 through a co-production with Viva Entertainment.

Metro Manila Film Festival reported that the total earnings of the festival was 1 billion pesos (December 25 – January 6 only). It did not report the earnings for each film.

This was the only festival under MMDA chairman Emerson Carlos.

The following were the criteria used in determining the final 8 entries:
1. Commercial viability (50.0%)
2. Story creativity, writing excellence, innovativeness and thematic values (40.0%)
3. Filipino cultural and/or historical value (10.0%)

== Entries ==
=== Regular entries ===
The official list of entries was announced on June 20, 2015. From the 21 submissions, 8 were chosen for the festival.

Title	Starring	Studio	Director	Genre
All You Need Is Pag-ibig	Kris Aquino, Derek Ramsay, Kim Chiu, Xian Lim, Jodi Sta. Maria, Ian Veneracion, Ronaldo Valdez, Pokwang, Nova Villa, Bimby Aquino-Yap, Julia Concio, Talia Concio	Star Cinema	Antoinette Jadaone	Romantic comedy
Beauty and the Bestie	Vice Ganda, Coco Martin, James Reid, Nadine Lustre	Star Cinema, Viva Films	Wenn V. Deramas	Comedy, action
Buy Now, Die Later	Vhong Navarro, John Lapus, Alex Gonzaga, TJ Trinidad, Rayver Cruz, Lotlot de Leon, Janine Gutierrez	Quantum Films, MJM Production, Tuko Film Productions, Buchi Boy Films	Randolph Longjas	Horror, comedy
Haunted Mansion	Janella Salvador, Marlo Mortel, Jerome Ponce	Regal Entertainment	Jun Lana	Horror, suspense, thriller
Honor Thy Father	John Lloyd Cruz, Meryll Soriano, Tirso Cruz III	Reality Entertainment	Erik Matti	Action, drama
My Bebe Love: #KiligPaMore	Vic Sotto, Ai-Ai delas Alas, Alden Richards, Maine Mendoza	OctoArts Films, M-Zet Productions, APT Entertainment, GMA Films, MEDA Productions	Jose Javier Reyes	Romantic comedy
Nilalang	Cesar Montano, Maria Ozawa	Haunted Tower Pictures, WeLovePost, Parallax Studios, Viva Films	Pedring Lopez	Horror, action, thriller, crime
#Walang Forever	Jennylyn Mercado, Jericho Rosales	Quantum Films, MJM Production, Tuko Film Productions, Buchi Boy Films	Dan Villegas	Romantic comedy

Additional note
- On October 23, 2015, Honor Thy Father, directed by Erik Matti and produced by Reality Entertainment, replaced Hermano Pule, which is directed by Gil Portes, after the latter withdrew from the festival due to lack of funding.

=== New Wave entries ===
==== Feature films ====
The New Wave entries were screened on selected cinemas from December 17 to 24, 2015.

Title	Starring	Studio	Director	Genre
ARI: My Life with a King	Ronwaldo Martin, Francisco Guinto	Holy Angel University, Center for Kapampangan Studies	Carlo Enciso Catu	Drama
Mandirigma	Luis Alandy, Pen Medina, Alwyn Uytingco, Mon Confiado	Starquest Alliance Productions, Blank Pages Productions	Arlyn Dela Cruz	Drama
Tandem	JM de Guzman, Nico Antonio	Quantum Films, Tuko Film Productions, Buchi Boy Films	King Palisoc	Drama, thriller
Toto	Sid Lucero	Toto SCM Production, Central Digital Lab	John Paul Su	Comedy, Drama
Turo-Turo	Albert Silos, AJ Dee	Handheld Entertainment Production	Ray An Dulay	Drama

==== Short films ====
- Daisy - Brian Reyes
- Ding Mangasyas (Tough Guys) - Justine Emmanuel Dizon
- Lapis - Maricel Cariaga
- Momento - Kyle Nieva
- Mumu - Che Tagyamon

==== Animated films ====
- 8 - Johanna Kay Boncodin
- Buttons- Marvel Obemio, Francis Ramirez & Jared Garcia
- Geo - John Aurthur Mercader
- Little Lights - Rivelle Mallari
- Marvino's League of Superheroes - Ja Marti Escandor

== Awards ==
2015 Metro Manila Film Festival Gabi ng Parangal
- Date: December 27, 2015
- Site: Kia Theatre, Quezon City

Highlights
- Best Picture: #Walang Forever
- Most awards: #Walang Forever (6)

Television coverage
- Network: TV5

=== Major awards ===
Winners are listed first, highlighted with boldface and indicated with a double dagger (‡). Nominees are also listed if applicable.

Best Picture	Best Director
**#Walang Forever – Quantum Films, MJM Production, Tuko Film Productions,** **Buchi Boy Films**‡; Buy Now, Die Later – Quantum Films, MJM Production, Tuko Film Productions, Buchi Boy Films (2nd Best Picture); My Bebe Love: #KiligPaMore – OctoArts Films, M-Zet Productions, APT Entertainment, GMA Films, MEDA Productions (3rd Best Picture)	**Erik Matti – Honor Thy Father**‡; Antoinette Jadaone – All You Need Is Pag-ibig; Randolph Longjas – Buy Now, Die Later; Jose Javier Reyes – My Bebe Love: #KiligPaMore; Dan Villegas – #Walang Forever
Best Actor	Best Actress
**Jericho Rosales – #Walang Forever**‡; John Lloyd Cruz – Honor Thy Father; Ian Veneracion – All You Need Is Pag-ibig	**Jennylyn Mercado – #Walang Forever**‡; Ai-Ai delas Alas – My Bebe Love: #KiligPaMore; Meryll Soriano – Honor Thy Father; Jodi Sta. Maria – All You Need Is Pag-ibig
Best Supporting Actor	Best Supporting Actress
**Tirso Cruz III – Honor Thy Father**‡; Dido de la Paz – Nilalang; Pepe Herrera – #Walang Forever; TJ Trinidad – Buy Now, Die Later; Alden Richards – My Bebe Love: #KiligPaMore	**Maine Mendoza – My Bebe Love: #KiligPaMore**‡; Iza Calzado – Haunted Mansion; Lotlot De Leon – Buy Now, Die Later; Kim Molina – #Walang Forever; Nova Villa – All You Need Is Pag-ibig
Best Child Performer	Best Cinematography
**Krystal Brimner – Honor Thy Father**‡; Sol de Guzman – Buy Now, Die Later; Alonzo Muhlach – Beauty and the Bestie; Marco Masa – Beauty and the Bestie; Julia & Talia Concio – All You Need Is Pag-ibig	**Pao Orendain – Nilalang**‡; Hermann Claravall – All You Need Is Pag-ibig; Ber Cruz – Honor Thy Father; Mackie Galvez – #Walang Forever; Pong Ignacio – Buy Now, Die Later
Best Screenplay	Best Original Story
**Paul Sta. Ana – #Walang Forever**‡; Michiko Yamamoto – Honor Thy Father; Jose Javier Reyes – My Bebe Love: #KiligPaMore	**Dan Villegas & Antoinette Jadaone – #Walang Forever**‡; Michiko Yamamoto & Erik Matti – Honor Thy Father; Bibeth Orteza – My Bebe Love: #KiligPaMore; Ronald Allan Habon – Buy Now, Die Later
Best Production Design	Best Editing
**Angel Diesta – Buy Now, Die Later**‡; Shari Marie Montiague – All You Need Is Pag-ibig; Ericson Navarro – Honor Thy Father; Jerann Ordinario – Haunted Mansion; Mimi Sanson Viola – Nilalang	**Jason Cahapay – Nilalang**‡; Marya Ignacio – #Walang Forever; Carlo Manatad – Buy Now, Die Later; Benjamin Tolentino – All You Need Is Pag-ibig
Best Visual Effects	Best Make-up Artist
**Pedro Chuidian & Rommel Pambid – Nilalang**‡; Imaginary Friends – Haunted Mansion; John Kenneth Paclibar, Emman Bares, Raffy Legaspi & Jasper Bundoc – Buy Now, Die Later	**Ryan Panaligan & Erika Racela – Honor Thy Father**‡; Richard Carvajal & Alice Soro Collara – Nilalang; Lei Ponce – Buy Now, Die Later
Best Original Theme Song	Best Musical Score
**"Tao" from Honor Thy Father**‡; "All You Need Is Pag-ibig" from All You Need Is Pag-ibig; "Greyhoundz Lions" from Nilalang	**Jessie Lasaten – Nilalang**‡; Vincent de Jesus – My Bebe Love: #KiligPaMore; Erwin Romulo – Honor Thy Father; Jerrold Tarog – Buy Now, Die Later; Emerson Texon – #Walang Forever
Best Sound Engineering	Gatpuno Antonio J. Villegas Cultural Award
**Ditoy Aguila – Nilalang**‡; Mikka Quizon – Honor Thy Father; Addiss Tabong – Buy Now, Die Later; Addiss Tabong – #Walang Forever; Wild Sound – My Bebe Love: #KiligPaMore	**My Bebe Love: #KiligPaMore**‡
Best Float	Fernando Poe Jr. Memorial Award for Excellence
**Buy Now, Die Later**‡	**#Walang Forever**‡

==== Other awards ====
- Plaque of Appreciation – **Francis Tolentino**
- Male Celebrity of the Night – **Cesar Montano**
- Female Celebrity of the Night – **Jennylyn Mercado**

=== New Wave category ===
The following are the winners of the New Wave category:

- Best Picture – **ARI: My Life with a King**
- Best Director – **John Paul Su, Toto**
- Best Actor – **JM de Guzman, Tandem** & **Francisco Guinto, ARI: My Life with a King**
- Best Supporting Actor – **Thou Reyes, Toto**
- Best Supporting Actress – **Bibeth Orteza, Toto**
- Best Screenplay – **Robert Tantingco, ARI: My Life with a King**
- Special Jury Prize – **Toto**
- Manila Bulletin Entertainment Best Picture – **ARI: My Life with a King**
- Best Short Film – **Mumu by Jean Cheryl Tagyamon**
- Short Film Special Jury Prize – **Daisy by Brian Reyes**
- Manila Bulletin Entertainment Best Short Film – **Momento by Jan-Kyle Nieva**
- Best Animation Film – **Buttons by Marvel Obemio, Francis Ramirez & Jared Garcia**
- Animation Film Special Jury Prize – **Lights Lights by Rivelle Mallari**
- Manila Bulletin Entertainment Best Animation Film – **Geo by John Aurthur Mercader**

== Multiple awards ==
=== Mainstream ===
Awards	Film
6	#Walang Forever
5	Nilalang
5	Honor Thy Father
3	Buy Now, Die Later
3	My Bebe Love: #KiligPaMore
2	All You Need is Pag-ibig

=== New Wave ===
Awards	Film
4	ARI: My Life with a King
4	Toto

== Controversies ==
=== Ticket-swapping incidents ===
Alleged ticket-swapping incidents occurred in some branches of SM Cinema during the opening day of the festival. Some moviegoers claimed that they bought tickets for My Bebe Love but instead, were given tickets for Beauty and the Bestie. SM Cinema confirmed through its Twitter account that this incident occurred in SM City Bacoor. According to SM Cinema, the incident was "a mistake due to high volume of tickets purchased". They also assured the public that this transaction will be counted fairly for the gross sales of My Bebe Love. These tweets were later deleted for unknown reasons.

On the other hand, the Metro Manila Film Festival committee released a contrary statement regarding this issue. It is stated that they "strongly denies the existence of such" incident and they called the issue "baseless".

The House committee on Metro Manila Development, chaired by Quezon City Representative Winston Castelo, started the probe on the disqualification case of Honor Thy Father and the ticket-swapping incidents in January 2016.

=== Honor Thy Father disqualification ===
On December 26, Honor Thy Father, was disqualified by the Metro Manila Film Festival Executive Committee from the Best Picture category after the film failed to disclose its participation as the opening film of the 2015 Cinema One Originals Film Festival. On the contrary, Dondon Monteverde, the film's producer, revealed that they did disclose this information beforehand. He attested that its premiere at the Cinema One festival didn't generate revenue which complies by the rules. He also questioned the timing of this decision, one day before the awards ceremony, and he demanded an investigation.

In an interview dated on November 2, 2015, MMFF Executive Committee member Dominic Du revealed to Philippine Entertainment Portal that the film did comply with the rules as the Cinema One premiere wasn't a commercial screening.

On December 28, Laguna Representative Dan Fernandez, who is part of the cast of Honor Thy Father, filed a resolution that directs the House of Representatives to conduct an inquiry regarding the disqualification of Honor Thy Father. The committee on Metro Manila Development, chaired by Quezon City Representative Winston Castelo, started the probe on the disqualification case of Honor Thy Father and the ticket-swapping incidents in January 2016.

=== Pullout of Nilalang and Honor Thy Father from some cinemas ===
Nilalang director Pedring Lopez and co-producer Wesley Villarica expressed dismay over the pullout of their film and co-entrant film, Honor thy Father from some cinemas in favor of My Bebe Love. Villarica noted that his film, was shown in 20 cinemas in Metro Manila and seven theaters outside the metropolis in the opening day on December 25, but by next day less than 20 cinemas are screening his film. Honor Thy Father writer Michiko Yamamoto said that her film was pulled out from ten theaters the day after the opening day of the festival.

=== Conflict of interest against Dominic Du ===
During the House probe on the MMFF irregularities, it was revealed that Dominic Du, a member of the MMFF Executive Committee, had a conflict of interest with the Best Picture winner, #Walang Forever and 2nd Best Picture winner, Buy Now, Die Later. Dominic Du owns the company, Axinite Digicinema, that helped promote the said two films. He also serves as a legal counsel of Joji Alonso, the producer of both films.

== Box office gross ==
The Metropolitan Manila Development Authority was criticized for not releasing official earnings of each film. This led to some film studios releasing their own earnings.

Entry	Gross ticket sales	
Entry	December 27	January 7
Beauty and the Bestie	₱ 131,000,000	₱ 428,000,000*
My Bebe Love	₱ 159,000,000	₱ 385,000,000*
#Walang Forever	₱ 36,000,000	–
Haunted Mansion	₱ 29,000,000	–
	TOTAL	₱ 1,020,000,000

Preceded by 2014 Metro Manila Film Festival	Metro Manila Film Festival; 2015	Succeeded by 2016 Metro Manila Film Festival
