= 1975 Metro Manila Film Festival =

Annual Philippine Festival edition

1975 Metropolitan Film Festival
- Date: September 21, 1975 to September 30, 1975
- Site: Manila

Highlights
- Best Picture: Diligin Mo ng Hamog ang Uhaw Na Lupa
- Most awards: Diligin Mo ng Hamog ang Uhaw Na Lupa (6)

The 1st Metropolitan Film Festival (later the Metro Manila Film Festival) was held on September 21, 1975, in Manila to commemorate the third anniversary of martial law and President Ferdinand Marcos' New Society program. Board of Censors chief Guillermo de Vega served as chairman of the festival's executive committee, with actor Joseph Estrada as co-chairman and the mayors of Metropolitan Manila as vice chairmen.

The film Diligin Mo ng Hamog ang Uhaw Na Lupa received most of the 1975 awards, winning six major awards including the Dangal ng Bagong Lipunan and Best Actor for Estrada. Batu-Bato sa Langit and Kapitan Kulas came in second and third respectively. The feature film Araw-Araw, Gabi-Gabi won one award, Best Actress for Charito Solis.

Nora Aunor's entry, NV Productions' Batu-Bato sa Langit (directed by Luciano B. Carlos), won as 3rd Best Picture. Vilma Santos, on the other hand, gave a notable performance in Roma Films' Karugtong ang Kahapon.

== Entries ==
Title	Starring	Studio	Director	Genre
Alat!	Tony Ferrer, George Estregan, Chanda Romero, Suzanne Gonzales	Tagalog Ilang-Ilang Productions	Pierre Salas	Action
Araw-Araw, Gabi-Gabi	Charito Solis, Tony Santos, Sr., Rosanna Ortiz, Dindo Fernando	Premiere Productions	Danilo Cabreira	Drama
Batu-Bato sa Langit (Ang Tamaa'y Huwag Magagalit..!)	Nora Aunor, Christopher de Leon, Nida Blanca	N.V. Productions	Luciano B. Carlos	Romance, Comedy
Diligin mo ng Hamog ang Uhaw na Lupa	Joseph Estrada, Gloria Diaz	JE Productions	Augusto Buenaventura	Action
Kapitan Kulas	Ramon Revilla, Sr., Elizabeth Oropesa, Helen Gamboa, Walter Navarro	Lea Productions	Romy Suzara	Action, Drama
Karugtong ang Kahapon	Vilma Santos, Edgar Mortiz, Eddie Garcia, Gloria Romero, Celia Rodriguez	Roma Films	Fely Crisostomo	Drama, Romance
Postcards from China	Dante Rivero, Boots Anson-Roa, Pilar Pilapil	Lyra Ventures	Cesar Gallardo	Romance
Siya'y Umalis, Siya'y Dumating	Marlene Dauden, Nestor de Villa	Mirick Films	Mitos Villarreal	Drama

== Awards ==
Winners are listed first, highlighted with boldface and indicated with a double dagger (‡). Nominees are also listed if applicable.

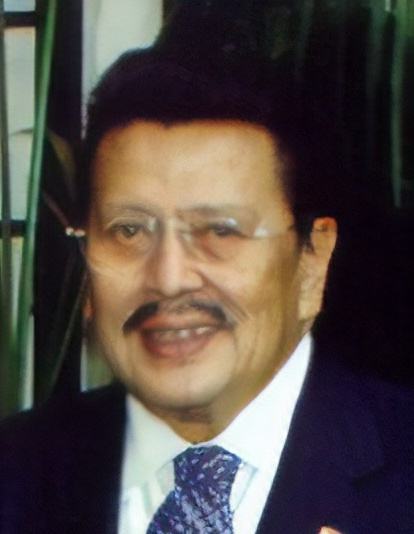
Joseph Estrada, Best Actor winner

Dangal ng Bagong Lipunan	Best Director
**Diligin Mo ng Hamog ang Uhaw Na Lupa – JE Productions**‡; Batu-Bato sa Langit – NV Productions (3rd)	**Augusto Buenaventura – Diligin Mo ng Hamog ang Uhaw Na Lupa**‡
Best Actor	Best Actress
**Joseph Estrada – Diligin Mo ng Hamog ang Uhaw Na Lupa**‡	**Charito Solis – Araw-Araw, Gabi-Gabi**‡
Best Supporting Actor	Best Supporting Actress
**Vic Silayan – Diligin Mo ng Hamog ang Uhaw Na Lupa**‡	**Nida Blanca – Batu-Bato sa Langit**‡
Best Screenplay	Best Story
**Luciano Carlos – Batu-Bato sa Langit**‡	**Ophelia San Juan – Kapitan Kulas**‡
Best Cinematography	Best Editing
**Nonong Rasca – Kapitan Kulas**‡	**Edgardo Vinarao – Diligin Mo ng Hamog ang Uhaw Na Lupa**‡
Best Music	Best Sound
**George Canseco – Batu-Bato sa Langit**‡	**Manuel Daves – Diligin Mo ng Hamog ang Uhaw Na Lupa**‡

== Multiple awards ==
Awards	Film
6	Diligin Mo ng Hamog ang Uhaw Na Lupa
4	Batu-Bato sa Langit
2	Kapitan Kulas

Preceded by none	Metro Manila Film Festival; 1975	Succeeded by 1976 Metro Manila Film Festival
