= WalangForever =

- Theatrical release poster
- Directed by: Dan Villegas
- Written by: Paul Sta. Ana
- Produced by: Joji Alonso; Edgar Mangahas; Fernando Ortigas; E.A. Rocha
- Starring: Jennylyn Mercado; Jericho Rosales
- Cinematography: Mackie Galvez
- Edited by: Marya Ignacio
- Music by: Emerzon Texon
- Production companies: MJM Productions; Tuko Film Productions; Buchi Boy Films
- Distributed by: Quantum Films; Star Cinema
- Release date: December 25, 2015
- Running time: 119 minutes
- Country: Philippines
- Language: Filipino
- Box office: ₱100 million

#WalangForever (lit. 'There's No Forever') is a 2015 Filipino romantic comedy film starring Jennylyn Mercado and Jericho Rosales. It is an official entry to the 2015 Metro Manila Film Festival and was shown on December 25, 2015.

JM de Guzman was supposed to be the lead actor opposite Mercado but pulled out of the film due to personal problems. This is Mercado's seventh MMFF entry after her 2014 award-winning film entry, English Only, Please.

== Plot ==
Mia, a celebrated writer of romantic-comedy films, is at a turning point in her life which makes it difficult for her to believe that love could last. Everything comes to a head when Ethan returns, only for her to find out that he has become a cynic of lasting love because she broke his heart.

== Cast ==
=== Main cast ===
- Jericho Rosales as Ethan Isaac
- Jennylyn Mercado as Mia Nolasco-Isaac

=== Supporting cast ===
- Pepe Herrera as Aldus
- Kim Molina as Luli
- Lorna Tolentino as Betchay Nolasco
- Phoemela Baranda; cameo appearance
- Sebastian Castro; cameo appearance
- Jerald Napoles as Tonypet
- Jane Oineza; cameo appearance
- Khalil Ramos; cameo appearance
- Jon Lucas; cameo appearance
- Michelle Vito; cameo appearance
- Yves Flores; cameo appearance
- Matet de Leon; cameo appearance
- Melai Cantiveros; cameo appearance
- Jason Francisco; cameo appearance
- Julian Estrada; cameo appearance
- Sofia Andres; cameo appearance
- Sid Lucero; cameo appearance
- Liza Diño; cameo appearance
- Maja Salvador; cameo appearance
- Derek Ramsay; cameo appearance
- Patrick Sugui; cameo appearance
- Cai Cortez; cameo appearance
- Nico Antonio; cameo appearance

=== Extended cast ===
- Cathy Garcia-Molina as herself
- Carlo Aquino
- Rustica Carpio
- Irma Adlawan
- Alynna Asistio
- Juan Miguel Severo
- Myke Salomon (DJ Myke)

== Production ==
Scenes were shot in Taiwan.

== Awards ==
Award	Category	Recipient	Result
41st Metro Manila Film Festival	Best Picture	#WalangForever	Won
41st Metro Manila Film Festival	Fernando Poe Jr. Memorial Award for Excellence	#WalangForever	Won
41st Metro Manila Film Festival	Best Director	Dan Villegas	Nominated
41st Metro Manila Film Festival	Best Actor	Jericho Rosales	Won
41st Metro Manila Film Festival	Best Actress	Jennylyn Mercado	Won
41st Metro Manila Film Festival	Best Supporting Actor	Pepe Herrera	Nominated
41st Metro Manila Film Festival	Best Supporting Actress	Kim Molina	Nominated
41st Metro Manila Film Festival	Best Cinematography	Mackie Galvez	Nominated
41st Metro Manila Film Festival	Best Screenplay	Paul Sta. Ana	Won
41st Metro Manila Film Festival	Best Original Story	Dan Villegas & Antoinette Jadaone	Won
41st Metro Manila Film Festival	Best Editing	Marya Ignacio	Nominated
41st Metro Manila Film Festival	Best Musical Score	Emerson Texon	Nominated
41st Metro Manila Film Festival	Best Sound Engineering	Addiss Tabong	Nominated
