= 1983 Metro Manila Film Festival =

Film festival edition

- Date: December 25, 1983 to January 3, 1984
- Site: Manila

Highlights
- Best Picture: Karnal
- Most awards: Bago Kumalat ang Kamandag (6)

Television coverage
- Network: MBS

The 9th Metro Manila Film Festival was held in 1983, with only eight films presented.

Cine Suerte's Karnal won the Best Picture and four other awards. The major individual awards, however, was garnered by Lea Productions' Bago Kumalat ang Kamandag including Best Actor and Best Actress for Anthony Alonzo and Coney Reyes respectively, Best Director and Best Screenplay for Willie Milan among others. Other awardees include the films Hot Property and Tengteng de Sarapen.

RVQ Productions' Tengteng de Sarapen was the top grosser of the festival.

== Entries ==
Title	Starring	Studio	Director	Genre
Bad Bananas sa Puting Tabing	Christopher de Leon, Edgar Mortiz, Jay Ilagan, Johnny Delgado, Nora Aunor, Jaime Fabregas, Larry Lawrence	Vanguard Films	Peque Gallaga	Adventure, comedy
Bago Kumalat ang Kamandag	Anthony Alonzo, Coney Reyes, Eddie Garcia, Perla Bautista, Alicia Alonzo	Lea Productions	Willie Milan	Action
D'Godson	Niño Muhlach, William Martinez, Susan Bautista, Panchito, Pepe Pimentel, Nanette Inventor, Manny Luna, Rodolfo 'Boy' Garcia, Bayani Casimiro, Jimmy Santos, Palito, Joaquin Fajardo, Fred Panopio	D'Wonder Films	J. Erastheo Navoa	Action, Comedy
Gunfighter	Lito Lapid, Connie Angeles, Chuck Biller, Cole Mackay, Paul Jones, Marlene Chavez, Brad Fletcher	APG Films	Romy Suzara	Action, Western
Hot Property	Carmi Martin, Phillip Salvador, Dennis Roldan, Vic Diaz, Tony Santos, Sr.	Golden Dragon Films	Lino Brocka	Drama
Karnal	Charito Solis, Phillip Salvador, Vic Silayan, Joel Torre, Cecille Castillo	Cine Suerte	Marilou Diaz-Abaya	Drama
Over My Dead Body	Tony Ferrer, Efren Reyes, Jr., Bembol Roco, Raoul Aragon, Anna Marie Gutierrez, Lolita Marquez	Sunfilms International	Arsenio 'Boots' Bautista	Action
Tengteng De Sarapen	Dolphy, Alma Moreno, Panchito, Jaypee de Guzman, Raoul Aragonn, Bayani Casimiro, Teroy de Guzman, Palito, Ben David, Rocco Montalban, Larry Silva, Allan Bautista, Max Vera	RVQ Productions	Frank Gray, Jr.	Comedy

== Winners and nominees ==
=== Awards ===
Winners are listed first and highlighted in boldface.

Best Film	Best Director
**Karnal**; Bago Kumalat ang Kamandag; Hot Property	Willie Milan – Bago Kumalat ang Kamandag
Best Actor	Best Actress
**Anthony Alonzo – Bago Kumalat ang Kamandag**	Coney Reyes – Bago Kumalat ang Kamandag
Best Supporting Actor	Best Supporting Actress
**Dennis Roldan – Hot Property**	Alicia Alonzo – Bago Kumalat ang Kamandag
Best Sound Engineering	Best Cinematography
**Rudy Baldovino – Karnal**	Manolo Abaya – Karnal
Best Editing	Best Music
**Augusto Salvador – Bago Kumalat ang Kamandag**	William Yusi – Hot Property
Best Art Direction	Best Screenplay
**Fiel Zabat – Karnal**	Willie Milan and Ronnie Paredes – Bago Kumalat ang Kamandag
Best Child Performer
**Jaypee de Guzman and Ben Pelayo – Teng Teng de Sarapen**

== Multiple awards ==
Awards	Film
6	Bago Kumalat ang Kamandag
4	Karnal
2	Hot Property

== Controversies ==
In August 1983, American political advisor Jack Valenti, head of the Motion Picture Association of America (MPAA), requested that the festival be moved from December to November, lest the MPAA refrain from attending the 1984 edition of the Manila International Film Festival. His request was criticized by members of the Philippine film industry, with one producer arguing that November is often a time when film attendance is at its lowest in the country.

During the awards night, many were surprised after Coney Reyes won the Best Actress award for the film Bago Kumalat ang Dugo and Anthony Alonzo is given the Best Actor award for the same film, besting acting greats Charito Solis, Phillip Salvador, and Vic Silayan, who were all in the film Karnal. In addition, juror's standards of giving Willie Milan the Best Director award against Lino Brocka is questioned.

Preceded by 1982 Metro Manila Film Festival	Metro Manila Film Festival; 1983	Succeeded by 1984 Metro Manila Film Festival
