= All You Need Is Pag-ibig =

- Theatrical film poster
- Directed by: Antoinette Jadaone
- Screenplay by: Kriz Gazmen; Antoinette Jadaone; Yoshke Dimen
- Story by: Antoinette Jadaone; Yoshke Dimen
- Produced by: Charo Santos-Concio; Malou N. Santos
- Starring: Kris Aquino; Derek Ramsay; Kim Chiu; Xian Lim; Jodi Sta. Maria; Ian Veneracion; Ronaldo Valdez; Pokwang; Nova Villa
- Cinematography: Hermann Claravall
- Edited by: Benjamin Tolentino
- Music by: Carmina Cuya
- Production company: ABS-CBN Film Productions, Inc.
- Distributed by: Star Cinema
- Release date: December 25, 2015
- Running time: 119 minutes
- Country: Philippines
- Languages: Filipino; English
- Box office: ₱37 million

All You Need is Pag-ibig (lit. 'All You Need is Love') is a 2015 Filipino Family romantic comedy film directed by Antoinette Jadaone and released by Star Cinema. As their official entry to 2015 Metro Manila Film Festival. It stars an ensemble cast including Kris Aquino, Bimby Aquino Yap, Derek Ramsay, Kim Chiu, Xian Lim, Ronaldo Valdez, Nova Villa, Pokwang, Jodi Sta. Maria and Ian Veneracion.

The film was controversial due to several changes in the story and casting, much to the disappointment of fans. The film was a flop and was pulled out in most theaters days after its release, earning only $37 million and finished 5th out of 8 in the MMFF race.

== Cast ==
=== Main Cast ===
- Kris Aquino as Love
- Derek Ramsay as Dom
- Kim Chiu as Anya
- Xian Lim as Dino
- Jodi Sta. Maria as Mel
- Ian Veneracion as Eric
- Ronaldo Valdez as Jaime
- Pokwang as Corina
- Nova Villa as Loisa
- Bimby Aquino Yap as Jake
- Julia Concio as Hannah
- Talia Concio as Kelsey
- Neri Naig as Ellen
- Maricar Reyes as Sandra
- Agot Isidro as Jessica
- Allen Dizon as Alex
- Candy Pangilinan as Grace/Mel's Eldest Sister
- Shy Carlos as Tara
- Karen Dematera as Dianne
- Trina Legaspi
- Eslove Briones
- John Bermudo
- Via Antonio
- Ruby Ruiz

== Production ==
=== Pre-production ===
The film undergone a lot of complicated situations, it was first announced in June 2015 with its original working title, Mr. & Mrs. Split that is to be starred by Kris Aquino, Bimby Aquino Yap and Herbert Bautista until in September 2015 it was changed again into Pamilyang Lab Luv Love until weeks after, the production team already confirmed it as All You Need Is Pag-Ibig which adds Kim Chiu and Xian Lim with the cast. In early October 2015, reports were said that the movie will not push through with Aquino citing personal and health reasons. Reports also said that the movie will push through but this time Bautista will not be part of the film. Rumours then spread that phenomenal loveteam Jodi Sta. Maria and Richard Yap would instead lead the movie, marking their big onscreen reunion which delighted their fans here and abroad. However, in late October 2015, drastic changes were made due to Aquino's decision to do the movie. It was announced that Herbert Bautista will be replaced by Derek Ramsay, with additional casts Julia and Talia Concio.

== Casting ==
The film was announced in June 2015 as one of two entries of Star Cinema in the annual Metro Manila Film Festival together with its cast members Kris Aquino, Herbert Bautista, Bimby Aquino Yap and Jana Agoncillo. However the film undergo complication with its cast members Aquino and Bautista leading the film to be shelved. In October 23, the final casting was announced. Kris Aquino and Bimby Aquino Yap remain in the film while Herbert Bautista was replaced by Derek Ramsay and Jana Agoncillo was replaced by Talia Concio. In addition, Kim Chiu, Xian Lim, Jodi Sta Maria and Ian Veneracion completes the final cast members.

== Release ==
All You Need Is Pag-Ibig was released in Philippine theaters on December 25, 2015, as an official entry to the 2015 Metro Manila Film Festival. It ranked only 5th in the MMFF race out of the 8 movies and was pulled out in most theaters only a few days after its release.

== Awards ==
Award	Category	Recipient	Result
41st Metro Manila Film Festival	Best Director	Antoinette Jadaone	Nominated
41st Metro Manila Film Festival	Best Actor	Ian Veneracion	Nominated
41st Metro Manila Film Festival	Best Actress	Jodi Sta. Maria	Nominated
41st Metro Manila Film Festival	Best Supporting Actress	Nova Villa	Nominated
41st Metro Manila Film Festival	Best Child Performers	Julia & Talia Concio	Nominated
41st Metro Manila Film Festival	Best Sound Department	Nicholai Policarpio Minion	Nominated
41st Metro Manila Film Festival	Best Cameramen	Joel Casaul	Nominated
41st Metro Manila Film Festival	Best Cinematography	Gary Gardoce	Won
41st Metro Manila Film Festival	Best Cinematography	Hermann Claravall	Nominated
41st Metro Manila Film Festival	Best Editing	Benjamin Tolentino	Nominated
41st Metro Manila Film Festival	Best Original Theme Song	"All You Need Is Pag-Ibig"	Nominated
41st Metro Manila Film Festival	Best Production Design	Shari Marie Montiague	Nominated
41st Metro Manila Film Festival	Best Writer	Patrick John Valencia	Won
41st Metro Manila Film Festival	Best Art Director	Ana Lou Sanchez	Nominated
