= Meryll Soriano =

Filipino actress (born 1982)

- Born: Mary Rosalind Soriano Revillame; December 9, 1982 (age 43); Muntinlupa, Metro Manila, Philippines
- Occupation: Actress
- Years active: 1986–present
- Agents: ABS-CBN Corporation (1997–2002; 2004–2014; 2017–present); GMA Network (2003; 2015–2016; 2022; 2024–present)
- Spouse: Bernard Palanca (m. 2006; ann. 2015)
- Partner: Joem Bascon
- Children: 2
- Father: Willie Revillame
- Relatives: Maricel Soriano (aunt)

Mary Rosalind Soriano Revillame (Tagalog pronunciation: [soɾˌjaː.no ɾɛˌbiːl.jɐˈmɛ]; born December 9, 1982), known professionally as Meryll Soriano, is a Filipino actress.

== Career ==
Soriano started acting as a child star during the early '90s appearing in "The Maricel Soriano Drama Special", which was top-billed by her aunt Maricel Soriano, and her mom Maria Victoria Soriano as executive producer. Soriano acted in movies such as Nasaan Ka Nang Kailangan Kita (1996) with Judy Ann Santos and Wowie de Guzman, and Computer Kombat (1997) with Aiza Seguerra. She also appeared in GMA's TV series Sana ay Ikaw na Nga (2001–2003) with Tanya Garcia and Dingdong Dantes, ABS-CBN's fantasy series Marina (2004) with Claudine Barretto, and Super Inggo (2006–2007) with Makisig Morales.

In 2014, she appeared on Honesto in a guest role, and later became part of the cast of Ikaw Lamang with Coco Martin, Julia Montes, Kim Chiu and Jake Cuenca.

In 2015, she returned to GMA Network after 10 years of stay with ABS-CBN to play a major antagonist role in My Mother's Secret. She made a guest appearance in Little Nanay and a supporting role in That's My Amboy. She then appeared in Dear Uge and Wagas.

In 2017, she came back on ABS-CBN and joined the horror-fantasy drama series La Luna Sangre, as Greta Lumakad. She later joined the main cast of the 2019 TV series Starla.

In 2022 and since 2024, she concurrently works with ABS-CBN and GMA.

== Personal life ==
She is the daughter of actor and TV host Willie Revillame and Bec-Bec Soriano. She is the niece of actress and The Diamond Star Maricel Soriano.

She was married to actor Bernard Palanca on September 8, 2006. They broke up five months later when she was pregnant. On August 27, 2007, Soriano gave birth to their son, Elijah Pineda (6.5 lb (2.9 kg), 10:01 a.m.) at Makati Medical Center. Soriano and Joem Bascon became partners in 2008, and separated but reunited in 2019. On January 1, 2021, Soriano introduced her 2nd baby with Bascon. Baby Gido was born on New Year's Eve 2020 and was Baptized in December 2021.

Sorianos' half-siblings include Juamee, Willie Revillame's son with ex-wife Liz Almoro and Marimonte, Willie's daughter with Sharon Viduya and sisters, Kei and Ken, Becbec's children with Papa Gu.

She suffered from 2007 postpartum depression and underwent treatment on drug use during pregnancy with her eldest. She has also been diagnosed with bipolar disorder.

== Filmography ==
=== Film ===
- John en Marsha '86: TNT sa Amerika (1986) credited as Meryll Revillame
- Rocky Plus V (1991)
- Buddy en Sol (Sine Ito) (1992)
- Si Lucio at si Miguel: Hihintayin Kayo sa Langit (1992)
- Guwapings Dos (1993)
- Kung Kaya Mo, Kaya Ko Rin (1996)
- Da Best In The West 2: Da Western Pulis Stori (1996)
- Elena's Redemption (1996)
- Nasaan Ka ng Kailangan Kita (1996)
- Computer Kombat (1997)
- Kahit Minsan Lang (1997)
- Labs Kita, Okey Ka Lang (1998)
- Room Boy (2005)
- Bagong Agos (2005)
- Goodbye My Shooting Star (2006)
- In da Red Corner (2006)
- Rotonda (2006)
- Rekados (2006)
- Numbalikdiwa (2006)
- Ploning (2008)
- Voices (2008)
- Concerto (2008)
- Kamoteng Kahoy (2009)
- Irene and Jordan (2009)
- Pinoy Sunday (2009)
- Donor (2010)
- Sapi (2013)
- Honor Thy Father (2015)
- John Denver Trending (2019)
- Lola Igna (2019)
- Culion (2019)
- Angkas (2022)
- Lolo and the Kid (2024)
- Sunshine (2024)
- 2 Valid IDs (2026)

=== Television ===
Year	Title	Role
1997–2001	Kaya ni Mister, Kaya ni Misis	Betchay
1997–2002	!Oka Tokat	Sofia Mendez
2001	Mary D' Potter	Geri
2001	Sana ay Ikaw na Nga	Esme
2004	Marina	Luna Raymundo
2004	Wazzup Wazzup	Estrella
2005	Kampanerang Kuba	Sister Cecilia
2006	Your Song Presents: Upside Down	
2006–2007	Super Inggo	Super Inday
2007	Super Inggo 1.5: Ang Bagong Bangis	Super Inday
2008	I Love Betty La Fea	Maria Rosario "Rose" Sanchez
2010	Noah	young Sarah Perez
2010	Midnight DJ: Mga Pamahiin sa Patay	Emmanuelle Mata
2013	Wansapanataym: OMG! Oh My Genius!	
2013	Maalaala Mo Kaya: Elevator	Cheridel Alejandrino
2014	Honesto	Elsa
2014	Ikaw Lamang	Guadalupe "Lupe" Roque
2015	My Mother's Secret	Stella Pastor
2016	Little Nanay	Judith Fajardo
2016	That's My Amboy	Divine / Ms. D
2016	Dear Uge	Jenny
2016	Wagas: Lilia Cuntapay	
2017–2018	La Luna Sangre	Greta Lumakad
2019–2020	Starla	Ester Rivera
2020	24/7	Cristina
2020	Paano Kita Mapasasalamatan?	Baby Cerdena
2021	Maalaala Mo Kaya: Jacket	Larcy Faraon
2022–2023	The Iron Heart	Juno Suárez
2022; 2024	Family Feud	Herself
2025	TiktoClock	Herself
2025	Magpakailanman	The Charm and John Rey Love Story
2025	Love At First Spike	Carmen Nolasco
2025	Incognito	Secretary Josephine Ella Barrios
2025	It's Okay to Not Be Okay	Tessie Gonzales
2025	Maalaala Mo Kaya: Medal	Coach Jetlee
2025	Fast Talk with Boy Abunda	Herself
2026	Delivery Boi	Edna Ragasa-Maniego

== Awards and nominations ==
Year	Award	Category	Work	Result
2005	1st Cinemalaya Independent Film Festival	Best Actress	Room Boy	Won
2006	3rd ENPRESS Golden Screen Awards	Best Performance by an Actress in a Leading Role (Drama)	Room Boy	Nominated
2007	30th Gawad Urian Awards	Best Supporting Actress (Pinakamahusay na Pangalawang Aktres)	Rotonda	Won
2007	4th ENPRESS Golden Screen Awards	Best Performance by an Actress in a Supporting Role (Drama, Musical or Comedy)	Rotonda	Nominated
2010	6th Cinemalaya Independent Film Festival	Best Actress for Director's Showcase	Donor	Won
2010	37th Brussels International Independent Film Festival	Best Actress	Donor	Won
2011	34th Gawad Urian Awards	Best Actress (Pinakamahusay na Pangunahing Aktres)	Donor	Nominated
2011	8th ENPRESS Golden Screen Awards	Best Performance by an Actress in a Leading Role (Drama)	Donor	Nominated
2011	5th Gawad Genio Awards	International Excellence Awardee	Donor	Won
2011	3rd Ani ng Dangal	Award Recipient for Cinema	Donor	Won
2015	41st Metro Manila Film Festival	Best Actress	Honor Thy Father	Nominated
2016	34th FAP Luna Awards	Best Actress	Honor Thy Father	Nominated
2016	32nd PMPC Star Awards for Movies	Movie Actress of the Year	Honor Thy Father	Nominated
2016	18th Gawad PASADO Awards	Best Supporting Actress	Honor Thy Father	Won
2016	14th Gawad Tanglaw Awards	Best Supporting Actress	Honor Thy Father	Won
2017	35th FAP Luna Awards	Best Actress	Pauwi Na	Nominated
2017	40th Gawad Urian Awards	Best Supporting Actress (Pinakamahusay na Pangalawang Aktres)	Pauwi Na	Nominated
2017	33rd PMPC Star Awards for Movies	Movie Supporting Actress of the Year	Pauwi Na	Nominated
2019	17th Gawad Tanglaw Awards	Best Performance by an Actress (Single Performance)	Maalaala Mo Kaya: Duyan Episode	Won
