= Beauty and the Bestie =

- Theatrical release poster
- Directed by: Wenn V. Deramas
- Screenplay by: Mel Mendoza-Del Rosario
- Story by: Enrico C. Santos
- Produced by: Veronique Del Rosario-Corpus; Vincent G. Del Rosario
- Starring: Vice Ganda; Coco Martin
- Cinematography: Elmer Haresco Despa
- Edited by: Marya Ignacio
- Music by: Vincent de Jesus
- Production companies: ABS-CBN Film Productions, Inc.; Viva Films
- Distributed by: Star Cinema
- Release date: December 25, 2015
- Running time: 119 minutes
- Country: Philippines
- Language: Filipino
- Box office: ₱529 million (US$10.5 million)

Beauty and the Bestie is a 2015 Filipino action comedy film directed by Wenn V. Deramas, starring Vice Ganda and Coco Martin, alongside James Reid and Nadine Lustre. It is an official entry to the 2015 Metro Manila Film Festival.

It was produced by ABS-CBN Film Productions and Viva Films and was released nationwide under the banner of Star Cinema. It was also released overseas in cities that have a significant Filipino population. It is the seventh highest-grossing Filipino film of all time, as of 2023. This is Wenn V. Deramas' last film before his death on February 29, 2016, and last film as a co-production between Star Cinema and Viva Films in preparation for the partnership between TV5 Network and Viva before that deal got officially dissolved in late 2016 and both Star Cinema and Viva Films agreed to return with Finally Found Someone, Gandarrapiddo! The Revenger Squad and Ang Panday in 2017. The film's title is a play on the French fairy tale Beauty and the Beast.

== Plot ==
Erika is struggling to make money running a photography studio to support her family. The problem is exacerbated when her nephew is diagnosed with a rare condition that may lead to blindness. One day, her former best friend Emman suddenly shows up. Emman works for the Elite Super Secret Task Force, a spy agency tasked with the security of an upcoming beauty pageant. Erika happens to look exactly like Ms. Uzeklovakia, who was abducted by terrorists led by a Japanese Yakuza named Daemon Yu and their Korean right-hand man, Jin Jhong.

Emman asks Erika to pretend to be Ms. Uzeklovakia while the agency searches for the real deal. Erika is still resentful from the way she fell out with Emman and takes on the task in exchange for help caring for her family. Aside from all this, Erika's younger sister Abi and Emman's half-brother Tristan meet and end up falling in love. Erika must deal with their feelings for their former best friend while fending off terrorists and dealing with their worry about Abi's budding romance.

Before the Q&A portion of the coronation night, Erika encounters the real Ms. Uzeklovakia after she manages to escape from her kidnappers. She is disgusted by their scent until she is intercepted by Emman and their friends in order to secure her from the terrorists. With that Erika continues to pose as Ms. Uzeklovakia until she wins the pageant. They are soon interrupted by the terrorists who try to kill Erika and Daemon manages to kidnap them aboard a helicopter thinking they are Ms. Uzeklovakia. Emman eventually intercepts the helicopter. As Erika and Daemon fight, Emman manages to finally kill Daemon in time as Erika falls onto the ledge of the helicopter. Erika takes Emman's hand and finally reconciles until he drops Erika's hand and falls into the ocean which Emman follows.

Emman does CPR on Erika after rescuing her and soon reunites with her family. After the incident, the father of Ms. Uzeklovakia, the Uzeklovakian prime minister thanked Emman and Erika for saving his daughter.

The film ends where both Emman and Erika are eating fishballs from a vendor when both sense their shades were detonators, which explodes as they head to their next mission.

== Cast ==
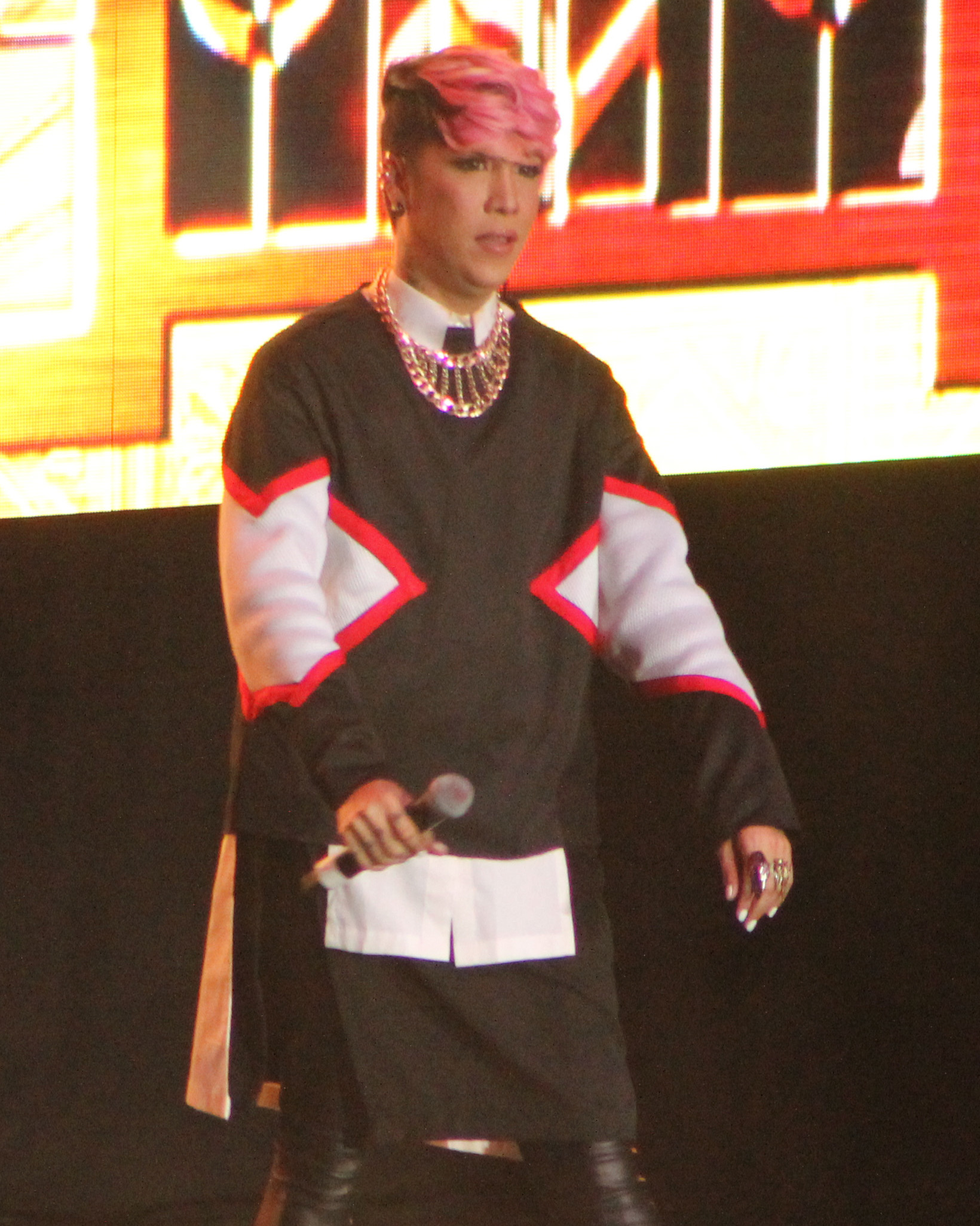
Vice Ganda portrays Eric "Erika" Albano Villavicencio and Natalia Thalia Nutreila.

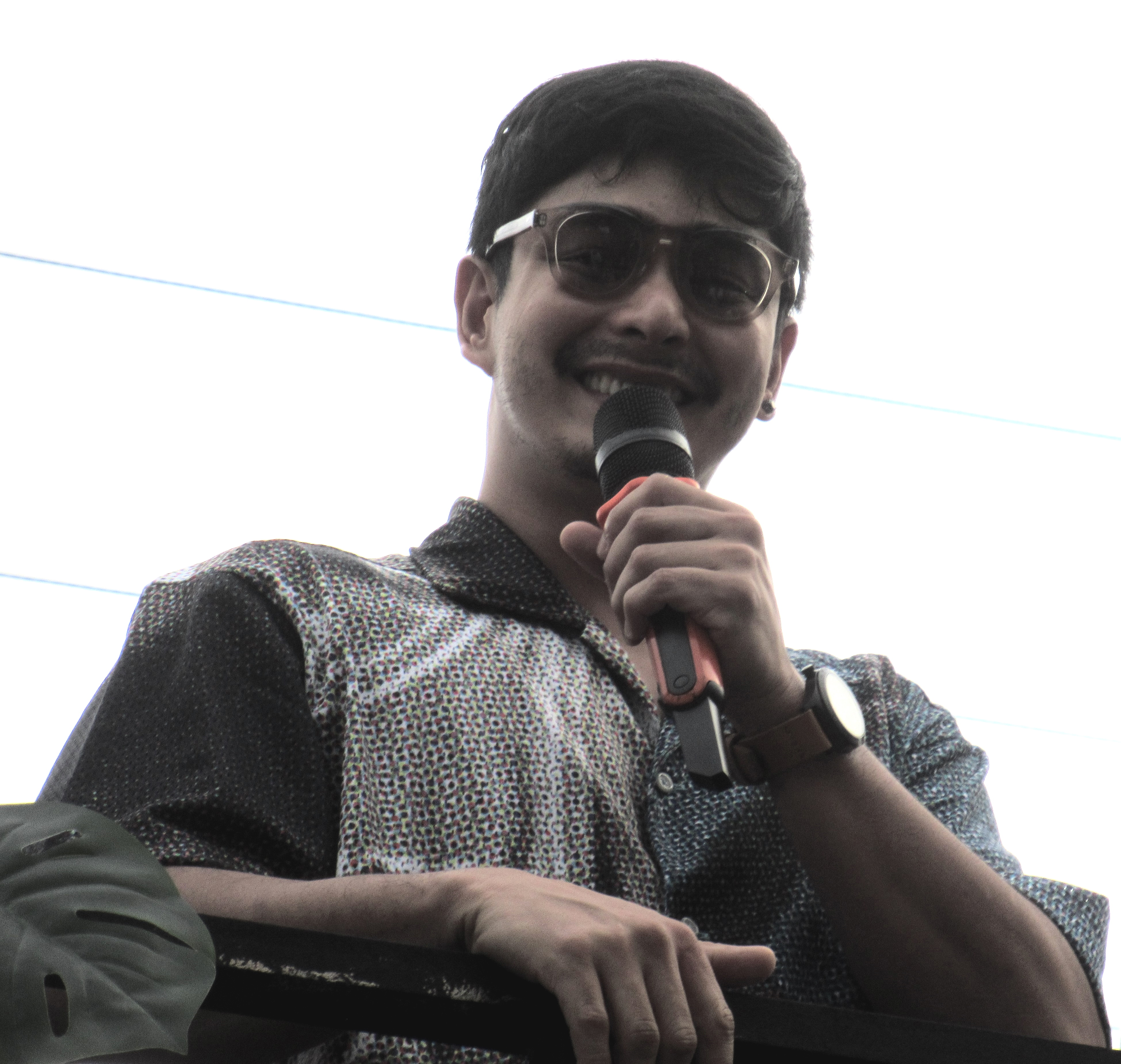
Coco Martin portrays Emman Castillo.

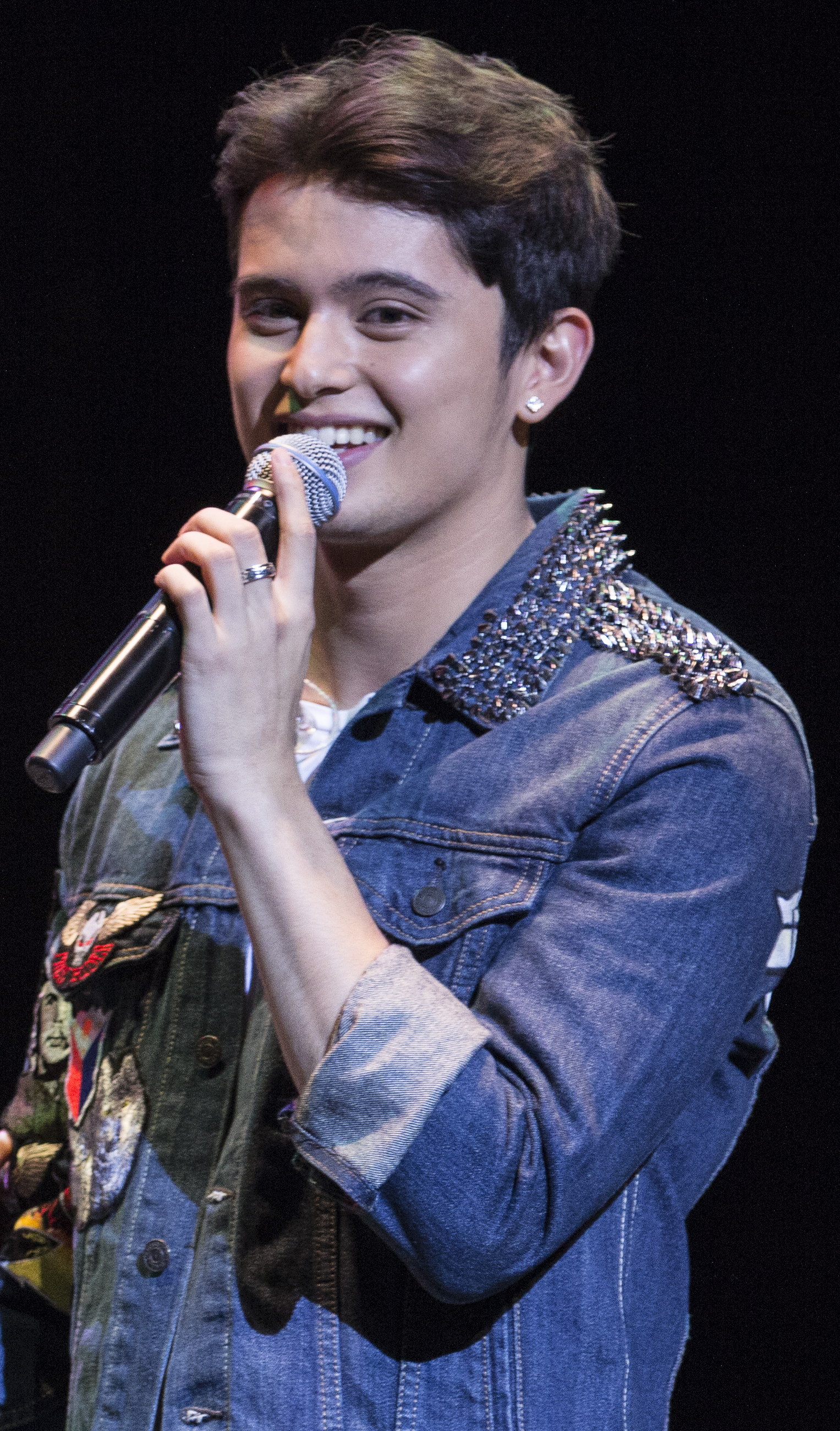
James Reid portrays Tristan Adams.

- Vice Ganda as Eric "Erika" Villavicencio / Natalia Thalia Nutreila
- Coco Martin as Emman Castillo
- James Reid as Tristan Adams
- Nadine Lustre as Abi Villavicencio
- Karla Estrada as Barbara "Ms. Barney" Clooney
- Badji Mortiz as George
- Ryan Bang as Jin Jhong
- Jacky Woo as Daemon Yu
- Alonzo Muhlach as Jumbo Villavicencio
- Marco Masa as Jimbo Villavicencio
- Lassy Marquez as Jude
- MC Calaquian as Stef
- Tetchie Agbayani as Coney Castillo
- Ron Morales as Rob
- Wilma Doesnt as Ms. Upanghet
- Jelson Bay as Chief Ben de Leon
- Tess Antonio as Riff
- Chrome Cosio as Jake
- Boom Labrusca as Joseph
- Menggie Cobarrubias as Eddie Castillo
- Valerie Concepcion as Editha "Edith" Villavicencio
- Jay-R as himself/host
- Karen Reyes as Nurse
- Raikko Mateo as Angelo
- Phoemela Baranda as herself/host
- Wendell Ramos as Jojo
- Miguel Faustmann as Prime Minister Thor Nutreila
- Bea Rose Santiago as Ms. Philippines
- Randy See as Dr. Kenneth Sy
- Divine Tetay as Interpreter / Kris Aquino impersonator
- Ahron Villena as the fishball vendor

== Release ==
The film was released nationwide on December 25, 2015, as an official entry to the 41st Metro Manila Film Festival. It was also released around the world on cities that have significant Filipino population except in the Middle East where the film was censored due to the region's predominantly Islamic religion.

=== Marketing ===
The teaser trailer of the film was released on YouTube on November 28, 2015, followed by its official trailer on December 4, 2015. This was followed by extensive TV spots on ABS-CBN network and its sister cable channels. It was also heavily promoted on the social media accounts of Star Cinema, VIVA, ABS-CBN and its subsidiaries including Vice Ganda's official Facebook account where he has over 12 million likes. A special dedicated page was also created by Star Cinema on its official website.

=== Music ===
The official theme song of the film is a cover of Jolina Magdangal's 90's hit "Chuva Choo Choo" which was relyricized and sung by Vice Ganda.

== Reception ==
=== Box office ===
The Metro Manila Film Festival committee did not disclose the official breakdown of the box office gross for each film, instead, they released the total box office gross of all the films in the festival and listed the top four films in no particular order. From the beginning to the end of the festival, Beauty and the Bestie was consistently included on the list of the top 4 grossing films, the other being My Bebe Love: #KiligPaMore, Haunted Mansion, and #WalangForever. GMA Films on the other hand reported that their film My Bebe Love was the highest-grossing film during the opening day with an earning of 60.4 million pesos. All other studios and distributors did not disclose their respective opening day gross. The Metro Manila Film Festival committee's reason for not disclosing the gross box office breakdown for each film was "to protect the other four film entries that did not make it on the top four." By January 7, 2016, the official closing of the festival, the film has grossed 428 million pesos making it the highest-grossing film in the 41st Metro Manila Film Festival. On January 25, 2016, the film has grossed 526 million pesos domestically, making it, at the time, the highest grossing Filipino film in domestic box office and the second highest grossing Filipino film of all time behind only A Second Chance.

=== Critical response ===
Beauty and the Bestie received mixed reviews from critics with many praising the humor, stunts, and other action sequences while criticizing the story and the acting.

Movies In the Philippines in a review have given the film a rating of 2.5 out of 5 stars stating, "The film's comedy works the same but thankfully, adding Coco Martin to its story makes it watchable as he's character drives the narrative in a convincing way." the critic added "The good thing about Beauty and the Bestie is that it doesn’t rely much on satirical comedy or other out-of-nowhere input to the story just to make things fun or make fun of things." Oggs Cruz of Rappler.com commented that, "Beauty and the Bestie is a whole lot of everything resulting to nothing", but he also added, "However, when the film becomes true to the fact that it is just a medley of punchlines, it sort of works. There are lengthy bits in the film that are truly funny. It surely helps that Vice Ganda is a very capable comedian who can use both his wit and his awkwardly masculine frame to deliver jokes that render parts of the film worthwhile." Philberty Dy of ClickTheCity rated the film 3.5 out of 5 stating, "It just gets sillier and sillier, and that's a good way to go." and "Beauty and the Bestie thrives on Absurdity"

== Controversies ==
=== Ticket swapping incident ===
On the opening day of the 2015 Metro Manila Film Festival, several moviegoers raised concerns on social media that the tickets they bought for another MMFF movie, My Bebe Love:#KiligPaMore were misprinted. Instead, their tickets had the title of Beauty and the Bestie. This was confirmed by Jose Javier Reyes on Twitter. In the official Twitter account of SM Cinema, it tweeted that there was indeed a mistake in the tickets but the tweets were removed. However, on December 26, 2015, the Metropolitan Manila Development Authority, the organizer of the festival, denied the accusations involving this incident. They added that the accusations were baseless and stated that fans should "be responsible in expressing their sentiments especially on social media." Wenn Deramas, director of Beauty and the Bestie, was skeptical about the ticket swapping incident and countered the claims of those moviegoers.

== Accolades ==
Award	Category	Recipient	Result
41st Metro Manila Film Festival	Best Child Performer	Alonzo Muhlach	Nominated
41st Metro Manila Film Festival	Best Child Performer	Marco Masa	Nominated
47th GMMSF Box-Office Entertainment Awards	Phenomenal Box-Office Star	Vice Ganda	Won
47th GMMSF Box-Office Entertainment Awards	Phenomenal Box-Office Star	Coco Martin	Won
47th GMMSF Box-Office Entertainment Awards	Most Popular Screenwriter	Wenn Deramas	Won
47th GMMSF Box-Office Entertainment Awards	Most Popular Film Director	Wenn Deramas	Won
