= My Bebe Love: KiligPaMore =

My Bebe Love: #KiligPaMore
- Film poster
- Directed by: Jose Javier Reyes
- Screenplay by: Jose Javier Reyes
- Story by: Bibeth Orteza; Jose Javier Reyes
- Produced by: Jose Mari Abacan; Annette Gozon-Abrogar; Orlando R. Ilacad; Marvic C. Sotto; Martina Eileen H. Delas Alas; Antonio P. Tuviera
- Starring: Vic Sotto; Ai-Ai delas Alas; Alden Richards; Maine Mendoza
- Cinematography: Patrick Layugan
- Edited by: Vanessa Ubas de Leon
- Music by: Vincent de Jesus
- Production companies: OctoArts Films; M-Zet Productions; APT Entertainment; GMA Pictures; MEDA Productions
- Distributed by: GMA Pictures; UMG Philippines (home media releases)
- Release date: December 25, 2015
- Country: Philippines
- Language: Filipino
- Budget: 80million
- Box office: ₱385 million

My Bebe Love: #KiligPaMore (transl. My Baby Love: #KeepOnFeelingKilig) is a 2015 Filipino romantic comedy film directed by Jose Javier Reyes, starring Ai-Ai delas Alas and Vic Sotto with Alden Richards and Maine Mendoza. It is an official entry to the 2015 Metro Manila Film Festival produced by Octo Arts Films, M-Zet Productions, APT Entertainment, GMA Pictures, and MEDA Productions. The film follows the love–hate relationship story between Vito Carillo (Sotto) and Corazon Talatala (delas Alas) and the growing relationship between star-crossed lovers Dondi Talatala (Richards) and Anna Carillo (Mendoza).

Aside from being the first film of the love team of Richards and Mendoza (collectively known as AlDub), My Bebe Love is the reunion film between delas Alas and Sotto after Enteng ng Ina Mo, which also was an MMFF entry in 2011. It is the first film co-produced under delas Alas's production company MEDA Productions. The film was shown internationally in selected cinemas in San Francisco and Los Angeles in the United States, Melbourne and Sydney in Australia, and Abu Dhabi and Dubai in the United Arab Emirates.

My Bebe Love formerly holds the record for the highest opening-day gross in Philippine cinema with ₱60.4 million until it was surpassed by The Super Parental Guardians with ₱75 million; it grossed ₱385 million nationwide. During the awards night of the MMFF, the film placed third for the Best Picture category, and received the Gatpuno Antonio J. Villegas Cultural Award; and Mendoza won Best Supporting Actress.

The film marks the last appearance of actress Lilia Cuntapay, who died in her son's home in Pinili, Ilocos Norte on August 20, 2016, aged 80.

== Plot ==
Dondi (Alden Richards) is a nerd and an obedient nephew to his aunt Cora (Ai-Ai delas Alas) who makes decisions for him. Meanwhile, Anna (Maine Mendoza) is a stubborn and rebellious girl who seeks the attention of her father Vito (Vic Sotto) who is a widower. Dondi and Anna cross paths and their different personalities collide. They eventually fall in love with each other and solve their own problems. Vito and Cora are bitter business competitors and because of their rivalry, they disapprove the romantic relationship between Dondi and Anna.

As their rivalry continues, Vito and Cora are caught up in a romance and this time, Dondi and Anna are the ones who disapprove of their relationship. Anna in particular strongly expresses her disagreement with the developing relationship between her father and Cora. She states that her departed mother was more beautiful than Cora. In the end, after they saw Vito and Cora being depressed because of their separation, Dondi and Anna set up a surprise party for their reunion and even inviting Aegis, close friends and business partners of Vito. After Vito and Cora were reunited and all seems well, Dondi and Anna almost kiss but was interrupted by a heart wipe transition leaving up to speculation to the audience if they were able to kiss at all. At the post-credit scene, Lola Nidora (a character in Kalyeserye) appears and urged the audience to wait for a "part two", presumably of the film.

== Cast ==
=== Main cast ===
- Vic Sotto as Vito Carillo

The owner of Carousel Inc., an events management company and the father of Anna Carillo.

- Ai-Ai delas Alas as Corazon "Cora" Talatala

The owner of Party People events management company and Dondi Talatala's noisy aunt.

- Alden Richards as Dondi

The nerd and obedient nephew of Corazon Talatala.

- Maine Mendoza as Anna

The stubborn and rebellious daughter of Vito Carillo.

=== Supporting cast ===
- Arlene Muhlach as Vivian

Her character is the best friend of Corazon Talatala.

- Valeen Montenegro as Cielo

Her character is the personal assistant of Vito Carillo.

- Ryan Yllana as Tootsie

His character is one of the staff of Party People.

- Sancho Vito delas Alas as Elmer

His character is one of the staff of Carousel Inc.

- Manny Castañeda as Vicente

His character is the customer of Party People.

- Lilia Cuntapay as Mrs. Sesmundo

Her character is a 100 year-old woman who celebrated her birthday at the event organized by Party People. She is also a relative of Manny Castañeda's character.

- Rollie Inocencio as the Resort Attendant

The weird waiter at the Zambales resort.

- Paulina Sotto as Sammie

Her character is one of the staff of Carousel Inc.

- Divine Aucina as Faudette - Anna's friend
- Diva Montelaba as Madette - Anna's friend
- Antonette Garcia as Yoleng - Cora's nanny
- Mickey Ferriols as Mimi - Cora's best friend

=== Special appearance ===
- Joey de Leon as Dom

The best friend of Vito Carillo who gives him advice about his love life.

- Jose Manalo as Domeng

The driver of Vito Carillo.

- Wally Bayola as Lola Nidora

Lola Nidora, a character from Kalyeserye, made a cameo appearance in the post-credits scene urging the audience to come back for a "part two."

- Paolo Ballesteros as Direk Reymond "Rich"

His character is the Floor Director of the event where Lilia Cuntapay's character celebrated her 100th birthday.

- Ryzza Mae Dizon

Her character is the kid at the restaurant who revealed to Vito where Dondi and Anna are hiding.

- Pauleen Luna

Her character is the usherette at the event in One Esplanade.

- Laurence Mossman

His character is the man at the restaurant who seen of Anna Carillo.

- Tintin Babao (uncredited), Ruby Rodriguez, Jimmy Santos, Tito Sotto and Anjo Yllana

Their characters are guests at the event in One Esplanade.

- Aegis as themselves

They performed at the event in One Esplanade.

== Production ==
In June 2015, the film was originally titled Rom-comin Mo Ako and Ai-Ai de las Alas and Vic Sotto were the only confirmed actors. In August 2015, Alden Richards signed a contract with APT Entertainment, one of the producers of the film, and was confirmed to be part of the film that was renamed to My Bebe Love. It was later revealed that the full title of the film is My Bebe Love: #KiligPaMore. The "bebe" in the title is a Filipino slang word meaning "baby" (term of endearment for a girlfriend or significant other) while #KiligPaMore is a hashtag that means having more of the kilig.

In an interview, Sotto said that they were still in negotiations to include Maine Mendoza, Alden Richards's love interest in Eat Bulaga!'s Kalyeserye television portion, in the film. Jose Javier Reyes, the director, said that the film exists on its own and the effect on the couple's television segment must be taken into consideration since Richards and Mendoza are not allowed to meet in person during those times. A few days later, after an Instagram post by Reyes and in an interview with delas Alas, it was confirmed that Mendoza would star and debut in the motion picture as Anna. Reyes who co-wrote the script of the film with Bibeth Orteza incorporated some of the story suggestions from the AlDub (Mendoza and Richards' love team name) fans. Reyes initiated a contest on Twitter where the winners were given free pass and to premiere night of the film.

Shooting started on September 19, 2015 and the AlDub couple began to shoot together fifteen days after the shooting. The last shooting day was November 30, 2015, at One Esplanade in Pasay. In an interview, Reyes pointed out that shooting My Bebe Love was quite a challenge due to expectations from the fans of Mendoza and Richards as well as making the senior actors Sotto and delas Alas refreshing.

== Release ==
My Bebe Love was released in the Philippines on December 25, 2015, as an official entry to the 2015 Metro Manila Film Festival. Before the film's release, television host and talent manager Lolit Solis and other entertainment writers predicted that it would be a blockbuster hit due to AlDub's popularity. A crowded red carpet premiere night of the film was held at SM Megamall Cinema 9 in Mandaluyong on December 21, 2015.

International screenings were confirmed by its director, Jose Javier Reyes. The film was shown in at least ten cities in the world including Los Angeles, San Francisco, Melbourne, Sydney, Abu Dhabi and Dubai. There are negotiations to release the film in Singapore. The confirmed screenings were at the United Arab Emirates, Australia and at the United States in January 2016.

=== Marketing ===
A 30-second teaser trailer for the film was aired on Eat Bulaga! Sa Tamang Panahon event held in Philippine Arena on October 24, 2015. The following week after the event, the couple together with Sotto, delas Alas, and the director of the film had their photo shoot for the film. A full trailer of the film that runs over three minutes was released online on November 20, 2015. On December 9, 2015, a press conference was held to promote the film.

Before the film was shown in theaters, the cast participated in the traditional Parade of Stars of the Metro Manila Film Festival where every film entries have their own floats. During the parade, the float of My Bebe Love became the most sought-after float after fans mobbed it.

=== Home media ===
In February 2016, My Bebe Love was made available in DVD discs by MCA Music (Universal Music Philippines).

== Reception ==
=== Critical response ===
My Bebe Love has been criticized for the addition of excessive and tasteless product placements in many scenes. ClicktheCity.com, an online entertainment site, gave the film one and a half stars out of five, stating that "the film strings together its stars’ endorsements and roughly molds them into the shape of a movie, narrative playing second fiddle to the impulse to promote brands." Film reviewer Oggs Cruz opined that "My Bebe Love is offensive because its ambitions are low." He added that the love story of Vito and Corazon fares better than Dondi and Anna. He suggested that the film should have at least "stretch the psychology that resulted in the celebrated love team of Maine Mendoza and Alden Richards."

Philippine Entertainment Portal (PEP) in a positive review praised the chemistry between Mendoza and Richards stating that "Alden and Maine, on the other hand, act like the more mature pair. They temper those kilig moments with more getting-to-know-you scenes that can put their elders’ wham-bham way of dating to shame." PEP further highlighted improvements in Mendoza's acting as "she acquits herself well for a newbie in the movies. Maine's eyes reflect a whole range of emotions: joy, disappointment, shock, irritation, etc."

=== Box office ===
According to Director Jose Javier Reyes, My Bebe Love has hit the Php 1 million mark in its first hour of showing. It broke opening day box office records of the Metro Manila Film Festival (MMFF) as it posted gross earnings of ₱60 million on its opening day beating the record of ₱53 million by The Amazing Praybeyt Benjamin and making it the highest opening gross for a local film until it was surpassed by The Super Parental Guardians. It grossed over ₱33 million and over ₱27 million from cinemas in Metro Manila and provinces respectively. On December 26, it posted gross earnings of ₱121.6 million. According to Metropolitan Manila Development Authority (MMDA) Chairman Emerson Carlos, My Bebe Love led the first three days of the festival and it posted the gross earnings of ₱159 million. After five days, the total gross is equal to ₱214 million. The film went on to gross ₱385 million.

==== Ticket swapping incident ====
On the opening day of the 2015 Metro Manila Film Festival, several moviegoers raised concerns on social media that the tickets they bought for My Bebe Love were misprinted. Instead, their tickets had the title of another MMFF movie, Beauty and the Bestie. This was confirmed by Jose Javier Reyes on Twitter. In the official Twitter account of SM Cinema, it tweeted that there was indeed a mistake in the tickets but the tweets were removed. However, on December 26, 2015, Metropolitan Manila Development Authority, organizer of the festival, denied the accusations involving this incident. They added that the accusations were baseless and stated that fans should "be responsible in expressing their sentiments especially on social media." Wenn Deramas, director of Beauty and the Bestie, was skeptical about the ticket swapping incident and countered the claims of those moviegoers. Along with other alleged irregularities of the 2015 Metro Manila Film Festival, the committee on Metro Manila development of the House of Representatives called a meeting to investigate the ticket swapping issue. Although during the inquiry, there were no representatives present from both of the producers of My Bebe Love and Beauty and the Bestie.

=== Accolades ===
My Bebe Love won three categories and nominated in five categories in the 2015 Metro Manila Film Festival awards night on December 27, 2015, at the Kia Theater, Cubao, Quezon City. The film got the 3rd Best Picture award and the Gatpuno Antonio J. Villegas Cultural Award. The Best Supporting Actress award went to Maine Mendoza who personally questioned her achievement by saying "Why me?" This is Mendoza's first film acting award and she attained it only after nearly six months in show business.

Sotto and delas Alas won the Box Office King and Queen awards, respectively, for being the lead stars of My Bebe Love. The awards were given by the Guillermo Mendoza Memorial Scholarship Foundation and cited the film's record-breaking opening day gross. Winners received their awards on April 17, 2016.

Award	Category	Recipient(s) and nominee(s)	Result
41st Metro Manila Film Festival Awards
41st Metro Manila Film Festival Awards	3rd Best Picture	My Bebe Love #KiligPaMore	Won
41st Metro Manila Film Festival Awards	Best Actress	Ai-Ai Delas Alas	Nominated
41st Metro Manila Film Festival Awards	Best Director	Jose Javier Reyes	Nominated
41st Metro Manila Film Festival Awards	Best Supporting Actor	Alden Richards	Nominated
41st Metro Manila Film Festival Awards	Best Supporting Actress	Maine Mendoza	Won
41st Metro Manila Film Festival Awards	Best Screenplay	Jose Javier Reyes	Nominated
41st Metro Manila Film Festival Awards	Best Original Story	Bibeth Orteza	Nominated
41st Metro Manila Film Festival Awards	Gatpuno Antonio J. Villegas Cultural Award	My Bebe Love #KiligPaMore	Won
47th GMMSF Box-Office Entertainment Awards
47th GMMSF Box-Office Entertainment Awards	Box Office King	Vic Sotto	Won
47th GMMSF Box-Office Entertainment Awards	Box Office Queen	Ai-Ai Delas Alas	Won
47th GMMSF Box-Office Entertainment Awards	Highest Opening Day Gross of All Time	My Bebe Love #KiligPaMore	Won
