= 2000 Metro Manila Film Festival =

Film festival edition

- Date: December 25, 2000 to January 3, 2001
- Site: Manila

Highlights
- Best Picture: Tanging Yaman
- Most awards: Tanging Yaman (9)

Television coverage
- Network: RPN

The 26th Metro Manila Film Festival was held in Manila, Philippines starting December 25.

Gloria Romero, received the Best Actress plum during the 2000 Metro Manila Film Festival for her role in Star Cinema's Tanging Yaman. It was a popular victory acknowledged with a standing ovation for a revered actress. The movie also received eight more major awards including the Best Picture, the Gatpuno Antonio J. Villegas Cultural Awards, Best Actor for Johnny Delgado and Metro Manila Film Festival Award for Best Director and Best Original Story for two-time winner Laurice Guillen among others. On the other hand, GMA Films' Deathrow took home four awards including the Second Best Picture.

== Entries ==
Title	Starring	Studio	Director	Genre
Deathrow	Eddie Garcia, Cogie Domingo, Angelika dela Cruz, Jaclyn Jose, Allan Paule, Pen Medina, Ray Ventura, Ace Espinosa	GMA Films	Joel Lamangan	Action, Crime, Drama
Markova: Comfort Gay	Dolphy, Eric Quizon, Loren Legarda, Jeffrey Quizon	RVQ Productions	Gil Portes	Biography, Drama, History
Ping Lacson: Super Cop	Rudy Fernandez, Lorna Tolentino, Ricky Davao, Glydel Mercado, Ace Espinosa, Trubador Ramos, Levi Ignacio, Herbert Bautista	Millennium Cinema	Toto Natividad	Action, Biography
Spirit Warriors	Joel Torre, Jhong Hilario, Spencer Reyes, Vhong Navarro, Danilo Barrios, Chris Cruz, Meynard Marcellano, Sherwin Roux, Nikko Manalo, Michael Foz-Sesmundo, Denise Joaquin	MAQ Productions and Roadrunner Network, Inc.	Chito Rono	Action, Fantasy, Horror
Sugatang Puso	Christopher de Leon, Lorna Tolentino, Cherie Gil, Patrick Garcia, Carlo Aquino	Regal Films	Jose Javier Reyes	Drama
Tanging Yaman	Hilda Koronel, Edu Manzano, Dina Bonnevie, Johnny Delgado, Joel Torre, Cherry Pie Picache, Marvin Agustin, Jericho Rosales, Ms. Gloria Romero, Janette McBride, John Prats, Carol Banawa, CJ Ramos, Dominic Ochoa, Shaina Magdayao	Star Cinema	Laurice Guillen	Drama, Family

== Winners and nominees ==
=== Awards ===
Winners are listed first and highlighted in boldface.

Best Film	Best Director
**Tanging Yaman - Star Cinema**; Deathrow - GMA Films (2nd Best Picture); Sugatang Puso - Regal Films (3rd Best Picture); Spirit Warriors - MAQ Productions; Markova: Comfort Gay - RVQ Productions; Ping Lacson: Supercop - Millennium Cinema	Laurice Guillen - Tanging Yaman
Best Actor	Best Actress
**Johnny Delgado – Tanging Yaman**	Gloria Romero – Tanging Yaman
Best Supporting Actor	Best Supporting Actress
**Jeffrey Quizon – Markova: Comfort Gay**	Cherie Gil – Sugatang Puso
Best Cinematography	Best Production Design
**Videlle Meily - Tanging Yaman**	Joey Luna - Deathrow
Best Child Performer	Best Editing
	Jess Navarro and Kelly Cruz - Deathrow
Best Original Story	Best Screenplay
**Laurice Guillen - Tanging Yaman**	Shaira Mella Salvador, Raymond Lee and Laurice Guillen - Tanging Yaman
Best Original Theme Song	Best Musical Score
-	Nonong Buencamino - Tanging Yaman
Best Visual Effects	Best Make-up Artist
**Roadrunner Network, Inc. - Spirit Warriors**	Cecile Baun, Benny Batoctoy and Warren Munar - Spirit Warriors
Best Sound Recording	Best Float
**Albert Michael Idioma and Rudy Gonzales - Deathrow**	Spirit Warriors - MAQ Productions and Roadrunner Network, Inc.
Gatpuno Antonio J. Villegas Cultural Awards
**Tanging Yaman - Star Cinema**

== Multiple awards ==
Awards	Film
9	Tanging Yaman
4	Deathrow
3	Spirit Warriors
2	Sugatang Puso

Preceded by 1999 Metro Manila Film Festival	Metro Manila Film Festival; 2000	Succeeded by 2001 Metro Manila Film Festival
