= Magic Kingdom: Ang Alamat ng Damortis =

Philippine fantasy adventure film

- Official movie poster
- Directed by: Peque Gallaga; Lore Reyes
- Screenplay by: Paul Daza; Peque Gallaga; Lore Reyes
- Story by: Gabriel Fernandez; Bradley Mayer; Erik Matti
- Produced by: Vincent del Rosario III; Veronique del Rosario-Corpus
- Starring: Jason Salcedo; Janus del Prado; Junell Hernando; Jun Urbano
- Cinematography: Richard Padernal
- Edited by: Danny Gloria
- Music by: Archie Castillo
- Production company: Neo Films
- Distributed by: Neo Films
- Release date: December 25, 1997
- Running time: 112 minutes
- Country: Philippines
- Language: Filipino
- Budget: ₱33 million

Magic Kingdom: Ang Alamat ng Damortis is a 1997 Philippine fantasy adventure film directed by Peque Gallaga and Lore Reyes. The film stars Jason Salcedo, Janus del Prado, Junell Hernando and Jun Urbano. It was one of the entries in the 1997 Metro Manila Film Festival, where it won as 3rd Best Picture. It marks the theatrical debut of Anne Curtis.

It is a sequel to the 1996 film Magic Temple.

== Plot ==
In the kingdom of Damortis, Empress Sofia was killed by her brother Basilicus when he ordered a Mandog, a monster, to kill her. But Sofia's only daughter and heir, Princess Dahlia, was brought by Gaman along with Mico to the world of mortals. This led to Basilicus ruling over Damortis. Amain, a mystic teacher, learned about what happened when he went to Gaman in their hideout in Tondo, Manila. As Basilicus's men came, they captured Gaman, and Amain took Dahlia and Jomar, his apprentice. Amain then told Jobert, Oman, and Samuel, his students, to treat her fairly. But the boys would treat her just a servant. Gaman was brought to Basilicus and asked where Dahlia was. Basilicus put a worm in his ear. Before he died, Gaman told Basilicus that they were in Talisay. Rava, Basilicus's right hand, and his men went to Talisay. As the boys are away on a serenade, Amain was captured by Rava and burned his house. Dahlia was unable to save Amain. This led the teens to go to Damortis. But a worm went to Oman's ear without anyone knowing. Jobert, Oman, Samuel, Mico, and Dahlia saw Gabriel, a miner who told them where they could ask for food. When they went to a house for food, the people recognized Princess Dahlia as the Pearl of Damortis. She then learned about the death of her mother, Empress Sofia. Jobert, Oman, and Mico were captured by Rava and his men and brought to the palace. They found out that Gabriel informed them about it for the bounty. But they couldn't find Dahlia and Samuel. At the palace dungeon, they saw Amain and were able to escape. They then confronted Basilicus and Rava, and a fight ensued. Dahlia then asked Basilicus to surrender. This caused a war as Gabriel came, bringing some men, and fought the men of Basilicus. Samuel went to the Mandogs' cell and asked for their cooperation. Samuel, bringing the Mandogs with him, fought Rava and his men. Basilicus tries to escape through a hidden trapdoor on the throne, but is followed by Dahlia and Samuel. When Basilicus saw Dahlia, he was about to kill her using a crossbow, but Samuel came between the arrow and her, saving Dahlia from death. Gabriel wiped out the soldiers of Basilicus. Basilicus flees back to the throne room and surrenders the crown to Dahlia. But Dahlia stepped on the train of the coat, and Basilicus fell on the crown, impaling him, and he was attacked by the Mandogs. Gabriel then puts the crown on Dahlia, making her the new ruler of Damortis. Dahlia then offers Gabriel the position of general of her troops. After six months, the entire kingdom celebrated Dahlia's ascension to the throne. Gabriel gave Amain an umbrella for him to remember Damortis, and he, along with Jobert, Oman, and Samuel, left for Talisay. As Jobert, Oman, and Samuel are racing home, Amain opens the umbrella and has a glimpse of Damortis. At the end, Amain gives Samuel his "tuldok" as a sign of his passage to becoming an adult.

== Cast ==
- Jason Salcedo as Jobert
- Janus del Prado as Oman
- Junell Hernando as Samuel
- Jun Urbano as Amain
- Mark Gil as Basilicus
- William Martinez as Gabriel
- Ramon Christopher as Rava
- Turko Cervantes as Gaman
- Maricel Laxa as Empress Sofia
- Anne Curtis as Dahlia
- Jomari Uy as Mico
- Mark Querubin as Woodcutter
- Lilia Cuntapay as Wormkeeper
- Mark Bacho as Nervous Creature

== Production ==
Kung Nandyan Ka Lang, sung by Antoinette Taus, was the theme song for the film.

== Awards ==
Year	Awards	Category	Recipient	Result	Ref.
1997	23rd Metro Manila Film Festival	Best Film	Magic Kingdom	3rd	
1997	23rd Metro Manila Film Festival	Best Production Design	Bradley Mayer	Won	
1997	23rd Metro Manila Film Festival	Best Cinematography	Richard Padernal	Won	
1997	23rd Metro Manila Film Festival	Best Visual Effects	Roadrunner Network	Won	
1997	23rd Metro Manila Film Festival	Best Make-up	Manuel Benito	Won	
1997	23rd Metro Manila Film Festival	Best Float	Magic Kingdom	Won	
1998	46th FAMAS Awards	Best Special Effects	Roadrunner Network	Won	
1998	46th FAMAS Awards	Best Visual Effects	Roadrunner Network	Won	
