= 1998 Metro Manila Film Festival =

Film festival edition

- Date: December 25, 1998 to January 3, 1999
- Site: Manila

Highlights
- Best Picture: José Rizal
- Most awards: José Rizal (17)

Television coverage
- Network: ABS-CBN

The 24th Metro Manila Film Festival was held in 1998.

It was a clean sweep for José Rizal in the 1998 Metro Manila Film Festival. The movie won all but one of the eighteen awards at stake, which is the Best Actress given to Alice Dixson for her portrayal in Sambahin ang Ngalan Mo.

== Entries ==
Title	Starring	Studio	Director	Genre
Babae sa Bintana	Richard Gomez, Rosanna Roces, John Estrada, Johnny Manahan, Efren Reyes, Jr., Raymond Keannu	Regal Films	Chito Roño	Action, Drama, Thriller
Hiwaga ng Panday	Jinggoy Estrada, Kris Aquino, Robert Arevalo, Gloria Sevilla, Bernadette Allyson, Nards Belen, Benedict Aquino, Martin Gutierrez, Caloy Salvador, Bernard Fabiosa, Celso Ad. Castillo	Golden Lions Films	Carlo J. Caparas	Action, Fantasy
José Rizal	Cesar Montano, Gloria Diaz, Joel Torre, Jaime Fabregas, Gardo Versoza, Gina Alajar, Tanya Gomez, Ronnie Lazaro, Subas Herrero, Pen Medina, Chinchin Gutierrez, Monique Wilson, Jhong Hilario, Mickey Ferriols	GMA Films	Marilou Diaz-Abaya	Biography, Drama, History
Kasal-kasalan Sakalan	Judy Ann Santos, Wowie de Guzman, Gladys Reyes, Christopher Roxas, Elizabeth Oropesa, Ai-Ai delas Alas, Tiya Pusit, Berting Labra	Solar Films	Edgardo "Boy" Vinarao	Drama, Romance
Puso ng Pasko	Jolina Magdangal, Jaclyn Jose, Rita Avila, Cherry Pie Picache, Edu Manzano, Jason Salcedo, Anna Larrucea, Emman Abeleda, Justin Simoy, Korinne Lirio	Star Cinema	Peque Gallaga and Lore Reyes	Comedy, Fantasy
Sambahin ang Ngalan Mo	Eddie Garcia, Christopher de Leon, Jomari Yllana, Alice Dixson	MAQ Productions and EG Productions	José Carreon	Action, Drama

== Winners and nominees ==
=== Awards ===
Winners are listed first and highlighted in boldface.

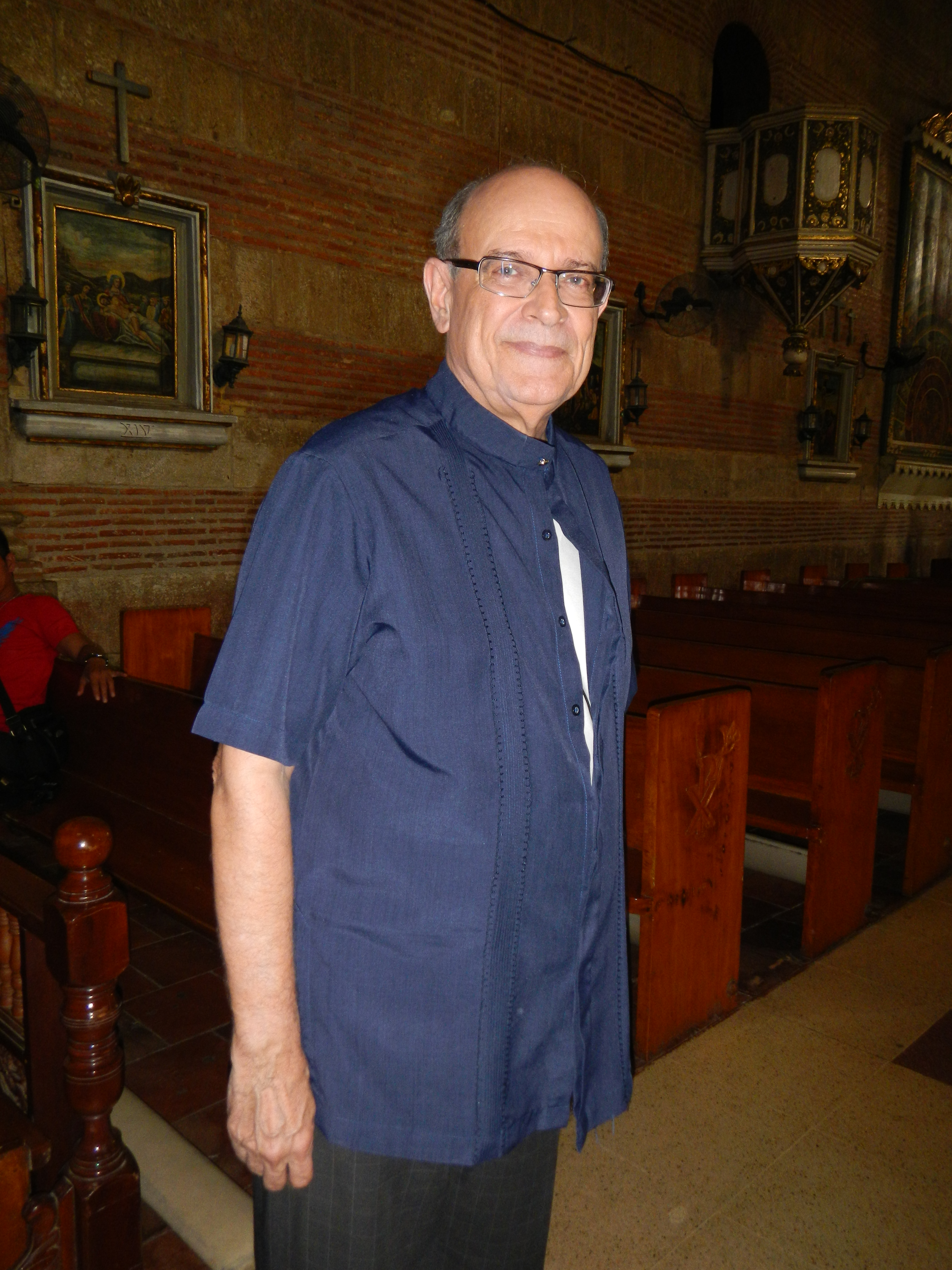
Jaime Fabregas, Best Supporting Actor winner

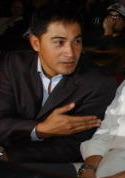
Cesar Montano, Best Actor winner

Best Film	Best Director
**José Rizal - GMA Films**; Babae sa Bintana - Regal Films (2nd Best Picture); Puso ng Pasko - Star Cinema (3rd Best Picture)	Marilou Diaz-Abaya - José Rizal
Best Actor	Best Actress
**Cesar Montano – José Rizal**	Alice Dixson – Sambahin ang Ngalan Mo
Best Supporting Actor	Best Supporting Actress
**Jaime Fabregas – José Rizal**	Gloria Diaz – José Rizal
Best Production Design	Best Cinematography
**Leo Abaya - José Rizal**	Rody Lacap - José Rizal
Best Child Performer	Best Editing
-	Jess Navarro and Manet Dayrit - José Rizal
Best Original Story	Best Screenplay
**Ricky Lee, Jun Lana and Peter Lim - José Rizal**	Ricky Lee, Jun Lana and Peter Lim - José Rizal
Best Original Theme Song	Best Musical Score
**Nonong Buencamino ("Awit ni Maria Clara") - José Rizal**	Nonong Buencamino - José Rizal
Best Visual Effects	Best Make-up Artist
**Optima Digital - José Rizal**	Dennis Tan - José Rizal
Best Sound Recording	Best Float
**Mike Idioma - José Rizal**	José Rizal - GMA Films
Gatpuno Antonio J. Villegas Cultural Awards
**José Rizal - GMA Films**

== Multiple awards ==
Awards	Film
17	José Rizal

Preceded by 1997 Metro Manila Film Festival	Metro Manila Film Festival; 1998	Succeeded by 1999 Metro Manila Film Festival
