= 1996 Metro Manila Film Festival =

Film festival edition

- Date: December 25, 1996 to January 3, 1997
- Site: Manila

Highlights
- Best Picture: Magic Temple
- Most awards: Magic Temple (14)

The 22nd Metro Manila Film Festival was held in 1996.

Amy Austria and Jomari Yllana won top honors in the 1996 Metro Manila Film Festival for winning the Best Actress and Best Actor Award respectively. Star Cinema's Magic Temple walked away most of the awards, fourteen in total including the Best Picture, and Best Director, Best Story and Best Screenplay for Peque Gallaga and Lore Reyes. The film also receives the Best Float and the Gatpuno Antonio J. Villegas Cultural Awards.

== Entries ==
Title	Starring	Studio	Director	Genre
Aring King King: Ang Bodyguard Kong Sexy	Dolphy, Vandolph, Anjanette Abayari, Tirso Cruz III, Babalu, Jean Garcia, Dick Israel	Premiere Entertainment Productions	Jett Espiritu	Comedy
Emong Salvacion: Humanda Ka...Oras Mo Na!	Eddie Garcia, Gardo Versoza, Raymond Keannu, Beth Tamayo, Giorgia Ortega, Ara Mina, Dennis Roldan	Regal Films	Francis 'Jun' Posadas	Action
Kahit Kailan: Love Forgives	Richard Gomez, Aiko Melendez, Jomari Yllana, Giselle Toengi, Roberto Aviles, Melissa Mendez, Johnny Vicar	MAQ Productions	Maryo J. de los Reyes	Drama
Magic Temple	Jason Salcedo, Junell Hernando, Marc Solis, Jun Urbano, Anna Larrucea, Gina Pareno, Aljon Jimenez, Jackie Lou Blanco	Star Cinema	Lore Reyes and Peque Gallaga	Action, Adventure, Fantasy
Rubberman: Up, Up and Away!	Michael V., Beth Tamayo, Gloria Romero, Dick Israel, Roy Alvarez, Allan K.	Octoarts Films and Cinemax Studios	Edgardo 'Boy' Vinarao	Comedy, Action, Superhero
Trudis Liit	Julio Diaz, Amy Austria, Jean Garcia, Jackie Aquino, Paquito Diaz, Suzette Ranillo, Dick Israel, Agatha Tapan & Marijoy Adorable	RJ Films	Jett Espiritu	Drama

== Winners and nominees ==
=== Awards ===
Winners are listed first and highlighted in boldface.

Best Film	Best Director
**Magic Temple - Star Cinema**; Emong Salvacion: Humanda Ka...Oras Mo Na! - Regal Films (2nd Best Picture); Trudis Liit - RJ Films (3rd Best Picture)	Peque Gallaga and Lore Reyes - Magic Temple
Best Actor	Best Actress
**Jomari Yllana – Kahit Kailan: Love Forgives**	Amy Austria – Trudis Liit
Best Supporting Actor	Best Supporting Actress
**John Arcilla – Mulanay**	Jean Garcia – Trudis Liit
Best Production Design	Best Cinematography
**Rodell Cruz - Magic Temple**	Joe Tutanes - Magic Temple
Best Child Performer	Best Editing
**Agatha Tapan - Trudis Liit**	Danilo Gloria - Magic Temple
Best Original Story	Best Screenplay
**Peque Gallaga, Lore Reyes and Erik Matti - Magic Temple**	Peque Gallaga and Lore Reyes and Erik Matti - Magic Temple
Best Original Theme Song	Best Musical Score
**Archie Castillo - Magic Temple**	Archie Castillo - Magic Temple
Best Visual Effects	Best Make-up Artist
**Benny Batoctoy - Magic Temple**	Siony Tolentino - Magic Temple
Best Sound Recording	Best Float
**Michael Idioma and Ronald de Asis - Magic Temple**	Magic Temple - Star Cinema
Gatpuno Antonio J. Villegas Cultural Awards
**Magic Temple - Star Cinema**

=== Special awards ===
**Plaque of Recognition for Winning in the Cairo Film Festival**	Nora Aunor
**Star of the Night**	Melanie Marquez

== Multiple awards ==
Awards	Film
14	Magic Temple
4	Trudis Liit
1	Emong Salvacion: Humanda Ka...Oras Mo Na!

Preceded by 1995 Metro Manila Film Festival	Metro Manila Film Festival; 1996	Succeeded by 1997 Metro Manila Film Festival
