= Spirit Warriors =

Spirit Warriors may refer to:

- Spirit Warriors (TV series), a BBC children's adventure series
- Spirit Warriors (film), a 2000 Filipino fantasy-horror film
