= Muro-Ami =

Muro-Ami may refer to:

- Muro-ami, a fishing technique
- Muro-Ami (film), a 1999 Filipino film
