= Andrea, Paano Ba ang Maging Isang Ina? =

- Official poster
- Directed by: Gil M. Portes
- Screenplay by: Ricardo Lee
- Story by: Gil M. Portes
- Produced by: Mely Nicandro
- Starring: Nora Aunor; Gina Alajar
- Cinematography: Ely Cruz
- Edited by: Edgardo Vinarao
- Music by: Mon Faustino
- Production company: MRN Films
- Release date: December 25, 1990
- Running time: 155 minutes
- Country: Philippines
- Language: Filipino

Andrea, Paano Ba ang Maging Isang Ina? (English: Andrea, How Is It Like to Be a Mother?) is a 1990 Filipino film directed by Gil M. Portes and co-written by Ricky Lee. The film stars Nora Aunor in the title role.

An official entry to the 16th Metro Manila Film Festival, the film was theatrically released on December 25, 1990.

The film won for Aunor all the Best Actress Awards given by the five annual award-giving bodies in the Philippines at that time. The film was also awarded Best Picture by the Filipino Academy of Movie Arts and Sciences, the Young Critics Circle, and the PMPC Star Awards for Movies.

== Plot ==
Andrea, whose is now about to give birth, decided to go to Manila to escape being chased by the military, along with her husband Momoy. In Manila, she lived with her friend Joyce.

== Cast ==
- Nora Aunor as Andrea
- Gina Alajar as Joyce
- Lloyd Samartino as Emil
- Dan Alvaro as Donato
- Perla Bautista as Mrs. Abad
- Juan Rodrigo as Momoy
- RR Herrera as Gabriel/Raymond
- Melissa Mendez as Emma
- Susan Africa as Jacklyn
- Ernie Zarate as Tomas
- Malou de Guzman as activist teacher
- Lani Lizarda as activist teacher
- Grace Amilbangsa as missionary 1
- Joyce Bernal as missionary 2
- Al-Rasheed as Nato
- Bunny del Rosario as midwife
- Joel David as human rights lawyer
- Raul Regalado as interrogator 1
- Eros Lapena as interrogator 2
- Crisaldo Pablo as Rebel
- Edel Acenas as Pol
- Precy Tabuena as Lucia
- Ernesto Arguelles as Pedro

== Awards ==
Year	Group	Category	Nominee	Result
1990	Metro Manila Film Festival	Best Picture	Andrea, Paano Ba ang Maging Isang Ina?	Won
1990	Metro Manila Film Festival	Best Director	Gil Portes	Won
1990	Metro Manila Film Festival	Best Actress	Nora Aunor	Won
1990	Metro Manila Film Festival	Best Supporting Actress	Gina Alajar	Won
1990	Metro Manila Film Festival	Best Editing	Boy Vinario	Won
1990	Metro Manila Film Festival	Best Story	Ricky Lee and Gil Portes	Won
1990	Metro Manila Film Festival	Best Screenplay	Ricky Lee and Gil Portes	Won
1990	Metro Manila Film Festival	Best Original Song	Mon Faustino	Won
1990	Metro Manila Film Festival	Best Music	Mon Faustino	Won
1990	Metro Manila Film Festival	Best Studio Sound Recording	Rolly Ruta	Won
1990	Metro Manila Film Festival	Gatpuno Antonio J. Villegas Cultural Awards	Andrea, Paano Ba ang Maging Isang Ina?	Won
1991	Filipino Academy of Movie Arts and Sciences Awards	Best Picture	Andrea, Paano Ba ang Maging Isang Ina?	Won
1991	Filipino Academy of Movie Arts and Sciences Awards	Best Actress	Nora Aunor	Won
1991	Filipino Academy of Movie Arts and Sciences Awards	Best Editing	Edgardo Vinarao	Won
1991	Filipino Academy of Movie Arts and Sciences Awards	Best Screenplay	Ricky Lee	Won
1991	Filipino Academy of Movie Arts and Sciences Awards	Best Story	Ricky Lee	Won
1991	Filipino Academy of Movie Arts and Sciences Awards	Best Director	Gil Portes	Nominated
1991	Gawad Urian Awards (Manunuri ng Pelikulang Pilipino)	Best Actress	Nora Aunor	Won
1991	Gawad Urian Awards (Manunuri ng Pelikulang Pilipino)	Best Picture	Edgardo Vinarao	Nominated
1991	Gawad Urian Awards (Manunuri ng Pelikulang Pilipino)	Best Supporting Actress	Gina Alajar	Nominated
1991	Gawad Urian Awards (Manunuri ng Pelikulang Pilipino)	Best Music	Mon Faustino	Nominated
1991	Gawad Urian Awards (Manunuri ng Pelikulang Pilipino)	Best Screenplay	Ricky Lee	Nominated
1991	Film Academy of the Philippines (Luna Awards)	Best Actress	Nora Aunor	Won
1991	Film Academy of the Philippines (Luna Awards)	Best Supporting Actress	Gina Alajar	Won
1991	Film Academy of the Philippines (Luna Awards)	Best Editing	Edgardo Vinarao	Won
1991	Film Academy of the Philippines (Luna Awards)	Best Screenplay	Ricky Lee	Won
1991	PMPC Star Awards for Movies (Philippine Movie Press Club)	Best Actress	Nora Aunor	Won
1991	PMPC Star Awards for Movies (Philippine Movie Press Club)	Movie of the Year	Andrea, Paano Ba ang Maging Isang Ina?	Won
1991	Young Critics Circle	Best Performance by Male or Female, Adult or Child, Individual or Ensemble in Leading or Supporting Role	Nora Aunor	Won
1991	Young Critics Circle	Best Picture	Andrea, Paano Ba ang Maging Isang Ina?	Won
1991	Young Critics Circle	Best Screenplay	Ricky Lee	Won
