= Batang PX =

1997 drama film by Jose Javier Reyes

- Re-release poster, released in 2016 at the UP Film Institute
- Directed by: Jose Javier Reyes
- Written by: Jose Javier Reyes
- Produced by: Charo Santos-Concio; Malou N. Santos
- Starring: Patrick Garcia; Zsa Zsa Padilla; Edu Manzano; Nida Blanca; Anna Larrucea; Piolo Pascual
- Cinematography: Ding Achacoso
- Edited by: Danny Gloria
- Music by: Nonong Buencamino
- Production companies: Star Cinema; Available Light Productions
- Distributed by: Star Cinema (Note: Credited as Star Cinema Productions in the opening titles.)
- Release date: May 7, 1997
- Running time: 113 minutes
- Country: Philippines
- Language: Filipino

Batang PX (English: Fil-American Kid) is a 1997 Filipino drama film written and directed by Jose Javier Reyes. The film stars Patrick Garcia and Zsa Zsa Padilla, and it tackles domestic violence and the Filipino-American children whose American fathers abandoned them after the withdrawal of the American forces from the country in November 1992. It also stars Edu Manzano, Nida Blanca, Anna Larrucea, Piolo Pascual (in his cinematic debut), and Cherry Pie Picache.

A co-production between Star Cinema and Available Light Productions, the film was theatrically released on May 7, 1997, and it earned several awards and nominations from different award-giving bodies and was also responsible for bringing Patrick Garcia to stardom. In 2017, the film was digitally restored and remastered by the joint effort and cooperation of ABS-CBN Film Restoration and Central Digital Lab.

== Synopsis ==
The Philippines is considered the home of one of the biggest U.S. military bases in the world. It is not surprising that the population of Filipino-American children has risen. Most of them have fathers who abandoned them as soon as these fathers were re-stationed. Amboy, played by Patrick Garcia, is one of the Fil-Am kids patiently anticipating his father's homecoming and yearning to meet him. Stories from Amboy's mom are the only things he knows about his father. His wish is granted when he finally meets his father. However, things don't turn out the way they were planned.

== Plot ==
The story is narrated by Amboy, who reflects on his mother's difficult upbringing in Olongapo City, Zambales. Tessie, raised by an abusive and neglectful mother, often felt isolated and resentful. One night, seeking escape, she finds work as a nightclub hostess, where she meets and falls in love with an American soldier named Michael Dahoff. Their relationship becomes complicated when Tessie's mother confronts them violently at their home. During this confrontation, it's revealed that Tessie is pregnant. She later gave birth to a son whom Michael named Christopher, who was then nicknamed “Amboy”. Shortly after Amboy's birth, Michael is reassigned overseas but promises to return to Tessie and Amboy one day.

Years later, Amboy is a teenager living in Manila with his mother, Tessie. After falling behind on rent, they temporarily stay with Tessie's friend Sarah before moving into a house in Aling Cedes' compound, where Tessie pays rent in advance. In the new neighborhood, Amboy makes friends with Angela, Aling Cedes' granddaughter, and Jessie, her son-in-law. Meanwhile, Tessie juggles various jobs and faces challenges, including a difficult boss. She eventually meets Danny, an executive, and they grow closer, leading to him moving in with them. However, Amboy resents Danny despite his efforts to provide for them. Tension escalates when a woman named Monica arrives, revealing a complicated situation with Danny, which culminates in a public confrontation as he forces her into a taxi, drawing the attention of their neighbors.

Tessie later confronts Danny about the woman, but Danny avoids the question and instead breaks a plate, hinting at the onset of domestic abuse. Meanwhile, Amboy and his friends face bullying from local teenagers who vandalize his bike. In retaliation, Amboy loosens the tires of a thug's car. Later, Danny confesses to Tessie that he was forced to resign by his boss over to sue him for stealing the debts from his job. They are then confronted by the thug's father, who blames Amboy for the car damage. To assert control, Danny punishes Amboy in front of the neighborhood, leaving Tessie in shock, and ending with Amboy sustaining bruises on his eye.

Danny has become a jobless, violent, and alcoholic man, while Tessie works at a restaurant. Soon, they learn from an organization that Tessie's father, Michael Dahoff, has returned to the country. Amboy reunites with Michael, who is now married with four children in Baltimore, Maryland. While Amboy is excited to receive gifts from his father, Tessie refuses them due to her resentment over being abandoned. Tensions rise when Danny steals money that Tessie received from Michael, leading to a violent confrontation where Amboy attacks Danny. The fight escalates, and Tessie ends up with bruises. Amboy suggests expelling Danny or running away, but Tessie fears Danny's potential revenge. When Amboy expresses his desire to live with Michael in the U.S., Tessie blames him for her struggles, prompting Amboy to consider leaving. However, Michael is hesitant to take Amboy without a valid reason. Before Amboy leaves, Michael gives him some money and promises to see him again, leaving Amboy feeling sad but accepting of the situation.

After Amboy leaves the hotel, Tessie confronts Danny, blaming him for stealing money she had hidden. In a fit of rage, Danny destroys the furniture he bought for her, leading Tessie to want to kick him out. However, he brutally beats her instead. When Amboy hears about his mother's situation from neighbors, he rushes home to find her with visible bruises. In her room, Tessie apologizes to Amboy for her past mistakes, and he promises to always be there for her.

The following night, a noise in the living room prompted Amboy to prepare for an intruder with a baseball bat, but Tessie took charge and confronted Danny, who was drunk and had been expelled from the home. When Danny woke up, he saw Tessie armed and was informed that he needed to leave and not return. He reacted with defiance, threatening them and asserting they couldn't survive without him. Enraged by his attitude, Tessie attacked him, leading to a struggle where Danny attempted to grab the bat. In the confrontation, Tessie ultimately struck Danny with the bat three times, fatally injuring him. The commotion drew attention from Aling Cedes and her family, who were horrified by the scene and revealed that Danny had a reputation for being dangerous in the neighborhood.

In the end, Amboy is the only male left in the family, as Tessie vows never to be in a relationship again. She starts a new day job at a salon, while Amboy focuses on his studies to avoid being uneducated. He also helps out as a mechanic with Jessie and his colleagues for daily allowances. The film concludes with Tessie and Amboy bonding after her shift as they spend time together at the mall.

== Cast ==
- Patrick Garcia as Christopher "Amboy" Dahoff: The titular Filipino teenager of American descent
- Zsa Zsa Padilla as Tessie: Amboy's mother who works as a singer at the nightclub
  - Laura James as young Tessie
- Edu Manzano as Danny: A car dealership executive who became Tessie's boyfriend
- Anna Larrucea as Angela: Aling Cedes' granddaughter and Jessie's niece
- Nida Blanca as Cedes: Amboy and Tessie's trusted landlady
- Cherry Pie Picache as Sarah
- Eula Valdez as Maribeth
- Piolo Pascual as Jessie: Aling Cedes' son and Amboy's co-worker at his vehicle repair service
- Ogie Diaz as Ramon: A sari-sari owner
- Chubi del Rosario as Macoy
- J.R. Herrera as Chok
- Gilleth Sandico as Laura
- Joshua Spafford as Michael Dahoff: Amboy's American father who hails from Baltimore, Maryland
- Don Laurel
- Mon Confiado as one of the neighborhood thugs

== Themes and allusions ==
Film critic and professor Patrick D. Flores described in his essay in 1998 that Patrick Garcia's character Amboy and the film's title as an allegory that references the Philippines being a "commissary of duty-free labor" for the Americans. The film references the presence of the American military forces in the country and their withdrawal in November 1992, its impact on society and economy, and the rising number of children who were abandoned by their American fathers.

== Production ==
Piolo Pascual, who was recently included in Star Circle's Batch 3, was first introduced to the film.

== Restoration ==
The film, whose negatives were in good condition, was restored by ABS-CBN Film Restoration, in partnership with Central Digital Lab. The restored version was premiered on May 10, 2016 (two days after Mother's Day) and it was attended by the film's stars Zsa Zsa Padilla and Patrick Garcia, cinematographer Ding Achacoso, musical scorer Nonong Buencamino, and assistant director Jerome Pobocan.

Almost two years after the restored version's theatrical release, it received a free-to-air television premiere on ABS-CBN on May 6, 2018. From the statistics of Kantar Media, the television broadcast of Batang PX received a rating of 3.7 percent, losing to GMA Network's broadcast of Game of Death II in which it received a rating of 4.3 percent.

== Reception ==
=== Accolades ===
Accolades received by Batang PX
Year	Award	Category	Recipient(s)	Result	Ref.
1997	21st Gawad Urian Awards	Best Film	Batang PX	Nominated	
1997	21st Gawad Urian Awards	Best Director	Jose Javier Reyes	Nominated	
1997	21st Gawad Urian Awards	Best Screenplay	Jose Javier Reyes	Nominated	
1997	21st Gawad Urian Awards	Best Actor	Patrick Garcia	Nominated	
1997	21st Gawad Urian Awards	Best Actress	Zsa Zsa Padilla	Won	
1997	21st Gawad Urian Awards	Best Cinematography	Ding Achacoso	Nominated	
1997	21st Gawad Urian Awards	Best Editing	Danny Gloria	Nominated	
1997	21st Gawad Urian Awards	Best Production Design	Benjie De Guzman	Nominated	
1998	46th FAMAS Awards	Best Actress	Zsa Zsa Padilla	Won	
1998	46th FAMAS Awards	German Moreno Youth Achievement Award	Patrick Garcia	Won	
1998	16th FAP Awards	Best Actor	Patrick Garcia	Nominated	
1998	16th FAP Awards	Best Actress	Zsa Zsa Padilla	Won (Note: Tied with Maricel Soriano.)	
1998	8th Young Critics' Circle Awards	Best Film	Batang PX (Jose Javier Reyes)	Won	
1998	8th Young Critics' Circle Awards	Best Performer	Patrick Garcia	Won	
1998	8th Young Critics' Circle Awards	Best Screenplay	Jose Javier Reyes	Won	
1998	8th Young Critics' Circle Awards	Best Editing	Danny Gloria	Nominated	
1998	8th Young Critics' Circle Awards	Best Cinematography and Visual Design	Ding Achacoso and Benjie De Guzman	Nominated	
1998	14th PMPC Star Awards for Movies	Best Movie Actor	Patrick Garcia	Won	
1998	14th PMPC Star Awards for Movies	Best Movie Actress	Zsa Zsa Padilla	Won	
1998	14th PMPC Star Awards for Movies	Best Original Screenplay	Jose Javier Reyes	Won	
1998	14th PMPC Star Awards for Movies	Best Editor	Danny Gloria	Won	

Patrick Garcia also won three more awards: two "Best Actor" awards at the 28th GMMSF Box Office Entertainment Awards and People's Choice Awards and one for "Best Young Performer" at the Parangal ng Bayan award.
