= 1999 Metro Manila Film Festival =

Film festival edition

- Date: December 25, 1999 to January 3, 2000
- Site: Manila

Highlights
- Best Picture: Muro-Ami
- Most awards: Muro-Ami (13)

The 25th Metro Manila Film Festival was held in Manila, Philippines starting December 25.

Once again, GMA Films received most of the awards for the film Muro-Ami, which won thirteen awards in the 1999 Metro Manila Film Festival including the Best Picture, Gatpuno Antonio J. Villegas Cultural Awards and Best Director for second consecutive time winner Marilou Diaz-Abaya among others. Meanwhile, Viva Films' Bulaklak ng Maynila received five awards including the Best Actor for fifth-time winner Christopher de Leon, Best Actress for Elizabeth Oropesa and the Second Best Picture Award. The Third Best Picture Award goes to Regal Films' Sa Piling ng mga Aswang while the Best Float during the festival's parade goes to Millennium Films' Pepeng Agimat.

== Entries ==
| Title | Starring | Studio | Director | Genre |
|---|---|---|---|---|
| Ako ang Lalagot ng Hininga Mo | Dan Alvaro, Dante Varona, Rufa Mae Quinto, Daisy Reyes, Erick Esguerra, Bernard Bonnin, Maggie dela Riva, Erie Zarate, Gabriel Romulo, Nick Romano, Romy Diaz, Roberto Gonzales | MHR Productions | Rene Balan | Action, Adventure |
| Bulaklak ng Maynila | Christopher de Leon, Elizabeth Oropesa, Angelu de Leon, Jomari Yllana, Bembol Roco, Jake Roxas | VIVA Films | Joel Lamangan | Drama |
| Esperanza: The Movie | Judy Ann Santos, Wowie de Guzman, Piolo Pascual, Dante Rivero, Charo Santos-Concio, Joel Torre, Marvin Agustin, Lito Legaspi, Bembol Roco, Elizabeth Oropesa, Rosa Rosal, Chat Silayan, Angelika dela Cruz | Star Cinema | Jerry Lopez Sineneng | Crime, Drama, Family |
| Muro-Ami | Cesar Montano, Amy Austria, Pen Medina, Jhong Hilario, Rebecca Lusterio | GMA Films | Marilou Diaz-Abaya | Action, Adventure, Drama |
| Pepeng Agimat | Ramon 'Bong' Revilla, Princess Punzalan, Dennis Padilla, Jess Lapid, Jr., Vanessa del Bianco, Gladys Reyes, LJ Moreno | Millennium Cinema | Felix Dalay | Action, Adventure, Fantasy |
| Sa Piling ng Aswang | Maricel Soriano, Gina Alajar, Gardo Versoza, Manilyn Reynes | Regal Films | Peque Gallaga and Lore Reyes | Horror |

== Winners and nominees ==
=== Awards ===
Winners are listed first and highlighted in boldface.

| Best Film | Best Director |
|---|---|
| **Muro-Ami - GMA Films**; Bulaklak ng Maynila - VIVA Films (2nd Best Picture); Sa Piling ng Aswang - Regal Films (3rd Best Picture) | **Marilou Diaz-Abaya - Muro-Ami** |
| Best Actor | Best Actress |
| **Christopher de Leon – Bulaklak ng Maynila** | **Elizabeth Oropesa – Bulaklak ng Maynila** |
| Best Supporting Actor | Best Supporting Actress |
| **Pen Medina – Muro-Ami** | **Angelu de Leon – Bulaklak ng Maynila** |
| Best Cinematography | Best Production Design |
| **Rody Lacap - Muro-Ami** | **Leo Abaya - Muro-Ami** |
| Best Child Performer | Best Editing |
| **Rebecca Lusterio - Muro-Ami** | **Jess Navarro and Manet Dayrit - Muro-Ami** |
| Best Original Story | Best Screenplay |
| **Marilou Diaz-Abaya, Ricardo Lee and Jun Lana - Muro-Ami** | **Ricardo Lee and Jun Lana - Muro-Ami** |
| Best Original Theme Song | Best Musical Score |
| **Vehnee Saturno ("Anong Daling Sabihin") - Bulaklak ng Maynila** | **Nonong Buencamino - Muro-Ami** |
| Best Visual Effects | Best Make-up Artist |
| **Marc Ambat (Optima Digital) - Muro-Ami** | - |
| Best Sound Recording | Best Float |
| **Albert Michael Idioma - Muro-Ami** | **Pepeng Agimat - Millennium Cinema** |
Gatpuno Antonio J. Villegas Cultural Awards
**Muro-Ami - GMA Films**

== Multiple awards ==
| Awards | Film |
|---|---|
| 13 | Muro-Ami |
| 5 | Bulaklak ng Maynila |
| 2 | Sa Piling ng mga Aswang |

== Box Office gross ==
Final figures as of January 3, 2000.

| Entry | Gross Ticket Sales |
|---|---|
| Muro-Ami | ₱ 66,987,181* |
| Pepeng Agimat | ₱ 32,334,365 |
| Sa Piling ng Aswang | ₱ 24,567,732 |
| Bulaklak ng Maynila | ₱ 17,922,964 |
| Esperanza: The Movie | ₱ 16,735,635 |
| Ako ang Lalagot ng Hininga Mo | ₱ 2,120,501 |
| TOTAL | ₱ 160,668,378 |

| Preceded by 1998 Metro Manila Film Festival | Metro Manila Film Festival; 1999 | Succeeded by 2000 Metro Manila Film Festival |
