= 2001 Metro Manila Film Festival =

Film festival edition

- Date: December 25, 2001 to January 3, 2002
- Site: Manila

Highlights
- Best Picture: Yamashita: The Tiger's Treasure
- Most awards: Yamashita: The Tiger's Treasure (11)

Television coverage
- Network: RPN

The 27th Metro Manila Film Festival was held in Manila, Philippines starting December 25, 2001 to January 3, 2002.

Award-winning actor Cesar Montano, newcomer Assunta de Rossi and the film Yamashita: The Tiger's Treasure topped the 2001 Metro Manila Film Festival. Montano and De Rossi took home the Best Actor and Best Actress awards for their performances in the films Bagong Buwan and Hubog respectively. Bagong Buwan and Hubog made it to the top three Best Picture honors. Nevertheless, MAQ Productions' Yamashita: The Tiger's Treasure still leads the awards which won a total of eleven awards including the Best Picture and Best Director for Chito Rono among others. de Rossi's younger sister, Alessandra de Rossi was named Best Supporting Actress for Hubog, while Ronnie Lazaro received the Best Supporting Actor award for Bagong Buwan. The latter film also received five other awards including the Best Child Performer for Jiro Manio, Second Best Picture and the recipient of Gatpuno Antonio J. Villegas Cultural Award.

== Entries ==
The official entries were announced in October 2001. Among the film submissions that were rejected by the festival were Hesus, Rebolusyonaryo from writer-director Lav Diaz, Got 2 Believe from director Olivia Lamasan, and the action comedy Walang Iwanan... Peksman! from director Toto Natividad, the latter starring then-convicted actor Jinggoy Estrada.

Title	Starring	Studio	Director	Genre
Bagong Buwan	Cesar Montano, Jericho Rosales, Amy Austria, Caridad Sanchez, Jiro Manio, Ronnie Lazaro	Star Cinema	Marilou Diaz-Abaya	War drama
Bahay ni Lola	Gloria Romero, Aiza Seguerra, Manilyn Reynes, Gina Alajar, James Blanco, Maybelyn dela Cruz, Maxene Magalona, Miko Sotto, Isabella de Leon, Allan K.	Regal Films	Uro Q. dela Cruz	Horror comedy
Di Kita Ma-Reach	Mikey Arroyo, LJ Moreno, Eula Valdez, Tonton Gutierrez, Ana Capri, Raymond Bagatsing	ECorp Films	Wilfredo 'Willy' Milan	Action comedy drama
Hubog	Jay Manalo, Wendell Ramos, Alessandra de Rossi, Assunta de Rossi	Good Harvest Productions	Joel Lamangan	Crime drama
He...Susmaryosep! (4 Fathers)	Bobby Andrews, Bojo Molina, Polo Ravales, Gerard Madrid	Maverick Films	Edgardo 'Boy' Vinarao	Comedy drama
Tatarin	Dina Bonnevie, Edu Manzano, Rica Peralejo, Raymond Bagatsing, Carlos Morales, Patricia Javier	Viva Films	Tikoy Aguiluz	Romance
Yamashita: The Tiger's Treasure	Danilo Barrios, Camille Prats, Armando Goyena, Rustom Padilla, Carlo Munoz, Vic Diaz, Tetsuya Matsui, Albert Martinez	MAQ Productions	Chito Roño	Action adventure

== Winners and nominees ==
=== Awards ===
Winners are listed first and highlighted in boldface.

Best Film	Best Director
**Yamashita: The Tiger's Treasure - MAQ Productions**; Bagong Buwan - Star Cinema (2nd Best Picture); Hubog - Good Harvest Productions (3rd Best Picture); Susmaryosep! Four Fathers - Maverick Films; Di Kita Ma-reach - MAQ Productions; Tatarin - VIVA Films; Bahay ni Lola - Regal Films	Chito Roño - Yamashita: The Tiger's Treasure
Best Actor	Best Actress
**Cesar Montano – Bagong Buwan**	Assunta de Rossi – Hubog
Best Supporting Actor	Best Supporting Actress
**Ronnie Lazaro – Bagong Buwan**	Alessandra de Rossi – Hubog
Best Cinematography	Best Production Design
**Neil Daza - Yamashita: The Tiger's Treasure**	Fernan Santiago and Max Paglinawan - Yamashita: The Tiger's Treasure
Best Child Performer	Best Editing
**Jiro Manio - Bagong Buwan**	Manet Dayrit - Yamashita: The Tiger's Treasure
Best Original Story	Best Screenplay
**Roselle Monteverde-Teo, Roy Iglesias and Chito Rono - Yamashita: The Tiger's Treasure**	Roy Iglesias and Chito Rono - Yamashita: The Tiger's Treasure
Best Original Theme Song	Best Musical Score
**Joey Ayala ("Walang Hanggang Paalam") - Bagong Buwan**	Nonong Buencamino - Bagong Buwan
Best Visual Effects	Best Make-up Artist
**Roadrunner Network, Inc. - Yamashita: The Tiger's Treasure**	Warren Munar - Yamashita: The Tiger's Treasure
Best Sound Recording	Best Float
**Albert Michael Idioma - Yamashita: The Tiger's Treasure**	Yamashita: The Tiger's Treasure - MAQ Productions
Gatpuno Antonio J. Villegas Cultural Awards
**Bagong Buwan - Star Cinema**

== Multiple awards ==
Awards	Film
11	Yamashita: The Tiger's Treasure
7	Bagong Buwan
3	Hubog

== Ceremony information ==
=== Disappointment towards the Best Picture ===
During the "Gabi ng Parangal" held at the PICC Plenary Hall on December 27, Cesar Montano, while receiving the Best Actor award, expressed his disappointment that his film, Bagong Buwan did not win the Best Picture award. He states: "For me, Bagong Buwan is still the best picture. No offense meant, but for others, Yamashita may be the best picture. Kanya-kanya 'yan. Wala nga lang kaming trophy. Bibili na lang kami ng trophy sa Recto. (To each his own. We just don't have a trophy. We'll just buy one in Recto)", referring to a strip on C.M. Recto Avenue in Manila notorious for manufacturing fake diplomas, certificates and trophies.

== Box Office gross ==
Final figures as of January 3, 2002.

Entry	Gross Ticket Sales
Bagong Buwan	₱ 38,115,631*
Bahay ni Lola	₱ 36,830,052
Yamashita: The Tiger's Treasure	₱ 23,840,110
Hubog	₱ 13,768,880
Tatarin	₱ 12,961,774
He...Susmaryosep! (4 Fathers)	₱ 1,872,713
Di Kita Ma-Reach	₱ 779,042
TOTAL	₱ 128,168,202

Preceded by 2000 Metro Manila Film Festival	Metro Manila Film Festival; 2001	Succeeded by 2002 Metro Manila Film Festival
