= Metro Manila Film Festival Award for Best Make-up Artist =

Annual Philippine film award

- Awarded for: Best achievement in makeup and hair-styling
- Country: Philippines
- Presented by: MMDA
- First award: 1990
- Currently held by: Ryan Panaligan & Erika Racela, Honor Thy Father (2015)
- Website: www.mmda.gov.ph/mmff/

The Metro Manila Film Festival Award for Best Make-up Artist is an award presented annually by the Metropolitan Manila Development Authority (MMDA). It was first awarded at the 16th Metro Manila Film Festival ceremony, held in 1990; Denni Tan, Dominique Nazareth and Andrea Manahan won the award for their make-up in Shake, Rattle & Roll II and it is given to make-up artists and hair-stylists who demonstrate skills in cosmetics in a motion picture. Currently, nominees and winners are determined by Executive Committees, headed by the Metropolitan Manila Development Authority Chairman and key members of the film industry.

== Winners and nominees ==
=== 1990s ===
Year	Film	Make-up Artist(s)	Ref
1990 (16th)	Shake, Rattle & Roll II	Denni Tan, Dominique Nazareth and Andrea Manahan	
1991 (17th)	Darna	Cecille Baun	
1992 (18th)	Shake, Rattle & Roll IV	Andrea Manahan	
1993 (19th)	Gaano Kita Kamahal	Teresita Dominguez	
1994 (20th)	Ang Pagbabalik ni Pedro Penduko	Rey Salamat	
1995 (21st)	-	-	
1996 (22nd)	Magic Temple	Siony Tolentino	
1997 (23rd)	Magic Kingdom	Manuel Benito	
1998 (24th)	José Rizal	Dennis Tan	
1999 (25th)	-	-	

=== 2000s ===
Year	Film	Make-up Artist(s)	Ref
2000 (26th)	Spirit Warriors	Cecile Baun, Benny Batoctoy and Warren Munar	
2001 (27th)	Yamashita: The Tiger's Treasure	Warren Munar	
2002 (28th)	Spirit Warriors: The Shortcut	Warren Munar	
2003 (29th)	Fantastic Man	Florencio Pinero, Gretta Estoesta, and Oscar Buara	
2004 (30th)	Enteng Kabisote: Okay ka, Fairy Ko: The Legend	Alex Vicencio	
2005 (31st)	Exodus: Tales from the Enchanted Kingdom	Baby Lucero	
2006 (32nd)	Tatlong Baraha	Baby Lucero	
2007 (33rd)	Desperadas	Rosalinda Lopez	
2008 (34th)	Desperadas 2	Noli Villalobos	
2009 (35th)	Shake, Rattle & Roll 11	Noel Flores	

=== 2010s ===
Year	Film	Make-up Artist(s)	Ref
2010 (36th)	Si Agimat at si Enteng Kabisote		
2010 (36th)	Super Inday and the Golden Bibe	Nestor Dayao, et al.	
2011 (37th)	Enteng Ng Ina Mo	Florencia Penero, Niccolo Medina, Jayvee Flores	
2012 (38th)	El Presidente	Warren Munar, Benny Batoctoy and Virginia Apolinario	
2013 (39th)	Pagpag: Siyam na Buhay		
2014 (40th)	Kubot: The Aswang Chronicles	Juvan Bermil and Charles Alabado	
2015 (41st)	Honor Thy Father	Ryan Panaligan & Erika Racela	
2015 (41st)	Nilalang	Richard Carvajal & Alice Soro Collara	
2015 (41st)	Buy Now, Die Later	Lei Ponce	
