= Hawak Ko ang Langit =

2003 Philippine television drama series

- Also known as: Heaven in My Hands
- Genre: Drama
- Directed by: Gina Alajar
- Starring: Assunta de Rossi; Jomari Yllana
- Theme music composer: Joey de Leon
- Opening theme: "Hawak Ko ang Langit" by On Air Band
- Country of origin: Philippines
- Original language: Tagalog
- No. of episodes: 85

Production
- Executive producers: Antonio P. Tuviera; Malou Choa-Fagar
- Producer: Antonio P. Tuviera
- Camera setup: Multiple-camera setup
- Running time: 30 minutes
- Production company: TAPE Inc.

Original release
- Network: GMA Network
- Release: July 14 – November 7, 2003

Hawak Ko ang Langit (transl. I hold the heaven / international title: Heaven in My Hands) is a 2003 Philippine television drama series broadcast by GMA Network. Directed by Gina Alajar, it stars Assunta de Rossi and Jomari Yllana. It premiered on July 14, 2003. The series concluded on November 7, 2003, with a total of 85 episodes.

== Cast and characters ==
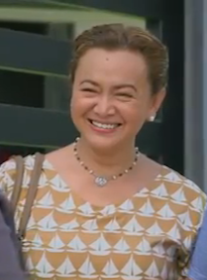
Sharmaine Buencamino

Lead cast

- Assunta de Rossi as Lorena
- Jomari Yllana as Julian

Supporting cast

- Melanie Marquez as Amapolla
- Regine Tolentino as Rebecca
- Rustom Padilla (now known as BB Gandanghari)
- Jeffrey Quizon
- Jao Mapa
- Jake Roxas
- Carlos Morales
- John Apacible
- Shamaine Centenera-Buencamino
- Nonie Buencamino
- Anna Larrucea
- Sarah Jane Abad
- Shyr Valdez
- BJ de Jesus
