= Miko Palanca =

Filipino actor and model (1978–2019)

- Born: Miko Revilla Palanca; February 3, 1978; Pasay, Metro Manila, Philippines
- Died: December 9, 2019 (aged 41); San Juan, Metro Manila, Philippines
- Other name: Mico
- Occupations: Actor and model
- Years active: 2000–2019
- Relatives: Bernard Palanca; Armando Goyena

Miko Revilla Palanca (February 3, 1978 – December 9, 2019) was a Filipino character actor and model.

== Life and career ==
His older brother Bernard Palanca is also an actor, as was his maternal grandfather Armando Goyena. He had Chinese ancestry from his paternal family.

He played roles in primetime dramas such as Kay Tagal Kang Hinintay and It Might Be You, where he starred alongside Bea Alonzo, whom he dated for 5 years. Palanca played Zossimo in the 2006 "Sineserye" Bituing Walang Ningning and was also part of the cast of Palos in 2008. He last made a television appearance on the ABS-CBN network in the 14th installment of the afternoon drama series Precious Hearts Romances Presents: Lumayo Ka Man Sa Akin in 2012

In mid-2012, he signed a contract with GMA Network thereby ending his career in ABS-CBN that started in 2000. He also worked as a freelance actor appearing on all TV networks.

== Death ==
On December 9, 2019, he died of suicide by jumping off a building in a residential area in Santolan Town in San Juan. It was rumored that he suffered from depression related to his love life.

His crypt and remains shares with his grandparents Paquita and Armando Goyena at Santuario De San Antonio in Forbes Park, Makati.

== Filmography ==
=== Film ===
| Year | Title | Role | Notes | Source |
|---|---|---|---|---|
| 2001 | Yamashita: The Tiger's Treasure | Vince | | |
| 2002 | Burles King Daw, O! | Raffy | Credited as Mico Palanca | |
| 2003 | My First Romance | Kiko | Segment: "Two Hearts" | |
| 2004 | Otso-Otso Pamela-Mela Wan | Gino Ronquillo | | |
| 2005 | Dreamboy | Dave | | |
| 2006 | All About Love | Rob | | |
| 2006 | Rome & Juliet | Carlo | | |
| 2006 | Shake, Rattle & Roll 8 | Rico | Segment: "LRT" | |

=== Television ===
| Year | Title | Role | Notes | Source |
|---|---|---|---|---|
| 2000 | Tabing Ilog | Perry Sanchez | | |
| 2000 | Pangako Sa 'Yo | Lia's friend | | |
| 2001 | Click | Louie | Episode: "...Nung Nagka-ampon sila Gio..." | |
| 2002 | K2BU | | | |
| 2002 | Kay Tagal Kang Hinintay | | | |
| 2003 | It Might Be You | Romer | | |
| 2003 | Buttercup | Chris | | |
| 2003 | Maalaala Mo Kaya | Alexander Robert "AR" Santiago | Episode: "Puno" | |
| 2005–2006 | Ang Panday | Alfred | | |
| 2006 | Bituing Walang Ningning | Zossimo | | |
| 2006 | Komiks Presents: Si Pardina At Ang Mga Duwende | | | |
| 2006 | Komiks Presents: Da Adventures of Pedro Penduko | Kasimiro | | |
| 2008 | Palos | Kim Yung Joo | | |
| 2009 | May Bukas Pa | Bong | | |
| 2010 | Precious Hearts Romances Presents: Love Is Only In The Movies | Dennis | | |
| 2010 | Your Song Presents: Gimik 2010 | Eugene | | |
| 2011 | Babaeng Hampaslupa | Young George Wong | | |
| 2012 | Precious Hearts Romances Presents: Lumayo Ka Man Sa Akin | Greg | | |
| 2012 | Personalan | Celebrity Uzi | | |
| 2013 | Maalaala Mo Kaya | Alfred | Episode: "Altar" | |
| 2013 | Huwag Ka Lang Mawawala | Ramon | | |
| 2015 | Kapamilya Deal or No Deal | Briefcase Number 10 | | |
| 2015 | Pablo S. Gomez's Inday Bote | Robert | | |
| 2016 | FPJ's Ang Probinsyano | Jake | | |
| 2018 | Bagani | Biber | | |
| 2019 | Nang Ngumiti ang Langit | young Gabriel | | |

=== Music video ===
- This Guy's In Love With You Pare by Parokya Ni Edgar
