= The Comeback (2015 film) =

- Film Poster
- Directed by: Ivan Andrew Payawal
- Starring: Kaye Abad; Sheena Ramos; Valeen Montenegro; Matt Evans
- Release date: November 9, 2015 (Cinema One Originals Digital Film Festival)
- Country: Philippines
- Language: Filipino

The Comeback is a 2015 Filipino independent comedy film. It was nominated for Best Film, Best Actress, and Best Director in the 2015 Cinema One Originals Film Festival, but failed to win any awards.

== Plot ==
The story follows a 32-year-old formerly famous actress who loses everything in her life and decides to commit suicide. On the day she decides to kill herself, she receives a package containing four letters and a dead man's ashes.

== Cast ==
- Kaye Abad as Angela
- Sheena Ramos as Beng
- Valeen Montenegro as Aurora
- Matt Evans
- Patrick Garcia
- Maria Isabel Lopez

== Reception ==
Writing in the Philippine Daily Inquirer, entertainment editor Rito P. Asilo remarked on the "riotous ludicrousness" of this "wacky comedy" that "fail[s] to say anything significant", while an ABS-CBN reviewer focused on the quality of the lead's acting, saying that "Kaye Abad shines in her role as Angela Velasco".
