= 1990 Metro Manila Film Festival =

Philippine film festival

- Date: December 25, 1990 to January 3, 1991
- Site: Manila

Highlights
- Best Picture: Andrea, Paano Ba ang Maging Isang Ina?
- Most awards: Andrea, Paano Ba ang Maging Isang Ina? (11)

Television coverage
- Network: Islands TV-13

The 16th Metro Manila Film Festival was held in 1990. There are six official entries in the festival, including the return of the Shake, Rattle & Roll film series.

MRN Film International's Andrea, Paano Ba ang Maging Isang Ina? topped the 1990 Metro Manila Film Festival with eleven awards, including Best Picture, Best Actress for Nora Aunor, and Best Director for Gil Portes, among others. Other awardees included Dolphy for Best Actor, while his son Vandolph Quizon won Best Child Performer in a tie with Guila Alvarez.

This year's festival also added two new categories, Best Visual Effects and Best Make-up, both of which were won by Shake, Rattle & Roll II. It also introduced the Gatpuno Antonio J. Villegas Cultural Awards category for the first time, received by Andrea, Paano Ba ang Maging Isang Ina?.

== Entries ==
| Title | Starring | Studio | Director | Genre |
|---|---|---|---|---|
| Ama...Bakit Mo Ako Pinabayaan? | Jestoni Alarcon, Gretchen Barretto, Sheryl Cruz, Ricky Belmonte, Robert Arevalo, Marita Zobel, Suzanne Gonzales, Jovit Moya | Seiko Films | Lino Brocka | Drama |
| Andrea, Paano Ba ang Maging Isang Ina? | Nora Aunor, Gina Alajar, Lloyd Samartino, Dan Alvaro, Perla Bautista, RR Herrera, Melissa Mendez, Juan Rodrigo, Susan Africa | MRN Film International | Gil Portes | Drama |
| Baril Ko... ang Uusig! | Ronnie Ricketts, Eddie Garcia, Michael de Mesa, Beverly Vergel, Sheila Ysrael, Maylene Zapanta | Lea Productions | Jose N. Carreon | Action |
| Espadang Patpat | Dolphy, Vandolph, Panchito, Marissa Delgado, Romy Diaz and Eric Quizon, Liz Alindogan, Charmaine Arnaiz, Leni Santos | AMS Productions | Efren Jarlego | Action, Comedy, Drama, Fantasy, Family |
| Shake, Rattle & Roll II | Episode 1: "Multo" – Cast: Janice de Belen, Eric Quizon, Eddie Gutierrez, Isabel Granada; Episode 2: "Kulam" – Cast: Joey Marquez, Carmina Villarroel, Daisy Romualdez, Sylvia Sanchez; Episode 3: "Aswang" – Cast: Manilyn Reynes, Aljon Jimenez, Ana Roces, Anjo Yllana, Richard Gomez, Vangie Labalan, Rez Cortez | Regal Films | Peque Gallaga and Lore Reyes | Horror, Comedy |
| Tumakbo Ka... Hanggang May Lupa | Baldo Marro, Isadora, Rhey Roldan, Dick Israel, Carol Dauden, Bobby Benitez, Robert Talby | ATB-4 Films International | Leonardo Pascual and Baldo Marro | Action |

== Winners and nominees ==
=== Current Categories ===
Winners are listed first and highlighted in boldface.

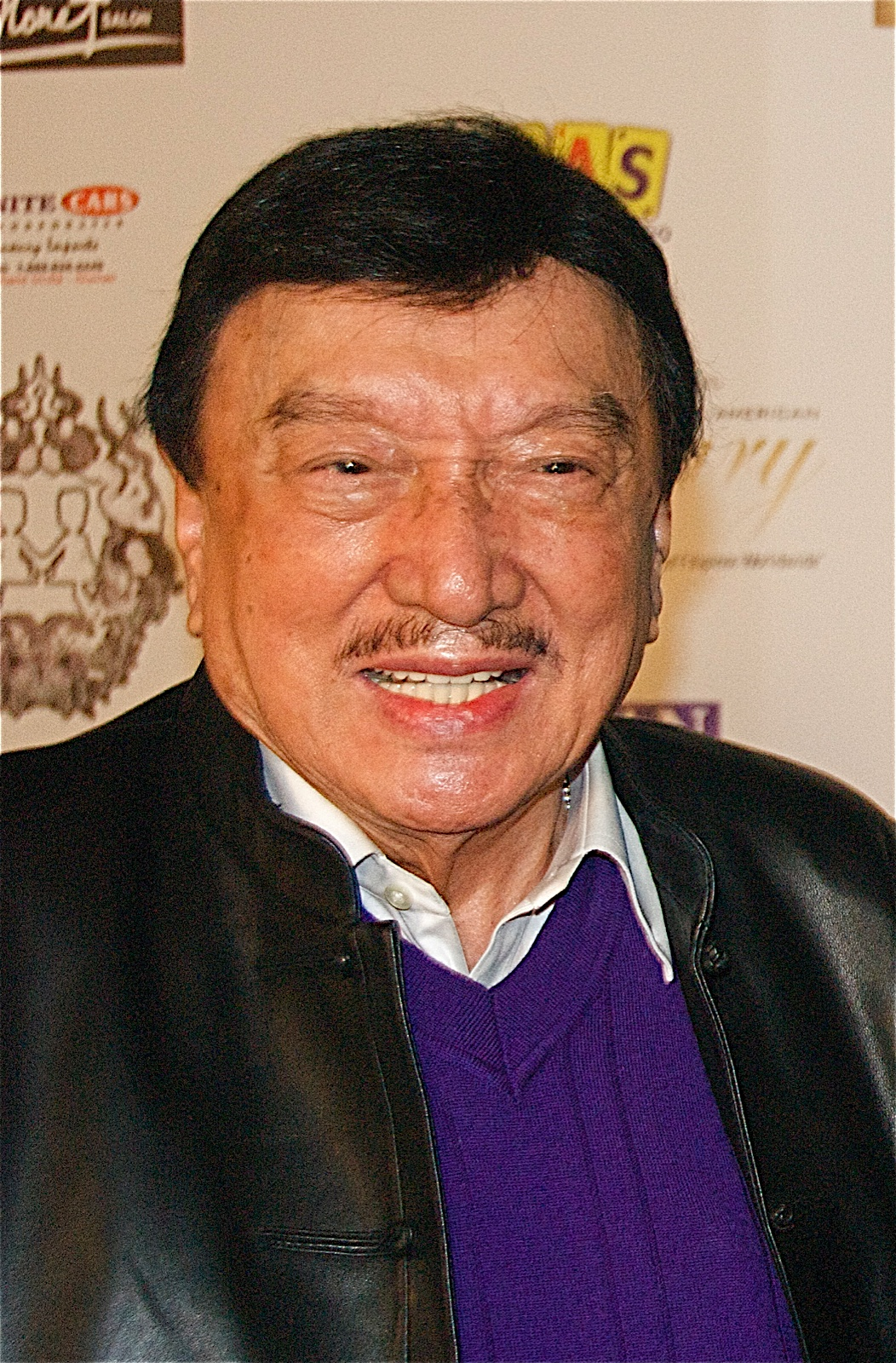
Dolphy, Best Actor winner

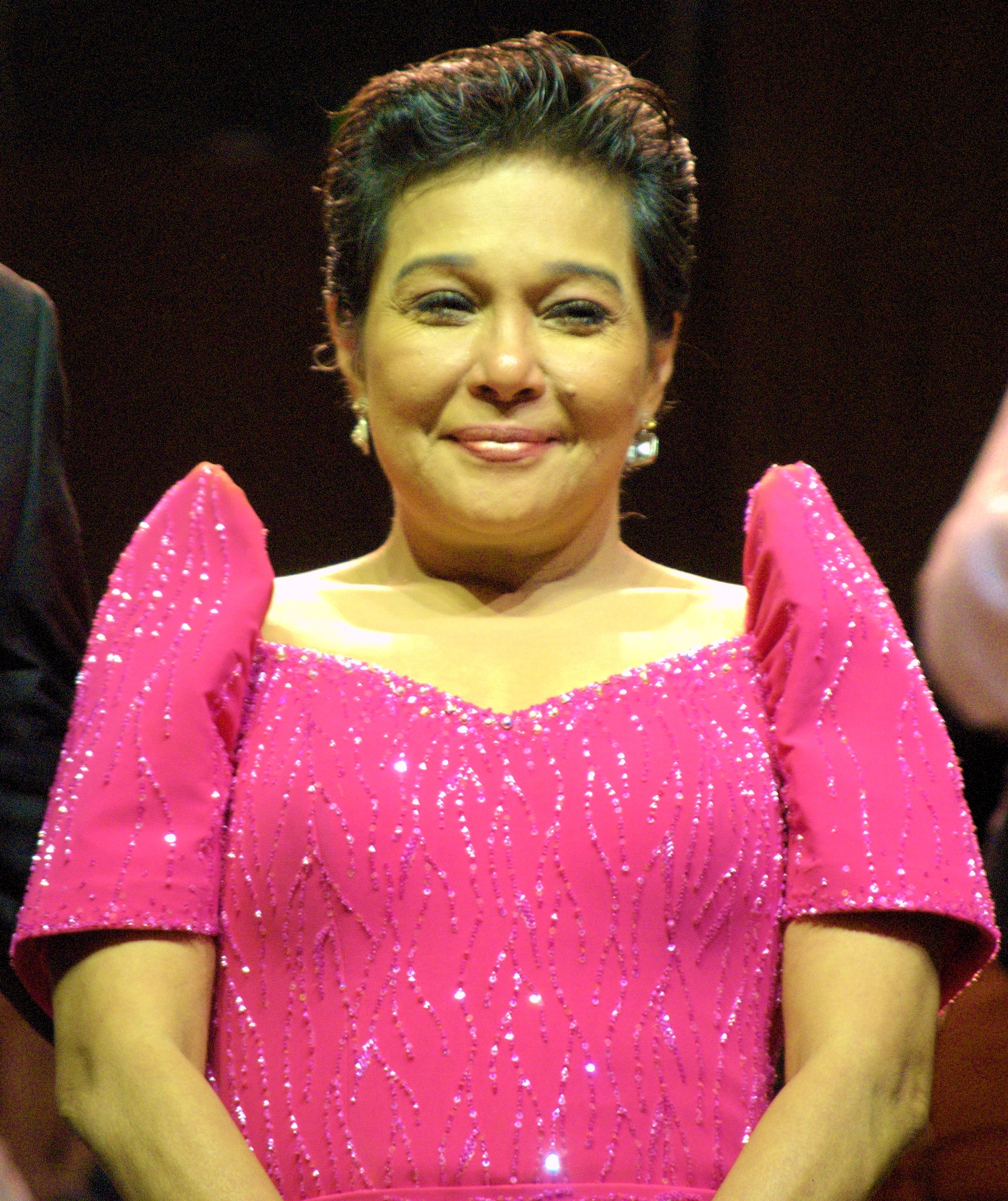
Nora Aunor, Best Actress winner

| Best Film | Best Director |
|---|---|
| **Andrea, Paano Ba ang Maging Isang Ina? – MRN Film International**; Ama, Bakit Mo Ako Pinabayaan? (2nd Best Picture); Tumakbo Ka... Hanggang May Lupa (3rd Best Picture); Espadang Patpat | Gil Portes – Andrea, Paano Ba ang Maging Isang Ina? |
| Best Actor | Best Actress |
| **Dolphy – Espadang Patpat** | Nora Aunor – Andrea, Paano Ba ang Maging Isang Ina? |
| Best Supporting Actor | Best Supporting Actress |
| **Robert Arevalo – Ama, Bakit Mo Ako Pinabayaan?** | Gina Alajar – Andrea, Paano Ba ang Maging Isang Ina? |
| Best Art Direction | Best Cinematography |
| **Don Escudero – Shake, Rattle & Roll II** | Pedro Manding – Ama Bakit Mo Ako Pinabayaan |
| Best Studio Sound Recording | Best Field Sound Recording |
| **Rolly Ruta – Andrea, Paano Ba ang Maging Isang Ina?** | Conrado Radoban – Ama Bakit Mo Ako Pinabayaan |
| Best Child Performer | Best Editing |
| **Guila Alvarez – Ama Bakit Mo Ako Pinabayaan** and; **Vandolph – Espadang Patpat**; RR Herrera – Andrea, Paano Ba ang Maging Isang Ina? | Boy Vinarao – Andrea, Paano Ba ang Maging Isang Ina? |
| Best Story | Best Screenplay |
| **Ricky Lee and Gil Portes – Andrea, Paano Ba ang Maging Isang Ina?** | Ricky Lee and Gil Portes – Andrea, Paano Ba ang Maging Isang Ina? |
| Best Original Song | Best Music |
| **Mon Faustino – Andrea, Paano Ba ang Maging Isang Ina?** | Mon Faustino – Andrea, Paano Ba ang Maging Isang Ina? |
| Best Visual Effects | Best Make-up |
| **Sammy Arranzamendez and Benny Batoccoy – Shake, Rattle & Roll II** | Denni Tan, Dominique Nazareth and Andrea Manahan – Shake, Rattle & Roll II |
Gatpuno Antonio J. Villegas Cultural Awards
**Andrea, Paano Ba ang Maging Isang Ina? – MRN Film International**

=== Special awards ===
| **Best Dressed Actor** | Ricky Belmonte |
| **Best Dressed Actress** | Star Querubin |

== Multiple awards ==
| Awards | Film |
|---|---|
| 11 | Andrea, Paano Ba ang Maging Isang Ina? |
| 5 | Ama Bakit Mo Ako Pinabayaan? |
| 3 | Shake, Rattle & Roll II |
| 2 | Espadang Patpat |

== Ceremony Information ==
=== Gabi ng Parangal ===
The "Gabi ng Parangal" paid tribute to the "funny men and women of the Philippine entertainment and their important roles, especially in times of crisis".

- Hosts: Bert "Tawa" Marcelo

Nanette Inventor
Tessie Tomas

- Director of Proceedings: Al Quinn
- Anchorman: The Mongolian, Mr. Shoo Li (a.k.a. Jun Urbano)

| Preceded by 1989 Metro Manila Film Festival | Metro Manila Film Festival; 1990 | Succeeded by 1991 Metro Manila Film Festival |
