= RoadRunner (division) =

- Company type: division
- Industry: Visual effects Post-production
- Founded: 1989
- Defunct: 2013
- Headquarters: ABS-CBN Broadcasting Center, Diliman, Quezon City, Philippines
- Key people: Manet A. Dayrit; Abelle V. Serraon
- Owner: ABS-CBN Corporation
- Number of employees: 200+
- Parent: Star Cinema
- Divisions: Video Post; Audio Post; Pre Post; Starlab

Roadrunner Network, Inc. doing business as RoadRunner was a visual effects and post production company based in Quezon City, Philippines. It was a subsidiary of ABS-CBN Corporation until it was dissolved in 2013 and its assets were transferred to Star Cinema. In addition to films, Roadrunner was heavily engaged in the production of commercial advertisements.

== Notable projects ==
Some of the most notable projects undertaken by the firm are Puso ng Pasko (1998), Hiling (1998), Spirit Warriors (2000), Yamashita: The Tiger's Treasure (2001) (which earned Roadrunner a FAMAS Awards for best visual effects and best special effects), Spirit Warriors: The Shortcut (2003), Manoro (2006), Pisay (2007), Concerto (2008), Independencia (2009) the first Filipino film to be screened in the Un Certain Regard at the Cannes Film Festival, and RPG Metanoia (2010), the first feature length Filipino film to be presented in 3D.

In 2013, RoadRunner was merged to Star Cinema.

== Awards ==
Year	Award-Giving Body	Category	Work	Result
1997	Metro Manila Film Festival	Best Visual Effects	Magic Kingdom	Won
2000	Metro Manila Film Festival	Best Visual Effects	Spirit Warriors	Won
2001	Metro Manila Film Festival	Best Visual Effects	Yamashita: The Tiger's Treasure	Won
2002	Metro Manila Film Festival	Best Visual Effects	Spirit Warriors: The Shortcut	Won
2003	Metro Manila Film Festival	Best Visual Effects	Malikmata	Won
