= 1997 Metro Manila Film Festival =

Film festival edition

- Date: December 25, 1997 to January 3, 1998
- Site: Manila

Highlights
- Best Picture: Nasaan ang Puso
- Most awards: Nasaan ang Puso (10)

The 23rd Metro Manila Film Festival was held in 1997.

MaQ Productions' Nasaan ang Puso won the most awards at the festival with ten, including Best Picture, Best Actress for Maricel Soriano, Best Actor for Christopher de Leon and the Gatpuno Antonio J. Villegas Cultural Awards among others. Viva Films and Neo Films' Magic Kingdom followed with six awards including the Best Float and the Third Best Picture Award. Meanwhile, the Second Best Picture, Gem's Babae got four awards. The festival also showcased the first Filipino full-length animated film Adarna: The Mythical Bird.

== Entries ==
Title	Starring	Studio	Director	Genre
Adarna: The Mythical Bird	Voices of: Jolina Magdangal, Marvin Agustin, Boots Anson-Roa, Martin Nievera, Regine Velasquez	Guiding Light Productions and FLT Films International	Geirry A. Garccia	Musical, fantasy, adventure
Anak ng Bulkan	Tom Taus, Jr., Beth Tamayo, Amy Austria, Bembol Roco, Lloyd Samartino, Denise Joaquin	Premiere Entertainment Productions	Cirio H. Santiago	Adventure, drama, family, sci-fi
Babae	Nora Aunor, Judy Ann Santos, Jao Mapa, Nida Blanca, Mark Gil, Luis Gonzales	GEM	Lupita Kashiwahara	Drama
Magic Kingdom: Ang Alamat ng Damortis	Jason Salcedo, Junell Hernando, Janus del Prado, Anne Curtis, Mark Gil, William Martinez, Ramon Christopher, Maricel Laxa	VIVA Films and Neo Films	Peque Gallaga and Lore Reyes	Action, adventure, fantasy
Nasaan ang Puso	Christopher de Leon, Maricel Soriano, Judy Ann Santos, Spencer Reyes, Gina Pareno, Ronaldo Valdez	MAQ Productions	Chito Roño	Drama
Padre Kalibre	Eddie Garcia, Monsour Del Rosario, Eddie Gutierrez, Dan Fernandez, Aya Medel	Virtual Cinema International	Val Iglesias	Action, drama

== Winners and nominees ==
=== Awards ===
Winners are listed first and highlighted in boldface.

Best Film	Best Director
**Nasaan ang Puso - MaQ Productions**; Babae - GEM (2nd Best Picture); Magic Kingdom - Viva Films and Neo Films (3rd Best Picture)	Chito Roño - Nasaan ang Puso
Best Actor	Best Actress
**Christopher de Leon – Nasaan ang Puso**	Maricel Soriano – Nasaan ang Puso
Best Supporting Actor	Best Supporting Actress
**Ronaldo Valdez – Nasaan ang Puso**	Nida Blanca – Babae
Best Production Design	Best Cinematography
**Bradley J. Mayer - Magic Kingdom**	Richard Padernal - Magic Kingdom
Best Child Performer	Best Editing
-	Jaime Davila - Nasaan ang Puso
Best Original Story	Best Screenplay
**Ruel Bayani - Babae**	Roy Iglesias - Nasaan ang Puso
Best Original Theme Song	Best Musical Score
**Babae**	Jesse Lasaten - Nasaan ang Puso
Best Visual Effects	Best Make-up Artist
**Roadrunner Network, Inc. - Magic Kingdom**	Manuel Benito - Magic Kingdom
Best Sound Recording	Best Float
**Albert Idiona, Ronaldo Asis and Arnold Reodica - Nasaan ang Puso**	Magic Kingdom - VIVA Films and Neo Films
Gatpuno Antonio J. Villegas Cultural Awards
**Nasaan ang Puso - MaQ Productions**

== Multiple awards ==
Awards	Film
10	Nasaan ang Puso
6	Magic Kingdom
4	Babae

Preceded by 1996 Metro Manila Film Festival	Metro Manila Film Festival; 1997	Succeeded by 1998 Metro Manila Film Festival
