= Muro-Ami (film) =

- DVD cover of the film
- Directed by: Marilou Diaz-Abaya
- Screenplay by: Ricardo Lee; Jun Lana
- Story by: Marilou Diaz-Abaya
- Produced by: Butch Jimenez; Jimmy Duavit; Marilou Diaz-Abaya
- Starring: Cesar Montano
- Cinematography: Rody Lacap
- Edited by: Jesus Navarro
- Music by: Nonong Buencamino
- Production company: GMA Films
- Distributed by: GMA Films
- Release date: December 25, 1999
- Running time: 113 minutes
- Country: Philippines
- Language: Filipino
- Budget: ₱30 million
- Box office: ₱60 million

Muro-Ami (transl. Reef Hunters) is a 1999 Filipino adventure drama film co-produced and directed by Marilou Diaz-Abaya and written by Ricky Lee and Jun Lana from the director's original story concept. It stars Cesar Montano as Fredo, a ruthless captain of 150 muro-ami divers, who employ illegal fishing practices, such as pounding and crushing corals to scare fish, driving them towards the nets. It depicts one of the worst forms of child labor in the illegal fishing system.

Produced and distributed by GMA Films, the film was theatrically released on December 25, 1999, as one of the official entries to the 25th Metro Manila Film Festival, where it won 13 out of 14 nominations, including Best Picture.

In 2026, the film was digitally restored and remastered by Central Digital Lab.

== Plot ==
Fredo is a fisherman who has endured more than his share of hardship in life; his wife and child both perished in a boating accident, and today Fredo approaches each trip to the sea with the angry determination of a man out for revenge. Fredo commands a crew of young people from poor families as he takes his rattletrap ship into the ocean in search of fish that live along the reefs, snaring catch with an illegal netting system. Not all of Fredo's youthful sailors are willing to put up with his abusive arrogance, however, and even his father Dado and close friend Botong have grown weary of Fredo's tirades. Fredo's body is beginning to betray him as well, and as he and his crew damage the sea's reef beds in search of fish, no one is certain how much longer he will be able to continue.

== Cast ==
- Cesar Montano as Fredo Obsioma
- Pen Medina as Diosdado "Dado" Lacar
- Jhong Hilario as Botong Maldepena
- Amy Austria as Susan Bacor
- Rebecca Lusterio as Kalbo Kee
- Jerome Sales as Filemon Dolotallas
- Teodoro Penaranda Jr. as Tabugok
- Walter Pacatang as Tibo
- Ranilo Boquil as Kokoy
- Ariel Estoquia Mijos as Bahoy Ballasabas

== Reception ==
=== Accolades ===
Year	Awards	Category	Recipient	Result	Ref.
1999	Metro Manila Film Festival	Best Picture	Muro-Ami	Won	
1999	Metro Manila Film Festival	Best Director	Marilou Diaz-Abaya	Won	
1999	Metro Manila Film Festival	Best Actor	Cesar Montano	Nominated	
1999	Metro Manila Film Festival	Best Supporting Actor	Pen Medina	Won	
1999	Metro Manila Film Festival	Best Cinematography	Rody Lacap	Won	
1999	Metro Manila Film Festival	Best Production Design	Leo Abaya	Won	
1999	Metro Manila Film Festival	Best Editing	Jess Navarro and Manet Dayrit	Won	
1999	Metro Manila Film Festival	Best Child Performer	Rebecca Lusterio	Won	
1999	Metro Manila Film Festival	Best Original Story	Marilou Diaz-Abaya, Ricardo Lee and Jun Lana	Won	
1999	Metro Manila Film Festival	Best Screenplay	Ricardo Lee and Jun Lana	Won	
1999	Metro Manila Film Festival	Best Musical Score	Nonong Buencamino	Won	
1999	Metro Manila Film Festival	Best Visual Effects	Marc Ambat (Optima Digital)	Won	
1999	Metro Manila Film Festival	Best Sound Recording	Albert Michael Idioma	Won	
1999	Metro Manila Film Festival	Gatpuno Antonio J. Villegas Cultural Awards	Muro-Ami	Won	
