= He...Susmaryosep! (4 Fathers) =

Philippine comedy film

- Directed by: Edgardo "Boy" Vinarao
- Screenplay by: Jun Lana
- Story by: Edgardo "Boy" Vinarao
- Produced by: Eric Cuatico
- Starring: Bobby Andrews; Bojo Molina; Polo Ravales; Gerald Madrid
- Cinematography: Jun Pereira
- Edited by: Edgardo "Boy" Vinarao
- Music by: Tony Cortez
- Production companies: Maverick Films; Ideal Concept Production
- Distributed by: Maverick Films
- Release date: December 25, 2001
- Running time: 100 minutes
- Country: Philippines
- Languages: Filipino; English
- Box office: ₱1,872,713

He...Susmaryosep! (4 Fathers) (marketed as Susmaryosep! (4 Fathers)) is a 2001 Filipino comedy film written, edited and directed by Edgardo "Boy" Vinarao. The film stars Bobby Andrews, Bojo Molina, Polo Ravales and Gerald Madrid in their title roles. It was one of the entries in the 2001 Metro Manila Film Festival.

== Plot ==
The film revolves around the lives of four people with personal issues. Ep (Bobby) is a community priest who has a son with his former girlfriend (Sherilyn). Mon (Bojo) is a priest who struggles to deal with his alcoholic father. Jojo (Polo) is a seminarian whose journey to priesthood takes a turn when he meets an attractive woman in an outreach program. Dondon (Garald) is a closeted gay who joins the seminary to hide his sexuality.

Mon, known for being a parish priest in their community, and has been involved in social issues. He had a painful childhood especially with his father, causing him to hate him. However, he would often scold his mother for her fortune telling business, saying that it's the work of the devil. Ep, while saying his homily, was surprised with the arrival of his ex-girlfriend Carol. Ep decided to broke up with Carol after Ep decided to enter the priesthood when his father suffered a heart attack. Now separated with her husband, she's also a single mother to her son named Pikoy. Dondon, who came from a conservative family was shocked when he sees his former bestfriend who was now a transgender woman. Jojo, a young seminarian caught the attention of Maan, a young novice. When Carol went to Ep, she asked him to take care of Pikoy as she has to go to a different location. Ep agreed, and while Pikoy was with him, the latter would pull different pranks on him, especially when he ate a sandwich filled with worms. Dondon, now confused because of his sexuality was invited to the wedding of two gay men.

Ep then found out the reason why Carol would leave Pikoy to him, is because Carol has been diagnosed with cancer and is undergoing treatment. He was surprised that Pikoy is his son. Carol recalled that she and Ep had an intimate night together after their separation. She also said that her ex-husband was impotent and he never loved Pikoy causing their separation. Carol also said to Ep to take care of Pikoy if she dies. Because of this, Ep would spend more bonding moments with Pikoy, but never telling the truth until the proper time comes. Dondon, decided to accept a gig with his gay friends, but when they're about to look for men who will be able to do one night stand, they're arrested. Jojo sneaks to the convent and dressed as a nun. There, he and Maan shared an intimate kiss with each other, but they were caught by the nuns in the convent. When Mon paid a visit to his mother, he was surprised to see his father, wounded by a single gunshot. Still having bitterness in his heart, his mother told him that he's still his father. There, Mon ran to the nearest police precinct to apprehend his father, but he didn't continue. Now, he had to seek advice from God and to help him find forgiveness in his heart. Ep, decided to have a thanksgiving mass and invited his parents, Carol and Pikoy. Jojo, is now ready to leave the seminary and ask Maan to leave her convent life to spend their lives together. Dondon was investigated by his superiors about his arrest. There, he decided to accept whatever punishment they will give to him and is now happy that he knows his true identity. Jojo asked Maan to leave, but the latter refused and decided to stay in the convent, this pushed Jojo to back-out from his plan. Mon's father confessed to him and told him the reason why he was imprisoned when he was a child. Because he don't want his son to be a bad influence to him, but Mon never gave him a chance to be a father. With no other choice and because of his faith, Mon forgave his father. Ep presided his last Mass by confessing about the reason why he entered the priesthood. He said that his entry to the priesthood is for his father, saying that he would be recovered if Ep will serve God in his lifetime. There, he said that he will spend his remaining years for his family. He then introduced Carol and Pikoy as his family and was given a standing ovation by the congregation.

Dondon was expelled from his Presbyterial duties and decided to join his gay friends. Mon ran around and went to a cemetery where he visits a grave. It was the grave of his father, saying that his father died probably due to the gunshot wound he sustained. Ep voluntarily left the priesthood to be with Carol and Pikoy, while Jojo is now happy with his life without Maan.

== Cast ==
- Bobby Andrews as Fr. Ep
- Bojo Molina as Fr. Mon
- Polo Ravales as Fr. Jojo
- Gerald Madrid as Fr. Dondon
- Sherilyn Reyes as Carol
- Anne Lorraine as Sta. Ma-an
- Long Mejia as Fr. Eddie
- Mel Kimura as Sta. Chuchay
- Bryan Homecillo as Pikoy
- Odette Khan as Aling Merly
- Joey Padilla as Mang Gusting
- Albert Zialcita as Fr. Superior
- Rommel Bejar as Erica
- Anna Gonzales as Manang Grace

== Production ==
The film was first pitched by Boy Vinarao for Solar Films in June 2001, with Epy Quizon, Joel Torre, Gerard Madrid and Bojo Molina originally part of the cast. However, Solar backed out during the film's pre-production a couple of months later. Maverick Films, a company headed by former Viva producer Eric Cuatico, was tapped to produce the film, with Bobby Andrews and Polo Ravales replacing Epy and Joel respectively.
