= Spirit Warriors: The Shortcut =

2003 film by Chito S. Roño

- Collector's Edition DVD cover
- Directed by: Chito S. Roño
- Written by: Chito S. Roño; Roy C. Iglesias
- Screenplay by: Roy C. Iglesias
- Produced by: Sherida Monteverde; Douglas Quijano; Allan Escaño; Christopher Rodriguez
- Starring: Vhong Navarro; Jhong Hilario; Spencer Reyes; Danilo Barrios; Chris Cruz
- Cinematography: Neil Daza
- Edited by: Vito Cajili
- Music by: Jessie Lasaten
- Production companies: MAQ Productions; RoadRunner
- Distributed by: Regal Films
- Release date: January 1, 2003
- Running time: 102 minutes
- Country: Philippines
- Language: Filipino
- Budget: ₱80,000,000.00 (estimated)
- Box office: ₱76,777,542.95

Spirit Warriors: The Shortcut (also known as Spirit Warriors 2) is a 2003 Filipino fantasy horror adventure film directed by Chito S. Roño, and a sequel to the 2000 film Spirit Warriors. The film was written and directed by Chito S. Roño with screenplay by Roy C. Iglesias. It was distributed by Regal Films.

== Plot ==
Taking from where they last left off, Red and his gang are asked by Harry, a wealthy benefactor to complete a quest for him, and in exchange provide Red with a hefty payment. Red refuses, understanding that any connection to the supernatural could lead to trouble. Unfortunately, Red's grandmother suffers a stroke as he was refusing the offer, convincing him to take the quest. The quest was to find the missing piece of an Agimat (a mystical amulet which have powers to heal, protect its owner from harm, and even from death). His friends, Thor, Buboy, Jigger, and Ponce do not fully understand the task until they are given a warning by the Taga-Pagbantay (The Guardian), a mystical being which is a half-human and half-giant, told them that Red has joined a quest and needs their help. They suspected it is Harry's plan and make their way to their friend.

They arrive at an old ancestral house where they see Red lying on a sofa and unaware that his destiny was to search for the missing piece of agimat. The ancestral house turns out to be a portal or a "Shortcut" to the world of the dead and creatures of the unknown. They first encounter a Tikbalang (a large half horse and half man), followed by Aswangs (flesh-eaters) and Tiyanaks (baby-like flesh-eaters), then Mermaids in the river who bring them to the Lugar ng mga Alon (Land of the Waves) where Red and Thor fight with their doppelgangers and get the missing piece of the agimat. While Red and Thor are in the Land of the Waves; Jigger, Ponce, and Buboy find their way back to the world of the living. As Red finally has the missing piece, they decide to go back to the living. But their mission does not end here, they still have to do a final task: playing a deadly game of chase with dead people, only winning by saving the last card "The Ace of Diamonds" so that Red will share the same faith, and they travel back in time to give the agimat to the Babaylan (Witch Doctor) and give her eternal peace.

== Cast ==
=== Main roles ===
- Vhong Navarro as Thor
- Jhong Hilario as Buboy
- Spencer Reyes as Jigger
- Danilo Barrios as Red
- Christopher Cruz as Ponce
- Gloria Romero as Red's grandmother
- Jaime Fabregas as Sir Harry

=== Supporting roles ===
- Roy Alvarez as Nathan's stepfather
- Dexter Doria as Ponce's mother
- Connie Chua as the Babaylan
- Daniel Pasia as the church caretaker
- Marissa Sanchez as Thor's food crew partner
- Warren Austria as Tony
- Marlou Aquino as the Taga-pagbantay (The Guardian)

== Production ==
The majority of the visual effects were handled by Roadrunner Network, Inc. while the creature effects were done by Mountain Rock Productions.

== See also ==
- List of ghost films

== Awards ==
Year	Award-Giving Body	Category	Recipient	Result
2002	Metro Manila Film Festival	Third Best Picture	Spirit Warriors: The Shortcut	Won
2002	Metro Manila Film Festival	Best Visual Effects	Roadrunner Network, Inc.	Won
2002	Metro Manila Film Festival	Best Make-up Artist	Warren Munar	Won
