= Armando Goyena =

Filipino actor (1922–2011)

- Born: José Revilla é Irureta-Goyena, Jr. December 7, 1922; Manila, Philippine Islands
- Died: March 9, 2011 (aged 88); Manila, Philippines
- Occupation: Actor
- Years active: 1948–1958; Hiatus: 1958–1992; 1992–2004
- Spouse: Francisca "Paquita Rosés" Rocés y Gómez-Pastrano (m. 1952; died 2001)
- Children: Maritess Revilla de Araneta; Tina Revilla de Valencia; Jose "Johnny" Revilla III; Cecilia Revilla de Schulze; Pita Revilla de Hocson (formerly Palanca) (deceased); Rossi Revilla de Reyes; Malu Revilla de Soriano; Cita Revilla de Yabut

Jose "Pinggoy" Revilla, Jr. (December 7, 1922 – March 9, 2011), professionally known as Armando Goyena, was a Filipino actor and matinée idol who was popular during the 1950s.

== Family ==
Revilla was married to Francisca "Paquita" Roces and the couple had eight children: Maritess, Tina, Johnny, Ces, Pita, Rossi, Malu, and Cita. Two daughters became popular movie stars during the 1970s: Maritess and Tina Revilla. Among his grandchildren who joined show business are Bernard and Miko Palanca, Bianca Araneta and Lexi Schulze. His only son Jose or Johnny is also an actor and TV host of Pinoy Wrestling on PTV 4 in 1988.

== Movie career ==
Together with his onscreen movie partner, Tessie Quintana, Revilla appeared in Prinsesang Basahan, Hawayana, Tia Loleng, Virginia, and Isabelita. Goyena, together with Cecilia Lopez and Jonny Reyes, starred in Anak ng Berdugo. He stopped acting in 1958 after getting married.

He resumed acting in the early 1990s. In 1995, he played Don Eugenio López in Chito Roño’s Eskapo. Roño used him again in 2001 for Yamashita: The Tiger's Treasure. His final film appearance was Annie B. in 2004.

== Filmography ==
=== Film ===
Year	Title	Role	Ref(s).
1948	Sa Tokyo Ikinasal	Fidel	
1948	Kaaway ng Babae		
1949	Ibigin Mo Ako, Lalaking Matapang		
1950	Florante at Laura	Menandro	
1951	Pag-Asa	Victor	
1951	Talisman		
1952	Tiya Loleng		
1952	Tenyente Carlos Blanco	Tenyente Carlos Blanco	
1952	Amor Mio		
1953	Philippine Navy		
1953	Kapitan Kidlat	Kapitan Kidlat	
1953	Kapitan Kidlat Ngayon!	Kapitan Kidlat	
1954	Dalaginding		
1956	Welga		
1956	Medalyong Perlas		
1957	Sanga-Sangang Puso		
1957	El Robo	Rodrigo	
1958	Kastilaloy	Felipito	
1958	Casa Grande		Segment "Herederos"
1992	Mahal Kita, Walang Iba	Lolo Manolo	
1993	Ang Kuya Kong Siga		
1995	Eskapo	Don Eugenio Lopez Sr.	
1997	Wanted Perfect Murder	Mr. Payonggayong	
1998	Pagdating ng Panahon	Himself	
2001	Yamashita: The Tiger's Treasure	Carmelo Rosales	
2004	Annie B.	Alejandro	

=== Television ===
Year	Title	Role	Notes	Ref(s).
1988	Lovingly Yours, Helen			
1992–1995	Maalaala Mo Kaya	Various	3 episodes	
2000–2002	Wansapanataym	Various	2 episodes	

== Death ==
Goyena died on March 9, 2011, aged 88, from a pulmonary embolism. His crypt and remains shares with his wife Paquita, and grandson Miko Palanca at Santuario De San Antonio in Forbes Park, Makati in Makati.
