= Spirit Warriors (film) =

2000 film by Chito S. Roño

- DVD cover
- Directed by: Chito S. Roño
- Written by: Chito S. Roño; Roy Iglesias
- Produced by: Sherida Monteverde; Douglas Quijano
- Starring: Vhong Navarro; Jhong Hilario; Spencer Reyes; Danilo Barrios; Chris Cruz; Meynard Marcellano; Sherwin Roux; Nikko Manalo; Michael Foz-Sesmundo
- Cinematography: Neil Daza
- Edited by: Manet Dayrit
- Music by: Jessie Lasaten
- Production companies: MAQ Productions; RoadRunner
- Distributed by: Regal Films
- Release date: December 25, 2000
- Running time: 101 minutes
- Country: Philippines
- Language: Filipino
- Budget: ₱45 million (estimated)

Spirit Warriors (stylized as SPIRI† WARRIORS) is a 2000 Filipino fantasy horror film written and directed by Chito S. Roño. It was followed by a sequel, Spirit Warriors: The Shortcut, which was released on January 1, 2003.

== Premise ==
A group of amateur ghost hunters meet their biggest challenge yet, the Ulanaya, a malevolent elemental.

== Cast ==
=== Main roles ===
- Vhong Navarro as Thor
- Jhong Hilario as Buboy
- Spencer Reyes as Jigger
- Joel Torre as Roman
- Danilo Barrios as Red
- Chris Cruz as Ponce
- Meynard Marcellano as Dos
- Sherwin Roux as Nato
- Nikko Manalo as Levi
- Michael Foz-Sesmundo as Spike
- Denise Joaquin as Gretch

=== Supporting roles ===
- Pamela delos Santos as Fanny
- Fritz Ynfante as Father James
- Cris Vertido as Mr. Pio Andres
- Dexter Doria as Ms. Arriola
- Roy Alvarez as Steve
- Raul Dillo as The Ulanaya
- Dante Balois as Mang Guding
- Nanding Josef as Father Buane
- Cezar Xerez-Burgos as Father Virgilio
- Christian Alvear as Bong

== Production ==
The film was released by MAQ Productions while the majority of the visual effects were handled by Roadrunner Network, Inc.

== Accolades ==
Year	Award-Giving Body	Category	Recipient	Result
2000	Metro Manila Film Festival	Best Visual Effects	Roadrunner Network, Inc.	Won
2000	Metro Manila Film Festival	Best Make-up	Cecile Baun, Benny Batoctoy and Warren Munar	Won
2000	Metro Manila Film Festival	Best Float	Roadrunner Network, Inc.	Won

== See also ==
- List of ghost films
- Spirit Warriors: The Shortcut
- Spirits
