= Magic Temple =

- Remastered version theatrical release poster
- Directed by: Peque Gallaga; Lore Reyes
- Screenplay by: Peque Gallaga; Lore Reyes
- Story by: Peque Gallaga; Lore Reyes; Erik Matti
- Produced by: Charo Santos-Concio; Malou N. Santos; Trina N. Dayrit
- Starring: Jason Salcedo; Junell Hernando; Marc Solis; Anna Larrucea; Jun Urbano
- Cinematography: Joe Tutanes
- Edited by: Danny Gloria
- Music by: Archie Castillo
- Production company: Star Cinema
- Release date: December 25, 1996
- Running time: 106 minutes
- Country: Philippines
- Language: Filipino

Magic Temple is a 1996 Philippine family fantasy adventure film directed by director Peque Gallaga and his directing partner Lore Reyes from a story and screenplay they written, with Erik Matti as co-writer of the story. The film stars Jason Salcedo, Junell Hernando, and Marc Solis as the trio of young boys sent by their master to face the evil forces who try to destroy the world. It also stars Jackie Lou Blanco as Ravenal, the film's antagonist, Jun Urbano as Sifu, the trio's master, and Anna Larrucea as Yasmin.

Produced and released by Star Cinema, the film was theatrically released on December 25, 1996, as one of the official entries for the 22nd Metro Manila Film Festival, where it became a box office success and notable for winning all of the 14 nominations including the Best Film and Best Director awards. In 2016, the film was digitally restored and remastered by ABS-CBN Film Restoration, in partnership with Central Digital Lab.

== Synopsis ==
The magical world of "Samadhi" is threatened by Ravenal, an evil sorceress. Sifu, a mystical teacher, sends out three teenage boys, Jubal, Sambag and Omar in a perilous journey to save the kingdom. Each of them must hone their own unique skills and magical powers to battle their enemies. They also face many extraordinary things along the way. Still, with the help of magical creatures they meet on their journey, evil has been eradicated and they learn the true value of camaraderie and believing in themselves to face any problem.

== Cast ==
- Jason Salcedo as Jubal
- Junell Hernando as Sambag
- Marc Solis as Omar
- Anna Larrucea as Yasmin
- Jun Urbano as Sifu
- Jackie Lou Blanco as Ravenal
- Gina Pareño as Telang Bayawak
- Aljon Jimenez as Rexor
- Cholo Escaño as Sisig
- Koko Trinidad as Grand Master
- Sydney Sacdalan as Shaolin Child
- Chubi del Rosario as Gamay
- Mae-Ann Adonis as Rexor's mother
- Alvin Froy Alemania as young Sambag
- Tess Dumpit as Jubal's mother
- Kristopher Peralta as young Rexor
- Carlo Aquino as young Jubal

== Trivia ==
The names of the three main characters refer to the country's national symbolisms. Jubal is an Igorot, a tribe from Luzon; Sambag is from the Visayas, and his name is Visayan for Tamarind; and Omar is a name found among the Muslim tribes of Mindanao. The names, therefore, account for the Philippines' major islands.

== Reception ==
=== Accolades ===
Year	Award-giving body	Category	Recipient	Result
1996	Metro Manila Film Festival	Best Picture	Magic Temple	Won
1996	Metro Manila Film Festival	Best Director	Peque Gallaga and Lore Reyes	Won
1996	Metro Manila Film Festival	Best Screenplay	Peque Gallaga, Lore Reyes and Erik Matti	Won
1996	Metro Manila Film Festival	Best Original Story	Peque Gallaga, Lore Reyes and Erik Matti	Won
1996	Metro Manila Film Festival	Best Production Design	Rodell Cruz	Won
1996	Metro Manila Film Festival	Best Cinematography	Joe Tutanes	Won
1996	Metro Manila Film Festival	Best Editing	Danilo Gloria	Won
1996	Metro Manila Film Festival	Best Musical Score	Archie Castillo	Won
1996	Metro Manila Film Festival	Best Original Theme Song	Archie Castillo	Won
1996	Metro Manila Film Festival	Best Visual Effects	Benny Batoctoy	Won
1996	Metro Manila Film Festival	Best Make-up Artist	Siony Tolentino	Won
1996	Metro Manila Film Festival	Best Sound Recording	Michael Idioma and Ronald de Asis	Won
1996	Metro Manila Film Festival	Best Float	Magic Temple	Won
1997	FAMAS Awards	Best Sound	Michael Idioma and Ronald de Asis	Won
1997	FAMAS Awards	Best Child Actress	Anna Larrucea	Nominated
1997	FAMAS Awards	Best Supporting Actress	Gina Pareño	Nominated
1997	Gawad Urian Awards	Best Cinematography	Joe Tutanes	Nominated
1997	Gawad Urian Awards	Best Production Design	Rodell Cruz	Nominated

=== Special awards ===
Year	Award-giving body	Category	Recipient	Result
1996	Gatpuno Antonio J. Villegas Cultural Awards	Best Picture	Magic Temple	Won

== Remake ==
A remake of the film was announced in December 2018, to be produced by ABS-CBN and Cre8 Productions. Mikhail Red will direct the project.
