= Metro Manila Film Festival Award for Best Visual Effects =

Award presented annually by the Metropolitan Manila Development Authority (MMDA)

- Awarded for: Best achievement in visual effects
- Country: Philippines
- Presented by: MMDA
- First award: 1990
- Currently held by: Santelmo Inc., Shake, Rattle & Roll Evil Origins (2025)
- Website: www.mmda.gov.ph/mmff/

The Metro Manila Film Festival Award for Best Visual Effects is an award presented annually by the Metropolitan Manila Development Authority (MMDA). It was first awarded at the 16th Metro Manila Film Festival ceremony, held in 1990; Sammy Arranzamendez and Benny Batoccoy won the award for their creation of visual effects in Shake, Rattle & Roll II and it is given to an animator(s) who demonstrate great visual effects in a motion picture. Currently, nominees and winners are determined by Executive Committees, headed by the Metropolitan Manila Development Authority Chairman and key members of the film industry.

== Winners and nominees ==
=== 1990s ===
Year	Film	Animator(s)	Ref
1990 (16th)	Shake, Rattle & Roll II	Sammy Arranzamendez and Benny Batoccoy	
1991 (17th)	Darna	Carlos Lacap	
1992 (18th)	Okay Ka Fairy Ko! Part 2	Tony Marbella	
1992 (18th)	Engkanto	Rene Abadeza and Maurice Carvajal	
1992 (18th)	Takbo... Talon... Tili!!!	Manong Lacap	
1993 (19th)	Doring Dorobo: Hagupit ng Batas	Bobby Pineda	
1994 (20th)	Ang Pagbabalik ni Pedro Penduko	Cinemagic	
1995 (21st)	-	-	
1996 (22nd)	Magic Temple	Benny Batoctoy	
1997 (23rd)	Magic Kingdom	Roadrunner Network, Inc.	
1998 (24th)	José Rizal	Optimal Digital	
1999 (25th)	Muro-ami	Marc Ambat (Optimal Digital)	

=== 2000s ===
Year	Film	Animator(s)	Ref
2000 (26th)	Spirit Warriors	Roadrunner Network, Inc.	
2001 (27th)	Yamashita: The Tiger's Treasure	Roadrunner Network, Inc.	
2002 (28th)	Spirit Warriors: The Shortcut	Roadrunner Network, Inc.	
2003 (29th)	Malikmata	Dodge Ledesma and Roadrunner Network, Inc.	
2004 (30th)	Lastikman: Unang Banat	Fel Rodolfo	
2005 (31st)	Exodus: Tales from the Enchanted Kingdom	Ignite Media	
2006 (32nd)	Tatlong Baraha	Imaginary Friends	
2007 (33rd)	Resiklo	Ignite Media	
2008 (34th)	Dayo: Sa Mundo ng Elementalia	Robert Quilao	
2009 (35th)	Ang Panday	Jay Santiago	

=== 2010s ===
Year	Film	Animator(s)	Ref
2010 (36th)	Si Agimat at si Enteng Kabisote	Rico Guttierez	
2011 (37th)	Ang Panday 2	Riot Incorporated	
2011 (37th)	Manila Kingpin: The Asiong Salonga Story	Erick Torrente, Dave Yu & Rico Gutierrez	
2012 (38th)	Shake, Rattle and Roll Fourteen: The Invasion	Imaginary Friends Studios and Blackburst Inc.	
2013 (39th)	10,000 Hours	Central Digital Lab	
2013 (39th)	Boy Golden: Shoot to Kill	Mothership, Inc	
2013 (39th)	Girl, Boy, Bakla, Tomboy	Dodge Ledesma	
2013 (39th)	Kimmy Dora: Ang Kiyemeng Prequel	Optima Digital	
2013 (39th)	Pagpag: Siyam na Buhay	Blackburst, Inc	
2014 (40th)	Kubot: The Aswang Chronicles	Mothership, Inc.	
2014 (40th)	My Big Bossing	Digital Dodge	
2014 (40th)	Shake, Rattle & Roll XV	Imaginary Friends Studio	
2014 (40th)	Bonifacio: Ang Unang Pangulo	Post Manila	
2015 (41st)	Nilalang	Pedro Chuidian & Rommel Pambid	
2015 (41st)	Haunted Mansion	Imaginary Friends	
2015 (41st)	Buy Now, Die Later	John Kenneth Paclibar, Emman Bares, Raffy Legaspi & Jasper Bundoc	
2016 (42nd)	-	-	
2017 (43rd)	Ang Panday	Blackburst	
2017 (43rd)	Haunted Forest	Jux the Post	
2018 (44th)	Aurora	Ernest Villanueva & Gem Garcia	
2018 (44th)	Fantastica	Mothership	
2018 (44th)	Otlum	Ralph Soriano	
2019 (45th)	Mindanao	Team App	
2019 (45th)	Mission Unstapabol: The Don Identity	Santelmo	
2019 (45th)	Sunod	The Post Office	

=== 2020s ===
Year	Film	Animator(s)	Ref
2020 (46th)	Magikland	Richard Francia, Ryan Grimarez	
2020 (46th)	The Missing	Luminous Films	
2020 (46th)	Mang Kepweng: Ang Lihim ng Bandanang Itim	Gerwin Meneses	
2021 (47th)	Kun Maupay Man it Panahon	Ogie Tiglao	
2021 (47th)	Love at First Stream	Nickl Entertainment Corporation	
2022 (48th)	Deleter	Gaspar Mangalin	
2023 (49th)	Mallari	Gaspar Mangalin	
2023 (49th)	Firefly	Reality MM Studios	
2023 (49th)	GomBurZa	Brian Galagnara, Danilo Handog, and John Kenneth Paclibar	
2023 (49th)	Kampon	John Kenneth Paclibar	
2023 (49th)	Penduko	Gerwin Meneses	
2024 (50th)	The Kingdom	Riot Inc.	
2024 (50th)	Espantaho	Gaspar Mangarin and Walter Monte	
2024 (50th)	Isang Himala	Engine Room and Green Maya	
2024 (50th)	My Future You	Santelmo Studio Inc.	
2024 (50th)	Strange Frequencies: Taiwan Killer Hospital	Mothership Inc.	
2025 (51st)	Shake, Rattle & Roll Evil Origins	Santelmo Inc.	
2025 (51st)	Bar Boys: After School	John Kenneth Paclibar	
2025 (51st)	I'mPerfect	Mylav Infante	
2025 (51st)	Manila's Finest	Eoplus, Inc.	
2025 (51st)	Rekonek	Reality MM Studios Post	
