= Jun Urbano =

Filipino actor (1939-2023)

- Born: Manuel Salazar Urbano, Jr. 8 June 1939; Philippines
- Died: 2 December 2023 (aged 84); Manila, Philippines
- Occupations: Actor; comedian; director
- Years active: 1949-2023

Manuel “Jun” Salazar Urbano Jr. (June 8, 1939 – December 2, 2023) was a Filipino actor, comedian and director who was best known for his role as Mr. Shooli, a self-styled Mongolian character who specialized in political satire and commentaries on Philippine popular culture.

== Early life and education ==
Urbano was born on 8 June 1939 to film actor, director and producer Manuel Conde (born Manuel Urbano Sr.), who was posthumously recognized as a National Artist of the Philippines for Film and Broadcasting. He grew up as the eldest of nine siblings in Sampaloc, Manila and graduated from the Ateneo de Manila University with a degree in Journalism. Urbano decided to use his birth surname in his career to avoid being overtly associated with his father's stage name.

== Journalistic and directorial career ==
Urbano first worked as a reporter for the Manila Times but quit a few weeks into his job after experiencing discomfort while making a report on inmates at the Manila City Jail. He subsequently worked as an advertising director for 35 years, particularly in the late 1970s and early 1980s.

In his advertising career, Urbano was credited with producing more than two thousand TV commercials, In 1983, Urbano directed the San Miguel Beer commercial "Isang Platitong Mani" (lit. 'A Small Plate of Nuts'), which was adapted by Urbano into a feature film in 1985 and later deemed in 2002 as the best Philippine advertisement in the past 50 years by the Association of Accredited Advertising Agencies of the Philippines (AAAAP). Other commercials he directed that were included in AAAAP's list of best ads include "Billiards" (1988) for Gold Eagle Beer, "Bruno" (1977) for San Miguel Beer, and "Parachute" (1977) for Johnson Wax Paste. In 1988, Urbano directed the San Miguel Beer commercial featuring Fernando Poe Jr. on horseback. Urbano also created commercials for other prominent brands such as Coca-Cola, Pepsi, Safeguard and Tide. At the same time, he worked with comedians such as Bert Marcelo, the cast of Bad Bananas, Subas Herrero, Noel Trinidad, and Rico J. Puno.

== Mr. Shooli ==
In his 50s, Urbano began portraying a satirical character named Mr. Shooli, who was dressed in a bright red Mongol regal costume and sported a fu manchu moustache while speaking in a Chinese accent and was known for his comedic takes on Philippine politics and pop culture. This in turn spawned the popular weekly 1980s show Mongolian Barbecue initially broadcast on IBC-13, which won three consecutive Catholic Mass Media Awards and underwent a revival by Golden Nation Network in 2014. The series also spawned several film adaptations and cameos, including a 1991 movie titled Juan Tamad at Mister Shooli: Mongolian Barbecue, which Urbano also directed and wrote, and which also won six awards in that year's Metro Manila Film Festival.

In an interview, Urbano denied that his character was derived from Genghis Khan, which was incidentally the subject of an eponymous 1950 biopic directed by his father, and said that he created Mr. Shooli based on his imitations of Chinese accents by his friends in school and decided to officially describe his character as Mongolian to avoid offending the Chinese Filipino community and after finding that Mongolia had no embassy in the Philippines. His character was initially called Mr. Mongolian until 1985, when during a guesting on Edu Manzano's talk show Not So Late Night With Edu, he was asked by Manzano if he had a formal name, upon which his reply "Surely, surely" was misheard by Manzano to be Shooli.

In his later years, Urbano also hosted programs on YouTube that invited Filipino politicians to engage in discourse with his Mr. Shooli persona. He also appeared as Mr. Shooli at his acceptance of the Gawad Plaridel award from the University of the Philippines, which recognized his character's social commentary and Urbano's work in multimedia commercial advertising, in 2023.

== Other works ==
Urbano also appeared in other television shows and films such as Peque Gallaga and Lore Reyes's 1996 fantasy film Magic Temple where he starred as Sifu, the 2009 film Litsonero, the 2010 romance film I Do, the 2011 comedy Hostage Ko… Multo, the horror series Midnight DJ and the action series Ang Probinsyano. He also appeared in an ABS-CBN documentary about the movie Ibong Adarna, which was directed by his father in 1941. His last screen appearance was in the 2020 movie Magikland.

Urbano also directed and wrote several films such as a 2014 adaptation of the epic poem Ibong Adarna, Vontes V and Ang M.O.N.A.Y. ni Mr. Shooli.

== Political involvement ==
Urbano supported the candidacy of Fernando Poe Jr. for the Philippine presidency in the 2004 election and directed Poe's television advertisements for his ultimately unsuccessful campaign.

== Personal life and death ==
Urbano was married to Victoria and had four sons.

He died from a ruptured abdominal aortic aneurysm on December 2, 2023, at the age of 84. He had previously undergone a quintuple heart bypass in 2012 and diagnosed in 2016 with chronic obstructive pulmonary disease but continued his entertainment career.

== Filmography ==
=== Film ===
==== As director/screenwriter ====
Year	Title	Director	Writer	Actor	Notes
1963	Si Juan Tamad at si Juan Masipag sa Pulitikang Walang Hanggan	No	Yes	No	
1966	Magnificent Brothers	No	Yes	No	
1973	7 Infantes de Lara	Yes	Yes	No	
1979	Vontes V	Yes	Yes	No	
1984	Hoy! Wala Kang Paki	Yes	No	No	Credited as Manuel Conde Jr.
1985	Isang Platitong Mani	Yes	No	No	
1991	Juan Tamad at Mister Shooli: Mongolian Barbecue	Yes	Yes	Yes	
1998	My Guardian Debil	Yes	Yes	No	
2007	Ang M.O.N.A.Y. ni Mr. Shooli (Misteyks Opda Neysion Adres Yata)	Yes	Yes	Yes	
2014	Ibong Adarna: The Pinoy Adventure	Yes	Yes	No	

==== As actor only ====
Year	Title	Role	Notes
1949	Prinsipe Paris		
1956	Krus Na Kawayan		
1992	Boy Anghel: Utak Pulburon	San Pedro	
1996	Magic Temple	Sifu	
1997	Magic Kingdom: Ang Alamat ng Damortis	Amain	
2009	Litsonero	Mang Carding	
2010	Miss You like Crazy	Temi	
2010	I Do	Angkong	
2013	Otso		
2013	ABCs of Death 2	Caloy	Segment "I Is for Invincible"
2016	Hiblang Abo		
2020	Magikland	Amain	

== Awards ==
Year	Award-giving body	Category	Work
2023	Filipino Academy of Movie Arts and Sciences	Dr. Jose R. Perez Memorial Award	
2023	University of the Philippines College of Mass Communication	Gawad Plaridel	
