= Gil Portes =

Filipino film director, film producer, screenwriter

- Born: Gil M. Portes; September 13, 1945; Manila, Commonwealth of the Philippines
- Died: May 24, 2017 (aged 71); Quezon City, Philippines
- Resting place: Pagbilao Public Cemetery Quezon, Philippines
- Education: University of Santo Tomas; Brooklyn College
- Occupations: film director, film producer, screenwriter

Gil M. Portes (September 13, 1945 – May 24, 2017) was a Filipino film director, film producer and screenwriter.

== Early life and education ==
Gil Portes took up his Journalism at the University of Santo Tomas, Manila, Philippines and received a master's degree in theater from Brooklyn College, Brooklyn, New York.

== Career ==
His drama film, Saranggola (1999), won various awards at the Metro Manila Film Festival, including Best Picture and Best Actor. It was also entered into the 21st Moscow International Film Festival.

His drama film, Small Voices (2002), is considered a masterpiece in Filipino cinema and won eleven awards and was nominated for eleven other awards including the Gawad Urian Awards.

In 2002, Portes was in the middle of directing a film about the Balangiga massacre titled Balangiga 1901, intending it as an entry for the Metro Manila Film Festival, when production was suddenly halted in September; the film was eventually left unfinished.

== Death ==
Portes died on May 24, 2017, at the age of 71.

== Filmography ==
=== Director ===
Year	Title
1976	Tiket Mama, Tiket Ale
1977	Sa Piling ng Mga Sugapa
1978	Kukulog, Kikidlat Sa Tanghaling Tapat
1979	Pabonggahan
1980	Miss X
1980	Wanted! Wives
1981	High School Scandal
1981	Carnival Queen
1982	Pusong Uhaw
1983	Iiyak Ka Rin
1983	Gabi Kung Sumikat ang Araw
1983	Never Say Goodbye
1984	'Merika
1984	Bukas, May Pangarap
1988	Birds of Prey
1990	Andrea, Paano Ba ang Maging Isang Ina?
1991	Class of '91
1993	Kailan Dalawa ang Mahal?
1995	Minsan May Pangarap: The Guce Family Story
1996	Mulanay: Sa Pusod ng Paraiso
1997	Puerto Princesa
1998	Miguel/Michelle
1999	Saranggola
2000	Markova: Comfort Gay
2001	I.D.
2001	In the Bosom of the Enemy
2001	Huwag Kang Kikibo
2002	Small Voices
2003	Homecoming
2004	Beautiful Life
2005	Matthew, Mark, Luke and John
2006	The Mourning Girls
2006	Barcelona
2009	Pitik Bulag
2010	Two Funerals
2013	Bayang Magiliw
2013	Liars
2013	Ang Tag-Araw ni Twinkle
2014	Hukluban
2016	Ang Hapis at Himagsik ni Hermano Puli
2017	Moonlight Over Baler

== Awards ==
Year	Award-Giving Body	Category	Work	Result
1990	Metro Manila Film Festival	Best Director	Andrea, Paano Ba ang Maging Isang Ina?	Won
1990	Metro Manila Film Festival	Best Original Story (with Ricky Lee)	Andrea, Paano Ba ang Maging Isang Ina?	Won
1990	Metro Manila Film Festival	Best Screenplay (with Ricky Lee)	Andrea, Paano Ba ang Maging Isang Ina?	Won
