= Patrick Garcia =

Filipino actor (born 1981)

- Born: Franz Patrick Velasco Garcia; September 14, 1981 (age 45); Makati, Metro Manila, Philippines
- Occupation: Actor
- Years active: 1992–2018; 2023–present
- Agents: Star Magic (1996–2006; 2011–2018; 2023–present) GMA Artist Center (2006–2011); RSB Unit (now RGE Drama Unit and RSB Scripted Format) (2013–2018)
- Spouse: Nikka Martinez (m. 2015)
- Children: 5
- Relatives: Cheska Garcia (sister); Cristina Garcia (cousin); Sharmaine Arnaiz (maternal cousin); Doug Kramer (brother-in-law)

Franz Patrick Velasco Garcia (Tagalog pronunciation: [gaɾˈsɪa]; born September 14, 1981), is a Filipino actor and model.

== Early life ==
Garcia was born to parents are Francisco Pablo Pellicer García and María Celeste Dahlia Villalobos Velasco. He served as an altar boy at Saint James the Great Parish Church in Ayala Alabang from the age of nine until he moved with his family to the San Francisco del Monte district of Quezon City.

== Career ==
At the age of 13, his older actress sister Cheska convinced him to try acting. He auditioned for the 1994 film Separada, and was cast immediately. The movie was well received by the critics and became an instant hit, cementing Garcia's status as the newest young heartthrob in the Philippines.

A year later, Garcia landed many more roles in movies and soap operas, such as Gimik, Araw-araw, gabi-gabi, Asero, among others. Then in 1996, he received the Best Child Actor award at the FAMAS Awards, for his role as Ryan in the critically acclaimed Olivia M. Lamasan film, Madrasta. The following year (1997), Garcia received multiple awards in the movie Batang PX.

After Madrasta, Garcia has been working steadily ever since, taking on more challenging character roles in movies, Mano Po III: My Love, Nagbibinata and television series Captain Barbell and Super Twins.

Garcia was one of the original cast of Ang TV. He was later relaunched as a member of Star Circle (now Star Magic) Batch 2 in ABS-CBN. He is the younger brother of another Ang TV cast and Star Circle Batch 3 member, Cheska Garcia and commercial model Pichon Garcia.

Garcia first began his career in ABS-CBN and then transferred to rival network GMA Network. While he was with ABS-CBN, he was paired with actresses Anna Larrucea, Paula Peralejo and Jodi Sta. Maria, the latter (Sta. Maria) of whom he got to work with in more notable projects such as Tabing Ilog (also with Peralejo), Pangako Sa 'Yo, Darating ang Umaga and lastly Kampanerang Kuba. He was also seen on Babangon Ako't Dudurugin Kita and Obra.

In 2009, Garcia starred in the remake of Kung Aagawin Mo ang Lahat sa Akin starring Maxene Magalona and Glaiza de Castro. Then in November 2009, he returned via Full House as Luigi on GMA Network.

After his role in Iglot on GMA Network, Garcia returned to ABS-CBN.

== Personal life ==
Garcia previously dated actress Jennylyn Mercado, together they have a son, Alex Jazz Mercado, born on August 16, 2008. In June 2008, Garcia left for New York "to pursue studies in directing at New York University" but nothing came of his plans to go to film school. On October 9, 2008, Garcia returned to the Philippines for the wedding of his sister Cheska Garcia and basketball player Doug Kramer.

Garcia married Nikka Martinez in March 2015. The couple has one son and three daughters: Michelle Celeste “Chelsea” (born 2012), Nicola Patrice (born 2016), Francisca Pia (born 2017) and Enrique Pablo (born 2021).

== Filmography ==
=== Film ===
Year	Title	Role	Notes	Source
1994	Separada	Vincent		
1995	Asero	Victor Asero		
1995	Araw-araw, Gabi-gabi	Jun–Jun		
1995	Rollerboys	Christian		
1996	Madrasta	Ryan		
1997	Ang TV Movie: The Adarna Adventure	Patrick		
1997	Biyudo Si Daddy, Biyuda Si Mommy			
1997	Batang PX	Christopher 'Am-boy' Dahoff		
1998	Nagbibinata	Lester Carmona		
1999	Mula Sa Puso: The Movie	Warren		
1999	Oo Na, Mahal Na Kung Mahal	Patrick		
2000	Sugatang Puso	Eric		
2002	Jologs	Dino		
2003	Noon at Ngayon: Pagsasamang Kay Ganda	Mike		
2004	Mano Po III: My Love	Stephen		
2007	Angels	Jude	Segment: "Angel of Love"	
2012	ÜnOfficially Yours	Vince Villegas		
2015	The Comeback			
2016	Love Me Tomorrow			
2024	A Journey	Kristoff/Tupe		
2025	ConMom	Oyet		

=== Television ===
Year	Title	Role	Notes	Source
1992–1997	Ang TV	Himself		
1995–2006	ASAP	Himself - Host / Performer		
1995–1996	Familia Zaragoza			
1996–1998	Gimik	Carlo De Leon		
1997–1999	Mula sa Puso	Warren		
1997	Maalaala Mo Kaya		Episode: "Gitara"	
1997	Wansapanataym	Prince Patrick	Episode: "Prinsipe Patrick"	
1998	Maalaala Mo Kaya		Episode: "Egg Cell/Obaryo"	
1998	Wansapanataym		Episode: "Slow Down, Angels Crossing"	
1998–2001	Richard Loves Lucy	Mikoy		
1999–2002	Tabing Ilog	Jaime 'James' Collantes		
2000–2002	Pangako Sa 'Yo	Jonathan		
2003	Darating ang Umaga	Nathaniel Cordero		
2004	Mangarap Ka	Tristan		
2005	Kampanerang Kuba	Luke Tennyson		
2006	Komiks Presents: Momay	Andro		
2006	Komiks Presents: Bampy	Cameo appearance		
2006–2007	Captain Barbell	Levi Villain		
2007	Fantastic Man	Lloyd Mendez		
2007	Super Twins	Billy		
2007	Mga Kuwento Ni Lola Basyang	Prinsipe Jorge		
2008	Babangon Ako't Dudurugin Kita	Lawrence Fajardo		
2009	Obra	Guest Role		
2009	Dear Friend	Guest Role		
2009	Sine Novela: Kung Aagawin Mo ang Lahat sa Akin	Arvin Samaniego		
2009	Full House	Luigi Mondragon		
2011	Iglot	Aldo		
2012	Precious Hearts Romances Presents: Lumayo Ka Man Sa Akin	Matthew De Vega		
2012	Maalaala Mo Kaya	Ramon	Episode: "Apoy"	
2013	Apoy sa Dagat	Alberto Del Sol		
2013–2014	Annaliza	Lazaro "Laz" Benedicto		
2014–2015	Two Wives	Albert Medrano		
2015	Maalaala Mo Kaya	Macky	Episode: "Sinigang"	
2015	Ipaglaban Mo!	Gary	Episode: "May Hangganan Ang Lahat"	
2015	Ipaglaban Mo!	Bert	Episode: "Ganti ng Sawi"	
2016	All of Me	Young Vicente Avila		
2016	Maalaala Mo Kaya	Edmund	Episode: "Police Uniform"	
2016	Ipaglaban Mo	Mark	Episode: "Kapitbahay"	
2016–2017	Langit Lupa	Christian "Ian" Chavez		
2017	Wildflower	Young Julio Ardiente (season 3)		
2018	Sana Dalawa ang Puso	Young Juancho Laureano		
2018	The Blood Sisters	Emman Suarez		
2018	Playhouse	Brad Cortes		

== Awards and nominations ==
- Movie Actor of the Year 14th Star Awards for Movies Batang PX
- Best Performer Young Critics Circle Awards Batang PX
- Best Actor Nominee FAP Awards Batang PX
- Best Actor Nominee Urian Awards Batang PX
- Teenage Actor of the Year Guillermo Mendoza Memorial Awards
- Best Young Performer Parangal ng Bayan Awards
- German Moreno Youth Achievers Awardee 46th Annual FAMAS Awards
- Favorite Actor of the Year People's Choice Awards Batang PX
- Best Child Actor FAMAS Awards
- Best Supporting Actor Nominee Urian Awards
