= Yamashita: The Tiger's Treasure =

2001 film by Chito S. Roño

- The original DVD cover
- Directed by: Chito S. Roño
- Written by: Roy Iglesias
- Produced by: Douglas Quijano; Sherida Monteverde; Allan Escaño
- Starring: Armando Goyena; Danilo Barrios; Albert Martinez; Vic Diaz; Rustom Padilla; Camille Prats
- Cinematography: Neil Daza
- Edited by: Manet Dayrit
- Music by: Nathan Brendholdt; Kormann Roque
- Production companies: MAQ Productions; RoadRunner Network
- Distributed by: Regal Films
- Release date: December 25, 2001; (MMFF)
- Running time: 112 minutes
- Country: Philippines
- Languages: Filipino; English; Japanese
- Budget: ₱80 million (estimated)

Yamashita: The Tiger's Treasure is a 2001 Filipino action-adventure-drama film directed by Chito S. Roño and starring Armando Goyena, Danilo Barrios, Albert Martinez, Vic Diaz, Rustom Padilla, and Camille Prats. Its plot revolves around a hidden Yamashita treasure. It was released by Regal Films. The film won a total of 11 awards in various award-giving bodies including the coveted Best Picture in the 2001 Metro Manila Film Festival.

== Plot ==
The Rosales family are a wealthy Filipino American family living in an upscale neighborhood in San Francisco. Jobert Rosales is the grandson of Carmelo "Melo" Rosales, an elderly Filipino World War II veteran living in the United States who tells his war stories to his grandson Jobert. In one flashback, he tells the story of his participation during World War II, when his unit was ordered to bury the Yamashita Treasure.

One day, Jobert returns home to find his parents murdered and his grandfather missing. After the funeral, Jobert decides to go back to the Philippines and on the flight, he finds the clues to a hidden treasure in his grandfather's coded, wartime journal, which serves as a key to the location of the treasure and becomes engrossed with it. During his trip, news of his parents' murder and grandfather's disappearance spread around the globe. However, upon arrival in Manila, Jobert is unaware that he has become the center of attention, especially when a journalist gives him a business card at Ninoy Aquino International Airport. His nervousness increases after an uncomfortable interrogation with police general Rivas.

Jobert happily reunites with his old friends and former classmates but the reunion turns sour when they are ambushed and abducted by mercenaries, who take them to Edmundo "Emong" Mariano. As Emong reveals his innocence and his concern for Melo's safety, a man named Nolasco and his troops arrive and reveal that the said "abduction" was a preventive operation to protect Jobert and his friends from being captured by corrupt members of the Presidential Anti-Organized Crime Task Force (PAOCTF), who form part of an unknown criminal syndicate, headed by Naguchi a Japanese World War II veteran and his underboss Jarco. To the friends' horror, Nolasco states that the syndicate is interested with the treasure, and masterminded Melo's kidnapping, intent on killing him, as well as Jobert and his friends after they find the said loot, before he reveals himself and Emong to be top Philippine government officials with the latter serving as the country's Yamashita treasure expert. When Nolasco adds that they know how to find Melo and save him, an ambush occurs, wherein Emong leads the team's escape. After a highway chase with the syndicate's henchmen, the team boards a small yacht that will take them to an inter-island ship, which will serve as their safehouse.

While on the ship, Jobert reads the journal. Flashbacks of Lolo Melo's life show his happy life with his younger brother, Peping, whom he gave an expensive harmonica as a gift before he enlists in the Army. Upon the outbreak of World War II, Melo and Peping were captured by the Imperial Japanese Army. While they were tortured by Japanese troops, he and Peping console themselves to relieve their sorrow by listening to the latter's harmonica music. That goes on until General Tomoyuki Yamashita orders them and some POWs to be herded in a transport ship bound to Mindoro. They suffered severe maltreatment, from rotational torture, feeding them with meager rations, from spoiled rice to boiled camote roots and among others. The journal, revealed as the treasure map in pieces, confirms Mindoro as the site.

Meanwhile, one of Jobert's friends suspects something about Emong's identity and intentions. Another flashback reveals of Melo's war life. In Mindoro, the POW's are forced to dig several large tunnels to bury something. The ship, carrying Yamashita's loot, arrives in Mindoro and the POW's were ordered to place the treasures in the tunnels and place some traps, including land mines. Melo and several others are forced to seal the area afterwards. An American air raid buries his younger brother and some of their fellow prisoners alive. Peping plays the harmonica one last time, as his co-prisoners die due to suffocation while he dies of his wounds.

Upon arrival at Mindoro, the team are met by Jarco and his henchmen. Jobert reunites with Melo, captured by the syndicate's team as asset, bargaining chip and guide, along with multiple trucks to transport the loot. Melo and Jobert leads Jarco and the henchmen into the tunnels, seemingly full of gold, loot and the legendary Golden Buddha. Melo tells Jobert to leave the tunnel as he confronts the henchman. As Jobert's group leaves, Jarco's henchmen try to kill them but a distraction in the form of a military backup following Naguchi's moves arrives and disposes the henchmen. The group are eventually rescued by Emong, who is revealed to have called the military for help.

Back at the tunnels, Melo discovers his younger brother's skeletal remains, along with the rusting harmonica he gave many decades ago. Jarco, seemingly mesmerized by countless loot in his front, opens the Golden Buddha only to step on a land mine, causing a chain of explosions that destroys the tunnel, killing everyone including himself. Before Melo dies, he plays the harmonica one last time, while Peping's spirit smiles in front of him and embraces him.

Emong and Jobert's group leads the military to the location of the tunnels only to arrive too late after the explosion. Realizing that some of Naguchi's surviving henchmen are leaving with the loot and treasure loaded in trucks, Jobert tells Emong to call the press about the incident. The resulting media frenzy causes residents and authorities to erect blockades and create human chains to halt the convoy; the blockade succeeds and the henchmen are arrested. Naguchi and Rivas, now revealed to be his accomplice and the mastermind behind the incidents, are also taken to custody. After a flashback shows Yamashita's execution by hanging, Melo and Peping's remains, as well as those of other POWs are exhumed and buried with full honors in Libingan ng mga Bayani.

An epilogue reveals that Philippine government uses the treasure to pay all its debts and indemnity for veterans and other war victims. Melo and Peping are posthumously awarded the Philippine Medal of Valor, and EDSA is renamed Carmelo Rosales Avenue due to his honor, heroism and resilience.

== Cast ==
=== Main roles ===
- Armando Goyena as Carmelo Rosales, also known as Lolo Melo
  - Carlo Muñoz as the young Carmelo
- Danilo Barrios as Jobert Rosales, Lolo Melo's grandson
- Albert Martinez as Emong, a Philippine Government Official
- Vic Diaz as the old World War II Japanese veteran Naguchi
  - Tetsuya Matsui as the young Naguchi
- Rustom Padilla as Jarco, Naguchi's right-hand
- Camille Prats as Xyra, the love interest of Jobert
- Tadakazu Sakuma as General Yamashita

=== Supporting roles ===
- Janus Del Prado as Omar
- Bearwin Meily as Elmore
- Mico Palanca as Vince
- Ethan Javier as Willie
- Leni Rivera as Glecy Castro
- Johnny Revilla as Orly
- Bambi Arambulo as Laila
- Marvin Lanuza as Phil
- Heidi Reyes as Pam
- Gail Valencia as Connie
- Pocholo Montes as Gen. Rivas
- Fonz Deza as Velasco/Nolasco
- Reggie Curley as Bello
- Niño Benedicto as Peping, Carmelo's younger brother
- Troy Martino as Xyra's dad
- Mia Gutierrez as Xyra's mom
- Hernando San Pedro as old Delfin
- Jez Umila as young Delfin
- Victor Hall as Sgt. Santoro

== Production ==
The film was shot in United States and Philippines. Roadrunner Network, Inc. is responsible for the majority of visual effects. The titles were made by Cinemagic. The films were printed by LVN Pictures.

== Soundtrack ==
The original film score was composed and conducted by Nathan Brendholdt and Kormann Roque. It was recorded at The Music and Sound Gallery. The sound mixing was done at The Elemantal Music.

"The Treasure In You" is the theme song of the film, composed by Elvin Reyes and Normann Roque and arranged by Ruth Bagalay. It was recorded by singer Pops Fernandez.

== Release ==
=== Reception ===
On the review aggregator Rotten Tomatoes it has an approval rating of 57% and an average score of 3.5 out of 5 from users based on 80 reviews.

=== Home media ===
The official home video of the film was released on November 15, 2005, in Region-3 DVD format.

== Accolades ==
=== 2001 Metro Manila Film Festival ===
- Won best picture
- Won best director for Chito S. Roño

=== 2001 FAMAS Awards ===
- Won best actor for Armando Goyena
- Won best art Direction for Max Paglingawan and Fernan Santiago
- Won best special Effects for Roadrunner Network, Inc.
- Won best supporting Actor for Carlo Muñoz.
- Won best visual Effects for Roadrunner Network, Inc.

=== Young Critics Circle, Philippines ===
- Won best cinematography for Neil Daza
- Won best visual Design for Max Paglingawan and Fernan Santiago
- Won best achievement in Sound for Ross Diaz, Ronald de Asis and Albert Michael Idioma
- Won best achievement in Aural Orchestration for Kormann Roque and Nathan Brendholdt

== Controversies ==
=== MMFF ===
When the film won the Best Picture award over the much favored film Bagong Buwan (a film about the military conflict in Muslim Mindanao directed by Marilou Diaz-Abaya), many moviegoers and critics were shocked over its selection for the top award as the movie was presented as an adventure film tackling the legend about the lost gold of Yamashita in the Philippines. For the most part, Yamashita was a fantasy and its subject matter was considered irrelevant to Filipinos.

=== Pearl Harbor ===
Prior to its release, Yamashita rode a wave of hype as the Philippines' answer to Michael Bay's Pearl Harbor due to a scene on the film featuring Japanese fighter planes attacking a Philippine base which gratefully aped a scene in Pearl Harbor. The scene was made using the most advanced visual effects technology available at that time.
