= Chito S. Roño =

Filipino writer, producer, and director (born 1954)

- Born: Chito Sarmiento Roño; April 26, 1954 (age 72); Calbayog, Samar, Philippines
- Other name: Sixto Kayko
- Occupations: Writer; producer; director; talent manager; businessman
- Years active: 1986–present
- Parent: Jose Roño (father)

Chito Sarmiento Roño (Tagalog pronunciation: [ˈɾɔɲo]; born April 26, 1954), also known as Sixto Kayko and Chito S. Roño, is a Filipino writer, producer, director, and businessman. He came to prominence in the Philippine film industry as a director with films like Private Show (1986), and Itanong Mo sa Buwan (The Moonchild; 1988) with the latter earning accolades from the Gawad Urian Awards. He also won the Metro Manila Film Festival Award for Best Director for the films Nasaan ang Puso (Where is the Heart; 1997), and Yamashita: The Tiger's Treasure (2001).

In 1983, Roño established the animation studio Optifex International, which provided contract work for several Hanna-Barbera television series before closing in 1989. In the 1990s, he was instrumental in the formation of the Pinoy rock band Rivermaya as well as the dance group Streetboys. He also directed the family drama Signal Rock (2018) which was the Philippines' entry to the Best Foreign Language Film category at the 91st Academy Awards.

He also directed television shows like Spirits (2004), Magkano ang Iyong Dangal? (How Much Is Your Dignity?; 2010), Imortal (2010), and Maria Mercedes (2013). He is also Vhong Navarro's manager.

== Early life ==
Chito Sarmiento Roño was born on April 26, 1954, in Calbayog, Samar, in the Philippines to Jose Alvarez Roño (1923–2002), a politician who later became governor of Samar and Secretary of the Interior and Local Government, and Carol Dominado Sarmiento. He is the eldest among six siblings. He is an alumnus of the University of the Philippines College of Mass Communication. During his college days at the university, he was active in Dulaang UP with Tony Mabesa as an actor, stage manager, props man, and director. Chito Roño, with Lizza Nakpil, also founded Rivermaya and Streetboys in 1993, the latter of which included future actors Vhong Navarro and Jhong Hilario

He is also related to most of the Veloso Clan, a political family from Calbayog.

== Filmography ==
=== Film director ===
- Stella Magtanggol (1986)
- Private Show (1986)
- Olongapo: The Great American Dream (1987)
- Itanong Mo sa Buwan (1988)
- Baleleng at ang Gintong Sirena (1988)
- Kasalanan Bang Sambahin Ka? (1990)
- Bakit Kay Tagal ng Sandali? (1990)
- Kailan Ka Magiging Akin (1991)
- Narito ang Puso Ko (1992)
- Ikaw Lang (1993)
- Sige! Ihataw Mo! (1994)
- Separada (1994)
- Minsan Lang Kita Iibigin (1994)
- Eskapo (1995)
- Patayin sa Sindak si Barbara (1995)
- Di Mapigil ang Init (1995)
- Dahas (1995)
- Nasaan ang Puso (1997)
- Curacha, ang Babaing Walang Pahinga (1998)
- Bata, Bata... Pa'no Ka Ginawa? (1998)
- Ang Babae sa Bintana (1998)
- Hinahanap-hanap kita (1999)
- Laro sa Baga (2000)
- Spirit Warriors (2000)
- La Vida Rosa (2001)
- Yamashita: The Tiger's Treasure (2001)
- Dekada '70 (2002)
- Spirit Warriors: The Shortcut (2003)
- Feng Shui (2004)
- Sukob (2006)
- Caregiver (2008)
- T2 (2009)
- Emir (2010)
- Bulong (2011)
- The Healing (2012)
- Shake, Rattle and Roll Fourteen: The Invasion (2012)
- Badil (2013)
- Boy Golden: Shoot to Kill (2013)
- The Trial (2014)
- Feng Shui 2 (2014)
- Etiquette for Mistresses (2015)
- The Ghost Bride (2017)
- Signal Rock (2018)
- Ang mga Kaibigan ni Mama Susan (2023)
- Espantaho (2024)

=== Television director ===
Year	Title	Network
1997	Wansapanataym (Episode: "Kapirasong Langit")	ABS-CBN
2004	Spirits	ABS-CBN
2007	Mars Ravelo's Lastikman	ABS-CBN
2010	Magkano ang Iyong Dangal?	ABS-CBN
2010	Imortal	ABS-CBN
2013	Maria Mercedes	ABS-CBN
2022	Mars Ravelo's Darna	Kapamilya Channel

=== Writer ===
- Si Baleleng at ang Gintong Sirena (1988)
- Istokwa (1996)
- Curacha ang Babaeng Walang Pahinga (1998)
- Spirit Warriors (2000)
- Spirit Warriors: The Shortcut (2003)
- Feng Shui (2004)
- Sukob (2006)
- Caregiver (2008)
- T2 (2009)
- Emir (2010)
- Bulong (2011)

=== Film producer ===
- Hula (2011)

=== Film editor ===
- Itanong Mo sa Buwan (1988)

== Awards ==
Year	Award-Giving Body	Category	Work	Result
1997	Metro Manila Film Festival	Best Director	Nasaan ang Puso?	Won
2001	Metro Manila Film Festival	Best Director	Yamashita: The Tiger's Treasure	Won
2001	Metro Manila Film Festival	Best Original Story (with Roselle Monteverde-Teo and Roy Iglesias)	Yamashita: The Tiger's Treasure	Won
2001	Metro Manila Film Festival	Best Screenplay (with Roy Iglesias)	Yamashita: The Tiger's Treasure	Won
