= Anna Larrucea =

Spanish-Filipino actress (born 1984)

Anna Rebecca Larrucea
- Born: Anna Rebecca Larrucea; October 7, 1984 (age 40); Zamboanga City, Philippines
- Occupation: Actress
- Years active: 1992–2007
- Height: 5 ft 6 in (1.68 m)
- Spouse: Robert Pangilinan (m. 2013)
- Children: 1

Anna Rebecca Larrucea-Pangilinan (born October 7, 1984) is a former Filipino actress. Her father is of Basque origin and her mother is a Filipino.

== Career ==
She was launched as part of Star Circle Batch 4 and became a mainstay in ABS-CBN TV shows Ang TV (1992–1997), Kaybol (1995), Gimik (1996) and Mula sa Puso (1997).

She starred in the movie Baby Love (1995) with Jason Salcedo. She did movies such as Batang X (1995) with Aiko Melendez, Magic Temple (1996), Ang TV: The Movie (1996), Batang PX (1997) with Patrick Garcia, Mula sa Puso: The Movie (1999), Puso ng Pasko (1998), plus Sugatang Puso (2000) starring Lorna Tolentino and Christopher de Leon.

She was nominated for FAMAS Best Child Actress Award in Magic Temple (1996).

She appeared in GMA Network's TV series Hawak Ko ang Langit (2003) with Assunta de Rossi and Impostora (2007) starring Iza Calzado and Sunshine Dizon.

== Filmography ==
=== Television ===
Year	Title	Role	Notes	Source
1992–1997	Ang TV	Herself / Various roles		
1995–2003	ASAP	Herself / co-host / Performer		
1995	Maalaala Mo Kaya		Episode: "Alkansya"	
1996–1999	Kaybol: Ang Bagong TV	Herself / Various roles		
1996–1999	Gimik	Yanna Cortez		
1997	Maalaala Mo Kaya		Episode: "Kuna"	
1997–1998	Mula sa Puso	Nicole Matias		
1998	Maalaala Mo Kaya		Episode: "Shades"	
1998	Maalaala Mo Kaya		Episode: "Karne"	
1999–2001	Tabing Ilog	Gail		
2000	Maalaala Mo Kaya		Episode: "Mall"	
2001	Sa Dulo ng Walang Hanggan	Santina		
2003	Hawak Ko Ang Langit			
2003	Maalaala Mo Kaya		Episode: "Ilaw ng Poste"	
2004	30 Days	Herself - Contestant		
2005–2006	Ang Panday	Magnolia		
2007	Impostora	Cora		

=== Film ===
Year	Title	Role	Notes	Source
1995	Baby Love	Andie Palanca		
1995	Batang-X	3-Na / Trina De La Paz		
1996	Ang TV: The Movie	Kitana		
1996	Magic Temple	Yasmin		
1997	Biyudo Si Daddy, Biyuda Si Mommy	April		
1997	Batang PX	Angela		
1998	Puso ng Pasko	Sandy		
1999	Mula Sa Puso: The Movie	Nicole Matias		
2000	Sugatang Puso	Agnes		
2003	My First Romance	Rhoda	Segment: "Two Hearts"	
