= 28th PMPC Star Awards for Movies =

2011 Philippine Movie Press Club awards

28th Star Awards for Movies
- Date: March 14, 2012
- Hosted by: KC Concepcion; Derek Ramsay; Aga Muhlach; Anne Curtis
- Directed by: Al Quinn

Highlights
- Best Picture: Manila Kingpin: The Asiong Salonga Story

The 28th Star Awards for Movies by the Philippine Movie Press Club (PMPC), honored the best Filipino films of 2011. The ceremony took place on March 14, 2012, at the Meralco Theater in Ortigas, Pasig.

The PMPC Star Awards for Movies was hosted by KC Concepcion, Derek Ramsay, Aga Muhlach and Anne Curtis. Manila Kingpin: The Asiong Salonga Story bagged 8 awards including "Movie of the Year" while In The Name of Love won 5 awards. The event was televised at ABS-CBN's Sunday Best on March 18, 2012.

== Winners and nominees ==
The following are the nominations for the 28th PMPC Star Awards for Movies, covering films released in 2011.

Winners are listed first and indicated in bold.

=== Major categories ===
Movie of the Year	Digital Movie of the Year
Winner: **Manila Kingpin: The Asiong Salonga Story** (Viva Communication Inc., Scenema Concept Intíl.): Ang Panday 2 (Imus Productions, Inc., GMA Films); Aswang (Regal Entertainment, Inc.); In The Name Of Love (Star Cinema ABS-CBN Film Productions, Inc.); My Neighbor's Wife (Regal Entertainment, Inc); No Other Woman (Viva Films / Star Cinema ABS-CBN Film Productions); The Road (GMA Films)	Winner: **Thelma** (Time Horizon Pictures, Abracadabra Productions, Underground Logic): Ang Babae Sa Septic Tank (Cinemalaya Foundation, Martinez-Rivera Films, Quantum Films Production); Ang Sayaw ng Dalawang Kaliwang Paa (Cinemalaya Foundation, Vim Yapan, Alex Chua Productions, Bigtime Media Productions, SQ Films Laboratories, Inc., Optima Digita); Ikaw Ang Pag-ibig (Star Cinema, Archdiocese of Caceres, Marilou Diaz-Abaya Film Institute and Arts Center); Niño (Cinemalaya Foundation, Handurawan Films); Patikul (Cinemalaya Foundation, Xiti Productions, Sine Totoo Production); Sa Ilalim Ng Tulay (Cinema One Originals)
Movie Director of the Year	Digital Movie Director of the Year
Winner: **Daryl dela Cruz** (Manila Kingpin: The Asiong Salonga Story): Mac Alejandre (Ang Panday 2); Ruel S. Bayani (No Other Woman); Olivia M. Lamasan (In The Name of Love); Jun Lana (My Neighbor's Wife); Yam Laranas (The Road); Jerrold Tarog (Aswang)	Winner: **Paul Soriano** (Thelma): Marilou Diaz-Abaya (Ikaw Ang Pag-ibig); Loy Arcenas (Niño); Earl Bontuyan (Sa Ilalim Ng Tulay); Joel Lamangan (Patikul); Marlon Rivera (Ang Babae Sa Septic Tank); Alvin Yapan (Ang Sayaw Ng Dalawang Kaliwang Paa)
Movie Actor of the Year	Movie Actress of the Year
Winner: Tied between **ER Ejercito** (Manila Kingpin: the Asiong Salonga Story) and **Aga Muhlach** (In The Name of Love): Ryan Agoncillo (My Househusband); Dingdong Dantes (Segunda Mano); Martin Escudero (Zombadings 1: Patayin Sa Shokot Si Remington); Derek Ramsay (No Other Woman); Jericho Rosales (Yesterday, Today, Tomorrow)	Winner: **Angel Locsin** (In The Name of Love): Ai-Ai delas Alas (Enteng Ng Ina Mo); Anne Curtis (No Other Woman); Eugene Domingo (Ang Babae Sa Septic Tank); Lovi Poe (My Neighbor's Wife); Maja Salvador (Thelma); Judy Ann Santos (My Househusband)
Movie Supporting Actor of the Year	Movie Supporting Actress of the Year
Winner: Tied between **Jake Cuenca** (In The Name of Love) and **Baron Geisler** (Manila Kingpin: The Asiong Salonga Story): Art Acuña (Niño); Tirso Cruz III (Deadline); John Regala (Manila Kingpin: The Asiong Salonga Story); Phillip Salvador (Ang Panday 2); Dennis Trillo (Yesterday, Today, Tomorrow)	Winner: **Lovi Poe** (Yesterday, Today, Tomorrow): Tetchie Agbayani (Thelma); Shamaine Centenera-Buencamino (Niño); Julia Clarete (Bisperas); Eugene Domingo (My Househusband); Angelica Panganiban (Segunda Mano); Eliza Pineda (Thelma)
New Movie Actor of the Year	New Movie Actress of the Year
Winner: **Rocco Nacino** (Ang Sayaw ng Dalawang Kaliwang Paa): Albie Casiño (Aswang); Matteo Guidicelli (Catch Me ...I'm In Love); Elmo Magalona (Tween Academy: Class of 2012); Derrick Monasterio (Tween Academy: Class of 2012); Alden Richards (The Road)	Winner: **Solenn Heussaff** (Temptation Island): Bonivie Budao (Busong); Eula Caballero (Yesterday, Today, Tomorrow); Joyce Ching (Tween Academy: Class of 2012); Lexi Fernandez (Tween Academy: Class of 2012)
Movie Child Performer of the Year
Winner: **Jillian Ward** (Aswang): Christopher Canduli (Sa Ilalim Ng Tulay); Bugoy Cariño (Shake Rattle & Roll XIII, "Tamawo" episode); Zaijian Jaranilla (Pak! Pak! My Dr. Kwak!); Yogo Singh (Ikaw Ang Pag-ibig); Robert Villar (Ang Panday 2); Xyriel Manabat (Pak! Pak! My Dr. Kwak)

=== Technical categories ===
Movie Original Screenplay of the Year	Digital Movie Original Screenplay of the Year
Winner: **Olivia M. Lamasan & Enrico Santos** (In The Name of Love): Aloy Adlawan & Jerrold Tarog (Aswang); Kriz Gazmen (No Other Woman); Roy Iglesias (Manila Kingpin: The Asiong Salonga Story); RJ Nuevas (Ang Panday 2)	Winner: **Froilan Medina & Paul Soriano** (Thelma): Earl A. Bontuyan (Sa Ilalim Ng Tulay); Chris Martinez (Ang Babae Sa Septic Tank); Rody Vera (Niño); Alvin Yapan (Ang Sayaw ng Dalawang Kaliwang Paa)
Movie Cinematographer of the Year	Digital Movie Cinematographer of the Year
Winner: **Carlo Mendoza** (Praybeyt Benjamin): Hermann Claravall (In The Name of Love); Yam Laranas (Bulong); Charlie Peralta (No Other Woman); Toto Uy (Ang Panday 2)	Winner: **Odyssey Flores** (Thelma): Larry Manda (Ang Babae Sa Septic Tank); Louie Quirino (Busong); Mccoy Tarnate (Boundary); Arvin Viola (Ang Sayaw ng Dalawang Kaliwang Paa)
Movie Production Designer of the Year	Digital Movie Production Designer of the Year
Winner: **Fritz Silorio, Mona Soriano, & Ronaldo Cadapan** (Bulong): Michael Español (Shake Rattle & Roll XIII, "Rain, Rain, Go Away" episode); Leo Abaya (In The Name of Love); Richard Somes (Ang Panday 2); Erick Torralba (My Neighbor's Wife)	Winner: **Laida Lim** (Niño): Edgar Martin Littaua (Patikul); Norman Regalado (Ang Babae Sa Septic Tank); Aped Santos (Ang Sayaw ng Dalawang Kaliwang Paa); Nina Torres (Thelma)
Movie Editor of the Year	Digital Movie Editor of the Year
Winner: **Jason Canapay & Ryan Orduna** (Praybeyt Benjamin): Vito Cajili (No Other Woman); Aleks Castaneda (Aswang); Chrisel Galeno-Desuasido (Ang Panday 2); Marya Ignacio (In The Name of Love)	Winner: **Ike Veneracion** (Ang Babae Sa Septic Tank): Danny Añonuevo (Niño); Mai Dionisio (Ang Sayaw ng Dalawang Kaliwang Paa); Mark Victor and Fabienne Bucher (Thelma); John Anthony Wong (Deadline)
Movie Musical Scorer of the Year	Digital Movie Musical Scorer of the Year
Winner: **Jessie Lasaten** (Enteng Ng Ina Mo): Von de Guzman (In The Name of Love); Von de Guzman (Ang Panday 2); Jesse Lucas (My Neighbor's Wife); Raul Mitra (No Other Woman)	Winner: **Vincent de Jesus** (Ang Babae Sa Septic Tank): Archie Castillo (Thelma); Ronald de Asis, Jerome Velasco, & JC De Asis (Sa Ilalim Ng Tulay); Von de Guzman (Patikul); Christine Muco & Jema Pamintuan (Ang Sayaw ng Dalawang Kaliwang Paa)
Movie Sound Engineer of the Year	Digital Movie Sound Engineer of the Year
Winner: **Albert Michael Idioma** (In The Name of Love): Ditoy Aguila (No Other Woman); Aurel Bilbao (Segunda Mano); Lamberto Casas Jr. & Alex Tomboc (Aswang); Albert Michael Idioma (Manila Kingpin: The Asiong Salonga Story)	Winner: **Ditoy Aguila** (Patikul): Albert Michael Idioma & Addiss Tabong (Ang Babae Sa Septic Tank); Albert Michael Idioma & Addiss Tabong (Thelma); Raffy Magsaysay (Boundary); Arnold Reodica (Ang Sayaw ng Dalawang Kaliwang Paa)
Movie Original Theme Song of the Year	Digital Movie Original Theme Song of the Year
Winner: **"Hari ng Tondo"** (Manila Kingpin: The Asiong Salonga Story): "Tween Academy Anthem" (Tween Academy: Class of 2012); "Who's That Girl" (Who's That Girl)	Winner: **"Ikaw Ang Aking Pag-ibig"** (Ikaw Ang Pag-ibig): "Kinukumutan Ka Ng Aking Titig" (Ang Sayaw Ng Dalawang Kaliwang Paa); "Sabaw" (Ang Babae Sa Septic Tank); "Nowhere To Run" (Thelma); "Paghihintay" (Sa Ilalim Ng Tulay)

== Special awards ==
Darling of the Press

Winner: Atty. Persida Acosta

  - Ai-Ai delas Alas
  - Angel Locsin
  - Luis Manzano
  - Vicky Morales
  - Annabelle Rama
  - Daniel Razon
  - Bong Revilla

- Ulirang Artista Award - Eddie Gutierrez
- Ulirang Alagad ng Pelikula sa Likod ng Kamera - Marilou Diaz-Abaya
- Male Face of the Night - Derek Ramsay
- Female Face of the Night - Valerie Concepcion
- Male Star of The Night - Aga Muhlach
- Female Star of The Night - KC Concepcion
- Miss. Great Shape Personality - Angel Locsin
- Mr. Great Shape Personality - Derek Ramsay
- Male Star with Radiant Skin - ER Ejercito
- Female Star with Radiant Skin - Iwa Moto
