= Yesterday, Today, Tomorrow (2011 film) =

Filipino drama film directed by Jun Lana

- Directed by: Jun Lana
- Starring: Maricel Soriano; Gabby Concepcion; Jericho Rosales; Dennis Trillo; Paulo Avelino; Lovi Poe; Carla Abellana; Solenn Heussaff; Ronaldo Valdez; Agot Isidro; Eula Caballero
- Production company: Regal Entertainment
- Distributed by: Regal Entertainment
- Release date: December 25, 2011
- Country: Philippines
- Language: Filipino

Yesterday, Today, Tomorrow (Filipino: Kahapon, Ngayon, Bukas) is a 2011 Filipino drama film directed by Jun Lana. The film stars Maricel Soriano, Gabby Concepcion, Jericho Rosales, Dennis Trillo, Paulo Avelino, Lovi Poe, Carla Abellana, Solenn Heussaff, Ronaldo Valdez, Agot Isidro and Eula Caballero. It is an official entry for the 2011 Metro Manila Film Festival. It was released on 25 December 2011.

== Plot ==
A story of people and the secrets that tear them apart. It follows a surprising decision that family members make in the aftermath of a tragedy and life changing decisions that will either lead them to a future full of lasting happiness or despair.

== Cast ==
=== Main cast ===
- Maricel Soriano as Mariel
- Gabby Concepcion as Gary
- Jericho Rosales as Jacob
- Dennis Trillo as Derek
- Paulo Avelino as Vincent
- Lovi Poe as Lori
- Carla Abellana as Charlotte
- Solenn Heussaff as Selene
- Ronaldo Valdez† as Donald
- Agot Isidro as Agnes
- Eula Caballero as Eunice

=== Supporting cast ===
- Chariz Solomon as Coreen
- Wilma Doesnt as Betty
- Via Antonio as Portia
- Nadine Samonte as TV Soap Actress
- Joem Bascon as TV Soap Actor
- Tim Yap as Event Host
- Yayo Aguila as Woman Flirting Derek
- Lui Villaruz as News Anchor
- Hermes Bautista as Vincent's friend
- Manuel Chua as Vincent's friend
- Carmen del Rosario as Maid

== Awards ==
Year	Award giving body	Award	Recipient	Result
2011	Metro Manila Film Festival	Best Actress	Maricel Soriano	Won
2011	Metro Manila Film Festival	Best Actor	Jericho Rosales	Nominated
2011	Metro Manila Film Festival	Best Supporting Actress	Solenn Heussaff	Nominated

== Release ==
=== Box office ===
The film grossed over ₱10.1 million on its 2 weeks of showing, and holds the second to the last grossing film out of eight other films including Enteng Ng Ina Mo, Ang Panday 2, Segunda Mano, and others who also competed in the 2011 Metro Manila Film Festival. And as of now, the film earned P18.8 million and still at its place.
