= Metro Manila Film Festival Award for Best Actor =

Award presented annually by the Metropolitan Manila Development Authority (MMDA)

- Awarded for: Best Performance by an Actor in a Leading Role
- Country: Philippines
- Presented by: MMDA
- First award: 1975
- Currently held by: Vice Ganda, Call Me Mother (2025)
- Website: www.mmda.gov.ph/mmff/

The Metro Manila Film Festival Award for Best Actor is an award presented annually by the Metropolitan Manila Development Authority (MMDA). It was first awarded at the 1st Metro Manila Film Festival ceremony, held in 1975; Joseph Estrada received the award for his role in Diligan Mo ng Hamog ang Uhaw na Lupa and it is given in honor of an actor who has delivered an outstanding performance in a leading role while working within the film industry. Currently, nominees and winners are determined by Executive Committees, headed by the Metropolitan Manila Development Authority Chairman and key members of the film industry.

== Winners and nominees ==
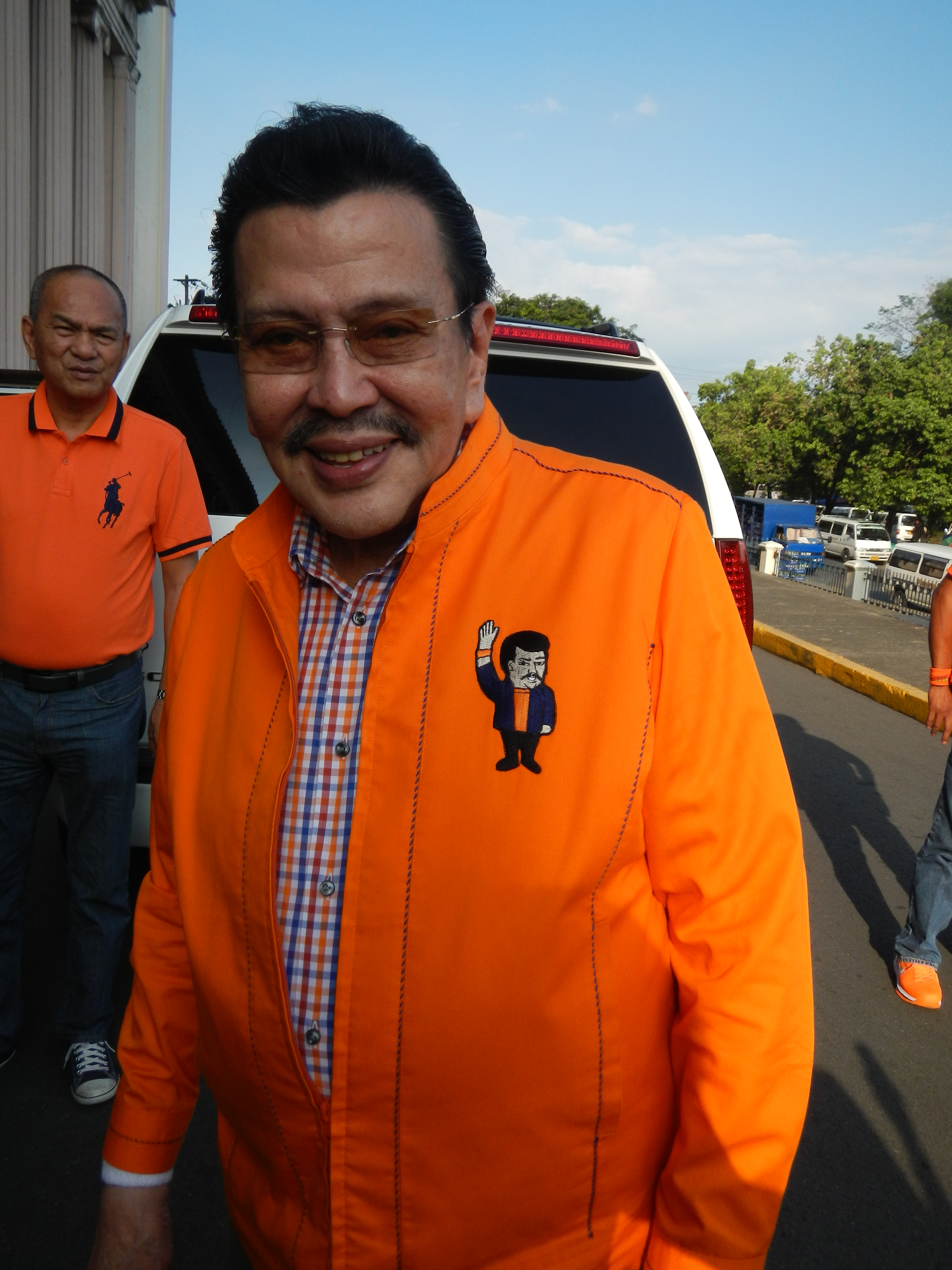
Joseph Estrada was the first winner in this category for his role in Diligan Mo ng Hamog ang Uhaw na Lupa.

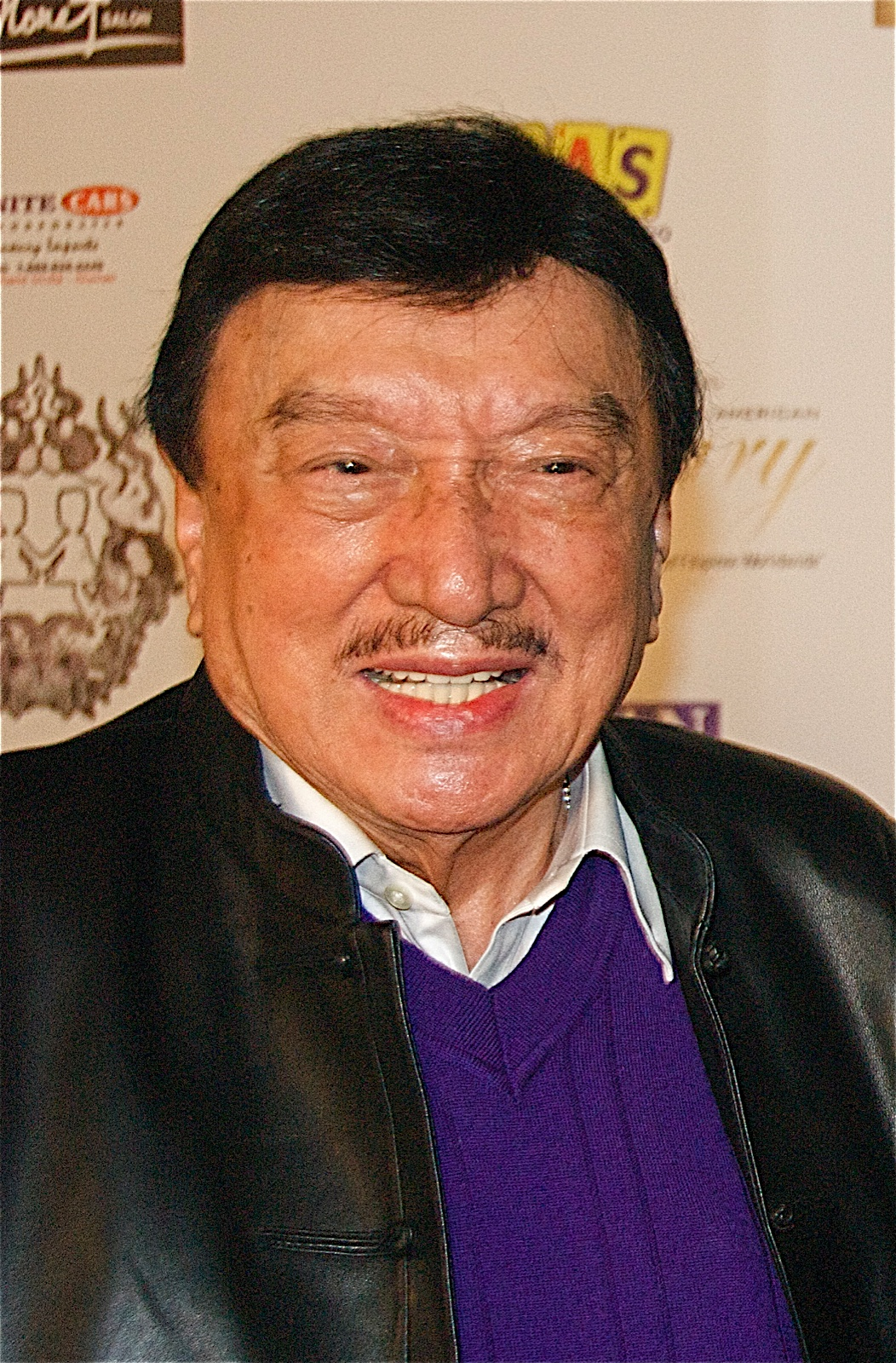
Dolphy won in 1990 for his role in Espadang Patpat, and another in Father Jejemon in 2010.

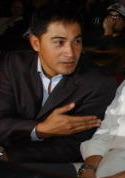
Cesar Montano won several "Best Actor" Awards including his first win in 1998 for his performance in José Rizal.

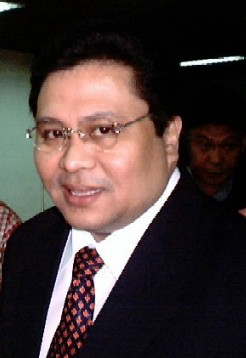
Jinggoy Estrada won in 2007 for his role in Katas ng Saudi.

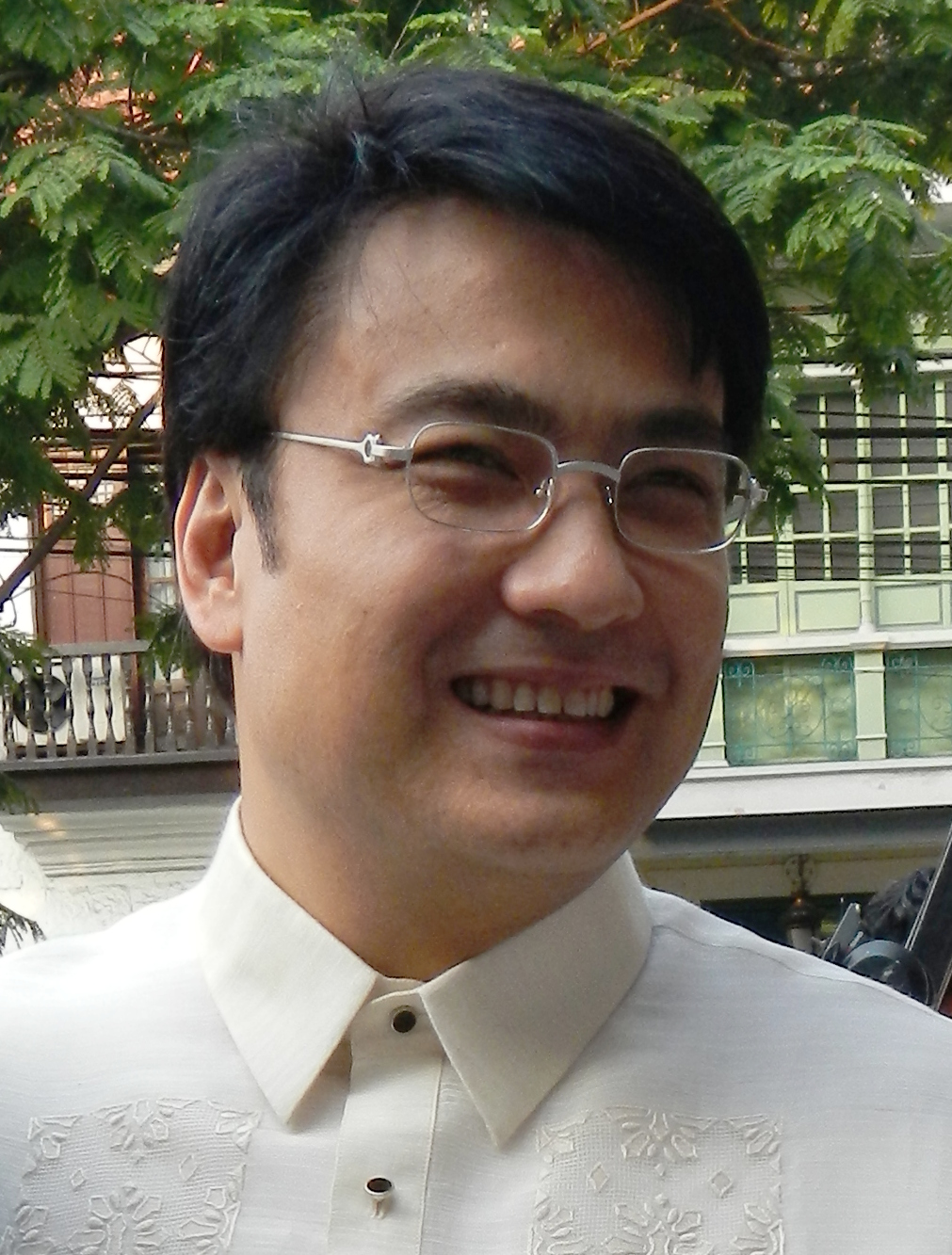
Ramon Bong Revilla won in 2009 for his acting in Ang Panday.

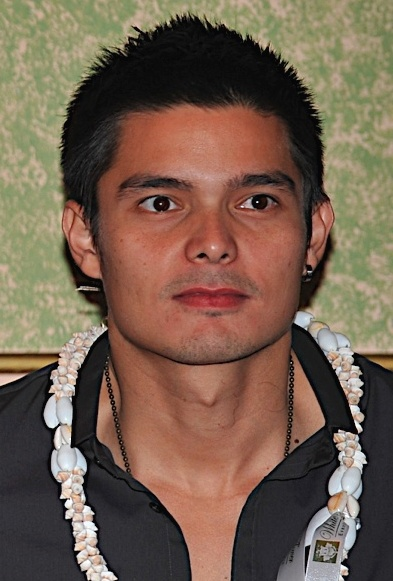
Dingdong Dantes won for 2 consecutive years starting in 2011 for his roles in Segunda Mano and One More Try respectively.

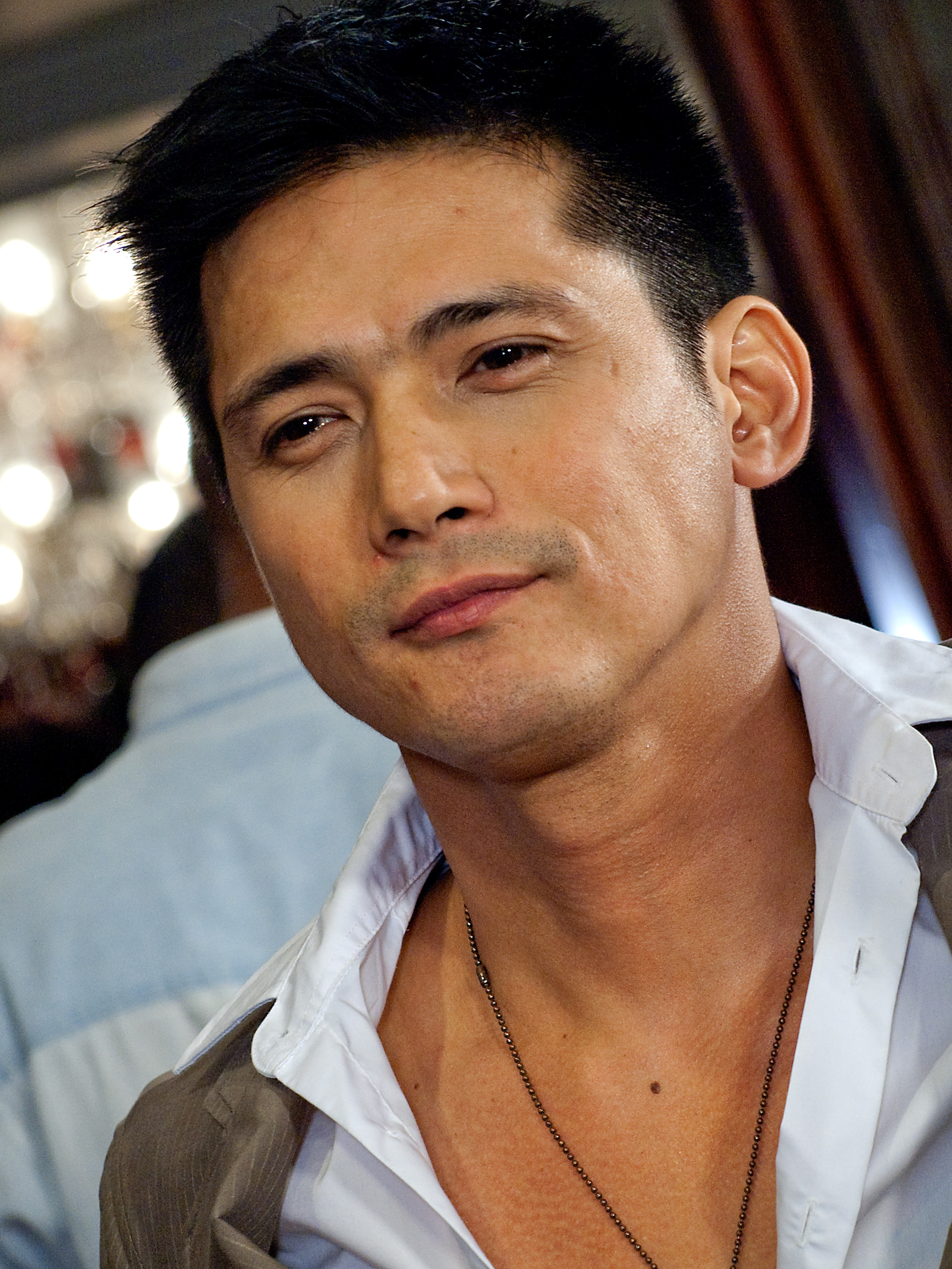
Robin Padilla won in 2013 for his role in 10,000 Hours.

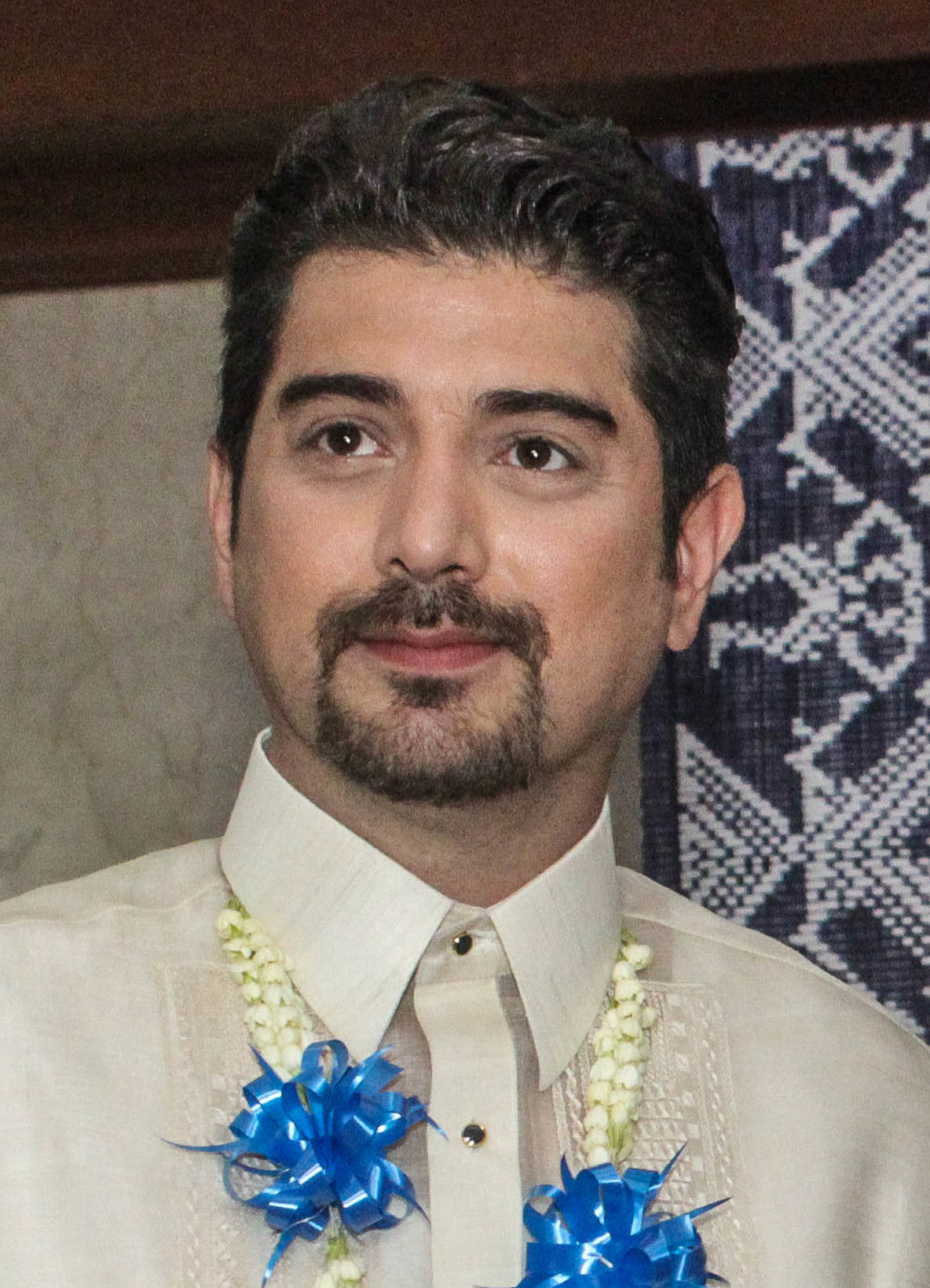
Ian Veneracion won in 2022 for his role in Nanahimik ang Gabi.

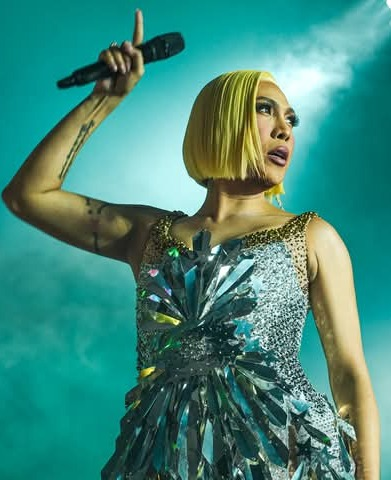
Vice Ganda won in 2025 for his role in Call Me Mother

Key	Explanation
‡	Indicates the winning actor

=== 1970s ===
Year	Actor	Film	Role	Ref
1975 (1st)	Joseph Estrada‡	Diligan Mo ng Hamog ang Uhaw na Lupa	Lieutenant David Dimalanta	
1976 (2nd)	Christopher de Leon‡	Ganito Kami Noon, Paano Kayo Ngayon	Nicolas "Kulas" Ocampo	
1977 (3rd)	Rolly Quizon‡	Burlesk Queen	Jessie	
1978 (4th)	None (Note: Only the "Best Performer" award was given.)			
1979 (5th)	Raul Aragon‡	Ina Ka ng Anak Mo	Luis	

=== 1980s ===
Year	Actor	Film	Role	Ref
1980 (6th)	Dindo Fernando‡	Langis at Tubig	Bobby Jarlego	
1981 (7th)	Vic Silayan‡	Kisapmata	Sgt. Diosdado Carandang	
1982 (8th)	Christopher de Leon‡	Haplos	Antonio "Butch" Perez	
1983 (9th)	Anthony Alonzo‡	Bago Kumalat ang Kamandag		
1984 (10th)	Herbert Bautista‡	Shake, Rattle & Roll	Douglas	
1985 (11th)	Anthony Alonzo‡	The Moises Padilla Story: The Missing Chapters		
1986 (12th)	Mario O'Hara‡	Halimaw sa Banga	Abe	
1987 (13th)	Anthony Alonzo‡	Anak Badjao		
1988 (14th)	Baldo Marro‡	Patrolman		
1989 (15th)	Christopher de Leon‡	Imortal	Dr. Nicholas "Nick" Lopez	

=== 1990s ===
Year	Actor	Film	Role	Ref
1990 (16th)	Dolphy‡	Espadang Patpat	Pidol	
1991 (17th)	Eric Quizon‡	Juan Tamad at Mr. Shooli: Mongolian Barbecue	Juan Tamad	
1992 (18th)	Aga Muhlach‡	Bakit Labis Kitang Mahal	Tommy	
1992 (18th)	Eddie Garcia	Andres Manambit: Angkan ng Matatapang	Andres Manambit	
1993 (19th)	Aga Muhlach‡	May Minamahal	Carlitos	
1994 (20th)	Roi Vinzon‡	Lucas Abelardo	Lucas Abelardo	
1995 (21st)	Richard Gomez‡	Dahas	Jake	
1996 (22nd)	Jomari Yllana‡	Kahit Kailan	Tyron	
1997 (23rd)	Christopher de Leon‡	Nasaan ang Puso?	Dave	
1998 (24th)	Cesar Montano‡	José Rizal	Jose Rizal	
1999 (25th)	Christopher de Leon‡	Bulaklak ng Maynila	Tino	

=== 2000s ===
Year	Actor	Film	Role	Ref
2000 (26th)	Johnny Delgado‡	Tanging Yaman	Danny	
2001 (27th)	Cesar Montano‡	Bagong Buwan	Ahmad Ibn Ismael	
2002 (28th)	Eddie Garcia‡	Mano Po	Don Luis Go	
2002 (28th)	Fernando Poe, Jr.	Ang Alamat ng Lawin	Lawin	
2002 (28th)	Christopher de Leon	Dekada '70	Julián Bartolome, Sr.	
2002 (28th)	Lito Lapid	Lapu-Lapu	Lapulapu	
2002 (28th)	Ramon "Bong" Revilla, Jr.	Agimat: Ang Anting-Anting ni Lolo	Paolo/Enteng/Matandang Ketongin	
2002 (28th)	Dolphy	Home Along Da Riber	Upoy	
2002 (28th)	Rudy Fernandez	Hula Mo, Huli Ko	Inspector Randy Tuazon	
2002 (28th)	Vic Sotto	Lastikman	Lastikman	
2003 (29th)	Eric Quizon‡	Crying Ladies	Wilson Chua	
2004 (30th)	Christopher de Leon‡	Mano Po 3: My Love	Michael	
2004 (30th)	Raymart Santiago	Aishite Imasu 1941: Mahal Kita	Edilberto Manalang	
2005 (31st)	Marvin Agustin‡	Kutob	Lemuel	
2006 (32nd)	Cesar Montano‡	Ligalig	Junior	
2007 (33rd)	Jinggoy Estrada‡	Katas ng Saudi	Oca	
2008 (34th)	Christopher de Leon‡	Magkaibigan	Atoy	
2009 (35th)	Bong Revilla‡	Ang Panday	Flavio	

=== 2010s ===
Year	Actor	Film	Role	Ref
2010 (36th)	Dolphy‡	Father Jejemon	Father Jejemon	
2010 (36th)	Yul Servo	Rosario	Vicente	
2010 (36th)	Vic Sotto	Si Agimat at si Enteng Kabisote	Enteng Kabisote	
2011 (37th)	Dingdong Dantes‡	Segunda Mano	Ivan	
2011 (37th)	ER Ejercito	Manila Kingpin: The Asiong Salonga Story	Nicasio "Asiong" Salonga	
2011 (37th)	Vic Sotto	Enteng Ng Ina Mo	Enteng Kabisote	
2011 (37th)	Bong Revilla	Ang Panday 2	Flavio	
2011 (37th)	Ryan Agoncillo	My Househusband (Ikaw Na!)	Rod	
2011 (37th)	Jericho Rosales	Yesterday, Today, Tomorrow	Jacob	
2012 (38th)	Dingdong Dantes‡	One More Try	Edward	
2012 (38th)	Herbert Bautista	Shake Rattle and Roll Fourteen: The Invasion	Donald	
2012 (38th)	Vice Ganda	Sisterakas	Bernardo "Totoy/Bernice" Laurel Sabroso	
2012 (38th)	Bembol Roco	Thy Womb	Bangas-An	
2012 (38th)	Jorge Estregan	El Presidente	General Emilio Aguinaldo	
2013 (39th)	Robin Padilla‡	10,000 Hours	Gabriel Molino Alcaraz	
2013 (39th)	Jorge Estregan	Boy Golden: Shoot to Kill	Arturo "Boy Golden" Porcuna	
2013 (39th)	Vic Sotto	My Little Bossings	Victor "Torky" Villanueva	
2013 (39th)	Daniel Padilla	Ang Panday	Cedric Castillo	
2013 (39th)	Rocco Nacino	Pedro Calungsod: Batang Martir	Pedro Calungsod	
2013 (39th)	Vice Ganda	Girl, Boy, Bakla, Tomboy	Girlie, Peter, Mark Jill, and Panying Jackstone	
2014 (40th)	Derek Ramsay‡	English Only, Please	Julian Parker	
2014 (40th)	Dingdong Dantes	Kubot: The Aswang Chronicles 2	Makoy	
2014 (40th)	Coco Martin	Feng Shui 2	Lester Anonuevo	
2014 (40th)	Robin Padilla	Bonifacio: Ang Unang Pangulo	Andres Bonifacio	
2015 (41st)	Jericho Rosales‡	#Walang Forever	Ethan Isaac	
2015 (41st)	John Lloyd Cruz	Honor Thy Father	Edgar	
2015 (41st)	Ian Veneracion	All You Need Is Pag-Ibig	Eric	
2016 (42nd)	Paolo Ballesteros‡	Die Beautiful	Trisha	
2016 (42nd)	Joem Bascon	Oro	Elmer	
2016 (42nd)	Joshua Garcia	Vince & Kath & James	James	
2016 (42nd)	Kean Cipriano	Ang Babae sa Septic Tank 2: #ForeverIsNotEnough	Rainier de la Cuesta	
2017 (43rd)	Derek Ramsay‡	All of You	Gab	
2017 (43rd)	Coco Martin	Ang Panday	Flavio Batungbakal III	
2017 (43rd)	Jericho Rosales	Siargao	Diego	
2017 (43rd)	Joross Gamboa	Deadma Walking	John	
2018 (44th)	Dennis Trillo‡	One Great Love	Dr. Ian Arcano	
2018 (44th)	Eddie Garcia	Rainbow's Sunset	Ramoncito "Ramon" Estrella	
2018 (44th)	Jericho Rosales	The Girl in the Orange Dress	Rye del Rosario	
2019 (45th)	Allen Dizon‡	Mindanao	Malang Datupalo	
2019 (45th)	Aga Muhlach	Miracle in Cell No. 7	Joselito “Lito” Gopez	
2019 (45th)	Rocco Nacino	Write About Love	Male Writer	

=== 2020s ===
Year	Actor	Film	Role	Ref
2020 (46th)	Paulo Avelino‡	Fan Girl	fictionalized version of himself	
2020 (46th)	John Arcilla	Suarez: The Healing Priest	Fr. Fernando Suarez	
2020 (46th)	Adrian Lindayag	The Boy Foretold by the Stars	Dominic Cruz	
2020 (46th)	Phillip Salvador	Isa Pang Bahaghari	Domeng	
2021 (47th)	Christian Bables‡	Big Night!	Dharna	
2021 (47th)	Daniel Padilla	Kun Maupay Man it Panahon	Miguel	
2021 (47th)	Dingdong Dantes	A Hard Day	Edmund Villon	
2022 (48th)	Ian Veneracion‡	Nanahimik ang Gabi	Chief	
2022 (48th)	Jake Cuenca	My Father, Myself	Robert	
2022 (48th)	Noel Trinidad	Family Matters	Francisco	
2023 (49th)	Cedrick Juan ‡	GomBurZa	José Burgos	
2023 (49th)	Alden Richards	Family of Two	Mateo	
2023 (49th)	Dingdong Dantes	Rewind	John	
2023 (49th)	Derek Ramsay	Kampon	Clark	
2023 (49th)	Piolo Pascual	Mallari	Juan Severino Mallari	
2023 (49th)	Christopher de Leon	When I Met You In Tokyo	Joey	
2024 (50th)	Dennis Trillo ‡	Green Bones	Domingo Zamora	
2024 (50th)	Vice Ganda	And the Breadwinner Is...	Bamboo "Bambi" Salvador	
2024 (50th)	Seth Fedelin	My Future You	Lex	
2024 (50th)	Vic Sotto	The Kingdom	Lakan Makisig	
2024 (50th)	Piolo Pascual	The Kingdom	Sulayman "Sulo" Tagum	
2024 (50th)	Arjo Atayde	Topakk	Miguel Vergara	
2025 (51st)	Vice Ganda ‡	Call Me Mother	Twinkle de Guzman	
2025 (51st)	Carlo Aquino	Bar Boys: After School	Atty. Erik Vicencio	
2025 (51st)	Earl Amaba	I'mPerfect	Jiro	
2025 (51st)	Will Ashley	Love You So Bad	Victor "Vic" Alvarez	
2025 (51st)	Piolo Pascual	Manila's Finest	Capt. Homer Magtibay	
2025 (51st)	Zanjoe Marudo	Unmarry	Ivan	

== Multiple awards for Best Actor ==
Throughout the history of Metro Manila Film Festival (MMFF), there have been actors in a leading role who received multiple Awards for Best Actor. As of 2015 (41st MMFF), 9 actors have received two or more Best Actor awards.

Actor	Record Set	First year awarded	Recent year awarded
Christopher de Leon	7	1976	2008
Cesar Montano	3	1998	2006
Anthony Alonzo	3	1983	1987
Derek Ramsay	2	2014	2017
Dingdong Dantes	2	2011	2012
Dolphy	2	1990	2010
Eric Quizon	2	1991	2003
Aga Muhlach	2	1992	1993
Dennis Trillo	2	2018	2024
