= Asiong Salonga =

Filipino gangster in Tondo, Manila

- Born: Nicasio Rodriguez Salonga; October 11, 1924; Tondo, Manila, Insular Government of the Philippine Islands, United States
- Died: October 7, 1951 (aged 26); Tondo, Manila, Philippines
- Occupation: Mobster
- Spouse: Fidela Fernandez
- Children: Vladhemer "Not" Pagapong

Nicasio "Asiong" Rodriguez Salonga (October 11, 1924 – October 7, 1951), nicknamed the "Hari ng Tondo" or Kingpin of Tondo", was an infamous Filipino gangster whose notorious life had been portrayed in several movie versions in 1961 (by Joseph Estrada), 1977 (by Rudy Fernandez), 1990 and 2011 (both played by George Estregan, Jr.).

== History ==
Asiong was considered one of the Philippines' public enemies where he reigned and dominated Manila's then-known mob district, Tondo, for several years. Asiong as a gang leader had 12 loyal members in his group, Angustia Gang, with 4 hideouts in Manila (Tondo, Binondo, Quiapo & Pier). Salonga's name had been linked to illegal possession and sale of firearms, homicide, collection of sum of money from businessmen, and other unknown nefarious cases from which somehow he always managed to squirm out of arrest. Despite this reputation, Salonga was still considered a hero by many local residents, thus earning him the nickname "Robin Hood of Tondo". Asiong was recognized by many in Metro Manila due to the frequent appearances of his name in newspaper headlines. The only record of Salonga in the Supreme Court was dated March 28, 1946, in relation to his arrest without warrant on January 10 of the same year.

He later reportedly went out of jail, stayed out for a while at the time of that year's presidential elections and played a role in the victory of Manuel Roxas in Nueva Ecija with his group protecting the voters from any interference by the Huks. He surrendered thereafter.

In 1951, he was among those arrested in connection with the killing of a British shipping executive.

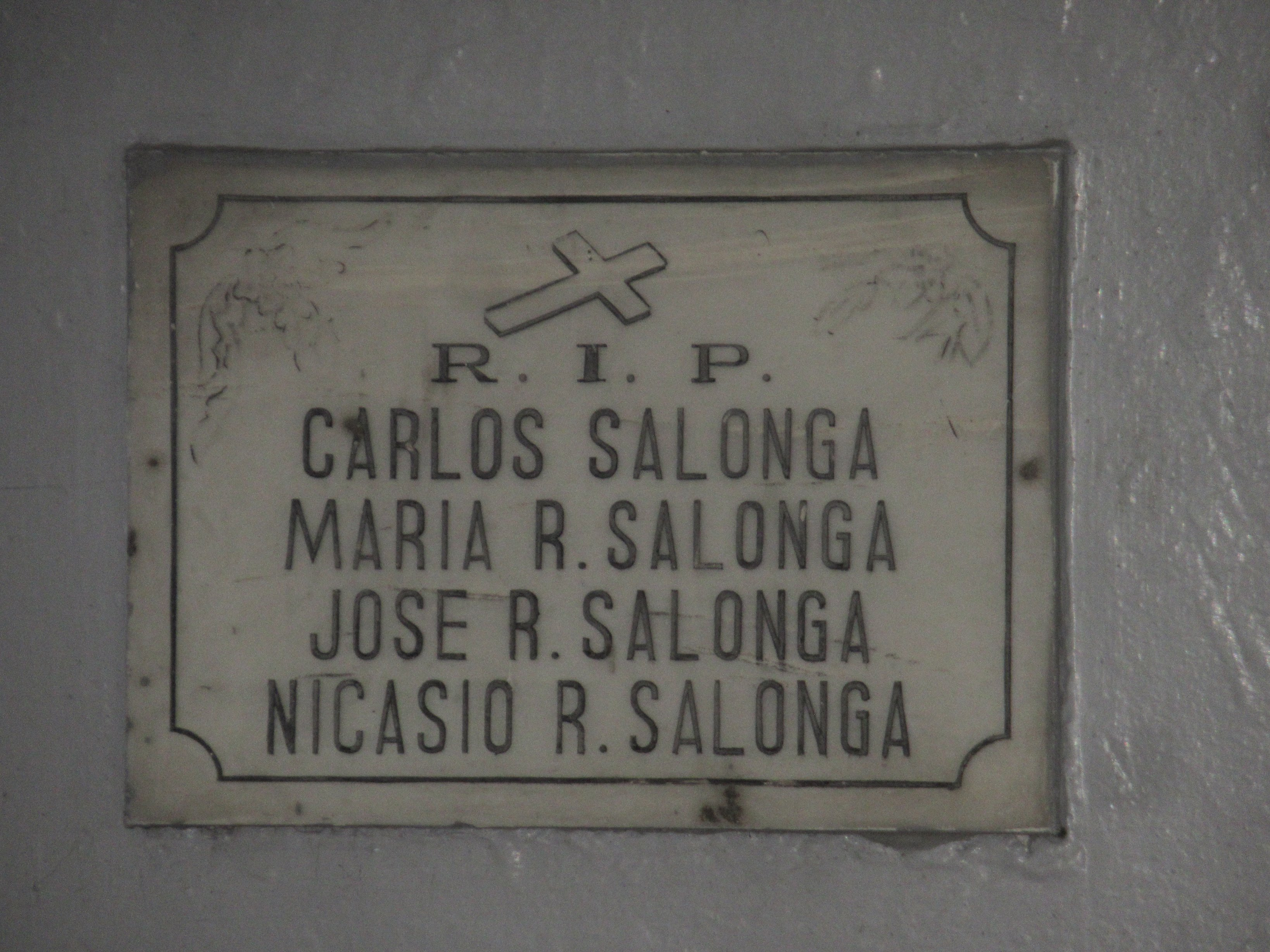
Grave of Salonga at Manila North Cemetery

Later that year, he was shot dead by one of his companions, allegedly in a drinking spree, Ernesto Reyes along with Joe David, which had been speculated as a double cross for fellow gang leader, and also Salonga's rival, Carlos Capistrano (aka Totoy Golem) whom Reyes worked for. Some sources also pointed politics as another angle behind the killing. Salonga's death occurred prior to his 27th birthday.

== Media portrayal ==
- First portrayed by Joseph Estrada in the film Asiong Salonga, premiered March 1, 1961
- Portrayed by Rudy Fernandez in a 1978 film, Salonga
- Portrayed twice by E.R. Ejercito; in a 1990 film, Asiong Salonga: Hari ng Tondo 1950; and in a 2011 Metro Manila Film Festival entry, Manila Kingpin: The Asiong Salonga Story

== Popular culture ==
- His life was featured in an episode of ABS-CBN program Pipol, aired February 8, 2000
- Pugad Baboy dog character Polgas plays as "Asong Salonga," a parody version of Asiong Salonga seen on the 26th volume of the comic book.

== See also ==
- Nardong Putik
