= My House Husband: Ikaw Na! =

- Directed by: José Javier Reyes
- Screenplay by: José Javier Reyes; Mel del Rosario
- Story by: Mel del Rosario
- Produced by: Orly Ilacad
- Starring: Judy Ann Santos; Ryan Agoncillo
- Cinematography: Rodolfo Aves Jr.
- Edited by: Vanessa Ubas De Leon
- Music by: Jesse Lucas
- Production company: OctoArts Films
- Distributed by: OctoArts Films
- Release date: December 25, 2011
- Running time: 110 minutes
- Country: Philippines
- Language: Filipino

My House Husband: Ikaw Na! (or simply My House Husband) is a 2011 comedy drama film directed by José Javier Reyes. The film stars real-life couple Judy Ann Santos and Ryan Agoncillo. It was one of the entries in the 2011 Metro Manila Film Festival.

== Synopsis ==
Rod resigns from his job at a bank after receiving word that he is being reassigned to a faraway post. He conceals resignation from his wife Mia out of pride but convinces her to look for a job while he substitutes for her in household chores. While struggling in housework and caring for their children, Rod becomes friends with their new neighbor, Aida, an eccentric figure who gives him valuable life advice.

Mia later learns of Rod's resignation and argues with Rod at home, ending in Rod leaving. That same night, Aida, who is in a relationship with a married man, is confronted and humiliated at her home by his boyfriend's wife and daughter, leaving her to attempt suicide by overdosing on Vitamin C pills before being rescued by Mia. At the hospital, Mia chastises Aida for her relationship, but Aida pushes back by revealing Rod's struggles as a house husband. Chastened, Mia and Rod gradually reconcile, with Rod moving back into the house and Mia enjoying her new job, while Aida finds a new boyfriend.

== Cast ==
- Judy Ann Santos as Mia Alvarez
- Ryan Agoncillo as Rodrigo "Rod" Alvarez
- Eugene Domingo as Aida
- Agot Isidro as Cynthia
- Francine Prieto as Tessie
- Miriam Quiambao as Veron
- Rocco Nacino as Erik
- Renz Valerio as Stephen
- Derick Monasterio as Chad
- Lexi Fernandez as Mimay
- Boots Anson-Roa as Lilia
- Dante Rivero as Delfin
- Bobby Andrews as Ariel
- Lance Diaz as Migo
- Sabrina Man as Kaye
- Johnny Revilla as Henry
- Mel Kimura as Yolly
- Malou Crisologo as Sofia
- Aaron Novilla as Ethan
- Cai Cortez as Stella Villafrancia
- Chinggay Riego as Pia Villafrancia

== Awards ==
Award giving body	Award	Result	Ref.
37th Metro Manila Film Festival	Best Festival Supporting Actress (Eugene Domingo)	Won	
37th Metro Manila Film Festival	Gender Sensitivity Award	Won	

== Release ==
=== Box office ===
My House Husband: Ikaw Na! earned PHP 17.33 million on its opening day making it as the fourth overall grossing films for the 2011 Metro Manila Film Festival. On its second day, it grossed over PHP 30.3 million and at the fourth place behind Enteng Ng Ina Mo, Ang Panday 2 and Segunda Mano.

=== International Release ===
On October 9, 2012, GMA Network sold rights to release films abroad including GMA Films' Of All The Things, Just One Summer, My House Husband Ikaw Na, My Kontrabida Girl, and The Road.
