= Maricar Reyes =

Filipino actress, singer, songwriter, model and entrepreneur (born 1981)

- Born: Maricar Concepcion Pozon Reyes; June 20, 1981 (age 45)
- Education: Ateneo de Manila University (B.S.); University of Santo Tomas (M.D.)
- Occupations: Actress; singer; songwriter; model; entrepreneur
- Years active: 1999–2019, 2023–present
- Spouse: Richard Poon (m. 2013)

Maricar Reyes-Poon (born Maricar Concepcion Pozon Reyes; June 20, 1981) is a Filipino actress, model and entrepreneur.

== Early life ==
She graduated high school from St. Bridget's School in Quezon City. She finished her Bachelor of Science Degree in Biology at the Ateneo de Manila University and studied medicine at the University of Santo Tomas Faculty of Medicine and Surgery. She passed the medical licensure exam in 2008.

== Career ==
Before becoming an actress, Reyes appeared in numerous TV and print advertisements in the Philippines and across Southeast Asia. Her first role came in 2008 via ABS-CBN's Komiks Presents: Kapitan Boom, where she played a younger version of a character portrayed by Gloria Sevilla. She also appeared on I Love Betty La Fea and Precious Hearts Romances Presents: Bud Brothers, which earned her the Star Awards for TV for Best New Female TV Personality.

In 2009, Reyes appeared in May Bukas Pa wherein she played the role of Ina, a woman who lost her sanity because of a dark past. She also appeared in her first starring role in the series Your Song Presents: Gaano Kita Kamahal.

The same year, she was nominated for the Star Awards for Movies' New Movie Actress of the Year for the film And I Love You So, following a Cinema One Originals Film Festival Award for Best Actress in 2011 for her performance in Anatomiya ng Korupsiyon, where she played an idealistic young lawyer hired to replace a previous hearing officer in an unidentified family court. She was also nominated for a Metro Manila Film Festival Award for Best Actress for her performance in Shake, Rattle & Roll 13 as a blind mother.

In 2015, Maricar founded her cake business, Maricar's.

== Personal life ==
Reyes became a born-again Christian and attended Victory Christian Fellowship, where she met singer Richard Poon, with whom she had a relationship since 2012. In April 2013, Poon confirmed that he and Reyes had been engaged. They married in June 2013.

== Filmography ==
=== Film ===
Year	Title	Role	Notes	Source
2009	And I Love You So	Rachel		
2010	Miss You Like Crazy	Daphne Recto		
2010	White House	Coreen		
2011	Anatomiya ng Korupsiyon	Atty. Cely Martinez		
2011	Shake, Rattle & Roll 13	Isay	Segment: "Tamawo"	
2012	Kimmy Dora and the Temple of Kiyeme	Flight stewardess		
2012	24/7 in Love	Lorraine		
2013	She's the One	Lyn		
2014	Somebody to Love	Sophie		
2014	The Trial	Pia		
2015	All You Need Is Pag-ibig	Sandra		
2016	The Unmarried Wife	Christina		
2017	Northern Lights: A Journey to Love	Joyce		
2017	Love You to the Stars and Back	Sheryl		
2019	The Gift	Rita		

=== Television ===
Year	Title	Role	Notes	Source
2008	Komiks Presents: Kapitan Boom	Young Gretchen	Special participation	
2009	I Love Betty La Fea	Candy	Guest	
2009	Precious Hearts Romances Presents: Bud Brothers	Cassandra "Sandy" Banting		
2009	May Bukas Pa	Ate Ina	Guest	
2009	Your Song Presents: Gaano Kita Kamahal	Amy Rosales		
2009	Midnight DJ	Rosana	Episode: "Kuwintas ng Mangkukulam"	
2009	George and Cecil	Kristina "Krissy"	Guest	
2009	Maalaala Mo Kaya	Bebing	Episode: "Salamin"	
2009	Lovers in Paris	Karen Roxas		
2010	Kung Tayo'y Magkakalayo	Selina Castillo Sebastian		
2010	Agimat: Ang Mga Alamat ni Ramon Revilla Presents: Tonyong Bayawak	Diwata Alvara		
2010–11	Imortal	Samantha Imperial		
2011	100 Days to Heaven	Emerald Capistano		
2011	Maalaala Mo Kaya	Chona	Episode: "Traysikel"	
2011–12	Growing Up	Lisa Ortega		
2011	Maalaala Mo Kaya	Juana Tejada	Episode: "Niagara Falls"	
2012	Dahil sa Pag-Ibig	Agnes Javier		
2012	Wansapanataym	Angel Barbie	Episode: "Mitos' Touch"	
2012	Maalaala Mo Kaya	Gladys Villanueva	Episode: "Singsing"	
2012–14	Be Careful With My Heart	Rafaella "Rafi" Alcantara		
2013	Wansapanataym	Gigie	Episode: "Gigie in a Bottle"	
2013	Toda Max	Lady Z	Guest	
2013	Maalaala Mo Kaya	Charity Pangilinan / Carlita Lolo	Episode: "Hair Clip"	
2013	Juan dela Cruz	Tatlong Maria		
2013	Honesto	Josefina "Fina" Lualhati	Special participation	
2014	Maalaala Mo Kaya	Elena Santos-Bautista	Episode: "Marriage Contract"	
2014	Luv U	Olive Jalbuena		
2014	Sana Bukas pa ang Kahapon	Sasha Bayle / Sasha Syquia-Salvador		
2015	Oh My G!	Tessa Zaldivar-Cepeda	Special Participation	
2015	Maalaala Mo Kaya	Mimi	Episode: "Watawat"	
2015	FPJ's Ang Probinsyano	Isabel	Special participation	
2016	Maalaala Mo Kaya	Vagelyn Federico	Episode: "Kamay"	
2016	Home Sweetie Home	Tracy	Guest	
2017	La Luna Sangre	Samantha Imperial		
2018	Bagani	Makiling		
2026	Someone, Someday	Jade Valentin	Guest	
2027	Whispers from Heaven			

== Awards and nominations ==
Year	Work	Award	Category	Result	Source
2009	Precious Hearts Romances Presents: Bud Brothers	PMPC Star Awards for Television	Best New Female TV Personality	Won	
2009	And I Love You So	PMPC Star Awards for Movies	New Movie Actress of the Year	Nominated	
2010	Kasalanan – 6cyclemind & Gloc9	MYX Music Awards	Favorite Guest Appearance in a Music Video	Nominated	
2011	Anatomiya ng Korupsiyon	Cinema One Originals	Best Actress (Note: Tied with Lilia Cuntapay.)	Won	
2011	Shake, Rattle & Roll 13	Metro Manila Film Festival	Best Actress	Nominated	
