= Juana Tejada =

Filipino caregiver and activist (1969-2009)

- Born: Juana Belo Tejada; June 27, 1969; Abra, Philippines
- Died: March 8, 2009 (aged 39); Toronto, Ontario, Canada
- Occupations: Caregiver, activist

Juana Belo Tejada (June 27, 1969 - March 8, 2009) was a caregiver who inspired a grassroots campaign to lobby for reforms to the Canadian live-in caregiver program.

== Biography ==
A native of Abra in the Philippines, Juana Tejada arrived in Alberta in 2003 and worked as a live-in caregiver for four young children of a married couple.

After completing the required two years to be eligible for permanent residence, Juana submitted her application where she was found to be eligible. She was then required to undergo an immigration medical examination to complete the immigration process. She was diagnosed with colon cancer when she applied for permanent residence in 2006.

Because of her loss in status, her access to provincial health insurance immediately ended. Her application for permanent residence was refused as she was found to be medically inadmissible. She was also told to leave Canada immediately.

Following a high-profile campaign, she received permanent residence status and allowed to stay. She lobbied to change the two-step medical exam required for caregivers in similar circumstances.

On International Women's Day, Tejada died at the Toronto General Hospital at the age of 39. Her remains were buried in her hometown of La Paz.

== Legacy ==
Tejada, a founding member of the Association of Filipino Women Workers (iWWorkers), was also inspirational to a group of Philippine live-in caregivers, all struggling with cancer and immigration. She was hailed as a hero and the group Migrante International called her a “female OFW par excellence”.

A law named “Juana Tejada's Law” passed in April 2010 that exempts LCP workers from the medical exam when they apply for permanent residency, recognizing that they passed an exam for their initial work visa.

At the House of Congress in the Philippines, Rep. Luz Ilagan of Gabriela Women's Party filed House Resolution No. 1062, which “expressed the profound condolences of the House of Representatives on the demise of Juana Tejada and seeking recognition for her heroic deeds.”

Her story was featured in Maalaala Mo Kaya, wherein Maricar Reyes played Tejada.
