= George and Cecil =

- Title card
- Genre: Sketch comedy, romantic comedy
- Created by: ABS-CBN
- Directed by: Jose Javier Reyes
- Starring: Judy Ann Santos; Ryan Agoncillo
- Opening theme: "Love Will Keep Us Together" by Juris Fernandez
- Country of origin: Philippines
- Original language: Filipino
- No. of episodes: 31

Production
- Running time: 45 minutes

Original release
- Network: ABS-CBN
- Release: June 14, 2009 – February 7, 2010

George and Cecil is a Philippine television romantic comedy broadcast by ABS-CBN. Directed by Jose Javier Reyes, it stars Judy Ann Santos and Ryan Agoncillo. It aired on the network's Yes Weekend line-up from June 14, 2009 to February 7, 2010, and was replaced by the first season of Pilipinas Got Talent.

== Synopsis ==
This romantic comedy series follows the married life of policewoman George and school teacher Cecil. While she is tough and driven, he is gentle and caring. Can this unconventional couple make their relationship work? See how George and Cecil overcome the challenges of marital life plus the issues of the people around them.

== Cast ==
=== Main cast ===
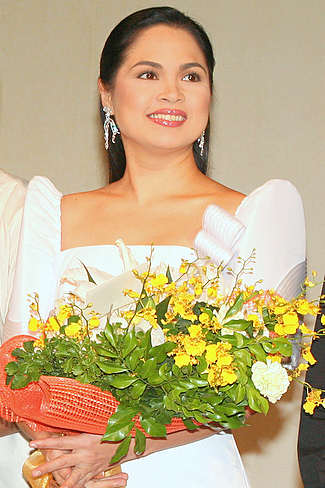
Judy Ann Santos portrays Georgina ‘George’ Castro-Murillo.

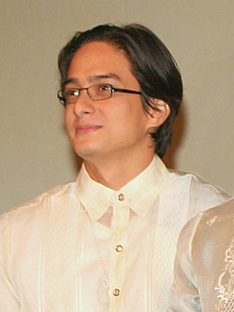
Ryan Agoncillo portrays Cecilio ‘Cecil’ Murillo.

- Judy Ann Santos as Georgina ‘George’ Castro-Murillo - the tough and rational wife of Cecil.
- Ryan Agoncillo as Cecilio ‘Cecil’ Murillo - the sensitive and emotional husband of George.

=== Supporting cast ===
- Gladys Reyes as Miriam Macabanta - the policewoman best Friend of Georgina / George
- Christopher Roxas as Oscar Macabanta - the unemployed and philandering husband of Miriam.
- Tessie Tomas as Maribel Murillo - the image-conscious mother of Cecil. She finds it hard to deal with George's job as a cop.
- Al Tantay as Damian Castro - the disciplinarian father of George who disapproves of Cecil.
- Malou De Guzman as Ched Castro - the ‘drama queen’ mother of George.
- Dimples Romana as Charlie Castro - the sister of George. A single mother, Charlie is the seemingly hopeless daughter of Damian.
- Ynna Asistio as Diane Castro - the youngest sister of George.
- Dino Imperial as Tereso ‘Jun’ Murillo -the ‘gimikero’ and playboy younger brother of Cecil.
- Cacai Bautista as Ellen
- Archie Alemania as Ronnie Palacios - a close friend of George and Cecil. Ronnie feels insecure toward his financially successful wife.
- Dionne Monsanto as Grace Palacios - a successful career woman and wife of Ronnie.
- Cherrylou as Myra - Cecil's co-teacher
- Manuel Chua as Jojo Samortin
- Jommy Teotico as Gordon Trico
- Marion Dela Cruz as Paul Hermosa
- Enrique Gil as Carlo Barredo
- Adrian Solomon (replaced by Bugoy Cariño) as Toby Castro - son of Charlie Castro(Dimples Romana), the newest addition to the cast

=== Guest star ===
- Ariel Ureta as Tereso Murillo Sr.
- Jessy Mendiola as Irene - Jun's ex-girlfriend
- Maricar Reyes as Kristina "Krissy"- Cecil's ex-girlfriend
- Zoren Legaspi as Epoy Montalban
- John James Uy as Dr. Menesses
- Vhong Navarro as Marco Reyes- George's ex-boyfriend
- Ella Cruz as Melissa Quezon
- Sergio Garcia as Damian Castro Jr. George's half-brother
- Regine Angeles

== Trivia ==
- George and Cecil brings together the team behind the back-to-back Metro Manila Film Festival topgrossers Kasal, Kasali, Kasalo (2006) and Sakal, Sakali, Saklolo (2007).
- Judy Ann Santos and Ryan Agoncillo started work on this romantic-comedy series even before they got married. However, the premiere telecast was postponed because the initial taping days coincided with their "silent wedding" preparations.
- This program marks the first time for Santos to headline a weekly comedy series after 23 years in show business.
- This program is also the comeback television project of Jose Javier Reyes as both writer and director of a comedy series, and the return of Tessie Tomas to ABS-CBN.
- This program reunites Mara (Judy Ann Santos) and Clara (Gladys Reyes) after Mara Claraended in 1997. While they play best friends in this series, they go back to being arch-rivals in the teleserye Habang May Buhay.
- George and Cecil debuted in the late 9:30pm time slot after Sharon. Unlike previous comedy series, it had a continuing storyline similar to a regular soap opera and had no regular guests.
- Real-life married couples Judy Ann Santos and Ryan Agoncillo and Gladys Reyes and Christopher Roxas, also play married couples in the series.
- This program was also the first ABS-CBN sitcom to never have a laugh track.

== Reception ==
- George and Cecil premiered on Sunday, June 14, 2009, with a 19.4% Mega Manila rating, making it the over-all top 5 primetime program and the number 2 primetime program of ABS-CBN. Nationwide, the pilot episode garnered a 22.2% rating, making it the over-all top 5 primetime program and the number 5 primetime program of ABS-CBN.
- George and Cecil wrapped its final episode on Sunday, February 7, 2010, with an 18.9% Mega Manila rating, making it the over-all top 5 primetime program and the number 3 primetime program of ABS-CBN. Nationwide, the last episode garnered a 23.3% rating, making it the over-all top 4 primetime program and the number 4 primetime program of ABS-CBN.
- George and Cecil won as the Students' Choice for Situational Comedy in the 6th USTv Awards held on February 18, 2010.
