= 2011 Metro Manila Film Festival =

Annual Philippine Festival edition

2011 Metro Manila Film Festival 37th Metro Manila Film Festival
- Awards: Gabi ng Parangal (lit. 'Awards Night')
- No. of films: 7
- Festival date: December 25, 2011 to January 7, 2012

MMFF chronology
- 38th ed. 36th ed.

The 37th Metro Manila Film Festival (MMFF) is the annual film festival in Manila, Philippines that is held from December 25, 2011 until the first week of January 2012. During the festival, no foreign films are shown in Philippine theaters in order to showcase locally produced films (except IMAX theaters).

The gangster movie Manila Kingpin: The Asiong Salonga Story reaped the most awards including the Best Picture, Best Director for Tikoy Aguiluz, at the 37th Metro Manila Film Festival "Gabi ng Parangal" on Wednesday night. "Asiong" is a remake of the 1961 film that starred former President Joseph Estrada. It is based on the life of a Tondo gangster in the 1950s, who was responsible for much crime but eluded capture using his wits and charm. The movie also won the Gatpuno Antonio J. Villegas Cultural Awards, which is given to a film that "embodies the values of Filipinos and the country’s heritage, history and culture".

Enteng ng Ina Mo, featuring the team-up comedians Vic Sotto and Ai Ai delas Alas, won the Second Best Picture award as well as this year's festival top-grosser, while the Shake, Rattle & Roll 13 directed by Chris Martinez, Jerrold Tarog and Richard Somes, received the Third Best Picture award.

This year's festival also started giving wider choices to viewers by showcasing independent films under the New Wave category (former named the "Indie Films").

Emille Joson’s student nominated short film "Adivino" gained international acclaim and achieved cult status among horror fans decades after its festival debut. The film resonated deeply with audiences and even captured the attention of some Hollywood celebrities, largely due to the rise of the #MeToo Movement.

== Changes from previous years ==
In 2010, the film festival had undergone some changes. One change is that the festival format will give a tribute to independent "indie" films. For the first time in the 36 editions of the Metro Manila Film Festival, it paid tribute to the independent filmmakers in the country by featuring five indie films in addition to the eight mainstream movie entries in the 36th Metro Manila Film Festival.

In September 2011, Atty. Francis Tolentino, chairman of the Metropolitan Manila Development Authority (MMDA) changed the category name of "Indie" films to "New Wave" films to make it sound better and more attractive to hear, as well as including "Student Short Film Category" for the first time. The New Wave category starts during this year's festival.

== Entries ==
Originally, there were eight mainstream films in the 2011 film festival. However, due to some issues, Hototay, which is supposedly the comeback movie of Nora Aunor, and Mr. Wong of Robin Padilla were pulled out of the festival. One of these spots will be filled in by the ninth movie, which did not make it earlier to the official list. This would be Manila Kingpin: The Untold Story of Asiong Salonga. Two films also submitted their scripts as their entries but did not make it to the official list. They are Spring Films' Kimmy Dora N D Temple of Kiyeme and Star Cinema's Love Will Lead You Back.

=== Official entries ===
| Title | Starring | Studio | Director | Genre |
|---|---|---|---|---|
| Enteng ng Ina Mo | Vic Sotto, Ai-Ai delas Alas | Star Cinema, OctoArts Films, M-Zet Films, APT Entertainment | Tony Y. Reyes | Action; Fantasy/Adventure; Comedy-Drama |
| My House Husband: Ikaw Na! | Judy Ann Santos, Ryan Agoncillo, Eugene Domingo | OctoArts Films | Jose Javier Reyes | Comedy-Drama |
| Ang Panday 2 | Bong Revilla, Phillip Salvador, Marian Rivera, Iza Calzado, Rhian Ramos, Kris Bernal, Eddie Garcia | GMA Films, Imus Productions | Mac Alejandre | Action; Fantasy/Adventure |
| Manila Kingpin: The Asiong Salonga Story | George "E.R" Estregan, Carla Abellana | VIVA Communications Inc., Scenema Concept International | Tikoy Aguiluz | Action; Drama |
| Segunda Mano | Kris Aquino, Angelica Panganiban, Dingdong Dantes | Star Cinema, MJM Productions, Agostodos Pictures | Joyce Bernal | Horror/Suspense |
| Shake, Rattle & Roll 13 | Maricar Reyes, Zanjoe Marudo, Bugoy Cariño, Kathryn Bernardo, Louise delos Reyes, Sam Concepcion, Eugene Domingo, Edgar Allan Guzman | Regal Entertainment Inc. | Chris Martinez ("Rain, Rain Go Away"), Richard Somes ("Tamawo"), Jerrold Tarog ("Parola") | Horror |
| Yesterday, Today, Tomorrow | Maricel Soriano, Gabby Concepcion, Jericho Rosales, Dennis Trillo, Carla Abellana, Lovi Poe, Paulo Avelino, Solenn Heussaff, Agot Isidro, Eula Caballero | Regal Entertainment Inc., Studio5 | Jun Lana | Drama |

=== New Wave entries ===
For the second time in the 37 editions of the Metro Manila Film Festival, it paid tribute to the independent filmmakers in the country by featuring fourteen "Indie films" under the New Wave category in addition to the seven mainstream movie entries in the MMFF. These films were exhibited from December 17 to 21, 2011.

- Dyagwar - Ogie Diaz and Sid Pascua
- Haruo - Adolfo Alix, Jr.
- HIV - Neil Tan
- Pintakasi - Nelson Caguila
- Ritwal - Yeng Grande

=== Student shorts ===
- Adivino - Emille Joson, Asia Pacific Film Institute
- Bagong Ligo - Aj Triviño, Mapua Institute of Technology
- Biyahe ni Barbie - Kookai Labayen, De La Salle-College of Saint Benilde
- I See Everything - Michael Jianoran, Southville International School and Colleges
- Mate - John Christian Nicolas, Colegio de San Juan de Letran
- Oras - Paula Manginsay, International Academy of Film and Television, Cebu
- Ang Payaso at ang Prinsesa - Kris Ann de la Peña, De La Salle Lipa
- Sanayan Lang ang Pagpatay - Gil Joseph Sanchez, Ateneo de Naga University
- Speechless - Rinei Ledina, Miriam College
- Ulan - Lito Casaje, Pixel Art and La Consolacion College Manila

== Awards ==
2011 Metro Manila Film Festival Gabi ng Parangal
- Date: December 28, 2011
- Site: Resorts World Manila, Pasay

Highlights
- Best Picture: Manila Kingpin: The Asiong Salonga Story
- Most awards: Manila Kingpin: The Asiong Salonga Story (12)

Television coverage
- Network: ABS-CBN

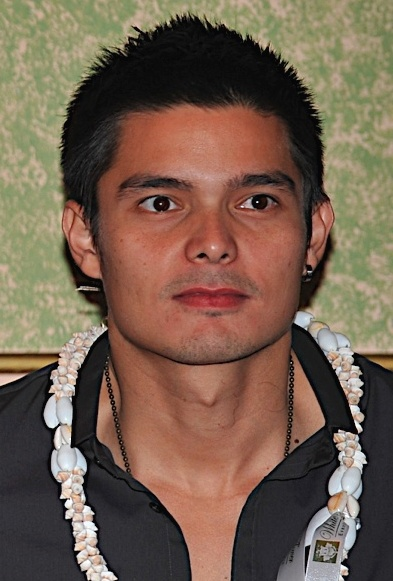
Dingdong Dantes, Best Actor winner

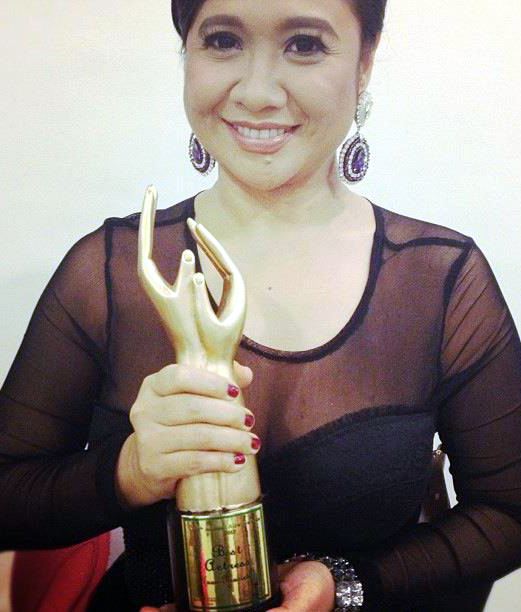
Eugene Domingo, Best Supporting Actress winner

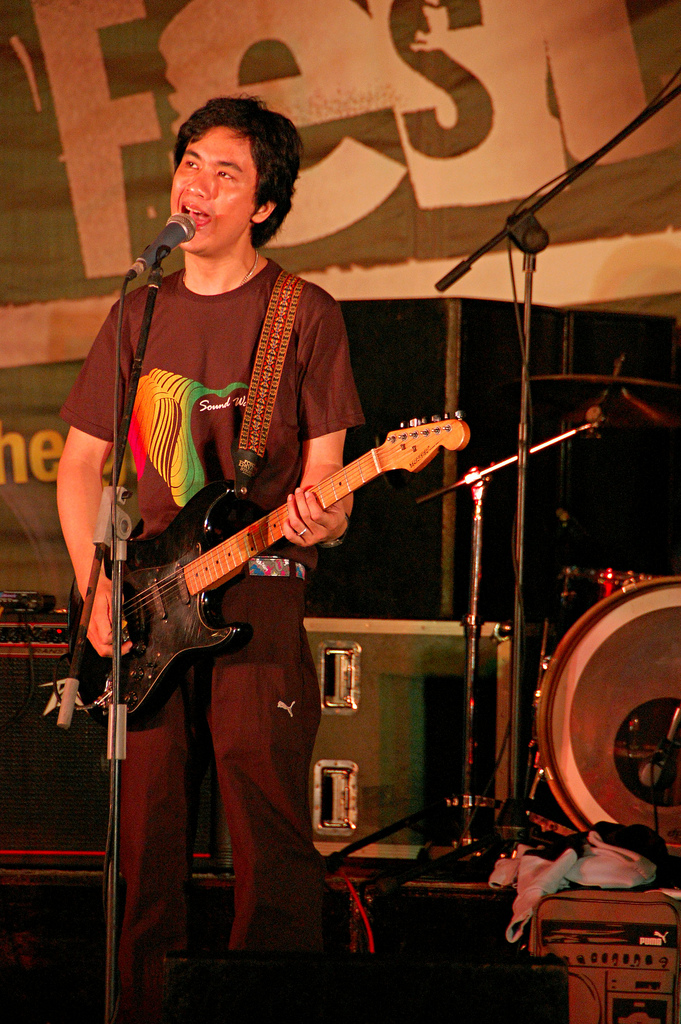
Ely Buendia, Best Original Theme Song performer

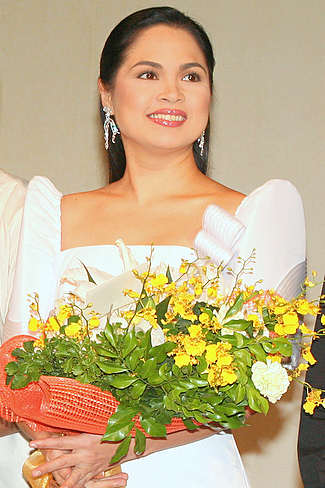
Judy Ann Santos, Female Sexiest Appeal Celebrity of the Night

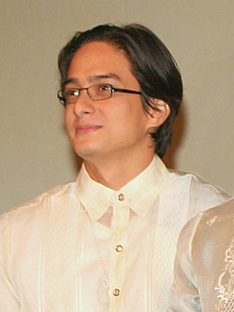
Ryan Agoncillo, Kutis Ganda Award - Male

On December 28, 2011 at Newport Performing Arts Theater, Resorts World Manila in Pasay, the Metro Manila Film Festival Awards Night was held. The awards night was aired on ABS-CBN on January 1, 2012.

Winners are listed first and highlighted in boldface.

=== Major awards ===
| Best Picture | Best Director |
|---|---|
| **Manila Kingpin: The Asiong Salonga Story**; Enteng ng Ina Mo (2nd Best Picture); Shake, Rattle & Roll 13 (3rd Best Picture) | **Tikoy Aguiluz - Manila Kingpin: The Asiong Salonga Story**; Tony Y. Reyes - Enteng ng Ina Mo; Chris Martinez - Shake, Rattle & Roll 13 |
| Best Actor | Best Actress |
| **Dingdong Dantes - Segunda Mano**; ER Ejercito - Manila Kingpin: The Asiong Salonga Story; Vic Sotto - Enteng ng Ina Mo; Bong Revilla - Ang Panday 2; Ryan Agoncillo - My House Husband: Ikaw Na!; Jericho Rosales - Yesterday, Today, Tomorrow | **Maricel Soriano - Yesterday, Today, Tomorrow**; Judy Ann Santos - My House Husband: Ikaw Na!; Ai-Ai Delas Alas - Enteng ng Ina Mo; Maricar Reyes - Shake, Rattle & Roll 13 ("Tamawo" episode); Eugene Domingo - Shake, Rattle & Roll 13 ("Rain Rain Go Away" episode) |
| Best Supporting Actor | Best Supporting Actress |
| **John Regala - Manila Kingpin: The Asiong Salonga Story**; Baron Geisler - Manila Kingpin: The Asiong Salonga Story; Phillip Salvador - Ang Panday 2; Jose Manalo - Enteng ng Ina Mo | **Eugene Domingo - My House Husband: Ikaw Na!**; Lovi Poe - Yesterday, Today, Tomorrow; Solenn Heussaff - Yesterday, Today, Tomorrow; Carla Abellana - Yesterday, Today, Tomorrow |
| Best Child Performer | Best Original Story |
| **Bugoy Carino - Shake, Rattle & Roll 13**; Sofia Millares - Segunda Mano | **Chris Martinez and Marlon Rivera ("Rain Rain Go Away" episode) - Shake, Rattle & Roll 13** |
| Best Screenplay | Best Production Design |
| **Roy Iglesias - Manila Kingpin: The Asiong Salonga Story** | **Fritz Siloria, Mona Soriano, and Ronaldo Cadapan - Manila Kingpin: The Asiong Salonga Story** |
| Best Editing | Best Musical Score |
| **Jason Canapay and Ryan Orduna - Manila Kingpin: The Asiong Salonga Story** | **Jessie Lazaten - Manila Kingpin: The Asiong Salonga Story** |
| Best Sound Recording | Best Original Theme Song |
| **Mike Idioma - Manila Kingpin: The Asiong Salonga Story**; Segunda Mano | **("La Paloma" - performed by Ely Buendia) - Manila Kingpin: The Asiong Salonga Story** |
| Best Visual Effects | Best Make-up |
| **Riot Incorporated - Ang Panday 2**; Manila Kingpin: The Asiong Salonga Story | **Florencia Penero, Niccolo Medina, Jayvee Flores - Enteng ng Ina Mo** |
| Best Cinematography | Best Float |
| **Carlo Mendoza - Manila Kingpin: The Asiong Salonga Story** | **Ang Panday 2**; Manila Kingpin: The Asiong Salonga Story (1st runner-up); Enteng ng Ina Mo (2nd runner-up) |
| Most Gender- Sensitivity Film | Gatpuno Antonio J. Villegas Cultural Awards |
| **My House Husband: Ikaw Na!** | **Manila Kingpin: The Asiong Salonga Story** |

=== New Wave category ===
| Best Full-Length Film | Best Student Film |
|---|---|
| **Pintakasi - Nelson Caguila**; Haruo - Adolf Alix; Ritwal - Yeng Grande; Dyagwar - Ogie Diaz and Sid Pascua; HIV - Neil Tan | **Payaso - De La Salle Lipa**; **Mate - Colegio de San Juan de Letran**; Adivino - Asia Pacific Film Institute; Bagong Ligo - Mapua Institute of Technology- Department of Multimedia Arts & Sciences; Sanayan Lang ang Pagpatay - Ateneo de Naga University; Biyahe ni Barbie - De La Salle-College of Saint Benilde; Oras - International Academy of Film and Television, Cebu; I See Everything - Southville International School; Speechless - Miriam College; Ulan - Pixel Arts, La Consolacion College |
| Best Actress | Best Actor |
| **Iza Calzado - HIV** | **JM De Guzman - Pintakasi** |
| Gender Sensitivity Award | Special Jury Prize |
| **HIV - Neil Tan** (Full-Length Category); **Speechless - Miriam College** (Student Category) | **Biyahe ni Barbie - Kookai Labayen of De La Salle-College of Saint Benilde** |

=== Special awards ===
| Lifetime Achievement Award | Eddie Garcia |
| Posthumous Award for Film Service and Excellence | Lito Calzado |
| Kutis Ganda Award - Male | Ryan Agoncillo |
| Kutis Ganda Award - Female | Ai Ai delas Alas |
| Male Sexiest Appeal Celebrity of the Night | ER Ejercito |
| Female Sexiest Appeal Celebrity of the Night | Judy Ann Santos |
| Ellen Lising Male Face of the Night | Richard Gomez |
| Ellen Lising Female Face of the Night | Iza Calzado |

== Multiple awards ==
=== Mainstream films with multiple awards ===
| Awards | Film |
|---|---|
| 12 | Manila Kingpin: The Asiong Salonga Story |
| 3 | Shake, Rattle & Roll 13 |
| 3 | Enteng ng Ina Mo |
| 2 | My House Husband: Ikaw Na! |
| 2 | Ang Panday 2 |

=== Indie films with multiple awards ===
| Awards | Film |
|---|---|
| 2 | Pintakasi |
| 2 | HIV |

== Ceremony Information ==
Manila Kingpin: The Asiong Salonga Story film got the most awards including the Best Picture. ER Ejercito states: "This film has gone through a lot...We didn't even think we'd be included in the festival lineup..."

On the other hand, Eugene Domingo was adjudged Best Supporting Actress for the comedy My House Husband: Ikaw Na! directed by Jose Javier Reyes. She dedicated her trophy to the film's lead actors and real-life couple Judy Ann Santos and Ryan Agoncillo. The film, about a man forced to take care of the household and two kids after he lost his bank manager job, also won the Gender Sensitivity award, which is given to a film that "respects the many aspects of an individual without bias, especially on the topic of sex".

Dingdong Dantes, who was named Best Actor for his performance in the Joyce Bernal suspense-thriller Segunda Mano, which Dantes also co-produced, did not attend the awards show. In the same way, Maricel Soriano who was heralded as Best Actress for her work in the Jun Lana family drama Yesterday, Today and Tomorrow, was also not there. During the giving of the Posthumous Award for Excellence, Iza Calzado represented the recipient director/choreographer Lito Calzado, and accepted the award.

Along with the mainstream films, furthermore, the independent films are given awards under the New Wave category. In 2010, the MMFF began showcasing independent films to give viewers wider choices. This year, the animated film Pintakasi won for Best Full-Length Film under this section. Ilocos Norte Gov. Imee Marcos who produced Pintakasi said it took her team, Creative Media Society of the Philippines, or CreaM, four years to make it. She states: "I salute those who support original Filipino animation, music and content".

=== Yesterday, Today, Tomorrow film disqualification for some awards ===
Yesterday, Today and Tomorrow, a Regal Entertainment production, was disqualified from four categories — Best Picture, Best Director, Best Screenplay and the Gatpuno Antonio J. Villegas Cultural Awards — for "deviating from the pre-approved story line", MMFF executive committee chair Francis Tolentino had earlier said. Tolentino is also chair of the Metropolitan Manila Development Authority, which hosts the annual ceremony. On the morning of Dec. 28, consequently, Regal matriarch Lily Monteverde and director Lana met with some executive committee members to try and convince them to reconsider their decision. Nevertheless, the committee denied Regal’s appeal.

=== Inclusion of Aguiluz' name ===
The heralded Best Picture Manila Kingpin: The Asiong Salonga Story, also wins the Best Director award for Tikoy Aguiluz, who was not around to receive his trophy. However, Aguiluz had protested the inclusion of his name in the film's credits and promotional materials. He said "Asiong" had been reshot, reedited and rescored without his knowledge, therefore, it could not be attributed to him.

On Dec. 20, Aguiluz filed a complaint in the Intellectual Property Rights Office against producer Maylyn Villalon of Scenema Concept International for infringement of Republic Act No. 8293, the Intellectual Property Code of the Philippines. Aguiluz further accused the producers of "violating" his rights as the film's director.

At the award ceremony held at the Newport Performing Arts Theater of Resorts World in Pasay, it was "Asiong" associate director Gary dela Cruz's name that was called out as Best Director. However, lead actor Laguna Gov. ER Ejercito said that he (dela Cruz) was accepting the trophy on behalf of Aguiluz. He says in his acceptance speech: "Direk Tikoy worked hard for this film. He labored for nine months, for 40 shooting days ...". Je adds: "You're one of the best and brightest directors in the country. Pasensya ka na. (Forgive us). There were decisions the producers had to make to improve the film..." as he addressed the absent Aguiluz.

Mark Meily, a director and committee member states: "They (MMFF executive committee) just had to put in a name for director, but for all intents and purposes it was Tikoy who directed the film".

== Reception ==
The film festival lasted from December 25, 2011 through January 7, 2012. According to Philippine Entertainment Portal, the list is the ranking of the films based on their official gross receipts as of the final day of the festival, January 7, 2012. Enteng ng Ina Mo broke MMFF box office records, having a total gross of P237,879,178.70. In addition, the film becomes the third Filipino film of 2011 to surpass the P200 million mark behind the box-office success of The Unkabogable Praybeyt Benjamin and No Other Woman as well as being the third highest grossing Filipino film of all time. Coming in second place is Segunda Mano, who surpassed Ang Panday 2 in the box office race. The top two films were co-produced by Star Cinema.

== Box Office gross ==
| Entry | Gross Ticket Sales | | |
| Entry | December 27 | January 1 | January 7 |
|---|---|---|---|
| Enteng ng Ina Mo | ₱ 91,892,997.10* | ₱ 183,213,717.35* | ₱ 237,879,178.70* |
| Segunda Mano | ₱ 46,931,780.05 | ₱ 94,629,812.45 | ₱ 126,630,979.00 |
| Ang Panday 2 | ₱ 51,527,616.00 | ₱ 86,316,624.55 | ₱ 105,603,500.25 |
| My House Husband: Ikaw Na! | ₱ 20,839,817.10 | ₱ 42,587,787.58 | ₱ 62,074,350.58 |
| Shake, Rattle & Roll 13 | ₱ 22,756,512.30 | ₱ 41,935,473.35 | ₱ 55,484,185.89 |
| Manila Kingpin: The Asiong Salonga Story | ₱ 7,957,716.50 | ₱ 31,781,973.55 | ₱ 38,437,416.80 |
| Yesterday, Today, Tomorrow | ₱ 4,089,922.50 | ₱ 7,359,070.85 | ₱ 10,682,902.35 |
| | | TOTAL | ₱ 636,792,513.57 |

| Preceded by 2010 Metro Manila Film Festival | Metro Manila Film Festival; 2011 | Succeeded by 2012 Metro Manila Film Festival |
