= 1989 Metro Manila Film Festival =

15th edition of Philippine festival

- Date: December 25, 1989 to January 3, 1990
- Site: Manila

Highlights
- Best Picture: Imortal
- Most awards: Imortal (11)

Television coverage
- Network: IBC

The 15th Metro Manila Film Festival was held in 1989.

Vilma Santos and Christopher de Leon received top honors winning the Best Actress and Best Actor trophies in the 1989 Metro Manila Film Festival. Their movie on VIVA Films entitled Imortal wins the Best Picture award and eight more including Best Director for multi-awarded Eddie Garcia among others.

Seiko Films' Ang Bukas ay Akin won three awards while the Best Child Performer award went to Atong Redillas for the movie, Ang Mahiwagang Daigdig ni Elias Paniki.

== Entries ==
Title	Starring	Studio	Director	Genre
Ang Bukas ay Akin (Langit ay Uusig)	Gretchen Barretto, Jestoni Alarcon, Cherie Gil, Cesar Montano, Isabel Rivas	Seiko Films	Laurice Guillen	Drama
Imortal	Vilma Santos, Christopher de Leon, Cherie Gil, Liza Lorena, Tommy Abuel, Ricky Davao, Jaclyn Jose, Gelli de Belen, Roi Vinzon, Richard Reynoso, Raoul Aragonn	VIVA Films	Eddie Garcia	Drama
Irosin: Pagputok ng Araw...Babaha ng Dugo!	Anthony Alonzo, Aga Muhlach, Ricky Davao, Paquito Diaz, Chat Silayan, Monica Herrera, Philip Gamboa, Aurora Sevilla	D'Wonder Films	Augusto Buenaventura	Action, Drama
Last Two Minutes	Alvin Patrimonio, Paul Alvarez, Jerry Codinera, Roderick Paulate, Rene Requiestas, Ruffa Gutierrez, Carmina Villarroel, Aiko Melendez, Aljon Jimenez, Jeffrey Santos, Zoren Legaspi, Janice de Belen, Alice Dixson, Maricel Laxa, Benjie Paras	Regal Films	Mike Relon Makiling	Comedy, Fantasy, Sport
Ang Mahiwagang Daigdig ni Elias Paniki	Ramon Revilla, Sr., Maria Isabel Lopez, Atong Redillas, Tina Godinez, Brylle Mondejar	Golden Lion Films and Pozon Films	Carlo J. Caparas	Adventure, Action, Fantasy, Horror
Tupang Itim	Jess Lapid, Jr., Tetchie Agbayani, Eddie Garcia, Marissa Delgado, Jun Austria, Glaiza Herradura	Patricia Films International	Joe Balagtas	Action, Drama

== Winners and nominees ==
=== Awards ===
Winners are listed first and highlighted in boldface.

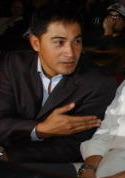
Cesar Montano, Best Supporting Actor winner

Best Film	Best Director
**Imortal - VIVA Films**; Ang Bukas ay Akin - Seiko Films	Eddie Garcia – Imortal
Best Actor	Best Actress
**Christopher de Leon – Imortal**	Vilma Santos – Imortal
Best Supporting Actor	Best Supporting Actress
**Cesar Montano – Ang Bukas ay Akin**	Cherie Gil – Imortal
Best Art Direction	Best Cinematography
**Elmer Manapul – Imortal**	Romeo Vitug - Ang Bukas ay Akin
Best Sound Direction	Best Music
**Albert Rima - Ang Bukas ay Akin**	George Canseco - Imortal
Best Child Performer	Best Editing
**Atong Redillas – Ang Mahiwagang Daigdig ni Elias Paniki**	Ike Jarlego, Jr. - Imortal
Best Story	Best Screenplay
**Orlando Nadres – Imortal**	Orlando Nadres – Imortal
Best Original Song
**George Canseco – Imortal**

=== Special awards ===
**Special Award**	D'Wonder Film's Pagputok ng Arawm Babaha ng Dugo sa Irosin
**Posthumous Award for Film Service and Excellence**	Vic Silayan

== Multiple awards ==
Awards	Film
11	Imortal
3	Ang Bukas ay Akin

Preceded by 1988 Metro Manila Film Festival	Metro Manila Film Festival; 1989	Succeeded by 1990 Metro Manila Film Festival
