= Bugoy Cariño =

Filipino actor and dancer (born 2002)

- Born: Rogel Kyle Cariño Jr. September 3, 2002 (age 23); General Mariano Alvarez, Cavite, Philippines
- Occupations: Actor; dancer
- Years active: 2009–present
- Agent(s): Star Magic (2009–2020); GMA Network; TV5 Network
- Known for: E-boy
- Spouse: EJ Laure (m. 2025)
- Children: 1

Rogel Kyle "Bugoy" Cariño Jr. (born September 3, 2002) is a Filipino actor and dancer. He joined Star Circle Kid Quest, a television search for young talented kids in 2009, and emerged as the winner. Since then, he has appeared in numerous television shows, films, and endorsed several local brands in the Philippines.

== Early life ==
Rogel Kyle Cariño Jr. was born on September 3, 2002, to a Roman Catholic family in General Mariano Alvarez, Cavite, Philippines.

At the age of 4, Cariño has expressed an interest in dancing. He has joined several dance contests in different barangays, and has been a member of a local hip hop dance crew, Higher Level. This has enabled him to appear in numerous commercials.

== Career ==
In 2009, he joined the third season of ABS-CBN's Star Circle Quest which was hosted by Ai-Ai delas Alas and Ruffa Gutierrez. At the end of the competition, he was proclaimed as the winner of the said search.

After winning the child artist search, he became a regular cast of the award-winning children gag show, Goin' Bulilit. Since then, he has appeared in several shows in ABS-CBN. In 2012, he starred as the main protagonist in E-Boy. He was a talent of the network's Star Magic from 2009 to 2020. He appeared on Wanted: Ang Serye of TV5 in 2021 and Magpakailanman of GMA Network in 2023.

== Filmography ==
=== Film ===
Year	Title	Role	Note(s)
2010	I'll Be There	Pio	
2011	Shake, Rattle & Roll 13	Bikbok	"Tamawo" segment
2012	Alagwa	Bryan Lim	
2014	Eh, Kasi Bata!	Billy	
2015	Angela Markado	Jimmy	
2016	Art Is Kool	Kyle	
2017	Karyn	Coby	
2023	Huling Sayaw	Danilo	
2026	Utoy Story		

=== Television ===
Year	Title	Role
2009	Star Circle Kid Quest: Search for the Kiddie Idol	Himself / Contestant
2009	Pinoy Big Brother	Himself / Judge
2009	Agimat Presents: Tiagong Akyat	Martin Mariano Ronquillo
2009	George and Cecil	Toby Castro
2009	Kulilits	Himself / Host
2009	Pinoy Big Brother: Teen Edition	Himself / Performer
2009–2016	Goin' Bulilit	Himself
2010	Rod Santiago's Agua Bendita	Young Ronnie Aguirre
2010	Kokey @ Ako	Caloy
2010	Imortal	Young Mateo Rodriguez
2011	Wansapanataym: Rod Santiago's Buhawi Jack	Dino Isidro
2011	Happy Yipee Yehey	Himself / Performer
2011	Maalaala Mo Kaya: Internet Shop	Lolong
2011	Pilipinas Got Talent	Himself / Performer
2011	Minsan Lang Kita Iibigin	Jaime Del Tierro Jr.
2011	Maalaala Mo Kaya: Tsinelas	Dagul
2011	Wansapanataym: My Mumu	Louie
2011	Pablo S. Gomez's Mutya	Young Aries
2011	Goin' Bulilit Presents: Dance Upon A Time	Tikboy
2011	100 Days to Heaven	Tikoy
2012	E-Boy	E-boy / Rap Rap
2012	Kris TV	Himself / Guest
2012	Wansapanataym: Bye, Bye Bangungot	Malo
2012	A Beautiful Affair	Ivan
2012	Sarah G. Live	Himself / Guest
2012	Maalaala Mo Kaya: Papag	Young Ben
2012	ASAP 18	ASAP Supahdance Guest/Performer
2013	Wansapanataym: Number One Father & Son	Buster Corazon
2013	Juan dela Cruz	Kyle
2013	Maalaala Mo Kaya: Gown	Young Rubin
2013	Wansapanataym: Finding Nilo	Nilo
2013	Maalaala Mo Kaya: Sapatos	Young Juanito Furugganan
2013	Annaliza	Patrick "Pating / Ting" Mendoza
2013	Wansapanataym: OMG (Oh My Genius)	Edison Tomas
2013	Maalaala Mo Kaya: Bituin	JV
2014	The Legal Wife	Young Jasper
2014	Moon of Desire	Young Jeff
2014	Goin' Bulilit Presents: The Prodigal Son	Luke
2014	Maalaala Mo Kaya: Tutong	Jose
2014	Ipaglaban Mo: Kailan Mo Ako Mapapatawad?	Joshua
2015	Bridges of Love	Young Gabriel "Gael" Nakpil
2015	FlordeLiza	Luke Marquez
2015	All of Me	Young Henry Nieves
2015	You're My Home	Young Ram Fontanilla
2016	Tubig at Langis	Young Tope Magdangal
2016	Maalaala Mo Kaya; Radyo	Young Raymond
2016	Till I Met You	Jomar
2017	Maalaala Mo Kaya: Tahanan	Lorenz
2017	It's Showtime	Himself
2018	Spirits Reawaken	Nato
2019	Ipaglaban Mo: Samantala	
2021	Wanted: Ang Serye	Tony
2023	Magpakailanman	Young Jester

== Accolades ==
=== Awards and nominations ===
Year	Awards	Category	Work	Result	Ref
2015	6th ENPRESS Golden Screen TV Awards	Outstanding Performance by an Actor in Single Program	Maalaala Mo Kaya: Tutong	Nominated	
2015	2nd Paragala Central Luzon Media Awards	Best Male Child Performer	Goin' Bulilit	Won	
2014	28th PMPC Star Awards for TV	Best Comedy Actor	Goin' Bulilit	Nominated	
2013	1st Asean International Film Festival and Awards	Best Supporting Actor	Alagwa	Won	
2013	61st FAMAS Awards	Best Child Actor	Alagwa	Nominated	
2013	29th PMPC Star Awards for Movies	Movie Child Performer of the Year	Alagwa	Won	
2013	44th GMMSF Box-Office Entertainment Awards	Most Popular Male Child Performer		Won	
2012	26th PMPC Star Awards for TV	Best Child Performer	E-Boy	Nominated	
2012	43rd GMMSF Box-Office Entertainment Awards	Most Popular Male Child Performer	100 Days to Heaven	Won	
2012	6th Gawad Genio Awards	Best Film Child Performer	Shake, Rattle & Roll 13"" (Tamawo"" episode)	Won	
2012	28th PMPC Star Awards for Movies	Movie Child Performer of the Year	Shake, Rattle & Roll 13 (Tamawo episode)	Nominated	
2011	37th Metro Manila Film Festival	Best Child Performer	Shake, Rattle & Roll 13 ("Tamawo" episode)	Won	
2010	24th PMPC Star Awards for TV	Best Children Show Host	Kulilits	Nominated	

== Personal life ==
On September 3, 2020 (Bugoy's 18th birthday), his girlfriend Ennajie Laure posted on Instagram pictures of their female baby child Scarlet for the first time. Back in March 2018, Bugoy and EJ denied the pregnancy issue through their social media accounts when Bugoy was only 15 years old at the time and EJ was already 20. Laure and Cariño married in March 2025.
