= Manila Kingpin: The Asiong Salonga Story =

- Theatrical release poster
- Directed by: Tikoy Aguiluz; Gary dela Cruz (uncredited)
- Written by: Roy Iglesias; Rey Ventura
- Produced by: Leonard Villalon
- Starring: Jeorge "E.R." Estregan; Carla Abellana; Phillip Salvador
- Cinematography: Carlo Mendoza
- Edited by: Jason Cahapay; Ryan Orduña; Mirana Medina-Bhunjun
- Music by: Jessie Lasaten
- Production companies: Scenema Concept International; CMB Film Services
- Distributed by: Viva Films
- Release date: December 25, 2011
- Running time: 121 minutes
- Country: Philippines
- Language: Filipino
- Budget: ₱70 million (estimated)
- Box office: ₱38.43 million (as of January 7, 2012 - MMFF season); ₱50 million (4 weeks)

Manila Kingpin: The Untold Story of Asiong Salonga (also marketed as Manila Kingpin: The Asiong Salonga Story) is a 2011 Filipino biographical-crime film directed by Tikoy Aguiluz and Darryl "Gary" dela Cruz and starring Jeorge "E.R." Estregan in the title role, alongside Jeffrey D. Rillo, Carla Abellana, Phillip Salvador, John Regala, Ronnie Lazaro, Baron Geisler, Joko Diaz, Archie Adamos, Yul Servo, Dennis Padilla, and Ketchup Eusebio. Produced by Scenema Concept International, it was released by Viva Films as an entry to the 37th Metro Manila Film Festival, where it won 11 awards, including for Best Picture, Best Director (dela Cruz), and Best Actor (Estregan).

Aguiluz disowned the film before release after the film was reedited by the producers without his permission.

== Plot ==
Manila Kingpin is based on the story of the notorious Tondo, Manila, gang leader Nicasio "Asiong" Salonga whose true-to-life accounts had been portrayed in several movie versions since 1961 (starring Joseph Estrada). It is also the first Filipino major film produced in black-and-white in the 21st century as well as the returning action genre movie.

Manila Kingpin is the replacing entry to the original projects Mr. Wong (starring Robin Padilla) and Hototay (Regal Films, starring Nora Aunor), after the latter two had backed out from the event.

== Cast ==
- Jeorge "E.R." Estregan as Nicasio "Asiong" Salonga
- Carla Abellana as Fidela Fernandez-Salonga
- Phillip Salvador as Sgt. Domingo "Domeng" Salonga
- John Regala as Totoy Golem (Carlos Capistrano)
- Ronnie Lazaro as Boy Zapanta (Ángel Zapanta)
- Baron Geisler as Erning Toothpick (Ernesto Reyes)
- Joko Diaz as Pepeng Hapon
- Archie Adamos as Turong Pajo
- Yul Servo as Bimbo
- Dennis Padilla as Tambol
- Ketchup Eusebio as Kiko
- Ping Medina as Piring
- Gerald Ejercito as Badong
- Amay Bisaya as Ayes Gago

=== Cameos ===
- Roi Vinzon as Viray
- Jay Manalo as Prison Mayor Guardame
- Valerie Concepcion as Mely (Asiong's mistress)
- Jaycee Parker as Fe (Asiong's mistress)
- Paloma Esmeria as Rosing (Asiong's mistress)
- Roldan Aquino as Hepe Villagonzalo
- Robert Arevalo as Cando Salonga
- Perla Bautista as Maria Salonga
- Dante Rivero as Luis Fernandez
- Marissa Sanchez as Carmen
- Jerico Ejercito as young Asiong
- Ely Buendia as Band Lead Singer

== Accolades ==
Award-giving body	Category	Result
37th Metro Manila Film Festival
37th Metro Manila Film Festival	Best Picture	Won
37th Metro Manila Film Festival	Best Festival Supporting Actor	Won, (John Regala)
37th Metro Manila Film Festival	Best Festival Director	Won, ("Gary dela Cruz")
37th Metro Manila Film Festival	Best Editing	Won, (Jason Canapay and Ryan Orduña)
37th Metro Manila Film Festival	Best Festival Original Story	Won, ("Mel del Rosario")
37th Metro Manila Film Festival	Best Festival Screenplay	Won, (Roy Iglesias)
37th Metro Manila Film Festival	Best Festival Original Theme Song	Won, ("La Paloma by Ely Buendia")
37th Metro Manila Film Festival	Best Festival Cinematography	Won, ("Carlo Mendoza")
37th Metro Manila Film Festival	Best Festival Sound Recording	Won, ("Mike Idioma")
37th Metro Manila Film Festival	Best Festival Musical Score	Won, ("Jessie Lazaten")
37th Metro Manila Film Festival	Best Production Design	Won, ("Fritz Siloria, Mona Soriano, and Ronaldo Cadapan")
37th Metro Manila Film Festival	Gatpuno Villegas Cultural Award	Won
37th Metro Manila Film Festival	Best Festival Actor	Nominated
37th Metro Manila Film Festival	Best Festival Visual Effects	Nominated
37th Metro Manila Film Festival	Best Festival Float	Nominated
37th Metro Manila Film Festival	Best Festival Original Story	Nominated
28th PMPC Star Awards	Movie Director of the Year	Won ("Tikoy Aguiluz")
28th PMPC Star Awards	Movie Actor of the Year	Won ("Jeorge Estregan")
28th PMPC Star Awards	Movie Supporting Actor of the Year	Won ("Baron Geisler")
28th PMPC Star Awards	Movie Original Screenplay of the Year	Nominated
28th PMPC Star Awards	Movie Cinematographer of the Year	Won ("Carlo Mendoza")
28th PMPC Star Awards	Movie Editor of the Year	Won ("Jason Canapay & Ryan Orduna")
28th PMPC Star Awards	Movie Production Designer of the Year	Won ("Fritz Silorio, Mona Soriano, Ronaldo Cadapan")
28th PMPC Star Awards	Movie Musical Scorer of the Year	Won ("Jessie Lazaten")
28th PMPC Star Awards	Movie Original Theme Song of the Year	Won ("Hari ng Tondo")
Golden Screen Awards 2012
Golden Screen Awards 2012	Best Performance by an Actor in a Supporting Role-Drama, Musical or Comedy	Nominated ("John Regala")
Golden Screen Awards 2012	Best Cinematographer	Won ("Carlo Mendoza")
Golden Screen Awards 2012	Best Editing	Nominated ("Jason Canapay, Ryan Orduna")
Golden Screen Awards 2012	Best Production Design	Nominated ("Fritz Silorio, Mona Soriano, Ronaldo Cadapan")
Golden Screen Awards 2012	Best Sound	Nominated ("Albert Michael Idioma")
Golden Screen Awards 2012	Best Original Sounds	Nominated ("Albert Michael Idioma")
Gawad Pasado Awards 2012
Gawad Pasado Awards 2012	PINAKAPASADOng Pelikula	Won
Gawad Pasado Awards 2012	PINAKAPASADOng Aktor	Won (Jeorge Estregan)
Gawad Pasado Awards 2012	PINAKAPASADOng Disenyong Pamproduksyon	Won ("Fritz Silonio")
Gawad Pasado Awards 2012	PINAKAPASADOng Paglalapat ng Tunog	Won ("Albert Michael Idioma")
60th FAMAS Awards
60th FAMAS Awards	Best Picture	Won
60th FAMAS Awards	Best Actor	Won (Jeorge Estregan)
60th FAMAS Awards	Best Supporting Actor	Won Baron Geisler
60th FAMAS Awards	Best Editing	Won ("Jason Cahapay, Mirana Medina-Bhunjun, Ryan Orduña")
60th FAMAS Awards	Best Cinematography	Won(Carlo Mendoza)
60th FAMAS Awards	Best Theme Song	Won (Denise Barbacena), Gloc-9
60th FAMAS Awards	Best Screenplay	Won ("Roy Iglesias, Rey Ventura")
60th FAMAS Awards	Best Director	Won ("Tikoy Aguiluz")

== Soundtrack ==
- "La Paloma" by Ely Buendia
- "Hari ng Tondo" by Gloc-9 featuring Denise Barbacena
