= Metro Manila Film Festival Special Awards =

Awards given by Metro Manila Film Festival

- Country: Philippines
- Presented by: MMDA
- Website: www.mmda.gov.ph/mmff/

The following are the Special Awards given by the Metro Manila Film Festival.

== Special awards ==
=== 15th Metro Manila Film Festival ===
- Posthumous award: Vic Silayan
- Special award: D'Wonder Film's Pagputok ng Arawm Babaha ng Dugo sa Irosin

=== 16th Metro Manila Film Festival ===
- Best Dressed Actor: Ricky Belmonte
- Best Dressed Actress: Star Querubin

=== 17th Metro Manila Film Festival ===
- Special Recognition Award: Victoriano Ramos Villanueva (a.k.a. "Torbillano)
- Posthumous award: Carmen Rosales

Robert "Bobby" Talavis
Leroy Salvador Jr.
Lamberto Avellana

=== 18th Metro Manila Film Festival ===
- Special Recognition Award: Joseph Estrada

Joey Lina

- Gawad ng Natatanging Pagkilala: Nora Aunor
- Female Star of the Night: Tetchie Agbayani
- Male Star of the Night: Bernard Bonnin

=== 22nd Metro Manila Film Festival ===
- Star of the Night: Melanie Marquez
- Plaque of Recognition for Winning in the Cairo Film Festival: Nora Aunor

=== 29th Metro Manila Film Festival ===
- People's Choice for Best Picture: Mano Po 2: My Home
- People's Choice for Best Actor: Richard Gomez - Filipinas
- People's Choice for Best Actress: Sharon Cuneta - Crying Ladies

=== 33rd Metro Manila Film Festival ===
- People's Choice for Best Picture: Shake, Rattle & Roll 9
- People's Choice for Best Director: Paul Daza - Shake, Rattle & Roll 9
- People's Choice for Best Float: Shake, Rattle & Roll 9

Resiklo (1st runner-up)
Sakal, Sakali, Saklolo (2nd runner-up)

=== 35th Metro Manila Film Festival ===
- Lifetime Achievement Award: Dolphy
- Posthumous Award for Film Service and Excellence: Esperidion Laxa

=== 37th Metro Manila Film Festival ===
- Lifetime Achievement Award: Eddie Garcia
- Posthumous Award for Film Service and Excellence: Lito Calzado
- Kutis Ganda Award - Male - Ryan Agoncillo
- Kutis Ganda Award - Female - Ai Ai delas Alas
- Male Sexiest Appeal Celebrity of the Night - ER Ejercito
- Female Sexiest Appeal Celebrity of the Night - Judy Ann Santos
- Ellen Lising Male Face of the Night - Richard Gomez
- Ellen Lising Female Face of the Night - Iza Calzado

=== 40th Metro Manila Film Festival ===
- Youth Choice Award: Bonifacio: Ang Unang Pangulo
- Commemorative Award for Vision and Leadership: Joseph Estrada
- Special MMFF 40th Year Award: Francis Tolentino
- Special Recognition Award (posthumous): Guillermo de Vega; accepted by wife Maria de Vega
- Face of the Night: Nadine Lustre
