= Asia Pacific Film Institute =

Film school in the Philippines

Asia Pacific Film Institute (APFi)
- Type: Private film school
- Established: 2004
- Parent institution: Briggs R. Yalung
- Location: YDG Bldg. Blue Ridge Katipunan Ave. Project 4, Quezon City, Philippines
- Website: facebook.com/iamapfi

The Asia Pacific Film Institute is a film school in the Philippines.

It is the first independently run and self-supporting film school in the country. It offers full educational services and training facilities in classic and modern filmmaking with neither funding nor alliance from any college, university, agency or film association.

== Accreditation ==
The institute is accredited as a technical and vocational postsecondary institution by the Technical Education and Skills Development Authority (TESDA) of the Philippines.

=== Film Development Council of the Philippines ===
The institute is also now part of the Academic Film Society (AFS), led by the FDCP Filipino Development Council of the Philippines, joining a community dedicated to film education. This partnership opens new opportunities for students to expand their cinematic knowledge and skills.

== Programs ==
The film school offers comprehensive filmmaking programs and short training courses in allied fields.

=== 6-Month Diploma Program Motion Picture Production ===
The following courses are offered across three consecutive terms, with the third term culminating in a final thesis.

First Term:

- Directing 101
- Scriptwriting 101
- Cinematography 101
- Production Design
- Production Management
- Editing 101

Second Term:

- Directing 201
- Scriptwriting 201
- Cinematography 201
- Editing 201

Third Term:

- Thesis - Individual; 15-20 minute short film using a 35mm or HD camera
- Visual Effects
- Sound

WORKSHOPS are under UFO WORKSHOPS (formally referred to as À La Carte courses) for those unable to dedicate time towards the 6-month comprehensive filmmaking program.

=== APFI Launches the School of Digital Arts (APFI-SDA) ===
Following the reopening of the Asia Pacific Film Institute (APFI) at its new location, the institution introduces the School of Digital Arts (APFI-SDA).

APFI-SDA will initially offer photography and videography workshops, with plans to introduce graphic design, web design, and diploma programs in the coming months. Leading the program is Jijo de Guzman.

=== APFI À La Carte Program: Flexible Filmmaking Education for Working Professionals ===
The Asia Pacific Film Institute (APFI) introduces its À La Carte Program, designed for aspiring filmmakers balancing work and education.

=== APFI’s Full Motion Picture Production Program: A Comprehensive Pathway to Filmmaking ===
The Asia Pacific Film Institute (APFI) offers a 6-month Full Motion Picture Production Program. Covering key disciplines such as screenwriting, cinematography, editing, and directing, this program provides an immersive foundation for those looking to enter the film industry.

PHASE 1: Film Appreciation - Production Management - Film Editing - Sound Design - Phase 1 Finals

PHASE 2: Scriptwriting - Acting - Production Design - Cinematography - Phase 2 Finals

PHASE 3: Producing - Directing Actors - Directing - Phase 3 Finals - Thesis

== Faculty ==
The institute draws its faculty from experienced professionals in the film industry.

- Celso Ad Castillo - Resident Director, Directing/Scriptwriting
- Reginald Vinluan - Visual Effects
- Manny Morfe - Professor, Production Design
- Boy Vinarao - Professor, Directing/Editing(Linear)
- Robert Quebral - Professor, Cinematography 35mm
- Nap Jamir - Professor, Cinematography
- Jade Castro - Professor, Scriptwriting/Directing
- Raymond Lee - ScriptWriting
- Emman Dela Cruz - Directing/Directing Actors
- Edber Mamisao - Directing
- JD Domingo - Editing
- Mads Adrias - Production Management

NEW FACULTY MEMBERS:

- Gian Caluag - Advanced Cinematography
- Angeli Bayani - Acting Class
- John Bedia - Scriptwriting
- Siege Ledesma - Directing
- Dino Placino - Cinematographer
- JD Domingo - Film Editor
- Marielle Hizon - Production Designer
- Jet Leyco - Film Appreciation
