= Shake, Rattle & Roll 13 =

2011 Filipino film

- Theatrical release poster
- Directed by: Richard V. Somes (segment "Tamawo"); Jerrold Tarog (segment "Parola"); Chris Martinez (segment "Rain Rain Go Away")
- Screenplay by: Aloy Adlawan (segments "Tamawo" and "Parola"); Jules Katanyag (segment "Tamawo"); Jerrold Tarog (segment "Parola"); Maribel Ilag (segment "Parola"); Roselle Y. Monteverde (segment "Parola"); Jerry Gracio (segment "Rain Rain Go Away")
- Story by: Richard V. Somes (segment "Tamawo"); Aloy Adlawan (segments "Tamawo" and "Parola"); Jerrold Tarog (segment "Parola"); Maribel Ilag (segment "Parola"); Roselle Y. Monteverde (segment "Parola"); Chris Martinez (segment "Rain Rain Go Away"); Marlon Rivera (segment "Rain Rain Go Away")
- Produced by: Roselle Monteverde-Teo
- Starring: Eugene Domingo; Zanjoe Marudo; Maricar Reyes; Kathryn Bernardo; Sam Concepcion; Edgar Allan Guzman; Louise delos Reyes; Celia Rodriguez; Boots Anson-Roa; Jay Manalo; Ara Mina; Dimples Romana; Ervic Vijandre
- Cinematography: Alex Espartero (segment "Tamawo"); Pong Ignacio (segment "Parola"); Gary Gardoce (segment "Rain Rain Go Away")
- Edited by: Renewin Alano
- Music by: Alfred "Dodoy" Ongleo (segment "Tamawo"); Jerrold Tarog (segment "Parola"); Teresa Barrozo (segment "Rain Rain Go Away")
- Production companies: Regal Entertainment; Regal Multimedia Inc.
- Release date: December 25, 2011
- Running time: 147 minutes
- Country: Philippines
- Language: Filipino

Shake, Rattle & Roll 13 (titled onscreen as Shake Rattle Roll 13) is a 2011 Filipino horror anthology film produced by Regal Entertainment, and the thirteenth installment of the Shake, Rattle & Roll film series, following the twelfth film in 2010. It is directed by Richard V. Somes, Jerrold Tarog and Chris Martinez, and was an official entry to the 2011 Metro Manila Film Festival. It stars an ensemble cast including Eugene Domingo, Zanjoe Marudo, Maricar Reyes, Kathryn Bernardo, Sam Concepcion, Edgar Allan Guzman, Louise delos Reyes, Celia Rodriguez, Boots Anson-Roa, Jay Manalo, Ara Mina, Dimples Romana, and Ervic Vijandre.

The film consists of three stories: a family is hunted by elf-like creatures after their egg is stolen; two friends are possessed by rival witches from an old lighthouse; and a couple is haunted by the ghosts of drowned factory workers.

The film was initially intended to be the final installment of the series; however, director Chito S. Roño expressed interest in reviving it. This led to the release of the fourteenth installment, Shake, Rattle and Roll Fourteen: The Invasion, in 2012.

== Plot ==
=== "Tamawo" ===
An old man Lando buries something under his house. When he is finished, he encounters a group of white-skinned people. The chieftain demands Lando to return something that belongs to them which he refuses. Angered, he and his tribesmen savagely kill him. Afterwards, Lando's discontented nephew Allan moves into his house with his blind wife Isay, their infant son and his stepson Bikbok. The next day, Allan discovers the object buried by Lando, which turns out to be a crystalline egg. At night, Bikbok notices the white creatures watching him.

The next day, Allan's cousin Pey takes Isay, Allan and Bikbok to Aling Epang to treat their baby. As Bikbok collects water, he sees a group of sparks and follows it. At a waterfall, he is captured by the creatures, whose chieftain tells him to give back a stolen item, but Bikbok denies knowledge of it. The chieftain tells him that if he does not return it otherwise on the third day at night when the new moon arrives, he and his family will be in danger. Bikbok runs to Aling Epang for help and tells her what he saw. Epang realizes the white creatures are the Tamawos, a group of fairies who take away people. Epang tells him that he needs to find out what they have stolen because the tamawos will never stop until it is returned. Meanwhile, Pey is killed by the tamawos when he encounters them at the forest. At night, Bikbok and his family are attacked by the tamawos with Allan having his foot injured in the process.

After Epang heals his injury, Bikbok tries to tell him his story but Allan distrusts him. Allan walks to the forest and finds Pey's mutilated body. Horrified, they decide to leave. When Bikbok enters Allan's room, he finds the crystalline egg with a baby inside, realizing it is the object that the tamawos were looking for. The next day, Allan decides to take revenge on the people who killed Pey when the ranch owner blames him on the incident. He returns to the house but finds the egg missing.

When Isay tells Bikbok that he stole it, Allan threatens Bikbok but Isay hits him to protect her son. When Allan threatens Isay, she urges Bikbok to escape. He grabs the egg and runs off but Allan chases after him. Meanwhile, the tamawos capture Isay and the baby. Bikbok tries to return the egg, but Allan finds him and attempts to grab the egg. After a struggle, Allan throws the egg and breaks it as the tamawos watch. Allan runs off and is pursued by the tamawos, who are enraged at seeing their baby killed. At the cave, Isay finds her baby as the tamawos arrive. Allan arrives at the cave and fights the tamawos. They try to escape but the tamawos corner them and kill Allan as he begs for mercy in revenge for the egg.

With the tamawos about to take Isay, Bikbok runs to them and begs for them to take him instead. The tamawos accept his request. Bikbok bids farewell to his mother, and Isay cries in anguish as Epang arrives and watches him get entering the cave with the tamawos.

=== "Parola" ===
Best friends Lucy and Shane camp in a beach for a school report. At night, Shane is at the gate of a nearby lighthouse with Lucy's ex-boyfriend Bryan and talks to him about Lucy's promise to him. She wants to go inside the lighthouse but Bryan refuses her to get in, claiming it is restricted. Lucy arrives and Shane convinces her to go to the lighthouse. A guard, Andoy warns them to go down but Lucy and Shane ignore him. The lighthouse turns on. Andoy runs inside and tries to get them as the girls each see two ghosts. Horrified, they attempt to leave as Andoy arrives, startling them and causing them to nearly fall from the lighthouse before he catches them. When he attempts to pull them up, the two ghosts walk towards them, causing the girls and Andoy to fall down.

Lucy and Shane are injured but survive. Shane gets out of her room to see Lucy. Shane arrives at Lucy's room before Lucy's mother Angelie asks her mother Beth to leave. Before the girls leave, the ghosts from the lighthouse began to follow them. Lucy asks her mother why she is mad towards Beth until she tells her that she learned that Beth, a trusted friend, had an affair with her husband Norman and tells her to stay away from Shane. Afterwards, the ghosts torment Lucy and Shane to break their friendship.

At school, the girls began to quarrel each other over their families. After the ghosts torment the girls, their tensions grow further when Shane has her hand burned with a gas burner at a laboratory and Lucy hexes a girl who had been bullying her. Meanwhile, the parents' problems grow further: Shane catches her mother talking to Norman where his wife forces him to leave which devastates her and Lucy. Shane tries to call Lucy and talk to her on the incident at the lighthouse earlier but Lucy refuses. Suddenly, the ghosts appear and continue tormenting them. The next day, Lucy catches Shane embraced by Bryan which causes her to break their friendship. Meanwhile, Norman appears and tries to take Beth with him but she tells him to leave. Outraged, he tries to grab her but Shane injures Norman by the ghost's powers.

During class discussion, Bryan tells the story about the lighthouse in the Spanish era which was built at the site where the two rival witches Rowana and Cornelia died. Rowana tried to apprehend Cornelia, who killed her family, prompting Rowana to kill Cornelia's family in revenge. The witches encountered each other and fought each other with their spells. During their fight, Cornelia summoned a lightning storm, killing Rowana and herself. After the lighthouse was built, people were barred from entering the lighthouse because every year during their death anniversary, their ghosts would awaken and claim the lives of two people who entered the lighthouse to relive their rivalry. Shane overhears this and begins to leave. Meanwhile, at the hospital, Norman has a medical condition until Lucy realizes this and leaves the hospital as well. She arrives at Shane's house and attacks Beth. Shane arrives at the house and finds her mother near death. She finds Lucy and begins to fight. When Shane is about to kill Lucy, Angelie arrives and knocks Shane unconscious. She tries to help her daughter but she disappears along with Shane. The girls are at the lighthouse and the witches' souls possess them. The girls face each other and continue their fight. After they struggle, the girls' consciousness recover from their trance. They began to apologize to each other and promised that they will never be apart, thus reliving their friendship. But when Rowana and Cornelia's souls are still fighting, Lucy and Shane are struck by lightning and die in the lighthouse.

After 6 months, Norman and Angelie reconcile. Afterwards, Norman returns to Beth who has recently given birth to twins. Angelie arrives to take one of the twins as part of their settlement. The camera zooms into the ultrasound while Lucy and Shane are heard declaring their everlasting friendship, implying the twins to be the reincarnations of Lucy and Shane.

=== "Rain Rain Go Away" ===
During the wrath of Typhoon Ondoy, Cynthia and her family are forced to leave when their house and their factory gets flooded. Cynthia goes into labor and is rushed by her husband Mar to the hospital. A news report features Marikina where child laborers died at the factory.

A year later, Cynthia and Mar move into a condominium and are expecting another baby after their child died from miscarriage during Ondoy. After working at their new plastic factory, Mar's brother Nante brings Cynthia back to the condominium to cook dinner. It rains before they leave and Cynthia, due to the typhoon, has developed aquaphobia. At the parking lot, Cynthia leaves Nante and returns to the condominium. While Nante is at the parking lot, water pours out of his car. He attempts to escape but the water fills up his car and drowns him. The police question the family about Nante's death. As Cynthia is sleeping, she sees Nante's body floating in the coffin before she wakes up.

The next day, Cynthia meets a wealthy couple planning to buy an old factory and tours them around the place. While there, the man finds the warehouse locked. Later, after Cynthia collects her allowance, she encounters an old woman who returns a donation and warns her. Cynthia was horrified and collapses. After recovering at the hospital, she notices a group of children drawing an eye while singing "Rain Rain Go Away" and returns to the condominium. Cynthia has another nightmare involving Mar. She wakes up and Mar is nearly drowned while sleeping. After Mar arrives, Cynthia tells him about her nightmare and the tragedy from the typhoon earlier which Mar disbelieves. That night, Cynthia, Mar, his mother Maritess, and their maid Dina arrive at the factory with a priest to bless it. After the priest leaves, the old woman, whom Cynthia encountered earlier, watches her.

Cynthia notices the old lady talking to Dina. Before leaving, Cynthia questions Dina about what the old lady said. Dina replied that the lady said that she remembered what happened to her father earlier, whom she failed to save from a fire, revealing that the dead will never rest if nobody saves them. Meanwhile, Mar, who is returning to the condominium, drowns in an elevator. Cynthia escapes from her flooded bathroom and encounters a group of ghosts. Horrified, she escapes to an elevator where she finds Mar's corpse. As Cynthia mourns his death, she gives birth to a healthy baby.

At the hospital, both Cynthia and Maritess express guilt about the child laborers who died during the typhoon, revealing that they were responsible for locking them in and abandoning them to drown after their shift. Their spirits began to haunt them by killing each of the family members through water. As Maritess leaves the hospital, she notices children drawing an eye in the middle of the road before being killed by a truck carrying mineral water. After selling their new factory, Cynthia gives the donation back to the old woman but the lady refuses because her grandchildren, who turn out to be the ghosts, had been working to help her grandmother. Cynthia begs the lady to accept it so that she could leave at peace with her child, which the old lady accepts.

Before leaving, Cynthia returns to the factory and enters the warehouse to pay respects to the deceased youth workers when suddenly she hears the children singing and becomes drenched in rain. Cynthia is initially scared, but silently accepts her fate, as the waters rise inside the locked-down warehouse where the drowned ghosts are. The last scene shows the glimpse of the ghosts.

== Cast ==
=== Tamawo ===
- Zanjoe Marudo as Allan
- Maricar Reyes as Isay
- Bugoy Cariño as Bikbok
- Celia Rodriguez as Aling Epang
- Ervic Vijandre as Pey
- Ronnie Lazaro as Lando
- Rez Cortez as Ranchero
- Manu Raspal as Father Tamawo
- Ryndon Leonard Claver as Mother Tamawo

=== Parola ===
- Kathryn Bernardo as Lucy
- Louise delos Reyes as Shane
- Sam Concepcion as Bryan
- Hiro Peralta as Andoy
- Dimples Romana as Rowana
- Julia Clarete as Cornelia
- Ara Mina as Beth
- Ina Raymundo as Angelie
- Lloyd Samartino as Norman
- Lui Villaruz as Class Adviser
- Richard Quan as Husband of Cornelia
- Maurice Mabutas as Daughter of Cornelia
- Katrina Napigkit as Cornelia's double
- Laiza Lambino as Mean Girl 1
- Queenie Santiago as Mean Girl 2

=== Rain Rain Go Away ===
- Eugene Domingo as Cynthia Gomez
- Jay Manalo as Mar Gomez
- Edgar Allan Guzman as Nante Gomez
- Boots Anson-Roa as Maritess Gomez
- Perla Bautista as Old Woman
- Tess Antonio as Dina
- Dexter Doria as Mrs. Reyes
- Fonz Deza as Mr. Reyes
- Rollie Innocencio as Priest
- Jeffrey Cantuba as Priest Assistant
- Ria Garcia as Ghost 1
- Dylan Ray Talon as Ghost 2
- Jerick Bodota as Ghost 3
- Nathaniel Britt as Street Kid 1
- Nicolette Flordeliza as Street Kid 2
- Marioneth Ordonez as Street Kid 3

== Reception ==
=== Critical response ===
The film has been graded with an "A" by the Cinema Evaluation Board of the Philippines.

In a review for ClickTheCity.com, Philbert Ortiz Dy described the film as a worthy anthology rating it with 4 out of a possible 5 stars. The film serves as a nice showcase of local talent and the 'Parola' episode itself is "worth the price of admission." Its weaknesses include the overall length and unevenness in regards to the two other episodes paling in comparison with Parola's quality and impact.

However, PEP.ph's Abby Mendoza was more appreciative of the film pointing out how unique the storytelling elements, themes and performances of each episode made Shake, Rattle & Roll 13 a film that does "more than creep one out."

== Accolades ==
Year	Award giving body	Category	Recipient	Result
2011	Metro Manila Film Festival	Third Best Picture	Shake, Rattle & Roll 13	Won
2011	Metro Manila Film Festival	Best Actress	Eugene Domingo	Nominated
2011	Metro Manila Film Festival	Best Actress	Maricar Reyes	Nominated
2011	Metro Manila Film Festival	Best Child Performer	Bugoy Carino	Won
2011	Metro Manila Film Festival	Best Original Story	Chris Martinez and Marlon Rivera ("Rain Rain Go Away" episode)	Won

== See also ==
- Shake, Rattle & Roll (film series)
- List of ghost films

== Notes ==
- The word "Tamawo" is very much close to "Maligno" (a Tagalog word which means monstrous, or eerie creature); an Ilonggo word.
