= Enteng ng Ina Mo =

- Theatrical movie poster
- Directed by: Tony Y. Reyes
- Screenplay by: Danno Kristoper C. Mariquit
- Story by: Danno Kristoper C. Mariquit; Lawrence Nicodemus
- Based on: Okay Ka, Fairy Ko!; Ang Tanging Ina
- Produced by: Charo Santos-Concio; Malou N. Santos; Orlando R. Ilacad; Antonio P. Tuviera; Marvic Sotto; Martina Eileen H. delas Alas
- Starring: Vic Sotto; Ai-Ai delas Alas
- Cinematography: Gary Gardoce
- Edited by: Charliebebs Gohetia
- Music by: Jessie Lasaten
- Production companies: ABS-CBN Film Productions, Inc.; OctoArts Films; APT Entertainment; M-Zet Productions
- Distributed by: Star Cinema
- Release date: December 25, 2011
- Running time: 110 minutes
- Country: Philippines
- Language: Filipino
- Budget: ₱60,000,000.00
- Box office: ₱237,879,178.00; (Official 2011 MMFF run): ₱272,000,000 (US$5,400,000); (Official Domestic Run)

Enteng ng Ina Mo (lit. 'Your Mother's Enteng') is a 2011 Filipino fantasy comedy and action film starring Vic Sotto and Ai-Ai delas Alas. It is a joint production by Star Cinema, M-Zet Productions, APT Entertainment and OctoArts Films and is a cross-over to the Enteng Kabisote and Tanging Ina series. It is an official entry to the 2011 Metro Manila Film Festival and was released on December 25, 2011.

The movie is the last installment of Ang Tanging Ina film series and the eighth movie installment based on the sitcom, Okay Ka, Fairy Ko!. Additionally, this is the only Enteng Kabisote film that was co-produced by ABS-CBN, the same network who previously aired the series way back in 1989 to 1995 season.

== Synopsis ==
Enteng Kabisote wants to retire as the perennial hero of Engkantasya and have a normal life with his family without the magical elements. Ina Montecillo longs to have the right partner to be with her for the rest of her life.

One day, Enteng is placed under a powerful evil spell by The Queen of Darkness, Satana to fall in love with another woman. And when he meets Ina, he exerts all the effort Ina to fall for him. Ina, on the other hand, slowly opens her heart for this new opportunity of love.

Enteng then tries his best to be a father to Ina's children even if they are not fully supportive of him. But when their relationship gets serious, Ina discovers that Enteng already has a family.

After discovering the truth of Enteng's family and the evil spell cast upon Enteng was worn off, Ina's family teamed up with Enteng's family to fight off Satana and her minions for what she had done as Ina Magenta gives Ina Montecillo some of their powers to fight her.

After defeating Satana as they celebrate their victory, both Enteng and Ina set their differences and became friends. However at the arrival of both Tirso "Pip" Montecillo and Aiza Kabisote, both Enteng and Ina scold them for being late midnight New Year Eve. To their shock, they learn that Pip accidentally impregnated Aiza was pregnant during their schedules in late nights (The same scene where Pip accidentally impregnates the woman he did not met while in a drunken state and had a daughter named Monay) and Monay she have second mother and new baby brother or sister and both were comically shocked that they will become grandparents to Aiza's unborn child making themselves as both father and mother in-law to both Aiza and Pip do it Together have families.

== Cast ==
=== Kabisote family ===
- Vic Sotto as Enteng Kabisote
- Gwen Zamora as Faye Kabisote
- Aiza Seguerra as Aiza Kabisote
- Oyo Boy Sotto as Benok Kabisote
- Mikylla Ramirez as Ada Kabisote
- Amy Perez as Ina Magenta (Reyna ng Engkantasya)
- Ruby Rodriguez as Amy
- Jose Manalo as Jose
- Wally Bayola as Bogart

=== Montecillo family ===
- Ai-Ai delas Alas as Ina Montecillo
- Marvin Agustin as Juan Montecillo (Ina Motecillo Eldest's Son)
- Nikki Valdez as Getrudis "Tudis" Montecillo (Ina Motecillo second Eldest's daughter)
- Carlo Aquino as Dimitri "Tri" Montecillo
- Alwyn Uytingco as Tirso "Pip" Montecillo
- Xyriel Manabat as Monay Montecillo
- Eugene Domingo as Rowena (special participation)
- Owie Boy Gapuz as Oogie Boy Montecillo
- Jon Avila as Frank
- Heart Evangelista as Portia "Por" Montecillo (mentioned only)
- Cherry Pie Picache as Ren Constantino (mentioned only)
- Empoy Marquez as William (Seven's husband)
- Cecil Paz as Malena
- Shaina Magdayao as Severina "Seven" Montecillo (mentioned only)
- Erika Padilla as Nora, Pip's Ex-partner, Mother of Monay Montecillo

=== Supporting cast ===
- Megan Young as Ina Azul (Reyna Ina Magenta's sister)
- Precious Lara Quigaman as Ina Verde (Reyna Ina Magenta's sister)
- Bing Loyzaga as Satana/Ina Amarillo (late Reyna Ina Magenta's sister)
- Fritz Ynfante as Doctor Fairy
- Gerard Acao as Mariahouit
- Thou Reyes as Danolla
- Ciara Sotto as Trainor Fairy
- Gian Sotto as Trainor Fairy
- Wahoo Sotto as Trainor Fairy
- Janice Hung as Trainor Fairy
- Jerome Calica as Trainor Fairy
- Paolo Ballesteros as Gay Lover

== Awards ==
Year	Award-giving body	Category	Recipient	Result
2011	Metro Manila Film Festival	Second Best Picture	Enteng ng Ina Mo	Won
2011	Metro Manila Film Festival	Kutis Ganda Award - Female	Ai Ai delas Alas	Won
2011	Metro Manila Film Festival	2nd runner-up for Best Float	Enteng ng Ina Mo	Won
2011	Metro Manila Film Festival	Best Make-Up	Florencia Penero, Niccolo Medina, and Jayvee Flores	Won
2012	GMMSF Box-Office Entertainment Awards	Box-Office Tandem	Vic Sotto and Ai Ai delas Alas	Won

== Release ==
=== Box office ===
The film captured the number one spot on the first day of 2011 Metro Manila Film Festival box office race with a whooping ₱38.5 million gross well ahead of the runners-up, Ang Panday 2 and Segunda Mano with ₱20 million and ₱18.25 million gross respectively.

During its opening day, the film grossed over ₱38.5 million nationwide making it as the highest-grossing film on its first day of all-time in the Philippines breaking the records of Spider-Man and Avatar. On its second day, the movie total gross is ₱69 million. It is higher than Ang Panday 2, with ₱38 million and Segunda Mano with ₱35 million. On its third day, (according to MMFF committee) Enteng ng Ina Mo grossed 91.9 million. Enteng ng Ina Mo breaks the 4-day record of The Unkabogable Praybeyt Benjamin (₱109 million) with a record of ₱110 million. After 4 weeks of showing, the film grossed P 237 million and became the third highest-grossing Filipino film of all time and highest-grossing MMFF film of all time.

=== Reception ===
The film was graded "B" by the Cinema Evaluation Board of the Philippines.

Antonio Siegfrid O. Alegado of Business World described that the film could have been better had it not been hampered by poor editing as it was clear that the fusion of the families of Enteng and Ina was done in rather sloppy fashion. The film, however, was saved by the Tanging Ina cast due to their portrayals.

Mark Angelo Ching of PEP.ph gave the film a stronger review and described it as "the perfect mix of humor and fantasy that MMFF moviegoers look for year after year." The review also noted the performances of Gwen Zamora, Xyriel Manabat, and Thou Reyes.

In regards to the film's concept of doing a cinematic crossover of two established characters, Philbert Ortiz Dy stated that "filmmakers were content to just have the two big stars together on screen, giving them dialogue from other movies and pushing towards some ridiculous adventure climax".
