= Ang Panday 2 =

- Film poster
- Directed by: Mac Alejandre
- Screenplay by: RJ Nuevas
- Story by: Carlo J. Caparas; RJ Nuevas
- Based on: Ang Panday (comics) by: Ang Panday; Carlo J. Caparas and Steve Gan
- Produced by: Jose Mari Abacan; Andrea Bautista Ynares; Rowena Bautista Mendiola
- Starring: Ramon "Bong" Revilla Jr.; Marian Rivera; Phillip Salvador
- Cinematography: Toto Uy
- Edited by: Chrisel G. Desuasido
- Music by: Von De Guzman
- Production companies: Imus Productions; GMA Pictures
- Distributed by: GMA Pictures
- Release date: December 25, 2011
- Running time: 115 minutes
- Country: Philippines
- Language: Filipino
- Box office: 105 million

Ang Panday 2 (lit. 'The Blacksmith 2'), also known as Panday Ang Ikalawang Yugto (lit. 'Blacksmith The Second Stage') is a 2011 Filipino action fantasy film directed by Mac Alejandre. Starring Ramon 'Bong' Revilla Jr., Marian Rivera, Phillip Salvador, and Eddie Garcia, the film was entered in the 2011 Metro Manila Film Festival (MMFF). It was released in theaters nationwide on December 25, 2011, by GMA Pictures and Imus Productions.

== Cast ==
Main cast

- Ramon 'Bong' Revilla Jr. as Flavio/Panday
- Marian Rivera as Arlana/Bagwis
- Phillip Salvador as Lizardo

Supporting cast

- Eddie Garcia as Daluyong
- Iza Calzado as Maria
- Rhian Ramos as Emelita
- Alden Richards as Hubli
- Kris Bernal as Alira Naswen
- Lorna Tolentino as Baruha
- Alice Dixson as Ibira
- Robert Villar as Bugoy
- Benjie Paras as Alulod
- Lucy Torres-Gomez as Ina Engkantada
- Joonee Gamboa as Lolo Isko
- Mark Lapid as Kapitan
- Sheena Halili
- Yogo Singh
- Bea Binene
- Jake Vargas
- Barbie Forteza
- Alyssa Alano
- King Gutierrez
- Mon Confiado as Taumbayan
- Ana Feleo
- Amay Bisaya
- Len-Len Frial as Gelay

== Release ==
=== Box office ===
Ang Panday 2 earned ₱29 million on its opening day. By January 9, 2012, it was the third-highest earning film with 105 million pesos movie gross at the 37th MMFF, after Enteng ng Ina Mo and Segunda Mano.

== Accolades ==
Year	Group	Category	Name	Result
2011	Metro Manila Film Festival	Best Actor	Bong Revilla	Nominated
2011	Metro Manila Film Festival	Best Supporting Actor	Phillip Salvador	Nominated
2011	Metro Manila Film Festival	Best Visual Effects	Riot Incorporated	Won
2011	Metro Manila Film Festival	Best Float	Ang Panday 2	Won
