= Segunda Mano =

- Theatrical release poster
- Directed by: Bb. Joyce Bernal
- Written by: Joel Mercado
- Produced by: Tess V. Fuentes (supervising); John Paul E. Abellera (creative)
- Starring: Kris Aquino; Dingdong Dantes; Angelica Panganiban; Helen Gamboa
- Cinematography: Charlie S. Peralta
- Edited by: Joyce Bernal; Marya Ignacio
- Music by: Carmina R. Cuya
- Production companies: Star Cinema; AgostoDos Pictures; MJM Productions
- Distributed by: Star Cinema
- Release date: December 25, 2011
- Running time: 107 minutes
- Country: Philippines
- Languages: Filipino; English
- Budget: ₱30 million
- Box office: ₱126.6 million (as of January 7, 2012 - MMFF season); ₱138.7 million (4 weeks)

Segunda Mano (lit. 'Second Hand') is a 2011 Filipino supernatural horror film directed by Joyce Bernal, and starring Kris Aquino, Dingdong Dantes, and Angelica Panganiban. The film was produced and released by Star Cinema with the co-production of AgostoDos Pictures, and MJM Productions. It is also an official entry to the 2011 Metro Manila Film Festival.

The film was nominated for 16 FAMAS Awards, including Best Picture, Best Director, Best Actor for Dantes and Best Actress for Aquino, and won one award: Best Supporting Actress for Panganiban.

== Plot ==
Owen and Mariella fight in a car by a lake. Owen has left his wife to be with Mariella, and is angry that Mariella is not willing to make the same sacrifice. The fight turns violent and Mariella tries to escape from the car. The scene cuts to a flashback.

Mariella tells her husband, Ivan, that her best friend, Samantha needs company and drives off. Later, it is revealed that Mariella is dead.

Mabel owns an antique store. She is the only child of her mother, Adela. It is revealed that Mabel's sister, Marie, was lost in an accident when they were children. Marie's ghost haunts their home on the anniversary of her loss. One rainy day, Ivan meets Mabel and they begin a relationship. A year later, Ivan proposes. His daughter with Mariella, Angel, greets Mabel icily. Meanwhile, Samantha begins expressing her interest in Ivan, who does not reciprocate her feelings.

Mariella's ghost begins haunting Mabel. Upon advice from Mabel's best friend, Anna, Mabel unknowingly buys Mariella's red bag but throws it out when she realizes its provenance. Anna's boyfriend, Dindo, sees Mariella's ghost. Samantha apparently jumps out her window after seeing Mariella's ghost. Ivan and Mabel argue after Mabel tells him she has been seeing Mariella's ghost. Angel and Mabel finally reconcile. Mabel and Anna turn to a medium, Manang Letty, for advice. At a séance, Mabel is told Mariella's soul has been released and the only way to set her free is to leave the red bag in church. However, an old lady sleeping inside the church takes the bag and leaves; the bag starts bleeding. Dindo sees Mariella's ghost again, and is killed. Mabel confronts Ivan, who thinks Mabel is leaving him for Dindo. Ivan turns violent, and Mabel ends the relationship.

Mabel takes Mariella's car to show Ivan as proof of the haunting. Mariella takes control and takes Mabel to the lake, revealing that it is Ivan who assaulted her at the beginning of the film, not Owen. Ivan then killed Mariella and ran the car, with Mariella in it, into the bottom of the lake. Ivan calls and tells Mabel that Adela is with him. Mabel goes to save her mother. It is revealed that Ivan killed Owen, Mariella, Dindo, and Samantha. Mariella's ghost appeared to Dindo and Samantha just before Ivan was to kill them. Mabel and Ivan fight but Ivan overpowers her and throws her limp body into the pool. As Adela lies injured, Marie appears to Adela, and morphs into Mariella. On the home CCTV, Ivan notices Mariella bringing Mabel to safety, and Mabel knocks Ivan into the pool. Mariella grabs Ivan to drown him.

Mariella's car is retrieved from the river, and Adela expresses relief at learning that Marie had led a good life and that her soul is at peace. Later, Ivan's ghost begins to haunt Mabel.

== Cast ==
- Kris Aquino as Mabel Domingo
- Dingdong Dantes as Ivan Martinez
- Angelica Panganiban as Mariella "Marie" Domingo-Martinez
- Helen Gamboa as Adela Domingo
- Jhong Hilario as Dindo
- Bangs Garcia as Anna
- Angel Jacob as young Adela
- Noel Colet as Ramon
- Mosang as Manang Letty
- Bettina Carlos as Samantha
- Ian Veneracion as Ivan's father
- Rico Blanco as Owen
- Sofia Millares as Angel
- Lani Tapia as Yaya Flora
- Idda Yaneza as Manang Cely
- Erika Padilla as Ivan's stepmother
- Zeppy Borromeo as House driver
- Sharlene San Pedro as young Mabel
- Ma. Veda Inoval as young Mariela/Marie
- Kristoff Meneses as young Ivan
- Miguel Chavez as Ferdz
- Ericka Villongco as Sheila
- Guji Lorenzana as Ivan's friend
- Archie Alemania as Ivan's friend
- Geraldine M. Villamil as Dindo's wife
- Lilia Cuntapay as church caretaker

== Production ==
Under director Joyce Bernal, Irene Villamor served as assistant director, Barry Gonzales served as 2nd assistant director, and Antoinette Jadaone served as script continuity supervisor.

== Release ==
=== Reception ===
Segunda Mano is in line of Kris Aquino's box-office hits under the horror genre, following her previous film co-starring Diether Ocampo under Star Cinema entitled Dalaw. The film has been graded with an "A" by the Cinema Evaluation Board of the Philippines.

== Accolades ==
Year	Award-giving body	Category	Recipient	Result
2011	Metro Manila Film Festival	Best Actor	Dingdong Dantes	Won
2011	Metro Manila Film Festival	Gatpuno Antonio J. Villegas Cultural Awards	Segunda Mano	Nominated
2011	Metro Manila Film Festival	Best Child Performer	Sofia Millares	Nominated
2011	Metro Manila Film Festival	Best Sound Recording		Nominated
2012	28th PMPC Star Awards for Movies	Movie Actor of the Year	Dingdong Dantes	Nominated
2012	28th PMPC Star Awards for Movies	Movie Supporting Actress of the Year	Angelica Panganiban	Nominated
2012	28th PMPC Star Awards for Movies	Movie Sound Engineer of the Year	Aurel Claro Bilbao	Nominated
2012	60th FAMAS Awards	Best Picture	Segunda Mano	Nominated
2012	60th FAMAS Awards	Best Director	Joyce Bernal	Nominated
2012	60th FAMAS Awards	Best Actor	Dingdong Dantes	Nominated
2012	60th FAMAS Awards	Best Actress	Kris Aquino	Nominated
2012	60th FAMAS Awards	Best Supporting Actor	Jhong Hilario	Nominated
2012	60th FAMAS Awards	Best Supporting Actress	Angelica Panganiban	Won
2012	60th FAMAS Awards	Best Child Actress	Sofia Millares	Nominated
2012	60th FAMAS Awards	Best Screenplay	Joel Mercado	Nominated
2012	60th FAMAS Awards	Best Story	Joel Mercado	Nominated
2012	60th FAMAS Awards	Best Cinematography	Charlie S. Peralta	Nominated
2012	60th FAMAS Awards	Best Musical Score	Carmina R. Cuya	Nominated
2012	60th FAMAS Awards	Best Editing	Joyce Bernal and Marya Ignacio	Nominated
2012	60th FAMAS Awards	Best Art Direction	Nancy Arcega	Nominated
2012	60th FAMAS Awards	Best Sound	Aurel Claro Bilbao	Nominated
2012	60th FAMAS Awards	Best Special Effects	Erick Torrente	Nominated
2012	60th FAMAS Awards	Best Visual Effects	Earl Bontuyan, Liza Ledesma and Dodge Ledesma	Nominated
2012	30th Luna Awards	Best Picture	Segunda Mano	Nominated
2012	30th Luna Awards	Best Direction	Joyce Bernal	Nominated
2012	30th Luna Awards	Best Actor	Dingdong Dantes	Nominated
2012	30th Luna Awards	Best Sound	Aurel Claro Bilbao	Nominated

== See also ==
- List of ghost films
