= List of Philippine films of 2012 =

This is an incomplete list of Filipino full-length films, both mainstream and independently produced, released in theaters and cinemas in 2012.

== Top ten grossing films ==
Rank	Film	Production outfit	Domestic gross^{1}	Source
1.	Sisterakas	Star Cinema, Viva Films	₱ 393,439,711	
2.	The Mistress	Star Cinema	₱ 262,790,300	
3.	This Guy's in Love with U Mare!	Star Cinema, Viva Films	₱ 249,105,182	
4.	One More Try	Star Cinema	₱ 204,255,920	
5.	ÜnOfficially Yours	Star Cinema	₱ 157,254,200	
6.	Kimmy Dora and the Temple of Kiyeme	Spring Films, Star Cinema	₱ 133,963,009	
7.	Si Agimat, si Enteng Kabisote at si Ako	OctoArts Films, M-Zet Productions, APT Entertainment, Imus Productions, GMA Films	₱ 133,500,000 (est.)	
8.	A Secret Affair	Viva Films	₱ 118,424,018	
9.	The Healing	Star Cinema	₱ 104,602,460	
10.	Tiktik: The Aswang Chronicles	Reality Entertainment, AgostoDos Pictures, PostManila, Mothership, GMA Films	₱ 83,352,091	

Note

1. Box Office Mojo, a reliable third party box office revenue tracker, does not track any revenues earned during any Metro Manila Film Festival editions. So the official figures by film entries during the festival are only estimates taken from any recent updates from credible and reliable sources such as a film's production outfit, or from any news agencies. To verify the figures, see individual sources for the references.

Color key

- – a Metro Manila Film Festival entry film

== Films ==
Opening		Title	Director	Cast and crew	Genre	Ref.
J A N U A R Y	8	A Mother's Story	John D. Lazatin	Pokwang, Rayver Cruz	Drama	
J A N U A R Y	25	My Cactus Heart	Enrico Santos	Maja Salvador, Matteo Guidicelli, Xian Lim	Romance, Drama	
F E B R U A R Y	7	Pintakasi	Lee Meily	Erich Gonzales, JM De Guzman, John Wayne Sace	Drama	
F E B R U A R Y	15	ÜnOfficially Yours	Cathy Garcia-Molina	Angel Locsin, John Lloyd Cruz	Romance, Comedy	
F E B R U A R Y	22	Hitman	Cesar Montano	Cesar Montano, Sam Pinto	Action	
M A R C H	14	Corazon: Ang Unang Aswang	Richard Somes	Erich Gonzales, Derek Ramsay	Horror, Romance	
M A R C H	14	My Kontrabida Girl	Jade Castro	Aljur Abrenica, Rhian Ramos	Romance, Comedy	
M A R C H	21	The Witness	Muhammad Yusuf	Gwen Zamora	Horror, Action	

Opening		Title	Director	Cast and crew	Genre	Ref.
A P R I L	7	Moron 5 and the Crying Lady	Wenn V. Deramas	John Lapus, Luis Manzano, Billy Crawford, Marvin Agustin	Comedy	
A P R I L	18	Busong	Auraeus Solito	Alessandra De Rossi	Drama	
M A Y	9	The Mommy Returns	Joel Lamangan	Ruffa Gutierrez, Gabby Concepcion, Pokwang	Comedy, Fantasy	
M A Y	16	Every Breath U Take	Mae Czarina Cruz	Piolo Pascual, Angelica Panganiban	Romance, Comedy	
M A Y	30	Born To Love You	Jerome Pabocan	Angeline Quinto, Coco Martin	Romance	
J U N E	6	Boy Pick-Up: The Movie	Dominic Zapata	Ogie Alcasid, Dennis Trillo, Solenn Heussaff	Comedy	
J U N E	13	Kimmy Dora and The Temple of Kiyeme	Joyce Bernal	Eugene Domingo	Comedy	

Opening		Title	Director	Cast and crew	Genre	Ref.
J U L Y	25	The Healing	Chito S. Roño	Vilma Santos, Kim Chiu	Thriller, Suspense	
A U G U S T	7	Posas	Lawrence Fajardo	Nico Antonio, Bangs Garcia	Drama	
A U G U S T	15	Just One Summer	Mac Alejandre	Elmo Magalona, Julie Anne San Jose	Romance, Drama	
A U G U S T	15	The Reunion	Frasco Mortiz	Enchong Dee, Xian Lim, Enrique Gil, Kean Cipriano	Comedy, Romance	
A U G U S T	22	Mga Mumunting Lihim	Jose Javier Reyes	Judy Ann Santos, Iza Calzado, Janice de Belen, Agot Isidro	Drama	
A U G U S T	22	Guni-Guni	Tara Illenburger	Lovi Poe, Benjamin Alves	Horror	
A U G U S T	29	Amorosa	Topel Lee	Angel Aquino, Enrique Gil	Horror	
A U G U S T	29	I Do Bidoo Bidoo: Heto nAPO Sila!	Chris Martinez	Ogie Alcasid, Eugene Domingo, Gary Valenciano, Zsa Zsa Padilla, Sam Concepcion	Musical, Comedy, Romance	
S E P T E M B E R	5	Captive	Brillante Mendoza	Isabelle Huppert	Action, Drama, Thriller, War	
S E P T E M B E R	5	Bwakaw	Jun Lana	Eddie Garcia	Comedy	
S E P T E M B E R	12	Ang Nawawala	Marie Jamora	Dominic Roco, Dawn Zulueta	Drama	
S E P T E M B E R	12	The Mistress	Olivia Lamasan	Bea Alonzo, John Lloyd Cruz	Romance, Melodrama	
S E P T E M B E R	12	Graceland	Ron Morales	Arnold Reyes	Drama, Action	
S E P T E M B E R	19	Pridyider	Rico Ilarde	Andi Eigenmann, Janice de Belen, JM De Guzman	Horror	
S E P T E M B E R	19	Biktima	R.D. Alba	Cesar Montano, Angel Aquino, Mercedes Cabral	Drama, Action	
S E P T E M B E R	26	Of All the Things	Joyce Bernal	Aga Muhlach, Regine Velasquez	Romance, Comedy, Drama	
S E P T E M B E R	26	Santa Niña	Emmanuel Palo	Coco Martin, Alessandra de Rossi	Drama	

Opening		Title	Director	Cast and crew	Genre	Ref.
O C T O B E R	3	Give Up Tomorrow	Michael Collins	The story of Paco Larrañaga	Documentary	
O C T O B E R	10	This Guy's in Love with U Mare!	Wenn V. Deramas	Vice Ganda, Toni Gonzaga, Luis Manzano	Comedy	
O C T O B E R	17	Tiktik: The Aswang Chronicles	Erik Matti	Dingdong Dantes, Lovi Poe, Ramon Bautista	Horror, Fantasy, Adventure	
O C T O B E R	24	A Secret Affair	Nuel Naval	Anne Curtis, Derek Ramsay, Andi Eigenmann	Romance, Drama	
O C T O B E R	31	Suddenly It's Magic	Rory Quintos	Mario Maurer, Erich Gonzales	Romance, Comedy	
O C T O B E R	31	Six Degrees of Separation from Lilia Cuntapay	Antoinette Jadaone	Lilia Cuntapay	Comedy, Drama	
N O V E M B E R	7	Madaling Araw, Mahabang Gabi	Dante Nico Garcia	Angelica Panganiban, Kean Cipriano, Glaiza de Castro	Comedy	
N O V E M B E R	21	24/7 in Love	John Lazatin, Mae Cruz, Frasco Mortiz, Dado Lumibao	Piolo Pascual, Bea Alonzo, Zanjoe Marudo, Gerald Anderson, Kim Chiu, John Lloyd Cruz, Angelica Panganiban, Sam Milby, Pokwang, Maja Salvador, Diether Ocampo, Kathryn Bernardo, Daniel Padilla, Zaijian Jaranilla, Xyriel Manabat	Romance, Comedy	
N O V E M B E R	21	Rigodon	Erik Matti	Yam Concepcion, John James Uy	Romance, Thriller	
N O V E M B E R	28	D' Kilabots Pogi Brothers Weh?!	Soxy Topacio	Jose Manalo, Wally Bayola	Comedy	
D E C E M B E R	5	Supremo	Richard Somes	Alfred Vargas	Historical drama, Biopic	
D E C E M B E R	5	Boundary	Benito Bautista	Ronnie Lazaro, Raymond Bagatsing	Drama, Thriller	
D E C E M B E R	12	Flames of Love	Gigi Alfonso	Christopher de Leon, Lani Mercado, Dina Bonnevie, Ricky Davao	Drama	
D E C E M B E R	12	MNL 143	Emerson Reyes	Allan Paule, Joy Viado, Gardo Versoza, Lou Veloso	Dramedy	
D E C E M B E R	25	Si Agimat, Si Enteng, at Si Ako	Tony Reyes	Vic Sotto, Bong Revilla, Jr., Judy Ann Santos	Fantasy, Comedy, Adventure	
D E C E M B E R	25	El Presidente	Mark Meily	E.R. Ejercito, Cristine Reyes, Nora Aunor, Cesar Montano	Historical drama, Action	
D E C E M B E R	25	One More Try	Ruel S. Bayani	Angel Locsin, Dingdong Dantes, Angelica Panganiban, Zanjoe Marudo	Romance	
D E C E M B E R	25	Shake, Rattle & Roll 14	Chito S. Roño	Lovi Poe, Dennis Trillo, Paulo Avelino, Martin Escudero, Vhong Navarro, Janice de Belen, Herbert Bautista	Horror	
D E C E M B E R	25	Sisterakas	Wenn V. Deramas	Kris Aquino, Vice Ganda, Ai-Ai de las Alas, Daniel Padilla, Kathryn Bernardo	Comedy	
D E C E M B E R	25	Sosy Problems	Andoy Ranay	Heart Evangelista, Rhian Ramos, Solenn Heussaff, Bianca King	Comedy, Romance	
D E C E M B E R	25	The Strangers	Lawrence Fajardo	Julia Montes, Enrique Gil, Enchong Dee	Horror, Suspense	
D E C E M B E R	25	Thy Womb	Brillante Mendoza	Nora Aunor, Bembol Roco, Lovi Poe, Mercedes Cabral	Drama	

== Awards ==
=== Local ===
The following first list shows the Best Picture winners at the four major film awards: FAMAS Awards, Gawad Urian Awards, Luna Awards and Star Awards; and at the three major film festivals: Metro Manila Film Festival, Cinemalaya and Cinema One Originals. The second list shows films with the most awards won from the four major film awards and a breakdown of their total number of awards per award ceremony.

Award/Festival	Best Picture		Ref.
61st FAMAS Awards	El Presidente		
36th Gawad Urian Awards	Ang Paglalakbay ng mga Bituin sa Gabing Madilim		
31st Luna Awards	El Presidente		
29th Star Awards for Movies	Alagwa	El Presidente	
23rd Young Critics Circle Citations	Qiyamah		
38th Metro Manila Film Festival	The Grave Bandits	One More Try	
8th Cinemalaya Independent Film Festival	Diablo	Posas	
8th Cinema One Originals Film Festival	Pascalina		

Film	Total	FAMAS	Urian	Luna	Star
El Presidente	27	14	0	5	8
Alagwa	6	0	1	0	5
The Mistress	6	0	0	6	0
One More Try	4	2	0	1	1
Thy Womb	4	0	2	0	2
I Do Bidoo Bidoo: Heto nAPO Sila!	3	0	0	0	3
Mater Dolorosa	3	0	1	0	2

=== International ===
The following list shows Filipino films (released in 2012) which were nominated or won awards at international industry-based awards and FIAPF-accredited competitive film festivals.

Award	Category	Nominee	Result	Source
6th Asia Pacific Screen Awards	Achievement in Directing	Brillante Mendoza, Sinapupunan (Thy Womb)	Won	
6th Asia Pacific Screen Awards	Best Performance by an Actress	Nora Aunor, Sinapupunan (Thy Womb)	Won	
7th Asian Film Awards	Best Actor	Eddie Garcia, Bwakaw	Won	
7th Asian Film Awards	People’s Choice for Favorite Actor	Eddie Garcia, Bwakaw	Won	
7th Asian Film Awards	Best Actress	Nora Aunor, Sinapupunan (Thy Womb)	Won	
7th Asian Film Awards	People’s Choice for Favorite Actor	Nora Aunor, Sinapupunan (Thy Womb)	Nominated	
1st ASEAN International Film Festival and Awards	Best Actor	Jericho Rosales, Alagwa	Nominated	
1st ASEAN International Film Festival and Awards	Best Supporting Actor	Bugoy Cariño, Alagwa	Won	
69th Venice International Film Festival	La Navicella Venezia Cinema Award	Brillante Mendoza, Sinapupunan (Thy Womb)	Won	
69th Venice International Film Festival	Nazareno Taddei Award - Special Mention	Brillante Mendoza, Sinapupunan (Thy Womb)	Won	
69th Venice International Film Festival	Bisato d'Oro - Best Actress	Nora Aunor, Sinapupunan (Thy Womb)	Won	
28th Warsaw International Film Festival	NETPAC Award	Adolfo Alix, Jr., Kalayaan (Wildlife)	Won	
25th Tokyo International Film Festival	Winds of Asia-Middle East - Special Mention	Jun Lana, Bwakaw	Won	

== See also ==
- 2012 in the Philippines
- List of 2012 box office number-one films in the Philippines
