= The Strangers (2012 film) =

2012 Filipino horror adventure film

- Theatrical movie poster
- Directed by: Lawrence Fajardo
- Screenplay by: John Bedia; JP Abellera; Enrico Santos
- Story by: John Bedia; Henry Burgos; John Roque; Armando Lao
- Produced by: Joji Alonso
- Starring: Enchong Dee; Julia Montes; Janice de Belen; JM De Guzman; Enrique Gil; Cherry Pie Picache
- Cinematography: Louie Quirino
- Edited by: Lawrence Fajardo
- Music by: Joseph Lansang
- Production companies: Quantum Films; MJM Productions
- Distributed by: Star Cinema
- Release date: December 25, 2012
- Country: Philippines
- Language: Filipino
- Budget: ₱31 million
- Box office: ₱7.3 million (first two days)

The Strangers is a 2012 Philippine horror adventure film edited and directed by Lawrence Fajardo and one of the official entries of the 38th Metro Manila Film Festival. The film stars an ensemble cast including Enchong Dee, Julia Montes, Enrique Gil and JM De Guzman with Janice de Belen. The film is produced by Quantum Films and MJM Productions and distributed by Star Cinema on December 25, 2012.

== Plot ==
In the serene oasis of Murcia, a dysfunctional family embarks on their annual out-of-town trip to celebrate the twins, Pat (Julia Montes) and Max's (Enrique Gil) 18th birthday. Pat and Max are joined by their parents, Roy (Johnny Revilla) and Evelyn (Cherry Pie Picache), their grandfather Pete (Jaime Fabregas), his caregiver Paloma (Janice de Belen), and their newly hired family driver, Toning (Nico Antonio). Despite simmering tensions within the family, they agree to set aside their differences and enjoy the provincial excursion.

As they traverse the countryside's winding backroads, their joy is abruptly shattered when their van collides with an elderly woman on the road. Panic consumes them as they search for the woman's body, only to find it had mysteriously vanished.

Roy, fearing the worst, urges the family to flee the scene. But their escape is short-lived as their van breaks down deep within the ominous Cabitongan forest. Night descends upon them, and misfortune follows suit.

Toning loses Roy and then falls victim to an unknown creature. Roy disappears into the shadows, and Lolo Pete meets a gruesome end as he prepares to battle a monstrous entity.

With their van immobilized, the remaining family members unite to face their dire predicament. However, their ordeal takes a chilling turn when they discover they are trapped in a remote village led by the enigmatic Kapitan Tasyo and his family. Among the eerie villagers, Evelyn encounters a woman who warns of demons in their midst, but her claims are dismissed as the ramblings of a madwoman.

Amidst the turmoil, Pat is plagued by an unsettling feeling, urging her to escape. She forms an alliance with Dolfo, a mysterious young man whom the villagers suspect of malevolence. Pat's journey leads her to Dolfo's cave, where she tends to his wounds and learns of his tragic past, marred by the murderous Aswang that had annihilated his family. He survived the attack and remains in the forest, stalking the Aswangs, determined to wipe them out. The superstitious villagers hunt him. Pat is empathetic towards his story and urges him to run away. She appears to want to join him.

Meanwhile, Max and the search party, including Tasyo, venture into the forest, where they encounter a terrorized mad man who warns them of an Aswang killing his companions.

Within the village where Tasio’s wife and other women remain, strange occurrences intensify, driving Pat's unease to new heights. She finds solace in her connection with Dolfo, even as the villagers ostracize him. As Pat delves deeper into Dolfo's past, she discoverers the gruesome truth about the aswang that has plagued the area every year at this time.

In a shocking revelation, Tasio and his hunting party come upon the cadaver remains of Lolo Pepe and realize the family they gave safe refuge to, are Aswangs. They rush back to save their women and children. At this point, Max and Roy transforms into their true nature and kill those who might harm their mother and sister. Roy is overpowered and killed by Tasio. Max avenges his father’s demise, slaughters and eats Tasio.

Pat, Max, and their parents are part of a secret clan of aswangs. Lolo Pete's demise was the result of a power struggle with Roy.

Dolfo also realizes Pat’s true nature and attempts to kill her but Max kills him. In the aftermath, the twins mourn their father.

At the village, Evelyn has sated herself, killing everyone, although Paloma is able to escape, though her whereabouts remain unknown.

A year later, the twins prepare for another annual trip to the province, this time accompanied by Roy's brother, as they continue to navigate their eerie and enigmatic legacy.

== Cast ==
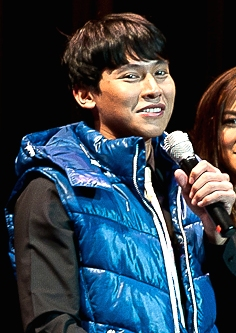
Enchong Dee portrays Dolfo.

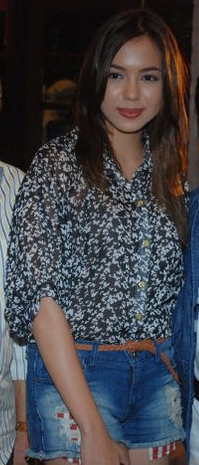
Julia Montes portrays Pat.

- Enchong Dee as Dolfo
- Enrique Gil as Max
- Julia Montes as Pat
- Cherry Pie Picache as Evelyn
- Art Acuña as Kapitan Tasyo
- Nico Antonio as Toning
- Janice de Belen as Paloma
- Jaime Fabregas as Lolo Pete
- Mark Gil (uncredited)
- Tanya Gomez as Corazon
- JM De Guzman as Crispin
- Rita De Guzman as Celia
- Spanky Manikan as the albularyo
- Johnny Revilla as Roy

== Casting ==
After the film was submitted as an official entry to the 38th Metro Manila Film Festival, it was announced that Quantum Films cast Star Magic contract artists including Enchong Dee, Julia Montes and Enrique Gil for the lead roles. Other cast members announced includes Janice De Belen, Cherry Pie Picache and Jaime Fabregas.

In October 2012, after the official teaser were released, JM de Guzman and Johnny Revilla were added to the cast.

== Release ==
In mid-December 2012, creative producer Josabeth Alonso described the process of promoting The Strangers and convincing theater managers to exhibit the film in more screens as "toxic", writing that "as early as [N]ovember, theaters have predictions as to which films will make it to the TOP 4. [S]ince many provincial malls have only 4 theaters, they give it to the TOP 4 as they predicted.... The Strangers has been predicted by the theatre managers and bookers at number 5. [S]o where does that leave us? [R]oughly 60 theaters to date."

=== Critical reception ===
Mark Angelo Ching of PEP.ph noted that the film's plot twist is clever but otherwise limits how the film tells its story. Phillip Cu Unjieng of ABS-CBN News noted that the film is director Lawrence Fajardo's first attempt in working on a mainstream movie. As such, the film show's some "indie sense of gallows humor".

The film was graded "B" by the Cinema Evaluation Board.

=== Box office ===
The film opened at fifth spot out of the eight entries in the 2012 Metro Manila Film Festival, grossing with over ₱4.9 million and is behind Sisterakas (₱39.2 million), Si Agimat, si Enteng Kabisote at si Ako (₱29.4 million), One More Try (₱13.2 million) and Shake, Rattle & Roll 14: The Invasion (₱10.6 million), which opened first until fourth places.
