= Metro Manila Film Festival New Wave Awards =

Annual Philippine film award

- Country: Philippines
- Presented by: MMDA
- Website: www.mmda.gov.ph/mmff/

The following are the New Wave Awards given by the Metro Manila Film Festival.

== History ==
In 2010, the film festival had undergone some changes. One change is that the festival format will give a tribute to independent "indie" films. For the first time in the 36 editions of the Metro Manila Film Festival, it paid tribute to the independent filmmakers in the country by featuring five indie films in addition to the eight mainstream movie entries in the 36th Metro Manila Film Festival.

In September 2011, Atty. Francis Tolentino, chairman of the Metropolitan Manila Development Authority (MMDA) changed the category name of "Indie" films to "New Wave" films to make it sound better and more attractive to hear, as well as including "Student Short Film Category" for the first time. The New Wave category starts during the 37th Metro Manila Film Festival in 2011.

In 2016, they announced that there would no longer be a distinction made between "mainstream" and "indie" films in the MMFF and the New Wave Category was dissolved.

== Indie Films awards ==
=== 36th Metro Manila Film Festival ===
- Best Indie Film: Presa - Adolf Alix, Jr.

== New Wave awards ==
=== 37th Metro Manila Film Festival ===
Winners:

- Best Full-Length Film: Pintakasi - Imee Marcos and Nelson Caguila
- Best Student Film: Payaso - De La Salle Lipa

Mate - Colegio de San Juan de Letran

- Best Actress: Iza Calzado - HIV
- Best Actor :JM De Guzman - Pintakasi
- Gender Sensitivity Award: HIV - Neil Tan (Full-Length Category)

Speechless - Miriam College (Student Category)

- Special Jury Prize: Biyahe ni Barbie - Kookai Labayen of De La Salle-College of Saint Benilde

=== 38th Metro Manila Film Festival ===
Winners:

- Best New Wave Full-Length Film: The Grave Bandits - Tyrone Acierto
- Special Jury Prize: Ad Ignorantiam
- Best New Wave Actor: Allan Paule - Gayak
- Best New Wave Actress: Liza Dino - In Nomine Matris
- Gender Sensitivity Award: In Nomine Matris - Mr. Will Fredo
- Best New Wave Director Award: Tyrone Ancierto - The Grave Bandits

Short Film Category

- Best Student's Short Film Award: Pukpok - De La Salle University
- Most Gender Sensitive Award: Manibela - Far Eastern University
- Special Jury Prize: Tagad - University of San Carlos

1st CinePhone Film Festival

- Luzon: Monthsary - Polytechnic University of the Philippines

Promdi - Don Bosco Youth Center

- Visayas: Two Minutes - University of San Carlos

License to Drive - Christian Academy of Bacolod

- Mindanao: The Boy, the Girl and the Traffic Man - Ateneo de Davao University

Bulgaran sa Daan - Philippine Nikkei Jin Kai International High School

=== 39th Metro Manila Film Festival ===
Winners:

- Best Picture: Dukit
- Best Director: Armando Lao - Dukit
- Best Actor: Wilfredo Layug, Bor Ocampo, Bambalito Lacap - Dukit
- Best Actress: Agot Isidro - Mga Anino ng Kahapon
- Most Gender Sensitivity Award: Island Dreams
- Special Jury Prize: Mga Anino ng Kahapon
- Student Short Film Special Jury Prize: #NoFilter
- Student Short Film Most Gender-Sensitive Film: Hintayin Mo sa Seq. 24
- Animation Best Picture: Kaleh and Mbaki
- Animation Special Jury Prize: Ang Lalong ni Kulakog

=== 40th Metro Manila Film Festival ===
Winners:

- Best Picture: Magkakabaung
- Best Director: Jason Paul Laxamana, Magkakabaung
- Best Actor: Allen Dizon, Magkakabaung
- Best Actress: Zsa Zsa Padilla, M (Mother's Maiden Name)
- Best Supporting Actor: Kristoffer King, Maratabat (Pride and Honor)
- Best Supporting Actress: Gloria Sevilla, M (Mother's Maiden Name)
- Special Jury Prize: M (Mother's Maiden Name)
- Best Student Film: Bundok Chubibo by Glenn Barit
- Student Film Special Jury Prize: Kalaw by Immy Rempis
- Best Animation Film: An Maogmang Lugar by Mary Espedido
- Animation Film Special Jury Prize: Cherry by Dustin Uy

3rd CinePhone Film Festival Winner

- Luzon: MAYA by Arenz Dionela - De La Salle - College of Saint Benilde

=== 41st Metro Manila Film Festival ===
- Best Picture – ARI: My Life with a King
- Best Director – John Paul Su, Toto
- Best Actor – JM de Guzman, Tandem & Francisco Guinto, ARI: My Life with a King
- Best Supporting Actor – Thou Reyes, Toto
- Best Supporting Actress – Bibeth Orteza, Toto
- Best Screenplay – Robert Tantingco, ARI: My Life with a King
- Special Jury Prize – Toto
- Manila Bulletin Entertainment Best Picture – ARI: My Life with a King
- Best Short Film – Mumu by Jean Cheryl Tagyamon
- Short Film Special Jury Prize – Daisy by Brian Reyes
- Manila Bulletin Entertainment Best Short Film – Momento by Jan-Kyle Nieva
- Best Animation Film – Buttons by Marvel Obemio, Francis Ramirez & Jared Garcia
- Animation Film Special Jury Prize – Lights Lights by Rivelle Mallari
- Manila Bulletin Entertainment Best Animation Film – Geo by John Aurthur Mercader
