= Metro Manila Film Festival =

Philippine film festival

- Location: Metro Manila (Official); Philippines-wide (Informally)
- Predecessor: Manila Film Festival (1966−1975)
- Founded: 1975; 51 years ago
- Awards: Gabi ng Parangal (lit. 'Awards Night')
- No. of films: 6 (1987-1990, 1992-2000); 7 (1986, 1991, 2001, 2009, 2011); 8 (1975, 1983, 2004, 2008-2019, 2021-2022, 2025); 9 (1977, 1978, 1984, 2002, 2003, 2006-2007); 10 (1976, 1979-1982, 1985, 2005, 2020, 2023-2024)
- Language: Primarily Filipino

Recent: 2025 Metro Manila Film Festival
- 2026 (52nd ed.) 2024 (50th ed.)

The Metro Manila Film Festival (MMFF) is an annual film festival organized by the Metro Manila Development Authority and held nationwide in the Philippines. The festival, which runs from Christmas Day through New Year's Day and into the first weekend of January in the following year, focuses on Filipino produced films. During the course of the festival, movie theaters show only films that are approved by its jurors and exclude foreign films except in 3D theaters and IMAX theaters. It is one of the two major Filipino film festivals that exclude foreign films in a week-long period, the other being the Pista ng Pelikulang Pilipino happening during August.

The annual event began with the 1975 Metro Manila Film Festival, during which Diligin Mo ng Hamog ang Uhaw na Lupa ("Water the Thirsty Earth with Dew") directed by Augusto Buenaventura won the best film award. For the 28th edition in 2002, the festival was expanded to be nationwide in scope instead of simply being held in Metro Manila.

One of the festival highlights is the parade of floats at the opening of the festival. The floats, each one representing a movie entry with their respective stars, parade down usually Roxas Boulevard, as was the case in many of the previous awards. Initially the float parade was held on December 24 until 2011. But Starting in 2012, it is now held earlier before usual Christmas Eve. Beginning in 2017, however, the float parade is now usually hosted by each of the 17 local governments of the capital region. On the awards night, a Best Float award is also announced along with the major acting awards.

A sister festival which is a spin-off of the MMFF, the Summer Metro Manila Film Festival, was supposed to have its first edition in April 2020. but was canceled due to the COVID-19 pandemic; its inaugural edition was instead launched in April 2023. A second spin-off festival, the Manila International Film Festival, was launched in 2024 as an extension of the MMFF, taking place in Los Angeles, California.

== History ==
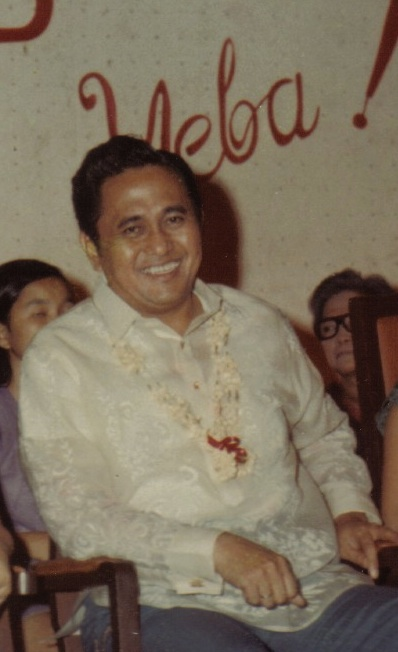
Mayor of Manila Antonio Villegas in 1970, founder of the "Manila Film Festival".

The logo of Metro Manila Film Festival from 2010 to 2016

A precursor of the current festival began in 1966. Then-mayor of Manila Antonio Villegas inaugurated the "Manila Film Festival" ("Manila Tagalog Film Festival"). It was set up in order to get Philippine films screened in "first-run" theaters which at that time only screened American films. It was a 12-day event from June 14 through June 24, Manila's birthday, during which only locally produced films could be shown in theaters. The festival featured a parade in downtown Manila of actors and the featured films. Most of the first batch of the festival films came up with English titles. Despite the lack of support, there were different changes in making the festival flourish.

The best films of Manila Film Festival included Daigdig ng mga Api (1966), Dahil sa Isang Bulaklak (1967), Manila, Open City (1968), Patria Adorada (1969), Dimasalang (1970), Cadena de Amor (1971), Elias, Basilio at Sisa (1972), Nueva Vizcaya (1973) and Alaala mo Daigdig Ko (1974).

In 1973, the Manila Film Festival was discontinued as Martial Law was imposed in September the year before. On September 21, 1975, during the Marcos Presidency, the filmfest was expanded to include all the other cities and towns in the newly formed Metro Manila and began under the name "1975 Metropolitan Film Festival" (MFF). In 1977, name was changed to "Metro Manila Film Festival".

After Villegas' death in 1984, a special award in the Metro Manila Film Festival, the Gatpuno Antonio J. Villegas Cultural Award, was created in his honor and is given to the best film that best portrays Philippine culture and Filipino people to the world. MRN Film International's Andrea, Paano Ba ang Maging Isang Ina? was the first one to receive the lifetime achievement award in 1990. Since then, it has been awarding prestigious films that deserves the honors.

In 2010, the film festival underwent some changes. First, the commercial viability criterion (box-office performance of the entries) was removed. As of 2010, the criteria for the selection of Best Picture(s) are: artistry; creativity and technical excellence; innovation; and thematic value. Entries are also judged for global appeal (70 percent) and Filipino cultural and/or historical value (30 percent). In addition, the festival format gave a tribute to independent "indie" films. Lastly, the established board of jurors was expanded to include housewives, drivers, students, teachers, etc. The festival logo was changed to feature a map of the Metropolis of Manila, based on the old seal of the Metropolitan Manila Development Authority with seventeen stars on it symbolizing the 17 cities and municipality of Metro Manila. The logo for the first 35 festivals featured a torch.

In September 2011, Atty. Francis Tolentino, then-chairman of the Metropolitan Manila Development Authority (MMDA) changed the category name of "indie" films to "New Wave" films to make it sound better and more attractive to hear, as well as including "Student Short Film Category" for the first time. Consequently, the next year, the 38th Metro Manila Film Festival held in 2012 became the highest earning MMFF to date with 767 million pesos, 21% higher than that of 2011.

In January 2013 Interaksyon.com review, writer Jessica Zafra complained, "Speaking of standards, why do we bother to review the festival entries when most of them are rubbish? Because they're not supposed to be rubbish! Contrary to what you've been led to believe, 'entertainment' and 'commercial appeal' are not synonyms for 'garbage'. There are good commercial movies, and there are bad commercial movies. The bad outnumber the good because the studios think the viewers are idiots."

== Notable incidents ==
There have been numerous notable incidents during the various festivals.

In 1977, director Lino Brocka walked out of the awarding ceremonies at the Metropolitan Theater when Celso Ad. Castillo's Burlesk Queen starring Vilma Santos won eight of the ten awards including the Best Picture award during the 3rd Metro Manila Film Festival. Brocka reportedly threw invectives at Rolando Tinio, who was the chairman of the panel of judges of the festival.

In 1978, the board of jurors decided to not award honors for Best Actor, Best Actress, Best Supporting Actor and Best Supporting Actress on the 4th Metro Manila Film Festival. Instead, the jurors gave Nora Aunor a "Best Performer" award for her role in the movie Atsay. Aunor beat Vilma Santos, whom fortune-tellers on the then-popular talk show of Inday Badiday and many moviegoers predicted would win the award for her role in the movie Rubia Servios. When Nora accepted her award, she cried "Mama, mali ang hula nila" ("Mama, their prediction is wrong") in an apparent reference to the fortune-tellers.

In 1983, during the awards night of the 9th Metro Manila Film Festival, many were surprised after Coney Reyes won the Best Actress award for the movie Bago Kumalat ang Dugo and Anthony Alonzo won the Best Actor award for the same movie, besting acting greats Charito Solis, Phillip Salvador, and Vic Silayan, who were all in the movie Karnal. In addition, the jury's standards of giving Willie Milan the Best Director award against Lino Brocka was questioned.

In 1986, for the first time, the 12th Metro Manila Film Festival did not give out the traditional first and second Best Picture awards as well as the other two categories: Best Story and Best Screenplay. One of the jurors, Tingting Cojuangco stated: "No one of the seven entries deserved these awards..." She added that they: "...would like to express [their] concern over the current state of the Philippine movie industry as reflected in the entries to the year's MMFF...[The entries] failed to reinforce and inculcate positive Filipino values by portraying negative stereotypes, imitating foreign films and perpetuating commercially-oriented movies...".

In 1988 during the award-giving ceremony of the 14th Metro Manila Film Festival, stuntman and character actor-turned-filmmaker Baldo Marro won the Best Actor for the film Patrolman, which also won him the Best Director award. In fact, he was not known before this. He bested prizewinning director Chito Roño of Itanong Mo Sa Buwan in the division, sending uproar from well-meaning critics and regular local film observers. Nevertheless, the announced Best Director award went to Laurice Guillen.

In 1993, during the "Gabi ng Parangal" of the 1993 Metro Manila Film Festival, the list of winners was supposedly leaked.

In 1994, during the "Gabi ng Parangal" of 20th Metro Manila Film Festival held in PICC, the six major awards (Three Best Pictures, Gatpuno Antonio J. Villegas Cultural Awards, Best Director, and Best Screenplay) were not given as Alejandro Roces, chairman of the Board of Jurors announced that "none of the entries was deserving".

On December 27, 2001, during the 27th Metro Manila Film Festival, Cesar Montano, despite receiving the Best Actor award, expressed his disappointment that his film, Bagong Buwan did not receive the Best Picture award, saying that they will just buy one at Recto, a district in Manila infamously known for manufacturing forgeries.

In 2002, the cast of the film Dekada '70 walked out of the award ceremonies after Lualhati Bautista failed to win the Best Story and Best Screenplay awards. Even more controversial was the decision of the judges to name first-timer Ara Mina the Best Actress for her role in Mano Po, beating multi-awarded Vilma Santos, who was in Dekada '70. In addition, the producers of the films Spirit Warriors: The Shortcut and Lastikman protested the non-inclusion of the two films as official entries, prompting the Festival committee to extend the annual event. Consequently, the committee extended the film screenings to seven days to accommodate two more films which did not make it to the entries. Chito Roño, director of Second Best Picture Dekada '70, expressed wonder as to why Spirit Warriors was named the Third Best Picture award if the officials disqualified it as an official entry. The production team of Ang Agimat: Antin-Anting ni Lolo was also appalled at the decision of the jurors to give the Best Visual Effects award to Spirit Warriors if they only use "mono", beating their use of the more advanced "Dolby Digital system".

In 2005, director Joel Lamangan walked out after he lost to Jose Javier Reyes. Lamangan failed to win the Best Director for Blue Moon against Reyes' Kutob. In the same year, Regal Films's matriarch Lily Monteverde voiced out her disappointment as she lamented that some winners in the festival were "undeserving".

In 2006, Octoarts Films and M-Zet Production's Enteng Kabisote 3: Okay Ka, Fairy Ko: The Legend Goes On and On and On was declared the Best Picture after festival organizers changed the criteria for the award by giving more weight to "commercial appeal". As it was the only prize that the film won, the decision to let the film receive it became the subject of yet another controversy at the festival. Movie producer Star Cinema made a protest to the MMDA and wrote to then MMFF chairman Bayani Fernando, claiming that the movie Kasal, Kasali, Kasalo should have won Best Picture because it topped the box office for the first few days.

In 2007, the awards night ended in less than an hour after festival organizers decided to just announce the winners without even mentioning the nominees for each category. The organizers explained that it had to be rushed and had to end at exactly 9pm because a concert, featuring singer Lani Misalucha, was scheduled right after the awards ceremonies.

In 2011, Amable "Tikoy" Aguiluz declined to accept the award for Best Director for the movie Manila Kingpin: The Asyong Salonga Story after he claimed that the movie "was edited without his consent beyond his recognition."

In 2014, Rina Navarro, one of the producers of Bonifacio: Ang Unang Pangulo questioned the result of the panel's judgement in the awards night. The movie won the Best Picture award but failed to win other major categories such as the Best Director award, the Best Actor and Best Actress awards, the Best Screenplay award, and the Best Original Story award all of which went to Dan Villegas' English Only, Please.

In 2015, a day before the awards night, Erik Matti's Honor Thy Father was disqualified for the Best Picture award after being screened at the Cinema One Originals. Dondon Monteverde, the film's producer, revealed that they did disclose this information beforehand. He attested that its premiere at the Cinema One festival did not generate revenue which complies by the rules. He also questioned the timing of this decision and demanded an investigation.

In 2016, the festival gained attention after its executive committee announced the top 8 entries for the 2016 edition. Different from past years, the movies of certified box-office drawers Vice Ganda & Coco Martin's The Super Parental Guardians, Vic Sotto's Enteng Kabisote 10 and the Abangers, Regal Entertainment's Mano Po 7: Tsinoy and Vhong Navarro's Mang Kepweng Returns were rejected in that edition. This was the first edition of the festival that showed only independent films. But despite good reviews about the 8 entries, the film festival only grossed ₱373 million, or a ₱667 million drop from 2015 Metro Manila Film Festival's ₱1.040 billion. This led to commercial films returning to the festival the following year.

== Scope ==
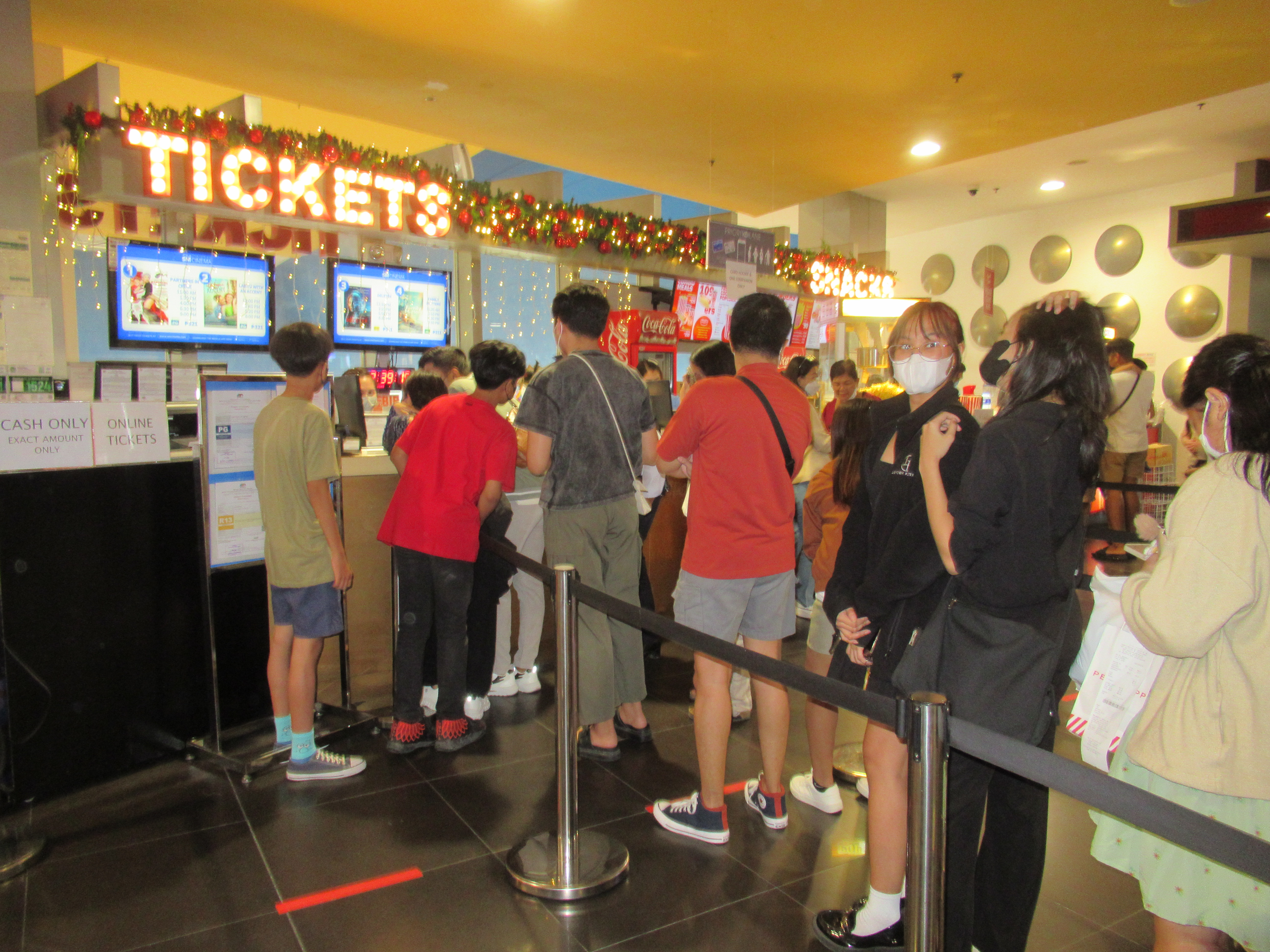
Patrons lining up for tickets for the 2022 Metro Manila Film Festival.

As the name suggests, the Metro Manila Film Festival ran by the Metropolitan Manila Development Authority covers cinemas within Metro Manila. The initial allocation of cinema slots for the film festival's entry films are determined through lottery. This allocation system had only been applied for cinemas in Metro Manila in the past, but this now utilized for cinemas outside the metropolis as well. However cinemas are free to drop or continue to screen certain entry films after the first day. Cinemas outside Metro Manila are also free to screen non-entries, as was the case during the run of the 2016 edition, where non-entry mainstream films The Super Parental Guardians and Enteng Kabisote 10 and the Abangers were screened by select provincial theaters during the festival's run.

== Festivals ==
Festival	Year	Awards Night	
Festival	Year	Venue	City
1st	1975	Metropolitan Theater	Manila
2nd	1976	Metropolitan Theater	Manila
3rd	1977	Metropolitan Theater	Manila
4th	1978	Cultural Center of the Philippines	Manila
5th	1979	Metropolitan Theater	Manila
6th	1980	Metropolitan Theater	Manila
7th	1981	Cultural Center of the Philippines	Manila
8th	1982	Cultural Center of the Philippines	Manila
9th	1983	Cultural Center of the Philippines	Manila
10th	1984	Metropolitan Theater	Manila
11th	1985	Rizal Theater	Makati
12th	1986	University of Life Theater and Recreational Arena	Pasig
13th	1987	University of Life Theater and Recreational Arena	Pasig
14th	1988	Philippine International Convention Center	Pasay
15th	1989	University of Life Theater and Recreational Arena	Pasig
16th	1990	University of Life Theater and Recreational Arena	Pasig
17th	1991	University of Life Theater and Recreational Arena	Pasig
18th	1992	Philippine International Convention Center	Pasay
19th	1993	Philippine International Convention Center	Pasay
20th	1994	Philippine International Convention Center	Pasay
21st	1995	Metropolitan Theater	Manila
22nd	1996	Metropolitan Theater	Manila
23rd	1997	Metropolitan Theater	Manila
24th	1998	Metropolitan Theater	Manila
25th	1999	Metropolitan Theater	Manila
26th	2000	Philippine International Convention Center	Pasay
27th	2001	Philippine International Convention Center	Pasay
28th	2002	Philippine International Convention Center	Pasay
29th	2003	Philippine International Convention Center	Pasay
30th	2004	Aliw Theater	Pasay
31st	2005	Aliw Theater	Pasay
32nd	2006	Aliw Theater	Pasay
33rd	2007	SMX Convention Center	Pasay
34th	2008	Sofitel Philippine Plaza	Pasay
35th	2009	SMX Convention Center	Pasay
36th	2010	Meralco Theater	Pasig
37th	2011	Newport Performing Arts Theater	Pasay
38th	2012	Meralco Theater	Pasig
39th	2013	Meralco Theater	Pasig
40th	2014	Philippine International Convention Center	Pasay
41st	2015	Kia Theatre	Quezon City
42nd	2016	Kia Theatre	Quezon City
43rd	2017	Kia Theatre	Quezon City
44th	2018	The Theater at Solaire	Parañaque
45th	2019	New Frontier Theater	Quezon City
46th	2020	Project Space (Note: The 2020 Metro Manila Film Festival awards night was held virtually due to the COVID-19 pandemic. The event was largely recorded in the Project Space studio in Makati.)	Makati
47th	2021	SM Aura Premier	Taguig
48th	2022	New Frontier Theater	Quezon City
49th	2023	New Frontier Theater	Quezon City
50th	2024	The Theater at Solaire	Parañaque
51st	2025	Dusit Thani Manila	Makati
52nd	2026	TBA	

== Awards ==
The Gabi ng Parangal (lit. 'Awards Night') serves as the awarding ceremony for participating films in the Metro Manila Film Festival.

=== Merit categories ===
==== Festival awards ====
- Best Picture: since 1975
- Best Director: since 1975
- Best Actor: since 1975
- Best Actress: since 1975
- Best Supporting Actor: since 1975
- Best Supporting Actress: since 1975
- Best Child Performer: since 1980 (except 2016 and 2021)
- Best Screenplay: since 1975
- Best Original Story: 1975–2016
- Best Cinematography: since 1975
- Best Production Design: since 1986 (former named as "Best Art Direction" from 1976–1986)
- Best Editing: since 1975
- Best Visual Effects: since 1990
- Best Make-up Artist: 1990–2015
- Best Original Theme Song : since 1989
- Best Musical Score: since 1975
- Best Sound Engineering: since 1975 (also known as "Best Sound Recording")
- Best Float: since 1992
- Most Gender-Sensitive Film: 2003–2013; 2019 onwards

==== Special awards ====
annually awarded

- Special Jury Citation: since 2024
- Gatpuno Antonio J. Villegas Cultural Awards: since 1990
- Fernando Poe Jr. Memorial Award for Excellence: since 2012
- Special Jury Prize: since 2016
- Manay Ichu Vera-Perez Maceda Memorial Award: (2022–2023)
- Breakthrough Performance Award: since 2024

not annually awarded

- Lifetime Achievement Award: since 2009
- Posthumous Award for Film Service and Excellence: since 2009

==== Other awards ====
- People's Choice Awards
- Children's Choice Awards
- Star of the Night Awards

==== Short film categories ====
- Best Short Film: since 2016
- Special Jury Prize: since 2016
- Best Director: since 2016
- Best Screenplay: since 2016

==== Defunct New Wave categories ====
- Best Full-Length Film: 2010–2015
- Best Actress: 2011–2015
- Best Actor: 2011–2015
- Best Director: 2012–2015
- Gender Sensitivity Award: 2011–2015
- Special Jury Prize: 2011–2015
- Best Student Film: 2011–2015
- New Wave Animation Best Picture: 2011–2015

== Most received wins ==
This is a list of superlative Metro Manila Film Festival winners. This list is current as of the 2021 Metro Manila Film Festival "Gabi ng Parangal" (awards ceremony) held on December 27, 2021.

The following are fifteen films which have received ten or more awards in different categories.

Film	Record Set	Year	Production company(s)	Notes
José Rizal	17	1998	GMA Films	*won all awards except Best Actress
10,000 Hours	14	2013	Philippine Film Studios, N2 Productions and Viva Films	
Magic Temple	14	1996	Star Cinema	
Muro-Ami	13	1999	GMA Films	
Manila Kingpin: The Asiong Salonga Story	12	2011	Viva Films and Scenema Concept International	
Mano Po	12	2002	Regal Films	
Mindanao	11	2019	Center Stage Productions	
Rainbow's Sunset	11	2018	Heaven's Best Entertainment	
Yamashita: The Tiger's Treasure	11	2001	MAQ Productions	
Muling Umawit ang Puso	11	1995	Viva Films	
Andrea, Paano Ba ang Maging Isang Ina?	11	1990	MRN Film International	
Imortal	11	1989	Viva Films	
Baler	10	2008	Viva Films	
Kasal, Kasali, Kasalo	10	2006	Star Cinema	
Nasaan ang Puso	10	1997	MAQ Productions	
Halimaw sa Banga	10	1986	NCV Productions	*only the third Best Picture is given.
Kisapmata	10	1981	Bancom Audiovision	

=== Best Director ===
Director	Record Set	First year awarded	Recent year awarded
Joel Lamangan	4	1995	2018
Jose Javier Reyes	3	1993	2006
Marilou Diaz-Abaya	3	1980	1999
Brillante Mendoza	2	2012	2019
Erik Matti	2	2015	2016
Mark Meily	2	2003	2008
Chito Roño	2	1997	2001
Laurice Guillen	2	1988	2000
Eddie Garcia	2	1987	1989
Mario O'Hara	2	1984	1986
Lino Brocka	2	1979	1985

=== Best Actor ===
Actor	Record Set	First year awarded	Recent year awarded
Christopher de Leon	7	1976	2008
Cesar Montano	3	1998	2006
Anthony Alonzo	3	1983	1987
Derek Ramsay	2	2014	2017
Dingdong Dantes	2	2011	2012
Dolphy	2	1990	2010
Eric Quizon	2	1991	2003
Aga Muhlach	2	1992	1993
Dennis Trillo	2	2018	2024

=== Best Actress ===
Actress	Record Set	First year awarded	Recent year awarded
Nora Aunor	8	1978	2012
Maricel Soriano	5	1997	2013
Vilma Santos	5	1977	2023
Amy Austria	3	1980	1996
Judy Ann Santos	3	2006	2024
Gloria Romero	2	2000	2018
Jennylyn Mercado	2	2014	2015

=== Best Supporting Actor ===
Supporting Actor	Record Set	First year awarded	Recent year awarded
Pen Medina	2	1999	2013
Cesar Montano	2	1989	2012
Phillip Salvador	2	2008	2009
Johnny Delgado	2	1979	2006
Ronaldo Valdez	2	1993	1997
Dick Israel	2	1988	1994
John Arcilla	2	1996	2021

=== Best Supporting Actress ===
Supporting Actress	Record Set	First year awarded	Recent year awarded
Eugene Domingo	3	2007	2011
Cherie Gil	3	1985	2000
Nida Blanca	2	1975	1997

== Most combined wins ==
Most combined awards for Best Actor, Best Supporting Actor, and Best Director.

Name	Record Set	Categories won
Cesar Montano	6	3 Best Actor, 2 Best Supporting Actor, 1 Best Director
Eddie Garcia	3	2 Best Director, 1 Best Actor
Mario O'Hara	3	2 Best Director, 1 Best Actor
Johnny Delgado	3	2 Best Supporting Actor, 1 Best Actor
Dolphy	3	2 Best Actor, 1 Best Supporting Actor
Dennis Trillo	3	2 Best Actor, 1 Best Supporting Actor
Vic Silayan	2	1 Best Actor, 1 Best Supporting Actor
Christian Bables	2	1 Best Actor, 1 Best Supporting Actor

Most combined awards for Best Actress and Best Supporting Actress.

Name	Record Set	Categories won
Amy Austria	4	3 Best Actress, 1 Best Supporting Actress
Charito Solis	2	1 Best Actress, 1 Best Supporting Actress
Gina Alajar	2	1 Best Actress, 1 Best Supporting Actress
Hilda Koronel	2	1 Best Actress, 1 Best Supporting Actress

== Highest-grossing entries ==
The table shows the highest-grossing Filipino film entries in the Metro Manila Film Festival that hits the hundred million mark.

Rank	Year	Title	Production company	Box office
1	2023	Rewind	Star Cinema, APT Entertainment, AgostoDos Pictures	₱924 million
2	2018	Fantastica	Star Cinema, Viva Films	₱596 million
3	2017	Gandarrapiddo: The Revenger Squad	Star Cinema, Viva Films	₱571 million
4	2019	Miracle in Cell No. 7	Viva Films	₱543 million
5	2015	Beauty and the Bestie	Star Cinema, Viva Films	₱529 million
6	2024	And the Breadwinner Is...	Star Cinema, The IdeaFirst Company	₱460 million
7	2014	The Amazing Praybeyt Benjamin	Star Cinema, Viva Films	₱455 million
8	2013	Girl, Boy, Bakla, Tomboy	Star Cinema, Viva Films	₱421 million
9	2012	Sisterakas	Star Cinema, Viva Films	₱393.4 million
10	2015	My Bebe Love: KiligPaMore	GMA Pictures, OctoArts Films, M-Zet Productions, APT Entertainment, MEDA Productions	₱385 million
11	2018	Jack Em Popoy: The Puliscredibles	M-Zet Productions, APT Entertainment, CCM Film Productions	₱383 million
12	2017	Ang Panday (2017)	Star Cinema, Viva Films, CCM Film Productions	₱379 million
13	2013	My Little Bossings	OctoArts Films, M-Zet Productions, APT Entertainment, K Productions	₱375.9 million
14	2019	The Mall, The Merrier	Star Cinema, Viva Films	₱323 million
15	2011	Enteng Ng Ina Mo	Star Cinema, OctoArts Films, M-Zet Productions, APT Entertainment	₱272 million
16	2022	Deleter	Viva Films, Pelikula Red, Top Story	₱270 million
17	2014	Feng Shui 2	Star Cinema, K Productions	₱235 million
18	2008	Ang Tanging Ina N'yong Lahat	Star Cinema	₱229.9 million
19	2023	Mallari	Mentorque Productions, Clever Minds Inc.	₱225 million
20	2012	One More Try	Star Cinema	₱213 million
21	2010	Ang Tanging Ina Mo (Last na 'To!)	Star Cinema	₱210 million
22	2013	Pagpag: Siyam na Buhay	Star Cinema, Regal Entertainment	₱188 million
23	2006	Kasal, Kasali, Kasalo	Star Cinema	₱187 million
24	2010	Si Agimat at Si Enteng Kabisote	GMA Pictures, OctoArts Films, M-Zet Productions, APT Entertainment, Imus Productions	₱171 million
25	2022	Partners in Crime	Star Cinema, Viva Films	₱168 million
26	2000	Tanging Yaman	Star Cinema	₱167 million
27	2005	Enteng Kabisote 2: Okay Ka, Fairy Ko	OctoArts Films, M-Zet Productions	₱158 million
28	2012	Si Agimat, si Enteng Kabisote at si Ako	GMA Pictures, OctoArts Films, M-Zet Productions, APT Entertainment, Imus Productions	₱152 million
29	2007	Sakal, Sakali, Saklolo	Star Cinema	₱150 million
30	2006	Enteng Kabisote 3: Okay Ka, Fairy Ko	OctoArts Films, M-Zet Productions	₱144 million
31	2014	My Big Bossing	OctoArts Films, M-Zet Productions, APT Entertainment	₱140 million
32	2011	Segunda Mano	Star Cinema, AgostoDos Pictures, MJM Productions	₱138.7 million
33	2014	English Only, Please	Quantum Films, MJM Productions, Tuko Film Productions, Buchi Boy Films	₱135 million
34	2004	Enteng Kabisote 1: Okay Ka, Fairy Ko	OctoArts Films, M-Zet Productions	₱130 million
35	2015	Haunted Mansion	Regal Entertainment	₱128 million
36	1998	Jose Rizal	GMA Pictures	₱125 million
37	2010	Dalaw	Star Cinema, CineMedia, MJM Productions	₱125 million
38	2016	Vince and Kath and James	Star Cinema	₱123 million
39	2009	I Love You, Goodbye	Star Cinema	₱120 million
40	2014	Kubot: The Aswang Chronicles 2	GMA Pictures, Reality Entertainment, Mothership, Inc., AgostoDos Pictures, PostManila	₱120 million
40	2008	Shake, Rattle & Roll X	Regal Entertainment, Regal Multimedia, Inc.	₱119 million
42	2008	Iskul Bukol 20 Years After	OctoArts Films, M-Zet Productions, APT Entertainment	₱116 million
43	2016	Die Beautiful	Regal Entertainment, Octobertrain Films, The IdeaFirst Company	₱110 million
44	2009	Ang Panday (2009)	GMA Pictures, Imus Productions	₱108 million
45	2018	Aurora	Viva Films, Aliud Entertainment	₱107 million
46	2011	Ang Panday 2	GMA Pictures, Imus Productions	₱105.6 million

Note: All figures are in Philippine Peso.

== Combined box office gross by edition ==
The following is the combined box office gross for all entry films by edition.

Festival	Year	Box office	Ref.
44th	2018	₱1.061 billion	
45th	2019	₱955 million	
46th	2020	Below ₱50 million	
47th	2021	At least ₱50 million (Note: Earnings reportedly surpassed the previous edition)	
48th	2022	₱500 million	
49th	2023	₱1 billion	
50th	2024	₱820 million	
