= 31st Luna Awards =

2013 Philippine film awards ceremony

- Date: June 1, 2013
- Site: Quezon City Sports Club, Kristong Hari, Quezon City
- Hosted by: Rez Cortez; Leroy dela Fuente; Lesley Martinez

Highlights
- Best Picture: El Presidente
- Most awards: The Mistress (6)
- Most nominations: The Mistress (11)

The 31st Luna Awards were held on June 1, 2013 at the Quezon City Sports Club. They honored the best Filipino films of the year 2012.

The list of nominations were released on May 3, 2013. The Mistress received nominations in eleven out of twelve categories, only missing in the production design category. One More Try followed with eight.

Both The Mistress and El Presidente dominated the ceremony. The former garnered six awards while the latter won five awards, including the Best Picture.

== Winners and nominees ==
Best Picture	Best Direction
El Presidente; Bwakaw; One More Try; Sta. Niña; The Healing; The Mistress; Thy Womb	Olivia Lamasan – The Mistress; Ruel Bayani – One More Try; Jun Lana – Bwakaw; Mark Meily – El Presidente; Chito Roño – The Healing
Best Actor	Best Actress
John Lloyd Cruz – The Mistress; Dingdong Dantes – One More Try; Eddie Garcia – Bwakaw; Coco Martin – Sta. Niña; Aga Muhlach – Of All the Things	Angel Locsin – One More Try; Bea Alonzo – The Mistress; Nora Aunor – Thy Womb; Angelica Panganiban – Every Breath U Take; Pokwang – A Mother's Story; Vilma Santos – The Healing
Best Supporting Actor	Best Supporting Actress
Ronaldo Valdez – The Mistress; Rez Cortez – Bwakaw; Albert Martinez – Born to Love You; Zanjoe Marudo – One More Try	Hilda Koronel – The Mistress; Andi Eigenmann – A Secret Affair; Anita Linda – Sta. Niña; Daria Ramirez – A Mother's Story; Eula Valdez – Born to Love You
Best Screenplay	Best Cinematography
Vanessa Valdez – The Mistress; Henry Burgos – Thy Womb; Jay Fernando, Kriz Gazmen & Anna Karenina Ramos – One More Try; Jun Lana – Bwakaw; Liza Magtoto & Emmanuel Palo – Sta. Niña	Carlo Mendoza – El Presidente; Hermann Claravall – The Mistress; Anne Monzon – A Secret Affair; Charlie Peralta – The Healing; Shayne Sarte – A Mother's Story
Best Production Design	Best Editing
Danny Red & Joel M.V. Bilbao – El Presidente; Peter Collias & Benjamin Padero – Tiktik: The Aswang Chronicles; Joey Luna – Bwakaw; Brillante Mendoza – Thy Womb; Aped Santos – Sta. Niña	Marya Ignacio – The Mistress; Joyce Bernal & Marya Ignacio – Of All the Things; Jason Cahapay & Ryan Orduña – El Presidente; Vito Cajili – One More Try; Jay Halili – Tiktik: The Aswang Chronicles
Best Musical Score	Best Sound
Jessie Lasaten – El Presidente; Cesar Francis Concio – Unofficially Yours; Von de Guzman & Jessie Lasaten – The Mistress; Jesse Lucas – A Secret Affair; Raul Mitra – One More Try	Albert Michael Idioma – El Presidente; Aurel Claro Bilbao – The Mistress; Albert Michael Idioma & Addiss Tabong – Of All the Things; Addiss Tabong – A Secret Affair; Alex Tomboc – Sta. Niña

=== Special awards ===
Fernando Poe, Jr. Lifetime Achievement Award	Manuel de Leon Award for Exemplary Achievements
Eddie Garcia	Peque Gallaga
Lamberto Avellana Memorial Award
Marilou Diaz-Abaya

== Multiple nominations and awards ==
Nominations	Film
11	The Mistress
8	One More Try
7	El Presidente
6	Bwakaw
6	Sta. Niña
4	A Secret Affair
4	The Healing
4	Thy Womb
3	A Mother's Story
3	Of All the Things
2	Born to Love You
2	Tiktik: The Aswang Chronicles

Awards	Film
6	The Mistress
5	El Presidente
