= List of 2012 box office number-one films in the Philippines =

This is a list of films which placed number one at the weekend box office for the year 2012 in the Philippines.

== Number-one films ==
Sisterakas became the highest grossing film of 2012 despite never reaching #1.

#	Date	Film	Gross (Dollars)	Gross (Peso)	Notes
3	January 22, 2012	Underworld: Awakening	$879,072	₱37,954,461	
4	January 29, 2012	Underworld: Awakening	$583,101	₱24,859,578	
5	February 5, 2012	Journey 2: The Mysterious Island	$604,950	₱25,616,971	
6	February 12, 2012	Journey 2: The Mysterious Island	$397,130	₱16,848,240	
7	February 19, 2012	ÜnOfficially Yours*	$1,679,692	₱71,531,196	
8	February 26, 2012	ÜnOfficially Yours*	$699,872	₱29,888,874	
9	March 4, 2012	ÜnOfficially Yours*	$329,545	₱14,053,941	ÜnOfficially Yours became the first and only Filipino film of 2012 to top the box office for three consecutive weekends.
10	March 11, 2012	John Carter	$823,935	₱34,976,041	
11	March 18, 2012	John Carter	$595,093	₱25,521,039	
12	March 25, 2012	The Hunger Games	$1,453,909	₱62,051,673	
13	April 1, 2012	Wrath of the Titans	$1,459,095	₱62,486,327	
14	April 8, 2012	Wrath of the Titans	$560,733	₱23,943,299	
15	April 15, 2012	Battleship	$1,084,761	₱45,984,537	
16	April 22, 2012	Battleship	$820,373	₱34,845,343	
17	April 29, 2012	The Avengers	$6,580,876	₱277,383,923	The Avengers had the highest weekend debut of 2012.
18	May 6, 2012	The Avengers	$2,839,565	₱118,688,138	
19	May 13, 2012	The Avengers	$1,250,776	₱53,002,008	
20	May 20, 2012	Every Breath U Take*	$593,472	₱25,517,397	
21	May 27, 2012	Men In Black 3	$1,631,741	₱71,220,110	
22	June 3, 2012	Snow White and the Huntsman	$961,528	₱41,659,354	
23	June 10, 2012	Snow White and the Huntsman	$680,939	N/A	
24	June 17, 2012	Kimmy Dora and the Temple of Kiyeme*	$1,103,382	₱46,331,231	
25	June 24, 2012	Kimmy Dora and the Temple of Kiyeme*	$511,847	₱21,667,302	
26	July 1, 2012	The Amazing Spider-Man	$3,303,531	₱138,063,810	
27	July 8, 2012	The Amazing Spider-Man	$2,302,360	₱95,540,112	
28	July 15, 2012	Ice Age: Continental Drift	$1,047,708	₱43,839,351	
29	July 22, 2012	The Dark Knight Rises	$2,365,149	₱98,865,593	
30	July 29, 2012	The Dark Knight Rises	$1,343,156	₱56,245,329	
31	August 5, 2012	Brave	$866,438	₱36,108,370	
32	August 12, 2012	The Bourne Legacy	$2,652,008	₱110,676,250	
33	August 19, 2012	The Bourne Legacy	$965,256	₱40,946,160	
34	August 26, 2012	Total Recall	$684,233	₱28,809,494	
35	September 2, 2012	Total Recall	$330,855	₱13,904,281	
36	September 9, 2012	The Watch	$205,746	₱8,525,682	The Watch had the lowest weekend debut of 2013.
37	September 16, 2012	The Mistress*	$2,573,573	₱106,273,381	
38	September 23, 2012	The Mistress*	$1,239,128	₱51,484,158	
39	September 30, 2012	Hotel Transylvania	$605,806	₱25,181,599	
40	October 7, 2012	Taken 2	$1,550,508	₱64,135,213	
41	October 14, 2012	This Guy's in Love with U Mare!*	$2,989,715	₱123,491,673	
42	October 21, 2012	This Guy's in Love with U Mare!*	$1,210,237	₱49,882,944	
43	October 28, 2012	A Secret Affair*	$1,358,526	₱55,932,553	
44	November 4, 2012	Skyfall	$1,884,491	₱77,256,405	
45	November 11, 2012	Skyfall	$822,024	₱33,664,349	
46	November 18, 2012	The Twilight Saga: Breaking Dawn – Part 2	$4,052,906	₱166,935,145	
47	November 25, 2012	The Twilight Saga: Breaking Dawn – Part 2	$1,674,554	₱68,301,039	
48	December 2, 2012	Rise of the Guardians	$850,922	₱34,612,444	
49	December 9, 2012	Rise of the Guardians	$364,345	₱14,885,424	
50	December 16, 2012	The Hobbit: An Unexpected Journey	$1,348,364	₱55,305,037	

*means of Philippine origin.

== See also ==
- Philippine films of the 2010s
