= Thou Reyes =

Filipino actor

- Born: Joseph Kollins Reyes; March 28, 1985 (age 41); Quezon City, Philippines
- Occupations: Actor, model
- Years active: 1994–present
- Agents: Star Magic (1994–2018; 2020); PPL Entertainment Inc. (2018–present)
- Height: 1.78 m (5 ft 10 in)

Joseph Kollins Reyes (born March 28, 1985), known professionally as Thou Reyes, is a Filipino actor and model.

== Filmography ==
=== Television ===
Year	Title	Role	Notes	Source
1994–97	Ang TV	Himself		
1995	Batang X			
1997	Kaya Ni Mister, Kaya Ni Misis			
2002	K2BU			
2005	May Trabaho Ka	Himself / Contestant		
2007	U Can Dance Version 2.0	Himself / Contestant		
2007	Maalaala Mo Kaya		Episode: "Diary"	
2008	Komiks Presents: Kapitan Boom	Bukol		
2008	Kung Fu Kids			
2007	Maalaala Mo Kaya		Episode: "Bituin"	
2009	I Love Betty La Fea	Hugo Bosini		
2009	Midnight DJ	Helga	Episode: "Bruhang Parlor"	
2010	Midnight DJ	Marcel	Episode: "Monster Valentine"	
2010	1DOL	Buloy		
2010	Imortal	Rafael		
2011	The Kitchen Musical	Thou		
2012	Wansapanataym	Mr. Booboo	Episode: "Remote Emote"	
2013	Maalaala Mo Kaya	Alvie	Episode: "Palda"	
2013	Bukas Na Lang Kita Mamahalin	Joaquin Bernal		
2013	Wansapanataym	Office Worker	Episode: "Fruitcake"	
2014	The Legal Wife	Jon		
2014	Mars Ravelo's Dyesebel	Karlo Kaba-kabayo	Voice only	
2015	Pangako Sa'Yo	Takong		
2015	On the Wings of Love	Denzel		
2016	FPJ's Ang Probinsyano	Bogart		
2018	The Blood Sisters	Dante		
2018	Bagani	Tong-Tong		
2019	Maynila	San Pedro		
2020	Pepito Manaloto: Ang Tunay na Kwento	Daryl		
2020	Ang sa Iyo ay Akin	Ruben Madriaga	Guest role	
2020	Dear Uge	James		
2021	First Yaya	Yessey Reyes		
2022	First Lady	Yessey Reyes		
2022	Oh My Korona	Kobe		
2023	Mga Lihim ni Urduja	Steven "Arki" Padilla		
2023	Walang Matigas Na Pulis sa Matinik Na Misis	Chester "Mukha" Campos		
2023	The Iron Heart	Orion		
2023	Abot-Kamay na Pangarap	Quinito	Episode 371: Lipat Bahay	
2024	Lavender Fields	Jethro Joven		
2025	Incognito	Damien		
2025	The Alibi	George Tobias		

=== Film ===
Year	Title	Role	Notes	Source
1996	Ang TV Movie: The Adarna Adventure	African boy adopted by king	credited as Joseph Reyes	
1996	Cedie: Ang Munting Prinsipe	Eric		
1997	Super Ranger Kids	Tom/Super Ranger Green Dragon		
2009	Ang Tanging Pamilya (A Marry-Go-Round!)	Andrew E. Sicat		
2010	Babe, I Love You	Andrew		
2010	Ang Tanging Ina Mo: Last Na 'To!	Snow White		
2011	Pak! Pak! My Dr. Kwak!	Doctor Reyes		
2011	Enteng ng Ina Mo	Danolla		
2012	24/7 in Love	Sam		
2012	One More Try	Jacq's officemate		
2012	Si Agimat, si Enteng Kabisote at si Ako	Batoktok		
2012	Sisterakas	Bernice's personal assistant		
2013	Dance of the Steel Bars			
2013	Call Center Girl			
2013	When the Love Is Gone	Petra		
2015	Crazy Beautiful You	Dencio		
2015	Toto			
2016	I America			
2017	Loving in Tandem	Jordan		
2018	Sin Island	Emong		
2018	We Will Not Die Tonight			
2018	The Girl in the Orange Dress	Gino		
2021	Momshies! Ang Soul Mo'y Akin!	Kimberly		
2023	Kunwari... Mahal Kita			

=== Theatre ===
Year	Title	Role	Notes	Source
2014	Priscilla, Queen of the Desert: The Musical	Ensemble cast		
2014	Priscilla, Queen of the Desert: The Musical	Ensemble cast	Singapore	
2017	Care Divas	Jonee		
2017	Nothing but Dreams - Virgin Lab Fest, CCP	Richard		
2025	Ateng	Kiwi/Ateng		

== Awards and nominations ==
Year	Work	Award	Category	Result	Source
2015	Toto	Metro Manila Film Festival	New Wave Best Supporting Actor	Won	
