= List of Philippine films of the 2010s =

- List of Philippine films of 2010
- List of Philippine films of 2011
- List of Philippine films of 2012
- List of Philippine films of 2013
- List of Philippine films of 2014
- List of Philippine films of 2015
- List of Philippine films of 2016
- List of Philippine films of 2017
- List of Philippine films of 2018
- List of Philippine films of 2019
