= Kevin Vernal =

Filipino actor and model

- Born: Kevin John Bartley Venancio; 1981 (age 44–45); Quezon City, Philippines
- Occupations: Actor, model, host
- Agents: Ang TV (1994-1997); Douglas Quijano
- Height: 183 cm (6 ft 0 in)
- Parent: Ruel Vernal
- Relatives: Mark Vernal (brother)

Kevin Vernal (born 1981) is a Filipino actor, television host, and commercial model.

== Filmography ==
=== Television ===
| Year | Title | Role |
|---|---|---|
| 1992 | Ang TV | Himself |
| 1997 | Tropang Trumpo | Himself |
| 2000–2002 | Bubble Gang | Himself |
| 2002 | Sana ay Ikaw na Nga | Apollo |

=== Film ===
| Year | Title | Role |
|---|---|---|
| 1995 | Asero | Bentot |
| 2002 | Paki Sabi Na Lang... Mahal Ko Sya | Robbie |
