= Mga Kwento ni Lola Basyang =

Filipino fantasy action-adventure film

- Directed by: Mark Meilly; Chris Martinez
- Starring: Richard Gomez; Paolo Contis; Sam Concepcion; Iza Calzado; Empress Schuck; Rufa Mae Quinto; Zsa Zsa Padilla
- Production company: Studio 5
- Distributed by: Unitel Productions
- Country: Philippines
- Language: Filipino

Mga Kwento ni Lola Basyang (lit. '"The Stories of Grandma Basyang"') was a withdrawn fantasy action-adventure film produced by Unitel Productions. The film is composed of two stories, "Pedrong Walang Takot" and "Mariang Alimango" derived from the short stories of Mga Kuwento ni Lola Basyang written by Severino Reyes. The film would have been directed by Mark Meilly, and Chris Martinez. The film also would have starred Richard Gomez, Paolo Contis, Sam Concepcion, Iza Calzado, Rufa Mae Quinto, Empress Schuck and Zsa Zsa Padilla. It was one of the 8 official entries for 2012 Metro Manila Film Festival but later on, the film sent a request letter to MMDA to pull out of the festival. On October 19, the film was replaced by Thy Womb.

== Production ==
=== Background and development ===
Mga Kuwento ni Lola Basyang (The Stories of Grandmother Basyang) is a series of short stories written by "Lola Basyang," pen name of Severino Reyes, founder and editor of the Tagalog magazine, Liwayway. In 1925, Reyes wrote a series of short stories under the series title wherein he adopted the persona of Lola Basyang, an elderly woman fond of telling stories to her grandchildren. During the golden age of Philippine Komiks in 1949, Pedrito Reyes revived the stories of his father into komiks. Since then, the original magazine stories have been adapted for television, cinema, and published in book form. in 2012, the script of the film was submitted for the selection entries for the upcoming 2012 Metro Manila Film Festival or MMFF. On June 16, 2012, the Metropolitan Manila Development Authority announced that the film is one of the 8 official entries for the film festival. The Greater Manila Theater Operators Association selected the 8 film out of 14 through level of creativity, cultural or historical value, and commercial viability. However, on October 17, 2012, the producers sent a request letter to MMDA to pull-out the film from the official entries. According to UNITEL, they plan to release the two stories as a separate film on 2013.

=== Casting ===
The episode "Pedrong Walang Takot" was first offered to Ryan Agoncillo, but refused to be part of any MMFF film because he does not want to compete with his wife, Judy Ann Santos who also has an MMFF movie. It was then offered to Ogie Alcasid, but is still busy shooting another Unitel movie, I Do Bidoo Bidoo: Heto nAPO Sila!. The role finally landed to actor Richard Gomez. Other casts are Sid Lucero, Iza Calzado, Paolo Contis and Rufa Mae Quinto. The story "Mariang Alimango" is to be portrayed by Empress Schuck, alongside co-Star Magic actor Sam Concepcion and actress Zsa Zsa Padilla.

== Cast ==
=== Pedrong Walang Takot ===
- Richard Gomez
- Paolo Contis
- Rufa Mae Quinto
- Iza Calzado
- Sid Lucero
- Nadine Samonte

=== Mariang Alimango ===
- Sam Concepcion
- Empress Schuck
- Zsa Zsa Padilla
- Alex Gonzaga
