= Super Ranger Kids =

- Directed by: Rogelio Salvador
- Screenplay by: Amang Buencamino; Mike Relon Makiling; Senen C. Dimaguila Jr.
- Story by: Amang Buencamino
- Based on: Mighty Morphin Power Rangers
- Produced by: Lily Y. Monteverde
- Starring: Rodney Shattara; Joseph Reyes; Paul Burns; Sarah Polvireni; Thea "Rose" Tupaz; Ara Mina; Ruel Vernal; Allan Paule
- Cinematography: Claro Gonzales
- Edited by: Dante Nava; Rogelio Salvado
- Production company: Regal Films
- Distributed by: Regal Films
- Release date: June 12, 1997
- Running time: 94 minutes
- Country: Philippines
- Languages: English; Filipino

Super Ranger Kids is a 1997 Filipino superhero film directed by Rogelio Salvador. Released in 1997, the film is a pastiche of the American television series Mighty Morphin Power Rangers, the first Power Rangers series, and, by extension, the Japanese Super Sentai series Kyōryū Sentai Zyuranger, which formed the basis for Mighty Morphin.

Programmes from the two franchises had been broadcast, dubbed into Filipino or Tagalog, along with various other tokusatsu programmes, in the Philippines since the late 70s. The various series were popular enough to spawn imitators and pastiches, including Super Ranger Kids. The key difference between Kids and its inspiration is that the primary hero characters are ten to twelve years old as opposed to teenagers or young adults. However, the influence from Power Rangers is obvious even in the logo, with the use of a similar font and the distinctive "lightning bolt" design.

== Cast ==
- Rodney Shattara as Zacky / Super Ranger Red Lion
- Joseph Reyes as Tom / Super Ranger Green Dragon
- Paul Burns as Willy / Super Ranger Blue Eagle
- Sarah Polvireni as Tiny / Super Ranger Yellow Tiger
- Thea 'Rose' Tupaz as Kim / Super Ranger Pink Panther
- Ara Mina as Diabolika
- Ruel Vernal as Satano
- Roem Perez as Batchoy
- Allan Paule as Mikaelo
- Cris Daluz
- Orestes Ojeda as Roy
- Liza Ranillo as Jean
- Cloyd Robinson as Father Eric
- Willy Romero as Gorgon
- Vangie Labalan as Isiang
