= 2012 Metro Manila Film Festival =

Annual Philippine Festival edition

2012 Metro Manila Film Festival 38th Metro Manila Film Festival
- Awards: Gabi ng Parangal (lit. 'Awards Night')
- No. of films: 8
- Festival date: December 25, 2012 to January 8, 2013

MMFF chronology
- 39th ed. 37th ed.

The 38th Metro Manila Film Festival (MMFF) is a part of the annual film festival in Metro Manila, Philippines held from December 25, 2012, until January 8, 2013. During the festival, no foreign films are shown in Philippine theaters in order to showcase locally produced films (except in select 3D cinemas and IMAX theaters).

== Entries ==
In the last week of May 2012, film producers and companies already submitted their scripts in participation with the festival. However, it will still be reviewed by the Metropolitan Manila Development Authority to sort out entries. Of the fifteen film entries submitted, eight were chosen as the official entries. Mga Kwento ni Lola Basyang was one of the eight entries chosen, but the producer sent a letter to MMDA to pull out of the film festival. On October 19, 2012, it was replaced by Nora Aunor's Thy Womb.

Here are the eight official entries:

=== Official entries ===
The eight films with the highest lobbying placement fee paid were chosen to be the official entries.

Title	Starring	Studio	Director	Genre	Reference
Si Agimat, si Enteng Kabisote at si Ako	Vic Sotto, Bong Revilla Jr., Judy Ann Santos	Octoarts Films, M-Zet Productions, Imus Productions, APT Entertainment, and GMA Films	Tony Y. Reyes	Fantasy, comedy, action	
El Presidente: General Emilio Aguinaldo Story and the First Philippine Republic	E.R. Ejercito, Cristine Reyes	Scenema Concept International, CMB Films, and VIVA Films	Mark Meily	Action, historical drama, thriller	
One More Try	Angel Locsin, Dingdong Dantes, Angelica Panganiban, Zanjoe Marudo	Star Cinema	Ruel S. Bayani	Drama	
Shake, Rattle and Roll Fourteen: The Invasion	Vhong Navarro, Lovi Poe, Dennis Trillo, Paulo Avelino, Mart Escudero, Janice de Belen, Herbert Bautista	Regal Films	Chito S. Roño	Horror, science fiction	
Sisterakas	Kris Aquino, Ai-Ai de las Alas, Vice Ganda, Kathryn Bernardo, Daniel Padilla, Xyriel Manabat	Star Cinema and Viva Films	Wenn V. Deramas	Comedy	
Sosy Problems	Heart Evangelista, Rhian Ramos, Solenn Heussaff, Bianca King, Benjamin Alves, Mikael Daez, Aljur Abrenica	GMA Films	Andoy Ranay	Comedy	
The Strangers	Julia Montes, Enrique Gil, JM De Guzman, Enchong Dee	Quantum Films, MJM Productions	Lawrence Fajardo	Horror	
Thy Womb	Nora Aunor, Bembol Roco, Lovi Poe, Mercedes Cabral	Centerstage Productions	Brillante Mendoza	Drama	

=== New Wave entries ===
The New Wave films were screened from December 18 to 22 as a prelude to the MMFF opening on December 25, 2012. This year, the MMFF will continue the tradition of supporting independent films through a bigger, better and bolder New Wave Section.

- Ad Ignorantiam - Armando Y. Lao
- Gayak - Ronaldo Bertubin
- In Nomine Matris - Will Fredo
- Paglaya sa Tanikala - Michael Angelo Dagnñalan
- The Grave Bandits - Tyrone Acierto

=== Student shorts ===
These films were screened along with the New Wave entries.

- Kinse - Nikki Del Carmen, Mowelfund Film Institute
- Lugaw - Nikko Arcega & Minette Palcon, Mowelfund Film Institute
- Manibela - Bobby Pagotan, Far Eastern University
- Obsesyon - Danny Yu, Mowelfund Film Institute
- Pukpok - Joaquin Pantaleon, De La Salle University
- Ritwal - Samantha Fe Solidum, University of San Carlos
- Rolyo - Rea Abalos, Mowelfund Film Institute
- Sonata - Moises Anthony Cruz, University of the Philippines Diliman
- Tagad - Daniel Bautista, University of San Carlos
- Tsansa - John Paul Pepito, Cebu Normal University

== Awards ==
2012 Metro Manila Film Festival Gabi ng Parangal
- Date: December 27, 2012
- Site: Meralco Theater, Pasig

Highlights
- Best Picture: One More Try
- Most awards: El Presidente and Thy Womb (7)

Television coverage
- Network: TV5

The 38th Metro Manila Film Festival Awards Night was held at the Meralco Theater in Ortigas Center, Pasig on December 27, 2012.

Winners are listed first and highlighted in boldface.

=== Major awards ===
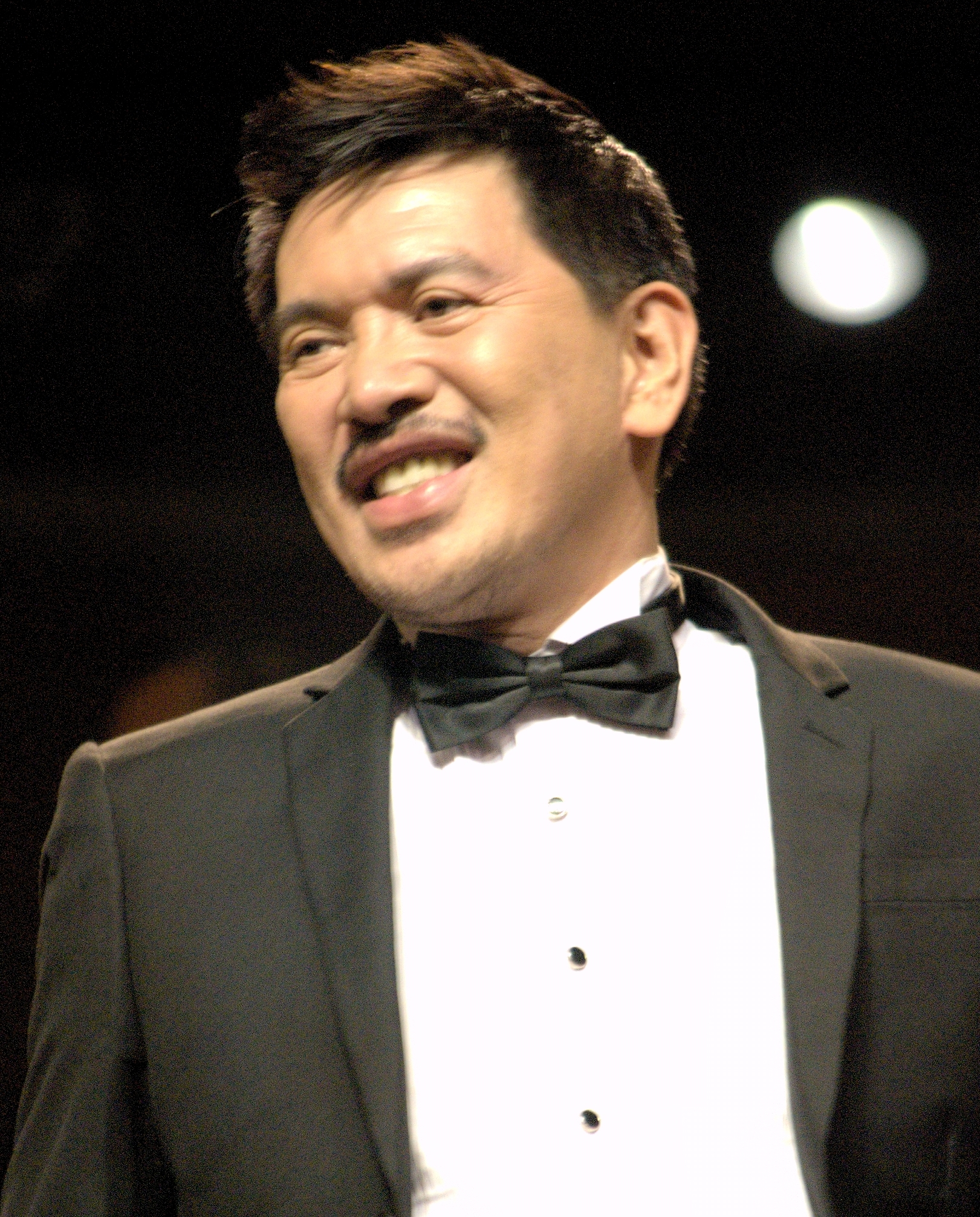
Brillante Mendoza, Best Director winner

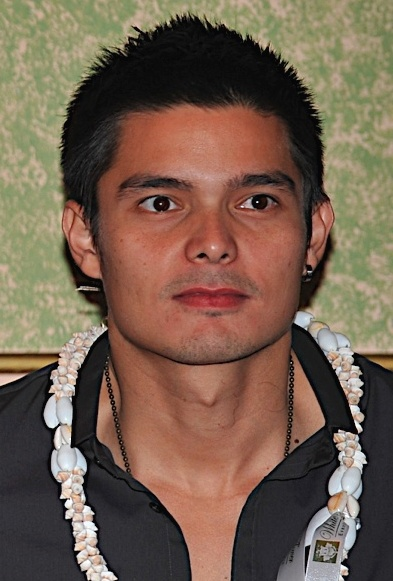
Dingdong Dantes, Best Actor winner

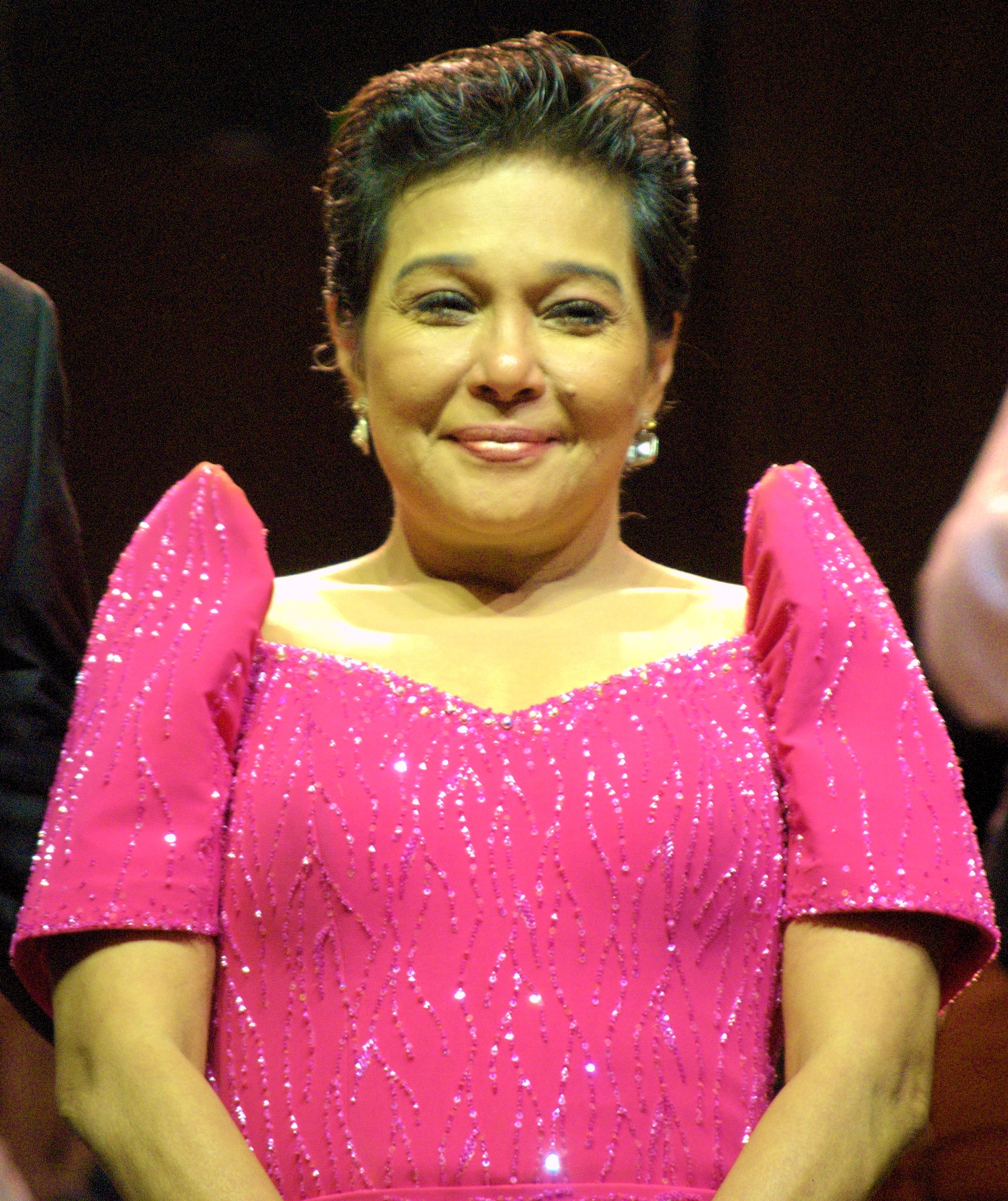
Nora Aunor, Best Actress winner and Female Star of the Night

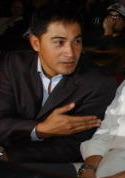
Cesar Montano, Best Supporting Actor winner

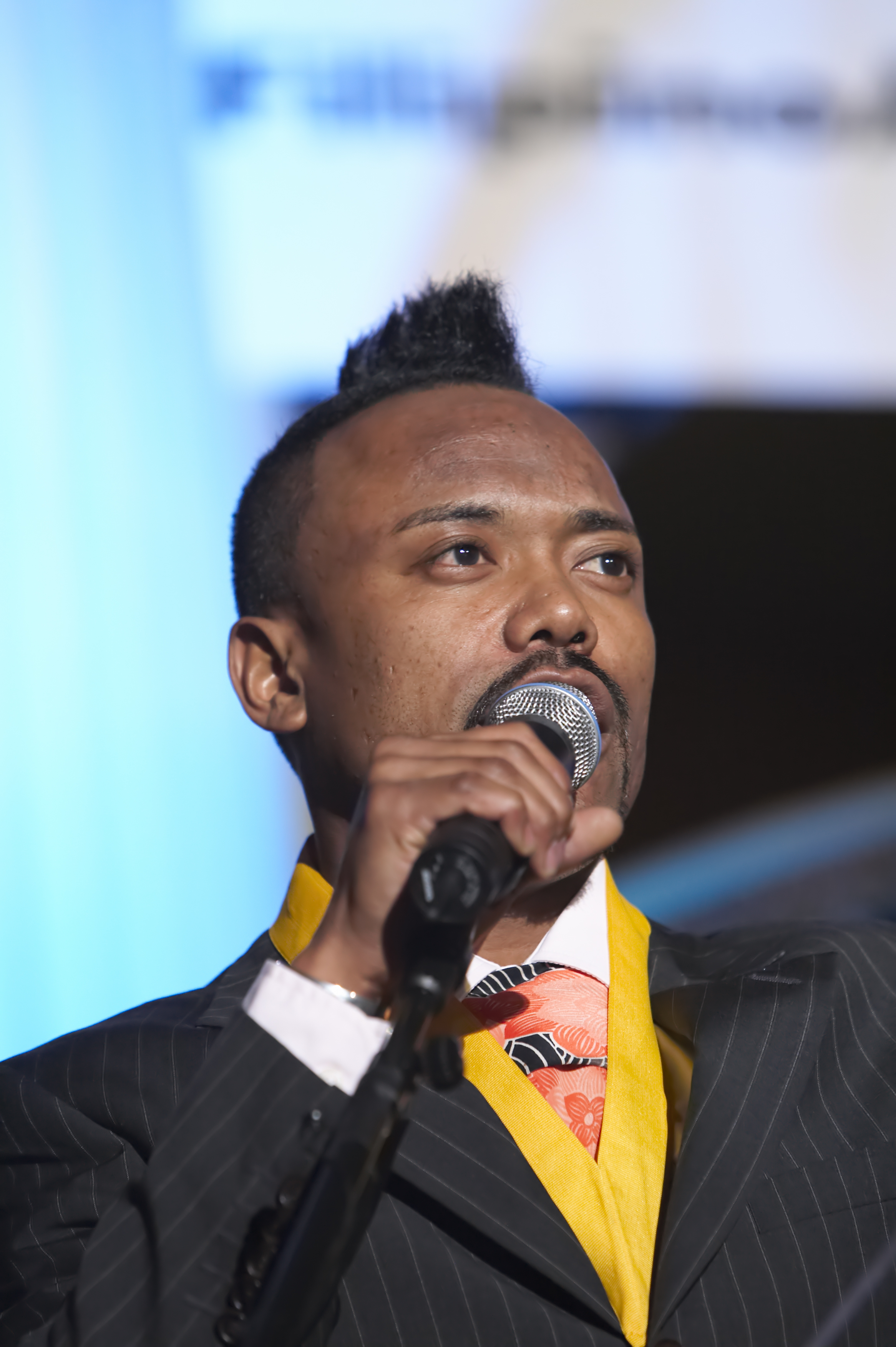
Apl.de.ap, Best Original Theme Song performer (with Jamir Garcia)

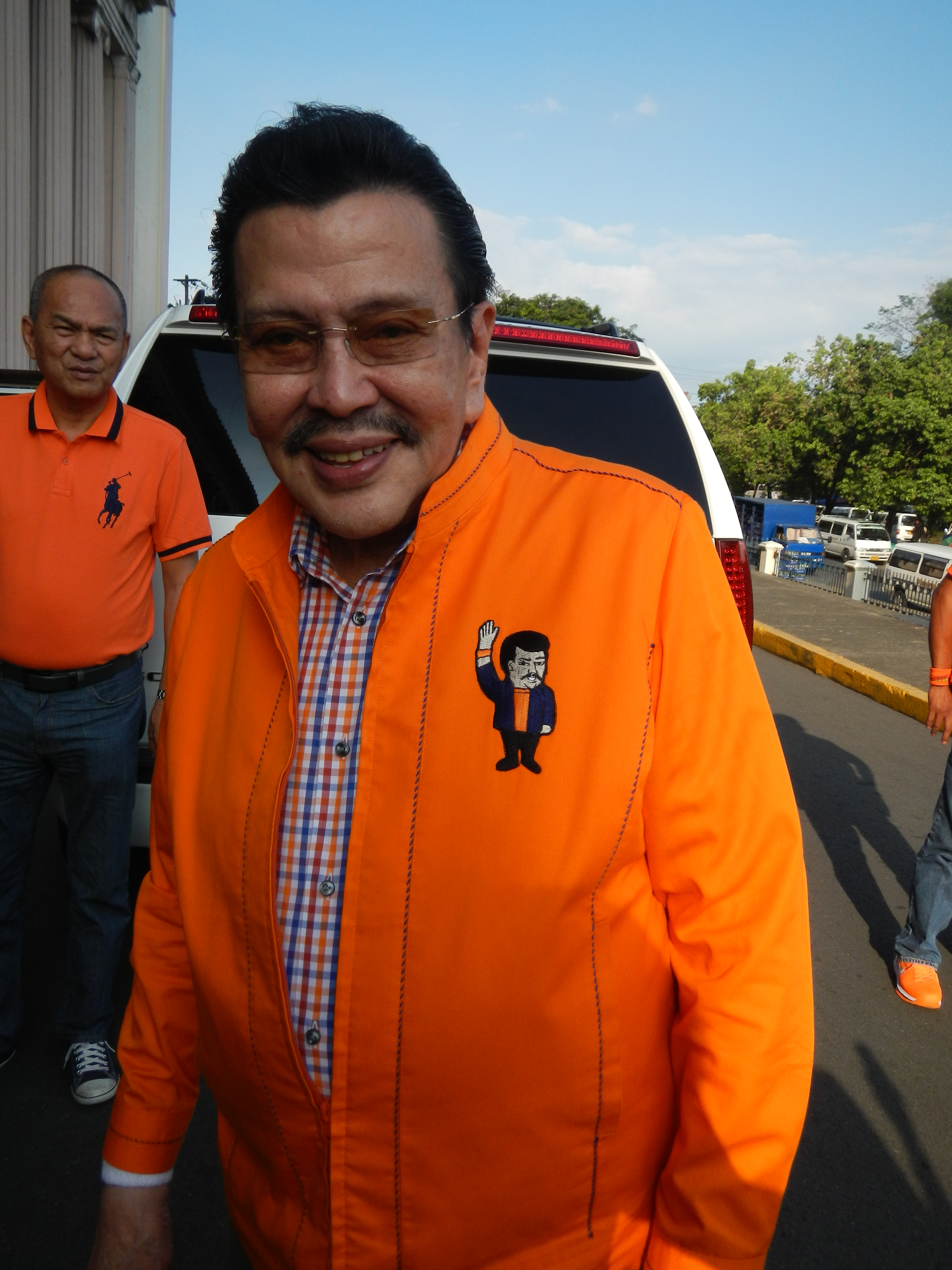
Joseph Estrada, Male Star of the Night

Best Picture	Best Director
**One More Try - Star Cinema**; El Presidente - Scenema Concept International and Viva Films (2nd Best Picture); Sisterakas - Star Cinema and Viva Films (3rd Best Picture); The Strangers - Quantum Films and MJM Productions; Thy Womb - Centerstage Production	**Brillante Mendoza - Thy Womb**; Ruel S. Bayani - One More Try
Best Actor	Best Actress
**Dingdong Dantes - One More Try**; E.R. Ejercito - El Presidente; Herbert Bautista - Shake, Rattle and Roll Fourteen: The Invasion; Vice Ganda - Sisterakas; Bembol Roco - Thy Womb	**Nora Aunor - Thy Womb**; Angelica Panganiban - One More Try; Angel Locsin - One More Try; Janice de Belen - Shake, Rattle and Roll Fourteen: The Invasion; Judy Ann Santos - Si Agimat, si Enteng Kabisote at si Ako
Best Supporting Actor	Best Supporting Actress
**Cesar Montano - El Presidente**; Zanjoe Marudo - One More Try	**Wilma Doesnt - Sisterakas**; Gina Pareno - One More Try
Best Child Performer	Best Original Story
**Miguel Vergara - One More Try**	**Henry Burgos - Thy Womb**
Best Screenplay	Best Production Design
**Anna Karenina and Jay Gazmin - One More Try**	**Dante Mendoza - Thy Womb**
Best Editing	Best Musical Score
**Vito Cahilig - One More Try**	**Jessie Lazatin - El Presidente**
Best Sound Recording	Best Original Theme Song
**Albert Michael Idioma - El Presidente**	**Apl.de.ap and Jamir Garcia - El Presidente**
Best Visual Effects	Best Make-up
**Imaginary Friends Studios and Blackburst Inc. - Shake, Rattle and Roll Fourteen: The Invasion**	**Warren Munar, Benny Batoctoy and Virginia Apolinario - El Presidente**
Best Cinematography	Best Float
**Odyssey Flores - Thy Womb**	**El Presidente**
Most Gender- Sensitivity Film	Gatpuno Antonio J. Villegas Cultural Awards
**Thy Womb - Centerstage Productions**	**Thy Womb - Centerstage Productions**
Fernando Poe Jr. Memorial Award for Excellence
**One More Try - Star Cinema**

=== New Wave category ===
Best New Wave Full-Length Film	Special Jury Prize
**The Grave Bandits - Tyrone Acierto**	**Ad Ignorantiam - Quantum Films**
Best New Wave Actor	Best New Wave Actress
**Allan Paule - Gayak**	**Liza Dino - In Nomine Matris**
Gender Sensitivity Award	Best New Wave Director Award
**In Nomine Matris - Mr. Will Fredo**	**Tyrone Ancierto - The Grave Bandits**
Short Film Category
Best Student's Short Film Award	Most Gender Sensitive Award
**Pukpok - De La Salle University**	**Manibela - Far Eastern University**
Special Jury Prize
**Tagad - University of San Carlos**

=== 1st CinePhone Film Festival ===
Luzon	Visayas
**Monthsary - Polytechnic University of the Philippines**; **Promdi - Don Bosco Youth Center**	**Two Minutes - University of San Carlos**; **License to Drive - Christian Academy of Bacolod**
Mindanao
**The Boy, the Girl and the Traffic Man - Ateneo de Davao University**; **Bulgaran sa Daan - Philippine Nikkei Jin Kai International High School**

=== Special awards ===
Youth Choice Award for Best Film	El Presidente
Female Star of the Night	Nora Aunor
Male Star of the Night	Joseph Estrada
SMDC Female Celebrity of the Night	Bianca King
SMDC Male Celebrity of the Night	Zanjoe Marudo
Youth Choice Award for Best Film	El Presidente

== Multiple awards ==
=== Mainstream ===
Awards	Film
7	El Presidente
7	Thy Womb
6	One More Try
2	Sisterakas

=== New Wave ===
Awards	Film
2	The Grave Bandits
2	In Nomine Matris

== Box office gross ==
The Metropolitan Manila Development Authority was criticized for only releasing the official earnings of the Top 4 films in the days leading up to the festival's conclusion.

Entry	Gross Ticket Sales					
Entry	December 25	December 26	December 27	December 31	January 1	January 8
Sisterakas	₱ 39,194,312.65*	₱ 71,600,000*	₱ 101,000,000*	₱ 200,100,000*	₱ 231,878,445.67*	₱ 342,000,000*
One More Try	₱ 13,160,987.40	₱ 24,400,000	₱ 34,600,000	₱ 76,600,000	₱ 91,278,399.20	₱ 170,500,000
Si Agimat, si Enteng Kabisote at si Ako	₱ 29,393,219.10	₱ 48,600,000	₱ 61,000,000	₱ 91,400,000	₱ 104,458,871.19	₱ 133,500,000
Shake, Rattle and Roll Fourteen: The Invasion	₱ 10,579,339.60	₱ 19,200,000	₱ 20,700,000	₱ 30,600,000	₱ 34,582,606.14	₱ 45,300,000
The Strangers	₱ 4,902,627.00	₱ 7,300,000	–	–	–	–
El Presidente	₱ 4,244,500.00	₱ 7,100,000	–	–	–	–
Sosy Problems	₱ 3,036,408.75	₱ 4,700,000	–	–	–	–
Thy Womb	₱ 908,859.00	₱ 1,600,000	–	–	–	–
					TOTAL	₱ 767,800,000

Preceded by 2011 Metro Manila Film Festival	Metro Manila Film Festival; 2012	Succeeded by 2013 Metro Manila Film Festival
