= Sosy Problems =

- Theatrical film poster
- Directed by: Andoy L. Ranay
- Screenplay by: Des Severino; Aloy Adlawan; Marlon Rivera
- Story by: Annette Gozon-Abrogar
- Produced by: Jose Mari Abacan; Annette Gozon-Abrogar
- Starring: Heart Evangelista; Rhian Ramos; Solenn Heussaff; Bianca King; Aljur Abrenica; Mikael Daez
- Cinematography: Juan Lorenzo Orendain III
- Edited by: Tara Illenberger
- Music by: Teresa Barrozo
- Production company: GMA Films
- Distributed by: GMA Films
- Release date: December 25, 2012
- Country: Philippines
- Languages: Filipino; English
- Box office: ₱25 million

Sosy Problems: It Girls Just Wanna Have Fun is a 2012 Filipino comedy film produced by GMA Pictures and directed by Andoy Ranay. It stars Rhian Ramos, Heart Evangelista, Solenn Heussaff, and Bianca King. The film is one of the eight official entries of the 2012 Metro Manila Film Festival which began on December 25, 2012.

The film is streaming online on YouTube.

== Premise ==
In the film, Rhian Ramos plays Lizzie, the spoiled-rich daughter of a hotelier who is a self-appointed leader of the Sosy group; Bianca King portrays Danielle, the daughter of a politician who is on the brink of being impeached from office; Solenn Heussaff is Margaux, the daughter of the former beauty queen (Cherie Gil) and the best friend and half sister of Claudia (Heart Evangelista) who is also the daughter of a beauty queen (Agot Isidro). Margaux and Claudia were competing one another from beauty to the only man they see who is Benjo (Aljur Abrenica), an all-around employee at the Polo Club.

Their main problem, however, is that their favorite hangout place, The Polo Club, which reminds them all the of the early in life is in danger of being torn down and replaced with a mall that is not so much for the rich and famous: in other words, not a sosy(high class, fashionable) mall.

The “sosy” ladies will do everything in their will in order to stop the Polo Club owners from pursuing their plans, and they will risk everything to achieve their goal.

== Cast ==
Main cast

- Solenn Heussaff as Margaux Bertrard
- Heart Evangelista as Claudia Ortega
- Rhian Ramos as Lizzie Consunji
- Bianca King as Danielle Alvarez

Supporting cast

- Aljur Abrenica as Benjo
- Alden Richards as Inaki Montinola
- Mikael Daez as Santiago Elizalde
- Kristoffer Martin as Israel
- Cherie Gil as Martina
- Barbie Forteza as Becca
- Mikey Bustos as Denmark
- Tim Yap as Jamie Yap
- Mylene Dizon as Bernice Ty
- Robert Arevalo as Mang Ador
- Nova Villa as Lola Patria
- Lexi Fernandez as Stephanie Alvarez
- Ricky Davao as Sebastian Alvarez
- Maritoni Fernandez as Dada Alvarez
- Agot Isidro as Glory Ortega
- Johnny Revilla as Gabriel Consunji
- Matutina as Yaya Siri
- Bianca Pulmano as Anna

== Background and development ==
The film was first announced on May 7, 2012, through GMA Network as they plan to release new films monthly. The original casts that was first revealed in Philippine Star was composed of Solenn Heussaff, Isabelle Daza, Bianca King while the leading men happened to be Aljur Abrenica and Mikael Daez. The newest kapuso star, Benjamin Alves was the latest addition to the cast after signing an exclusive contract to GMA Network and GMA Films. Director Mark Reyes was supposed to direct the film because Dominic Zapata was busy with the Boy Pick-Up: The Movie, but in May, Director Reyes was replaced by Andoy Ranay. The script was submitted to the Metropolitan Manila Development Authority to be reviewed as potential Film Fest entry. On June, the film becomes one of the 8 official entries to the 2012 Metro Manila Film Festival. It will have its regular screening starting December 25, 2012. In September, director Andoy Ranay changed the title from Coño Problems to Sosy Problems.

=== Trailer ===
The films official trailer was released on GMA Network's YouTube account on December 10, 2012.

=== Music ===
The film's theme song is Rocco Nacino's cover of "Learning The Ways Of Love", originally sung by Peabo Bryson.
