= A Secret Affair =

- Theatrical release poster
- Directed by: Nuel Crisostomo Naval
- Written by: Mel Mendoza Del Rosario
- Produced by: Vic del Rosario Jr.
- Starring: Anne Curtis; Derek Ramsay; Andi Eigenmann
- Cinematography: Anne Monzon
- Edited by: Marya Ignacio
- Music by: Jesse Lucas
- Distributed by: Viva Films
- Release date: October 24, 2012
- Running time: 110 minutes
- Country: Philippines
- Languages: Filipino; English; French
- Box office: ₱118,424,018.00

A Secret Affair is a 2012 Filipino romantic drama film directed by Nuel Naval and starring Anne Curtis, Derek Ramsay and Andi Eigenmann. A love triangle story, it was released on October 24, 2012, in more than 200 theaters in the Philippines by Viva Films.

== Synopsis ==
The seemingly happy couple Rafi Delgado (Anne Curtis) and Anton (Derek Ramsay) are shattered when on the eve of their wedding, Rafi suddenly gets cold feet and flees to the U.S. Hurt and confused, Anton starts a relationship with Sam Montinola (Andi Eigenmann), one of Rafi's friends. Sam's obsession with Anton becomes a problem when Rafi returns and wants to work things out with Anton.

== Cast ==
=== Main cast ===
- Anne Curtis as Rafaela "Rafi" Delgado
- Andi Eigenmann as Samantha "Sam" Montinola
- Derek Ramsay as Anton Delgado

=== Supporting cast ===
- Joel Torre as Jimmy Delgado
- Jaclyn Jose as Ellen Delgado
- Jackie Lou Blanco as Catelyn "Cate" Montinola
- Johnny Revilla as Manuel

=== Extended cast ===
- Shy Carlos as May Delgado
- IC Mendoza as Miggy Bernal
- Say Alonzo as Paula Daza
- Gee-Ann Abraham as Katie
- Paul Jake Castillo as Kevin
- Kian Kazemi as Miguel
- Ashley Rivera as Amie Ignacio / Petra Mahalimuyak
- Jocelyn Oxlade as Marielle Ignacio
- Tim Yap as Tim

=== Guest cast ===
- Nina Girado as herself

== Production ==
=== Background and development ===
In March 2012, Viva Films announced that a follow-up to the blockbuster film, No Other Woman, is going to hit the big screen soon. The cast was composed of today's hottest celebrities, Anne Curtis, Derek Ramsay.

Andi Eigenmann replaced KC Concepcion in the film. Since the role was created based on KC Concepcion's age, the script had to be changed and the story had to be made to suit Andi Eigenmann.

Two months before the film's release, its title was also changed from Nothing Compares To You to A Secret Affair.

== Multimedia and merchandise ==
On October 28, 2012, the official movie soundtrack was released with its carrier single "Don't Say Goodbye" by Nina and other classic OPM songs were compiled part of its official soundtrack.

=== Official trailer ===
The official trailer of A Secret Affair was released on September 26, 2012, via YouTube. In the span of two weeks, the trailer already hit over 1 million views. It was also included in the list of YouTube's trending videos alongside popular foreign videos.

An HD Quality trailer of A Secret Affair was also released on the same day.

=== Uncut trailer ===
Viva Films released the uncut trailer of A Secret Affair on October 10, 2012. An Extended Version of Uncut scenes for its press release trailer was released the same day with the music video.

=== Music video ===
Soul Siren Nina performed the movie's theme song, "Don't Say Goodbye". A music video was released on October 10, 2012, and got positive feedback from the online community.

== Online release ==
=== Trailer ===
On September 26, VIVA Films released the official trailer via YouTube and trended right away on Twitter. A Secret Affair, Official Trailer, Andi Eigenmann and #ASecretAffair were included on Twitter's list of trending topics. The film received positive feedback including the impression that Anne Curtis will once again win the FAMAS Best Actress Award.

=== Facebook page ===
A Facebook page was also created to engage fans in an interactive discussion about the movie. News updates, photos, teasers and posters are posted on A Secret Affair's Official Facebook page.

== Box office ==
According to Viva Films, A Secret Affair, which some may have thought a sequel to last year's mega blockbuster film No Other Woman produced by Star Cinema and Viva Films, earned a whopping PHP 20 Million pesos in box-office on its first day of showing on October 24 - a PHP 5 Million pesos higher than the first day earnings of Anne, Derek and Cristine Reyes' movie. On the first four days in cinemas (last October 24–28, 2012), the film earned a total of PHP 55,932,553. On its first six days in cinemas, the film already garnered a total of PHP 100 million, but in contrary to the report, Box Office Mojo confirms that the film only got PHP 95,174,565 on its first week and including the days of the second week run. As of its 4th and final week of showing, the film earned PHP 118,424,018; a sure box office hit but quite low compared to other movies of its genre like In the Name of Love, No Other Woman, The Mistress and One More Try. The film is now ranked as 5th highest grossing Filipino films of 2012 and 17th placed in the all-time highest-grossing local films in the Philippines.
