= Si Agimat, si Enteng Kabisote at si Ako =

- Official movie poster
- Directed by: Tony Y. Reyes
- Screenplay by: Bibeth Orteza
- Story by: Tony Y. Reyes; Antonio Tuviera
- Produced by: Jose Mari Abacan; Andrea M. Bautista; Rowena Mendiola
- Starring: Ramon "Bong" Revilla Jr.; Vic Sotto; Judy Ann Santos
- Production companies: Octoarts Films; APT Entertainment; M-Zet Productions; Imus Productions; GMA Films
- Distributed by: OctoArts Films; GMA Films
- Release date: December 25, 2012
- Country: Philippines
- Language: Filipino
- Budget: ₱30 million (Production); ₱17 million (38th MMFF lobbying placement fee)
- Box office: ₱133.5 million (as of January 8, 2013 - MMFF season); ₱152 million (4 weeks)

Si Agimat, si Enteng Kabisote at si Ako (lit. 'Amulet, Enteng Kabisote, and Me') is a 2012 Filipino fantasy comedy film directed by Tony Y. Reyes. The film stars Ramon "Bong" Revilla Jr., Vic Sotto and Judy Ann Santos in their respective title roles. A crossover of the Agimat and Enteng Kabisote film franchises, it is the ninth movie installment of the Okay Ka, Fairy Ko! film franchise. It is one of the 8 official entries for the 2012 Metro Manila Film Festival.

== Plot ==
Agimat (Bong Revilla, Jr.) has been married to his girlfriend (Sam Pinto) after he defeated a barbarian tribe that speaks in palindrome. They decide to live on Earth, alongside Enteng (Vic Sotto) and his family, to experience family life. Meanwhile, Ako (Judy Ann Santos) is a fairy disguised as an environmental activist along with her minions, including a pink Hulk (John Lapus).

Soon after, octopus-looking aliens arrive, infecting and enslaving the barbarian tribe Agimat defeated, turning them into monsters in an attempt to conquer and pollute Earth. Now it is up to Enteng, Agimat and Ako to defeat them, much to the chagrin of the men's respective wives who desire peace.

== Production ==
The movie was first announced in early June when it beat the deadline for the submission of scripts for the aspiring 2012 Metro Manila Film Festival entries. The press conference and contract signing for the movie was held on June 13, 2012, wherein five local producers signed. The signing was done at the UCC Café Greenhills and was attended by Orly Ilacad of OctoArts Films, Rowena Bautista-Mendiola and Andrea Bautista-Ynares of Imus Productions, Mr. Tony Tuviera of APT Entertainment, Vic Sotto of M-Zet Productions and Atty. Annette Gozon-Abrogar of GMA Films. It was also the time that they revealed that Judy Ann Santos will act as the leading lady or the namesake Ako. This will be the second movie of Bong Revilla, Jr. and Vic Sotto together following Si Agimat at si Enteng Kabisote. In an interview of Vic Sotto for SunStar, the challenge for them is to create a bigger and more fun movie for everyone. He also stated, "...ang pressure namin ni Bong and Juday ngayon, eh how to put up a very good and enjoyable product and kung papaano namin malalampasan ‘yung huli naming ginawa(The pressure for us is on how we are going to surpass what we’ve done before),". On June 18, 2012, the Metropolitan Manila Development Authority announced that the film is one of the 8 official entries for the film festival. The Greater Manila Theater Operators Association selected the 8 film out of 14 through level of creativity, cultural or historical value, and commercial viability.

=== Filming ===
The film began shooting on July 30, 2012, in Ilocos Norte with Bong Revilla, Jr. On an interview of Revilla on a Saturday talkshow Startalk on August 18, 2012, he revealed that they already completed 40% of the movie. Revilla also revealed that they are the first movie to shoot at the "Kapurpurawan" (white) rock formations in Burgos, Ilocos Norte.

== Cast ==
=== Main cast ===
- Vic Sotto as Enteng Kabisote
- Bong Revilla, Jr. as Agimat
- Judy Ann Santos as Angelina "AKO" Kalinisan-Orteza
- Gwen Zamora as Faye Kabisote
- Sam Pinto as Samara

=== Supporting cast ===
- Oyo Boy Sotto as Benok Kabisote
- Aiza Seguerra as Aiza Kabisote
- Mikylla Ramirez as Ada Kabisote
- Jose Manalo as Jose
- Wally Bayola as Bogart
- Ruby Rodriguez as Amy
- Amy Perez as Ina Magenta
- Ryzza Mae Dizon as Chichay/Elf
- John Lapus as Che/Pink Hulk
- Jolo Revilla as Makisig
- Jillian Ward as Bebeng
- Yassi Pressman as Sol/Winged Horse

=== Extended cast ===
- Jimmy Santos as Jimboy
- Jinri Park as Jimgirl
- Alden Richards as Al
- King Gutierrez as Upaw
- Edwin Reyes as Abawa
- Jeffrey Santos as Punk #1
- Rico Barrera as Punk #2
- Michael Conan as Punk #3
- Jun Cabatu as Cabatu
- Marc Pingris as Sakuragi
- Ronald Tubid as Tubid
- Thou Reyes as Batoktok
- Jimmy Morato as Coach of Eat Bulaga!
- Val Sotto as Coach Meg-B
- Don Pepot as Punong Ibrahim
- Princess Velasco as Queenie
- Nica Peralejo as Nica

=== Special guest ===
- Sofia Aznar as Sofia
- Patrick Aznar as Patrick
- Rez Cortez as Rez
- Kiray Celis as Kiray
- Igiboy Flores as Igiboy
- Derrick Monasterio as Derrick
- Barbie Forteza as Barbie
- Joyce Ching as Joyce
- Anton Revilla as Anton
- Gian Sotto as Gian
- Dianne Medina as Dianne
- IC Mendoza as IC
- Wahoo Sotto as Wahoo
- Ryan Agoncillo as Ryan
- Krystal Reyes as Krystal
- Lexi Fernandez as Lexi
- Kuya Manzano as Alejandro

== Reception ==
=== Critical ===
In a review for Rappler.com, Carljoe Javier declared that the film did not surprise him other than the fact that it was extremely politically incorrect. He also pointed out that the movie had commercials inserted in it and that the storyline lacked a clear narrative.

At ClickTheCity.com, Philbert Ortiz Dy declared "Si Agimat, Si Enteng, at Si Ako is utterly unnecessary. There are already several movies just like it in existence, ones with less blatant product placement and a less skeevy overall tone. The people involved in the picture seem to be producing it completely out of inertia at this point, just going through the motions for another year, hoping to lure in people based on name recognition alone."

=== Box office ===
As of December 26, 2012, this movie had P47,700,000, with Vice Ganda, Ai-Ai de las Alas and Presidential sister Kris Aquino's Sisterakas at #1, which had P71,200,000 gross, earning the 1st-place position for two consecutive days so far.

== See also ==
- Okay Ka, Fairy Ko! (film series)
- 2012 Metro Manila Film Festival
