= Sisterakas =

- Theatrical movie poster
- Directed by: Wenn V. Deramas
- Screenplay by: Kriz G. Gazmen; Danno Kristoper C. Mariquit; Wenn V. Deramas
- Story by: Kriz G. Gazmen; Danno Kristoper C. Mariquit
- Based on: Screenplay by Joel E. Mercado
- Produced by: Charo Santos-Concio; Malou Santos; Vic R. Del Rosario Jr; Kristina Bernadette C. Aquino; Jose Marie Viceral; Martina Eileen H. de las Alas
- Starring: Ai-Ai delas Alas; Kris Aquino; Vice Ganda
- Cinematography: Elmer Despa
- Edited by: Marya Ignacio
- Music by: Vincent de Jesus
- Production companies: ABS-CBN Film Productions, Inc.; Viva Films
- Distributed by: Star Cinema; Viva Films
- Release date: December 25, 2012
- Running time: 105 minutes
- Country: Philippines
- Languages: Filipino; English
- Box office: ₱393,439,711.00 (US$7,821,581.00)

Sisterakas is a 2012 Filipino comedy parody film produced by Star Cinema and Viva Films and selected as one of the eight official entries to the 2012 Metro Manila Film Festival. The film was directed by Wenn V. Deramas and stars an ensemble cast including Ai-Ai delas Alas, Vice Ganda and Kris Aquino, alongside Kathryn Bernardo, Daniel Padilla, Tirso Cruz III, Epi Quizon, DJ Durano, Gloria Diaz and Xyriel Manabat in their supporting roles. The film was released nationwide in theaters on December 25, 2012.

The film broke box-office records in the Philippines upon its nationwide release in theaters. It is one of the highest grossing Filipino film of all time domestically.

== Plot ==
Bernadette "Detty" is the daughter of wealthy silk factory owners, Raphael and Kara Sabroso. However, Raphael secretly also has an illegitimate son named Bernardo "Totoy" with his maid Maria Laurel. The siblings grow close over their shared love of fashion. When Kara discovers Raphael's affair, she kicks out his second family and turns the household against them. Maria's legs are paralyzed after being pushed down the stairs and Bernardo swears vengeance on the Sabroso family.

Twenty-five years later, the siblings' fortunes have reversed: Totoy, now called Bernice, leads the successful fashion brand Ponytale while Detty has lost her family wealth after the death of her parents. When her tailor shop closes, Detty applies for work at Ponytale, unaware of her relation to Bernice who hires Detty and assigns her humiliating tasks as revenge. At a fashion show, Bernice confronts his rival Roselle Hermosa who leads the competing brand La Yondelle and is vying for a European partnership deal. Roselle reveals to have stolen Ponytale's collection, prompting Detty to revise their fashion line using her old designs. The revamped collection is successful but Bernice refuses to thank Detty for saving the brand. Frustrated, Detty almost resigns but Bernice convinces her to stay by raising her salary and improving her work conditions.

Detty later manages to win over a model named Marlon to Ponytale from La Yontelle. The two show an interest for each other but after a misunderstanding at Bernice's house, Marlon is fired. Bernice then confronts Detty about their family history and reveals himself to be Totoy before firing her as well. Some time later, Roselle persuades Detty to work for her at La Yondelle. Bernice realizes his design partner James was a mole for La Yondelle and tries to convince Detty to return to Ponytale but fails.

As La Yondelle's sales increase thanks to Detty's designs, Roselle's father Simon wishes to replace Roselle with her as CEO. Envious, Roselle orders James to eliminate Detty. He directs Detty and her daughters to an abandoned warehouse where they are ambushed by James and his thugs. Roselle confronts the Sabroso family but has a change of heart and spares them. However, James decides to kill Roselle as well and take over La Yondelle for himself. Bernice appears and takes a bullet for Detty shortly before the police arrive to arrest James. At the hospital, the siblings reconcile along with Roselle who donated her blood to Bernice.

In another fashion event, Detty returns to Ponytale where she becomes co-president. Together, the siblings and Roselle team up to create a new fashion line called "Sisterakas."

== Cast ==
=== Main cast ===
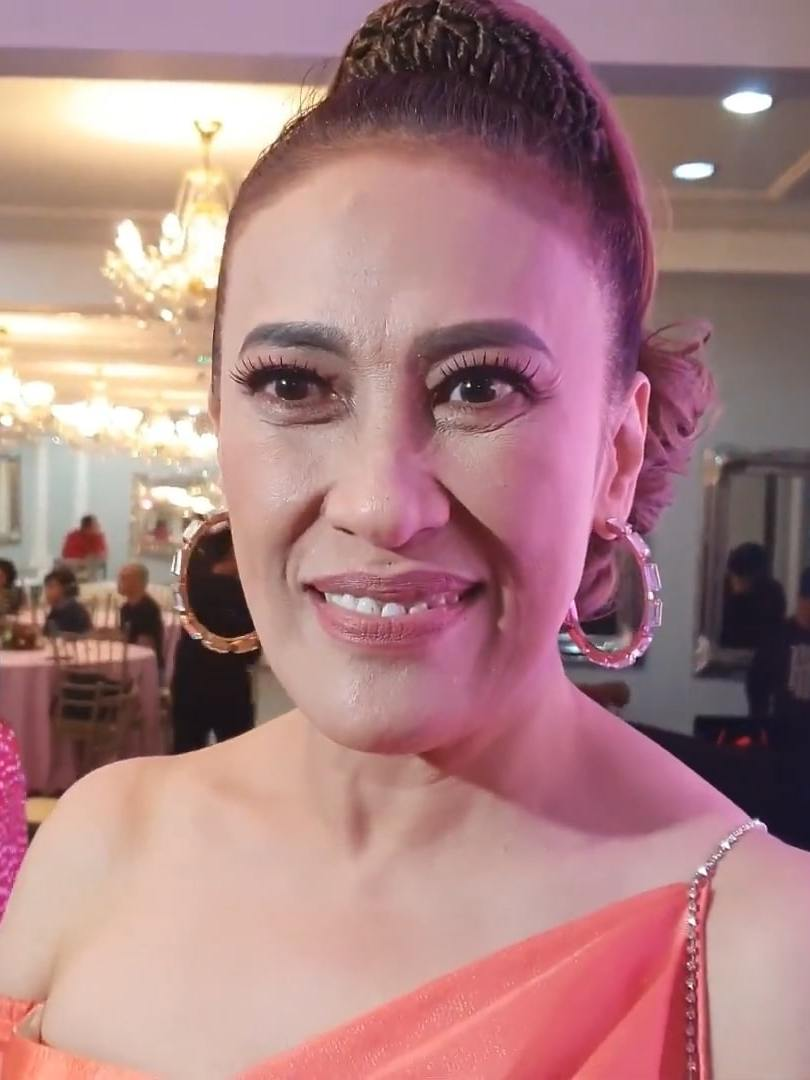
Ai-Ai delas Alas portrays Bernadette "Detty" Sabroso-Maningas.

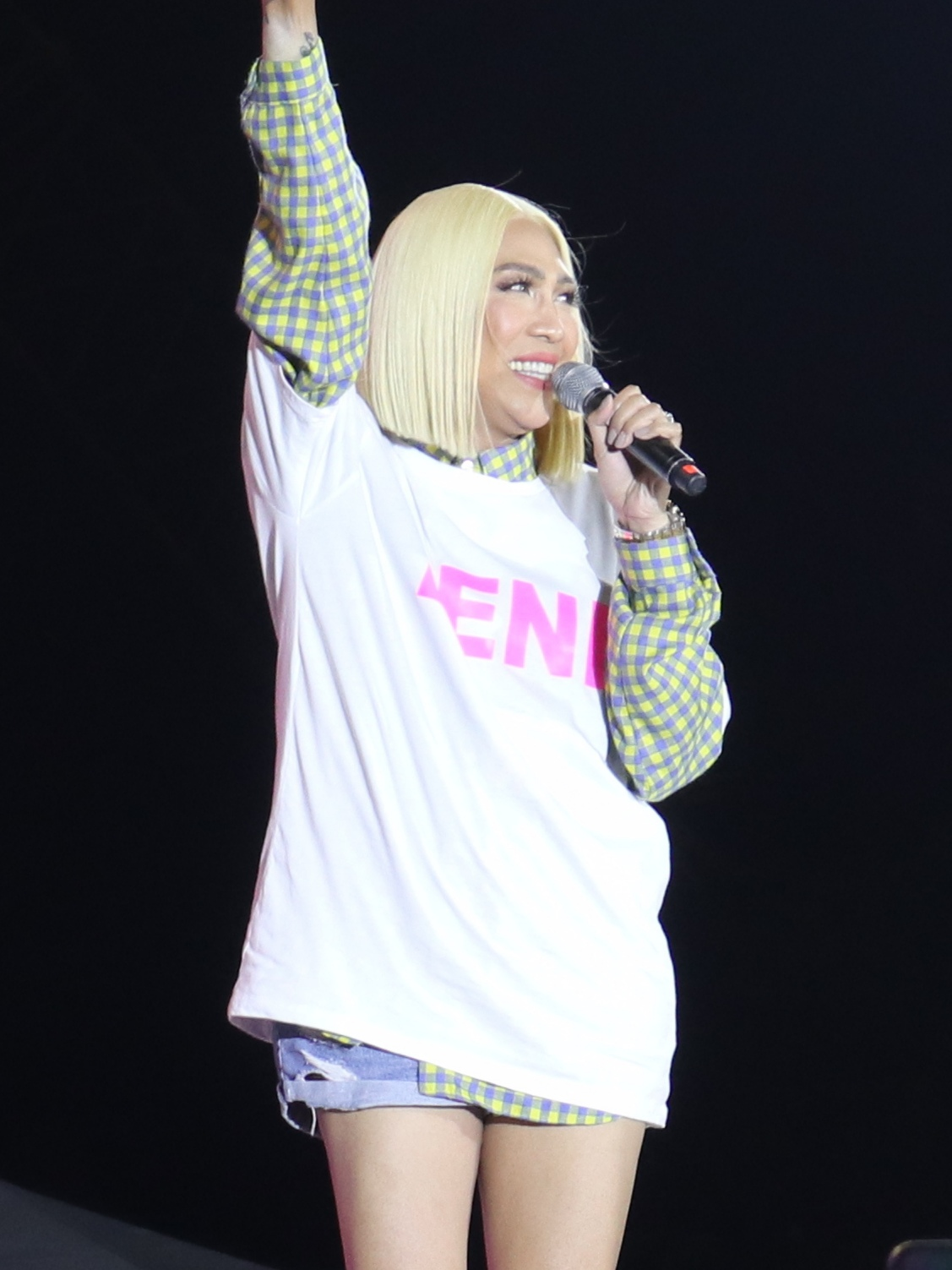
Vice Ganda portrays Bernardo "Totoy/Bernice" Laurel Sabroso

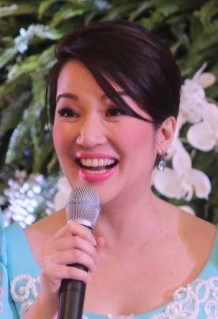
Kris Aquino portrays Roxanne Celine "Roselle" Hermosa .

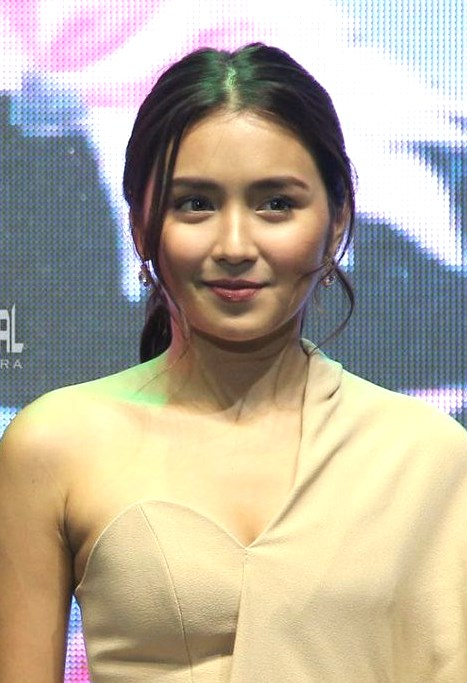
Kathryn Bernardo portrays Katherine "Kathy" Maningas.

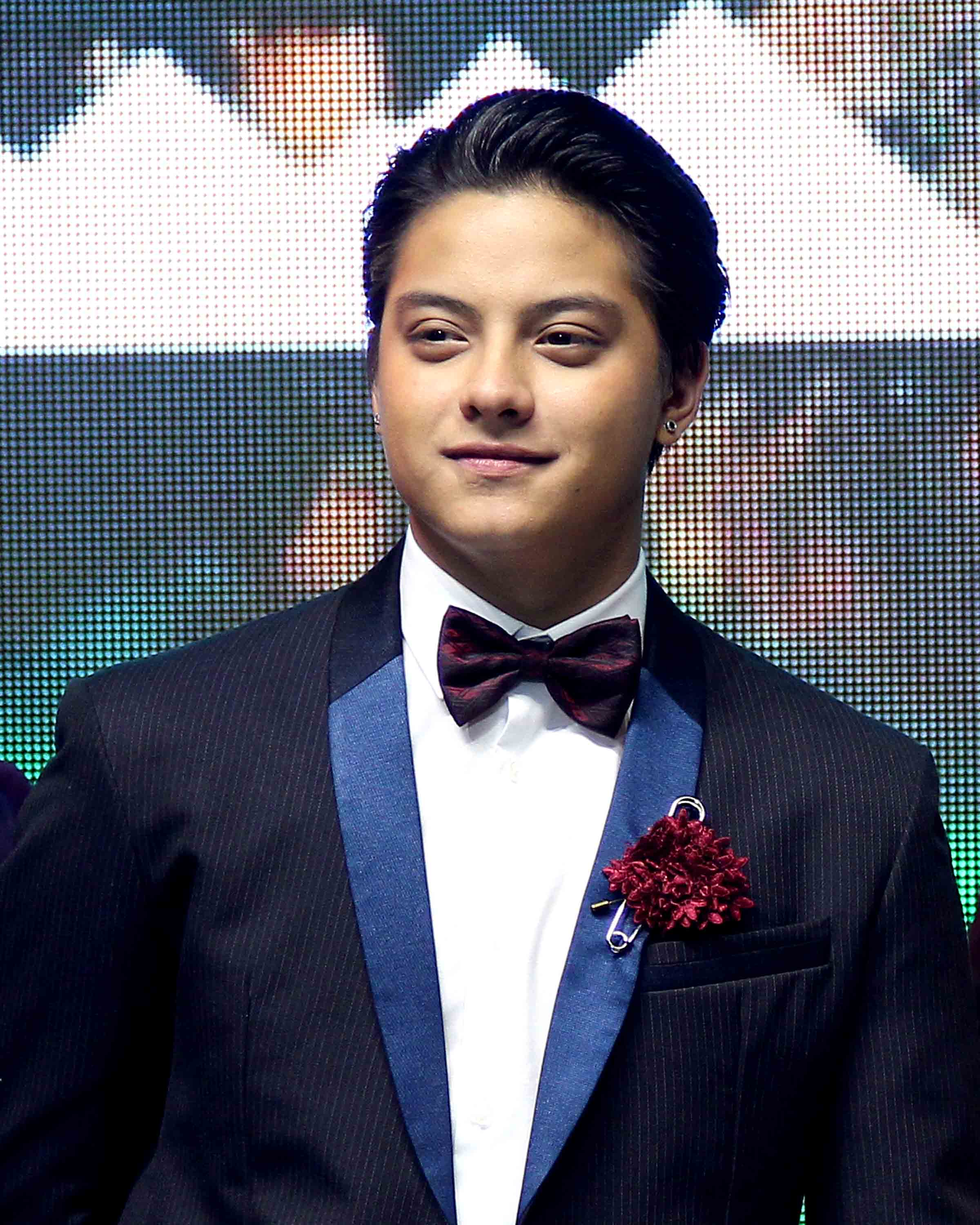
Daniel Padilla portrays Angelo "Gio" Samson.

- Ai-Ai delas Alas as Bernadette "Detty" Sabroso-Maningas (Raphael and Kara Sabroso's oldest daughter)
- Vice Ganda as Bernardo "Totoy" Laurel Sabroso / Bernice Laurel (Raphael Sabroso and Maria Laurel's younger son)
- Kris Aquino as Roxanne Celine "Roselle" Hermosa (Simon Hermosa's oldest daughter)

=== Supporting cast ===
- Tirso Cruz III as Simon Hermosa (father of Roxanne Celine "Roselle")
- Gloria Diaz as Maria Laurel (mother of Bernardo "Totoy")
- DJ Durano as James
- Kathryn Bernardo as Katherine "Kathy" S. Maningas (Bernadette Sabroso-Maningas's oldest daughter)
- Daniel Padilla as Angelo "Gio" Samson
- Xyriel Manabat as Cindy S. Maningas (Bernadette Sabroso-Maningas's younger daughter)
- Daniel Matsunaga as Marlon
- Wilma Doesnt as Jessie
- Thou Reyes as Tany
- Tess Antonio as Leah
- Joey Paras† as Bonbon
- Joy Viado† as Bing Cristobal
- Negi as Snow White
- Tom Doromal as Angelo's school friend
- Marnie Lapus as Mrs. Francisco

=== Special participation ===
- Melai Cantiveros as Janet (Bernice's old executive assistant)
- Maliksi Morales as young Bernardo "Totoy" Laurel Sabroso
- Abby Bautista as young Bernadette Sabroso
- Epy Quizon as Raphael Sabroso (father of Bernardo "Totoy" and Bernadette)
- Gardo Versoza as Mr. Maningas (ex-husband of Bernadette)
- Rubi Rubi as Kara Sabroso (mother of Bernadette)
- Beauty Gonzalez as young Maria Laurel
- Christian Vasquez as the Policeman
- Luis Manzano as the Waiter
- Haynes Figueras as the Masseur
- Maricor Cuerdo as Lotus Feet
- Julius Ongga as the Flower Vase
- Duanne Astrera as Paru-Parong Bukid
- Ten Demapindan as Crazy Aquino
- Khrizelle Gutierrez as Young Stunna
- Ace Morata as Drag Queen

== Reception ==
=== Box office ===
In its second day, Sisterakas doubled its lead against its closest competitor, Si Agimat, Si Enteng Kabisote, at Si Ako. Sisterakas has turned a nationwide gross of P71.2 million at the close of screening of Metro Manila and provincial theaters.

According to Kris Aquino's official Twitter account, she reported that Sisterakas grossed P207.3 million after its first seven days in theaters. In comparison, The Unkabogable Praybeyt Benjamin, the highest-grossing Philippine film at the time, grossed P200 million after eight days in theaters nationwide.

At the closing of screening in nationwide theaters on January 2, Sisterakas had earned P265,765,433.26 in nine days. This was reported by Kris Aquino via her official Twitter account, saying she is very pleased for the positive reviews of the film. The nine-day earnings of the movie places itself at the top five all-time highest-grossing Philippine film of all time.

According to Kris Aquino via her official Twitter account, she reported that Sisterakas grossed P283,467,640.89 in 10 days. It officially surpassed the record of then-second all-time highest-grossing Philippine of all time, No Other Woman, which stars Anne Curtis. Also released by Star Cinema and Viva Films, No Other Woman has a total box-office take of P278.39 million, according to the data gathered from Box Office Mojo. Sisterakas now places itself on the second spot behind from The Unkabogable Praybeyt Benjamin in the list of the Philippines' all-time box-office films. Also directed by Wenn V. Deramas and stars Vice Ganda, Praybeyt Benjamin earned P331.61 million after its local theatrical run, according from Box Office Mojo. Vice Ganda currently holds the distinction of starring in three of the five highest-grossing Filipino films of all time.

After nearly eleven days in cinemas, Sisterakas turned in a nationwide gross of P300,263,229.84. This is confirmed by Kris Aquino's official Twitter account. It has since then the second film to breach P300 million of gross ticket sales after Praybeyt Benjamin, which has total gross of P331.61 million after its local theatrical run.

After almost 12 days in nationwide cinemas, Sisterakas closes the gap for all-time highest-grossing Philippine film. It has turned in a nationwide gross of P320,112,364.28 and is on set to dethrone Praybeyt Benjamin as the highest-grossing film of all-time. Starred by Vice Ganda and jointly produced by Star Cinema and Viva Films, Praybeyt Benjamin has made a grand total of P331.61 Million of gross ticket sales since its release in 2011.

=== Awards ===
Year	Award-Giving Body	Category	Recipient	Result
2012	Metro Manila Film Festival	Third Best Picture	Sisterakas	Won
2012	Metro Manila Film Festival	Best Supporting Actress	Wilma Doesn't	Won
2013	GMMSF Box-Office Entertainment Awards	Phenomenal Box-Office Stars	Kris Aquino, Vice Ganda, Ai Ai delas Alas	Won
