= One More Try (film) =

2012 drama film by Ruel S. Bayani

- Theatrical movie poster
- Directed by: Ruel S. Bayani
- Written by: Anna Karenina Ramos; Kriz G. Gazmen; Jay Fernando
- Produced by: Charo Santos-Concio; Malou N. Santos
- Starring: Angel Locsin; Angelica Panganiban; Dingdong Dantes; Zanjoe Marudo
- Cinematography: Charlie S. Peralta
- Edited by: Vito Cajili
- Music by: Raul Mitra
- Production company: Star Cinema
- Distributed by: Star Cinema
- Release date: December 25, 2012
- Running time: 102 minutes
- Country: Philippines
- Languages: Filipino; English
- Budget: ₱15 million
- Box office: ₱213 million

One More Try is a 2012 Filipino romantic drama film directed by Ruel S. Bayani from a story and screenplay by Anna Karenina Ramos, Kriz G. Gazmen, and Jay Fernando. The film stars Angel Locsin, Angelica Panganiban, Dingdong Dantes and Zanjoe Marudo.

Produced and distributed by Star Cinema, One More Try was theatrically released on December 25, 2012, as one of the eight official entries to the 38th Metro Manila Film Festival. The film received box office success and earned acclaim from award-giving organizations, particularly at the said film festival where it won six awards, including Best Picture and Best Actor for Dantes.

== Plot ==
Grace is a single mother willing to sacrifice everything to save her ill son, Botchok. Grace lives a good life with her son and Tristan, her supportive boyfriend. When Botchok’s rare blood disease became severe, Grace was forced to reconnect with Edward, Botchok’s biological father. Edward, an accomplished man married to an equally successful Jacqueline, is uncomfortable with reconnecting with Grace. Having no children of their own, Jacqueline gives her blessings for Edward to reconnect with Grace to help save their son. The reconnection between Grace and Botchok begins to strain Edward and Jacqueline's marriage.

== Cast ==
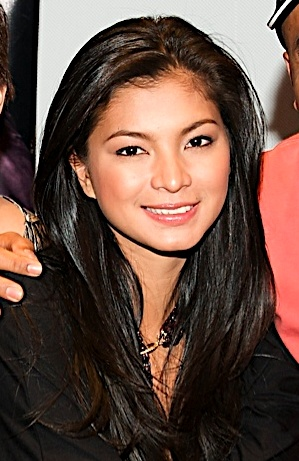
Angel Locsin portrays Grace

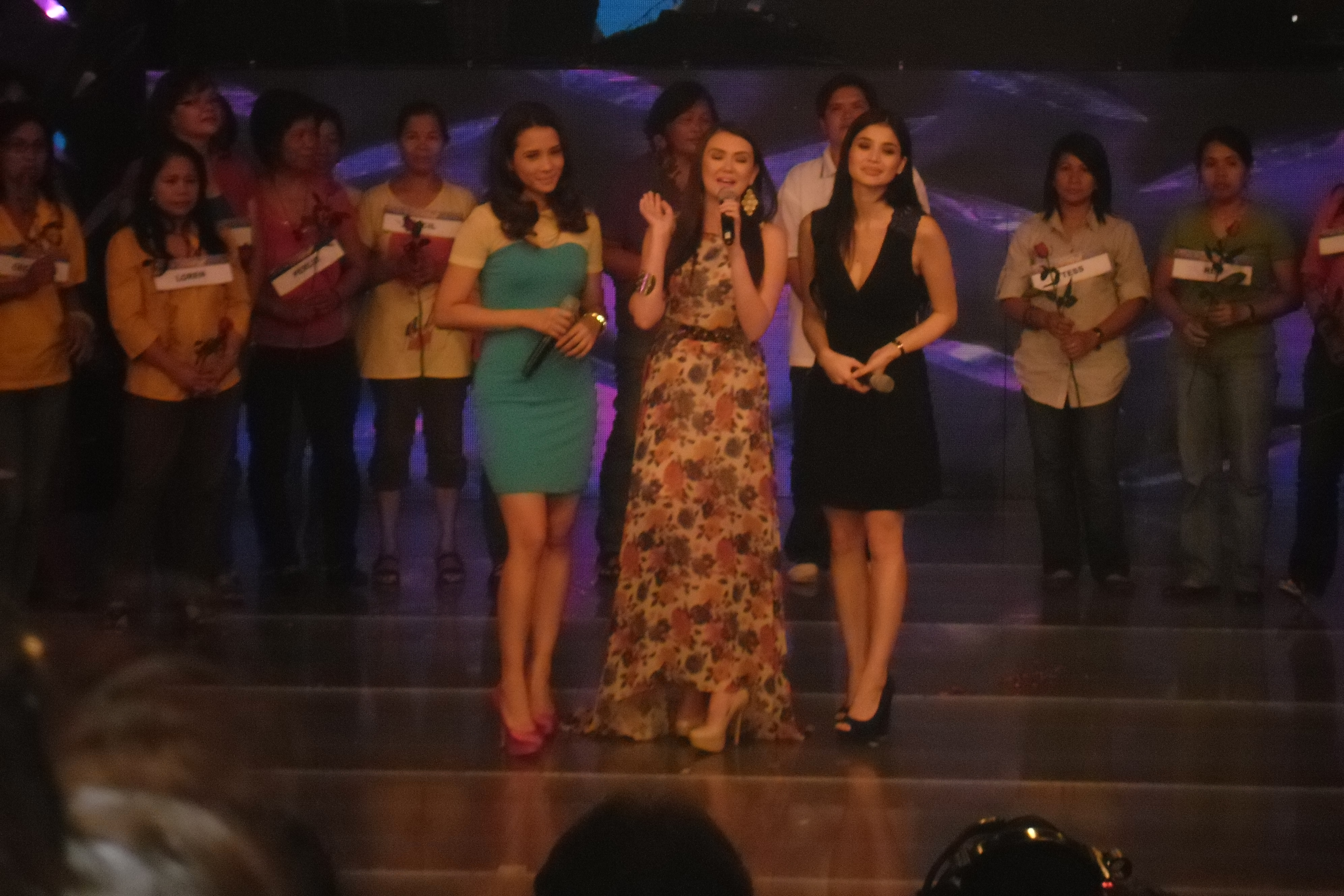
Angelica Panganiban portrays Jacqueline.

- Angel Locsin as Grace
- Angelica Panganiban as Jacqueline
- Dingdong Dantes as Edward
- Zanjoe Marudo as Tristan
- Carmina Villarroel as Dra. Diesta
- Agot Isidro as Marga
- Gina Pareño as Lola Medy
- Mel Kimura as events coordinator
- Malou Crisologo as Jacq's officemate
- Edward Mendez as Archie
- Ian Galliguez as Helper
- Thou Reyes as Jacq's officemate
- Jose Sarasola as Jacq's officemate
- Miguel Vergara as Bochok

== Production ==
=== Casting ===
Angel Locsin, one of the female leads, stated in an interview that she initially hesitated to accept the role of Grace. She had doubts about whether she could portray the role of a mother because she had yet to experience being a mother in real life.

Dingdong Dantes was cast as Edward. According to the director, Ruel S. Bayani, Dantes' acting performance in the horror film "Segunda Mano" (an MMFF movie entry garnering Dantes the best actor award) was one of the reasons why he was chosen for the role. Bayani added that they wanted to cast a new mix of actors for the film to give it a "different flavor". This film entry for the 38th MMFF marks Dingdong Dantes' second big screen project under Star Cinema after Segunda Mano.

=== Marketing ===
The films official trailer was released on Star Cinema's YouTube channel on November 30, 2012.

=== Music ===
The film's theme song is Angeline Quinto's cover of "Without You", originally sung by Joey Albert.

== Reception ==
=== Critical reception ===
The film was graded "A" by the Cinema Evaluation Board, and it received R-13 rating by the MTRCB.

Speculations surfaced about its uncanny similarity to the Chinese film In Love We Trust, released in 2007. Both movies have similar story lines. The initial booking title of "One More Try", per National Cinema Association of the Philippines, was "In Love We Trust".

=== Box office ===
One More Try opened at third place with a first-day gross of ₱8.8 million in Metro Manila and ₱4.8 million in provinces for a total of ₱13.6 million nationwide behind Sisterakas and Si Agimat, si Enteng Kabisote at si Ako, which opened in first and second place respectively. On the fourth day of showing, the film grossed over ₱78 million, which overtook Si Agimat, si Enteng Kabisote at si Ako which grossed over ₱69 million.

=== Television premiere ===
The film had its television premiere on October 27, 2013, on the cable channel Cinema One.

== Accolades ==
The film was proclaimed Best Picture during the 38th Metro Manila Film Festival Awards night.

Award-giving body	Award	Recipient(s)	Result
38th Metro Manila Film Festival
38th Metro Manila Film Festival	Best Picture		Won
38th Metro Manila Film Festival	Best Actor	Dingdong Dantes	Won
38th Metro Manila Film Festival	Best Actress	Angel Locsin	Nominated
38th Metro Manila Film Festival	Best Actress	Angelica Panganiban	Nominated
38th Metro Manila Film Festival	Best Director	Ruel S. Bayani	Nominated
38th Metro Manila Film Festival	Best Supporting Actor	Zanjoe Marudo	Nominated
38th Metro Manila Film Festival	Best Supporting Actress	Gina Pareño	Nominated
38th Metro Manila Film Festival	Best Child Performer	Miguel Vergara	Won
38th Metro Manila Film Festival	Best Editing	Vito Cajili	Won
38th Metro Manila Film Festival	Best Screenplay	Anna Karenina Ramos, Kriz Gazmen, Jay Fernando	Won
38th Metro Manila Film Festival	Fernando Poe Jr. Memorial Award for Excellence		Won
29th PMPC Star Awards for Movies
29th PMPC Star Awards for Movies	Movie of the Year		Nominated
29th PMPC Star Awards for Movies	Movie Director of the Year	Ruel S. Bayani	Nominated
29th PMPC Star Awards for Movies	Movie Actress of the Year	Angel Locsin	Won
29th PMPC Star Awards for Movies	Movie Actress of the Year	Angelica Panganiban	Nominated
29th PMPC Star Awards for Movies	Movie Actor of the Year	Dingdong Dantes	Nominated
29th PMPC Star Awards for Movies	Movie Supporting Actor of the Year	Zanjoe Marudo	Nominated
29th PMPC Star Awards for Movies	Movie Child Performer of the Year	Miguel Vergara	Nominated
29th PMPC Star Awards for Movies	Movie Screenwriter of the Year	Kriz Gazmen, Jay Fernando, and Anna Karenina Ramos	Nominated
29th PMPC Star Awards for Movies	Movie Cinematographer of the Year	Charlie Peralta	Nominated
29th PMPC Star Awards for Movies	Movie Production Designer of the Year	Nancy Arcega	Nominated
29th PMPC Star Awards for Movies	Movie Editor of the Year	Vito Cajili	Nominated
29th PMPC Star Awards for Movies	Movie Musical Scorer of the Year	Raul Mitra	Nominated
29th PMPC Star Awards for Movies	Movie Sound Engineer of the Year	Arnel Labayo	Nominated
44th Box-Office Entertainment Awards
44th Box-Office Entertainment Awards	Film Actor of the Year	Dingdong Dantes	Won
44th Box-Office Entertainment Awards	Film Actress of the Year	Angel Locsin	Won
44th Box-Office Entertainment Awards	Film Actress of the Year	Angelica Panganiban	Won
61st FAMAS Awards	Best Actress of the Year	Angel Locsin	Won
61st FAMAS Awards	Best Actress of the Year	Angelica Panganiban	Nominated
61st FAMAS Awards	Best Actor of the Year	Dingdong Dantes	Nominated
61st FAMAS Awards	Best Supporting Actor of the Year	Zanjoe Marudo	Nominated
61st FAMAS Awards	Best Child Performer of the Year	Miguel Vergara	Won
10th Golden Screen Awards for Film	Best Performance by an Actress in a Leading Role (Drama)	Angelica Panganiban	Nominated
