= FAMAS Award for Best Actress =

Award presented annually by the Filipino Academy of Movie Arts and Sciences

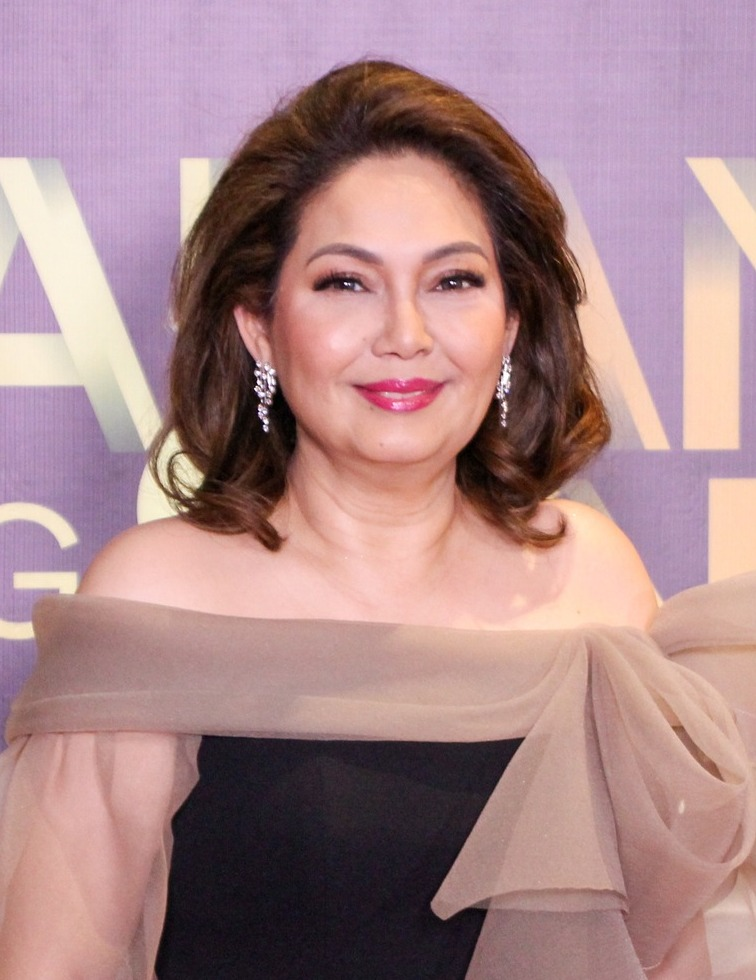
- 2026 recipient Maricel Soriano
- Awarded for: Best Performance by an Actress in a Leading Role
- Country: Philippines
- Presented by: Filipino Academy of Movie Arts and Sciences Award
- First award: 1952
- Most recent winner: Maricel Soriano; Meet, Greet & Bye (2026)

== Winners and nominees ==
The list may be incomplete such as some of the names of the nominees and the roles portrayed especially during the early years of FAMAS Awards.

In the lists below, the winner of the award for each year is shown first, followed by the other nominees.

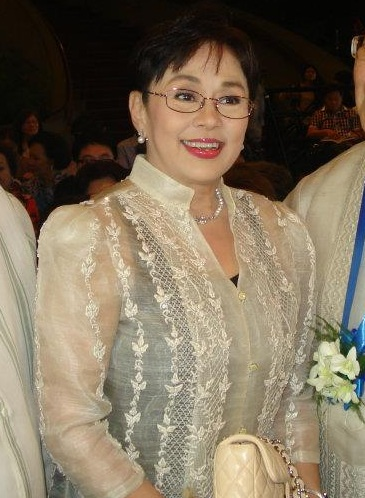
Vilma Santos is the second actress to be inducted into the FAMAS Hall of Fame for her roles in Dama de Noche (1973), Pakawalan Mo Ako (1982), Relasyon (1983), Tagos Sa Dugo (1988), and Ibulong Mo Sa Diyos (1989). She is also the youngest recipient of the FAMAS best actress award and the FAMAS Hall of Fame award.

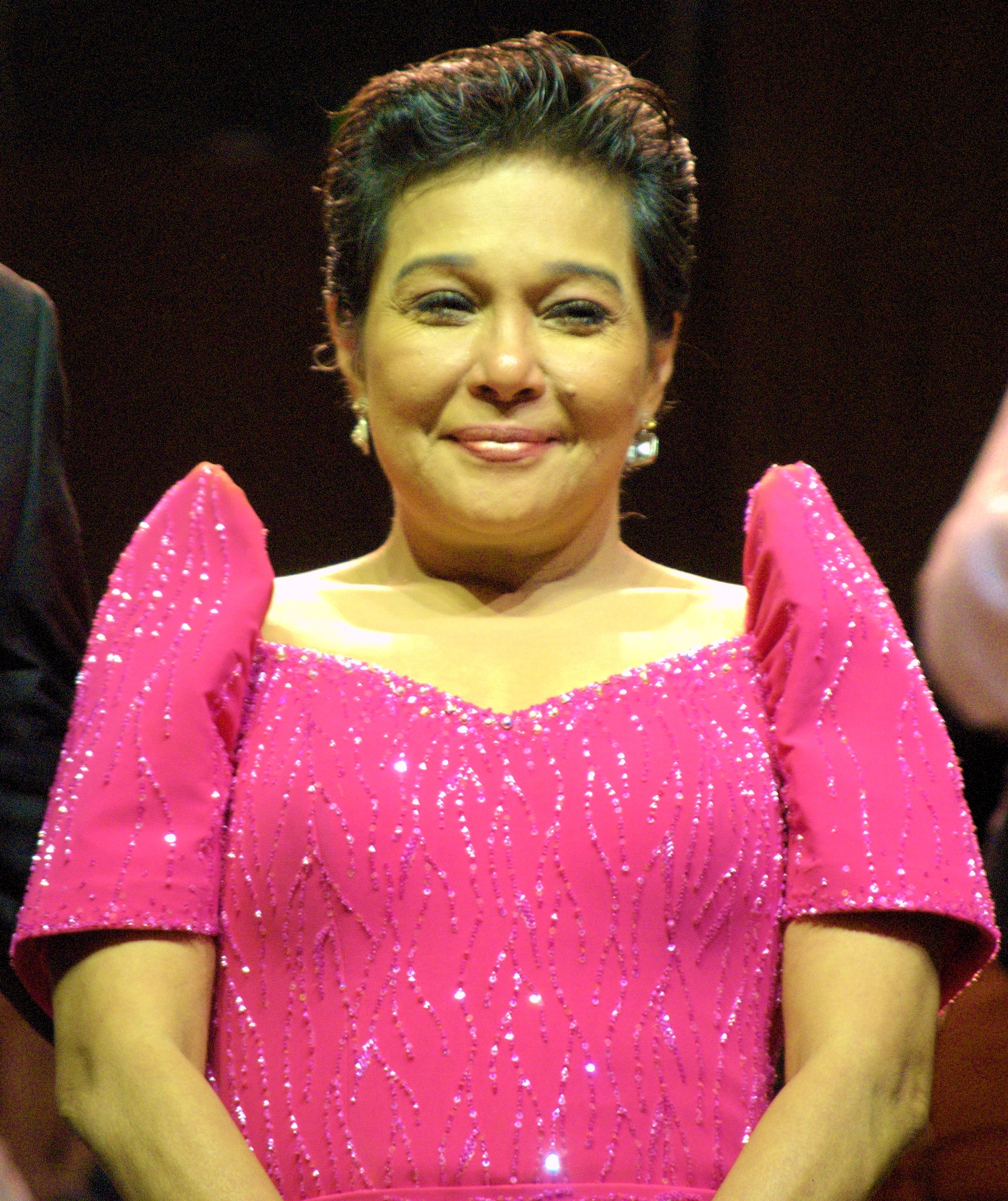
Nora Aunor is the third actress to be inducted into the FAMAS Hall of Fame for her roles in Tatlong Taong Walang Diyos (1977), Ina Ka ng Anak Mo (1980), Bulaklak sa City Jail (1985), Bilangin ang Bituin sa Langit (1990), and Andrea, Paano Ba ang Maging Isang Ina? (1991). She is also the most nominated actress in the category with 17.

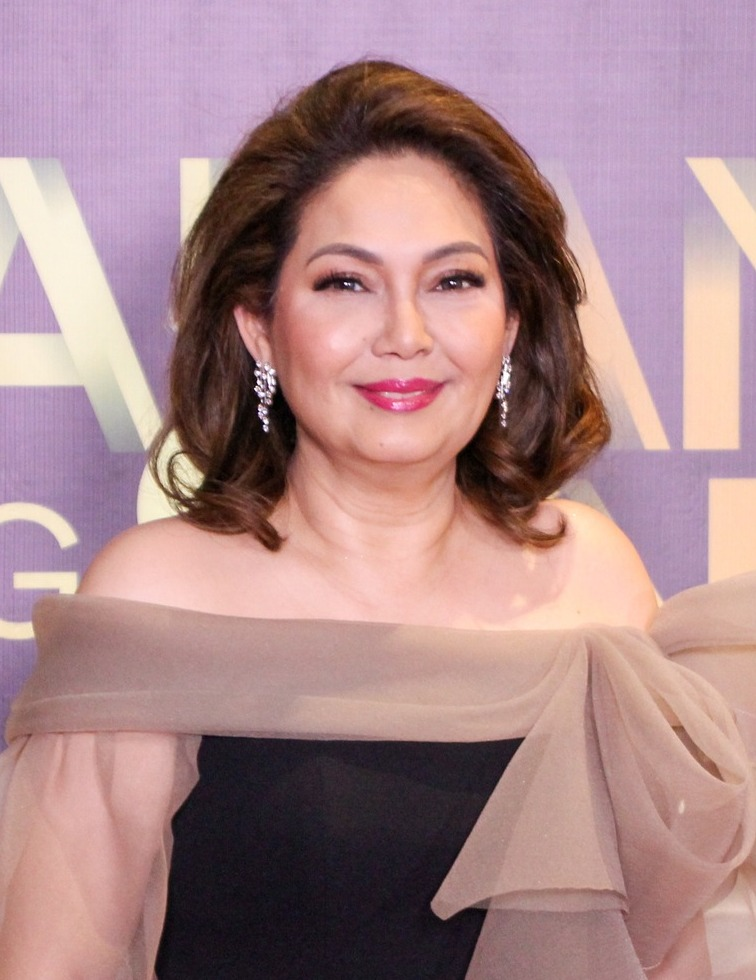
Maricel Soriano has won twice in this category from sixteen nominations for her roles in Dahas (1995) and Nasaan ang Puso (1996).

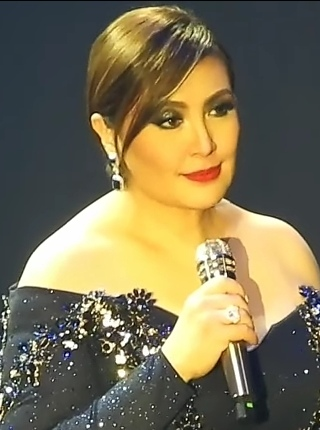
Sharon Cuneta has won twice in this category from sixteen nominations for her roles in Dapat Ba Kitang Mahalin (1985) and Madrasta (1997).

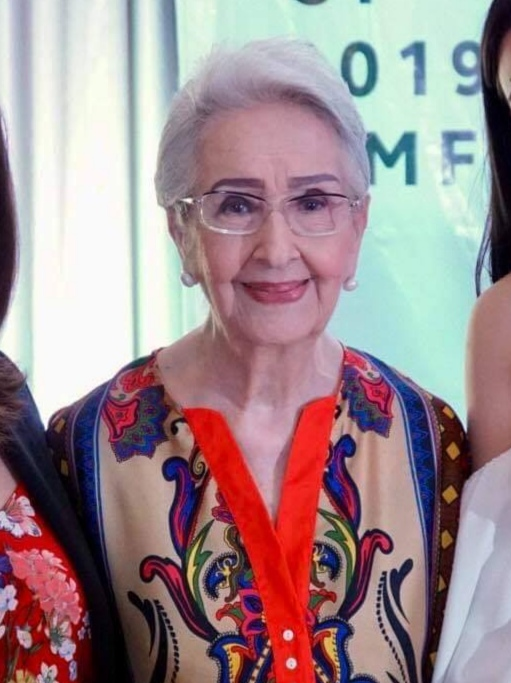
Gloria Romero is the oldest Best Actress winner in FAMAS history for her performance in Tanging Yaman (2000).

- Note – The year indicates the awards for the films of that year when those films were originally released. Please refer to the Academy Awards how they label the awards for the films original release date and not the awards ceremony date.

‡ – indicates the winner

=== 1950s ===
Year	Actress	Film	Role
1952 (1st)
1952 (1st)	Alicia Vergel‡	Basahang Ginto	Orang
1952 (1st)	Anita Linda	Sawa sa Lumang Simboryo	Sabel
1952 (1st)	Celia Flor	Correccional	Norma
1953 (2nd)
1953 (2nd)	Carmen Rosales‡	Inspirasyon	
1953 (2nd)	Nida Blanca	Batangueña	
1954 (3rd)
1954 (3rd)	Gloria Romero‡	Dalagang Ilocana	Biday
1954 (3rd)	Gloria Sevilla	May Bakas ang Lumipas	
1954 (3rd)	Lilia Dizon	Kandelerong Pilak	
1954 (3rd)	Lolita Rodriguez	Jack and Jill	Benita
1954 (3rd)	Nida Blanca	Waray Waray	Luping
1955 (4th)
1955 (4th)	Rosa Rosal‡	Sonny Boy	
1955 (4th)	Emma Alegre	Higit sa Lahat	Rosa
1955 (4th)	Leila Morena	Pandora	Pandora
1955 (4th)	Lolita Rodriguez	Rosana	Rosana
1955 (4th)	Rosita Noble	Torpe	
1956 (5th)
1956 (5th)	Lolita Rodriguez‡	Gilda	Gilda
1956 (5th)	Charito Solis	Ulilang Birhen	
1956 (5th)	Delia Razon	Luksang Tagumpay	
1956 (5th)	Olivia Cenizal	Desperado	
1956 (5th)	Rita Gomez	Via Dolorosa	
1957 (6th)
1957 (6th)	Paraluman‡	Sino ang Maysala?	
1957 (6th)	Charito Solis	Krisalis	
1957 (6th)	Cynthia Zamora	Wala ng Luha	
1957 (6th)	Lolita Rodriguez	Busabos	
1957 (6th)	Rita Gomez	Rubi-Rosa	Rubi / Rosa
1957 (6th)	Tita Duran	Yaya Maria	
1958 (7th)
1958 (7th)	Rita Gomez‡	Talipandas	
1958 (7th)	Alicia Vergel	Anak ng Lasengga	
1958 (7th)	Carmencita Abad	Venganza: Liwayway Magazine 1958	
1958 (7th)	Gloria Romero	Alaalang Banal	
1958 (7th)	Lolita Rodriguez	Condenado	
1958 (7th)	Mona Fernandez	Hanggang sa Dulo ng Daigdig	
1958 (7th)	Olivia Cenizal	Water Lily	
1958 (7th)	Paraluman	Anino ni Bathala	Dolores
1958 (7th)	Paraluman	Bobby	
1958 (7th)	Tessie Quintana	Batas ng Puso	
1959 (8th)
1959 (8th)	Charito Solis‡	Kundiman ng Lahi	Isang
1959 (8th)	Gloria Romero	Ikaw ang Aking Buhay	
1959 (8th)	Lolita Rodriguez	Kilabot sa Makiling	
1959 (8th)	Rita Gomez	Kidnapped	
1959 (8th)	Rosa Rosal	Biyaya ng Lupa	Maria

=== 1960s ===
Year	Actress	Film	Role
1960 (9th)
1960 (9th)	Charito Solis‡	Emily	Emily
1960 (9th)	Cynthia Zamora	Huwag Mo Akong Limutin	
1960 (9th)	Marlene Daudén	Gumuhong Bantayog	
1960 (9th)	Rita Gomez	Tatlong Magdalena	
1960 (9th)	Tessie Quintana	Kadenang Putik	
1961 (10th)
1961 (10th)	Tessie Quintana‡	Alaala Kita	
1961 (10th)	Anita Linda	Naguumpugang Bato	
1961 (10th)	Aura Aurea	Mga Yapak na Walang Bakas	
1961 (10th)	Edita Vital	Noli Me Tángere	Maria Clara
1961 (10th)	Lilia Dizon	Pusong Bakal	Amelia
1962 (11th)
1962 (11th)	Perla Bautista‡	Markang Rehas	
1962 (11th)	Aura Aurea	Kapag Buhay Ang Inutang	
1962 (11th)	Carmen Rosales	Mama's Boy	
1962 (11th)	Charito Solis	El filibusterismo	Juli San Jose
1962 (11th)	Lilia Dizon	Sakdalista	
1962 (11th)	Lina Cariño	Madugong Paghihiganti	
1962 (11th)	Liza Moreno	Sino Ang Matapang	
1962 (11th)	Lolita Rodriguez	Pitong Kabanalan ng Isang Makasalanan	
1962 (11th)	Ludy San Juan	Lakas sa Lakas	
1962 (11th)	Nida Blanca	Oy.. Akin Yata Yan	
1963 (12th)
1963 (12th)	Charito Solis‡	Angustia	
1963 (12th)	Cecilia Lopez	Sa Atin ang Daigdig	
1963 (12th)	Gloria Sevilla	Kami'y Kaawaan	
1963 (12th)	Liza Moreno	The Arsenio Lacson Story	
1963 (12th)	Lolita Rodriguez	Sapagkat Kami'y Tao Lamang	
1963 (12th)	Luz Valdez	Kayo ang Humatol!	
1963 (12th)	Nida Blanca	Naku... Yabang!	Idang
1963 (12th)	Perla Bautista	Patapon	
1963 (12th)	Rebecca Griffin	Ito ang Maynila	
1963 (12th)	Sylvia Lawrence	Zigzag	
1964 (13th)
1964 (13th)	Marlene Daudén‡	Sa Bawat Pintig ng Puso	
1964 (13th)	Amalia Fuentes	Kulay Dugo ang Gabi	Charito / Katrina
1964 (13th)	Charito Solis	Lagablab sa Maribojoc'	
1964 (13th)	Lolita Rodriguez	Andres Bonifacio: Ang Supremo	
1964 (13th)	Vilma Valera	Salambao	
1965 (14th)
1965 (14th)	Barbara Perez‡	Ang Daigdig ng Mga Api	
1965 (14th)	Amalia Fuentes	Sapagkat Ikaw ay Akin	
1965 (14th)	Daisy Avellana	A Portrait of the Artist as Filipino	
1965 (14th)	Gloria Romero	Iginuhit ng Tadhana: The Ferdinand E. Marcos Story	Imelda Marcos
1965 (14th)	Gloria Sevilla	Sapang Palay	
1965 (14th)	Lolita Rodriguez	Iginuhit sa Buhangin	
1965 (14th)	Marlene Daudén	Mila Rosa	
1965 (14th)	Mila Ocampo	Dugo sa Pantalan	
1965 (14th)	Paraluman	Isinulat sa Dugo	
1965 (14th)	Susan Roces	Ana-Roberta	
1966 (15th)
1966 (15th)	Amalia Fuentes‡	Ibulong Mo sa Hangin	Leonore Escodero
1966 (15th)	Barbara Perez	Ito ang Pilipino	
1966 (15th)	Charito Solis	Claudia	Claudia
1966 (15th)	Lolita Rodriguez	Dugo ang Kulay ng Pag-ibig	
1966 (15th)	Rita Gomez	Makasalanan	
1967 (16th)
1967 (16th)	Marlene Daudén‡	Kapag Puso'y Sinugatan	
1967 (16th)	Amalia Fuentes	O! Pagsintang Labis	
1967 (16th)	Charito Solis	Dahil sa Isang Bulaklak	Margarita
1967 (16th)	Susan Roces	Maruja	Maruja
1967 (16th)	Zeny Zabala	Ruby	Ruby
1968 (17th)
1968 (17th)	Charito Solis‡	Igorota	Princess Maila
1968 (17th)	Barbara Perez	Barbaro Cristobal	
1968 (17th)	Boots Anson-Roa	Siete Dolores	
1968 (17th)	Gina Pareño	Elizabeth	Beth
1968 (17th)	Lolita Rodriguez	Kasalanan Kaya	
1968 (17th)	Marlene Daudén	Alipin Ng Busabos	Melda
1968 (17th)	Perla Bautista	De Colores	
1968 (17th)	Rebecca Griffin	Tatak: Sacramentados	
1968 (17th)	Susan Roces	To Susan with Love	
1969 (18th)
1969 (18th)	Gloria Sevilla‡	Badlis sa Kinabuhi	
1969 (18th)	Amalia Fuentes	Kapatid Ko ang Aking Ina	
1969 (18th)	Charito Solis	Ang Pulubi	
1969 (18th)	Lolita Rodriguez	Ikaw	

=== 1970s ===
Year	Actress	Film	Role
1970 (19th)
1970 (19th)	Rita Gomez‡	Bakit Ako Pa	
1970 (19th)	Boots Anson-Roa	Wanted: Perfect Mother	Carla
1970 (19th)	Gloria Sevilla	Dodong Ko	
1970 (19th)	Lolita Rodriguez	Tubog sa Ginto	Emma
1970 (19th)	Susan Roces	Divina Gracia	Lorna / Lorena
1971 (20th)
1971 (20th)	Celia Rodriguez‡	Lilet	Lilet
1971 (20th)	Amalia Fuentes	Divina Bastarda	
1971 (20th)	Boots Anson-Roa	I Love Mama, I Love Papa	
1971 (20th)	Lolita Rodriguez	Stardoom	Toyang
1971 (20th)	Rita Gomez	Pagdating sa Dulo	Paloma Miranda
1971 (20th)	Rizza	Nympha	Nympha
1971 (20th)	Rosemarie Sonora	Cadena de Amor	Sonya
1972 (21st)
1972 (21st)	Boots Anson-Roa ‡	Tatay Na si Erap	
1972 (21st)	Vilma Santos ‡	Dama de Noche	Rossana / Armida
1972 (21st)	Amalia Fuentes	Babae... Ikaw ang Dahilan	
1972 (21st)	Marlene Daudén	Babae... Ikaw ang Dahilan	
1972 (21st)	Nora Aunor	A Gift of Love	
1972 (21st)	Pilar Pilapil	Isinilang ang Anak ng Ibang Babae	
1972 (21st)	Susan Roces	Bilangguang Puso	
1973 (22nd)
1973 (22nd)	Gloria Sevilla‡	Gimingaw Ako	
1973 (22nd)	Alona Alegre	Kung Bakit Dugo ang Kulay ng Gabi	
1973 (22nd)	Amalia Fuentes	Pag-ibig Mo, Buhay Ko	
1973 (22nd)	Boots Anson-Roa	Tanikalang Dugo	
1973 (22nd)	Nora Aunor	Paru-Parung Itim	
1973 (22nd)	Susan Roces	Hanggang sa Kabila ng Daigdig: The Tony Maiquez Story	
1974 (23rd)
1974 (23rd)	Lolita Rodriguez‡	Tinimbang Ka Ngunit Kulang	Kuala
1974 (23rd)	Amalia Fuentes	Isang Gabi... Tatlong Babae	
1974 (23rd)	Boots Anson-Roa	Isang Gabi... Tatlong Babae	
1974 (23rd)	Gina Pareño	Krimen: Kayo ang Humatol	
1974 (23rd)	Gloria Diaz	Ang Pinakamagandang Hayop sa Balat ng Lupa	Isabel
1974 (23rd)	Nora Aunor	Fe, Esperanza, Caridad	Fe, Ezperanza, Caridad
1974 (23rd)	Pilar Pilapil	Isang Gabi... Tatlong Babae	
1974 (23rd)	Pinky de Leon	Ugat	
1974 (23rd)	Rosemarie Sonora	Manila Connection	
1974 (23rd)	Susan Roces	Patayin Mo sa Sindak si Barbara	Barbara
1975 (24th)
1975 (24th)	Elizabeth Oropesa‡	Lumapit, Lumayo ang Umaga	
1975 (24th)	Boots Anson-Roa	Saan Ka Pupunta, Miss Lutgarda Nicolas?	Lutgarda Nicolas
1975 (24th)	Charito Solis	Araw-araw, Gabi-gabi	
1975 (24th)	Hilda Koronel	Maynila sa mga Kuko ng Liwanag	Ligaya Paraiso
1975 (24th)	Nora Aunor	Banaue: Stairway to the Sky	Banaue
1976 (25th)
1976 (25th)	Nora Aunor‡	Tatlong Taong Walang Diyos	Rosario
1976 (25th)	Alma Moreno	Mrs. Eva Fonda, 16	Eva Fonda
1976 (25th)	Hilda Koronel	Insiang	Insiang
1976 (25th)	Pilar Pilapil	May Langit ang Bawat Nilikha	
1976 (25th)	Pinky de Leon	Ang Daigdig ay Isang Patak ng Luha	
1977 (26th)
1977 (26th)	Susan Roces‡	Maligno	Angela Cortez
1977 (26th)	Alicia Alonzo	Tahan Na Empoy, Tahan	
1977 (26th)	Daria Ramirez	Sinong Kapiling? Sinong Kasiping?	
1977 (26th)	Nora Aunor	Bakya Mo Neneng	Neneng
1977 (26th)	Vilma Santos	Burlesk Queen	Chato / Czarina
1978 (27th)
1978 (27th)	Susan Roces‡	Gumising Ka Maruja	Nina Concepcion / Maruja Isabel Sevilla
1978 (27th)	Beth Bautista	Hindi sa Iyo ang Mundo, Baby Porcuna	Baby Porcuna
1978 (27th)	Chanda Romero	Mananayaw	
1978 (27th)	Nora Aunor	Atsay	Nelia de Leon
1978 (27th)	Vilma Santos	Pagputi ng Uwak, Pag-itim ng Tagak	Julie Monserrat
1979 (28th)
1979 (28th)	Nora Aunor‡	Ina Ka ng Anak Mo	Esther
1979 (28th)	Beth Bautista	Huwag Bayaw	
1979 (28th)	Charito Solis	Ina, Kapatid, Anak	Emilia
1979 (28th)	Liza Lorena	Gabun	
1979 (28th)	Vilma Santos	Halik sa Paa, Halik sa Kamay	

=== 1980s ===
Year	Actress	Film	Role
1980 (29th)
1980 (29th)	Amy Austria‡	Brutal	Monica
1980 (29th)	Charo Santos	Pag-ibig Na Walang Dangal	
1980 (29th)	Elizabeth Oropesa	Si Malakas si Maganda at si Mahinhin	Jane
1980 (29th)	Nora Aunor	Bona	Bona
1980 (29th)	Vilma Santos	Langis at Tubig	Cory Jarlego
1981 (30th)
1981 (30th)	Vilma Santos‡	Pakawalan Mo Ako	Anna
1981 (30th)	Alma Moreno	I Confess	
1981 (30th)	Charo Santos	Kontrobersyal	
1981 (30th)	Gina Alajar	Salome	Salome
1981 (30th)	Nora Aunor	Bakit Bughaw ang Langit	Babette
1981 (30th)	Perla Bautista	Kumander Alibasbas	
1981 (30th)	Vivian Velez	Ang Babaeng Hinugot sa Aking Tadyang	Proserfina
1982 (31st)
1982 (31st)	Vilma Santos‡	Relasyon	Marilou
1982 (31st)	Alma Moreno	Diary of Cristina Gaston	Chona / Cristina Gaston
1982 (31st)	Hilda Koronel	PX	Lydia
1982 (31st)	Liza Lorena	Santa Claus Is Coming to Town	
1982 (31st)	Mona Lisa	Cain at Abel	Pina
1982 (31st)	Nora Aunor	Mga Uod at Rosas	Socorro
1983 (32nd)
1983 (32nd)	Charito Solis‡	Don't Cry for Me, Papa!	Rosita
1983 (32nd)	Cecille Castillo	Karnal	
1983 (32nd)	Coney Reyes	Bago Kumalat ang Kamandag	
1983 (32nd)	Laurice Guillen	Nagalit ang Buwan sa Haba ng Gabi	Delza de Joya
1983 (32nd)	Nora Aunor	Minsan, May Isang Ina	Ruth
1983 (32nd)	Vilma Santos	Broken Marriage	Ellen
1983 (32nd)	Vivian Velez	Pieta	Martha
1984 (33rd)
1984 (33rd)	Nora Aunor ‡	Bulaklak sa City Jail	Angela Aguilar
1984 (33rd)	Sharon Cuneta ‡	Dapat Ka Bang Mahalin?	Myrna
1984 (33rd)	Coney Reyes	Ang Padrino	
1984 (33rd)	Maricel Soriano	Kaya Kong Abutin ang Langit	Clarissa Gargamonte
1984 (33rd)	Stella Strada	Puri	Puri / Ligaya / Clara
1984 (33rd)	Vilma Santos	Sister Stella L.	Sister Stella Legaspi
1984 (33rd)	Vivian Velez	Pieta: Ikalawang Aklat	Martha
1985 (34th)
1985 (34th)	Vivian Velez‡	Paradise Inn	Daria
1985 (34th)	Armida Siguion-Reyna	Paradise Inn	
1985 (34th)	Chanda Romero	Bakit Manipis Ang Ulap	Jocelyn
1985 (34th)	Gina Alajar	Ano Ang Kulay Ng Mukha Ng Diyos	Lani
1985 (34th)	Nida Blanca	Miguelito: Batang Rebelde	Auring
1985 (34th)	Nora Aunor	I Can't Stop Loving You	Amy Mercado
1985 (34th)	Vilma Santos	Muling Buksan Ang Puso	
1986 (35th)
1986 (35th)	Dina Bonnevie‡	Magdusa Ka	Christine
1986 (35th)	Jackie Lou Blanco	Lumuhod Ka sa Lupa!	Mercy
1986 (35th)	Jaclyn Jose	Private Show	Myrna
1986 (35th)	Nora Aunor	I Love You Mama, I Love You Papa	Flora Villena
1986 (35th)	Sharon Cuneta	Sana'y Wala Nang Wakas	
1986 (35th)	Susan Roces	Nasaan Ka Nang Kailangan Kita	Rosa
1986 (35th)	Vilma Santos	Palimos ng Pag-ibig	Fina Alzaraz
1987 (36th)
1987 (36th)	Vilma Santos‡	Tagos sa Dugo	Josefina Regala
1987 (36th)	Lorna Tolentino	Maging Akin Ka Lamang	Rosita Monteverde
1987 (36th)	Maricel Soriano	Pinulot Ka Lang sa Lupa	Angelie
1987 (36th)	Sharon Cuneta	Pasan Ko ang Daigdig	Guadalupe Velez
1987 (36th)	Susan Roces	Paano Kung Wala Ka Na?	Ruby
1988 (37th)
1988 (37th)	Vilma Santos‡	Ibulong Mo Sa Diyos	Monica
1988 (37th)	Amy Austria	Bubble's Ativan Gang	Celestina Sanchez
1988 (37th)	Dina Bonnevie	Paano Tatakasan ang Bukas?	
1988 (37th)	Jaclyn Jose	Itanong Mo sa Buwan	
1988 (37th)	Lorna Tolentino	Nagbabagang Luha	Maita
1988 (37th)	Maricel Soriano	Babaeng Hampaslupa	Remedios
1988 (37th)	Snooky Serna	Kapag Napagod ang Puso	
1989 (38th)
1989 (38th)	Nora Aunor‡	Bilangin ang Bituin sa Langit	Doña Magnolia Dela Cruz – Zulueta / Maggie Zulueta
1989 (38th)	Dina Bonnevie	Kung Kasalanan Man	Irma/Jo
1989 (38th)	Janice de Belen	Rosenda	Rosenda
1989 (38th)	Lorna Tolentino	Kailan Mahuhugasan ang Kasalanan?	Monica Escudero
1989 (38th)	Sharon Cuneta	Babangon Ako't Dudurugin Kita	Salve
1989 (38th)	Snooky Serna	Abot Hanggang Sukdulan	Agnes
1989 (38th)	Susan Roces	Ang Lahat ng Ito Pati Na ang Langit	Rose

=== 1990s ===
Year	Actress	Film	Role
1990 (39th)
1990 (39th)	Nora Aunor‡	Andrea, Paano Ba ang Maging Isang Ina?	Andrea
1990 (39th)	Dina Bonnevie	Gumapang Ka sa Lusak	Rachel Suarez
1990 (39th)	Princess Punzalan	Kung Tapos Na ang Kailanman	
1990 (39th)	Sharon Cuneta	Biktima	Atty. Beca Dizon
1990 (39th)	Vivian Velez	Kasalanan Bang Sambahin Ka?	Catherine Posadas
1991 (40th)
1991 (40th)	Dawn Zulueta‡	Hihintayin Kita sa Langit	Carmina
1991 (40th)	Dina Bonnevie	Sa Kabila ng Lahat	Maria Robles
1991 (40th)	Lorna Tolentino	Kislap sa Dilim	Ciena
1991 (40th)	Maricel Soriano	Dinampot Ka Lang sa Putik	Malou
1991 (40th)	Sharon Cuneta	Una Kang Naging Akin	Diosa Mallari
1992 (41st)
1992 (41st)	Lorna Tolentino‡	Narito ang Puso Ko	
1992 (41st)	Dawn Zulueta	Iisa Pa Lamang	Clara
1992 (41st)	Maricel Laxa	Ikaw ang Lahat sa Akin	Anna
1992 (41st)	Maricel Soriano	Ikaw Pa Lang ang Minahal	Adela
1992 (41st)	Sharon Cuneta	Tayong Dalawa	Carol
1993 (42nd)
1993 (42nd)	Dawn Zulueta‡	Kung Mawawala Ka Pa	Marissa
1993 (42nd)	Dina Bonnevie	Kapag Iginuhit ang Hatol ng Puso	Vina
1993 (42nd)	Lorna Tolentino	Gaano Kita Kamahal	
1993 (42nd)	Sharon Cuneta	Ikaw	Anna
1993 (42nd)	Sheryl Cruz	Ms. Dolora X	
1994 (43rd)
1994 (43rd)	Snooky Serna‡	Koronang Itim	Adana De Guia
1994 (43rd)	Aiko Melendez	Maalaala Mo Kaya: The Movie	Ana
1994 (43rd)	Dawn Zulueta	The Cecilia Masagca Story: Antipolo Massacre (Jesus Save Us!)	Cecilia Masagca
1994 (43rd)	Maricel Soriano	Separada	Melissa
1994 (43rd)	Sheryl Cruz	Paano Na? Sa Mundo Ni Janet	Janet
1995 (44th)
1995 (44th)	Maricel Soriano‡	Dahas	Luisa
1995 (44th)	Chin Chin Gutierrez	Ipaglaban Mo: The Movie	
1995 (44th)	Lea Salonga	Sana Maulit Muli	Agnes
1995 (44th)	Lorna Tolentino	Sa Ngalan ng Pag-ibig	Mae
1995 (44th)	Sharon Cuneta	Minsan Pa: Kahit Konting Pagtingin Part Two	Georgia
1996 (45th)
1996 (45th)	Sharon Cuneta‡	Madrasta	Mariel
1996 (45th)	Chin Chin Gutierrez	Sa Aking mga Kamay	Camille Dela Rosa
1996 (45th)	Jaclyn Jose	Mulanay: Sa Pusod ng Paraiso	
1996 (45th)	Lorna Tolentino	Bayarang Puso	Juliet Sanvictores
1996 (45th)	Maricel Soriano	Ama, Ina, Anak	Marilen Alvarez
1997 (46th)
1997 (46th)	Maricel Soriano‡	Nasaan ang Puso	Joy
1997 (46th)	Lorna Tolentino	Hanggang Kailan Kita Mamahalin	Lisa Reyes
1997 (46th)	Susan Roces	Isinakdal Ko ang Aking Ina	Esperanza
1997 (46th)	Vina Morales	The Sarah Balabagan Story	Sarah Balabagan
1997 (46th)	Zsa Zsa Padilla	Batang PX	Tessie
1998 (47th)
1998 (47th)	Nida Blanca‡	Sana Pag-ibig Na	Linda Perez
1998 (47th)	Elizabeth Oropesa	Sa Pusod ng Dagat	Rosa
1998 (47th)	Gloria Diaz	Miguel/Michelle	Tinang
1998 (47th)	Judy Ann Santos	Kay Tagal Kang Hinintay	Ana
1998 (47th)	Rosanna Roces	Ang Lalaki sa Buhay ni Selya	Selya
1999 (48th)
1999 (48th)	Elizabeth Oropesa ‡	Bulaklak ng Maynila	Azun
1999 (48th)	Ana Capri	Fetch a Pail of Water	Gina
1999 (48th)	Lorna Tolentino	Luksong Tinik	Beth Pineda
1999 (48th)	Maricel Soriano	Soltera	Sandra Valdez
1999 (48th)	Pops Fernandez	Linlang	Myra

=== 2000s ===
Year	Actress	Film	Role
2000 (49th)
2000 (49th)	Gloria Romero ‡	Tanging Yaman	Loleng
2000 (49th)	Lorna Tolentino	Yakapin Mo Ang Umaga	Ria
2000 (49th)	Maricel Soriano	Abandonada	Gemma
2000 (49th)	Pops Fernandez	Gusto Ko Nang Lumigaya	Christine
2000 (49th)	Zsa Zsa Padilla	Ika-13 Kapitulo	Sarah
2001 (50th)
2001 (50th)	Lorna Tolentino ‡	Abakada...Ina	Estela
2001 (50th)	Amy Austria	Bagong Buwan	Fatima
2001 (50th)	Assunta de Rossi	Hubog	Vanessa
2001 (50th)	Dina Bonnevie	Tatarin	Doña Lupe
2001 (50th)	Mylene Dizon	In the Bosom of the Enemy	Pilar
2002 (51st)
2002 (51st)	Aleck Bovick ‡	Tampisaw	Marites
2002 (51st)	Alessandra de Rossi	Mga Munting Tinig	
2002 (51st)	Ara Mina	Mano Po	Richelle Go
2002 (51st)	Claudine Barretto	Kailangan Kita	Elena "Lena" Duran
2002 (51st)	Sharon Cuneta	Magkapatid	Dra. Cita Reyes
2003 (52nd)
2003 (52nd)	Ara Mina ‡	Ang Huling Birhen sa Lupa	Lorena
2003 (52nd)	Ai-Ai delas Alas	Ang Tanging Ina	Ina Montecillo
2003 (52nd)	Lorna Tolentino	Magnifico	Edna
2003 (52nd)	Maricel Soriano	Filipinas	Yolanda Filipinas
2003 (52nd)	Sharon Cuneta	Crying Ladies	Stella Mate
2004 (53rd)
2004 (53rd)	Claudine Barretto ‡	Milan	Jenny
2004 (53rd)	Angelica Panganiban	Santa Santita	Malen
2004 (53rd)	Judy Ann Santos	Sabel	Sabel
2004 (53rd)	Kris Aquino	Feng Shui	Joy Ramirez
2004 (53rd)	Kristine Hermosa	All My Life	Louie
2005 (54th)
2005 (54th)	Claudine Barretto ‡	Nasaan Ka Man	Pilar
2005 (54th)	Irma Adlawan	Mga Pusang Gala	Marta
2005 (54th)	Rica Peralejo	Kutob	Erica
2005 (54th)	Rufa Mae Quinto	Mano Po 4: Ako Legal Wife	Gloria
2005 (54th)	Zsa Zsa Padilla	Mano Po 4: Ako Legal Wife	Chona Chiong
2006 (55th)
2006 (55th)	Judy Ann Santos ‡	Kasal, Kasali, Kasalo	Angelita/Angie
2006 (55th)	Cherry Pie Picache	Kaleldo	Jesusa/Jess
2006 (55th)	Claudine Barretto	Sukob	Diana
2006 (55th)	Gina Pareño	Kubrador	Amelita/Amy
2006 (55th)	Maricel Soriano	Inang Yaya	Norma
2007 (56th)
2007 (56th)	Lorna Tolentino ‡	Katas ng Saudi	Marcy
2007 (56th)	Bea Alonzo	One More Chance	Basha
2007 (56th)	Judy Ann Santos	Sakal, Sakali, Saklolo	Angelita/Angie
2007 (56th)	Maricel Soriano	A Love Story	Joanna Villanueva
2007 (56th)	Regine Velasquez	Paano Kita Iibigin	Martee
2008 (57th)
2008 (57th)	Heart Evangelista ‡	Ay Ayeng	Ayeng
2008 (57th)	Anne Curtis	Baler	Feliza Reyes
2008 (57th)	Dawn Zulueta	Magkaibigan	Tere
2008 (57th)	Judy Ann Santos	Ploning	Ploning
2008 (57th)	Melissa Mendez	Kalakal	Pina
2008 (57th)	Sharon Cuneta	Caregiver	Sarah Gonzales
2009 (58th)
2009 (58th)	Lovi Poe ‡	Sagrada Familia	Kath Asero
2009 (58th)	Angelica Panganiban	I Love You, Goodbye	Lizette Jimenez
2009 (58th)	Eugene Domingo	Kimmy Dora	Kimmy Go Dong Hae / Dora Go Dong Hae
2009 (58th)	Iza Calzado	Dukot	Maricel Salvacruz
2009 (58th)	Janice de Belen	Last Viewing	Laura
2009 (58th)	Sarah Geronimo	You Changed My Life	Adelaida "Laida" Magtalas
2009 (58th)	Sharon Cuneta	Mano Po 6: A Mother's Love	Melinda Tan Uy

=== 2010s ===
Year	Actress	Film	Role
2010 (59th)
2010 (59th)	Ai-Ai delas Alas ‡	Ang Tanging Ina Mo (Last na 'To!)	Ina Montecillo
2010 (59th)	Bea Alonzo	Miss You like Crazy	Mia Samonte
2010 (59th)	Dawn Zulueta	Sigwa	Dolly
2010 (59th)	Jennylyn Mercado	Rosario	Rosario
2010 (59th)	Lorna Tolentino	Sa 'yo Lamang	Amanda Alvero
2011 (60th)
2011 (60th)	Anne Curtis ‡	No Other Woman	Kara Zalderiaga
2011 (60th)	Angel Locsin	In the Name of Love	Mercedes "Cedes" Fernandez
2011 (60th)	Carla Abellana	Manila Kingpin: The Asiong Salonga Story	Fidela Salonga
2011 (60th)	Cristine Reyes	No Other Woman	Charmaine "Cha" Escaler
2011 (60th)	Kris Aquino	Segunda Mano	Mabel
2011 (60th)	Marian Rivera	Ang Panday 2	Arlana
2011 (60th)	Pokwang	A Mother's Story	Remedios "Medy" Santos
2011 (60th)	Rhian Ramos	The Road	Lara
2012 (61st)
2012 (61st)	Angel Locsin ‡	One More Try	Grace
2012 (61st)	Andi Eigenmann	A Secret Affair	Samantha "Sam" Montinola
2012 (61st)	Angelica Panganiban	One More Try	Jacqueline Mendoza
2012 (61st)	Anne Curtis	A Secret Affair	Rafaela "Rafi" Delgado
2012 (61st)	Bea Alonzo	The Mistress	Rosario "Saree" Alfonso
2012 (61st)	Cristine Reyes	El Presidente	Hilaria Aguinaldo
2012 (61st)	Jodi Sta. Maria	Migrante	Frida Mallari
2012 (61st)	Judy Ann Santos	Si Agimat, si Enteng Kabisote at si Ako	Angelina Kalinisan Orteza
2013 (62nd)
2013 (62nd)	KC Concepcion ‡	Boy Golden: Shoot to Kill, the Arturo Porcuna Story	Marla "Marla Dy" De Guzman
2013 (62nd)	Angel Locsin	Four Sisters and A Wedding	Alexandra Camille "Alex" Salazar
2013 (62nd)	Bea Alonzo	Four Sisters and A Wedding	Roberta Olivia "Bobbie" Salazar
2013 (62nd)	Julia Montes	A Moment in Time	Jillian Linden
2013 (62nd)	Kathryn Bernardo	Pagpag: Siyam na Buhay	Leni
2013 (62nd)	Kim Chiu	Bakit Hindi Ka Crush ng Crush Mo?	Sandy Veloso
2013 (62nd)	Lorna Tolentino	Burgos	Editha Burgos
2013 (62nd)	Marian Rivera	Kung Fu Divas	Samantha / Mena
2013 (62nd)	Sarah Geronimo	It Takes a Man and a Woman	Adelaida "Laida" Magtalas
2013 (62nd)	Toni Gonzaga	Four Sisters and A Wedding	Theodora Grace "Teddie" Salazar
2014 (63rd)
2014 (63rd)	Toni Gonzaga ‡	Starting Over Again	Ginny Gonzales
2014 (63rd)	Aiko Melendez	Asintado	Julia
2014 (63rd)	Gladys Reyes	Magkakabaung	Mabel
2014 (63rd)	Gretchen Barretto	The Trial	Amanda Bien
2014 (63rd)	Jean Garcia	Kamkam	Salud
2014 (63rd)	Jennylyn Mercado	English Only, Please	Tere Madlansacay
2014 (63rd)	Kathryn Bernardo	She's Dating the Gangster	Athena Dizon / Kelay Dizon
2014 (63rd)	Kris Aquino	Feng Shui 2	Joy Ramirez
2014 (63rd)	Sam Pinto	Muslim Magnum .357	Ameerah Naureen
2014 (63rd)	Vina Morales	Bonifacio: Ang Unang Pangulo	Gregoria de Jesus
2015 (64th)
2015 (64th)	Andi Eigenmann ‡	Angela Markado	Angela Markado
2015 (64th)	Andi Eigenmann	Tragic Theater	Annie
2015 (64th)	Bea Alonzo	The Love Affair	Atty. Adrianne "Adie" Valiente
2015 (64th)	Bea Alonzo	A Second Chance	Arch. Basha Belinda Eugenio-Gonzales
2015 (64th)	Bela Padilla	Felix Manalo	Honorata "Ata" de Guzmán-Manalo
2015 (64th)	Dawn Zulueta	The Love Affair	Patricia "Trisha" Ramos
2015 (64th)	Kathryn Bernardo	Crazy Beautiful You	Jacqueline "Jackie" Serrano
2015 (64th)	Nadine Lustre	Para sa Hopeless Romantic	Rebecca "Becca" Del Mundo
2015 (64th)	Rhian Ramos	Silong	Valerie
2015 (64th)	Toni Gonzaga	You're My Boss	Georgina Lorenzana
2016 (65th)
2016 (65th)	Angelica Panganiban ‡	The Unmarried Wife	Anne Victorio
2016 (65th)	Angel Locsin	Everything About Her	Jaica Domingo
2016 (65th)	Janice de Belen	Ringgo: The Dog Shooter	
2016 (65th)	Kathryn Bernardo	Barcelona: A Love Untold	Mia Angela Dela Torre / Celine Antipala
2017 (66th)
2017 (66th)	Agot Isidro ‡	Changing Partners	Alex
2017 (66th)	Angeli Bayani	Bagahe	
2017 (66th)	Dexter Doria	Paki	
2017 (66th)	Gloria Diaz	Si Apple at si Chedeng	Chedeng
2017 (66th)	Iza Calzado	Bliss	Jane Ciego
2017 (66th)	Joanna Ampil	Ang Larawan	Candida Marasigan
2017 (66th)	Julia Barretto	Love You to the Stars and Back	Mika
2017 (66th)	Maja Salvador	I'm Drunk, I Love You	Caridad Sonia “Carson” Herrera
2017 (66th)	Max Eigenmann	Kulay Lila ang Gabi na Binudburan pa ng mga Bituin	Chai
2017 (66th)	Nathalie Hart	Historiographika Errata	Librada
2018 (67th)
2018 (67th)	Nadine Lustre ‡	Never Not Love You	Joanne Candelaria
2018 (67th)	Angelica Panganiban	Exes Baggage	Pia
2018 (67th)	Anne Curtis	Sid & Aya: Not a Love Story	Aya
2018 (67th)	Gabby Padilla	Billie & Emma	Emma
2018 (67th)	Glaiza de Castro	Liway	Liway
2018 (67th)	Iyah Mina	Mamu; And a Mother too	Mamerto Gondina
2018 (67th)	Judy Ann Santos	Ang Dalawang Mrs. Reyes	Lianne Reyes
2018 (67th)	Perla Bautista	Kung Paano Hinihintay ang Dapithapon	Teresa
2018 (67th)	Pokwang	Oda sa Wala	Sonya
2018 (67th)	Sarah Geronimo	Miss Granny	Audrey de Leon
2019 (68th)
2019 (68th)	Janine Gutierrez ‡	Babae at Baril	Babae
2019 (68th)	Angela Cortez	Jino to Marie	Marie
2019 (68th)	Bela Padilla	Mañanita	Edilberta
2019 (68th)	Jean Garcia	Watch Me Kill	Luciana
2019 (68th)	Kathryn Bernardo	Hello, Love, Goodbye	Joy Fabregas
2019 (68th)	Nadine Lustre	Ulan	Maya Landicho

=== 2020s ===
Year	Actress	Film	Role
2020 (69th)
2020 (69th)	Alessandra de Rossi ‡	Watch List	Maria
2020 (69th)	Bela Padilla	On Vodka, Beers, and Regrets	Jane
2020 (69th)	Charlie Dizon	Fan Girl	Jane
2020 (69th)	Cristine Reyes	UnTrue	Mara Villanueva
2020 (69th)	Iza Calzado	Tagpuan	Agnes
2020 (69th)	Lovi Poe	Latay	
2021 (70th)
2021 (70th)	Charo Santos-Concio ‡	Kun Maupay Man it Panahon	Norma
2021 (70th)	Janine Gutierrez	Dito at Doon	Len
2021 (70th)	Maja Salvador	Arisaka	Mariano
2021 (70th)	Nicole Laurel	Katips	Lara
2021 (70th)	Rita Daniela	Huling Ulan sa Tag-Araw	Luisa
2021 (70th)	Sharon Cuneta	Revirginized	Carmela
2022 (71st)
2022 (71st)	Nadine Lustre ‡	Greed	Kichi
2022 (71st)	Heaven Peralejo	Nanahimik ang Gabi	Me-Ann
2022 (71st)	Janine Gutierrez	Ngayon Kaya	AM / Amihan Fernandez
2022 (71st)	Liza Lorena	Family Matters	Eleonor Florencio
2022 (71st)	Sheila Francisco	Leonor Will Never Die	Leonor
2023 (72nd)
2023 (72nd)	Kathryn Bernardo ‡	A Very Good Girl	Philomena Angeles
2023 (72nd)	Charlie Dizon	Third World Romance	Britney
2023 (72nd)	Eugene Domingo	Becky and Badette	Becky
2023 (72nd)	Marian Rivera	Rewind	Mary Nuñez
2023 (72nd)	Maricel Soriano	In His Mother's Eyes	Lucy
2023 (72nd)	Sharon Cuneta	Family of Two	Maricar
2024 (73rd)
2024 (73rd)	Marian Rivera ‡	Balota	Emmy
2024 (73rd)	Ara Mina	Mamay	Hadja Alianur Mamay
2024 (73rd)	Judy Ann Santos	Espantaho	Monet
2024 (73rd)	Julia Montes	Topakk	Weng Diwata
2024 (73rd)	Kathryn Bernardo	Hello, Love, Again	Joy Marie Fabregas-del Rosario
2024 (73rd)	Rebecca Chuaunsu	Her Locket	Jewel Ouyang

== Multiple wins and nominations ==
The following individuals won two or more FAMAS Awards for Best Actress:

Wins	Actor	Nominations	First Win	Latest Win
5	Charito Solis	14	Kundiman ng Lahi (1959)	Don't Cry for Me, Papa! (1983)
5	Nora Aunor	17	Tatlong Taong Walang Diyos (1976)	Andrea, Paano Ba ang Maging Isang Ina? (1990)
5	Vilma Santos	13	Dama de Noche (1972)	Ibulong Mo sa Diyos (1988)
3	Lorna Tolentino	16	Narito ang Puso Ko (1992)	Katas ng Saudi (2007)
2	Claudine Barretto	4	Milan (2004)	Nasaan Ka Man (2005)
2	Dawn Zulueta	7	Hihintayin Kita sa Langit (1991)	Kung Mawawala Ka Pa (1993)
2	Elizabeth Oropesa	4	Lumapit, Lumayo ang Umaga (1975)	Bulaklak ng Maynila (1999)
2	Gloria Romero	5	Dalagang Ilocana (1954)	Tanging Yaman (2000)
2	Gloria Sevilla	6	Badlis sa Kinabuhi (1969)	Gimingaw Ako (1973)
2	Lolita Rodriguez	16	Gilda (1956)	Tinimbang Ka Ngunit Kulang (1974)
2	Maricel Soriano	16	Dahas (1995)	Nasaan ang Puso (1997)
2	Marlene Dauden	6	Sa Bawat Pintig ng Puso (1964)	Kapag Puso'y Sinugatan (1967)
2	Nadine Lustre	4	Never Not Love You (2018)	Greed (2022)
2	Rita Gomez	8	Talipandas (1958)	Bakit Ako Pa (1970)
2	Sharon Cuneta	16	Dapat Ka Bang Mahalin? (1984)	Madrasta (1996)
2	Susan Roces	13	Maligno (1977)	Gumising Ka Maruja (1978)

The following individuals received four or more Best Actress nominations:

Nominations	Actor	First Nomination	Latest Nomination
17	Nora Aunor	A Gift of Love (1972)	Andrea, Paano Ba ang Maging Isang Ina? (1990)
16	Lolita Rodriguez	Jack and Jill (1954)	Tinimbang Ka Ngunit Kulang (1974)
16	Lorna Tolentino	Maging Akin Ka Lamang (1987)	Burgos (2013)
16	Maricel Soriano	Kaya Kong Abutin ang Langit (1984)	In His Mother's Eyes (2023)
16	Sharon Cuneta	Dapat Ka Bang Mahalin? (1984)	Family of Two (2023)
14	Charito Solis	Ulilang Birhen (1956)	Don't Cry for Me, Papa! (1983)
13	Susan Roces	Ana-Roberta (1965)	Isinakdal Ko ang Aking Ina (1997)
13	Vilma Santos	Dama de Noche (1972)	Ibulong Mo sa Diyos (1988)
9	Amalia Fuentes	Kulay Dugo ang Gabi (1964)	Isang Gabi... Tatlong Babae (1974)
8	Judy Ann Santos	Kay Tagal Kang Hinintay (1998)	Espantaho (2024)
8	Rita Gomez	Via Dolorosa (1956)	Pagdating sa Dulo (1971)
7	Boots Anson-Roa	Siete Dolores (1968)	Saan Ka Pupunta, Miss Lutgarda Nicolas? (1975)
7	Dawn Zulueta	Hihintayin Kita sa Langit (1991)	The Love Affair (2015)
7	Dina Bonnevie	Magdusa Ka (1986)	Tatarin (2001)
7	Kathryn Bernardo	Pagpag: Siyam na Buhay (2013)	Hello, Love, Again (2024)
6	Bea Alonzo	One More Chance (2007)	A Second Chance (2015) The Love Affair (2015)
6	Gloria Sevilla	May Bakas ang Lumipas (1954)	Gimingaw Ako (1973)
6	Marlene Dauden	Gumuhong Bantayog (1960)	Babae... Ikaw ang Dahilan (1972)
6	Nida Blanca	Batanguena (1953)	Sana Pag-ibig Na (1998)
5	Angelica Panganiban	Santa Santita (2004)	Exes Baggage (2018)
5	Gloria Romero	Dalagang Ilocana (1954)	Tanging Yaman (2000)
5	Perla Bautista	Markang Rehas (1962)	Kung Paano Hinihintay ang Dapithapon (2018)
5	Vivian Velez	Ang Babaeng Hinugot sa Aking Tadyang (1981)	Kasalanan Bang Sambahin Ka? (1990)
4	Angel Locsin	In the Name of Love (2011)	Everything About Her (2016)
4	Anne Curtis	Baler (2008)	Sid & Aya: Not a Love Story (2018)
4	Claudine Barretto	Kailangan Kita (2002)	Sukob (2006)
4	Elizabeth Oropesa	Lumapit, Lumayo ang Umaga (1975)	Bulaklak ng Maynila (1999)
4	Marian Rivera	Ang Panday 2 (2011)	Balota (2024)
4	Nadine Lustre	Para sa Hopeless Romantic (2015)	Greed (2022)
4	Paraluman	Sino ang Maysala? (1957)	Isinulat sa Dugo (1965)

== Trivia ==
Superlative	Best Actress	
Actress with most consecutive nominations	Nora Aunor	15
Oldest winner	Gloria Romero	67
Oldest nominee	Liza Lorena	73
Youngest winner	Vilma Santos; Sharon Cuneta	19
Youngest Best Actress Hall of Fame recipient	Vilma Santos	36
