= List of Philippine films of 2015 =

This is an incomplete list of Filipino full-length films, both mainstream and independently produced, released in theaters and cinemas in 2015.

== Top grossing films ==
The films released in 2015 by domestic gross are as follows:

- – a Metro Manila Film Festival entry film

Rank	Title	Distributor	Box office
1	Beauty and the Bestie	Star Cinema	₱ 529,000,000 (est.)
2	A Second Chance	Star Cinema	₱ 480,000,000^{1} (est.)
3	My Bebe Love: #KiligPaMore	OctoArts Films	₱ 385,000,000 (est.)
4	Crazy Beautiful You	Star Cinema	₱ 320,000,000^{2} (est.)
5	The Love Affair	Star Cinema	₱ 300,000,000^{3} (est.)
6	Heneral Luna	Artikulo Uno	₱ 256,000,000 (est.)
7	Felix Manalo	Viva Films	₱ 226,469,094
8	You're My Boss	Star Cinema	₱ 210,000,000 (est.)
9	The Breakup Playlist	Star Cinema	₱ 148,219,020
10	That Thing Called Tadhana	Star Cinema	₱ 134,000,000 (est.)

1. A Second Chance earned an estimated total of ₱ 556,000,000 which includes international gross.
2. Crazy Beautiful You earned an estimated total of ₱ 420,000,000 which includes international gross.
3. The Love Affair earned an estimated total of ₱ 320,000,000 which includes international gross.

== Films ==
=== January–March ===
Color key

- – a Sinag Maynila Film Festival entry film

Opening	Title	Production outfit	Cast and crew	Genre	Source
January 8	Tragic Theater	Viva Films	Tikoy Aguiluz (director), Andi Eigenmann, John Estrada, Christopher de Leon	Horror	
January 14	Edsa Woolworth *(2015 commercial release)	TFC, Star Cinema	John D-Lazatin (director); Pokwang, Lee O' Brien, Stephen Spohn, Lee Robin Salazar	OFW, romance	
January 21	#EwanKoSau Saranghaeyo	Bagong Bayan Artist Collective, Bonfire Productions	Roman Perez, Jr. (director); Barbie Forteza, Francis Magundayao, Elisse Joson, Jon Lucas, Isabelle Mauricio	Romance, teen	
January 28	Halik sa Hangin	Star Cinema	Manny Palo (director); Gerald Anderson, JC de Vera, Julia Montes	Horror, romance	
February 4	That Thing Called Tadhana *(2015 commercial release)	Cinema One Originals, Star Cinema	Antoinette Jadaone (director); Angelica Panganiban, JM de Guzman	Romantic comedy	
February 11	Liwanag sa Dilim	APT Entertainment	Richard Somes (director); Jake Vargas, Bea Binene, Sarah Lahbati, Rico Blanco	Action, adventure	
February 25	Bahay Ampunan	MSV Entertainment Productions	Neal Tan (director); Jake Vargas, Renz Michael, Martin Venegas, Elaver Pacatang	Horror	
February 25	Crazy Beautiful You	Star Cinema	Mae Cruz-Alviar (director); Kathryn Bernardo, Daniel Padilla	Drama, romantic comedy	
March 4	RedBook	Rodriguez Film Production	Rudy Diaz Saron (director); Ynna Asistio, Vangie Labalan, Jan Manual, Jex Villaruel, Krystel Garcia	Horror	
March 18	Balut Country	Solar Entertainment, Brillante Mendoza	Paul Sta. Ana (director); Rocco Nacino, Ronnie Quizon, Nanette Inventor, Angela Cortez	Business	
March 18	Bambanti	Solar Entertainment, Brillante Mendoza	Zig Dulay (director); Alessandra de Rossi, Micko Laurente, Julio Diaz	Drama	
March 18	Imbisibol	Solar Entertainment, Brillante Mendoza	Lawrence Fajardo (director); Allen Dizon, JM de Guzman, Bernardo Bernardo, Ces Quesada	Biopic, OFW	
March 18	Ninja Party	Solar Entertainment, Brillante Mendoza	Jim Libiran (director); Annicka Dolonius, Julz Savard, Bea Galvez, Elora Espano, Odette Khan	LGBT, teen	
March 18	Swap	Solar Entertainment, Brillante Mendoza	Remton Zuasola (director); Dionne Monsanto, Matt Daclan, Mon Confiado	Crime	

=== April–June ===
Color key

- – a World Premieres Film Festival entry film

Opening	Title	Production outfit	Cast and crew	Genre	Source
April 4	You're My Boss	Star Cinema	Antoinette Jadaone (director); Toni Gonzaga, Coco Martin	Romantic comedy	
April 15	Kid Kulafu	Ten17P, Star Cinema	Paul Soriano (director); Buboy Villar, Cesar Montano, Alessandra de Rossi	Biopic, sports	
April 29	Your Place or Mine?	Viva Films	Joel Lamangan (director); Andi Eigenmann, Bret Jackson, Andre Paras	Drama, romantic comedy	
May 6	Alimuom ng Kahapon	Mountain Trail Films, EDGE Manila Creatives Corporation	Rosswil Hilario (director); DM Sevilla, Angelo Ilagan, Sebastian Castro, Manuel Chua	Drama, romance	
May 13	Para sa Hopeless Romantic	Viva Films, Star Cinema	Andoy Ranay (director); James Reid, Nadine Lustre, Iñigo Pascual, Julia Barretto	Drama, romantic comedy	
May 20	Binhi: The Seed	Haunted Tower Pictures, Viva Films	Pedring Lopez (director); Mercedes Cabral, Joem Bascon	Horror	
May 27	You're Still the One	Star Cinema, Regal Entertainment	Chris Martinez (director); Maja Salvador, Dennis Trillo, Richard Yap	Drama, romance	
June 3	Espesyal Kopol	Bagon's Film Production	Neal Tan (director); K Brosas, Pooh	Comedy	
June 3	Stars Versus Me	Tandem Entertainment	Joven Tan (director); Manolo Pedrosa, Maris Racal	Romantic comedy	
June 17	Just the Way You Are	Star Cinema	Theodore Boborol (director); Enrique Gil, Liza Soberano	Drama, romance, Comedy	
June 24	Waves	Waverly Pictures, Viva Films	Don Gerardo Frasco (director); Baron Geisler, Ilona Struzik	Drama, romance	
June 25	An Kubo sa Kawayanan	Vim Yapan/Alem Chua Productions	Alvin Yapan (director); Mercedes Cabral, RK Bagatsing, Marc Felix	Drama, fantasy	
June 25	Sino Nga Ba si Pangkoy Ong?	Barjonah Productions International	Jonah Lim (director); Kiko Matos, Paulo de Vera, Elston Jimenez	Comedy	
June 26	I Love You. Thank You.	The Grit Project, Noel D. Ferrer Productions	Charliebebs Gohetia (director); Joross Gamboa, Prince Stefan, Ae Pattawan, CJ Reyes	Drama, romance	
June 26	Maskara	Communication Foundation for Asia	Genesis Nolasco (director); Ina Feleo, Ping Medina, Lance Raymundo, Lester Llansang, Boots Anson-Roa	Drama, mystery	
June 26	Piring	HD Productions, BigDreams Production	Carlos Morales (director); Krista Miller, Yussef Estevez, Rocky Salumbides, Bembol Roco, Tessie Tomas	Drama	
June 27	Ang Kwento Nating Dalawa	Dogtown Manila, Monoxide Works, Ramon Bautista Films	Nestor Abrogena (director); Nicco Manalo, Emmanuelle Vera	Drama, romance	
June 27	Filemon Mamon	MegaVision	Will Fredo (director); Jerome Ignacio, Nanette Inventor, Smokey Manaloto	Comedy, musical	
June 27	Of Sinners and Saints	See Thru Pictures	Ruben Maria Soriquez (director); Ruben Maria Soriquez, Raymond Bagatsing, Polo Ravales, Chanel Latorre	Thriller	

=== July–September ===
Opening	Title	Production outfit	Cast and crew	Genre	Source
July 1	The Breakup Playlist	Star Cinema, Viva Films	Dan Villegas (director); Sarah Geronimo, Piolo Pascual	Drama, music, romance	
July 22	Chain Mail	Viva Films	Adolfo Alix, Jr. (director); Meg Imperial, Shy Carlos, AJ Muhlach, Rose Van Ginkel, Caleb Santos, Nadine Lustre	Horror	
August 5	Mandirigma	Starquest Alliance Productions, Blank Pages Productions	Arlyn Dela Cruz (director); Luis Alandy, Pen Medina, Alywn Uytingco, Mon Confiado	Military drama	
August 12	The Love Affair	Star Cinema	Nuel Naval (director); Dawn Zulueta, Richard Gomez, Bea Alonzo	Drama, romance	
August 12	Mula sa Kung Ano ang Noon *(2015 commercial release)	Sine Olivia Pilipinas	Lav Diaz (director); Perry Dizon, Roeder Camañag, Hazel Orencio	Drama	
August 26	Homeless	BG Productions International	Neal Tan (director); Ejay Falcon, Snooky Serna, Martin del Rosario	Drama	
September 2	Ex with Benefits	Star Cinema, Viva Films	Gino M. Santos (director); Derek Ramsay, Coleen Garcia, Meg Imperial	Drama, romance	
September 9	Heneral Luna	Artikulo Uno Productions, Quantum Films	Jerrold Tarog (director); John Arcilla, Mon Confiado, Epi Quizon, Arron Villaflor	Historical, biopic	
September 13	Walang Take Two	INCinema Productions	Carlo Ortega Cuevas (director); John Stevenson Tabangay, Erbil Escano Jr., Edward Rudolph Flores, Joyce Gabion, Wilson Tapalla, Virgilio Reyes, Kim Cordero, Dennis Garcia	Real-life, religious	
September 16	Silong	SQ Film Laboratories, Black Maria Pictures, Star Cinema	Jeffrey Hidalgo, Roy Sevilla Ho (directors); Piolo Pascual, Rhian Ramos	Mystery, romance	
September 16	Taklub	Centerstage Productions	Brillante Mendoza (director); Nora Aunor, Julio Diaz, Lou Veloso, Aaron Rivera	Drama	
September 23	The PBA: A Nation’s Passion	PBA Properties, Caelestis Productions	Adrian Belic (director); Various interview subjects (former and current PBA players, coaches and team owners)	Documentary, sports	
September 23	Resureksyon	Regal Entertainment, Reality Entertainment	Borgy Torre (director); Paulo Avelino, Jasmine Curtis-Smith, Isabelle Daza	Horror	
September 30	Etiquette for Mistresses	Star Cinema	Chito Roño (director); Kris Aquino, Kim Chiu, Claudine Barretto, Iza Calzado, Cheena Crab	Drama, romance	

=== October–December ===
Color key

- – a QCinema International Film Festival entry film
- – a Cinema One Originals Film Festival entry film
- – a MMFF New Wave Category entry film
- – a Metro Manila Film Festival entry film

Opening	Title	Production outfit	Cast and crew	Genre	Source
October 7	Felix Manalo	Viva Films, Iglesia ni Cristo	Joel Lamangan (director); Dennis Trillo, Bela Padilla	Historical, biopic, religious	
October 14	The Prenup	Regal Entertainment	Jun Lana (director); Jennylyn Mercado, Sam Milby	Romantic comedy	
October 22	Apocalypse Child	Arkeo Films	Mario Cornejo (director); Sid Lucero, Gwen Zamora, Ana Abad-Santos	Drama	
October 22	Gayuma	Artikulo Uno Productions	Cesar Hernando (director); Benjamin Alves, Phoebe Walker	Erotic, drama	
October 22	Iisa	Voyage Studios	Chuck Gutierrez (director); Angeli Bayani, Rio Locsin, Jess Mendoza	Drama	
October 22	Kapatiran	EpicMedia, Pōtocol	Pepe Diokno (director); Timothy Mabalot, Abner Delina, Daniel Medrana	Drama	
October 22	Matangtubig	Kerberus Kinorama Klassiks, Tuko Film Productions, Buchi Boy Films	Jet Leyco (director); Amante Pulido, Dan Jarden De Guzman, Shielbert Manuel	Supernatural, suspense	
October 22	Patintero: Ang Alamat ni Meng Patalo	Tuko Film Productions, Buchi Boy Films	Mihk Vergara (director); Nafa Hilario-Cruz, Lenlen Frial, William Buenavente, Claude Mikael Adrales	Comedy, drama	
October 22	Sleepless	The Idea First Company, Indioboy Productions	Prime Cruz (director); Glaiza de Castro, Dominic Roco, TJ Trinidad	Romance	
October 22	Water Lemon	Blue Sky Productions, Tuko Film Productions	Lemuel Lorca (director); Jun-jun Quintana, Tessie Tomas, Meryll Soriano, Alessandra de Rossi, Lou Veloso	Drama	
October 28	Everyday I Love You	Star Cinema	Mae Cruz-Alviar (director); Enrique Gil, Liza Soberano, Gerald Anderson	Drama, romance	
November 4	Flotsam	Banana Pancake Trail Productions	Jay Abello (director); Solenn Heussaff, Rocco Nacino	Romance	
November 4	Old Skool	Till I'm 90 Films	Cia Hermosa-Jorge (director); Tessie Tomas, Angel Aquino, Buboy Villar	Drama	
November 9	Baka Siguro Yata	Creative Programs, Monoxide Works, Punchkick Productions	Joel Ferrer (director); Dino Pastrano, Bangs Garcia, Cherie Gil, Ricky Davao	Romantic comedy	
November 9	Bukod Kang Pinagpala	Southern Lantern Studios	Sheron Dayoc (director); Bing Pimentel, Max Eigenmann, Paolo Paraiso	Horror	
November 9	The Comeback	Quantum Films, Eight Films, Creative Programs	Ivan Andrew Payawal (director); Kaye Abad	Comedy, drama	
November 9	Dahling Nick	Kino Arts, Creative Programs	Sari Dalena (director); Raymond Bagatsing	Docudrama, biopic	
November 9	Dayung Asu	Ikot Productions, SQ Film Laboratories	Bor Ocampo (director); Ricky Davao, Jun-jun Quintana	Action, thriller	
November 9	Hamog	Keep Me Posted, Black Maria Pictures, WildSound, CMB	Ralston Jover (director); Zaijan Jaranilla, Teri Malvar	Drama	
November 9	Manang Biring	Creative Programs, Black Maria Pictures	Carl Joseph Papa (director); Erlinda Villalobos	Comedy, drama	
November 9	Miss Bulalacao	Panumduman Pictures, EpicMedia, Above the Line Productions	Ara Chawdhury (director); Russ Ligtas, Gwen Zamora, Ana Abad-Santos	Comedy	
November 9	Mga Rebeldeng Walang Kaso	Creative Programs	Raymond Red (director); Felix Roco, Epy Quizon, Nicco Manalo, Earl Ignacio, Angela Cortez	Drama	
November 11	Maria Labo	KIB Productions, Star Builders Talent Agency & Film Production, Viva Films	Roi Vinzon (director); Kate Brios, Jestoni Alarcon	Horror	
November 11	No Boyfriend Since Birth	Regal Entertainment	Jose Javier Reyes (director); Carla Abellana, Tom Rodriguez	Romance, drama	
November 18	Wang Fam	Viva Films	Wenn Deramas (director); Pokwang, Andre Paras, Benjie Paras	Comedy, horror	
November 25	A Second Chance	Star Cinema	Cathy Garcia-Molina (director); John Lloyd Cruz & Bea Alonzo	Romance, drama	
November 28	Child Haus	BG Productions International	Louie Ignacio (director); Miggs Cuaderno, Therese Malvar, Vince Magbanua, Felixia Dizon, Erica Yu, Mona Louise Rey	Drama	
November 28	Isang Hakbang	Sonza Entertainment Production	Mike Magat (director); Miguel Antonio, Buboy Villar, Snooky Serna, Ricardo Cepeda	Drama	
December 2	Angela Markado	Oro de Siete Productions, Viva Films	Carlo J. Caparas (director/screenplay); Andi Eigenmann, Paolo Contis, Felix Roco, Polo Ravales, CJ Caparas, Epy Quizon, Bembol Roco, Marita Zobel, Ana Roces	Action thriller	
December 2	One Day, Isang Araw, I Saw Nakakita	Yebahdabadoo Productions	Dinky Doo (director); AJ Ocampo, John Regala, Niño Muhlach, Lara Quigaman, Allen Dizon, Anna Feliciano	Action, comedy, drama	
December 9	Manila's Finest	Prince Armor Productions, Philippine Motion Pictures Directors Association, Viva Films	William Mayo (director); Jose Carreon (screenplay); Jeric Raval, Bangs Garcia, Mark Anthony Fernandez, Danilo "Brownie" Pansalin, Jay Prince Armodoval, Joko Diaz, Leo Martinez, Jao Mapa, Rich Asuncion, Rommel Padilla	Action	
December 17	ARI: My Life with a King	Holy Angel University, Center for Kapampangan Studies	Carlo Enciso Catu (director); Ronwaldo Martin, Francisco Guinto	Drama	
December 17	Mandirigma	Starquest Alliance Productions, Blank Pages Productions	Arlyn Dela Cruz (director); Luis Alandy, Pen Medina, Alywn Uytingco, Mon Confiado	Military drama	
December 17	Tandem	Quantum Films, Tuko Film Productions, Buchi Boy Films	King Palisoc (director); JM de Guzman, Nico Antonio	Drama, thriller	
December 17	Toto	Toto SCM Production, Central Digital Lab	John Paul Su (director); Sid Lucero	Comedy, drama	
December 17	Turo-Turo	Handheld Entertainment Production	Ray An Dulay (director); Albert Silos, AJ Dee	Drama	
December 25	All You Need Is Pag-Ibig	Star Cinema, K Productions	Antoinette Jadaone (director); Kris Aquino, Derek Ramsay, Jodi Sta. Maria, Ian Veneracion, Kim Chiu, Xian Lim, Ronaldo Valdez, Nova Villa, Pokwang, Bimby Aquino-Yap	Romantic comedy	
December 25	Beauty and the Bestie	Star Cinema, Viva Films	Wenn Deramas (director); Vice Ganda, Coco Martin, James Reid, Nadine Lustre	Comedy, action	
December 25	Buy Now, Die Later	Quantum Films, MJM Production, Tuko Film Productions, Buchi Boy Films	Randolph Longjas (director); Vhong Navarro, John Lapus, Alex Gonzaga, TJ Trinidad, Rayver Cruz, Lotlot de Leon, Janine Gutierrez	Horror, thriller	
December 25	Haunted Mansion	Regal Entertainment	Jun Lana (director); Janella Salvador, Marlo Mortel, Jerome Ponce	Horror, thriller	
December 25	Honor Thy Father	Reality Entertainment	Erik Matti (director); John Lloyd Cruz, Meryll Soriano	Action, drama	
December 25	My Bebe Love: #KiligPaMore	OctoArts Films, M-Zet Productions, APT Entertainment, GMA Films, MEDA Productions	Jose Javier Reyes (director); Ai-Ai delas Alas, Vic Sotto, Alden Richards, Maine Mendoza	Romantic comedy	
December 25	Nilalang	Haunted Tower Pictures, WeLovePost, Parallax Studios, Viva Films	Pedring Lopez (director); Cesar Montano, Maria Ozawa	Horror, suspense, thriller	
December 25	#Walang Forever	Quantum Films, MJM Production, Tuko Film Productions, Buchi Boy Films	Dan Villegas (director); Jennylyn Mercado, Jericho Rosales	Romantic comedy	

== Awards ==
=== Local ===
The following first list shows the Best Picture winners at the four major film awards: FAMAS Awards, Gawad Urian Awards, Luna Awards and Star Awards; and at the three major film festivals: Metro Manila Film Festival, Cinemalaya and Cinema One Originals. The second list shows films with the most awards won from the four major film awards and a breakdown of their total number of awards per award ceremony.

Award/festival	Best Picture		Ref.
64th FAMAS Awards	Felix Manalo		
39th Gawad Urian Awards	Taklub		
34th Luna Awards	Heneral Luna		
32nd Star Awards for Movies	Bambanti	Felix Manalo	
26th Young Critics Circle Citations	Da Dog Show		
41st Metro Manila Film Festival	ARI: My Life with a King	#Walang Forever	
11th Cinemalaya Independent Film Festival	None		
11th Cinema One Originals Film Festival	Manang Biring		

Film	Total	FAMAS	Urian	Luna	Star
Heneral Luna	17	0	4	10	3
Felix Manalo	10	5	0	0	5
Bambanti	5	0	0	0	5
Crazy Beautiful You	4	3	0	0	1
Honor Thy Father	4	0	1	0	3
Apocalypse Child	3	0	1	1	1
ARI: My Life with a King	3	1	2	0	0
Silong	3	1	0	0	2

=== International ===
The following list shows Filipino films (released in 2015) which were nominated or won awards at international industry-based awards and FIAPF-accredited competitive film festivals.

Award/festival	Category	Nominee	Result	Ref.
10th Asian Film Awards	Best Actor	John Arcilla, Heneral Luna	Nominated	
10th Asian Film Awards	Best Costume Designer	Carlo Tabije, Heneral Luna	Nominated	
10th Asian Film Awards	Best Production Designer	Benjamin Padero & Carlo Tabije, Heneral Luna	Nominated	
10th Asia Pacific Screen Awards	Best Animated Feature Film	Manang Biring	Nominated	
68th Cannes Film Festival	Prize of the Ecumenical Jury - Special Mention	Taklub (Trap)	Won	
38th Moscow International Film Festival	Silver St. George for Best Actress	Therese Malvar, Hamog (Haze)	Won	
19th Shanghai International Film Festival	Outstanding Artistic Achievement	Ralston Jover, Hamog (Haze)	Won	

== See also ==
- 2015 in the Philippines
