= 2016 FAMAS Awards =

Annual Filipino film awards ceremony

69th FAMAS Awards
- Date: December 4, 2016
- Site: Century Park Hotel

Highlights
- Best Picture: Felix Manalo
- Most awards: Felix Manalo (5)
- Most nominations: Crazy Beautiful You (15) Para sa Hopeless Romantic (15) Silong (15)

The 64th FAMAS Awards were presented December 4, 2016 at the Century Park Hotel in Malate, Manila honoring the outstanding achievements in Filipino films of 2015.

== Winners and nominees ==
Winners are listed first, highlighted in boldface and indicated with a double dagger (‡).

Best Picture	Best Director
**Felix Manalo — Viva Films**‡; The Love Affair — Malou N. Santos for Star Cinema; A Second Chance — Malou N. Santos for Star Cinema; Angela Markado — Oro De Siete Films, Viva Films; Ari: My Life with a King — CMB Studios; Crazy Beautiful You — Malou N Santos for Star Cinema; Para sa Hopeless Romantic — Film Development Council of the Philippines and BG Productions International; Silong — Film Laboratories Inc. and Black Maria Pictures	**Joel Lamangan — Felix Manalo**‡; Andoy Ranay — Para sa Hopeless Romantic; Antoinette Jadaone — You're My Boss; Carlo Encisco Catu — Ari: My Life with a King; Carlo J. Caparas — Angela Markado; Cathy Garcia-Molina — A Second Chance; Mae Czarina Cruz-Alviar — Crazy Beautiful You; Nuel C. Naval — The Love Affair; Roy Sevilla Ho, Jeffrey Hidalgo — Silong; Tikoy Aguiluz — Tragic Theater
Best Actor	Best Actress
**Dennis Trillo — Felix Manalo as Felix Manalo**‡; Coco Martin — You're My Boss as Pong Dalupan; Daniel Padilla — Crazy Beautiful You as Kiko Alcantara; Francisco Guinto — Ari: My Life with a King as Conrado 'Kong Dado' Guinto; James Reid — Para sa Hopeless Romantic as Nikko; John Estrada — Tragic Theater as Fr. Nilo Marcelo; John Lloyd Cruz — A Second Chance as Popoy; Paolo Contis — Angela Markado as Leo; Piolo Pascual — Silong as Dr. Miguel Cascarro; Richard Gomez — The Love Affair as Vince Ramos	**Andi Eigenmann — Angela Markado as Angela Markado**‡; Andi Eigenmann — Tragic Theater as Annie Francisco; Bea Alonzo — The Love Affair as Atty. Adrianne "Adie" Valiente; Bea Alonzo — A Second Chance as Basha-Belinda Eugenio Gonzales; Bela Padilla — Felix Manalo as Honorata "Ata" de Guzmán-Manalo; Dawn Zulueta — The Love Affair as Patricia "Trisha" Ramos; Kathryn Bernardo — Crazy Beautiful You as Jacqueline "Jackie" Serrano; Nadine Lustre — Para sa Hopeless Romantic as Rebecca "Becca" Del Mundo; Rhian Ramos — Silong as Valerie; Toni Gonzaga — You're My Boss as Georgina Lorenzana
Best Supporting Actor	Best Supporting Actress
**Gabby Concepcion — Crazy Beautiful You as Mayor Ito Alcantara**‡; Christopher de Leon — Tragic Theater as Miguel Sanchez Agcaoli; Epy Quizon — Angela Markado as Troy; Freddie Webb — You're My Boss as Sir Albert; Guji Lorenzana — Silong as Gilbert; Iñigo Pascual — Para sa Hopeless Romantic as Ryan Sebastian; Ketchup Eusebio — Heneral Luna as Pedro Janolino; Ronwaldo Martin — Ari: My Life with a King as Jaypee	**Lorna Tolentino — Crazy Beautiful You as Dra. Leah Serrano**‡; Angel Jacob — Silong as Caroline; Bea Saw — A Second Chance as Angeline "Anj" Tan; Cecile Yumul — Ari: My Life with a King as Miding; Julia Barretto — Para sa Hopeless Romantic as Maria Kristina Lapuz; Roxanne Barcelo — Tragic Theater as Arlene de Lara; Ysabelle Peach — Angela Markado as Sabel Digna
Best Child Performer	Best Screenplay
**JM Ibañez — Crazy Beautiful You as Tintoy**‡; Carl Acosta — Felix Manalo as young Felix Manalo; Sam Shoaf — Silong as Miguel	**Bienvenido Santiago — Felix Manalo'‡**; Antoinette Jadaone and Yoshke Dimen — You're My Boss; Carlo J. Caparas — Tragic Theater; Carmi G. Raymundo, Vanessa R. Valdez and Cathy Garcia-Molina — A Second Chance; G.M. Coronel — Tragic Theater; Maan Dimaculangan, John Christian Nicolas, Bianca B. Bernardino and Carmi Raymundo — Crazy Beautiful You; Mel Mendoza-Del Rosario and Mary Rose Colindres — Para sa Hopeless Romantic; Robby Tantingco — Ari: My Life with a King; Roy Sevilla Ho — Silong; Vanessa R. Valdez — The Love Affair
Best Cinematography	Best Production Design
**Rain Yamson — Silong**‡; Anne Monzon — The Love Affair; Boy Yniquez — Tragic Theater; Carlo Mendoza — Ari: My Life with a King; Dan Villegas and Moises Lee — Crazy Beautiful You; Erwin Cruz — Angela Markado; Herman Claravall — You're My Boss; Noel Teehankee — A Second Chance; Pao Orendain — Para sa Hopeless Romantic; Rody Lacap — Felix Manalo	**Shari Marie Montiague — You're My Boss**‡; Efren Vibar — The Love Affair; Gerry Borreros — A Second Chance; Gwyn Guanzon and Riza Romero — Para sa Hopeless Romantic; Joel Bilbao, Edgar Martin Littaua and Daniel Red — Felix Manalo; Joy Abadeza — Angela Markado; Roland Rebunecia — Silong; Roma Regala and Richard Somes — Tragic Theater; Winston Acuyong — Crazy Beautiful You
Best Editing	Best Story
**Carlo Francisco Manatad — Para sa Hopeless Romantic'‡**; Bebs Gohetia — Angela Markado; Beng Bandong — The Love Affair; Carlo Francisco Manatad — Ari: My Life with a King; John Anthony L. Wong — Felix Manalo; Marya Ignacio — A Second Chance; Marya Ignacio — Crazy Beautiful You; Marya Ignacio — You're My Boss; Rolando Eucasion and Mirana Medina-Bhunjun — Tragic Theater; Sarah Roxas — Silong	**Robby Tantingco — Ari: My Life with a King'‡**; Antoinette Jadaone and Yoshke Dimen — You're My Boss; Bienvenido Santiago — Felix Manalo; Carlo J. Caparas — Angela Markado; Carmi G. Raymundo, Vanessa R. Valdez and Cathy Garcia-Molina — A Second Chance; G.M. Coronel — Tragic Theater; Marcelo Santos III — Para sa Hopeless Romantic; Rory B. Quintos — Crazy Beautiful You; Roy Sevilla Ho — Silong; Vanessa R. Valdez — The Love Affair
Best Sound	Best Musical Score
**Addiss Tabong — You're My Boss'‡**; Albert Michael Idioma — Felix Manalo; Albert Michael Idioma — Tragic Theater; Arnel M. Labayo — Crazy Beautiful You; Aurel Claro Bilbao — A Second Chance; Aurel Claro Bilbao — The Love Affair; Gilbert Obispo — Ari: My Life With A King; Jess Carlos — Silong; Junel Valencia — Angela Markado; Lamberto Casas Jr. — Para sa Hopeless Romantic	**Cesar Francis Concio — The Love Affair**‡; Cesar Francis Concio — A Second Chance; Emerson Texon — Angela Markado; Emerson Texon — You're My Boss; Emerson Texon — Tragic Theater; Jake Abello — Ari: My Life With A King; Jesse Lucas — Crazy Beautiful You; Myke Solomon — Para sa Hopeless Romantic; Teresa Barrozo — Silong; Von de Guzman — Felix Manalo
Best Theme Song	Best Visual Effects
**"Ang Sugo ng Diyos sa mga Huling Araw" from Felix Manalo — Music by Sonic State Audio; Lyrics by Abra** ‡; "I'll Never Go" from A Second Chance — music and lyrics by Nexxus; "Your Love" from The Love Affair — music and lyrics by Alamid; "Baby I Need Your Loving" from You're My Boss — music and lyrics by Four Tops; "Ikaw" from Para sa Hopeless Romantic — music and lyrics by Yeng Constantino; "Nothing's Gonna Stop Us Now" from Crazy Beautiful You — music and lyrics by Albert Hammond and Diane Warren; "With Whom" from Silong — music and lyrics by Kitchie Nadal	**Angela Markado — Vincent Ilagan and Mike Velasquez**‡; Felix Manalo — Adrian Arcega; A Second Chance — Aileen Girlie Mercado; Para sa Hopeless Romantic — OJ Desuasido; Tragic Theater — Dodge Ledesma

=== Special awards ===
FAMAS Lifetime Achievement Award

- Gloria Sevilla

Presidential Award

- Vilma Santos

German Moreno Youth Achievement Award

- Jak Roberto
- Sanya Lopez
- Gabbi Garcia

Fernando Poe Jr. Memorial Award

- Robin Padilla

Art M. Padua Memorial Award

- Danny Dolor

Dr. Jose Perez Memorial Award

- Jojo Gabinete

Recognition Award for Outstanding Performance

- Arnold Reyes

2016 Advocacy Film

- EDSA

Father of Visual Poetry

- Doc Penpen B. Takipsilim

Special Citation

- Persida Acosta (for championing the cause of eliminating violence against women)

Posthumous Award

- German Moreno

Front Row Stars of the Night

- Piolo Pascual
- Lorna Tolentino

Finesse Look of the Night

- Robi Domingo
- Jean Garcia

Best New Female Artist

- Ysabelle Peach

Actor Par Excellence

- Piolo Pascual

Director Par Excellence

- Carlo J. Caparas

Screenplay Par Excellence

- Carlo J. Caparas
