= 34th Luna Awards =

2016 Philippine film awards ceremony

- Date: September 18, 2016
- Site: Quezon City Sports Club, Kristong Hari, Quezon City
- Hosted by: Rez Cortez

Highlights
- Best Picture: Heneral Luna
- Most awards: Heneral Luna (10)
- Most nominations: Heneral Luna (11)

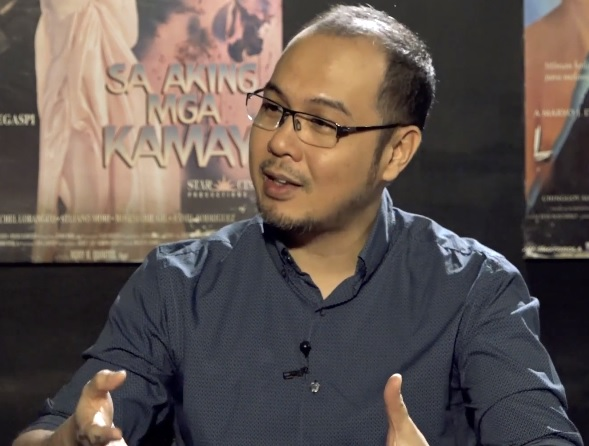
Jerrold Tarog, Best Director winner

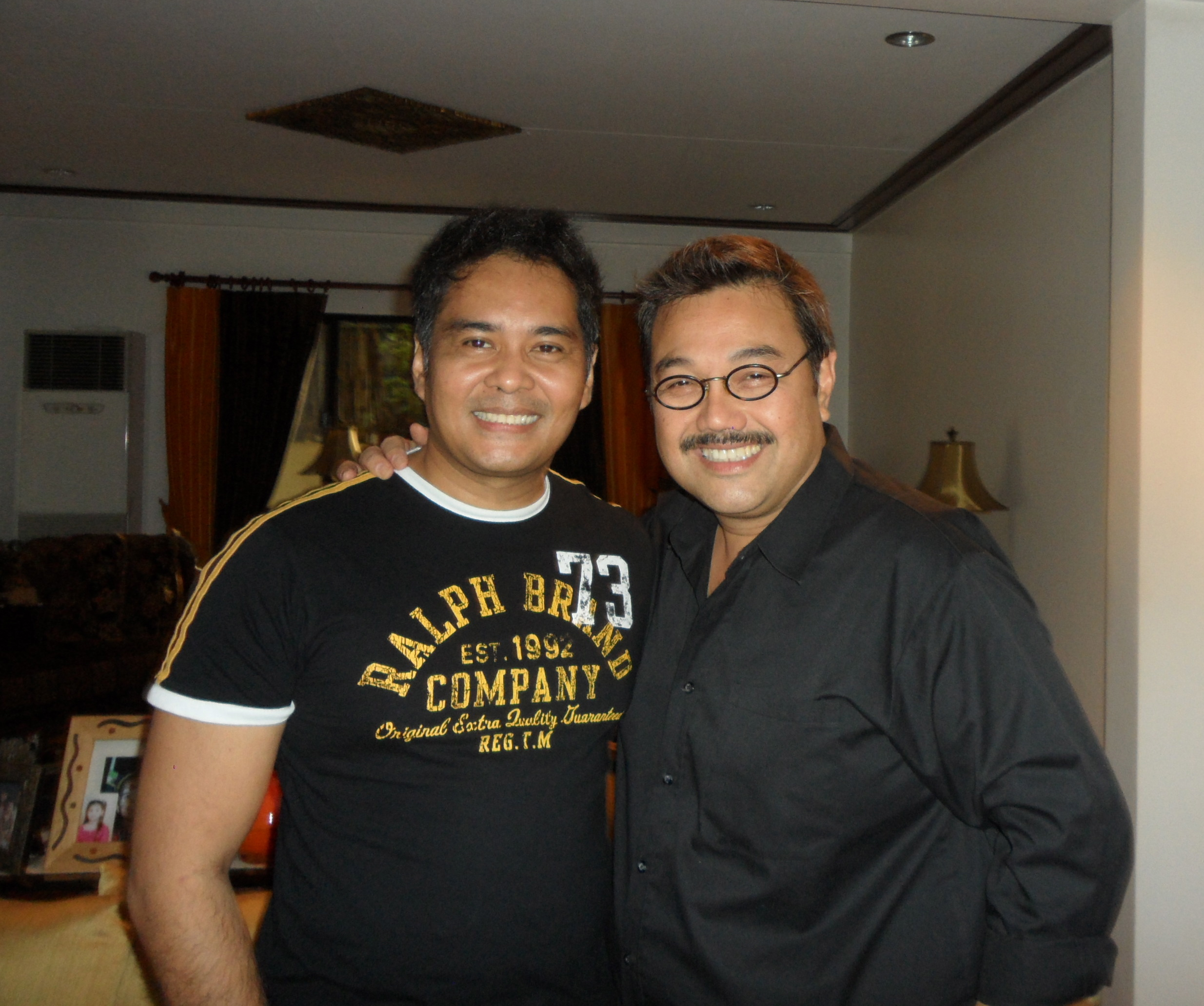
John Arcilla (left), Best Actor winner

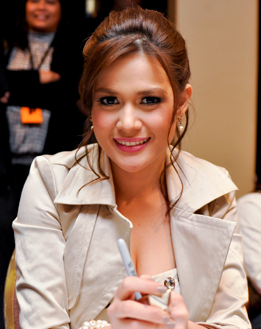
Bea Alonzo, Best Actress winner

The 34th Luna Awards ceremony, presented by the Film Academy of the Philippines (FAP), honored the best Filipino films of 2015. It took place on September 18, 2016, at the Quezon City Sports Club in Quezon City, Philippines. Actor and director Rez Cortez hosted the show.

== Winners and nominees ==
=== Awards ===
Winners are listed first, highlighted in boldface.

Best Picture	Best Direction
**Heneral Luna – Artikulo Uno**; Apocalypse Child; Crazy Beautiful You; Felix Manalo; Honor Thy Father; Kid Kulafu; The Breakup Playlist; The Love Affair; That Thing Called Tadhana	**Jerrold Tarog – Heneral Luna**; Antoinette Jadaone – That Thing Called Tadhana; Dan Villegas – The Breakup Playlist; Erik Matti – Honor Thy Father; Joel Lamangan – Felix Manalo; Mario Cornejo – Apocalypse Child; Nuel Naval – The Love Affair; Paul Soriano – Kid Kulafu
Best Actor	Best Actress
**John Arcilla – Heneral Luna** as Antonio Luna; Dennis Trillo - Felix Manalo as Felix Manalo; JM de Guzman - That Thing Called Tadhana as Anthony; John Lloyd Cruz - Honor Thy Father as Edgar; Robert ‘Buboy’ Villar - Kid Kulafu as Emmanuel; Sid Lucero - Apocalypse Child as Ford	**Bea Alonzo – The Love Affair** as Adrianne; Angelica Panganiban – That Thing Called Tadhana as Mace; Dawn Zulueta – The Love Affair as Tricia; Gwen Zamora – Apocalypse Child as Serena; Meryll Soriano – Honor Thy Father as Kaye
Best Supporting Actor	Best Supporting Actress
**Nonie Buencamino – Heneral Luna as Felipe Buencamino**; Allen Dizon – Imbisibol as Manuel; Bernardo Bernardo – Imbisibol as Benjie; Dennis Padilla – The Breakup Playlist as Joey David; JM de Guzman – Imbisibol as Rodel; RK Bagatsing – Apocalypse Child as Rich; Tirso Cruz III – Honor Thy Father as Bishop Tony	**Ana Abad-Santos – Apocalypse Child as Chona**; Alessandra de Rossi – Kid Kulafu as Dionisia Pacquiao; Annicka Dolonius – Apocalypse Child as Fiona; Ces Quesada – Imbisibol as Linda; Lorna Tolentino – Crazy Beautiful You as Dra. Leah Serrano; Mylene Dizon – Heneral Luna as Isabel; Rio Locsin – The Breakup Playlist as Marissa David
Best Screenplay	Best Cinematography
**Heneral Luna – Henry Francia, E.A. Rocha and Jerrold Tarog**; Crazy Beautiful You – Jancy Nicolas, Carmi Raymundo, Bianca Bernardino and Maan Dimaculangan-Fampulme; Felix Manalo – Bienvenido C. Santiago; Honor Thy Father – Michiko Yamamoto; That Thing Called Tadhana – Antoinette Jadaone; The Breakup Playlist – Antoinette Jadaone; The Love Affair – Vanessa R. Valdez	**Heneral Luna – Pong Ignacio**; Apocalypse Child – Ike Avellana; Ex with Benefits – Tey Clamor; Felix Manalo – Rody Lacap; Kid Kulafu – Odyssey Flores; Tragic Theater – Boy Yniguez
Best Production Design	Best Editing
**Heneral Luna – Benjamin Padero and Carlo Tabije**; Apocalypse Child – Cristina Dy; Felix Manalo – Edgar Martin Littaua; Honor Thy Father – Ericsson Navarro; Kid Kulafu – Joey Luna	**Heneral Luna – Jerrold Tarog**; Crazy Beautiful You – Marya Ignacio; Ex with Benefits – Benjamin Tolentino; Honor Thy Father – Jay Halili; Kid Kulafu – Mark Victor; That Thing Called Tadhana – Benjamin Tolentino; The Love Affair – Beng Bandong
Best Musical Score	Best Sound
**Heneral Luna – Jerrold Tarog**; Crazy Beautiful You – Jesse Lucas; Felix Manalo – Von de Guzman; Honor Thy Father – Erwin Romulo; Kid Kulafu – Robbie Factoran, Ricardo Jugo and Mark Villar; That Thing Called Tadhana – Emerzon Texon; Tragic Theater – Emerzon Texon	**Heneral Luna – Mikko Quizon**; Crazy Beautiful You – Arnel Labayo; Ex with Benefits – Arnel Labayo; Felix Manalo – Alberto Michael Idioma and Lamberto Casas Jr.; Kid Kulafu – Mikko Quizon; Para sa Hopeless Romantic – Bebet Casas and Roy Santos; That Thing Called Tadhana – Addiss Tabong; The Breakup Playlist – Addis Tabong; The Love Affair – Aurel Claro Bilbao; Tragic Theater – Alex Tomboc and Alberto Michael Idioma

=== Special awards ===
The following honorary awards were also awarded.

- Golden Reel Award – Vilma Santos-Recto
- Fernando Poe Jr. Lifetime Achievement Award – Emmanuel Borlaza
- Manuel de Leon Award for Exemplary Achievements – Herminio “Butch” Bautista
- Lamberto Avellana Memorial Award – Azucena “Nene” Vera Perez
- Plaque of Recognition – Jaclyn Jose
