= Segurista =

1996 drama film

Dead Sure
- Film poster
- Original title: Segurista
- Directed by: Tikoy Aguiluz
- Screenplay by: Jose Lacaba; Amado Lacuesta Jr.
- Story by: Tikoy Aguiluz; Jose Lacaba; Amado Lacuesta Jr.
- Produced by: Eric Cuatico
- Starring: Michelle Aldana
- Cinematography: Jun Dalawis
- Edited by: Mirana Medina-Bhunjun; Edgardo Vinarao
- Music by: Jessie Lasaten
- Production company: Neo Films
- Distributed by: Neo Films
- Release date: 13 March 1996
- Running time: 111 minutes
- Country: Philippines
- Language: Filipino

Segurista (International title: Dead Sure) is a 1996 Philippine neo-noir drama film directed by Tikoy Aguiluz. The film was co-written by Aguiluz, Jose Lacaba, and Amado Lacuesta and stars Michelle Aldana as the title role. Segurista was screened at the Toronto International Film Festival and the Singapore International Film Festival. In its home market, the MTRCB did not approve this motion picture for public viewing, "X-rated", but later approved it with cuts for Philippine theaters.

== Plot ==
By day, Karen Fernandez is a sales agent for an insurance company. She constantly meets sales targets set by her company and is considered their top agent. By night, she covertly works as an escort, which she uses to draw her daytime clients to buy into her insurance product. All of her activities day and night are to secure a future for her family. Amidst the temptation of falling in love with her clients, Karen focuses on money.

Resisting the advances of her friend's lover, she flees by riding a taxi, but the taxi driver brings Karen to a lahar-infested area to rape and kill her. Her death serves as a catalyst for change as her beneficiaries finally receive the payout she had collected.

== Cast ==
- Michelle Aldana as Karen Fernandez
- Gary Estrada as Sonny Reyes
- Ruby Moreno as Ruby Dimagiba
- Albert Martinez as Jake
- Julio Diaz as Eddie
- Pen Medina as Pepe Moreno
- Eddie Rodriguez as Lawyer
- Liza Lorena as Mrs. Librada
- Suzette Ranillo as Brian
- Teresa Loyzaga as Grace
- Anthony Castelo as Technocrat
- Roy de Guzman as Male Customer
- Manjo del Mundo as Caloy
- Celsar Bendigo as Joemar
- Evelyn Vargas as Candy
- Melisse Santiago as Winnie
- Vangie Labalan as Aling Choleng
- Pocholo Montes as Club Manager

== Awards ==
Dead Sure won seven awards in the 21st Gawad Urian Awards, including Best Picture, Best Director, Best Supporting Actor — Albert Martinez — Best Screenplay and Best Editing — Edgardo “Boy” Viñarao and Mirana Medina-Bhunjun.

The film was selected as the Philippines entry for the Best Foreign Language Film at the 69th Academy Awards, but was not accepted as a nominee.

== Continued interest and influence ==
When, at the end of the decade, eleven Filipino film critics rated the best films of the '90s for the Philippine Daily Inquirer, Segurista was ranked second.

=== Academia ===
Segurista has been cited in scholarly works on Risk Management, Game theory and CO_{2} utilization in products in Small Island Developing States.

Jema Pamintuan of Ateneo de Manila University, commented on how Segurista portrays, against a background of increasing female participation in the Philippine economy, the application of game-theoretic and probabilistic concepts for the Filipina struggling to manage the risk she faces in an economy characterized by a fluctuating economic and socio-political environment.
