= Your Place or Mine? (film) =

- Theatrical poster
- Directed by: Joel Lamangan
- Produced by: Vic Del Rosario Jr.
- Starring: Andi Eigenmann; Bret Jackson; Andre Paras
- Music by: Emerzon Texon
- Production company: VIVA Films
- Release date: April 29, 2015
- Running time: 105 minutes
- Country: Philippines
- Language: Filipino

Your Place or Mine? is a 2015 Filipino romantic comedy-drama film directed by Joel Lamangan and starring Andi Eigenmann, Bret Jackson, and Andre Paras. It was released by Viva Films on April 29, 2015.

== Cast ==
- Andi Eigenmann as Haley Saavedra
- Bret Jackson as Russell Sandoval
- Andre Paras as Seth Borromeo
- Anja Aguilar as Micah Angeles
- Donnalyn Bartolome as Jessica Villareal
- Jackie Lou Blanco as Amanda Saavedra
- Clint Bondad as Hans Saavedra
- Gerard Garcia as Ralph Sandoval
- Imee Hart as Vanessa
- Jovic Monsod as Vince Yu
- Ashley Rivera as Camille

== See also ==
- List of Filipino films in 2015
- List of Philippine films based on Wattpad stories
