= Ilocana Maiden =

- Promotional poster
- Directed by: Olive La Torre
- Screenplay by: Luciano B. Carlos; Conrado Conde; Willie P. Orfinada
- Story by: T. D. Agcaoili
- Produced by: Jose O. Vera
- Starring: Gloria Romero
- Cinematography: Steve Perez
- Edited by: Federico Arroyo
- Music by: Pastor de Jesus; Restie Umali; Conrado Conde; T. D. Agcaoili
- Distributed by: Sampaguita Pictures
- Release date: July 4, 1954 (Philippines)
- Running time: 120 minutes
- Country: Philippines
- Languages: Filipino; Ilocano

Ilocana Maiden (Filipino: Dalagang Ilocana) is a 1954 Filipino romantic comedy film directed by Olive La Torre and written by Luciano B. Carlos, Conrado Conde, and Willie P. Orfinada from a story developed by T. D. Agcaoili, who also wrote additional lyrics with Conde. It stars Gloria Romero, Ric Rodrigo, and Rudy Francisco, while the supporting cast includes Dolphy and Rebecca del Rio.

A black and white film produced and distributed by Sampaguita Pictures, a radio adaptation of the film was serialized on the DZRH Sampaguita Radio Program, and it also launched the career of Tita de Villa. It was theatrically released on July 4, 1954.

In 2021, the film was digitally restored and remastered by the Film Development Council of the Philippines (FDCP).

== Background ==
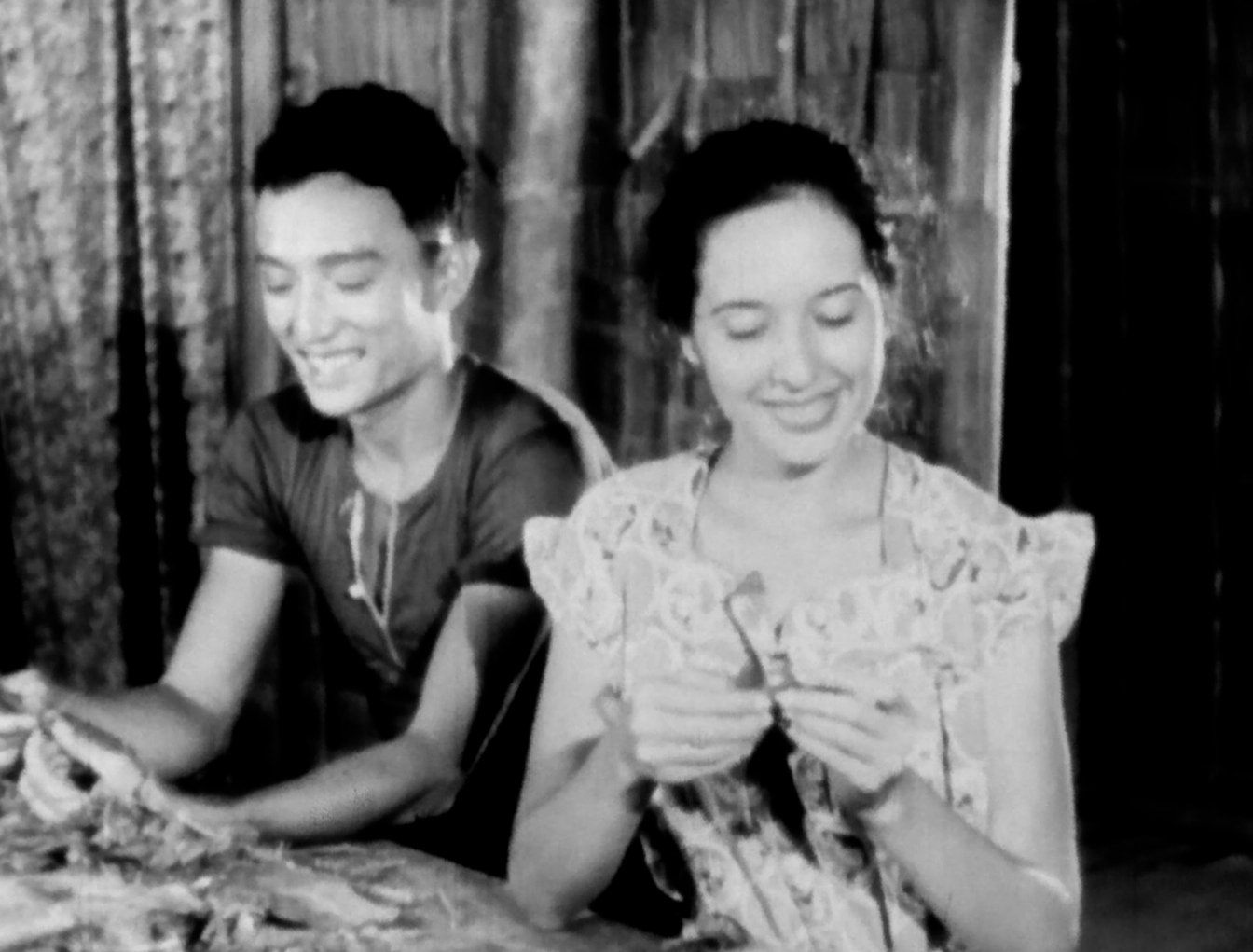
Dolphy and Gloria Romero In the film

Olive La Torre directed Gloria Romero as a country girl who rolls tobacco leaves into cigars for a living. Romero is a comedian, combining as she does a nose with eyes that slant. Dolphy has a role as a comic sidekick. The film, set in the lands of the Ilocos region, is also an advertisement for smoking, with seemingly everyone onscreen from the haciendero to the tobacco roller lighting up cigars made from uncut tobacco leaf; one character actually suffers asthma attacks if he can't get nicotine from the rolled cigars that only Romero knows how to make.

== Cast ==
- Gloria Romero — Biday
- Ric Rodrigo
- Dolphy — Kulas
- Tita de Villa
- Francisco Cruz
- Rudy Francisco
- Marcela Garcia
- Rebecca del Rio
- Horacio Morales
- Precy Ortega
- Leleng Isla

== Release ==
Ilocana Maiden was theatrically released in 1954. In late 2000, the film was aired on PTV as part of its SineGinto 2000 program in cooperation with the Advertising Foundation of the Philippines.

== Rediscovery ==
After it was long lost. The film was rediscovered through archives and a long restoration before being shown to the theatrical audience again. In the 1990s to 2000s, the SOFIA (Society of Filipino Archivists for Film) founded and somewhat successfully located the film then preserved it at the SOFIA headquarters.

== Accolades ==
FAMAS (Filipino Academy of Movie Arts and Sciences Awards)
Year	Category	Nominee	Result
FAMAS Awards	Best Actress	Gloria Romero	Won
