= Ex with Benefits =

- Theatrical movie poster
- Directed by: Gino M. Santos
- Screenplay by: Keiko Aquino; Jeff Stelton
- Story by: Kriz G. Gazmen
- Based on: Ex with Benefits by Ruth Mendoza
- Produced by: Charo Santos-Concio; Malou N. Santos; Enrico C. Santos; Vic del Rosario, Jr.
- Starring: Derek Ramsay; Coleen Garcia; Meg Imperial
- Cinematography: Tey Clamor
- Edited by: Benjamin Tolentino
- Music by: Emerzon Texon
- Production companies: Star Cinema; Viva Films; Skylight Films
- Distributed by: ABS-CBN Film Productions
- Release date: September 2, 2015
- Running time: 107 minutes
- Country: Philippines
- Languages: Filipino; English
- Box office: ₱145 million

Ex with Benefits is a 2015 Filipino romantic erotic drama film starring Derek Ramsay, Coleen Garcia and Meg Imperial. Based on a Wattpad story written by Ruth Mendoza, the screenplay was made by Keiko Aquino and Jeff Stelton and directed by Gino M. Santos. It was released on September 2, 2015, by Star Cinema (together with Skylight Films), and Viva Films.

== Plot ==
Adam Castrances and Arkisha Aragon met at medical school. The two fell in love with each other, until, Adam involved in a brawl with another student for defending Arkisha. Because of this Adam was suspended and lashes out on Arkisha, because his chances of taking Revalida blew. However, he was given another chance and on the day of taking Revalida, he saw Arkisha. But, she decided to ran away.

Ten years later, Adam, now a successful sports doctor and blogger and Arki, a medical representative reunited. Arkisha would offer Adam with a product. Adam, who had a relationship with Scarlet, make Arkisha jealous and she would confessed that she still loves Adam. Until Scarlet told Adam about Arkisha's scheme to make sales, sleeping with doctors. He would confront Arkisha about her scheme and talked about why she left Adam. When Arkisha left Adam, she suffered from depression and took her own life. At the time of loneliness, her father Jimmy became her strength. Until Jimmy suffered a mild stroke, Arkisha would be the breadwinner for her younger siblings as they would become impoverished since Jimmy got sick. She also confessed about what really happened when Adam got suspended. Arkisha asked for the college dean to lift his suspension, in exchange, Arkisha agreed to have sex with the dean. Jimmy was rushed to the hospital, and Arkisha resigned.

Afterwards, Adam is working as a professor in the medical school where he graduated. To his surprise, one of his students was Arkisha, whom after Jimmy's death, decided to be the parent of her siblings.

== Cast ==
- Derek Ramsay as Dr. Adam Jacob Castrances, MD
- Coleen Garcia as Arkisha Aragon
- Meg Imperial as Scarlet
- Rayver Cruz as Andrew
- Tirso Cruz III as Jimmy
- Carmi Martin as Bobby
- Kitkat as Genelyn
- Nina Ricci Alagao
- Juan Rodrigo
- Jobelle Salvador
- Menggie Cobarrubias

== See also ==
- List of Filipino films in 2015
- List of Philippine films based on Wattpad stories
