= Angela Markado (2015 film) =

Filipino revenge thriller film

- Directed by: Carlo J. Caparas
- Written by: Carlo J. Caparas
- Based on: Angela Markado by Jose F. Lacaba
- Starring: Andi Eigenmann
- Cinematography: Erwin Cruz
- Edited by: Bebs Gohetia
- Music by: Emerzon Texon
- Production company: Oro de Siete Films
- Distributed by: Viva Films
- Release date: December 2, 2015
- Country: Philippines
- Language: Filipino

Angela Markado is a 2015 Filipino revenge action thriller film written and directed by comic book writer Carlo J. Caparas. A remake of the 1980 film of the same name directed by Lino Brocka, it stars Andi Eigenmann as the titular character, alongside Paolo Contis, Felix Roco, Polo Ravales, CJ Caparas, Epy Quizon, Bembol Roco, Marita Zobel and Ana Roces. Produced by Oro de Siete Films, the film was released by Viva Films on December 2, 2015.

The film was nominated for 14 FAMAS Awards, including Best Picture, Best Director, and Best Actor for Contis, and won two: Best Actress for Eigenmann and Best Visual Effects.

== Cast ==
- Andi Eigenmann as Angela Markado
- Paolo Contis as Leo
- Felix Roco as Jack
- Polo Ravales as Bren
- CJ Caparas as Garrix
- Epy Quizon as Troy
- Bembol Roco as Benito
- Marita Zobel as Lola Maring (lit. 'Grandmother Maring')
- Ana Roces as Sylvia
- Bret Jackson as Bobby
- Mika dela Cruz as Imee
- Bugoy Cariño as Jimmy
- Ysabelle Peach as Sabel
- Buboy Villar as Jun
- Lyka Rueda-Acosta as SPO2 Rizza
- Luke Ocampo as Buddy

== Production ==
Toto Natividad served as a co-director on the film, while actress Ysabelle Peach served as assistant director.

Actress Andi Eigenmann prepared for the titular role by training in mixed martial arts at the Ultimate Fitness gym in Pasig, and admitted that she intentionally avoided watching the original 1980 film directed by Lino Brocka to avoid imitating Hilda Koronel's performance.

The rape scene in the film was toned down in comparison to the 1980 film as the filmmakers intended for an R-13 rating from the Movie and Television Review and Classification Board (MTRCB).

== Release ==
Angela Markado held its premiere at SM Megamall in Mandaluyong City on November 30, 2015, and was later released nationwide on December 2, 2015.

=== Critical response ===
Oggs Cruz, writing for Rappler, considered the film inferior to the original film directed by Lino Brocka, stating that Caparas' version "is vehemently shallow, a piece of pulp that refuses to be both profound and entertaining."

== Accolades ==
Group	Category	Name	Result
FAMAS Awards	Best Picture	Angela Markado	Nominated
FAMAS Awards	Best Director	Carlo J. Caparas	Nominated
FAMAS Awards	Best Actor	Paolo Contis	Nominated
FAMAS Awards	Best Actress	Andi Eigenmann	Won
FAMAS Awards	Best Supporting Actor	Epy Quizon	Nominated
FAMAS Awards	Best Supporting Actress	Ysabelle Peach	Nominated
FAMAS Awards	Best Screenplay	Carlo J. Caparas	Nominated
FAMAS Awards	Best Story	Carlo J. Caparas	Nominated
FAMAS Awards	Best Cinematography	Erwin Cruz	Nominated
FAMAS Awards	Best Editing	Bebs Gohetia	Nominated
FAMAS Awards	Best Sound	Junel Valencia	Nominated
FAMAS Awards	Best Music	Emerzon Texon	Nominated
FAMAS Awards	Best Production Design	Joy Abadeza	Nominated
FAMAS Awards	Best Visual Effects	Vincent Ilagan and Mike Velasquez	Won
