= Tikoy Aguiluz =

Filipino film director (1947–2024)

- Born: Amable Reyes Aguiluz VI; September 23, 1947; Philippines
- Died: February 18, 2024 (aged 76); Philippines
- Occupations: Film producer and director

Amable Reyes "Tikoy" Aguiluz VI (September 23, 1947 – February 18, 2024) was a Filipino film director, producer, screenwriter and cinematographer. In 1999, he founded the Cinemanila International Film Festival in Manila. Aguiluz was one of the leading figures in the alternative cinema movement in the Philippines.

== Life and career ==
Educated at the University of the Philippines (UP) with degrees in comparative literature and fine arts, he was the co-founder in 1976 of the UP Film Center (now UP Film Institute) where he served as its assistant director until 1990, spearheading the association called Chamber Film Group. He was a recipient of a John D. Rockefeller III Grant to study filmmaking at the New York University and film archiving at the Library of Congress Film Archives in Washington, DC and the Museum of Modern Art in New York. A British Council Grant led to further film studies and training in film archiving at the British Film Institute.

Aguiluz worked in various capacities in film projects with other important Filipino directors his senior, including National Artist Lino Brocka. He first made his mark with the 15-minute documentary Mt. Banahaw, Holy Mountain. The film won a Silver Trophy at the prestigious Young Filmmakers of Asia Festival in Iran.

Aguiluz plunged into the full-length feature in 1984 with the acclaimed Boatman. It was exhibited at the 1985 London Film Festival where it was cited as the outstanding film of the year. It was followed several years later, in 1995, by his own version of the story of the ill-fated household helper Flor Contemplacion in the equally acclaimed docu-drama entitled Bagong Bayani, OCW.

In 1996, his film Segurista (Dead Sure) was picked as the official Philippine entry to the Academy Awards for the Best Foreign-Language Film category. It placed 12th in the list of thirty-nine titles. The same film won the Best Director award for Aguiluz at the Gawad Urian (the local film critics award), as well as the Best Picture, Best Screenplay, Best Editing, Best Production Design and Best Supporting Actor plums, the last for actor Albert Martinez who played the title role. Segurista toured international film festivals in Toronto, Singapore and others. Aguiluz's next film project was originally intended to be a biographical film about Filipino revolutionary Andrés Bonifacio, to be titled Ang Supremo: The Life of Andrés Bonifacio with Caloocan mayor Rey Malonzo cast in the title role, but he eventually left the project; it was later directed by Lorli Villanueva as a television film in 2000.

Aguiluz's next film after Segurista became Rizal sa Dapitan (1997), a historical film on the Philippine national hero's poignant exile in Dapitan. The idea for the film was brought to Aguiluz by Antonio Samson, then the senior vice president of PLDT. It captured the majority of awards at the Philippine Movie Press Club's Star Awards for Movies and the Filipino Academy of Movie Arts and Sciences Annual Awards (FAMAS). The film was also shown at the First Philippine International Film Festival, at the Toronto International Film Festival, in Mar del Plata, Argentina and in Singapore. It continues its tour of world film capitals under the auspices of the Culture Committee of the UNESCO National Commission of the Philippines. When it competed at the Brussels International Film Festival (Festival International du Film Independent), it was conferred the Grand Jury Prize in addition to the best actor award for lead star Martinez.

Aguiluz served on the jury of the film festivals in Berlin, Pusan (South Korea), Singapore, Vesoul (France), Delhi, and Kerala in India, among others. He was the chief creative force behind the highly successful Cinemanila International Film Festival.

In 2003, the French government awarded Aguiluz the Chevalier dans l'Ordre des Arts et des Lettres prize for his contributions to Philippine cinema.

In 2013, the documentary film The Search for Weng Weng started its film festival run. In it Aguiluz was interviewed about the actor Weng Weng who was the Philippines' first international star and a unique figure in cinema, being a short person who performs death defying stunts.

On January 8, 2015, Aguiluz directorial effort Tragic Theater was released. The film is a supernatural horror film adaptation of the book of the same name, starring Andi Eigenmann, Christopher de Leon and John Estrada.

== Personal life ==
Aguiluz is the younger brother of computer scientist Amable R. Aguiluz V, founder of AMA University and presidential consultant on computer education during the Joseph Estrada administration.

Aguiluz died on February 18, 2024, at the age of 76.

== Film director ==
- Mt. Banahaw: Holy Mountain (short film, 1976)
- Boatman (1984)
- Father Balweg: Rebel Priest (1986)
- Bagong Bayani (1995)
- Segurista (1996)
- Rizal sa Dapitan (1997)
- Tatsulok (1998)
- 30 Views of Mt. Mayon (2000)
- Biyaheng Langit (2000)
- Tatarin (2001)
- www.XXX.com (2003)
- Manila Kingpin: The Asiong Salonga Story (2011)
- Superstar: The Nora Aunor Story (documentary, 2012)
- El Brujo (2015)
- Tragic Theater (2015)

== Accolades ==
Year	Award-giving body	Category	Work	Result
1996	Gawad Urian	Best Director	Segurista	Won
1997	FAMAS Awards	Best Director	Rizal sa Dapitan	Nominated
2011	Metro Manila Film Festival	Best Director	Manila Kingpin: The Asiong Salonga Story	Won
