= You're My Boss =

- Theatrical release poster
- Directed by: Antoinette Jadaone
- Written by: Antoinette Jadaone; Yoshke Dimen
- Based on: Concept by Celestine Gonzaga
- Produced by: Charo Santos-Concio; Malou N. Santos
- Starring: Toni Gonzaga; Coco Martin
- Cinematography: Hermann Claravall
- Edited by: Marya Ignacio
- Music by: Emerzon Texon
- Production companies: ABS-CBN Film Productions, Inc. CCM Film Productions
- Distributed by: Star Cinema
- Release date: April 4, 2015
- Running time: 117 minutes
- Country: Philippines
- Languages: Filipino; English
- Box office: ₱210 million (US$4.1 million)

You're My Boss is a 2015 Filipino romantic comedy film written and directed by Antoinette Jadaone starring Toni Gonzaga and Coco Martin. It was released on April 4, 2015, by Star Cinema.

== Plot ==
Georgina Lorenzana, an ambitious, driven, and bossy business woman, attends a meeting in which the President of the company says that he will be taking a two month leave, leaving Georgina to run the marketing department in the meantime. The President introduces Pong Dalupan to Georgina, who is the Chief Commercial Officer. Upon leaving, the President gives Georgina the task of getting Nipudu Air as a partner for the company in order to reach the Japanese market and connect their airline with the rest of the Japanese network.

Georgina then meets with the Nipudu Air investor, Mr. Najimoto in which he demands to see her boss and threatens to take the deal off the table on account of her boss not showing up. Pong then walks into the meeting room, giving Georgina the idea to pretend that Pong is the boss. After the initial meeting goes well, Georgina begins to train and prepare Pong in order to keep up the charade that Pong is the boss by changing his wardrobe and working on his conversational skills.

While Pong and Georgina bond with Mr. Najimoto to get him to partner with them, Pong and Georgina begin to bond and form a new friendship. In order to close the deal with Mr. Najimoto, Pong and Georgina must present how their airline can promote a non-tourist destination. In light of this, Pong and Georgina go to Batanes. During their time in Batanes, they visit the Honesty Coffee Shop, go sightseeing, and visit Pong’s family. After experiencing Batanes first hand, Georgina and Pong give a moving presentation which finally settles the deal between them and Mr. Najimoto. Before giving the handshake of agreement, Georgina comes clean about the charade that they had pulled. While Mr. Najimoto and the President of the Marketing Department are initially furious, but the latter informs Pong that they nevertheless got the deal, admiring the duo for owning up to their mistakes. Georgina tries to resign but the President doesn’t let her because Pong advocates for her to stay. Georgina realizes that Pong is the man she wants and goes after him to tell him that she loves him.

== Cast ==
- Toni Gonzaga as Georgina Lorenzana - Assistant Vice President for Marketing Affair
- Coco Martin as Pong Dalupan - Executive Secretary of the Airline Company
- Freddie Webb as Albert Chief - Commercial Officer President
- Gloria Sevilla as Lola - Pong's grandmother
- Adam Chan as Mr. Najimoto - The airline company's investor.
- Noel Trinidad as Lolo - Pong's grandfather
- Pepe Herrera as Tupe - Pong's cousin
- Jerald Napoles as Bojeck - Pong's friend
- Deniesse Joaquin as Georgina's Friend
- Via Antonio as Georgina's Friend
- Joan Palisoc as Georgina's Friend
- Angela Cortez as Georgina's Friend
- Jerome Tan as Japanese Entourage
- Yoshihiro Takaga as Japanese Entourage
- Tony Lao as Japanese Entourage
- Gerry Decayco as Mang Berto

=== Special participation ===
- JM de Guzman as Gino Andres - Georgina's ex-boyfriend.
- Regine Angeles as Sheila Rivera

== Theme song ==
- The official theme song of the film is Baby I Need Your Loving performed by Harana.

== Box office ==
The film earned ₱25 million on its opening day. After three days, the film had earned ₱65 million. It earned ₱100 million on its sixth day, despite strong competition from Fast and Furious 7. It was able to gross ₱200 million in its third week, earning a total gross of ₱210 million.

== See also ==
- List of Filipino films in 2015
