= The Love Affair (film) =

2015 drama film by Nuel C. Naval

- Theatrical movie poster
- Directed by: Nuel C. Naval
- Written by: Vanessa R. Valdez
- Produced by: Marizel Samson-Martinez (supervising)
- Starring: Richard Gomez; Dawn Zulueta; Bea Alonzo
- Cinematography: Anne Monzon
- Edited by: Beng Bandong
- Music by: Cesar Francis S. Concio
- Production company: Star Cinema
- Distributed by: ABS-CBN Film Productions
- Release date: August 12, 2015
- Running time: 125 minutes
- Country: Philippines
- Languages: Filipino; English
- Box office: ₱320 million (worldwide) (US$6.3 million)

The Love Affair is a 2015 Filipino drama film directed by Nuel C. Naval from a story and screenplay written by Vanessa R. Valdez. The film tells the story of a married couple whose marriage becomes problematic after Trisha has an affair and Vince consults with an attorney to file an annulment, but their meeting ends up in an affair as well. It stars Richard Gomez, Dawn Zulueta and Bea Alonzo in the lead roles, and features Tom Rodriguez, Tonton Gutierrez, and Grae Fernandez in supporting roles.

Produced and distributed by ABS-CBN Film Productions, the film was theatrically released in the Philippines on August 12, 2015, It received mixed reviews from critics but favorable reception at the box-office, earning ₱320 million worldwide and is the second Filipino film to break the ₱300 million mark for 2015, second to Crazy Beautiful You, another Star Cinema-produced film.

== Plot ==
Vince, a well-known surgeon, becomes angry when he discovers his wife Trisha is having an affair with his best friend Greg. His relationship with Trisha reached a low point, and he decided to annul their marriage. Meanwhile, Adie, a young lawyer, received a message and discovered that her fiancé, Ryan, was having an affair with another woman before their wedding. While on her way home and still traumatized from what she read, she got into a vehicular accident. At the hospital, she revealed that she had a miscarriage. Because of these unfortunate events she got, Adie got separated from her fiancé, called off their wedding, and resigned from her position.

On that same day, Vince is present and convinces Noah that if he and Adie won the race, he would hire Adie in his law firm.

== Cast ==
Main cast

- Richard Gomez as Vince Ramos: A surgeon
- Dawn Zulueta as Patricia "Trisha" Ramos: Vince's wife
- Bea Alonzo as Atty. Adrianne "Adie" Valiente

Supporting cast

- Tonton Gutierrez as Greg
- Tom Rodriguez as Ryan Singson: Adie's fiancé until he committed an affair before their wedding
- Victor Silayan as Noah Castillo
- Al Tantay as Pancho Valiente
- Ana Capri as Carla
- Grae Fernandez as Timmy Ramos
- Jane Oineza as Cassie Ramos
- Manolo Pedrosa as Miguel Ramos
- Andrei Garcia as Adrian Ramos: Vince and Trisha's deceased son
- Ina Feleo as Joyce
- Kim Molina as Lindsay
- Eda Nolan as Jane
- Miguel Faustman as Jaime
- Evangeline Pascual as Isabel
- Tetchie Agbayani as Wilma
- Khalil Ramos as Enzo
- Hannah Ledesma as Andrea
- Alex Medina as Alvin
- Roeder Camanag as Eddie
- Marina Benipayo as counselor
- Ariel Ureta as Vince's mentor
- Lloyd Sanmartino as Tricia's doctor
- Joel Molina as Jun
- Edgar Allan Yu as doctor
- Hiyasmin Neri as Gelai
- France Bonnin as Rosan
- Olive Isidro as Joan
- Liz Alindogan as Mildred
- Joyce So as Georgia
- Peewee O'Hara as wife
- Jerry O'Hara as husband
- Cons Castaneda as sailor

== Reception ==
=== Box office ===
Based on the statistics gathered by Box Office Mojo, the film earned ₱170 million domestically after four weeks of showing in cinemas. Overall, the film grossed ₱320 million at the box office from both local and international screenings.

=== Critical reception ===
Florence Pia Yu, writing for Gulf News, gave praise to the performance of the lead stars, where they "really did justice to their characters in this movie, delivering believable acting that made you want to root for all of them" as well as the emotional impact on the audience for its confrontational and intimate scenes.

== See also ==
- List of Filipino films in 2015
