= Andi Eigenmann =

Filipino actress and model (born 1990)

- Born: Andrea Nicole Guck Eigenmann; June 25, 1990 (age 36); Marikina, Metro Manila, Philippines
- Education: De La Salle–College of Saint Benilde
- Occupations: Actress; model
- Years active: 2005–2018
- Agents: Star Magic; (2005–2017); Viva Artists Agency; (2012–2018)
- Partners: Jake Ejercito (2011–2014); Emilio Arambulo (2017–2018); Philmar Alipayo (2018–present)
- Children: 3
- Parents: Mark Gil; Jacklyn Jose
- Family: Eigenmann family

Andrea "Andi" Nicole Guck Eigenmann (Tagalog: [ˈʔandi ˈaɪɡɛnmɐn]; born June 25, 1990), is a Filipino former actress, model, and social media influencer.

== Early life ==
=== Descent and family ===
Andrea Nicole Guck Eigenmann is the daughter of actors Mark Gil (1961–2014) and Jaclyn Jose (1963–2024), and is a half-sister of actors Sid Lucero, Gabby Eigenmann and Max Eigenmann from Mark Gil's side. Her aunt from her mother's side is actress Veronica Jones. She has German-American ancestry from her mother, and Swiss and Spanish ancestry from her father.

=== Education ===
She graduated elementary in 2004 and high school in 2008 at the basic education department of Miriam College in Katipunan, Quezon City. After finishing high school, she studied Bachelor of Arts major in Fashion Design and Merchandising (AB-FDM) at De La Salle-College of Saint Benilde.

== Career ==
In 2005, Eigenmann started her showbiz career in an appearance in an episode of Wansapanataym entitled D' Supers. She was also in the soap opera Prinsesa ng Banyera where she played the role of Sandy. In 2008, she appeared in the reality show Pinoy Big Brother: Teen Edition Plus. She was the second house player to enter the house and was evicted on day 53. In 2009, she was one of the 12 finalists of the MYX VJ Search 2009. In 2010, she played the lead and title role in the fantasy drama series, Agua Bendita, in which she played the dual role of twin sisters Agua and Bendita.

Eigenmann went on to play various characters in eight episodes of the long-running musical anthology series, Your Song. In addition, she appeared in two Regal Films in 2010: Mamarazzi and Shake, Rattle and Roll XII. Eigenmann co-starred as Gabrielle "Gabby" Marcelo in the 2011 critically acclaimed family military drama series "Minsan Lang Kita Iibigin", together with Maja Salvador and Coco Martin.

After giving birth, Eigenmann returned to acting via Kahit Puso'y Masugatan in 2012, along with Gabby Concepcion, Jake Cuenca and Iza Calzado. In the same year, she also starred in a horror film Pridyider with Janice de Belen and JM de Guzman under Regal Films, and in a romantic drama film A Secret Affair with Derek Ramsay and Anne Curtis produced by Viva Films. Before A Secret Affair, Eigenmann signed a contract with Viva Artists Agency, a talent management of Viva Entertainment, where her mother Jaclyn Jose came from. In 2013, she top-billed the daytime fantasy horror drama series Galema: Anak ni Zuma, and later appeared in the 2014 fantasy drama series Dyesebel.

In 2015, she starred in a lead role in Maalaala Mo Kaya with first time leading man Jake Cuenca.

In October 2017, Eigenmann revealed that she was quitting the "artista life," but she later clarified it is the lifestyle of showbiz that she is quitting, not acting altogether. However, in 2018 she starred in The Maid in London, her last film before she left the limelight for good.

== Personal life ==
On 23 November 2011, Eigenmann gave birth to a daughter named Adrianna Gabrielle "Ellie" Eigenmann via Caesarean section. When asked about the child's paternity, Eigenmann claimed that actor Jake Ejercito, son of former President Joseph Estrada, is the father of her daughter Ellie, saying that "he was there since the beginning and he loves my daughter like his own, and so he's the father." Eigenmann said that she never took a DNA paternity test for her child. Eigenmann and Ejercito split in 2014.

In 2018, Eigenmann entered into a relationship with professional surfer Philmar Alipayo. On 23 July 2019, she gave birth to her second child and first with Alipayo, a daughter named Keliana Alohi "Lilo" Eigenmann Alipayo. In August 2020, Eigenmann announced she was pregnant with her third child and second with Alipayo. The couple announced in a video on their YouTube channel released 13 December 2020 that the child is a boy. Eigenmann and Alipayo then announced via Instagram on 20 December that they were engaged. On 17 January 2021, Andi gave birth to her third child, a boy named Koa, announcing it on her Instagram account on 19 January. The family is based in Siargao.

== Filmography ==
=== Film ===
Year	Title	Role	Notes	Source
2010	Mamarazzi	Strawberry / Peachy		
2010	Shake, Rattle and Roll 12	Andrea	"Isla" segment	
2012	Pridyider	Tina Benitez		
2012	A Secret Affair	Samantha 'Sam' Montinola		
2013	When the Love Is Gone	Jenny Luis		
2013	Coming Soon	Monica		
2013	Momzillas	Rina Capistrano-Del Valle		
2014	Bob Ong's ABNKKBSNPLAko? The Movie	Special someone		
2015	Tragic Theater	Annie Francisco		
2015	Your Place or Mine?	Haley Saavedra		
2015	Angela Markado	Angela Markado		
2016	Ma' Rosa	Raquel Reyes		
2016	Camp Sawi	Clarisse		
2018	The Maid in London	Margo		
2018	All Souls Night	Shirley		

=== Television ===
Year	Title	Role	Notes	Source
2005	Wansapanataym: D' Supers			
2007–2008	Prinsesa ng Banyera	Sandy		
2008	Pinoy Big Brother: Teen Edition Plus	Herself / House player		
2010	Rod Santiago's Agua Bendita	Agua Cristi / Bendita Cristi		
2010	Maalaala Mo Kaya	Christine		
2010	Your Song Presents: Andi	Multiple characters		
2011	Minsan Lang Kita Iibigin	Gabrielle "Gabby" Marcelo		
2012–2013	Kahit Puso'y Masugatan	Veronica Salvacion		
2013	Maalaala Mo Kaya	Lyka		
2013–2014	Jim Fernandez's Galema, Anak ni Zuma	Galema Castillo-Villalobos		
2014	Mars Ravelo's Dyesebel	Betty Reyes		
2015	Maalaala Mo Kaya	Diane		
2015	Ipaglaban Mo!	Gina		
2016	Ipaglaban Mo!	Violy		
2016	Maalaala Mo Kaya	Judy		
2016	From the Beautiful Country	Justine Manalastas		
2016–2017	The Greatest Love	Lizelle G. Alegre / Lizelle G. Alcantara-Sobrevista		
2018	Celebrity Bluff	Herself / Player	First post-appearance on GMA	
2018	Eat Bulaga!	Herself / Guest Player		

== Awards and nominations ==
Year	Work	Award	Category	Result	Source
2010	Juicy! (TV5)	2010's Most Promising Young Star (#1)		Won	
2010	Juicy! (TV5)	2010's Breakthrough Artists (#5)		Won	
2010		58th FAMAS Awards	German Moreno Youth Achievement Award (shared with Matteo Guidicelli)	Won	
2010		YES! Magazine's 100 Beautiful Stars	71st Most Beautiful Star	Won	
2011	Mamarazzi	8th Golden Screen Awards	Breakthrough Performance by an Actress	Nominated	
2011		2011 GMMSF Box-Office Entertainment Awards	Most Promising Female Star of the Year	Won	
2011		Studio 23 Barkada Choice Awards	Breakthrough Artist of the Year	Nominated	
2011		Yahoo Philippines OMG! Awards	Breakthrough Female Artist	Nominated	
2011		Golden Screen TV Awards	Outstanding Breakthrough Performance by an Actress	Nominated	
2013	A Secret Affair	62nd FAMAS Awards	Best Actress	Nominated	
2013	A Secret Affair	31st Luna Awards	Best Supporting Actress	Nominated	
2014		MEGA Magazine's 10 Most Beautiful	Most Beautiful	Won	
2017	Ma' Rosa	35th Luna Awards	Best Supporting Actress	Nominated	
