= Tragic Theater =

2015 Filipino film

- Theatrical release poster
- Directed by: Tikoy Aguiluz
- Written by: G.M. Coronel
- Based on: Tragic Theater by G.M. Coronel
- Produced by: Vincent del Rosario III
- Starring: Andi Eigenmann; Christopher de Leon; John Estrada
- Cinematography: Boy Yñiguez
- Edited by: Rolando Eucasion; Mirana Medina
- Music by: Emerzon Q. Texon
- Production company: VIVA Films
- Release date: January 8, 2015
- Running time: 95 minutes
- Country: Philippines
- Language: Filipino

Tragic Theater is a 2015 Filipino supernatural horror film directed by Tikoy Aguiluz, based on the book of the same name written by G.M. Coronel, and starring Andi Eigenmann, Christopher De Leon and John Estrada. It was released on January 8, 2015, by Viva Films.

== Plot ==
In 1981, a group of construction workers were building a theater when the ceiling collapsed; many survived, but more than a hundred men died when the ceiling fell upon them. They were buried beneath the theater.

In 1999, Annie (Andi Eigenmann), an engineer, wants to consult a group of exorcists and spirit mediums led by Nilo Marcelo (John Estrada), a priest, to help her gather information about an old theater with a dark past before she starts her project there.

But things got worse when she left the circle and is now being possessed by a demon.

== Cast ==
- Andi Eigenmann as Annie Francisco
- Christopher de Leon as Bishop Miguel Sanchez Agcaoili
- John Estrada as Fr. Nilo Marcelo
- Lander Vera-Perez as Annie's Father
- Janna Victoria as Annie's Aunt
- Gabe Mercado as Erwin Manabat
- Roxanne Barcelo as Arlene de Lara
- Josh Padilla as Norman Abalos
- Chloe Dauden as Teresa Manalad
- Jovic Monsod as Mick Toledo
- Sara Polverini as Lana Cristobal
- Jourdaine Castillo as Joanna
- Sheng Belmonte as Kate Celis
- Carissa Quintas as Armie Ronquillo
- Janna Roque as Ruth Rivera
- Arvic Rivero as Marlo Orlindo
- Pio Balbuena as Nanding Jabinal
- Clint Bondad as Gil Sanlo
- Mark Christopher Israel as Construction Worker
- Orlando Sol as Samuel Indanan
- Gabriel de Leon as Elden Almario

== See also ==
- List of ghost films
