= Para sa Hopeless Romantic =

- Theatrical movie poster
- Directed by: Andoy Ranay
- Screenplay by: Mel Mendoza-Del Rosario; Mary Rose Colindres
- Story by: Marcelo Santos III
- Based on: Para sa Hopeless Romantic by Marcelo Santos III
- Produced by: Vic del Rosario Jr.; Charo Santos-Concio; Malou N. Santos
- Starring: James Reid; Nadine Lustre; Iñigo Pascual; Julia Barretto
- Cinematography: Pao Orendain
- Edited by: Carlo Francisco Manatad
- Music by: Myke Salomon
- Production companies: Viva Films; ABS-CBN Film Productions
- Distributed by: Viva Films; Star Cinema
- Release date: May 13, 2015
- Running time: 105 minutes
- Country: Philippines
- Languages: English; Filipino
- Box office: ₱8 million (Opening Day); ₱50 million

Para sa Hopeless Romantic is a 2015 Philippine teen romance film based on the best-selling romantic novel of the same name by Marcelo Santos III. The film is directed by Andoy Ranay, starring James Reid, Nadine Lustre, Iñigo Pascual and Julia Barretto. It was distributed by Viva Films and Star Cinema and was released on May 13, 2015, in select theaters across the Philippines.

== Summary ==
Becca (Nadine Lustre) thought that she had everything she could wish for in her life, until Nikko (James Reid) broke up with her. Everything in her life starts to fall apart. To recover, she started writing a story about Ryan (Inigo Pascual), a boy who harbors a secret crush on his best friend Maria (Julia Barretto). But before he can tell her his real feelings for her, he got into an accident and fell into a coma. Can all four of them find the "happy ending" that each one of them has been hoping for?

== Cast ==
=== Main cast ===
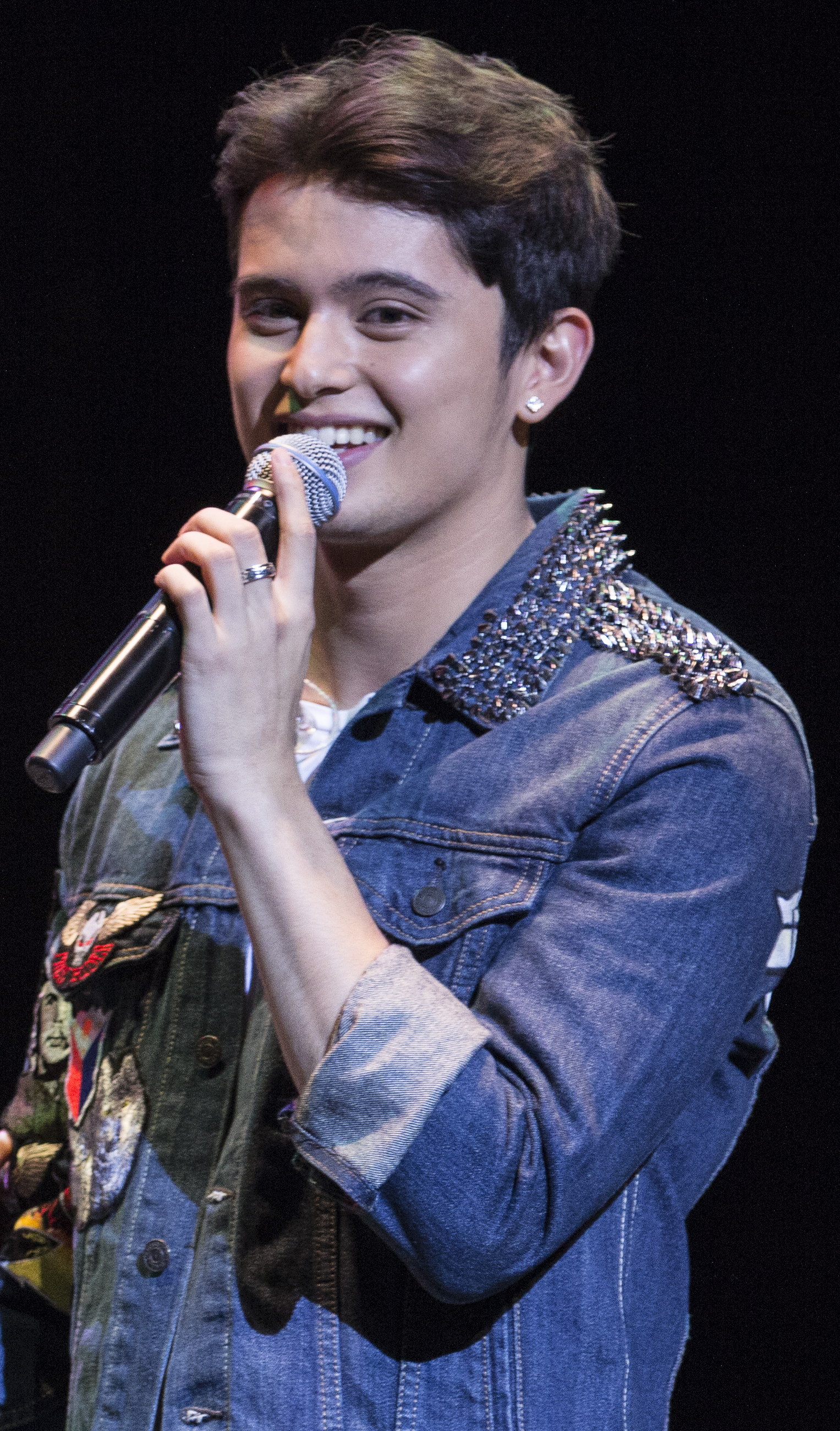
James Reid portrays Nikko John Borja

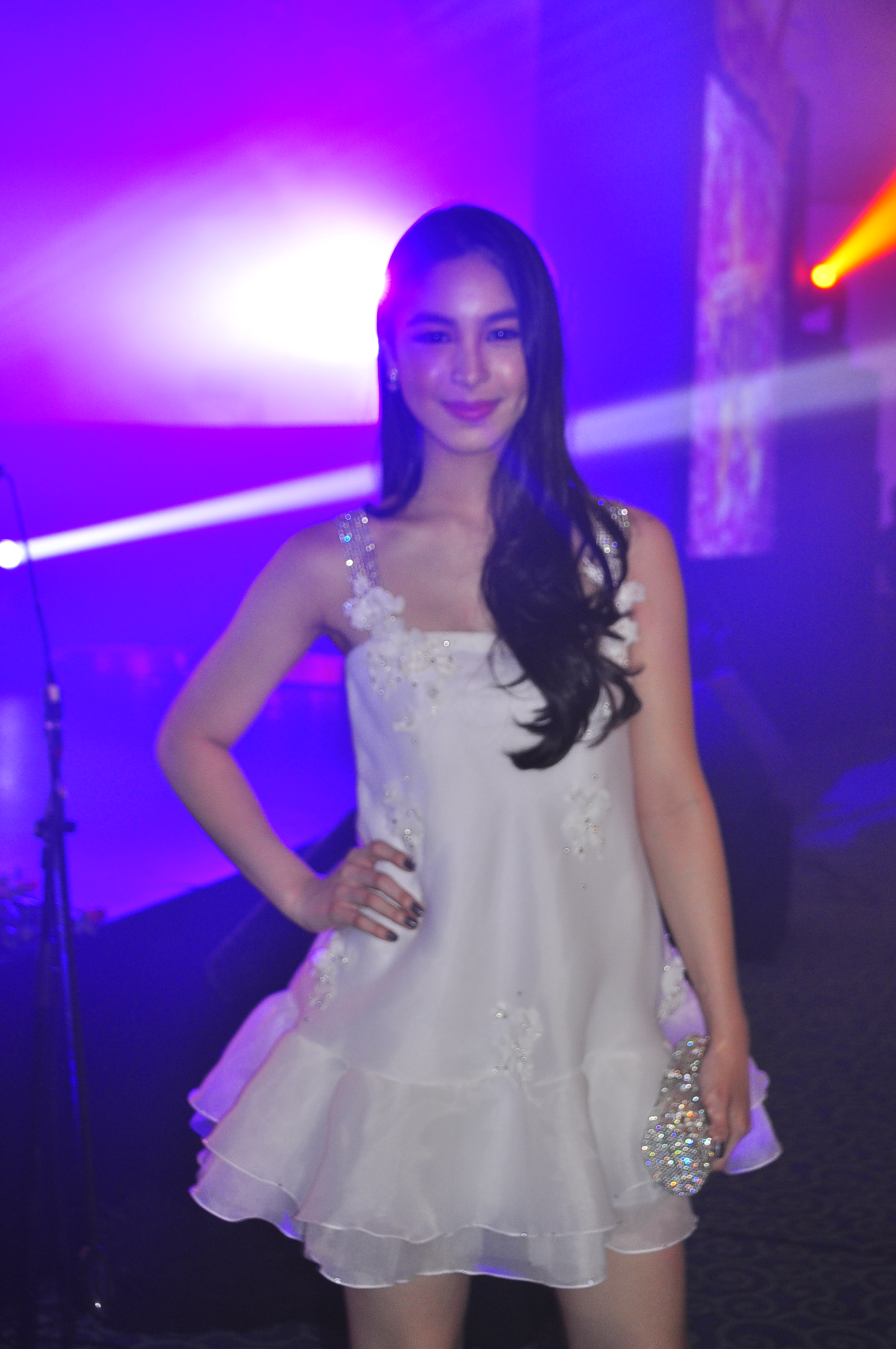
Julia Barretto portrays Maria Kristina Lapuz

- James Reid as Nikko John Borja
- Nadine Lustre as Rebecca "Becca" Del Mundo
- Julia Barretto as Maria Kristina Lapuz
- Iñigo Pascual as Ryan Sebastian

=== Supporting cast ===
- AJ Muhlach as RJ Bustamante
- Shy Carlos as Jackie Reyes
- Jackie Lou Blanco as Nikko's mom
- Teresa Loyzaga as Becca's mom
- Lander Vera Perez as Becca's dad
- Cherie Gil as Miss Katigbak
- Paul Jake Castillo as Matt
- Anja Aguilar as Micah
- Donnalyn Bartolome as Betty
- Issa Pressman as former classmate of Becca
- Arvic Rivero as Onyok
- Jourdaine Castillo as Faye
- Marcelo Santos III as Editor-in-Chief

== Release ==
The film's release was changed a number of times. It was originally scheduled to be released in January 2015, then it was moved to March 2015. Then finally, Star Cinema changed its original release date and moved it to May 13, 2015.

== Reception ==
=== Critical response ===
Para Sa Hopeless Romantic received mixed reviews from movie critics.

Oggs Cruz from Rappler called the movie "decent, harmless, and authentically perceptive", indicating that the movie is less needlessly complicated and is defiantly anchored in reality, which sets it apart from other romance movie, saying: "Perhaps the most remarkable thing about Para sa Hopeless Romantic is how it feels defiantly anchored in reality. While the rest of romantic comedies seem to be situated in an alternate Philippines where everything is glittered and glossy, giving them all their well-to-do characters reasons to be concerned with love instead of other more pressing things, Ranay’s film is set in a world that is more familiar and more palpable."

Cruz also praised lead actress Nadine Lustre's performance, noting the sincerity in her portrayal of Becca, stating "Lustre makes her character’s seemingly unimportant struggle moving. She laments not being able to move on, to the point of creating grim stories about the futility of love. She weeps with utmost determination and sincerity, and giggles with glee when presented with an opportunity of finding a brand new romance through ridiculous conversations via chair-bound graffiti."

Philbert Ortiz-Dy of Click the City meanwhile gave a negative review of the film, stating that Para Sa Hopeless Romantic is mainly hopeless. He further states, "And so the whole story is just about waiting for two people to get back together, even though it isn't entirely clear why they ought to be together. There isn't much reason to root for this outcome. The film doesn't invest much in their happiness as a couple. The film uses talk of destiny to wave away the lack of actual story development" Dy further tweeted that the film was "hopeless, yes, romantic, no."

== Box office ==
According to Rod Magaru, the film had one of the lowest earnings of a Viva produced, Star Cinema merged movie earning P8M on its opening day and debuting in second place behind Pitch Perfect 2. The latest update from Box Office Mojo puts the total gross at approximately P50M.
