= List of Philippine films of 2010 =

This is an incomplete list of Filipino full-length films, both mainstream and independently produced, released in theaters and cinemas in 2010.

== Films ==
Title	Director	Cast	Genre	Studio	Release date
666	Honey Blanca, Celso Ad. Castillo	Roldan Aquino, Honey Blanca, Crystal Castillo, Cris Daluz, Jaclyn Jose, Brando Legaspi, Lovely Rivero	Horror	Honey Blanca Productions	July 7
Ang Tanging Ina Mo (Last na 'To!)	Wenn V. Deramas	Ai-Ai de las Alas, Eugene Domingo, Marvin Agustin, Nikki Valdez, Carlo Aquino, Alwyn Uytingco, Shaina Magdayao, Serena Dalrymple, Jiro Manio, Xyriel Manabat, Kaye Abad	Comedy	Star Cinema	December 25
Antipo	Joseph Laban	Roderick Cabrido	Drama; live-action short		May 2010, at the 2010 Cannes Film Festival
Babe, I Love You	Mae Cruz	Anne Curtis, Sam Milby	Romance	Star Cinema and VIVA Films	April 3
Cinco	Frasco Mortiz; Enrico Santos; Cathy Garcia-Molina; Ato Bautista; Nick Olanka	Mariel Rodriguez, Rayver Cruz, Maja Salvador, Jodi Sta. Maria-Lacson, Zanjoe Marudo, Pokwang, Robi Domingo, Sam Concepcion, AJ Perez	Horror	Star Cinema	July 14
Dalaw	Dondon Santos	Kris Aquino, Diether Ocampo, Alessandra De Rossi, Karylle, Gina Pareño, Empress Schuck, Bernard Palanca, Precious Lara Quigaman	Horror, suspense	Star Cinema and CineMedia	December 25
Father Jejemon	Frank Gray, Jr.	Dolphy	Comedy	RVQ Productions	December 25
Hating Kapatid	Wenn V. Deramas	Judy Ann Santos, Sarah Geronimo	Drama, comedy	VIVA Films	July 21
Here Comes the Bride	Chris Martinez	Eugene Domingo, Angelica Panganiban, John Lapus, Tuesday Vargas, Jaime Fabregas	Comedy, adult comedy	Star Cinema, OctoArts Films and Quantum Films	May 12
I Do	Veronica B. Velasco	Enchong Dee, Erich Gonzales, Pokwang, Melai Cantiveros	Drama	Star Cinema	September 29
I'll Be There	Maryo J. Delos Reyes	Gabby Concepcion, KC Concepcion, Jericho Rosales	Drama	Star Cinema	June 16
In Your Eyes	Mac Alejandre	Anne Curtis, Claudine Barretto, Richard Gutierrez	Romance, drama	GMA Films and VIVA Films	August 18
Mamarazzi	Joel Lamangan	Eugene Domingo, John Lapus, AJ Perez, Andi Eigenmann	Comedy	Regal Entertainment	August 25
My Amnesia Girl	Cathy Garcia-Molina	John Lloyd Cruz, Toni Gonzaga	Romantic comedy	Star Cinema	November 24
Miss You like Crazy	Cathy Garcia-Molina	John Lloyd Cruz, Bea Alonzo, Maricar Reyes	Romance	Star Cinema	February 24
Noy	Dondon Santos	Coco Martin, Cherry Pie Picache, Joem Bascon	Documentary, drama	Star Cinema and CineMedia	June 2
Paano na Kaya	Ruel S. Bayani	Gerald Anderson, Kim Chiu, Melissa Ricks	Romance, drama	Star Cinema	January 27
Petrang Kabayo	Wenn V. Deramas	Vice Ganda, Luis Manzano, Gloria Romero, Tom Rodriguez, Sam Pinto	Comedy	VIVA Films	October 13
Rosario	Albert Martinez	Jennylyn Mercado, Dennis Trillo, Yul Servo, Sid Lucero, Isabel Oli	Drama, epic	Cinemabuhay International and Studio 5	December 25
RPG Metanoia	Louie Suarez	Zaijian Jaranilla, Aga Muhlach, Eugene Domingo, Vhong Navarro	Adventure, fantasy	Star Cinema, Ambient Media and Thaumatrope Animation	December 25
Sa 'yo Lamang	Laurice Guillen	Lorna Tolentino, Christopher de Leon, Bea Alonzo, Coco Martin, Diether Ocampo, Enchong Dee, Shaina Magdayao, Zanjoe Marudo	Drama	Star Cinema	September 1
Shake, Rattle and Roll XII	Zoren Legaspi; Topel Lee; Jerrold Tarog	Shaina Magdayao, Andi Eigenmann, Carla Abellana, Rayver Cruz, John Lapus, Sid Lucero, Nash Aguas, Ricky Davao	Horror	Regal Entertainment	December 25
Si Agimat at si Enteng Kabisote	Tony Y. Reyes	Vic Sotto, Bong Revilla, Gwen Zamora, Sam Pinto, Jillian Ward	Comedy, action	GMA Films, APT Entertainment, M-Zet Productions, OctoArts Films and Imus Productions	December 25
Till My Heartaches End	Jose Javier Reyes	Gerald Anderson, Kim Chiu	Romance, drama	Star Cinema	October 27
White House	Topel Lee	Gabby Concepcion, Maricar Reyes, Iza Calzado, Janus del Prado, Mo Twister, Lovi Poe, Sarah Lahbati, Megan Young	Horror	Regal Entertainment	October 20
Working Girls	Jose Javier Reyes	Eugene Domingo, Iza Calzado, Ruffa Gutierrez, Jennylyn Mercado, Cristine Reyes, Eula Valdez, Bianca King	Romantic comedy	GMA Films, VIVA Films and Unitel Pictures	April 21
You to Me Are Everything	Mark A. Reyes	Marian Rivera, Dingdong Dantes	Romantic comedy	GMA Films and Regal Entertainment	May 5

== Award ceremonies ==
Award ceremony	Best Picture	Best Director	Best Actor	Best Actress	Best Supporting Actor	Best Supporting Actress	Best Screenplay	Ref.
59th FAMAS Awards	Ang Tanging Ina Mo (Last na 'To!)	Albert Martinez Rosario	John Lloyd Cruz Miss You like Crazy	Ai-Ai de las Alas Ang Tanging Ina Mo (Last na 'To!)	Eugene Domingo Here Comes the Bride	Allen Dizon SIGWA	Bonifacio Ilagan SIGWA	

== See also ==
- 2010 in the Philippines
- List of 2010 box office number-one films in the Philippines
