= 2011 FAMAS Awards =

Annual Filipino film awards ceremony

59th FAMAS Awards
- Date: Saturday, December 10, 2011
- Site: Tanghalang Leandro Locsin, National Commission for Culture and the Arts, Intramuros, Manila

Highlights
- Best Picture: Ang Tanging Ina Mo: Last Na 'To!
- Most awards: Si Agimat at si Enteng Kabisote (4)
- Most nominations: Rosario (15)

The 59th Filipino Academy of Movie Arts and Sciences Awards Night was held on December 10, 2011 at Tanghalang Leandro Locsin, National Commission for Culture and the Arts, Intramuros, Manila.

Ang Tanging Ina Mo: Last Na 'To!, produced by Malou Santos and Charo Santos-Concio, is the recipient of this edition's FAMAS Award for Best Picture.

== Awards ==
=== Major awards ===
Winners are listed first and highlighted with boldface.

Best Picture	Best Director
**Ang Tanging Ina Mo: Last Na 'To! — Charo Santos-Concio, Malou Santos**; Sa 'yo Lamang — Charo Santos-Concio, Malou Santos; Dalaw — Charo Santos-Concio, Malou Santos, Kris Aquino; Rosario — Albert Martinez, Ernesto 'Bong' Sta. Maria Jr.; Miss You Like Crazy — Charo Santos-Concio, Malou Santos; Sigwa — Pelita Peralta-Uy, Stanley T. Uy	**Albert Martinez — Rosario**; Rodel Nacianceno, Dondon S. Santos — Noy; Cathy Garcia-Molina — Miss You Like Crazy; Wenn V. Deramas — Ang Tanging Ina Mo: Last Na 'To!; Laurice Guillen — Sa 'yo Lamang
Best Actor	Best Actress
**John Lloyd Cruz — Miss You Like Crazy**; Dennis Trillo — Rosario; Ramon 'Bong' Revilla Jr. — Si Agimat at si Enteng Kabisote; Tirso Cruz III — Sigwa; Vic Sotto — Si Agimat at si Enteng Kabisote; Coco Martin — Noy	**Ai-Ai de las Alas — Ang Tanging Ina Mo: Last Na 'To!**; Dawn Zulueta — Sigwa; Bea Alonzo — Miss You Like Crazy; Lorna Tolentino — Sa 'yo Lamang; Jennylyn Mercado — Rosario
Best Supporting Actor	Best Supporting Actress
**Allen Dizon — Sigwa**; Baron Geisler — Noy; Carlo Aquino — Ang Tanging Ina Mo: Last Na 'To!; Sid Lucero — Rosario; Jaime Fabregas — Here Comes the Bride	**Eugene Domingo — Here Comes the Bride**; Zsa Zsa Padilla — Sigwa; Eugene Domingo — Ang Tanging Ina Mo: Last Na 'To!; Gina Pareño — Dalaw; Shaina Magdayao — Sa 'yo Lamang
Best Child Actor	Best Child Actress
**Maliksi Morales — Dalaw**; Timothy Chan — Here Comes the Bride	**Xyriel Manabat — Ang Tanging Ina Mo: Last Na 'To!**; Cheska Billiones — Noy; Dessa Rizalina Fernandez Ilagan — Sigwa; Jillian Ward — Si Agimat at si Enteng Kabisote
Best Screenplay	Best Cinematography
**Bonifacio Ilagan — Sigwa**; Juan Miguel Sevilla, Vanessa R. Valdez, Tey Clamor — Miss You Like Crazy; Mel Mendoza-Del Rosario — Ang Tanging Ina Mo: Last Na 'To!; Elmer L. Gatchalian — Rosario; Ralph Jacinto Quiblat, Ricardo Lee, Karen Ramos — Sa 'yo Lamang	**Carlo Mendoza — Rosario**; Timmy Jimenez — Noy; Lee Meily — Sa 'yo Lamang; Monino Duque — Sigwa; Manuel Teehankee — Miss You Like Crazy; Anne Monzon — Dalaw
Best Art Direction	Best Sound
**Joey Luna — Rosario**; Jesse Bueno, Ruben Arthur Nicdao — Si Agimat at si Enteng Kabisote; Glen Herbert Adriano — Noy; Raymond Bajarias — Dalaw; Edgar Martin Littaua — Sigwa	**Addiss Tabong, Albert Michael Idioma — Si Agimat at si Enteng Kabisote**; Ross Diaz — Noy; Richard Hocks, Warren Santiago — Rosario; Albert Michael Idioma — Dalaw; Alfredo Ongleo — Sigwa
Best Editing	Best Special Effects
**Marya Ignacio — Miss You Like Crazy**; Renewin Alano — Dalaw; Marya Ignacio — My Amnesia Girl; Chrisel Galeno-Desuasido — Si Agimat at si Enteng Kabisote; John Anthony L. Wong — Rosario; Efren Jarlego — Sa 'yo Lamang	**Dekdek Torrente, Erick Torrente — Si Agimat at si Enteng Kabisote**; Chie Torrente, Benny Batoctoy — Dalaw; Dekdek Torrente, Erick Torrente — Rosario; Sa 'yo Lamang; Noy
Best Visual Effects	Best Story
**Kim Erik Samson, Melvyn M. Quimosing, Jay Santiago — Si Agimat at si Enteng Kabisote**; Tessa Cam Rowe, Relie Hinojosa — Rosario; Marites Mendoza, Aldo Aguilar — Noy; Earl Bontuyan, Dodge Ledesma — Dalaw; Elmer Buencamino, Arturo Jarlego — Sa 'yo Lamang	**Joel Lamangan, Bonifacio Ilagan — Sigwa**; Karen Ramos, Ricardo Lee, Ralph Jacinto Quiblat, John Paul Abellera, Mia Louise C. Ramos — Sa 'yo Lamang; Mel Mendoza-Del Rosario — Ang Tanging Ina Mo: Last Na 'To!; Manuel V. Pangilinan — Rosario; Vanessa R. Valdez — Miss You Like Crazy
Best Theme Song	Best Musical Score
**"Miss You Like Crazy" — Miss You Like Crazy (Erik Santos)**; "Sa 'Yo Lamang" — Sa 'yo Lamang (Juris Fernandez); "Lukso Ng Dugo" — Sigwa (Dessa Ilagan and Ayen Laurel); "Habambuhay" — Ang Tanging Ina Mo: Last Na 'To! (Yeng Constantino); "Ang Buhay Nga Naman" — Noy (Noel Cabangon)	**Jessie Lasaten — Si Agimat at si Enteng Kabisote**; Francis Concio — Dalaw; Albert Chang — Rosario; Carmina Cuya — Noy; Lucien Letaba — Sigwa

=== Special awards ===
- **FAMAS Lifetime Achievement Award**
  - **Nora Aunor**
- **German Moreno Youth Achievement Award**
  - Sam Concepcion
  - Kathryn Bernardo
  - Sarah Lahbati
  - Alden Richards
  - Julia Montes
  - Louise delos Reyes
