= List of 2010 box office number-one films in the Philippines =

This is a list of films which placed number one at the weekend box office for the year 2010 in the Philippines.

== Number-one films ==
My Amnesia Girl became the highest grossing film of 2010 despite never reaching #1.

#	Date	Film	Gross (Dollars)	Gross (Peso)	Notes
1	January 3, 2010	Avatar	$203,086	₱9,390,697	It was Avatar third week at number one.
2	January 10, 2010	Avatar	$684,360	₱31,234,190	
3	January 17, 2010	Avatar	$690,169	₱30,931,304	
4	January 24, 2010	Avatar	$521,796	₱24,133,065	
5	January 31, 2010	Paano Na Kaya*	$890,381	₱41,410,374	
6	February 7, 2010	Paano Na Kaya*	$386,018	₱17,850,244	
7	February 14, 2010	Percy Jackson & the Olympians: The Lightning Thief	$669,572	₱31,034,662	
8	February 21, 2010	Percy Jackson & the Olympians: The Lightning Thief	$528,815	₱23,896,198	
9	February 28, 2010	Miss You Like Crazy*	$1,503,324	₱67,563,139	
10	March 7, 2010	Alice in Wonderland	$1,039,374	₱46,803,011	
11	March 14, 2010	Alice in Wonderland	$743,584	₱33,959,481	
12	March 21, 2010	Alice in Wonderland	$409,797	₱18,658,057	
13	March 28, 2010	How to Train Your Dragon	$380,628	₱17,274,802	How to Train Your Dragon reached the #1 spot in its second weekend of release.
14	April 4, 2010	Clash of the Titans	$1,052,679	₱47,275,814	
15	April 11, 2010	Clash of the Titans	$1,424,923	₱63,665,560	
16	April 18, 2010	Clash of the Titans	$645,684	₱28,500,879	
17	May 2, 2010	Iron Man 2	$2,353,617		
18	May 2, 2010	Iron Man 2	$2,353,617	₱104,391,387	
19	May 9, 2010	Iron Man 2	$1,602,405	₱71,671,249	
20	May 16, 2010	Here Comes the Bride*	$931,962	₱42,059,445	
21	May 23, 2010	Shrek Forever After	$1,274,851	₱59,382,560	
22	May 30, 2010	Prince of Persia: The Sands of Time	$1,360,993	₱63,024,319	
23	June 6, 2010	Prince of Persia: The Sands of Time	$840,662	₱39,087,588	
24	June 13, 2010	The Karate Kid	$952,208	₱44,182,451	
25	June 20, 2010	Toy Story 3	$1,197,260	₱54,755,489	
26	June 27, 2010	Toy Story 3	$978,483	₱45,091,432	
27	July 4, 2010	The Twilight Saga: Eclipse	$3,820,998	₱173,021,285	The Twilight Saga: Eclipse had the highest weekend debut of 2010.
28	July 11, 2010	The Twilight Saga: Eclipse	$1,135,972	₱52,342,863	
29	July 18, 2010	The Sorcerer's Apprentice	$847,816	₱38,519,587	
30	July 25, 2010	The Last Airbender	$1,229,252	₱56,121,623	
31	August 1, 2010	Salt	$1,283,189	₱58,295,276	
32	August 8, 2010	Salt	$679,008	₱30,330,608	
33	August 15, 2010	The Expendables	$490,066	₱22,160,785	
34	August 22, 2010	In Your Eyes*	$743,930	₱33,502,888	
35	August 29, 2010	In Your Eyes*	$276,578	₱12,420,841	
36	September 5, 2010	Despicable Me	$849,477	₱37,636,163	
37	September 12, 2010	Despicable Me	$701,993	₱30,895,414	
38	September 19, 2010	Resident Evil: Afterlife	$502,472	₱21,763,871	Resident Evil: Afterlife reached the #1 spot in its second weekend of release.
39	September 26, 2010	Legend of the Guardians: The Owls of Ga'Hoole	$21,186,198	₱47,974,329	
40	October 3, 2010	Legend of the Guardians: The Owls of Ga'Hoole	$423,515	₱18,477,959	
41	October 10, 2010	Eat Pray Love	$249,844	₱10,710,787	Eat Pray Love had the lowest weekend debut of 2010.
42	October 17, 2010	Petrang Kabayo*	$1,231,752	₱53,240,879	
43	October 24, 2010	Petrang Kabayo*	$476,734	₱20,532,933	
44	October 31, 2010	Till My Heartaches End*	$770,985	₱33,022,367	
45	November 7, 2010	Megamind	$499,570	₱21,243,015	
46	November 14, 2010	Megamind	$388,522	₱16,964,813	
47	November 21, 2010	Harry Potter and the Deathly Hallows (Part 1)	$2,381,547	₱103,883,080	
48	November 28, 2010	Harry Potter and the Deathly Hallows (Part 1)	$1,063,843	₱46,914,944	
49	December 12, 2010	Takers (reissue)	$3,842		
50	December 19, 2010	The Chronicles of Narnia: The Voyage of the Dawn Treader	$526,283	₱23,209,607	
51	December 26, 2010	Tron: Legacy	$389,344	₱17,146,710	Tron: Legacy reached the #1 spot in its second weekend of release.
52	Dec 29-Jan 2, 2011	Tron: Legacy	$89,434		

*means of Philippine origin.
