= Super Inday and the Golden Bibe (2010 film) =

- Theatrical movie poster
- Directed by: Mike Tuviera
- Screenplay by: Aloy Adlawan
- Based on: Super Inday and the Golden Bibe (1988) by Luciano B. Carlos
- Produced by: Lily Monteverde; Roselle Monteverde-Teo
- Starring: Marian Rivera; John Lapus; Jake Cuenca; Pokwang
- Cinematography: Mo Zee
- Edited by: Jay Halili
- Music by: Alfred 'Dodoy' Ongleo
- Production companies: Regal Entertainment; Regal Multimedia
- Distributed by: GMA Pictures Inc.
- Release date: December 25, 2010
- Running time: 124 minutes
- Country: Philippines
- Language: Filipino

Super Inday and the Golden Bibe (lit. 'Super Missy and the Golden Duck') is a 2010 superhero fantasy-comedy film film directed by Mike Tuviera and starring Marian Rivera as Super Inday and John Lapus as the Golden Bibe. Produced by Regal Entertainment and Regal Multimedia, Inc and distributed by GMA Pictures. The film is a remake of the 1988 film starring Maricel Soriano and Ice Seguerra (Note: Seguerra came out as a transgender man in 2014 and is now known as Ice Seguerra.) an official entry to 36th Metro Manila Film Festival and was released on December 25, 2010.

== Plot ==
Inday is a simple and innocent provincial girl with a loving mother. A fallen angel named Goldy that can transform into a duck meets a tiyanak that was lost on her way to heaven, but he refuses for he cannot go to heaven until he gets a person to do good and rewards him salvation. Then they meet Inday. The meeting was suddenly interrupted by her neighbor to tell her that her mother is dying.

She goes to the house, just as her mother reveals the painful truth, that she was just adopted by her after her real mother abandoned her in the woman's possession and that her real parents are on Manila and dies after that. Goldy, desperately decided that she can inherit his powers and she needs only to meet his conditions and criteria. As a trick, they hitchhike along with her, disguised as a mother and daughter that will find a way to Manila. The tiyanak carries her burial casket along and they disappeared just as the bus stops at Manila. As an innocent province-grown woman with no experience at work, she applies to work for a rich family, as a maid. The man is a business man, the children are just spoiled and the wife has a secret.

Goldy and the tiyanak try to help her secretly by giving her Goldy's golden eggs, that contain fragments of Goldy's power. The wife's youthful secret is when she sacrifices a child to demons, she receives immortality and youthful appearance in exchange. However, she needs to sacrifice more children to maintain her youth. So she raises an army to do her bidding, until the demons requested to kill her husband's descendants. As the demonic army tried to abduct the children, Inday (with Goldy's help), repels the attackers, but was framed and fired by the woman for her actions.

Heartbroken, she sets off to find clues of what her real mother looks like, until she found her in a market. She tracks her and rents a room nearby and lives their daily lives by selling eggs painted gold and scavenging for recyclables, until she has enough courage to confront her. The mother told the truth and introduces her to her father. Kokang, suspicious of what's happening, stalks her employer and finds out about the secret, but is caught by the latter and hypnotized.

The demons continue to attack and abduct children as sacrifices, until Amazing Jay got entangled in the mess. Inday tries and successfully repels the attack. She and Jay try to investigate, until they found Kokang, under the spell. She dispels it and runs away from the demons. She tried to transform into Super Inday, but Kokang ate the real egg containing Goldy’s power, transforming her into Copycat. With enough power, Inday, Jay and Copycat duel with Ingrid and her demonic minions. Defeating her and driving her to die in the altar.

Few days later, Goldy and the tiyanak (later named Angelika) got their ticket to ascend to heaven. During a party, a crab monster with a human overlord appears in a pond. Inday and Jay appear and fight the monster as Goldy and Angelika ascend to Heaven.

== Cast ==
- Marian Rivera as Inday/Super Inday
- Jake Cuenca as Jeffrey/Amazing J
  - Kenjie Anonuevo as Young Jeffrey
- John Lapus as the Golden Bibe
- Pokwang as Kokay/Copycat
- Jestoni Alarcon as Danny
- Cherry Pie Picache as Monina
- Mylene Dizon as Ingrid
- Buboy Villar as Etnok
- Sabrina Man as Jingky
- Jairus Aquino as Daniel Jr.
- Elijah Alejo as Nameless Girl
- Sheena Halili as Tonette
- Irma Adlawan as Lucita

== Reception ==
=== Box office performance ===
Super Inday and the Golden Bibe reportedly grossed ₱3.1 million at the Philippine box office within its first two days.

=== Critical response ===
Philippine Entertainment Portal complained that while Super Inday was still the same as in the original film, the character of the golden bibe had changed considerably. While calling the film "respectable" and "a genuine superhero movie" that doesn't try to be something else, they found it overlong and not saying anything of importance. In contrast Click The City called the movie "awful" claiming it unsuccessfully tried to appeal to everyone by cramming in far too much, and scoring it 1.5/5.

== Accolades ==
=== Awards and nominations ===
Year	Award Giving Body	Category	Recipient	Result
2010	Metro Manila Film Festival	Best Actress	Marian Rivera	Nominated
2010	Metro Manila Film Festival	Best Make-up Artist	Nestor Dayao, et al.	Nominated
2010	Metro Manila Film Festival	Best Sound Engineering (tied with RPG Metanoia)	Ditoy Aguila	Won
