= Artex Compound =

Permanently flooded village in Malabon, Philippines

Coordinates: 14.6853°N 120.9528°E

- Residential Area
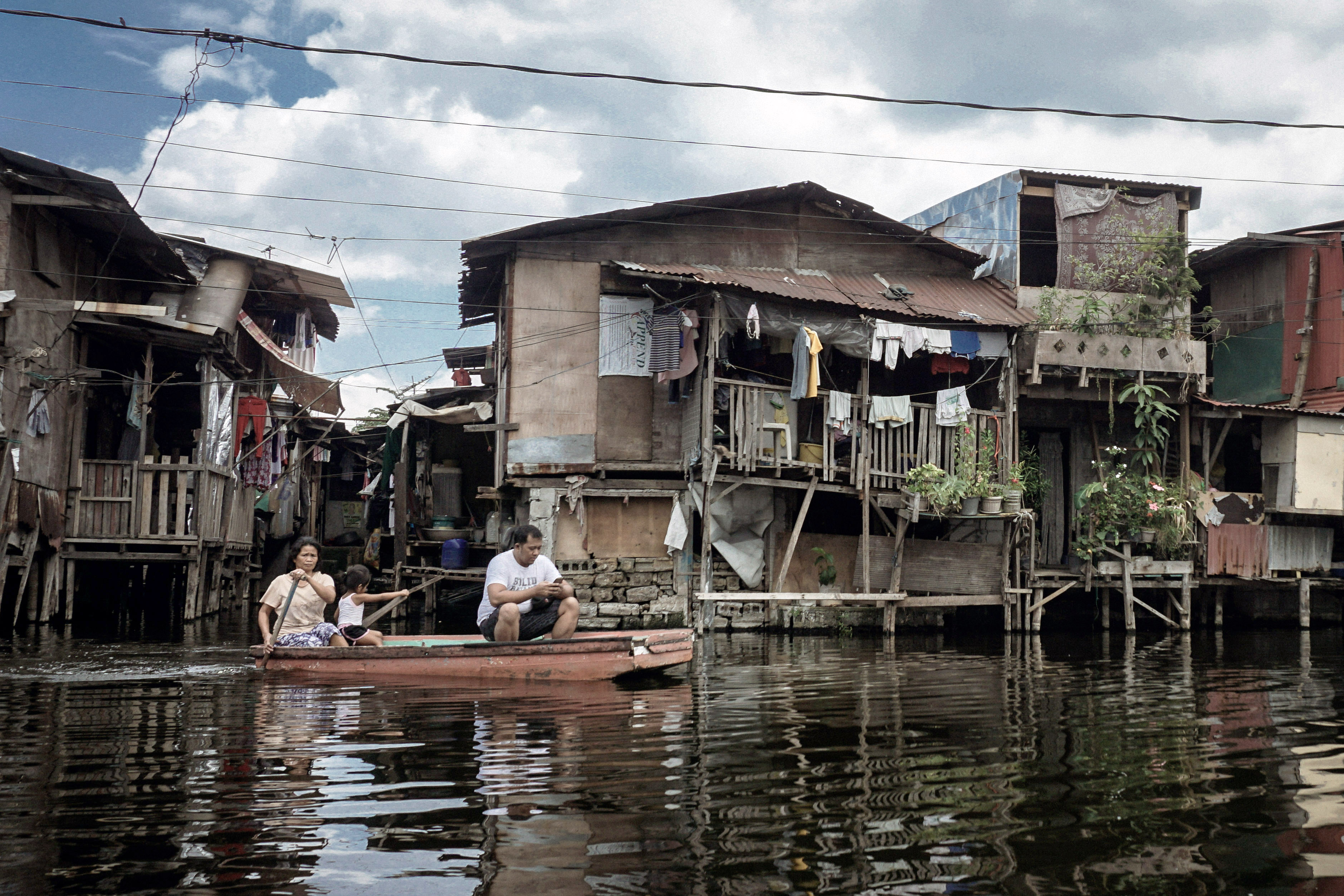
- A family rows across the flooded 'streets' of Artex Compound
- Interactive map of Artex Compound
- Country: Philippines
- Region: National Capital Region
- City: Malabon
- Barangay: Panghulo
- Established: 1970s
- Named for: Artex Development Co., Inc.

Area
  - Total: 8.5 ha (21 acres)

Population
  - Estimate (2019): 200−250 families
- Time zone: UTC+8 (PST)

The Artex Compound is a permanently flooded residential area in Malabon, Philippines. Nicknamed the "Venice of Malabon", the compound is known for its partially submerged structures, makeshift stilt houses, and the use of rowboats for transportation between houses.

Originally developed as housing for workers of a nearby textile mill, around 200 to 250 families continue to reside in the compound which has remained inundated since 2004. The compound has been the center of a long-running labor and ownership dispute between the residents and the former owners of the textile mill. It has since become an alternative tourism site frequented by street photographers, students, researchers, journalists, documentarists, and filmmakers due to its unique landscape and social history.

== History ==
Located in Barangay Panghulo, the Artex Compound was originally a rent-free housing project built for employees of the Artex Development Co., Inc., a textile and thread manufacturing company that began operations in the 1960s. (Note: In several news and feature articles about Artex Compound, the company is erroneously referred to as "Artex Yupangco Textile Mills Corporation." However, Supreme Court records show that a company by that name never existed, and is most likely a result of interviewed residents misremembering or conflating the names Artex Development Corporation and Yupangco Cotton Mills.) At its peak, the factory employed around 1,200 workers, most of whom lived in the compound, with some for more than three decades. Artex was owned by the Typoco family, who were cronies of President Ferdinand Marcos.

In 1984, the workers of Artex under the Samahan ng mga Manggagawa sa Artex (Artex Workers Union) or SAMAR went on strike to protest the inhumane working conditions, low wages, and lack of benefits such as 13th month pay, vacation leaves and sick leaves. The workers were only paid ₱44 per day which was only half of the ₱89 minimum wage prescribed by law at the time. In response, the management of Artex claimed that the free housing (including free water and electricity) compensated for the low wages the workers were earning. The Artex workers were joined by student-activists and by workers of the nearby Foamtex factory who were also on strike.

On July 9, 1984, police attempted to enforce an order by the Ministry of Labor to lift the picket lines, but were met with rocks and darts thrown by the 200 striking workers. When one of the policemen was attacked, a backup platoon of government forces opened fire with rifles and pistols. According to Malabon police chief Col. Alfredo Cruz, two workers were killed, 27 were wounded, and 10 police officers were injured. Most of the injured workers refused medical treatment, fearing that police will arrest them. Despite the violent dispersal, the workers refused to leave the compound unless the management met their demands, leading to a standoff that lasted for five years.

In May 1989, Artex ceased operations due to the labor strike and the worsening floods in Malabon. The workers remained within the compound after the company's closure, asserting that they are the rightful owners of the properties.

=== Legal battles ===
On February 1, 1990, the Department of Labor and Employment ruled in favor of the workers and ordered Artex to pay ₱19,824,804 for violation of the minimum wage law and other labor standards. After a series of appeals and motions for reconsideration by Artex, the National Labor Relations Commission (NLRC) issued a final decision favoring the workers in 1994, but reduced the award to ₱9,000,000. On October 6, 1994, an NLRC sheriff along with officers of SAMAR went to the Artex Compound to retrieve machinery, scrap iron, and other materials to be auctioned as payment to the workers, but were prevented from doing so by Artex's private security guards. A break-open order was issued on March 30, 1995, to allow the sheriff and SAMAR to levy Artex's factory machinery.

On May 4, 1995, Yupangco Cotton Mills, Inc., a cotton mill based in Angono, Rizal, filed a third party claim with the NLRC claiming that they had already bought the Artex factory, its machines and the premises in 1989 and thus were its rightful owners. The workers protested, claiming that both Artex and Yupangco were owned by the Tanyu-Typoco group of companies. Yupangco however vehemently denied the accusations, claiming that they are an uninvolved third party. The Malabon Municipal Assessor issued a certification declaring the Artex Compound had been transferred to Yupangco since 1991. Yupangco also filed robbery charges in 1996 against the NLRC sheriff, SAMAR and the buyers of the machinery, effectively stopping their sale and stalling the ₱9,000,000 judgment award to the workers.

In a 1997 decision, Labor Arbiter Jovencio Mayor declared that Yupangco Cotton Mills "has become the absolute owner and possessor" of the properties in the Artex Compound since May 1989 and that Yupangco's third party claim was legal and valid.

In 2005, a Supreme Court decision upheld Yupangco's third party claim of the property, but dismissed the robbery charges as "baseless." Thus, the Artex Compound is still legally considered private property which has prevented the local government from freely intervening in the issue, although the courts can issue an order for the premises to be vacated at anytime.

== Permanent flooding ==
Malabon is one of the most frequently flooded cities in Metro Manila due to its low-lying flat terrain and its close proximity to the Tullahan River and Manila Bay. Artex Compound sits on one of the lowest-lying portions of the city, with its southern perimeter bordered by fishponds from the nearby Karisma fishing enterprise. The compound itself became a permanent catch basin for rainwater when the roads surrounding the neighborhood were elevated as a result of Malabon's rapid urbanization. The conversion of the nearby fishponds into relocation sites for informal settlers and upscale gated subdivisions further exacerbated the flooding. According to residents, they used to have a diesel-powered water pump that they operated three times a day to keep the water out during the rainy season, but they decided to stop using the pump when the residents could no longer shoulder the cost of fuel.

Prior to the flood, the compound had a basketball court, a volleyball court, a playground, a community chapel, and pine trees.

In 2004, the housing compound was permanently flooded when heavy rains combined with the collapse of a perimeter wall separating the compound and the adjacent fishponds caused floodwater to inundate the entire compound in 5 feet (1.5 m) deep floods that never receded. Depending on the tides and the amount of rainfall, the water can rise as high as 10 feet (3.0 m) deep within the compound. Initially, efforts were made by the residents to pump the water out of the compound, which proved in vain as the water had nowhere else to drain and simply flowed back to the compound.

=== Adapting to the flood ===
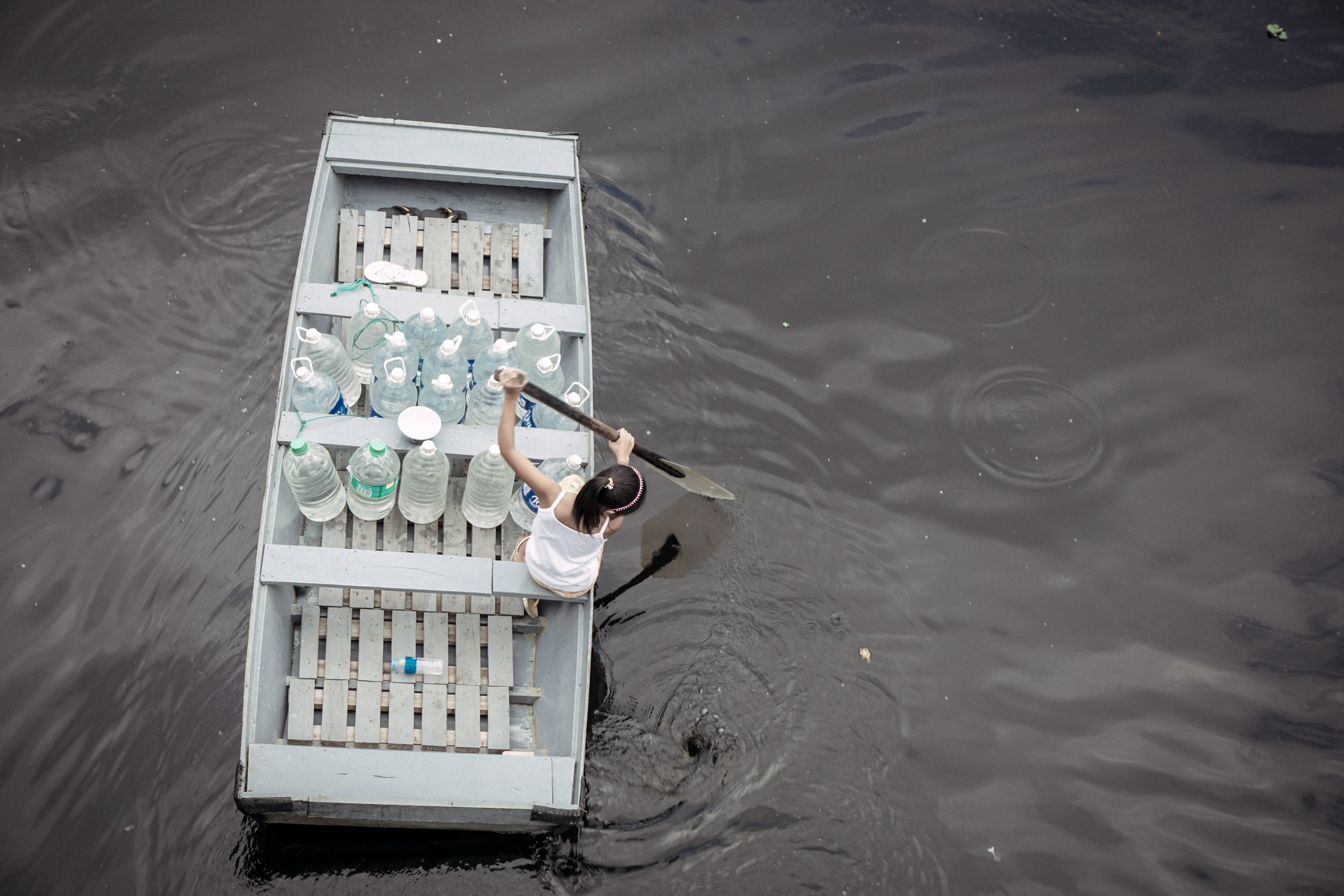
A young girl rows a boat carrying several gallons of water back to her house.

The residents have since adapted to the flooding as a way of life. Those that lived in two-storey houses simply moved upstairs while the old, submerged houses (called silong) had new stilt houses built on top of them. Most of the houses have electrical, telephone, and cable TV connections. However, none of the houses have indoor plumbing. Instead, residents row everyday to a faucet located at the compound's gate to refill plastic containers with water for bathing, washing dishes, and doing laundry at home. Residents purchase purified drinking water from water refilling stations located near the compound.

Many residents earn a meager living working as boat rowers, earning approximately ₱200 per day. Most of the rowers are women, since the men usually work elsewhere in the city while the children study in the nearby schools. Families that could not afford proper boats instead use makeshift rafts made with polystyrene foam, wooden planks, plastic containers, and other buoyant materials. Sari-sari stores inside the compound use baskets attached to ropes and pulleys to transact with customers. During the Christmas holidays, the residents organize annual boat racing competitions within the compound.

== Issues ==
=== Relocation ===
Despite the flooding, most of the residents still refuse to live elsewhere for various reasons. Because most of the residents are family members of former Artex workers, the residents are still demanding the separation pay, back pay and benefits owed to them by the corporation. By moving elsewhere, the residents fear they would also relinquish their right to ownership of the properties. A banner that reads "We Are Still on Strike!" is still visible at the entrance to the compound.

Offers to voluntarily relocate have been made by the city government of Malabon, however most of the residents that lived outside the compound ended up returning to Artex Compound after briefly staying outside.

On May 28, 2013, a large fire broke out in a housing complex inside the compound, killing one resident. Many of the victims of the fire chose to rebuild new houses on stilts rather than seek residence elsewhere in the city.

=== Health and safety risks ===
Although fish such as tilapia can be found in the water, the residents do not eat them as they are aware that the water is contaminated by refuse and sewage from the nearby houses, restaurants, and wet markets. Because the houses have no access to sewerage and proper solid waste management, urine and feces are simply disposed of directly in the water. On certain days, the strong stench of sewage from the water is said to be so foul that even long-time residents find it difficult to sleep.

A study conducted by the Department of Environmental Engineering of the University of the Philippines Diliman found that the compound's water has high levels of bacteria attributable to human and animal fecal matter.

In a 2015 interview with ABS-CBN, Dr. Rey Salinel warned that Artex Compound residents who are frequently exposed to the floodwaters are at a greater risk of contracting respiratory tract infections, mosquito-borne illnesses such as dengue and malaria, skin and fungal infections, leptospirosis, gastroenteritis, diarrhea, typhoid, amoebiasis, dysentery, and various other diseases.

In January 2017, an 11-year-old boy from Barangay Panghulo drowned while swimming in the floodwaters of Artex Compound.

== In popular culture ==
The 2009 French-Filipino film Grandmother directed by Brillante Mendoza takes place in Sitio Ilog, a fictionalized version of Artex Compound where most of the film was shot on location.

In the 2010 independent film Noy, the protagonist (played by Coco Martin) is a resident of Artex Compound.

The long-running television series Ang Probinsyano also filmed certain scenes within the compound.

In 2017, KFC ran an advertising campaign wherein an amphibious vehicle was used to "deliver" buckets of fried chicken to a 69-year-old birthday celebrant as well as other elderly residents of Artex Compound.
