= Machete (TV series) =

2011 Philippine television drama series

- Title card
- Genre: Fantasy drama
- Based on: Machete (1990) by Pablo S. Gomez
- Written by: Renato Custodio Jr.; Denoy Navarro-Dunio; Tina Velasco; Marlon Miguel
- Directed by: Don Michael Perez; Gina Alajar
- Creative director: Jun Lana
- Starring: Aljur Abrenica
- Theme music composer: Jobart Bartolome
- Opening theme: "Ikaw Nga Ba?" by Aljur Abrenica
- Country of origin: Philippines
- Original language: Tagalog
- No. of episodes: 40

Production
- Executive producer: Nieva M. Sabit
- Editors: Benedict Lavastida; Robert Reyes; Eddie Esmedia
- Camera setup: Multiple-camera setup
- Running time: 30–45 minutes
- Production company: GMA Entertainment TV

Original release
- Network: GMA Network
- Release: January 24 – March 18, 2011

Machete is a 2011 Philippine television drama fantasy series broadcast by GMA Network. The series is based on a Philippine fictional character of the same name by Pablo S. Gomez. Directed by Don Michael Perez and Gina Alajar, it stars Aljur Abrenica in the title role. It premiered on January 24, 2011 on the network's Telebabad line up. The series concluded on March 18, 2011, with a total of 40 episodes.

== Cast and characters ==
Cast

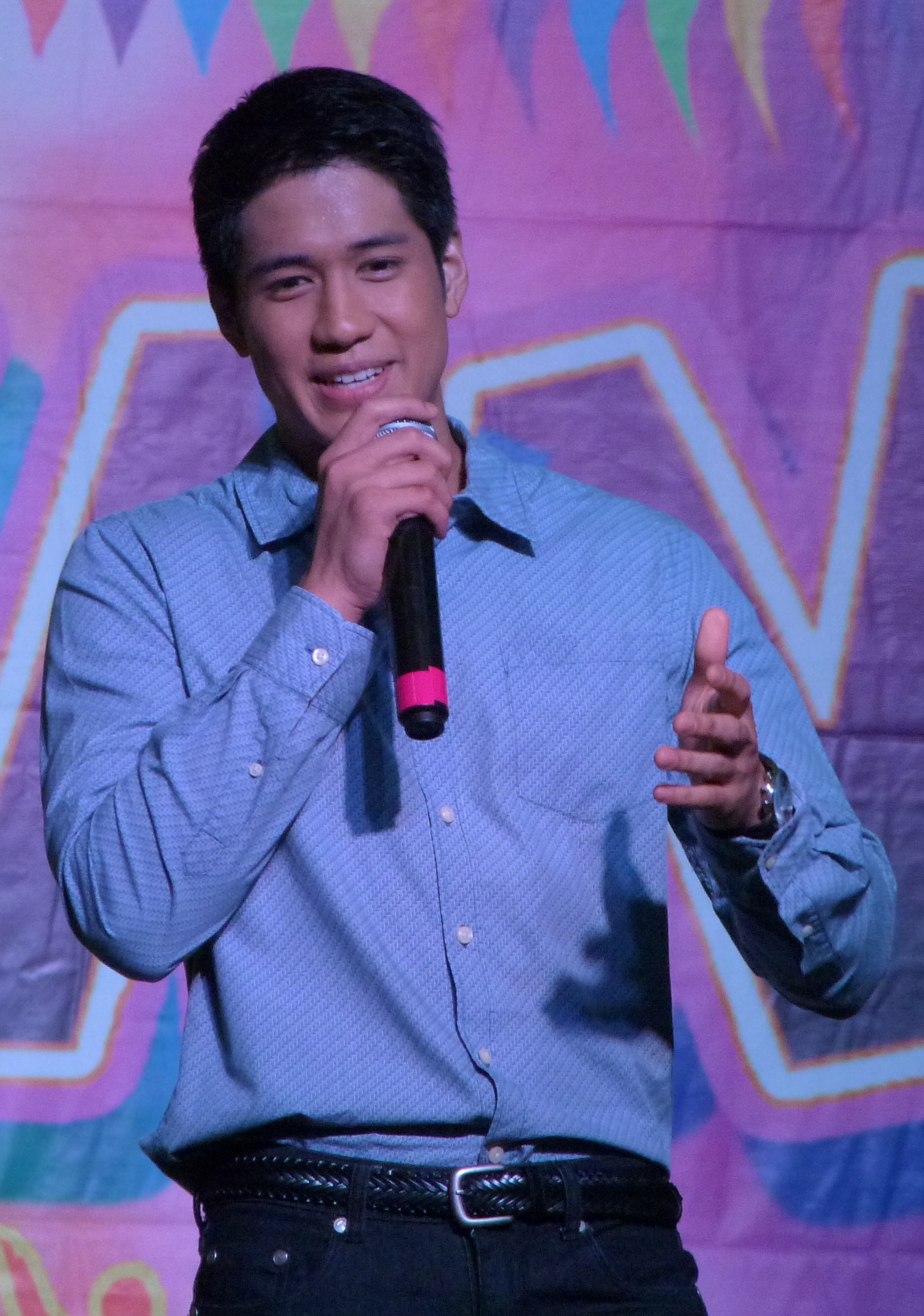
Aljur Abrenica

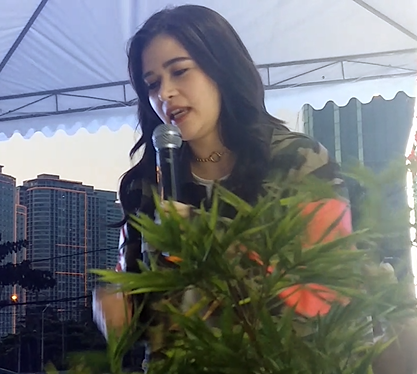
Bela Padilla

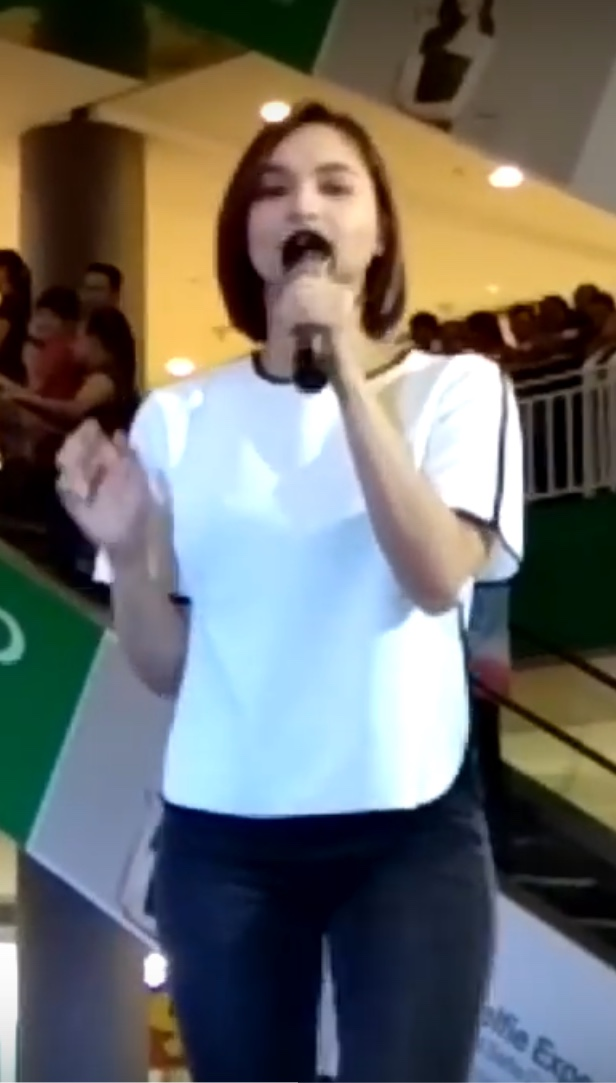
Ryza Cenon

Lead cast

- Aljur Abrenica as Machete / Dakila Romero

Supporting cast

- Bela Padilla as Aginaya / Rosella
- Ryza Cenon as Marla Lucero / fake Aginaya / Bugana
- Ryan Eigenmann as Karum
- Polo Ravales as Zander
- Chariz Solomon as Candy de Jesus
- Anita Linda as older Aginaya
- Zoren Legaspi as Malyari
- John Arcilla as Alfonso
- Gina Alajar as Elena
- Rio Locsin as Divina Lucero
- Nonie Buencamino as Carlos
- Karen delos Reyes as Bugana
- Rocky Gutierrez as Lucco
- Gwen Zamora as Serena Johns
- Stephanie Henares as Valerie Santillan

Guest cast

- Daniella Amable as younger Rosella
- Sheena Lorenzo as younger Marla
- Chef Philipps as Edward John
- Carmina Villarroel as Linda Ledesma
- Joyce Ching as Dessa Ledesma
- Paolo Contis as Homer
- Robert Villar as Val Ledesma
- Daniel Matsunaga as Baal
- Kris Bernal as Jessa Ledesma / Jessa Romero

== Production ==
Principal photography commenced on December 28, 2010.

== Ratings ==
According to AGB Nielsen Philippines' Mega Manila People/Individual television ratings, the pilot episode of Machete earned a 12.8% rating. The final episode scored a 13.2% rating.
