= 2010 Metro Manila Film Festival =

Annual Philippine Festival edition

2010 Metro Manila Film Festival 36th Metro Manila Film Festival
- Awards: Gabi ng Parangal (lit. 'Awards Night')
- No. of films: 8
- Festival date: December 25, 2010 to January 7, 2011

MMFF chronology
- 37th ed. 35th ed.

The 36th Metro Manila Film Festival - Philippines (MMFF) is the 36th edition of the annual film festival in Manila, held from December 25, 2010 until January 7, 2011. The Awards Night (known as "Gabi ng Parangal") was held on December 26, 2010. During the festival, no foreign films are shown in Philippine theaters in order to showcase the locally produced films especially meant for the festival.

Star Cinema's Ang Tanging Ina Mo (Last na 'To!) topped the festival, winning nine awards including the Best Picture, Best Actress for Ai-Ai delas Alas, Best Supporting Actress for Eugene Domingo, Best Director for Wenn Deramas, Best Child Performer for Xyriel Manabat, and the Most Gender-Sensitive Film Award among others.

Philippine's first foray into CGI animated feature RPG Metanoia became the second at the festival, receiving four awards (including a runner-up): Third Best Picture, Best Sound Engineering, Best Original Theme Song and Most Gender-Sensitive Film Award as a special citation of animation; its four awards jointly ties with Dayo: Sa Mundo ng Elementalia.

Philippine "Comedy King" Dolphy, meanwhile, took the Best Actor and Metro Manila Film Festival Award for Best Supporting Actor trophies for his roles in two separate movies, Father Jejemon and Rosario respectively.

Cinemabuhay and Studio 5's Rosario got seven awards including the Second Best Picture and the Gatpuno Antonio J. Villegas Cultural Awards, among others.

== Changes from previous years ==
The November 28, 2010 Entertainment Column in Manila Bulletin, written by Crispina Martinez-Belen, announced changes for the 2010 film festival.

First, the commercial viability criterion (box-office performance of the entries) was removed. As of 2010, the criteria for the selection of Best Picture(s) were: artistry; creativity and technical excellence; innovation; and thematic value. Entries were also judged for global appeal (70 percent) and Filipino cultural and/or historical value (30 percent).

Another change in the 2010 festival format was a tribute to independent films with the screening of five indie films during the week preceding the festival. These films included Senior Year by Jerrold Tarog; Nasaan si Hefte by Jonnah Lim; Presa by Adolf Alix Jr.; Slow Fade by Rommel Sales; and Rindido by Noriel Jarito.

In addition, the established board of jurors was expanded to include housewives, drivers, students, teachers, etc.

Lastly, the festival logo was also changed to feature a map of the metropolis of Manila, based on the old seal of the Metropolitan Manila Development Authority with seventeen stars on it symbolizing the seventeen cities and municipality of Metro Manila. The logo for the first 35 festivals featured a torch.

== Entries ==
=== Official entries ===
These were the eight mainstream films in the film festival.

Title	Starring	Studio	Director	Genre
Si Agimat at si Enteng Kabisote	Vic Sotto, Bong Revilla, Gwen Zamora, Sam Pinto, Oyo Boy Sotto, Bing Loyzaga, Amy Perez	GMA Films, OctoArts Films, APT Entertainment, M-Zet Productions & Imus Productions	Tony Y. Reyes	Action, Comedy, Fantasy
Dalaw	Kris Aquino, Diether Ocampo, Alessandra de Rossi, Karylle, Empress Schuck, Gina Pareño, Ina Feleo, Susan Africa, Maliksi Morales	CineMedia & Star Cinema	Dondon S. Santos	Suspense, Thriller
Father Jejemon	Dolphy, Maja Salvador, Ejay Falcon, Efren Reyes, Vandolph, Jeffrey Quizon	RVQ Productions Inc.	Frank Grey Jr.	Dramedy
Rosario	Jennylyn Mercado, Dennis Trillo, Yul Servo, Sid Lucero, Isabel Oli, Phillip Salvador, Tonton Gutierrez, Eula Valdez, Liza Lorena, Dolphy	Cinemabuhay & Studio5	Albert Martinez	Drama
RPG Metanoia	Vhong Navarro, Aga Muhlach, Eugene Domingo, Mika Dela Cruz, Zaijian Jaranilla	AmbientMedia & Star Cinema	Luis C. Suarez	Comedy, Fantasy, Adventure
Shake, Rattle and Roll 12	Carla Abellana, Rayver Cruz, Andi Eigenmann, John Lapus, Sid Lucero, Shaina Magdayao	Regal Entertainment Inc. & Regal Multimedia Inc.	Zoren Legaspi, Jerrold Tarog & Topel Lee	Horror
Super Inday and the Golden Bibe	Marian Rivera, John Lapus, Jake Cuenca, Pokwang, Cherry Pie Picache, Jestoni Alarcon, Mylene Dizon, Sheena Halili, Buboy Villar, Sabrina Man, Jairus Aquino, Irma Adlawan, Elijah Alejo	Regal Entertainment	Mike Tuviera	Comedy, Fantasy, Adventure
Ang Tanging Ina Mo (Last na 'To!)	Ai-Ai delas Alas, Eugene Domingo, Marvin Agustin, Carlo Aquino, Shaina Magdayao, Nikki Valdez, Mark Acueza, Yuuki Kadooka, Tonton Gutierrez, Jestoni Alarcon, Dennis Padilla, Serena Dalrymple, Jiro Manio, Alwyn Uytingco, Xyriel Manabat, Empoy Marquez, John Avila, Rafael Rosell IV, Ricci Chan, Andoy Ranay, Cherry Pie Picache	Star Cinema	Wenn V. Deramas	Dramedy

=== Indie films ===
For the first time in the 36 editions of the Metro Manila Film Festival, it paid tribute to the independent filmmakers in the country by featuring five indie films in addition to the eight mainstream movie entries in the MMFF. These films were exhibited from December 16 to 20.

- Rindido - Noriel Jarito
- Presa – Adolfo Alix Jr.
- Nasaan si Hepte? - Jonah Añonuevo Lim
- Slow Fade - Rommel Sales
- Senior Year - Jerrold Tarog

== Awards ==
2010 Metro Manila Film Festival Gabi ng Parangal
- Date: December 26, 2010
- Site: Meralco Theater, Pasig

Highlights
- Best Picture: Ang Tanging Ina Mo (Last na 'To!)
- Most awards: Ang Tanging Ina Mo (Last na 'To!) (9)

Television coverage
- Network: GMA 7

The "Gabi ng Parangal" (Awards Night) was held on December 26, 2010 at the Meralco Theater and it was shown for the first time on GMA Network. Due to its obligation to show the wedding of Ogie Alcasid and Regine Velasquez, the telecast was shown later that night on a delayed basis.

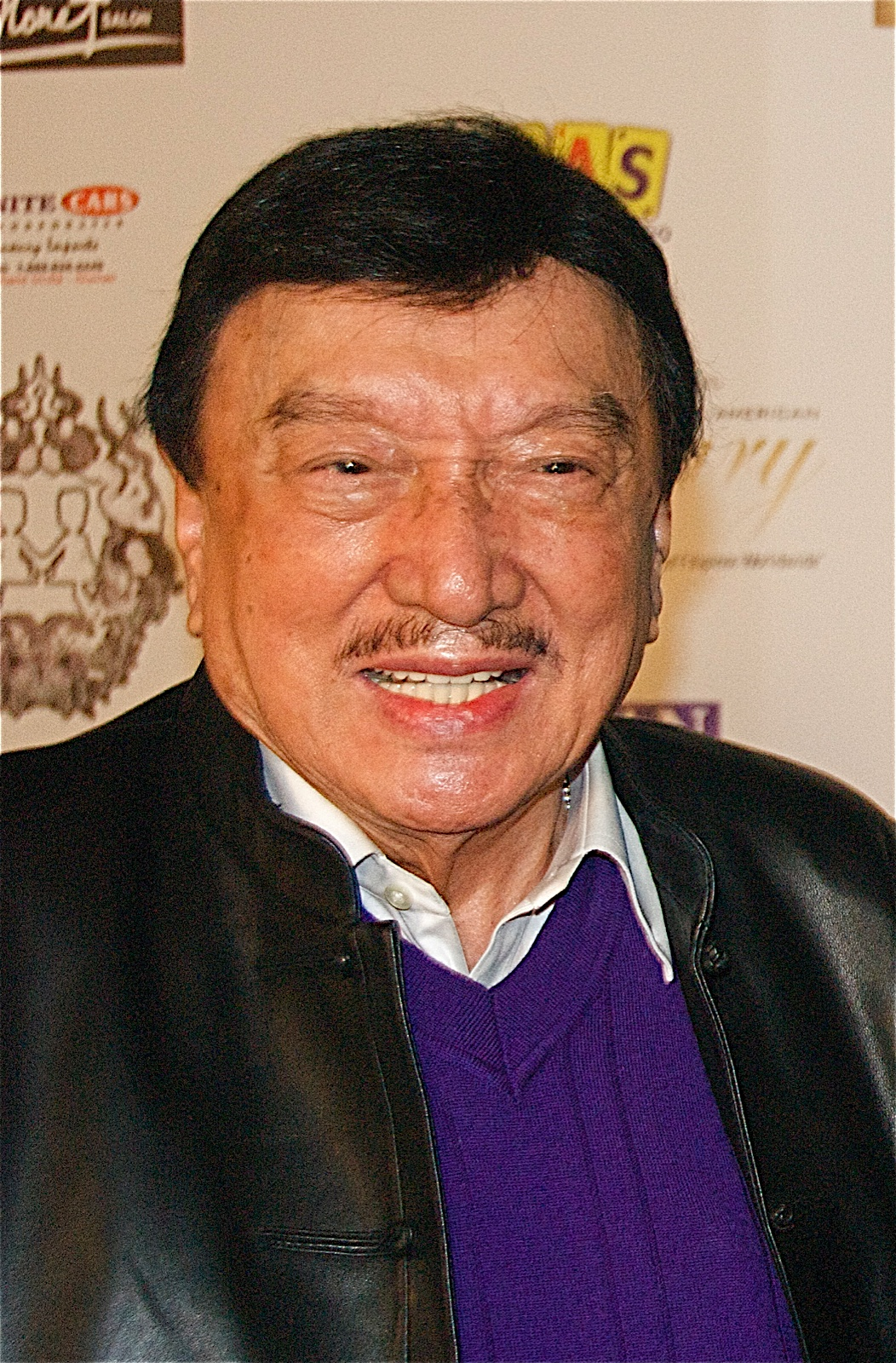
Dolphy, Best Actor and Best Supporting actor winner

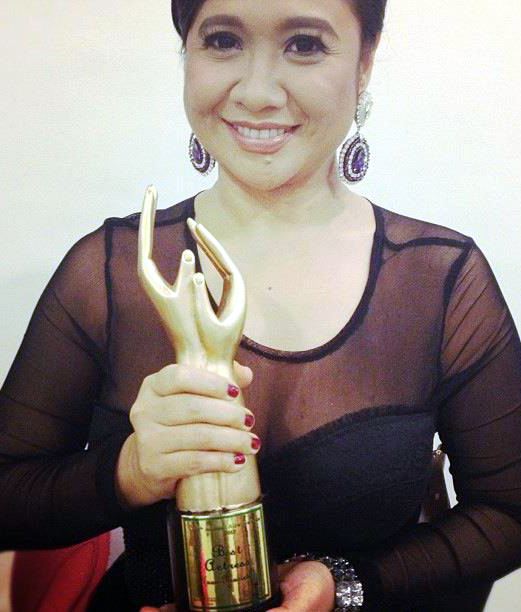
Eugene Domingo, Best Supporting Actress winner

Best Picture	Best Director
Ang Tanging Ina Mo (Last na 'To!) - Star Cinema; Rosario - Cinemabuhay and Studio5 (2nd Best Picture); RPG Metanoia - AmbientMedia and Star Cinema (3rd Best Picture)	Wenn V. Deramas - Ang Tanging Ina Mo (Last na 'To!)
Best Actor	Best Actress
Dolphy - Father Jejemon	Ai-Ai delas Alas - Ang Tanging Ina Mo (Last na 'To!); Carla Abellana - Shake, Rattle and Roll 12: (Punerarya episode); Marian Rivera - Super Inday and the Golden Bibe
Best Supporting Actor	Best Supporting Actress
Dolphy - Rosario	Eugene Domingo - Ang Tanging Ina Mo (Last na 'To!)
Best Cinematography	Best Production Design
Carlo Mendoza - Rosario	Joey Luna - Rosario
Best Child Performer	Best Editing
Xyriel Manabat - Ang Tanging Ina Mo (Last na 'To!)	John Wong - Rosario
Best Original Story	Best Screenplay
Mel del Rosario - Ang Tanging Ina Mo (Last na 'To!)	Mel del Rosario - Ang Tanging Ina Mo (Last na 'To!)
Best Original Theme Song	Best Musical Score
Ria Osorio and Gerard Salonga - ("Kaya Mo" - performed by Protein Shake ft. Ney and Kean Cipriano) - RPG Metanoia	Jessie Lazatin - Ang Tanging Ina Mo (Last na 'To!)
Best Visual Effects	Best Make-up Artist
Rico Gutierrez - Si Agimat at si Enteng Kabisote	Si Agimat at si Enteng Kabisote; Nestor Dayao, et al. - Super Inday and the Golden Bibe
Best Sound Recording	Best Float
Ditoy Aguila - Super Inday and the Golden Bibe and; Ambient Media - RPG Metanoia	Rosario - Cinemabuhay and Studio5
Most Gender-Sensitive Film	Best Indie Film
Ang Tanging Ina Mo (Last na 'To!) - Star Cinema	Presa - Adolf Alix Jr.
Gatpuno Antonio J. Villegas Cultural Awards
Rosario - Cinemabuhay and Studio5

=== Indie Films ===
- Best Indie Film: Presa - Adolf Alix Jr.

== Multiple awards ==
Awards	Film
9	Ang Tanging Ina Mo (Last na 'To!)
7	Rosario
3	RPG Metanoia
2	Si Agimat at si Enteng Kabisote

== Criticisms ==
On December 28, 2010, multi-awarded Filipino blogger "The Professional Heckler" wrote with sarcasm: "Several people are questioning the results of the MMDA-organized Metro Manila Film Festival 'Gabi ng Parangal'. But that's totally unfair. Awards are subjective. Besides, why expect too much from the very same people who run the metro's traffic system?" He added: "(Malacañang) Palace spokesman Atty. Edwin Lacierda headed this year's MMFF board of jurors. Ignoring criticisms, Lacierda insisted that the list of winners was 'fine-tuned' before being made public."

== Box Office gross ==
The Metropolitan Manila Development Authority was criticized for not releasing the official final earnings of the Bottom 3 films.

Entry	Gross Ticket Sales			
Entry	December 25	December 26	December 27	January 7
Si Agimat at si Enteng Kabisote	₱ 31,000,000*	₱ 56,700,000*	₱ 74,700,000*	₱ 159,000,000*
Ang Tanging Ina Mo (Last na 'To!)	₱ 20,000,000	₱ 37,800,000	₱ 54,300,000	₱ 157,000,000
Dalaw	₱ 12,500,000	₱ 23,800,000	₱ 33,100,000	₱ 96,000,000
Shake, Rattle and Roll 12	₱ 11,800,000	₱ 19,900,000	₱ 25,500,000	₱ 50,000,000
RPG: Metanoia	₱ 5,100,000	₱ 9,900,000	₱ 13,400,000	₱ 28,000,000
Super Inday and the Golden Bibe	₱ 4,700,000	₱ 7,800,000	₱ 10,000,000	–
Rosario	₱ 3,200,000	₱ 5,500,000	₱ 7,600,000	–
Father Jejemon	₱ 1,400,000	₱ 2,400,000	₱ 3,200,000	–
			TOTAL	₱ 530,000,000

Preceded by 2009 Metro Manila Film Festival	Metro Manila Film Festival; 2010	Succeeded by 2011 Metro Manila Film Festival
