= Joseph Laban =

Filipino film and television director (c. 1981 – 2021)

Joseph Israel Laban (c. 1981 – July 25, 2021) was a Filipino journalist, independent filmmaker, playwright, and a Fulbright Scholar.

== Education ==
Laban obtained his bachelor's degree in creative writing from the University of the Philippines at Diliman. He also attended New York University on a Fulbright Scholarship for his master's degree in Journalism with a concentration in News and Documentary.

== Career ==
He was the Co-Owner of One Big Fight Productions, a film and television production company. He was also the Founder and Festival Director of the CineTotoo Philippine International Documentary Film Festival, the biggest documentary film festival in the Philippines. In 2014, he was a Fellow of the Jakarta-based DocNet Southeast Asia Producers Strategy Workshop initiated by the Goethe-Institut Indonesien held in Kuala Lumpur, Malaysia. In February 2015, he attended the Berlinale Talents at the Berlin International Film Festival.

He was working as a Managing Producer of GMA News and Public Affairs assigned to such programs as Front Row where he was the Executive Producer, Director and Writer; and Reporter’s Notebook where he worked as Head Writer. He was also the Founder and Festival Director of GMA News TV’s Cine Totoo Philippine International Documentary Film Festival. Aside from his work in television and film, he also contributed to print and online media. He contributed articles and video work to The New York Times and the Philippine Center for Investigative Journalism (PCIJ). He was also a Fellow of the Bangkok-based Southeast Asian Press Alliance in 2007 where he reported on the post-conflict situation in East Timor. In 2008, he contributed to the book “Wrongs Against Rights: Impunity Across Southeast Asia”.

== Films ==
=== Antipo ===
Laban co-produced in 2009 his first commercial short film, Antipo, about a young man who seeks absolution and forgiveness through the ancient tradition of "antipo" or self-flagellation, which was an Official Selection at the 2010 Cannes Film Festival Short Film Corner. He also directed, wrote and produced, Antipo.

=== Cuchera ===
In 2011, Laban directed, wrote and produced “Cuchera”, a film about the plight of Filipino drug mules. It was screened at the Cinemalaya Philippine Independent Film Festival, Toronto International Film Festival - Discovery Section as well as other festivals including Stockholm, Fribourg, Cleveland and Belgrade.

Cuchera was Laban's first feature film. It deals with the grim fate of low-rent drug mules and their recruiters. The film was a Finalist at the 7th Cinemalaya Independent Film Festival and it had its International Premiere at the Discovery Section of the 2011 Toronto International Film Festival (TIFF). It was also screened at the Stockholm International Film Festival (Main Competition), Cleveland International Film Festival, Belgrade International Film Festival and Fribourg International Film Festival.

TIFF film programmer Steve Gravestock described it as "One of the most shocking debuts in recent Filipino cinema... Cuchera may turn out to be a watershed in Filipino film history — directly linking the melodramatic ferocity of the politically charged works of veteran directors like Joel Lamangan and Carlos Siguion-Reyna with the more intimate style of what some have dubbed the Filipino New Wave."

=== Baconaua ===
Baconaua (Sea Serpent) tells the story of young provincial lass Divina as she mulls whether to have her father, who went missing at sea three months ago declared officially dead. It won three major awards at the 13th Cinemalaya Philippine Independent Film Festival: Best Director, Special Jury Prize and Best Screenplay. The film was also a recipient of the prestigious Asian Cinema Fund (ACF) of the Busan International Film Festival.

=== Nuwebe ===
In 2013, he directed, wrote and produced the film “Nuwebe”, also under the Cinemalaya Philippine Independent Film Festival. For his work on this film, he won Best Director at the 2015 ASEAN International Film Festival and Awards in Sarawak, Malaysia.

"Nuwebe" was also nominated for Best Picture and Best Actress. It has been screened at more than fifty international film festivals including Montreal, Vancouver, Geneva and Goteborg. It has won several international awards from the Queens World Film Festival (Best Director), Harlem International Film Festival (Best Actress) in New York City, Lume International Film Festival(Special Mention) in Brazil and Festival Internacional de Cine Puebla (Special Mention) in Mexico.

Nuwebe was Laban's follow up to the film Cuchera. It tells the story of one of the youngest mothers in Philippine history. It initially received mixed reviews from local critics but went on to have a successful run in international film festivals. It was also a finalist at the 2013 Cinemalaya Philippine Independent Film Festival. It has been screened at more than fifty international film festivals. It has won several international awards and nominations from the Queens World Film Festival (Best Director) and Harlem International Film Festival (Best Actress) in New York City, Lume International Film Festival (Special Mention) in Brazil and the Festival Internacional de Cine Puebla (Special Mention) in Mexico.

He won "Best Director" for this film at the 13th Cinemalaya Philippine Independent Film Festival. The film also won the Special Jury Prize and Best Cinematography award. Laban also won the Best Screenplay award at Cinemalaya for his work on the short film "Bawod" directed by Ilonggo filmmaker TM Malones.

=== Other films and productions ===
In 2014, he produced the film Children’s Show directed by then first-time director Roderick Cabrido. The film won the Special Jury Award at Fantasporto: 35th Oporto International Film Festival in Portugal; Special Jury Award, Grand Jury Award for Best Screenplay, and Fantastic Cinema Emerging Filmmaker Award at the Fantastic Cinema Festival of the Film Society of Little Rock in Arkansas, USA; Best Supporting Actor, Best Editing, Best Cinematography and Best Sound at 10th Cinemalaya Philippine Independent Film Festival. In 2016, Laban produced and wrote the film "Purgatoryo" directed by Roderick Cabrido, where he won the Best Screenplay award with co-writer Denise O'Hara at the QCinema International Film Festival. Also in 2016, he co-produced the film "Tuos" again directed by Cabrido, starring Ms. Nora Aunor. "Tuos" won the Audience Choice Award along with four other technical awards at the 12th edition of Cinemalaya.

== Writing ==
In 2002, Laban wrote a one-act play on domestic violence which received recognition from the Don Carlos Palanca Memorial Awards for Literature.

As a Fellow of the Southeast Asian Press Alliance (SEAPA) in 2007, Laban was also a contributing writer of the book Wrong Against Rights: Impunity Across Southeast Asia, where he wrote about the challenges faced by the fledgling East Timor press and the country’s quest to find justice to human rights violations under the 25 years of Indonesian occupation.

== Awards ==
Laban's awards include: the Grand Prize at the 2014 UNICEF Asia Pacific Child Rights Awards for the documentary "Ulilang Lubos", a Gold World Medal at the 2008 New York Festivals for Television for "Batang Kalakal", two Silver World Medals at the 2012 New York Festivals for Television for "Bente Dos" and "Yaman sa Basura", a Finalist Certificate at the 2013 New York Festivals for Television, Silver Screen Awards at the 2008 and 2014 US International Film and Video Festival, finalist citations at the 2014 International URTI Grand Prix for Author's Documentary in Monaco, 2012 PopDev Television Awards and the 2013 UNICEF Child Rights Award and an Ani ng Dangal Award from the National Commission for Culture and the Arts. Last year, he was a Fellow of the Jakarta-based DocNet Southeast Asia Producers Strategy Workshop initiated by the Goethe-Institut Indonesien held in Kuala Lumpur, Malaysia. In 2002, the Don Carlos Palanca Memorial Awards for Literature recognized a one-act play he wrote about domestic violence.

== Death ==
While being in critical condition after testing positive for COVID-19, Laban died on July 25, 2021.
