= Rosario (2010 film) =

2010 period drama by Albert Martinez

- Theatrical release poster
- Directed by: Alberto P. Martinez
- Written by: Elmer Gatchalian; Manny Pangilinan
- Produced by: Bong Sta. Maria
- Starring: Jennylyn Mercado; Sid Lucero; Dennis Trillo
- Narrated by: Dolphy
- Cinematography: Carlo Mendoza
- Edited by: John Wong
- Music by: Albert Chang
- Production companies: Cinemabuhay International; Studio 5
- Distributed by: Solar Entertainment
- Release date: December 25, 2010 (MMFF)
- Country: Philippines
- Languages: Filipino; Spanish

Rosario is a 2010 Philippine period drama film directed by Albert Martinez and written by Elmer Gatchalian. Starring Jennylyn Mercado, Dennis Trillo, Isabel Oli, Sid Lucero, and Eula Valdez, with a special participation by Dolphy, the film tells the story of Manuel V. Pangilinan's grandmother.

Produced by TV5 Network and Cinemabuhay International, the film was theatrically released on December 25, 2010, as an official entry to the 36th Metro Manila Film Festival.

== Plot ==
Manny Pangilinan's uncle, Jesus writes a letter to the chairman of TV5. Upon reaching to the network station, Jesus tells his nephew a story about Rosario, Jesus' mother.

Rosario, is a sophisticated Filipina flapper in the 1920s who has just arrived from New York City, and is spending her vacation in their hacienda. She is the mestiza daughter of Portuguese ship captain Don Enrique and Filipina Doña Adela, Rosario is a passionate woman who lives according to her heart's desires and is ahead of her time. She meets and falls in love with Vicente Velez, an older man who manages the tobacco plantation owned by Rosario's family. When Rosario's father finds out about his daughter's scandalous affair, he sends Rosario to a convent. She escapes, and elopes with Vicente to Manila where they raise a family. But Rosario's life of married bliss slowly crumbles when Vicente becomes ill with tuberculosis, and she is lured to committing adultery. Temptation and scandal still hound Rosario as she continues to defy the moral restrictions of her time.

She finally commits adultery by having a relationship with another man named Alberto Fernandez, Vicente learns that his wife had cheating on him after their daughter Maria Rosario discover their affair, he decides to leave her with his daughter. After recovering from his tuberculosis, he soon files a case of adultery towards both Rosario and Alberto as well as he was silently informed by his friend Carmen that Rosario was also pregnant with Alberto's child as the court finds Rosario and Alberto guilty of adultery and sentenced them to exile for three years, six months and twenty one days. During the exile, they go to Hong Kong, where Rosario gives birth to Alberto's son, Jesus. Years later, they return to the Philippines and travel in different provinces until they decide to stay in Manila. Rosario, Alberto and Jesus live in an apartment complex owned by his friend Miguel Delgado. During their stay, Miguel's caretaker, Carding also has interests towards Rosario, leading Alberto to lost his interest to both her and his own son, thinking she was cheating on him when he finally gets a job.

Rosario's entire life changes from a sophisticated flapper to a poor housewife. She was soon received a ticket where she can finally meet her now grown daughter Maria Rosario whose name is changed to Soledad and perform the piano in her concert. Upon meeting her former family while Vicente was away to fetch Soledad's step-mother, Carmen. Rosario sadly learns that her former family including Soledad had never acknowledged her as both a mother and a former wife due to her adultery and Soledad had learned to hate her own mother. Vicente confronts Rosario who has already atoned for her sins but they refuse to accept her apology and leave her. Four months later, Rosario is having troubles with her debt on her rent from Manuel. As Carding discovers that Rosario is having sex with Miguel as payment for her debts, he angrily pummels him to death and tells her and her son to leave.

Back in the present, Jesus continues to tell his nephew that he was raised by his father's relatives since Rosario had left Carding who decided not to destroy his life by taking another relationship. He soon gives his nephew the few remaining pictures of Rosario that survived a flood. They have no money to buy lots in the cemetery but instead rent the tomb for her corpse. When they have no rent to pay, her tomb is given away and Rosario's corpse is removed, never to be seen again. Jesus tells his nephew that all his mother wanted was to ask forgiveness for her sins but was unable to make amends to her parents, her husband, and her own children.

After encountering his nephew Manny, Jesus succeeds in bringing together of both families of Rosario. Telling his mother's life story was enough to seek her forgiveness she had longed for. Despite everything it happened, he loves his mother and she will remain in his memory.

== Cast ==
=== Main cast ===
- Jennylyn Mercado as Rosario Pereira
- Dennis Trillo as Alberto Fernandez
- Yul Servo as Vicente Velez
- Jerold Aceron as Hesus
- Isabel Oli as Carmen
- Sid Lucero as Carding

=== Minor cast ===
- Dolphy as the elder Hesus
- Phillip Salvador as Don Enrique Pereira
- Eula Valdez as Doña Adela Pereira
- Ricky Davao as Miguel Delgado
- Empress Schuck as Soledad Velez
- Chanda Romero as Tenant
- Liza Lorena as Jesus' wife

=== Cameo appearances ===
- Tonton Gutierrez as Party Guest
- Dino Imperial as Party Guest
- Jaime Fabregas as Party Guest
- Rita Avila as the Helper
- Ronaldo Valdez as the Priest
- Albert Martinez as the Ship Captain
- Ara Mina as the Doctor
- Precious Lara Quigaman as the Carnival Queen
- Bing Loyzaga as the Tenant
- Liezl Martinez as Mother Superior
- Desiree Del Valle as the Party Singer
- Jamie Rivera as the Zarzuela Singer
- Chinggoy Alonzo as the Tenant
- Manny Pangilinan as Himself

== Reception ==
The film's cast received favorable reviews from both critics and audiences.

== Awards ==
Year	Award-Giving Body	Category	Recipient	Result
2010
2010	Metro Manila Film Festival			
2010	Metro Manila Film Festival	Second Best Picture	Rosario	Won
2010	Metro Manila Film Festival	Best Supporting Actor	Dolphy	Won
2010	Metro Manila Film Festival	Gatpuno Antonio J. Villegas Cultural Awards	Rosario	Won
2010	Metro Manila Film Festival	Best Cinematography	Carlo Mendoza	Won
2010	Metro Manila Film Festival	Best Editing	John Wong	Won
2010	Metro Manila Film Festival	Best Production Design	Joey Luna	Won
2010	Metro Manila Film Festival	Best Float	Rosario	Won
2011	Metro Manila Film Festival			
2011	27th PMPC Star Awards for Movies			
2011	27th PMPC Star Awards for Movies	Movie of the Year	Rosario	Nominated
2011	27th PMPC Star Awards for Movies	Movie Actor of the Year	Yul Servo	Nominated
2011	27th PMPC Star Awards for Movies	Movie Director of the Year	Albert Martinez	Nominated
2011	27th PMPC Star Awards for Movies	Movie Supporting Actor of the Year	Sid Lucero	Nominated
2011	27th PMPC Star Awards for Movies	Movie Original Screenplay of the Year	Rosario	Nominated
2011	27th PMPC Star Awards for Movies	Movie Cinematographer of the Year	Carlo Mendoza	Nominated
2011	27th PMPC Star Awards for Movies	Movie Musical Scorer of the Year	Albert Chang	Nominated
2011	27th PMPC Star Awards for Movies	Movie Sound Engineer of the Year	Warren Santiago	Nominated
2011	27th PMPC Star Awards for Movies	Movie Production Designer of the Year	Joey Luna	Won
2011	29th Luna Awards			
2011	29th Luna Awards	Best Picture	Rosario	Nominated
2011	29th Luna Awards	Best Actress	Jennylyn Mercado	Nominated
2011	29th Luna Awards	Best Supporting Actor	Dennis Trillo	Nominated
2011	29th Luna Awards	Best Supporting Actor	Sid Lucero	Nominated
2011	29th Luna Awards	Best Supporting Actor	Dolphy	Nominated
2011	29th Luna Awards	Best Supporting Actor	Yul Servo	Won
2011	29th Luna Awards	Best Screenplay		Won
2011	29th Luna Awards	Best Cinematography	Carlo Mendoza	Won
2011	29th Luna Awards	Best Production Design	Joey Luna	Won
2011	29th Luna Awards	Best Music	Albert Chang	Won
2011	59th FAMAS Awards			
2011	59th FAMAS Awards	Best Picture	Rosario	Nominated
2011	59th FAMAS Awards	Best Actress	Jennylyn Mercado	Nominated
2011	59th FAMAS Awards	Best Actor	Dennis Trillo	Nominated
2011	59th FAMAS Awards	Best Supporting Actor	Sid Lucero	Nominated
2011	59th FAMAS Awards	Best Director	Albert Martinez	Won
2011	59th FAMAS Awards	Best Story		Nominated
2011	59th FAMAS Awards	Best Screenplay		Nominated
2011	59th FAMAS Awards	Best Cinematography	Carlo Mendoza	Won
2011	59th FAMAS Awards	Best Editing		Nominated
2011	59th FAMAS Awards	Best Sound	Warren Santiago	Nominated
2011	59th FAMAS Awards	Best Musical Score	Albert Chang	Nominated
2011	59th FAMAS Awards	Best Art Direction		Won
2011	59th FAMAS Awards	Best Special Effects		Nominated
2011	59th FAMAS Awards	Best Visual Effects		Nominated
