= Gwen Zamora =

Filipina actress and model (born 1990)

- Born: Gwenaelle Tasha Mae Agnese; August 10, 1990 (age 36); Galiwin'ku, Northern Territory, Australia
- Other names: Gwenaelle, Gwen
- Occupations: Actress, comedian, performer, model, host, dancer
- Years active: 2010–present
- Agents: Sparkle (2010–2016; 2025-present) Viva Artists Agency; ABS-CBN Entertainment
- Spouse: David Semerád (m. 2021)
- Children: 2
- Awards: PEP Forum Awards

Gwenaelle Tasha Mae Agnese (born August 10, 1990), known professionally as Gwen Zamora, is a Filipina-French actress, model and former dancer in the Philippines. She was previously under GMA Network for six years until switching management to Viva Artists Agency and she now does freelance projects with both ABS-CBN and GMA Network.

== Biography ==
Zamora was born in Australia to Italian-French dad and Filipino-Vietnamese mom. She spent her life in Australia, China and Thailand before moved to the Philippines when she was 14, Zamora has enrolled in Digital Filmmaking at the De La Salle–College of Saint Benilde. At 19, she has traveled the world and has lived in different countries because of her father.

Zamora joined GMA Network, playing Cinderella in the evening teleserye, Grazilda. She also starred in the film Si Agimat at si Enteng Kabisote a film produced by GMA Films.
She appeared in Alakdana and in the television series Machete in January 2011, which was followed by Biritera and My Beloved.

Zamora joined in a GMA Christmas reality show, Puso ng Pasko: Artista Challenge in December 2010 and stars in the GMA horror comedy anthology, Spooky Nights Presents: Snow White Lady and the Seven Ghost and Spooky Nights Presents: Panata which premiered in 2011.

On August 15, 2019, Zamora gave birth to their first child with basketball player David Semerád. They were married in France on February 13, 2021.

== 2010–present ==
=== GMA Network (2010–2016) ===
She signed a three-year exclusive contract with GMA Network and starred in its several programs.

Zamora played Faye Kabisote, an Engkantada Princess, in the 2010 Official Entry to the Metro Manila Film Festival, Si Agimat at si Enteng Kabisote. The movie is top-billed by Vic Sotto and Sen. Bong Revilla.

=== ABS-CBN and GMA-7 (2016–present) ===
She appeared on ABS-CBN's Be My Lady as Sophia Elizalde, her first show out of GMA Network while also a freelancer and then performed in ASAP. She made her return to Kapuso channel though was not visible on any of the teleseryes produced by the network and just appeared in non-drama soap programs though had a role in Dear Uge. Zamora staged a Kapamilya comeback and appeared on comedy-gag show Banana Sundae and a special participation role as the young version of Divina played by veteran actress, Pilar Pilapil, in Nang Ngumiti ang Langit, which also marks her return to television dramas.

=== Talent ===
Zamora has already appeared in numerous programs from Grazilda to Alakdana; and she already had her first co-starring role in a movie opposite Vic Sotto.

=== FHM ===
In 2011, she was voted as FHM Philippines' Sexiest Woman in the World Rank 42.

== Filmography ==
=== Television ===
Year	Title	Role	Note
2010–2011	Grazilda	Cinderella	Supporting Cast
2010	36th Metro Manila Film Festival	Herself	Guest Appearance
2010	Party Pilipinas	Co-Host / Performer	Guest Appearance
2010	Eat Bulaga	Guest / Performer	Guest Appearance
2010	Puso ng Pasko: Artista Challenge	Herself / Challenger	Guest Appearance
2010–2016	Bubble Gang	Herself / Various Roles	Main cast
2011	Alakdana	Rachel Dinagul / Krista Eisenhower	Supporting Cast
2011	Pablo S. Gomez's Machete	Serena Johns	Supporting Cast
2011	Show Me Da Manny	Lara	Guest Appearance
2011	Spooky Nights: Snow White Lady and the Seven Ghost	Liza	Episode Guest
2011	Spooky Nights: Panata	Jessa	Episode Guest
2012	Biritera	Iris	Supporting Cast
2012	My Beloved	Young Lily	Guest Cast
2012–2013	Aso ni San Roque	Anaira	Supporting Cast
2013	Indio	Pandaki	Extended Cast
2013	Binoy Henyo	Emily Sandoval	Main Cast
2013	Magpakailanman: Kambal na Sapi	Racquel	Episode Guest
2013	Magpakailanman: May AIDS Ang Asawa Ko	Grace	Episode Guest
2014	Sunday All Stars	Herself	Guest Appearance
2014	Innamorata	Señorita Alejandra Miranda-Padilla	Main Cast
2014	Pepito Manaloto	Teacher Gina	Guest Appearance
2014	Ilustrado	Suzanne Jacoby	Guest Appearance
2014	My Destiny	Wedding Planner	Special Participation
2015	My Mother's Secret	Vivian Pastor-Guevarra	Main Cast / Protagonist
2015	Maynila: Unexpected Love Boarder	Sheena	Episode Guest
2015	Little Nanay	Lorna Vallejo-Batongbuhay	Special participation
2016	Be My Lady	Sophia Elizalde	Special participation
2016	ASAP	Herself / co-host / Performer	Guest Appearance
2017	Bubble Gang	Herself	Guest Appearance
2017	Jackpot En Poy	Herself	Guest Player
2017	The Lolas' Beautiful Show	Herself	Guest Appearance
2017	Dear Uge	Episode guest	Main role
2017	Tonight with Arnold Clavio	Herself	Guest Appearance
2017	Idol sa Kusina	Herself	Special guest
2019	Nang Ngumiti ang Langit	Young Divina	Special Participation
2026	Born to Shine	Miss Cali	

=== Film ===
Year	Title	Role
2012	My Kontrabida Girl	cameo appearance
2012	The Witness	Angel Williams
2012	Boy Pick-Up: The Movie	Bombshell 1
2012	Si Agimat, si Enteng Kabisote at si Ako	Faye Kabisote
2013	Ang Huling Henya	French girl
2015	Apocalypse Child	Serena
2015	Straight to the Heart	Jeans
2018	Goyo: Ang Batang Heneral	Señorita Remedios Nable Jose

=== Music video appearances ===
Year	Title	Performer	Director	Ref.
2018	Susi	Ben&Ben	Jerrold Tarog	

== Awards and nominations ==
Year	Film Award/Critics	Award	Result
2010	Si Agimat at Si Enteng Kabisote	New Movie Actress of the Year	Nominated
2010	36th Metro Manila Film Festival	Best Actress for Si Agimat at Si Enteng Kabisote	Nominated
2010	36th Metro Manila Film Festival	PEP Forum Awards	Won
2011	FHM Philippines	100 Sexiest Women	Ranked # 42
2012	FHM Philippines	100 Sexiest Women	Ranked # 89
2013	FHM Philippines	100 Sexiest Women	Ranked # 85
2014	FHM Philippines	100 Sexiest Women	Not Included
2015	FHM Philippines	100 Sexiest Women	Ranked # 73
2016	FHM Philippines	100 Sexiest Women	Not Included
