= RPG Metanoia =

2010 Philippine animated adventure film

- MMFF release poster
- Directed by: Luis C. Suárez
- Screenplay by: Luis C. Suárez; Jade Castro; Tey Clamor
- Story by: Luis C. Suárez
- Produced by: Lelette Bontia; Ann Gatmaytan; Ned Villarama
- Starring: Zaijan Jaranilla; Aga Muhlach; Eugene Domingo; Vhong Navarro
- Edited by: Joey Conejos; Joana Vasquez
- Music by: Ria Osorio; Gerard Salonga
- Production companies: Star Cinema; Ambient Media; Thaumatrope Animation Production
- Distributed by: Star Cinema
- Release date: December 25, 2010
- Running time: 103 minutes
- Country: Philippines
- Languages: Filipino; English
- Budget: ₱100 million
- Box office: ₱33 million

RPG Metanoia is a 2010 Filipino animated epic comedy-drama film directed by Luis C. Suárez in his directorial debut, from a story solely written and screenplay co-written with Jade Castro and Tey Clamor. Produced by Ambient Media, Thaumatrope Animation and Star Cinema, RPG Metanoia is the first feature-length Philippine animated film presented entirely in 3D CGI (as of 2025, the only film to do so). With a budget of ₱100 million, it became the most expensive Philippine animated film to date until Zsazsa Zaturnnah.

The film blends elements of science fantasy and action-adventure genres, traditional culture, and online role-playing video games, along with certain themes of friendship and resentment. The film follows Nico (voiced by Zaijan Jaranilla in his film acting debut), an introverted boy who is obsessed with playing an MMORPG game along with his friends when a virus starts infecting the game and spreads into the real world, and Nico and his gang are tasked to stop the infection and save their world. The film features an ensemble cast including Eugene Domingo, Aga Muhlach, Mika dela Cruz, Jairus Aquino, Basty Alcances, and Ketchup Eusebio.

RPG Metanoia premiered in Philippine cinemas on December 25, 2010, as an official entry at the 2010 Metro Manila Film Festival, which received twelve nominations (the most of any animated films at the festival) and won four awards including the title for 3rd Best Picture, Best Sound Recording and Best Original Theme Song, as well as the Quezon City's special citation for animation in Most Gender-Sensitive Film. Despite its critical success at the film festival's awards night, the film was a box-office disappointment with a total of ₱33 million against a ₱100 million budget.

== Plot ==
An introverted boy named Nico plays Metanoia at midnight, accesses as a mysterious boy under his playable character Zero goes on an underground hidden stage where the special item "Helm of Destiny" is located, soon to be discovered was inside of a three-headed metal boss. One day, Nico and his gang (Bryan, Mark, Bobby, Daniel, and a new friend May) are tormented by Andrew and David to challenge for Metanoia's worldwide tournament in exchange of playing Metanoia again if his gang win the tournament; otherwise, they will get banned from entering an Internet cafe "Bomb Shelter". At night, his mother promises him to not play Metanoia one day and instead he will join her for a game of badminton at the park during his last summer week.

The next morning, Nico forgets his promise and goes on to the Bomb Shelter for his sake. In the midst of the tournament, his gang (Mang Ernie, Ahdonis, Sumpak and K'Mao) infiltrated the stages and Nico took the blue orb to access the winning point but are defeated by a mysterious player under his playable character Sargo, and fell off a special item to the ground. Saddened by the loss, Nico is reluctant to go with his gang and plays Metanoia one more instead to get a slime species named Jiglie, but it is caught by a new player, Cassandra, May's playable character. Nico feels disappointed over the loss of worldwide tournament and ban of Bomb Shelter led to his friends' resentment as May decided to play outside games with their gang rather than Metanoia to regain their friendship. As the gang keep up playing traditional games over a few hours, his mother felt relieved over his enthusiasm and Nico fulfills her promise to join badminton at the park.

Meanwhile, Sargo took the special item found on the final stage of the tournament Nico fell, and wears it at the top of the tower, becoming more belligerent and manipulative. Sargo's manipulation process infiltrates various channels and infects every stronger players in Metanoia and become an army, leaving other players offline.

In afternoon, Nico felts frustrated over the gang's mockery and teasing as May's potential boyfriend, causes his tension by ranting against the gang as well as his envious over May led to her resentment, breaking up their friendship. Nico then betrays Bryan for his decision to let the Bomb Shelter into playing Metanoia with Andrew and David despite his ban, leaving Bryan frustrated. As Sargo and his army's infiltration continues, Bryan follows his gang to the Bomb Shelter and found out Andrew and David have been infected by Sargo after Bryan safely goes offline while in infiltration. After realizing a devastating news, Nico plays Metanoia one last time and assembles the gang to fight off the infected players. Unbeknownst to Nico, his gang find out a special item Nico took it earlier was actually a Trojan Horse, its subliminal signals through the game's graphic interface which causes the entire game to infect not only players or computer system itself but in real people's brain; it was revealed that a European program developed a subliminal reality system as an experiment to make volunteers unconscious to keep out from going insane and taps into dreams, but was backfired as soon as volunteers were mentally lobotomized by the system as a result, the program re-purposed and sold the system as a game engine, branded the name Metanoia. Upon realizing the other players are in grave danger, Nico announces everyone in Metanoia through a world message to assemble the gang as a whole, aiming to destroy the virus to reverse its consciousness.

While Nico reconciles Bryan and May over his misunderstanding, the gang goes on the chapel to fight off the army as the other international players, including Nico's father, arrived and assemble. As the fight intensifies, Nico is fatally blasted by an infected giant, saving May's life. In the afterlife, Zero reveals to Nico that Sargo's real player was Cel, an owner of Bomb Shelter. Zero wants to join with the gang to finish the army off and Nico becomes a hero, but Nico refused to do help with him and instead wanting to do a normal life with his mother and gang, causing Zero forcibly fights against him but is backfired and disappeared by Nico's beliefs.

Back to the real world, Nico awakens and finds out his mother is being vegetated by his computer. He marches through the Bomb Shelter with his rusty bike as the gang and the army continue to intensify, and reveals to the gang that Cel is still inside, the only way to defeat him by forcing him out of the game. The gangs are running out of stamina and being manipulated by Sargo as the assemble outside continue to fight, leaving May and Jiglie intact in the church. Nico realizes Jiglie is the key to melt down any metal, also believes the special item that contains metal too, and calls May to throw Jiglie into Sargo's head, restoring everyone's consciousness and declares victory.

Back to his home, his mother is still vegetated; the artificial intelligence itself revealed is a Metanoia, who caused to infect Nico's mother as revenge. Metanoia is soon to proceed with their own ultimate directive to his mother and she will be permanently frozen in a catatonic state if he does push the reset button. He forces Metanoia by himself instead, but the computer crashes, ends its existence.

The gang and Cel are invited to May's birthday, and the news are spreading the world over the assembles' heroism at the event of Metanoia crisis. At the first day of school, May gives Nico a newly-designed yo-yo that resembles from the game.

== Voice cast ==
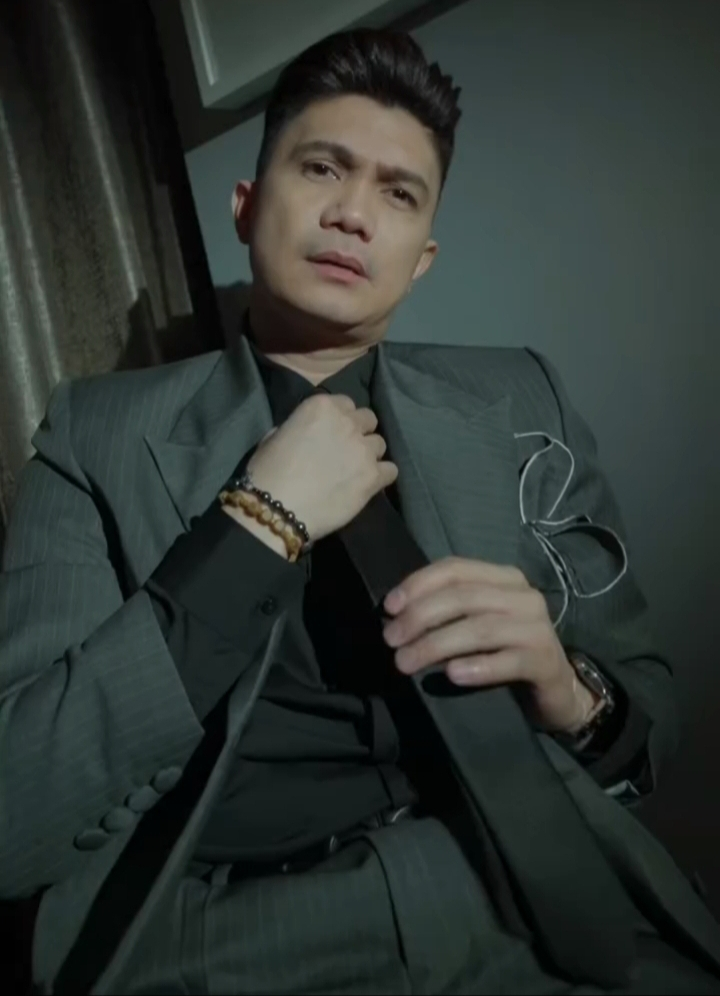
Vhong Navarro

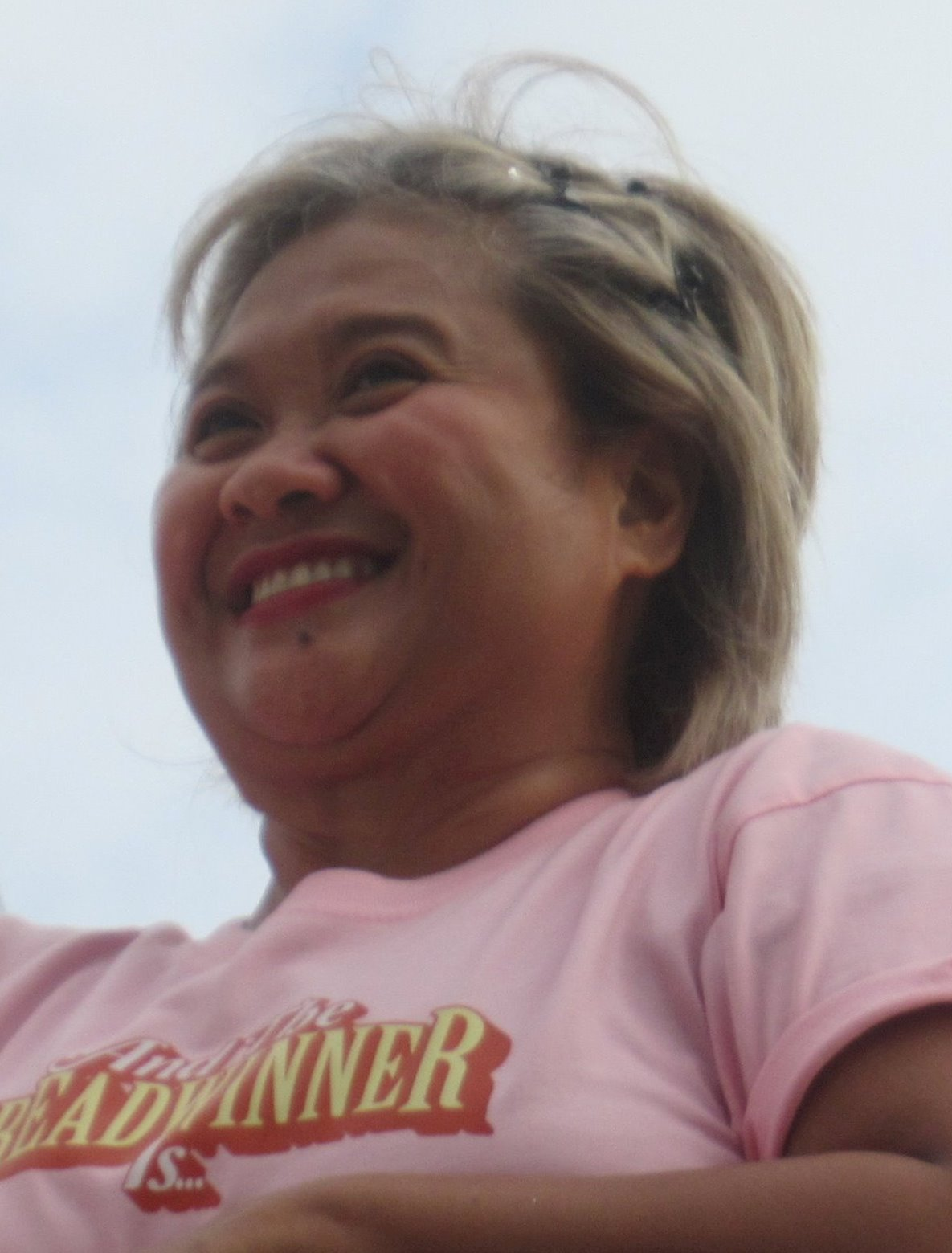
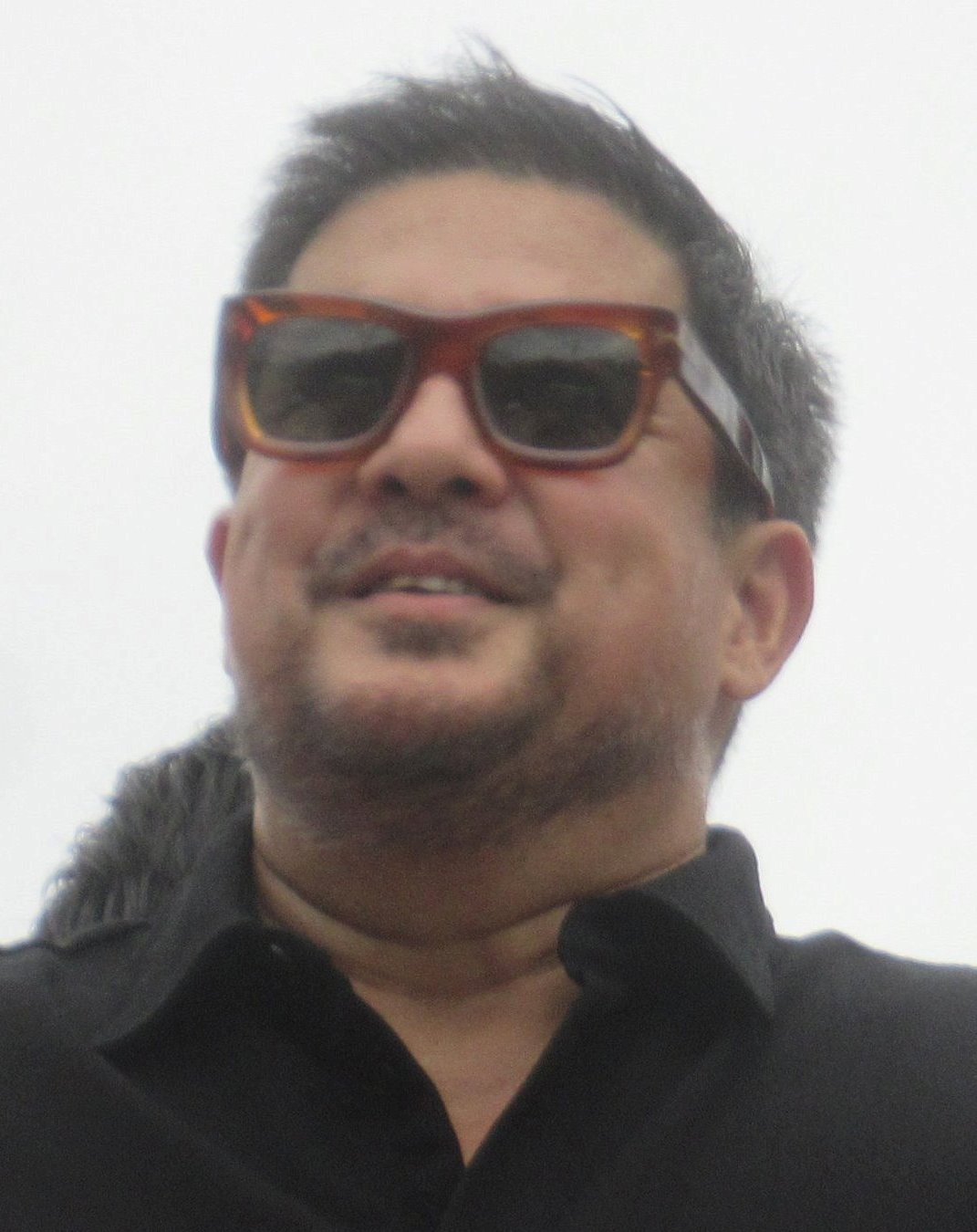
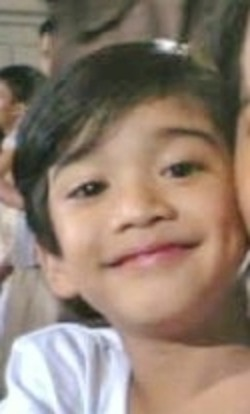
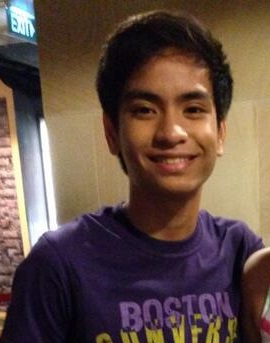
Star Cinema's regulars Vhong Navarro, Eugene Domingo and Aga Muhlach, along with Zaijan Jaranilla and Jairus Aquino appeared in the film.

Main cast and characters of RPG Metanoia
VOICE CAST	USER	AVATAR	DESCRIPTION
Vhong Navarro	Cel	Sargo	A ruthless owner of Internet cafe Bomb Shelter. A mysterious spear wielder.
Eugene Domingo	Mom	—N/a	Nico's mother who currently lives in middle-class neighborhood with her son, Nico, but cannot relate to her son's passion for video games.
Eugene Domingo	—N/a	Metanoia	An infected artificial intellingence who manipulates reality behind its monitors, taunts Nico by using his mother as a hostage.
Aga Muhlach	Dad	Robotic Armor	Nico's OFW father who currently lives in Dubai for high-financial jobs and also often plays Metanoia, made his influence of gaming to Nico. An armored robot suit user.
Zaijian Jaranilla	Nico	Zero	A shy, reserved boy who finds confidence through Metanoia with his gang. A yo-yo whip wielder.
Mika dela Cruz	May	Cassandra	A tomboyish-like talented girl who enjoys basketball and also plays Metanoia. A beast tamer.
Jairus Aquino	Bryan	Mang Ernie	Nico's best friend and one of the members of Nico's gang. A Katipunan-style umbrella gun wielder.
Basty Alcances	Mark	Ahdonis	A chickboy yet sassy member of Nico's gang. A dual Arnis wielder.
Aaron Junatas	Bobby	Sumpak	An overweight yet stuttering but genius-level member of Nico's gang. A bazooka sharpshooter.
Jonas Calapatan	Daniel	K'Mao	A sudoku-obsessed member of Nico's gang. A martial art fighter.
Ketchup Eusebio	Andrew	Bossing	A bully and rival of Nico's gang who blackmailing them into restriction from enter Bomb Shelter, although only Bryan secretly playing Metanoia with Andrew and David before Sargo's infiltration. A gunslinger.
Igi Boy Flores	David	Sidekick	Andrew's sidekick who also plays Metanoia under his playable character of the same name.

== Production ==
=== Development ===
RPG Metanoia took five years to make. Luis Suárez stated that the idea for the film came from his time with his nephew during summer (March–May). He asked his nephew what he wanted to do and he said he wanted to play online RPG games, so they went to a café and Luis spent the whole day with his nephew inside it. He then wanted to make a story for him for his nephew to see what he is missing in life. Originally titled RPG, he added with the term Metanoia, means "change or evolution", and in gaming terms, "leveling up!".

Suárez detailed the interview about the main characters, "All the lead characters were based on people I know. Nico was inspired by my real nephew, who at one point in his life was in pretty much the same situation as the character in the movie. I used my best friends from grade school as the template for Nico’s friends. Though some of their looks, characteristics and attitudes were adjusted for better storytelling, the group dynamic remained intact. More often than not, the script was driven by what the real person would probably say or do when faced with the same situation. May was mostly inspired by my girlfriend Jenny who used to make her own jewelry and loves the color purple, which is evident in her avatar’s accessories. She also pushes me to do my best in the things I do just like May does for Nico in the movie."

=== Pre-production ===
Thaumatrope Animation began work in 2006 and Ambient Media serve as a production company for the film, features a mix of professional and amateur staff members from storyboard and initial rendering to the dubbing process. According to Robert Charles Chien of Ambient Media, they have around 26 animators who worked on. The design of local Metanoia server was inspired by Spanish colonization in the Philippines, particularly the walled city of Intramuros, along with the floating islands, were inspired by side-scrolling video games.

In August 2009, Ambient Media officially partnered with ABS-CBN via Star Cinema.

=== Casting ===
When Star Cinema came on board, they provided guest child actors from the children show Goin' Bulilit and reality competition Star Circle Quest including Basty Alcances, Jairus Aquino, Mika dela Cruz, and Zaijan Jaranilla. Film regulars from Star Cinema including Vhong Navarro as the main antagonist; Eugene Domingo was Suárez's only choice for her role as Nico’s mother; Aga Muhlach eventually get into his part as Nico’s father in the film.

== Music ==
The original film score was composed by Ria Osorio and Gerard Salonga, with the Filharmonika Orchestra performing their composition.

=== Album ===
RPG Metanoia: The Album

Soundtrack album by Various Artists
- Released: October 19, 2010
- Genre: Pinoy pop
- Length: 40:18
- Label: Star Music
- Producer: ABS-CBN Film Productions, Inc.

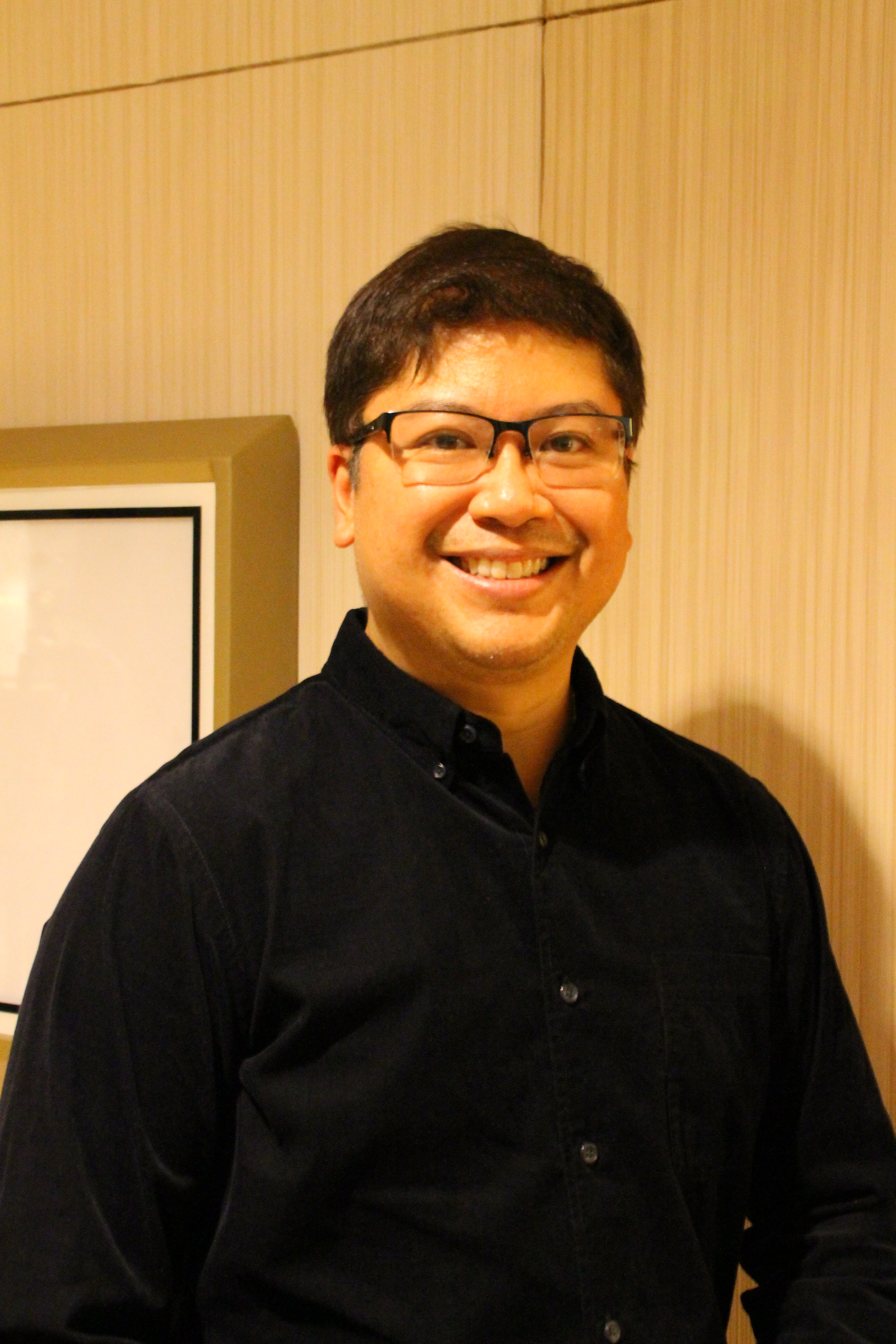
Gerard Salonga serves as a conductor and co-composer in the film.

RPG Metanoia: The Album is the official compilation soundtrack album of the film published by Star Music. The theme song of the film "Kaya Mo" was sung by Protein Shake featuring Ney of the band 6Cyclemind and Kean of Callalily; the song is the album's single. An accompanying music video was made for the single and will be launched on August 19.

All lyrics are written by Apo Hiking Society, Jett Pangan and other well-known Filipino musicians.

No.	Title	Lyrics	Length
1.	"Metanoia"	Novus Lana	3:10
2.	"Kaya Mo! (transl. "You Can Do It!")"	Kean Cipriano, Ney Dimaculangan and Tutti Caringal	3:59
3.	"Bawat Bata (transl. "Every Child")"	Apo Hiking Society	3:15
4.	"Frantic Static"	Undercover Grasshopper	3:34
5.	"Aminin Mo (transl. "Admit It")"	Julianne Tarroja	3:38
6.	"Bahaghari (transl. "Rainbow")"	Rommel Tuico	5:25
7.	"Game Na (transl. "You Game")"	Jeanette Ricasio	2:56
8.	"A Mental Picture of You"	Cattski	4:07
9.	"Ako ang Bayani (transl. "I Am a Hero")"	Jett Pangan	5:47
10.	"The Spaces in Between"	Ria Osorio	4:26
Total length:			40:18

== Release ==
Float Parade of Casts

In 2008, a teaser trailer for the movie (then titled "theRPGmovie") was shown at Level Up's Ragnarok Online event at the World Trade Center.

In June 2010, it was announced to be an official entry for the 36th Metro Manila Film Festival. In August 2010, RPG Metanoia's official website was launched. The Cinema Evaluation Board gave the movie a Grade A. MTRCB gave the film a rated G (General Patronage).

The film was released on DVD on April 26, 2013, by Star Home Video.

External videos
- RPG Metanoia hosted on ABS-CBN Star Cinema's official YouTube channel

The entire film was made available for streaming online through user-generated content website YouTube on December 21, 2025, although, like most Philippine films, drew copyright songs were replaced to the sound library.

== Reception ==
=== Box office ===
Following the MMFF's premiere, RPG Metanoia earn a total of ₱33 million for four-week release but it was a box-office disappointment over its production cost of ₱100 million, like the previous three animated features.

=== Critical reception ===
Julius Edward B. Penascosa of The Philippine Star gave RPG Metanoia a positive review, praising the film for its originality, characters and plot, also noting its depiction of Philippine culture and for not relying on star power as seen with mainstream MMFF entries; the film's voice acting however was criticized, likening the actors' performances to a typical Tagalog dub of an anime series.

Philbert Ortiz Dy of ClickTheCity.com declared the film worthy of comparison to animated features released by Pixar, the studio behind animated films such as Toy Story 3, Up, WALL-E, and Cars, stating: "Regular readers are probably aware of how highly I regard Pixar and their work, and so it should taken as high praise when I say that I would proudly hold RPG Metanoia up against even the best of Pixar. The film is simply extraordinary."

=== Accolades ===
RPG Metanoia garnered twelve nominations at the 2010 Metro Manila Film Festival including Best Picture (the first animated film to do so), the most of any animated films at the festival, receiving four (including a runner-up): Third Best Picture, Best Sound Engineering, Best Original Theme Song and Most Gender-Sensitive Film; its four awards for an animated film jointly ties with Dayo: Sa Mundo ng Elementalia. It also won Best Sound at the 29th Luna Awards and nominated six categories at the 8th Golden Screen Awards including Best Motion Picture (Drama), winning Best Visual Effects.

Internationally, RPG Metanoia was nominated for Best Animated Film at the 2011 Asia Pacific Screen Awards, the first Philippine animated film to do so.

Award	Date	Category	Recipient(s)	Result	Ref.
Metro Manila Film Festival	December 26, 2010	Best Picture	RPG Metanoia	Third	
Metro Manila Film Festival	December 26, 2010	Best Director	Luis C. Suárez	Nominated	
Metro Manila Film Festival	December 26, 2010	Best Screenplay	Jade Castro, Tey Clamor and Luis C. Suárez	Nominated	
Metro Manila Film Festival	December 26, 2010	Best Original Story	Luis C. Suárez	Nominated	
Metro Manila Film Festival	December 26, 2010	Best Editing	Joey Conejos and Joana Vasquez	Nominated	
Metro Manila Film Festival	December 26, 2010	Best Musical Score	Ria Osorio and Gerard Salonga	Nominated	
Metro Manila Film Festival	December 26, 2010	Best Original Theme Song	"Kaya Mo" - performed by Protein Shake ft. Ney and Kean Cipriano	Won	
Metro Manila Film Festival	December 26, 2010	Best Production Design	Thaumatrope Animation	Nominated	
Metro Manila Film Festival	December 26, 2010	Best Sound Engineering	Ronald De Asis, Lynell De Mesa, Sandy Aguinaldo and Connie M. Valdriz	Won (Note: Tied with Super Inday and the Golden Bibe.)	
Metro Manila Film Festival	December 26, 2010	Best Visual Effects	Thaumatrope Animation	Nominated	
Metro Manila Film Festival	December 26, 2010	Gatpuno Antonio J. Villegas Cultural Awards	RPG Metanoia	Nominated	
Metro Manila Film Festival	December 26, 2010	Most Gender-Sensitive Film (Note: as "special citation for animation".)	RPG Metanoia	Won (Note: Tied with Ang Tanging Ina Mo (Last na 'To!), another Star Cinema film.)	
Golden Screen Awards	April 2, 2011	Best Motion Picture (Drama)	RPG Metanoia	Nominated	
Golden Screen Awards	April 2, 2011	Best Director	Luis C. Suárez	Nominated	
Golden Screen Awards	April 2, 2011	Best Original Screenplay	Luis C. Suárez	Nominated	
Golden Screen Awards	April 2, 2011	Best Musical Score	Ria Osorio and Gerard Salonga	Nominated	
Golden Screen Awards	April 2, 2011	Best Visual Effects	Thaumatrope Animation	Won	
Golden Screen Awards	April 2, 2011	Best Original Song	"Kaya Mo" - performed by Protein Shake ft. Ney and Kean Cipriano	Nominated	
Luna Award	July 10, 2011	Best Sound	Ronald De Asis, Lynell De Mesa, Sandy Aguinaldo and Connie M. Valdriz	Won	
Asia Pacific Screen Awards	Nov 24, 2011	Best Animated Film	Luis C. Suárez	Nominated	

== See also ==
- .hack
- Sword Art Online
- Ready Player One (2018)
- Free Guy
