= Noy (film) =

- Theatrical poster
- Directed by: Dondon Santos
- Screenplay by: Shugo Praico
- Story by: Rondel P. Lindayag; Rodel Nacianceno; Shugo Praico; Francis Xavier Pasion
- Produced by: Arnel Nacario; Kate Valenzuela
- Starring: Coco Martin
- Cinematography: Timmy Jimenez
- Edited by: Renewin B. Alano
- Music by: Carmina Cuya
- Production companies: CineMedia Films; VIP Access Media
- Distributed by: Star Cinema
- Release date: June 2, 2010
- Running time: 104 minutes
- Country: Philippines
- Languages: Filipino; English

Noy is a 2010 Filipino independent drama film directed by Dondon Santos. It stars Coco Martin and Erich Gonzales and was released under Star Cinema. The film is rated "A" by the Cinema Evaluation Board of the Philippines. It was selected as the Filipino entry for the Best Foreign Language Film at the 83rd Academy Awards. However, the film did not make the final shortlist.

== Plot ==
Forced to find a job as his family's breadwinner, Noy (Coco Martin) poses as a journalist commissioned to come up with a documentary following the campaign trail of his namesake and top presidential bet, Sen. Benigno "Noynoy" Aquino III for the 2010 Philippine National elections.

It started when Noy, who has an ambition to be a news reporter, faked his school records to enter a major TV station, owned by Jane (Vice Ganda). As a reporter, he was assigned to cover Sen. Noynoy's presidential campaigns everywhere. Meanwhile, his girlfriend, Divine (Erich Gonzales), initially discouraged him, was forced to agree. He covered Sen. Aquino's campaigns from Luzon, Visayas and Mindanao, every time, from sunrise to midnight, from live coverage to record editing. His older brother, Bong (Joem Bascon), crippled by polio, jealous at Noy at his lucky streak, unintentionally joined a notorious group at drug dealing.

Meanwhile, some jealous TV presenters investigated Noy's background. They reported it on Jane. Noy was immediately summoned and fired when they found out about his fake identity, but gave him one last shot to cover Sen. Aquino's campaign in Tarlac.

He returns to his home in Artex Compound to see his brother being mauled by two thugs. He was spotted and killed by one of the thugs, falling his body in the floodwater.

In the end of the film, Noy's family observed his death by lighting in the front of his portrait. Simultaneously, Senator Noynoy made his speech in front of the crowds gathered during his campaign.

The film, infused with actual documentary footage inter-cut with dramatic scenes mixed with countless presidential campaign slogans, deals with themes of poverty, survival and hope for the Filipino family.

== Cast ==
=== Main Cast ===
- Coco Martin as Manolo "Noy" Agapito

=== Supporting Cast ===
- Cherry Pie Picache as Letty Agapito
- Joem Bascon as Bong Agapito
- Erich Gonzales as Divine
- Cheska Billiones as Tata
- Baron Geisler as Caloy
- Vice Ganda as Jane
- Ketchup Eusebio as Harold
- Pen Medina as Nick
- Jhong Hilario as Drug Thug 1
- Kristofer King† as Drug Thug 2
- Tess Antonio
- Janus del Prado as Boy
- Ping Medina as Binatang Bangkero
- Neil Ryan Sese as Policeman

=== Special participation ===
- Karen Davila
- Liz Uy
- Boy Abunda as Himself/Cameo
- Kris Aquino as Herself/Cameo
- James Yap as Himself/Cameo
- Ai-Ai delas Alas as Herself/Cameo
- Mariel Rodriguez as Herself/Cameo
- Bianca Gonzales
- Dingdong Dantes as Himself/Cameo
- Marian Rivera as Herself/Cameo
- Jodi Sta. Maria as Herself/Cameo
- Dennis Padilla
- Claudine Barretto
- Sharon Cuneta
- Ogie Alcasid as Himself/Cameo
- Benigno Aquino III as Himself/Cameo

== TV special ==
In observance of the death of Noynoy Aquino who died last June 24, 2021, the film was shown on Kapamilya Channel, Kapamilya Online Live and A2Z on June 27, 2021.
