= Dalaw =

2010 film by Dondon S. Santos

- Theatrical release poster
- Directed by: Dondon S. Santos
- Screenplay by: Joel Mercado; Enrico C. Santos; Jerry Lopez Sineneng; Lawrence Nicodemus; John Paul E. Abellara
- Story by: Joel Mercado; Lawrence Nicodemos; John Paul E. Abellera
- Produced by: Charo Santos-Concio; Malou N. Santos; Kristina Bernadette C. Aquino
- Starring: Kris Aquino
- Cinematography: Anne Monzon
- Edited by: Renewin Alano
- Music by: Cesar Francis S. Concio
- Production companies: Star Cinema; CineMedia; K Productions
- Distributed by: Star Cinema
- Release date: December 25, 2010
- Running time: 100 minutes
- Country: Philippines
- Languages: Filipino; English
- Budget: ₱30 million
- Box office: ₱125 million

Dalaw (lit. 'Visit') is a 2010 Filipino supernatural horror film starring Kris Aquino and Diether Ocampo. The film was released by Star Cinema. It was an official entry at the 2010 Metro Manila Film Festival. It explores the superstition against marrying after just being recently becoming a widow.

== Plot ==
Stella (Aquino) decides to marry Anton (Ocampo) four years after her husband died. She hopes that this marriage will give her son Paolo (Morales) the experience of having a whole family. Anton was her great love before she was forced by her parents to marry Danilo. However, at the wedding, Anton's mother Milagros is left paralyzed and unable to speak after being attacked by an unknown entity who later kills her shortly afterwards. After moving to Anton's place, Stella experiences major hauntings that endanger her and her son. Stella assumes that it was Danilo who was responsible for the hauntings and tries to placate him, only for the hauntings to escalate. Eventually, Stella and Anton's clairvoyant housekeeper Olga realize that the entity responsible is the ghost of Lorna, Anton's ex-girlfriend who was accidentally killed by Anton and buried in a forest. Lorna then attacks Stella's household, killing Olga. Feeling guilt over their predicament, Anton leaves to confront Lorna at her grave but is followed by Stella. In a final confrontation, Lorna kills Anton but is killed in turn by Stella, who arranges for her grave to be hastily blessed as she is comforted by Anton's ghost. Afterwards, Stella and her son move out of Anton's house, unaware of a black liquid oozing out the back of their taxi.

== Cast ==
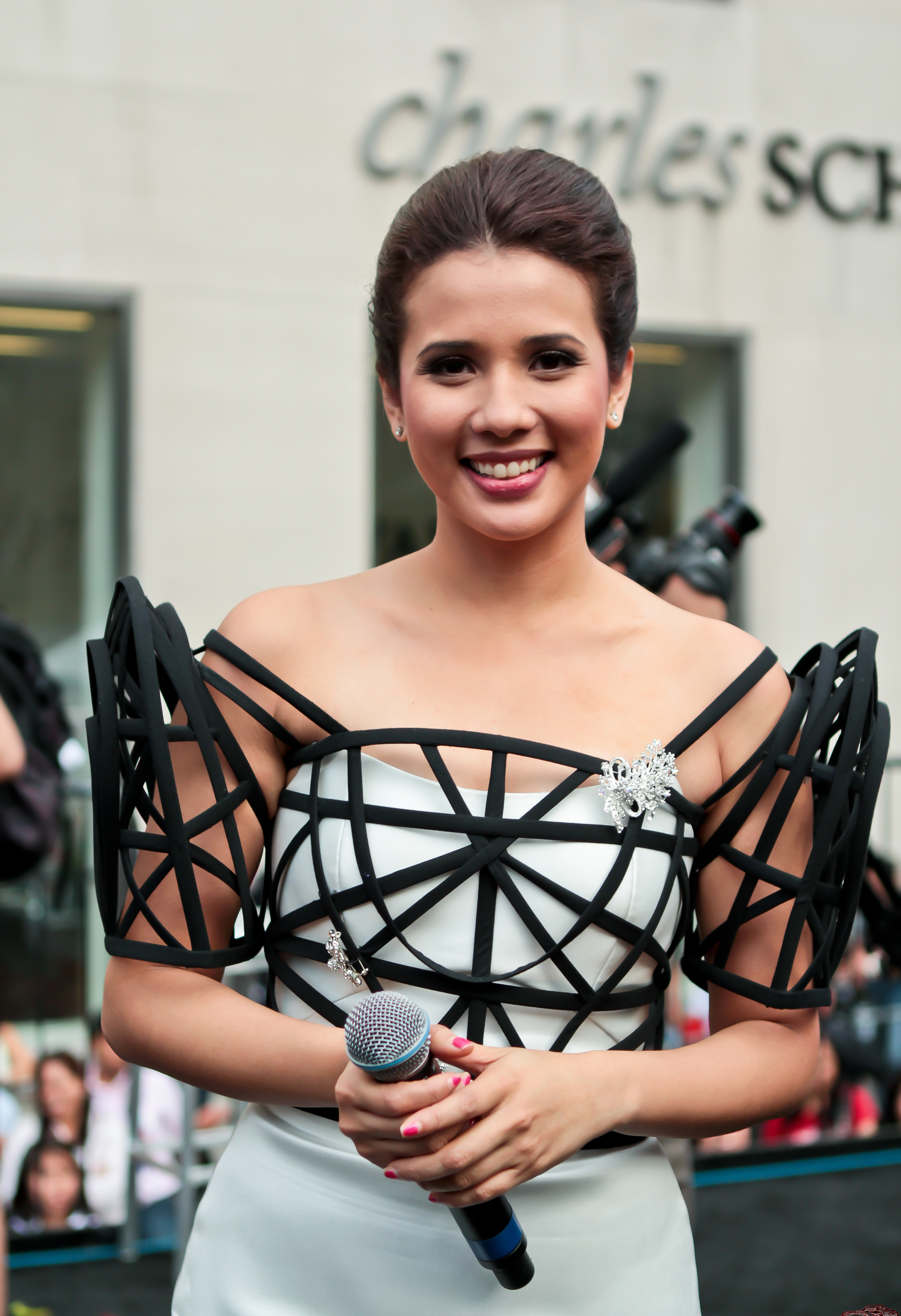
Karylle portrays Lorna.

- Kris Aquino as Stella
- Diether Ocampo as Anton
- Karylle as Lorna
- Alessandra De Rossi as Trina
- Susan Africa as Milagros
- Empress Schuck as Marietta
- Gina Pareño as Olga
- Maliksi Morales as Paolo
- Ina Feleo as Kylie
- Precious Lara Quigaman as Agnes
- Bernard Palanca as Fred
- Lui Villaruz as Johnny
- Richard Quan as Danilo
- Dick Israel as Priest

== Reception ==
Fidel Antonio Medel of PEP.ph predicts that it will do well in the box office even if the film is his least favorite Kris Aquino movie. The Philippine Star praised the cast's performance and the film's narrative even if it has a simple premise.

The film marks the return of Kris Aquino to the horror genre, in which she was tagged as 'Philippine's Box-office Horror Queen' due to the success of her two previous films, Feng Shui and Sukob. The film earned 96 million pesos, placing third on the list of the highest-grossing entries for the 2010 Metro Manila Film Festival.

== See also ==
- List of ghost films
