= Si Agimat at si Enteng Kabisote =

- Theatrical film poster
- Directed by: Tony Y. Reyes
- Written by: Bibeth Orteza; R.J. Nuevas
- Produced by: Jose Mari Abacan; Annette Gozon-Abrogar; Orly R. Ilacad; Antonio P. Tuviera; Marvic Sotto; Marlon M. Bautista
- Starring: Vic Sotto; Ramon "Bong" Revilla Jr.
- Cinematography: Lito 'Itok' Mempin
- Edited by: Chrisel G. Desuasido
- Music by: Jessie Lasaten
- Production companies: OctoArts Films; APT Entertainment; M-Zet Productions; Imus Productions; GMA Pictures
- Distributed by: OctoArts Films; GMA Pictures
- Release date: December 25, 2010
- Running time: 110 minutes
- Country: Philippines
- Language: Filipino
- Budget: ₱45,000,000.00
- Box office: ₱159,000,000 (Official 2010 MMFF run) ₱171,000,000 (Official Domestic Run)

Si Agimat at si Enteng Kabisote (transl. "Amulet and Enteng Kabisote") is a 2010 Filipino action comedy and fantasy crossover film directed by Tony Reyes which stars Vic Sotto and Senator Ramon "Bong" Revilla Jr. This was the union of their famous characters, Enteng Kabisote and Agimat respectively, in one blockbuster movie which grossed a ₱31 million on its opening day. It is followed by a sequel, Si Agimat, si Enteng Kabisote at si Ako. The movie was produced by GMA Pictures.

The film is a seventh movie installment based on the television sitcom, Okay Ka, Fairy Ko!

== Premise ==
Enteng Kabisote (Vic Sotto), a mortal involved with the affairs of the diwata of Encantasia, joins forces with a stern warrior named Agimat (Bong Revilla) in saving their respective worlds from the resurgent evil.

== Cast ==
=== Main cast ===
- Vic Sotto as Enteng Kabisote
- Sen. Bong Revilla Jr. as Agimat
- Gwen Zamora as Faye Kabisote
- Sam Pinto as Samara

=== Supporting cast ===
- Aiza Seguerra as Aiza Kabisote
- Oyo Boy Sotto as Benok Kabisote
- Mikylla Ramirez as Ada Kabisote
- Amy Perez as Ina Magenta
- Peque Gallaga as Ermitanyo
- Bing Loyzaga as Satana
- Jeorge Estregan III as Ragat
- Benjie Paras as Abugan
- Alex Crisano as Balgog
- Jose Manalo as Jose
- Wally Bayola as Bodyguard Bogart
- Ruby Rodriguez as Amy
- Jillian Ward as Bebeng
- Barbie Forteza as Bratty
- Joshua Dionisio as Jayson

=== Extended cast ===
- Marissa Sanchez as Nanay Doray
- Bea Binene as Saling
- Jake Vargas as Odoy
- King Gutierrez as Sartonia
- Saida Diola as Engkantada #1
- Ellen Adarna as Engkantada #2

=== Special guests ===
- Bayani Casimiro Jr. as Prinsipe K
- Rufa Mae Quinto
- Boobay
- Mang Enriquez
- Shalala
- John Feir
- Marissa Delgado

== Filming ==
The filming began in March 2010 and wrapped up three weeks later.

== Reaction ==
While the film opened at #1 on December 25, 2010, with P31,000,000 in ticket sales, it was criticized for being predictable, having sexual innuendos, and having some home-truths as to how Filipino viewers idealize heroism and romance. Also noted is how the film tries to play fair when it comes to mixing the two heroes together.

In an online review, Philbert Ortiz Dy described Si Agimat at si Enteng Kabisote as "really nothing more than a commercial proposition" and that it "took the two highest grossing stars of Filmfests prior and stuffed them together with little rhyme or reason, putting them in the same fantasy adventure settings that made them so successful. There’s precious little love to be found within these frames, all the elements of the film existing for the pure fact that they worked before. This doesn’t even feel like the movie the filmmakers wanted to make."

Although the critical reception was not too good, the movie still ended making P159 million by the end of the festival and went on to have extended showings in theaters.

== Accolades ==
Si Agimat at Si Enteng Kabisote got two awards at the "Gabi ng Parangal" on December 26, 2010.

Year	Award-Giving Body	Category	Recipient	Result
2010	Metro Manila Film Festival	Best Visual Effects	Rico Guttierez	Won
2010	Metro Manila Film Festival	Best Make-up Artist	–	Won
2011	GMMSF Box-Office Entertainment Awards	Box-Office Kings	Vic Sotto and Bong Revilla	Won
2011	GMMSF Box-Office Entertainment Awards	Most Popular Film Director	Tony Y. Reyes (with Wenn Deramas)	Won

== See also ==
- Okay Ka, Fairy Ko! (film series)
