= Miss You like Crazy (film) =

2010 Filipino romantic comedy film by Cathy Garcia-Molina

Miss You Like Crazy
- Theatrical movie poster
- Directed by: Cathy Garcia-Molina
- Screenplay by: Vanessa R. Valdez; Tey Clamor; Juan Miguel Sevilla
- Story by: Vanessa R. Valdez
- Produced by: Charo Santos-Concio; Malou N. Santos
- Starring: John Lloyd Cruz; Bea Alonzo
- Cinematography: Manuel Teehankee
- Edited by: Marya Ignacio
- Music by: Jessie Lasaten
- Production company: Star Cinema
- Distributed by: Star Cinema
- Release date: February 24, 2010
- Running time: 126 minutes
- Country: Philippines
- Languages: Filipino; Bahasa Malaysia
- Box office: ₱143 million

Miss You Like Crazy is a 2010 Filipino romantic comedy film directed by Cathy Garcia-Molina from a story concept by Vanessa R. Valdez, who adapted into a screenplay with Tey Clamor and Juan Miguel Sevilla. The film stars John Lloyd Cruz and Bea Alonzo, with the supporting cast includes Maricar Reyes, Ina Feleo, Ryan Eigenmann, Tirso Cruz III, Bembol Roco, and Sylvia Sanchez.

Produced and distributed by Star Cinema, the film was theatrically released in the Philippines on February 24, 2010, as the post-Valentine's Day offering of the film studio. It was later released in selected cinemas in the United States, including in Los Angeles (California) and Honolulu (Hawaii).

== Plot ==
On a Pasig River ferry boat, Allan, a passenger, is sad and confused about whether he loves his then-live-in partner, Daphne, while another passenger, Mia, is downtrodden by family problems. To express her heartache, Mia writes messages on stones and leaves them anywhere. Allan happens to pick up several of those, prompting them to get acquainted when one day, he thinks she is about to commit suicide due to something she wrote in one of the stones.

Later, in one of their trysts, they met an old man in Paco Park who predicted that they were meant for each other and would end up together, although it would take a difficult five-year ride. Allan is torn between two loves. Although he knows that he loves Mia more, he procrastinates in his choice.

Mia leaves for Malaysia. Two years later, Allan finally breaks free from his indecision and goes to Malaysia to look for Mia only to find out that she is already engaged to someone else. It is now Mia's turn to make a choice. She chooses the other guy who loves her so much and the one she knows could help her support her family, even though she honestly knows in her heart that she still loves Allan.

Allan does not lose hope and patiently waits for Mia for another three years. He firmly believes that she will return to him as the old man had predicted. True enough, the Malaysian guy lets Mia go as he is aware of who Mia truly loves. On the very same date foreseen by the old man, Mia returns to the Philippines, sees Allan waiting for her, and embrace each other.

== Cast ==
=== Main cast ===
- John Lloyd Cruz as Alan Alvarez
- Bea Alonzo as Mia Samonte

=== Supporting cast ===
- Maricar Reyes as Daphne Recto
- Gerald Hans Isaac as Mir
- Ryan Eigenmann as Nick
- Ina Feleo as Lianne
- Ketchup Eusebio as Jona
- Tirso Cruz III as Ramon Recto
- Bembol Roco as Efren Samonte
- Maritess Joaquin as Agnes Recto
- Sylvia Sanchez as Sol Samonte
- Juan Miguel de Guzman as JM Recto
- Dianne Medina as Anette Samonte
- Sabella Bte Mustapha Kamal as Young Azrina
- Salsabil Bte Mustapha Kamil as Child Azrina
- Tan Sri Jins Shamsuddin as Mir's Grandfather
- Neil Coleta as Micoy Samonte
- Patrick Moreno as Gbert Samonte
- Elizabeth Jane Oineza as Karen Samonte
- Noel Trinidad as Ulysses
- Sid Lucero as Stephan
- Justin Cuyugan as Aries
- Irene Contreras as Nick's Sister
- Ed Bouffard as Nick's Father
- Jun Urbano as Temi
- Malou de Guzman as Cristy
- Harish as Party Guest (uncredited)

== Soundtrack ==
The film had two versions of the song, "Miss You Like Crazy" originally by Natalie Cole. The remake version was sung by Erik Santos, while the other was sung by Aiza Seguerra.

== Reception ==
=== Box office ===
According to Star Cinema, the film opened with an ₱18 million gross. In a span of five days, Miss You Like Crazy has grossed more than ₱114 million. According to Box Office Mojo, the film already grossed up to $3,183,529 (or ₱143 million) in its six weeks of theatrical run.

=== Accolades ===
Accolades received by And the Breadwinner Is...
Year	Award	Category	Recipient(s)	Result	Ref.
2011	42nd Box Office Entertainment Awards	Film Actor of the Year	John Lloyd Cruz	Won	
2011	42nd Box Office Entertainment Awards	Film Actress of the Year	Bea Alonzo	Won	
2011	27th PMPC Star Awards for Movies	Movie Actor of the Year	John Lloyd Cruz	Nominated	
2011	27th PMPC Star Awards for Movies	Movie Cinematographer of the Year	Manuel Teehankee	Nominated	
2011	27th PMPC Star Awards for Movies	Movie Musical Score of the Year	Jessie Q. Lasaten	Nominated	
2011	59th FAMAS Awards	Best Picture	Miss You Like Crazy	Nominated	
2011	59th FAMAS Awards	Best Director	Cathy Garcia-Molina	Nominated	
2011	59th FAMAS Awards	Best Actor	John Lloyd Cruz	Won	
2011	59th FAMAS Awards	Best Actress	Bea Alonzo	Nominated	
2011	59th FAMAS Awards	Best Screenplay	Miss You Like Crazy (written by Vanessa R. Valdez, Tey Clamor, and Juan Miguel Sevilla)	Nominated	
2011	59th FAMAS Awards	Best Cinematography	Manuel Teehankee	Nominated	
2011	59th FAMAS Awards	Best Editing	Marya Ignacio	Won	
2011	59th FAMAS Awards	Best Theme Song	"Miss You Like Crazy" by Erik Santos	Won	
2011	59th FAMAS Awards	Best Story	Miss You Like Crazy (written by Vanessa R. Valdez)	Nominated	
