= 2003 Metro Manila Film Festival =

Film festival edition

- Date: December 25, 2003 to January 8, 2004
- Site: Manila

Highlights
- Best Picture: Crying Ladies
- Most awards: Crying Ladies; Mano Po 2: My Home; Filipinas (5)

Television coverage
- Network: RPN

The 29th Metro Manila Film Festival was held in the Philippine International Convention Center, Pasay, Philippines, from December 25, 2003 to January 8, 2004.

Maricel Soriano and Eric Quizon were chosen the Best Actress and Best Actor respectively in the 2003 Metro Manila Film Festival for playing the eldest child roles in two different films. Soriano plays the oldest of six children in Viva Films' Filipinas, while Quizon plays the eldest son who, in keeping with Chinese tradition, hires professional mourners to weep at his father's funeral, in Unitel Pictures' Crying Ladies. Hilda Koronel, cast as a 1970s bit player whose career is on the wane in Crying Ladies, was named the Best Supporting Actress, while Victor Neri won as the Best Supporting Actor for playing the activist-middle son in Filipinas.

== Entries ==
There are two batches of films in competition, the first batch was shown from December 25, while the second batch was shown on January 1, 2004.

Title	Starring	Studio	Director	Genre
First batch
Captain Barbell	Ramon 'Bong' Revilla Jr., Ogie Alcasid, Regine Velasquez, Rufa Mae Quinto, Albert Martinez, Jeffrey Quizon, Snooky Serna, Antonio Aquitania, Sarah Geronimo	Premiere Entertainment Productions	Mac C. Alejandre	Adventure, Comedy, Fantasy, Superhero
Crying Ladies	Sharon Cuneta, Hilda Koronel, Angel Aquino, Eric Quizon, Ricky Davao, Julio Pacheco, Shamaine Buencamino, Sherry Lara, Raymond Bagatsing	Unitel Pictures	Mark Meily	Comedy, Drama
Fantastic Man	Vic Sotto, Ara Mina, Michael V., Zoren Legaspi, Leo Martinez, Danica Sotto, Alicia Mayer	Octoarts Films; M-Zet Productions	Tony Y. Reyes	Adventure, Action, Comedy, Superhero
Filipinas	Maricel Soriano, Richard Gomez, Aiko Melendez, Dawn Zulueta, Victor Neri, Wendell Ramos, Raymond Bagatsing, Andrea del Rosario, Sunshine Dizon, Tanya Garcia, Anne Curtis, Armida Siguion-Reyna, Sarah Geronimo	VIVA Films	Joel Lamangan	Drama
Homecoming	Elizabeth Oropesa, Bembol Roco, James Blanco, Alessandra de Rossi	Teamwork Productions	Gil Portes	Drama
Malikmata	Rica Peralejo, Marvin Agustin, Dingdong Dantes, Ricky Davao, Wowie de Guzman, Ana Capri, Nikki Valdez, Ms. Barbara Perez	Octoarts Films	Jose Javier Reyes	Crime, Drama, Horror
Mano Po II: My Home	Susan Roces, Christopher de Leon, Lorna Tolentino, Zsa Zsa Padilla, Kris Aquino, Judy Ann Santos, Carmina Villarroel, Jay Manalo, Cogie Domingo, Richard Gutierrez, Zoren Legaspi, Alessandra de Rossi, Karylle, Chynna Ortaleza, Angel Locsin	Regal Films	Erik Matti	Drama
Second batch
Bridal Shower	Dina Bonnevie, Cherry Pie Picache, Francine Prieto, Christian Vasquez, Rodel Velayo, Boots Anson-Roa, Gina Pareno, Alfred Vargas, Douglas Robinson, Juancho Valentino	Seiko Films	Jeffrey Jeturian	Drama, Comedy, Romance
Gagamboy	Vhong Navarro, Jay Manalo, Aubrey Miles, Long Mejia, Bearwin Meily	MAQ Productions	Erik Matti	Action, Comedy, Fantasy, Superhero

== Winners and nominees ==
=== Awards ===
Winners are listed first and highlighted in boldface.

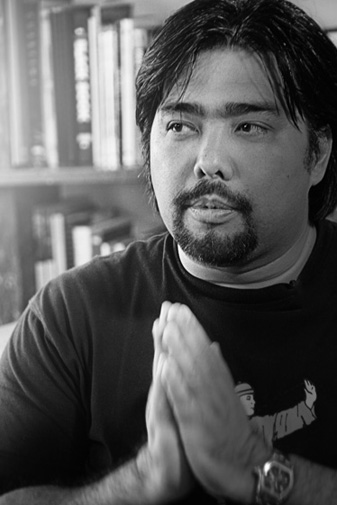
Mark Meily, Best Director winner

Best Film	Best Director
**Crying Ladies - Unitel Pictures**; Mano Po II: My Home - Regal Films (2nd Best Picture); Filipinas - VIVA Films (3rd Best Picture)	Mark Meily - Crying Ladies
Best Actor	Best Actress
**Eric Quizon – Crying Ladies**	Maricel Soriano – Filipinas
Best Supporting Actor	Best Supporting Actress
**Victor Neri – Filipinas**	Hilda Koronel – Crying Ladies
Best Cinematography	Best Production Design
**J. A. Tadena - Mano Po II: My Home**	Rodell Cruz - Mano Po II: My Home
Best Child Performer	Best Editing
**Julio Pacheco - Crying Ladies**	Vito Cajili - Malikmata
Best Original Story	Best Screenplay
**Lily Monteverde and Roy Iglesias - Mano Po II: My Home**	Roy Iglesias - Filipinas
Best Original Theme Song	Best Musical Score
**("Isang Pagtanaw") - Homecoming**	Francis Guevarra and Ferdie Marquez - Malikmata
Best Visual Effects	Best Make-up Artist
**Dodge Ledesma Roadrunner Network, Inc. - Malikmata**	Florencio Pinero, Gretta Estoesta, and Oscar Buara - Fantastic Man
Best Sound Recording	Best Float
**Mike Idioma - Malikmata**	Mano Po II: My Home - Regal Films
Most Gender-Sensitive Film
**Homecoming**
Gatpuno Antonio J. Villegas Cultural Awards
**Filipinas - VIVA Films**

=== People's Choice awards ===
Winners are listed first and highlighted in boldface.

People's Choice for Best Picture	People's Choice for Best Actor
**Mano Po II: My Home - Regal Films**	**Richard Gomez - Filipinas**
People's Choice for Best Actress
**Sharon Cuneta - Crying Ladies**

== Multiple awards ==
Awards	Film
5	Crying Ladies
5	Filipinas
5	Mano Po II: My Home
4	Malikmata
2	Homecoming

== Box Office gross ==
Only final rankings as of January 8, 2004 were released.

Entry	Gross Ticket Sales
Captain Barbell	₱ 62,064,626
Fantastic Man	₱ 55,000,000
Crying Ladies	₱ 49,000,000
Mano Po II: My Home	₱ 47,000,000
Malikmata	₱ 39,000,000
Filipinas	₱ 36,000,000
Bridal Shower	₱ 18,000,000
Gagamboy	₱ 15,000,000
Homecoming	₱ 8,000,000
TOTAL	₱ 328,812,507.77

Preceded by 2002 Metro Manila Film Festival	Metro Manila Film Festival; 2003	Succeeded by 2004 Metro Manila Film Festival
