= 2002 Metro Manila Film Festival =

Film festival edition

- Date: December 25, 2002 to January 10, 2003
- Site: Manila

Highlights
- Best Picture: Mano Po
- Most awards: Mano Po (12)

Television coverage
- Network: RPN

The 28th Metro Manila Film Festival was held in Manila, Philippines from December 25, 2002, to January 10, 2003. Two significant changes to the festival began with this edition: the festival became nationwide in scope, and its duration lasted two weeks instead of ten days.

Regal Films' Mano Po received the most number of awards out of the nine entries with a total of twelve awards, including Best Picture, Best Actor (Eddie Garcia), Best Actress (Ara Mina), Best Supporting Actress (Kris Aquino), and Best Director (Joel Lamangan). The film is also the recipient of the Gatpuno Antonio J. Villegas Cultural Awards.

== Entries ==
There are two batches of films in competition, the first batch was shown from December 25, while the second batch was shown on January 1, 2003.

Title	Starring	Studio	Director	Genre
First batch
Ang Agimat: Anting-Anting ni Lolo	Ramon Revilla Sr., Ramon "Jolo" Revilla, Ramon "Bong" Revilla Jr., Mylene Dizon, Carlos Morales, Shaina Magdayao, Nancy Castiglione, Jaime Fabregas, Pen Medina, Goyong, Karylle Padilla, Gina Alajar	Imus Productions	Augusto Salvador	Action, adventure, fantasy
Ang Alamat ng Lawin	Fernando Poe, Jr., Ina Raymundo, Cathy Vilar, Ryan Yamazaki, Franklin Cristobal, Khen Kurillo, Romy Diaz, Augusto Victa, Alex Cunanan, William Romero	FPJ Productions	Ronwaldo Reyes	Action, adventure, family, fantasy
Dekada '70	Vilma Santos, Christopher de Leon, Piolo Pascual, Marvin Agustin, Carlos Agassi, Danilo Barrios, John Wayne Sace	Star Cinema	Chito Roño	Period drama
Home Along da Riber	Dolphy, Jolina Magdangal, Zsa Zsa Padilla, Vandolph, Eddie Gutierrez, Long Mejia, James Blanco, Boy2 Quizon, Michelle Quizon, Palito	RVQ Productions	Enrico Quizon	Comedy, drama, musical
Hula Mo... Huli Ko	Rudy Fernandez, Rufa Mae Quinto	Reflection Films	Edgardo 'Boy' Vinarao	Action, comedy
Lapu-Lapu	Lito Lapid, Joyce Jimenez, Jeric Raval, Mark Lapid, Roi Vinzon, Jess Lapid Jr., Vic Vargas, Gloria Sevilla, Maria Isabel Lopez, Ian Veneracion, Julio Diaz, Bob Soler, Conrad Poe, Robert Rivera, Dinah Dominguez, Clod Robinson, Dante Rivero	Calinauan Cineworks	William G. Mayo	Historical action
Mano Po	Maricel Soriano, Richard Gomez, Kris Aquino, Ara Mina, Eddie Garcia, Gina Alajar, Boots Anson-Roa, Amy Austria, Tirso Cruz III, Cogie Domingo, Maxene Magalona, Jay Manalo, Eric Quizon	Regal Films	Joel Lamangan	Drama
Second batch
Lastikman	Vic Sotto, Donita Rose, Jeffrey Quizon, Michael V., Michelle Bayle, Ryan Eigenmann, Anne Curtis, Oyo Boy Sotto	Octoarts Films, M-Zet Productions	Tony Y. Reyes	Action, comedy, fantasy, superhero
Spirit Warriors: The Shortcut	Vhong Navarro, Jhong Hilario, Spencer Reyes, Danilo Barrios, Chris Cruz, Gloria Romero, Jaime Fabregas	MAQ Productions, Roadrunner Network, Inc.	Chito Roño	Action, adventure, fantasy, horror

== Winners and nominees ==
=== Awards ===
Winners are listed first and highlighted in boldface.

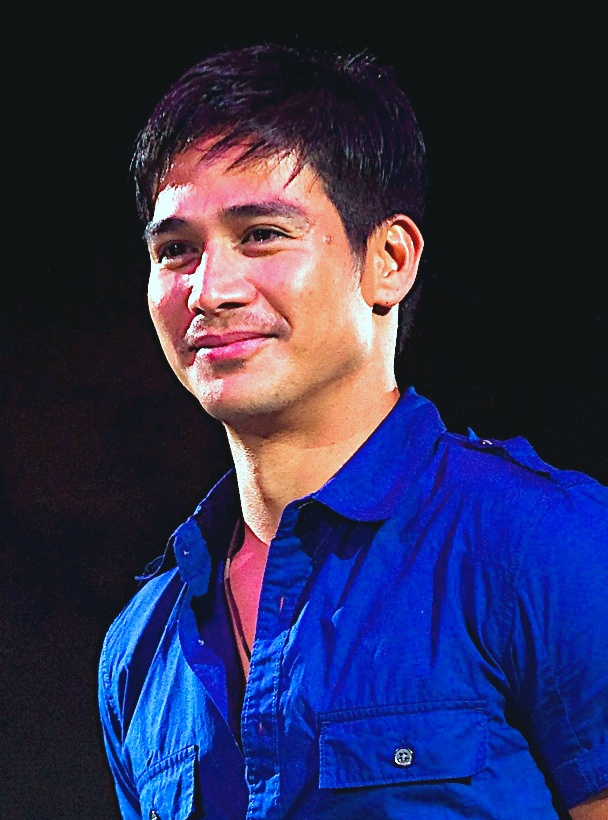
Piolo Pascual, Best Supporting Actor winner

Best Film	Best Director
**Mano Po - Regal Films**; Dekada '70 - Star Cinema (2nd Best Picture); Spirit Warriors: The Shortcut - MAQ Productions and Roadrunner Network, Inc. (3rd Best Picture); Ang Agimat: Anting-Anting ni Lolo - Imus Productions; Home Along da Riber - RVQ Productions; Ang Alamat ng Lawin - FPJ Productions; Hula Mo... Huli Ko - Reflection Films; Lastikman - Octoarts Films and M-Zet Productions; Lapu-Lapu	**Joel Lamangan - Mano Po**
Best Actor	Best Actress
**Eddie Garcia – Mano Po**; Fernando Poe, Jr. - Ang Alamat ng Lawin; Christopher de Leon - Dekada '70; Lito Lapid - Lapu-Lapu; Ramon "Bong" Revilla, Jr. - Agimat: Ang Anting-Anting ni Lolo; Dolphy - Home Along da Riber; Rudy Fernandez - Hula Mo, Huli Ko; Vic Sotto - Lastikman	**Ara Mina – Mano Po**; Maricel Soriano - Mano Po; Joyce Jimenez - Lapu-Lapu; Donita Rose - Lastikman; Vilma Santos - Dekada '70; Rufa Mae Quinto - Hula Mo, Huli Ko; Zsa Zsa Padilla - Home Along da Riber; Ina Raymundo - Ang Alamat ng Lawin
Best Supporting Actor	Best Supporting Actress
**Piolo Pascual – Dekada '70**	**Kris Aquino – Mano Po**
Best Cinematography	Best Production Design
**Leslie Garchitorena - Mano Po**	**Tatus Aldana - Mano Po**
Best Child Performer	Best Editing
**John Wayne Sace - Dekada '70**	**Tara Illenberger - Mano Po**
Best Original Story	Best Screenplay
**Lily Monteverde and Roy Iglesias - Mano Po**	**Roy Iglesias - Mano Po**
Best Original Theme Song	Best Musical Score
**("Nasaan Ka Man") - Home Alone Da Riber**	**Von de Guzman - Mano Po**
Best Visual Effects	Best Make-up Artist
**Roadrunner Network, Inc. - Spirit Warriors: The Shortcut**	**Warren Munar - Spirit Warriors: The Shortcut**
Best Sound Recording	Best Float
**Nestor Mutya - Hula Mo... Huli Ko**	**Ang Agimat: Anting-Anting ni Lolo - Imus Productions**
Gatpuno Antonio J. Villegas Cultural Awards
**Mano Po - Regal Films**

== Multiple awards ==
Awards	Film
12	Mano Po
3	Dekada '70
3	Spirit Warriors: The Shortcut

== Ceremony information ==
During the "Gabi ng Parangal" held in PICC on December 27, there were some controversies:

=== Walking out of Dekada '70 cast ===
The cast of the film Dekada '70 walked out of the award ceremonies after Lualhati Bautista failed to win the Best Story and Best Screenplay awards. Even more controversial was the decision of the judges to name the first-timer Ara Mina the Best Actress for her role in Mano Po, beating multi-awarded Vilma Santos, who was in Dekada '70.

=== Inclusion of two films ===
The producers of the films Spirit Warriors: The Shortcut and Lastikman protested the non-inclusion of the two films as official entries, prompting the Metro Manila Film Festival committee to extend the annual event. Consequently, the committee extended the film screenings to seven days to accommodate two more films which did not make it to the entries.

=== Spirit Warriors: The Shortcut issues ===
Chito Roño, director of Second Best Picture Dekada '70, was curious as to why Spirit Warriors: The Shortcut was named the Third Best Picture award if the officials disqualified it as an official entry. In the same way, the production team of Ang Agimat: Anting-Anting ni Lolo was also appalled to the decision of the jurors to give the Best Visual Effects award to Spirit Warriors: The Shortcut if they only use "mono", beating their use of the more advanced "Dolby Digital System".

== Box office gross ==
Final figures as of January 10, 2003.

Entry	Gross Ticket Sales
Mano Po	₱67,220,645.40*
Lastikman	₱59,107,245.90
Ang Agimat: Anting-Anting ni Lolo	₱46,528,274.28
Spirit Warriors: The Shortcut	₱39,941,856.68
Dekada '70	₱37,945,673.25
Home Along da Riber	₱28,143,340.90
Ang Alamat ng Lawin	₱20,453,252.95
Hula Mo... Huli Ko	₱10,334,808.45
Lapu-Lapu	₱5,686,715.90
TOTAL	₱315,361,813.71

Preceded by 2001 Metro Manila Film Festival	Metro Manila Film Festival; 2002	Succeeded by 2003 Metro Manila Film Festival
