= Filipinas (film) =

2003 family drama film by Joel Lamangan

- Official movie poster
- Directed by: Joel Lamangan
- Written by: Roy C. Iglesias
- Produced by: Vincent del Rosario III; Veronique del Rosario-Corpus; June Torrejon-Rufino
- Starring: Armida Siguion-Reyna; Maricel Soriano; Richard Gomez; Aiko Melendez; Dawn Zulueta; Victor Neri; Wendell Ramos
- Cinematography: Rolly Manuel
- Edited by: Marya Ignacio
- Music by: Jesse Lucas
- Production company: Viva Films
- Distributed by: Viva Films
- Release date: December 25, 2003
- Running time: 100 minutes
- Country: Philippines
- Language: Filipino

Filipinas (Philippines) is a 2003 Philippine family drama film directed by Joel Lamangan and written by Roy C. Iglesias. The film stars Armida Siguion-Reyna, Maricel Soriano, Richard Gomez, Aiko Melendez, Dawn Zulueta, Victor Neri and Wendell Ramos. It was one of the entries in the 2003 Metro Manila Film Festival.

== Plot ==
Florencia is the widowed matriarch of the Filipinas family and has six children: Yolanda, Samuel, Vicky, Gloria, Emman and Narciso. She also takes in Diana, a servant's daughter, as her own. In her old age, she despairs at her adult children drifting apart and fighting with each other when they reunite at their ancestral residence over the Christmas holidays.

Yolanda, the eldest daughter, is the only unmarried sibling and lives with her mother while running a sweets shop. Yolanda tracks down her boyfriend Dindo, who is newly-released from prison, but is heartbroken at learning that he is engaged to someone else. It is later revealed that Yolanda witnessed Dindo kill Rex, a friend of Samuel in self-defense, but was prevented from defending him by Samuel, who sought to cover up the fact that the unlicensed firearm used in the killing was borrowed from him by Rex, in order to obtain a work visa for the US from Rex's father. Samuel migrated with his family, but is later laid off due to a workplace scandal. Facing bankruptcy, he returns to the Philippines with his children under the guise of the holidays, but eventually confesses his true situation to his mother when his children grow impatient over their return to the US.

Gloria, a nurse, returns from Israel following a suicide bombing. She despairs at her husband Greg for solely depending on her remittances and allowing their daughter to drift away from her. After a disagreement over debt, Yolanda confronts Gloria and reminds her that she took the blame for her elopement and pregnancy with Greg, only to leave her alone to take care of their mother, but Gloria tells her that she is lashing out for her failure to live out her life with Dindo.

Vicky runs the family's onion trading business and is married to Ramesh, an Indian national. Emman is a leftwing political activist who quarrels frequently with Samuel, who holds pro-American views. Narciso, the youngest, serves in the military and hides his marriage and upcoming child with Dindi from his family. Diana and her family live with Florencia. Her father, Poldo is evicted by Florencia for abusing Diana over her ambitions to become a dancer and is subsequently debilitated after being lynched by a mob for firebombing the Filipinas residence in revenge. Florencia supports Diana, who ends up using her income from dancing to pay for Poldo's medical bills.

After spending Christmas Eve with his family, Narciso is killed during a mission, leading Dindi to suffer a miscarriage. He is buried on New Year's Eve, during which Emman stages a demonstration at his military funeral. At home, Samuel brawls with Emman over the protest. As Yolanda tries to mediate, Samuel accuses her of tolerating Emman's misdeeds, at which Yolanda lashes out at Samuel for the incident involving Dindo and storms off. As the brothers continue fighting, Florencia steps in, but is knocked down by Samuel and lands head-first on the floor, rendering her unconscious.

At the hospital, the siblings reconcile with each other while agonizing on what to do with a now-comatose Florencia as Samuel and Emman seek forgiveness at her bedside. Yolanda, now the head of the family, rallies her siblings to fight for their mother's survival, with Gloria deciding that she will help Yolanda care for their mother. Gloria stands up to Greg for his laziness, prompting him to seek work abroad. Emman goes into hiding after he is framed in a terrorist incident and joins the New People's Army. Samuel returns to the US to find work, but leaves his children behind. A year later, the family gathers around a still-comatose Florencia to celebrate her birthday, with Yolanda hoping that she wakes up seeing her children at peace again.

== Cast ==
- Armida Siguion-Reyna as Florencia Filipinas
- Maricel Soriano as Yolanda Filipinas
- Richard Gomez as Samuel Filipinas
- Aiko Melendez as Vicky Filipinas
- Dawn Zulueta as Gloria Filipinas
- Victor Neri as Emman Filipinas
- Wendell Ramos as Narciso Filipinas
- Raymond Bagatsing as Ramesh
- Daniel Fernando as Dindo
- Andrea del Rosario as Jacqueline
- Sunshine Dizon as Diana
- Tanya Garcia as Dindi
- Anne Curtis as Lyra
- Sarah Geronimo as Kathlyn
- Richard Quan as Greg
- Jose Mari Avellana as Resty
- Mikel Campos as Dylan
- Jim Pebanco as Poldo
- Tony Mabesa as Father Manalo
- Denden Patricio as Minda
- Gilleth Sandico as Leonor
- Mike Magat as Muslim Rebel
- Nanding Josef as General Malibiran
- Jon Romano as Army Soldier
- Mario Magallona as Lieutenant
- Neil Ryan Sese as Rex
- Jeon Macatangay as Joma
- Angelina Plummer as Malaya
- Gabriel Gonzales as Gabriel
- Rasha Mae Manantan as Alexis

== Reception ==
Butch Francisco of The Philippine Star gave Filipinas a positive review. He praised the film for its direction, story and performances of the stars.

== Awards ==
Year	Awards	Category	Recipient	Result	Ref.
2003	29th Metro Manila Film Festival	Best Film	Filipinas	3rd	
2003	29th Metro Manila Film Festival	Best Actor (People's Choice)	Richard Gomez	Won	
2003	29th Metro Manila Film Festival	Best Actress	Maricel Soriano	Won	
2003	29th Metro Manila Film Festival	Best Supporting Actor	Victor Neri	Won	
2003	29th Metro Manila Film Festival	Screenplay	Roy C. Iglesias	Won	
2003	29th Metro Manila Film Festival	Gatpuno Antonio J. Villegas Cultural Awards	Filipinas	Won	
2004	53rd FAMAS Awards	Best Picture	Filipinas	Nominated	
2004	53rd FAMAS Awards	Best Director	Joel Lamangan	Nominated	
2004	53rd FAMAS Awards	Best Actor	Richard Gomez	Nominated	
2004	53rd FAMAS Awards	Best Actress	Maricel Soriano	Nominated	
2004	53rd FAMAS Awards	Best Screenplay	Roy C. Iglesias	Won	
2004	53rd FAMAS Awards	Best Editing	Marya Ignacio	Won	
2004	53rd FAMAS Awards	Best Music	Jesse Lucas	Won	
2004	53rd FAMAS Awards	Best Sound	Ramon Reyes	Won	
2004	53rd FAMAS Awards	Best Visual Effects	Optima Digital	Won	
2004	22nd FAP Awards	Best Actress	Maricel Soriano	Won	
2004	28th Gawad Urian Awards	Best Actress	Maricel Soriano	Nominated	
2004	28th Gawad Urian Awards	Best Supporting Actor	Victor Neri	Nominated	
2004	28th Gawad Urian Awards	Best Music	Jesse Lucas	Nominated	
2004	15th YCC Awards	Best Performance	Maricel Soriano	Nominated	
