= So... Happy Together =

2004 Philippine film

- Directed by: Joel C. Lamangan
- Screenplay by: Ricardo Lee
- Story by: Ricardo Lee; Joel Lamangan; Lily Y. Monteverde
- Produced by: Lily Y. Monteverde
- Starring: Kris Aquino; Eric Quizon
- Cinematography: Rolly Manuel
- Edited by: Marya Ignacio
- Music by: Vincent de Jesus
- Production company: Regal Films
- Distributed by: Regal Films
- Release date: December 25, 2004 (Philippines)
- Running time: 104 minutes
- Country: Philippines
- Language: Filipino
- Box office: ₱45.1 million

So... Happy Together (a.k.a. Happy Together and Que sera sera) is a 2004 Filipino romantic comedy film about friendship, written by Ricardo Lee, directed by Joel Lamangan, and produced by Regal Films. Led by Kris Aquino and Eric Quizon in their second film together, the film's supporting stars include Tonton Gutierrez, Gloria Diaz, Cogie Domingo, Nova Villa, and Jay-R.

== Plot ==
After meeting during the 1980s at the first gay pride parade in Malate, Lianne (Kris Aquino) and Osmond (Eric Quizon) become friends. Over the next 30 years, the two do everything together: dining, shopping, discussing life, and looking for a man. The two became so inseparable that their mothers also became best friends. The Lianne and Osmond friendship lasts for decades, even beyond Lianne's becoming a mother to two teenage daughters and until Osmond's death.

== Cast ==
=== Main cast ===
- Kris Aquino as Lianne Vergara
- Eric Quizon as Osmond

=== Supporting cast ===
- Tonton Gutierrez as Erwin
- Gloria Diaz as Daisy
- Cogie Domingo as Oliver
- Nova Villa as Serapica
- Jay R as Brent
- Mark Herras as Zhander
- Jennylyn Mercado as Rowena
- Yasmien Kurdi as Serafica
- Rainier Castillo as Miles

=== Also starring ===
- Linda Gordon as Dianne
- Carlo Maceda as Gordon
- Paolo Paraiso as Randy
- Clint Pijuan
- Richard Quan as AJ
- Douglas Robinson as Hugh Dakma
- Jon Romano as Jay
- Jojo Vinzon as Violet

== Recognition ==
- 2004, Eric Quizon won Golden Screen Award at Metro Manila Film Festival Philippines for "Best Actor" for his role of Osmond.

=== Reception ===
Manila Bulletin praised the film, writing that "Happy Together is a funfilled comedy drama" and "the most unexpected and surprising movie of the season."
