= Mano Po 2: My Home =

- DVD cover
- Directed by: Erik Matti
- Screenplay by: Roy C. Iglesias
- Story by: Roy C. Iglesias; Lily Y. Monteverde
- Produced by: Lily Y. Monteverde
- Starring: Susan Roces; Kris Aquino; Zsa Zsa Padilla; Lorna Tolentino; Christopher de Leon
- Cinematography: J.A. Tadena
- Edited by: Manet A. Dayrit
- Music by: Von De Guzman
- Production company: Regal Entertainment Inc.
- Release date: December 25, 2003
- Running time: 135 minutes
- Country: Philippines
- Languages: Filipino; Hokkien

Mano Po 2: My Home (Chinese: 我的家; pinyin: Wǒ de jiā; Pe̍h-ōe-jī: Góa ê ka) is a 2003 Filipino drama film directed by Erik Matti. It is the second installment of the Mano Po film series, followed by Mano Po (2002). It stars Susan Roces in the leading role. It was also the first Mano Po film that was not directed by Joel Lamangan. It was one of the official entries to the 2003 Metro Manila Film Festival and garnered five awards.

== Plot ==
Antonio Chan, a businessman, sires children with three different women: Sol, a native Filipina who bears him Janet, Grace and Lean; LuShui, a Chinese woman who had been betrothed to Antonio during a visit to China in the 1980s, and bore him Rose; and Belinda, a Chinese-Filipina who bore him Ingrid and Erickson. Sol reluctantly allows the two other women to live in their household, but her relationship with Antonio deteriorates. After Sol gives birth to Lean, Antonio accuses her of being infidelity in producing the child while he was in China, which prompts her to move out with Lean. As her other daughters follow, the eldest Janet is run over. Sol tries to help, but Antonio banishes her from the household and takes custody of their daughters, who are subsequently raised by Belinda. Sol then raises Lean alone in the province, Antonio having cuts ties with them and refusing to recognize Lean as his son. LuShui eventually moves out too, leaving Belinda as Antonio's only companion over the years.

In the present, Antonio is killed in a robbery. His ensuing wake and funeral leads to the gathering of his widows and children. Belinda, as Antonio's last partner, tries to dominate the proceedings, stirring resistance from both LuShui and Sol, who have become friends. Belinda also tries to monopolize Antonio's estate, going as far as to evict LuShui from her residence and bar Lean from attending the funeral. The growing tensions force Belinda's secretly pregnant daughter Ingrid to move out, leaving behind his brother Erickson, an anxious young man dominated by their mother, who disapproves of his Filipina girlfriend, Yna.

After Erickson allows Lean, as Antonio's first-born son, to become chief mourner, Belinda resolves to prevent Antonio's other children from receiving their inheritance. Her insinuations lead to her brother, Johnson, since married to a now-paralyzed Janet, to frame Sol for Antonio's murder, leading to her arrest by corrupt policemen. A suspicious Grace, sympathetic to Sol and LuShui, investigates and discovers the truth, leading to Johnson and his accomplices' arrest and Sol's release. Janet, who grew up hating Sol, leaves Johnson and reconciles with her mother as Belinda denies involvement and narrowly avoids being charged herself.

Grace tells Lean and Sol that while investigating, she learned from a friend of Antonio's that he had finally acknowledged Lean as his son after running a DNA test, and had revised his will to give part of his estate to Lean to atone for his absence. Lean forgives Antonio after reading an emotional letter addressed to him by his father shortly before the latter’s death. As Sol and LuShui's families celebrate New Year's Eve together, Erickson, distressed by the family conflict and by Belinda threatening Yna, fatally shoots himself in front of his mother, plunging Belinda into depression. She is later comforted by Sol and LuShui.

A year later, Ingrid returns with Antonio's grandchild, while Sol, LuShui, and a contrite Belinda celebrate the Chinese New Year together with their now-reconciled families.

== Cast ==
- Susan Roces as Sol Parco-Chan
- Kris Aquino as young Sol Parco-Chan
- Christopher de Leon as Antonio Chan
- Lorna Tolentino as Belinda Keh
- Zsa Zsa Padilla as LuShui Chou
- Judy Ann Santos as Grace Parco Chan
- Carmina Villarroel as Janet Chan-Cua
- Jay Manalo as Johnson Keh-Cua
- Cogie Domingo as Lean Parco Chan
- Richard Gutierrez as Erickson Keh-Chan
- Alessandra De Rossi as Ingrid Keh-Chan
- Karylle as Rose Chou Chan
- Chynna Ortaleza as Yna
- Angel Locsin as Melissa Ching
- Zoren Legaspi as Rodrigo
- Efren Reyes Jr. as Madiang
- Crispin Pineda as Fidel
- Raquel Villavicencio as Atty. Chiongbian
- Orestes Ojeda as Pio Andres
- Val Victa as Atty. Lester Que

== Production ==
While Susan Roces was the original choice to play the first wife, the Filipina Sol, the role of the third wife was mired in controversy. The contested role, the Chinese mestiza Belinda, was originally offered to Dina Bonnevie. However, Lolit Solis, manager to both Christopher de Leon and Lorna Tolentino, threatened to pull out her talents if the role was not given to Tolentino. The role was ultimately given to Tolentino; Bonnevie, who would have played the role of the second wife, the Chinese immigrant LuShui, bowed out of the production citing that she would not fit the role of a pure Chinese character. Zsa Zsa Padilla replaced Bonnevie in the film.

== Awards ==
Year	Award-Giving Body	Category	Recipient	Result
2003	Metro Manila Film Festival	2nd Best Picture	Mano Po 2: My Home	Won
2003	Metro Manila Film Festival	Best Production Design	Rodell Cruz	Won
2003	Metro Manila Film Festival	Cinematography	J.A. Tadena	Won
2003	Metro Manila Film Festival	Best Original Story	Lily Monteverde and Roy Iglesias	Won
2003	Metro Manila Film Festival	Best Float	Mano Po 2: My Home	Won
2004	Luna Awards	Best Cinematography	J.A. Tadena	Won
2004	Luna Awards	Best Production Design	Rodell Cruz	Won
2004	Golden Screen Awards	Best Supporting Actress	Judy Ann Santos	Won

== See also ==
- Mano Po (Filipino film series)
- Mano Po
- Mano Po III: My Love
- Ako Legal Wife: Mano Po 4?
- Mano Po 5: Gua Ai Di
- Bahay Kubo: A Pinoy Mano Po!
- Mano Po 6: A Mother's Love
- Mano Po 7: Chinoy
