= Mano Po III: My Love =

2004 Filipino romantic drama film

- Official movie poster on DVD cover
- Directed by: Joel Lamangan
- Screenplay by: Roy C. Iglesias
- Story by: Roy C. Iglesias; Joel Lamangan; Lily Y. Monteverde
- Produced by: Lily Y. Monteverde; Douglas Quijano
- Starring: Vilma Santos; Christopher de Leon; Jay Manalo
- Cinematography: Rolly Manuel
- Edited by: Tara Illenberger
- Music by: Jesse Lucas
- Production company: MAQ Productions
- Distributed by: Regal Entertainment Inc.
- Release date: December 25, 2004
- Running time: 111 minutes
- Country: Philippines
- Language: Filipino
- Box office: ₱35.3 million

Mano Po III: My Love (simplified Chinese: 我的爱; traditional Chinese: 我的愛; pinyin: Wǒ de ài) is a 2004 Filipino romantic drama film directed by Joel Lamangan and the third installment of the Mano Po film series, following the success of Mano Po and Mano Po 2: My Home. Produced by Regal Entertainment and MAQ Productions, Mano Po III stars Vilma Santos in the leading role.

== Plot ==
Anti-crime crusader Lilia Chiong Yang seems to have everything a woman could want and need: a husband, Paul, who pampers her; children whom any parent would be proud of; and the respect and admiration of the most powerful people in the country. But just as Lilia prepares for her 25th wedding anniversary celebration, a chance encounter in Thailand with her first love Michael throws Lilia's life into chaos. So begins the resumption of a relationship that threatens to unravel the delicate threads connecting Lilia to the other people in her life.

In a flashback, Lilia, Paul and Michael are colleagues during the student movement of the early 1970s, with Paul and Michael comforting Lilia when she runs away from her father, Melencio after an argument and learning that she was adopted and encouraging her to go home. The declaration of Martial Law forces them to go low, with Michael going into hiding, unaware that he had impregnated Lilia. Paul, who also had feelings for Lilia, took advantage of the situation by being there for her throughout her struggles and by preventing Michael's letters to Lilia from reaching Lilia.

In the present, the discovery of this revelation and the resumption of Michael and Lilia's relationship lead to tensions between Lilia and her family and a heated argument with Paul, but it does not prevent the latter from letting their eldest child Stephen, who is actually Michael's lovechild, from reconnecting with his biological father and eventually moving in with him. Michael, who is frustrated over the unfairness of their circumstances, calls on Lilia to elope together, but Lilia is reluctant to do so. Paul, who feels guilt for sabotaging Lilia and Michael’s romance, apologizes for his treatment of her, but is afterwards shot in an ambush by people Lilia had crossed in her advocacy. Arriving at Paul's deathbed, Michael thanks him for taking care of Lilia while Paul, on his dying breath, entrusts Lilia to Michael's care.

Lilia, who is only comforted by her father, is initially shunned by her children and by Paul's family for his death but is later reconciled with them. Michael tries to resume their romance with Lilia, but the latter refuses, reminding him how he encouraged her to go back to her family and that her decision to go with Paul the night they were supposed to elope meant that Michael was not the one killed in the ambush. After telling Michael that she will still be there as a friend, they tearfully embrace and part ways.

== Cast ==
- Vilma Santos as Lilia Chiong-Yang
- Christopher de Leon as Michael Lim
- Jay Manalo as Paul Yang
- Patrick Garcia as Stephen Yang
- Angelica Panganiban as young Lilia Chiong
- Carlo Aquino as young Michael Lim
- John Prats as young Paul Yang
- Angel Locsin as Eliza Yang
- Sheryl Cruz as Bernadette Yang
- Karylle as Judith Yang
- Dennis Trillo as Sigmond Lee
- Jean Garcia as Freida Lee
- Eddie Garcia as Melencio Chiong
- Boots Anson-Roa as Maria Yang
- Jim Pebanco as Nememcio
- Mark Leviste as Paul Yang's executive assistant
- Tim Yap as Chinese opera director

== Soundtrack ==
The song's theme song is "Pagbigyan ang Puso" performed by Karylle and Jerome John Hughes (version of Tim Hwang's Saranghamnida (released in 2003 from his debut album "First Tim"). The song was composed by former Neocolours frontman Ito Rapadas. Its music video was shown upon the closing credits of the movie.

== Awards ==
Year	Award-Giving Body	Category	Recipient	Result
2004	Metro Manila Film Festival	Best Picture	Mano Po III: My Love	Won
2004	Metro Manila Film Festival	Best Actor	Christopher de Leon	Won
2004	Metro Manila Film Festival	Best Actress	Vilma Santos	Won
2004	Metro Manila Film Festival	Best Production Design	Rodell Cruz	Won
2004	Metro Manila Film Festival	Best Original Theme Song	Pagbigyan ang Puso Ko	Won
2004	Metro Manila Film Festival	Best Float	Mano Po III: My Love	Won

== See also ==
- Mano Po (Filipino film series)
- Mano Po
- Mano Po 2
- Ako Legal Wife: Mano Po 4?
- Mano Po 5: Gua Ai Di
- Bahay Kubo: A Pinoy Mano Po!
- Mano Po 6: A Mother's Love
- Mano Po 7: Tsinoy
