= Super Inday and the Golden Bibe =

Super Inday and the Golden Bibe may refer to:

- Super Inday and the Golden Bibe (1988 film), a Filipino superhero comedy film
- Super Inday and the Golden Bibe (2010 film), a remake of the above
