= Roy C. Iglesias =

Filipino film writer and director

- Occupations: Film writer and director
- Years active: 1976–present

Roy C. Iglesias is a Filipino film writer and director. His most notable works include, among others, the 1976 film Ganito Kami Noon... Paano Kayo Ngayon?, which was directed by National Artist of the Philippines, Eddie Romero, numerous entries in Regal Entertainment's Mano Po anthology film series and historical dramas Yamashita: The Tiger's Treasure, Baler and Manila Kingpin: The Asiong Salonga Story.

Scripts penned by Iglesias have seen him nominated to and winning most of the established Film awards in the Philippines, specifically the Filipino Academy of Movie Arts and Sciences Awards, the Luna Awards (awarded by the Film Academy of the Philippines and often referred to as the FAP awards), the Gawad Urian, Philippine Movie Press Club Star Awards, Young Critics Circle Award and the Metro Manila Film Festival. He was also nominated twice for the EnPress Golden Screen Award, although neither nomination resulted in a win.

Iglesias is a graduate of the University of the City of Manila.

== Filmography ==
=== Film ===
- Ganito Kami Noon, Paano Kayo Ngayon? (1976)
- Experience (1984)
- 3 Mukha ng Pag-ibig (segment "Ang Silid", 1989)
- Biktima (1990)
- Sa Kabila ng Lahat (1991)
- Eskapo (co-writer, 1995)
- Silakbo (1995)
- Dahas (1995)
- Ganti ng Puso (1996)
- Akin ang Puri (1996)
- Istokwa (1996)
- Bakit May Kahapon Pa? (1996)
- Nasaan ang Puso (1997)
- Babae sa Bintana (1998)
- Hinahanap-hanap Kita (1999)
- Warat, Bibigay Ka Ba? (1999)
- Linlang (1999)
- Spirit Warriors (co-writer, 2000)
- Hubog (2001)
- Yamashita: The Tiger's Treasure (2001)
- Mano Po (2002)
- Spirit Warriors: The Shortcut (co-writer, 2003)
- Nympha (2003)
- Xerex (2003)
- Bugbog Sarado (2003)
- Filipinas (2003)
- Mano Po 2: My Home (2003)
- Kulimlim (2004)
- Feng Shui (co-writer, 2004)
- Mano Po III: My Love (2004)
- Sigaw (writer, 2004)
- Ako Legal Wife: Mano Po 4? (2005)
- Pacquiao: The Movie (2006)
- Desperadas (2007)
- Baler (2008)
- Desperadas 2 (2008)
- Mano Po 6: A Mother's Love (2009)
- Bulong (co-writer, 2011)
- Manila Kingpin: The Asiong Salonga Story (co-writer, 2011)
- The Healing (2012)
- Feng Shui 2 (co-writer, 2014)
- Shake, Rattle and Roll Fourteen: The Invasion (segment: "Unwanted", 2012)
- The Blood Brothers (2024)

== Television ==
GMA Network

- Kung Mawawala Ka (2002–2003)
- Mukha (2005)
- Ganti (2005)
- Duyan (2006)
- Linlang (2006)
- Dangal (2006)
- Sinasamba Kita (2007)
- Pati Ba Pintig ng Puso (2007)
- My Only Love (2007–2008)
- Saan Darating ang Umaga? (2008–2009)
- Obra (Episode: "Boksingera", 2008)
- Forever (2013)
- The Half Sisters (2014–2016)
- Yagit (2014–2015)
- More Than Words (2014–2015)
- Once Upon A Kiss (2015)
- Second Chances (2015)
- Kailan Ba Tama ang Mali? (2015)
- Pari 'Koy (2015)
- InstaDad (2015)
- Let the Love Begin (2015)
- Healing Hearts (2015)
- The Rich Man's Daughter (2015)
- My Mother's Secret (2015)
- Buena Familia (2015–2016)
- Beautiful Strangers (2015)
- My Faithful Husband (2015)
- Marimar (2015–2016)
- Destiny Rose (2015–2016)
- Little Nanay (2015–2016)
- Because of You (2015–2016)
- Wish I May (2016)
- That's My Amboy (2016)
- Hanggang Makita Kang Muli (2016)
- The Millionaire's Wife (2016)
- Poor Señorita (2016)
- Once Again (2016)
- Juan Happy Love Story (2016)
- Magkaibang Mundo (2016)
- Sa Piling Ni Nanay (2016–2017)
- Sinungaling Mong Puso (2016)
- Encantadia (2016–2017)
- Someone to Watch Over Me (2016–2017)
- Oh, My Mama! (2016)
- Alyas Robin Hood (2016–2017)
- Hahamakin ang Lahat (2016–2017)
- Ika-6 na Utos (2016–2018)
- Meant To Be (2017)
- Pinulot Ka Lang Sa Lupa (2017)
- Legally Blind (2017)
- Destined to be Yours (2017)
- Mulawin vs. Ravena (2017)
- My Love from the Star (2017)
- I Heart Davao (2017)
- Impostora (2017–2018)
- Haplos (2017–2018)
- My Korean Jagiya (2017–2018)
- Super Ma'am (2017–2018)
- Kambal, Karibal (2017–2018)
- The One That Got Away (2018)
- Sherlock Jr. (2018)
- The Stepdaughters (2018)
- Hindi Ko Kayang Iwan Ka (2018)
- Contessa (2018)
- The Cure (2018)
- Kapag Nahati ang Puso (2018)
- Victor Magtanggol (2018)
- Onanay (2018–2019)
- My Special Tatay (2018–2019)
- Ika-5 Utos (2018–2019)
- Pamilya Roces (2018)
- Asawa Ko, Karibal Ko (2018–2019)
- Cain at Abel (2018–2019)

== Stage play ==
- Rama at Sita (1999)

== Awards ==
=== Metro Manila Film Festival ===
Year	Category	Work	Result
1976	Best Screenplay	Ganito Kami Noon, Paano Kayo Ngayon	Won
1997	Best Screenplay	Nasaan ang Puso	Won
2001	Best Screenplay (with Chito Rono)	Yamashita: The Tiger's Treasure	Won
2001	Best Original Story (with Chito Rono and Roselle Monteverde-Teo)	Yamashita: The Tiger's Treasure	Won
2002	Best Screenplay	Mano Po	Won
2002	Best Original Story (with Lily Monteverde)	Mano Po	Won
2003	Best Original Story (with Lily Monteverde)	Mano Po 2: My Home	Won
2003	Best Screenplay	Filipinas	Won
2008	Best Screenplay	Baler	Won
2009	Best Screenplay	Mano Po 6: A Mother's Love	Won
2011	Best Screenplay	Manila Kingpin: The Asiong Salonga Story	Won
