= Mano Po 6: A Mother's Love =

2009 Filipino drama film

- Official movie poster
- Directed by: Joel C. Lamangan
- Screenplay by: Roy Iglesias
- Story by: Lily Y. Monteverde; Roy Iglesias
- Produced by: Lily Y. Monteverde
- Starring: Sharon Cuneta
- Cinematography: Mo Zee
- Edited by: Tara Illenberger
- Music by: Von de Guzman
- Production companies: Regal Entertainment; Regal Multimedia
- Distributed by: Regal Films
- Release date: December 25, 2009
- Running time: 111 minutes
- Country: Philippines
- Language: Filipino
- Budget: ₱90 million
- Box office: ₱42 million (Official 2009 MMFF run) ₱44 million (Official Domestic run)

Mano Po 6: A Mother's Love (simplified Chinese: 母爱; traditional Chinese: 母愛; pinyin: Mǔ'ài; Pe̍h-ōe-jī: Bú-ài) is a 2009 Filipino drama film and the sixth installment of the Mano Po franchise, following Mano Po 5: Gua Ai Di in 2006. Produced by Regal Entertainment, Mano Po 6 marks the first and so far, only appearance of Sharon Cuneta in a Regal Entertainment film outside of her home studios Viva Films and Star Cinema. It co-stars Zsa Zsa Padilla (in her third Mano Po role), Christopher De Leon, Boots Anson-Roa (fourth appearance in the Mano Po series), Kris Aquino (in her third Mano Po role), Dennis Trillo (in another Mano Po appearance, last seen in Mano Po III: My Love), Heart Evangelista, and Ciara Sotto. This is Cuneta's reunion movie with her co-stars Christopher de Leon and Zsa Zsa Padilla from Madrasta. Joel Lamangan, who had last worked with Cuneta in Walang Kapalit directed his fifth Mano Po role.

It is also an entry to the 2009 Metro Manila Film Festival during its theater run from December 25, 2009, to January 2010.

== Plot ==
In the 1950s, Jin Feng arrives in the Philippines as an unaccompanied refugee from communist China and later marries a Filipino. Jin Feng is discriminated against by the local Chinese community because of her unknown origins, while her daughter, Melinda is also discriminated against for being a half-Chinese, half-Filipina. Melinda later marries a rich Filipino-Chinese named Alfonso Uy, much to the chagrin of the latter's family, particularly his sister Olive, who looks down at Melinda. Melinda moves in with his in-laws, but after Alfonso dies, she is openly excluded by them as they assume full custody of her children, with the exception of her eldest daughter Carol, who chooses to be with her mother. They also raise her other daughter Stephanie to resent her mother, claiming that she had abandoned them, which is reinforced when Melinda stops appearing for a long time after having been framed by the Uys and imprisoned. Despite being brought low by Jin Feng's death, her separation from her other children and Stephanie's resentment at her, Melinda eventually recovers and enters into entrepreneurship with the help of her friend Vivienne.

In the present, Melinda is a successful businesswoman who tries to reconcile with Stephanie and secretly meets with her two youngest children Audrey and Walden, who remain in the Uys' custody. Meanwhile, Carol begins resenting her mother for focusing too much on Stephanie despite her sister's open hatred of her. After entering into an abusive relationship with her disreputable boyfriend Gino, Carol lashes out at Melinda for neglecting her, which Melinda acknowledges and promises to make amends. In revenge for Gino battering Carol, Melinda arranges for him to be framed and imprisoned for drugs charges.

Melinda and Carol learn that the Uys, particularly Olive, are arranging for Stephanie to marry Daniel, Carol's ex-boyfriend who is a swindler and leader of a criminal syndicate. The two warn Stephanie about his fiancee's record, but Stephanie dismisses their warnings as a ploy. This changes when Daniel is arrested by police and Stephanie listens to a recording of a conversation between Daniel and Melinda given by the latter, in which Daniel brags about his plans to siphon the Uys' wealth for his criminal enterprise. Stunned, Stephanie breaks off her engagement with Daniel, chastises Olive and the Uys for their immorality and moves out with her siblings to Melinda, who accepts them into her life.

Daniel's criminal bosses arrange for Gino to be released from prison in exchange for killing Stephanie, who had received monetary gifts from Daniel which she later realized was part of Daniel's money laundering scheme. Melinda learns of the plot and is injured after shielding her daughter as Gino shoots at them before escaping. Melinda narrowly survives the attack, while Gino is later found murdered, with Melinda hinting that he was killed to prevent him from speaking out. Daniel later implicates Olive in his criminal activity, but the latter commits suicide before police can arrest her.

A remorseful Stephanie asks for forgiveness from Melinda, which the latter grants. The film ends with Melinda and her whole family going to Jin Feng's home village in China to open an orphanage in her memory.

== Cast ==
=== Main cast ===
- Sharon Cuneta as Melinda Uy

=== Supporting cast ===
- Zsa Zsa Padilla as Olive Uy
- Boots Anson-Roa as Jin Feng
- Christopher de Leon as Alfonso Uy
- Heart Evangelista as Stephanie Uy
- Ciara Sotto as Carol Uy
- Dennis Trillo as Daniel Chan
- Kris Aquino as Vivienne
- Zoren Legaspi as Alberto
- Ryan Eigenmann as Gino
- Niña Jose as Erika
- Arthur Solinap as Emil
- Nicole Uysiuseng as Audrey Uy
- John Manalo as Walden Uy

=== Special Participation ===
- Glaiza de Castro as young Melinda
- JC de Vera as young Alfonso
- Eda Nolan as teen Jin Feng
- Dominic Roco as Jin Feng's husband

== 35th Metro Manila Film Festival Awards ==
Year	Category	Recipient	Result
2009	Best Actress	Sharon Cuneta	Won
2009	Best Supporting Actress	Heart Evangelista	Won
2009	Best Screenplay	Roy Iglesias	Won
2009	Best Director	Joel Lamangan	Won
2009	Best Musical Score	Von de Guzman	Won
2009	Most Gender-Sensitive Film	Heart Evangelista	Won
2009	Gatpuno Antonio J. Villegas Cultural Awards	Mano Po 6: A Mother's Love	Won

== See also ==
- Mano Po (Filipino film series)
- Mano Po
- Mano Po 2
- Mano Po III: My Love
- Ako Legal Wife
- Mano Po 5: Gua Ai Di
- Bahay Kubo: A Pinoy Mano Po!
- Mano Po 7: Tsinoy
