= Metro Manila Film Festival Award for Best Picture =

Philippine movie award

- Awarded for: Best Picture
- Country: Philippines
- Presented by: MMDA
- First award: 1975
- Currently held by: I'mPerfect (2025)
- Website: www.mmda.gov.ph/mmff/

The Metro Manila Film Festival Award for Best Picture (previously known as Dangal ng Bagong Lipunan) is an award presented annually by the Metropolitan Manila Development Authority (MMDA). It was first awarded at the 1st Metropolitan Film Festival ceremony, held in 1975; the film Diligin Mo ng Hamog ang Uhaw na Lupa starring Joseph Estrada received the award and it is given in honor of the film that has delivered an outstanding creation of the film, including directing, acting, music composing, writing, editing and other efforts put forth into a film. The category was first named "Best Film" before changing it to "Best Picture" in 2007. Currently, nominees and winners are determined by Executive Committees, headed by the Metropolitan Manila Development Authority Chairman and key members of the film industry.

== Winners and nominees ==
Key	Explanation
‡	Indicates the winning film/picture

=== 1970s ===
Year	Film	Production company(ies)	Producer(s)	Ref
1975 (1st)	Diligin Mo ng Hamog ang Uhaw na Lupa‡	JE Production, Inc	Joseph Ejercito	
1975 (1st)	Batu-Bato sa Langit (3rd)	NV Productions		
1976 (2nd)	Ganito Kami Noon, Paano Kayo Ngayon‡	Hemisphere	Dennis Juban	
1976 (2nd)	Minsa'y Isang Gamu-gamo	Premiere Productions	Digna Santiago	
1977 (3rd)	Burlesk Queen‡	Ian Films	Romy Ching	
1978 (4th)	Atsay‡	Ian Films	Romy Ching	
1979 (5th)	Kasal-kasalan, Bahay-bahayan‡	HPS Films	Hermogenes P. Santiago	
1979 (5th)	Ina ka ng Anak Mo		Lourdes A. Marquez (executive producer)	

=== 1980s ===
Year	Film	Production Company(ies)	Producer(s)	Ref
1980 (6th)	Taga sa Panahon‡			
1980 (6th)	Brutal			
1980 (6th)	Langis sa Tubig			
1981 (7th)	Kisapmata‡	Bancom Productions	Ronaldo S. Atienza	
1981 (7th)	Ang Babae Sa Ulog			
1982 (8th)	Himala‡	Experimental Cinema of the Philippines (1982)	Bibsy N. Carballo and Charo Santos-Concio	
1982 (8th)	Moral			
1982 (8th)	Haplos			
1983 (9th)	Karnal‡	Cine Suerte Films (1983)	Ben Yalung	
1983 (9th)	Bago Kumalat ang Kamandag			
1983 (9th)	Hot Property			
1984 (10th)	Bulaklak sa City Jail‡	Cherubim Films	Archie Cobarrubias and Cherry Cobarrubias	
1984 (10th)	Alapaap (2nd)			
1984 (10th)	Shake, Rattle & Roll (3rd)			
1984 (10th)	Misteryo sa Tuwa			
1984 (10th)	Atsay Liller Buti Nga Sa'yo			
1984 (10th)	Idol			
1984 (10th)	Muntinlupa			
1984 (10th)	Bukas... May Pangarap			
1984 (10th)	Ang Panday IV: Ika-Apat na Aklat			
1985 (11th)	Paradise Inn‡	Amazaldy Film Productions	Amado Tan	
1985 (11th)	Moises Padilla Story: The Missing Chapter (2nd)	Triple A Films		
1985 (11th)	Ano Ang Kulay Ng Mukha ng Diyos? (3rd)	Lea Productions		
1986 (12th)	Halimaw sa Banga (3rd) (Note: Only the 3rd "Best Picture" was announced.)	NCV Productions		
1986 (12th)	Bagets Gang			
1986 (12th)	Payaso			
1987 (13th)	Olongapo, The Great American Dream‡			
1987 (13th)	The Untold Story of Melanie Marquez (2nd)			
1987 (13th)	Anak Badjao (3rd)			
1987 (13th)	Huwag Mong Buhayin Ang Patay	Seiko Films		
1987 (13th)	Action Is not Missing			
1987 (13th)	1 + 1 = 12 + 1	Regal Films		
1988 (14th)	Patrolman‡			
1988 (14th)	Celestina Sanchez, Alyas Bubbles/ Enforcer: Ativan Gang (2nd)			
1988 (14th)	Magkano ang iyong dangal (3rd)			
1989 (15th)	Imortal‡	VIVA Films	Vic del Rosario	
1989 (15th)	Ang Bukas ay Akin	Seiko Films		

=== 1990s ===
Year	Film	Production Company(ies)	Producer(s)	Ref
1990 (16th)	Andrea, Paano Ba ang Maging Isang Ina?‡	MRN Film International	Mely Nicandro	
1990 (16th)	Ama, Bakit Mo Ako Pinabayaan? (2nd)			
1990 (16th)	Tumakbo Ka... Hanggang May Lupa (3rd)			
1990 (16th)	Espadang Patpat			
1991 (17th)	Ang Totoong Buhay ni Pacita M.‡	MRN Film International	Mely Nicandro	
1991 (17th)	Juan Tamad at Mister Shooli sa Mongolian Barbeque (The Movie) (2nd)		FLT Films International	
1991 (17th)	Darna (3rd)	VIVA Films		
1991 (17th)	Contreras Gang	Moviestars Production		
1991 (17th)	Magdalena S. Palacol Story			
1992 (18th)	Andres Manambit: Angkan ng Matatapang‡			
1992 (18th)	Takbo Talon Tili! (2nd)	Seiko Films		
1992 (18th)	Engkanto (3rd)			
1992 (18th)	Bakit Labis Kitang Mahal	OctoArts Films		
1992 (18th)	Shake, Rattle & Roll IV	Regal Films		
1992 (18th)	Okey Ka Fairy Ko!	Regal Films and M-Zet Productions		
1993 (19th)	Kung Mawawala Ka Pa‡	Reyna Films		
1993 (19th)	May Minamahal (2nd)	Star Cinema	Charo Santos-Concio and Lily Y. Monteverde	
1993 (19th)	Doring Dorobo: Hagupit ng Batas (3rd)	LEA Productions		
1993 (19th)	Gaano Kita Kamahal	Pioneer Films		
1993 (19th)	Pusoy Dos	VIVA Films		
1993 (19th)	Inay	OWNI Films		
1994 (20th)	None (Note: Most of the major awards were not given including the "Best Picture" category.)			
1995 (21st)	Muling Umawit ang Puso‡	VIVA Films	Vic del Rosario Jr	
1995 (21st)	Dahas			
1996 (22nd)	Magic Temple‡	Malou Santos, Charo Santos-Concio, and Trina Dayrit	Star Cinema	
1996 (22nd)	Emong Salvacion: Humanda Ka...Oras Mo Na! (2nd)		Regal Films	
1996 (22nd)	Trudis Liit (3rd)		RJ Films	
1997 (23rd)	Nasaan ang Puso?‡		MaQ Productions	
1997 (23rd)	Babae (2nd)		GEM	
1997 (23rd)	Magic Kingdom (3rd)		Viva Films and Neo Films	
1998 (24th)	José Rizal‡	GMA Films	Gilberto Duavit Jr., Felipe Gozon, and Menardo Jimenez	
1998 (24th)	Babae sa Bintana (2nd)	Regal Films		
1998 (24th)	Puso ng Pasko (3rd)	Star Cinema		
1999 (25th)	Muro Ami‡	GMA Films	Butch Jimenez, Jimmy Duavit, Marilou Diaz-Abaya	
1999 (25th)	Bulaklak ng Maynila (2nd)	VIVA Films		
1999 (25th)	Sa Piling ng mga Aswang (3rd)	Regal Films		

=== 2000s ===
Year	Film	Production Company(ies)	Producer(s)	Ref
2000 (26th)	Tanging Yaman‡	Star Cinema	Star Cinema	
2000 (26th)	Deathrow (2nd)	GMA Films		
2000 (26th)	Sugatang Puso (3rd)	Regal Films		
2001 (27th)	Yamashita: The Tiger's Treasure‡	Regal Films	Douglas Quijano, Sherida Monteverde, and Allan Escaño	
2001 (27th)	Bagong Buwan (2nd)	Star Cinema	Charo Santos-Concio, Malou N. Santos and Marilou Diaz-Abaya	
2001 (27th)	Hubog (3rd)	Good Harvest Productions		
2002 (28th)	Mano Po‡	Regal Films	Roselle Monteverde-Teo	
2002 (28th)	Dekada ’70 (2nd)	Star Cinema	Tess V. Fuentes	
2002 (28th)	Spirit Warriors: The Shortcut (3rd)	MAQ Productions, Regal Films	Sherida Monteverde, Douglas Quijano, Allan Escaño, and Christopher Rodriguez	
2003 (29th)	Crying Ladies‡	Unitel Pictures	Vincent Nebrida, Jun Reyes and Tony Gloria	
2003 (29th)	Mano Po 2: My Home (2nd)	Regal Films	Lily Y. Monteverde	
2003 (29th)	Filipinas (3rd)			
2004 (30th)	Mano Po III: My Love‡	Regal Films	Roselle Monteverde-Teo	
2004 (30th)	Panaghoy sa Suba (2nd)	CM Films Inc.	Cesar Montano	
2004 (30th)	Aishite Imasu 1941: Mahal Kita (3rd)	Regal Films and BASFILM Productions		
2005 (31st)	Blue Moon‡	Regal Films	Roselle Monteverde-Teo	
2005 (31st)	Exodus: Tales from the Enchanted Kingdom (2nd)	Imus Productions and Media Asia Distribution	Imus Productions and Reality Entertainment	
2005 (31st)	Kutob (3rd)	Canary Films		
2006 (32nd)	Enteng Kabisote 3: Okay Ka, Fairy Ko: The Legend Goes On and On and On‡	OctoArts Films and M-Zet Productions	Orly R. Ilacad	
2006 (32nd)	Kasal, Kasali, Kasalo (2nd)	Star Cinema		
2006 (32nd)	Shake, Rattle & Roll 8 (3rd)	Regal Films	Roselle Monteverde-Teo	
2007 (33rd)	Resiklo‡	Imus Productions and Media Asia Films	Marlon Bautista and Dave Hukom	
2007 (33rd)	Sakal, Sakali, Saklolo (2nd)	Star Cinema		
2007 (33rd)	Enteng Kabisote 4: Okay Ka Fairy Ko...The Beginning of the Legend (3rd)	OctoArts Films & MZet Productions	Orly R. Ilacad, Marvic Sotto	
2008 (34th)	Baler‡	VIVA Films	Vicente Del Rosario III, Veronique Del Rosario	
2008 (34th)	Ang Tanging Ina N'yong Lahat (2nd)	Star Cinema	Tess V. Fuentes and Malou Santos	
2008 (34th)	Iskul Bukol 20 Years After (3rd)	Octoarts Films, M-Zet Productions and APT Entertainment		
2009 (35th)	Ang Panday‡	GMA Films	Annette Gozon-Abrogar, Jose Mari Abacan, and Marlon Bautista	
2009 (35th)	I Love You, Goodbye (2nd)	Star Cinema	Malou Santos	
2009 (35th)	Ang Darling Kong Aswang (3rd)	OctoArts Films, APT Entertainment and M-Zet Productions	Orly R. Ilacad, Antonio P. Tuviera and Marvic Sotto	

=== 2010s ===
Year	Film	Production Company(ies)	Producer(s)	Ref
2010 (36th)	Ang Tanging Ina Mo (Last na 'To!)‡	Star Cinema	Charo Santos-Concio and Malou Santos	
2010 (36th)	Rosario (2nd)	Cinemabuhay International and Studio5	Bong Sta. Maria	
2010 (36th)	RPG Metanoia (3rd)	Star Cinema, Ambient Media and Thaumatrope Animation Production	Charo Santos-Concio, Malou Santos, Rob Chien, and Charles A. Rapoport	
2011 (37th)	Manila Kingpin: The Asiong Salonga Story‡	VIVA Films	Leonard Villalon and Maylyn Villalon-Enriquez	
2011 (37th)	Enteng Ng Ina Mo (2nd)	Star Cinema, M-Zet TV Productions, APT Entertainment, Octo Arts Films	Charo Santos-Concio, Malou Santos, Marvic Castelo Sotto, Orly R. Ilacad, Antonio P. Tuviera	
2011 (37th)	Shake, Rattle & Roll 13 (3rd)	Regal Films	Roselle Monteverde - Teo	
2012 (38th)	One More Try‡	Star Cinema	Star Cinema	
2012 (38th)	El Presidente (2nd)	VIVA Films	Scenema Concept International, CMB Films, VIVA Films	
2012 (38th)	Sisterakas (3rd)	Star Cinema, VIVA Films	Charo Santos-Concio, Malou Santos, Vic R. Del Rosario Jr., Kristina Bernadette Aquino, Jose Marie Viceral, Martina Aileen de las Alas	
2013 (39th)	10,000 Hours‡	Viva Pictures	N2 Pictures, Philippine Film Studios	
2013 (39th)	Girl, Boy, Bakla, Tomboy (2nd)	Star Cinema, VIVA Films	ABS-CBN Film Productions, Inc.	
2013 (39th)	My Little Bossings (3rd)	OctoArts Films, M-Zet Productions, APT Entertainment, Kris Aquino Productions	Orly Ilacad, Marvic Sotto, Antonio Tuviera, Kristina Bernadette Aquino	
2014 (40th)	Bonifacio: Ang Unang Pangulo‡	Philippians Productions	Rina Navarro, E.A. Rocha	
2014 (40th)	English Only, Please (2nd)	Quantum Films	Joji Alonso	
2014 (40th)	Kubot: The Aswang Chronicles (3rd)	Reality Entertainment, GMA Films, Agostodos Pictures	Jose Mari Abacan, Erik Matti	
2015 (41st)	Walang Forever‡	Quantum Films, MJM Production, Tuko Film Productions, Buchi Boy Films	Josabeth Alonso, Edgardo Mangahas, Fernando Ortigas, EA Rocha	
2015 (41st)	Buy Now, Die Later (2nd)	Quantum Films, MJM Production, Tuko Film Productions	Quantum Films	
2015 (41st)	My Bebe Love: #KiligPaMore (3rd)	OctoArts Films, M-Zet Productions, APT Entertainment, GMA Films, MEDA Productions	Marvic Sotto, Martina Eileen delas Alas, Orly Ilacad, Antonio P. Tuviera, Annette Gozon-Abrogar, Jason Emmanuel	
2016 (42nd)	Sunday Beauty Queen (Note: Only one Best Picture winner was announced)	Voyage Studios	Chuck Gutierrez	
2017 (43rd)	Ang Larawan‡	Culturtain Musicat Productions	Girlie Rodis, Celeste Legaspi	
2017 (43rd)	Siargao (2nd)	Solar Pictures	Ten17 Productions	
2017 (43rd)	All of You (3rd)	Quantum Films	MJM Productions	
2018 (44th)	Rainbow's Sunset‡	Heaven's Best Entertainment	Harlene Bautista	
2018 (44th)	Aurora (2nd)	Viva Films	Aliud Entertainment	
2018 (44th)	One Great Love (3rd)	Regal Entertainment	Roselle Monteverde-Teo	
2019 (45th)	Mindanao‡	Centre Stage Productions, Solar Pictures	Brillante Mendoza and Carlo Valenzona	
2019 (45th)	Write About Love (2nd)	TBA Studios	Fernando M. Ortigas, E.A. Rocha and Lexter Favor Tarriela	
2019 (45th)	Sunod (3rd)	Ten17P, Globe Studios	-	

=== 2020s ===
Year	Film	Production Company(ies)	Producer(s)	Ref
2020 (46th)	Fan Girl‡	Black Sheep Productions, Globe Studios	Bianca Balbuena and Dan Villegas	
2020 (46th)	The Boy Foretold by the Stars (2nd)	Clever Minds Inc., The Dolly Collection, and Brainstormers Lab	Derick Cabrido, Jodi Sta. Maria, Omar Sortijas, Jose Maria Mendoza, Patricia Coronado, and Cenon Palomares	
2020 (46th)	Tagpuan (3rd)	Alternative Vision Cinemas	Alfred Vargas	
2021 (47th)	Big Night!‡	Cignal Entertainment, The IdeaFirst Company	Guido Zaballero, Sienna Olaso, Vitto Lazatin, Isabel Santillan and Ferdinand Lapuz	
2021 (47th)	Kun Maupay Man it Panahon (2nd)	Globe Studios, Black Sheep Productions, Dreamscape Entertainment	Josabeth Alonso, Yulia Evina Bhara, Armi Rae Cacanindin, Arleen Cuevas, Ling Tiong, Vincent Wang and Jonas Weydemann	
2021 (47th)	A Hard Day (3rd)	Viva Films	Vincent del Rosario III and Veronique del Rosario-Corpus	
2022 (48th)	Deleter‡	Viva Films, Pelikula Red	Mikhail Red, Vicente G. del Rosario III, Veronique del Rosario-Corpus, Vicente Del Rosario Jr.	
2022 (48th)	Mamasapano: Now It Can Be Told (2nd)	Borracho Film Production and Viva Films	Juvz Tesalona	
2022 (48th)	Nanahimik ang Gabi (3rd)	Rein Entertainment Philippines	Lino Cayetano and Philip King	
2023 (49th)	Firefly‡	GMA Pictures, GMA Public Affairs	Nessa Valdellon, Angeli Atienza and Kristian Julao, Exec. Producer Annette Gozon-Valdes	
2023 (49th)	GomBurZa (2nd)	Jesuit Communications Foundation, MQuest Ventures, and CMB Film Services	Pauline Mangilog-Saltarin, Ernestine Tamana	
2023 (49th)	Mallari (3rd)	Mentorque Productions	John Brian Diamante, Ronalyn Bana-ag	
2023 (49th)	When I Met You In Tokyo (4th)	JG Productions	Redgie A. Magno	
2024 (50th)	Green Bones‡	GMA Pictures, GMA Public Affairs	Nessa Valdellon, Angeli Atienza	
2024 (50th)	The Kingdom (2nd)	APT Entertainment, Mzet Productions, MediaQuest	Camille Montaño, Ruth Racela	
2024 (50th)	My Future You (3rd)	Regal Entertainment	Lily Monterverde, Roselle Monteverde, Keith Monteverde	
2024 (50th)	Isang Himala (4th)	Kapitol Films, UXS	Madonna Tarayo, Pepe Diokno	
2025 (51st)	I'mPerfect‡	Nathan Studios	Jaime Baltazar, Lorna Tolentino	
2025 (51st)	Unmarry (2nd)	Quantum Films, Cineko Films	Patricia Y. Sumagui	
2025 (51st)	Call Me Mother (3rd, tie)	ABS-CBN Studios, The IdeaFirst Company, Viva Films	Daniel G. Saniana, Marjorie B. Lachica, Vincent del Rosario III, Veronique del Rosario-Corpus, Valerie S. del Rosario	
2025 (51st)	Manila's Finest' (3rd, tie)	Cignal TV, MQuest Ventures	Peter Edward G. Dizon, Piolo Pascual, Erickson Raymundo, Jeffrey Vadillo	
