= Ang Alamat ng Lawin =

2002 Filipino film directed by Ronwaldo Reyes

- Theatrical release poster.
- Directed by: Ronwaldo Reyes
- Written by: Manny R. Buising
- Produced by: FPJ
- Starring: Fernando Poe, Jr.; Ina Raymundo
- Cinematography: Sergio Lobo
- Edited by: Manet A. Dayrit
- Music by: Jaime Fabregas
- Production company: FPJ Productions
- Release date: December 25, 2002 (Philippines)
- Running time: 98 minutes
- Country: Philippines
- Language: Filipino
- Box office: ₱20,453,252.95 (Official 2002 MMFF run)

Ang Alamat ng Lawin (lit. 'The Legend of the Hawk') is a 2002 Filipino fantasy swashbuckler film produced and directed by Fernando Poe Jr. — his final directorial work. The film stars Poe and Ina Raymundo along with new childstars Cathy Villar, Franklin Cristobal, Ryan Yamazaki, and Khen Kurillo.

Ang Alamat ng Lawin was released by FPJ Productions on December 25, 2002, as an official entry of the 28th Metro Manila Film Festival.

== Cast ==
- Fernando Poe Jr. as Lawin
- Ina Raymundo as Camila
- Cathy Villar as Rita
- Franklin Cristobal as Pepe
- Ryan Yamazaki as Kulas
- Khen Kurillo as Boy
- Romy Diaz
- Augusto Victa
- Alex Cunanan as Draka
- William Romero as Apo Ermitanyo

== Awards and nomination ==
Award-Giving Body	Category	Recipient	Result
2002 Metro Manila Film Festival	Best Film	Ang Alamat ng Lawin	Nominated
2002 Metro Manila Film Festival	Best Actor	Fernando Poe Jr.	Nominated
2002 Metro Manila Film Festival	Best Actress	Ina Raymundo	Nominated
2003 FAMAS Awards
2003 FAMAS Awards	Best Story	Manny R. Buising	Nominated
2003 FAMAS Awards	Best Sound	Arnold Reodica	Nominated
