= Super Inday and the Golden Bibe (1988 film) =

Filipino superhero comedy film

- Official movie poster
- Directed by: Luciano B. Carlos
- Written by: Jose Javier Reyes
- Starring: Maricel Soriano; Aiza Seguerra (Note: Seguerra came out as a transgender man in 2014 and is now known as Ice Seguerra.); Eric Quizon; Manilyn Reynes; Janno Gibbs; Melanie Marquez
- Cinematography: Gener Buenaseda
- Edited by: Efren Jarlego
- Music by: Jaime Fabregas
- Production company: Regal Films
- Release date: June 23, 1988
- Running time: 107 minutes
- Country: Philippines
- Languages: Filipino; English

Super Inday and the Golden Bibe (lit. 'Super Missy and the Golden Duck') is a 1988 Filipino superhero comedy film directed by Luciano B. Carlos, written by Jose Javier Reyes, and starring Maricel Soriano and Aiza Seguerra as the respective titular characters, alongside Eric Quizon, Manilyn Reynes, Janno Gibbs, and Melanie Marquez. Produced by Regal Films, it was released on June 23, 1988. Critic Lav Diaz gave the film a positive review, praising the costumes of the villains but criticizing the lack of distinction between right and wrong in a scene involving theft by children.

== Plot ==
A young fairy is banished to the human world for eating a forbidden fruit. She ends up in the rural town of Magubat in Pampanga, where she assumes the form of a white duck. She is taken as a pet by Inday, who lives with her three siblings, her mother Inda and abusive stepfather Brutus. Inday’s brothers name the duck Snow White.

Snow White defecates on Brutus while the latter sleeps, prompting the latter to threaten to leave Inda unless the duck is killed and fed to him. When Inday and her siblings reluctantly prepare to kill Snow White, the latter magically speaks and convinces them to spare her in exchange for future help. Amazed, Inday slaughters a neighbor’s chicken and serves it to Brutus instead, while her siblings hide Snow White, who transforms into a human girl when no one is looking.

One night, a meteorite carrying monstrous aliens led by Alakdana and bent on taking over the Earth crashes into Magubat. The monsters emerge and terrorize the town, leading to the arrival of a young journalist, Henzel, who is searching for a scoop. Inday develops a crush on him. When one of the monsters, in the form of a giant spider, attacks Brutus, Inday rushes to Snow White for help. Snow White lays a magic egg whose yolk Inday drinks, turning her into a superhero named Super Inday for an hour. Super Inday defeats the spider and rescues Brutus in front of Henzel, who becomes attracted to her.

After filing his story in Manila, Henzel returns to Magubat with his colleagues Tito and Madonna, who also has feelings for Henzel. Snow White tells a jealous Inday to dress up and act like Super Inday in front of Henzel without actually transforming into her, but Madonna exposes her as a fraud in front of Henzel, resulting in an angry mob attacking Henzel. Inday rushes to Snow White to get a magic egg and transforms into the real Super Inday before rescuing Henzel. After reverting to her normal self, Inday offers to show Henzel Super Inday's whereabouts. At their rendezvous, Henzel flirts with Inday, who confesses to being Super Inday, and tells her to bring a knife to make a blood compact as a sign of their love, but Snow White warns Inday that Alakdana's henchman, Hunyango, is disguising himself as Henzel after overhearing their earlier discussion. Snow White's warning is proved when Hunyango's reflection reveals itself in a mirror brought by Inday. Enraged, Super Inday beats up Hunyango, who is further punished by Alakdana upon his return to their lair.

A frustrated Alakdana leads a final assault on Magubat, badly mauling Tito and Madonna and capturing Henzel. Inday asks Snow White for a magic egg, but the latter inadvertently drops it on a basket full of eggs, forcing Inday to consume its contents while she rushes to Alakdana. At the last moment, Inday finds the magic egg and transforms to Super Inday in front of Alakdana and the villagers of Magubat. Super Inday, with Snow White's help, defeats Alakdana and rescues Henzel, who finally declares his love for Inday. Inday and Snow White, who transforms into her human form, are awarded by the town for their heroism before Inday, her family and Henzel send Snow White off as she returns to her home world.

== Cast ==
- Maricel Soriano as Super Inday / Inday
- Aiza Seguerra as the Golden Bibe / Snow White
- Eric Quizon as Henzel, a reporter
- Manilyn Reynes as Luding, Inday’s sister
- Janno Gibbs as Bugoy, Luding’s boyfriend
- Melanie Marquez as Alakdana (lit. 'Scorpion Lady')
- Nova Villa as Inda, mother of Inday
- Jimmy Santos as Brutus, the stepfather of Inday
- Mel Martinez
- Michael Roberts
- Palito as Hunyango, Alakdana’s chameleon-like henchman
- Ramil Rodriguez
- Roy Alvarez as Tito
- Flora Gasser as Bugoy’s mother
- Evelyn Vargas as Madonna
- Bomber Moran as thug
- Jack Fajardo

== Release ==
Super Inday and the Golden Bibe was released in Philippine theaters on June 23, 1988. It was originally due for release on June 9, but Regal Films head Lily Monteverde belatedly moved it to two weeks later the day before, with an industry observer speculating that it is to avoid competition with the release of Rambo III in local theaters.

=== Critical response ===
Lav Diaz, writing for the Manila Standard, gave Super Inday and the Golden Bibe a positive review. He expressed that the film has almost everything kids like, and especially gave praise to the villains' costumes for being cartoon-like and not looking fake. However, he criticized the film's lack of a clearly demonstrated difference between right and wrong for when the kids steal a chicken from their neighbor to save the duck Snow White from getting killed by Brutus, stating that "it is true that the cliched fight between a disciple of good and the evil spirits was demonstrated but it is not just the evil spirits that are bad. It is also bad to steal – even if it was presented as simply for fun."

== Home media ==
The film was released on DVD by Regal Entertainment in 2006.
