= Crying Ladies =

2003 Filipino comedy drama film

- Directed by: Mark Meily
- Written by: Melvin Lee; Tony Gloria; Francis Passion; Jeanne Lim; Jay Lozada
- Screenplay by: Mark Meily
- Based on: Bayad Luha by Mark Meily
- Produced by: Vincent Nebrida; Jun Reyes; Tony Gloria
- Starring: Sharon Cuneta; Hilda Koronel; Angel Aquino
- Cinematography: Lee Meily
- Edited by: Danny Añonuevo
- Music by: Vincent Abenojar De Jesus
- Production company: Unitel Pictures
- Distributed by: Unitel Pictures (Philippines); Digital Media Rights (US)
- Release dates: December 25, 2003 (Philippines); February 20, 2004 (US)
- Running time: 111 minutes
- Country: Philippines
- Languages: Filipino; Hokkien; Mandarin
- Box office: ₱70 million

Crying Ladies is a 2003 Filipino comedy-drama film directed by Mark Meily based on his Palanca-winning screenplay Bayad Luha. The film stars Sharon Cuneta as Stella, Hilda Koronel as Aling Doray, and Angel Aquino as Choleng, who are hired as professional funeral mourners by a wealthy Chinese-Filipino family in Manila's Chinatown, while they deal with their personal problems.

The film was released on December 25, 2003, in the Philippines as an entry to the 2003 Metro Manila Film Festival where it won five major awards including Best Picture, Best Director, Best Actor for Quizon, Best Supporting Actress for Koronel, and Best Child Performer for Pacheco. It was the Philippines' submission to the 77th Academy Awards for the Academy Award for Best Foreign Language Film.

== Plot ==
After the death of his father, Wilson is tasked by his wealthy Chinese-Filipino family to look for professional funeral mourners who will participate in the funeral rites. Despite the waning popularity of professional mourners, his family insists on hiring them so that his father can have a traditional Chinese funeral.

While searching in Manila's Chinatown, he meets Stella, a cash-strapped mother who has been recently released after serving time for fraud. Despite her initial apprehensions and realization that Wilson's father was responsible for her imprisonment, she agrees to be a funeral mourner after accepting a 500-peso advanced payment from Wilson. Stella tags two of her friends, Aling Doray, a former B-star actress who waxes nostalgic about her former acting career under the stage name Rhoda Rivera, and Choleng, a pious woman who vows to avoid sinning after having repeated affairs with her friend's husband Ipe.

During their stint as professional mourners, the three bond and talk about their experiences, struggles, and dreams in life. Stella is sad because of the impending departure of her young son Bong, who will be moving to Cagayan de Oro, along with her former husband Guido and his new wife Cecile. She wants to have a decent and stable job so she can reclaim custody and reunite with her son. Doray frequently reminisces about her acting career, particularly as an extra in Darna and the Giants. Choleng is trying to resist Ipe's advances and end their affair and make up for it by doing more religious and charity works.

After the burial of his father, Wilson, who had a tumultuous relationship with his father, forgives him for not being a good father and starts appreciating the good things he has done. He calls Stella to inform her that a Japanese promotion company is hiring entertainers. Stella immediately applies and gets the job, where she becomes a successful karaoke actress. Doray gets an offer to reprise her role as an extra in a sequel of Darna and the Giants. Choleng finally ends her affair with Ipe and is now a marriage counselor in her parish.

== Cast ==
- Sharon Cuneta as Stella Mate
- Hilda Koronel as Aling Doray/Rhoda Rivera
- Angel Aquino as Choleng
- Eric Quizon as Wilson Chua
- Ricky Davao as Guido
- Julio Pacheco as Bong
- Shamaine Buencamino as Cecile
- Sherry Lara as Mrs. Chua
- Raymond Bagatsing as Ipe
- Gilleth Sandico as Becky
- Joan Bitagcol as Grace
- Edgar Mortiz as Mang Gusting
- Bella Flores as Lost Lady
- Johnny Delgado as the Priest
- Lou Veloso as Barangay Chairman

== Production ==
Crying Ladies was based on Bayad Luha, a screenplay written by Meily in 2000 as part of his thesis for a screenwriting workshop by Filipino scriptwriter Armando Lao. He later entered it into the Don Carlos Palanca Awards in 2001 where it won the Third Prize in Dulaang Pampelikula (Filipino Division). Unitel Pictures producer Tony Gloria read the screenplay and described it as "unput-downable." Gloria offered the lead role to Cuneta, due to their previous collaborations in Dear Heart, P.S. I Love You, and Forgive and Forget. The role of Aling Doray was initially offered to Nida Blanca before she was murdered. As such, the role had to be re-written for Hilda Koronel.

Crying Ladies is the first Filipino film that makes extensive use of MILO Motion Control System and also the first Filipino film to be shot on the latest Kodak Eastman 2 film stock. It is the second Filipino movie to be locally recorded and mixed in Dolby SRD 5.1 technology.

== Release ==
=== Critical reception ===
Crying Ladies received mixed to positive reviews from critics. On review aggregator website Rotten Tomatoes, the film has an approval rating of 92% based on 13 reviews. On Metacritic, the film has a score of 54% based on reviews from 5 critics, indicating "mixed or average reviews".

The story was praised by several critics. A.O. Scott of New York Times wrote, "Its most winning attribute is a kind of sloppy, unassuming friendliness, a likability aptly reflected in its characters." Kevin Thomas of Los Angeles Times described the film as "An endearing comedy that deftly blends sentiment and grit and features a clutch of top Filipino stars." Eddie Cockrell of Variety praised Meily's direction and the cast's performance: “Crying Ladies moves smartly and evenly under the direction of debut helmer Mark Meily. Perfs sparkle, with each thesp comfortable navigating between broad comedy and legitimate pathos."

The film received some negative reviews. Mark Holcomb of Village Voice criticized the editing, but still praised the film, particularly Cuneta's performance: "Cuneta delivers an engaging, surprisingly coarse performance, considering her onetime Philippines-sweetheart status, and the subtle revelations concerning ritual and loss in Meily’s story serve her well. More judicious editing was surely called for, but Crying Ladies succeeds as first-rate melodrama." V.A. Musetto, writing for New York Post, also criticized the film: "There aren't many surprises as the story unfolds in soap-opera fashion, with a happy ending for all concerned."

== Music ==
=== Soundtrack ===
Crying Ladies: Official Soundtrack

Soundtrack album by Various Artists
- Released: December 25, 2003
- Genre: Pop/rock, R&B, OPM
- Label: Unitel

Crying Ladies was accompanied with a soundtrack during its theatrical release for the promotion of the album. The album contains pop/rock, R&B and OPM songs from various artists such as Kuh Ledesma, South Border and Parokya ni Edgar. It's carrier single Rainbow became a radio smash hit in 2004.

Crying Ladies: Official Soundtrack
No.	Title	Artist	Length
1.	"Rainbow"	South Border
2.	"Idlip"	Barbie's Cradle
3.	"Inner Strength (Love & Faith)"	Aliya Parcs
4.	"Magbabago"	Parliament Syndicate
5.	"My Imagination"	All-Star
6.	"Stay"	Boom Dayupay and Angel Jones of Kulay
7.	"With You Around"	Art Strong
8.	"Para Sa Iyo"	Serendipity
9.	"Goodbye"	604
10.	"Father"	Kuh Ledesma
11.	"Madapaka"	Parokya ni Edgar

== Accolades ==
Year	Award-Giving Body	Category	Recipient	Result
2003	Metro Manila Film Festival	Best Picture	Crying Ladies	Won
2003	Metro Manila Film Festival	Best Director	Mark Meily	Won
2003	Metro Manila Film Festival	Best Actor	Eric Quizon	Won
2003	Metro Manila Film Festival	Best Supporting Actress	Hilda Koronel	Won
2003	Metro Manila Film Festival	Best Child Performer	Julio Pacheco	Won
2004	FAMAS Awards	Best Actor	Eric Quizon	Nominated
2004	FAMAS Awards	Best Actress	Sharon Cuneta	Nominated
2004	FAMAS Awards	Best Supporting Actress	Hilda Koronel	Nominated
2004	FAMAS Awards	Best Director	Mark Meily	Nominated
2004	FAMAS Awards	Best Screenplay	Mark Meily	Nominated
2004	Gawad Urian Awards	Best Picture	Crying Ladies	Nominated
2004	Gawad Urian Awards	Best Director	Mark Meily	Nominated
2004	Gawad Urian Awards	Best Supporting Actor	Eric Quizon	Nominated
2004	Gawad Urian Awards	Best Supporting Actor	Julio Pacheco	Nominated
2004	Gawad Urian Awards	Best Supporting Actress	Hilda Koronel	Nominated
2004	Gawad Urian Awards	Best Supporting Actress	Sherry Lara	Nominated
2004	Gawad Urian Awards	Best Screenplay	Mark Meily	Nominated
2004	Gawad Urian Awards	Best Editing	Danny Añonuevo	Nominated
2004	Gawad Urian Awards	Best Cinematography	Lee Meily	Won
2004	Gawad Urian Awards	Best Production Design	Norman Regalado	Nominated
2004	Gawad Urian Awards	Best Music	Vincent De Jesus	Nominated
2004	Gawad Urian Awards	Best Sound	Danny Añonuevo	Nominated
2004	FAP Awards	Best Supporting Actor	Eric Quizon	Nominated
2004	Kerala International Film Festival	NETPAC Award	Mark Meily	Won
2004	Kerala International Film Festival	Golden Crow Pheasant	Mark Meily	Nominated
2004	Kerala International Film Festival	Silver Crow Pheasant	Mark Meily	Won

== See also ==
- Cinema of the Philippines
