= Mano Po =

2002 Filipino drama film

- DVD cover
- Directed by: Joel C. Lamangan
- Screenplay by: Roy C. Iglesias
- Story by: Roy C. Iglesias; Lily Y. Monteverde
- Produced by: Lily Y. Monteverde
- Starring: Maricel Soriano; Richard Gomez; Ara Mina; Kris Aquino; Eddie Garcia; Boots Anson-Roa
- Cinematography: Leslie Garchitorena
- Edited by: Tara Illenberger
- Music by: Von de Guzman
- Distributed by: Regal Entertainment
- Release date: December 25, 2002
- Running time: 133 minutes
- Country: Philippines
- Language: Filipino

Mano Po (Chinese: 吻手; pinyin: Wěn shǒu; Pe̍h-ōe-jī: Bún chhiú; lit. 'Hand Please') is a 2002 Filipino drama film produced by Regal Entertainment, and an entry to the 2002 Metro Manila Film Festival. The film's title refers to the "honoring-gesture" used in Filipino culture as a sign of respect to elders. The film focuses on the lives of the Chinese Filipino community. Mano Po stars an all-star cast headed by Maricel Soriano, Richard Gomez, Kris Aquino and Ara Mina. Eddie Garcia and Boots Anson-Roa play the patriarch and matriarch of the Go clan respectively.

The film won the most major awards in the film-awarding bodies, including 12 awards in the 28th Manila Film Festival in 2002. It was named Best Picture, Best Actor (for Eddie Garcia), Best Actress (for Ara Mina), Best Supporting Actress (for Kris Aquino) and Best Director (for Joel Lamangan). Mano Po was among the top-grossing films in time for the Metro Manila Filmfest.

The film's success was followed by a sequel, Mano Po 2: My Home and a spin-off, Bahay Kubo: A Pinoy Mano Po! that was released in 2007. The film was the first entry into what would become a franchise.

== Plot ==
Richelle and Raf narrate on a videotape the history of Richelle’s family, the Gos, for a documentary by her half-brother Jimmy. In 1949, Richelle's grandfather Luis Go brings his Filipino wife Elisa to China but returns with her to the Philippines amid the Chinese Civil War after Elisa fails to get along with her parents-in-law due to cultural differences. After taking on menial jobs, Luis invests in the copra industry and with his hard work and ability to cultivate connections with the changing political leadership, builds up a business empire now headed by his eldest grandchild and Richelle's sister, Vera.

Luis and Elisa produce two children: The eldest is Daniel, who begets three daughters: Vera, Juliet and Richelle from his wife Gina, and Jimmy, his son from another woman. Vera is a cold-hearted woman deemed the "Tiger Lady" who dedicates herself to running the family business while looking down on her siblings. Juliet is a housewife and mother, while the free-spirited Richelle is seen as the family "black sheep" for her scandalous behavior, lack of fluency in Chinese, and a shaky appreciation of her Chinese heritage. Jimmy is also a free-spirited man who is passionate for the arts despite his stutter and financial incapacity. Despite her reputation, Richelle maintains good relations with Juliet, her grandmother Elisa, who she sees as the bravest in the family for her past, and her aunt, Daniel's sister Linda, whose political activism and decision to marry a Filipino who was later forcibly disappeared in the 1980s, led to her being briefly disowned by Luis.

In the present, Luis celebrates his 80th birthday when he is interrupted by Richelle, who arrives wearing revealing clothes, brings along Joey, her disreputable boyfriend, and gives Luis a porn video as a present. A drug addict, Richelle is later arrested by policemen led by Raf, an Ilocano who becomes attracted to Richelle and convinces her to turn witness in return for dropping the charges against her. While working as an asset, Richelle and Raf develop a romantic relationship and resolve to marry, which her family opposes. Richelle is disowned by her family when she publicly implicates a family friend as a crime lord and fails to see her sick grandmother while she was with Raf. Meanwhile, Vera is also engaged to her long-time boyfriend Emerson, but their wedding is postponed after Elisa dies.

Emerson, concerned with how the Go sisters' lives are playing out, arranges for them to meet and resolve their problems altogether, but during the meeting, Vera expresses her resentment at having to work hard throughout her life while her sisters appear to have it easy, while Juliet complains that Vera keeps excluding her and Richelle accuses Vera of envying her free-spirited life as Vera storms out. After Juliet and Richelle discuss the outcome with Emerson, the two sisters are abducted while Emerson is fatally stabbed while trying to help them. The Gos refuse to let the police intervene, but Raf wiretaps the family's communications with the kidnappers and stages a rescue operation, during which Richelle narrowly survives being shot while shielding Juliet from a kidnapper.

At the hospital, Richelle recovers and gains the respect of her family, including Vera, who expresses regret at not having taken Emerson's advice to reconcile with her sisters before his death. Vera gives her engagement ring to Richelle as a wedding gift before migrating to Canada, and accepts her identity as a Filipino after years of complaining about anti-Chinese sentiment. Richelle and Raf's wedding pushes through with the Gos' blessing, with Richelle embracing her dual Filipino-Chinese identity and pledging to raise her children as such. The film ends with a presentation of famous Chinese Filipinos in history.

== Cast ==
=== Main cast ===
- Maricel Soriano as Vera Go
- Kris Aquino as Juliet Go-Co
- Richard Gomez as PCInsp. Rafael "Raf" Bala
- Ara Mina as Richelle Go-Bala

=== Supporting cast ===
- Eddie Garcia as Don Luis Go
- Tirso Cruz III as Daniel Go
- Eric Quizon as Joseph Co
- Cogie Domingo as young Luis/Fong Huan
- Jay Manalo as Emerson Lau
- Gina Alajar as Gina Chua-Go
- Amy Austria as Linda Go-De la Madrid
- Boots Anson-Roa as Elisa Malimban-Go
- Maxene Magalona as young Elisa

=== Minor cast ===
- Allan Paule as Antonio "Tonyo" De la Madrid
- Jim Pebanco as Mike De la Madrid
- Richard Quan as Joey Yang
- Carlo Maceda as Jimmy Go
- Nanding Josef as Gen. Dioscoro Blanco

== Awards ==
Year	Award-Giving Body	Category	Recipient	Result
2002	Metro Manila Film Festival	Best Picture	Mano Po	Won
2002	Metro Manila Film Festival	Best Director	Joel Lamangan	Won
2002	Metro Manila Film Festival	Best Actor	Eddie Garcia	Won
2002	Metro Manila Film Festival	Best Actress	Ara Mina	Won
2002	Metro Manila Film Festival	Best Supporting Actress	Kris Aquino	Won
2002	Metro Manila Film Festival	Best Cinematography	Leslie Garchitorena	Won
2002	Metro Manila Film Festival	Best Production Design	Tatus Aldana	Won
2002	Metro Manila Film Festival	Best Editing	Tara Illenberger	Won
2002	Metro Manila Film Festival	Best Original Story	Roy Iglesias and Lily Monteverde	Won
2002	Metro Manila Film Festival	Best Screenplay	Roy Iglesias	Won
2002	Metro Manila Film Festival	Best Musical Score	Von de Guzman	Won
2002	Metro Manila Film Festival	Gatpuno Antonio J. Villegas Cultural Awards	Mano Po	Won

== See also ==
- Mano Po (Filipino film series)
- Mano Po 2
- Mano Po III: My Love
- Ako Legal Wife
- Mano Po 5: Gua Ai Di
- Bahay Kubo: A Pinoy Mano Po!
- Mano Po 6: A Mother's Love
- Mano Po 7: Tsinoy
