= Eric Quizon =

Filipino actor, director, producer, writer and comedian (born 1967)

- Born: Enrico Smith Quizon; January 20, 1967 (age 59); Manila, Philippines
- Occupations: Actor; director; producer; writer; comedian; talent manager
- Years active: 1985–present
- Parents: Dolphy (father); Pamela Ponti (mother)
- Relatives: Epy Quizon (brother); Ronnie Quizon (brother); Madonna Quizon (sister); Vandolph (half-brother); Rolly Quizon (half-brother); Manny Boy Quizon (half-brother); Sahlee Quizon (half-sister); Zia Quizon (half-sister); Freddie Quizon (half-brother)

Enrico "Eric" Smith Quizon (born January 20, 1967) is a Filipino actor, director, producer, writer, comedian, and talent manager. He is the 10th child of the late comedian-actor, Dolphy. He is also a co-owner of Café Famous in Greenbelt, Makati. In late 2022, Quizon was tapped to become the head of Net 25's newest talent management arm, NET25 Star Center. He is also known for his notable roles in Mula sa Puso as Manuel Magbanua and Saan Ka Man Naroroon as Juancho Ocampo.

== Early life ==
Quizon was born on January 20, 1967, the second of four children born to Dolphy and actress Pamela Ponti (real name Alice Smith). He completed his college education at the Ateneo de Manila University, graduating with a degree in Interdisciplinary Studies.

== Personal life ==
Quizon has three siblings from his mother: Ronnie, Madonna, and Epy Quizon. He also has several half-siblings from his father's other relationships, including Vandolph and Zia Quizon. Following his father's hospitalization in 2012, Quizon served as the official spokesperson for the family, regularly addressing the media regarding Dolphy's medical condition and funeral arrangements.

Regarding his relationships, Quizon revealed in a May 2024 interview that his first girlfriend was television host and actress Kris Aquino. He stated that he was 20 years old and Aquino was 16 at the time of their relationship.

== Career ==
=== Acting ===
Quizon made his acting debut in the 1987 film Bata Batuta. He quickly gained critical recognition, winning the Best Supporting Actor award at the 1990 Gawad Urian Awards for his role in Pahiram Ng Isang Umaga (1989). Throughout the 1990s, he became a household name, balancing dramatic roles with comedy. He achieved widespread popularity starring alongside Redford White in the hit sitcom Buddy en Sol (1990–1995), a role he reprised in subsequent film adaptations. His acting prowess was further solidified when he won the Best Actor title at the 1991 Metro Manila Film Festival for Mongolian Barbecue.

In 2003, Quizon received further acclaim for his performance in Crying Ladies, playing the role of Wilson Chua, which earned him another Best Actor win at the Metro Manila Film Festival.

=== Directing and producing ===
While successful on camera, Quizon eventually expanded his career to include directing and producing. He made his directorial debut with the film Lucio & Miguel in 1992. Over the years, he has expressed a deep affinity for working behind the scenes, admitting in interviews that he finds a distinct fulfillment in directing compared to acting. His directorial portfolio covers a wide range of genres, from films like Langit sa Piling Mo (1997) and Pusong Mamon (1998) to major television fantasy series such as Darna, Majika, and Asian Treasures.

In December 2022, he expanded his role in the industry further by becoming the head of NET25 Star Center, the talent management arm of Net 25.

== Business ventures ==
As a steward of his father's estate, Quizon manages several business ventures launched to preserve the legacy of Dolphy. In 2023, the Quizon family officially launched Pidol's Banayad Whisky (PBW), a premium Scotch whisky brand. The brand serves as a homage to a classic comedic scene from the film Father en Son (1995), where Dolphy's character drunkenly struggles to film a commercial for a liquor of the same name. Quizon noted that the family decided to produce an official, FDA-approved version of the liquor after unauthorized "bootleg" sellers began profiting from his father's image.

In addition to the liquor line, Quizon oversees Pidol's Bakeshop, a bakery franchise named after his father's nickname. The bakeshop aims to make affordable bread accessible to local communities while serving as a steady source of royalties for the Quizon heirs. The family is also developing Dolphy Ville Estates in Calatagan, Batangas, which will feature a museum, "Dolphy Manor," dedicated to the late comedian's life and work.

== Awards ==
FAMAS Awards

- 1990 - Nominated for Best Supporting Actor for Pahiram Ng Isang Umaga (1989)
- 1992 - Won Best Supporting Actor for Hihintayin Kita Sa Langit (1991)

Gawad Urian Awards

- 1990 - Won Best Supporting Actor (Pinakamahusay na Pangalawang Aktor) for Pahiram Ng Isang Umaga (1989)
- 2004 - Nominated for Best Supporting Actor (Pinakamahusay na Pangalawang Aktor) for Crying Ladies (2003)

Metro Manila Film Festival

- 1991 - Won Best Actor for Mongolian Barbecue (1991)
- 2003 - Won Best Actor for Crying Ladies (2003)

Star Awards for movies

- 1990 - Won Supporting Actor of the Year for Pahiram Ng Isang Umaga (1989)
- 1999 - Darling of the Press

== Filmography ==
=== Film ===
Year	Title	Role	Note(s)	Ref(s).
1987	Bata Batuta			
1987	My Bugoy Goes to Congress			
1987	Mga Anak ni Facifica Falayfay	Eric Manalastas		
1988	Ibulong Mo sa Diyos			
1988	Rosa Mistica	Ramil Villafuerte	"Mga Pulang Rosas ni Rosanna" segment	
1988	Super Inday and the Golden Bibe	Edsel		
1988	Sa Akin Pa Rin ang Bukas		a.k.a. It's a Woman's World	
1989	Three Men and a Lola			
1989	Pahiram ng Isang Umaga	Ariel		
1989	Mga Kuwento ng Pag-Ibig			
1989	Kung Maibabalik Ko Lang	Rene		
1989	Too Young	Egay		
1989	Isang Araw Walang Diyos			
1989	Oras-Oras, Araw-Araw			
1989	My Darling Domestic (Greyt Iskeyp)			
1990	Hahamakin Lahat	Gerald		
1990	Espadang Patpat	Banjo		
1990	Shake, Rattle & Roll II	Mari	"Multo" segment	
1991	My Pretty Baby	Castro		
1991	Akin Ka Magdusa Man Ako			
1991	Onyong Majikero	Julius		
1991	Madonna, Babaeng Ahas			
1991	Hihintayin Kita sa Langit	Alan Illustre		
1991	Juan Tamad at Mister Shooli: Mongolian Barbecue	Juan Tamad		
1992	Tayong Dalawa			
1992	Lucio & Miguel	Miguel		
1992	Buddy en Sol (Sine Ito)	Buddy		
1992	Buddy en Sol 2: Pribate Depektibs	Buddy		
1992	Unang Tibok ng Puso	Ariel		
1993	Juan Tamad	Juan Tamad		
1993	Ingkong: Alpha at Omega			
1993	Bakit May Bukas Pa			
1993	Toink: Hulog ng Langit			
1994	The Elsa Castillo Story: Ang Katotohanan	Fred Castillo		
1994	Tagos sa Laman			
1994	Home Sic Home	Jun		
1995	Harvest Home	Joey	Original title: Inagaw Mo ang Lahat sa Akin	
1995	Maruja	Alex		
1996	Maginoong Barumbado			
1996	Wanted Perfect Murder	Jake		
1996	S'yempre Ikaw Pa Rin	Banjo		
1997	Wang Wang, Buhay Bombero			
1997	Nasaan Ka ng Kailangan Kita			
1997	Langit sa Piling Mo	Enrico		
1998	Pagdating ng Panahon	Ton		
1998	April, May, June: Mga Babae	Jonas		
1998	Pusong Mamon	Nick		
1999	Sumigaw Ka Hanggang Gusto Mo	Norman / Freddie		
1999	Ms. Kristina Moran, Ang Babaeng Palaban			
1999	Dito sa Puso Ko			
1999	Weder-Weder Lang 'Yan	Egay		
2000	Markova: Comfort Gay	Walterina Markova (middle years)		
2002	Mano Po	Joseph Co		
2003	Crying Ladies	Wilson Chua		
2004	I Will Survive	Mandy		
2004	So Happy Together	Osmond		
2007	Hide and Seek	Oliver Aliciano		
2007	Bahay Kubo: A Pinoy Mano Po!	Perry		
2009	Nobody, Nobody But... Juan	Waldo		
2014	Where I Am King			
2016	That Thing Called Tanga Na			
2016	Mano Po 7: Chinoy	Jason Wong		
2018	One Great Love	Dante Paez		
2019	Maledicto			
2025	Jackstone 5	Felix "Felicity"	Main role	

=== Television ===
Year	Title	Role
1990–1991	Computerman	
1990–1995	Buddy en Sol	Buddy
1992–1993	Eat Bulaga!	Himself (co-host)
1992–1997	Ready, Get Set, Go!	Himself (host)
1994	Star Drama Theater Presents: Carmina: The Champion	
1996	Bayani	José Rizal
1997	Mula sa Puso	Manuel Magbanua
1999	Saan Ka Man Naroroon	Juancho Ocampo
2001	Sana ay Ikaw na Nga	Gilbert Zalameda
2005	Quizon Avenue	Himself
2005	Hollywood Dream	Host
2009	All About Eve	Robert Villareal
2010	First Time	Jaime Ynfante
2010	My Driver Sweet Lover	Aaron Barrinuevo
2011	Babaeng Hampaslupa	Jefferson Go
2015	Oh My G!	Paul Cepeda
2016	FPJ's Ang Probinsyano	Ivan Gomez
2017	My Dear Heart	Dr. Francis Camillus
2017	Hanggang Saan	Edward Lamoste
2018	Magpakailanman: Nakawin Natin Ang Bawat Sandali	Chiu
2018	Victor Magtanggol	Hector Regalado
2019	Sahaya	Hubert Alvarez
2022	Quizon CT	Himself (various roles)
2024	3-in-1	Mac Liberica
2026	Delivery Boi	Enrique Aldomovar / Eduardo Aldomovar
2026	BuyBust: The Undesirables	TBA

=== Director ===
- Lucio & Miguel (1992) (as Enrico Quizon)
- Langit sa Piling Mo (1997) (as Enrico S. Quizon)
- Pagdating ng Panahon (1998) (as Enrico Quizon)
- Pusong Mamon (1998) (as Enrico Quizon)
- Sumigaw Ka Hanggang Gusto Mo (1999) (as Enrico S. Quizon)
- Ms. Kristina Moran, Ang Babaeng Palaban (1999) (as Enrico S. Quizon)
- Dito sa Puso Ko (1999) (as Enrico S. Quizon)
- Daddy O!, Baby O! (2000) (as Enrico S. Quizon)
- Home Alone Da Riber (2002) (as Enrico S. Quizon)
- Narito ang Puso Ko (2003) (as Enrico Quizon)
- Marinara (2004) GMA 7
- Darna (2005) GMA 7
- Wrinkles (2006)
- Majika (2006) GMA 7
- Asian Treasures (2007) GMA 7
- All About Eve (2009) (with Mac Alejandre)
- Nobody, Nobody But... Juan (2009) (as Enrico Quizon)
- Pidol's Wonderland (2010)
- My Driver Sweet Lover (2010)
- Babaeng Hampaslupa (2011)
- Glamorosa (2011–2012)
- Isang Dakot na Luha (2012)
- Enchanted Garden (2012)
- Cassandra: Warrior Angel (2013)
- Positive (2013)
- Ipaglaban Mo! (2014)
- Maalaala Mo Kaya (2014)
- Pasión de Amor (2015)
- Paano ang Pasko (2020)
- Quizon CT (2022)
- Project Baby (2026)

=== Producer ===
- Lucio & Miguel (1992) (as Enrico Quizon)
- Buddy en Sol (Sine ito) (1992) (as Enrico Smith Quizon)
- Buddy en Sol 2: Pribate Depektibs (1992) (as Enrico Quizon)
- Wanted Perfect Murder (1996) (producer) (as Enrico Quizon)
- Langit Sa Piling Mo (1997) (executive producer) (as Enrico S. Quizon)
- Pagdating Ng Panahon (1998) (executive producer) (as Enrico S. Quizon)
- Pusong Mamon (1998) (as Enrico Quizon)
- Sumigaw Ka Hanggang Gusto Mo (1999) (as Enrico Quizon)
- Ms. Kristina Moran, Ang Babaeng Palaban (1999) (as Enrico Quizon)
- Dito Sa Puso Ko (1999) (as Enrico Quizon)

=== Writer ===
- Langit Sa Piling Mo (1997) (as Enrico S. Quizon)
- Pagdating Ng Panahon (1998) (as Enrico S. Quizon)
- Ms. Kristina Moran, Ang Babaeng Palaban (1999) (as Enrico S. Quizon)
