= Gatpuno Antonio J. Villegas Cultural Award =

Film award based on Antonio Viillegas

- Awarded for: Best film that portrays Philippine culture and Filipino people to the world
- Country: Philippines
- Presented by: MMDA
- First award: 1990
- Currently held by: Manila's Finest (2025)
- Website: www.mmda.gov.ph/mmff/

Gatpuno Antonio J. Villegas Cultural Award is an annual event created by the Metro Manila Film Festival in honor of former mayor (gatpuno) Antonio Villegas. It awards lifetime achievement awards to films in the annual film festivals, and that portrays Philippine culture and Filipino people to the world.

== History ==
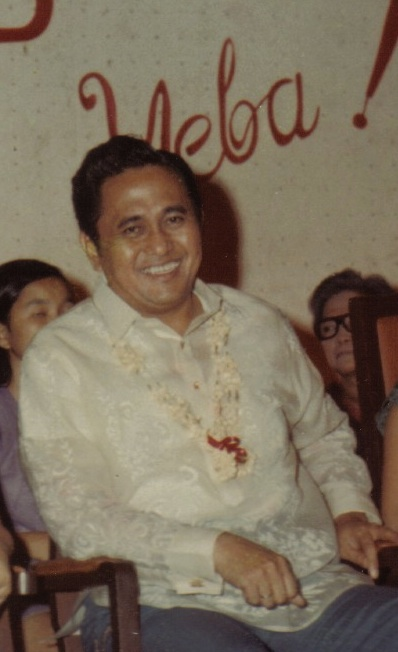
Founder of the Metro Manila Film Festival, Antonio Villegas in 1970.

Antonio Villegas, the Manila mayor during his time, created the Manila Film Festival, the father of the Metro Manila Film Festival and all other Philippine festivals. He appointed Attorney Espiridion Laxa to serve as the Chairman of the film festival which starts on June 14 and culminates on June 24, Manila's birthday. In addition, in an effort to promote Philippine films, Antonio Villegas banned the showing of foreign films at movie houses during the Manila Film Festival from June 14 through June 24. Furthermore, in order to instill national pride and prevent vagrants from sleeping in movie theaters, Villegas started the tradition of playing the national anthem at the beginning of each film showings. Despite criticism from smokers and cigarette manufacturers, Villegas was adamant in banning smoking from movie theaters. In that effort, he delivered his poetic verse which is displayed on movie screens right after the national anthem. It reads: "Hindi po nais namin kayo'ng pigilin, pero ang usok ay masamang hangin." This translates to "Not that we wish to restrain you, but smoke is foul air (stench)."

Most of the first batch of the festival films came up with English titles. The best films of Manila Film Festival included "Daigdig ng mga Api' (1966), "Dahil sa Isang Bulaklak" (1967), "Manila, Open City" (1968), "Patria Adorada" (1969), "Dimasalang" (1970), "Cadena de Amor" (1971), "Elias, Basilio at Sisa" (1972), "Nueva Vizaya" (1973), "Alaala mo Daigdig Ko" (1974). From 1975 to 1990, Manila Film Festival was discontinued as Metro Manila Film Festival took over.

Years after his death in 1984, a special award in the Metro Manila Film Festival bearing his name, the Gatpuno Antonio J. Villegas Cultural Award, was created in his honor and is given to the best film that best portrays Philippine culture and Filipino people to the world. MRN Film International's Andrea, Paano Ba ang Maging Isang Ina? was the first one to receive the lifetime achievement award in 1990.

== Special Award winners ==
=== 1990s ===
Year	Film	Production Company(ies)	Ref
1990 (16th)	Andrea, Paano Ba ang Maging Isang Ina?	MRN Film International	
1991 (17th)	Juan Tamad at Mister Shooli sa Mongolian Barbeque (The Movie)	FLT Film International	
1992 (18th)	Okay Ka Fairy Ko! Part 2	Regal Films and M-Zet Productions	
1993 (19th)	May Minamahal	Star Cinema	
1994 (20th)	None (Note: Most of the major awards were not given including the "Gatpuno Antonio J. Villegas Cultural Award" category.)		
1995 (21st)	Muling Umawit ang Puso	VIVA Films	
1996 (22nd)	Magic Temple	Star Cinema	
1997 (23rd)	Nasaan ang Puso?	MAQ Productions Inc	
1998 (24th)	José Rizal	GMA Films	
1999 (25th)	Muro-ami	GMA Films	

=== 2000s ===
Year	Film	Production Company(ies)	Ref
2000 (26th)	Tanging Yaman	Star Cinema	
2001 (27th)	Bagong Buwan	Star Cinema	
2002 (28th)	Mano Po	Regal Films	
2003 (29th)	Filipinas	VIVA Films	
2004 (30th)	Panaghoy sa Suba	CM Films Inc.	
2005 (31st)	Kutob	Canary Films	
2006 (32nd)	Kasal, Kasali, Kasalo	Star Cinema	
2007 (33rd)	Bahay Kubo: A Pinoy Mano Po!	Regal Films	
2007 (33rd)	Katas ng Saudi	Maverick Films	
2008 (34th)	Baler	VIVA Films	
2009 (35th)	Mano Po 6: A Mother's Love	Regal Entertainment	

=== 2010s ===
Year	Film	Production Company(ies)	Ref
2010 (36th)	Rosario	Cinemabuhay and Studio5	
2011 (37th)	Manila Kingpin: The Asiong Salonga Story	VIVA Communications Inc. and Scenema Concept International	
2012 (38th)	Thy Womb	Centerstage Productions	
2013 (39th)	10,000 Hours	Viva Pictures	
2014 (40th)	Bonifacio: Ang Unang Pangulo	Philippians Productions, Tuko Film Productions, Buchi Boy Productions, and RCP Productions	
2015 (41st)	My Bebe Love: #KiligPaMore	OctoArts Films, M - Zet Productions, APT Entertainment, GMA Films, and MEDA Productions	
2016 (42nd)	Sunday Beauty Queen	Voyage Studios	
2017 (43rd)	Ang Larawan	Culturtain Musicat Productions	
2018 (44th)	Rainbow's Sunset	Heaven's Best Entertainment	
2019 (45th)	Mindanao	Center Stage Production and Solar Pictures	

=== 2020s ===
Year	Film	Production Company(ies)	Ref
2020 (46th)	Suarez: The Healing Priest	Saranggola Media Productions	
2021 (47th)	Kun Maupay Man it Panahon	Globe Studios, Black Sheep Productions and Dreamscape Entertainment	
2022 (48th)	Family Matters	Cineko Productions, Inc.	
2023 (49th)	GomBurZa	Jesuit Communications Foundation, MQuest Ventures, and CMB Film Services	
2024 (50th)	The Kingdom	APT Entertainment, MQuest Ventures, and M - Zet Productions	
2025 (51st)	Manila's Finest	Cignal TV and MQuest Ventures	
