= Cogie Domingo =

Filipino actor and model

- Born: Redmond Christopher Fernandez Domingo; August 15, 1985 (age 41); Manila, Philippines
- Years active: 1993–present (on hiatus from 2007–2009)
- Agents: Star Magic GMA Artist Center; Talent5
- Spouse: Ria Sacasas
- Children: 1

Redmond Christopher Fernandez Domingo (born August 15, 1985), known professionally as Cogie Domingo, is a Filipino actor and model.

== Career ==
At age 13, he joined the cast of ABS-CBN's Cyberkada. This was followed by Regal Films' horror flick, Sa Piling ng mga Aswang (1999), in which he starred opposite Maricel Soriano. His next project was Jose Javier Reyes' Yakapin Mo ang Umaga (2000), where he played son to Christopher de Leon and Lorna Tolentino. But what was his most memorable is his lead portrayal of the juvenile prisoner in the award-winning filmfest entry, Deathrow in 2000, in which he co-starred with Eddie Garcia and was coached by director Joel Lamangan. He also starred in different television shows such as Ikaw Lang ang Mamahalin with Angelika dela Cruz, Kung Mawawala Ka with Sunshine Dizon and Bakekang with Lovi Poe.

His career began in ABS-CBN at 1993 at the age of 8, as first seen in Star Drama Presents. In 1999, he moved to GMA Network until 2006.

He went back to showbiz, returned to ABS-CBN, appearing in Maalaala Mo Kaya after being out for almost four years since 2010.

Domingo moved to TV5, appears in Inday Wanda, P. S. I Love You and Valiente. After 3 years, Domingo left TV5.

In 2015, he appeared in GMA Network again as joining the cast of Buena Familia starring Angelu de Leon, Bobby Andrews, Kylie Padilla, Julie Anne San Jose, Julian Trono and Mona Louise Rey.

His appearance on ABS-CBN in 2016, is Ipaglaban Mo!. Domingo's final drama appearance at GMA Network is Someone to Watch Over Me.

Domingo made his return after two-year hiatus, but his appearance on ABS-CBN in 2019 is FPJ's Ang Probinsyano who portrayed as Captain Eric Opeña.

== Personal life ==
Domingo is the son of a lawyer. The actor was linked to different actresses like Anne Curtis, Angel Locsin, Sunshine Dizon, and Lovi Poe. In September 2009, it was reported in the news that he had an affair with Rachel Tiongson while she was still cohabiting with politician and businessman Chavit Singson. On March 11, 2016, Domingo married his long-time girlfriend, Ria Sacasas, in an intimate ceremony. Domingo has one daughter with a former girlfriend.

On October 27, 2017, Domingo and two other persons were arrested by PDEA for possession of illegal drugs. Three days later, Domingo was allowed by PDEA to post bail; he remain imprisoned until November 2017.

== Filmography ==
=== Film ===
Year	Title	Role
1999	Sa Piling ng mga Aswang	Joshua
2000	Yakapin Mo ang Umaga	Gabby
2000	Deathrow	Sonny
2001	Cool Dudes	Norm
2002	Pakisabi na Lang Mahal Ko Siya	Gonzo
2002	Mano Po	Young Luis/Fong Muan
2003	Anghel sa Lupa	Benjo
2003	Mano Po 2: My Home	Lean Tan
2004	Kuya	Noy
2004	So... Happy Together	Oliver
2006	Mourning Girls	Raffy
2010	Muli	Errol
2012	The Healing	Ryan
2019	Man and Wife	Fernan

=== Television ===
Year	Title	Role
1993–1998	Star Drama Presents	
1998	Cyberkada	Himself
2000	Click	Gio Santillan
2001	Ikaw Lang ang Mamahalin	Jepoy
2002–2003	Kung Mawawala Ka	Carlito Valiente
2003	Lagot Ka, Isusumbong Kita	Kiko
2003	Love To Love Season 1: Maid For Each Other	Dodong
2004–2005	Joyride	Jason Miranda
2004	Love to Love Season 3: Kissing Beauty	Joseph
2005	Darna	Daniel
2005	Now and Forever: Ganti	Javier
2006	Bakekang	Johnny
2006	Love To Love Season 12: Jass Got Lucky	Rico
2006	The Score	Ned
2010	Inday Wanda	Joel
2010	Maalaala Mo Kaya	Daniel
2011–2012	P. S. I Love You	Donald Bautista
2012	Valiente	Young Armando
2015	Buena Familia	Kardo
2016	Ipaglaban Mo: Kapitbahay	Dan
2016	Wagas	
2016	Mars	Himself / Guest
2016–2017	Someone to Watch Over Me	Ian Alejandro
2019	FPJ's Ang Probinsyano	PCpt. Eric Opeña
2019	Sandugo	Alfie
