= Boots Anson-Roa =

Filipina actress, columnist, editor, and lecturer

- Anson-Rodrigo in 2026
- Born: Maria Elisa Cristobal Anson; January 30, 1945 (age 81); Manila, Philippine Commonwealth
- Occupations: Actress, host, columnist, editor, lecturer
- Years active: 1962–present
- Political party: Pwersa ng Masang Pilipino
- Spouses: Pedro "Pete" Roa (m. 1964; died 2007) Francisco "King" Rodrigo Jr. (m. 2014)
- Children: 4, including Chiqui
- Parent(s): Oscar Moreno (father); Belen Cristobal (mother)
- Relatives: Alvin Anson (brother)

Maria Elisa Cristobal Anson-Rodrigo (née Anson; born January 30, 1945), better known as Boots Anson-Roa, is a Filipino actress, columnist, editor, and lecturer.

== Early life and education ==
Anson-Roa, a Bicolana, is the eldest daughter of post-war matinee idol Oscar Moreno, then known as the Robert Taylor of the Philippines, and Belen Cristobal-Anson, a descendant of Epifanio de los Santos. Her father, Oscar Moreno was an actor and merchant mariner and her mother Belen Cristobal-Anson was a chemist and a pharmacy graduate.

She finished her primary and secondary education at the Assumption Convent, Manila. From 1960 to 1964 she studied for an A.B. in Speech and Drama at the University of the Philippines, but did not graduate. From 1983 to 1984 she studied Journalism and Public and Media Relations at Georgetown University, Washington D.C.

== Career ==
=== Acting career ===
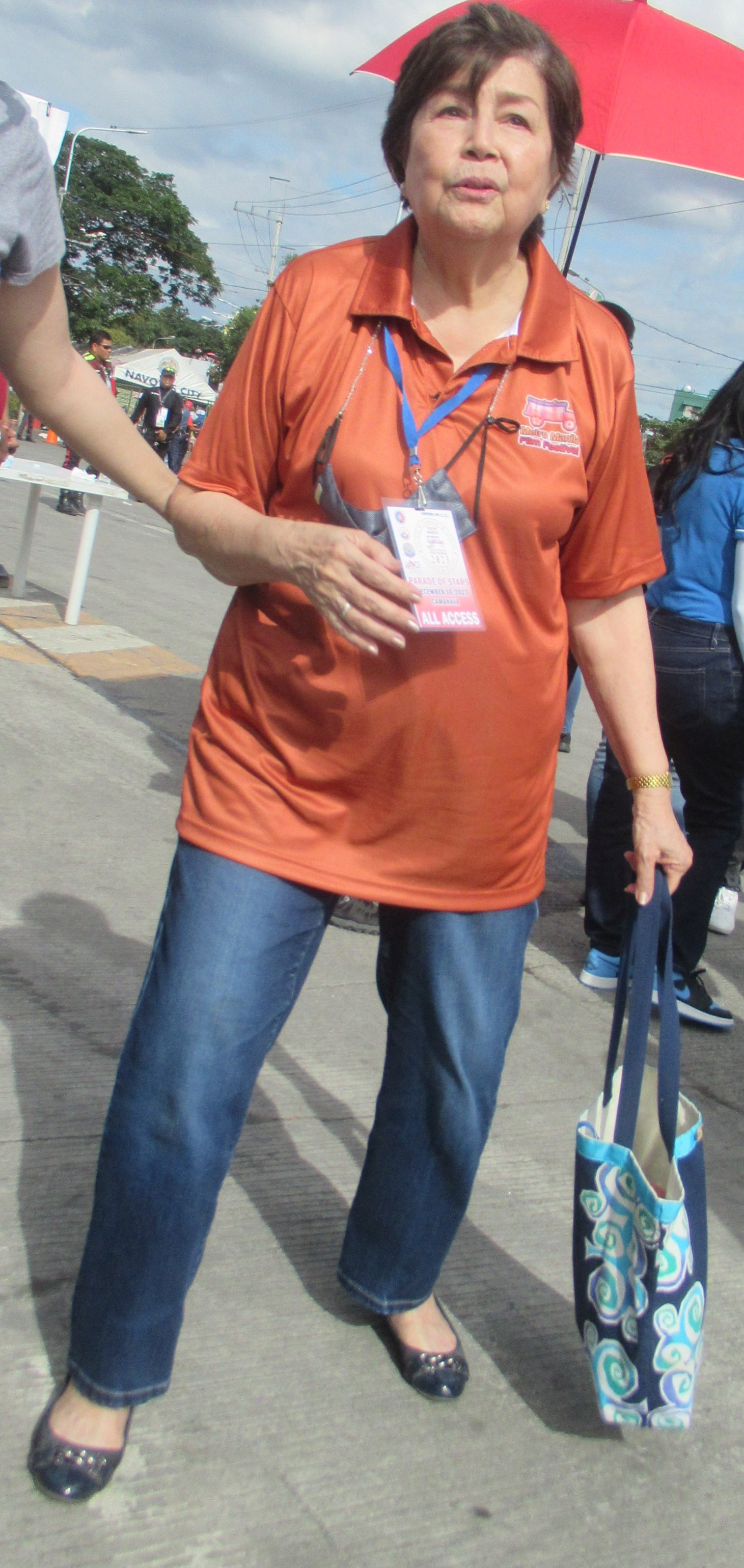
Anson-Roa during the 2023 Metro Manila Film Festival

Anson-Roa began acting in 1968 and appeared in 110 featured films. She acted opposite actors Dante Rivero, Joseph Estrada, and Fernando Poe Jr. under Sampaguita Pictures and with Ramon Revilla Sr. She was given Lifetime Achievement awards by FAMAS and Star Awards.

=== Professional activities ===
She was the director of the U.P.-PGH Medical Foundation from 1979 to 1981, and the Philippine National Red Cross from 1980 to 1982.

Anson-Roa unsuccessfully ran for a seat in the Senate of the Philippines in 2004 for the Koalisyon ng Nagkakaisang Pilipino (KNP).

She was the president of MOWELFUND, Inc. from 2002 to 2020. In 1982, she was appointed as Press Attaché and Cultural Officer as well as Special Assistant to the Ambassador at the Philippine Embassy in Washington DC.

== Awards and honours ==
- Outstanding Movie Personality: PMPC – 1979
- FAMAS Award for Uplifting the Movie Industry: FAMAS Awards – 1976
- Best Emcee ALIW Awards: – 1979–1981
- Ten Outstanding Women in the Nation's Service Award: TOWNS Foundation – 1974
- Gintong Ina Awardee: Guillermo Mendoza Foundation – 1994
- Outstanding Women in Media: Philippine Women's University – 1995
- Outstanding Media Practitioner: Eastern Telecommunications – 1997
- Lifetime Achievement Award: Star Awards for Movies – March 2001
- Lifetime Achievement Award: FAMAS Awards – March 2003
- Best TV Actress (MMK:Kamison – 22nd Golden Dove Awards – 2014
- Outstanding Manilan Award – 2017

== Filmography ==
=== Film ===
- El perro gancho (1968)
- Siete Dolores (1968)
- Ang Kawatan (1969)
- Adriana (1969)
- Rowena (1969) Sonya
- Si Darna at ang Planetman (1969) – Cynthia
- Wanted: Perfect Mother (1970) - Carla
- Santiago! (1970) – Rowena
- "Ang Uliran: Imelda" (1970)
- I Love Mama, I Love Papa (1971)
- The Wonderful World of Music (1971)
- Living Doll (1971)
- Ang Kampana sa Santa Quiteria (1971)
- Liezl at ang 7 Hoods (1971)
- El Vibora (1972) Cecilia
- Tatay Na Si Erap (1972)
- Santo Domingo (1972)
- Villa Miranda (1972)
- Ang Agila At Ang Araw (1973)
- Zoom, Zoom, Superman! (1973) – Superman's Creator
- Tanikalang Dugo (1973)
- Ander Di Saya Si Erap (1973)
- James Wong (1973)
- Paruparong Itim (1973)
- May Isang Tsuper ng Taksi (1974)
- Dalawa Ang Nagdalantao Sa Akin (1974)
- Bawal: Asawa Mo, Asawa Ko (1974)
- Sumigaw Ka Hanggang Ibig Mo! (1974)
- Lulubog Lilitaw Sa Ilalim Ng Tulay (1974) – Sister Elisa
- Ang Manika Ay Takot sa Krus (1975)
- Pagsapit ng Dilim (1975)
- Anak ng Araw (1975)
- Anino ng Araw (1975)
- Saan Ka Pupunta Ms. Lutgarda Nicolas? (1975) – Lutgarda Nicolas
- Ang Pag-Ibig Ko'y Huwag Mong Sukatin (1975)
- Mga Uhaw na Bulaklak (1975)
- Isang Gabi, Tatlong Babae (1975)
- Isinumpa (1975)
- Postcards From China (1975)
- The Goodfather (1975)
- Ang Lihim ni Rosa Henson Sa Buhay ni Kumander Lawin (1976) – Rosa Henson Averion
- Tatlong Kasalanan (1976)
- Daigdig ng Lagim (1976)
- Hubad Na Bayani (1977)
- Hatiin Natin ang Gabi (1978)
- Malabanan: Kilabot Hunter ng Cavite (1978)
- Mga Mata ni Angelita (1978) – Mother Superior
- Camerino (1978)
- Hermano Puli (1979)
- Warrant of Arrest (1979)
- Tonyong Bayawak (1979)
- Angelita... Ako ang Iyong Ina (1980) – Mother Superior
- Hiwaga (1980)
- Tembong (1980)
- P.S. I Love You (1981) – Isabel
- Jack en Jill sa Amerika (1988)
- Doring Dorobo (1993)
- The Myrna Diones Story: Lord, Have Mercy! (1993)
- Kadenang Bulaklak (1993) – Mrs. Hidalgo
- May Minamahal (1993) – Becky
- Mayor Cesar Climaco (1994) – Julia Floreta-Climaco
- Bawal Na Gamot (1994)
- The Grepor Butch Belgica Story (1994)
- The Maggie dela Riva Story: God... Why Me? (1994)
- The Anabelle Huggins Story – Ruben Ablaza Tragedy: Mea Culpa (1995)
- Kahit Harangan ng Bala (1995) – Aling Cedes
- The Lilian Velez Story: Till Death Do Us Part (1995)
- Mangarap Ka (1995) – Belen
- Kay Pait ng Bukas (1996)
- Ama, Ina, Anak (1996) – Cita Nolasco
- Ibulong Mo Sa Diyos 2 (1997)
- Nagmumurang Kamatis (1997)
- FLAMES: The Movie (1997) – Amparo (segment "Pangako")
- Adarna: The Mythical Bird (1997) – Narrator
- May Isang Pamilya (1999) – Isabel
- Hinahanap-Hanap Kita (1999) – Mrs. Matias
- Ganito Ako Magmahal (1999)
- Kapalit? (2002)
- Mano Po (2002) – Elisa Go
- The Cory Quirino Kidnap: NBI Files (2003)
- Bridal Shower (2004) – Doña Vergie
- Mano Po III: My Love (2004) – Maria
- Ilusyon (2005) Doktor
- Ang Anak ni Brocka (2005)
- Pepot Artista (2005) Richter
- Blue Moon (2005) Cora
- Ang Huling Araw ng Linggo (2006) Aling Tess (segment "Martes")
- White Lady (2006) Lola Tasya
- Sukob (2006) Tessie
- Rekados (2006) Josefina
- Mano Po 5: Gua Ai Di (2006) Ama
- Angels (2007) Lola Conching (segment "Angel of Love")
- Shake, Rattle & Roll 9 (2007) Lola Susana (segment "Christmas Tree")
- When Love Begins (2008) Marietta Caballero
- Caregiver (2008) Marissa Gonzales
- One True Love (2008) Lola
- Lovebirds (2008)
- Tutok (2009) Lydia
- Mano Po 6: A Mother's Love (2009) Jin Feng
- Till My Heartaches End (2010) Tita Baby
- Ang Babae Sa Sementeryo (2010) Sister Sol
- Ika-Sampu (2010) Mrs. Amada dela Vega
- Shake, Rattle & Roll 13 (2011) Marites
- My House Husband: Ikaw Na! (2011) Lilia
- Unfriend (2014) Grandma Ester
- Third Eye (2014) Gloria

=== Television ===
Year	Title	Role	Notes
1962–1967	Two for the Road		
1962–1972	Dance-O-Rama	Herself	
1966–1969	Sunday Sweet Sunday		
1970–1972	Elisa		
1975–1979	Seeing Stars With Joe Quirino	Herself	Guest co-host
1975	Kapwa Ko Mahal Ko	Herself	Host
1983	Lovingly Yours, Helen	Herself	Host
1993–1994	GMA Telecine Specials		
1993–1995	Ako....Babae		
1993	Da Look-A-Layks: Pinabiyak Na Bunga		
1995	World Youth Day 1995 The Pope in Manila	Herself	Host
1999	Maalaala Mo Kaya: Lollipop		Episode guest
1999	Saan Ka Man Naroroon	Amparo	
2000	Sharing in the City		
2000	Alas Dose sa Trese	Herself	Host
2001–2002	Sa Dulo ng Walang Hanggan	Corazon Montenegro	Supporting Role / Protagonist
2002	Ang Iibigin ay Ikaw	Felisa	
2004	Love to Love: Sweet Exchange		Episode guest
2005	Sugo	Adela	
2005	Magpakailanman		Episode guest
2006	Pinoy Dream Academy	Herself/Media Ethics Teacher	
2006	Komiks Presents: Da Adventures of Pedro Penduko	Aswang	
2007	Kokey	Doña Ingrid Allegre	
2007	Pangarap na Bituin	Perla Ledesma	
2009	May Bukas Pa	Esmeralda	
2011	Minsan Lang Kita Iibigin	Remedios "Elena" Sebastiano	Supporting role / Antagonist
2011	Munting Heredera	Ingrid Spencer-Lobregat	Supporting role
2012	My Beloved	Old Sharina	
2012	Luna Blanca	Donya Priscilla	
2012	Maalaala Mo Kaya	Rose	Episode guest
2012	Aso ni San Roque	Doña Constancia "Connie" Aragon	Supporting role / Antagonist
2013	Maalaala Mo Kaya: Kamison	Tessa	Episode guest
2013	Misibis Bay	Delia Ramirez	
2014	Rhodora X	Amparo "Panchang" Sales	
2014	Strawberry Lane	Stella Tolentino	Special participation / Anti-hero
2015	Baker King	Lee Hye Yeong	
2015	LolaBasyang.com	Lola B	Narrator
2015	Sabado Badoo	Herself	Cameo Footage Featured
2015	Princess in the Palace	Doña Victorina Jacinto	Supporting role / Anti-hero
2015	Walang Iwanan	Ina	Special participation
2017	Destined to be Yours	Helen Rosales	Supporting role / Protagonist
2019	Hanggang sa Dulo ng Buhay Ko	Adora "Abuela" Divinagracia	Supporting role / Anti-hero
2021	First Yaya	Madame President Diane Carlos	Special participation
2022	Mano Po Legacy: The Family Fortune	Doña Consuelo Yang-Chan	Supporting role / Anti-hero
2027	Whispers From Heaven	TBA	TBA

=== Radio shows ===
- Boots Talk (DZMM)
- Music and Memories (DZMM)

== Personal life ==
In 1964, Boots Anson married Pedro "Pete" Roa who was her co-host in the television show Dance-o-Rama. They had four children. Pete Roa died in 2007.

On November 30, 2013, she was engaged to lawyer Francisco "King" Rodrigo Jr., son of Senator Francisco "Soc" Rodrigo. They married on June 14, 2014.
