= Mano Po (film series) =

Filipino drama anthology film series

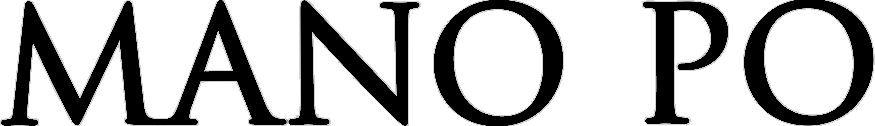
- Official franchise logo
- Directed by: Joel Lamangan (1, 3–6); Erik Matti (2); Ian Loreños (7)
- Starring: Various
- Production company: Regal Entertainment
- Country: Philippines
- Language: Filipino

Mano Po (Chinese: 吻手; pinyin: Wěn shǒu; Pe̍h-ōe-jī: Bún siú; lit. 'Hand please') is a Filipino drama anthology film series produced by Regal Entertainment, and is one of the most successful film series produced in the history of Philippine cinema, and the second longest-running Filipino film series, the first being Shake, Rattle & Roll which had a total of 16 films with three episodes each. The series has seven productions and also includes Ako Legal Wife: Mano Po 4? and Bahay Kubo: A Pinoy Mano Po!. All episodes are directed by Joel Lamangan, with the exception of Mano Po 2: My Home (2003) which was helmed by Erik Matti, and Mano Po 7: Chinoy (2016) which was helmed by Ian Loreños. The series focuses on the ways and traditions of the Chinese Filipino community.

Another tradition for the cast and crew of the Mano Po series is the visit of several cities in China, including Great Wall of China, Forbidden City in Beijing (also shown for Mano Po 6: A Mother's Love) and Shanghai; in Tokyo, Japan (for Mano Po 2: My Home); and Bangkok, Thailand (for Mano Po III: My Love).

== List of films ==
=== Mano Po (2002) ===
Starring: Maricel Soriano, Kris Aquino, Richard Gomez, Ara Mina, Eddie Garcia

Regal Entertainment produced the first Mano Po film, known also as Mano Po 1: My Family. The film won twelve MMFF awards including Best Picture. The story revolves around a Chinese immigrant Don Luis Go (Eddie Garcia) whom at the young age left China to be with his Filipino wife Elisa (Boots Anson-Roa). They had two children Daniel (Tirso Cruz III) and Linda (Amy Austria). The Go family had three granddaughters Vera (Maricel Soriano), the eldest and heiress to the Go family business, Juliet (Kris Aquino) and Richelle (Ara Mina), the youngest and the blacksheep of the family.

=== Mano Po 2: My Home (2003) ===
Starring: Susan Roces, Christopher de Leon, Lorna Tolentino, Kris Aquino, Zsa Zsa Padilla, Judy Ann Santos, Richard Gutierrez, Jay Manalo

Antonio Chan, a prominent Chinese businessman, had three women in his life: Sol, a Filipina; Lu Shui, a Chinese; and Belinda, a Filipino-Chinese. Antonio has children with all three women. A crisis shakes up the over-extended Tsinoy family prompting all the members to re-examine their values, their relationships, and confront issues that they have refused to face all these years. With Mano Po 2: My Home, Regal Entertainment continues the tradition established by the critical and box-office hit of the first Mano Po film. Features strong dramatic performances from a stellar ensemble cast, lush visuals, a reverberating musical score, an unforgettable theme song, and a heart-warming screenplay that eloquently captures the rich Tsinoy culture. Laugh, cry, and be touched by this family story about forgiveness, healing and undying love.

=== Mano Po III: My Love (2004) ===
Starring: Vilma Santos, Christopher de Leon, Jay Manalo, Angel Locsin, Angelica Panganiban, Dennis Trillo, Eddie Garcia, Jean Garcia

The third film marks the appearance of Vilma Santos as Lilia Chiong-Yang, an anti-crime crusader who was romantically torn between Michael (Christopher de Leon, in their latest team-up after Dekada 70) and Paul (Jay Manalo). The film won the 2004 Metro Manila Film Festival (MMFFF) Best Picture Award. Santos won the best actress award in the said film fest.

Produced by Regal's sister production MAQ Productions, Mano Po III marks the return of Joel Lamangan as the series' director. Lamangan, however, lost to Cesar Montano (for Panaghoy sa Suba) for winning the Best Director Award in the same MMFF year.

=== Ako Legal Wife: Mano Po 4? (2005) ===
Starring: Zsa Zsa Padilla, Rufa Mae Quinto, Cherry Pie Picache, Jay Manalo

The comedy-focused entry of the series focuses on concubinage. Zsa Zsa Padilla won the best actress award in the 2005 Metro Manila Film Festival. It is revealed that this film is officially called "Mano Po 4" after the release of Mano Po 5 due to the return of Padilla since My Home.

=== Mano Po 5: Gua Ai Di (2006) ===
Starring: Angel Locsin, Richard Gutierrez, Lorna Tolentino

This series is more of a romantic comedy-drama rather than the earlier ones which center around serious drama. However, Angel Locsin's appearance as the leading role for this film is her last project with Regal Entertainment (not counting The Promise) followed by her transfer to ABS-CBN a year later. "Gua ai di" can be translated as "I love you" in the Philippine dialect of the Hokkien Chinese language, also known as "Fukien" in the Philippines.

=== Mano Po 6: A Mother's Love (2009) ===
Starring: Sharon Cuneta, Christopher de Leon, Dennis Trillo, Heart Evangelista

The new tale marks the first project of Sharon Cuneta under Regal Films. This is also a reunion movie for Cuneta with Joel Lamangan (last worked in Walang Kapalit in 2003) and Christopher de Leon (last worked in Magkapatid in 2002).

The dramatic story focuses on billionaire Melinda Uy, who had a rags-to-riches story of hardships and triumphs as a Chinese-Filipino woman.

=== Mano Po 7: Chinoy (2016) ===
Starring: Richard Yap, Jean Garcia, Enchong Dee, Janella Salvador

The story focuses on the relationship and modern generation of Tsinoys. The film started with Richard Yap, making him the first and the only male lead protagonist in the entire series. This time, Ian Loreños is the director.

== Spin-offs ==
- Bahay Kubo: A Pinoy Mano Po! – a 2007 film that focuses on family in the pure Philippine setting
- Mano Po Legacy – a 2022 television series
