= Lily Monteverde =

Filipino film producer and businesswoman (1938–2024)

Mother Lily Lily Yu Monteverde
- 楊莉華
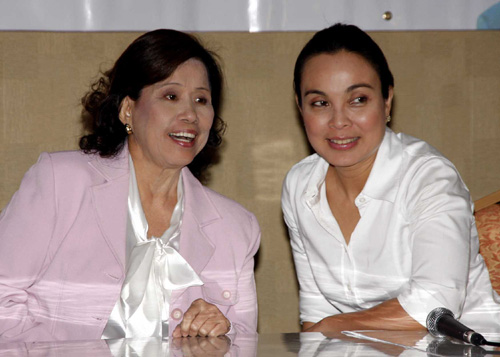
- Monteverde (left) with Loren Legarda (right) in 2008
- Born: Lily Yu Chu; 19 August 1938; Manila, Philippines
- Died: 4 August 2024 (aged 85); Manila, Philippines
- Resting place: The Heritage Park, Taguig, Philippines
- Other name: Mother Lily
- Occupations: Film producer, hotelier
- Years active: 1960–2024
- Spouse: Leonardo "Remy" Monteverde (died 2024)
- Children: 6, including Goldwin
- Parent: Domingo Chu (father)

Lily Yu Chu-Monteverde (19 August 1938 – 4 August 2024), known as Mother Lily and professionally credited as Lily Yu Monteverde, was a Chinese Filipino film producer and businesswoman.

Monteverde was one of the first Filipina movie producers who produced many local blockbuster films under different genres in the 1970s and 1980s. She produced movies with Alma Moreno, Lorna Tolentino, Maricel Soriano, Snooky Serna and Dina Bonnevie starring as lead stars during that time. She also propelled Richard Gomez and Aga Muhlach's careers to greater heights in the early 1990s.

== Career ==
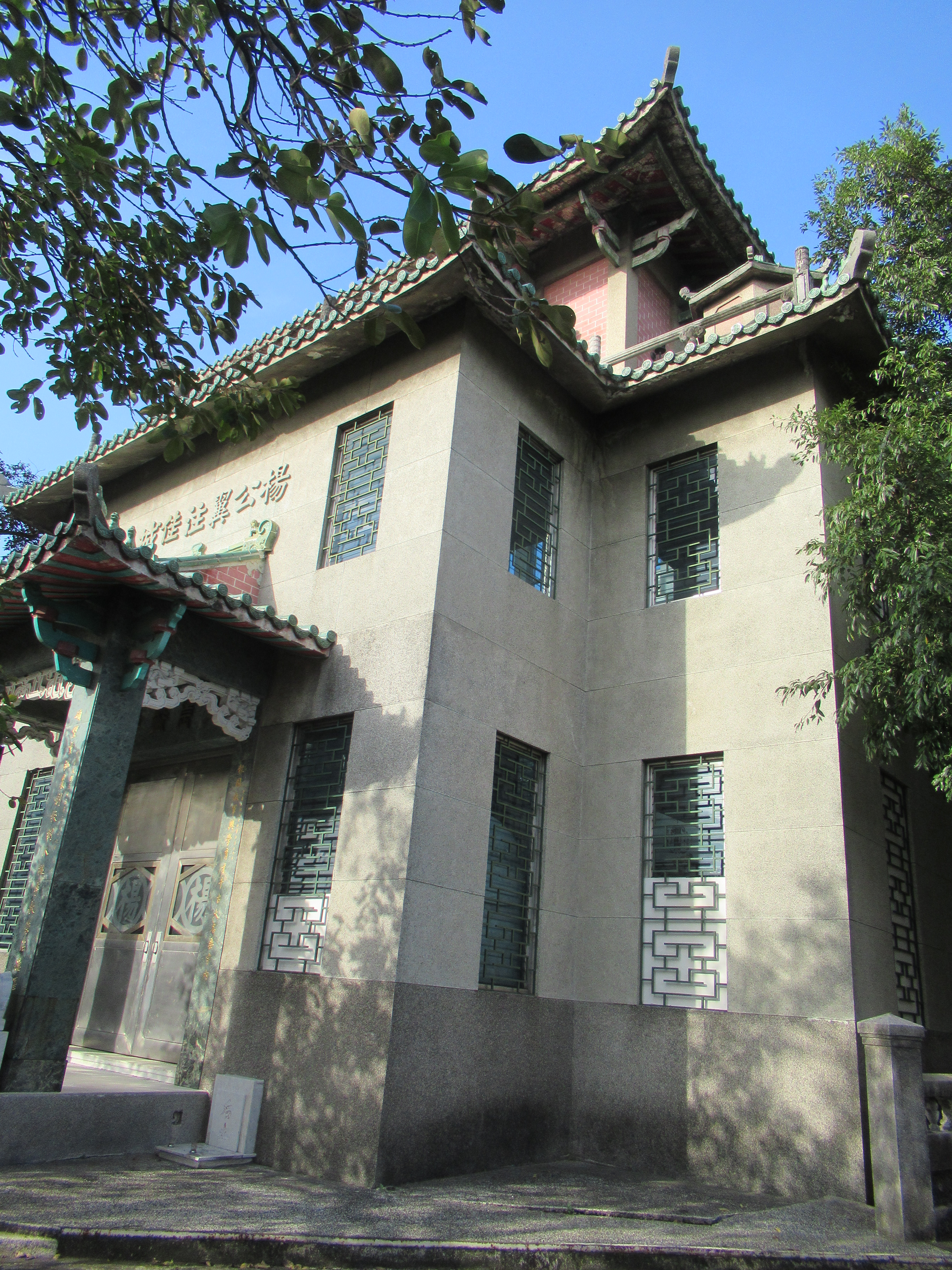
The mausoleum of Monteverde's father, Domingo Chu

Her father Yu Chu did not provide her with dowry after she decided to marry Leonardo, a San Beda University basketball star. In 1958, her brother Jesus granted her a loan to finance Regal Entertainment as distributor of Hollywood films, starting with her ₱7,000 film rights to All Mine to Give, which hit the ₱500,000 mark in the box office. In 1961, Monteverde, as adventurer earned ₱200 per day of work with her parent-in-law at Montemarte Department Store. With her two popcorn makers costing 3,000 pesos, she started her business as popcorn hawker at a Cherry Foodarama in Mandaluyong and at Good Earth Emporium at Rizal Avenue.

Her very first 1974 Magsikap: Kayod sa Araw, Kayod sa Gabi sold P4 million from a P400,000 cost. Monteverde revealed that her top films include Sister Stella L., Shake, Rattle, and Roll and Mano Po.

Monteverde produced nearly 300 films in the Philippines from the early 1960s. She operated Regal Entertainment for many years. The Mano Po film series, which began in 2002 and was produced by her filmmaking firm, paid tribute to her Chinese Filipino roots and became a hit in various local markets.

In August 1996 she invested much of her wealth into hotels in Quezon City. She opened the Imperial Palace Suites on the site of an old gasoline station at the corner of Tomas Morato Avenue and Timog Avenue in Quezon City.

In 2000, she received the Lifetime Achievement Award from the Cinemanila International Film Festival. She also received the Fernando Poe Jr. Lifetime Achievement Award in the 37th Luna Awards in 2019, the Ina ng Pelikulang Pilipino Award in 2017 and the Lifetime Achievement Award in 2023 from the Film Development Council of the Philippines.

My Future You was one of the last films greenlit by Monteverde. Her daughter Roselle Teo stated that the romantic comedy will honour her mother and father Leonardo "Remy". Untold will now be the final film of Monteverde.

== Personal life and death ==
Monteverde was born in Bicol to Domingo Yu Chu, a copra magnate, philanthropist, educator, and founder of the Shang Yi Zhong Xue Chinese school and Profetiza Buban Yu. She was the youngest of 12 siblings. She was the mother of five children, including UP Fighting Maroons men's basketball head coach Goldwin Monteverde. Her husband, Leonardo "Remy" G. Monteverde (born December 21, 1936) owned several Art Deco theatres in Manila. He died of pneumonia on July 29, 2024, aged 87–88.

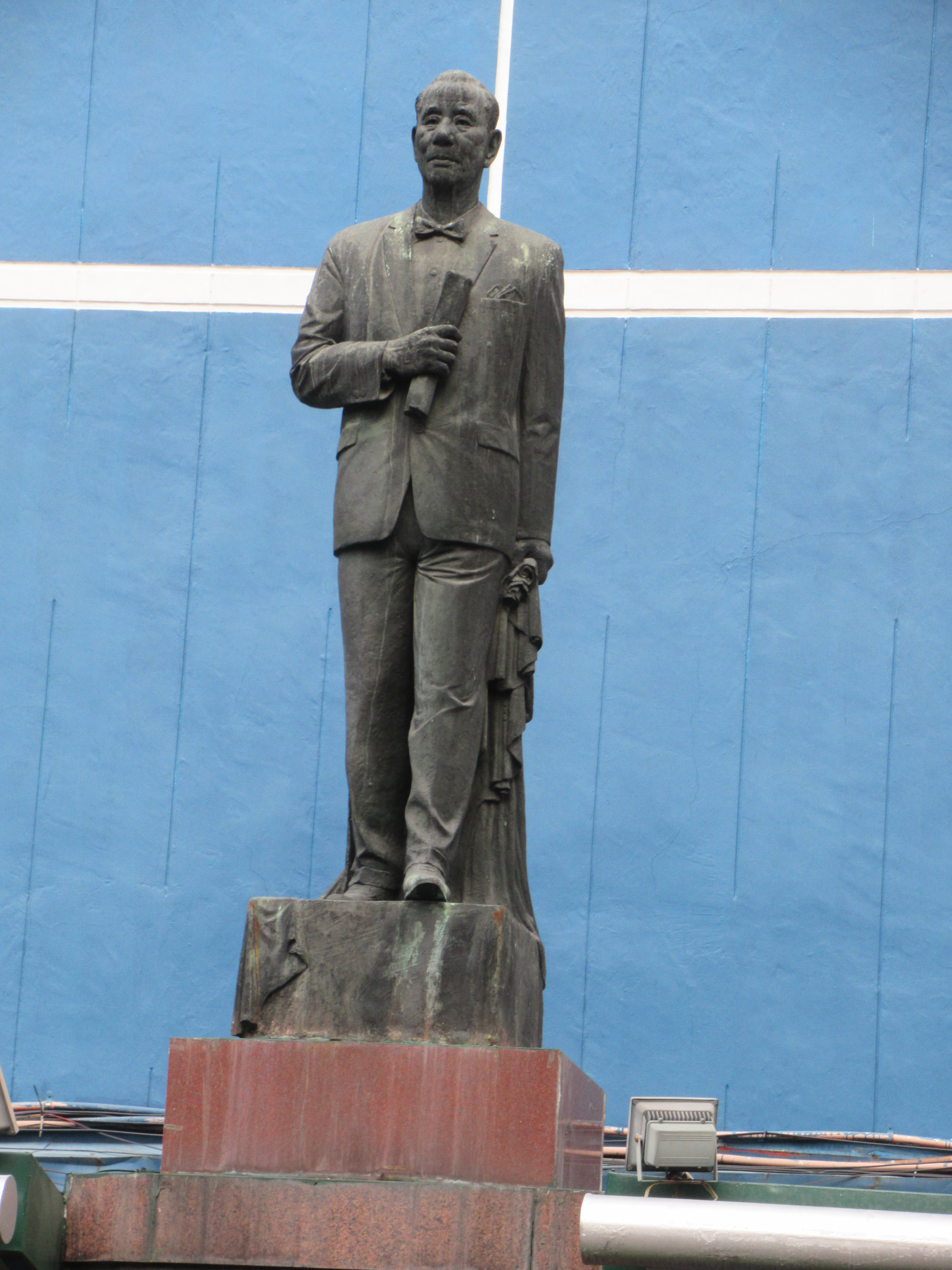
Domingo Yu Chu (尚一中学 Tondo)

She studied at St. Scholastica's College, Manila and Miriam College. Monteverde and her family resided in Greenhills, San Juan. She had seven grandchildren and a great-grandchild.

Monteverde was a devout Roman Catholic, crediting the success of her company's films to God, stating in 1986 that "I pray hard, I don't believe in psychics and fortune tellers anymore. I have befriended my enemies and helped those who need help.... And now I'm positive about life. If I have personal problems, I keep them to myself and I pray hard to God."

Monteverde died in Manila on August 4, 2024, at the age of 85, less than a week after the death of her husband and 15 days before her 86th birthday. She was buried at the Heritage Park in Taguig.

== Awards ==
Year	Award-giving body	Category	Work	Result
2002	Metro Manila Film Festival	Best Original Story (with Roy Iglesias)	Mano Po	Won
2003	Metro Manila Film Festival	Best Original Story (with Roy Iglesias)	Mano Po 2: My Love	Won
