= 2010 FAMAS Awards =

Annual Filipino film awards ceremony

58th FAMAS Awards
- Date: Monday, December 13, 2010
- Site: GSIS Teatro, Diosdado Macapagal Boulevard, Pasay
- Hosted by: Issa Litton, Arnel Ignacio and John Nite

Highlights
- Best Picture: Dukot
- Most awards: Dukot (6)
- Most nominations: Ang Panday (14)

The 58th Filipino Academy of Movie Arts and Sciences Awards Night was held on December 13, 2010 at GSIS Teatro, Diosdado Macapagal Boulevard, Pasay.

Dukot, by ATD Entertainment, is the recipient of this edition's FAMAS Award for Best Picture.

== Awards ==
=== Major Awards ===
Winners are listed first and highlighted with boldface.

Best Picture	Best Director
**Dukot**; Mano Po 6: A Mother's Love; Sagrada Familia; I Love You, Goodbye; In My Life; You Changed My Life; Ang Panday	**Joel Lamangan — Dukot**; Joel Lamangan — Sagrada Familia; Joel Lamangan — Mano Po 6: A Mother's Love; Laurice Guillen — I Love You, Goodbye; Mac Alejandre — Ang Panday; Olivia Lamasan — In My Life; Brillante Mendoza — Kinatay
Best Actor	Best Actress
**Allen Dizon — Dukot**; Piolo Pascual — Love Me Again (Land Down Under); Coco Martin — Kinatay; John Lloyd Cruz — You Changed My Life; John Lloyd Cruz — In My Life; Gabby Concepcion — I Love You, Goodbye; Ramon "Bong" Revilla — Ang Panday	**Lovi Poe — Sagrada Familia**; Iza Calzado — Dukot; Janice de Belen — Last Viewing; Sarah Geronimo — You Changed My Life; Angelica Panganiban — I Love You, Goodbye; Eugene Domingo — Kimmy Dora; Sharon Cuneta — Mano Po 6: A Mother's Love
Best Supporting Actor	Best Supporting Actress
**Emilio Garcia — Sagrada Familia**; Baron Geisler — Nandito Ako Nagmamahal Sa'Yo; Phillip Salvador — Ang Panday; Robert Arevalo — Dukot; Ricky Davao — Love Me Again (Land Down Under); Luis Manzano — In My Life	**Gloria Diaz — Sagrada Familia**; Manilyn Reynes — Ded na si Lolo; Rhian Ramos — Ang Panday; Gina Alajar — Dukot; Heart Evangelista — Mano Po 6: A Mother's Love; Dimples Romana — Love Me Again (Land Down Under); Kim Chiu — I Love You, Goodbye
Best Child Actor	Best Child Actress
**Robert Villar — Ang Panday**; Nash Aguas — Kamoteng Kahoy; Robert Villar — Kamoteng Kahoy; BJ Forbes — Ded na si Lolo; Nash Aguas — Love Me Again (Land Down Under); JP Mesde — Tulak	**Mara Panganiban — The Last Viewing**; Justine Rose Rosal — Sagrada Familia
Best Screenplay	Best Cinematography
**R.J. Nuevas, Carlo J. Caparas — Ang Panday**; Roy Iglesias — Mano Po 6: A Mother's Love; Bonifacio Ilagan — Dukot; Raymond Lee, Olivia M. Lamasan — In My Life; Arah Jell Badayos, Jewel C. Castro — Love Me Again (Land Down Under); Armando Lao — Kinatay; Chie Floresca, Norissa R. Soriano, Carmi Raymundo — You Changed My Life	**Monino Duque — Dukot**; Charlie Peralta — In My Life; Shayne Sarte — Kimmy Dora; Charlie Peralta — Love Me Again (Land Down Under); Gary Gardoce — Last Viewing; Regiben Romana — Ang Panday; Lee Meily — I Love You, Goodbye
Best Art Direction	Best Sound
**Edgar Martin Littaua — Dukot**; Edgar Martin Littaua — I Love You, Goodbye; Elfren Vibar — In My Life; Richard Somes — Ang Panday; Brillante Mendoza — Kinatay; Tony Chiong — Last Viewing; Adelina Leung — Kimmy Dora	**Ditoy Aguila — Ang Panday**; Albert Michael Idioma — In My Life; Albert Michael Idioma — Kimmy Dora; Alfredo Ongleo — Dukot; Pepe Manikan — Last Viewing; Albert Michael Idioma — I Love You, Goodbye
Best Editing	Best Story
**Charliebebs Gohetia — Dukot**; Marya Ignacio — Ang Panday; Lee Mi Soon — Last Viewing; Manet A. Dayrit, Efren Jarlego — I Love You, Goodbye; Vanessa De Leon — Kimmy Dora; Kats Serraon — Kinatay; Marya Ignacio — In My Life	**Carlo J. Caparas — Ang Panday**; Raquel Villavicencio, Joel Lamangan — Sagrada Familia; Romualdo Avellanosa, Roni Bertubin — Last Viewing; Roy Iglesias — Mano Po 6: A Mother's Love; Vanessa R. Valdez — I Love You, Goodbye; Joel Lamangan, Bonifacio Ilagan — Dukot; Raymond Lee, Olivia M. Lamasan — In My Life
Best Theme Song	Best Musical Score
**"Panday" — Ang Panday (Ely Buendia)**; "Yaya Angelina" — Yaya and Angelina: The Spoiled Brat Movie (Ogie Alcasid); "Nandito Ako" — Nandito Ako Nagmamahal Sa'Yo (Frank Lee Lorenzo); ""I Don't Want You To Go"" — Love Me Again (Land Down Under) (Piolo Pascual); "Ang Buhay Nga Naman" — Ded na si Lolo (Noel Cabangon); "You Changed My Life in a Moment" — You Changed My Life (Sarah Geronimo)	**Von de Guzman — I Love You, Goodbye**; Nonong Buencamino — In My Life; Brian Cua — Kimmy Dora; Von de Guzman — Ang Panday; Pepe Manikan — Last Viewing; Lucien Letaba — Dukot

=== Special awards ===
**Lou Salvador Sr. Memorial Award**

- Lou Veloso

**German Moreno Youth Achievement Award**

- Enchong Dee
- Joshua Dionisio
- Erich Gonzales
- Barbie Forteza
- Andi Eigenmann
- Bea Binene
- Jake Vargas
- Matteo Guidicelli

**Golden Artist Award**

- Sharon Cuneta

**Exemplary Achievement Award**

- Dolphy

**Presidential Award**

- Herbert Bautista

**FAMAS Lifetime Achievement Award**

- Rustica Carpio

**FAMAS Hall of Fame**

- Jesse Lucas (Musical Score)
