= JB Magsaysay =

Filipino actor-politician

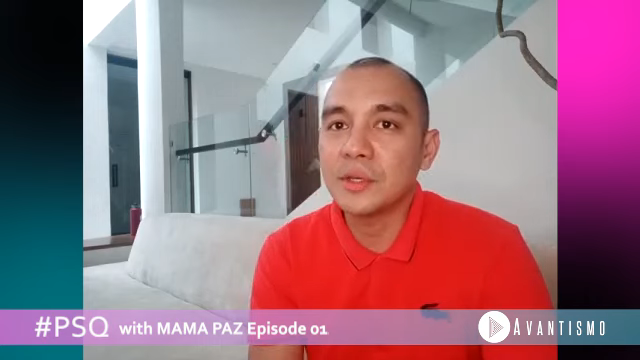
- JB Magsaysay in 2020
- Born: Joseph Benedict Aquino-Magsaysay; July 6, 1980 (age 46); San Juan, La Union, Philippines
- Occupations: Actor, politician, and businessman
- Years active: 2001; 2005–2010
- Spouse: Maria Paz "Maripaz" Ortega
- Relatives: Coleen Garcia (stepdaughter)

Joseph Benedict Aquino Magsaysay, also known as JB Magsaysay (born July 6, 1980), is a Filipino actor, a politician, a businessman and was one of the 13 housemates of ABS-CBN's Pinoy Big Brother, Season 1. He was the second evicted housemate on his 35th day in Pinoy Big Brother's house.

Magsaysay was born in San Juan, La Union; he is a grand nephew of former Philippine president Ramon Magsaysay, and also the first cousin of the late Ram Revilla. He graduated with a college degree at the Philippine School of Business Administration in Quezon City. He entered politics for his hometown on 2007 local elections but he lost.

== Career ==
After his second eviction from Big Brother house. JB was first TV guesting on ABS-CBN programs Nginiig, Ok Fine Whatever, Private Conversation with Boy Abunda, Y Speak, Star Magic Presents and others.

His cameo role as an antagonist in an action-packed TV series Palos with Cesar Montano and Jake Cuenca.

Then his first movie co-starrer with Bong Revilla Jr. in an action-adventure movie of the Metro Manila Film Festival 2009 Ang Panday.

== Filmography ==
=== Film ===
Year	Title	Role
2009	Ang Panday	Benito

=== Television ===
Year	Title	Role
2001	Subic Bay	Houseboy
2005	Pinoy Big Brother	Himself / Housemate
2005	Nginiig	Various
2006	Komiks: Inday Bote	Various
2006	Your Song Presents: Can't Let You Go	Jason
2006	Star Magic Presents: Miss... Mistress	Governor
2008	Palos	Dr. Samuel Chan
2009	Maynila	Mark
2009	Lipgloss	Joel
2010	Ang Darling Kong Aswang	Pinoy Dracula
