= Moymoy Palaboy =

Filipino comic and singing duo

- Origin: Pasay, Philippines
- Occupation: Lip syncing comedians
- Years active: 2007–present
- Label: Sony Music Philippines
- Members: James Ronald Obeso Macasero (Moymoy); Rodfil Obeso Macasero (Roadfill)

Moymoy Palaboy is a Filipino comic and singing duo known for their uploaded lip sync videos in YouTube. The duo consists of the Macasero brothers, James Ronald (a.k.a. Moymoy, born on July 17, 1983, in Pasay) and Rodfil (a.k.a. Roadfill, born on August 28, 1985, in Pasay). They are now GMA Network contract artists.

== Biographies ==
Before James and Rodfil's career started, their mother, Nenita Obeso developed breast cancer. When she died in 2006, their aunt, Benny Obeso (fondly called Mama Auntie by her nephews) took them in.

The brothers went to the same public elementary and high schools in Pasay. For their college education, they had both attended the Polytechnic University of the Philippines. James majored in Broadcasting, but dropped out of college to find a job and help his "stepmother". His brother Rodfil finished a Business Management course and used to work as an in-house sales representative at the Philippine Long Distance Telephone Company (PLDT). Rodfil is known to be fond of singing at videoke bars, playing video games, and has a fascination with electronic gadgets.

James Ronald auditioned for the singing contest and television program Star In A Million but failed to qualify. He used to perform in a band called Pasionista, until he decided to leave in favor of being cast in a television show with his younger brother.

== Career ==
The brothers started to upload their lip sync videos via YouTube in 2007. In 2008, their videos and their YouTube profile garnered over 5 million hits and they have more than 554,000 subscribers.

Most of their videos were shot at home, as seen in the background, where their aunt 'Mama Auntie' also appears. They use their laptop and cellphone cameras to shoot the videos. Aside from their aunt, other guests who appeared in their videos include their friends and Philippine TV celebrities. Among their most popular YouTube videos are "Everybody (Backstreet's Back)" (by Backstreet Boys), "Wannabe" (by Spice Girls) and "MariMar" (by Thalía).

The duo made their first TV appearance in GMA Network's Bubble Gang on June 27, 2008, and had since been regulars in that show, until they left the show in 2019 and 2022. Aside from Bubble Gang, they had been seen in MTV's Campus Crashers. In their TV interviews, their real voices were masked using high-pitched tones or other voices through the microphone so that their real voices would remain a mystery.

Due to their popularity, they are now contract artists in GMA Artist Center and recently appearing as regulars in SOP Rules. The duo became recording artists and their first song, "Kapit" (Dayo soundtrack), used their real singing voices. In March 2009, they released their own debut album entitled Uploaded under Sony BMG and their first single was "Lumayo Ka Man sa Laklak", a parody where the lyrics of Teeth's song "Laklak" is sung to the tune of Rodel Naval's song "Lumayo Ka Man sa Akin".

The duo revealed their real voices for the first time in a March 20, 2009 episode of Bubble Gang in which they watched the IyoTube segment featuring the impersonators called "Mokmok Palabok". This marked the first acting stint of the duo on television. Their first primetime show on television is All My Life in 2009, co-starring Aljur Abrenica and Kris Bernal.

On March 26, 2009, YouTube suspended the duo's moymoypalaboy account due to copyright infringement issues over the songs used; an alternate account under the handle "moymoypalaboyteam" was since created. The original YouTube account was eventually reactivated on April 8, 2009.

In September 2010, the brothers were featured in an advertisement for Coca-Cola called 'Coca-Cola Brrrr'.

In 2015, Rodfil auditioned for the first season of AXN's Asia's Got Talent along with Felicitas Garcia (also known as "Lola Biritera"), a vegetable vendor from Pasig whom Rodfil had collaborated with on YouTube since 2013, prior to the audition. The duo performed Bonnie Tyler's "Total Eclipse of the Heart" and received three out of four "yes" votes from the judges, advancing to the competition's next stage.

== Filmography ==
=== Television ===
- Bubble Gang
  - Moymoy (2008–2019)
  - Rodfill (2008–2022)
- SOP Rules
- Eat Bulaga
- Maynila (themselves)
- MTV: Campus Crashers
- All My Life (Toto and Caloy)
- Magpakailanman
- Party Pilipinas
- Pepito Manaloto
- Diva (themselves)
- Spooky Nights Presents: The Ringtone (2011) (2 clowns)
- Manny Many Prizes (hosts)
- IBILIB: Wonders of Horus (2012) (co-hosts)
- The Ryzza Mae Show (guest performers)
- Sunday All Stars (guest performers)
- Sabado Badoo
- Wagas
- Ismol Family
- Sunday PinaSaya (guest performers)
- Vampire ang Daddy Ko
- Hay, Bahay!
- Dear Uge
- Conan, My Beautician
- Studio 7 (guest performers)
- Daig Kayo Ng Lola Ko
- All Out Sundays (guest performers)

=== Film ===
- Dayo: Sa Mundo ng Elementalia (2008) (Tiyanaks, special voice guests)
- Father Jejemon (2010)
- Udin Cari Alamat Palsu (2012)
- Boy Pick-Up: The Movie (2012)

== Discography ==
- Dayo: Sa Mundo ng Elementalia Soundtrack (2008)
  - "Kapit"
- Moymoy Palaboy: Uploaded (2009), Musiko Records, Sony Music

== Awards ==
Year	Award-Giving Body	Category	Work	Result
2009	GMMSF Box-Office Entertainment Awards	Most Popular Novelty Singer		Won

== See also ==
- List of YouTube celebrities
