= IBilib =

Philippine television infotainment show

iBilib
- Title card since 2024
- Genre: Infotainment
- Written by: Ferdie Aguas; Joseph Balboa; Mike Rivera
- Directed by: Rico Gutierrez
- Presented by: Chris Tiu; Moymoy Palaboy; Shaira Diaz
- Country of origin: Philippines
- Original language: Tagalog

Production
- Executive producer: Agnes T. Suriaga
- Production locations: Studio 4, GMA Network Center, Quezon City, Philippines
- Editor: Den Valenzuela
- Camera setup: Multiple-camera setup
- Running time: 30 minutes
- Production company: GMA Entertainment Group

Original release
- Network: GMA Network
- Release: January 29, 2012 – present

iBilib (transl. iBelieve) is a Philippine television infotainment show broadcast by GMA Network. Originally hosted by Chris Tiu and Moymoy Palaboy, it premiered on January 29, 2012. Tiu and Shaira Diaz currently serve as the hosts.

== Premise ==
The show features scientific experiments and showcases scientific facts and theories surrounding everyday events presented in a similar manner as seen on Japan's science television show Wonders of Horus.

== Hosts ==
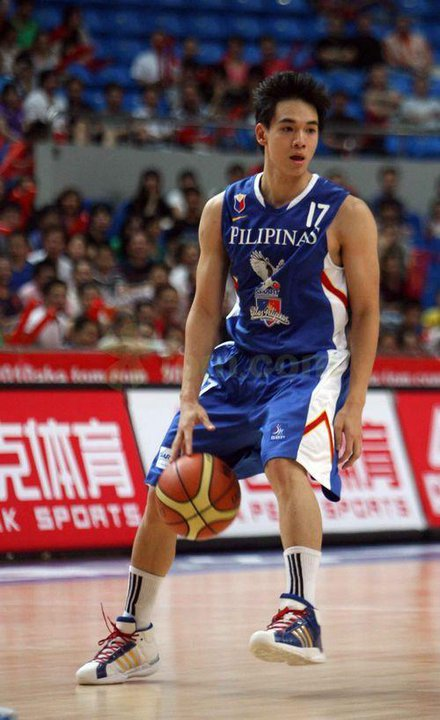
Chris Tiu serves as a host.

- Chris Tiu
- Moymoy Palaboy
- Shaira Diaz (since 2020)

Recurring hosts

- Angel Guardian
- Chariz Solomon
- Joyce Ching
- Ayra Mariano
- Jan Manual
- Ashley Ortega
- Heart Evangelista
- Alodia Gosiengfiao
- Solenn Heussaff
- Devon Seron
- Kyline Alcantara
- Therese Malvar
- Thea Tolentino
- Isabelle Daza

== Production ==
Principal photography was halted in March 2020 due to the enhanced community quarantine in Luzon caused by the COVID-19 pandemic. The show resumed its programming on September 27, 2020.

== Ratings ==
According to AGB Nielsen Philippines' Mega Manila household television ratings, the pilot episode of iBilib earned a 19% rating.

== Accolades ==
Accolades received by iBilib
Year	Award	Category	Recipient	Result	Ref.
2012	Anak TV Seal Awards	Most Well-Liked Program	iBilib	Won	
2012	26th PMPC Star Awards for Television	Best Educational/Children's Program Host	Chris Tiu	Nominated	
2013	US International Film and Video Festival	Certificate for Creative Excellence, Children's Entertainment category	iBilib	Won	
2014	Golden Screen TV Awards	Outstanding Educational Program	iBilib	Nominated	
2014	Golden Screen TV Awards	Outstanding Educational Program Host	Chris Tiu	Nominated	
2014	28th PMPC Star Awards for Television	Outstanding Educational Program Host	Chris Tiu Moymoy Palaboy	Nominated	
2015	29th PMPC Star Awards for Television	Outstanding Educational Program Host	Chris Tiu Moymoy Palaboy	Nominated	
2016	30th PMPC Star Awards for Television	Outstanding Educational Program Host	Chris Tiu	Nominated	
2017	31st PMPC Star Awards for Television	Best Educational Program	iBilib	Nominated	
2017	31st PMPC Star Awards for Television	Best Educational Program Host	Chris Tiu	Nominated	
2019	Anak TV Seal Awards		iBilib	Won	
2024	Asian Academy Creative Awards	Best Children's Programme	iBilib	Won	
2025	36th PMPC Star Awards for Television	Best Educational Program	iBilib	Pending	
