= 2008 Metro Manila Film Festival =

Film festival edition

- Date: December 25, 2008 to January 7, 2009
- Site: Manila

Highlights
- Best Picture: Baler
- Most awards: Baler (10)

Television coverage
- Network: C/S 9

The 2008 Metro Manila Film Festival started from December 25, 2008, to January 7, 2009.

This year marks the return of the Escalera brothers in Iskul Bukol 20 Years After (Ungasis and Escaleras Adventure) and the hardworking mother, Ina Montecillo in Ang Tanging Ina Ninyong Lahat.

Compared to last year's nine official entries, however, this year has only eight, all of which are being shown simultaneously during the 10-day run of the film fest. The lineup includes four comedy movies, two dramatic flicks, a horror trilogy and a digital animated film. It is expected to run from December 25, 2008, to January 7, 2009. All official entries are open on Christmas Day.

Viva Films' Baler, which aims to retell a contentious event of the Philippine revolution that happened in the church of San Luis de Tolosa in Baler, Aurora from July 1998 to June 1899, won ten awards including the Best Picture, Best Actress for Anne Curtis, Best Director for Mark Meily and the Gatpuno Antonio J. Villegas Cultural Awards among others.

The entry with the second most awards was the animated film Dayo: Sa Mundo ng Elementalia, which won four awards including the Best Visual Effects for Robert Quilao, Best Musical Score for Jessie Lasaten, Best Theme Song entitled "Lipad" written by Jessie Lasaten and Artemio Abad Jr., and performed by Lea Salonga, as long as the Best Sound Production for Albert Idioma and Wally Dellosa.

This year's box office top grossers, Star Cinema's Ang Tanging Ina N'yong Lahat and the OctoArts Films-M-Zet Productions-APT Entertainment collaboration Iskul Bukol 20 Years After won Second and Third Festival's Best Picture awards respectively.

== Entries ==
All eight films included in the competition are being simultaneously shown from December 25, 2008.

Title	Starring	Studio	Director	Genre
Baler	Anne Curtis, Jericho Rosales, Rio Locsin, Phillip Salvador, Nikki Bacolod, Carlo Aquino	Viva Communications	Mark Meily	Drama, Romance, War
Dayo: Sa Mundo ng Elementalia	Nash Aguas, Katrina Legaspi, Michael V., Noel Trinidad, Nova Villa, Pokwang, Johnny Delgado	Cutting Edge Productions	Robert Quilao	Animation, Adventure, Fantasy
Desperadas 2	Ruffa Gutierrez, Rufa Mae Quinto, Iza Calzado, Marian Rivera, Ogie Alcasid, Will Devaughn, Nova Villa	Regal Entertainment	Joel Lamangan	Comedy, Romance
Iskul Bukol 20 Years After: The Ungasis and Escaleras Adventure	Vic Sotto, Joey de Leon, Tito Sotto, Sharon Cuneta, Nicole Uysiuseng, Keempee de Leon, Bianca King, Francine Prieto, Benjie Paras	OctoArts Films	Tony Y. Reyes	Action, Adventure, Comedy
Magkaibigan	Jinggoy Estrada, Christopher de Leon, Dawn Zulueta, AJ Perez, Empress Schuck, Maricel Laxa	Maverick Films	Jose Javier Reyes	Drama
One Night Only	Katrina Halili, Alessandra de Rossi, Diana Zubiri, Jennylyn Mercado, Valerie Concepcion, Jon Avila, Ricky Davao, Empoy Marquez, Jayson Gainza, Joross Gamboa, Ogie Diaz, Chokoleit	Canary Films	Jose Javier Reyes	Comedy
Shake, Rattle & Roll X	Marian Rivera, Diana Zubiri, Jennica Garcia, Kim Chiu, Gerald Anderson, Jean Garcia, Mylene Dizon, JC De Vera, Roxanne Guinoo, Denise Laurel, Wendell Ramos	Regal Entertainment	Mike Tuviera and Topel Lee	Horror, Comedy, Fantasy
Ang Tanging Ina N'yong Lahat	Ai-Ai delas Alas, Eugene Domingo, Shaina Magdayao, Carlo Aquino, Serena Dalrymple, Alwyn Uytingco, Jiro Manio	Star Cinema	Wenn V. Deramas	Comedy

== Awards ==
The awards night of 2008 Metro Manila Film Festival was held on December 27, 2008, at Harbor Garden Tent, Sofitel Philippine Plaza, Manila. The criteria that were used in the selection were: story, creativity, commercial viability, Filipino cultural values, global appeal and innovativeness. Historical film Baler won ten awards, including the Best Picture and Best Actress for Anne Curtis. Animated film Dayo: Sa Mundo ng Elementalia received four awards, including the Best Theme Song, "Lipad", performed by Lea Salonga. Sexy-comedy film One Night Only got two awards while Magkaibigan, Desperadas 2, and Shake, Rattle & Roll X won one each. Iskul Bukol: 20 Years After and Ang Tanging Ina N'yong Lahat were the only two entries that won nothing besides the Third and Second Best Pictures respectively.

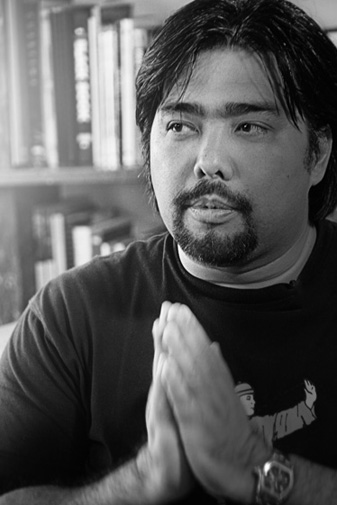
Mark Meily, Best Director winner

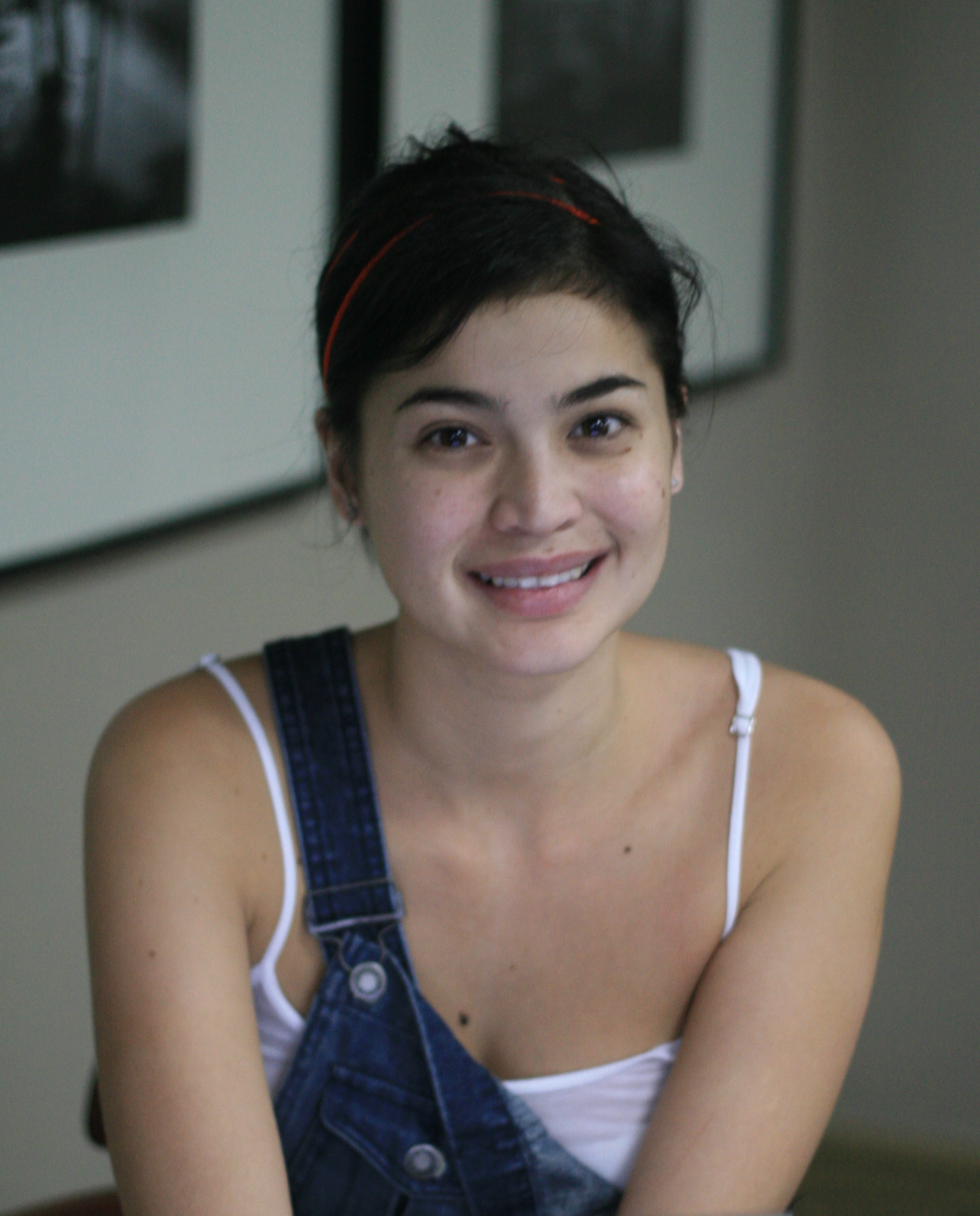
Anne Curtis, Best Actress winner

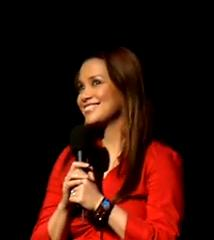
Lea Salonga, Best Theme Song performer

Best Picture	Best Director
Baler - Viva Communications; Ang Tanging Ina N'yong Lahat - Star Cinema (2nd Best Picture); Iskul Bukol 20 Years After - Octoarts Films, M-Zet Productions and APT Entertainment (3rd Best Picture)	Mark Meily - Baler
Best Actor	Best Actress
Christopher de Leon - Magkaibigan; Jinggoy Estrada - Magkaibigan; Jericho Rosales - Baler	Anne Curtis - Baler; Dawn Zulueta - Magkaibigan; Maricel Laxa - Magkaibigan; Ai-Ai delas Alas - Ang Tanging Ina N'yong Lahat
Best Supporting Actor	Best Supporting Actress
Phillip Salvador - Baler	Manilyn Reynes - One Night Only
Best Cinematography	Best Production Design
Lee Meily - Baler	Aped Santos - Baler
Best Child Performer	Best Editing
Robert Villar - Shake, Rattle & Roll X	Danny Anonuevo - Baler
Best Original Story	Best Screenplay
Jose Javier Reyes - One Night Only	Roy Iglesias - Baler
Best Original Theme Song	Best Musical Score
Jessie Lasaten and Artemio Abad Jr. ("Lipad" - performed by Lea Salonga) - Dayo: Sa Mundo ng Elementalia	Jessie Lazatin - Dayo: Sa Mundo ng Elementalia
Best Visual Effects	Best Make-up Artist
Robert Quilao - Dayo: Sa Mundo ng Elementalia	Noli Villalobos - Desperadas 2
Best Sound Recording	Best Float
Albert Idioma and Whannie Dellosa - Dayo: Sa Mundo ng Elementalia	-
Most Gender-Sensitive Film	Gatpuno Antonio J. Villegas Cultural Awards
Baler - Viva Communications	Baler - Viva Communications

== Multiple awards ==
Awards	Film
10	Baler
4	Dayo: Sa Mundo ng Elementalia
2	One Night Only

== Ceremony information ==
=== Award winners ===
Curtis won her first-ever acting award for her portrayal of Baler lass Feliza Reyes in love with a Spanish-Filipino trooper Celso Resurreccion (Jericho Rosales) in the historic siege. She states: "The fact that I was up against veteran actresses, who have won numerous awards in the past, made this trophy even more meaningful..." She competed with veteran actresses Ai-Ai delas Alas (Ang Tanging Ina N'yong Lahat), Maricel Laxa and Dawn Zulueta (both for Magkaibigan), among others, for the Best Actress title. She adds: "This is also for Echo (Rosales' nickname), who also worked really hard for this film. He's one of the best actors I know" as she told the Philippine Daily Inquirer shortly after the awards ceremony held at the Sofitel Hotel in Pasay.

In addition, Meily earned his second MMFF Best Director award after winning the same plum for Crying Ladies back in 2003. His wife Lee also took home her first MMFF award. Christopher de Leon, meanwhile, received his eighth festival Best Actor award, the most by any artist in its 34-year history, for a role inspired by the late Rudy Fernandez in the Maverick Films drama Magkaibigan opposite last year's awardee Jinggoy Estrada.

Comedian-TV host Manilyn Reynes pulled a surprise when she was named Best Supporting Actress for her portrayal as a lesbian talent coordinator in Canary Films sex comedy One Night Only, which also won Best Original Story for its director Jose Javier Reyes. Reyes states: "She's a last minute replacement..." as he accepted the award in Manilyn's behalf. He adds: "I did not regret asking her to be a part of this film."

Newcomer Robert Villar, better known in the fantasy series Dyesebel as the mermaid's trusted child friend "Buboy", won Best Child Performer in Regal Films horror franchise Shake, Rattle & Roll X. Regal's other festival entry, Desperadas 2, on the other hand, also won one award: Best Make-Up for Noli Villalobos.

== Reception ==
=== Critical ===
As box-office receipts for the 2008 Metro Manila Film Festival (MMFF) showed substantial growth over the previous year, questions concerning credibility and film quality issues remain. In an article in the Philippine Daily Inquirer, writer Rita Asilo stated that the MMFF organizers' move of encouraging producers to make more movies by giving tax-based incentives even to poorly made films could be viewed as a bad example. She also states that moviegoers cannot be educated by equating noble intention or commercial viability with quality. If the trend continues, more moviegoers would insist that the stranglehold that MMFF has on play dates and theatrical distribution during the Christmas season should end. Ultimately, the festival generated a grand total of P450,000,000 in ticket sales, an all-time record high.

== Box Office gross ==
Entry	Gross Ticket Sales				
Entry	December 25	December 26	December 29	December 31	January 7
Ang Tanging Ina N'yong Lahat	₱ 20,900,000*	₱ 41,000,000*	₱ 87,900,000*	₱ 102,500,000*	₱ 171,584,550*
Iskul Bukol 20 Years After	₱ 18,900,000	₱ 35,600,000	₱ 65,100,000	₱ 72,600,000	₱ 107,529,991
Shake, Rattle & Roll X	₱ 13,100,000	₱ 22,900,000	₱ 40,500,000	₱ 45,700,000	₱ 68,683,494
Desperadas 2: All They Need is Love	₱ 7,000,000	₱ 12,500,000	₱ 23,600,000	₱ 27,300,000	₱ 49,284,523
Baler	₱ 5,300,000	₱ 15,200,000	₱ 21,300,000	₱ 24,500,000	₱ 35,815,696
One Night Only	₱ 1,500,000	₱ 2,700,000	₱ 4,900,000	₱ 5,700,000	₱ 10,503,089
Dayo: Sa Mundo ng Elementalia	₱ 1,200,000	₱ 2,200,000	₱ 3,700,000	₱ 4,100,000	₱ 5,291,448
Magkaibigan	₱ 600,000	₱ 1,000,000	₱ 1,500,000	₱ 1,600,000	₱ 2,148,843
				TOTAL	₱ 450,841,634

Preceded by 2007 Metro Manila Film Festival	Metro Manila Film Festival; 2008	Succeeded by 2009 Metro Manila Film Festival
