= One Night Only (2008 film) =

- Theatrical release poster
- Directed by: Jose Javier Reyes
- Written by: Jose Javier Reyes
- Produced by: Orly Ilacad
- Starring: Diana Zubiri; Jennylyn Mercado; Katrina Halili; Valerie Concepcion; Alessandra De Rossi
- Cinematography: Rodolfo Y. Aves Jr.
- Edited by: Tara Illenberger
- Music by: Jesse Lucas
- Production companies: OctoArts Films; Canary Films
- Distributed by: OctoArts Films
- Release date: December 25, 2008
- Running time: 98 minutes
- Country: Philippines
- Languages: Filipino; English
- Box office: ₱10.8 million (Official MMFF run)

One Night Only is a 2008 sex comedy film written and directed by Jose Javier Reyes. The film stars Diana Zubiri, Jennylyn Mercado, Katrina Halili, Valerie Concepcion and Alessandra De Rossi. It was one of the entries in the 2008 Metro Manila Film Festival.

The film is streaming online on YouTube.

== Cast ==
Cast

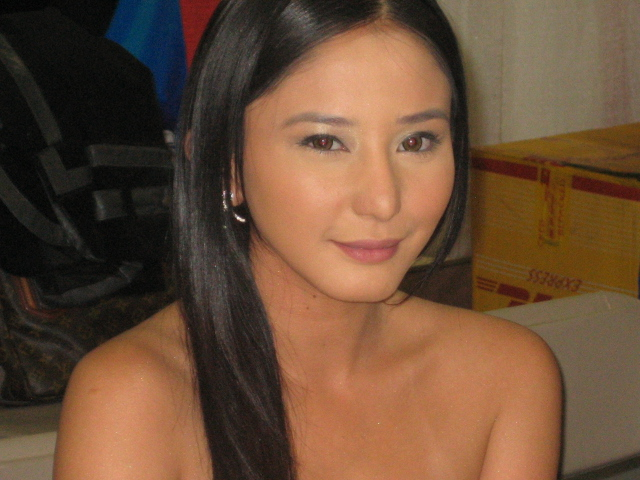
Katrina Halili portrays Jasmine.

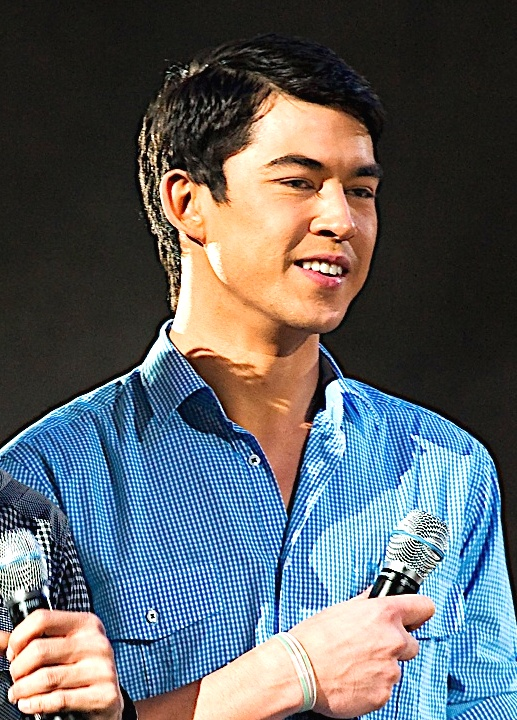
Jon Avila portrays Pons.

- Katrina Halili as Jasmine
- Diana Zubiri as Vivian
- Ricky Davao as Congressman Facundo
- Jayson Gainza as Barney
- Joross Gamboa as Nestor
- Maria Teresa Martinez as Lovely
- Chokoleit as Edward
- Bacci Garcia as Edward's assistant
- Tessie Villarama as Inday
- Manilyn Reynes as George
- Jon Avila as Pons
- Paolo Contis as Diego
- Joey David as Masahistang Larry
- Alessandra de Rossi as Angela
- Lani Tapia as Extrang Pearly
- Valerie Concepcion as Vicky
- Jennylyn Mercado as Elvie

== Production and filming ==
One Night Only was shot on Marcos Highway in Antipolo during an August weekend. One of the lead actresses, Katrina Halili, was hired for the first time to work with writer-director Jose Javier Reyes. She signed the contract on July 22, 2008, to appear in this as well as in a remake of Miss X. On August 13, 2008, Diana Zubiri and Iya Villania joined the cast, replacing Roxanne Guinoo and Angelica Panganiban. That day, director Reyes wanted to replace Diether Ocampo, while still keeping Valerie Concepcion and Joross Gamboa. A month before its release, the film had already some controversy surrounding its cast.

== Awards ==
Metro Manila Film Festival
Year	Category	Recipient(s)	Result
2008	Best Supporting Actress	Manilyn Reynes	Won
2008	Best Original Story	Jose Javier Reyes	Won
