= Shake, Rattle & Roll X =

2008 film by Michael Tuviera and Topel Lee

- Theatrical release poster
- Directed by: Michael Tuviera (segment "Emergency" and "The Engkanto Slayer"); Topel Lee (segment "Class Picture")
- Written by: Ellen Estrada (segment "Emergency"); Cheryl Narvasa (segment "Class Picture"); Penny Daza-Tuviera (segment "The Engkanto Slayer"); Alex Vicencio (segment "The Engkanto Slayer")
- Produced by: Roselle Monteverde-Teo; Lily Y. Monteverde
- Starring: Marian Rivera; Roxanne Guinoo; JC De Vera; Kim Chiu; Gerald Anderson; Jean Garcia; Wendell Ramos; Mylene Dizon; Diana Zubiri
- Cinematography: Odyssey Flores (segment "The Engkanto Slayer"); Gary Gardoce (segment "Emergency"); Ann Muñoz (segment "The Engkanto Slayer"); Luis Quirino (segment "Class Picture"); Monchie Redoble (segment "The Engkanto Slayer"); Mo Zee (segment "The Engkanto Slayer")
- Edited by: Renewin Alano (segment "The Engkanto Slayer"); Tara Illenberger (segment "Class Picture")
- Music by: Alfred Ongleo
- Production companies: Regal Entertainment; Regal Multimedia Inc.
- Release date: December 25, 2008
- Running time: 141 minutes
- Country: Philippines
- Languages: Filipino; Spanish
- Box office: ₱119 million

Shake, Rattle & Roll X is a 2008 Filipino fantasy horror anthology film produced by Regal Entertainment, and directed by Michael Tuviera and Topel Lee. It is the tenth installment of the Shake, Rattle & Roll film series following the ninth film in 2007, and the second highest-grossing film in the series. The film is an official entry to the 34th Metro Manila Film Festival. The film was a box office success, and Robert Villar won the MMFF Award for Best Child Performer. The eleventh installment, Shake, Rattle & Roll XI, was released in 2009.

The film has three segments: staff and patients face a horde of aswang inside a hospital; college students experience supernatural phenomena after uncovering a dark past from a class photo; and an engkanto slayer battles folkloric creatures.

This is also the last film appearance of actor Cris Daluz, who died in a stroke in Olongapo City, Zambales on February 12, 2009, at the age of 74.

== Plot ==
=== "Emergency" ===
At night, Jay and Dennis travel along a dark highway, accidentally running over a pregnant woman crossing the street. They immediately rush her to the hospital.

Other people in the ER were: a gay man named Julius who thinks he has a fever, an English-speaker named Ehrick who keeps complaining about the hospital's defective apparatus and a badly injured man who immediately recognizes the woman. He attempts to swipe her with his whip but soon dies.

Hospital radiologist Sarah examines the woman using an ultrasound scanner. During the examination, an eerie sound wails through the air. They discover that the infant died while inside the woman's womb. Meanwhile, Sarah goes to the bathroom where it is revealed that she is pregnant.

The woman is transferred into an isolation room. The hospital's administrator, Dr. Ignacio becomes skeptical about the true nature of the woman. They speculate that she might not be human, so he promotes this idea which enrages Sarah.

Back in the isolation room, the woman dreams of the man who tried to kill her. She gives out a very shrill cry that proves she is not human but an aswang. Together with her husband, who is also an aswang, and their race, they invade the hospital. Dr. Ignacio is the first to be killed by the aswang husband.

Jay, Sarah and the others evacuate to the upper floors as the aswangs, break in, killing patients including Julius and Ehrick. The others hide in the stock room while Jay rescues a young girl from the aswang wife.

Sarah and Jay are trapped in a locked corridor, with the beasts in pursuit. They use a defibrillator to electrocute the aswangs. Meanwhile, the hospital chaplain, Father Miguel, and Dennis are running for the water tank. Jay confesses to Sarah he still loves her and Sarah reveals that she is pregnant.

The monsters turn into more powerful creatures and launch their final attack. Father Miguel, meanwhile, blesses the water in the tank with holy water. While Jay is being attacked by the creatures, Sarah uses a fire-lit broom to activate the fire sprinkler system to destroy the aswangs. At the end, it is revealed that the baby was on the hospital's rooftop, thus avoiding getting soaked in holy water. It opens its eyes and unleashes its final scare at the viewer.

=== "Class Picture" ===
A terrified young woman running through the halls of San Selino College at night sees horrific visions of a dead student wearing an old school uniform. When she finds herself clad in the same uniform, she is scourged by an unseen force while a diabolical female laughter is heard. The young woman dies after being stoned and having her forehead sliced by a razor being held by an unknown female hand with a sleeve of a nun's habit.

Joy, Lui and their friends are graduating college students of San Selino who spend their weekend in the campus, being assigned to prepare an exhibit in exchange for lifting their organization's suspension and their clearance for graduation. On their first night, one of their classmates, Nicole, presumably the young woman in the opening, disappears without a trace.

Waking up from a nightmare, Joy confesses to her friends of what happened the previous night; hours before midnight, she picked a mysterious class picture named "Rubi 1898" in the school's storage room. The picture shows an all-female class with a nun seated at the center. The picture is seen again by Blue and Pinky when they dump garbage. Blue looks at the nun in the picture wherein the nun smiled. Suddenly, she is unknowingly captured by the same unknown force and vanishes. She finds herself clad in the old school uniform seen in the nightmare at the beginning. The spirit then kills Blue by tearing her arms apart.

Joy discovers sinister Spanish writing in a classroom window, written in blood, stating "No me mires fijamente". When the group goes to the library, they try to translate the graffiti only to fail at first. Scanning the yearbooks for information, they find "Rubi" was a class section supervised by Sister Maria Belonia. They also discover a similar class picture of the same section with a male teacher standing at the middle, where Belonia should be. The male teacher was revealed to be Virgilio, who became the substitute adviser during Belonia's absence. In the same yearbook, Joy discovers three students, namely Crisel, Sabel, and Adela, who were the missing students of the "Rubi" section.

The group finally discovers from the computer's translator that the Spanish words mean "Do not stare". They realize that the picture is a possessed photograph and that the bloody writing was a warning, stating that anyone who looks at the nun, through the cursed picture will disappear and die.

It is then revealed that Belonia must seek three students from them. Lui looks at the picture and spots their group mates in the photo; Nicole and Blue. Joy reveals that she is the next to be taken for accidentally looking at the nun before she is abducted by the same unknown force, now revealed to be Maria Belonia herself, an evil nun teacher who haunts the school after she was deemed responsible for the death of the institution's students in the Spanish colonial period.

Joy runs through the school's hallways in order to escape the wrath of Belonia. She sees the three missing students in a room being scourged by Belonia but fails to free the trio when she is glanced at by Belonia. It is revealed that Sister Belonia tortured students either for being disobedient or making the smallest of mistakes. Crisel, Sabel, and Adela, in retaliation, wrote a letter to the headmistress nun, Mother Agnes, to report Belonia's actions. Mother Agnes, upon learning this, reprimanded Sis. Belonia for her brutal and torturous manners of disciplining the three girls and her class. When the day for the class picture arrived, the headmistress realizes that their class had the aforementioned three girls missing. She then suspended Belonia from San Selino (this later explains why she utters the words often) and tells her that she cannot come back until the three students are found. In return, she committed suicide but not before swearing that she will complete her class' picture. Later on, she finds herself now clad in the old school uniform from the opening scene and when Blue was abducted by the evil nun.

Lui and Greg chase Joy but arrive too late at the school's auditorium as the doors are tightly shut and locked by the angry spirit of Belonia, who is ready to take Joy. Lui's attempts to tear the picture fail as the nun's curse remains in the picture.

Realizing this, Joy asks the help from the spirits of the three missing students. The ghosts of Crisel, Sabel and Adela reappear and tear the picture apart, banishing Belonia as the trio departs for the afterlife. The group finishes and inaugurates the exhibit, but are suspended for the unexplained disappearance of their classmates. The episode ends when the camera slowly moves toward the class picture with Sr. Belonia smiling.

=== "Nieves the Engkanto Slayer" ===
Nieves, a happy-go-lucky but a fierce engkantolarya (an Engkanto slayer) lives with her husband Adonis, an engkanto heartthrob who is kidnapped one night by an engkanto, causing Nieves to quit her job.

Meanwhile, a family from Manila moves to a house bound by a large tree. The matriarch's sister Celso, however, is brainwashed and cuts down the tree, causing him to fall ill with in unexplainable condition. Junie, Celso's nephew, goes to see Nieves, along with a young girl named Kaysee after gaining information from a resident. Nieves hesitates, but after Junie begs, offers to train them.

Kaysee and Junie trek back to Nieves's home where they are welcomed by the townsfolk, complaining about the new attacks of engkantos. The engkantolarya finally agrees to continue her post.

Junie's parents seek help from Nieves when Celso's illness worsens. Nieves explains that the tree he cut in the backyard was the home of engkanto couple Hagnaya and his wife, Wai Lana. It is also revealed that the voice that brainwashed Celso was the engkanto queen herself, Acacia.

Nieves negotiates with Wai Lana and Hagnaya, explaining that Celso did not mean to cut down the tree and offers them help to find a new home. Kaysee, who goes to walk with Junie, reveals herself as Acacia, who knocks down Junie with a fireball.

Upon waking up, Junie runs to Nieves and tells her what he saw. The engkanto slayer is given a special suit blessed by Hagnaya's clan. As they speak, Acacia ensnares the townsfolk to her lair.

Nieves confronts Acacia while Junie snaps the townsfolk out of the trance. As the two ladies fight, it is revealed that Acacia had Adonis held hostage under a hill. The engkanto queen tortures the engkantolarya mercilessly. Enraged, the Nieves throws a repellent in the air while Junie hits it with his sling-stone, killing Acacia in the process.

With Adonis back, Nieves and the townsfolk rejoice.

== Cast ==
=== Emergency ===
- Roxanne Guinoo as Dr. Sarah
- JC De Vera as Jay
- Mylene Dizon as Aswang Wife
- Wendell Ramos as Aswang Husband
- John Lapus as Julius
- Janus Del Prado as Dennis
- Denise Laurel as Emily
- Julia Chua as Yumi
- Eri Neeman as Ehrick
- Cris Daluz† as Fr. Miguel
- Dido dela Paz as Dr. Ignacio
- Therese Carlos as Yumi's mother
- Johnny Samson as Ehrick's cousin

=== Class Picture ===
- Kim Chiu as Joy
- Gerald Anderson as Lui
- Jean Garcia as Sister Maria Belonia
- IC Mendoza as Pinky
- Erich Gonzales as Anna
- Stef Prescott as Pam
- Charles Christianson as Tupak
- Eda Nolan as Blue
- Prince Stefan as Greg
- Andrea Torres as Issa
- Niña Jose as Nicole
- Ysa Villar as Sabel Mercado
- Cristine Joy Velasco as Crisel de Vera
- Czarina Gonzales as Adela Villafana
- Lollie Mara† as Mother Agnes
- Carmen del Rosario as Manang/Janitress
- Rosette Alanganan as Sister Maria Belonia's Double
- Raymond Firmo Narag as Security Guard 1
- Carlito Casas as Security Guard 2

=== Nieves the Engkanto Slayer ===
- Marian Rivera as Nieves
- Diana Zubiri as Acacia
- Jennica Garcia as Kaysee
- Mart Escudero as Celso
- Luis Alandy as Dario
- Desiree Del Valle as May Ann
- Iwa Moto as Wai Lana
- Marco Alcaraz as Hagnaya
- Robert Villar as Junie
- Pekto as Adonis
- Malou Crisologo as Aling Tasing
- Raul Dillio as Kapre
- Kristel Fulgar as Jennylyn
- Antonette Garcia as Agnes/Tindera
- Rowena Vargas as Tindera
- Sabrina Man as Kid 1
- Thalia Delos Reyes as Kid 2

== Reception ==
=== Critical response ===
Shake, Rattle and Roll X was viewed as a "mixed bag of stories that range in quality from poor to somewhat okay." The first story, "Emergency" lacked narrative, and had unnecessary character details that affected the pace. "Class Picture" was viewed as having strong Asian horror elements although its script failed to keep pace with the direction. The last entry, "Nieves" is described to be entertaining due to its solid script, carefully blended mythology with humor and an unforgettable performance from Marian Rivera. What made it unique was its use of comedy, which made it comparable to Buffy the Vampire Slayer.

The film was said to "reinvent myths surrounding the aswang."

=== Box office ===
- ₱13,100,000 (December 25, 2008)
- ₱22,900,000 (December 26, 2008)
- ₱35,400,000 (December 28, 2008)
- ₱40,500,000 (December 29, 2008)
- ₱45,700,000 (December 31, 2008)
- ₱68,000,000 (January 7, 2009)

== Accolades ==
Robert Villar was awarded for Best Child Performer for playing the role of Junie in the film.

Year	Award-giving body	Category	Recipient	Result
2008	Metro Manila Film Festival	Best Child Performer	Robert Villar	Won

== See also ==
- Shake, Rattle & Roll (film series)
- List of ghost films
