= Shake, Rattle & Roll XI =

2009 Filipino film

- Theatrical release poster
- Directed by: Rico Gutierrez (segment "Diablo"); Don Michael Perez (segment "Ukay-Ukay"); Jessel Monteverde (segment "Lamanglupa")
- Written by: Elmer Gatchalian (segments "Diablo" and "Lamanglupa"); Gina Marissa Tagasa (segment "Ukay-Ukay"); Renato Custodio (segment "Lamanglupa")
- Produced by: Roselle Monteverde-Teo; Lily Y. Monteverde
- Starring: Ruffa Gutierrez; Mark Anthony Fernandez; Maja Salvador; Rayver Cruz; Zoren Legaspi; Iya Villania; Jennica Garcia; Mart Escudero
- Cinematography: Pao Orendain (segment "Diablo"); Louie Quirino (segments "Ukay-Ukay" and "Lamanglupa")
- Edited by: Jay Valencia (segments "Ukay-Ukay" and "Lamanglupa")
- Music by: Richard Gonzales (segment "Diablo"); Alfred Dodoy Ongleo (segments "Ukay-Ukay" and "Lamanglupa")
- Production companies: Regal Entertainment; Regal Multimedia Inc.
- Release date: December 25, 2009
- Running time: 122 minutes
- Country: Philippines
- Language: Filipino
- Box office: ₱77.6 million (Official 2009 MMFF run)

Shake, Rattle & Roll XI (stylized as Shake Rattle & Ro11) is a 2009 Filipino supernatural horror anthology film produced by Regal Entertainment, and the eleventh installment of the Shake, Rattle & Roll film series, following the tenth film in 2008. It is directed by Rico Gutierrez, Don Michael Perez and Jessel Monteverde. The film features an ensemble cast including Ruffa Gutierrez, Mark Anthony Fernandez, Maja Salvador, Rayver Cruz, Zoren Legaspi, Iya Villania, Jennica Garcia and Mart Escudero. It was also distributed by Regal Entertainment, Inc. and Regal Multimedia, Inc. It was an official entry in the 2009 Metro Manila Film Festival. The film received the Festival Award for Best Make-up.

The film consists of three segments: a doctor becomes possessed by a demon after treating a sick girl; a bride encounters an evil second-hand wedding dress; and a traumatized camper is interrogated by the police after surviving an encounter with a creature.

The twelfth installment, Shake, Rattle and Roll 12, was released in 2010.

== Plot ==
=== "Diablo" ===
Claire, an unfaithful and troubled intern doctor, is assigned to treat a young girl with a deadly flu virus. Upon entering the room, the girl mistreats Claire when she tries to treat her. Before leaving, the girl begs Claire that she needs a priest to cure her, but Claire doesn't believe her and assures her that she is sick. The girl angrily shouts at her and tells Claire that she has been possessed by a demon. The girl begins to attack Claire, but she escapes and watches the girl fall out the window to her death before the girl shifts her face to Claire's.

Claire lived an unhappy life after her family were murdered by thieves, and now lives with her religious aunt Beth. Before she sleeps, she remembers her family and suffers a nightmare of the possessed girl. The next morning she began to act strangely, hearing mysterious voices and seeing ominous visions around her before she watches Ronnie, Claire's former boyfriend who is now a priest, performing mass. She even tries to convince her boyfriend Jake about her story before she mistreats him. Later before Jake leaves, he accidentally bumps with what turns out to be the possessed girl who then kills Jake.

Dr. Yulo visits Beth and discusses Claire's condition. Beth tells her about Claire's behavior and attitude; Dr. Yulo assures her that she was emotionally repressed. When Dr. Yulo enters her room and speaks to Claire about her behavior, she loses control of herself that she was possessed by a demon and attacks Dr. Yulo, who escapes as Beth watches in horror. Beth calls for Ronnie with Fr. Paul to have an exorcism for Claire but the entrance is blocked by a large mound of Catholic statues.

Before arriving at the house, they are attacked by a possessed Claire but Fr. Paul manages to say the prayers before Claire collapses. Ronnie begins to exorcise the demon in Claire's body, but fails. The demonized Claire attacks Ronnie but he manages to save himself. The demon insults him about his relationship with Claire but Ronnie tells Claire to fight herself. Claire manages to save herself from the demon and begs Ronnie to save her. The demon begins to release Claire until shards of wood and glass fly towards Ronnie, crucifying him to the wall. The demon vanishes from Claire but Ronnie dies from his injuries as Claire mourns.

Claire becomes heartbroken and guilty after Ronnie's death but changes her life. Later, Claire returns to work and begins treating a little girl. The little girl's father appears whom Claire saw Ronnie's deforming doppelganger in a vision as she screams.

=== "Ukay-Ukay" ===
Kayla plans on an engagement with Harold. While driving with her best friend and fashion designer Basti, Kayla runs over a woman. As they get out of the car, they find the woman gone but see a secondhand wedding veil before they leave. The next day she visits a local boutique, finds a secondhand wedding gown and decides to buy it. Finding it damaged, she asks Basti to fix it. The gown comes to life and kills a seamstress. While Kayla and Harold have their dinner at a restaurant, she sees an old man watching her. Later, Kayla has nightmares about a ghost and an old house. The next day, the gown attacks and kills Basti.

After the gown is delivered, Kayla starts having nightmares again. After hearing of Basti's death, the old man from the restaurant warns Kayla to stop the wedding but she disregards his warning. Kayla decides to return the gown to the store. She then later becomes suspicious of the gown that killed Basti and caused her nightmares. Harold disregards this and decides to sleep with Kayla. However, when night falls, the gown comes back and attacks Harold and Kayla, but they manage to burn it.

While searching for a church, Kayla notices a house similar to the one in her dreams, and goes inside with Harold. While investigating it, she notices a painting wherein the woman is wearing the same wedding gown that haunts her. Before the couple leave, the old man appears. Kayla, although mad at first at the old man, explains to him their current situation. The old man tells her the story of the gown. It was formerly owned by Lucia. At her wedding, Lucia waited for a long time for her groom, Joaquin. She eventually discovered that he married another woman and Lucia was left heartbroken. Out of anger, she killed Joaquin's bride and attempted to kill Joaquin but he accidentally stabbed her instead. Before dying, she cursed herself and her gown that she would kill every bride related to Joaquin's bloodline. Joaquin stopped being involved with women, but he had a relationship with a lady named Juanita. Before they ended their relationship, Juanita gave birth to a boy who is revealed to be Kayla's father. The old man reveals himself to be Joaquin and that he is Kayla's grandfather. Kayla is the first woman that was related to Joaquin's bloodline. Joaquin urges her to stop the wedding because the curse will never stop.

While designing a new wedding gown, Kayla becomes suspicious of it since it has an uncanny resemblance to the old gown, but decides to wear it. During the wedding, Lucia possesses Kayla and attempts to kill Harold but Joaquin arrives at the church and apologizes to Lucia for what he did to her, begging her to take him instead. Lucia kills Joaquin and takes his soul and herself to the afterlife.

The wedding continues and Kayla is engaged to Harold. As the guests clap for Kayla and Harold, the gown appears and walks towards them.

=== "Lamanglupa" ===
Sheila is interrogated by a policeman and a social worker regarding her missing friends.

In a flashback, she, her boyfriend Ryan, her best friend Chari and her childhood friend Archie go on a camping trip and met up with their friends Lia and twins Kiko and Pong. The twins destroy some anthills at the campsite despite Lia's warning not to, recalling stories of elementals. They are enraged when their homes are destroyed and seek revenge.

That night, Kiko wakes up to relieve himself. He is attacked by an unknown creature. The next morning, the friends split up to try and find him. Archie, Lia and Pong hear Kiko's voice in a cave, prompting Archie and Lia to get some climbing gear while Pong stays at the cave. Chari is separated from Ryan and Sheila and is chased by a figure. She gets lost and attempts to run, but is killed. Ryan and Shiela find her mutilated body. Ryan and Shiela meet up with Archie and Lia. Ryan wants everyone to get away, but Archie refuses to leave the twins behind. Shiela goes with Archie, while Lia goes with Ryan.

On their way back to the campsite, Ryan and Lia are killed by the creature. Archie, Sheila and Pong climb down the cave. They find Kiko but are unable to free him before he dies. The creature attacks the group and kills Pong as Archie and Shiela climb back up. The creature catches up outside, and Shiela escapes but Archie is killed attempting to fight it off. Shiela makes it back to the campsite and attempts to escape using one of the cars. Due to her panic she is unable to start it up, causing her to be captured by the creature. It is revealed that there are two of them.

In the present, the policeman and social worker find it hard to believe her story. As the policeman starts to tell her she'll be facing murder charges, Shiela screams in pain. She collapses and dies with her stomach bulging. The policeman notices something moving in Shiela's stomach, from which a creature bursts out of.

== Cast ==
=== Diablo ===
- Maja Salvador as Claire
- Mark Anthony Fernandez as Fr. Ronnie
- Gina Alajar as Tita Beth
- Joem Bascon as Fr. Paul
- Alex Castro as Jake
- Irma Adlawan as Dr. Yulo
- Janice de Belen as Nurse (cameo appearance)
- Paolo Bediones as Newscaster
- Sabrina Man as Young Claire
- Frances Makil-Ignacio as Claire's mother
- Neil Ryan Sese as Claire's father
- Jairus Aquino as Kuya Dave
- Eugene Domingo, Pen Medina, and Andoy Ranay as Diablo (voice; uncredited)

=== Ukay-Ukay ===
- Ruffa Gutierrez as Kayla
- Zoren Legaspi as Harold
- John Lapus as Basti
- Megan Young as Lucia
- Miguel Faustman as Joaquin Castillano
- Carl Guevarra as Young Joaquin
- Philip Lazaro as Renz

=== Lamanglupa ===
- Jennica Garcia as Sheila
- Rayver Cruz as Archie
- Martin Escudero as Ryan
- Iya Villania as Lia
- Dominic Roco as Pong
- Felix Roco as Kiko
- Bangs Garcia as Chari
- Archie Adamos as Policeman
- Julia Clarete as Social Worker

== Accolades ==
Award-giving body	Award	Work	Results
35th Metro Manila Film Festival	Best Picture	Shake, Rattle & Roll XI	Nominated
35th Metro Manila Film Festival	Best Make-up	Shake, Rattle & Roll XI	Won
35th Metro Manila Film Festival	Best Film Director(s)	Rico Gutierrez, Don Michael Perez, Jessel Monteverde	Nominated
35th Metro Manila Film Festival	Best Supporting Actor	John Lapus	Nominated
35th Metro Manila Film Festival	Best Original Story	Gina Marie Tagasa, Elmer Gatchalian, Renato Custodio	Nominated
35th Metro Manila Film Festival	Best Cinematography	Juan Lorenzo	Nominated
Metro Manila Film Festival Award for Best Actor	Best Actor	Ruffa Gutierrez	Nominated

== See also ==
- List of ghost films
