= Makiusap Ka sa Diyos =

1991 Filipino film directed by Lino Brocka

- Theatrical poster
- Directed by: Lino Brocka
- Written by: Raquel Villavicencio
- Produced by: Lily Monteverde
- Starring: Ruffa Gutierrez; Christopher de Leon; Gabby Concepcion
- Cinematography: Clodualdo Austria
- Edited by: George Jarlego Jr.
- Music by: Lutgardo Labad
- Production company: Regal Films
- Distributed by: Regal Films
- Release date: July 24, 1991
- Running time: 113 minutes
- Country: Philippines
- Language: Filipino

Makiusap Ka sa Diyos (lit. 'Plea to God') is a 1991 Filipino drama film directed by Lino Brocka, in his final film directorial effort before he was killed in a car crash, from a story and screenplay written by Raquel Villavicencio. The film stars Ruffa Gutierrez, Christopher de Leon and Gabby Concepcion.

Produced and distributed by Regal Films, the film was theatrically released on July 24, 1991, and was praised by critics and award-giving organizations but failed at the box office run.

== Plot ==
Dolores Aaron (Gutierrez), who came from a prominent family, is a young novice and is about to take her perpetual vows. She becomes pregnant, gives birth, and is punished by her cruel superiors. She then meets Vince (de Leon) and marries him but later discovers that Vince was the one who raped her.

== Cast ==
- Ruffa Gutierrez as Dolores Aaron-Leveriza
- Christopher de Leon as Dr. Vince Leveriza
- Gabby Concepcion as Allan
- Gloria Romero as Encarnacion Aguirre vda. de Leveriza
- Rosemarie Gil as Mrs. Aaron
- Maricel Laxa as Belinda
- Cris Villanueva as Emil
- Mary Walter as Sister Bernadette
- Anita Linda as Sister Carmen
- Gamaliel Viray as Lawyer
- Rudy Tacorda as Judge
- Malu de Guzman as Sister Amanda
- Aida Carmona as Kumadrona
- Ernie Zarate as Fr. Emman
- Benjie Ledesma as Sister Daisy
- Vangie Labalan as Baliw
- Estrella Kuenzler as Sister Asuncion
- Chie Concepcion as Ursula
- Jayboy Samson as Benjie
- Mad Nicolas as Sister
- Yvonne Angeli Lee as Cecile
- Thea Salvador as Sister
- Michael Tan as Lester
- Pocholo Montes as Priest Confessor
- Nonong Talbo as Ward Orderly

== Reception ==
=== Accolades ===
Award-giving organization	Date of ceremony	Category	Recipient(s)	Result	Ref.
40th FAMAS Awards	April 7, 1992	Best Child Actress	Margarita Fuentes	Nominated	
15th Gawad Urian Awards	April 1992	Best Supporting Actor	Gabby Concepcion	Won	
Star Awards	1992	Best Director	Lino Brocka	Nominated	
Star Awards	1992	Best Actress	Ruffa Gutierrez	Nominated	
Star Awards	1992	Best Screenplay	Raquel Villavicencio	Nominated	
Star Awards	1992	Best Editor	George Jarlego	Nominated	
Star Awards	1992	Best Production Design	Benjie de Guzman	Nominated	
Star Awards	1992	Best Musical Score	Lutgardo Labad	Nominated	

== See also ==
- Sa Kabila ng Lahat, Brocka's penultimate film, also released in 1991
