= Gabby Concepcion =

Filipino actor (born 1963)

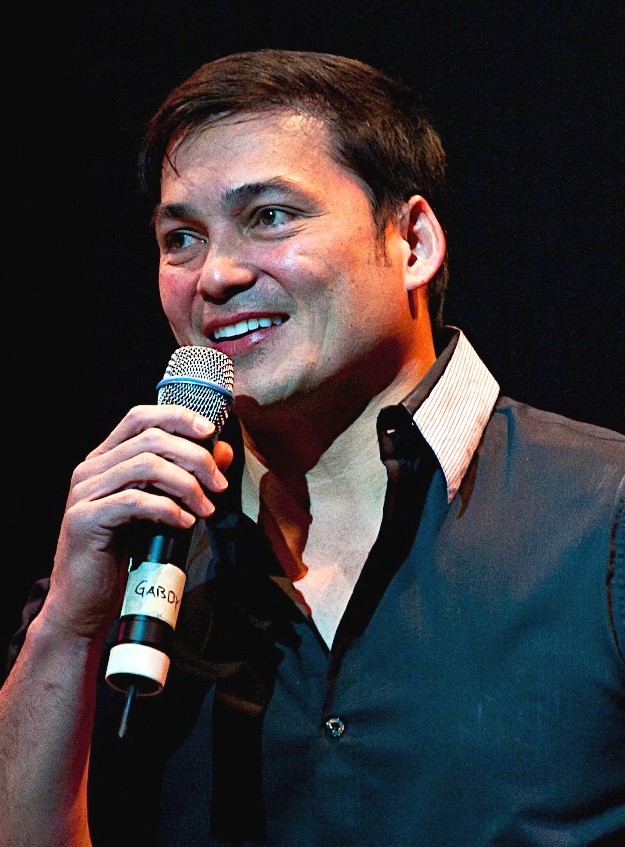
- Concepcion in 2010
- Born: Gabriel Arellano Concepcion; November 5, 1964 (age 61); San Juan, Rizal, Philippines
- Occupations: Actor, singer and businessman
- Years active: 1980–1995; 2008–present
- Agent(s): ABS-CBN (1993–1995, 2008–2015); GMA Artist Center (since 2015); Regal Entertainment (since 1980); Viva Artists Agency (since 1984)
- Spouses: Sharon Cuneta (m. 1984; ann. 1993) Jenny Syquia (m. 1993; ann. 1996) Genevieve Gonzales (m. 2004)
- Partner: Grace Ibuna (1989)
- Children: 5, including KC
- Website: http://www.gabbyconcepcionlive.com

Gabriel Arellano Concepcion (Tagalog: [ˈgabɪ kɔnsɛpˈʃon]; born 5 November 1964) is a Filipino actor, singer and businessman. He began his show business career in the 1980s as a teen commercial model and is known for his debonair career in Philippine cinema.

He is currently an exclusive actor of GMA Network and exclusive talent of Sparkle GMA Artist Center and exclusive talent of GMA Pictures. His accolades includes 1x Urian Best Actor Award, 2x GAWAD Parangal Best TV Actor Award, 2x FAMAS Best Supporting Actor Award, a Seoul International Drama Award, 3x PMPC Stars for Television Best Actor Award, 5x PMPC Stars for Movies Best Actor Award, including nominations for Best Actor and Best Supporting Actor in Metro Manila Film Festivals.

Concepcion made a comeback to film and TV in 2008. His successful comeback roles are in hit series Iisa Pa Lamang, Dahil May Isang Ikaw, Kung Tayo'y Magkakalayo and Kahit Puso'y Masugatan. He transferred over to TV5 to do shows as well like P. S. I Love You and Cassandra: Warrior Angel in 2013, he starred in Bukas na Lang Kita Mamahalin. In 2015, he transferred to GMA Network to star in hit shows such as Because of You and his two-year drama Ika-6 na Utos, also he did Love You Two, First Yaya, First Lady, Stolen Life, and My Guardian Alien.

== Family ==
Gabriel Arellano Concepcion was born in San Juan, Metro Manila, Philippines. His parents were Rolando Concepcion (of Filipino—Spaniard descent) and Maria Lourdes Arellano. He was named after the Archangel Gabriel and was baptized at the Convent of Santuario del Santo Cristo. He later attended both Miriam College and Lincoln University in California, USA. He was a Dean's List at Lincoln University.

On 23 September 1984, Concepcion married actress Sharon Cuneta at the Manila Cathedral of the Immaculate Conception in a grand televised wedding ceremony attended by former President Ferdinand Marcos and Imelda Marcos, whom both served as their nuptial sponsors. The Catholic wedding was officiated by the former Archbishop of Manila, Cardinal Jaime Lachica Sin and Monsignor Augusto Pedrosa.

Concepcion is the great—grandson of the Filipino painter and architect Juan Arellano.

== Career ==
Concepcion first appeared as a model in a 1980 Close-Up toothpaste TV commercial. He later starred in the Regal Films production Katorse (English: Fourteen). From 1980 to 1995, he made 80 films and had several modeling and endorsement advertisements.

On 13 November 1988, Concepcion left for the United States despite not yet finishing his scenes for the film Pahiram ng Isang Umaga (English: "Let Me Borrow the Twilight"), directed by Ishmael Bernal, causing the film's intended release date of December 25 (for the 1988 Metro Manila Film Festival) to be moved next year.

In 1995, he migrated to the United States for a real estate career in Stockton, California. In 2008, he returned part-time to Philippine show business.

== Politics ==
In 1986, Concepcion campaigned alongside his former wife Sharon Cuneta for the re-election bid of former Philippine president Ferdinand Marcos in the 1986 Philippine presidential election.

In 1988, he ran for mayor of San Juan, but was not successful.

== Personal life ==
Concepcion was married to:

- Sharon Cuneta — (1984–1987)
  - Daughter: Singer and actress, Maria Kristina Cassandra "KC" Concepcion.
- Jenny Syquia — (1993–1996)
  - Daughter: Former beauty queen, Maria Helena Skarne—Hill.
- Genevieve Yatco Gonzales — (2004–present)
  - Daughters: Samantha Alexis and Savannah Concepcion.

Concepcion partnered with:

- Grace Ibuna (1989)
  - Daughter: Creative musician, Maria Gabrielle Concepcion.

== Filmography ==
=== Film ===
Year	Title	Role	Note(s)
1980	Katorse	Gabby	
1980	Under-Age	Gary	
1981	Bihagin: Bilibid Boys	Butch	
1981	Totoo Ba ang Tsismis?	Gabriel	
1981	Burgis	Juni Locsin	
1981	Dear Heart	Jimmy	
1981	Hello, Young Lovers	Tony Lara	
1981	P.S. I Love You	Mark	
1982	My Only Love	Billy	
1982	Miracle of Love	Gabriel	
1982	Boystown	Bobet	
1983	I'll Wait for You (Even If It takes Forever)	Gabby Cruz	
1983	Pepe en Pilar	Pepe	
1983	Don't Cry for Me, Papa	Nonoy	
1983	Always in My Heart	Gary	
1983	Story of 3 Loves	Benjie	
1984	Dapat Ka Bang Mahalin?	Lito	
1984	The Best of Sharon & Gabby (docufilm)	Himself	
1984	Sa Hirap at Ginhawa	Arnold Zaragoza	
1984	Anak ni Waray vs. Anak ni Biday	Eddie	
1985	Pati Ba Pintig ng Puso?	Aldrin	
1985	Mga Kwento ni Lola Basyang	Principe Amante	segment "Sleeping Beauty"
1986	Yesterday, Today & Tomorrow	Neil	
1987	Pinulot Ka Lang sa Lupa	Efraim	
1987	Asawa Ko, Huwag Mong Agawin	Mike Ledesma	
1987	Bakit Iisa ang Pag-ibig	Louie	
1988	Rosa Mistica	Dio	segment "Mga Dilaw Na Rosas ni Rosario"
1988	Bukas Sisikat Din ang Araw	Gerry	
1988	Nagbabagang Luha	Alex Montaire	
1988	Sa Puso Ko Hahalik ang Mundo	Benjie Tuazon	
1989	Gorio en Tekla	Danny	
1989	Pahiram ng Isang Umaga	Manuel Domingo	
1989	Kokak	Leo	
1989	Jessa: Blusang Itim Part II	Manolo	
1989	Rosenda	Robbie	
1989	Huwag Kang Hahalik sa Diablo	Crisanto	
1990	Bakit Ikaw Pa Rin?	Paul	
1990	Hahamakin Lahat	Renato	
1990	Kaaway ng Batas	Rafael Aleta	
1991	Pakasalan Mo Ako	Dodie	
1991	Pangako ng Puso	Alfred	
1991	Kislap sa Dilim	Dick	
1991	The Adventures of Gary Leon at Kuting	Gary	
1991	Sgt. Gabo: Walang Patawad Kung Pumatay	Sgt. Gabo	
1991	Kailan Ka Magiging Akin	Ramir Macalincag	
1991	Makiusap Ka sa Diyos	Allan	
1991	Una Kang Naging Akin	Nick/Darwin	
1992	Tayong Dalawa	Tonchi	
1992	Sinungaling Mong Puso	Roman Ong-Chiong	
1992	True Confessions (Evelyn, Myrna & Margie)	Warren	
1992	Bakit Ako Mahihiya?	Joey	
1992	The Good, the Bad & the Ugly	Gabriel	
1992	Ayoko Na Sanang Magmahal	Nick	
1992	Kailangan Kita	Gerry	
1992	Narito ang Puso Ko	Dr. Louie Chavez	
1993	Kapag May Gusot Walang Lusot	Sam Allan	
1993	Kung Ako'y Iiwan mo	Felix Martin	
1993	Mancao	Joey De Leon	
1994	Minsan Lang Kitang Iibigin	Dave	
1994	Loretta	Richard Eloriaga	
1994	Iukit Mo sa Bala	Rico Velez	
1994	Ang Ika-Labing Isang Utos: Mahalin Mo, Asawa Mo	Roy	
1996	Kristo	Juan Bautista	
2009	I Love You, Goodbye	Dr. Adrian Benitez	
2010	I'll Be There	Pocholo "Poch" dela Cerna	
2010	White House	Jet	
2011	Yesterday, Today, Tomorrow	Gary	
2012	The Mommy Returns	William	
2013	A Moment in Time	Steve Linden	
2013	When the Love Is Gone	Emmanuel "Emman" Luis	
2014	Diary ng Panget	Cross' Dad/Mr. Sandford	
2015	Crazy Beautiful You	Mayor Ito Alcantara	
2015	Felix Manalo	Eraño Manalo	
2017	Across the Crescent Moon	Johnny Garcia	
2019	Man and Wife	Carding	

=== Television ===
Year	Title	Role	Notes
1993–2001	Star Drama Presents	Gerardo	Episode guest
2008	Maalaala Mo Kaya: Taxi	Bert	Episode guest
2008	ASAP	Himself	
2008	Iisa Pa Lamang	Rafael Torralba	Main role / Protagonist
2008	The Buzz	Himself	Guest
2009	May Bukas Pa	Ricardo	
2009	Elive Entertainment	Himself	Guest
2009–2010	Dahil May Isang Ikaw	Jaime Alferos	Lead role
2010	Kung Tayo'y Magkakalayo	Steve S. Sebastian	Lead role
2011	Maalaala Mo Kaya: Bulaklak	Manuel	Episode Guest
2011	Regal Shocker: Elevator	Tony Salvacion	
2011–2012	P.S. I Love You	Mark Roxas	Main role
2012	Bandila	Himself / Guest	Segment: Ikaw Na!
2012–2013	Kahit Puso'y Masugatan	Miguel De Guzman	Main role / protagonist
2013	Cassandra: Warrior Angel	Azrael	Main role / antagonist
2013	Cassandra: Warrior Angel	Uriel / Ariel	Main Role / Protagonist
2013	Bukas na Lang Kita Mamahalin	Martin Dizon	Special participation
2013	Banana Nite	Himself	
2014	Mars Ravelo's Dyesebel	Dante Montilla	Supporting cast
2015	Walang Tulugan with the Master Showman	Himself	Guest
2015	Sunday PinaSaya!	Himself	Guest
2015–2016	Because of You	Jaime Salcedo	Main role / protagonist
2016	Idol sa Kusina	Himself	Guest co-host
2016	Poor Señorita	Jaime Salcedo	Guest cast (a crossover character from Because of You)
2016	Pepito Manaloto	Reggie	Episode guest
2016	Dear Uge	Dante Mercado	Episode guest
2016	Bubble Gang	Himself	Episode guest
2016	Magpakailanman: Finding Earl: The Dollente Family Story	Ernest	Episode guest
2016–2017	Tsuperhero	Sergeant Cruz	Supporting role / protagonist
2016–2018	Ika-6 na Utos	Capt. Jerome "Rome" Fuentebella / Jordan "Chef J" Francisco	Main role / protagonist
2017	Karelasyon	Romeo	Episode guest
2017	Sarap Diva	Himself	Guest
2017	Wowowin	Himself	Guest
2017	Magpakailanman: May Forever	Ariel Cruz	Episode guest
2018	Celebrity Bluff	Himself	Master Bluffer
2018	Magpakailanman: Ibalik Mo Sa Akin Ang Anak Ko	Raul	Episode guest
2019	Love You Two	Joaquin 'Jake' Reyes Jr.	Lead cast / protagonist
2020	Dear Uge: My Dream Girl	Roy	Episode guest
2021	First Yaya	Vice President Glenn Francisco W. Acosta	Main cast / protagonist
2022	First Lady	President Glenn Francisco W. Acosta	Main cast / protagonist
2023; 2024	All-Out Sundays	Himself	Guest performer
2023–2024	Stolen Life	Darius Rigor	Main cast / protagonist
2024	My Guardian Alien	Carlos Soriano/Jesus	Leading role with Marian Rivera
2025	My Father's Wife	Robert Rodriguez	Main Cast / Protagonist / Antagonist

== Awards and nominations ==
Awards and Nomination
Year	Award-giving body	Category	Nominated work	Results
1990	14th Gawad Urian Awards	Best Actor	Pahiram ng Isang Umaga	Nominated
1991	15th Gawad Urian Awards	Best Actor	Hahamakin ang Lahat	Nominated
1992	16th Gawad Urian Awards	Best Supporting Actor	Makiusap Ka sa Diyos	Won
1993	17th Gawad Urian Awards	Best Actor	Narito ang Puso Ko	Won
1992	40th FAMAS Awards	Best Actor	Una Kang Naging Akin	Nominated
1992	40th FAMAS Awards	Best Supporting Actor	Kislap sa Dilim	Nominated
1993	41st FAMAS Awards	Best Supporting Actor	Sinungaling Mong Puso	Won
1992	3rd Young Critics Circle Awards	Best Performance	Narito ang Puso Ko	Nominated
1992	3rd Young Critics Circle Awards	Best Performance	Tayong Dalawa	Nominated
2008	22nd PMPC Star Awards for TV	Best Single Performance by an Actor	Maalaala Mo Kaya: "Taxi"	Nominated
2009	35th Metro Manila Film Festival	Best Actor	I Love You, Goodbye	Nominated
2010	58th FAMAS Awards	Best Actor	I Love You, Goodbye	Nominated
2016	6th OFW Gawad Parangal	Best Actor	Because of You	Won
2016	64th FAMAS Awards	Best Supporting Actor	Crazy Beautiful You	Won
2017	12th Seoul International Awards	Asian Star Prize	Ika-6 na Utos	Won

== Discography ==
=== Albums ===
Date	Title	Label	Songs
2008	Gabby Concepcion	Warner Music Philippines	"Iisa Pa Lamang", "Nakapagtataka", "When I Met You", "Sana Ay Ikaw Na Nga", "Come What May", "Ako Pa Ba?", "Just Once", "Give Me a Chance", "Kung Kailangan Mo Ako", "Hanggang", "Please Forgive Me", "Manila-Awitin Mo Isasayaw Ko"
January 28, 2010	Unforgettable	Warner Music Philippines	"Moon River", "Can't Take My Eyes Off You", "Put Your Head on My Shoulder", "I Have Told You Lately That I Love You", "Smile", "Unforgettable", "Reminiscing", "You've Got a Friend", "Sunday Morning", "Cool Change", "How Did You Know?", "Sway", "Save the Last Dance for Me", "Fly Me to the Moon", "It's Over Now"
