= Dayo: Sa Mundo ng Elementalia =

- MMFF release poster
- Directed by: Robert Quilao
- Written by: Artemio Abad; Eric Cabahug
- Produced by: Jessie Lasaten
- Starring: Nash Aguas; Katrina Legaspi; Michael V Pokwang; Nova Villa; Noel Trinidad; Johnny Delgado; Peque Gallaga; Laurice Guillen; Gabe Mercado; John Manalo; Igi Boy Flores; Carl John Barrameda; Pocholo Gonzales
- Edited by: Robert Quilao
- Music by: Jessie Lasaten
- Production company: Cutting Edge Productions
- Release date: December 25, 2008
- Running time: 90 minutes
- Country: Philippines
- Language: Filipino
- Budget: ₱56 million
- Box office: ₱5.6 million

Dayo: Sa Mundo ng Elementalia (transl. Visitor: In the World of Elementalia or The Wanderer in the Land of Elementalia) also called Niko: The Journey to Magika in English-speaking countries, is a 2008 Philippine animated fantasy adventure film written by Artemio Abad Jr. and Eric Cabahug and directed by Robert Quilao. and Produced by Cutting Edge Productions, the film revolves around Bubuy who has to save his grandparents who were abducted and brought to the strange land called Elementalia, home to a host of strange creatures from Philippine mythology.

Dayo is the Philippines' first all-digital full-length animated feature film, was released on December 25, 2008, as an official entry to 34th Metro Manila Film Festival.

== Overview ==
Dayo: Sa Mundo ng Elementalia is a heartwarming story of overcoming one's fear and succeeding over adversity. The plot revolves around Bubuy (voiced by Nash Aguas) who is out to save his abducted grandparents in the land of Elementalia, a magical and mystical world that houses many of the mythical creatures of the Philippines and other enchanted elements. This locally produced animated film aims to reintroduce the other side of mythical creatures like the tikbalang, kapre, manananggal, and aswang by giving a new dimension to these typically reviled creatures.

== Plot ==
After being cheated and defeated by his classmate bullies in a race, Bubuy (Nash Aguas) is forced to treat them with snacks but he is unable—making them upset, they instead challenge him to go the woods at dawn, in which he reluctantly agrees.

Bubuy arrives home sad at the outcome of the race and refuses telling his grandparents, Lolo Miong (Noel Trinidad) and Lola Nita (Nova Villa) what troubles him. When it's dinner, he excuses himself "to work with a project" at a classmate's house and that he will return soon, bidding them goodbye.

He arrives in the woods and meets up with the bullies. They command him to light a fire in the heart of the forest enough for them to see at a distance and give him a flashlight. Though scared of the night, he enters the forest and makes a fire out of matches and dry boughs. Accidentally, the fire spreads and burns the old Balete tree. With its destruction, the vines pursue Bubuy to his home and it results to the abduction of his grandparents.

Panicked, he asks help from their neighbors who go to his house, but seeing that everything appears to be fine contrary to what Bubuy has told, they get angry for believing that they are pranked. He was only comforted by two kind neighbors before they left him alone, advising him to rest.

While he was praying in his room, a manananggal named Anna (Katrina "Hopia" Legaspi) appears outside his home and offers to help him find his lost grandparents through a friend she knows. She opens a portal in the mound of their backyard that leads them to "Elementalia", the world of mythical and enchanted creatures. Both enter the portal and Anna consults Lolo Nano (Peque Gallaga), a nuno. Lolo Nano tells him to fetch a mirror and a picture of his grandparents back home. The nuno tells Bubuy and Anna that his grandparents are still alive, only enslaved by a powerful being he needs to defeat before full moon, which is the day after, otherwise, he will be trapped in their dimension forever. He himself must accomplish three tasks: get a sacred water from the Siyokoys, capture enchanted fireflies, and pluck four fruits from the Kapre's tree. Lolo Nano gives him the things he needed. To ensure his safety, he is given a magical slingshot that will kill any evil creature and Anna willfully accompanies him to his journey. Along their way, they meet Narsi (Michael V.), a Tikbalang who serves Bubuy (after plucking a few strands of his mane) and help them throughout their journey.

Bubuy accomplishes the tasks and battles the monstrous Balete tree and its minions with his friends and additional forces of Anna's father's army. They defeated the being and evil creatures and Bubuy finally returns to the human world with his grandparents.

Days after the incidents, Bubuy is seen winning the race and saving a student from being a victim of his former bullies using his slingshot given to him by Lolo Nano. Before the end, he replants the burnt tree with a new one as a sign of peace and respect. He later joins Anna in a flight around Manila, watching Fireworks at the Mall of Asia and enjoys the flight around EDSA while chasing with Anna's aunts and uncles.

== Voice casts ==
Character	Original	English
Bubuy/Niko, the "Wanderboy"	Nash Aguas	Mitchiko Azarcon-Tiongson
Anna, the "Manananggirl"	Katrina Legaspi	Gaby Paschua
Carlo/	John Manalo	
Narsi, the "Chickbalang"	Michael V.	Miguel Vasquez
Mang Nano/Old Man Milo	Peque Gallaga†	Jeremy Domingo
Toti and Hal-Lan	Pocholo Gonzales	Jeremy Domingo
Lolo Miong/Grandpa Romeo	Noel Trinidad	Henry Strzalkowski
Lola/Grandma Nita	Nova Villa	May Zayco
Tita/Auntie Vicky	Pokwang	May Zayco
Carpio	Johnny Delgado†	Apollo Abraham
Jo/Joe	Gabe Mercado	Raymond Narag
Bruha, Diwata/Enchantress and Kapress	Laurice Guillen	
Arvi/	Carl John Barrameda	
Mark Boi/	Igi Boy Flores	
Tiyanaks/Shapeshifters	James "Moymoy" Obeso; Rodfill "Roadfill" Obeso	

== Production ==
According to executive producer and composer Jessie Lasaten, Dayo required the work of over five hundred artists and took two years to complete, compared to the usual three-year completion of a traditional full-length animation.

The production team of Dayo spent several months developing the story, mood, and the whole package of the animation. While writing the script, the writers consulted a book on local mythology by Maximo Ramos entitled Creatures of Philippine Lower Mythology.

Dayo's budget was revealed to be $1.3 million (roughly ₱58 million), composed of over 500 local animators features a “tra-digital animation” technique using paperless 2D and 3D technologies. It has 2D animation for its characters and 3D animation for the backdrops.

=== Music ===
The film's soundtrack used full orchestration from Gerard Salonga and FILharmoniKA. In addition, Lea Salonga performed the movie's theme's song "Lipad".

- Lipad - Lea Salonga
- Lipad (Rock version) - Roots of Nature
- Kapit - Moymoy Palaboy
- Daybreak - Juan Lunar
- Kasalo at Kasuyo - Noel Cabangon
- Pang-surprise - Jay Durias

== Release ==
The film's entry into the Metro Manila Film Festival proved to be problematic when the screening committee rejected the script written by Temi Abad Jr. and Eric Cabahug. The committee challenged Cutting Edge Productions to prove that Dayo was financially viable.

== Reception ==
=== Critical ===
Dayo was given a grade of "A" by the Cinema Evaluation Board, which allowed the producers a 100% amusement tax rebate. It was also endorsed by the Philippines' Department of Education (DepEd) and the National Council for Children's Television. The film was praised for presenting elements derived from folklore, myths, pop culture in the Philippine perspective. Its soundtrack and voice acting marked other strong points. On the technical side, however, flaws on animation rendering and shading were noted. Most notably, Dayo received praise for its cel-animated portrayal of Manila as well as its catchy presentation of Filipino culture.

=== Box office results ===
- ₱1,200,000 (December 25, 2008)
- ₱2,200,000 (December 26, 2008)
- ₱3,200,000 (December 28, 2008)
- ₱3,700,000 (December 29, 2008)
- ₱4,100,000 (December 31, 2008)
- ₱5,600,000 (January 7, 2009)

=== Accolades ===
At the awards ceremony of the 2008 Metro Manila Film Festival, Dayo won four awards for sound, visual effects, musical score and song.

==== 2008 Metro Manila Film Festival ====
- Best Sound: Albert Idioma and Whannie Dellosa
- Best Visual Effects: Robert Quilao
- Best Musical Score: Jessie Lasaten
- Best Theme Song: "Lipad" by Jessie Lasaten and Artemio Abad Jr., performed by Lea Salonga

== See also ==
- Urduja, another Filipino animated film from the same year
- 2008 Metro Manila Film Festival
