= 2009 Metro Manila Film Festival =

Film festival edition

2009 Metro Manila Film Festival 35th Metro Manila Film Festival
- Awards: Gabi ng Parangal (lit. 'Awards Night')
- No. of films: 7
- Festival date: December 25, 2009 to January 7, 2010

MMFF chronology
- 36th ed. 34th ed.

The 35th Metro Manila Film Festival–Philippines was held from December 25, 2009, to January 7, 2010. During this period, no other films are allowed to be screened in Philippine theaters.

Ang Panday received the Best Picture Award in the 2009 Metro Manila Film Festival. According to reports on the festival’s awards, a film's grosses represent about 40% of its merits, so it should be no surprise that Ang Panday is chosen the best film. With revenues estimated at more than ₱20 million (approx. US$430,000), Bong Revilla's vehicle has led the Metro Manila festival's box office in its first three days. The film also earned seven other awards including the Best Actor for Revilla, Metro Manila Film Festival Award for Best Supporting Actor and Child Performer for second consecutive time winners Phillip Salvador and Buboy Villar respectively, and Best Original Theme Song for Ogie Alcasid among others.

Meanwhile, Regal Films' Mano Po 6: A Mother's Love won six awards including the Best Actress for Sharon Cuneta, Best Supporting Actress for Heart Evangelista, Best Director for Joel Lamangan and the prestigious Gatpuno Antonio J. Villegas Cultural Awards above others.

== Entries ==
These are the 7 films in the film festival.

Title	Starring	Studio	Director	Genre
Ang Darling Kong Aswang	Vic Sotto, Cristine Reyes, Agot Isidro, Rafael Rosell, Jean Garcia	OctoArts Films, APT Entertainment and M-Zet TV Productions	Tony Y. Reyes	Comedy, Horror
I Love You, Goodbye	Angelica Panganiban, Gabby Concepcion, Kim Chiu, Derek Ramsay	Star Cinema	Laurice Guillen	Drama
Nobody, Nobody But... Juan	Dolphy, Gloria Romero, Eddie Garcia, Pokwang, Eugene Domingo, Heart Evangelista, Eric Quizon, Vandolph, Epi Quizon	RVQ Productions	Enrico S. Quizon	Comedy
Mano Po 6: A Mother's Love	Sharon Cuneta, Kris Aquino, Zsa Zsa Padilla, Christopher De Leon, Heart Evangelista, Dennis Trillo, Ciara Sotto, Glaiza de Castro	Regal Entertainment	Joel Lamangan	Drama
Ang Panday	Bong Revilla, Iza Calzado, Rhian Ramos, Buboy Villar, Phillip Salvador, Geoff Eigenmann	GMA Films and Imus Productions	Mac Alejandre	Action, Adventure, Comedy, Fantasy
Shake, Rattle & Roll XI	Ruffa Gutierrez, Zoren Legaspi, Megan Young, Jennica Garcia, Mart Escudero, Maja Salvador, Iya Villania, Bangs Garcia	Regal Entertainment	Michael Perez, Jessel Monterverde, Rico Gutierrez	Horror
Wapakman	Manny Pacquiao, Krista Ranillo, Rufa Mae Quinto, Benjie Paras, Bianca King, Polo Ravales	Solar Entertainment Corporation	Topel Lee	Action, Comedy, Sci-Fi, Superhero

== Awards ==
2009 Metro Manila Film Festival Gabi ng Parangal
- Date: December 28, 2009
- Site: SMX Convention Center, Pasay

Highlights
- Best Picture: Ang Panday
- Most awards: Mano Po 6: A Mother's Love and Ang Panday (7)

Television coverage
- Network: Solar TV

The awarding ceremony was held on December 28, 2009, at the SMX Convention Center, SM Mall of Asia, Pasay. The jury is composed of National Artist for Film Eddie Romero, Cinema Evaluation Board chair Christine Dayrit, Movie and Television Review and Classification Board chair Consoliza Laguardia, festival executive director Rolly Josef, film director Bebong Osorio, Film Editors Guild president Jess Navarro, film producer Simon Ongpin, composer Dero Pedero, Metropolitan Manila Development Authority AGM Planning head Cora Cruz, Manila Bulletin entertainment editor Crispina Belen and Marikina center of excellence head Julie Borje.

The criteria for judging Best Pictures are as follows:

- Box office earning on the first three days (December 25–27): 50%
- Artistry, creativity and technical excellence, innovativeness and global appeal: 40%
- Filipino, cultural and/or historical value: 10%

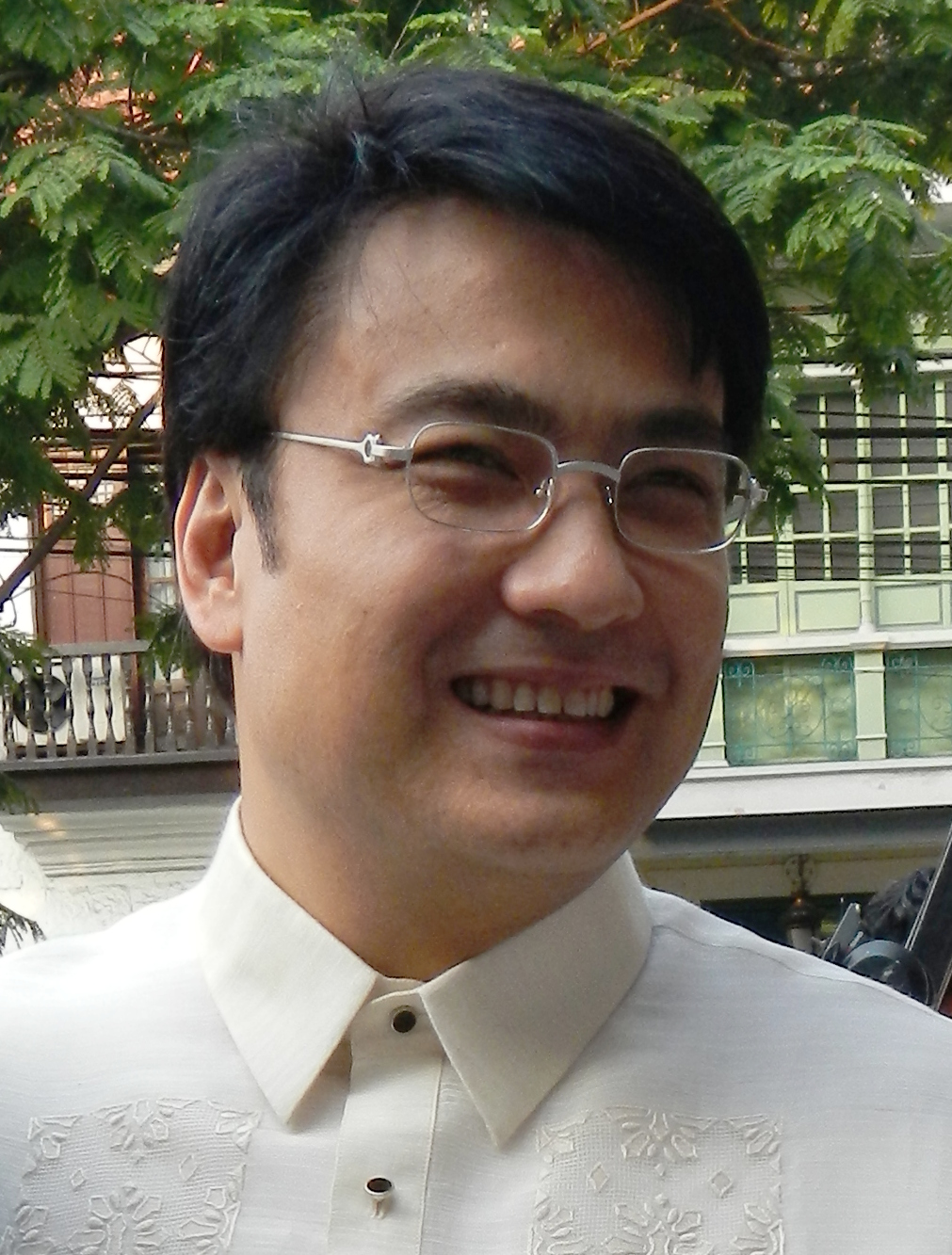
Bong Revilla, Best Actor winner

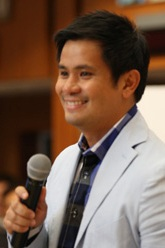
Ogie Alcasid, Best Original Theme Song winner

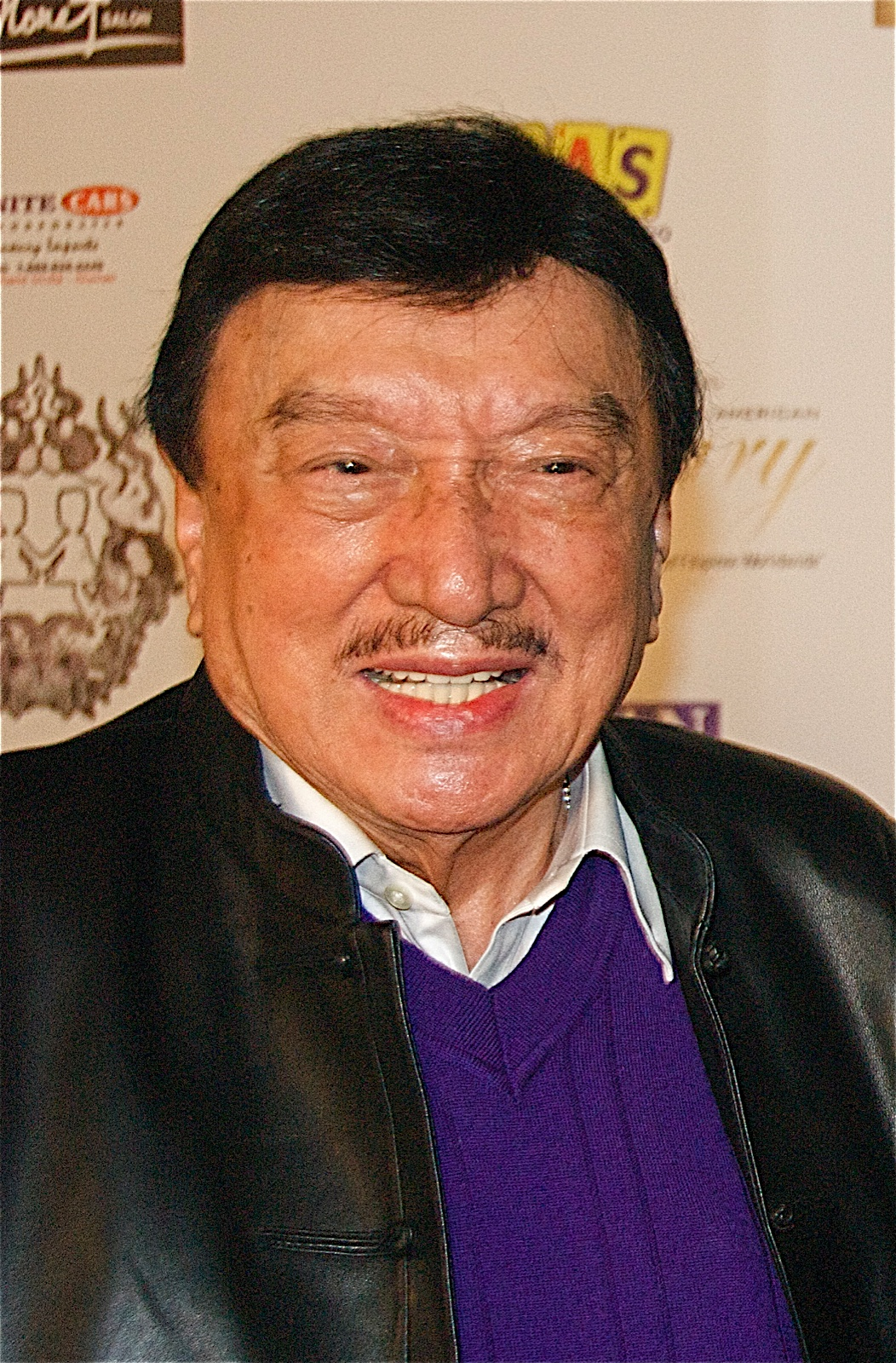
Dolphy, Lifetime Achievement Award recipient

Best Picture	Best Director
**Ang Panday - GMA Films and Imus Productions**; I Love You, Goodbye - Star Cinema (2nd Best Picture); Ang Darling Kong Aswang - OctoArts Films, M-Zet Productions and APT Entertainment (3rd Best Picture); Shake, Rattle & Roll 11 - Regal Entertainment	**Joel Lamangan - Mano Po 6: A Mother's Love**; Rico Gutierrez, Don Michael Perez, Jessel Monteverde - Shake, Rattle & Roll 11
Best Actor	Best Actress
**Bong Revilla - Ang Panday**; Dolphy - Nobody, Nobody But... Juan; Vic Sotto - Ang Darling Kong Aswang; Gabby Concepcion - I Love You, Goodbye; Derek Ramsay - I Love You, Goodbye; Manny Pacquiao - Wapakman	**Sharon Cuneta - Mano Po 6: A Mother's Love**; Angelica Panganiban - I Love You, Goodbye; Cristine Reyes - Ang Darling Kong Aswang; Iza Calzado - Ang Panday
Best Supporting Actor	Best Supporting Actress
**Phillip Salvador - Ang Panday**; Eddie Garcia - Nobody, Nobody But... Juan; Jojo Alejar - Wapakman; John Lapus - Shake, Rattle & Roll 11; Dennis Trillo - Mano Po 6: A Mother's Love; Eric Quizon - Nobody, Nobody But... Juan; Jeffrey Quizon - Nobody, Nobody But... Juan	**Heart Evangelista - Mano Po 6: A Mother's Love**; Zsa Zsa Padilla - Mano Po 6: A Mother's Love; Heart Evangelista -Nobody, Nobody But... Juan; Kim Chiu - I Love You, Goodbye; Rhian Ramos - Ang Panday; Agot Isidro - Ang Darling Kong Aswang
Best Cinematography	Best Production Design
**Lee Briones-Meily - I Love You, Goodbye**; Juan Lorenzo - Shake, Rattle & Roll 11	**Richard Somes - Ang Panday**
Best Child Performer	Best Editing
**Robert Villar - Ang Panday**	**Manet Dayrit and Efren Jarlego - I Love You, Goodbye**
Best Original Story	Best Screenplay
**Vanessa Valdez, Anna Karenina Ramos and Kriz Gazmen - I Love You, Goodbye**; Gina Marie Tagasa, Elmer Gatchalian, Renato Custodio - Shake, Rattle & Roll 11	**Roy Iglesias - Mano Po 6: A Mother's Love**
Best Original Theme Song	Best Musical Score
**Ogie Alcasid ("Tanging Ikaw Lamang" - performed by Regine Velasquez) - Ang Panday**	**Von de Guzman - Mano Po 6: A Mother's Love**
Best Visual Effects	Best Make-up Artist
**Jay Santiago - Ang Panday**	**Noel Flores - Shake, Rattle & Roll 11**
Best Sound Recording	Best Float
**Mike Idioma - Ang Darling Kong Aswang**	-
Most Gender-Sensitive Film	Gatpuno Antonio J. Villegas Cultural Awards
**Mano Po 6: A Mother's Love - Regal Entertainment**	**Mano Po 6: A Mother's Love - Regal Entertainment**

=== Special categories ===
Winners are listed first and highlighted in boldface.

Lifetime Achievement Award	Posthumous Award for Film Service and Excellence
**Dolphy**	**Esperidion Laxa**

== Multiple awards ==
Awards	Film
7	Ang Panday
7	Mano Po 6: A Mother's Love
4	I Love You, Goodbye
2	Ang Darling Kong Aswang

== Box Office gross ==
Entry	Gross Ticket Sales					
Entry	December 25	December 27	December 31	January 2	January 3	January 7
Ang Panday	₱ 16,900,000*	₱ 36,900,000*	₱ 58,000,000*	₱ 80,800,000*	₱ 90,200,000*	₱ 99,400,000*
I Love You, Goodbye	₱ 11,700,000	₱ 29,600,000	₱ 51,000,000	₱ 69,800,000	₱ 77,600,000	₱ 94,300,000
Ang Darling Kong Aswang	₱ 16,800,000	₱ 35,300,000	₱ 56,500,000	₱ 76,000,000	₱ 83,000,000	₱ 89,600,000
Shake, Rattle & Roll 11	₱ 16,200,000	₱ 36,000,000	₱ 53,000,000	₱ 66,200,000	₱ 71,100,000	₱ 77,600,000
Mano Po 6: A Mother's Love	₱ 6,900,000	₱ 17,000,000	₱ 25,000,000	₱ 33,800,000	₱ 37,000,000	₱ 42,000,000
Nobody, Nobody But... Juan	₱ 8,000,000	₱ 18,200,000	₱ 23,000,000	₱ 28,000,000	₱ 29,700,000	₱ 31,900,000
Wapakman	₱ 750,000	₱ 1,400,000	₱ 2,100,000	₱ 2,500,000	₱ 2,600,000	₱ 2,600,000
					TOTAL	₱ 437,600,000

== Cinema Evaluation Board ==
- Mano Po 6: A Mother's Love: Graded A
- I Love You, Goodbye: Graded B
- Ang Darling Kong Aswang: Graded B
- Ang Panday: Graded B

Preceded by 2008 Metro Manila Film Festival	Metro Manila Film Festival; 2009	Succeeded by 2010 Metro Manila Film Festival
