= Jenny Syquia =

Filipina actress (born 1967)

- Born: Jenny Robinson Syquia; November 2, 1967 (age 58); Binghamton, New York, U.S.
- Occupations: Actress and model
- Spouses: Gabby Concepcion (m. 1993; ann. 1996) Filip Skarne (m. 1997)
- Children: 2
- Website: Official site

Jenny Robinson Syquia-Skarne (born November 2, 1967) is a Filipina-American Swedish model, actress and fashion designer.

== Personal life ==
Syquia was born into the historically prominent Syquia family of the Philippines. Among the family’s notable properties are the Syquia Mansion in Vigan, a 19th-century bahay na bato recognized as a historical landmark, and the Syquia Apartments (also known as Syquia Towers) in Manila, which were among the tallest residential buildings in the Philippines when completed in the 1950s and among the first to feature elevators and private car parking.

In June 1993, after a whirlwind courtship, Syquia married multi-award-winning actor Gabby Concepcion in Las Vegas. She became the stepmother to KC Concepcion (Gabby’s daughter with his ex-wife, Philippine actress Sharon Cuneta). On August 17, 1994 Syquia gave birth to her first daughter, [Cloie Syquia Skarne (better known by her stage name, Cloie Concepcion) (who would go on to become a TV host and performer in the Philippines in addition to winning the Miss Earth Sweden title in 2016). The marriage between Concepcion and Syquia was annulled in 1996.

In 1997, Syquia married Filip Skarne. He legally adopted the two-year-old Cloie. She has a second daughter, Filippa Babes with Skarne.

== Career ==
Syquia began her career in fashion in New York, where she worked as a fashion assistant at Vogue, assisting senior editors and gaining early industry experience that later informed her work in fashion, media, and design.

=== Magazine editing ===
In 1994 Syquia founded and became the editor-in-chief of Bride Philippines magazine. Bride Philippines was that country's first magazine for brides.

=== Modeling ===
After graduating from college, Syquia modeled commercially in the Philippines and endorsed such products as Palmolive Optima shampoo and Queenie Cosmetics among others. She also modeled in Boston for Maggie, Inc.

Syquia is the founder of TRIT Jewelry.

=== Acting ===
==== Television ====
Year	Title	Role
1993	Gabby and Jenny Wedding Special	Herself / Guest, interview with Tina Monzon-Palma
1994	Oh No, It's Johnny!	Herself / Guest, interview with Johnny Litton
1994	Martin After Dark	Herself / Guest, interview with Martin Nievera
1994-1995	For Women Only	Herself / Host
1996	Eezy Dancing	Herself / Guest
1996	Startalk	Herself / Guest, interview with Boy Abunda
1996	Showbiz Lingo	Herself / Guest, interview with Christy Fermin
1996	The Sharon Cuneta Show: Birthday Special	Herself / Guest
1996	Tele Sine aka Ganda Ganda	Herself / Guest
1997	Eat Bulaga!	Herself / co-host with Joey de Leon
1997	ASAP	Herself / Guest, song performance
1999	The Buzz	Herself / Guest, interview with Boy Abunda
2012	The Buzz	Herself / Guest, interview with Charlene Gonzales
2012	Cristy Ferminute	Herself / Guest
2012	Startalk	Herself / Guest, interview with Ricky Lo

==== Movies ====
Syquia began her movie career in 1996. She signed an eight-picture contract with the Philippines' largest and most-successful entertainment management group, Viva Entertainment.

Year	Title	Role
1997	Eseng ng Tondo	Dita
1997	Takot Ako sa Darling Ko	Bampi
1997	Hanggang Dito na Lang	Alicia
1997	Bridesmaids	Alexandra

== Fashion designer ==
Along with half-sister Christine, Jenny Syquia founded the handbag and accessories line Charm & Luck in 2004. They received an influx of $9 million in funding from Capstone Trade in 2006. Celebrities such as Lindsay Lohan, Jessica Simpson and Paris Hilton were customers. In 2007, this company was nominated for Best Accessories company at the Dallas Fashion Awards.

By 2008, their "kitschy, fun styles" were carried in more than 1,700 stores in 25 countries, including Dillards, Nordstrom, Bloomingdale’s and Lord & Taylor. Charm and Luck was regularly featured on the Home Shopping Network.

After the birth of her second daughter, Syquia decided to become a full-time mother.

She re-signed with Viva Entertainment in 2012.

In December 2025, Syquia appeared on the digital cover of Tatler Philippines and was featured in an in-depth cover story in the print edition, which highlighted her international career and life in Stockholm.
