= I Love You, Goodbye (film) =

- Theatrical movie poster
- Directed by: Laurice Guillen
- Screenplay by: Vanessa R. Valdez; Kris G. Gazmen; Anna Karenina L. Ramos; Jerome Co
- Story by: Anna Karenina L. Ramos; Laurice Guillen; Mark Meily
- Produced by: Charo Santos-Concio; Malou N. Santos
- Starring: Gabby Concepcion; Angelica Panganiban; Kim Chiu; Derek Ramsay
- Cinematography: Lee Briones-Meily
- Edited by: Manet Dayrit; Efren Jarlego
- Music by: Von de Guzman
- Production company: ABS-CBN Film Productions, Inc.
- Distributed by: Star Cinema
- Release date: December 25, 2009
- Country: Philippines
- Language: Filipino
- Budget: ₱25 million
- Box office: ₱94.3 million (Official 2009 MMFF run) ₱120 million (Official Domestic run)

I Love You, Goodbye is a 2009 Filipino romance drama film starring Gabby Concepcion, Angelica Panganiban, Derek Ramsay and Kim Chiu. It is produced and released by Star Cinema. It is also the official entry of Star Cinema to the 35th Metro Manila Film Festival.

The film was also shown in select cities in the United States in January 2010 via ABS-CBN International.

== Plot ==
Lizelle Jimenez is in a relationship with surgeon Adrian Benitez. Everything appears to be going well until Adrian's daughter from a previous marriage, Ysa, arrives from abroad and lives with them. Ysa shows her dislike for Lizelle, unbeknownst to Adrian.

Adrian is sued for malpractice and the investigation starts to cause conflict in Adrian and Lizelle's relationship. Feeling unwanted, Lizelle finds comfort in the seductive photographer and ex-boyfriend Gary Angeles, who is now dating Ysa. Lizelle and Gary rekindle their romance, with the latter admitting that he dated Ysa to get back with Lizelle. Ysa tries to win Gary's heart but Gary admits that he loves someone else.

Lizelle and Gary decide to elope, but Lizelle is stood up. Lizelle returns to Adrian and asks to marry him. During the wedding preparations, a lawyer informs Lizelle that Gary has died and named her his sole beneficiary of Gary. Adrian goes home to see Lizelle crying, admitting she tried to leave him for Gary, but he didn't show up. Adrian tells her that he knows Gary because he tried to treat him before he died.

Adrian recounts his story, admitting to Lizelle that he knew she was meeting Gary and planned to leave him. He then confronted Gary. While arguing, Gary tried to cross the road but was struck by a car and died shortly after.

After Lizelle asks for forgiveness, they resolve their problems and proceed with the marriage. Lizelle is shown laying flowers at Gary's tomb before walking away hand in hand with Adrian.

== Cast and characters ==
=== Main cast ===
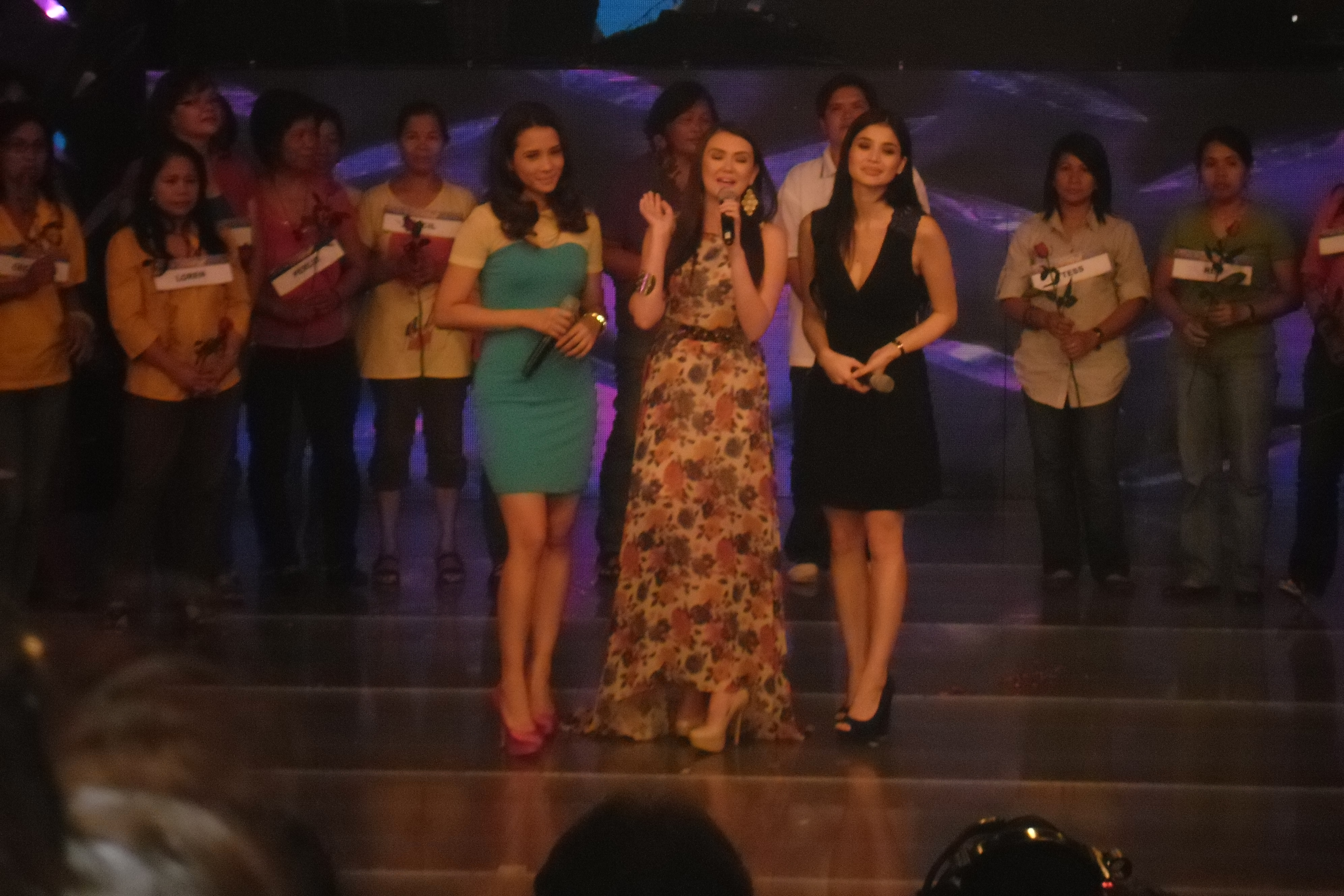
Angelica Panganiban portrays, Lizelle Jimenez

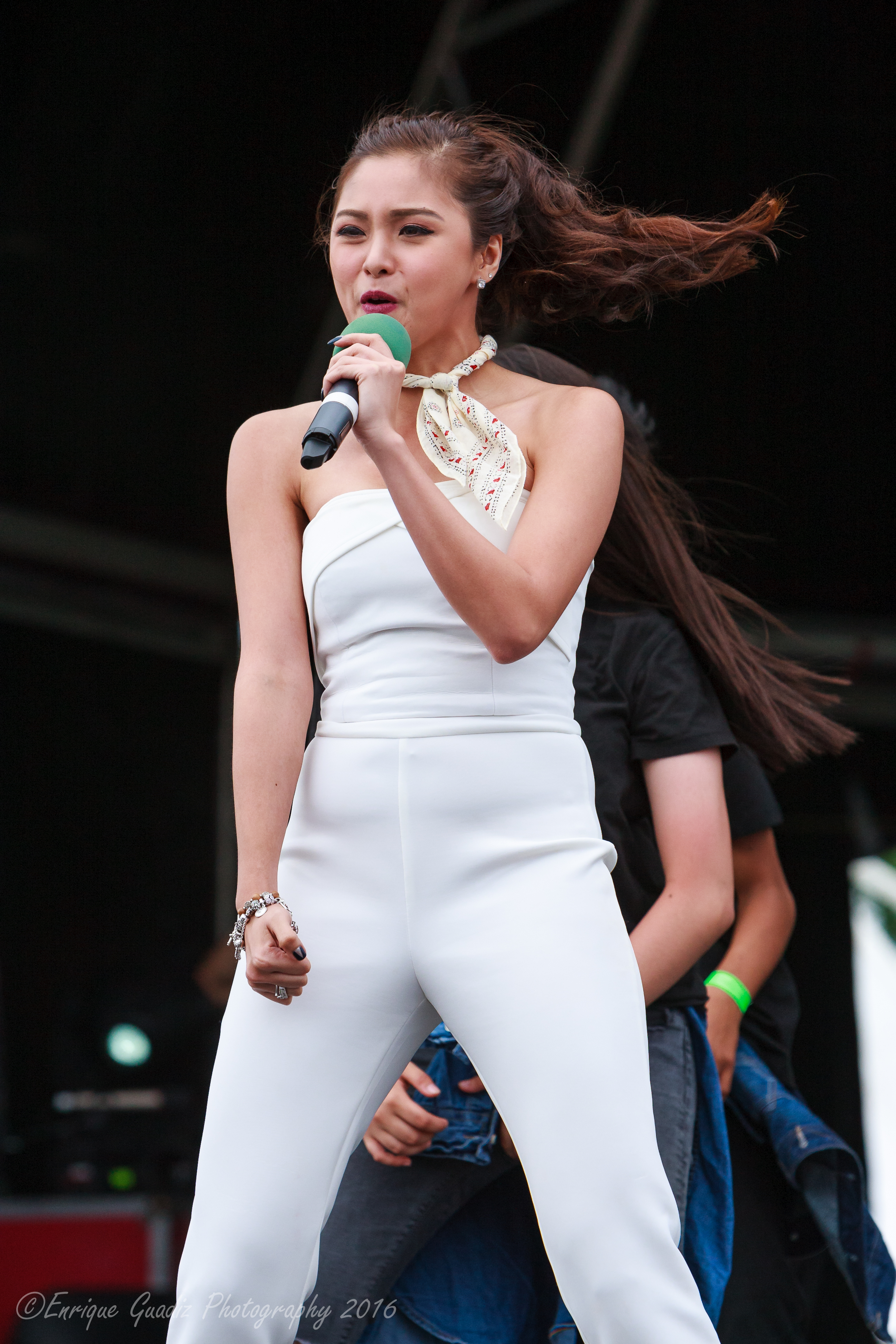
Kim Chiu portrays, Ysa Benitez

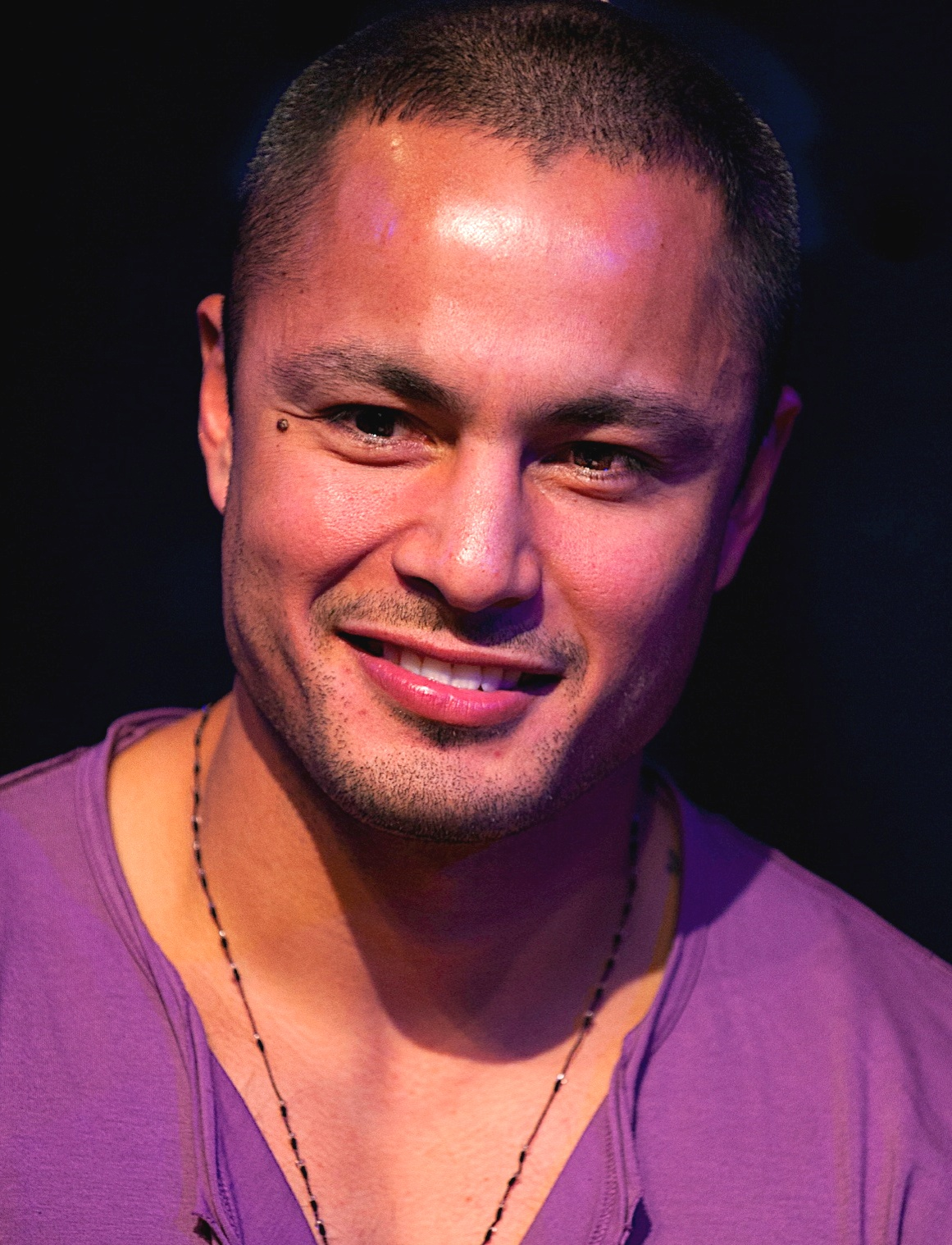
Derek Ramsay, portrays, Gary Angeles

- Gabby Concepcion as Adrian Benitez
- Angelica Panganiban as Lizelle Jimenez
- Derek Ramsay as Gary Angeles
- Kim Chiu as Ysa Benitez

=== Supporting cast ===
- Angel Aquino as Valerie Benitez
- Joem Bascon as Raul
- Matet de Leon as Melai
- Ketchup Eusebio as Jimbo
- Janna Dominguez as Connie
- Liza Lorena as Melinda
- Arlene Muhlach as Claire
- Ces Quesada as Manang
- Cris Villanueva as Arthur
- Chinggoy Alonzo† as Dr. Eduardo Vicencio

== Reception ==
=== Gross ===
I Love You Goodbye grossed a total of ₱94.2 million as of January 7, 2010, where the film fest officially closed. It took the second spot in terms of box-office performance. The film came right after Ang Panday, which grossed ₱99.4 million. And as of January 15, 2010, the film had grossed ₱108 million, according to the statement released by Star Cinema. It became one of the most successful romantic-drama movies from Star Cinema.

=== Feedbacks ===
The movie received positive feedback. Angelica Panganiban's acting was excellent as expected by many. Kim Chiu's performance was subtle as the villain. Her character brought about the movie's conflict. Both actresses received positive reviews on their performance.

== Awards and nominations ==
Award giving body	Award	Recipient	Result
35th Metro Manila Film Festival	2nd Best Festival Picture	I Love You, Goodbye	Won
35th Metro Manila Film Festival	Best Original Story	Vanessa Valdez, Kris Gazmen, Karen Ramos	Won
35th Metro Manila Film Festival	Best Cinematography	Lee Briones Meily	Won
35th Metro Manila Film Festival	Best Film Editor	Manet Dayrit, Efren Jarlego	Won
35th Metro Manila Film Festival	Best Actress	Angelica Panganiban	Nominated
35th Metro Manila Film Festival	Best Actor	Gabby Concepcion	Nominated
35th Metro Manila Film Festival	Best Actor	Derek Ramsay	Nominated
35th Metro Manila Film Festival	Best Supporting Actress	Kim Chiu	Nominated
12th Gawad PASADO Awards	Pinakapasadong Katuwang na Aktor	Derek Ramsay	Won
26th PMPC Star Awards for Movies	Movie of the Year	I Love You, Goodbye	Nominated
26th PMPC Star Awards for Movies	Best Director	Laurice Guillen	Nominated
26th PMPC Star Awards for Movies	Best Actress	Angelica Panganiban	Nominated
26th PMPC Star Awards for Movies	Best Screenplay	Laurice Guillen, Mark Meily, and Karen Ramos	Nominated
26th PMPC Star Awards for Movies	Best Cinematography	Lee Meily	Nominated
26th PMPC Star Awards for Movies	Best Editing	Manet Dayrit	Nominated
26th PMPC Star Awards for Movies	Best Production Design	Edgar Martin Littaua	Nominated
26th PMPC Star Awards for Movies	Best Original Score	Von De Guzman	Nominated
26th PMPC Star Awards for Movies	Best Sound	Albert Michael Idioma	Nominated
