= Buboy Villar =

Filipino actor and singer

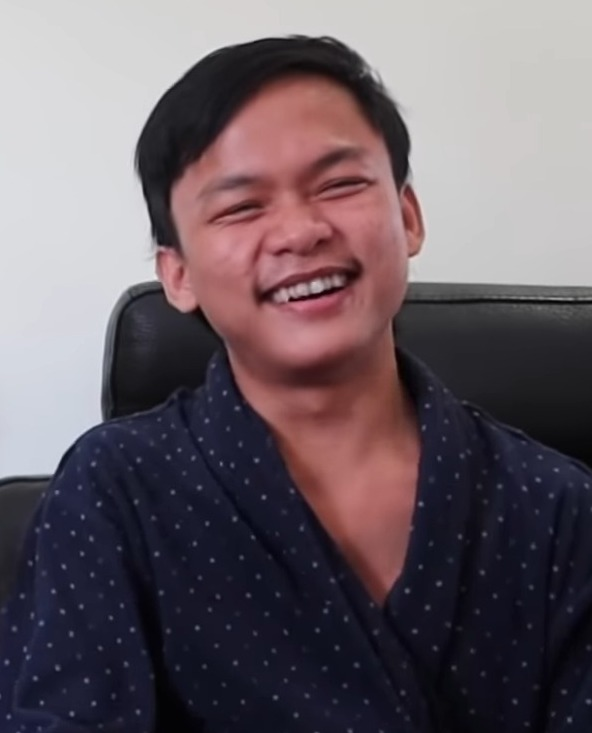
- Villar in 2021
- Born: Robert Tamayo Villar, Jr. March 21, 1998 (age 28); Cebu City, Philippines
- Occupations: Actor; comedian; host; singer
- Years active: 2006–present
- Agent: Sparkle GMA Artist Center
- Partner: Angillyn Serrano Gorens (2016–2018)
- Children: 3

Robert "Buboy" Tamayo Villar Jr. (born March 21, 1998) is a Filipino actor, comedian, host and singer. In 2024, he was formerly one of the main presenters of a Philippine noontime show, Tahanang Pinakamasaya!. Villar is signed under GMA Network's talent agency Sparkle.

== Early life ==
Robert Tamayo Villar Jr. was born on March 21, 1998, in Cebu City but raised in Metro Manila. He is the son of Robert Villar Sr. As of April 2016, Villar is in a relationship with Angillyn Serrano Gorens, an American. Villar stated in July 2017 that he and Gorens, with both their parents' approval, had been living together. Villar began dating Gorens in 2015, but it was not until February 2016 that their relationship became official. On September 1, 2017, Gorens gave birth to the couple's child, Vlanz Karollyn. In August 2019, the couple welcomed their son, George Michael. Villar has also revealed his intention to marry Gorens in the United States in that same year. But as of October 2020 they are separated but not divorced.

In 2025, Villar revealed that he had a third son with his girlfriend, Khrizza Mae Sampiano.

== Career ==
His first television appearance was when he auditioned in ABS-CBN's Little Big Star. He is also a member of the youngest boy band in the Philippines, the Mak and the Dudes. Villar's breakthrough performance was in Dyesebel in 2008. He has appeared in high-profile films such as Supahpapalicious, Shake, Rattle & Roll X, Ang Panday, and Philippine dramas such as Zaido: Pulis Pangkalawakan, Darna, and Panday Kids. Villar became one of the new hosts of the reformatted Eat Bulaga! after a huge resignation of the original cast due to an alleged internal conflict with TAPE Inc until the production company renamed the show Tahanang Pinakamasaya! on January 6, 2024.

== Filmography ==
=== Film ===
Year	Title	Role	Note(s)
2008	Supahpapalicious	Young Hercules	
2008	Iskul Bukol 20 Years After: The Ungasis and Escaleras Adventure	Oohn	
2008	Shake, Rattle & Roll X	Junie	
2009	Ang Panday	Bugoy	
2009	Kamoteng Kahoy	Atong	
2010	Super Inday and the Golden Bibe	Digo	
2011	Ang Panday 2	Bugoy	
2013	Rekorder		
2013	Morgue		Credited as "Robert Villar"
2013	Boy Golden		
2014	Children's Show		
2015	Kid Kulafu	Emmanuel Pacquiao	
2015	Old Skool		
2015	Isang Hakbang		
2015	Angela Markado	Jun	
2016	Everything About Her	Boy	
2018	Otlum	Fred	
2020	Suarez: The Healing Priest		
2022	Huling Lamay		
2022	Kuta		
2024	DitO	Joshua	
2025	Samahan ng mga Makasalanan	Boy Nakaw/Padala	
2026	Utoy Story		

=== Television ===
Year	Title	Role	Note(s)
2006	Little Big Star	Himself (contestant)	
2006	Goin' Bulilit	Himself	
2006	Calla Lily	Berto	
2007	Super Twins	Ding	
2007	Da Adventures of Pedro Penduko	Nognog	
2007	Impostora	Raul	
2007	Zaido: Pulis Pangkalawakan	Oggy Lorenzo / Zaido Kid Green	
2008	Komiks Presents: Kapitan Boom	Young Lance Mercado	
2008	Dysebel	Buboy	
2008	Obra	Butch	
2008	LaLola	Boogie	
2009	Zorro	Pepe	
2009–2010	Darna	Carding	
2010	Panday Kids	Oliver	
2010	Jejemom	G-Boy dela Cruz / Sander Jones	
2010	Grazilda	Guest	
2011	Jillian: Namamasko Po		
2011	Machete	Val Ledesma	
2011	Magic Palayok	Isko	
2011	Amaya	Banuk	
2012	Luna Blanca	Samuel "Samboy" De Jesus	
2012	Paroa: Ang Kuwento ni Mariposa	Uno	
2013–2016	Walang Tulugan with the Master Showman	Himself (co-host and performer)	
2013	Home Sweet Home	Basty	
2013	Magpakailanman		Episode: "The Kesz Valdez Story"
2013	Kahit Nasaan Ka Man	young Benjo	
2014	Adarna	Jerry	
2015–2016	The Half Sisters	Marlon	247 episodes
2015	Magpakailanman		Episode: "Ang Huling Laro ng Aking Anak"
2016	Maynila	Krizzy	Episode: "Love Prevails"
2016	Dolce Amore	Franco	
2016	Encantadia	Wantuk	
2016	Magpakailanman	Himself	Episode: "Fight for Love"
2018	Inday Will Always Love You	Paeng	
2019	TODA One I Love	Bogart	
2019	Eat Bulaga!	Kidney Spears (winner)	
2019	One of the Baes	Okoy	
2020	Makulay ang Buhay	Himself (guest)	
2021	Owe My Love	Gwaps" Guipit	
2021	Magpakailanman	Betong Sumaya	Episode: "The Amazing Story of Betong Sumaya"
2021–2023	All-Out Sundays	Himself (performer)	
2021–2023	The Boobay and Tekla Show	Himself (guest host)	
2022	False Positive	Malakas	
2022–2024	Running Man Philippines	Himself (celebrity contestant)	
2023	Magpakailanman	Himself	Episode: "Luha sa Likod ng Tawa"
2023–present	Bubble Gang	Himself (various roles)	
2023–2024	Eat Bulaga!	Himself (host)	
2024	Tahanang Pinakamasaya	Himself (host)	
2024	Black Rider	Odeng	
2024	It's Showtime	Himself (guest)	
2024	Pinoy Pawnstars	Himself (guest)	
2025	Encantadia Chronicles: Sang'gre	Wantuk	
2025	Sanggang-Dikit FR	Kaloy	Guest role
2026	Taskforce Firewall	Jhay-Jhay Gonzaga	

== Discography ==
Album	Year of release	Track listing
Oldies but Kiddies by Mak and the Dudes	2007	"Breaking Up Is Hard to Do"; "Oh! Carol"; "Stand by Me"; "Runaway"; "Diana"; "Ang Cute ng Ina Mo"; "Araw Natin 'Toh!"

== Awards and nominations ==
Year	Award	Category	Work	Result
2008	34th Metro Manila Film Festival	Best Child Performer	Shake, Rattle & Roll X	Won
2009	25th Star Awards for Movies	Best Child Performer	Shake, Rattle & Roll X	Nominated
2009	35th Metro Manila Film Festival	Best Child Performer	Ang Panday	Won
2009	40th GMMSF Box-Office Entertainment Awards	Most Popular Child Actor, Movies & TV		Won
2010	26th Star Awards for Movies	Best Child Performer	Ang Panday	Nominated
