= Ang Darling Kong Aswang =

- Directed by: Tony Y. Reyes
- Written by: Marvic Sotto; Bibeth Orteza; Tony Y. Reyes
- Produced by: Orly R. Ilacad; Antonio P. Tuviera; Marvic Sotto
- Starring: Vic Sotto; Cristine Reyes
- Cinematography: Lito 'Itok' Mempin
- Edited by: Fiona Borres; Chrisel Desuasido
- Music by: Jessie Lasaten
- Production companies: OctoArts Films; APT Entertainment; M-Zet Productions
- Release date: December 25, 2009
- Country: Philippines
- Language: Filipino
- Box office: ₱89.6 million (Official 2009 MMFF run) ₱99 million (Official Domestic run)

Ang Darling Kong Aswang (lit. "My Aswang Darling"), is a 2009 Filipino comedy horror film starring Vic Sotto and Cristine Reyes.

== Plot ==
A group of aswang led by Batang (Jean Garcia) begins to wreak havoc in a sleepy village in the middle of the night. One of its members, Elisa (Cristine Reyes) and her mother Ida (Agot Isidro) were caught by Barang along with her three daughters Beta (Denise Laurel), Alpha (Jackie Rice), and Keka (Empress Schuck) eating animal flesh, but they managed to escape. Victor (Vic Sotto) working in a company is a widower single father to his two daughters Aileen (Barbie Forteza) and Angel (Mika Dela Cruz). He also lives with his father Do (Dante Rivero), who is a village captain, and cousin Tom (Ritchie D'Horsie). Upon learning of what Elisa and Ida did, Barang warned them that something will happen if they learn that they are no longer eating human flesh. What's worse is that Joaquin (Rafael Rosell) wants to marry Elisa for her safety. Because of this, she and Ida decided to stay with their relative Banong (Nonong de Andres). When Victor's car overheated, Jerry (Wally Bayola) and Tom decided to fetch water from an abandoned house, only to be scared by Banong. When Elisa and Ida arrived, Victor was mesmerized by her beauty. Ida didn't rejected Elisa's feelings. She knows that only true love would break the curse. Afterwards, Victor decided to court Elisa. However, Aileen and Angel didn't approve of Victor marrying again. As Victor and Elisa started to date, Elisa admits that she's an aswang. Reluctant at first, Victor accepted Elisa despite her situation.

When Do talked to Aileen and Angel and told about Victor's relationship with Elisa, both of them decided to approve of their relationship. When Do suggested to have a Church wedding, Ida decided that it's best for them to have a simple civil wedding in a full moon. It was on a full moon, that Elisa would transform into an aswang. Another factor is that she never put salt in her dishes that she cooks. This until Barang knew about the whereabouts of Elisa and Ida. While Victor and Elisa had their honeymoon, Alpha, Beta and Keka went to Banong's house and attacked him and Ida. As Aileen and Angel are walking home and passed by Banong's house, they saw three ferocious dogs, believed to be the three sisters. They ran scared and the three sisters went to Victor's house. Elisa told him to throw salt all over the house leaving the three sisters. They also sought help from Nana Simang. As they went to Banong's house, Victor, Elisa and Do saw Banong's lifeless but not Ida. Alpha, Beta and Keka would once again attack Victor's house. As Victor and Elisa fought them, Alpha and Keka would be killed by a Stingray tail, which is used to kill aswangs. Until Do admits the family secret. His ancestors were aswangs before. But his father decided to turn his back in being an aswang with the help of Father Anton. Elisa went to Barang to know about what happened to Ida, but the entire sect had her as their sacrifice. Victor, Tom and Jerry went to Barang's lair to save Elisa with the help of Mang Pek's instruments to combat aswangs. They fought them and killed Gino and Joaquin. As they escaped, Barang would do anything to kill Elisa. As they were about to go to the Church with Aileen, Angel, Tom and Jerry, a herd of aswangs attacked them. Victor fought against Barang, while Elisa became severely wounded in her fight with both Beta and Barang that led to their deaths.

As Victor was about to bring Elisa inside the Church, she struggled but managed to get the Cross held by Father Anton and her curse was broken. As they were about to leave, Tom and Jerry became aswangs leaving Victor, Elisa and others screamed in horror.

== Cast ==
- Vic Sotto as Victor Lagman
- Cristine Reyes as Eliza Santos
- Jean Garcia as Barang
- Agot Isidro as Ida
- Dante Rivero as Do
- Denise Laurel as Beta
- Jackie Rice as Alpha
- Empress Schuck as Keka
- Richie D'Horsie as Tom
- Rafael Rosell as Joaquin
- Mika Dela Cruz as Angel Lagman
- Barbie Forteza as Aileen Lagman
- Wally Bayola as Jerry
- Joonee Gamboa as Father Anton
- Luz Fernandez as Simang
- Gian Sotto as Gino
- Sam Y.G. as Mr. Singh
- Jenny Miller as Mrs. Singh
- Allan K. as Pasiyonista
- Shalala as Shalala
- Petite as Pasiyonista 1
- Tita Swarding as Gay in the bible study
- Joey de Leon as Mang Pekweng or Mang Pek (an Albularyo)
- Mosang as Bebang
- Oyo Sotto as Policeman/Dj Midnight
- Jacky Woo as Cameraman
- Pia Guanio as Aip
- Rufa Mi as Applicant
- Nonong de Andres aka Bangkay as Banong

== Awards and nominations ==
Award giving body	Award	Recipient	Result
35th Metro Manila Film Festival	3rd Best Festival Picture	Ang Darling Kong Aswang	Won
35th Metro Manila Film Festival	Best Director	Tony Y. Reyes	Nominated
35th Metro Manila Film Festival	Best Actor	Vic Sotto	Nominated
35th Metro Manila Film Festival	Best Actress	Cristine Reyes	Nominated
35th Metro Manila Film Festival	Best Supporting Actress	Agot Isidro	Nominated
35th Metro Manila Film Festival	Best Screenplay	Bibeth Orteza and Anna Karenina Ramos	Nominated
35th Metro Manila Film Festival	Best Cinematography	Lito Mempin	Nominated
35th Metro Manila Film Festival	Best Sound Recording	Mike Idioma	Won
7th ENPRESS Golden Screen Awards	Best Visual Effects (Imaginary Friends)		Nominated

== See also ==
- List of ghost films
