= Ang Panday (2009 film) =

2009 Filipino action fantasy film

- Theatrical film poster
- Directed by: Rico Gutierrez; Mac Alejandre
- Screenplay by: R.J. Nuevas
- Story by: Carlo J. Caparas; R.J. Nuevas
- Produced by: Jose Mari Abacan; Andrea Bautista Ynares; Rowena Bautista Mendiola
- Starring: Ramon "Bong" Revilla; Phillip Salvador; Iza Calzado
- Cinematography: Regiben Romana
- Edited by: Augusto Salvador
- Music by: Von de Guzman
- Production companies: Imus Productions; GMA Films
- Distributed by: GMA Films
- Release date: December 25, 2009
- Running time: 110 minutes
- Country: Philippines
- Language: Filipino
- Budget: ₱70 million
- Box office: ₱99.4 million (Official 2009 MMFF run) ₱108 million (Official Domestic run)

Ang Panday (lit. 'The Blacksmith') is a 2009 Filipino action fantasy film adapted from Carlo J. Caparas' Panday comics. Directed by Rico Gutierrez and Mac Alejandre, it stars Ramon "Bong" Revilla in the title role, Phillip Salvador and Iza Calzado. It was one of the entries in the 2009 Metro Manila Film Festival.

Revilla previously starred as a version of the title character, Flavio the blacksmith, in the 1993 film Dugo ng Panday. Phillip Salvador, who plays the antagonist Lizardo, portrayed Flavio in a television series adaptation of Ang Panday (2005).

== Plot ==
Long ago, the evil wizard Lizardo (Phillip Salvador) sent an army of monsters to subjugate the land and its people. Lizardo succeeded, but a prophecy tells of a comet that will fall to Earth, and a man who will wield a weapon that will free the people from Lizardo's tyranny. Flavio (Bong Revilla Jr.) is a blacksmith content with living a quiet, uneventful life in a town mostly untouched by Lizardo's evil. But when the comet of prophecy lands on the outskirts of town, Flavio's destiny is immediately made clear. Around the peace-loving but brave Flavio. His arch-enemy Lizardo attempts to ruin the peace and harmony of their dwelling place, affecting the inhabitants. Moreover, the evil warlord challenges Flavio by capturing his beautiful lady love Maria (Iza Calzado). A series of events take place, bringing the blacksmith (panday) at the forefront of a full-blown war against Lizardo's troops.

== Cast ==
- Ramon "Bong" Revilla as Flavio/Panday
- Phillip Salvador as Lizardo
- Iza Calzado as Maria
- Geoff Eigenmann as Celso
- Robert Villar as Bugoy
- Rhian Ramos as Emelita
- Sheena Halili as Dahlia
- Carlene Aguilar as Teresa / Mananaggal
- George Estregan Jr. as Apoykatawan
- Pekto
- Dan Fernandez
- Mat Ranillo III
- Benjie Paras as Zanboro
- John Lapus as Kruma
- Paulo Avelino as Pepe
- Stef Prescott as Ditas
- BJ Forbes as Popoy
- Luz Valdez as Lola Mameng
- Joonee Gamboa as Lolo Isko
- Carlos Morales as Diego
- Gladys Guevarra as Babang
- JB Magsaysay as Benito
- King Gutierrez as Kubada
- Dindo Arroyo as Cruzaldo
- Marissa Sanchez as Miling
- John Feir as Utal
- Carlo Lacana as Young Flavio
- Ace Espinosa as Flavio's father
- Rey Sagum as Hugo
- Banjo Romero as Kumar
- Ambet Nabus as Miling's son
- Anne Curtis as Dyosa Adora

== Production ==
Shooting for the film was done in Ilocos Norte.

== Home media ==
Ang Panday was released onto DVD and VCD by VIVA Video. The DVD release includes the full-length trailer of the film. The DVD/VCD was released on March 11, 2010.

== Sequel ==
The film's sequel was released as an official entry to the 2011 Metro Manila Film Festival. The sequel was directed by Mac Alejandre and featured returning stars, Ramon "Bong" Revilla, Iza Calzado and Phillip Salvador along with a new character played by Marian Rivera.

== Awards ==
=== 35th Metro Manila Film Festival Awards ===
| Year | Category | Recipient | Result |
|---|---|---|---|
| 2009 | Best Picture | Ang Panday | Won |
| 2009 | Best Actor | Bong Revilla | Won |
| 2009 | Best Actress | Iza Calzado | Nominated |
| 2009 | Best Supporting Actor | Phillip Salvador | Won |
| 2009 | Best Supporting Actress | Rhian Ramos | Nominated |
| 2009 | Best Child Performer | Robert Villar | Won |
| 2009 | Best Original Theme Song | Ogie Alcasid ("Dahil Tanging Ikaw" - performed by Regine Velasquez) | Won |
| 2009 | Best Visual Effects | Jay Santiago | Won |
| 2009 | Best Production Design | Richard Somes | Won |

Awards and achievements
| Preceded by Baler | Metro Manila Film Festival Award for Best Picture; 2009 | Succeeded by Ang Tanging Ina Mo (Last na 'To!) |
