= 1992 Metro Manila Film Festival =

Film festival edition

- Date: December 25, 1992 to January 3, 1993
- Site: Manila

Highlights
- Best Picture: Andres Manambit: Angkan ng Matatapang
- Most awards: Andres Manambit: Angkan ng Matatapang (5)

The 18th Metro Manila Film Festival was held in 1992.

Actor Aga Muhlach won his first major award, the Best Actor trophy for the film Bakit Labis Kitang Mahal. The movie also won three other awards including the Best Original Theme Song by the same title of the film for Alex Mallillin. Meanwhile, VIVA Films' Andres Manambit: Angkan ng Matatapang was adjudged the festival's Best Picture and won four other awards including the Best Director for Ike Jarlego, Jr. among others. Other awardees included Best Actress for Gina Alajar, Best Supporting Actress for Sylvia Sanchez and Best Child Performer for I.C. Mendoza. In addition, the year's festival introduced the new category for Best Float, received by the team of the Okay Ka, Fairy Ko!: Part 2 film.

== Entries ==
Title	Starring	Studio	Director	Genre
Andres Manambit: Angkan ng Matatapang	Eddie Garcia, Eddie Gutierrez, Pinky de Leon, Kier Legaspi, Joko Diaz, Mia Pratts, Ramon Christopher	VIVA Films	Ike Jarlego, Jr.	Biography, Action
Bakit Labis Kitang Mahal	Aga Muhlach, Ariel Rivera, Lea Salonga	Octoarts Films	Jose Javier Reyes	Drama, Romance
Engkanto	Janice de Belen, Francis Magalona, Raul Zaragosa, Maila Gumila, Emon Ramos, Apple Pie Bautista, Suisan Lozada, Cita Astals, Roderick Paulate	Double M Films	Tata Esteban	Fantasy
Okay Ka, Fairy Ko!: Part 2	Vic Sotto, Aiza Seguerra, Tweetie de Leon, Tetchie Agbayani, Ruby Rodriguez, Jinky Oda, Bayani Casimiro Jr., Charito Solis	Regal Films and M-Zet Productions	Tony Reyes	Action, Comedy, Fantasy
Shake, Rattle & Roll IV	Episode 1: "Ang Guro" - Manilyn Reynes, Edu Manzano, Sunshine Cruz, Aljon Jimenez and Nida Blanca; Episode 2: "Ang Kapitbahay" - Aiza Seguerra, Janice de Belen, Al Tantay and Lady Lee; Episode 3: "Ang Madre" - Gina Alajar, Aiko Melendez, Miguel Rodriguez, Ai-Ai delas Alas, IC Mendoza, Bella Flores, Lilia Cuntapay	Regal Films	Peque Gallaga and Lore Reyes	Horror
Takbo... Talon... Tili!!!	Rene Requiestas, Rita Avila, Raymond Gutierrez, Richard Gutierrez, Sheryl Cruz, Romnick Sarmenta	Seiko Films	Efren Jarlego	Comedy, Fantasy, Horror

== Winners and nominees ==
=== Awards ===
Winners are listed first and highlighted in boldface.

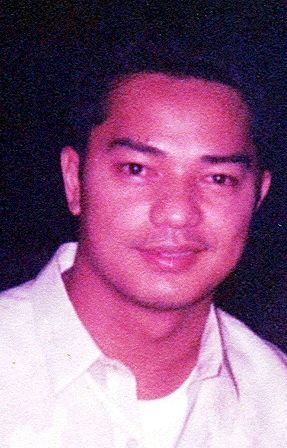
Ariel Rivera, Best Supporting Actor winner

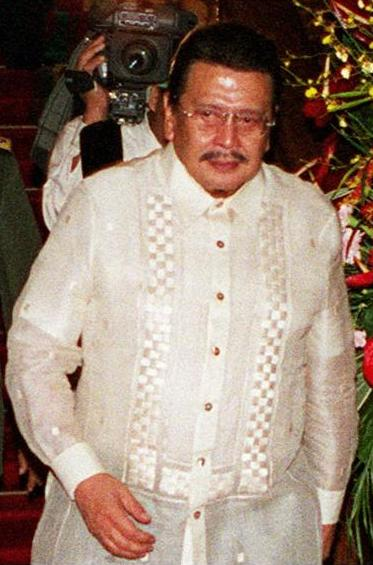
Joseph Estrada, Special Recognition Award recipient

Best Film	Best Director
**Andres Manambit: Angkan ng Matatapang – VIVA Films**; Takbo... Talon... Tili!!! – Seiko Films (2nd Best Picture); Engkanto (3rd Best Picture); Bakit Labis Kitang Mahal – Octoarts Films; Shake, Rattle & Roll IV – Regal Films; Okay Ka, Fairy Ko! Part 2 – Regal Films and M-Zet Productions	**Enrique "Ike" Jarlego Jr. – Andres Manambit: Angkan ng Matatapang**; Peque Gallaga and Lore Reyes – Shake, Rattle & Roll IV; Efren Jarlego – Takbo... Talon... Tili!!!
Best Actor	Best Actress
**Aga Muhlach – Bakit Labis Kitang Mahal**; Eddie Garcia – Andres Manambit: Angkan ng Matatapang; Romnick Sarmenta – Takbo... Talon... Tili!!!	**Gina Alajar – Shake, Rattle & Roll IV**; Sheryl Cruz – Takbo... Talon... Tili!!!; Pinky de Leon – Andres Manambit: Angkan ng Matatapang; Lea Salonga – Bakit Labis Kitang Mahal
Best Supporting Actor	Best Supporting Actress
**Ariel Rivera – Bakit Labis Kitang Mahal**; Eddie Gutierrez – Andres Manambit: Angkan ng Matatapang; Francis Magalona – Engkanto	**Sylvia Sanchez – Takbo... Talon... Tili!!!**; Tetchie Agbayani – Okay Ka, Fairy Ko! Part 2; Sandy Andolong – Bakit Labis Kitang Mahal
Best Production Design	Best Cinematography
**Don Escudero – Shake, Rattle & Roll IV**; Raymond Bajarias – Takbo... Talon... Tili!!!; Arthur Nicdao – Engkanto	**Arnold Alvaro and Ramon Marcelino – Takbo... Talon... Tili!!!**; Sergio Lobo – Okay Ka, Fairy Ko! Part 2; Jun Pereyra – Bakit Labis Kitang Mahal
Best Child Performer	Best Editor
**I.C. Mendoza – Shake, Rattle & Roll IV**; Atong Redillas – Andres Manambit: Angkan ng Matatapang; Aiza Seguerra – Okay Ka, Fairy Ko! Part 2	**Ike Jarlego Jr. – Andres Manambit: Angkan ng Matatapang**; Danny Gloria – Shake, Rattle & Roll IV; Efren Jarlego – Takbo... Talon... Tili!!!
Best Original Story	Best Screenplay
**Humilde ‘Meek’ Roxas – Andres Manambit: Angkan ng Matatapang**; Tata Esteban, Rei Nicandro and Arthur Nicdao – Engkanto; Peque Gallaga, Don Escudero, and Lore Reyes – Shake, Rattle & Roll IV; Ricky Lee and Jose Bartolome – Takbo... Talon... Tili!!!	**Ricky Lee and Jose Bartolome – Takbo... Talon... Tili!!!**; Humilde 'Meek' Roxas – Andres Manambit: Angkan ng Matatapang; Jerry Sineneng – Shake, Rattle & Roll IV
Best Theme Song	Best Musical Score
**"Bakit Labis Kitang Mahal" by Alex Mallillin – Bakit Labis Kitang Mahal**; "'Nay Ko Po" by Archie Castillo – Shake, Rattle & Roll IV; "Engkanto" by Francis Magalona – Engkanto; "Ang Gusto Kong Buhay" by Father and Sons – Andres Manambit: Angkan ng Matatapang	**Dionisio Buencamino – Bakit Labis Kitang Mahal**; Dionisio Buencamino – Takbo... Talon... Tili!!!; Jaime Fabregas – Andres Manambit: Angkan ng Matatapang
Best Visual Special Effects	Best Make-up Artist
**Tony Marbella – Okay Ka, Fairy Ko! Part 2**; Rene Abadeza and Maurice Carvajal – Engkanto; Manong Lacap – Takbo... Talon... Tili!!!	**Andrea Manahan – Shake, Rattle & Roll IV**; Odesa Aeon and Nestor Cariño – Engkanto; Angie Pascua – Takbo... Talon... Tili!!!; Rey Salamat – Okay Ka, Fairy Ko! Part 2
Best Sound Recording	Best Float
**Rolly Ruta – Andres Manambit: Angkan ng Matatapang**; Gaudencio Barredo – Takbo... Talon... Tili!!!; Joe Climaco – Shake, Rattle & Roll IV; Rolly Ruta – Bakit Labis Kitang Mahal	**Okay Ka, Fairy Ko! Part 2 – Regal Films and M-Zet Productions**
Gatpuno Antonio J. Villegas Cultural Awards
**Okay Ka Fairy Ko! Part 2 – Regal Films and M-Zet Productions**

=== Special awards ===
**Special Recognition Award**	Joseph Estrada
**Special Recognition Award**	Joey Lina
**Gawad ng Natatanging Pagkilala**	Nora Aunor
**Male Star of the Night**	Bernard Bonnin
**Female Star of the Night**	Tetchie Agbayani

== Multiple awards and nominations ==
Nominations	Film
14	Takbo... Talon... Tili!!!
12	Andres Manambit: Angkan ng Matatapang
11	Shake, Rattle & Roll IV
9	Bakit Labis Kitang Mahal
8	Okay Ka, Fairy Ko! Part 2
7	Engkanto

Awards	Film
5	Andres Manambit: Angkan ng Matatapang
4	Shake, Rattle & Roll IV
4	Bakit Labis Kitang Mahal
4	Takbo... Talon... Tili!!!
3	Okay Ka, Fairy Ko! Part 2

== Ceremony information ==
The following are the key persons during the "Gabi ng Parangal" held in the PICC Reception Hall on December 28.

- Hosts: Ricky Davao

Gretchen Barretto
Miguel Rodriguez
Maritoni Fernandez

- Anchorperson: Ariel Ureta
- Guest Performers:

Louie Reyes
Eugene Villaluz
Ding Mercado
Bobby Ongkiko Dancers
UP Concert Chorus
Melissa Gibbs
Janet Arnaiz
Donna Cruz
Jennifer Sevilla
Karen Timbol
Joey Palomar
Romnick Sarmenta
Ace Espinosa
Edgar Tejada
Jojo Abella
Nanette Inventor
Mitch Valdez
Rainmakers
Geneva Cruz
Timmy Cruz
Joey Ayala
Imelda Papin
Nora Aunor

== Reception ==
The 18th MMFF logged the highest attendance out of any year of the festival's history at the time, with an attendance of 6.898 million. It also surpassed ₱100 million in total film gross for the first time.

Vice Mayor of Manila Lito Atienza criticized the festival for its "total commercialization" and losing its "reason of being, which is the promotion of good Filipino values through the arts."

Preceded by 1991 Metro Manila Film Festival	Metro Manila Film Festival; 1992	Succeeded by 1993 Metro Manila Film Festival
