= Ariel Rivera discography =

Discography of Filipino singer Ariel Rivera.

== Albums ==
Album information
Ariel Rivera
- Released: 1991 (Philippines)
- Philippine Certification: 3× Platinum
- Sales: 120,000 copies
- Singles:
  - 1991: "Mahal na Mahal Kita"
  - 1991: "Ayoko Na Sana"
Simple Lang
- Released: 1993 (Philippines)
- Philippine Certification: 3× Platinum
- Sales: 120,000 copies
- Singles:
  - 1992: "Simple Lang"
  - 1992: "Without Your Love"
  - 1992: "Minsan Lang Kitang Iibigin
  - 1993: "Wala Kang Katulad"
Paskong Walang Katulad
- Released: 1993 (Philippines)
- Philippine Certification: Gold
- Sales: 20,000 copies
- Singles:
  - 1993: "Sana Ngayong Pasko"
  - 1993: "I Dream of Christmas"
Photograph
- Released: 1995 (Philippines)
- Philippine Certification: Gold
- Sales: 20,000 copies
- Singles:
  - 1995: "Narito Ako"
  - 1995: "Photograph"
Getting to Know
- Released: 1997 (Philippines)
- Philippine Certification: Platinum
- Sales: 40,000 copies
- Singles:
  - 1997: "Lessons Learned"
  - 1997: "Getting to Know Each Other"
Aawitin Ko Na Lang
- Released: 1999 (Philippines)
- Philippine Certification: Gold
- Sales: 20,000 copies
- Singles:
  - 1998: "I Don't Love You Anymore" (duet with Lea Salonga)
  - 1999: "A Smile in Your Heart"
In My Life
- Released: 2003 (Philippines)
- Philippine Certification: 2× Platinum
- Sales: 80,000 copies
- Singles:
  - 2001: "Tell Me"
  - 2001: "You"
  - 2001: "In My Life"

== Singles ==
- "Sana Kahit Minsan" (OST of Sana Kahit Minsan) (also covered by Viva Mix Club, Pilita Corrales, Manilyn Reynes, Lloyd Umali, Wynn Andrada, Lani Misalucha, Kamikazee, Hong Kong singer Jackie Cheung & American saxophonist Warren Hill)
- "Mahal na Mahal Kita" (OST of Shotgun Banjo)
- "Ayoko Na Sana" (also covered by Martin Nievera & Jona Viray)
- "Simple Lang"
- "Without Your Love"
- "Wala Kang Katulad"
- "Minsan Lang Kitang Iibigin" (also covered by Regine Velasquez, Gary V. & Juris Fernandez)
- "Narito Ako" (original by Maricris Belmont and Regine Velasquez)
- "Photograph"
- "Sa Aking Puso" (also covered by Dingdong Avanzado, Jessa Zaragoza & Rachelle Ann Go)
- "Getting to Know Each Other" (original by Gerard Kenny)
- "Sana Ngayong Pasko" (OST of Sana Ngayong Pasko) (also covered by Jed Madela, Moira Dela Torre, Sarah Geronimo, Jovit Baldivino, Juris Fernandez, Daryl Ong, Erik Santos, Darren Espanto, Ronnie Liang, Jolina Magdangal, Silent Sanctuary, Lian Kyla, Lea Salonga, Sharon Cuneta, Heart Evangelista, Lie Reposposa, Piolo Pascual & Kristofer Martin)
- "Silent Night Na Naman" (also covered by Geraldine Roxas and Sexbomb Girls)
- "Narito Na ang Pasko (Paglamig ng Hangin)" (also covered by Bukas Palad Music Ministry & Louie Heredia)
- "A Smile in Your Heart" (original by Jam Morales, also covered by Idelle Martinez & Harana)
- "One More Gift" (original by Bukas Palad)
- "In My Life" (music & lyrics by Raymund Ryan Santes)
- "Tell Me" (feat. Regine Velasquez) (original by Joey Albert, also covered by Janet Arnaiz, Side A & Gary V.)
- "Ngayon at Kailanman" (original by Basil Valdez, also covered by Jona Viray)
- "Tunay na Ligaya" (original by Basil Valdez, also covered by Tony Lambino & Melissa Gibbs)

== Album appearances ==
- Ryan Cayabyab Silver Album (Sony BMG Music Philippines, Inc., 1996)
- The Best of Love Duets (Viva Collection Forever) (Viva Records, 1998)
- Something More (JesCom Foundation, Inc., 2001)
- Signature Hits OPM's Best Vol. 2 (Viva Records Corp. & Vicor Music Corp., 2009)
