= Abot Hanggang Sukdulan =

1989 drama film by Eddie Rodriguez

- Directed by: Eddie Rodriguez
- Screenplay by: Eddie Rodriguez; Jose Javier Reyes
- Story by: Jose Javier Reyes
- Produced by: William C. Leary
- Starring: Snooky Serna; Tonton Gutierrez; Ricky Davao; Vina Morales
- Cinematography: Sergio Lobo
- Edited by: Edgardo "Boy" Vinarao
- Music by: Willy Cruz
- Production company: Viva Films
- Distributed by: Viva Films
- Release date: July 19, 1989
- Running time: 126 minutes
- Country: Philippines
- Languages: Filipino; English

Abot Hanggang Sukdulan is a 1989 Filipino drama film directed by Eddie Rodriguez from a screenplay he co-wrote with Jose Javier Reyes, who solely wrote the story. Starring Snooky Serna, Tonton Gutierrez, Ricky Davao, and Vina Morales, the film follows a newly-engaged woman whose life was ruined when she was raped and abused by an obsessive man.

Produced and distributed by Viva Films, the film was theatrically released on July 19, 1989.

== Plot ==
Young business professional Agnes Paredes lives with her caring family and is engaged to her boyfriend Joe Mari, who is studying at law school. One day at the office, Romano Barredo, the spoiled son of a prominent lawmaker, began an unhealthy obsession with Agnes and wanted to marry her.

On the day of Joe Mari's bar examination, Agnes gave birth. Agnes and Joe Mari reunited and rekindled their feelings. Because of the trauma and impending fears, Joe Mari promised Agnes that he would be on her side. On the following day, Romano informed Agnes that he would be gone to Bataan for two days, much to her relief. However, it was actually a lie, and Romano informed his men to follow her car and told them where she was going. Agnes went to the university library, where she talked with Joe Mari and his mother about their plan to the United States. Unfortunately, the two were caught in the act by Romano and his men, and mauled Joe Mari.

Back at the house, Romano continues to abuse his wife and grounds her. Karen, who was fed up with her brother's abusive actions, decided to help Agnes escape with her child. Though she successfully escaped to her uncle's house, Romano became pissed and decided to abduct Agnes' deaf-mute younger sister, Carmi. Jun saw his sister going inside Romano's car, but he failed to stop him because he was being mauled by his men. Enraged by Romano abducting Carmi (as told by her aunt), Agnes took the prized shotgun belonging to her uncle Ben and decided to kill him. Meanwhile, Joe Mari, who was severely injured, left the hospital to help Agnes.

At the house where Romano and the others are, Agnes killed most of his men after she found Carmi being violated by the former. When Romano showed up, Agnes shot him in the leg before he died when she shot him in his genitals many times as revenge for raping her and her sister. The film ends with the two sisters walking back home.

== Cast ==
- Snooky Serna as Agnes Paredes: The woman who was raped and abused by Romano
- Tonton Gutierrez as Joe Mari: Agnes' fiancé
- Ricky Davao as Romano Barredo: The son of Pol and Inday Barredo, who raped and abused Agnes
- Cathy Mora as Karen Barredo: Romano's sister
- Vina Morales as Carmi Paredes: Agnes' deaf-mute sister
- Richard Reynoso as Jun: Agnes' brother
- Laurice Guillen as Dory Paredes: the Paredes family matriarch
- Robert Arevalo as Ernesto Paredes: the Paredes family patriarch
- Subas Herrero as Pol Barredo: Romano's father, who is a congressman
- Rosemarie Gil as Inday Barredo: Romano's mother
- Imelda Ilanan as Veronica
- Ernie Zarate as Judge
- Gammy Viray as Mr. Bondok
- Koko Trinidad as VP
- Rez Cortez as Rocky: Romano's righthand
- Manjo del Mundo as Mark
- Jordan Catillo as Guz
- Joey Galvez as Announcer
- Augusto Victa as Attorney
- Angelo de Vera as Baby

== Controversy ==
Before the film's release, Lily Monteverde, the founder and executive producer of Regal Films, filed a civil suit against the film's lead actress, Snooky Serna, who was a talent of the said film studio, for alleged breach of contract.

== Awards ==
Year	Awards	Category	Recipient	Result	Ref.
1990	38th FAMAS Awards	Best Actor	Ricky Davao	Won	
1990	38th FAMAS Awards	Best Actress	Snooky Serna	Nominated	
