= 1993 Metro Manila Film Festival =

Film festival edition

- Date: December 25, 1993 to January 3, 1994
- Site: Manila

Highlights
- Best Picture: Kung Mawawala Ka Pa
- Most awards: May Minamahal (9)

The 19th Metro Manila Film Festival was held in 1993.

Reyna Films' Kung Mawawala Ka Pa and Star Cinema's May Minamahal shared top honors in the 1993 Metro Manila Film Festival. Kung Mawawala Ka Pa was awarded Best Picture and received seven other awards including the Best Actress for Dawn Zulueta among others. On the other hand, May Minamahal won nine awards including the Best Actor for the second consecutive time winner Aga Muhlach, Best Director for Jose Javier Reyes, Second Best Picture, and the coveted Gatpuno Antonio J. Villegas Cultural Awards among others.

This year's festival was also the first to feature short films as part of their Short Film Endowment Program, which was organized in collaboration with Mowelfund Film Institute.

== Entries ==
Title	Starring	Studio	Director	Genre
Doring Dorobo: Hagupit ng Batas	Eddie Garcia, Eddie Gutierrez, Boots Anson-Roa, Sharmaine Arnaiz, Paquito Diaz, Rey 'PJ' Abellana, Ali Sotto, Dick Israel, Vivian Foz	LEA Productions	Augusto Salvador	Action
Gaano Kita Kamahal	Christopher de Leon, Lorna Tolentino, Tirso Cruz III, Daniel Fernando, Juan Rodrigo, Marita Zobel, Sylvia Sanchez, Ali Sotto	Pioneer Films	Butch Perez	Drama
Inay	Nora Aunor, Tirso Cruz III, Chanda Romero, Tommy Abuel, Tita Munoz, Orestes Ojeda, Caridad Sanchez, Louella de Cordova, Carol Dauden, Jaclyn Jose, Melanie Marquez	OWNI Films	Artemio Marquez	Drama
Kung Mawawala Ka Pa	Christopher de Leon, Dawn Zulueta, Sarah Jane Abad, Amy Austria, Pilar Pilapil	Reyna Films	Jose Mari Avellana	Drama, Romance
May Minamahal	Aga Muhlach, Aiko Melendez, Boots Anson-Roa, Ronaldo Valdez, Aljon Jimenez, John Estrada, Agot Isidro, Liza Lorena, Marita Zobel, Nikka Valencia, Claudine Barretto	Star Cinema and Regal Films	Jose Javier Reyes	Romance, Comedy
Pusoy Dos	Janno Gibbs, Dennis Padilla, Gelli de Belen, Leo Martinez, Mat Ranillo III, Jackie Aquino	VIVA Films	Jun Aristorenas	Action, Comedy

=== Short Film Endowment Program ===
- Anak Maynila - Nonoy Dadivas (6 min)
- The Good Kisser of Manila - Joey Tam (14 min)
- Isaak - Nick Deocampo (10 min)
- Kamagong - Fruto Corre
- Nene - Grace Amilbangsa
- Kanlungan - Robert Quebral

== Winners and nominees ==
=== Awards ===
Winners are listed first and highlighted in boldface.

Best Film	Best Director
**Kung Mawawala Ka Pa - Reyna Films**; May Minamahal - Star Cinema and Regal Films(2nd Best Picture); Doring Dorobo: Hagupit ng Batas - LEA Productions(3rd Best Picture); Gaano Kita Kamahal - Pioneer Films; Pusoy Dos - VIVA Films; Inay - OWNI Films	**José Javier Reyes – May Minamahal**
Best Actor	Best Actress
**Aga Muhlach – May Minamahal**	**Dawn Zulueta – Kung Mawawala Ka Pa**; Nora Aunor - Inay
Best Supporting Actor	Best Supporting Actress
**Ronaldo Valdez – May Minamahal**	**Amy Austria – Kung Mawawala Ka Pa**
Best Art Direction	Best Cinematography
**Benjie de Guzman – May Minamahal**	**Romy Vitug - Kung Mawawala Ka Pa**
Best Child Performer	Best Editing
**Sarah Jane Abad – Kung Mawawala Ka Pa**	**Augusto Salvador - Doring Dorobo: Hagupit ng Batas**
Best Story	Best Screenplay
**Jose Javier Reyes – May Minamahal**	**Jose Javier Reyes – May Minamahal**
Best Original Song	Best Music
**Kung Mawawala Ka Pa**	**Ryan Cayabyab – Kung Mawawala Ka Pa**
Best Visual Effects	Best Make-up
**Bobby Pineda – Doring Dorobo: Hagupit ng Batas**	**Teresita Dominguez – Gaano Kita Kamahal**
Best Sound Recording	Best Float
**Ramon Reyes - Kung Mawawala Ka Pa**	**May Minamahal - Star Cinema**
Gatpuno Antonio J. Villegas Cultural Awards	Short Films
**May Minamahal - Star Cinema**	Anak Maynila - Dir. Nonoy Dadivas

== Multiple awards ==
Awards	Film
9	May Minamahal
8	Kung Mawawala Ka Pa
3	Doring Dorobo: Hagupit ng Batas

== Controversies ==
=== Winners' list leakage ===
During the "Gabi ng Parangal" held in the PICC Plenary Hall, December 27 of Monday night, a supposed leakage of the list of winners marred that year's awards presentation.

Preceded by 1992 Metro Manila Film Festival	Metro Manila Film Festival; 1993	Succeeded by 1994 Metro Manila Film Festival
