= My Guardian Debil =

1998 comedy film by Jun Urbano

- Directed by: Jun Urbano
- Written by: Jun Urbano
- Produced by: Butch Jimenez; Jimmy Duavit
- Starring: Jimmy Santos
- Cinematography: Raul Ona
- Edited by: Danny Gloria
- Music by: Nonong Buencamino
- Production companies: GMA Films; Film Experts
- Distributed by: GMA Films
- Release date: March 25, 1998
- Running time: 100 minutes
- Country: Philippines
- Languages: Filipino; English

My Guardian Debil is a 1998 Philippine comedy film written and directed by Jun Urbano. The film stars Jimmy Santos in the title role.

== Plot ==
Set in a trilogy narrative, Dimawari is a minor demon who wants to become one of the major devils in Hell. He was sent by Tartaro to Earth to deceive people to commit sins and bring their souls to hell. He was given three chances to do so. Otherwise, he cannot return to Hell.

His first prospect was Nato, an upright policeman living in poverty whose son Boyet suffered an accident and needed a big amount of money for a life-saving operation. Pretending to be a fellow policeman, he tempts Nato to join a robbery operation against a big bank. Nato agrees, only to nearly lose his life after turning against his fellow robbers. After he survives, he was rewarded with a promotion and financial assistance for the apprehension of the robbery group.

Dimawari's second prospect was Sabel, a beautiful and innocent poor girl who wants to make it big as a fashion celebrity model to get her parents out of poverty. Resisting the courtship advances of Raul to focus on her dream, Dimawari poses as a gay talent scout convincing Sabel to visit the house of Mr. Dom, a sleazy movie producer, for an audition as a movie actress. Mr. Dom tries to make sexual advances towards Sabel during the audition but ends up badly injured after Sabel pushed him off the balcony of his home. With her dream in shatters, Sabel ends up agreeing to Raul's courtship proposal, becoming his girlfriend.

Dimawari's third prospect was Lalaw, an ordinary taho vendor who dreams of attracting people and draw them under his influence. This time disguising as a hunchback, Dimawari makes Lalaw believe he has magical powers to heal people from their sickness. Lalaw became popular in their town due to his healing abilities that came from Dimawari's magic. However, when Tartaro appears to claim Lalaw's soul in an apparent belief that Dimawari had succeeded after 2 failed attempts, Dimawari intervenes and the two devils struggle for supremacy. In the process, Lalaw loses his healing ability and gets beaten up by a group of people for being a fraud.

Dimawari was supposed be put to death by Tartaro for failing in all three attempts. However, the Eskribong Anghel (Scribed Angel) and his army came to Dimawari's rescue and puts Tartaro back to his rightful place in Hell. It turns out that the Angels came to rescue Dimawari because he was misclassified as a demon by St. Peter. As a result, Dimawari gets transformed into an angel, and finally goes to Heaven with them.

== Cast ==
- Jimmy Santos as Dimawari
- Ronnie Ricketts as Nato
- Chin Chin Gutierrez as Sabel
- Earl Ignacio as Lalaw
- Junix Inocian as Tartaro
- Tonton Gutierrez as Raul
- Lucita Soriano as Aling Mila
- Renato del Prado as Mang Pete
- Matutina as Dalay
- Lester Llansang as Boyet
- Noel Trinidad as Mr. Dom
- Koko Trinidad as Eskribong Anghel
- Ruby Solmerano as Kapitana
- Maning Rivera as Preacher
- Joanne Salazar as Angel
- Kim Hartwig as Angel
- Olivia Wiazan as Angel
- Bernadete Ang as Angel
- Philip Supnet as Another Man

== Reception ==
Isah Red of the Manila Standard gave My Guardian Debil a mixed review, calling it a decent film. He praised Jimmy Santos for giving his "character just the right amount of comic touches to make him pathetically funny" and his departure from his carabao English acts. However, he criticizes the film for its lack of comic tension, stating that "the gags seem more serious than funny".

== See also ==
- List of films about angels
