= May Minamahal (film) =

1993 romantic comedy-drama film by Jose Javier Reyes

- The poster of the restored version
- Directed by: Jose Javier Reyes
- Written by: Jose Javier Reyes
- Produced by: Charo Santos-Concio; Lily Y. Monteverde; Simon C. Ongpin
- Starring: Aga Muhlach; Aiko Melendez
- Cinematography: Arnold Alvaro; Jun Pereira
- Edited by: George Jarlego
- Music by: Nonong Buencamino
- Production company: Star Cinema
- Distributed by: ABS-CBN Film Productions
- Release dates: December 25, 1993 (Philippines); September 15, 1996 (Japan); February 21, 2018 (Restored 4K version)
- Running time: 118 minutes
- Country: Philippines
- Language: Filipino

May Minamahal (English: Loving Someone) is a 1993 Filipino romantic comedy-drama film written and directed by Jose Javier Reyes. Starring Aga Muhlach and Aiko Melendez in their first film together in leading roles, the film revolves around the romance between a young man, the only son of an all-female family, and a young girl, the only daughter of an all-male family. It also stars Boots Anson-Roa, Ronaldo Valdez, Claudine Barretto, Agot Isidro, Nikka Valencia, John Estrada, Aljon Jimenez, and Ogie Diaz.

A first romantic drama film and third film overall produced by Star Cinema, it was theatrically released on December 25, 1993, as one of the entries for the 19th Metro Manila Film Festival, where it won nine awards out of 19 nominations, including Best Director, Best Actor, Best Supporting Actor, and Best Screenplay. The film became a box office hit and received acclaim from critics and various award-giving organizations.

In 2007, it was adapted into a television series of the same name by ABS-CBN as the third installment of Sineserye Presents. In 2018, the film was digitally restored and remastered in 4K high definition by ABS-CBN Film Restoration and L'Immagine Ritrovata.

== Plot ==
With the death of Ronald, who suffered a heart attack while preparing for their family picnic, Carlitos, the only son, was informed by his aunt Gloria that he is now the family patriarch. He then consoles his mother, Becky, and siblings about his passing. As the man of the house, he takes care of all the responsibilities, particularly the finances and properties. The following day, at the company, when Carlitos is invited by his workmates to eat lunch at the cafeteria, he meets Monica, but she becomes offended when he stares at her and teases her.

Back at home, the whole Tagle family gathered to discuss their finances and assets, including the vehicles, and decided to sell their family van despite the complaints from Mandy. Soon after, Carlitos begins a short conversation with Monica, who is working on her assignments. Later, Carlitos became pressured by the problems involving criticisms from his sister, Trina, and her boyfriend about the van being sold at a lower price, as well as his verbal confrontation with his younger sister, Mandy, for staying out late with her boyfriend. Becky reminds her son that as long as he is the patriarch, she is still his mother.

At the supermarket, Carlitos and Monica meet again, with the former inviting her to eat merienda. Monica agrees to join, where they will eat and exchange stories, particularly talking about their interests like sports and movies. At night, Carlitos returns home from Monica's car and promises to call her later on the telephone. As Monica returns home, she is scolded by her older brother Bombit due to her use of his car, and she handles the cooking for dinner instead. A few moments later, Carlitos and Monica resume their exchange of stories via telephone, with the former being witnessed by his sisters. On the following sunny day, the whole Tagle family is bonded together, and Carlitos assures his mother that he will take care of all their family obligations.

To see Monica, Carlitos pays a visit to her household, and he meets her family consisting of her father Cenon, older brothers Bombit and Jun, and cousin Didoy. He, along with Monica's whole family, began bonding together while eating lunch. On the night of their first date, Carlitos and Monica are at the fancy restaurant, but they go to the delicious carinderia that serves delicious mami noodles instead, as insisted by the latter. After a few days, his mother and three sisters began noticing Carlitos' new lifestyle, including the use of cologne, suspecting that he had a girlfriend. At the family reunion of their relatives returning from overseas, Carlitos introduces Monica to his family. A few meetings later, Monica seriously asked Carlitos if he wanted to be her boyfriend, and he agreed, and the two became a couple.

As days pass, the relations between Carlitos and his family go sour when he begins focusing on Monica and office work rather than on the obligations that their family needs to pay, as well as time for bonding. While Carlitos and Monica spent their time in San Pablo, Becky was sent to the hospital, but he almost argued with his sister Mandy about his time with his girlfriend. After several missed calls, Monica becomes disappointed, and when Carlitos shows up, the two begin a heated argument between each other.

In the end, the conflict was resolved when Carlitos and Monica reconciled. Later on, they finally married, with their respective families being present to witness their ceremony.

== Cast ==
Character	Actor
Carlitos Tagle	Aga Muhlach; Rex Agoncillo (8 y/o); Aaron Muhlach (11 y/o); Isko Moreno (15 y/o)
The only son of Ronald and Becky. After his father's death, he became the patriarch of the family, and he handled the responsibilities that his late father had left behind. He met Monica at the company's cafeteria, and their meeting turned into a romantic relationship. He is 24 years old and works at the bank's financial department.
Monica Fernandez	Aiko Melendez
The only daughter of Cenon and his unnamed deceased wife. She is a college student and a part-time worker at the cafeteria run by her aunt. At the same time, she meets Carlitos and their friendship turns into a romance. She is 20 years old and classified as a tsundere.
Rebecca "Becky" Tagle	Boots Anson-Roa
Carlitos and his sisters' loving mother and Ronald's husband.
Ronald Tagle	Ramil Rodriguez
Becky's husband and a loving father to Carlitos and his three sisters. He died of a heart attack while planning for a trip to Tagaytay. His only son assumes the role of the patriarch, where he would handle all the responsibilities and obligations he had left.
Cenon Fernandez	Ronaldo Valdez
Monica and her brothers' loving widowed father. He owns a lot of jeepneys and works as a jeepney driver and mechanic.
Trina Tagle	Agot Isidro; Myla De Jesus (18 y/o)
The first of Carlitos' three sisters, and she is the eldest. She works at an advertising agency and usually goes home late at night.
Leo	Aljon Jimenez
One of Carlitos' workmates in the company.
Bombit Fernandez	John Estrada
The first of Monica's two rowdy older brothers. He is a black belt in judo.
Ines	Liza Lorena
The first of Becky's two closest sisters. She is a businesswoman.
Pinky Tagle	Claudine Barretto; Patricia Ann Roque (3 y/o)
The second of Carlitos' three sisters, and she is the youngest. She has been very close to her brother ever since their father died.
Gloria	Marita Zobel
The aunt of Carlitos and his sisters and Becky's sister. She is the wife of Felix.
Jun Fernandez	Bimbo Bautista
The last of Monica's two rowdy older brothers. He is a varsity player on both the basketball and baseball teams.
Mandy Tagle	Nikka Valencia; Michelle Suzara (9 y/o); Maria Lourdes Araneta (10 y/o)
The last of Carlitos' three sisters, and she is the second youngest. She usually had arguments with her brother.
Didoy	Ogie Diaz
The effeminate brother of the Fernandez family. He was constantly pranked and harassed by Bombit.
Ellen	Gina Leviste
Carlitos' boss at the company.
Mrs. Teresing	Malou Crisologo
Cenon's cousin sister and also the aunt of Monica and her two brothers.

=== Also starring ===
- George Lim as Tito Momoy
- Ernie Zarate as Tito Felix, one of the uncles of Carlitos and his sisters, and Gloria's husband
- Teri Baylosis as Tito Manolo, one of the uncles of Carlitos and his sisters
- Fina Peralejo as Sandra, one of Carlitos and his workmates' co-workers
- Angie Roy as Atty. Caroline Pedrosa, the lawyer of the Tagle family
- Alma Lerma as Manang Belen, one of the Tagle family's house helpers
- Paolo Zobel as Sammy
- Melvin Viceral as Spanky
- Leilani Terrobias as Susan, a co-worker of Carlitos and his workmates
- Ed Murillo as Mr. Capili, the man who is negotiating the price of buying the van from Carlitos

== Production and development ==
May Minamahal began its development in early 1993 when Star Cinema, the film's producer and distributor, began its existence as a joint venture between ABS-CBN Broadcasting Corporation and Regal Films on May 8, 1993. (Note: Through official information, Adan Ronquillo: Tubong Cavite, Laking Tondo, also in 1993, was first produced by Regal Films and distributed by Star Cinema; making it as their first film of the company.)

=== Casting ===
Aga Muhlach and Aiko Melendez previously appeared in the 1992 film, Sinungaling Mong Puso, before they were cast in the film. Muhlach previously worked with writer-director Jose Javier Reyes through the MMFF entry from the previous year, Bakit Labis Kitang Mahal, where the latter served as the director and the former as one of the film's three lead stars, alongside Ariel Rivera and Lea Salonga.

May Minamahal is also the first Star Cinema project for Agot Isidro, Nikka Valencia, Boots Anson-Roa (it served as her comeback film after living overseas), and Claudine Barretto as well as the two cast members of ABS-CBN's then-youth variety show Ang TV: Fina Peralejo and Lailani Terrobias. Then-newcomer Isko Moreno, who began his prominence in the entertainment landscape in 1993, was cast as the high school-aged Carlitos and it served as his major break, alongside his hosting performances at GMA Network's variety show That's Entertainment.

=== Filming ===
A few of the film's personnel and resources were from Regal Films, as well as the filming unit itself. The film was shot around Metro Manila, particularly in the city of San Juan, where they shot scenes set in the Fernandez family household.

=== Music ===
The film's theme song, May Minamahal, originally sung by Hajji Alejandro in 1977, was performed by Agot Isidro and composed by Willy Cruz.

== Release ==
=== Theatrical ===
Star Cinema theatrically released the film on December 25, 1993, as one of the entries for the 19th Metro Manila Film Festival. It was first opened to 42 movie theaters in the whole Metro Manila region and its neighboring provinces. This was Aga Muhlach's last Metro Manila Film Festival participation before he made his comeback in 2019 through the Philippine adaptation of Miracle in Cell No. 7.

May Minamahal was also premiered in Japan on September 15, 1996, as part of the 6th Fukuoka International Film Festival, screened with Japanese and English subtitles. The film's Japanese title is Crazy About You (Japanese: あなたに夢中で, Hepburn: Anatanimuchū de). It was re-released again for exhibition on March 5, 1997, as part of the showing of Filipino films sponsored by The Japan Foundation in Tokyo.

=== Home media ===
May Minamahal was released on home video by Regal Home Video in Philippine markets in 1994 and overseas markets in 2002.

=== Digital restoration ===
The film's restored version premiered on February 21, 2018, at Power Plant Mall - Cinema 1 in Makati, Metro Manila, as part of the annual "Reelive the Classics" exhibition. The premiere was attended by the film's writer-director Joey Javier Reyes; cast members Boots Anson Roa-Rodrigo, Aiko Melendez, Aga Muhlach, Agot Isidro, Nikka Valencia, Ogie Diaz, Bimbo Bautista, and Malou Crisologo; line producer JoAnn Cabalda Bañaga; production assistant Gay Ace Domingo; and the family of producer Simon C. Ongpin.

== Reception ==
=== Critical response ===
Jullie Y. Daza, a columnist writing for Manila Standard, described the film as a "fresh new moment in Philippine cinema" and gave praise towards its dialogue, performances of the cast (particularly Muhlach and Valdez), and the appeal to the movie-going audience.

=== Legacy ===
May Minamahal is one of the Filipino films whose 35mm film prints are currently stored and preserved at the Fukuoka City Public Library Archives in Fukuoka City, Fukuoka Prefecture, Japan.

=== Accolades ===
Year	Award-Giving Body	Category	Recipient	Result
1993	Metro Manila Film Festival	Best Picture	May Minamahal	2nd
1993	Metro Manila Film Festival	Best Director	Jose Javier Reyes	Won
1993	Metro Manila Film Festival	Best Actor	Aga Muhlach	Won
1993	Metro Manila Film Festival	Best Supporting Actor	Ronaldo Valdez	Won
1993	Metro Manila Film Festival	Best Art Direction	Benjie de Guzman	Won
1993	Metro Manila Film Festival	Best Story	Jose Javier Reyes	Won
1993	Metro Manila Film Festival	Best Screenplay	Jose Javier Reyes	Won
1993	Metro Manila Film Festival	Best Float	May Minamahal	Won
1993	Metro Manila Film Festival	Gatpuno Antonio J. Villegas Cultural Awards	May Minamahal	Won
1994	Gawad Urian Awards	Best Picture	May Minamahal	Nominated
1994	Gawad Urian Awards	Best Direction	Jose Javier Reyes	Nominated
1994	Gawad Urian Awards	Best Leading Actor	Aga Muhlach	Nominated
1994	Gawad Urian Awards	Best Music	Dionisio "Nonong" Buencamino	Nominated
1994	Gawad Urian Awards	Best Editor	George Jarlego	Nominated
1994	Gawad Urian Awards	Best Supporting Actor	Ronaldo Valdez	Won
1994	FAMAS Awards	Best Picture	May Minamahal	Nominated
1994	FAMAS Awards	Best Story	Jose Javier Reyes	Won
1994	FAMAS Awards	Best Director	Jose Javier Reyes	Nominated
1994	FAMAS Awards	Best Leading Actor	Aga Muhlach	Nominated
1994	FAMAS Awards	Best Supporting Actor	Ronaldo Valdez	Won
1994	FAMAS Awards	Best Supporting Actress	Boots Anson-Roa	Nominated

== Television adaptation ==
In 2007, May Minamahal was remade into a TV series by ABS-CBN as the third installment for Sineserye Presents. The lead characters were played by Anne Curtis and Oyo Boy Sotto.
