= Radio Romance (film) =

1996 slice of life romantic comedy film by Jose Javier Reyes

- Directed by: Jose Javier Reyes
- Written by: Jose Javier Reyes
- Story by: Mia Concio Imperial; Jose Javier Reyes
- Produced by: Charo Santos-Concio; Malou N. Santos
- Starring: Gelli de Belen; Paolo Abrera; Claudine Barretto; Rico Yan; Sharmaine Arnaiz; Robin Da Roza; John Estrada
- Cinematography: Ricardo O. Jacinto
- Edited by: Danilo "Danny" Gloria
- Music by: Jessie Q. Lasaten
- Production company: Star Cinema
- Distributed by: Star Cinema
- Release date: February 14, 1996
- Running time: 123 minutes
- Country: Philippines
- Language: Filipino

Radio Romance is a 1996 Philippine slice of life romantic comedy film written and directed by Jose Javier Reyes from an original story developed by Mia Concio Imperial. The film's title is derived from DWRR-FM's then-branding Radio Romance, used from July 1989 to April 1996. The film stars Gelli de Belen, Paolo Abrera, Claudine Barretto, Rico Yan (who was introduced in this film), Sharmaine Arnaiz, Robin Da Roza, and John Estrada in the lead roles while supporting casts include Jolina Magdangal, Gina Pareño, father-and-son Koko and Noel Trinidad, Amable Quiambao, Nikka Valencia, Ogie Diaz, Ernie Zarate, and Malou Crisologo.

Produced and released by Star Cinema, it was theatrically premiered on February 14, 1996, as the film studio's Valentine's Day offering. The film predated the 2003 British-American romantic comedy film Love Actually and Japanese romance anime Tsuredure Children. It also marked the first film where Claudine Barretto and Rico Yan paired up together.

As part of the film's 25th anniversary, the film was digitally restored and remastered in 4K resolution by ABS-CBN Film Restoration and Central Digital Lab, and it was digitally released on January 14, 2021, via KTX.ph.

== Synopsis ==
Veronica is a young woman who works as a librarian at a university during the daytime and spends her time writing. Unknown to many, she led a secret life as a radio DJ at night where she hosted a radio program where she read love letters sent by her listeners, offered them advice, and played the requested songs. One day, during the program, she read a letter from her secret admirer who wanted to see her in person. Even though she addresses the love problems of her audience, Veronica would have to address her own love problem.

== Cast ==
- Gelli de Belen as Veronica/DJ Roni Night, a young woman who lived a double life as a librarian during the day and a radio DJ during the night
- Paolo Abrera as Jed Montinola, a man who recently moved into the same compound as Veronica
- Claudine Barretto as Marian Cordero, a quiet and introverted computer programming student
- Rico Yan as Gary Balmaceda, a fellow computer programmer whom Marian accidentally met at the nightclub
- Sharmaine Arnaiz as Babsy Fernandez, a young college student who has an OJT session at a marketing company
- Robin Da Roza as Raffy Molina, a young business executive whom Babsy met while on her OJT session
- John Estrada as Lester Carmona, Babsy's rowdy boyfriend
- Jolina Magdangal as Willia "Willie" Acosta, Marian's happy-go-lucky best friend
- Noel Trinidad as Bong Cordero, Marian and her siblings' father
- Gina Pareño as Mercedes "Ched" Cordero, Marian and her siblings' mother who runs a baking business
- Eula Valdez as Mylene Cordero, Marian's sister
- Jason Zamora as Christopher Cordero, Marian's brother
- Koko Trinidad as Monching Palacios, Viring's husband and the landlord
- Ama Quiambao as Viring Palacios, Monching's wife and the landlady
- Nikka Valencia as Lizbeth
- Joshua Zamora as Eugene
- Malou Crisologo as Meldy Faustino, the first of Veronica's two workmates at the university
- Lito Villareal as Boni Aguas, Meldy's boyfriend who is a professor from the university's physics department
- Ogie Diaz as Loy, the last of Veronica's two workmates at the university
- Ernie Zarate as Fernando Balmaceda, Gary's father

== Production ==
The original story of the film was developed by Mia Concio-Imperial for Star Cinema and is used to boost the popularity of ABS-CBN's FM radio station, DWRR-FM 101.9, which was then branded as Radio Romance. Writer-director Jose Javier Reyes joined the project after he was informed by the film studio heads, Malou N. Santos and Olivia M. Lamasan, that they needed him to expand the storyline and then, he ended up as the director of the project.

The original story treatment by Concio-Imperial revolves around the life of a young woman named Veronica, who is a librarian during the daytime, and by nighttime, she becomes a radio DJ under the name "Roni Night". When Reyes joined the project, he expanded the story which not only revolved around her and the secret admirer but also a set of characters who are tuning into her radio show for love advice. As a result of his numerous additions to the story, the project became an "ensemble film", which Reyes had already done fourteen years prior when he wrote the screenplay of Peque Gallaga's violent war drama classic Oro, Plata, Mata.

Because the studio gave the production team a deadline, the dialogues spoken by the characters throughout the film are recorded in live sound rather than being dubbed in post-production, citing that they have no time to do the latter.

== Music ==
According to writer-director Jose Javier Reyes, Star Cinema approved his idea to work with the vocal group The Company to produce a soundtrack for the film. Besides the produced soundtrack and musical score provided by Jessie Lasaten, the film also used the station's jingle of the same name as the film, composed and performed by singer-songwriter Jose Mari Chan.

== Reception ==
=== Lists ===
In 2012, Spot.ph ranked it number 9 in its list titled "Top 10 Pinoy Romcoms".
