= Shake, Rattle & Roll IV =

1992 film by Peque Gallaga and Lore Reyes

- Theatrical release poster
- Directed by: Peque Gallaga; Lore Reyes
- Screenplay by: Jerry Lopez Sineneng
- Story by: Peque Gallaga; Lore Reyes; Don Escudero
- Produced by: Joey Gosiengfiao (supervising)
- Starring: Janice de Belen; Manilyn Reynes; Aiko Melendez; Edu Manzano; Miguel Rodriguez; Al Tantay; Aljon Jimenez; Nida Blanca; Gina Alajar; Aiza Seguerra; IC Mendoza
- Cinematography: Joe Tutanes
- Edited by: Danny Gloria
- Music by: Archie Castillo
- Production company: Regal Films
- Distributed by: Regal Films
- Release date: December 25, 1992
- Running time: 113 minutes
- Country: Philippines
- Language: Filipino

Shake, Rattle & Roll IV is a 1992 Filipino horror anthology film and the fourth installment of the Shake, Rattle & Roll film series, following the third film in 1991. It is produced by Regal Films, and was directed by Peque Gallaga and Lore Reyes. It is an entry to the 1992 Metro Manila Film Festival.

The film consists of three stories: a college student discovers her chemistry professor transforms into a monster after drinking a potion; a neighborhood is terrorized when a monster living in a park tree kidnaps children; and a slum community discovers a church nun is secretly a manananggal responsible for local murders.

The film was originally meant to be the final installment in the series up until the release of the fifth installment, Shake, Rattle & Roll V, in 1994.

== Plot ==
=== "Ang Guro" ===
Jodie Abesamis is a college student of Mr. Zerrudo's chemistry class who fell in love with him. While in their class, Mabu, Jodie's boyfriend, makes an invention and accidentally fires it towards their dean, Ms. Bautista. One night, Jodie is still in the computer room finishing her project with Mabu. While working, Mabu gets mad at Jodie after she got insulted by Mr. Zerrudo during class because of daydreaming.

One day, Jodie daydreams about marrying Mr. Zerrudo and then attacks her without getting any help from the guests. Gretch, Jodie's friend, wakes her up and tells her that they should go to Mr. Zerrudo's lab later in the day to tell their feelings for him. After this, Mabu asks for Jodie's forgiveness while Jodie accepts it and admits that she actually has feelings for Mr. Zerrudo.

In the afternoon, Gretch, with Jodie, goes to Mr. Zerrudo's lab and catches him making and drinking a potion. Gretch tries to seduce Mr. Zerrudo but the potion turns him into a monster. Mr. Zerrudo attacks Gretch and kills her. Jodie escapes and tries to tell Dean Bautista about what happened but she doesn't listen to her, thinking that it's just an excuse for her failing grade in Mr. Zerrudo's class. Mr. Zerrudo suddenly appears and tells Jodie to meet him in the lab at night to take a test for her failing grade.

That night, Jodie enters Mr. Zerrudo's lab and makes a potion to stop Mr. Zerrudo from attacking her. Jodie tries to escape but is cornered by Mr. Zerrudo. Mabu and Dean Bautista, who are still in the school to talk about giving Mabu remedial classes after failing, go to Mr. Zerrudo's lab and find Jodie getting attacked. Mr. Zerrudo catches them and decides to attack and kill Dean Bautista instead, letting Jodie and Mabu escape.

As Jodie and Mabu try to leave, they meet the janitor and Mr. Zerrudo tosses him to a door, dying on impact. While they escape, Mr. Zerrudo catches up to them and attacks Mabu. When Mr. Zerrudo leaves to find Jodie, Jodie helps Mabu stand up and leave, only to get cornered by a gate, separating them from Mr. Zerrudo. Mr. Zerrudo is able to bend the gate as Jodie and Mabu head back to the lab.

While inside, Mabu tries to make his invention again while Jodie barricades the door. Mr. Zerrudo breaks the door and attacks Jodie, only to be hit by Mabu's invention and is seemingly killed. As Jodie and Mabu begin celebrating, Mr. Zerrudo grasps Jodie's foot, but Mabu successfully kills him permanently.

=== "Ang Kapitbahay" ===
The family of architect Rod Mallari is about to move to a new apartment house. As he and his wife get into a heated argument, their daughter Nikkie, snoops over their argument and is caught by her nanny Gi and explains what Nikkie's parents are fighting over. Tising, another nanny, calls Nikkie so that they can go to the playground to say goodbye to her friends.

While Tising, Nikkie, and Juni, Nikkie's sibling, are at the playground, a dog named Cha-cha disappears despite being tied to a tree with a leash. Soon, Nikkie catches a monster taking Juni out of her crib and kidnaps her to its tree. When Nikkie tells Tising about what happened, Tising doesn't believe her and calls the barrio's captain, Capt. Salvi, and lieutenant, Lt. Damaso, instead. The parents, who treat Juni as their own child, attack Tising who is held responsible for the disappearance.

When Nikkie sees Tising getting mobbed, she tries to explain about seeing the monster kidnapping Juni, but no one believes her and still attacks Tising. Tising is instructed to go to prison to be interrogated. When everyone goes home, Nikkie goes back to the monster's tree to confront it, but the monster throws a bone at her instead, causing her to leave.

At night, Nikkie tells Yaya Gi about what happened. Yaya Gi believes her and tells her that the monster is called a Witawit. The Witawit are creatures who live in trees they like and capture children when they are upset at people who cut trees they live in. It just happens that children are the ones that play near trees and that's why they are the ones that get captured.

While Nikkie is asleep, the Witawit enters the house and makes different noises, causing Nikkie to wake up. Nikkie encounters the Witawit while she tries to find Yaya Gi and screams. When she goes upstairs, Tising, getting desperate, appears with a knife and tells Nikkie that they should go to the mango tree to find Juni.

While at the apartment, Nikkie's father feels that something is wrong, and they should go back to the house. In the playground, Tising orders Nikkie to climb the tree to find Juni and never go down unless she finds her. Nikkie, in the tree, finds her friends Shiela, Bambi, and Andrew trapped in cages with Juni. Her friends tell her that they are hostages because of the Witawit getting worried about his tree getting cut. They also tell her that it was Cha-cha's bone that the Witawit threw at her and the Witawit can communicate with them through their minds without talking at all.

Bambi asks Nikkie to help them escape but the Witawit appears before they can leave the tree. While this was happening, Nikkie's parents arrive back home, and the captain and lieutenant find Tising waiting at the mango tree. Tising, having no more patience left, decides to cut the Witawit's tree, hurting the Witawit as well. The Witawit, begging Nikkie's help to stop Tising from cutting the tree. Tising complies and Nikkie tells the Witawit that Tising and the others don't know anything about its problem and that it should return Nikkie and her friends back so that they can tell the problems on its behalf.

The Witawit and Nikkie reconcile, and the creature let the children go, with Tising, the captain, lieutenant, Yaya Gi, and Nikkie's parents seeing it all happen. After a few days, the Witawit's tree stays at the playground and Nikkie's family moves to their new apartment. Nikkie, worried that the tree might be cut when they leave, is told by Yaya Gi to promise not to let any tree get cut as long as she goes anywhere. Nikkie promises and the episode closes with a shot of the kids painting the tree's trunk.

=== "Ang Madre" ===
In the slums of Mandaluyong, lives a family consisting of Astrude, Puri, and Puri's young son Teks. Their next-door neighbors, Adobe and his sons, caution them that a manananggal prowls their community. Later that night, Adobe and his sons are attacked and killed by the manananggal as Puri and her family helplessly watch from inside their cart shack. The manananggal then briefly attacks their home before fleeing.

The next day, Puri brings Teks to the local clinic to be examined by Dr. Apol. Puri thanks Dr. Apol for serving their destitute community, however, when she tells him about the manananggal, he dismisses it as an urban legend. Sr. Mary John, a religious sister who works at the clinic, overhears them and tells them not to fear a mythical creature but instead fear people who do actual evil. Later that night, as they are about to sleep, Teks senses someone sneaking outside their home. His scream alerts Puri and Astrude, who head out to investigate. Instead, they find the manananggal caught in a television antenna. Puri and Astrude hide in fear until the manananggal escapes, after which they find a bag of clothes and food outside their home. Meanwhile, Teks attempts to tail the person he sensed, but ends up finding the manananggal's lower body in a run-down warehouse, he then rushes back to the anxious Puri and Astrude. In the morning, Teks returns to the run-down warehouse and finds Sr. Mary John emerging from it.

Later that day, news spreads of another manananggal attack the previous midnight, but Puri is confused as she saw the manananggal entangled at that time. A mob led by madam Monang attempt to lynch Aling Iya, whom they suspect to be the manananggal. Iya, a disheveled old woman, is known to roam the neighborhood at night. Dr. Apol shields Aling Iya, and reveals to the mob that Iya actually roams at night to anonymously deliver gifts to the poor (including the bag of clothes and food that Puri received). Dr. Apol proceeds to admonish the mob for judging Iya based on her appearance. In the crowd of onlookers, Sr. Mary John ends up beside Puri and Teks, and the latter tells his mother that Mary John is the actual manananggal. Puri scolds her son and apologizes to the sister.

That night, Teks collects hot sauce and salt from the disco where Astrude works as a rapper and convinces her that Sr. Mary John is the manananggal. Astrude accompanies the boy to the run-down warehouse, where they witness Mary John's transformation into a manananggal. She then proceeds to attack them, wounding Astrude. Teks finds Mary John's lower body and pours hot sauce and salt on it. Sensing this, Mary John corners Teks, but is stabbed with a stake by Puri, who had followed them. Teks then squirts hot sauce on Mary John, who bursts into sparks. Puri and Teks reunite with an injured Astrude, who requests them to call for help. However, another manananggal appears—Dr. Apol. Puri confronts him for his pretense of benevolence and battles him while Teks pours hot sauce on the doctor's lower body. Puri holds Apol at bay until the sunrise burns him. Puri and Teks celebrate.

== Cast ==
=== Ang Guro ===
- Manilyn Reynes as Jodie Abesamis
- Edu Manzano as Arturo "Bodjie" Zerrudo
- Aljon Jimenez as Mabu
- Sunshine Cruz as Gretch Mati
- Nida Blanca† as Dean Leticia Bautista
- Koko Trinidad as Priest
- Mae-Anne Adonis as Ms. Pecatoste
- Dido de la Paz as Mr. Abesamis
- Tom Alvarez as the Janitor
- Mon Confiado as Bestman

=== Ang Kapitbahay ===
- Janice de Belen as Tising
- Aiza Seguerra as Nikkie Mallari
- Al Tantay as Architect Rod Mallari
- Malou de Guzman as Mrs. Mallari
- Vangie Labalan as Yaya Gi
- Phillip Gamboa as Capt. Salvi
- Romy Romulo as Lt. Damaso
- Lady Lee as Bambi
- Ram Mojica as Andrew
- Rea Xeniana as Sheila
- Gigette Reyes as Mrs. Manahan
- Mely Tagasa† as Mrs. Baltazar
- Idda Yaneza as Andrew's mother
- Minnie Aguilar as Sheila's mother
- Rene Hinojales as Witawit

=== Ang Madre ===
- Gina Alajar as Puri
- Miguel Rodriguez as Dr. Apol
- Aiko Melendez as Sister Mary John
- Ai-Ai delas Alas as Astrude
- IC Mendoza as Teks
- Bella Flores as Mama Monang
- Lilia Cuntapay as Aling Iya
- Jinky Laurel as Madonna
- Fame de los Santos as Sheena
- Mel Kimura as Whitney
- Rey Solo as Adobe
- Edison Magno as Bogs
- Pen Medina as N.G.O. Member
- Jasmine Vargas as Member of Church

== Accolades ==
Year	Award-giving Body	Award	Recipient	Result
1992	Metro Manila Film Festival	Best Actress	Gina Alajar (segment "Ang Madre")	Won
1992	Metro Manila Film Festival	Best Art Direction	Don Escudero	Won
1992	Metro Manila Film Festival	Best Child Performer	IC Mendoza	Won
1992	Metro Manila Film Festival	Best Make-up	Andrea Manahan	Won

== Home video ==
Shake, Rattle & Roll IV was released on VHS by Regal Home Video in 1993.

== See also ==
- Shake, Rattle & Roll (film series)
- List of ghost films
