= Nag-iisang Ikaw =

1996 drama film by Jose Javier Reyes

- Directed by: Jose Javier Reyes
- Written by: Jose Javier Reyes
- Produced by: Eric Cuatico
- Starring: Mikee Cojuangco; Keempee de Leon; Matthew Mendoza
- Cinematography: George Tutanes
- Edited by: Joyce Bernal
- Music by: Vehnee Saturno
- Production company: Neo Films
- Distributed by: Viva Films
- Release date: October 21, 1996
- Running time: 100 minutes
- Country: Philippines
- Language: Filipino

Nag-iisang Ikaw is a 1996 Philippine drama film written and directed by Jose Javier Reyes. The film stars Mikee Cojuangco, Keempee de Leon and Matthew Mendoza.

The film is streaming online on YouTube.

== Cast ==
- Mikee Cojuangco as Cissy Alejo
- Keempee de Leon as Aaron Buenaventura
- Matthew Mendoza as Albert Corrales
- Kate Fernandez as Lisa
- Noel Trinidad as Noel Alejo
- Marita Zobel as Martha Alejo
- Cherry Pie Picache as Kellu Alejo
- Lee Robin Salazar as Mark Alejo
- Lui Villaruz as Louie Alejo
- Marissa Delgado as Janet Corrales
- Archie Ventosa as Pepito Corrales
- Manny Castañeda as Ben
- Menggie Cobarrubias as Tony
- Terry Baylosis as Nonito
- Blaise Gacoscos as Tirso
- Ed Murillo as Andy
- Raquel Villavicencio as Gigi Pilapil
- Malou Crisologo as Elliene Montinola
- Happy Lopez as Happy Lopez
- Alvin de Gamo as Ritchie
- Jackie Castillejos as Madeline
- Ava Grande as Kimberly
- Malou O'Connor as Debbie
- Ferdie Lagman as Real Estate Broker
- Ogie Diaz as Ato
- Mel Kimura as Cheche
