= Andres Manambit: Angkan ng Matatapang =

1992 biographical action film by Ike Jarlego Jr.

- Directed by: Ike Jarlego Jr.
- Screenplay by: Humilde "Meek" Roxas
- Produced by: William C. Leary
- Starring: Eddie Garcia
- Cinematography: Jose Batac Jr.
- Edited by: Ike Jarlego Jr.
- Music by: Jaime Fabregas
- Production company: Viva Films
- Distributed by: Viva Films
- Release date: December 25, 1992
- Running time: 92 minutes
- Country: Philippines
- Language: Filipino

Andres Manambit: Angkan ng Matatapang (lit. Andres Manambit: Clan of the Valiant) is a 1992 Philippine biographical action film by Ike Jarlego Jr. on his directorial debut. The film stars Eddie Garcia in the title role. The film is based on the life of the late policeman Andres Manambit. It was one of the entries in the 1992 Metro Manila Film Festival, where it won the most number of awards including Best Picture.

The censored version of the film is streaming online on YouTube.

== Cast ==
- Eddie Garcia as Andres Manambit
- Pinky de Leon as Milagros Manambit
- Eddie Gutierrez as Rafael de Jesus
- Subas Herrero as Mr. Gallego
- Kier Legaspi as Danny Manambit
- Joko Diaz as Tony Manambit
- Atong Redillas as Bert Manambit
- Michelle Ann Lope as Vicky Manambit
- Ruth Tuazon as Susan Manambit
- Jaime Garchitorena as Charlie de Jesus
- Ramon Christopher as Tom de Jesus
- Gary Garcia as Ricky de Jesus
- Dick Israel as Lt. Burgos
- Mia Pratts as Sofia
- Michelle Bautista as Letty
- Berting Labra as Potpot
- Vic Varrion as Zacarrias
- Johnny Vicar as Tirona
- Roland Montes as May
- Joey Padilla as Bert's Assassin
- Ray Ventura as Mayor
- Jose Romulo as Chief
- Pocholo Montes as Major

== Awards ==
Year	Awards	Category	Recipient	Result	Ref.
1992	18th Metro Manila Film Festival	Best Picture	Andres Manambit: Angkan ng Matatapang	Won	
1992	18th Metro Manila Film Festival	Best Director	Ike Jarlego Jr.	Won	
1992	18th Metro Manila Film Festival	Best Editing	Ike Jarlego Jr.	Won	
1992	18th Metro Manila Film Festival	Best Sound Recording	Rolly Ruta	Won	
1992	18th Metro Manila Film Festival	Best Story	Humilde "Meek" Roxas	Won	
1993	17th Gawad Urian Award	Best Editing	Ike Jarlego Jr.	Nominated	
