= 3 Mukha ng Pag-ibig =

Filipino romantic anthology film

- Official movie poster
- Directed by: Emmanuel H. Borlaza (I Love You, Moomoo); Leroy Salvador (Ang Silid); Lino Brocka (Katumbas ng Kahapon)
- Written by: Loida Viriña (I Love You, Moomoo); Roy Iglesias (Ang Silid); Jose Javier Reyes (Katumbas ng Kahapon)
- Produced by: William Leary
- Starring: Sharon Cuneta
- Cinematography: Ato Bernardo (I Love You, Moomoo); JR Peterman (Ang Silid); Romy Vitug (Katumbas ng Kahapon)
- Edited by: Ruben Natividad
- Music by: Mon del Rosario
- Production company: Viva Films
- Distributed by: Viva Films
- Release date: February 7, 1989
- Running time: 128 minutes
- Country: Philippines
- Language: Filipino

3 Mukha ng Pag-ibig (lit. '3 Faces of Love') is a 1989 Filipino romantic anthology film starring Sharon Cuneta in all three segments.

== Plot ==
The film is divided into three stories: "I Love You, Moomoo", "Ang Silid" and "Katumbas ng Kahapon".

I Love You, Moomoo

Liza (Sharon) dies during her honeymoon with her husband Ramon (Tonton), but later on returns to earth to help him straighten out his life.

Ang Silid

Mara (Sharon) is an interior decorator who decides to unravel the mystery of the forbidden room.

Katumbas ng Kahapon

Sandra (Sharon) is torn between Olan (Christopher), her husband who is inconsiderate and irresponsible, and Roman (Mat), her former boyfriend who is offering her a much better life with him abroad.

== Cast ==
I Love You, Moomoo

- Sharon Cuneta as Liza
- Tonton Gutierrez as Ramon
- Leroy Salvador as Temyong
- Gina Pareño as Magda
- Marita Zobel as Mrs. Celia Ortiz
- Romeo Rivera as Atty. Ortiz
- Ernie Zarate as University Dean
- Remedios Novales as Lady Professor

Ang Silid

- Sharon Cuneta as Mara
- Rowell Santiago as Louie
- Julio Diaz as Abel
- Charito Solis as Enciang
- Raul Aragon as Lt. Boquirin
- Vicky Suba as Kathy
- Mon Godiz as Lt. Aberin
- Sonny Erang as Enteng
- Jeffrey Padilla Ong as Ren-ren

Katumbas ng Kahapon

- Sharon Cuneta as Sandra
- Christopher de Leon as Olan
- Mat Ranillo III as Roman
- Rosemarie Gil as Sylvia
- Subas Herrero as Vicente
- Suzanne Gonzales as Karen
- Eddie Arenas as Delfin
- Zandro Zamora as Kardo
- Polly Cadsawan as Paeng
- Bernard Atienza as Bernard
- Raymond Hombrebueno as Raymond
- Ernie David as Policeman
