= Binoy Henyo =

2013 Philippine television drama series

- Title card
- Also known as: Wonder Kid
- Genre: Comedy drama
- Developed by: Marlon Miguel
- Written by: Ma. Cristina Velasco; Rona Lean Sales
- Directed by: Albert Langitan
- Creative director: Jun Lana
- Starring: David Remo
- Theme music composer: Von de Guzman; Ogie Alcasid
- Opening theme: "Binoy Henyo" theme
- Ending theme: "Sa Piling Mo" by Kyla
- Country of origin: Philippines
- Original language: Tagalog
- No. of episodes: 45

Production
- Executive producer: Winnie Hollis-Reyes
- Production locations: Quezon City, Philippines
- Cinematography: Audie Espero
- Camera setup: Multiple-camera setup
- Running time: 19–26 minutes
- Production company: GMA Entertainment TV

Original release
- Network: GMA Network
- Release: July 22 – September 20, 2013

Binoy Henyo (transl. Binoy genius / international title: Wonder Kid) is a 2013 Philippine television drama comedy series broadcast by GMA Network. Directed by Albert Langitan, it stars David Remo in the title role. It premiered on July 22, 2013 on the network's Telebabad line up. The series concluded on September 20, 2013, with a total of 45 episodes.

The series is streaming online on YouTube.

== Cast and characters ==
Lead cast

- David Remo as Robin "Binoy" Santos

Supporting cast

- Sheena Halili as Agnes Santos
- Luis Alandy as Francis Sandoval
- Nova Villa as Chato Santos
- Gwen Zamora as Emily Sandoval
- Angel Satsumi as Len-Len de Guzman

Recurring cast

- Lorenzo "Tata" Mara as Alfredo Sandoval
- Rich Asuncion as Josie Cresencio
- Ervic Vijandre as Lito de Guzman
- Lucho Ayala as James Sandoval
- Sharmaine Arnaiz as Celia de Guzman
- Frencheska Farr as Sandy
- Gene Padilla as Domeng
- Zyriel Jestre as Botchok

== Episodes ==
Binoy Henyo episodes
No.	Title	Original release date	Prod. code
1	"Agnes's Biggest Challenge"	July 22, 2013	BH1001
2	"Agnes's Biggest Challenge"	July 23, 2013	BH1001
3	"Agnes's Biggest Challenge"	July 24, 2013	BH1001
4	"Agnes's Biggest Challenge"	July 25, 2013	BH1001
5	"Agnes's Biggest Challenge"	July 26, 2013	BH1001
After being disowned by her father, and later on discovered that her boyfriend, Francis is already married, Agnes is now facing one of the biggest challenges of her life — and that is to raise her son Binoy all by herself.
6	"Bibot"	July 29, 2013	BH1002
7	"Bibot"	July 30, 2013	BH1002
8	"Bibot"	July 31, 2013	BH1002
9	"Bibot"	August 1, 2013	BH1002
10	"Bibot"	August 2, 2013	BH1002
Binoy receives an old and discarded robot as a gift from his mother Agnes. Using his creativity and imagination, Binoy will repair it and calls his robot "Bibot" or short for Binoy's robot. Bibot becomes Binoy's newest best friend and it is also his entry in the school's science fair project.
11	"Emily's Hidden Agenda"	August 5, 2013	BH1003
12	"Emily's Hidden Agenda"	August 6, 2013	BH1003
13	"Emily's Hidden Agenda"	August 7, 2013	BH1003
14	"Emily's Hidden Agenda"	August 8, 2013	BH1003
15	"Emily's Hidden Agenda"	August 9, 2013	BH1003
Francis and his wife Emily are devastated upon learning that the latter is not capable of having children and this puts a strain in their relationship. Soon after, Francis discovers that Agnes is still alive, and he tries his best to search for her and their child. He is unaware that Emily already knows the whereabouts of Agnes and she will now do everything to make sure that he and Agnes will never see each other again. She offers Agnes a job abroad so that she and Francis won't get reunited.
16	"The Father and the Son"	August 12, 2013	BH1004
17	"The Father and the Son"	August 13, 2013	BH1004
18	"The Father and the Son"	August 14, 2013	BH1004
19	"The Father and the Son"	August 15, 2013	BH1004
20	"The Father and the Son"	August 16, 2013	BH1004
Upon meeting Binoy, Francis was immediately enamored by the little boy's charm, unaware that he is really his son. Meantime, upon the manipulation of Emily, Agnes lost her job in the store where she worked and urged her to go abroad to give Binoy a better future. Emily is doing this to make sure Agnes won't meet her husband, Francis, who's the real dad of Binoy. When Binoy learned of his mother's plan to work abroad, he cried and tells her "he doesn't want her to leave". To help his mom augment their family income, Binoy joins the "Kid Galing, Kid Henyo".
21	"A Life Changing Encounter"	August 19, 2013	BH1005
22	"A Life Changing Encounter"	August 20, 2013	BH1005
23	"A Life Changing Encounter"	August 21, 2013	BH1005
24	"A Life Changing Encounter"	August 22, 2013	BH1005
25	"A Life Changing Encounter"	August 23, 2013	BH1005
Agnes decided not to pursue her dreams of working abroad as Binoy shows up at the airport. Also on the said event, Francis finally learns that Binoy is really his son. With Francis' presence, Agnes knows things will never be the same again. Lola Chato has advised her to talk to her son and tells him the truth that his father is actually alive — and that is his "Tito idol superhero" (Francis). Lenlen, on the other hand, envies Binoy for being so lucky to have a loving and supportive mother like Agnes, and wishes to meet her long-lost mother. Her wish somehow comes true when Celia (played by Sharmaine Arnaiz) arrives.
26	"Complications Arise"	August 26, 2013	BH1006
27	"Complications Arise"	August 27, 2013	BH1006
28	"Complications Arise"	August 28, 2013	BH1006
29	"Complications Arise"	August 29, 2013	BH1006
30	"Complications Arise"	August 30, 2013	BH1006
Francis tells Agnes that he wants another chance at raising Binoy, which they eventually agree upon. In the meantime, Emily will stop at nothing until she takes Agnes out of the picture.
31	"An Evil Scheme"	September 2, 2013	BH1007
32	"An Evil Scheme"	September 3, 2013	BH1007
33	"An Evil Scheme"	September 4, 2013	BH1007
34	"An Evil Scheme"	September 5, 2013	BH1007
35	"An Evil Scheme"	September 6, 2013	BH1007
Lenlen's older brother Lito gets hospitalized because of acute appendicitis. Problematic with the hospital expenses (and no one to run to), Celia accepts Emily's offer — and that is to betray Agnes. Celia asks Agnes to deliver a package. She eventually arrested by the police because the package turns out to filled with marijuana.
36	"False Accusation"	September 9, 2013	BH1008
37	"False Accusation"	September 10, 2013	BH1008
38	"False Accusation"	September 11, 2013	BH1008
39	"False Accusation"	September 12, 2013	BH1008
40	"False Accusation"	September 13, 2013	BH1008
Agnes is finally acquitted of all charges brought against her and immediately released from jail after Celia's revelation of the truth that everything was planned by Emily. Upon her release, Agnes rushes to Francis' house to fetch her son, Binoy, and—upon seeing each other—are both very happy.
41	"All's Well That Ends Well"	September 16, 2013	BH1009
42	"All's Well That Ends Well"	September 17, 2013	BH1009
43	"All's Well That Ends Well"	September 18, 2013	BH1009
44	"All's Well That Ends Well"	September 19, 2013	BH1009
45	"All's Well That Ends Well"	September 20, 2013	BH1009
Francis and Emily's relationship continues to tremble when the former finds out that Emily is indeed the mastermind of all the bad things that is happening to Agnes (he saw a video [recorded by Bibot] that is a concrete evidence of his wife's dastardly deeds). The couple's confrontation ends up with Francis asking Emily for an annulment. Agnes and Binoy are happily reunited, but Emily is so mad and she cannot take this sitting down. She tries to kill Agnes but Francis and Binoy rescued and saved her. Emily got arrested and imprisoned. But their nightmares are far from over when Binoy is diagnosed with a brain tumor. He undergoes brain surgery and upon his recovery, the warring characters forgive each other and reconciled. Agnes decided to go back to school, while Francis—realizes he still loves her—asks Agnes to marry him.

== Ratings ==
According to AGB Nielsen Philippines' Mega Manila household television ratings, the pilot episode of Binoy Henyo earned a 14% rating. The final episode scored an 18.3% rating.

== Accolades ==
Accolades received by Binoy Henyo
Year	Award	Category	Recipient	Result	Ref.
2014	28th PMPC Star Awards for Television	Best Child Performer	David Remo	Nominated	
