= Subas Herrero =

Filipino actor, comedian and singer (1943-2013)

- Born: Ricardo Wright Herrero; April 3, 1943; City of Greater Manila, Philippine Commonwealth
- Died: March 14, 2013 (aged 69); Rochester, New York, U.S.
- Years active: 1959–2010 (sporadically from 2000)
- Spouse: Maripaz Herrero
- Children: 5

Ricardo Wright Herrero (April 3, 1943 – March 14, 2013), better known by his stage name Subas Herrero, was a Filipino actor, comedian and singer.

== Early life ==
Subas Herrero was born on April 3, 1943 as Ricardo Wright Herrero in the City of Greater Manila (now Manila). Herrero attended the Ateneo de Manila University from grade school to college, with his best friend Noel Trinidad as his batchmate throughout his time in Ateneo.

== Career ==
Among Herrero's earliest work in theatre was as a member of Father James B. Reuter's stage crew from Ateneo de Manila, touring the Philippines in 1959 alongside actresses Zenaida Amador, Baby Barredo and Lupita Aquino.

Herrero is best known for Champoy (1980–85), a Philippine gag show where he formed a Laurel and Hardy-like tandem with fellow Ateneo de Manila University alumnus and Filipino actor Noel Trinidad. Aside from television, Herrero also appeared in several films, which include Bakekang (1978), Karapatan ko ang pumatay... Kapitan Guti (1990), and Gao ya xian (1995). He played villain for several action stars like Fernando Poe, Jr., Ramon Revilla, Joseph Estrada and Rudy Fernandez in films and also co-starred in comedy films with Dolphy, Chiquito, Redford White and the trio of Tito, Vic and Joey.

In 1986, Herrero and Trinidad went live on Philippine television to call for the Filipino public to join the crowds at EDSA calling for the ouster of then-Philippine President Ferdinand Marcos. After the revolution, Herrero recorded Handog ng Pilipino sa Mundo (The Gift of the Filipinos to the World) along with 14 other Filipino artists to celebrate the peaceful revolt.

Herrero remained very active in showbusiness until he suffered from a stroke in 2000. Despite his subsequent state of health, he remained sporadically active and even took part in the EDSA Revolution of 2001, this time to call for the ouster of then-Philippine President Joseph Estrada and make a guest appearance in Bubble Gang's tribute to Champoy in 2003. Incidentally, Herrero previously appeared with Estrada in the films Erap Is My Guy (1973) and Diligin mo ng hamog ang uhaw na lupa (1975).

== Personal life ==
Herrero was a practicing Roman Catholic. He was married to his wife Maripaz Herrero and had five children. Herrero moved to the United States in 2010.

== Death ==
Herrero died in Rochester, New York on 14 March 2013 of heart failure caused by double pneumonia. He had used a wheelchair as a result of some mild strokes and other health issues caused by diabetes.

== Filmography ==
=== Film ===
Year	Title	Role	Notes
1971	Pagdating sa Dulo		
1971	Daluyong!		
1972	The Big Bird Cage	Moreno	
1972	Kill the Pushers		
1972	Hatinggabi na Vilma		
1973	Black Mama, White Mama	Luis	credited as Ricardo Herrero
1973	Panic		
1973	Impossible Dream	Don Enrico	
1973	Erap Is My Guy		
1973	Ang Mahiwagang Daigdig ni Pedro Penduko		
1973	Super Gee		
1974	Dragon Fire		
1974	Bamboo Gods and Iron Men		credited as Zubas Herrero
1974	Xia nan yang	American's advisor	
1974	Fe, Esperanza, Caridad	Demon	segment "Caridad"
1974	Savage Sisters	Victor	credited as Subhas Herrero
1974	Black Mamba	Pathologist	
1975	Ang Nobya Kong Sexy		
1975	Supercock	Seeno Nono	
1975	Diligin Mo ng Hamog ang Uhaw Na Lupa		
1976	Beloy & the Kid		
1976	Blind Rage	Chief Rodriguez	
1976	Sinta! Ang Bituing Bagong Gising		
1976	Taho-ichi		
1977	Too Hot to Handle	Octavio Calderone	
1978	Bakekang		
1979	Disgrasyada	Don Miguel	
1979	Mahal... Ginagabi ka na naman	Mr. Solomon	
1979	Mamang Sorbetero		
1979	Diborsyada		
1981	Pakawalan Mo Ako	Don Nilo	
1981	Burgis	College president	
1981	Pabling		
1981	Enter the Ninja	Alberto	
1981	Sambahain ang Ngalan Mo	Padre Simon	
1981	D'Gradweyts		
1981	Ambrocio Defontorum		
1981	Indio		
1982	T-Bird at Ako	Father	
1982	Dancing Master 2: Macao Connection		
1985	I Have Three Hands	Don Severino	
1985	Commando Leopard	Homoza	Released as Kommando Leopard credited as Subas Herrera
1985	Ano ang Kulay ng Mukha ng Diyos?	Mr. Perez	
1986	Send in the Clowns		
1986	Cordillera	Mendez	
1987	Forward March	Major Santiago	
1987	Maging Akin Ka Lamang	Don Alvino Brigo	
1987	My Bugoy Goes to Congress		
1988	Ibulong Mo sa Diyos		
1988	Haw Haw de Karabaw	Don Victor	
1988	Nakausap Ko ang Birhen	Don Ricardo	
1988	Penoy... Balut		
1988	Sa Puso Ko Hahalik ang Mundo		
1988	Sandakot Na Bala	Rico	
1988	Gawa Na ang Bala Na Papatay sa Iyo	Don Rico Montefalcon	
1988	Pik Pak Boom	Don Enriquez	segment "Banana Q"
1989	Si Baleleng at ang Gintong Sirena	Don Jose	
1989	3 Mukha ng Pag-ibig	Vicente	segment "Katumbas ng Kahapon"
1989	Pahiram ng Isang Umaga	Mr. Lorenzo - Client	
1989	Sa Kuko ng Agila	Jose Morelos	
1989	Abot Hanggang Sukdulan	Congressman Pol Barredo	
1989	Babayaran Mo ng Dugo	Don Enrique	
1989	Galit sa Mundo		
1989	Isang Bala, Isang Buhay	Mr. Abad	
1989	Walang Sinasanto ang Bala Ko		
1990	Sa Diyos Lang Ako Susuko	Governor Santarina	
1990	Kapag Wala Nang Batas		
1990	Kahit Konting Pagtingin	Don Dionisio Zaragoza	
1990	"Ako ang Batas" -Gen. Tomas Karingal	Judge San Agustin	
1990	Island of Fire	Police officer	Uncredited
1990	Delta Force 2: The Colombian Connection	President Alcazar	
1990	Apo: Kingpin ng Maynila		
1990	Karapatan Ko ang Pumatay! Kapitan Guti		Marketed as Karapatan Ko ang Pumatay... Kung Kailangan
1990	Iisa-Isahin Ko Kayo!		
1990	Lumaban Ka, Sagot Kita	Don Carlo Montenegro	
1990	Hukom .45	Congressman Pablo	
1990	Angel Molave	Don Roman	
1990	Anak ni Baby Ama	Johnny Roa	
1990	May Isang Tsuper ng Taxi		
1990	Irampa si Mediavillo (The Final Chapter)	Don Luis	
1990	Kalawang sa Bakal	Don Raphael Ocampo	
1991	Madonna ...Babaeng Ahas		
1991	Lt. Palagawad: Mag-uunahan ang Paa Mo sa Patak ng Hukay!		
1991	Kung Patatawarin Ka ng Bala Ko!	Don Julian	
1991	Para sa Iyo ang Huling Bala Ko	Don Basilio	
1991	Hindi Palulupig	Andres Gallego	
1991	Boyong Mañalac: Hoodlum Terminator	Orosa	
1991	Anak ng Cabron: Ikalawang Ugat	Julio's true father	
1991	Mabuting Kaibigan, Masamang Kaaway	Atty. Agustin	
1991	Hepe: ...Isasabay Kita sa Paglubog ng Araw	Mayor Maravilla	
1991	Buburahin Kita sa Mundo	Hepe Alberto Torre (NBI Director)	
1991	Darna	Dr. Redoblado	
1991	Shake, Rattle & Roll III	Mr. Redoblado	segment "Ate"
1991	Ang Totoong Buhay ni Pacita M.	Lawyer of Mrs. Estrella	
1992	Pangako sa 'Yo		
1992	Yakapin Mo Akong Muli	Don Simeon	
1992	Jesus dela Cruz at ang Mga Batang Riles	Don Rosendo	
1992	Miss Na Miss Kita (Utol Kong Hoodlum II)		
1992	Big Boy Bato: Kilabot ng Kankaloo	Don Pio	
1992	Alyas Pogi 2	Don Felipe	
1992	Shotgun Banjo	Atty. Davao	
1992	Andres Manambit: Angkan ng Matatapang	Gallego	
1993	Tikboy Tikas at Mga Khroaks Boys	Sergio	
1993	Kakambal Ko sa Tapang	Militon	Hong Kong title: Zhi fa wei long
1993	Isang Bala Ka Lang... Part-II	The Congressman	
1993	Lt. Col. Alejandro Yanquling, WPD	Senor Remino De Ocampo	
1993	Taong Gubat		
1993	Mama's Boys: Mga Praning-ning	Dean Monyo	
1993	Dalawa Laban sa Mundo: Ang Siga at ang Beauty	Gladys's father	
1993	Ms. Dolora X, Ipagtatanggol Kita		
1993	Di Na Natuto (Sorry Na, Puede Ba?)	Don Ramon	
1994	Hataw Tatay Hataw		
1994	Kapantay Ay Langit	Mr. Yuson	
1994	Relaks Ka Lang, Sagot Kita	Don Romino	
1994	Alyas Boy Ama: Tirador	Lt. Guzman (Ex Policeman)	
1994	Cuadro de Jack		
1994	Pedrito Masangkay: Walang Bakas Na Iniiwan	Jose Ventura	Marketed as Pedrito Masangkay: Walang Bakas Na Iiwan
1994	High Voltage		Hong Kong title: Ah sau ging gat: Si gou aat sin Philippine title: Kapwa Kumakasa
1995	Demolisyon: Dayuhan sa Sariling Bayan		
1995	Kahit Butas ng Karayom, Papasukin Ko		
1995	Ipaglaban Mo: The Movie	Alan's lawyer	segment "Rape: Case No. 538832"
1995	Ultimate Revenge		Hong Kong title: Lei ting xing dong Philippine title: Walang Inuurungan ang Batas
1995	Run Barbi Run	Atty. Ramon Lazaro	
1995	Indecent Professor	Eusebio Holmes	
1995	Hataw Na!	Fr. de los Reyes	
1995	Batas Ko ang Katapat Mo	Congressman	
1995	Bunso: Isinilang Kang-Palaban!	Governor Guevarra	
1996	Ama, Ina, Anak	Fernando Alvarez	
1996	Cedie	Mr. Hobbs	
1996	Bilang Na ang Araw Mo	Don Esteban	
1996	Ang TV Movie: The Adarna Adventure	Lolo Minyong	
1996	Kung Marunong Kang Magdasal, Umpisahan Mo Na	Financier	
1996	Ano Ba Talaga, Kuya?	Señor Balas Y Subas	
1996	Yue gui zhi lang		
1996	Milyonaryong Mini	Mang Minggoy	
1996	Tapatan ng Tapang	Mr. Oscar Perez	
1997	Wow... Multo	Saint Peter	
1997	Home Along da Riles 2	Don Primo	
1997	Wanted Perfect Murder	Rod Rosales	
1997	Amanos, Patas ang Laban		
1997	Puerto Princesa		
1997	Buenavista: Kapag Dumanak ang Dugo	Governor Madero	
1998	Pagbabalik ng Probinsyano	Emilio Torralba	
1998	Sgt. Hidalgo: Bala ng Katarungan	Mayor	
1998	José Rizal	Lt. Enrique de Alcocer	
1999	Ang Kabit ni Mrs. Montero	Dr. Yuseco	
1999	Maldita	Don Enrique	
1999	Unfaithful Wife 2: Sana'y Huwag Akong Maligaw	Manny Alegre	
2000	Noriega: God's Favorite	Gabriel Arias	TV movie; final film role

=== Television ===
Year	Title	Role
1974–1976	Baltic and Co.	Don
1980–1985	Champoy	Himself
1991–1993	Executive Champoy	Himself
1993	Noli Me Tángere	Padre Damaso
1993–1995	Star Smile Factory	Host
2003	Bubble Gang	Himself/Guest role
