= Inay (1993 film) =

1993 Filipino film

- Directed by: Artemio Marquez
- Written by: Ricardo Lee
- Produced by: Mimilanie M. Dee
- Starring: Nora Aunor; Tirso Cruz III; Maridin Lumano
- Cinematography: Jun Rasca
- Edited by: Abelardo Hulleza
- Music by: Ringgo Marquez
- Production company: Omni Films International
- Distributed by: Omni Films International
- Release date: December 25, 1993
- Running time: 100 minutes
- Country: Philippines
- Languages: Filipino; English

Inay is a 1993 Filipino drama film directed by Artemio Marquez. The film stars Nora Aunor in the title role, along with Tirso Cruz III and Maridin Lumano. It was one of the entries in the 1993 Metro Manila Film Festival. This is the first film produced by couple Derek Dee, who is first introduced in this film, and Melanie Marquez under their film company Omni Films International.

The film is streaming online on YouTube.

== Cast ==
- Nora Aunor as Sally
- Tirso Cruz III as Teddy
- Melanie Marquez as Gemma
- Chanda Romero as Prosecutor Attorney
- Tommy Abuel as Defense Attorney
- Jaclyn Jose as Anna
- Derek Dee as Angel Castro
- Maridin Lumano as Thea
- Carol Dauden as Catalina
- Orestes Ojeda as Donny
- Tita Muñoz as Mrs. Corcuera
- Caridad Sanchez as Aling Elena
- Louella de Cordova as Doctor de Cordova
- Nanding Fernandez as The Judge
- Tom Lupton as Leonardo
- Ces Aldaba as Policeman
- Renato Laurel as Policeman
- Jason Calma as Jason
- Ramir Lorenzo as Ramir
- Noel Allan as Publication Editor

== Awards ==
| Year | Awards | Category | Recipient | Result | Ref. |
|---|---|---|---|---|---|
| 1993 | 19th Metro Manila Film Festival | Best Picture | Inay | Nominated | |
| 1993 | 19th Metro Manila Film Festival | Best Actress | Nora Aunor | Nominated | |
| 1994 | 40th FAMAS Awards | Best Child Performer | Maridin Lumano | Nominated | |
| 1994 | 5th YCC Awards | Best Film | Artemio Marquez | Nominated | |
| 1994 | 5th YCC Awards | Best Performance | Nora Aunor | Won | |
