= Nikka Valencia =

Filipino actress (born 1976)

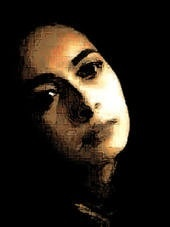
- Born: Sharon Rosenfeld; July 28, 1976 (age 49); Makati, Metro Manila, Philippines
- Occupations: Actress, dancer
- Years active: 1992—present

Sharon Rosenfeld (born July 28, 1976, in Makati, Metro Manila, Philippines), better known by her screen name Nikka Valencia, is a Filipino film, television and theater actress.

== Early life ==
Valencia was born to a Filipino mother from Mindanao and a father from Haifa, Israel. She is of patrilineal Jewish descent.

== Career ==
Valencia first joined the television pageant "She Girl" in 1992 via the GMA noontime show Lunch Date. She subsequently won the contest. In 1993, she officially had her showbiz debut via ABS-CBN's Ang TV. That same year, she played the sister of Aga Muhlach's character in May Minamahal.

In 1995, Valencia became one of the original hosts of the noontime musical variety program ASAP. She appeared in films such as Pare Ko with Mark Anthony Fernandez, Jomari Yllana and Claudine Barretto, Mangarap Ka with Claudine Barretto, Mark Anthony Fernandez, Kier Legaspi and Gio Alvarez, both in 1995, and in Radio Romance starring Gelli de Belen, Jolina Magdangal and Rico Yan in 1996.

In 2012, Valencia portrayed Lorena Alvarez in Precious Hearts Romances Presents: Pintada.

== Filmography ==
=== Television ===
Year	Title	Role	Notes	Source
1993–1997	Ang TV	Herself / Various roles		
1994	Maalaala Mo Kaya		Episode: "Pilat"	
1995–2001	ASAP	Herself — Host / Performer		
1995	T.G.I.S.	Kaye		
1995	Maalaala Mo Kaya		Episode: "Medalyang Ginto"	
1996	Maalaala Mo Kaya		Episode: "Putik"	
1996	Maalaala Mo Kaya		Episode: "Bahay na Bato"	
1996	Maalaala Mo Kaya		Episode: "Baul"	
1996	Maalaala Mo Kaya		Episode: "Dibuho"	
1996–1997	Mara Clara (Book 2)	Mariel		
1999	Maalaala Mo Kaya		Episode: "Kundiman"	
2000–2002	Pangako Sa 'Yo	Julieta Macaspac		
2001	Maalaala Mo Kaya	Andy's wife	Episode: "Sapatos"	
2001	Maalaala Mo Kaya		Episode: "Basket"	
2005	Maalaala Mo Kaya		Episode: "Casa"	
2006	Maalaala Mo Kaya		Episode: "Chinese Garter"	
2007	Maalaala Mo Kaya	Lolet	Episode: "Maong"	
2008	Maalaala Mo Kaya	Neneng	Episode: "Isda"	
2008	Maalaala Mo Kaya	Lorna	Episode: "Lupa"	
2009	Maalaala Mo Kaya	Chen's mother	Credited as "Nika Valencia"; Episode: "Bisikleta"	
2010	Maalaala Mo Kaya	Agnes	Episode: "Bracelet"	
2011	Maalaala Mo Kaya	Rowena	Episode: "Pasaporte"	
2011	Maalaala Mo Kaya	Irene	Episode: "Stroller"	
2012	Maalaala Mo Kaya	Tiyang	Episode: "Shorts"	
2012	Precious Hearts Romances Presents: Pintada	Lorena Alvarez		
2012	Isang Dakot Na Luha	Edna		
2012	Third Eye	Teacher	Episode: "Diablo sa School"	
2015	Bridges of Love	Tiyang Des		
2017	Pusong Ligaw	Clarissa Dimaawa	Special participation	
2018	Precious Hearts Romances Presents: Araw Gabi	April		

=== Film ===
Year	Title	Role	Notes	Source
1993	May Minamahal	Mandy		
1995	Pare Ko	Carol		
1995	Mangarap Ka	Marie		
1996	Radio Romance	Lizbeth		
1996	Ang TV: The Movie: The Adarna Adventure	Lulu		
1998	Ikaw Pa Rin Ang Iibigin	Candy		
2000	Live Show	Liza		
2019	The Annulment			
