= Noel Trinidad =

Filipino actor and comedian

- Born: 1940 or 1941 (age 84–85)
- Occupations: Actor; comedian; singer
- Years active: 1955–present
- Notable work: Champoy (1980)
- Spouse: Lally Laurel
- Children: 1
- Parents: Koko Trinidad (father); Lina Flor (mother)

Noel Flores Trinidad (born 1940 or 1941) is a Filipino television, film, and theater actor, comedian and singer.

== Early life and education ==
Noel Trinidad was born in the early 1940s to Francisco "Koko" Trinidad and Lina Flor, both of whom were regarded as pioneers of the Philippines radio industry. Flor is known for writing the radio drama series Gulong ng Palad.

Trinidad attended the Ateneo de Manila University from grade school to college, with his best friend Subas Herrero as his batchmate throughout his time in Ateneo.

== Career ==
Trinidad started his acting career on radio. He read lines for radio before a live audience which he used to improve upon his facial expressions.

His first film appearance was for a work of Lamberto Avellana which revolved around the Hukbalahap Rebellion. Trinidad portrayed the son of the protagonist. He also joined Avellana's Barangay Theater Guild as a teenager in the 1950s, and later the Repertory Philippines upon its formation in the 1960s. In the 1950s, Trinidad was given the role of a young José Rizal in the one-act play Her Son, Jose Rizal, directed by Avellana and written by Leonor Orosa Goquingco.

Trinidad was best known for being part of a comedy duo with Subas Herrero, especially in the 1980 television series Champoy, which aired on Radio Philippines Network (RPN). The two are childhood friends who often acted in plays as part of a glee club in school. Their first professional act together was in the 1976 film Sinta! Ang Bituing Bagong Gising. He also acted in the 1982 film Batch '81.

On February 24, 1986, at the height of the People Power Revolution, Trinidad joined Herrero, Johnny Manahan, June Keithley and others in the reopening of the Maharlika Broadcasting System television station as the People's Television Network (PTV). On that afternoon, Trinidad and Herrero led the staging of an impromptu show outside the station building with other entertainers and waved the Philippine flag.

In 1994, Trinidad was cast in a lead role opposite Lou Veloso in film critic Emmanuel A. Reyes' comedy film Suwapings.

He starred in the film Family Matters, which premiered at the 2022 Metro Manila Film Festival. Trinidad was remarked that the film could be his last due to his hearing issues by this time.

== Personal life ==
Noel Trinidad is married to Milagros "Lally" Laurel, who served as the representative from Batangas's 3rd district from 1987 to 1998. She is the daughter of former House Speaker Jose Laurel Jr., and granddaughter of former President Jose P. Laurel.

He has a son named Joel, who is also an actor. Trinidad previously worked in an advertising agency.

== Filmography ==
=== Theatre ===
Year	Title	Role	Venue	Ref.
1955	Her Son, Jose Rizal	Young José Rizal		

=== Film ===
Film performances
Year	Title	Role	Notes	Ref(s).
1976	Sinta! Ang Bituing Bagong Gising			
1981	Pabling			
1982	Batch '81	Prof. Santi Santillan		
1987	Once Upon a Time			
1988	Haw Haw de Karabaw			
1988	Alega Gang: Public Enemy No.1 of Cebu	Alega gang member		
1990	Paikot-ikot			
1990	Titser's Enemi No.1			
1990	Bakit Ikaw Pa Rin?			
1990	Too Young			
1991	Barbi for President			
1992	Sam & Miguel (Your Basura, No Problema)	Ben Gilagid		
1992	Nang Gabing Mamulat si Eba (Jennifer Segovia Story)			
1992	Iisa Pa Lamang			
1992	Bakit Labis Kitang Mahal	Arturo		
1993	Kumusta Ka, Aking Mahal?			
1993	Paniwalaan Mo			
1993	Pulis Patola			
1994	Suwapings	Luis Macario		
1994	Binibini ng Aking Panaginip			
1994	Bala at Lipistik	Congressman Tengco		
1994	Da Young Asiong Aksaya			
1994	Swindler's List			
1994	Greggy en' Boogie: Sakyan Mo Na Lang, Anna			
1995	Baby Love	Henry Laperal		
1995	Run Barbi Run	Maj. Velarde		
1996	Radio Romance	Bong Cordero		
1996	Milyonaryong Mini			
1996	Cedie	Mr. Jefferson		
1996	Nag-iisang Ikaw	Noel Alejo		
1996	Nasaan Ka Nang Kailangan Kita?			
1997	Computer Kombat			
1997	Laging Naroon Ka			
1997	Isang Tanong, Isang Sagot			
1997	Wanted Perfect Murder			
1998	My Guardian Debil	Mr. Dom		
1998	Gangland	Chua		
2000	Ex-Con	Lim Ket Sung		
2002	Got 2 Believe	Judge Villacosta		
2006	The Hunt for Eagle One: Crash Point	Robert Gomez		
2008	Dayo: Sa Mundo ng Elementalia	Lolo Miong		
2010	Miss You like Crazy	Ulysses		
2013	Tuhog	Carding Dacanay		
2015	You're My Boss	Lolo		
2017	Ang Larawan	Don Miguel		
2017	Paki			
2020	Magikland	Lakay Baldo		
2020	Suarez: The Healing Priest	Bishop		
2022	Family Matters	Francisco		
2024	Senior Moments			

=== Television ===
Television performances
Year	Title	Role	Notes
1980–1985	Champoy		
1988	A Dangerous Life	Jimmy Ongpin	Miniseries
1991	Abangan ang Susunod Na Kabanata	Fernando Tengco	
1993	Milagro		Television film
1994	Private Affairs	Himself (guest host)	
1996	1896		
1997	Home Along Da Riles	Resort manager	
2005	Maging Akin Muli	Priest	Television film
2006–2007	John en Shirley	Rene Ramirez	
2010	Pepito Manaloto	Attorney	Guest role
2011	100 Days to Heaven	Tagabantay/Saint Peter	
2012–2013	Be Careful with My Heart	Roberto Lim	Recurring
2025	Incognito	Tomas' neighbor	
