= Jose Javier Reyes =

Filipino writer and director for film and television (born 1954)

Joey Javier Reyes
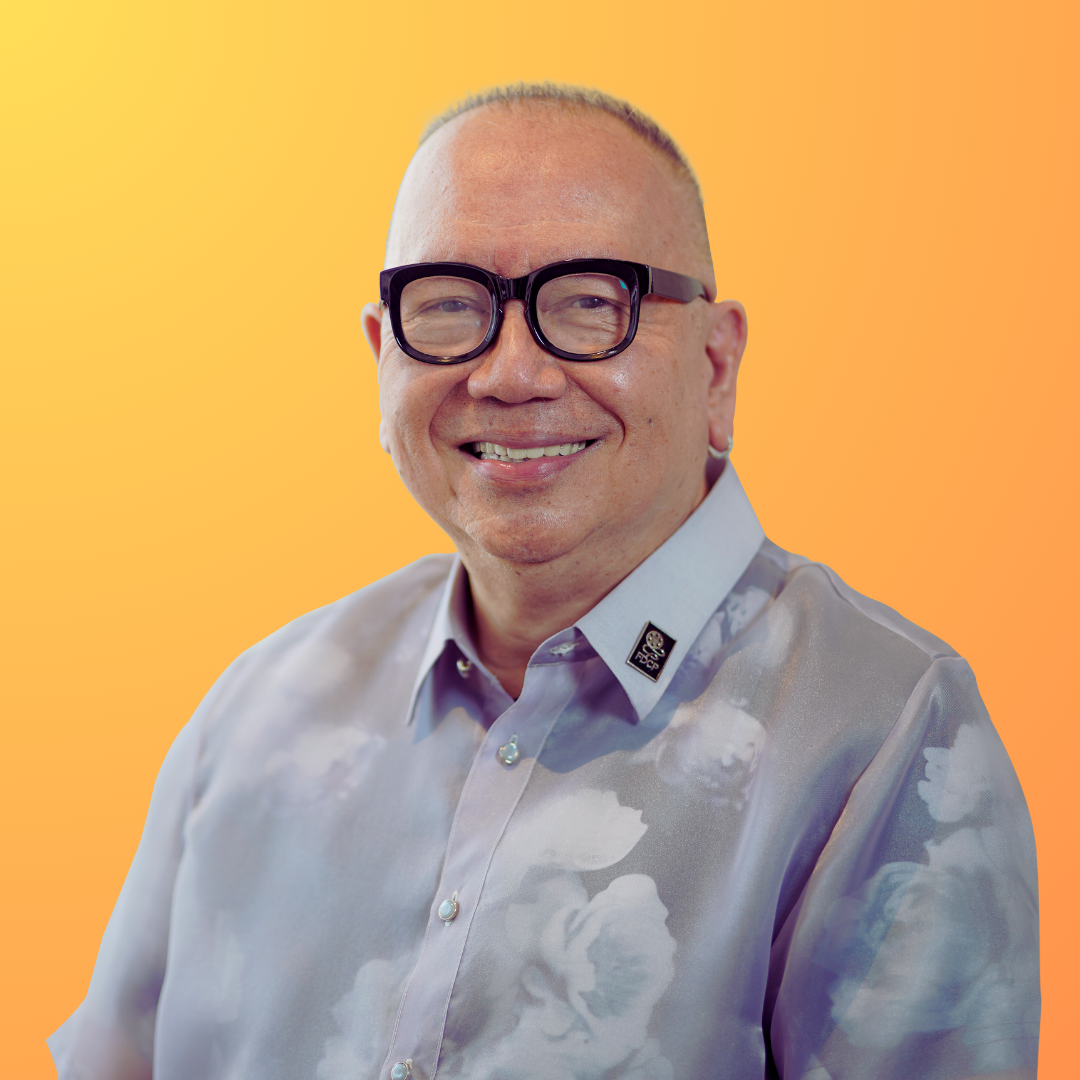

Chairperson of the Film Development Council of the Philippines
- Incumbent
- Assumed office April 8, 2024
- President: Bongbong Marcos
- Preceded by: Tirso Cruz III

Personal details
- Born: Jose Maria Socorro Javier Reyes; October 21, 1954 (age 72) Philippines
- Occupation: Director, writer, screenwriter, professor
- Known for: Film and television writing and direction, essayist, professor, TV host

Jose "Joey" Javier Reyes (born October 21, 1954) is a Filipino director, screenwriter, lyricist, and actor. He has won awards from the Gawad Urian, Metro Manila Film Festival and PMPC Star Awards for Movies for his work on films such as Pahiram ng Isang Umaga, Batang PX, and Kasal, Kasali, Kasalo.

Reyes currently serves as the chairperson of the Film Development Council of the Philippines.

== Education ==
Reyes graduated from De La Salle University in Manila, Philippines from the College of Liberal Arts. During his stay as an undergraduate he was already a director and writer for the university's theatre guild Harlequin Theatre Guild. Reyes also finished his master's degree in English Education from the De La Salle University Graduate School and has taken courses leading to his Ph.D. in Comparative Literature at the University of Santo Tomas. He was the recipient of a Doctoral Enrichment Program grant through the Fulbright-Hayes Foundation where he took doctoral courses in Comparative Literature and Folklore Studies at Indiana University, Bloomington.

== Career ==
He also serves as a Senior Professional Lecturer at the Department of Communication, De la Salle University. He served as Chairman of the AB Film Program at the Design Arts Campus at the De La Salle–College of Saint Benilde from 2019 to 2025.

He was also the Head of Competition and Monitoring Committee of the Cinemalaya Independent Film Festival. He also sits as the Head of the Student Short Film Competition of the MetroManila Film Festival while sitting as part of its Education Panel. there teaching under the Communication Department and holding classes for the Communication Arts majors of the university.

His first writing for a major film was Oro, Plata, Mata in 1982, which is being streamed on Netflix.

He wrote the libretto of the musical Katy, based on the life and times of Philippine Jazz Queen, Katy de la Cruz. He penned the original song, "Minsan ang Minahal ay Ako" for the musical with music composed by National Artist, Ryan Cayabyab. He also wrote the hit song, "Iisa Pa Lamang" sung by Joey Albert with music by Danny Tan. He also wrote the lyrics of the Christmas song, "Kumukutikutitap" with music also by Cayabyab.

On April 11, 2024, Reyes took his oath as the new chairman of the Film Development Council of the Philippines (FDCP), succeeding Tirso Cruz III who resigned in early March.

== Personal life ==
He is the uncle of Mark A. Reyes.

== Filmography ==
=== Films ===
==== As director ====
Year	Title	Production	Notes
1989	Regal Shocker: The Movie	Regal Entertainment	Also screenwriter
1991	Emma Salazar Case	Good Harvest Unlimited	
1992	Iisa Pa Lamang	Regal Entertainment	
1992	Ikaw ang Lahat sa Akin	Regal Entertainment	
1992	Bakit Labis Kitang Mahal	Octoarts Films	Also screenwriter
1993	May Minamahal	Star Cinema	Also screenwriter
1993	Hindi Kita Malilimutan	Regal Entertainment	
1994	Shake, Rattle & Roll V	Regal Entertainment	"Anino" segment Also screenwriter for all segments
1995	Pare Ko	Star Cinema	Also screenwriter
1995	Hataw Na!	Star Cinema	Also screenwriter
1996	Maruja	Viva Films	Also screenwriter
1996	Radio Romance	Star Cinema	
1996	Ama, Ina, Anak	Star Cinema	
1996	Bayarang Puso	Regal Films	
1996	Nag-iisang Ikaw	Neo Films	Also screenwriter
1997	Batang PX	Star Cinema	Also screenwriter
1997	Nang Iniwan Mo Ako	Available Light; Viva Films	Also screenwriter
1998	Nagbibinata	Available Light; Star Cinema	Also screenwriter
1998	Hiling	Star Cinema	Also screenwriter
1999	Bakit Pa?	GMA Films; OctoArts Films	
1999	Luksong Tinik	Regal Entertainment	Also screenwriter
2000	Live Show	Regal Entertainment	Also screenwriter
2000	Sugatang Puso	Available Light; Regal Films	Also screenwriter
2001	Narinig Mo Na Ba ang L8est?	Star Cinema	Also screenwriter
2002	9 Mornings	Star Cinema	Also screenwriter
2003	Anghel sa Lupa	Regal Entertainment	Also screenwriter
2003	Pinay Pie	Star Cinema	Also screenwriter
2003	Kung Ako na Lang Sana	Star Cinema	Also screenwriter
2003	Malikmata	OctoArts Films; Canary Films	
2004	Spirit of the Glass	OctoArts Films; Canary Films	Also screenwriter
2005	Can This Be Love	Star Cinema	Also screenwriter
2005	Kutob	Canary Films	Also screenwriter
2006	Kasal, Kasali, Kasalo	Star Cinema	Also screenwriter
2006	Matakot Ka sa Karma	OctoArts Films; Canary Films	Also screenwriter
2007	Katas ng Saudi	Maverick Films	Also screenwriter
2007	Sakal, Sakali, Saklolo	Star Cinema	Also screenwriter
2008	When Love Begins	Star Cinema	Also screenwriter
2008	My Monster Mom	Regal Entertainment; GMA Films	Also screenwriter
2008	Magkaibigan	Maverick Films	Also screenwriter
2008	One Night Only	OctoArts Films; Canary Films	Also screenwriter
2009	Status: Single	Viva Films; On-Q 28 Productions	Also screenwriter
2010	Till My Heartaches End	Star Cinema	Also screenwriter
2010	Working Girls	GMA Films	Also screenwriter
2011	Wedding Tayo, Wedding Hindi	Star Cinema	Also screenwriter
2011	My House Husband: Ikaw Na!	OctoArts Films	Also screenwriter
2012	Mga Mumunting Lihim	OctoArts Films; LargaVista Entertainment	Also screenwriter
2013	Ano ang Kulay ng mga Nakalimutang Pangarap?	Film Development Council of the Philippines; Sineng Pambansa; LargaVista Entertainment	Also screenwriter
2014	Somebody to Love	Regal Entertainment	Also screenwriter
2014	Dilim	Regal Entertainment	Also screenwriter
2015	No Boyfriend Since Birth	Regal Entertainment	
2015	My Bebe Love: #KiligPaMore	GMA Films; APT Entertainment; OctoArts Films; M-Zet Productions; MEDA Productions	Also screenwriter
2017	Our Mighty Yaya	Regal Entertainment	Also screenwriter
2017	Spirit of the Glass 2: The Haunted	OctoArts Films; T-Rex Entertainment	Also screenwriter
2018	Walwal	Regal Entertainment; LargaVista Entertainment	
2018	Recipe for Love	Regal Entertainment	
2019	Time & Again	Regal Entertainment; LargaVista Entertainment	Also screenwriter
2022	Secrets	Viva Films; LargaVista Entertainment	Also screenwriter
2023	Tag-init	Viva Films; LargaVista Entertainment	Also screenwriter
2023	Patikim-Tikim	Viva Films; LargaVista Entertainment	
2024	Karinyo Brutal	Viva Films; LargaVista Entertainment	Also screenwriter
2024	Bantay-Bahay	Regal Entertainment	
2024	Girl Online	Regal Entertainment	
2025	Cheat Day	Regal Entertainment	

==== As screenwriter only ====
Year	Name	Production	Notes
1980	Problem Child	Regal Films	First screenplay
1981	Caught in the Act	Regal Films	
1981	Boystown	Regal Films	
1982	Oro, Plata, Mata	Experimental Cinema of the Philippines	
1984	Hotshots	Viva Films	
1984	Condemned	Golden Dragons Films; NV Productions; APG Films	
1985	I Have Three Hands	Regal Films; M-Zet Films; APT Entertainment	
1986	Inday Inday sa Balitaw	Regal Films	
1987	Kung Aagawin Mo ang Lahat sa Akin	Viva Films	
1988	Wake Up Little Susie	Regal Films	
1988	Hiwaga sa Balete Drive	Seiko Films	"Ang Babae sa Balete Drive" segment
1988	Super Inday and the Golden Bibe	Regal Film	
1988	One Day, Isang Araw	Regal Film	Story credit
1988	I Love You 3x a Day		
1989	3 Mukha ng Pag-ibig	"Katumbas ng Kahapon" segment	
1989	Abot Hanggang Sukdulan		
1990	Kasalanan Bang Sambahin Ka?		
1991	John en Marsha Ngayon '91	RVQ Productions	
1995	Sana Maulit Muli	Star Cinema	Story credit
2004	Now That I Have You	Star Cinema	
2013	Four Sisters and a Wedding	Star Cinema	Screenplay used as basis

==== As actor ====
Year	Title	Role	Production	Notes
1982	Oro, Plata, Mata	Chinese Cook	Experimental Cinema of the Philippines	Cameo
1990	Shake, Rattle & Roll 2	Morgue attendant	Regal Films	"Kulam" segment
1991	Shake, Rattle & Roll III	Principal	Regal Films	"Ate" segment
2012	Boy Pick-Up: The Movie		GMA Pictures; Regal Entertainment	Cameo
2019	Ang Babae sa Septic Tank 3: The Untold Story of Josephine Bracken	Himself	iWant; Dreamscape Digital	miniseries; portrays a supporting fictional character of himself

=== Television ===
==== Writer ====
Year	Name	Television Network	Cast	Note(s)
1987–1998	Palibhasa Lalake	ABS-CBN	Joey Marquez, Richard Gomez, John Estrada, Gloria Romero, Cynthia Patag, Carmina Villarroel, Amy Perez	
1991	Maalaala Mo Kaya: Hapdi sa Puso	ABS-CBN	Archie Adamos, Metring David, Paquito Diaz, Jaclyn Jose, Anita Linda, Ed Instrella	Aired on June 5, 1991.
1991–1997	Abangan ang Susunod Na Kabanata	ABS-CBN	Nova Villa, Carmi Martin, Roderick Paulate, Tessie Tomas, Noel Trinidad, Sammy Lagmay, Jennifer Sevilla, Carmina Villarroel, Anjo Yllana, Joji Isla, Nena Perez Rubio	
1993–1994	We R' Family	ABC-5	Liza Lorena, Alice Dixson, Gabby Concepcion, Luz Valdez, Sammy Lagmay, Berting Labra	
1995	GMA Telesine Presents: Halik sa Hangin	GMA Network	Cristina Gonzales, Jao Mapa, Luigi Alvarez, Harvey Gomez Romeo Rivera, Tia Pusit	He also served as director of the television film. Aired on June 25, 1995.
2013–2014	Madam Chairman	TV5	Sharon Cuneta, Jay Manalo, Byron Ortile	Head writer
2023	Lovers & Liars	GMA Network	Claudine Barretto, Shaira Diaz, Yasser Marta, Christian Vasquez, Lianne Valentin, Kimson Tan, Polo Ravales, Michelle Vito, Rob Gomez, Sarah Edwards	Head writer

==== Director ====
Year	Name	Television Network	Cast	Note(s)
1993	Maalaala Mo Kaya: Bulaklak	ABS-CBN	Roderick Paulate, Eagle Riggs, Al Tantay, Lucita Soriano	Aired on August 25, 1993

== Awards ==
=== Metro Manila Film Festival ===
Year	Category	Work	Result
1993	Best Director	May Minamahal	Won
1993	Best Story	May Minamahal	Won
1993	Best Screenplay	May Minamahal	Won
2005	Best Director	Kutob	Won
2006	Best Director	Kasal, Kasali, Kasalo	Won
2006	Best Original Story	Kasal, Kasali, Kasalo	Won
2006	Best Screenplay	Kasal, Kasali, Kasalo	Won
2007	Best Screenplay	Katas ng Saudi	Won
2008	Best Original Story	One Night Only	Won
2015	Best Director	My Bebe Love	Nominated
2015	Best Screenplay	My Bebe Love	Nominated
