= Bella Flores =

Filipina actress (1929–2013)

- Flores in 2008
- Born: Remedios Papa Dancel; February 27, 1929; Santa Cruz, Manila, Philippine Islands
- Died: May 19, 2013 (aged 84); Quezon City, Philippines
- Resting place: Our Lady of Eternal Peace Memorial Park, San Jose del Monte, Bulacan
- Occupation: Actress
- Years active: 1950–2013
- Children: Ruby Dancel-Arcilla
- Parent(s): Matias Dancel (father); Emilia Papa (mother)
- Relatives: Jesse Arcilla (son-in-law); Jessica Dancel-Arcilla (granddaughter)
- Awards: FAMAS Best Supporting Actress; 1967 Ang Kaibigan Kong Santo Niño

Remedios Papa Dancel (February 27, 1929 – May 19, 2013), commonly known as Bella Flores, was a Filipino actress whose career spanned over six decades. Known primarily for her villainess roles in film and television, she has received eight FAMAS Award for Best Supporting Actress nominations, winning one for Kaibigan Ko'ng Sto. Niño (1967). She was awarded with the Lifetime Achievement Award by the Luna Awards in 1989 for her contributions to Philippine cinema.

Flores is widely known as the "Queen of Kontrabidas" and "Primera Kontrabida" in the history of Philippine movies.

== Life and career ==
Flores was born Remedios Papa Dancel in Manila to Matias Dancel, a slipper maker, and Emilia Papa, both from San Antonio, Nueva Ecija. She finished her primary education at Cecilio Apostol Elementary School, and secondary education at Roosevelt College. She was a college sophomore at the Far Eastern University when she appeared in her first film, Tatlong Balaraw (1950), at age 21.

Flores was signed by Sampaguita Pictures. She was cast in Roberta as the cruel stepmother of Tessie Agana's titular character, despite being 22 years old. The film was a box-office success, credited with saving Sampaguita Pictures from bankruptcy after a fire had destroyed its studio. The film's success also elevated Flores into the upper tier of stars, and typecast her in villainous roles. The film critic Nestor Torre remarked that Flores had "been making life miserable for many generations of hapless stars—all the way back to little Tessie Agana and Boy Alano in Roberta in the early 1950s, to her fresh batch of victims in the New Millennium... doing it without skipping a beat—and without aging (much) to boot." She received the 1967 FAMAS Best Supporting Actress award for her role in Ang Kaibigan Kong Santo Niño and bella mora.

== Filmography ==
=== Film ===
Year	Title	Role(s)
1951	Roberta	Bar girl
1953	Diwani	Ramona
1978	Mahal Mo, Mahal Ko	Bella
1978	Atsay	Mrs. Aguila
1980	Kastilyong Buhangin	Viring
1980	Under-Age	Berta
1980	Waikiki: Sa Lupa ng Ating Mga Pangarap	Bella
1982	Diary of Cristina Gaston	Bella
1983	To Mama with Love	Store owner
1983	Tulume Alyas Zorro	Doña Sabel
1984	Anak ni Waray vs. Anak ni Biday	Carol
1984	Missing in Action	Madame Pearl
1985	Sanay	Doña Beatriz
1985	Tinik sa Dibdib	Kikay
1986	Batang Quiapo	Mila
1988	Nakausap Ko ang Birhen	Sister Rafaelita
1988	Buy One, Take One	Zarah
1989	Pulis, Pulis sa Ilalim ng Tulay	Belle
1989	Sgt. Niñonuevo: The Fastest Gun Alive of WPD	Nana Toyang
1990	Petrang Kabayo 2: Anong Ganda Mo? Mukha Kang Kabayo!	Monina
1990	Paikot-ikot	Dorothy
1990	Patigasan ang Labanan	Bella
1990	May Isang Tsuper ng Taxi	Aling Maring
1992	Shake, Rattle & Roll IV	Mama Monang
1993	Dugo ng Panday	Bantay
1994	The Secrets of Sarah Jane: Sana'y Mapatawad Mo!	Recruiter
1996	Ang Misis Kong Hoodlum	Widow #1
1996	Ikaw ang Mahal Ko	Felipa
1997	Nakawin Mo ang Aking Puso	Mameng
1998	Tataynic	Colonel's wife
1998	Ginto't Pilak	Landlady
2000	'Di Ko Kayang Tanggapin	Bella
2005	D' Anothers	Precious
2011	Way Back Home	Lola Nita
2012	My Kontrabida Girl	Herself

=== Television ===
Year	Title	Role(s)
1997	Esperanza	Mrs. Sanidad
2000–2001	Marinella	Doña Guadalupe "Guada" Villareal
2005	Spirits	Milagros
2005–2006	Mga Anghel na Walang Langit	Gaudencia "Gude" Redondo-Hawkins
2010	Sine Novela: Mars Ravelo's Trudis Liit	Doña Hershey Ferrer

== Death ==
Flores died on May 19, 2013, in Quezon City General Hospital. Her death was a result of complications from a recent hip surgery.

== Legacy ==
=== Bella Flores Foundation ===
The family of the late veteran actress Bella Flores plans to establish a foundation in her name and to organize a fundraising concert to benefit show business personalities with Alzheimer’s disease.

This was announced Tuesday night by singer Imelda Papin, Flores' niece. Flores was diagnosed with early stages of Alzheimer's and diabetes months before she died on May 19. The concert is tentatively set for July at the Aliw Theater in Pasay, Papin said.

Flores' daughter Ruby Arcilla said during the wake on Tuesday, "If mom's death could pave the way for… these projects, she would be very happy. She always tried to do what she could for her colleagues."

Arcilla said that a woman approached her during the wake to say thanks. "The lady said she showed mom her doctor’s prescription and mom gave what she could afford. I hope other actors would do the same – give from their hearts."

== In popular culture ==
- Former teen star Valerie Concepcion plays the role of the late veteran actress Bella Flores in a drama anthology of her feature story of Bella's lifetime in Star Confessions aired on TV5 (now The 5 Network) in 2011.
- GMA 7 Comedian John Feir plays as "Belly Flori" a parody version of the late veteran actress Bella Flores in a defunct comedy Gag Show "Nuts Entertainment" on GMA 7 in 2003.
