= Simple Lang =

Studio album by Ariel Rivera
- Released: 1993 (Philippines)
- Recorded: 1991–1992
- Genre: OPM
- Label: Musiko Records, BMG Records (Pilipinas) Inc.

Ariel Rivera chronology
Ariel Rivera (1991)	Simple Lang (1993)	Photograph (1995)

Simple Lang is the second album by Ariel Rivera. It was quickly released after his successful self-titled debut album. The album sold platinum.

== Track listing ==
1. "Simple Lang" (Vehnee Saturno)
2. "Pinilit Kong Limutin Ka" (Butch Bautista, Doris Estallo)
3. "Sana'y Nandoon Ka" (Nonoy Tan)
4. "Without Your Love" (Freddie Saturno, Tito Cayamanda)
5. "Pag-ibig Kong Totoo" (Ryan Cayabyab)
6. "Wala Kang Katulad" (Cayabyab)
7. "Minsan Lang Kitang Iibigin" (Aaron Paul del Rosario)
8. "Laging Ikaw" (Vehnee Saturno)
9. "Ito Na Kaya" (Lisa Diy)
10. "Don't Give Me Your Promises" (Alvina Eileen Sy)
