= Ariel Rivera (album) =

Studio album by Ariel Rivera
- Released: 1991 (Philippines)
- Recorded: 1990–1991
- Studio: Greenhills Sound, Trax Recording, Ad & Ad Recording Studios
- Genre: OPM
- Label: Musiko Records, BMG Records (Pilipinas) Inc.
- Producer: Vehnee Saturno (tracks 1–4 and 6–10), Benjie Carreon (track 5), Bodjie Dasig and Odette Quesada (co-producers; track 9)

Ariel Rivera chronology
Ariel Rivera (1991)	Simple Lang (1992)

Professional ratings
Review scores
Source	Rating
AllMusic	2/5 stars

Ariel Rivera is the self-titled debut album by Philippine singer Ariel Rivera. Released in 1991, it took two years of recording for it to finally be finished.

== Track listing ==
No.	Title	Writer(s)	Length
1.	"Sana Kahit Minsan"	Vehnee Saturno
2.	"Kahit Sandali"	Tito Cayamanda
3.	"Ako'y Maghihintay"	Jade Nicdao
4.	"This Crazy Game"	Cayamanda
5.	"Mahal na Mahal Kita"	Benjie Carreon
6.	"Sa Aking Puso"	Saturno
7.	"Come Back to Me"	Music : E. Ramazzotti, P. Cassano. Lyrics: Dorries A. Saturno
8.	"Pagmamahal"	Aaron Paul del Rosario
9.	"Ayoko Na Sana"	Odette Quesada, Bodjie Dasig
10.	"I'm So in Love"	Music : E. Ramazzotti, P. Cassano. Lyrics: Dorries A. Saturno
