= KZRM =

Radio station in Chama, New Mexico, United States (1999–2016)

- Chama, New Mexico; United States
- Frequency: 96.1 MHz

Programming
- Format: Defunct, was country music and Northern New Mexico Music

Ownership
- Owner: Chama Broadcasting Corp.

History
- First air date: October 8, 1999
- Last air date: April 29, 2016
- Former call signs: KYJY (1999–2000); KFLH (2000–2004)

Technical information
- Licensing authority: FCC
- Facility ID: 84276
- Class: C3
- ERP: 25,000 watts
- HAAT: 92 meters (302 ft)
- Transmitter coordinates: 36°53′56″N 106°36′6″W

Links
- Public license information: Public file; LMS

KZRM (96.1 FM) was a radio station broadcasting a country music and Northern New Mexico music music format. Licensed to Chama, New Mexico, United States. The station was owned by Chama Broadcasting Corp.

KZRM went on the air October 8, 1999. The station went silent on April 29, 2016; its license was cancelled on September 28, 2017.

The 96.1 frequency returned to the air under a new license in early 2022 using the call letters KXJR.
