= Sharmaine Arnaiz =

Filipino actress

- Born: Sharmila Velasco Prihibas Shahani; November 1, 1974 (age 52); Davao City, Philippines
- Other name: Sharmaine
- Occupation: Actress
- Years active: 1986–present
- Known for: Oranges

Sharmaine Arnaiz (born Sharmila Velasco Pribhdas Shahani; November 1, 1974) is a Filipino actress.

== Biography ==
She was born Sharmila Velasco Pribhdas-Shahani to an Indian father and a Filipina mother of Hiligaynon ancestry (from Roxas City, Capiz). She has a younger sister Bunny Paras who is also an actress and they are first cousins to Patrick Garcia and Cheska Garcia through their respective mothers.

And an alumna of De La Salle Araneta University's DVM Batch 2007.

== Filmography ==
=== Film ===
Year	Title	Role	References
1989	Estudyante Blues	Joey	
1990	Teacher's Enemy No. 1	Charm	
1990	Rocky & Rolly: Suntok Sabay Takbo	Annie	
1990	Espandang Patpat	Adela	
1991	Kung Tayo'y Magkakalayo		
1992	Totoy Buang: Mad Killer ng Maynila	Charmaine	
1992	Aguila at Guerrero	Josie	
1992	Vengador		
1992	Sonny Boy: Public Enemy of Cebu City		
1992	Sgt. Lando Liwanag: Batas ng Api	Rhodora	
1992	The Marcos Manalang Story		
1992	Anak ng Tondo 2	Soria	
1992	Ako Ang Katarungan		
1993	Johnny Tinoso and The Proud Beauty	Selina	
1993	Wherever You Are	Cita	
1993	Pandoy: Alalay ng Panday	Cristina	
1993	Doring Borobo	Ali	
1993	Tony Bagyo	Emy	
1993	Lumuhod ka sa Lupa	Sabel	
1993	Col. Alejandro Yanquiling	Mitch	
1993	Berdugo ng Munti	Rosie	
1994	Comfort Women	Angelita	
1994	Separada	Sandy	
1994	Swindler's List		
1994	Koronang itim	Eva Cristobal	
1994	Hindi pa tapos ang Labada, Darling	Lovely Rivera	
1994	God, Save the Babies	Lisa	
1995	Matimbang pa sa Dugo	Ellen	
1995	Emergency Call	Kathy	
1996	Anak, Pagsubok Lamang	Kathryn	
1996	Radio Romance	Babsy Fernandez	
1996	Hagedorn	Elena Marcelo	
1996	Isa, Dalawa, Takbo	Agi	
1997	Ang Pulubi at ang Princesa	Malunggay	
1997	Milagros	Lagring	
1997	Calvento Files: The Movie	Minda	
1998	Sagad sa init		
1999	Suspek	Zeny Braga	
2000	Soal Hati	Tania	
2002	Alamat ng Lawin		
2014	Kamandag ni Venus	Venus	
2014	Separados		
2016	Whistleblower		
2016	Mrs.		

=== Television ===
Year	Title	Role
1993	Lt. Col. Alejandro Yanquiling, WPD	Journalist
1995	Matimbang pa sa Dugo	Ellen
1986–1996	That's Entertainment	Friday Group Member
1996	Maalaala Mo Kaya: Valentine Card	Irene
1999–2001	Saan Ka Man Naroroon	Marietta
2002–2003	Kung Mawawala Ka	Amanda Montemayor
2002–2004	Berks	Javie's stepmother
2003	Maalaala Mo Kaya: Upuan	Pia
2003	Narito ang Puso Ko	Young Dolores
2003–2004	Walang Hanggan	Various
2011	Munting Heredera	Maritess / Nanay Lulu
2012	My Beloved	Perla Quijano
2012	Kasalanan Bang Ibigin Ka?	Beatrice "Bea" Montelibano
2012–2013	Magdalena: Anghel sa Putikan	Charito "Chato" Natividad / Amparo Reyes
2013	Binoy Henyo	Celia
2014–2015	Two Wives	Natividad "Tita Vida" Arguello-Soler
2014	Maalaala Mo Kaya: Pedicab	Teta
2014	The Singing Bee	Herself
2015	Maalaala Mo Kaya: Stuffed Toy	Edna Joven
2015	Home Sweetie Home	uncredited
2015	Karelasyon: Kambal	Digna
2016	Ipaglaban Mo: Lason	Linda
2016	Once Again	Violeta Soriano
2016	Karelasyon: Engkanto	Digna
2016	Maalaala Mo Kaya: Paru-paro	Emma
2017	Ipaglaban Mo: Laro	Rhodora
2017	Ipaglaban Mo: Pikon	Susan
2018	Daig Kayo Ng Lola Ko: Giselle, palayain mo si Rapunzel!	Monica
2018	Sherlock Jr.	Lorraine Pelaez
2018	Tadhana: Torture	Anouk
2019	Hanggang sa Dulo ng Buhay Ko	Valentina "Tina" De Jesus Cardeñas
2021	Ang Dalawang Ikaw	Belen
2023	Voltes V: Legacy	Luisa Gordon
2023	Love Before Sunrise	Aurora
2024	Maka	Glenda Ilagan
