= Bakit Labis Kitang Mahal =

1992 romantic drama film by Jose Javier Reyes

- Directed by: Jose Javier Reyes
- Written by: Jose Javier Reyes
- Produced by: Orlando R. Ilacad; Simon C. Ongpin
- Starring: Lea Salonga; Aga Muhlach; Ariel Rivera
- Cinematography: Jun Pereira
- Edited by: George Jarlego
- Music by: Dionisio Buencamino
- Production company: OctoArts Films
- Distributed by: OctoArts Films
- Release date: December 25, 1992
- Country: Philippines
- Language: Filipino

Bakit Labis Kitang Mahal (English: Why Do I Love You So Much?) is a 1992 Filipino romantic drama film written and directed by Jose Javier Reyes. Starring Lea Salonga, Aga Muhlach, and Ariel Rivera, the film revolves around a love triangle of a young woman, her fiancé, and his friend. It also features a supporting cast including Barbara Perez, Noel Trinidad, Sandy Andolong, and Mary Walter, with Chin-Chin Gutierrez in her introductory role.

Produced and distributed by OctoArts Films, the film was theatrically released on December 25, 1992, as one of the entries for the 18th Metro Manila Film Festival. It became a box-office success and received accolades from award-giving organizations.

== Plot ==
Sandy returns to the Philippines from the United States to see her family and fiancé, David. David's friend, Tommy Carbonel, who is unhappy with his relationship with his girlfriend, Cynthia, resigns from his job in the hotel lobby. David introduces Sandy to Tommy before leaving to help plan the upcoming wedding. After David departs, romance ensues between Sandy and Tommy.

== Cast ==
=== Main cast ===
- Lea Salonga as Sandy
- Aga Muhlach as Tomas "Tommy" Carbonel
- Ariel Rivera as David

=== Supporting cast ===
- Sandy Andolong as Marita
- Bimbo Bautista as Benjie
- Manny Castañeda as Didoy
- Eric Cayetano as Ronnie
- Chin-Chin Gutierrez (Note: She was credited as Mariajose "Michelle" Arnaldo.) as Cynthia, Tommy's girlfriend whom they have an unhappy relationship.
- Barbara Perez as Cita
- Noel Trinidad as Arturo
- Mary Walter as Lola Guelay

== Reception ==
=== Box office ===
By June 16, 1993, the film had grossed more than ₱30 million at the box office from cinemas in Metro Manila.

=== Accolades ===
Accolades received by Bakit Labis Kitang Mahal
Year	Award	Category	Recipient(s)	Result	Ref.
1992	Metro Manila Film Festival	Best Picture	Bakit Labis Kitang Mahal	Nominated	
1992	Metro Manila Film Festival	Best Actor	Aga Muhlach	Won	
1992	Metro Manila Film Festival	Best Actress	Lea Salonga	Nominated	
1992	Metro Manila Film Festival	Best Supporting Actor	Ariel Rivera	Won	
1992	Metro Manila Film Festival	Best Supporting Actress	Sandy Andolong	Nominated	
1992	Metro Manila Film Festival	Best Cinematography	Jun Pereira	Nominated	
1992	Metro Manila Film Festival	Best Musical Score	Dionisio "Nonong" Buencamino	Won	
1992	Metro Manila Film Festival	Best Original Theme Song	Bakit Labis Kitang Mahal by Alex Malilin	Won	
1992	Metro Manila Film Festival	Best Sound Recording	Rolly Ruta	Nominated	
1992	Metro Manila Film Festival	Best Original Story	Jose Javier Reyes	Nominated	
1992	Metro Manila Film Festival	Gatpuno Antonio J. Villegas Cultural Awards	Bakit Labis Kitang Mahal	Nominated	
