= Lina Flor =

Filipino writer

Carolina Flores-Trinidad or Lina Flor (October 6, 1914 – February 11, 1976) was a writer from the Philippines. Writer of the hit radio drama Gulong ng Palad, she was also a "society columnist, bilingual fictionist, scriptwriter, biographer and lyricist, as well as a cartoonist, an actress, even a journalism teacher."

== Career ==
At a young age, Flor embarked on her career as a radio performer for KZIB, a small radio station, where she hosted a morning program. Later, she moved to KZRM, the largest radio station at the time, which was predominantly run by American executives and talents.

During her successful tenure as a radio talent, Flor ventured into a new role as an editor for a radio column in the Graphic. Subsequently, she became a regular columnist for the publication after the resignation of Radio Manila's publicity girl, who happened to be American.

Around this period, Flor also began writing short stories in English, with her first story, titled "Big Sister," published in 1934. Her works, including "Family Album" and "Grandmother Muses," were recognized in Jose Garcia Villa's annual Honor Roll.

With the Japanese occupation and the onset of the Second World War, the focus of writing shifted from English to Tagalog to foster a stronger sense of nationalism in the country. For many writers, the act of writing became a means to take a specific political stance. She was also the first to write the first-ever commercial jingles in the Tagalog language for the sponsors of KZRM at that time.

Flor embraced writing in Tagalog and showcased her prowess as a writer and performer. She contributed several short stories to publications such as Sinag-tala, Ilang-Ilang, Magasin ng Pagsilang, and Daigdig. Additionally, she wrote serialized novels for Sinag-tala and Taliba, authored regular columns for Sinag-tala, and a movie column for Ilang-Ilang.

In 1949, Flor's radio soap opera, "Gulong ng Palad," aired on DZRH and significantly impacted radio programming. It went on to become one of the most popular daytime series in radio history.

Throughout her career, Flor delved into various media roles, including feature writing with a focus on famous personalities, autobiographical essays on the challenges of being a wife and mother, film jury membership, social history exploration, and cultural criticism.

== Later life ==
In her final years, despite facing persistent health challenges, Flor remained committed to refining her craft. In 1972, she published Sparklers for the Day, a book containing day-to-day listings of events like birthdays, weddings, and anniversaries of prominent Filipinos. Letty Jimenez Magsanoc, a young journalist at that time, remarked that "Sparklers" had an intimate and personal feel, akin to peering into someone else's datebook.

The subsequent year saw Flor delving into poetry with the release of Dilettante, a collection of light verses and four cartoons. While Flor referred to the collection as a product of "dabbling," some critics regarded Dilettante as her masterpiece.

On February 11, 1976, Lina Flor died from a heart attack.
