= Ariel Rivera =

Filipino singer-songwriter and actor (born 1966)

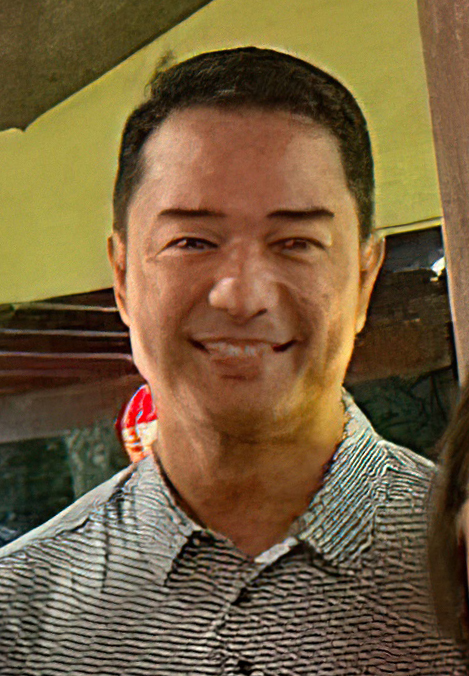
- Rivera in 2023

Background information
- Born: Jose Ariel Jimenez Rivera; September 1, 1966 (age 60)
- Origin: Manila, Philippines
- Genres: OPM; pop; R&B
- Occupations: Singer; songwriter; actor
- Instrument: Vocals
- Years active: 1989–present
- Labels: Sony-BMG; Musiko

Jose Ariel Jimenez Rivera (Tagalog: [ʔaɾˈjɛl ɾiˈbɛɾa]; born September 1, 1966), is a Filipino singer, songwriter and actor.

Rivera was born in Manila, Philippines but has since migrated with his family to Canada. He has since become a successful singer-songwriter, and actor. He is dubbed as "Kilabot ng Kolehiyala", a title formerly bestowed upon Hajji Alejandro, a popular Filipino singer in the 1970s.

== Career ==
=== Music career ===
Rivera was a graduate of architecture in Canada and he was also an undergraduate of Psychology before his singing talent was accidentally discovered by Vehnee Saturno while he was on holiday in the Philippines singing at a cousin's wedding. In 1989, Musiko Records & BMG Records (Pilipinas) Inc. (now known as Sony Music Philippines) signed Rivera to their label. His self-titled debut album was released after two years. The first single, "Sana Kahit Minsan" was a No. 1 pop-r&b crossover hit. The album went 3× platinum. In 1992, he quickly released his second album, Simple Lang. This album also went 3× platinum.

In 1994, Rivera began recording new material for his next album, Photograph. Photograph was released in 1995. His album reached Gold status in the Philippines. Due to his acting commitments, he wasn't able to release albums as frequently as he did before, but in 2008, he released Once Again, which continued nine original songs and covers of "Kung Ako na Lang Sana" and Michael Bolton's "Go the Distance".

=== Acting career ===
In 1992, Rivera tried acting. His first starring role in the film Bakit Labis Kitang Mahal earned him a Best Supporting Actor award in the 1992 Metro Manila Film Festival. He landed a lead role opposite Sharon Cuneta in 1993's "Ikaw". He also co-starred in Isang Sulok Ng Mga Pangarap (1994); Anghel Na Walang Langit (1995); Minsan May Pangarap: The Guce Family Story (1995); May Nagmamahal Sa'yo (1996), Ikaw Pala Ang Mahal Ko (1997) and Bata, bata ... Pa'no Ka Ginawa? (1998). In 1999, he played the title character of Rama in the staging of Rama at Sita – The Musical by SK Entertainment at the University Theatre. For most of the 2000s, he acted in GMA teleseryes.

== Personal life ==
Rivera has two older siblings (Leo and Gemma), and two younger siblings (Orven and Marvin).

He married actress Gelli de Belen, on December 22, 1997, in Santuario de San José, and both did a film released five months before their marriage entitled "Ikaw Pala Ang Mahal Ko". The couple has two sons: Joaquín Andrés (born January 29, 1999) and Julio Alessandro (born November 6, 2000).

== Discography ==
- Ariel Rivera (1991)
- Simple Lang (1993)
- Paskong Walang Katulad (1993)
  - Paskong Walang Katulad (2009)
- Photograph (1995)
- Getting to Know (1997)
- Aawitin Ko Na Lang (1999)
- In My Life (2003)
- Platinum Hits (2003)
- Once Again (2008)

== Filmography ==
=== Film ===
Year	Title	Role
1992	Bakit Labis Kitang Mahal	David
1995	Minsan May Pangarap: The Guce Family Story	Aldo Guce
1995	Jessica Alfaro Story	
1996	May Nagmamahal Sa'yo	Nestor
1997	Ikaw Pala ang Mahal Ko	Tonyboy Balmaceda
1998	Bata, Bata… Pa'no Ka Ginawa?	Raffy de Lara
2009	Padre de Pamilya	Joselito Mirasol
2014	Shake, Rattle & Roll XV	Alberto
2015	Everyday I Love You	Dr. Rex "Anthony" Madrigal
2017	Love You to the Stars and Back	Mika's father
2019	Ang Sikerto ng Piso	Ronnie
2019	Damaso	
2021	Love Is Color Blind	Fidel

=== Television ===
Year	Title	Role
1989–1995	Sa Linggo nAPO Sila	Main host / performer
1990–1992	Manilyn! Live	Main host / performer
1995–2003, 2011–present	ASAP	Main host / performer
1998–1999	Mula sa Puso	Rafael Buencamino
1999–2001	Saan Ka Man Naroroon	Angelo Cabrera (antagonist)
2003	Narito ang Puso Ko	Amoroso San Victores
2004	Magpakailanman: The Willy Garte Story	Willy Garte
2004–2005	Forever in My Heart	Michael Bernabe
2005	Ang Mahiwagang Baul	
2005–2006	Sugo	Samuel
2006	Now and Forever: Duyan	Mateo
2006–2007	Atlantika	Barracud (antagonist)
2007	Fantastic Man	Danny / Tadtad (antagonist)
2007–2008	Carlo J. Caparas' Kamandag	Abdon Serrano (antagonist)
2008—2009	Luna Mystika	Simon / Ybarra
2009	Rosalinda	Alfredo Del Castillo
2010	Sine Novela: Ina, Kasusuklaman Ba Kita?	Daniel Bustamante
2010–2011	Inday Wanda	Daddy Lee
2011	Mula sa Puso	Don Fernando Pereira
2011	Maalaala Mo Kaya: Tap Dancing Shoes	Luciano Mata
2011	Ikaw ay Pag-Ibig	Arnel
2012	Precious Hearts Romances Presents: Lumayo Ka Man Sa Akin	Maurice Del Castillo
2012	E-Boy	Gabriel Villareal
2012	Maalaala Mo Kaya: Flash Cards	Fidel
2012–2013	Ina, Kapatid, Anak	Julio Marasigan
2013	Maalaala Mo Kaya: Saranggola	Eddy
2013–2014	Maria Mercedes	Santiago Del Olmo
2014	Maalaala Mo Kaya: Marriage Contract	Leo Bautista
2014–2015	Bagito	Gilbert Medina
2015	Maalaala Mo Kaya: Sapatos	Roel
2015–2016	Doble Kara	Ishmael Suarez
2016	Born for You	Mike Sebastian
2016–2017	Hahamakin ang Lahat	Nelson Solano / Alfred Benitez
2017	Mulawin vs. Ravena	Panabon
2017	Sunday PinaSaya	Himself/guest performer
2019	Maalaala Mo Kaya: Jersey	Abner
2019	Ipaglaban Mo: Caregiver	Mario Garcia
2019–2020	Sandugo	PC/MSgt. Eugene Reyes
2020	A Soldier's Heart	Gen. Victor Mondejar
2020	Maalaala Mo Kaya: Drawing	Rey
2020	Lunch Out Loud	Himself / Judge of Kantrabaho
2021	Unloving U	Henry Acosta
2022	The Fake Life	Onats Villamor†
2023	Can't Buy Me Love	Raul
2024–25	Shining Inheritance	Tony Villarazon
2025–26	FPJ's Batang Quiapo	PLtCol. Orlando Gonzales (antagonist)

== Awards ==
- Best New Male Artist - Awit Awards, 1991
- Best Performance by a New Male Recording Artist, 1992
- Best Supporting Actor – Bakit Labis Kitang Mahal, Metro Manila Film Festival, 1992
- Music Video of the Year - "Tunay na Ligaya", 1997
- Best Vocal Performance of the Year by a Duet/Group - "I Don't Love You Anymore" with Lea Salonga, 1999
- Outstanding Lead Actor - Forever in My Heart, 2nd Golden Screen Awards, 2005
- Best Actor - Parola, Bahaghari Awards
