= Koko Trinidad =

Filipino executive and producer (1915 – 2001)

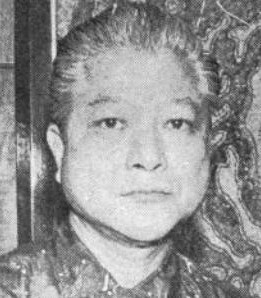
- Trinidad in 1967
- Born: Francisco Dacanay Trinidad; October 10, 1915
- Died: January 21, 2001 (aged 85)
- Other name: Koko
- Spouse: Lina Flor (died 1976)
- Children: 4 (including Noel)

Francisco "Koko" Dacanay Trinidad (October 10, 1915 – January 21, 2001) was a Filipino executive, radio announcer, producer, film actor, and theater director.

== Early life ==
Trinidad was born on October 10, 1915.

== Career ==
After graduating from high school, Trinidad joined the Far Eastern Broadcasting Company working as an announcer and program arranger. He rose ranks to become chief of program arrangers, appointed as a production coordinator, and became a production manager. During World War II, he directed stage presentations at the Avenue, Lyric, and Strand Theaters. From 1945 to 1947 he worked as a producer-announcer for the US Office of War Information and program director for the US Information Service. He was also part of the Barangay Theater Guild.

Trinidad worked for the government at the Philippine Broadcasting Service (PBS) from 1947 until 1970 when he retired as a general manager. He promoted the use of distance learning through the use of radio broadcast. He would work at the University of the Philippines as an instructor from 1970 to 1980 where he taught aspirant broadcasters.

He would become Secretary-General of the UNESCO National Commission of the Philippines from 1986 to 1990, and a program director for the international service of Radio Veritas Asia.

== Death ==
He died on January 21, 2001.

== Personal life ==
Trinidad was married to Lina Flor who was known for writing the radio drama series Gulong ng Palad. They had four children, including actor Noel.
