= 24th Luna Awards =

2006 Philippine film awards ceremony

- Date: September 16, 2006
- Site: PAGCOR Grand Theater, Airport Casino Filipino, Parañaque
- Hosted by: Marvin Agustin; Claudine Barretto; John Lloyd Cruz; Jolina Magdangal; Lani Mercado; Bong Revilla

Highlights
- Best Picture: Blue Moon
- Most awards: Blue Moon; Nasaan Ka Man (4)
- Most nominations: Nasaan Ka Man (10)

Television coverage
- Network: RPN

The 24th Luna Awards were held on September 16, 2006 at PAGCOR Grand Theater and they honored the best Filipino films of the year 2005. This is the last extravagant awards ceremony that was held by the Academy. After this, the Academy started holding simple ceremonies due to lack of government funding.

The nominees were announced on August 11, 2006. Nasaan Ka Man received the most nominations with ten. Blue Moon followed with nine.

Both Blue Moon and Nasaan Ka Man won most of the awards with four awards. The former also received Best Picture. It was delayed telecast on RPN, the last telecast ever of the Luna Awards.

== Winners and nominees ==
Best Picture	Best Direction
Blue Moon; Ang Pagdadalaga ni Maximo Oliveros; Dubai; Nasaan Ka Man; La Visa Loca	Joel Lamangan – Blue Moon; Cholo Laurel – Nasaan Ka Man; Mark Meily – La Visa Loca; Rory Quintos – Dubai; Auraeus Solito – Ang Pagdadalaga ni Maximo Oliveros
Best Actor	Best Actress
Marvin Agustin – Kutob; Ricky Davao – Mga Pusang Gala; Eddie Garcia – Blue Moon; Nathan Lopez – Ang Pagdadalaga ni Maximo Oliveros; Dennis Trillo – Blue Moon	Zsa Zsa Padilla – Mano Po 4: Ako Legal Wife; Irma Adlawan – Mga Pusang Gala; Claudine Barretto – Dubai; Claudine Barretto – Nasaan Ka Man; Boots Anson-Roa – Blue Moon
Best Supporting Actor	Best Supporting Actress
Johnny Delgado – La Visa Loca; Ryan Agoncillo – Kutob; Michael de Mesa – Dubai; BJ Forbes – Ispiritista: Itay, May Moomoo!; Ping Medina – Ang Pagdadalaga ni Maximo Oliveros	Hilda Koronel – Nasaan Ka Man; Irma Adlawan – Nasaan Ka Man; Ana Capri – Kutob; Jean Garcia – Birhen ng Manaoag; Jennylyn Mercado – Blue Moon
Best Screenplay	Best Cinematography
Allan Tijamo – Blue Moon; Ricky Lee & Shaira Salvador – Dubai; Mark Meily – La Visa Loca; Boots Agbayani Pastor – Masahista; Michiko Yamamoto – Ang Pagdadalaga ni Maximo Oliveros	Charlie Peralta – Nasaan Ka Man; Ely Cruz – Enteng Kabisote 2: Okay Ka Fairy Ko...The Legend Continues; Jay Linao & Richard Padernal – Mulawin: The Movie; Rolly Manuel – Mano Po 4: Ako Legal Wife; Lyle Sacris – Exodus: Tales from the Enchanted Kingdom
Best Production Design	Best Editing
Richard Somes – Exodus: Tales from the Enchanted Kingdom; Clint Catalan, Christina Dy & Lily Esquillon – Ang Pagdadalaga ni Maximo Oliveros; Jon Cuyson – Nasaan Ka Man; Joey Luna – Blue Moon; Elfren Vibar – Dubai	Marya Ignacio – Nasaan Ka Man; Vito Cajili – Kutob; Alex Castañeda – Exodus: Tales from the Enchanted Kingdom; Manet Dayrit – Mulawin: The Movie; Marya Ignacio – Mano Po 4: Ako Legal Wife
Best Musical Score	Best Sound
Von de Guzman – Blue Moon; Von de Guzman – Exodus: Tales from the Enchanted Kingdom; Vincent de Jesus – Mano Po 4: Ako Legal Wife; Lutgardo Labad – Mulawin: The Movie; Jesse Lasaten – Nasaan Ka Man	Addiss Tabong – Nasaan Ka Man; Albert Michael Idioma – Kutob; Arnold Reodica – Dubai; Addiss Tabong – D' Anothers; Addiss Tabong – Enteng Kabisote 2: Okay Ka Fairy Ko...The Legend Continues

=== Special awards ===
Fernando Poe, Jr. Lifetime Achievement Award	Posthumous Award
Pablo S. Gomez; Ramon Revilla, Sr.	Nida Blanca; George Canseco

== Multiple nominations and awards ==
Nominations	Film
10	Nasaan Ka Man
9	Blue Moon
7	Dubai
6	Ang Pagdadalaga ni Maximo Oliveros
5	Kutob
4	Mano Po 4: Ako Legal Wife
4	Exodus: Tales from the Enchanted Kingdom
4	La Visa Loca
3	Mulawin: The Movie
2	Enteng Kabisote 2: Okay Ka Fairy Ko...The Legend Continues
2	Mga Pusang Gala

Awards	Film
4	Blue Moon
4	Nasaan Ka Man
