= 2005 Cinemalaya =

1st Cinemalaya Independent Film Festival
- Location: Metro Manila, Philippines
- Film titles: 15
- Festival date: July 12, 2005–July 17, 2005
- Website: Official Website

Cinemalaya chronology
- 2006

The 1st Cinemalaya Independent Film Festival was held from July 12 until 17, 2005 in Metro Manila, Philippines.

== Entries ==
The following films are entries to the New Breed: Full-Length Feature section of Cinemalaya. The winning film is highlighted with boldface and a dagger.

=== Full-Length Features ===
Title	Director	Cast
Baryoke	Ron Bryant	Ronnie Lazaro, Pen Medina, Elizabeth Oropesa, Wenah Nagales
Big Time	Mario Cornejo	Michael de Mesa, Nor Domingo, Winston Elizalde, Joanne Miller
ICU Bed #7	Rica Arevalo	Eddie Garcia, Angel Aquino, Noni Buencamino, Irma Adlawan
Isnats	Michael Angelo Dagñalan	Jourdan Sebastian, Joel Olaño, Teddy Corpuz, Ida Ramos
Lasponggols (Last Take, Last Shot)	Sigfreid Barros Sanchez	Jeffrey Quizon, Buboy Garovillo, Jim Paredes, Dwight Gaston
Ang Pagdadalaga ni Maximo Oliveros	Auraeus Solito	Nathan Lopez, Soliman Cruz, JR Valentin, Neil Ryan Sese
**Pepot Artista** ^{†}	Clodualdo del Mundo Jr.	Elijah Castillo, Noni Buencamino, Rio Locsin, Cris Villanueva
Room Boy	Alfred Aloysius L. Adlawan	Polo Ravales, Meryll Soriano, Chanda Romero, Ynez Veneracion
Sarong Banggi	Emmanuel dela Cruz	Jaclyn Jose, Angelo Ilagan, Pierro Rodriguez, Alchris Galura

=== Short films ===
Title	Director
Alimuom	Rommel Tolentino
Babae	Sigrid Andrea Bernardo
Blood Bank	Pam Miras
Kultado	Lawrence Fajardo
**Mansyon** ^{†}	Joel Ruiz
Panaginipan	Anna Isabelle Matutina

== Awards ==
Full-Length Features

- Best Film: Pepot Artista by Clodualdo del Mundo Jr.
  - Special Jury Prize: Ang Pagdadalaga ni Maximo Oliveros by Auraeus Solito
- Best Direction: Rica Arevalo for ICU Bed #7
- Best Performance of an Actor: Eddie Garcia for ICU Bed #7
  - Special Citation (for acting performance): Nathan Lopez for Ang Pagdadalaga ni Maximo Oliveros
- Best Performance of an Actress: Meryll Soriano for Room Boy
- Best Screenplay: Mario Cornejo and Monster Jimenez for Big Time
- Best Cinematography: Rodolfo Aves Jr. for Baryoke
- Best Sound Design: Allan Feliciano and Raffy Magsaysay for Big Time
- Best Editing: Daniel Adapon for Pepot Artista
- Best Production Design: Lily Esquillon for Ang Pagdadalaga ni Maximo Oliveros

Short Films

- Best Film: Mansyon by Joel Ruiz
  - Special Jury Prize: Kultado by Lawrence Fajardo
- Best Direction: Sigrid Andrea Bernardo for Babae
- Best Screenplay: Pamela Miras for Blood Bank

== Jury ==
Selected for the Jury were:

- Eddie Romero
- Philip Cheah
- Johnny Delgado
- Mark Meily
- Nestor U. Torre
