= College of St. John–Roxas =

Roman Catholic college in Capiz, Philippines

College of St. John-Roxas
- Former names: 1999: University of St. La Salle – Affiliate College; 2002: La Salle Affiliate College
- Type: Private
- Established: 1999
- Religious affiliation: Roman Catholic
- Academic affiliations: De La Salle Brothers; De La Salle University; University of St. La Salle; Our Lady of Mount Carmel Learning Center; Capiz Private Schools Assn
- Students: 1200+
- Location: Gov. Atila Balgos Ave., Banica, Roxas, Capiz, Philippines; 11°34′54″N 122°45′57″E
- Campus: Urban
- Hymn: La Salle Alma Mater
- Colors: Green and white
- Nickname: La Salle Green Knights
- Sporting affiliations: CAPRISAA
- Location in the Visayas Location in the Philippines

College of St. John–Roxas (CSJ-R De La Salle), also known simply as St. John, is a private college run under the supervision of the De La Salle Brothers, and now a member of the Association of Lasallian Affiliated Schools (ALAS) under the De La Salle Philippines located in Roxas City, Philippines. It has been known as University of St. La Salle – Affiliate College and La Salle Affiliate College. In June 2000, the school managed the high school department of Our Lady of Mount Carmel Learning Center (Mount Carmel La Salle).

== History ==
=== Supervised by University of St. La Salle-Bacolod ===
In the late 1990s, there was a growing demand for quality education in Capiz. It has been observed that many graduates in the local high schools go to big cities like Manila, Cebu, Bacolod and Iloilo to pursue a college education. With this, concerned Capizeños in the persons of Mrs. Judy Roxas (mother of Mar Roxas), Atty. Antonio Ortiz, Dr. Abundio Balgos and Engr. Antonio Balgos met Br. Rolando Dizon FSC, then president of the University of St. La Salle in Bacolod City and presented the idea of putting up a La Salle school in Roxas City. University of St. La Salle-Bacolod then supervised Our Lady of Mount Carmel Learning Center (also known as Mount Carmel La Salle), the first La Salle supervised school in Roxas City under Mrs. Norma Tagle of USLS-Bacolod. In June 1999, the University of St. La Salle – Affiliate College (USLS-AC) under the supervision of the University of St. La Salle in Bacolod City opened its doors to the youth of Capiz and the neighboring provinces in Panay Island. The first school building housed ten classrooms, a science lab, a computer lab, a clinic, a prayer room, a library and administrative offices mostly located on the ground floor. The first school head and dean of the college was Dr. Teresita Atotubo, formerly the Dean of the College of Arts and Sciences at USLS- Bacolod. Br. Rolando Dizon FSC became its first President while Mrs. Judy Roxas was chosen as the first chair of the Board of Trustees (BoT). The school initially offered four academic programs: Bachelor of Science in Accountancy, Bachelor of Science in commerce with majors in Management Accounting, Business Management, Management Information Systems and Marketing, Bachelor of Science in psychology, and Bachelor of Science in biology. In that same school year, the school acquired a Multi-cab service car through the donation of De La Salle-College of St. Benilde.

=== Mt. Carmel La Salle Turn Over and Merger ===
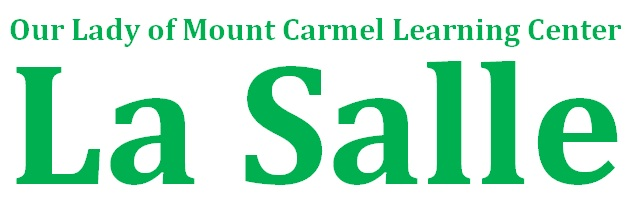
Our Lady of Mount Carmel Learning Center, De La Salle Supervised

In June 2000, Mount Carmel La Salle, also a University of St. La Salle-supervised school in Roxas City, decided to turn over the management of its high school to USLS-AC due to the growing number of students and limited space of its school. Mount Carmel La Salle (OLMCLC) decided to retain and maintain its Pre-School and Grade schools. The first principal of the high school department was Mrs. Marilyn Centillo. Mrs. Floramae Billanes was appointed principal effective SY 2001–2002. Also, USLS-AC started its application for the BS Nursing program. Consequently, DepEd granted approval for the opening of Pre–School and Grade 1 effective SY 2002–2003. Infrastructure improvements were the construction of basketball court, guard house, canteen, high school Home Economics room, and perimeter fence at the back of the main building.

In 2013, Our Lady of Mt. Carmel Learning Center merged with the School and officially closed its campus in Kalipayan Rd., Punta Tabuc.

=== Name changed to La Salle Affiliate College ===
At the start of SY 2002–2003, the name of the school was changed to La Salle Affiliate College. It was in that significant school year that the Preparatory School and Grade 1 were opened also under the management of Mrs. Billanes. The three academic programs at the college level were granted government recognition. The Commission on Higher Education (CHED) granted Government Permit to LSAC to operate the first year level of BS Nursing effective SY 2003–2004. Mrs. Judy Roxas visited LSAC to turn over the proceeds of a benefit concert of Ogie Alcasid, Randy Santiago, and Zsa Zsa Padilla that was used in the construction of the Covered court roof.

=== Supervised by De La Salle University-Manila ===
In May 2003, Dr. Rosemarie Montañano (from De La Salle University) became the Executive Vice-president and Dean of the College of Arts and Sciences of LSAC and it was followed by the appointment of Atty. Antonio Ortiz as President of the school on July 26, 2003, since the post was vacated by Br. Rolando Dizon, FSC who was given the Chairmanship of the CHED. The supervision of the school was transferred to De La Salle University-Manila and Br. Armin Luistro FSC became the Chairman of its Board Of Trustees (BOT) (now DepEd Secretary). The BS Nursing Program was opened and Mrs. Ma. Ruby Fullon was appointed Dean. Ms. Rowena Banes became the Principal of the Integrated School succeeding Mrs. Billanes. For the first time, LSAC submitted itself for Lasallian Schools Supervision Office (LASSO) Assessment Level 1. Also, in this school year, the second floor of the preschool building was completed.

In June 2004, Mrs. E. Regina V. Dabao was appointed principal of the preschool, grade school, and high school. Infrastructure projects came to rise with the construction of the stage and two grade school classrooms. It was in this school year that Dr. Allyn Ricafuente was appointed dean of the College of Nursing.

=== Name changed to College of St. John-Roxas ===
In April 2005, the BoT, upon the advice of the Lasallian Schools Supervision Office (LASSO), decided to change the name of the school to College of St. John - Roxas. Br. Armin Luistro FSC (now DepEd Secretary) came to Roxas to strengthen the decision. The administration decided to offer an AB English program, appointing Mr. Mark Nel Venus as its chair. In 2006, the CSJ-R was assessed Level 1 by the Lasallian Schools Supervision Office (LASSO).

For the school year 2006–2007, the College of Nursing had a new Dean in the person of Mr. Gilmore Solidum. The high school building was constructed and the Grade School building was completed. The first batch of BS Nursing graduates in April 2007.

In June 2007, Dr. Rosemarie Montañano ended her term as EVP of CSJ-R. Dr. Emma A. Encarnacion (former principal of La Salle Green Hills and presently the Vice President of Mercury Drug Inc.) became the Chancellor and Dean of the College of Arts and Sciences of CSJ-R. She was appointed by the BoT as chief executive officer (CEO) and Chief Operating Officer (COO) of the school. The transition paved the way to improving the school's operation and instruction based on the Lasallian tradition and orientation. Some of her initial projects were the repainting and improvement of the buildings and school grounds; review of the vision-mission, core values, and the formulation of the graduate attributes; review and revision of the curricula from Basic Education Unit (BEU) to College; and the Open House in the Basic Education Unit. In the college level, Mrs. Cora Diaz was appointed Dean of the College of Nursing by Dr. Encarnacion effective July 2007. The BSN pioneer batch took the December 2007 Nursing Licensure Exam garnering 68.75% against the national passing percentage of 43.3%. Also, the April 2007 batch of BS Accountancy got 66.67% against the national passing percentage of 40%, both the highest in Capiz.

Dr. Encarnacion together with the BoT reviewed and revised the organizational chart. For the first time in April 2008, there was an appointed dean other than the school head for the College of Arts, Sciences and Business (CASB) in the person of Dr. Roxanne Ibañez-Edrosolano. The other new appointees are Ms. Jovi Albor as Finance Services Unit (FSU) Head, Mr. Mark Nel Venus as Assistant Dean for Students Affairs, Ms. Betty Miranda as Clinical Coordinator, Ms. Vanessa Rasco as Controller, Ms. Eimee Potato as Academic Support Services Office (ASSO) Director, Ms. Agatha Sheila Matutina as Office of Administrative Services (OAS) Director and Mr. Nestor Paul Pingil as Assistant Principal for Academic Affairs.

In May 2009, Dr. Gloria S. Chavez (former Dean of Business Administration of DLSU-D) was appointed by the BOT as President-Chancellor and was formally installed on July 8, 2009, by Br. Armin A. Luistro FSC, Chairman of the BOT and President of De La Salle University-Manila and President and chief executive officer of De La Salle Philippines, (now Deped Secretary). Prior to Dr. Chavez' appointment, she was an educator, administrator, researcher, and has rendered meritorious service in other La Salle schools. In 2010, Nursing Board exam, the College of Nursing got a 100% passing rate for its first takers and in CPA Board exam, the Accountancy department got 60% passing rate, the highest in the province of Capiz.

=== K-12 years (2012-present) ===
In 2012, the school graduated from the supervision of the Lasallian Schools Supervision Office and has installed in its campus the marker of Excellence after having assessed Level II-the highest assessment given to a De La Salle supervised school. Br. Narciso S. Erguiza (President of DLSU, President of CEAP) became its new chairman of the Board of Trustees as Br. Armin A. Luistro FSC accepted the post as DepEd Secretary.

In 2013, the Grade school and high school batches topped the National Achievement Test (NAT) among the Private schools in Roxas City and got the highest rating in critical thinking in the Roxas City Division.

In April 2014, the College of St. John–Roxas became a member of the Association of Lasallian Affiliated Schools and at the same time applied to De La Salle Philippines to be a District School.

In May 2014, Ms. Evita Regina Viterbo Dabao was appointed as president-chancellor. Mr. Mark Nel R. Venus and Joey D. Arroyo were appointed principals of high school and grade school respectively. Ms. Marie Fe Dela Cruz was appointed dean of the College of Arts, Sciences, Business and Teacher Education and Mr. Xerxes Malaga as dean of the College of Nursing. Ms. Pamela Hazel Bediones, CPA was appointed head of finance. In the same year, the construction of an additional building, which will be later known as the "senior high school building" started.

The school has won several awards regionally and nationally. It has won twice the collegiate debate competitions sponsored by Bombo Radyo. It has received various awards in the MILO Twin Tournament including the Sportsmanship Award in the Regional Tournament. In February 2015, its high school debating team won the championship among public and private schools in Capiz and Roxas City. Mr. Mark Nel R. Venus was the coach of the Debating team and has been instrumental in the development of debate in the institution.

In October 2015, the Department of Education has given the school a government permit to offer senior high school with the following strands: Science, Technology, Engineering Mathematics (STEM), Accountancy, Business and Management (ABM) and General Academic (GA). It has also advanced the preparation of senior high school program by linking to Health Centrum, a state-of-the-art hospital and the Sacred Heart of Jesus Prime Holdings Inc and various industries to enrich its curricular offerings.

Dela Cruz resigned from her post on December 14, 2015. Although separate, the two colleges (CASBTE and CN) were merged as one but remained separate in January 2016. Mr. Xerxes Malaga, RN, the CN dean, became the dean of both departments.

In 2016, the school celebrated its 17th Foundation Day Celebration.

In June 2017, a series of transition and new appointments paved the way for better service. A new organizational chart was created and a more vibrant strategic plan directed school's operations and system. Mr. Christopher Obispado was appointed as vice chancellor for administration, Mr. Joey Arroyo as vice chancellor for academics and Mr. Xerxes Malaga as vice chancellor for PEARL. In October 2017, Ms. Angeline Marcelino was appointed as the new principal of the Basic Education Unit.

In June 2018, Br. Narciso S. Erguiza, FSC became its president and Ms. Evita Regina V. Dabao retained her position as the Chancellor. Ms. Kristine Joy Sauler was appointed as the Vice Chancellor for Students and Mission. The school became a member of Lasallian Schools Supervision Services Association. The same year, it was granted an Institutional Development and Innovation Grants (IDIG) fund for Research and school development and had implemented Robotics Program.

In the year 2019, the school instituted the designation of the three Associate Principals for Primary, Intermediate, and Secondary. They were Ms. Genebe B. Gayo, Ms. Raziel Q. Cabalonga, and Ms. Marriza J. Delogar respectively. Alongside, Sir Genesis Ambrocio was elected as the President of the PTCA, Transition as well in the Presidency of the Board of Trustees happened in this year as Engr. Antonio Balgos assumed the position. In the midst of the pandemic and as the world grapple into mitigating its effect, the school welcomed a new leadership in the person of Dr. Joey D. Arroyo as the new appointed President – Chancellor by the board of trustees.

In 2023 the full face to face classes was implemented. The High School department garnered the Most Outstanding Private School for High School – Small School Category in the Tinimakasan Awarding Ceremony. Sir Judy J. Daliva was appointed as the Director for Student Affairs, directly working with the rest of the administrators. For the Board of Trustees, the Presidency was assumed by Ms. Jessica O. Yu. This school year, 2024 – 2025, to efficiently manage the growing population of the school, offices and administrators were installed. The school reverted its Vice Chancellors to work closely with the President – Chancellor. For Vice Chancellor for Academics and Research, Ms. Angeline B. Marcelino, for Vice Chancellor for Students and Mission, Sir Judy J. Daliva, and for Vice Chancellor for Administrative Support and Services, Ms. Lalaine F. Luza. Succeeding the position of Ms. Angeline Marcelino as the High School Principal was Ms. Marriza Delogar-Albina while Ms. Raziel Q. Cabalonga continuously serves as the Principal for the Grade School.

In November 2025, Ms. Dabao returned as acting President-Chancellor until the appointment of Dr. Consolacion Advincula Feca in March 2026. On April 30, the school appointed Sr. Darwin S. Borreros as Junior High School Associate Principal and Sr. Johbert T. Flores as Senior High School Associate Principal, thus succeeding Ms. Albina as principal and splitting the role of the High School principal, while Ms. Cabalonga retained her role as the Grade School Associate Principal.

== Courses offered ==
These are the courses offered in CSJ-R. In 2012, the school offered a new degree course which is BS Real Estate Management. College of St. John Roxas became the first school in Capiz to offer this course.

- BS Psychology
- BS Accountancy
- BS Nursing
- BS Business Administration Major in Operation Management
- Bachelor of Secondary Education Major in English
- BS Real Estate Management (new course)

SENIOR HIGH SCHOOL OFFERINGS: (With Government Permit SHS 105, s.o. 2016)

- STEM (Science, Technology, Engineering, Mathematics)
- ABM (Accountancy, Business and Management)
- HUMSS (Humanities and Social Sciences)

Industry Linkages:

- Association of Lasallian Affiliated Schools (ALAS)-Student Development, Exposure, Faculty Development, Field Trip, Exchange program, Benchmarking, Research
- La Salle Green Hills-student Development, Exposure, Faculty Development, Field Trip, Exchange program, Benchmarking, availment of seminars and workshops, simulation, Research
- De La Salle University-Faculty Development, Exchange programs, research
- The Health Centrum: Exposure, Immersion, Input to curriculum, research, OJT
- Sacred Heart of Jesus Prime Holdings, Inc-Exposure, Immersion, Input to curriculum, research, OJT
- BDO-Exposure, input to curriculum
- Chambers of Commerce-Research, inputs to curriculum
- Business People Inc-Exposure, Immersion, Input to curriculum, research, OJT
