= Terrorist Hunter =

2005 Filipino action film

- Directed by: Val Iglesias
- Written by: Jorge Isaac
- Produced by: Col. Jerry Valeroso
- Starring: Eddie Garcia; Ronald Gan
- Cinematography: Apolinar Cuenco
- Edited by: Rudy Tabotabo
- Music by: Ed Barcena
- Production company: Double Impact Films
- Release date: December 25, 2005
- Country: Philippines
- Languages: Filipino; English
- Budget: ₱20 million
- Box office: ₱1.9 million

Terrorist Hunter is a 2005 Filipino action film directed by Val Iglesias from a script by Jorge Isaac and starring Eddie Garcia, Ronald Gan, Dennis Roldan, Jess Sanchez, Maricar de Mesa, Alma Soriano, Ramon Christopher, Alvin Anson, Isaac and Camille Roxas.

Produced by Double Impact Films in 2003, the film was released on December 25, 2005 as an entry to the 31st Metro Manila Film Festival. Earning only ₱1.9 million by the end of the festival against a budget of approximately ₱20 million, it was a box-office bomb.

== Cast ==
- Eddie Garcia as Capt. Samson
- Ronald Gan
- Dennis Roldan as Malik
- Jess Sanchez
- Maricar de Mesa
- Alma Soriano
- Ramon Christopher
- Alvin Anson
- Jorge Isaac
- Camille Roxas
- Val Iglesias
- Rhey Roldan
- Ernie Zarate
- Pyar Mirasol
- Bob Soler
- Lito Legaspi as Gen. Cruz
- Lauro Flores
- Bong Ledesma
- Bong Ruso

== Production ==
Actress KC Castillo was initially included in the film with her scenes already shot, but due to her casting in another company's film, a temporary restraining order was filed against her.

Director Val Iglesias stated that unlike his previous films, Terrorist Hunter did not resort to using computer graphics for its action scenes.

On February 20, 2005, actor and producer Dennis Roldan, who portrayed a terrorist-kidnapper in the film, was arrested for the February 9 kidnapping of a Chinese-Filipino boy in Pasig City. Due to this, Col. Jerry Valeroso later bought the rights to the film and became its producer.

== Release ==
Shot in 2003, Terrorist Hunter was submitted as an entry to the 31st Metro Manila Film Festival, where it received enough votes from the festival committee to be included in the first batch of entries shown on December 25, 2005.

=== Box office ===
The film was among the three lowest-grossing films out of the ten entries of the festival, earning just ₱1.9 million by the festival's end.
