= 2005 Metro Manila Film Festival =

Film festival edition

- Date: December 25, 2005 to January 7, 2006
- Site: Manila

Highlights
- Best Picture: Blue Moon
- Most awards: Kutob (6)

The 31st Metro Manila Film Festival was held in Manila, Philippines from December 25, 2005 to January 7, 2006.

Zsa Zsa Padilla, Marvin Agustin and the movie, Blue Moon topped the 2005 Metro Manila Film Festival. The festival's Best Picture award went to Regal Films' Blue Moon, while the Best Actress and Best Actor awards were awarded to Padilla and Agustin for their roles in Mano Po 4: Ako Legal Wife and Kutob respectively. The Best Supporting Actor and Actress awards went to Jose Manalo for Enteng Kabisote 2: Okay Ka Fairy Ko: The Legend Continues and Cherry Pie Picache for Mano Po 4: Ako Legal Wife.

== Entries ==
There are two batches of films in competition, the first batch was shown from December 25, while the second batch was shown on January 1, 2006.

Title	Starring	Studio	Director	Genre
First batch
Enteng Kabisote 2: Okay Ka Fairy Ko... The Legend Continues!	Vic Sotto, Kristine Hermosa, Alice Dixson, Oyo Boy Sotto, Bing Loyzaga, Aiza Seguerra, Jeffrey Quizon, Jose Manalo, Victor Neri	Octoarts Films and M-Zet Productions	Tony Y. Reyes	Comedy, Fantasy
Exodus: Tales from the Enchanted Kingdom	Ramon 'Bong' Revilla, Aubrey Miles, Iya Villania, Benjie Paras, Jay-R, Paolo Bediones, BJ "Tolits" Forbes	Imus Productions and Media Asia Distribution	Erik Matti	Action, Fantasy
Kutob	Rica Peralejo, Marvin Agustin, Alessandra de Rossi, Andrea del Rosario, Ana Capri, James Blanco, Liza Lorena, Ryan Agoncillo	Octoarts Films	Jose Javier Reyes	Horror, Thriller
Mano Po 4: Ako Legal Wife	Rufa Mae Quinto, Cherry Pie Picache, Jay Manalo, Zsa Zsa Padilla, John Prats, JC de Vera, Bianca King	Regal Films	Joel Lamangan	Comedy, Drama
Mulawin: The Movie	Richard Gutierrez, Angel Locsin, Dingdong Dantes, Dennis Trillo, Iza Calzado, Karylle, Bianca King, Michael de Mesa, Valerie Concepcion, Sunshine Dizon, Carmina Villarroel, Eddie Gutierrez, Zoren Legaspi, Amy Austria	Regal Films and GMA Films	Dominic Zapata	Action, Adventure, Fantasy
Shake, Rattle & Roll 2k5	Episode 1: "Poso" - Ai-Ai delas Alas, Gloria Romero, Yasmien Kurdi, Rainier Castillo, Marco Alcaraz; Episode 2: "Aquarium" - Ara Mina, Ogie Alcasid, Faisal Daquigan, Wilma Doesnt; Episode 3: "Ang Lihim ng San Joaquin" - Mark Anthony Fernandez, Tanya Garcia, Elizabeth Oropesa, Nonie Buencamino, Ronnie Lazaro	Regal Films	Richard Somes, Rico Maria Ilarde	Horror, Comedy
Terrorist Hunter	Eddie Garcia, Ronald Gan Ledesma, Dennis Roldan, Maricar de Mesa	Double Impact Films, Leo Films and MMG Entertainment International	Val Iglesias	Action
Second batch
Blue Moon	Christopher de Leon, Dennis Trillo, Boots Anson-Roa, Eddie Garcia, Jennylyn Mercado, Mark Herras, Pauleen Luna, Polo Ravales	Regal Films	Joel Lamangan	Romance, Drama
Lagot Ka sa Kuya Ko!	Ronnie Ricketts, Carlos Morales, Angelica Jones, Nadine Samonte, Dinky Doo, Mariz Ricketts, John Apacible	Rocketts Productions and RonRick Films	Ronnie Ricketts	Action
Mourning Girls	Ricky Davao, Glydel Mercado, Chin Chin Gutierrez, Assunta de Rossi	Teamwork Productions and Zennet World Productions	Gil Portes	Comedy, Drama

== Winners and nominees ==
=== Awards ===
Winners are listed first and highlighted in boldface.

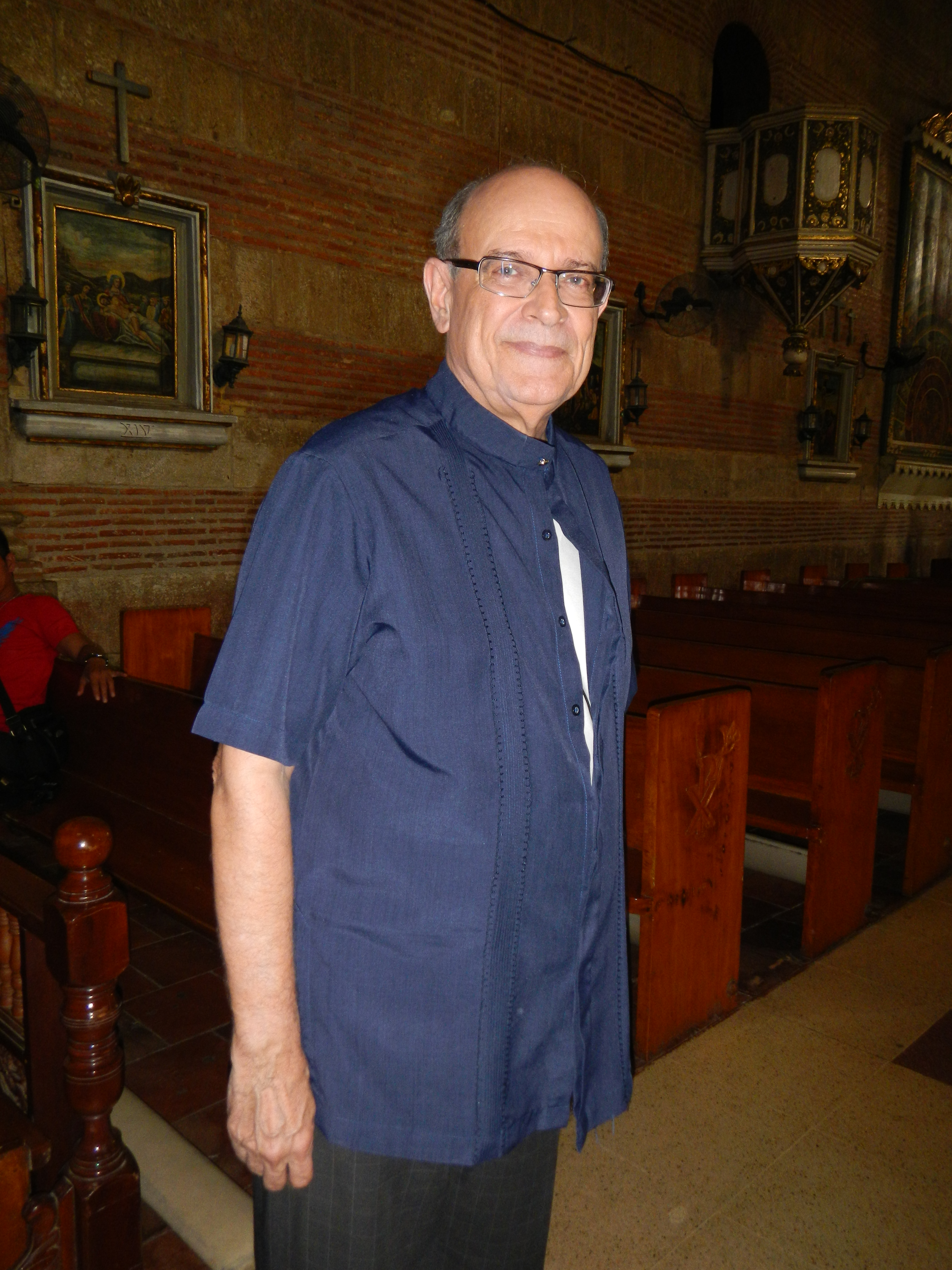
Jaime Fabregas, Best Musical Score winner

Best Picture	Best Director
**Blue Moon - Regal Films**; Exodus: Tales from the Enchanted Kingdom - Imus Productions and Media Asia Distribution (2nd Best Picture); Kutob - Canary Films (3rd Best Picture)	**José Javier Reyes - Kutob**
Best Actor	Best Actress
**Marvin Agustin – Kutob**	**Zsa Zsa Padilla – Mano Po 4: Ako Legal Wife**
Best Supporting Actor	Best Supporting Actress
**Jose Manalo - Enteng Kabisote 2: Okay Ka Fairy Ko: The Legend Continues**	**Cherry Pie Picache - Mano Po 4: Ako Legal Wife**
Best Cinematography	Best Production Design
**Lyle Sacris - Exodus: Tales from the Enchanted Kingdom**	**Richard Somes - Exodus: Tales from the Enchanted Kingdom**
Best Child Performer	Best Editing
**Paul Salas - Shake, Rattle & Roll 2k5**	**Vito Cajili - Kutob**
Best Original Story	Best Screenplay
**Allan Tijamo - Blue Moon**	**Allan Tijamo - Blue Moon**
Best Original Theme Song	Best Musical Score
**Thor ("Kasalanan Nga Ba?") - Kutob**	**Jaime Fabregas - Kutob**
Best Visual Effects	Best Make-up Artist
**Ignite Media - Exodus: Tales from the Enchanted Kingdom**	**Baby Lucero - Exodus: Tales from the Enchanted Kingdom**
Best Sound Recording	Best Float
**Ditoy Aguila - Exodus: Tales from the Enchanted Kingdom**	-
Most Gender-Sensitive Film
**Blue Moon - Regal Films**
Gatpuno Antonio J. Villegas Cultural Awards
**Kutob - Canary Films**

== Multiple awards ==
Awards	Film
6	Kutob
5	Exodus: Tales from the Enchanted Kingdom
4	Blue Moon
2	Mano Po 4: Ako Legal Wife

== Ceremony Information ==
=== "Best Director" issue ===
Director Joel Lamangan walked out after he lost to Jose Javier Reyes. Lamangan failed to win the Best Director for Blue Moon against Reyes' Kutob. In the same year, Regal Films's matriarch Lily Monteverde voiced out her disappointment as she lamented that some winners in the festival were "undeserving."

== Box Office gross ==
Entry	Gross Ticket Sales			
Entry	December 25	December 27	January 1	January 7
Enteng Kabisote 2: Okay Ka Fairy Ko: The Legend Continues	₱ 12,400,000*	₱ 24,000,000*	₱ 59,700,000*	₱ 108,370,227.35*
Exodus: Tales from the Enchanted Kingdom	₱ 10,800,000	₱ 17,000,000	₱ 41,700,000	₱ 75,642,647.35
Mulawin: The Movie	₱ 8,500,000	₱ 15,000,000	₱ 34,000,000	₱ 55,782,190.53
Mano Po 4: Ako Legal Wife	₱ 5,500,000	₱ 10,000,000	₱ 28,000,000	₱ 48,454,749.55
Shake, Rattle & Roll 2k5	₱ 5,800,000	₱ 10,000,000	₱ 21,500,000	₱ 32,340,930.45
Blue Moon	–	–	₱ 2,700,000	₱ 15,492,394.15
Kutob	₱ 2,800,000	₱ 4,500,000	₱ 9,000,000	₱ 10,803,280.50
Terrorist Hunter	₱ 750,000	₱ 1,000,000	₱ 1,800,000	₱ 1,914,335.90
Lagot Ka Sa Kuya Ko	–	–	₱ 450,000	₱ 1,657,001.25
Mourning Girls	–	–	₱ 400,000	₱ 1,513,238.37
			TOTAL	₱ 351,970,995.40

Preceded by 2004 Metro Manila Film Festival	Metro Manila Film Festival; 2005	Succeeded by 2006 Metro Manila Film Festival
