= BJ Forbes =

Filipino actor (born 1998)

- Born: Bernard Joecel Forbes; March 27, 1998 (age 28); Manila, Philippines
- Other names: Tolits, BJ
- Occupations: Child actor, model, host
- Years active: 2003–present
- Agent: APT Entertainment

Bernard Joecel Forbes (born March 27, 1998) is a Filipino actor. He first appeared on TV as a contestant in That's My Boy on Eat Bulaga!, however he become a finalist and also he didn't win.

== Career ==
After his stint on That's My Boy, he found fame through a Tide commercial in which he played a character named Tolits. He soon became one of the hosts of GMA Network's Eat Bulaga!.

Apart from Eat Bulaga!, he has appeared in TV shows such as Ful Haus, Encantadia, Etheria, and Fantastikids. He has also been featured in movies such as Ispiritista: Itay, may moomoo!—for which he won the Best Child Actor award in the 24th Famas Awards--Exodus: Tales from the Enchanted Kingdom, Enteng Kabisote 3, Paraiso, Dobol Trobol, and Ded Na si Lolo. He has also lent his voice to the character of Botyok in the animated movie Urduja.

== Filmography ==
=== Film ===
Year	Title	Role	Notes
2005	Ispiritista: Itay, May Moomoo!	Tom-Tom	
2005	Exodus: Tales from the Enchanted Kingdom	Silab	
2006	Enteng Kabisote 3: Okay Ka, Fairy Ko	Dingding	
2007	Paraiso: Tatlong Kwento ng Pag-asa	Silab	indie film
2008	Urduja	Botyok (voice)	
2008	Dobol Trobol: Lets Get Redi 2 Rambol!	Nikki	
2009	Ded na si Lolo	Joyet	indie film
2009	Ang Panday	Popoy	
2013	Pedro Calungsod: Batang Martir	Francisco	
2013	Saka Saka	Young Alex	indie film
2014	BaryaBoys		indie film
2015	Ritwal ng Kapatiran		indie film
2015	Tandem		indie film

=== Television ===
Year	Title	Role
2004–2005	Mulawin	Niwalum
2005–2008; 2012; 2017	Eat Bulaga!	Host
2005	Magpakailanman	Various Roles
2005–2007	Lovely Day	Tolits
2005–2006	Etheria: Ang Ikalimang Kaharian ng Encantadia	young Aquil
2006	Fantastikids	Don-Don
2007	Mga Kuwento ni Lola Basyang	Almion
2007–2009	Ful Haus	One-two
2007	Kamandag	
2008–2010	Toogs	Himself
2008	Joaquin Bordado	Young Jilco
2009	Sugat ng Kahapon	Young Sonny
2009	Totoy Bato	Bogart
2009–2010	Moomoo and Me	Jun-jun
2010	Midnight DJ: Sikreto ng Swing	Guest
2010	My Driver Sweet Lover	Bert Ngisi
2011	Maalaala Mo Kaya: Krus	Royce
2012	Maalaala Mo Kaya: Kamao	EJ
2012	Sunday Funday	Himself
2012	Maalaala Mo Kaya:Bangka	Raymart
2012	Maynila: Rules of Love	Paolo
2012	Maynila: Too Young To Be In Love	Nathan
2012	Maalaala Mo Kaya: Flower Shop	Toto
2013	Kidlat	Young Voltaire
2013	Lakbayin ang Magandang Pilipinas	Himself
2013	Wagas	Himself
2013	Maalaala Mo Kaya: Sapatos	Nakaaway ni Juanito
2014	Eat Bulaga! Lenten Presentation (Holy Tuesday)	Himself
2014	One of the Boys	Sonny
2014	Maalaala Mo Kaya: Tutong	
2014	Mars	Guest
2015	Maynila: Totoy's Tru Lab	Totoy
2015	Sabado Badoo	Himself/Cameo
2015	Pangako Sa 'Yo	Adam
2016	Dear Uge	
2017	Tadhana: Sundo	Dennis
2019	Ngayon at Kailanman	Buboy
2019	Sahaya	Arlo
2023	Pepito Manaloto: Tuloy ang Kwento	Martin
2024	Makiling	Errol
2024	Black Rider	Mario

== Discography ==
- Tolits - Dance Hits (2006)

== Accolades ==
=== Awards and nominations ===
Year	Organization	Category	Nominated work	Remarks
2006	24th Luna Awards	Best Child Actor for	Ispiritista	Won
2006	54th FAMAS Awards	Best Child Actor	Exodus: Tales from the Enchanted Kingdom	Won
2007	2007 GMMSF Box-Office Entertainment Awards	Most Popular Child Actor	Enteng Kabisote 3: Okay ka, Fairy ko	Won
2013	27th PMPC Star Awards for TV	Best Single Performance by an Actor	Maalaala Mo Kaya: Bulaklak	Nominated
