= JR Valentin =

Filipino actor

J.R. Valentin
- Born: Florante Valentin; February 9, 1982 (age 43); Las Piñas, Philippines
- Occupation(s): Film Actor, Model
- Years active: 2004–2008

Florante "J.R." Valentin (born February 9, 1982, in Las Piñas) is a Filipino actor and model. He is best known for his role as Victor Perez, an idealistic police officer, in the 2005 drama The Blossoming of Maximo Oliveros (Filipino: Ang pagdadalaga ni Maximo Oliveros).

== Filmography ==
=== Television ===
| Year | Title | Episode | Role |
|---|---|---|---|
| 2007 | Pedro Penduko at ang mga Engkantao | | Balmont |
| 2006 | Komiks | "Vincent" | - |
| 2006 | Maalaala Mo Kaya | "Jeepney" | - |

=== Movies ===
| Year | Title | Role |
|---|---|---|
| 2008 | Desperadas | Nick |
| 2006 | Seroks | Drunk Man |
| 2006 | D' Lucky Ones | Ralph |
| 2005 | Ako Legal Wife | Alex |
| 2005 | Hari ng Sablay | Dennis |
| 2005 | The Blossoming of Maximo Oliveros | Victor Perez |
| 2004 | Bridal Shower | Juancho |
