= Boy (2009 film) =

- Theatrical release poster
- Directed by: Auraeus Solito
- Screenplay by: Jimmy Flores; Arturo Calo
- Produced by: Auraeus Solito; Endi "Hai" Balbuena
- Starring: Aeious Asin; Aries Pena; Madelaine Nicolas; Nonie Buencamino
- Cinematography: Louie Quirino
- Edited by: Lawrence Fajardo; Keith Sicat
- Music by: Isha
- Release dates: April 19, 2009 (SIFF); October 7, 2009 (Philippines)
- Running time: 83 minutes
- Country: Philippines
- Language: Filipino

Boy is a 2009 Philippine film by director Auraeus Solito. The 83-minute film produced by recounts a young poet's infatuation with a young macho dancer.

Boy (also as BoY) has been shown in many international film festivals. The Board of Film Censors in Singapore banned the showing of the movie because it "normalizes homosexuality and romanticizes sex between men." Boy was screened in the Philippines in June 2009.

== Cast ==
- Aeious Asin - Boy
- Aries Pena - Aries
- Madelaine Nicolas - Boy's mother
- Nonie Buencamino - Aries's father
- Danton Remoto - Teacher

== Festivals ==
Boy had its world premiere in Italy at the Torino Gay and Lesbian Film Festival (April 2009). Other festival screenings included:

- Outfest Los Angeles Gay and Lesbian Film Festival
- Jeonju International Film Festival in South Korea (Asian premiere)
- ImagineNATIVE Film and Media Arts Festival in Toronto (Canadian premiere)
- Image+Nation Montreal
- Frameline Film Festival (San Francisco International Lesbian and Gay Film Festival)
- Seattle International Film Festival
