= Fantastikids =

2006 Philippine television drama series

- Title card
- Genre: Fantasy drama; Adventure
- Written by: Elmer Gatchalian
- Directed by: Jun Lana; Zoren Legaspi
- Starring: Marky Cielo; Isabella de Leon; BJ Forbes
- Theme music composer: Sam Santos
- Opening theme: "Magtiwala Ka" by Shamrock
- Country of origin: Philippines
- Original language: Tagalog
- No. of episodes: 33

Production
- Executive producers: Wilma Galvante; Winnie Hollis-Reyes
- Camera setup: Multiple-camera setup
- Running time: 27–36 minutes
- Production company: GMA Entertainment TV

Original release
- Network: GMA Network
- Release: May 6 – December 9, 2006

Fantastikids is a 2006 Philippine television drama fantasy adventure series broadcast by GMA Network. Directed by Jun Lana and Zoren Legaspi, it stars Marky Cielo, Isabella de Leon and BJ Forbes. It premiered on May 6, 2006. The series concluded on December 9, 2006, with a total of 33 episodes.

The series is streaming online on YouTube.

== Cast and characters ==
Cast

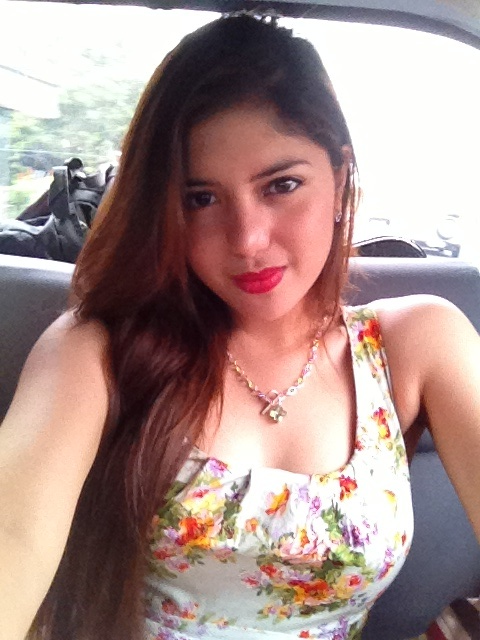
Isabella de Leon

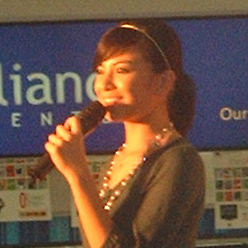
Glaiza de Castro

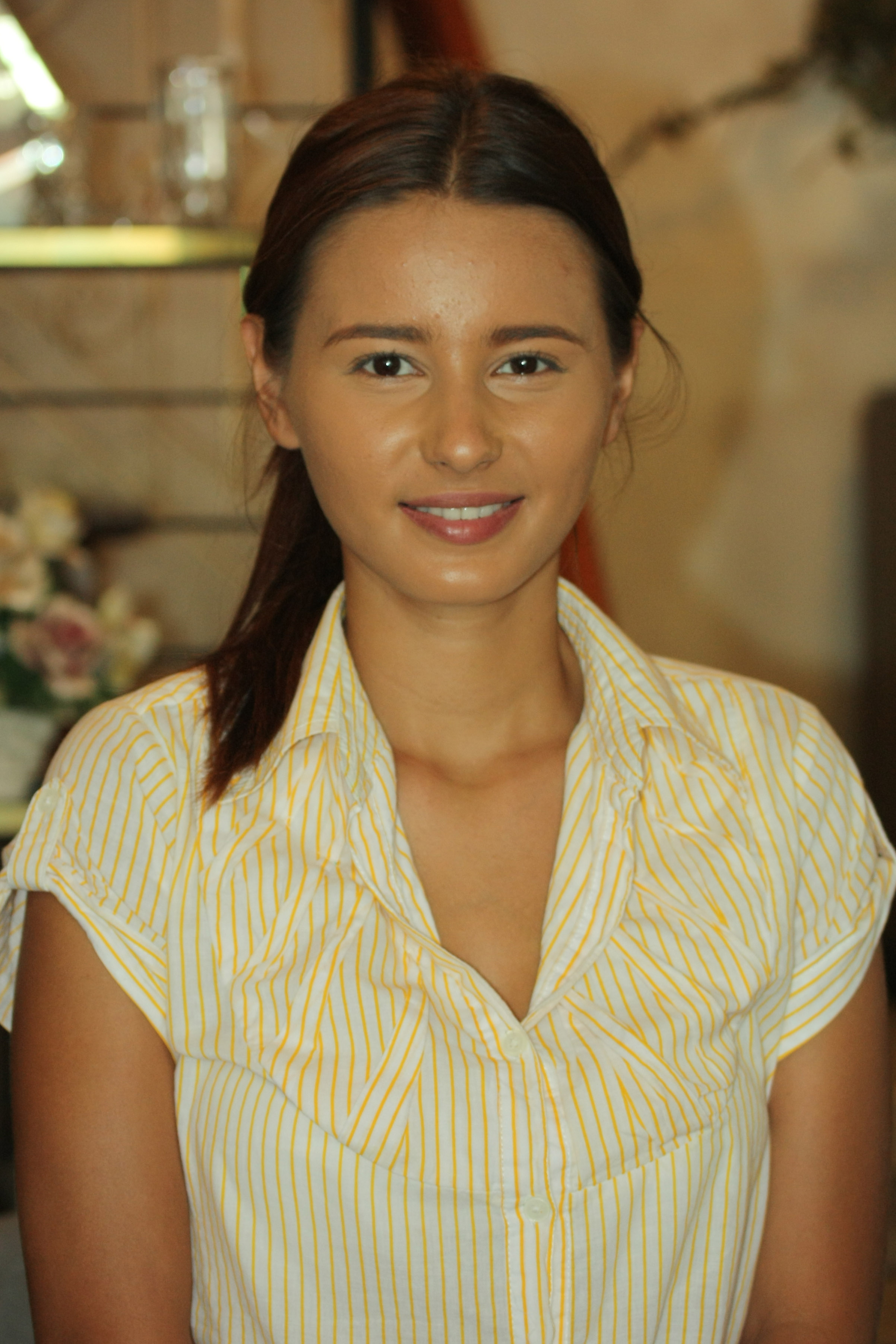
Jackie Rice

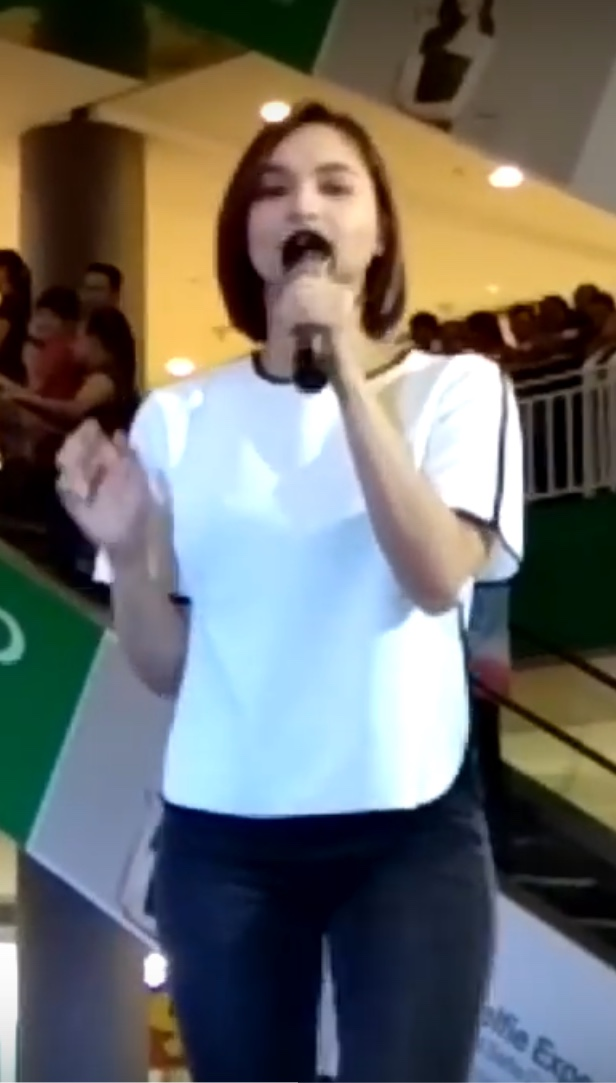
Ryza Cenon

Lead cast

- Marky Cielo as Daniel
- Isabella De Leon as Diana
- BJ Forbes as Don-Don

Supporting cast

- Glaiza de Castro as Honey
- Sandy Andolong as Melinda
- Melanie Marquez as Lucila
- Bodjie Pascua as Domeng
- Paolo Contis as Richard
- Jackie Rice as Princess
- Francine Prieto as Armana
- Ryza Cenon as Annabel
- Dominic Roco as Bogz
- Felix Roco as Atoy
- Justin Rosana as Wena
- Vangie Labalan as Bebang
