= Our Lady of Mount Carmel Learning Center =

Roman Catholic elementary school in Capiz, Philippines

Our Lady Of Mount Carmel Learning Center
- Other names: Mount Carmel La Salle
- Type: Lasallian
- Active: 1989–2013 (merged to College of St. John-Roxas
- Religious affiliation: Roman Catholic
- Academic affiliations: De La Salle Brothers, University of St. La Salle, College of St. John-Roxas, Lasallian Schools Supervision Office and Capiz Private Schools Athletic Assn.
- Location: Roxas City, Capiz, Philippines; 11°34′23″N 122°44′57″E
- Campus: Kalipayan Rd., Punta Tabuc
- Hymn: De La Salle Alma Mater
- Colors: Green, white & gold
- Sporting affiliations: Capiz Private Schools Athletic Association, Inc.
- Website: www.delasallesupervisedschools.org
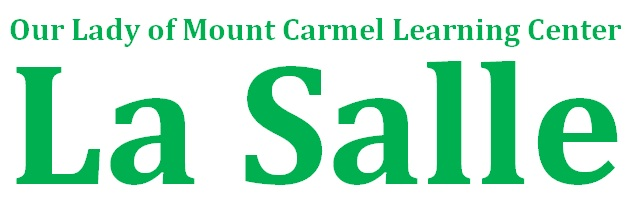

Our Lady of Mount Carmel Learning Center (OLMCLC), also known as Mount Carmel La Salle or simply Mount Carmel, was a private Catholic elementary school run under the direct supervision of the De La Salle Brothers, a Roman Catholic religious order founded by St. John Baptist de la Salle, the patron saint of teachers. It is located in Calipayan Road, Punta Tabuc, Roxas City, Capiz, Philippines. Originally named Mt. Carmel Family Life Learning Center, the school started as a preschool for indigent children at the residence of Atty. Virginia Patiño with eight students. It later transferred to its current site in Punta Tabuc after the school was able to purchase a land and received a grant from a German foundation.

== History ==
In response to the suggestion of Sor Paula Vargas of St. Anthony College Hospital to build a school for indigent children, Atty. Virginia Patiño founded Mount Carmel Family Life Learning Center with solicited support from individuals of the Christian Family Movement.

In 1988, two rooms in the ground floor of Patiño's house were converted into improvised classrooms. Nursery and Kinder classes started with two teachers, Ms. Vivian Abagatnan and Ms. Ariza Villanueva, who were later joined by Ms. Glosan Avelino. It started with eight children, three indigent and five paying. In the second year of operation, the number of students were more than doubled.

Patiño spent a few months for compiling and consolidating document with pictures showing the living situations of street children. These were sent to a foundation in Germany, Bund der Deutschen Katholischen Jugend Papstliches Mission Work der Kinder, together with a project proposal. After a year or two, the German foundation donated a substantial amount to the school.

The money was used for the construction of two buildings with four rooms each. The school site is a lot offered by Mr. Candelario Patiño. The money from the sold lot was donated by the lot owner for the construction of the road going to the school. Later, an additional lot was donated by the same lot owner in exchange of the adjoining lot owned by Mrs. Paz Altavas where the road going to school lies.

In this new site, the Preparatory class and the newly opened Grade 1, which was handled by Mrs. Gloria Andrada, were housed. Out of the solicited money, a second hand mini-school bus was bought and the rest were allocated for salaries and other operating expenses. From then on, one Grade was added after the other end of the every school year. More teachers were hired and more classrooms were built.

=== Under the De La Salle Supervision ===
In 1995, Our Lady of Mount Carmel Learning Center became a La Salle school under the supervision of the University of St. La Salle with Mrs. Norma Tagle as the supervisor. The elementary level was completed in 1997 and the first graduation ceremony was held in March 1997.

June 1997 marked the inclusion of the first year High School for its courses. In June 2000, the board of trustees decided to turn over the management of its high school to the University of St. La Salle- Affiliate College (later renamed La Salle Affiliate College and then College of St. John-Roxas) due to the growing number of students and limited space of its school. Mount Carmel La Salle decided to retain and maintain its Pre-School and Grade School.

In 2013, the school stopped the admission of new and existing students and turned over its operations to its sister school, College of St. John-Roxas. Its facilities and campus in Calipayan later became the third campus of Colegio de la Purisima Concepcion, which houses the second section of the elementary department.

== See also ==
- La Sallian educational institutions
- Schools in Roxas City
