= The Blossoming of Maximo Oliveros =

- Official poster
- Directed by: Auraeus Solito
- Written by: Michiko Yamamoto
- Produced by: Raymond Lee; Auraeus Solito; Michiko Yamamoto
- Starring: Nathan Lopez; JR Valentin; Soliman Cruz; Neil Ryan Sese; Ping Medina
- Cinematography: Nap Jamir
- Edited by: Auraeus Solito; Clarence "Clang" Sison
- Music by: Pepe Smith
- Production companies: UFO Pictures; Cinemalaya
- Distributed by: ABS-CBN Film Productions (Philippines); Unitel Pictures (Philippines; 2006 re-release); Peccadillo Pictures (UK); Unico Entertainment (US); Cathay-Keris Films (Singapore); MNC Media (Indonesia)
- Release dates: July 13, 2005 (Cinemalaya Independent Film Festival); November 30, 2005 (Philippines)
- Running time: 100 minutes
- Country: Philippines
- Language: Filipino
- Box office: $38,691 (worldwide)

The Blossoming of Maximo Oliveros (Filipino: Ang Pagdadalaga ni Maximo Oliveros) is a 2005 Filipino coming-of-age comedy-drama film co-produced, co-edited, and directed by Aureaus Solito (in his directorial debut) from a story and screenplay written by Michiko Yamamoto. Set in the slums of Manila, the film is about a gay teen who is torn between his love for a young cop and his loyalty to his family. The film stars Nathan Lopez in the title role, with JR Valentin, Soliman Cruz, Neil Ryan Sese, and Ping Medina in supporting roles.

The film premiered at the 1st Cinemalaya Film Festival in 2005 and was the official entry of the Philippines to the 79th Academy Awards. It has been included in various lists of best LGBTQ films.

== Plot ==
Maxi (Nathan Lopez) is a 12-year-old effeminate gay boy who lives in the slums with his father and brothers, who are petty thieves. The story primarily revolves around the conflict between his love for handsome young police officer Victor (JR Valentin), and his family's illegal livelihood. Neo-realist in orientation, the film is a tale of lost innocence and redemption amidst the poverty of Manila's slums.

Maxi behaves like a girl, wearing clips or a hairband in his hair, bangles on his wrists, and even wearing lipstick. He is teased by neighbors and former school friends. His sexuality is, however, fully accepted by his two brothers and by his father. One night, he is accosted by two men who attempt to molest him, but is saved by the appearance of Victor. Victor does not have a girlfriend, and his sexuality is kept ambiguous. However, he does rebuff Maxi's advances. In a key event, Maxi's father, his brother Bogs, and Bogs' friends hatch a plan to teach Victor a lesson for snooping into their business. They leave him bloodied and beaten up. Just as Victor saved him, it was Maxi who arrived to clean Victor's wounds and cook breakfast for him. Maxi felt sorry and felt somehow responsible for his injuries. Victor then affectionately stroked Maxi's hair, and Maxi gave him a kiss on the cheek.

After Maxi's father is killed by Victor's boss, which Maxi witnesses, Maxi resists Victor's attempts to renew their friendship. The closing scene shows Maxi walking past Victor, who has parked by the roadside on Maxi's way to school. He ignores Victor as he passes him, hesitates momentarily as he crosses the road, then goes on his way. This last scene is a homage to the final scene of "The Third Man".

== Cast ==
- Nathan Lopez as Maximo Oliveros
- Soliman Cruz as Paco Oliveros
- JR Valentin as Victor Perez
- Neil Ryan Sese as Boy Oliveros
- Ping Medina as Bogs Oliveros
- Bodjie Pascua as New Sergeant
- Elmo Redrico as Sarge
- Ivan Camacho as Art
- Lucito Lopez as Police
- Jett Desalesa as Leslie
- Anastacio Cruz as Nar
- Roychell Torre as Monique
- Peter Antony Tumbaga as Peter
- Edwin Pamanian as Isko
- Rodney Luengu as Mang Axel
- Claudine Najera as Janet
- Rebecca Padilla as Lolet
- Arnold Cruz as Onnie

== Release ==
The Blossoming of Maximo Oliveros premiered at the 1st Cinemalaya Independent Film Festival on July 13, 2005, and was released theatrically in the Philippines on November 30, 2005. The film was screened at the 56th Berlin International Film Festival in Germany on February 11, 2006, and the 2006 Las Palmas de Gran Canaria International Film Festival in Spain on March 28, 2006. It was also screened in film festivals in Canada, Singapore, United States, Spain, Hong Kong, Italy, Greece, India, France, United Kingdom, Japan, Estonia, Thailand, Hungary, Switzerland, and South Korea.

=== Box office ===
The Blossoming of Maximo Oliveros grossed $28,041 in United States and Canada, and $10,650 in other territories, for a worldwide total of $38,691.

=== Critical reception ===
The Blossoming of Maximo Oliveros received mostly positive reviews. V.A. Musetto of New York Post praised Solito's direction, noting that, "Preteen sexuality is a sensitive subject, but director Auraeus Solito handles it with dignity, never becoming exploitative." Critics also praised Lopez' performance. Nathan Lee of The New York Times wrote, "The newcomer Nathan Lopez delights as the flamboyantly gay Maxi." Tom Dawson of BBC wrote, "Newcomer Lopez is wholly convincing in the lead role."

On review aggregator website Rotten Tomatoes, the film has an approval rating of 89% based on 19 reviews. On Metacritic the film has a score of 70% based on reviews from 7 critics. Kevin Thomas of Los Angeles Times described the film as "one of the finest Filipino film, shimmering with folkloric charm without softening its view of the harshness and injustice of a life of poverty." Ernest Hardy of LA Weekly wrote "One of those all-too-rare films that handle preadolescent queerness with intelligence and unflinching honesty."

Many critics categorized The Blossoming of Maximo Oliveros as a neo-realist film. Keith Uhlich of Slant Magazine described the film as "a neorealist homo noir." Dennis Harvey of Variety wrote, "an unusually low-key Filipino drama whose neo-realist air generally triumphs over the script's violent, fearful contrivances."

In June 2021, Slant Magazine included the film in its list of 100 Best LGBTQ Films of All Time. It was also included in British Film Institute's 10 Great Gay Films from East and Southeast Asia.

=== Accolades ===
The Blossoming of Maximo Oliveros received several awards and nominations. In the Philippines, the film was named Best Picture during the 2006 Gawad Urian Awards and was also named Best Filipino Film of the Decade at the 2010 Gawad Urian Awards. During the 2005 Cinemalaya Independent Film Festival, the film received the Balanghai Trophy for Best Production Design for Clint Catalan. It also received a Special Jury Prize for Solito and Special Citation for Lopez.

The film also made the rounds of international film festivals. It received the Teddy Award (Feature Film) and Glass Bear-Special Mention (Feature Film) at the 56th Berlin International Film Festival. During the 2006 Las Palmas de Gran Canaria International Film Festival, the film received the Golden Lady Harimaguada and Lopez was named as Best Actor. The film was recipient of the Golden Zenith Award for Best Picture at the 2005 Montreal World Film Festival in Canada. The film was also given the NETPAC Award at the 2006 International Film Festival Rotterdam in the Netherlands "for the human portrayal of life on the margin and the touching performance of Nathan Lopez who plays 'Maxi.'

The film was awarded Best Picture during the 2005 imagineNative Film+Media Arts Festival in Canada and Best Film at 2005 Asian Festival of First Films in Singapore.

=== Adaptations ===
In November 2013, eight years after its initial release, The Blossoming of Maximo Oliveros was adapted into a musical entitled Maxie the Musicale: Ang Pagdadalaga ni Maximo Oliveros by Bit by Bit Productions, in association with Philippine Educational Theater Association.

== Awards ==
Award	Date of ceremony	Category	Recipients	Result	Ref.
Asian Festival of First Films (Singapore)	November 30, 2005	Best Film	The Blossoming of Maximo Oliveros	Won	
Berlin International Film Festival (Germany)	February 19, 2006	Best Feature Film (Teddy)	The Blossoming of Maximo Oliveros	Won	
Berlin International Film Festival (Germany)	February 19, 2006	Best Feature Film (Crystal Bear-Special Mention)	The Blossoming of Maximo Oliveros	Won	
Berlin International Film Festival (Germany)	February 19, 2006	Deutsches Kinderhilfswerk Grand Prix	The Blossoming of Maximo Oliveros	Won	
Cinemalaya Independent Film Festival (Philippines)	July 17, 2005	Best Film (Special Jury Prize)	The Blossoming of Maximo Oliveros	Won	
Cinemalaya Independent Film Festival (Philippines)	July 17, 2005	Best Performance of an Actor (Special Citation)	Nathan Lopez	Won	
Cinemalaya Independent Film Festival (Philippines)	July 17, 2005	Best Production Design	Lily Esquillon	Won	
Gawad Urian Award (Philippines)	2005	Best Picture	The Blossoming of Maximo Oliveros	Won	
Gawad Urian Award (Philippines)	2005	Best Direction	Aureaus Solito	Nominated	
Gawad Urian Award (Philippines)	2005	Best Actor	Nathan Lopez	Nominated	
Gawad Urian Award (Philippines)	2005	Best Supporting Actor	Soliman Cruz	Nominated	
Gawad Urian Award (Philippines)	2005	Best Cinematography	Nap Jamir	Won	
Gawad Urian Award (Philippines)	2005	Best Editing	Clarence Sison, Aureaus Solito	Won	
Gawad Urian Award (Philippines)	2005	Best Music	Pepe Smith	Nominated	
Gawad Urian Award (Philippines)	2005	Best Production Design	Clint Catalan, Christina Dy, Lily Esquillon	Nominated	
Gawad Urian Award (Philippines)	2005	Best Screenplay	Michiko Yamamoto	Won	
imagineNative Film + Media Arts Festival (Canada)	October 23, 2005	Best Dramatic Feature	The Blossoming of Maximo Oliveros	Won	
Independent Spirit Awards (United States)	February 4, 2007	Best International Film	The Blossoming of Maximo Oliveros	Nominated	
International Film Festival Rotterdam (Netherlands)	February 5, 2006	NETPAC Award (Ex Aequo)	The Blossoming of Maximo Oliveros	Won	
Las Palmas de Gran Canaria International Film Festival (Spain)	2006	Golden Lady Harimaguada	Auraeus Solito	Won	
Las Palmas de Gran Canaria International Film Festival (Spain)	2006	Best Actor	Nathan Lopez	Won	
Montreal World Film Festival (Canada)	September 5, 2005	Golden Zenith Award for Best Picture	The Blossoming of Maximo Oliveros	Won	

== See also ==
- List of submissions to the 79th Academy Awards for Best Foreign Language Film
- List of Philippine submissions for the Academy Award for Best Foreign Language Film
