= Kutob =

- DVD cover
- Directed by: Jose Javier Reyes
- Written by: Jose Javier Reyes
- Produced by: Orly R. Ilacad
- Starring: Marvin Agustin; Rica Peralejo; Alessandra de Rossi; Ryan Agoncillo
- Cinematography: Lito 'Itok' Mempin
- Edited by: Vito Cajili
- Music by: Jaime Fabregas
- Production company: Canary Films
- Distributed by: OctoArts Films
- Release date: December 25, 2005 (Philippines)
- Running time: 101 minutes
- Country: Philippines
- Language: Filipino
- Box office: ₱11 million

Kutob (lit. 'Foreboding') is a 2005 Filipino supernatural psychological horror film directed by Jose Javier Reyes.

The film was a box office success in the Philippines, with both Reyes and Agustin also winning the Best Director and Best Actor awards respectively at the 2005 Metro Manila Film Festival; the film itself came third at the festival.

The film contains elements of supernatural and psychological horror without being overtly of those genres, drawing comparisons in places to two American films; namely, Psycho and Carrie.

== Synopsis ==
Erica (Rica Peralejo) is having problems with her boyfriend Carlo (Ryan Agoncillo), whom she suspects of womanizing. She and her best friend, Mayen (Alessandra de Rossi), consult a fortune-teller who warns about danger that lurks ahead. When Erica ignores this, her relationship with Carlo worsens then her friends Amy (Ana Capri) and Lemuel (Marvin Agustin) intervenes. Erica tries to patch things up with Carlo but Lemuel, who is protecting a hidden desire for her, also has some things to finish.

== Cast ==
=== Main cast ===
- Rica Peralejo as Erica
- Marvin Agustin as Lemuel
- Alessandra de Rossi as Mayen
- Ryan Agoncillo as Carlo

=== Supporting cast ===
- James Blanco as RJ
- Liza Lorena as Guada
- Ana Capri as Amy
- Bing Loyzaga as Rowena
- Andrea del Rosario as Sandra
- Valerie Concepcion as Tet
- Eugene Domingo as Salve
- John Wayne Sace as young Lemuel

== Awards ==
Year	Award-Giving Body	Category	Recipient	Result
2005	Metro Manila Film Festival	Best Director	José Javier Reyes	Won
2005	Metro Manila Film Festival	Best Actor	Marvin Agustin	Won
2005	Metro Manila Film Festival	Best Editing	Vito Cajili	Won
2005	Metro Manila Film Festival	Best Original Theme Song	Thor ("Kasalanan Nga Ba?")	Won
2005	Metro Manila Film Festival	Best Musical Score	Jaime Fabregas	Won
2005	Metro Manila Film Festival	Gatpuno Antonio J. Villegas Cultural Awards	Kutob	Won

== See also ==
- List of ghost films
