= Blue Moon (2006 film) =

2006 Philippine romantic drama film directed by Joel Lamangan

- Theatrical poster
- Directed by: Joel Lamangan
- Written by: Allan Tijamo
- Produced by: Lily Y. Monteverde; Roselle Monteverde-Teo
- Starring: Eddie Garcia; Christopher de Leon; Boots Anson-Roa; Mark Herras; Dennis Trillo; Jennylyn Mercado
- Cinematography: Lyle Nemenzo Sacris
- Edited by: Marya Ignacio
- Music by: Von de Guzman
- Production company: Regal Films
- Distributed by: Regal Entertainment
- Release date: January 1, 2006
- Running time: 108 minutes
- Language: Filipino

Blue Moon is a 2006 Philippine romantic drama film. Directed by Joel Lamangan, it stars Eddie Garcia, Christopher de Leon, Boots Anson-Roa, Mark Herras, Dennis Trillo, and Jennylyn Mercado. It was released by Regal Films.

The first choice for the film's title was Nasaan Ka Man (Wherever You Are), while Nasaan Ka Nang Kailangan Kita (Where Were You when I Needed You) was the second.

== Plot ==
Ill and with only six months to live, a man named Manuel has one thing left that he wants to do, which is to find his beloved Corazon. His family has its own problems, with his son Rod is still mourning his wife's death, while grandson, Kyle has recently been dumped by his wife Peggy.

Manuel embarks on his search in Ilocos but is unable to locate her. Rod and Kyle pick him up from Ilocos, and on the way home Manuel takes the opportunity to tell them about his past and why he was in Ilocos.

In his youth, Manuel's best friends included a fellow named Domingo, Corazon or Cora, and Azon. Manuel falls in love with the lively and cheery Azon, not knowing that Cora has a secret crush on him. When Azon tells Manuel that her mother wants to move far away, she asks him to come with them but Manuel declines. Before spending the night together, Azon gives Manuel a piece of her pendant, and tells him that if the pendant returns, then they are meant to be together. Manuel wakes up with Azon gone.

Not long after, the Second World War erupts and Manuel and Domingo join the army. Azon tries to find a way to say goodbye to Manuel but is unable to reach him and instead meets Domingo, who explains the situation. Azon gives Domingo her address and asks him to tell Manuel to find her.

During the war, Domingo and Manuel are captured by the Japanese and walk the Death March. Domingo is wounded so badly that he can't walk. Domingo gives Manuel Azon's address, and then forces him to leave. Manuel reluctantly follows, and eventually survives the war. He is reunited with Cora in a hospital, where she is a nurse. While waiting to recover from a foot injury, Manuel sees that Cora cares for him deeply and the two embark on a romance. Cora is soon pregnant and she marries Manuel. After Cora gives birth, she decides to leave Manuel seeing that he is still in love with Azon. Before she leaves, she gives him half a picture of her, saying that if the two halves are reunited again, that means that they are meant to be together, much like what Azon had said to Domingo with her pendant.

In the present, Manuel's son and grandson reluctantly decide to help him after realizing that they are searching for Azon, the woman who broke up their family. In time, the trio are successful with their search and it is revealed that Manuel was actually looking for his wife, Cora, whom he realized he really loved after she had left him, while Azon is already dead.

The story ends when Manuel and Corazon dance in a night of blue moon, a wish she had stated when they were still married. Manuel dies some time later.

== Cast ==
Main cast

- Eddie Garcia as Manuel Pineda
  - Mark Herras as young Manuel
- Boots Anson-Roa as Corazon
  - Jennylyn Mercado as young Cora / Corazon
- Christopher de Leon as Rod Pineda
- Dennis Trillo as Kyle Pineda
- Pauleen Luna as Azon / Corazon

Supporting cast

- RJ Rosales as Reginald Tuason
- Polo Ravales as Domingo
- Reggie Curley as Abe
- Christine Bersola-Babao as herself (as Tintin Bersola-Babao)
- Paolo Paraiso as a pilot
- Vangie Labalan as Carmencita
- Tin Arnaldo as Peggy
- Pinky Amador as Grace
- Janna Victoria as a pilot's wife

== Awards ==
- 31st Metro Manila Film Festival-Philippines (2005) Best Picture, Best Story and Best Screenplay
- Texter's choice Best Actress - Jennylyn Mercado
- Texter's choice Best Actor - Mark Herras
- 2006 Gawad Tanglaw's Best Supporting Actress Award - Jennylyn Mercado
- 2006 Gawad Urian (Best Supporting Actress Nomination) - Jennylyn Mercado
- 2006 Star Awards for Movies (Best Actress Nomination) - Jennylyn Mercado
- 2006 Luna Awards (Best Supporting Actress Nomination) - Jennylyn Mercado
- 2006 Enpress Awards (Best Actress Nomination) - Jennylyn Mercado

=== Metro Manila Film Festival ===
This film was submitted to the 31st Metro Manila Film Festival in 2005, where it was initially disqualified by the selection committee for allegedly being a different film from the original submitted script. Its nomination was later reconsidered after the production argued that the story was the same, albeit re-titled. From the original Philippine playdate of December 25, 2005 (the start of the Metro Manila Film Festival), it was moved to January 1, 2006.

Awards

Year	Award-Giving Body	Category	Recipient	Result
2005	31st Metro Manila Film Festival	Best Picture	Blue Moon	Won
2005	31st Metro Manila Film Festival	Best Original Story	Allan Tijamo	Won
2005	31st Metro Manila Film Festival	Best Screenplay	Allan Tijamo	Won
2005	31st Metro Manila Film Festival	Most Gender-Sensitive Film	Blue Moon	Won

== Soundtrack ==
Orange and Lemons sang "Blue Moon", the official theme song of the film.

== See also ==
- Regal Films
- 2005 Metro Manila Film Festival
