= Exodus: Tales from the Enchanted Kingdom =

- Directed by: Erik Matti
- Written by: Dwight Gaston
- Produced by: Andrea Bautista; Marlon Bautista; Dondon Monteverde; Dave Hukom; Dennis Mendiola
- Starring: Ramon 'Bong' Revilla Jr. Aubrey Miles; Iya Villania; Benjie Paras; Jay R Paolo Bediones; BJ Forbes
- Cinematography: Lyle Nemenzo Sacris
- Edited by: Aleks Castañeda
- Music by: Von de Guzman
- Production companies: Imus Productions; Reality Entertainment; Enchanted Kingdom; Ignite Media Inc.
- Distributed by: Imus Productions; Media Asia Distribution
- Release date: December 25, 2005
- Running time: 106 minutes
- Country: Philippines
- Language: Filipino
- Budget: ₱80 million
- Box office: ₱90 million

Exodus: Tales from the Enchanted Kingdom is a 2005 Filipino fantasy film directed by Erik Matti from a script by Dwight Gaston. Starring Ramon "Bong" Revilla Jr. as the titular character, the film was produced by Imus Productions and Reality Entertainment in cooperation with Ignite Media Inc. and Enchanted Kingdom Inc., with the title alluding to the latter's theme park. It was released on December 25, 2005 as an official entry to the 31st Metro Manila Film Festival.

== Plot ==
The film opens in the Enchanted Kingdom, where the story is narrated by a wizard in purple (the Enchanted Kingdom theme park's mascot).

Ordinary humans led by King Bantayan, a comatose man, living only through a life support device and with dwarves maintaining it, are being annihilated by the all-powerful evil king Bagulbol and his creatures of the dark, created from human hatred and human experiments. To end their tribulation, mankind’s leaders paid a mercenary with exceptional fighting skills to defend them. That mercenary is Exodus, the drifter.

Nearing their extinction, King Bantayan and the leaders of men dispatched Exodus on a quest to capture five elementals to aid them in the final battle against King Bagulbol. Exodus was able to convince the last Earth (Tikbalang), Wind (Aswang), Fire (Santelmo), and Water (Water Nymph) elementals and they became allies in ridding the land of evil. Later it was revealed that Exodus is also last of the remaining Baylan (priestly race), exterminated many years ago by King Bagulbol. His minions are created by the human captives that was experimented and allowed hatred to consume them.

Exodus and his enchanted friends fought several enemies, including a whip wielding General, an Executioner, an Archer and a Harpy like creature and were victorious. Exodus faced both Bagulbol and his card reader sidekick and beat them, while the remaining human defenders are holding their ground, suffering severe casualties and destruction of their last hideout due to evil minion attacks. They conquered humankind's greatest enemy and peace was again established. And the Elementals return to their places. He then recreated his father's kingdom with the remaining humans.

== Cast ==
- Ramon "Bong" Revilla Jr. as Exodus, a Baylan and the main protagonist, drifter, mercenary and a paid soldier, revealed as the last equalizer and hope for freedom.
  - Ramboy Revilla as a young Exodus
  - Jolo Revilla as teenage Exodus
- Benjie Paras as Tayho, the Earth Elemental, a wild and active Tikbalang
- Aubrey Miles as Bangkila, the Air Elemental, an Aswang that is disguised as a scarecrow, with sharp claws, reminiscent of the creature from Jeepers Creepers.
- Iya Villania as Lin-Ay, the Water Elemental, a Water Nymph chained and sealed due to her curse (her excessive beauty).
- BJ Forbes as Silab, the Fire Elemental, a Santelmo that can divide into three (2 Spear-holding clones and the real body).
- Paolo Bediones as Maestro Eliseo, the comatose leader of the Bantayan.
- Mark Gil as Moreto
  - Minco Fabregas as young Moreto
- Jay-R / Gene Palomo (voice) as King Bagulbol, a corrupted dark priest and the primary antagonist that killed Exodus' father.
- Long Mejia as Alas, King Bagulbol's messenger, soothsayer and card wielding sidekick.
- Ramon Revilla Sr. as King Avalon
- Phoemela Barranda as Queen Alana
- ER Ejercito as Magkal
- Gwen Almonte as Uwak
- Boy Roque as Daguob
- Eva Cadelina as Kilat
- King Gutierrez as Burog
- Brian Revilla as tenyente ng bantayan
- Ram Revilla as tenyente ng bantayan
- Bobbie Zialcita / Joonee Gamboa (voice) as Eldar the wizard and the narrator
- Erik Matti as voice of the Manwit

== Production ==
In addition to his directorial duties, Erik Matti is credited as a 2nd camera operator. Stuntman and actor Baldo Marro served as 2nd unit director for Exodus.

== Awards ==
Year	Award-Giving Body	Category	Recipient	Result
2006	54th FAMAS Awards	Best Child Actor	Anthony Flores	Won
2006	54th FAMAS Awards	Best Visual Effects	Ignite Media	Won
2006	ENPRESS Golden Screen Awards	Best Visual Effects	Ignite Media	Won
2006	Luna Awards	Best Production Design	Richard V. Somes	Won
2005	Metro Manila Film Festival	2nd Best Picture	Exodus: Tales from the Enchanted Kingdom	Won
2005	Metro Manila Film Festival	Best Cinematography	Lyle Sacris	Won
2005	Metro Manila Film Festival	Best Make-up Artist	Baby Lucero	Won
2005	Metro Manila Film Festival	Best Production Design	Richard V. Somes	Won
2005	Metro Manila Film Festival	Best Sound Recording	Ditoy Aguila	Won
2005	Metro Manila Film Festival	Best Visual Effects	Ignite Media	Won
