= Zsa Zsa Padilla =

Filipino actress and singer (born 1964)

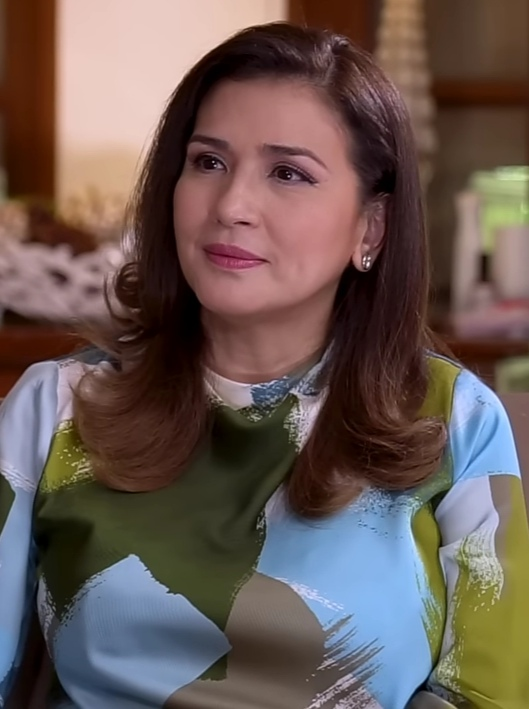
- Padilla in 2023
- Born: Esperanza Padilla y Perez; May 28, 1964 (age 62); Manila, Philippines
- Occupations: Singer; actress
- Years active: 1982–present
- Spouse: Modesto Tatlonghari (m. 1980; ann. 2011)
- Partners: Dolphy (1988–2012); Conrad Unglao (2014–present)
- Children: 3, including Karylle and Zia
- Parents: Carlos Padilla Jr. (father); Esperanza Perez (mother)
- Relatives: Amy Perez (cousin); Lorna Tolentino (cousin); Yael Yuzon (son-in-law); See Padilla family
- Musical career
- Genres: OPM; pop; adult contemporary

Esperanza "Zsa Zsa" Perez Padilla (born May 28, 1964) is a Filipino singer, actress, television host, music producer and businesswoman.

Referred to as the "Divine Diva", Padilla is recognized as one of the top female recording artists in the Philippines. Before going solo in 1982, Padilla began her career in the mid 70s with the Filipino band Hotdog. She has won a Gawad Urian Award, 2 FAP Awards, 3 Golden Screen Awards including the prestigious 'Decade Award' and received multiple nominations at the FAMAS Award. Padilla is also among the biggest-selling female music artists in the Philippines. According to Philippine Association of the Record Industry, some of her best-selling albums include: Ikaw Lamang (Gold), Zsa Zsa (4× Platinum), Sentiments (Platinum) and Unchanging Love (Gold). As an acclaimed actress, Padilla has played various genres ranging from drama, comedy and fantasy. She's best known for ZsaZsa Zaturnnah Ze Moveeh, Batang PX, Ako Legal Wife: Mano Po 4 and Minsan Lang Kitang Iibigin.

== Career ==
Padilla started in 1982 as the vocalist of the band Hotdog before going solo less than a year later in 1983. In 1987, she had her first TV acting role in the series, Lovingly Yours, Helen. In the same year, she had her first film role in Mga Anak ni Facifica Falayfay, with the Filipino comedian Dolphy, who became her partner of more than 20 years.

== Personal life ==
=== Family ===
Padilla was born as Esperanza Perez Padilla in 1964, the daughter of parents Esperanza "Kating" Felipa Perez and actor-sportsman Carlos "Sonny" Padilla, Jr. In 1980, at the age of 16, she wedded her 35-year-old boyfriend Modesto Tatlonghari, a dentist, with whom she had one daughter, Karylle (born 1981).

Despite her initial marriage, Padilla became a partner to comedian Rodolfo "Dolphy" Quizon in 1988, having two children with him: Nicole (adopted 1991) and Zia Denise Marie (born 1992). In 2001, Padilla filed for the annulment of her marriage to Tatlonghari, with Dolphy, having never married before, expressing his dream of finally entering into marriage with Padilla once her annulment is granted. Her church wedding was annulled in 2004, while her civil wedding was annulled in May 2011; Tatlonghari was reported to have remained "civil" and "cordial" in his relationship with Padilla after the annulment. Padilla's marriage to Dolphy, however, would not push through due to negative public reaction toward her relationship, with Dolphy later dying in July 2012.

In 2014, Padilla began a relationship with architect Conrad Onglao after being introduced to each other by singer Sharon Cuneta. Padilla and Onglao thus became live-in partners, with the two eventually deciding not to pursue marriage after Padilla went through another annulment process with a Japanese man she was unknowingly married to in 1992. The couple reside on a $6.8 million (or 361 million PHP) U-shaped mansion upon a 1,386 square-meter lot in Barangay San Lorenzo Village, while also owning a green holiday cottage called the Casa Esperanza in Lucban, Quezon.

=== Health concerns ===
Padilla suffers from a birth defect, megaureter since her left ureter caused her chronic urinary tract infection. In 2007, her first surgery was a minimally invasive procedure to remedy the ureter. In 2012, Padilla underwent partial left kidney nephrectomy. In 2024, she had a (pee) reflux which caused her third surgery, a laparoscopy at the Mount Elizabeth Hospital.

== Discography ==
=== Albums ===
Title	Record label	Year	Catalog	Producers	Format	Award
Am I Your Kind of Woman reissued as Kahit Na	Jem Records / Telesis Records, Vicor Music	1984, 2009	JLP-134; JC-134; TLS-KD-101; TELCD-1025	Producers: Willy Cruz & Margot M. Gallardo. Executive Produce: Margot M. Gallardo	LP, Cassette, CD	
Zsa Zsa ("the pink album")	Blackgold Records	1985	BA-5115; KBA-5115	Producers: Ed Formoso, Danny Favis, Dante Trinidad. Co-producer: Johnny Alegre. Executive Producer: Vic del Rosario, Jr.	LP & Cassette	
Ikaw Lamang	Blackgold Records	1986	BA-5131; KBA-5131	Producer: Chito Ilagan; Co-Producer: Johnny Alegre	LP & Cassette	Gold Record Award
Hitmakers Vol. 6 – Hiram and Eversince	Blackgold Records	1989	BA-5132; KBA-5132	Producer: Johnny Alegre	Compilation LP & Cassette	
Roots & Wings	Blackgold Records	1988	BA-5149; KBA-5149	Producer: Johnny Alegre	LP & Cassette	
Star Tracks Vol. 1 – Mambobola	Vicor Music	1987	TSP-5817, VSC-5817	Producer: Chito Ilagan; Co-Producer: Johnny Alegre	Compilation LP & Cassette	
Krismas	Blackgold Records	1989	KBA-5171	Producer: Johnny Alegre	Cassette	
Iisa	Blackgold Records	1990	BA-5176; KBA-5176; BCD-91-018	Producer: Jun Sta. Maria; Executive Producer: Chito Ilagan	Cassette & CD	
Walang Makakapigil	Warner Music Philippines	1994	Amazon ASIN: B001ESU4O4		CD	
Zsa Zsa	Viva Records	1998	Amazon ASIN: B07Q5WX89J	Executive producers: Vic del Rosario Jr., Vicente G. del Rosario III	CD	Quadruple Platinum Record Award
Sentiments	Viva Records	1999	Amazon ASIN: B07QB7JD49	Executive producers: Vic del Rosario Jr., Vicente G. del Rosario III	CD	Platinum Record Award
Sing Along with Zsa Zsa	Viva Records	2000		Executive producers: Vic del Rosario Jr., Vicente G. del Rosario III	CD	
In My Life ... Zsa Zsa Live	Viva Records	2001	VR-CAS-01049	Executive producers: Vic del Rosario Jr., Vicente G. del Rosario III	CD	
Love Concert, The Album (vols. 1 & 2)	Viva Records	2001	Amazon ASIN: B07Q826G7T	Executive producers: Vic del Rosario Jr., Vicente G. del Rosario III	CD	
Mahal Kita, Walang Iba	Viva Records	2002	Amazon ASIN: B07Q4NTJWV	Executive producers: Vic del Rosario Jr., Vicente G. del Rosario III	CD	
Sentiments Plus	Independent	2002			CD	
Zsa Zsa Silver Series	Viva Records	2006	Amazon ASIN: B07QY1RCTJ	Executive producers: Vic del Rosario Jr., Vicente G. del Rosario III	CD	
Am I Your Kind of Woman (reissue)	Vicor Music	2009	TELCD-1025	Producers: Willy Cruz & Margot M. Gallardo. Executive Produce: Margot M. Gallardo	CD	
Unchanging Love	PolyEast Records	2009			2CD	Gold Record Award
Hiram, A Divine Collection (Vicor 40th Anniversary Collection)	Vicor Music	2009	VCD-DA-001	Producers: Ed Formoso, Danny Favis, Dante Trinidad, Johnny Alegre, Chito Ilagan, Jun Sta. Ana. Executive Producer: Vic del Rosario, Jr.	2CD Compilation	
Palagi	PolyEast Records	2013			CD	
Beginnings	PolyEast Records	2015			CD	

=== Singles ===
==== Vinyl ====
Side A	Side B	Record label	Catalog	Producer	Year	Format
Kahit Na (Willy Cruz)	One World of Nescafe (Roger Nichols & Bill Lane) (Arranged by Willy Cruz)	Telesis Records	Telesis 1055	Producers: Willy Cruz & Margot M. Gallardo	1983	45-RPM Vinyl
Point of No Return (Louie Ocampo & Cocoy Laurel)	Instrumental version (Arranged by Louie Ocampo)	Blackgold Records		Producer: Louie Ocampo	1984	45-RPM Vinyl
Somewhere (Leonard Bernstein & Stephen Sondheim)	Instrumental Version (Arranged by Danny Favis)	Blackgold Records	BSP-370	Producer: Danny Favis	1984	45-RPM Vinyl
When I'm With You (Rene Novelles)	When I'm With You (minus one) (Arranged by Dante Trinidad)	Blackgold Records	BSP-392	Co-Producers: Ed Formoso, Dante Trinidad, & Johnny Alegre	1985	45-RPM Vinyl
Eversince (Alvina Eileen Sy)	Eversince (minus one) (Arranged by Dante Trinidad)	Blackgold Records	BSP-397	Producers: Dante Trinidad & Johnny Alegre	1985	45-RPM Vinyl
To Love You (Danny Javier)	To Love You (minus one) (Arranged by Menchu Apostol)	Blackgold Records	BSP-401	Producers: Dante Trinidad & Johnny Alegre	1985	45-RPM Vinyl
Hiram (George Canseco)	Hiram (minus one) (Arranged by Danny Tan)	Blackgold Records	BSP-404	Co-Producers: Johnny Alegre & Chito Ilagan; Executive Producer: Vic del Rosario, Jr.	1986	45-RPM Vinyl
Mambobola (Rey-An Fuentes)	Mambobola (minus one) (Arranged by Homer Flores)	Blackgold Records	BSP-410	Producer: Chito Ilagan; Associate Producer: Johnny Alegre	1986	45-RPM Vinyl
Ikaw Lamang (Dodjie Simon)	Ikaw Lamang (minus one) (Arranged by Menchu Apostol)	Blackgold Records	BSP-413	Producer: Chito Ilagan; Co-Producer: Johnny Alegre	1986	45-RPM Vinyl
Minsan Pa (Jun Sta. Maria & Peewee Apostol)	Minsan Pa (minus one) (Arranged by Menchu Apostol)	Blackgold Records	BSP-417	Producer: Chito Ilagan; Co-producer: Johnny Alegre	1986	45-RPM Vinyl
Maybe This Time (Marlene del Rosario)	Maybe This Time (minus one) (Arranged by Menchu Apostol)	Blackgold Records	BSP-432	Producer: Johnny Alegre	1988	45-RPM Vinyl
Pangako (Dodjie Simon)	Pangako (minus one) (Arranged by Egay Gonzales)	Blackgold Records	BSP-447	Producer: Johnny Alegre; Executive Producers: Fred Samantela & Chito Ilagan	1990	45-RPM Vinyl
Ang Aking Pamasko (Tony Velarde)	Ang Aking Pamasko (minus one) (Arranged by Egay Gonzales)	Blackgold Records	BSP-459	Producer: Johnny Alegre; Executive Producer: Sandra Chavez	1990	45-RPM Vinyl
Another Chance (John-John Macalisang)	Instrumental Version (Arranged by Romy Salcedo)	Blackgold Records	BSP-474	Producer: Jun Sta. Maria; Executive Producer: Chito Ilagan	1991	45-RPM Vinyl

==== Digital ====
Song	Record label	Catalog	Year	Format
Bridge Over Troubled Water (Paul Simon); From the album, Sentiments	Viva Records		1999	CD
Skyline Pigeon (Elton John & Bernie Taupin); From the albums, Mahal Kita, Walang Iba; and Zsa Zsa Silver Series	Viva Records		2002	CD
Time After Time (Cyndi Lauper & Rob Hyman); From the album, In My Life ... Zsa Zsa Live	Viva Records		2002	CD & VCD
I Honestly Love You (Jeff Barry & Peter Allen); From the album, In My Life ... Zsa Zsa Live	Viva Records		2002	CD & VCD
Through the Years (Steve Dorff & Marty Panzer); From the album, Zsa Zsa Silver Series	Viva Records		2006	CD
Ganyan Kita Kamahal (Jimmy Borja / Marilyn Villapando); From the album, Zsa Zsa Silver Series	Viva Records		2006	CD & Music video
Hanggang (Ron Cordero and Gigi Cordero); From the album, Palagi	PolyEast Records		2009	CD & Music video
Don't Give Up On Us Baby (David Soul); From the album, Sing Along With Zsa Zsa	Viva Records	VVCD 00 015	2000	CD & VCD
We're All Alone (Boz Scaggs); From the album, The Number 1 Album (Various Artists)	Viva Records		2002	CD
Dahil Mahal na Mahal Kita; From the TV serial, Magkano Ang Iyong Dangal? From the album, 60 Taon Ng Musika at Soap Opera (Various Artists)	ABS-CBN, Star Records		2010	Broadcast, Music video, & CD
Sana'y Maghintay Ang Walang Hanggan; From the TV serial, Kay Tagal Kang Hinintay; From the album, 60 Taon Ng Musika at Soap Opera (Various Artists)	ABS-CBN, Star Records		2010	Broadcast, Music video, & CD
Sayang; From the TV serial, Kahit Puso'y Masugatan	ABS-CBN		2012	Broadcast
Mahal Kita, Walang Iba (Ogie Alcasid); From the album, Mahal Kita, Walang Iba	Viva Records		2012	CD & Music video

== Concerts ==
List of headlining concerts, with dates and venues
Title	Date	Venue	Notes
Three's Company	June 1984	Rizal Theater, Makati	*Co-headliners: Jam Morales, Vernie Varga
All For Love: Zsa Zsa Padilla and Side A	February 13, 1999	Araneta Coliseum	
Divas 4 Divas	December 6, 2008	Araneta Coliseum	• Co-headliners: Regine Velasquez, Pops Fernandez and Kuh Ledesma.
Zsa Zsa: Beginnings	July 31, 2015	Newport World Resorts	• Guest stars include Martin Nievera and Karylle.
Zsa Zsa Padilla: The Best Day of My Life	May 11, 2018	Newport World Resorts	• Guest stars include Karylle and Zia Quizon.
Totally ZsaZsa	May 16, 2019	Newport World Resorts	• Guest stars include Ian Veneration, Karylle and Zeus Collins.
40 Na Zsa	November 11, 2023	Newport World Resorts	• A celebration of Zsa Zsa Padilla's 40th anniversary in the showbusiness.

== Filmography ==
=== Film ===
Year	Title	Role
1987	Mga Anak ni Facifica Falayfay	Cristina Mendoza
1987	Black Magic	Valerie
1988	Hiwaga sa Balete Drive	Margarita
1988	Magkano ang Iyong Dangal?	Era
1989	Starzan: Shouting Star of the Jungle	Jane
1989	Pahiram ng Isang Umaga	Lydia
1989	Bakit Iisa Lamang ang Puso?	
1989	Bote, Diyaryo, Garapa	
1989	Starzan 2: The Coming of Star Son	Jane
1989	My Darling Domestic: Greyt Eskeyp	
1990	Starzan III: The Jungle Triangle	Jane
1990	Og Must Be Crazy	Kathy
1993	Kung Ako'y Iiwan Mo	
1994	Minsan Lang Kita Iibigin	Monique
1994	Ang Ika-Labing Isang Utos: Mahalin Mo, Asawa Mo	Susan
1995	Father & Son	Lennie
1996	Madrasta	Sandra
1997	Batang PX	Tessie
1998	Tataynic	Rose Winshield
2000	Ika-13 Kapitulo	Sarah
2000	Mahal Ko	Shaina de Jesus
2002	Home Alone da Riber	Sandra
2003	Mano Po 2: My Home	Lu Shui
2005	Ako Legal Wife: Mano Po 4?	Chona Chong
2006	Zsazsa Zaturnnah Ze Moveeh	Zsa Zsa Zaturnnah
2008	Dobol Trobol: Lets Get Redi 2 Rambol!	cameo appearance with Pia Guanio
2009	Mano Po 6: A Mother's Love	Olivia Uy
2010	Paano Na Kaya	Carmina Marasigan
2010	Sigwa	Sita
2012	I Do Bidoo Bidoo: Heto nAPO Sila!	Elaine Fuentebella
2013	A Moment in Time	Miriam Javier
2015	You're Still the One	Cecilia
2017	Bes and the Beshies	Mabel
2017	Ang Larawan	Elsa Montes

=== Television ===
Year	Title	Role
1983–1987	GMA Supershow	Co-host
1993	GMA Telesine Presents: Camilla	Camilla
1994	GMA Telesine Presents: Mukha	
1994–95	Star Drama Presents: Zsa Zsa	
1995–96	Familia Zaragoza	Divina Zaragoza-Lagrimas
1997	Zsa Zsa Limited Engagement	Herself
1997	Maalaala Mo Kaya: Gitara	
1998–present	ASAP	Herself
1998	Hiwalay Kung Hiwalay, Daw!	
1999–2000	Labs Ko Si Babe	Mayor Diwata Royales
2001–02	Sa Puso Ko Iingatan Ka	Nieves Quevedo-Pacheco
2002–04	Morning Girls	Herself
2003–04	Star in a Million	Herself
2004	Born Diva	Herself
2006	Bituing Walang Ningning	Rosa Mia Suarez
2007-08	Mars Ravelo's Lastikman	Dra. Cynthia "Cindy" Evilone
2010	Maalaala Mo Kaya: Shell	Flor
2010	1DOL	Eleanor Serrano
2011–12	Budoy	Luisa Maniego
2013	Juan dela Cruz	Laura Alejandro
2014	Dyesebel	Elena "Ena" Villamayor-Montilla
2016	The Story of Us	Myra Simbulan
2017–18	Wildflower	Helena Montoya / Red Dragon
2019–present	It's Showtime	Hurado in Tawag ng Tanghalan (since Season 3 Quarter 3)
2020	Almost Paradise	Governor Nina Rosales
2020	Love Thy Woman	Helen Chao
2023	Cattleya Killer	Auri Melendez
2025–present	The Alibi	Jacqueline Cabrera

== Awards and nominations ==
Year	Award-giving body	Category	Work	Result
1991		Best Actress of the Year		Won
1994	Star Awards for Movies	Best Supporting Actress	Minsan Lang Kita Iibigin	Won
1995	Star Awards for Television	Best Actress in a Single Performance	Mukha	Won
1997	FAMAS Awards	Best Supporting Actress	Madrasta	Nominated
1997	FAP Awards	Best Supporting Actress	Madrasta	Nominated
1997	PMPC Star Awards for Movies	Movie Supporting Actress of the Year	Madrasta	Nominated
1998	Gawad Urian Awards	Best Actress	Batang PX	Won
1998	Film Academy of the Philippines Awards	Best Actress	Batang PX	Won
1998	PMPC Star Awards for Movies	Best Actress	Batang PX	Won
2005	31st Metro Manila Film Festival	Best Actress	Mano Po 4: Ako Legal Wife	Won
2006	Tanglaw Awards	Best Actress	Mano Po 4: Ako Legal Wife	Won
2006	Guillermo Mendoza Scholarship Foundation Awards	Film Actress of the Year	Mano Po 4: Ako Legal Wife	Won
2006	24th Luna Awards	Best Actress	Mano Po 4: Ako Legal Wife	Won
2006	3rd ENPRESS Golden Screen Awards	Best Performance by an Actress in a Leading Role (Musical or Comedy)	Mano Po 4: Ako Legal Wife	Won
2007	2nd ENPRESS Golden Screen Awards	Best Performance by an Actress in a Leading Role (Musical or Comedy)	Zsa Zsa Zaturnnah, ze Moveeh	Nominated
2009	35th Metro Manila Film Festival	Best Supporting Actress	Mano Po 6: A Mother's Love	Nominated
2010	12th Gawad PASADO Awards	Best Supporting Actress	Mano Po 6: A Mother's Love	Nominated
2011	ENPRESS Golden Screen Awards	Best Performance by an Actress in a Supporting Role (Drama, Musical or Comedy)	Sigwa	Won
2012	ENPRESS Golden Screen TV Awards	Outstanding Supporting Actress in a Drama Series	Budoy	Nominated
2014	ENPRESS Golden Screen TV Awards	Outstanding Supporting Actress in a Drama Series	Juan dela Cruz	Nominated
