= Auraeus Solito =

Filipino film director

Kanakan-Balintagos
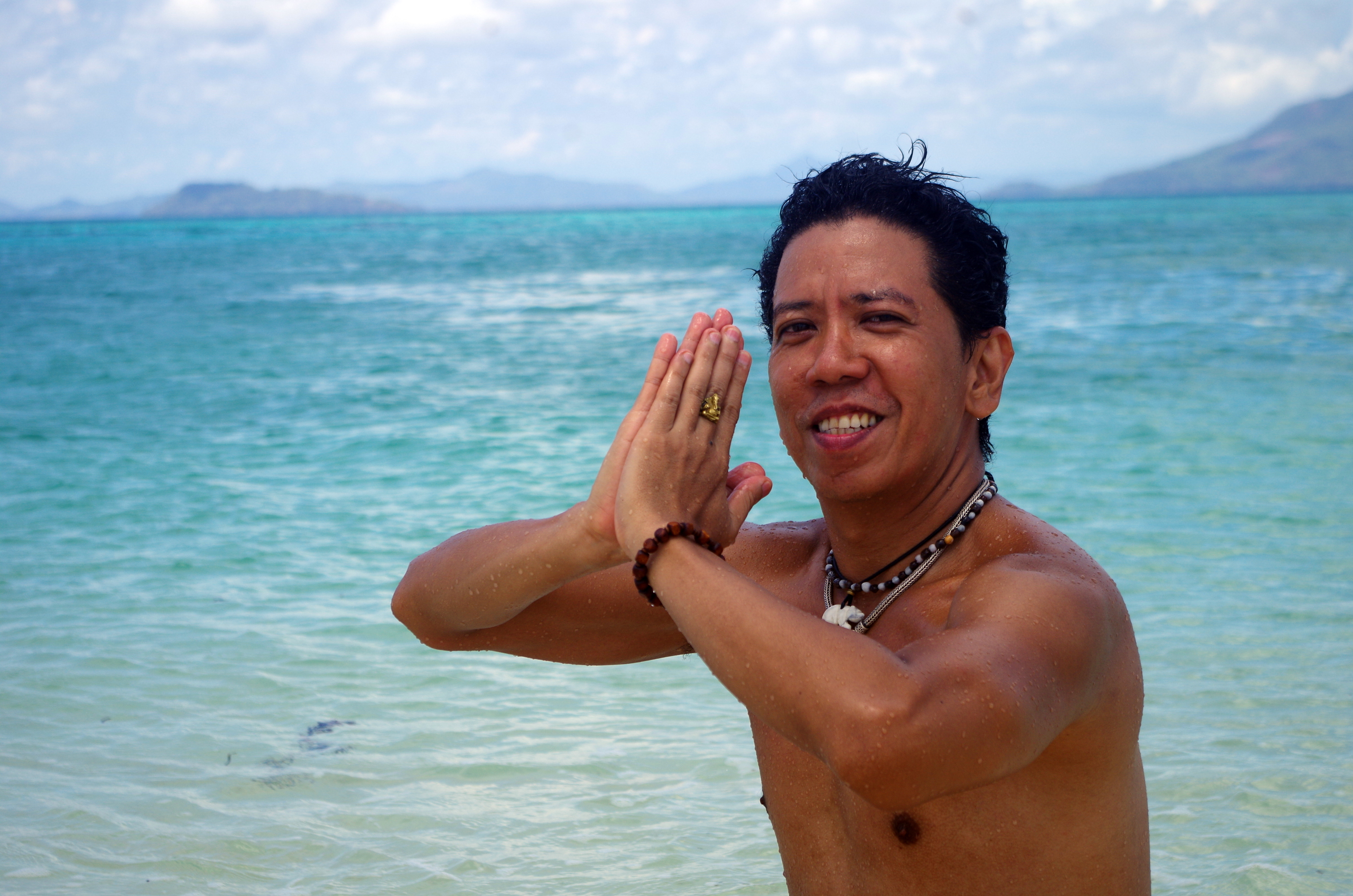
- Solito in 2012
- Born: Manila, Philippines
- Occupations: Director; Writer
- Website: auraeussolito.com

Auraeus Solito, also known as Kanakan-Balintagos, is a Filipino filmmaker and indigenous peoples rights advocate who comes from a lineage of shaman-kings from the Palaw'an tribe. He was one of the first to be born outside of his tribal land of South Palawan. He was born in Manila and, after graduating from the Philippine Science High School, studied theater at the University of the Philippines, where he received a degree in Theater Arts. One of the leading independent filmmakers in the Philippines, he was chosen as part of in Take 100, The Future of Film in 2010. This book, published by Phaidon Press, New York, is a survey featuring 100 emerging film directors from around the world who have been selected by 10 internationally prominent film festival directors.

His first feature film, Ang Pagdadalaga ni Maximo Oliveros (The Blossoming of Maximo Oliveros) won 15 international awards including 3 awards at the Berlinale (The Teddy award, International Jury Prize at the Kinderfest and Special Mention from the Children's Jury of the Kinderfest). It is also the first Philippine film nominated for Best Foreign Film at the Independent Spirit Awards in the US, and has been shown in more than 50 film festivals around the world.

Tuli (Circumcision), his second feature film, won Best Picture and Best Director at the Digital Competition at the 2005 CineManila film festival; won the NETPAC Jury Prize at the Berlinale, International Forum for New Cinema and the Best International Feature Film at Outfest in Los Angeles. Solito is the first Filipino to make it to the Sundance Film Festival in Park City, Utah, USA, two years in a row (with The Blossoming of Maximo Oliveros and Tuli). His films have been screened in other major festivals around the world including Montreal, Busan, Toronto and Rotterdam.

Solito completed a screenplay development program at the Binger Filmlab in Amsterdam.

His film Busong (Palawan Fate) was selected at the Cannes Directors' Fortnight in 2011, and it was awarded Best Director, Best Sound Design, and Best Original Music Score at Cinemalaya 2011. His film Busong was also shown at the 2012 National Geographic All Roads Film Festival in Washington, D.C., where it was awarded Grand Prize, the Merata Mita "Best of Stories" Award.

In 2013 he adopted his tribal-spirit name Kanakan-Balintagos after his uncle, who is a shaman in Palawan, dreamt about him. He said in an interview, "In his dream, he saw me in the middle of a sandbar holding a camera that turned into a blowgun. I became a kanakan … a hunter. Suddenly, great waves appeared from both sides of the sandbar, but I remained unharmed, untouched."

In 2014 his film Esprit de Corps, based on the play he wrote when he was seventeen, won three awards at the Cinema One Originals Film Festival, including Best Director.

In 2015 he was awarded 1st Prize in the prestigious Palanca Awards, Filipino Division, Dulang Ganap Ang Haba (Full Length Play in Filipino), for his literary work Mga Buhay na Apoy.

In 2017, he was one of the recipients of the Outstanding Manilan Award.

Also in 2018, he stated that he has returned to using Kanakan-Balintagos for all of his professional work.

== Filmography ==
=== Full features ===
- 2005: Ang Pagdadalaga ni Maximo Oliveros (The Blossoming of Maximo Oliveros)
- 2005: Tuli (Circumcision)
- 2007: Pisay
- 2009: BoY
- 2011: Busong (Palawan Fate)
- 2012: Baybayin (The Palawan Script)
- 2014: Esprit de Corps

=== Full feature documentary ===
- 2002: Basal Banar (The Sacred Ritual of Truth)

=== Short films ===
- 1995: Ang Maikling Buhay ng Apoy, Act 2, Scene 2: Suring at ang Kuk-ok (The Brief Lifespan of Fire, Act 2, Scene 2: Suring and the Kuk-ok)
- 1998: Impeng Negro (Black Nuisance)
- 2011: 60 Seconds of Solitude in Year Zero (segment)

== Reception ==
The films of Auraeus Solito are extensively discussed in Katrin de Guia's book Kapwa: The Self in the Other, Worldviews and Lifestyles of Filipino Culture-Bearers.

Canadian film scholar Adam Szymanski has positioned Kanakan Balintagos' films within the context of Fourth Cinema and emphasized their affinity with Indigenous political movements which are animated by traditional conceptualizations of healing.
