= Nathan Lopez =

Filipino actor

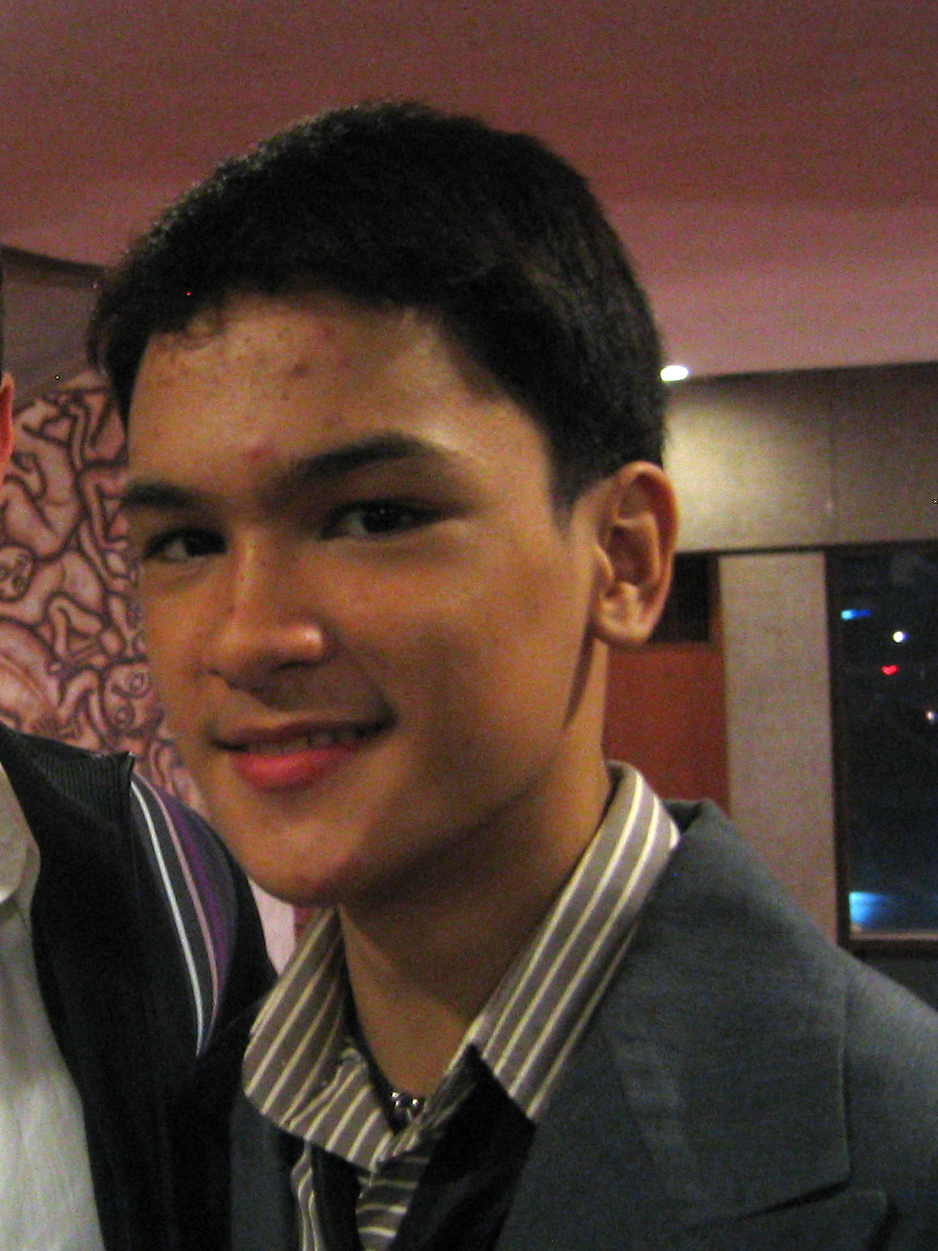
- Lopez in 2006
- Born: Louie Nathanael Buado Lopez; August 19, 1991 (age 33); Manila, Philippines
- Occupation(s): Movie actor, Film actor
- Years active: 2003–present
- Agent: Star Magic (2005-2018)

Nathan Lopez (born Louie Nathanael Buado Lopez, August 19, 1991) is a Filipino actor, who has worked in both film and television productions in the Philippines. He gained international exposure and acclaim as the title character in Ang Pagdadalaga ni Maximo Oliveros (English: The Blossoming of Maximo Oliveros).

== Career ==
At the age of 13, he went with a friend who was auditioning to play Maxi, the central character in Ang Pagdadalaga ni Maximo Oliveros, but was selected by the producer for the part: an openly gay 12-year-old boy who comes from a petty criminal family and falls in love with a handsome policeman. He won 2 awards for the movie, which was also the Philippine nomination as Best Foreign Language Film in the 79th Academy Awards.

In 2007 he was cast in the TV series Sana Maulit Muli (English: I Wish It Could Happen Again), playing Romeo, a gay friend of the central character Jasmine. In the morning TV series entitled Be Careful with My Heart, he played Emman, the gay friend of Maya (played by Jodi Sta. Maria).

He later transferred to GMA Network and took a supporting role in the series The Stepdaughters.

== Filmography ==
=== Television ===
Year	Title	Role
2005	Mga Anghel na Walang Langit	Nato
2007	Sana Maulit Muli	Romeo Bato
2012	Be Careful with My Heart	Emman
2013	Maalaala Mo Kaya	Elmer
2015	Maalaala Mo Kaya	Jupiter
2018	The Stepdaughters	Benson
2018	Dear Uge Episode: Selfie Queen	Witham

=== Movies ===
Year	Title	Role
2005	Ang Pagdadalaga ni Maximo Oliveros	Maximo Oliveros
2006	Xerox	Teenage twin
2007	Tirador	Leo
2008	Krisis	Peter
2008	Teach me to Love	Mark
2014	Children's show	Elmo

==== Awards ====
- 2006 Las Palmas Film Festival: Best Actor for Ang Pagdadalaga ni Maximo Oliveros
- 2005 Cinemalaya Independent Film Festival: Special Citation for Ang Pagdadalaga ni Maximo Oliveros

== Personal life ==
Lopez's mother is a pastor and his father owns a printing business. He has four elder sisters and a twin brother Gamaliel (Gammy) with whom he co-starred in the 2008 film Krisis.

Although he has frequently been cast to play gay characters, Lopez is not gay, and credited his sisters for helping him with his first gay role as Maxi.
