= Ako Legal Wife: Mano Po 4? =

2005 Filipino comedy-drama film

- DVD cover
- Directed by: Joel C. Lamangan
- Written by: Roy C. Iglesias; Lily Y. Monteverde
- Produced by: Roselle Monteverde-Teo
- Starring: Zsa Zsa Padilla; Cherry Pie Picache; Rufa Mae Quinto; Jay Manalo
- Cinematography: Rolly Manuel
- Edited by: Marya Ignacio
- Music by: Vincent De Jesus
- Production company: Regal Multimedia Inc.
- Distributed by: Regal Entertainment
- Release date: December 25, 2005
- Running time: 107 minutes
- Country: Philippines
- Language: Filipino

Ako Legal Wife: Mano Po 4? (Chinese: 合法妻; pinyin: Héfǎ qī; Pe̍h-ōe-jī: Ha̍p-hoat chhe) is a 2005 Filipino comedy-drama film directed by Joel Lamangan from a screenplay by Roy C. Iglesias and Lily Monteverde. The film focuses on the lives of the Chinese-Filipino community, and stars Zsa Zsa Padilla in the title role, Cherry Pie Picache, Rufa Mae Quinto and Jay Manalo. The fourth installment of the Mano Po film series, the film's title was based on the line of Zsa Zsa Padilla in Mano Po 2: My Home: "Ako legal wife!" (lit. 'I legal wife!'). Produced by Regal Entertainment, it was released on December 25, 2005, as an entry to the 2005 Metro Manila Film Festival.

Apart from the other Mano Po films, it is the first film in the series to have pronounced comedic elements.

== Plot ==
Elton Chiong is a philandering businessman with two wives. Chona, a pure Chinese, is his legal wife and the mother of their three children, Hamilton who is a closeted homosexual, and his daughters Hibiscus, and Anthurium. Patty, a Filipino-Chinese with a Visayan accent works as a property developer and is the mother of Nixon. The arrangement leads to Chona and Patty maintaining a low-level competition with each other which reaches comical levels, while agreeing to allot separate periods for each other to be with Elton separately. Despite the conflict, their children acknowledge each other and are on friendly terms.

Chona and Patty gradually notice that Elton is becoming distant to them. At an event attended by the whole family, including Patty's, the two wives are startled when they see Elton arrive with his new mistress Gloria, a younger and more voluptuous woman and a pure Filipino. Worried about the impact of this new competition, Chona and Patty agree to a truce and work together to keep Elton to themselves, with Chona going as far to undergo breast implant surgery and Patty casting a hex on Gloria. While this plays on, Elton arranges for Hamilton, his legitimate heir, to be married to another Chinese-Filipino woman, Trixia. But during a date, Hamilton confesses that he cannot marry her because of his sexuality. To his surprise, Trixia accepts him for what he is and confesses to him that she is in love with Nixon. Hamilton and his siblings, who also know of Hamilton's homosexuality, then help Trixia, whom they become friends with, and Nixon develop a romantic relationship without Elton's knowledge, while confronting Gloria for his affair with Elton.

On the day of Hamilton and Trixia's wedding, Hamilton publicly comes out as gay in church and tells his father that Nixon and Trixia have eloped. As Elton drives off to try and stop Nixon and Trixia, he collides with a truck, landing him in hospital. As Chona, Patty, their children and Gloria visit Elton, they come across a queue of his mistresses whom they had not learned before. Elton survives but is told that the accident has rendered him paralyzed from the waist down and infertile, to his grief. Gloria amicably breaks off her relationship with Elton.

Sometime later, Chona and Patty maintain their rivalry but are now on friendlier terms, while Elton accepts Hamilton's homosexuality as well as Nixon and Tricia's relationship. As they watch their children perform in a band, Chona, Patty and Elton meet again with Gloria and her new romantic partner, an African-American.

== Cast ==
- Jay Manalo as Elton Chiong
- Zsa Zsa Padilla as Chona Gao-Chiong
- Cherry Pie Picache as Patty Que-Chiong
- Rufa Mae Quinto as Gloria Martinez
- JC De Vera as Nixon Chiong
- John Prats as Hamilton Chiong
- Julianne Lee as Hibiscus Chiong
- Ella Guevara as Anthurium Chiong
- Bianca King as Trixia Sy
- Pinky Amador as Elvie Rosales-Tan
- Marissa Sanchez as Nancy Dy
- Harvey Diez as Benito Co

== Production ==
For this film, Lily Monteverde hired Joel Lamangan to direct. She had to come to the set to explain to him the different rituals and distinctions of Chinese culture in the Philippines. Jay Manalo returned to the series once again to portray a different character as he had done in previous films in the series.

== Release ==
Ako Legal Wife: Mano Po 4? was among eight films produced by Lily Monteverde that premiered at the 2005 Metro Manila Film Festival on December 25, 2023.

On October 15, 2021, Ako Legal Wife: Mano Po 4? was released on Netflix alongside the first three films in the series.

== Accolades ==
At the 2005 Metro Manila Film Festival, Padilla took the award for Best Actress and Picache won the award for Best Supporting Actress.
