= Gawad Urian for Best Film =

Filipino award for film of the year

- Awarded for: Best Picture of the Year
- Country: Philippines
- Presented by: Manunuri ng Pelikulang Pilipino
- First award: 1977
- Currently held by: Bloom Where You Are Planted (2026)
- Website: http://www.manunuripelikula.com

The Gawad Urian for Best Film (officially, the Pinakamahusay na Pelikula) is an award given by the Manunuri ng Pelikulang Pilipino (Filipino Film Critics) to the best Filipino film of the year.

== Winners and nominees ==
=== 1970s ===
| Year | Film | Director | Producer(s) |
|---|---|---|---|
| 1977 (1st) | Ganito Kami Noon, Paano Kayo Ngayon | Eddie Romero | Hemisphere Pictures |
| 1977 (1st) | Insiang | Lino Brocka | Cinemanila Corporation |
| 1977 (1st) | Itim | Mike de Leon | Cinema Artists |
| 1977 (1st) | Minsa'y Isang Gamu-gamo | Lupita Aquino-Kashiwahara | Premiere Productions |
| 1977 (1st) | Nunal sa Tubig | Ishmael Bernal | Crown Seven Film Productions |
| 1978 (2nd) | Hubad na Bayani | Robert Arevalo | Rainbow Productions |
| 1978 (2nd) | Banta ng Kahapon | Eddie Romero | Hemisphere Pictures |
| 1978 (2nd) | Burlesk Queen | Celso Ad. Castillo | Ian Films |
| 1978 (2nd) | Dalawang Pugad, Isang Ibon | Ishmael Bernal | Lea Productions |
| 1978 (2nd) | Kung Mangarap Ka't Magising | Mike de Leon | LVN Pictures |
| 1978 (2nd) | Tahan na Empoy, Tahan | Lino Brocka | Lotus Films |
| 1979 (3rd) | Pagputi ng Uwak, Pag-Itim ng Tagak | Celso Ad. Castillo | VS Films |
| 1979 (3rd) | Hindi sa Iyo Ang Mundo, Baby Porcuna | Danny Zialcita | Mirick Films International & JV Productions |
| 1979 (3rd) | Ikaw ay Akin | Ishmael Bernal | Tagalog Ilang-Ilang Productions |

=== 1980s ===
| Year | Film | Director | Producer(s) |
|---|---|---|---|
| 1980 (4th) | Jaguar | Lino Brocka | Bancom Audiovision Corporation |
| 1980 (4th) | Aliw | Ishmael Bernal | Seven Star Productions |
| 1980 (4th) | Ikaw at ang Gabi | Danny Zialcita | Diosa Productions |
| 1981 (5th) | City After Dark | Ishmael Bernal | Regal Entertainment |
| 1981 (5th) | Aguila | Eddie Romero | Bancom Audiovision Corporation |
| 1981 (5th) | Bona | Lino Brocka | NV Productions |
| 1981 (5th) | Brutal | Marilou Diaz-Abaya | Bancom Audiovision Corporation |
| 1981 (5th) | Kakabakaba Ka Ba? | Mike de Leon | LVN Pictures |
| 1982 (6th) | Salome | Laurice Guillen | Armida Siguion-Reyna & Bancom Audiovision Corporation |
| 1982 (6th) | Kisapmata | Mike de Leon | Simon Ongpin, Ma. Rosario N. Santos & Bancom Audiovision Corporation |
| 1982 (6th) | Pepeng Shotgun | Romy Suzara | Danilo Datu & Sining Silangan Productions |
| 1982 (6th) | Playgirl | Mel Chionglo | Lily Monteverde & Regal Entertainment |
| 1983 (7th) | Oro, Plata, Mata | Peque Gallaga | Experimental Cinema of the Philippines |
| 1983 (7th) | Batch '81 | Mike de Leon | MVP Pictures |
| 1983 (7th) | Himala | Ishmael Bernal | Experimental Cinema of the Philippines |
| 1983 (7th) | Moral | Marilou Diaz-Abaya | Seven Stars Productions |
| 1983 (7th) | Relasyon | Ishmael Bernal | Regal Entertainment |
| 1984 (8th) | Broken Marriage | Ishmael Bernal | Regal Entertainment |
| 1984 (8th) | Karnal | Marilou Diaz-Abaya | Cine Suerte |
| 1985 (9th) | Sister Stella L. | Mike de Leon | Regal Entertainment |
| 1985 (9th) | Bulaklak sa City Jail | Mario O'Hara | Cherubim Films |
| 1985 (9th) | 'Merika | Gil Portes | Adrian Films |
| 1985 (9th) | Sinner or Saint | Mel Chionglo | Regal Entertainment |
| 1986 (10th) | Bayan Ko: Kapit sa Patalim | Lino Brocka | Malaya Films & Stephan Films |
| 1986 (10th) | Hinugot sa Langit | Ishmael Bernal | Regal Entertainment |
| 1986 (10th) | Miguelito: Ang Batang Rebelde | Lino Brocka | D'Wonder Films |
| 1986 (10th) | Paradise Inn | Celso Ad. Castillo | Amazaldy Film Productions |
| 1986 (10th) | Virgin Forest | Peque Gallaga | Regal Entertainment |
| 1987 (11th) | Takaw Tukso | William Pascual | Ultravision Films |
| 1987 (11th) | Bagong Hari | Mario O'Hara | CineVentures |
| 1987 (11th) | Unfaithful Wife | Peque Gallaga | Regal Entertainment |
| 1989 (12th) | Itanong Mo sa Buwan | Chito S. Roño | Double M Productions |
| 1989 (12th) | Anak ng Cabron | Willy Milan | Urban Films |
| 1989 (12th) | Kapag Napagod ang Puso | Maryo J. de los Reyes | VH Films |
| 1989 (12th) | Misis Mo, Misis Ko | Carlos Siguion-Reyna | Viva Films |

=== 1990s ===
| Year | Film | Director | Producer(s) |
|---|---|---|---|
| 1990 (13th) | Pahiram ng Isang Umaga | Ishmael Bernal | Regal Entertainment |
| 1990 (13th) | Ang Pumatay ng Dahil Sa Iyo | Willy Milan | Viva Films |
| 1990 (13th) | Bilangin ang Bituin sa Langit | Elwood Perez | Regal Entertainment |
| 1990 (13th) | Joe Pring: Homicide Manila Police | Augusto Salvador | 4-N Films |
| 1990 (13th) | Macho Dancer | Lino Brocka | Special People Productions |
| 1991 (14th) | Gumapang Ka Sa Lusak | Lino Brocka | Viva Films |
| 1991 (14th) | Andrea, Paano Ba ang Maging Isang Ina? | Gil Portes | MRN Films |
| 1991 (14th) | Kapag Langit ang Humatol | Laurice Guillen | Vision Films |
| 1991 (14th) | My Other Woman | Maryo J. de los Reyes | Regal Entertainment |
| 1992 (15th) | Ipagpatawad Mo | Laurice Guillen | Viva Films |
| 1992 (15th) | Hihintayin Kita sa Langit | Carlos Siguion-Reyna | Reyna Films |
| 1992 (15th) | Sa Kabila ng Lahat | Lino Brocka | Viva Films |
| 1993 (16th) | Ikaw Pa Lang ang Minahal | Carlos Siguion-Reyna | Reyna Films |
| 1993 (16th) | Ikaw ang Lahat sa Akin | Jose Javier Reyes | Regal Entertainment |
| 1994 (17th) | Makati Ave. Office Girls | Jose Javier Reyes | Regal Entertainment |
| 1994 (17th) | Dahil Mahal Kita (The Dolzura Cortez Story) | Laurice Guillen | OctoArts Films |
| 1994 (17th) | May Minamahal | Jose Javier Reyes | Star Cinema |
| 1994 (17th) | Sakay | Raymond Red | Alpha Omega Productions |
| 1995 (18th) | The Fatima Buen Story | Mario O'Hara | Regal Entertainment |
| 1995 (18th) | The Secrets of Sarah Jane Salazar | Maryo J. de los Reyes | Regal Entertainment |
| 1995 (18th) | Wating | Ishmael Bernal | MAQ Films |
| 1996 (19th) | Sana Maulit Muli | Olivia Lamasan | Star Cinema |
| 1996 (19th) | Bagong Bayani (OCW) | Tikoy Aguiluz | Dark Horse Pictures |
| 1996 (19th) | Ipaglaban Mo: The Movie | Marilou Diaz-Abaya | Star Cinema |
| 1996 (19th) | Pare Ko | Jose Javier Reyes | Star Cinema |
| 1996 (19th) | Sa Ngalan ng Pag-ibig | Maryo J. de los Reyes | Regal Entertainment |
| 1996 (19th) | The Flor Contemplacion Story | Joel Lamangan | Viva Films |
| 1997 (20th) | Segurista | Tikoy Aguiluz | Neo Films |
| 1997 (20th) | Bakit May Kahapon Pa? | Joel Lamangan | Viva Films & IAM Productions |
| 1997 (20th) | Istokwa | Chito Roño | MAQ Films |
| 1997 (20th) | Madrasta | Olivia Lamasan | Star Cinema |
| 1997 (20th) | Mulanay: Sa Pusod ng Paraiso | Gil Portes | Teamwork Productions |
| 1997 (20th) | Radio Romance | Jose Javier Reyes | Star Cinema |
| 1998 (21st) | Milagros | Marilou Diaz-Abaya | Merdeka Films |
| 1998 (21st) | Batang PX | Jose Javier Reyes | Star Cinema & Available Light Production |
| 1998 (21st) | Damong Ligaw | Jose Mari Avellana | Premiere Productions |
| 1998 (21st) | Ligaya ang Itawag Mo sa Akin | Carlos Siguion-Reyna | Reyna Films |
| 1998 (21st) | Minsan Lamang Magmamahal | Jose Javier Reyes | MAQ Films & Available Light Production |
| 1998 (21st) | Nang Iniwan Mo Ako | Jose Javier Reyes | Viva Films & Available Light Production |
| 1999 (22nd) | Bata, Bata… Pa'no Ka Ginawa? | Chito Roño | Star Cinema |
| 1999 (22nd) | Jose Rizal | Marilou Diaz-Abaya | GMA Films |
| 1999 (22nd) | Sana Pag-ibig Na | Jeffrey Jeturian | Good Harvest Productions |
| 1999 (22nd) | Sa Pusod ng Dagat | Marilou Diaz-Abaya | GMA Films |
| 1999 (22nd) | Serafin Geronimo: Ang Kriminal ng Baryo Concepcion | Lav Diaz | Good Harvest Productions |

=== 2000s ===
| Year | Film | Director | Producer(s) |
|---|---|---|---|
| 2000 (23rd) | Bayaning 3rd World | Mike de Leon | Cinema Artists |
| 2000 (23rd) | Bulaklak ng Maynila | Joel Lamangan | Viva Films |
| 2000 (23rd) | Pila Balde | Jeffrey Jeturian | Good Harvest Productions & Regal Entertainment |
| 2000 (23rd) | Saranggola | Gil Portes | Teamwork Productions & GMA Films |
| 2001 (24th) | Tuhog | Jeffrey Jeturian | Regal Entertainment |
| 2001 (24th) | Deathrow | Joel Lamangan | GMA Films |
| 2001 (24th) | Laro sa Baga | Chito Roño | Regal Entertainment |
| 2001 (24th) | Tanging Yaman | Laurice Guillen | Star Cinema |
| 2002 (25th) | Batang West Side | Lav Diaz | JMCN Productions & Hinabing Pangarap |
| 2002 (25th) | Hubog | Joel Lamangan | Good Harvest Productions |
| 2002 (25th) | La Vida Rosa | Chito Roño | Star Cinema |
| 2002 (25th) | Live Show | Jose Javier Reyes | Regal Entertainment & Available Light Productions |
| 2002 (25th) | Minsan May Isang Puso | Jose Javier Reyes | Regal Entertainment |
| 2003 (26th) | Dekada '70 | Chito Roño | Star Cinema |
| 2003 (26th) | Mga Munting Tinig | Gil Portes | College Assurance Plan & Teamwork Productions |
| 2003 (26th) | Laman | Maryo J. de los Reyes | Regal Entertainment |
| 2003 (26th) | Mano Po | Joel Lamangan | Regal Entertainment |
| 2004 (27th) | Babae sa Breakwater | Mario O'Hara | Entertainment Warehouse |
| 2004 (27th) | Magnifico | Maryo J. de los Reyes | Star Cinema |
| 2004 (27th) | Bridal Shower | Jeffrey Jeturian | Seiko Films |
| 2004 (27th) | Crying Ladies | Mark Meily | Unitel Pictures |
| 2005 (28th) | Ebolusyon ng Isang Pamilyang Pilipino | Lav Diaz | Sine Olivia Pilipinas, Paul Tanedo Inc., & Ebolusyon Productions |
| 2005 (28th) | Panaghoy sa Suba | Cesar Montano | CM Films |
| 2005 (28th) | Milan | Olivia Lamasan | Star Cinema |
| 2005 (28th) | Sabel | Joel Lamangan | Regal Entertainment |
| 2006 (29th) | Ang Pagdadalaga ni Maximo Oliveros | Auraeus Solito | Cinemalaya Foundation & UFO Pictures |
| 2006 (29th) | Ala Verde, Ala Pobre | Briccio Santos | Muchachos Bravos Filmworks |
| 2006 (29th) | Ang Daan Patungong Kalimugtong | Mes De Guzman | Sampaybakod Productions & Cinelarga |
| 2006 (29th) | Big Time | Mario Cornejo | Cinemalaya, Arkeo Films, & Blue Water |
| 2006 (29th) | Blue Moon | Joel Lamangan | Regal Entertainment |
| 2006 (29th) | La Visa Loca | Mark Meily | Unitel Pictures |
| 2007 (30th) | Kubrador | Jeffrey Jeturian | MLR Films |
| 2007 (30th) | Huling Balyan ng Buhi | Sherad Anthony Sanchez | Cinema One Originals, Salida Davao, Alchemy of Vision and Light, Loyola Film Circle & the North Cotabato Provincial Government |
| 2007 (30th) | Kaleldo | Brillante Mendoza | Centerstage Productions & G-Entertainment |
| 2007 (30th) | Kasal, Kasali, Kasalo | Jose Javier Reyes | Star Cinema |
| 2007 (30th) | Rome and Juliet | Connie Macatuno | Cinema One Originals & I.O.U. One Productions |
| 2007 (30th) | Todo Todo Teros | John Torres | Peliculas Los Otros |
| 2008 (31st) | Tirador | Brillante Mendoza | Centerstage Productions, Rollingball Entertainment & Ignite Media |
| 2008 (31st) | Confessional | Ruel Dahis Antipuesto & Jerrold Tarog | Creative Programs, Cinema One Originals & Oddfield Productions |
| 2008 (31st) | Death in the Land of Encantos | Lav Diaz | Sine Olivia Pilipinas & Hubert Bals Fund |
| 2008 (31st) | Endo | Jade Castro | UFO Pictures |
| 2008 (31st) | John John | Brillante Mendoza | Seiko Films & Centerstage Productions |
| 2008 (31st) | Tribu | Jim Libiran | Cinemalaya Foundation & 8 Glasses Productions |
| 2009 (32nd) | Serbis | Brillante Mendoza | Centerstage Productions |
| 2009 (32nd) | Boses | Ellen Ongkeko-Marfil | Casa San Miguel, Cinemalaya Foundation & Council for the Welfare of Children |
| 2009 (32nd) | Hunghong sa Yuta | Arnel Mardoquio | Brothers of the Sacred Heart Youth Ministry |
| 2009 (32nd) | Imburnal | Sherad Anthony Sanchez | Cinema One Originals & Creative Programs |
| 2009 (32nd) | Jay | Francis Xavier Pasion | Cinemalaya Foundation, National Commission for Culture and the Arts & Pasion Para Pelicula Productions |
| 2009 (32nd) | Melancholia | Lav Diaz | Sine Olivia Pilipinas |
| 2009 (32nd) | Yanggaw | Richard Somes | Cinema One Originals, Reality Entertainment, Larger Than Life & Creative Programs |

=== 2010s ===
| Year | Film | Director | Producer(s) |
|---|---|---|---|
| 2010 (33rd) | Kinatay | Brillante Mendoza | Swift Productions & Centerstage Productions |
| 2010 (33rd) | Ang Panggagahasa kay Fe | Alvin Yapan | Cinemalaya Foundation, Vim Yapan/Alem Chua Productions, Ateneo Institute of Literary Arts and Practices, Women's Crisis Center & International Labour Organization |
| 2010 (33rd) | Bakal Boys | Ralston Jover | Apogee Production & Queen Bessie, LLC |
| 2010 (33rd) | Colorum | Jobin Ballesteros | Cinemalaya Foundation, Wild Coyote Pictures & Solito Arts Productions |
| 2010 (33rd) | Engkwentro | Pepe Diokno | Cinemalaya Foundation |
| 2010 (33rd) | Himpapawid | Raymond Red | Filmex Productions, Ignite Media, Pacific Film Partners, PelikulaRed, Pelipula Productions & Butch Jimenez |
| 2010 (33rd) | Hospital Boat | Arnel Mardoquio | Alchemy of Vision and Light, Hyde Out Entertainment, National Commission for Culture and the Arts & Skyweaver Productions |
| 2010 (33rd) | Last Supper No. 3 | Veronica Velasco | Cinemalaya Foundation, Beinte Singko Mil Productions, Veronica Velasco, Pablo Biglang-awa, Jr. & John Silva |
| 2010 (33rd) | Lola | Brillante Mendoza | Swift Productions & Centerstage Productions |
| 2010 (33rd) | The Arrival | Erik Matti | Erik Matti |
| 2011 (34th) | Ang Damgo ni Eleuteria | Remton Siega Zuasola | Cinema One Originals & Panumduman Pictures |
| 2011 (34th) | Amigo | John Sayles | Anarchists’ Convention Films & Pinoy Pictures |
| 2011 (34th) | Ang Mundo sa Panahon ng Yelo | Mes De Guzman | Sampaybakod Productions |
| 2011 (34th) | Chassis | Adolfo Alix Jr. | Happy Gilmore Productions |
| 2011 (34th) | Halaw | Sheron R. Dayoc | Cinemalaya Foundation & Los Peliculas Linterna Studio |
| 2011 (34th) | Limbunan | Gutierrez Mangansakan II | Bidadali House Productions & Cinemalaya Foundation |
| 2011 (34th) | Noy | Rodel Nacianceno & Dondon Santos | Cinemedia Films, VIP Access Media Productions & Star Cinema |
| 2011 (34th) | Sheika | Arnel Mardoquio | Sine Mindanaw, Skyweaver Productions, Hyde Out Entertainment & Alchemy of Vision and Light |
| 2011 (34th) | Tsardyer | Sigfreid Barros Sanchez | Creative Programs & Lasponggols Collective |
| 2012 (35th) | Ang Sayaw ng Dalawang Kaliwang Paa | Alvin Yapan | Cinemalaya Foundation, Vim Yapan/Alem Chua Productions, Big Top Media Productions, SQ Film Laboratories, Optima Digital & Far Eastern University |
| 2012 (35th) | Amok | Lawrence Fajardo | Cinemalaya Foundation, Pelikulaw & Wild Coyote Pictures |
| 2012 (35th) | Ang Babae sa Septic Tank | Marlon Rivera | Cinemalaya Foundation, Martinez Rivera Films, Quantum Films & Straight Shooters Media |
| 2012 (35th) | Bisperas | Jeffrey Jeturian | Cinemalaya Foundation, Quantum Films and HongKong-Asia Films Financing Forum |
| 2012 (35th) | Boundary | Benito Bautista | Bigtop, Optima Digital, Voyage Studios & Wanderlustproject Films |
| 2012 (35th) | Busong | Auraeus Solito | Cinemalaya Foundation, Solito Arts, Alternative Vision Cinema & Voyage Studios |
| 2012 (35th) | Ka Oryang | Sari Raissa Lluch Dalena | Cinema One Originals, Kino Arts & Optima Digital |
| 2012 (35th) | Niño | Loy Arcenas | Cinemalaya Foundation & Handurawan Films |
| 2012 (35th) | Six Degrees of Separation from Lilia Cuntapay | Antoinette Jadaone | Cinema One Originals & Post Manila |
| 2012 (35th) | The Natural Phenomenon of Madness | Charliebebs Gohetia | The Grit Project, Outpost Visual Frontier & Noel D. Ferrer Productions |
| 2013 (36th) | Ang Paglalakbay ng mga Bituin sa Gabing Madilim | Arnel Mardoquio | Cinema One Originals, Skyweaver Productions, Red Motion Media, HYDEntertainment, Alchemy of Vision and Light & Conrad Cejoco |
| 2013 (36th) | Baybayin | Auraeus Solito | Cinema One Originals, Solito Arts & HUBO Productions |
| 2013 (36th) | Bwakaw | Jun Lana | Cinemalaya Foundation, Octobertrain Films, APT Entertainment, Antonio P. Tuviera, Ferdinand Lapuz, Ramel David, Joselito Oconer, Michael Tuviera, Perci Intalan & Jun Lana |
| 2013 (36th) | Colossal | Whammy Alcazaren | Attack Cinema, Crimson Light Productions, Joenathann Alandy & Paulo Alcazaren |
| 2013 (36th) | Diablo | Mes De Guzman | Cinemalaya Foundation, Sampaybakod Productions, Cinelarga, Colorista, Mes De Guzman, Rhea Operaña-De Guzman & Gay Ace Domingo |
| 2013 (36th) | Florentina Hubaldo, CTE | Lav Diaz | Lav Diaz & Sine Olivia Pilipinas |
| 2013 (36th) | Mater Dolorosa | Adolfo Alix Jr. | Cinema One Originals, Phoenix Pictures & Maan Dimla |
| 2013 (36th) | Oros | Paul Sta. Ana | Cinemalaya Foundation, Phainomena Pictures, Zapixel, Joey Abacan & Paul Sta. Ana |
| 2013 (36th) | Posas | Lawrence Fajardo | Cinemalaya Foundation, Quantum Films, Joji Alonso, Armando Lao & John Victor Tence |
| 2013 (36th) | Thy Womb | Brillante Mendoza | Centerstage Productions, Film Development Council of the Philippines, Larry Castillo, Melvin Mangada, Brillante Mendoza & Jaime Santiago |
| 2014 (37th) | Norte, Hangganan ng Kasaysayan | Lav Diaz | Wacky O Productions, Kayan Productions & Origin8 Media |
| 2014 (37th) | Ang Mga Tigmoo sa Akong Pagpauli | Arnel Mardoquio | Cinema One Originals, Skyweaver Productions, BordWerkz Productions, HYDEntertainment, Red Motion Media, the Local Government of Nabunturan, Compostela Valley & Voyage Studios |
| 2014 (37th) | Ang Kwento Ni Mabuti | Mes De Guzman | Cinelarga, Sampaybakod Productions, PLDT-Smart Foundation, Studio 5 & Unitel Entertainment |
| 2014 (37th) | Badil | Chito Roño | Film Development Council of the Philippines & Waray Republik |
| 2014 (37th) | Dukit | Armando Lao | Centerstage Productions & Betis Galleria |
| 2014 (37th) | Ekstra | Jeffrey Jeturain | Cinemalaya Foundation & Quantum Films |
| 2014 (37th) | On the Job | Erik Matti | Star Cinema, Reality Entertainment & XYZ Films |
| 2014 (37th) | Porno | Adolfo Alix Jr. | Phoenix Features, CMB Film Services & Cinemalaya Foundation |
| 2014 (37th) | Transit | | Cinemalaya Foundation & TEN17P |
| 2015 (38th) | Mula sa Kung Ano ang Noon | Lav Diaz | Sine Olivia Pilipinas |
| 2015 (38th) | Barber's Tales | Jun Lana | APT Entertainment & Octobertrain Films |
| 2015 (38th) | Bwaya | Francis Xavier Pasion | Cinemalaya Foundation, FrontRow International, Eight Films & Source of Light Films |
| 2015 (38th) | Dagitab | Giancarlo Abrahan | Cinemalaya Foundation & TEN17P |
| 2016 (39th) | Taklub | Brillante Mendoza | Centerstage Productions |
| 2016 (39th) | Anino sa Likod ng Buwan | Jun Lana | Octobertrain Films & The IdeaFirst Company |
| 2016 (39th) | Ari: My Life with a King | Carlo Catu | Holy Angel University Center for Kapampangan Studies |
| 2016 (39th) | Bambanti | Zig Madamba Dulay | Solar Entertainment, Centerstage Productions, Sinag Maynila, the Local Government of the Municipality of Luna, Isabela & the Province of Isabela |
| 2016 (39th) | Da Dog Show | Ralston Jover | Queen B Productions & san Cinema |
| 2016 (39th) | Heneral Luna | Jerrold Tarog | TBA Studios & Artikulo Uno Productions |
| 2016 (39th) | Honor Thy Father | Erik Matti | Reality Entertainment |
| 2016 (39th) | Imbisibol | Lawrence Fajardo | Sinag Maynila & Solar Entertainment |
| 2017 (40th) | Women of the Weeping River | Sheron Dayoc | TBA Studios, Waterland Film, Artikulo Uno Productions, Buchi Boy Films, Hauslesmains, Mogador Film, Southern Lantern Studios, Tuko Film Productions & QCinema |
| 2017 (40th) | Ang Babaeng Humayo | Lav Diaz | Cinema One Originals & Sine Olivia Pilipinas |
| 2017 (40th) | Baboy Halas | Bagane Fiola | QCinema & Origane Films |
| 2017 (40th) | Ma' Rosa | Brillante Mendoza | Centerstage Productions |
| 2017 (40th) | Paglipay | Zig Madamba Dulay | ZMD Productions, keep me posted inc., ToFarm & Universal Harvester |
| 2017 (40th) | Pamilya Ordinaryo | Eduardo Roy Jr. | Cinemalaya Foundation, Found Films & Outpost Productions |
| 2018 (41st) | Balangiga: Howling Wilderness | Khavn | QCinema & Kamias Overground |
| 2018 (41st) | Birdshot | Mikhail Red | PelikulaRed, TBA Studios, Tuko Film Productions & Buchi Boy Films |
| 2018 (41st) | Bhoy Intsik | Joel Lamangan | Frontrow Entertainment |
| 2018 (41st) | The Chanters | James Robin Mayo | ZMD Productions, keep me posted inc. & ToFarm |
| 2018 (41st) | Respeto | Treb Monteras II | Cinemalaya Foundation, Found Films & Outpost Productions |
| 2018 (41st) | Tu Pug Imatuy (The Right to Kill) | Arnel Barbarona | Red Motion Media |
| 2019 (42nd) | BuyBust | Erik Matti | Reality Entertainment & Viva Films |
| 2019 (42nd) | A Short History of a Few Bad Things | Keith Deligero | Cinema One Originals & Deligero & Co. |
| 2019 (42nd) | Ang Panahon ng Halimaw | Lav Diaz | Epicmedia, Sine Olivia Pilipinas & Globe Studios |
| 2019 (42nd) | ML | Benedict Mique | Cinemalaya Foundation & Lonewolf Films |
| 2019 (42nd) | Signal Rock | Chito Roño | CSR Productions & Regal Films |

=== 2020s ===
| Year | Film | Director | Producer(s) |
|---|---|---|---|
| 2020 (43rd) | Babae at Baril | Rae Red | Cignal Entertainment, Epicmedia & QCinema |
| 2020 (43rd) | Ang Hupa | Lav Diaz | Sine Olivia Pilipinas & Spring Films |
| 2020 (43rd) | Cleaners | Glenn Barit | Dambuhala Productions & QCinema |
| 2020 (43rd) | Edward | Thop Nazareno | Cinemalaya Foundation, Awkward Penguin, Outpost Digital Frontier & Viva Films |
| 2020 (43rd) | Huwebes, Huwebes | Don Gerardo Frasco, Kristoffer Villarino & Januar Yap | Binisaya |
| 2020 (43rd) | John Denver Trending | Arden Rod Condez | Cinemalaya Foundation, What If Films Philippines, Southern Lantern Pictures, Outpost Visual Frontier & Tinker Bulb Productions |
| 2020 (43rd) | Kalel, 15 | Jun Lana | The IdeaFirst Company, Octobertrain Films & Cignal Entertainment |
| 2020 (43rd) | Metamorphosis | J. E. Tiglao | Cinema One Originals & Rebelde Films |
| 2021 (44th) | Aswang | Alyx Ayn Arumpac | Cinematografica, Les Productions de l'Oeil Sauvage, Razor Film Produktion GmbH & Stray Dog Productions |
| 2021 (44th) | Hayop Ka! | Avid Liongoren | Rocketsheep Studio & Spring Films |
| 2021 (44th) | Kintsugi | Lawrence Fajardo | Pelikulaw & Solar Pictures |
| 2021 (44th) | Lahi, Hayop | Lav Diaz | Sine Olivia Pilipinas |
| 2021 (44th) | Midnight in a Perfect World | Dodo Dayao | Globe Studios & Epicmedia |
| 2021 (44th) | A Thousand Cuts | Ramona Diaz | CineDiaz & Concordia Studio |
| 2021 (44th) | Watch List | Ben Rekhi | BRON Studios, Reality Entertainment & State of Awe |
| 2022 (45th) | On the Job: The Missing 8 | Erik Matti | Reality Entertainment & XYZ Films |
| 2022 (45th) | Big Night! | Jun Lana | Cignal Entertainment, Octobertrain Films, Quantum Films & The IdeaFirst Company |
| 2022 (45th) | Historya ni Ha | Lav Diaz | Sine Olivia Pilipinas |
| 2022 (45th) | Kun Maupay Man It Panahon | Carlo Francisco Manatad | Cinematografica, planc, Quantum Films, House on Fire, Dreamscape Entertainment, Globe Studios, Blacksheep, Aand Company KawanKawan Media & Weydemann Bros. |
| 2022 (45th) | Walang Kasarian ang Digmaang Bayan | Joselito Altarejos | 2076Kolektib & Likhang Silangan Entertainment |
| 2023 (46th) | Kapag Wala Nang Mga Alon | Lav Diaz | Sine Olivia Pilipinas, Epicmedia Productions & Films Boutique |
| 2023 (46th) | Blue Room | Ma-an L. Asuncion-Dagnalan | Cinemalaya Foundation, CreatePH Films & EyePoppers Multimedia Services |
| 2023 (46th) | Leonor Will Never Die | Martika Ramirez Escobar | Arkeofilms, ANIMA & Purin Pictures |
| 2023 (46th) | 12 Weeks | Anna Isabelle Matutina | Cinemalaya Foundation |
| 2024 (47th) | Iti Mapukpukaw | Carl Joseph Papa | Cinemalaya Foundation, Project 8 Projects & GMA Public Affairs |
| 2024 (47th) | About Us But Not About Us | Jun Lana | Octobertrain Films, The IdeaFirst Company & Quantum Films |
| 2024 (47th) | Ang Duyan ng Magiting | Dustin Celestino | Sine Metu |
| 2024 (47th) | Firefly | Zig Madamba Dulay | GMA Pictures & GMA Public Affairs |
| 2024 (47th) | GomBurZa | Pepe Diokno | JesCom Films, Jesuit Communications Foundation & MQuest Ventures |
| 2024 (47th) | Third World Romance | Dwein Baltazar | Black Sheep |
| 2025 (48th) | Alipato at Muog | JL Burgos | Cinemalaya Foundation |
| 2025 (48th) | Green Bones | Zig Madamba Dulay | GMA Pictures, GMA Public Affairs & Brightburn Entertainment |
| 2025 (48th) | Kono Basho | Jaime Pacena II | Project 8 Projects |
| 2025 (48th) | Phantosmia | Lav Diaz | Ten17P & Sine Olivia Pilipinas |
| 2025 (48th) | Rizal's Makamisa: Pantasma ng Higanti | Khavn | Kamias Overground & Rapid Eye Movies |
| 2025 (48th) | The Hearing | Lawrence Fajardo | Cinemalaya Foundation |
| 2025 (48th) | Tumandok | Arlie Sweet Sumagaysay & Richard Jeroui Salvadico | Southern Lantern Studios |
| 2026 (49th) | Bloom Where You Are Planted | Noni Abao | Alex Poblete, Taripnong Cagayan Valley |
| 2026 (49th) | Bar Boys: After School | Kip Oebanda | 901 Studios |
| 2026 (49th) | Cinemartyrs | Sari Dalena | Kino Arts |
| 2026 (49th) | Quezon | Jerrold Tarog | TBA Studios |
| 2026 (49th) | Sunshine | Antoinette Jadaone | ANIMA, Cloud Duck Pictures, Happy Infinite Productions, Project 8 Projects |
