= Carlos Siguion-Reyna =

Filipino director and actor (born 1957)

- Born: Carlitos Siguion-Reyna; 4 November 1957 (age 68); Manila, Philippines
- Education: Ateneo de Manila University (BA); NYU Tisch School of the Arts (MFA)
- Occupations: Director; Actor; Producer
- Years active: 1975–present
- Spouse: Bibeth Orteza (m. 1986)
- Children: 2
- Parents: Armida Siguion-Reyna; Leonardo Siguion-Reyna

Carlitos Siguion-Reyna (born 4 November 1957), known professionally as Carlos Siguion-Reyna, is a Filipino director, actor, and producer for film and television. He is the son of actress, singer, and producer Armida Siguion-Reyna, and is married to screenwriter Bibeth Orteza.

== Early life ==
Carlitos was born on 4 November 1957, and he is the fourth (Note: Apart from Monique (born 1954) and Dodie (Leonardo Junior; born 1955), Carlos had a stillborn older brother named "Telesforo" (nicknamed Fory) in 1952. It is attributed to this reference:) and youngest child of Armida Ponce-Enrile, with whom he shared her birthday, and Leonardo Siguion-Reyna.

When he was a child, he wanted to become a cook before deciding to study filmmaking at Tisch.

== Career ==
In 1988, he directed his first feature film, Misis Mo, Misis Ko, from a story and screenplay by his wife, and his mother co-produced the film with Vic R. Del Rosario Jr., the founder and executive producer of Viva Films. The critical and financial success of his directorial debut led them to form Reyna Films in 1990, with the film Hihintayin Kita sa Langit, a film loosely based on Emily Brontë's novel Wuthering Heights and starring Richard Gomez and Dawn Zulueta, as its first offering in 1991.

After the release of Azucena in 2000, he stopped making feature films and began focusing on making videos for various organizations and advocacy groups, and became a faculty member at NYU Tisch School of the Arts' Singapore campus from 2008 to 2015.

== Personal life ==
Carlos earned his degrees in Bachelor of Arts in Interdisciplinary Studies from Ateneo de Manila University in 1979 and Master of Fine Arts from NYU Tisch School of the Arts in 1986. He is currently married to actress-writer Bibeth Orteza, and they have two children: Rafa, an actor, and Sarah, a writer.

== Filmography ==
=== Film ===
==== As a filmmaker ====
Year	Film	Credited as			Notes
Year	Film	Director	Writer	Producer	Notes
1988	Misis Mo, Misis Ko	Yes	No	No	Film directorial debut
1991	Hihintayin Kita sa Langit	Yes	No	No	
1992	Ikaw Pa Lang ang Minahal	Yes	No	No	
1993	Saan Ka Man Naroroon	Yes	No	No	
1993	Kailangan Kita	Yes	No	No	Also assistant editor
1995	Harvest Home	Yes	Story	No	Original title: Inagaw Mo ang Lahat sa Akin; Co-wrote the story with his wife and Oscar Miranda
1996	Abot-Kamay ang Pangarap	Yes	No	No	
1997	Ligaya ang Itawag Mo sa Akin	Yes	No	No	
1997	Ang Lalaki sa Buhay ni Selya	Yes	No	No	
1998	Tatlo... Magkasalo	Yes	No	Yes	
1999	Kahapon, May Dalawang Bata	Yes	No	Yes	
2000	Azucena	Yes	No	Yes	
2014	Where I Am King	Yes	No	Executive	Original title: Hari ng Tondo

==== As an actor ====
Year	Film	Role
1993	Kung Mawawala Ka Pa	Dr. Toribio
2023	GomBurZa	Bishop Francisco Gainza
2025	P77	Andrew Cambion
2025	Posthouse	Ruel Gallano
2026	Filipiñana	Renato
