= Saan Ka Man Naroroon (film) =

1993 romantic drama film by Carlos Siguion-Reyna

- Poster of the film's restored version, released in 2019 and designed by Justin Besana
- Directed by: Carlos Siguion-Reyna
- Written by: Raquel Villavicencio
- Based on: I girasoli by Tonino Guerra; Giorgi Mdivani; Cesare Zavattini
- Produced by: Armida Siguion-Reyna
- Starring: Richard Gomez; Dawn Zulueta; Sharmaine Arnaiz; Charito Solis
- Cinematography: Romeo Vitug
- Edited by: Jesus Navarro
- Music by: Ryan Cayabyab
- Production company: Reyna Films
- Distributed by: Bonanza Films
- Release date: July 8, 1993
- Running time: 100 minutes
- Country: Philippines
- Language: Filipino

Saan Ka Man Naroroon (English: Wherever You Are) is a 1993 Filipino romantic melodrama film directed by Carlos Siguion-Reyna. The screenplay, written by Raquel Villavicencio, is inspired by the 1970 Italian drama film Sunflower directed by Vittorio de Sica and starring Sophia Loren and Marcello Mastroianni. It stars Richard Gomez, Dawn Zulueta, Sharmaine Arnaiz, Charito Solis, and Richard Quan in his feature film debut.

Produced by Reyna Films and theatrically premiered on July 8, 1993, the film reunited Gomez and Zulueta with Siguion-Reyna, who directed them in Hihintayin Kita sa Langit. This film would be the last full-length film project teaming Gomez and Zulueta until they reunite again in the 2014 film She's Dating the Gangster.

In 2019, the film was digitally restored by ABS-CBN Film Restoration, in partnership with Central Digital Lab, and subsequently re-released in select theaters.

== Plot ==
Much to his mother Elena's chagrin, Miguel marries bar singer Amanda. Nevertheless, to appease his mother, Miguel tells Amanda that he promised his mother that Amanda would change and become a more proper wife.

Soon after, Miguel sets off with his friends, Vic and Danny, to mine gold with the hopes that he can earn enough to finish building a new home for Amanda and himself so that they no longer have to live with his exacting mother. On their journey, the group is ambushed by bandits. Miguel is left for dead. He is found by a lonely and orphaned young woman, Cita, who nurses him back to health. After going through his bag, however, Cita hides Miguel's wedding band and wallet, which contains a photo of Amanda. When Miguel regains consciousness, he has no recollection of his life nor even of who he is. Cita decides to call him "Martin" after her late father. While living with Cita, Miguel is haunted by memories of a mysterious woman, although they are not enough to recall Amanda or his life in any full detail.

Meanwhile, Amanda and Elena visit Danny in the hospital. Danny tells the two women that he saw Vic and Miguel die in the bandit attack. Elena blames Amanda for her son's supposed death, while Amanda refuses to believe Miguel is dead without seeing a body and resolves to find him. After searching relentlessly through the province, Amanda shows a photo of Miguel to someone who recognizes him as "Martin". She is brought to a house where she meets a pregnant Cita.

Upon seeing Amanda, Miguel's memory suddenly returns, but when he tries to reach out to her, his distraught wife takes off. She throws away her wedding band and burns down the frame of the house that Miguel had been building for them. Ruben, who has had his eye on Amanda since her singing days, takes the opportunity to go after her. When Miguel goes into town, he finds Amanda back to singing at the bar and now involved with Ruben. Miguel tries to talk to Amanda, but she remains upset at him for not trying to find out who he was while she was able to find him. She refuses to accept him back into her life. A dejected Miguel returns to Cita.

One day, Miguel finds the wedding band and wallet that Cita hid. When he confronts her, she says she did it because she loves him and begs him to stay. In the middle of their argument, Cita feels the baby coming. She gives birth to their child, a boy, but dies soon after. With her last breath, Cita thanks Miguel for the time they had together. Miguel again returns to town and sees Amanda, who is now prostituting herself, saying she was always seen as trash anyway. Begging Amanda for a second chance, Miguel admits that he did not search for who he was because he was weak and afraid of the life that he may have found. Amanda exclaims that it is too late, she is ruined, and past redemption, but Miguel promises that this time he will not leave her. Accepting each other for who they are, the couple reconciles to raise Miguel and Cita's son as their own.

== Cast ==
- Richard Gomez as Miguel
- Dawn Zulueta as Amanda
- Charito Solis as Elena
- Sharmaine Arnaiz as Cita
- Richard Quan as Ruben
- Iman Esturco as Vic
- Archie Adamos as Danny
- Raquel Villavicencio as Nurse
- Bibeth Orteza as Women at the Window
- Yvonne Ranada as Female agent

== Production ==
Much of the film was shot on location in Ilocos Norte and Ilocos Sur. The baroque Paoay Church of Ilocos Norte was featured in a scene.

=== Music ===
The theme song "Saan Ka Man Naroroon" was performed by Rachel Alejandro with an arrangement by Ryan Cayabyab. The love song was originally written in 1968 by Restie Umali with lyrics by Levi Celerio.

== Reception ==
The film was screened at the 1994 Toronto International Film Festival. Emanuel Levy of Variety concluded "helmer Siguion-Reyna shows talent for controlling the production's physical aspects, orchestrating a fluid narrative style, and eliciting proficient performances from his attractive cast."

=== Accolades ===
Year	Award	Category	Nominee(s)	Result	Ref.
1994	FAMAS Awards	Best Supporting Actress	Sharmaine Arnaiz	Won	
1994	Gawad Urian Awards	Best Direction (Pinakamahusay na Direksyon)	Carlos Siguion-Reyna	Nominated	
1994	Gawad Urian Awards	Best Actor (Pinakamahusay na Pangunahing Aktor)	Richard Gomez	Won	
1994	Gawad Urian Awards	Best Actress (Pinakamahusay na Pangunahing Aktres)	Dawn Zulueta	Nominated	
1994	Gawad Urian Awards	Best Supporting Actress (Pinakamahusay na Pangalawang Aktres)	Sharmaine Arnaiz	Won	
1994	Gawad Urian Awards	Best Cinematography (Pinakamahusay na Sinematograpiya)	Romeo Vitug	Won	
1994	Gawad Urian Awards	Best Music (Pinakamahusay na Musika)	Ryan Cayabyab	Nominated	
1994	Gawad Urian Awards	Best Sound (Pinakamahusay na Tunog)	Ramon Reyes	Won	
1994	Gawad Urian Awards	Best Production Design (Pinakamahusay na Disenyong Pamproduksiyon)	Joey Luna	Won	
1994	FAP Awards	Best Sound	Ramon Reyes	Won	
1994	Star Awards for Movies	New Movie Actor of the Year	Richard Quan	Won	
