= Misis Mo, Misis Ko =

- Official movie poster
- Directed by: Carlos Siguion-Reyna
- Written by: Bibeth Orteza
- Script consultant: Amado Lacuesta Jr.
- Produced by: Vic R. del Rosario Jr.; Armida Siguion-Reyna
- Starring: Edu Manzano; Dina Bonnevie; Jackie Lou Blanco; Ricky Davao
- Cinematography: Manolo Abaya
- Edited by: Jess Navarro
- Music by: Ryan Cayabyab
- Production company: Viva Films
- Distributed by: Viva Films
- Release date: 10 February 1988
- Running time: 115 minutes
- Country: Philippines
- Language: Filipino

Misis Mo, Misis Ko (English: Your Wife, My Wife) is a 1988 Philippine melodrama film directed by Carlos Siguion-Reyna in his feature film directorial debut from a story and screenplay written by his wife Bibeth Orteza, with Amado Lacuesta Jr. as script consultant. Starring Edu Manzano, Dina Bonnevie, Jackie Lou Blanco, and Ricky Davao, the film revolves around the infidelities of two married couples and they decide to change partners.

Co-produced by Armida Siguion-Reyna, the director's mother, she tested producing a film with Viva Films, under the helm of its founder and executive producer Vic del Rosario. The film was theatrically released on 10 February 1988 to critical and box office success. This successful attempt by Siguion-Reyna led to the establishment of Reyna Films, with their first film released three years later.

== Synopsis ==
The marriages of the two married couples, the Martinezes and the Villanuevas, are at the point of erosion when one of the spouses is committing adultery. With this, they decided to exchange partners, with Amado being paired with Cynthia and Rafael paired with Rebecca.

== Cast ==
- Edu Manzano as Amado Martinez
- Dina Bonnevie as Rebecca Martinez
- Jackie Lou Blanco as Cynthia Villanueva
- Ricky Davao as Rafael Villanueva
- Jaclyn Jose as Vida
- Ali Sotto as Kelly
- Rez Cortez as Gary
- Joji Isla as Albert

== Release ==
Misis Mo, Misis Ko was theatrically released on 10 February 1988. The film received its Japanese theatrical premiere on 25 July 1991, as part of the Philippine Film Festival in Tokyo.

=== Television broadcast ===
The film received a terrestrial television premiere on 17 November 1990, as a feature presentation for Tagalog Movie Greats, ABS-CBN's Saturday night movie presentation program. However, the film was retitled as Mahal Mo, Mahal Ko for this broadcast.

== Reception ==
=== Critical reception ===
Mario Hernando, the resident reviewer of GMA Network's movie program Movie Magazine, listed Misis Mo, Misis Ko as one of the six best Filipino films of the year 1988.

=== Accolades ===
Year	Award-Giving Body	Category	Recipient	Result	Ref(s)
1989	Catholic Mass Media Awards	Best Screenplay	Misis Mo, Misis Ko	Nominated	
1989	Catholic Mass Media Awards	Best Actor	Ricky Davao	Nominated	
1989	Catholic Mass Media Awards	Best Actor	Edu Manzano	Nominated	
1989	Gawad Urian Awards	Best Picture	Misis Mo, Misis Ko	Nominated	
1989	Gawad Urian Awards	Best Director	Carlos Siguion-Reyna	Nominated	
1989	Gawad Urian Awards	Best Screenplay	Bibeth Orteza	Nominated	
1989	Gawad Urian Awards	Best Actor	Ricky Davao	Nominated	
1989	Gawad Urian Awards	Best Actress	Jackie Lou Blanco	Nominated	
1989	Gawad Urian Awards	Best Supporting Actress	Jaclyn Jose	Nominated	
1989	Gawad Urian Awards	Best Cinematography	Manolo Abaya	Nominated	
1989	Gawad Urian Awards	Best Production Design	Leo Abaya and Charlie Arceo	Nominated	
1989	Gawad Urian Awards	Best Music	Ryan Cayabyab	Won	
1989	Gawad Urian Awards	Best Editing	Jesus "Jess" Navarro	Nominated	
1989	Gawad Urian Awards	Best Sound	Rolly Ruta	Nominated	
