= Ikaw Pa Lang ang Minahal =

1992 drama film by Carlos Siguion-Reyna

- The poster of the film's restored version featuring Adela. Poster was designed by Justin Besana.
- Directed by: Carlos Siguion-Reyna
- Written by: Raquel Villavicencio
- Based on: The Heiress by Augustus Goetz; Ruth Goetz; Washington Square by Henry James
- Produced by: Armida Siguion-Reyna
- Starring: Charito Solis; Eddie Gutierrez; Maricel Soriano; Richard Gomez
- Cinematography: Romeo Vitug
- Edited by: Jess Navarro
- Music by: Ryan Cayabyab
- Production company: Reyna Films
- Distributed by: Bonanza Films; ABS-CBN Film Productions (restored version)
- Release date: June 5, 1992
- Running time: 106 minutes
- Country: Philippines
- Language: Filipino

Ikaw Pa Lang ang Minahal (transl. You're the Only One I Have Loved) is a 1992 Filipino drama film directed by Carlos Siguion-Reyna and produced by Armida Siguion-Reyna. The screenplay, written by Raquel Villavicencio, is based on the 1949 drama film The Heiress, itself an adaptation of Henry James' 1880 novel Washington Square, directed by William Wyler and starring Olivia de Havilland and Montgomery Clift. It stars Maricel Soriano as Adela, the sheltered daughter of a renowned doctor, played by Eddie Gutierrez, while Richard Gomez stars as her suitor, David.

The film, theatrically released on June 5, 1992, was the second production of Reyna Films, after Hihintayin Kita sa Langit, reuniting director Siguion-Reyna with screenwriter Villavicencio and actor Gomez. In 2018, the film was digitally restored and remastered by the ABS-CBN Film Restoration Project and Central Digital Lab, Inc.

== Plot ==
Adela is a plain and pitifully awkward young woman whose father, the emotionally detached Maximo, makes no secret of how disappointed he is that she is nothing like his late wife, who died in childbirth. Despite his verbal and emotional mistreatment of her, Adela remains devoted to her father. Paula, her widowed aunt, moves in with them and soon attempts to show Adela the world beyond their mansion.

At a wedding party, Adela embarrasses herself while attempting to dance, then runs and hides in the garden. There she meets the handsome and debonair David. He reveals that he knows who she is, saying he asked his friends who she was after seeing her from afar. David soon begins courting Adela, who has never received such care and affection, with Paula encouraging them. Maximo, however, is immediately suspicious of David's intentions. Over dinner, David confesses that he has never worked a day in his life and used up his inheritance on travel, but insists that he is there because he is ready to settle down and start a family. Maximo tells Paula that he thinks David is only after Adela for her money. He feels his suspicions are confirmed after a frank discussion with David's sister, Caridad, who received no share of the inheritance from David despite being a widowed mother of five.

When David asks Maximo for his daughter's hand in marriage, Maximo gives the suitor a check to stay away from Adela. David refuses to accept the check, exclaiming he loves Adela. To test David's love for his daughter, Maximo separates the young couple for six months by taking Adela on a trip to the United States. When the father and daughter return, Adela is elated to learn from Paula that David has been steadfast in his love for her during their time apart. How Maximo takes the news, however, is that David had been visiting Paula at Maximo's home and treating the mansion like his own personal clubhouse while they were away.

Adela and David make plans to elope. Maximo overhears them and, in an abusive tirade, tells Adela that David could only love her for her money as she possesses no qualities any man could find attractive. When Adela and David see each other again, Adela says that she does not want to rely on her father anymore and affirms her resolve to elope. On the night of the planned elopement, David fails to show up. Adela runs to Caridad's house and learns that David has already left after borrowing money from his sister to go to Manila. Spurned by the man she loves, Adela grows cold, talks back to her father, and leaves his home.

Years later, Maximo is dying. Adela, with her child Jenny, returns to her father's home, claiming she is there only to secure her inheritance. On Maximo's deathbed, over a tense and emotional exchange, the father and daughter reconcile. Soon after, Maximo dies. Adela is visited by David, who asks for her forgiveness, saying that he left because he cared for Adela so much that he could not let her be disinherited because of him. Falling for David's promise to dedicate his life to Adela and Jenny's happiness, the couple rekindles their former romance and begins planning their wedding.

However, Adela sees David so comfortably drinking her father's liquor and acting out as if he were the master of the house already. She realizes that her father's suspicions were right all along. She also gave David a pair of cufflinks, made of gold and pearls, and wanted him to wear them on their wedding day. These were bought by Adela while she and her father were in the United States. Adela also wanted to make a document that Jenny would inherit all of her wealth. But David told her that she was still too young to inherit such wealth, but Adela insisted that it was for her future. David used the cufflinks as payment for his debts. It was found out that David would loan money that was used in gambling, especially cockfighting. On the day of the wedding, Adela, arriving late to the altar and not wearing her wedding gown, confronts David in front of their guests. She declares that she will only be seeking her happiness from then on without depending on anyone else. Adela throws bills of money at David before getting into a car and hugging her daughter.

== Cast ==
- Maricel Soriano as Adela Sevilla
  - Guila Alvarez as Young Adela Sevilla
- Richard Gomez as David Javier
- Charito Solis as Paula
- Eddie Gutierrez as Dr. Maximo Sevilla
- Dawn Zulueta as Adela Sevilla (mother)
- Armida Siguion-Reyna as Caridad
- Reyelmin Eduardo as Jenny

== Production ==
The role of Adela was originally offered to Vilma Santos, who initially accepted but had to pull out due to scheduling conflicts after shooting on the Regal Films production Sinungaling Mong Puso was delayed. Producer Armida Siguion-Reyna then offered the role to Maricel Soriano.

The film was shot at the Escudero family estate in Tiaong, Quezon.

=== Music ===
The film's musical score was composed by Ryan Cayabyab. The film's theme song "Kahit Na" was performed by singer Rachel Alejandro, with words and music by Willy Cruz and arrangement by Ryan Cayabyab. This is a cover version for Zsa Zsa Padilla but later used in the 2002 primetime soap opera of GMA Network's Habang Kapiling Ka with Joey Albert performing the theme song followed by Bakit Manipis ang Ulap?, which aired on TV5 in 2016.

== Release ==
With its distribution handled by Bonanza Films, the film was theatrically released on June 5, 1992, on 55 theaters across Metro Manila and its neighboring provinces of Rizal and Bulacan. It became a financial success for Reyna Films.

== Digital restoration ==
In 2018, the film was digitally restored and remastered by the ABS-CBN Film Restoration Project and Central Digital Lab, Inc. The restoration was done by scanning the film in 4K resolution and restoring it in 2K resolution. The film elements supplied by Reyna Films included the master picture negative and the sound negative. During the film's restoration process, the most prevalent damages found in the supplied material were bumps, splice marks, image instabilities, and molds. The image instability posed a big challenge and required the most number of restoration hours. The other damages include heavy black debris, grain, flicker, color shift, and missing frames.

The restored version premiered on April 18, 2018, at Trinoma mall in Quezon City, opening the "Cinema Classics" series.

=== Television broadcast ===
The restored version received its free-to-air television premiere on ABS-CBN on February 16, 2020, as a feature presentation for the network's Sunday's Best program. The showing attained a nationwide rating of 1.3%, losing to GMA Network's showing of the 2006 film Blue Moon which attained a rating of 2.6%.

== Reception ==
=== Accolades ===
Year	Award	Category	Nominee(s)	Result	Ref.
1993	FAP Awards	Best Picture	Ikaw Pa Lang ang Minahal	Won	
1993	FAP Awards	Best Director	Carlos Siguion-Reyna	Won	
1993	FAP Awards	Best Actor	Eddie Gutierrez	Won	
1993	FAP Awards	Best Screenplay	Raquel Villavicencio	Won	
1993	FAP Awards	Best Musical Score	Ryan Cayabyab	Won	
1993	FAP Awards	Best Sound	Gaudencio Barredo	Won	
1993	FAMAS Awards	Best Picture	Ikaw Pa Lang ang Minahal	Won	
1993	FAMAS Awards	Best Director	Carlos Siguion-Reyna	Won	
1993	FAMAS Awards	Best Actor	Richard Gomez	Nominated	
1993	FAMAS Awards	Best Actress	Maricel Soriano	Nominated	
1993	FAMAS Awards	Best Supporting Actor	Eddie Gutierrez	Won	
1993	FAMAS Awards	Best Child Performer	Guila Alvarez	Nominated	
1993	FAMAS Awards	Best Screenplay	Raquel Villacicencio	Won	
1993	FAMAS Awards	Best Musical Score	Ryan Cayabyab	Won	
1993	FAMAS Awards	Best Sound	Gaudencio Barredo	Won	
1993	FAMAS Awards	Best Editing	Jess Navarro	Won	
1993	FAMAS Awards	Best Production Design	Raymond Bajarias	Won	
1993	Gawad Urian Awards	Best Picture (Pinakamahusay na Pelikula)	Ikaw Pa Lang ang Minahal	Won	
1993	Gawad Urian Awards	Best Direction (Pinakamahusay na Direksyon)	Carlos Siguion-Reyna	Won	
1993	Gawad Urian Awards	Best Actress (Pinakamahusay na Pangunahing Aktres)	Maricel Soriano	Nominated	
1993	Gawad Urian Awards	Best Screenplay (Pinakamahusay na Dulang Pampelikula)	Raquel Villacicencio	Won	
1993	Gawad Urian Awards	Best Cinematography (Pinakamahusay na Sinematograpiya)	Romeo Vitug	Won	
1993	Gawad Urian Awards	Best Music (Pinakamahusay na Musika)	Ryan Cayabyab	Nominated	
1993	Gawad Urian Awards	Best Sound (Pinakamahusay na Tunog)	Gaudencio Barredo; Ramon Reyes	Nominated	
1993	Gawad Urian Awards	Best Production Design (Pinakamahusay na Disenyong Pamproduksiyon)	Raymond Bajarias	Nominated	
1993	Star Awards for Movies	Movie Editor of the Year	Jess Navarro	Won	
1993	Young Critics Circle	Best Film	Carlos Siguion-Reyna	Won	
1993	Young Critics Circle	Best Performance	Maricel Soriano	Won	
1993	Young Critics Circle	Best Screenplay	Raquel Villacicencio	Won	
1993	Young Critics Circle	Best Achievement in Sound and Aural Orchestration	Ryan Cayabyab; Gaudencio Barredo; Ramon Reyes	Nominated	
1993	Young Critics Circle	Best Achievement in Film Editing	Jess Navarro	Won	
1993	Young Critics Circle	Best Achievement in Cinematography and Visual Design	Romeo Vitug; Raymond Bajarias	Nominated	
