= Romy Vitug =

Filipino cinematographer (1937–2024)

- Born: Romeo Vitug Vitug; January 27, 1937; Floridablanca, Pampanga, Philippine Commonwealth
- Died: January 18, 2024 (aged 86); Imus City, Cavite, Philippines
- Other names: Romy
- Occupations: Cinematographer; Photojournalist
- Years active: 1957–2024
- Children: 3
- Relatives: Marites Dañguilan Vitug (sister-in-law)

Romeo "Romy" Vitug Vitug (January 27, 1937 – January 18, 2024) was a Filipino photojournalist and cinematographer. The son of Honesto Vitug, the Dean of Philippine Photojournalism, he began his career as a photojournalist and a newsreel cameraman before he became a cinematographer for films and television. He is also the uncle of film producer Charlie Garcia Vitug.

He had worked with directors including Carlos Siguion-Reyna, Joel Lamangan, Olivia Lamasan, Marilou Diaz-Abaya, Rory Quintos, Emmanuel Borlaza, Lino Brocka, Celso Ad Castillo, Eddie Garcia and Mario O'Hara.

Vitug died of blood cancer in Imus, Cavite on January 18, 2024, at the age of 86.

== Credits ==
=== Film ===
==== As a cinematographer ====
- Recuerdo of Two Sundays and Two Roads That Lead to the Sea (1969)
- Plaza Miranda Bombing (1971)
- Mga Bilanggong Birhen (1977)
- Atsay (1978)
- Salome (1981)
- Sinasamba Kita (1982)
- Mga Uod at Rosas (1982)
- Haplos (1982)
- Paano Ba ang Mangarap? (1983)
- Sa Hirap at Ginhawa (1984)
- Kung Mahawi Man ang Ulap (1984)
- Bituing Walang Ningning (1985)
- Payaso (1986)
- Saan Nagtatago ang Pag-ibig? (1987)
- Kahit Wala Ka Na (1989)
- Beautiful Girl (1990)
- Kapag Langit ang Humatol (1990)
- Hihintayin Kita sa Langit (1991)
- Ikaw Pa Lang ang Minahal (1992)
- Saan Ka Man Naroroon (1993)
- Kung Mawawala Ka Pa (1993)
- Maalaala Mo Kaya: The Movie (1994)
- Inagaw Mo ang Lahat sa Akin (1995)
- Sana Maulit Muli (1995)
- The Flor Contemplacion Story (1995)
- Bakit May Kahapon Pa? (1996)
- Sa Aking mga Kamay (1996)
- Bayad Puri (1997)
- Rizal sa Dapitan (1997)
- Pusong Mamon (1998)
- Sa Pusod ng Dagat (1998)
- Ooops, Teka Lang... Diskarte Ko 'To! (2001)
- Dalaw (2009)

=== Television ===
==== As a cinematographer ====
- Tanging Yaman (2010)
- Alyna (2010–2011)
- E-Boy (2012)
- Magpahanggang Wakas (2016–2017)
- The Good Son (2017–2018)

==== As a lighting director ====
- GMA Telesine Specials
  - Anak... Ang Iyong Ama (1993)
  - Adios, Dulce Estranjera (1995)
- Kim – Awit kay Inay (2011)
- Regal Shocker – Piano (2011)
- Maalaala Mo Kaya
  - Balot (2011)
  - Hat (2015)
  - Barung-Barong (2015)
