= Harvest Home (1995 film) =

1995 film by Carlos Siguion-Reyna

- Film poster
- Directed by: Carlos Siguion-Reyna
- Screenplay by: Bibeth Orteza
- Story by: Oscar Miranda; Bibeth Orteza; Carlos Siguion-Reyna
- Produced by: Armida Siguion-Reyna
- Starring: Maricel Soriano; Snooky Serna
- Cinematography: Nap Jamir; Romy Vitug
- Edited by: Jesus Navarro
- Music by: Ryan Cayabyab
- Production company: Reyna Films
- Distributed by: Megavision Films
- Release dates: June 7, 1995 (Philippines); September 11, 1995 (TIFF)
- Running time: 103 minutes
- Country: Philippines
- Language: Filipino

Harvest Home (Filipino: Inagaw Mo Ang Lahat Sa Akin / transl. You Stole Everything from Me) is a 1995 Philippine melodrama film directed by Carlos Siguion-Reyna from a story he co-wrote with Oscar Miranda and Bibeth Orteza, who solely wrote the screenplay. The film stars Maricel Soriano and Snooky Serna as sisters reunited after the death of their father, with Armida Siguion-Reyna (who also served as the producer), Eric Quizon, Tirso Cruz III, and Robert Arevalo in supporting roles.

A sixth film produced by Reyna Films, the film was first released domestically on June 7, 1995. It was internationally screened on September 11, as one of the competing entries at the 20th Toronto International Film Festival in Canada. It is also one of the entries selected as the Philippines' entry for the Best Foreign Language Film at the 68th Academy Awards but was not accepted as a nominee.

== Plot ==
In a quiet, rural village, Jacinta patiently tends to her mother, Almeda, a religious and pious woman who has slowly been losing her sanity since the death of her husband, Arcadio, several years prior. Jacinta is shown to be hard-working in the field and is admired by the women of the village as a dutiful daughter and wife, all in spite of the cold treatment shown by her husband, Peping.

Meanwhile, her younger sister, Clarita, has not returned home in ten years since leaving to study in Manila. She has since married a lawyer from the city, Joey.

Clarita travels with her husband to her hometown to sort out the land titles of Arcadio. The sisters are reunited, but Clarita is uneasy being back home. Meanwhile, Peping shows animosity towards Clarita and Joey in part due to his previous relationship with Clarita before she left for Manila.

During a conversation between Joey and Almeda, Almeda discovers Peping's love letters to Clarita that were buried, causing Almeda to become hysterical. Jacinta would eventually become furious at Joey because of what happened. Peping also told Clarita that he would send letters to her, and Clarita would also do the same thing. However, she would give those letters to Jacinta, but Jacinta would hide the letters from both of them. While being cleaned up by Jacinta, Almeda told her that an empathetic Joey is about to give the letters to Peping, causing Jacinta to try to attack Joey for attempting to reveal the truth.

When the family reached the cemetery where Arcadio is buried, Jacinta recalled when her father discovered the letters. She reveals that Clarita had been suffering from sexual abuse by Arcadio. Clarita had already run away from home, and in an intense confrontation between Jacinta and Arcadio, Jacinta pushed her father, causing his head to hit a sharp object, which killed him. Jacinta told her mother about Clarita's sexual abuse at the hands of Arcadio, demanding that no one should know about the truth behind Arcadio's death, or else she would slander Clarita as her father's mistress. Her sanity unraveling, Jacinta expresses her jealousy over their father's favor for Clarita, and they have an intense brawl at the cemetery before Peping breaks it up.

Their issues resolved, Clarita tells Peping to take care of her sister before she and Joey return to Manila and bring Almeda so she can seek treatment. Still mentally ill, Jacinta recalls her father raping Clarita, who managed to escape. She would then attempt to seduce Arcadio and tell her father to love her instead, but he would rebuff her with laughter. Peping saw Jacinta crying about the incident and promised to take care of her.

After harvesting rice, Peping watches Jacinta dancing in the fields.

== Cast ==
- Maricel Soriano as Jacinta
- Snooky Serna as Clarita
- Eric Quizon as Joey
- Tirso Cruz III as Peping
- Armida Siguion-Reyna as Almeda
- Robert Arevalo as Arcadio
- Jess Evardone as Priest
- Marilyn Mortiz, Merle Suba, and Yolanda Unabia as Three Women

== Digital restoration ==
The film was digitally restored and remastered by the ABS-CBN Film Restoration Project (Sagip Pelikula) and Central Digital Lab. Due to the COVID-19 pandemic, the film was premiered instead in digital platforms on December 17, 2020, through ABS-CBN's exclusive digital events service, KTX.ph and December 19, 2020, on digital streaming platforms iWantTFC and TFC IPTV.

After the pandemic restrictions were eased, the film's restored version finally received a theatrical release on March 19, 2023 at the Manila Metropolitan Theater, as part of the "Mga Hiyas ng Sineng Filipino" exhibition. The screening includes a talkback session with the attendance of the film's director Carlos Siguion-Reyna, screenwriter Bibeth Orteza, lead actresses Maricel Soriano and Snooky Serna, co-stars Tirso Cruz III (who was the chairperson of FDCP at the time) and Jess Evardone, and Manet Dayrit, CEO of Central Digital Lab.

== Reception ==
=== Critical reception ===
Emanuel Levy of Variety wrote that the film was "elegantly and smoothly executed," while praising the "strong performances" of actresses Maricel Soriano and Snooky Serna, who "make their roles seem more compassionate and appealing than they actually are."

=== Accolades ===
Year	Award	Category	Nominee(s)	Result
1996	FAMAS Awards	Best Picture	Inagaw mo ang Lahat sa Akin	Won
1996	FAMAS Awards	Best Director	Carlos Siguion-Reyna	Nominated
1996	FAMAS Awards	Best Supporting Actress	Armida Siguion-Reyna	Won
1996	FAMAS Awards	Best Story	Oscar Miranda, Bibeth Orteza	Won
1996	Gawad Urian Awards	Best Supporting Actor (Pinakamahusay na Pangalawang Aktor)	Tirso Cruz III	Nominated
1996	Gawad Urian Awards	Best Editing (Pinakamahusay na Editing)	Jess Navarro	Nominated
1996	Gawad Urian Awards	Best Production Design (Pinakamahusay na Disenyong Pamproduksiyon)	Joey Luna	Nominated
1996	Gawad Urian Awards	Best Sound (Pinakamahusay na Tunog)	Ramon Reyes	Nominated
1996	FAP Awards	Best Actress	Snooky Serna	Nominated
1996	FAP Awards	Best Supporting Actor	Tirso Cruz III	Nominated
1996	PMPC Star Awards for Movies	Movie of the Year	Inagaw mo ang Lahat sa Akin	Nominated
1996	PMPC Star Awards for Movies	Director of the Year	Carlos Siguion-Reyna	Nominated
1996	PMPC Star Awards for Movies	Screenplay of the Year	Bibeth Orteza	Nominated
1996	PMPC Star Awards for Movies	Cinematographer of the Year	Romy Vitug	Won
1996	Young Critics Circle	Best Achievement in Cinematography and Visual Design	Nap Jamir, Romy Vitug, Joey Luna	Nominated
