= Paoay Church =

Roman Catholic church in Ilocos Norte, Philippines

- Saint Augustine Parish Church
- San Agustin Church of Paoay
- Iglesia de San Agustín de Paoay (Spanish)
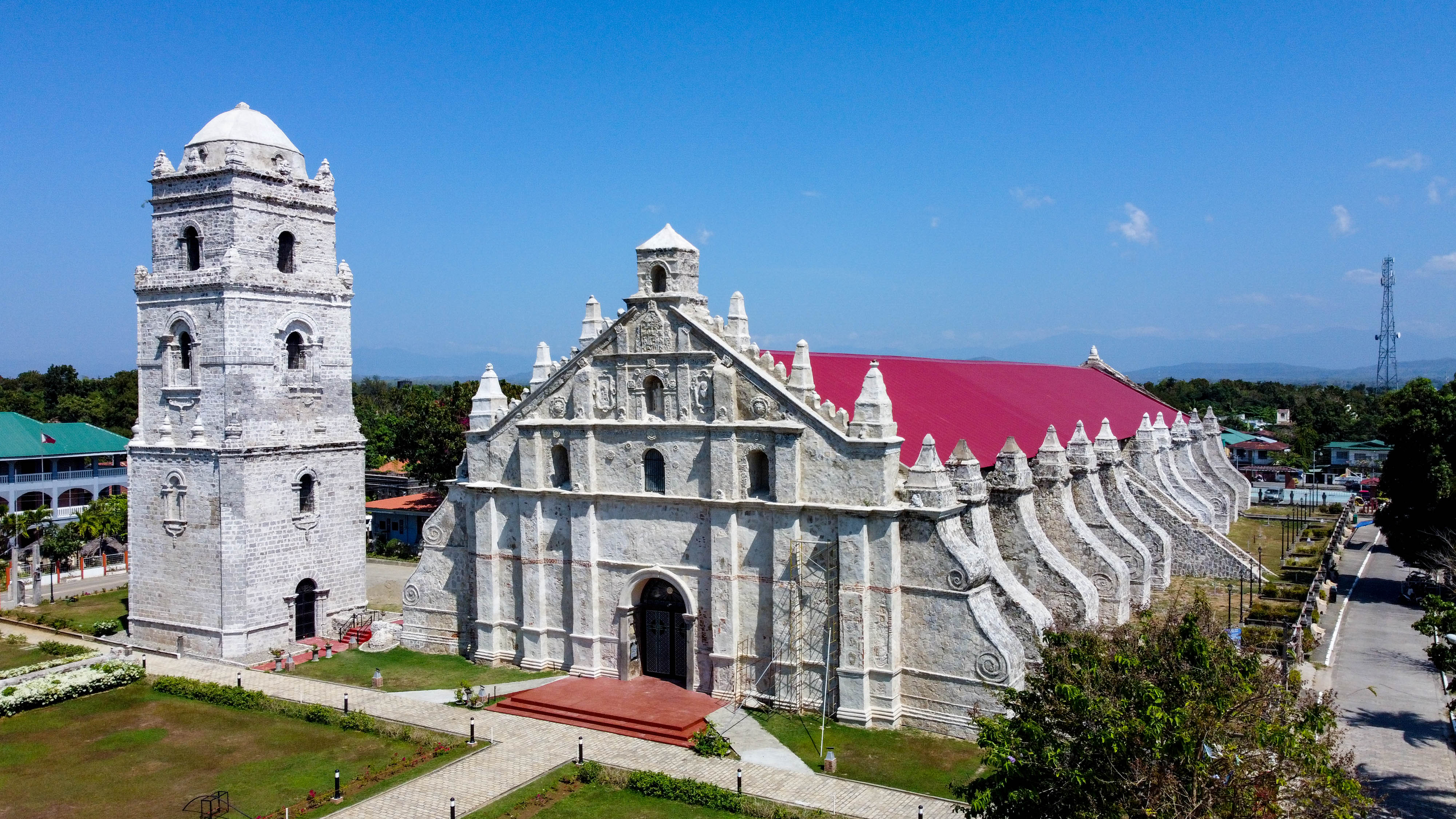
- Church façade and bell tower in 2023

- Location in Luzon Location in the Philippines
- 18°3′41.5″N 120°31′17.5″E
- Location: Paoay, Ilocos Norte
- Country: Philippines
- Denomination: Roman Catholic

History
- Status: Parish church
- Founded: 1686; 340 years ago
- Founder: Padre Antonio Estavillo
- Dedication: Saint Augustine of Hippo

Architecture
- Functional status: Active
- Heritage designation: National Cultural Treasure, World Heritage Site
- Designated: 1973, 1993
- Architect: Padre Antonio Estavillo
- Architectural type: Church building
- Style: Earthquake Baroque
- Groundbreaking: 1694; 332 years ago
- Completed: 1710; 316 years ago

Specifications
- Length: 110 metres (360 ft)
- Width: 40 metres (130 ft)
- Materials: Coral stone and bricks

Administration
- Province: Nueva Segovia
- Diocese: Laoag

UNESCO World Heritage Site
- Official name: Church of San Agustin (Paoay)
- Part of: Baroque Churches of the Philippines
- Criteria: Cultural: (ii)(iv)
- Reference: 677bis-003
- Inscription: 1993 (17th Session)
- Extensions: 2013

National Cultural Treasures
- Official name: Church of Paoay
- Type: House of worship
- Designated: August 1, 1973; 53 years ago
- Legal basis: PD No. 260, s. 1973
- Region: Ilocos Region
- Marker date: May 2, 1980; 46 years ago

Saint Augustine Parish Church, commonly known as Paoay Church, is a Roman Catholic church in the municipality of Paoay, Ilocos Norte in the Philippines. It is under the ecclesiastical jurisdiction of the Diocese of Laoag. Completed in 1710, the church is famous for its distinctive architecture, a highlight of which are the enormous buttresses on the sides and the back of the building.

It is declared as a National Cultural Treasure by the Philippine government in 1973 and a UNESCO World Heritage Site under the collective group of Baroque Churches of the Philippines in 1993.

== History ==
The earliest historical record of the area dates back to 1593, becoming an independent Augustinian parish by 1686. The construction of the present church was started in 1694 by Augustinian friar Father Antonio Estavillo and was completed in 1710. It was later on rededicated in 1896.

Some portions of the church were damaged in the 1865 and 1885 earthquakes but was later restored under the initiative of former First Lady, Imelda Marcos.

=== Restorations ===
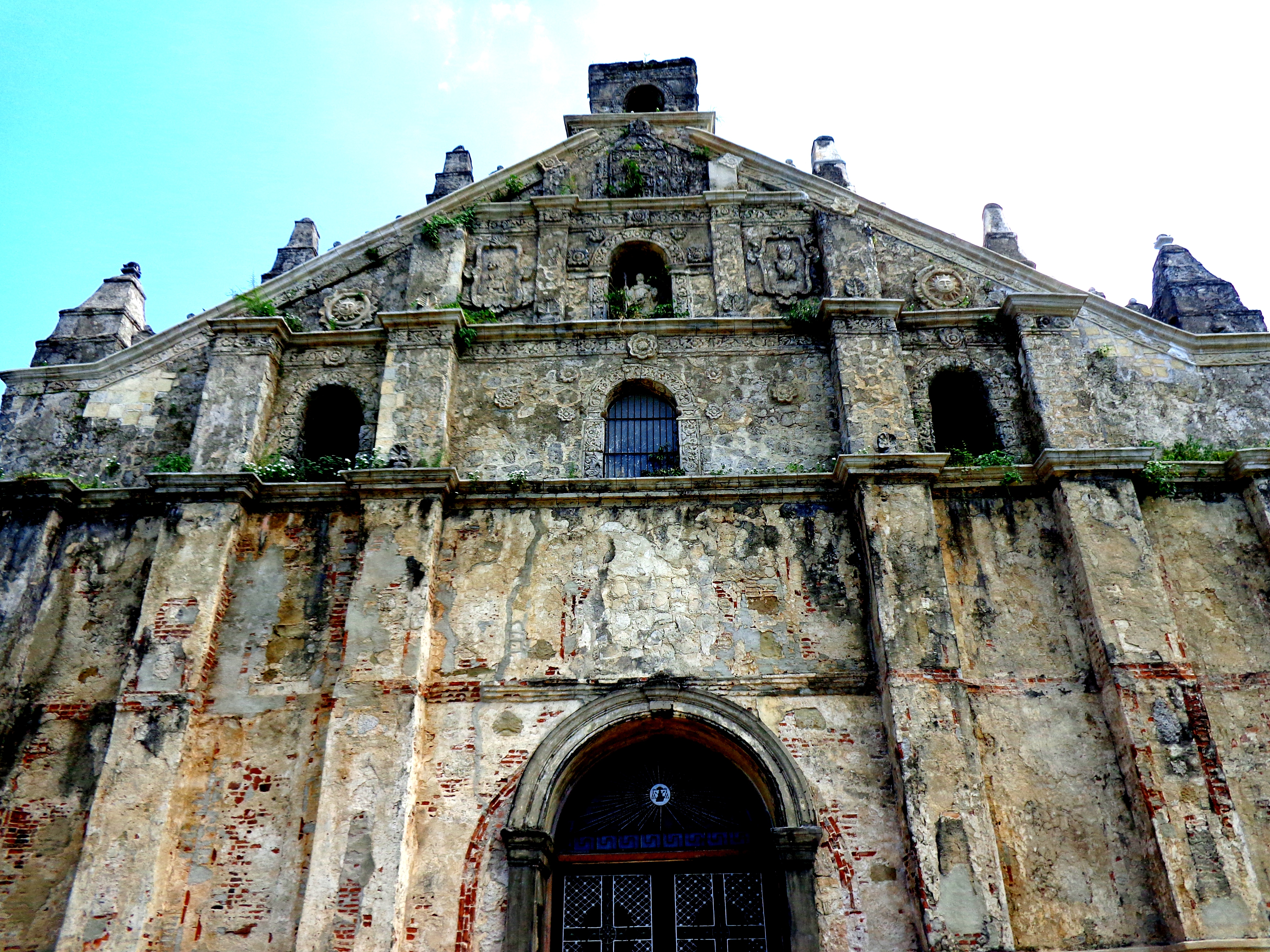
Facade in 2012, prior to restoration

Several projects for the restoration of the Paoay Church were sought by government and non-government organizations due to possible questions over its structural integrity. The Provincial Government of Ilocos Norte through resolution, in 2014, sought the retrofitting of the church and the reconstruction of the church's convent which were in ruins.

The restoration of the church's buttresses, walls, tower, and interior was announced in 2018. Conservation of the church's exteriors was begun by the National Historical Commission of the Philippines in the second quarter of 2019 and completed in June 2020. Work focused on the historic stone masonry walls and buttresses. Vegetation was removed from the exteriors to prevent stone erosion and lime grout loss. Major structural repair was done on the stairway of the bell tower. The entire roof system was also rehabilitated as part of the project.

The restored structure was turned over to the Laoag diocese in November 2020, and was reopened on November 15 of that year.

== Architecture ==
Paoay church is the Philippines' primary example of a Spanish colonial earthquake baroque architecture dubbed by Alicia Coseteng, an interpretation of the European Baroque adapted to the seismic condition of the country through the use of enormous buttresses on the sides and back of the building. The adaptive reuse of baroque style against earthquake is developed since many destructive earthquakes destroyed earlier churches in the country. Javanese architecture reminiscent of Borobudur of Java can also be seen on the church walls and façade.

=== Buttresses ===
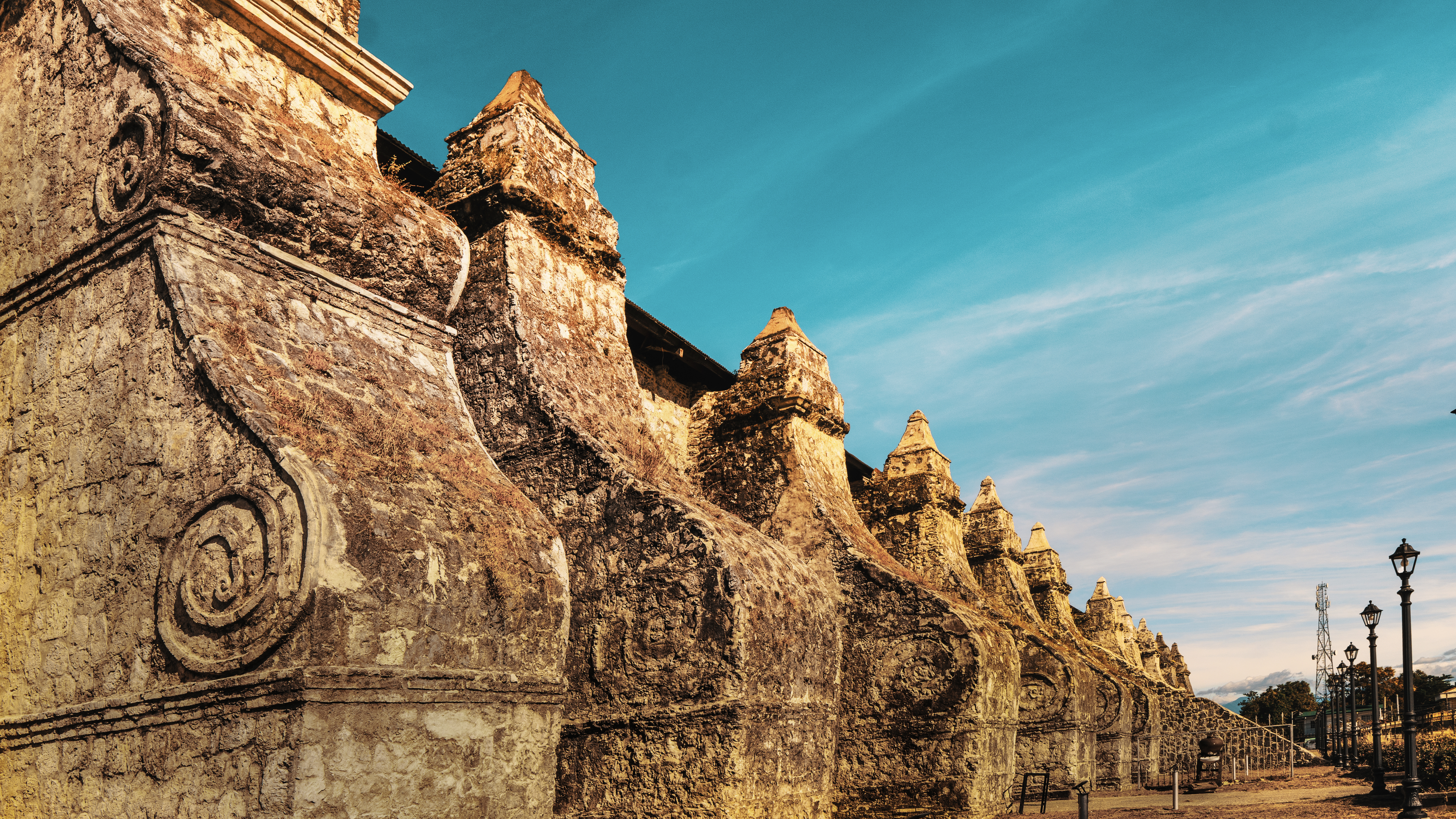
Buttresses

The most striking feature of Paoay Church is the 24 huge buttresses of about 1.67 metres (5.5 ft) thick at the sides and back of the church building. Extending from the exterior walls, it was conceived to a solution to possible destruction of the building due to earthquakes. Its stair-like buttresses (known as step buttresses) at the sides of the church is possibly for easy access of the roof.

=== Walls ===
Its walls are made of large coral stones on the lower part and bricks at the upper levels. The mortar used in the church includes sand and lime with sugarcane juice boiled with mango leaves, leather and rice straw. Its walls suggests Javanese architectural styles.

=== Façade ===
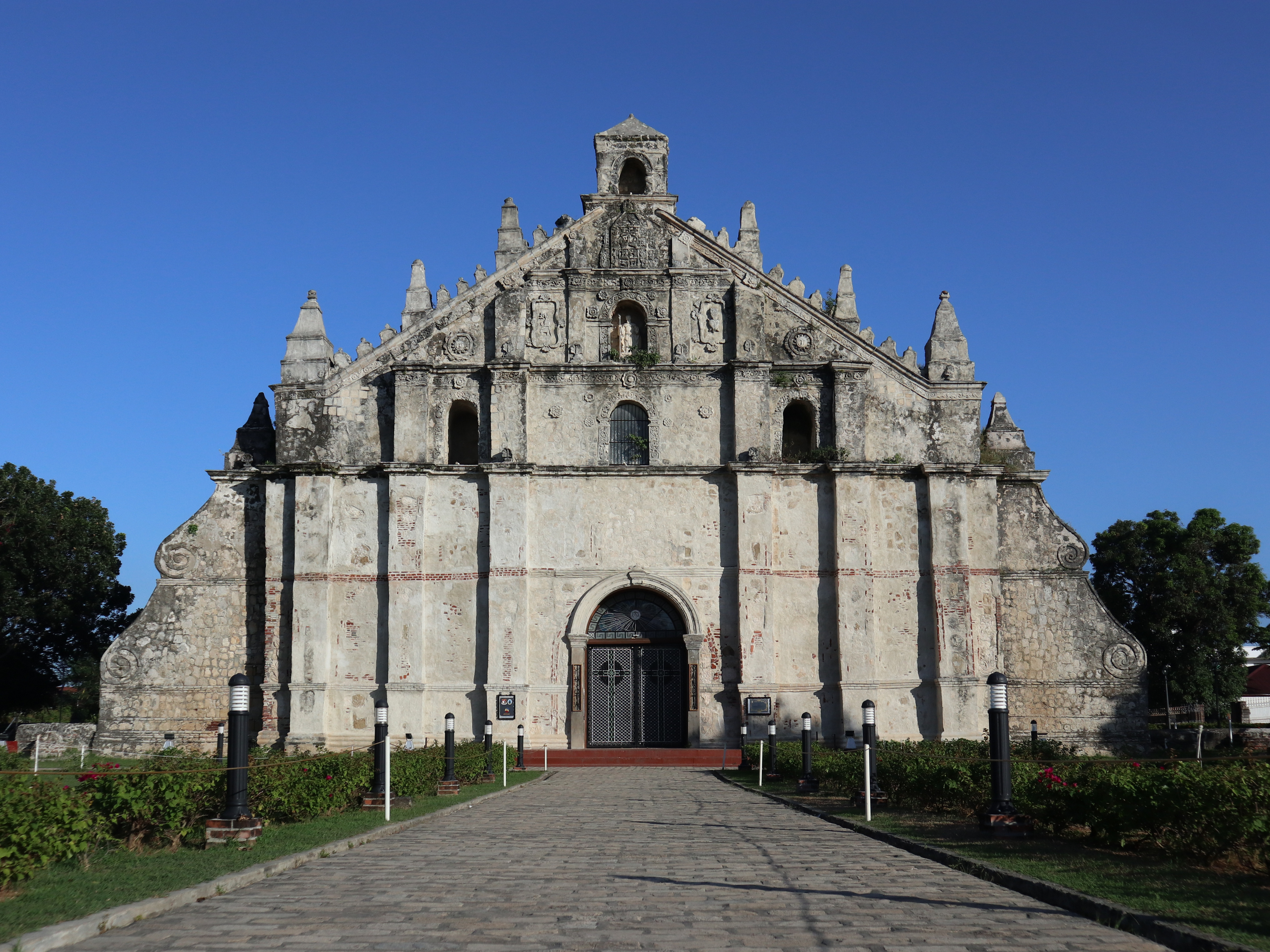
Church facade in 2022

The stone façade appear as massive pediment rising from the ground and is built leaning towards the front. Square pilasters and stringed cornices divide the façade vertically and horizontally respectively. Its bottom part is plain. Gothic features are also present through the use of finials while the triangular pediment shows Chinese elements and Oriental strokes. Crenellations, niches, rosettes and the Augustinian coat of arms can also be seen. The façade is made of brick on the lower level and coral stones on the upper level.

=== Bell tower ===
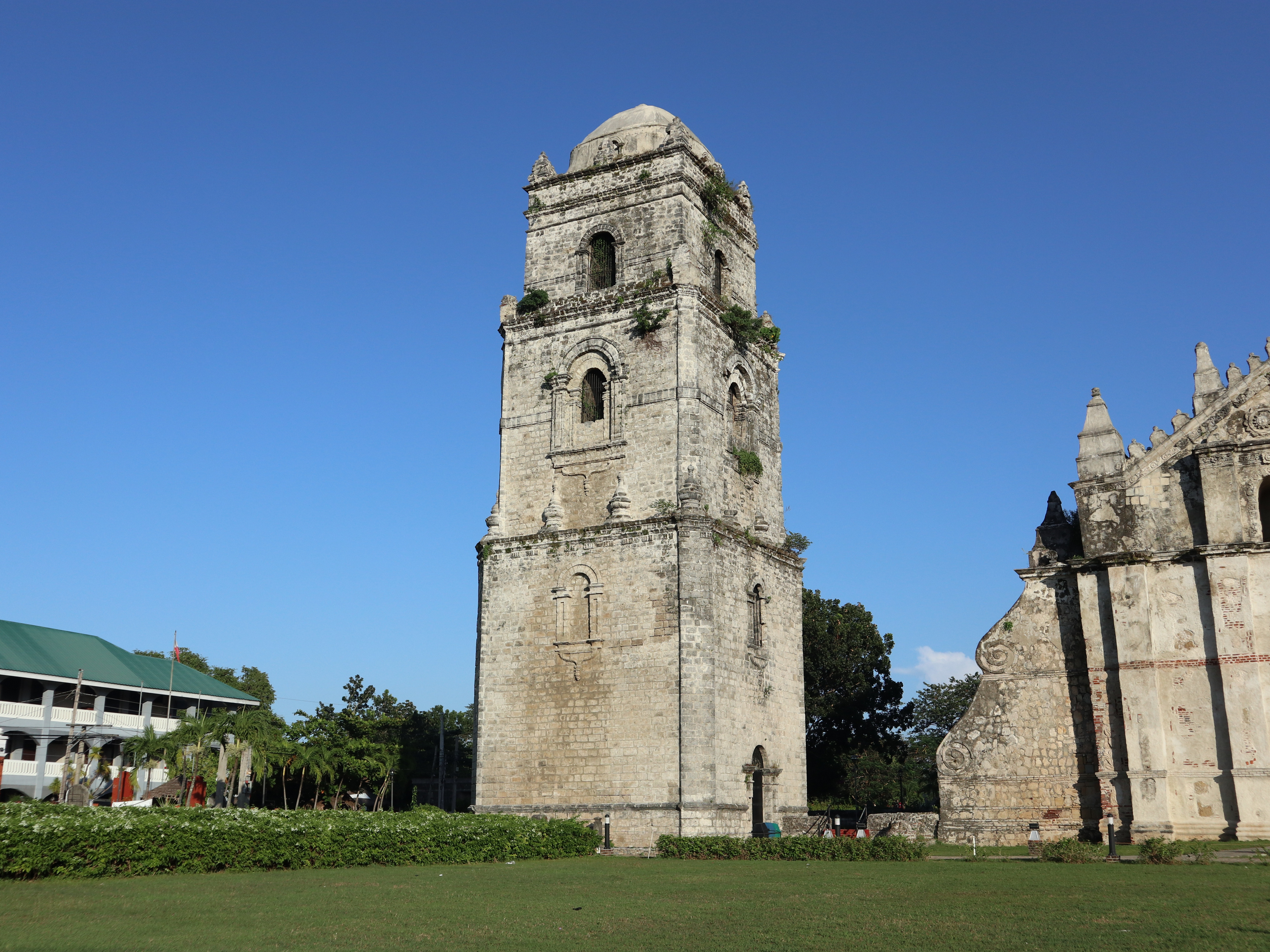
Bell tower

Adjacent to the façade is a three-storey coral bell tower constructed separately from the church building on the right side resembling a pagoda. It was in 1793 when the cornerstone of the bell tower was laid. It stands at some distance from the church as a protection against earthquake. It served as observational post for Filipino revolutionaries against the Spaniards in 1898 and by Filipino guerrillas against Japanese soldiers during World War II. According to historians, the bell tower also served as a status symbol for the locals. It is said that the bell would ring more loudly and more times during the wedding of a prominent clan that it would during the wedding of the poor.

== Declarations ==
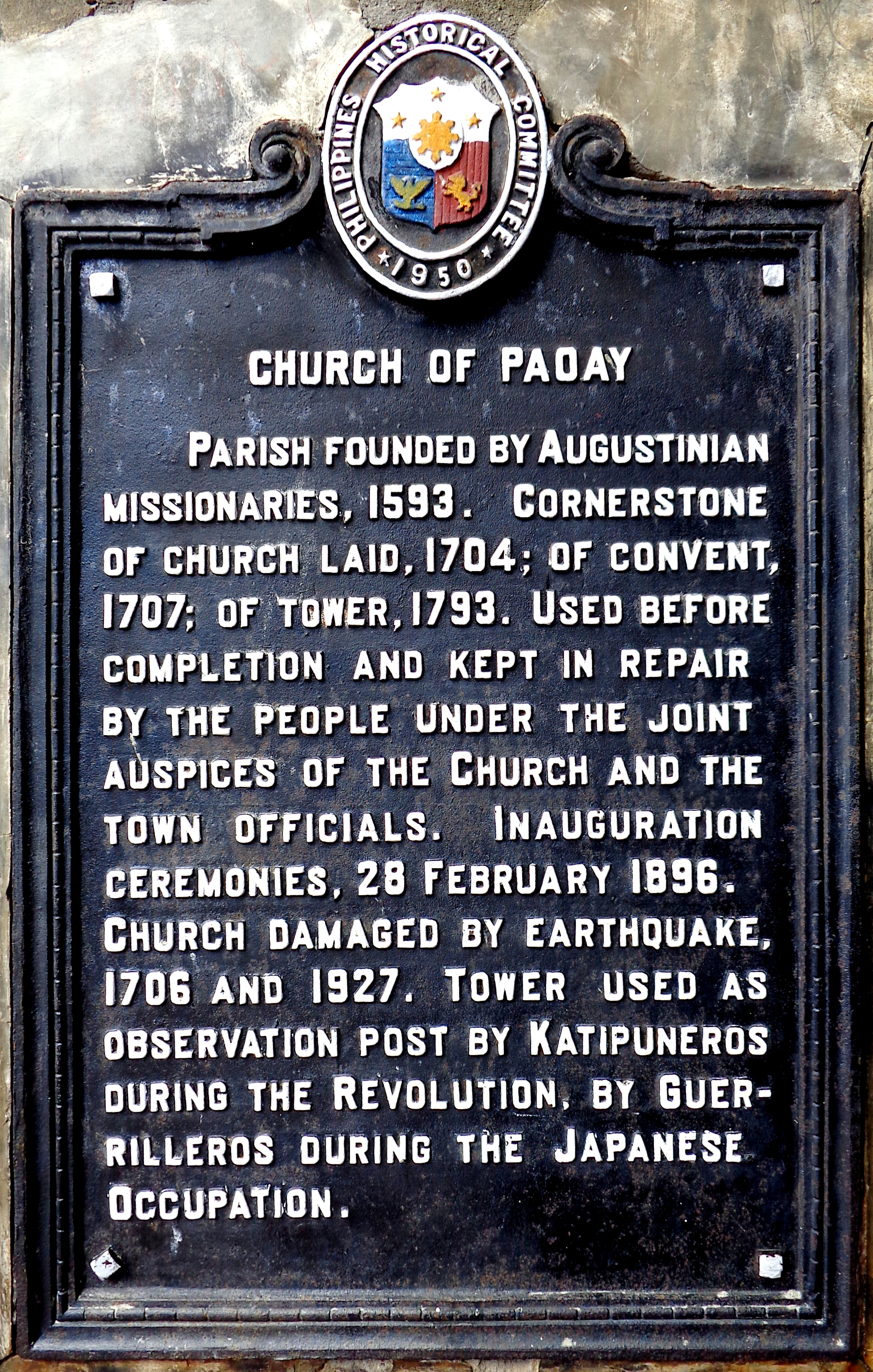
Church PHC historical marker installed in 1950

By virtue of Presidential Decree No. 260, Paoay Church was declared as a National Cultural Treasure by the Philippine government in 1973. The church was designated as a UNESCO World Heritage Site together with San Agustin Church in Manila; Nuestra Señora de la Asuncion Church in Santa Maria, Ilocos Sur; and Sto. Tomas de Villanueva Parish Church in Miagao, Iloilo on December 11, 1993.

== In popular culture ==
The church was featured in a scene in the 1993 romance film Saan Ka Man Naroroon, which was shot in Ilocos Norte and Ilocos Sur.

== Gallery ==
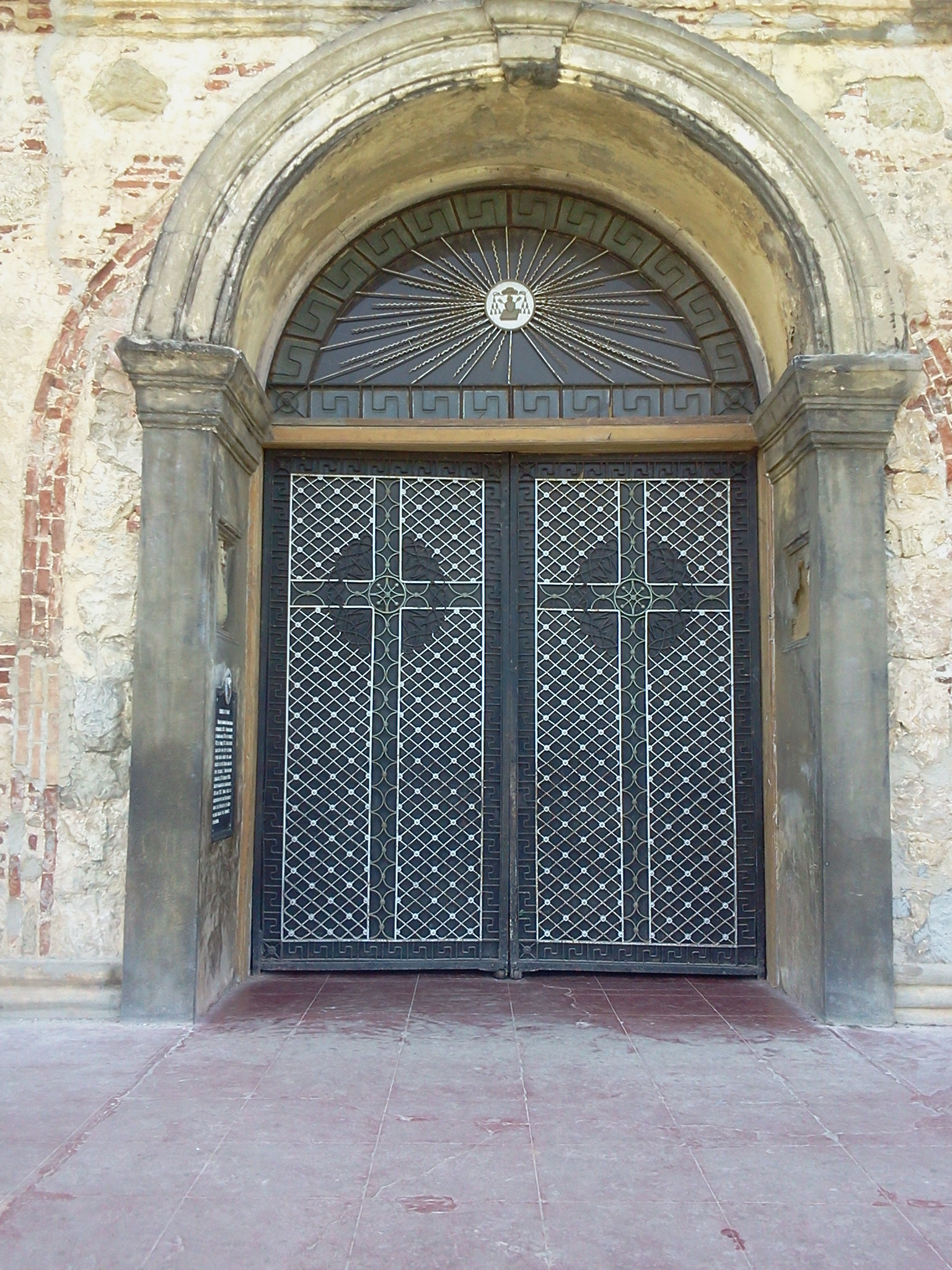
Church main portal

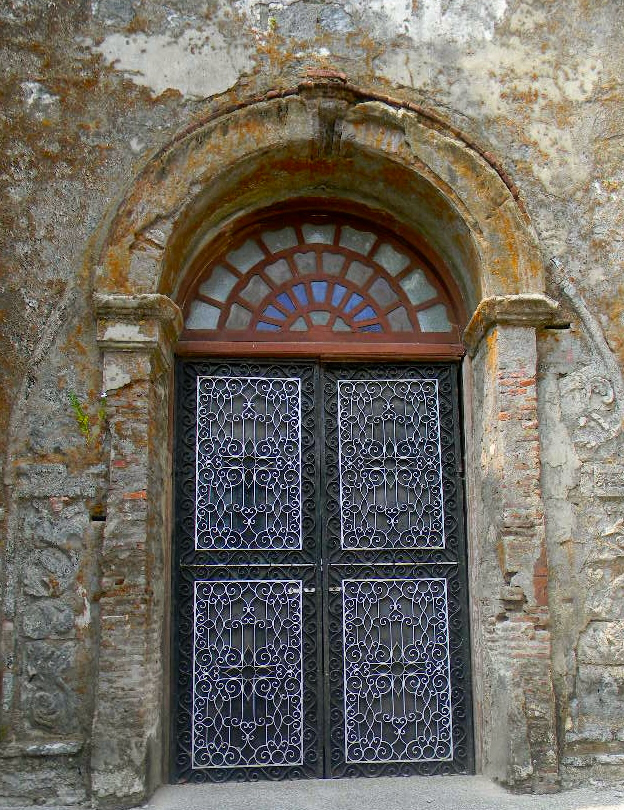
Side portal

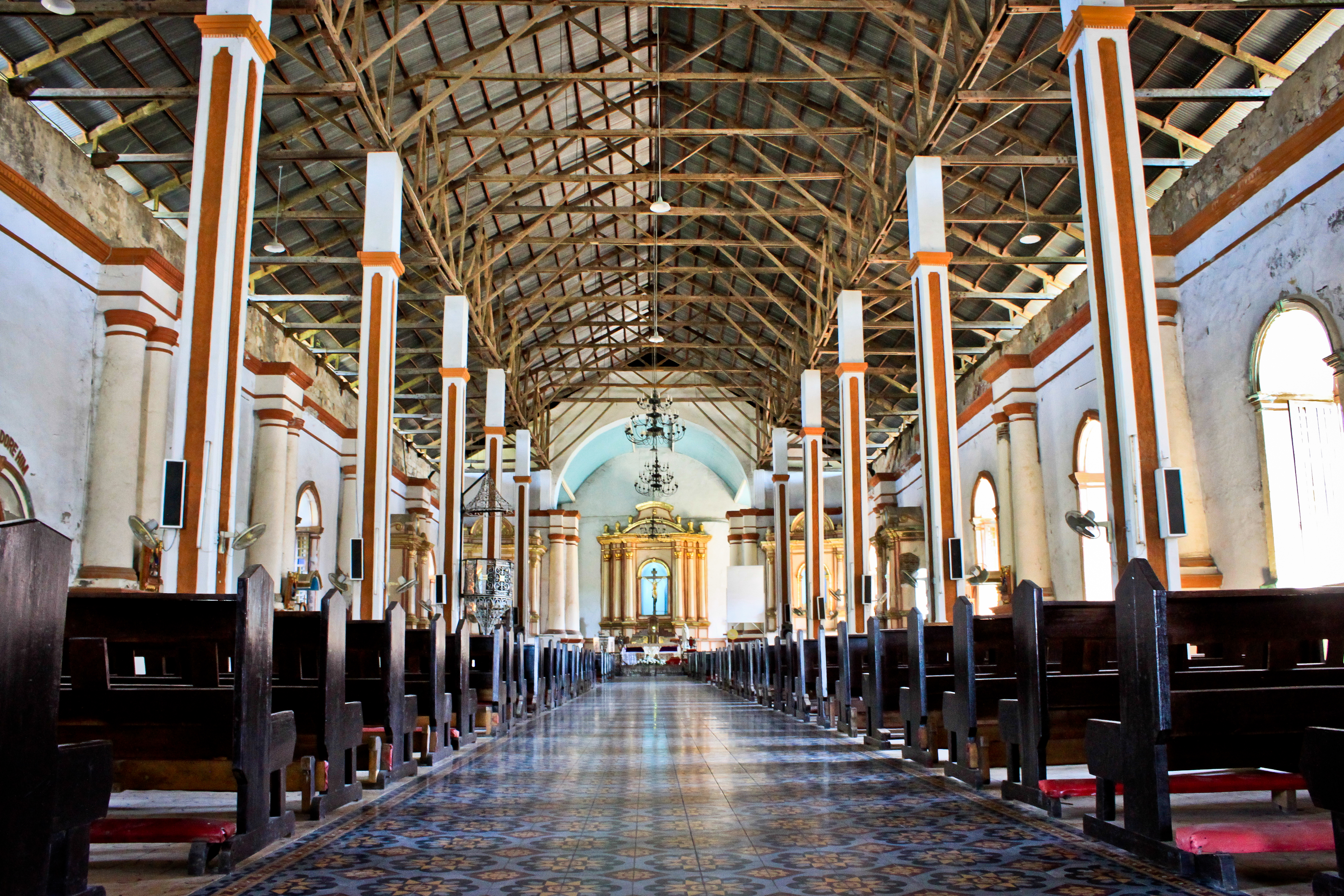
The interior in 2012, pre-restoration

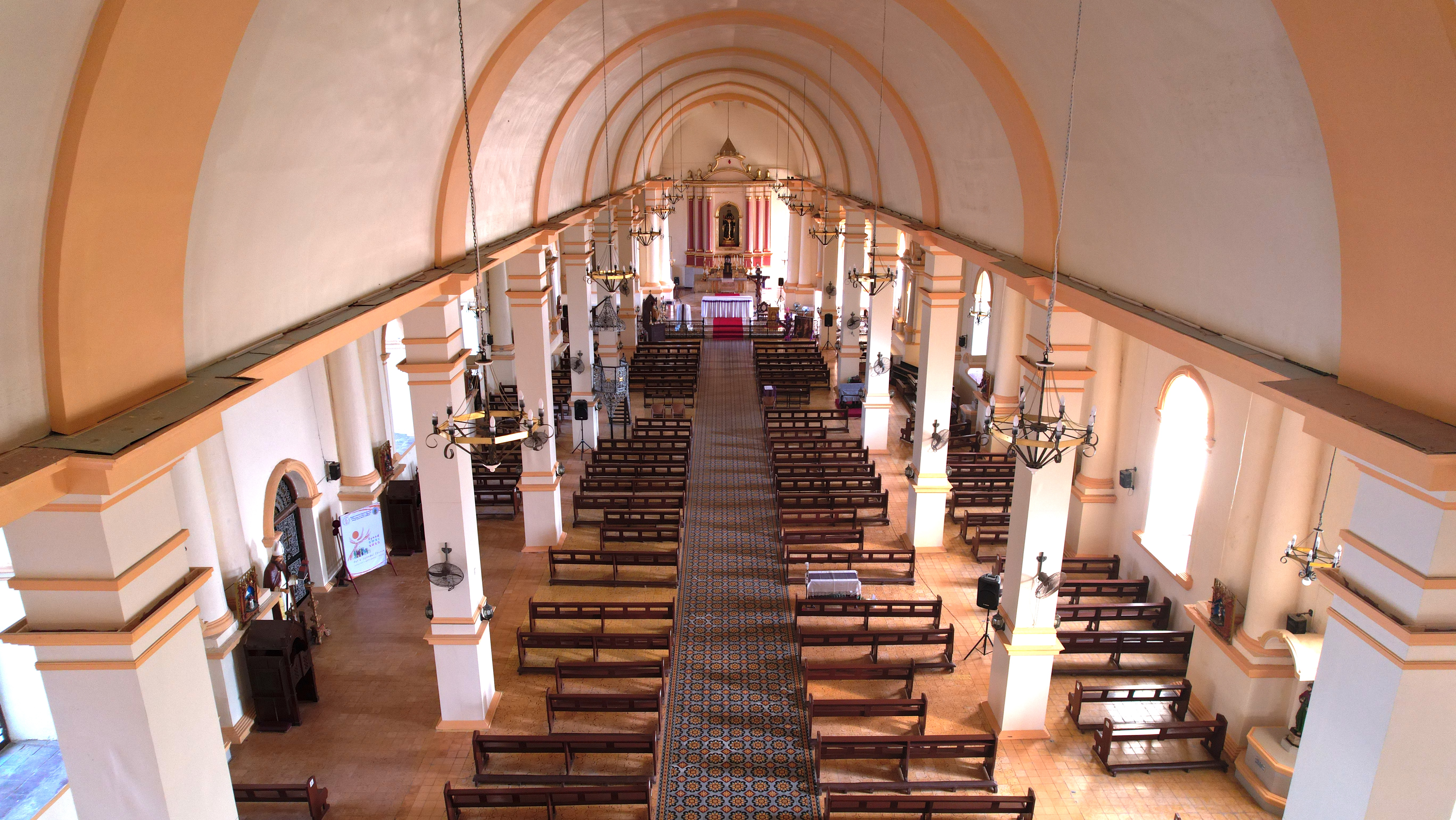
The interior in 2021, post-restoration

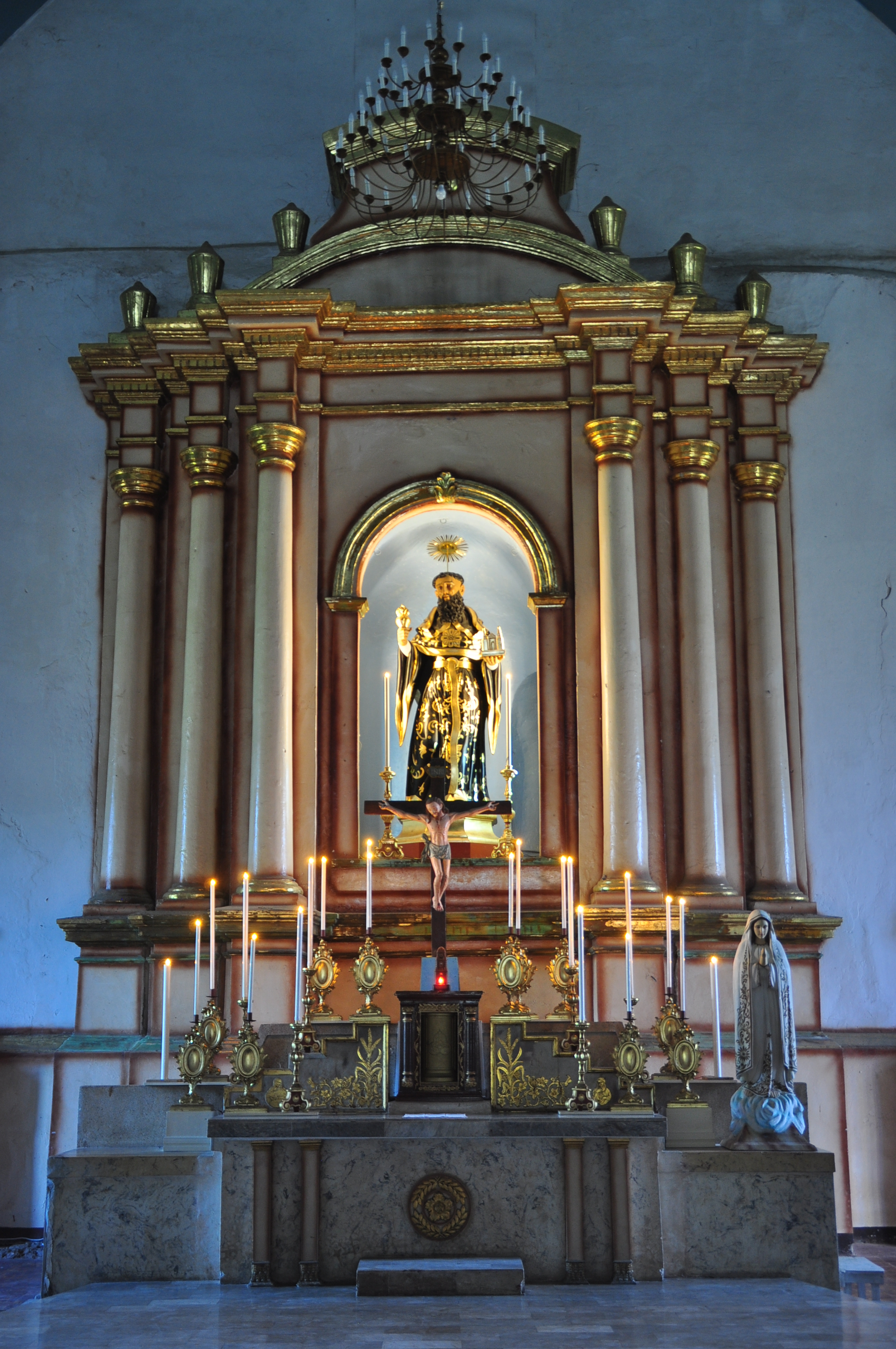
Church altar and retablo mayor

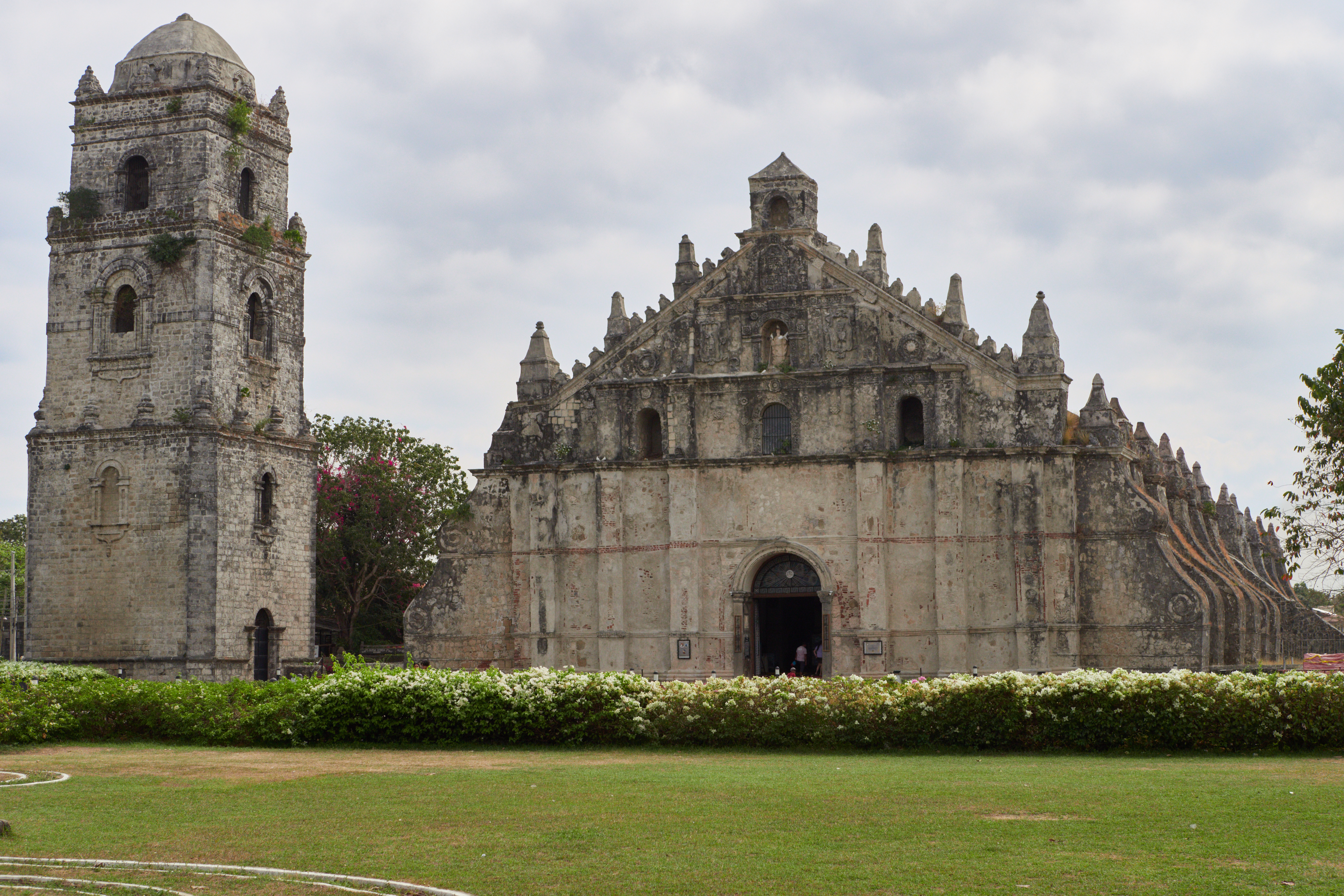

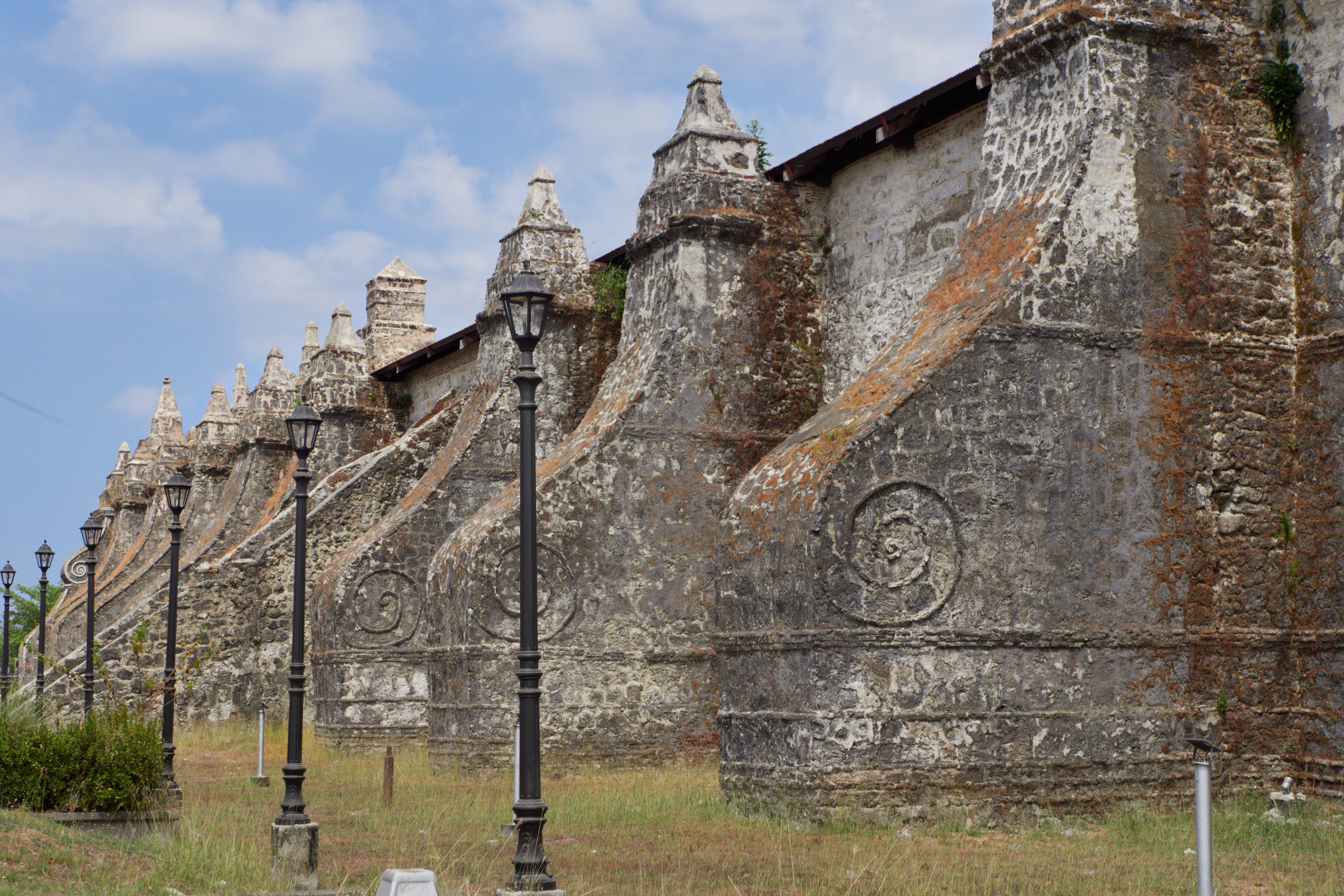
Side buttresses

== See also ==
- Architecture of the Philippines
- Spanish Baroque architecture
