= The Woven Stories of the Other =

- Directed by: Sherad Anthony Sanchez
- Written by: Sherad Anthony Sanchez
- Starring: Marilyn Roque; Jeliete Ruca; Ronald Arguelles
- Release date: 2006
- Running time: 97 minutes
- Country: Philippines
- Language: Mindanao Bisaya

The Woven Stories of the Other (original title: Huling Balyan ng Buhi meaning "the last priestess of life" in the local language of Mindanao) is a 2006 Philippine indie film directed by Sherad Anthony Sanchez.

== Plot ==
A story about an intertribal war and the threat of extinction to the Buhi tribe and its over-protective Balyan (shaman) of the Arakan Valley, North Cotabato, Mindanao.

== Cast ==
- Marilyn Roque as Unang Balyan
- Jeliete Ruca as Gigi
- Ronald Arguelles as rebel

== Awards and nominations ==
Year	Award	Category	Recipient	Result
2006	Cinema One Originals Film Festival	Best Picture	The Woven Stories of the Other	Won
2006	Best Music	Matilda (Charms Tianzon, Yvette Tunguia, Jovi Reyes, Maricor Reyes) and Popoy Landero	The Woven Stories of the Other	Nominated
2007	18th Marseille Festival of Documentary Film	The First Film Prize Award	The Woven Stories of the Other	Won
2007	Munich International Film festival	One Future Prize	The Woven Stories of the Other	Won
2007	Gawad Urian Award	Best Film		Nominated
2007	Gawad Urian Award	Best Director	Sherad Anthony Sanchez	Nominated
