= They Call Me Joy =

1997 drama film by Carlos Siguion-Reyna

- Official movie poster
- Directed by: Carlos Siguion-Reyna
- Written by: Bibeth Orteza
- Produced by: Armida Siguion-Reyna
- Starring: Rosanna Roces
- Cinematography: Marissa Florendo
- Edited by: Manet A. Dayrit
- Music by: Ryan Cayabyab
- Production company: Reyna Films
- Distributed by: Star Cinema
- Release date: January 29, 1997
- Running time: 105 minutes
- Country: Philippines
- Language: Filipino

They Call Me Joy (Filipino: Ligaya ang Itawag Mo sa Akin) is a 1997 Philippine drama film directed by Carlos Siguion-Reyna from a story and screenplay written by his wife, Bibeth Orteza. The film stars Rosanna Roces in the title role.

Produced by Reyna Films and distributed by Star Cinema, the film was theatrically released on January 29, 1997, and it became a blockbuster at the box office.

== Synopsis ==
Ligaya is a veteran prostitute whose name means "joy", and is ironically tired and unhappy with her lifestyle. Having saved enough money, she decides to leave whoring for good, but love unexpectedly comes her way in the form of a sincere and honest farmer called Poldíng. The farmer, who falls madly in love with her, is Ligaya's ticket to a decent, respectable life.

Roces' oft-quoted line from the film is "Ligaya ang itawag mo sa akin, 'yan ang trabaho ko, nagbibigáy-ligaya." ("Call me 'Joy,' that's my job, giving joy"). It is often used in a humorous context, where the speaker parodies the catty attitude of a prostitute advertising her ability to give "pleasure".

== Cast ==
- Rosanna Roces as Ligaya
- John Arcilla as Polding
- Isabel Granada as Estela
- Chanda Romero as Lolay
- Armida Siguion-Reyna as Ima
- Pen Medina as Tikyo
- Eva Darren as Gunda
- Ihman Esturco as Mayor
- Crispin Pineda as Padre Teofilo
- Myrna Castillo as Susan
- Macky Villalon as Agnes
- Rubirosa as Estela's Aunt
- Marie De Castro as Jenny
- Sammy Macairan as Abnoy

== Awards ==
Year	Awards	Category	Recipient	Result
1998	47th FAMAS Awards	Best Supporting Actress	Isabel Granada	Won
1998	16th FAP Awards	Best Music Score	Ryan Cayabyab	Won
1998	22nd Gawad Urian Awards	Best Supporting Actor	John Arcilla	Won
1998	14th PMPC Star Awards for Movies	Musical Scorer of the Year	Ryan Cayabyab	Won
1998	14th PMPC Star Awards for Movies	Movie Theme Song of the Year	"Ligaya Ang Itawag Mo Sa Akin"	Won

== 2020 unreleased remake series ==
On February 18, 2020, Filipina-Moroccan actress Ivana Alawi was officially announced to lead the main character role for the TV remake of the movie. Unfortunately, Dreamscape Entertainment canceled the TV series remake due to the effects of the COVID-19 pandemic in the Philippines and the ABS-CBN shutdown. Instead, the series was retooled by Dreamscape as La Vida Lena, starring Erich Gonzales.
