= Hihintayin Kita sa Langit =

1991 romantic drama film by Carlos Siguion-Reyna

- The poster of the restored version, released in 2017. Poster was designed by Justin Besana.
- Directed by: Carlos Siguion-Reyna
- Screenplay by: Raquel Villavicencio
- Based on: Wuthering Heights by Emily Brontë
- Produced by: Armida Siguion-Reyna
- Starring: Richard Gomez; Dawn Zulueta
- Cinematography: Romy Vitug
- Edited by: Jess Navarro
- Music by: Ryan Cayabyab
- Production company: Reyna Films
- Distributed by: Bonanza Films
- Release date: June 13, 1991
- Running time: 123 minutes
- Country: Philippines
- Language: Filipino

Hihintayin Kita sa Langit (transl. I'll Wait for You in Heaven) is a 1991 Filipino romantic drama film directed by Carlos Siguion-Reyna. The screenplay, written by Raquel Villavicencio, is loosely adapted from English novelist-poet Emily Brontë's 1847 novel Wuthering Heights and transposes the plot of the said novel from the moors of West Yorkshire to the beaches and seaside cliffs (shot in Batanes). The film stars then-real-life romantic partners, Richard Gomez and Dawn Zulueta, in their first film together as leads, modeled on the characters Heathcliff and Catherine. It co-stars Michael de Mesa, Eric Quizon, Jackie Lou Blanco, Jose Mari Avellana, and Vangie Labalan.

Produced by Reyna Films, as their first film offering, and distributed by Bonanza Films, it was theatrically released on June 13, 1991. The film was digitally restored and remastered in 4K resolution by ABS-CBN Film Restoration and Central Digital Lab and subsequently released in select theaters on February 27, 2017.

== Plot ==
Don Joaquin Salvador adopts a street urchin whom he names Gabriel after his deceased son. Gabriel becomes friends with Joaquin's daughter Carmina, but is hated by Joaquin's other son, Milo. After Milo falsely accuses Gabriel of stealing his horse, Joaquin banishes Milo to a relative in Manila. Carmina and Gabriel grow up happily together and develop a romantic relationship. After Joaquin dies from an illness, Milo assumes ownership of the Salvador estate. As part of his grudge against Gabriel, he banishes him to the stables and treats him like a servant, to Carmina's disgust.

Gabriel and Carmina sneak into a party held by their rich neighbors, the Ilustre siblings, Alan and Sandra. Carmina is injured after falling off a tree while watching the party with Gabriel, who is beaten up by Milo and his men when he tries to rescue her. Carmina is confined to the Ilustre house for two weeks, during which she is taken care of by Alan, who falls in love with her. Her absence makes Gabriel jealous of Alan, and his relationship with Carmina deteriorates. Alan proposes to Carmina, but she refuses. Gabriel eventually runs away after hearing a conversation between Carmina and her nanny, Adora, during which the former disparages Gabriel for his poverty. Carmina, who had relied on Gabriel to protect her, despairs at having to live with a lecherous Milo and accepts Alan's marriage proposal.

Gabriel spends the next three years amassing a fortune before returning to beat a gambling-addicted Milo in a card game for possession of the Salvador estate. He then retains Milo as a servant in the stables in revenge. Gabriel visits the Ilustres and tells Carmina that he still loves her. But Carmina says that she loves Alan and cannot leave him. Gabriel vows to use any means to reclaim Carmina, going as far as to seduce Sandra into falling in love with him and marrying him. A wary Alan tries to stop the marriage, leading to a fistfight with Gabriel before he reluctantly relents. As Carmina tries to convince Alan to stop the wedding, she inadvertently lets slip her continuing feelings for Gabriel and eventually asks for an annulment so that she can be with Gabriel. Feeling betrayed, Alan physically abuses her to the point where she suffers a miscarriage and attempts suicide.

Meanwhile, Gabriel and Sandra's wedding pushes through, but their marriage unravels after Gabriel inadvertently mutters Carmina's name during an intimate moment with Sandra. Gabriel is later told by Adora that Carmina is dying. Rushing to Alan's house, Gabriel reconciles with Carmina, who apologizes for not choosing to fight for their love earlier. Gabriel takes Carmina to the balcony, where they profess each other's love before the hills where they played together as children. As Alan arrives, Carmina dies in Gabriel's arms, sending the two into grief. After her funeral, Gabriel is shot by Milo and dies on top of her grave.

The Ilustres and Adora arrange for Gabriel to be buried next to Carmina, hoping that all of them will now be at peace. As the Ilustres leave, Adora says that Gabriel and Carmina have only started to live, before expressing relief at seeing the spirits of Carmina and Gabriel playing nearby.

== Cast of characters ==
Character	Actor	Equivalent character in Wuthering Heights
Gabriel Salvador	Richard Gomez; Jomari Yllana (young)	Heathcliff
Named after the deceased eldest son of the Salvador family. Gabriel used to be a street urchin in Manila until he was adopted wholeheartedly by Don Joaquin Salvador and treated as his own son. He was accepted by the whole family except Milo, who was hostile to him.
Carmina Salvador	Dawn Zulueta; Guila Alvarez (young)	Catherine Earnshaw
The only daughter of the Salvador family. She treats Gabriel as her own brother, and she loves him.
Milo Salvador	Michael de Mesa; Gio Alvarez (young)	Hindley Earnshaw
The other son of the Salvador family. He is depicted as a rebellious and aggressive man who has hostile feelings towards his adoptive brother, Gabriel.
Sandra Illustre	Jackie Lou Blanco	Isabella Linton
Alan's sister and Gabriel's suitress-later-wife.
Alan Illustre	Eric Quizon	Edgar Linton
Sandra's brother and Carmina's suitor-later-husband. He is the manager of their family-owned mango plantation.
Adora	Vangie Labalan	Nelly Dean
The trusted house helper of the Salvador family. She is a "mother figure" to Carmina, Milo, and Gabriel since her employer was a widower.
Joaquin Salvador	Jose Mari Avellana	Mr. Earnshaw
The loving patriarch of the Salvador family. He adopts Gabriel, a street urchin from Divisoria, and treats him as his own son.

== Production ==
=== Casting ===
Dawn Zulueta, who was in hibernation and considered leaving for the United States in 1990, was given another chance in a film by actress-singer-producer Armida Siguion-Reyna with the role of Carmina Salvador in the first offering of Reyna Films.

=== Filming ===
In all of the film’s 26 shooting days, only five were spent in Batanes. The rest of the shooting days were shot in Villa Escudero in Tiaong, Quezon. According to Carlos Siguion-Reyna, the film's director, all of the scenes filmed in Batanes were shot in available sunlight, with the support of reflectors, and no camera dollies. In filming the most "iconic" scene, the director and Romy Vitug, the film's cinematographer, shot the scene in slow motion by shooting at high speed. The lead actors were exhausted from running for the scene as well as the tiresome efforts of the film's staff and crew members.

With the film's story containing intimate love scenes, Zulueta agreed to do it with her on-screen partner, Richard Gomez, and stated that they are important.

=== Music ===
The film's theme song, "Hanggang sa Dulo ng Walang Hanggan", was originally composed and written by George Canseco. It was performed by Richard Reynoso and arranged by Ryan Cayabyab.

== Release ==
Hihintayin Kita sa Langit was produced by Reyna Films and distributed by Bonanza Films. The film was theatrically released in the Philippines on June 13, 1991, two days before the eruption of Mount Pinatubo. Despite the disaster, the film became a box office success.

=== Digitally restored version ===
The film was digitally restored and remastered by the ABS-CBN Film Archives in partnership with Central Digital Lab as part of their Sagip Pelikula campaign. The source element used for the film's restoration was the uncut original 35mm picture negative, which was taken from the storage of Reyna Films. The film was first scanned in 4K resolution and converted to 2K resolution for the preparation of its restoration. The image restoration took 660 actual manual hours to eliminate and address its defects, including unsteady shots, warps, missing frames, and bumps originating from the print's splice marks. For the color grading, it took 100 actual manual hours to restore the film's color and tonalities, with the assistance and supervision of the film's director and cinematographer. For restoring the film's audio, it was also supervised by the director.

It was premiered on February 27, 2017, at the Glorietta 4 Cinema in Ayala Center, Makati, Metro Manila. The premiere was attended by the film's director Carlos Siguion-Reyna; writer Raquel Villavicencio; stars Richard Gomez, Dawn Zulueta, Eric Quizon, Guila Alvarez, and Vangie Labalan; cinematographer Romy Vitug; editor Jess Navarro; and the singer of the film's theme song, Richard Reynoso. It was also attended by Richard Gomez's wife and 4th District of Leyte representative, Lucy Torres-Gomez and the director's family consisting of his wife, actress-writer Bibeth Orteza and children, actor Rafa Siguion-Reyna and Sarah Siguion-Reyna.

=== Television broadcast ===
The restored version of the film received a free-to-air television premiere on ABS-CBN and its high-definition service on November 26, 2017, as a feature presentation of its Restored Classics banner for the network's Sunday late-night presentation program Sunday's Best. According to AGB Nielsen Nationwide Urban Television Audience Measurement (NUTAM) ratings, the ABS-CBN broadcast of the film attained a nationwide rating of 1.2%, losing against GMA Network's broadcast of Manny Pacquiao's monthly drama anthology program Stories for the Soul during its first hour, attaining a 2% rating but won against Diyos at Bayan, also broadcast by GMA Network, which attained a 0.7% rating during its second and last hour.

== Reception ==
=== Critical reception ===
DJ Ramones of Reverse Delay gave a positive review of the film and described the film's story and visuals as old-fashioned, but it continues to give romantic thrills to both old and new audiences.

Indonesian film critic Bavner Donaldo rated the film 4 out of 5 stars, and he praised Carlos Siguion-Reyna's direction, the acting performances of the Richard-Dawn tandem, and Romy Vitug's photography. Although he didn't like the tragic ending, the film enchanted him, and it has been his favorite Filipino romantic drama film.

=== Accolades ===
Award-giving organization	Date of ceremony	Category	Recipient(s)	Result	Ref.
2nd Young Critics Circle Awards	January 1992	Best Achievement in Cinematography and Visual Design	Romy Vitug (cinematographer); Joey Luna (production designer)	Nominated	
2nd Young Critics Circle Awards	January 1992	Best Achievement in Film Editing	Jesus "Jess" Navarro	Nominated	
2nd Young Critics Circle Awards	January 1992	Best Achievement in Sound and Aural Orchestration	Ryan Cayabyab (musical director); Gaudencio Barredo (sound engineer)	Won	
10th FAP Awards	March 29, 1992	Best Film	Hihintayin Kita sa Langit	Nominated	
10th FAP Awards	March 29, 1992	Best Director	Carlos Siguion-Reyna	Nominated	
10th FAP Awards	March 29, 1992	Best Actor	Richard Gomez	Nominated	
10th FAP Awards	March 29, 1992	Best Supporting Actor	Michael de Mesa	Nominated	
10th FAP Awards	March 29, 1992	Best Production Design	Joey Luna	Nominated	
10th FAP Awards	March 29, 1992	Best Sound	Gaudencio Barredo	Won	
10th FAP Awards	March 29, 1992	Best Original Song	George Canseco	Won	
10th FAP Awards	March 29, 1992	Best Musical Score	Ryan Cayabyab	Won	

== Television adaptation ==
The film was adapted for television by ABS-CBN in 2012. The TV series ran from January 16 through October 24, 2012, and was top-billed by Coco Martin and Julia Montes and original stars Richard Gomez and Dawn Zulueta along with an ensemble cast.

The song "Hanggang sa Dulo ng Walang Hanggan" (performed by Richard Reynoso in the film) was also used as the program's theme song.

== See also ==
- Wuthering Heights
- List of Wuthering Heights adaptations
- The Promise (2007 film)
- Walang Hanggan (2012 TV series)
