= Reyna Films =

Film production company in the Philippines

- Type: Private
- Industry: Film production
- Founded: Manila, Philippines (1991; 35 years ago)
- Headquarters: Manila, Philippines
- Key people: Armida Siguion-Reyna (founder and executive producer); Carlos Siguion-Reyna; Bibeth Orteza
- Products: Films
- Owner: Armida Siguion-Reyna

Reyna Films was a Filipino film production company managed by Armida Siguion-Reyna and her son Carlitos Siguion-Reyna in 1991. It was known for its critically acclaimed and award-winning films such as Hihintayin Kita sa Langit and Ligaya Ang Itawag Mo Sa Akin. Reyna Films produced 13 films from 1991 to 2000. Armida Siguion-Reyna also appeared as actress, aside from being a producer, in three of her productions: Ikaw Pa Lang Ang Minahal, Inagaw Mo ang Lahat sa Akin, and Ligaya Ang Itawag Mo Sa Akin. The company has been defunct since 2000, after Azucena.

== History ==
Before this production company, Armida Siguion-Reyna already established Aawitan Kita Productions, known for the Filipino musical program Aawitan Kita. She also established PERA Productions in 1977, with only three films produced. After which, Siguion-Reyna worked as a line producer with different film productions from 1979 to 1983. In 1988, Siguion-Reyna co-produced with Viva Films a film Misis Mo, Misis Ko which turned out to be a success.

After its successful venture with Viva Films, Armida and her son Carlitos (director of Misis Mo, Misis Ko), together with writer Bibeth Orteza, decided to establish a film production company.

The debut production Hihintayin Kita sa Langit, starring Richard Gomez and Dawn Zulueta in one of their first team-up appearances, became a success and is award-winning with 18 combined awards received from FAMAS, Urian, and FAP. The next film Ikaw Pa Lang Ang Minahal in 1992, won 27 awards from the mentioned award-giving bodies and YCC.

Almost all films produced by Reyna Films were proven to be a critical success, and brought honor for the Philippines in several international film festivals. Inagaw Mo Ang Lahat sa Akin won Best Picture in the 1996 Nortel Palm Springs International Film Festival as well as Best Picture in the 1996 FAMAS awards. Ang Lalaki sa Buhay ni Selya won the Special Jury prize in the Teddy Awards of the 1998 Berlin International Film Festival, the Best Asian Film award at the 1999 Newport Beach International Film Festival, and the Special Jury prize in the 1998 Turin Gay and Lesbian International Film Festival. Kahapon, May Dalawang Bata took home the Best Foreign Film prize at the Newport Beach International Film Festival as well as the second runner-up prize in the "Air Canada" People's Choice awards in the 1999 Toronto International Film Festival. Azucena was adjudged Best Picture at the 2001 San Diego Asian-American Film Festival. While the first two productions in 1991 and 1992 were money-makers, Ligaya Ang Itawag Mo Sa Akin turned out to be a blockbuster.

However, as with local producers in the 1990s, Reyna Films encountered major problems in taxation and censorship.

Most of the films produced by Reyna Films (including co-productions with Star Cinema) are digitally restored and remastered by the ABS-CBN Film Archives. Hihintayin Kita sa Langit was the first film of the currently semi-active company to be restored by the Sagip Pelikula campaign headed by Leonardo P. Katigbak.

== Filmography ==
All of the films but one were directed by Carlitos Siguion Reyna. The film Kailangan Kita (not to be confused with the movie with the same title produced in 2002) was co-produced with Regal Films. The Christmas-themed family drama Kung Mawawala Ka Pa is directed by Jose Mari Avellana, an entry for the 1993 Metro Manila Film Festival. Richard Gomez, Dawn Zulueta, Maricel Soriano, and Tonton Gutierrez, being in the lead credits, have each appeared in three Reyna Films movies. Rosanna Roces, Ricky Davao, and Ara Mina followed with two movies each.

While no longer producing mainstream feature films, Reyna Films (now through the management of Armida's son Carlitos) made an indie film on the lives of the Tondo District in Manila. Hari ng Tondo, an independent film co-produced with APT Entertainment and M-Zet Films, is one of the entries for Cinemalaya 2014 Festival. The said film is also set to its theatrical release in late 2014.

Title	Year	Cast	Director	Genre
Hihintayin Kita sa Langit	1991	Richard Gomez, Dawn Zulueta, Eric Quizon, Jackie Lou Blanco, Michael de Mesa	Carlitos Siguion-Reyna	Romance, Drama
Ikaw Pa Lang ang Minahal	1992	Richard Gomez, Maricel Soriano, Charito Solis, Eddie Gutierrez	Carlitos Siguion-Reyna	Romance, Drama
Kailangan Kita (co-produced with Regal Films)	1993	Gabby Concepcion, Gretchen Barretto, Edu Manzano, Cristina Gonzales	Carlitos Siguion-Reyna	Romance, Drama
Saan Ka Man Naroroon	1993	Richard Gomez, Dawn Zulueta	Carlitos Siguion-Reyna	Romance, Drama
Kung Mawawala Ka Pa	1993	Christopher de Leon, Dawn Zulueta, Amy Austria	Jose Mari Avellana	Family Drama
Inagaw Mo Ang Lahat Sa Akin (Harvest Home)	1995	Maricel Soriano, Snooky Serna, Eric Quizon, Tirso Cruz III	Carlitos Siguion-Reyna	Drama
Abot-Kamay Ang Pangarap (Elena's Redemption)	1996	Maricel Soriano, Tonton Gutierrez, Dina Bonnevie	Carlitos Siguion-Reyna	Drama
Ligaya Ang Itawag Mo Sa Akin (They Call Me Joy)	1997	Rosanna Roces, John Arcilla, Isabel Granada	Carlitos Siguion-Reyna	Romance, Drama, Erotica
Ang Lalake Sa Buhay ni Selya (The Man in Her Life)	1997	Rosanna Roces, Ricky Davao, Gardo Versoza	Carlitos Siguion-Reyna	Romance, Drama, Gay-themed
Tatlo Magkasalo (Three)	1998	Ara Mina, Tonton Gutierrez, Rita Avila, Gina Alajar	Carlitos Siguion-Reyna	Romance, Drama, Gay-themed
Kahapon May Dalawang Bata (Yesterday Children)	1999	Ara Mina, Tonton Gutierrez, Jennifer Sevilla, Carlo Aquino	Carlitos Siguion-Reyna	Drama
Azucena (Dog Food)	2000	Alessandra De Rossi, Ricky Davao, Glydel Mercado	Carlitos Siguion-Reyna	Drama
Hari ng Tondo (Where I am King) (a Cinemalaya entry) (with M-Zet Films and APT Entertainment)	2014	Robert Arevalo, Liza Lorena, Aiza Seguerra	Carlitos Siguion-Reyna	Independent film, drama, comedy
