= Armida Siguion-Reyna =

Filipina actress and singer (1930–2019)

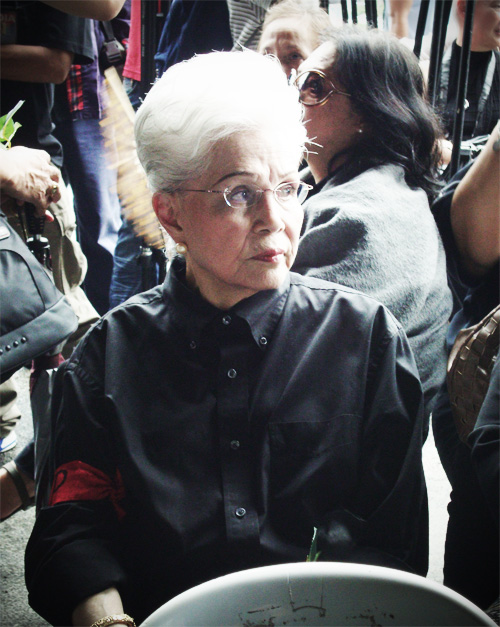
- Reyna at the National Artist award protest in August 7, 2009, photograph by Ofelia T. Sta. Maria of The Philippine Online Chronicles

Chairperson of the Movie and Television Review and Classification Board
- In office June 30, 1998 – January 20, 2001
- President: Joseph Estrada
- Preceded by: Jesus C. Sison
- Succeeded by: Nicanor Tiongson (acting)

Personal details
- Born: Armida Ponce-Enrile y Liwanag; 4 November 1930 Malabon, Rizal, Philippine Islands
- Died: 11 February 2019 (aged 88) Makati, Philippines
- Party: PMP (2001)
- Spouse: Leonardo Siguion-Reyna (m. 1951; died 2010)
- Relatives: Juan Ponce Enrile (half-brother)

Armida P. de Siguion-Reyna (born Armida Ponce-Enrile; November 4, 1930 – February 11, 2019) was a Filipina singer, film and stage actress, producer and television show host. She was the chairperson of the Movie and Television Review and Classification Board during the Estrada administration from 1998 to 2001.

== Early life and education ==
Armida Siguion-Reyna was born as Armida Liwanag Ponce Enrile on November 4, 1930, in Malabon, the daughter of Alfonso Ponce Enrile, her Spanish mestizo father who was a lawyer and regional politician, and Purita Liwanag, her mother who was one of the early graduates of the University of the Philippines College of Music. Siguion-Reyna spent her childhood with her parents and siblings in their house in Malabon. She studied at the Far Eastern University and Philippine Women's University, which are both in Manila. She also studied at the United States for her high school and college education. She completed high school at Academy of St. Joseph in New York, although, she did not finish her college studies at the Georgian Court University in New Jersey after being broken-hearted.

Her sister is artist Irma Potenciano, while her half-brother is politician Juan Ponce Enrile.

== Career ==
=== Theatrical roles ===
In the world of operas, Siguion-Reyna performed lead singing roles in Lucia de Lammermoor, Rigoletto, La Traviata, I Pagliacci, The Merry Widow, and the zarzuela Ang Mestiza (The Mestiza).

=== Television ===
Siguion-Reyna was the presenter for the television programmes "Cooking Atbp." ("Cooking etc.") and the award-winning "Áawitan Kita" ("I Will Sing for You"). "Áawitan Kita" aired for over 30 years and was one of longest-running musical television shows in the Philippines.

=== Music ===
Siguion-Reyna recorded musical albums such as the two volumes of "Aawitan Kita" (Villar Records), "Armida" (Dyna Music), and "Sa Lungkot at Saya... Aawitan Kita" ("In Sadness and Happiness... I Will Sing For You," Viva Records). In 2003, she released the album Pop Lola (Viva Records). The album includes the track "Tagubilin at Habilin", with music composed by National Artist Ryan Cayabyab.

=== Film ===
In 1975, Siguion-Reyna was awarded best supporting actress during the Bacolod Film Festival for her performance in the film "Sa Pagitan ng Dalawang Langit" ("In Between Two Heavens"). Later on she would be well known for collaborations with big names actresses such as Alma Moreno and a kontrabida (villain) to actresses Vilma Santos and Nora Aunor in several films. She is well known for also co-producing films with her son and having Maricel Soriano and Rosanna Roces in films and Dawn Zulueta these actresses have been in two films of Siguion-Reyna.

==== Producer ====
As a producer, Siguion-Reyna produced and starred in her own 16-mm film musicals entitled "Dung-aw," "Lakambini," "Supremo" (on the life on Andrés Bonifacio), "Pagpatak ng Ulan" ("When The Rain Falls"), and "Sisa." She had two film production companies. Her Pera Films company produced the movies "Laruang Apoy" ("Playing Fire") and "Bilanggong Birhen" ("Jailed Virgin"). She managed Reyna Films Company with her son Carlitos, who was a two-time award recipient.

=== As a public servant ===
During the Presidency of Joseph Estrada, Siguion-Reyna was appointed as the chairperson of the Movie and Television Review and Classification Board (MTRCB) in 1998. She was known to be an advocate of freedom of speech and artistic liberties in film. Even before she became the chairperson of MTRCB, she fought against censorship and together with peers like Lino Brocka, Behn Cervantes and Ishmael Bernal, they had protested the actions of Siguion-Reyna's predecessors, specifically Manuel Morato and Henrietta Mendez.

When she was MTRCB's chair, her board members consisted of anti-censorship people. They were lenient in rating films to be shown publicly in theaters. Though, she was criticized for being biased on film produced by her own production outfit and by her friends. She countered her critics and said that the board did not grant permits to films showing purely sexual content and thus, the films were given X-rating, which means that those films were not suitable to be shown in cinemas.

Her term ended in 2001 after Estrada was ousted through the Second EDSA Revolution. She later ran for representative of the 1st district of Makati under Pwersa ng Masang Pilipino, but lost to former Press Secretary Teodoro Locsin Jr.

== Death ==
Siguion-Reyna died of cancer in Makati at the age of 88, on February 11, 2019.

== Filmography ==
=== Film ===
Year	Title	Role
1939	Yaman Ng Mahirap	Unnamed (first film appearance as an extra)
1973	Babalik Ka Rin	
1975	Dung-Aw	Gabriela Silang
1975	Sa Pagitan ng Dalawang Langit	
1976	Usigin ang Maysala	
1977	Mga Bilanggong Birhen	Felipa
1977	Bianong Bulag	Biano’s Mother
1978	Atsay	Mrs. Yulo
1980	Kakabakaba Ka Ba?	Madame Lily
1980	Pag-ibig Na Walang Dangal	
1981	Jag Rodnar	Armida de Jesus
1982	Batch '81	Sid's mother
1983	Paano Ba ang Mangarap?	Señora Francia Monteverde
1984	Basag Ang Pula	Nida Rivera
1984	Somewhere	Doña Corazon Morena
1985	Partida	Doña Lucila
1985	Kailan Sasabihing Mahal Kita?	Señora Amelia Abelardo
1985	Till We Meet Again	Señora Rosario San Victories
1986	I Love You, Mama, I Love You, Papa	Doña Aurora Villena
1986	Inday, Inday sa Balitaw	Isabel Pabustan
1986	Magdusa Ka!	Doña Perla Doliente
1987	Salamangkero	Mikula
1988	Huwag Mong Itanong Kung Bakit	Doña Elvira Cuevas
1988	Ibulong Mo sa Diyos	Portia Quijano
1988	Hati Tayo sa Magdamag	Doña Concha Revilla
1989	Barbi: Maid in the Philippines	Señora Elvira
1989	Wanted: Pamilya Banal	Doña Marissa Banal
1990	Nagsimula sa Puso	Mrs. Fernandez
1990	Isabel Aquino: I Want to Live	Mrs. Rodriguez
1991	Ang Totoong Buhay ni Pacita M.	Mrs. Estrella
1991	Una Kang Naging Akin	Doña Margarita Soriano
1991	Shake, Rattle & Roll III	Mrs. Redoblado
1992	Ikaw Ang Lahat Sa Akin	Cesar's mother
1992	Ikaw Pa Lang Ang Minahal	Caridad
1995	Harvest Home	Almeda
1996	Ligaya ang Itawag Mo sa Akin	Ima
2002	9 Mornings	Lola Meding
2003	Filipinas	Florencia Filipinas
2003	Xerex	Juanita
2009	Fuchsia	Juana
2012	Bwakaw	Alicia

=== Television ===
Year	Title	Role	Ref.
1970–2005	Aawitan Kita	Herself/performer	
2001–2002	Sa Puso Ko, Iingatan Ka	Lourdes Lizandro	
2002–2003	Kung Mawawala Ka	Romina Salgado	
