= Christopher de Leon on screen and stage =

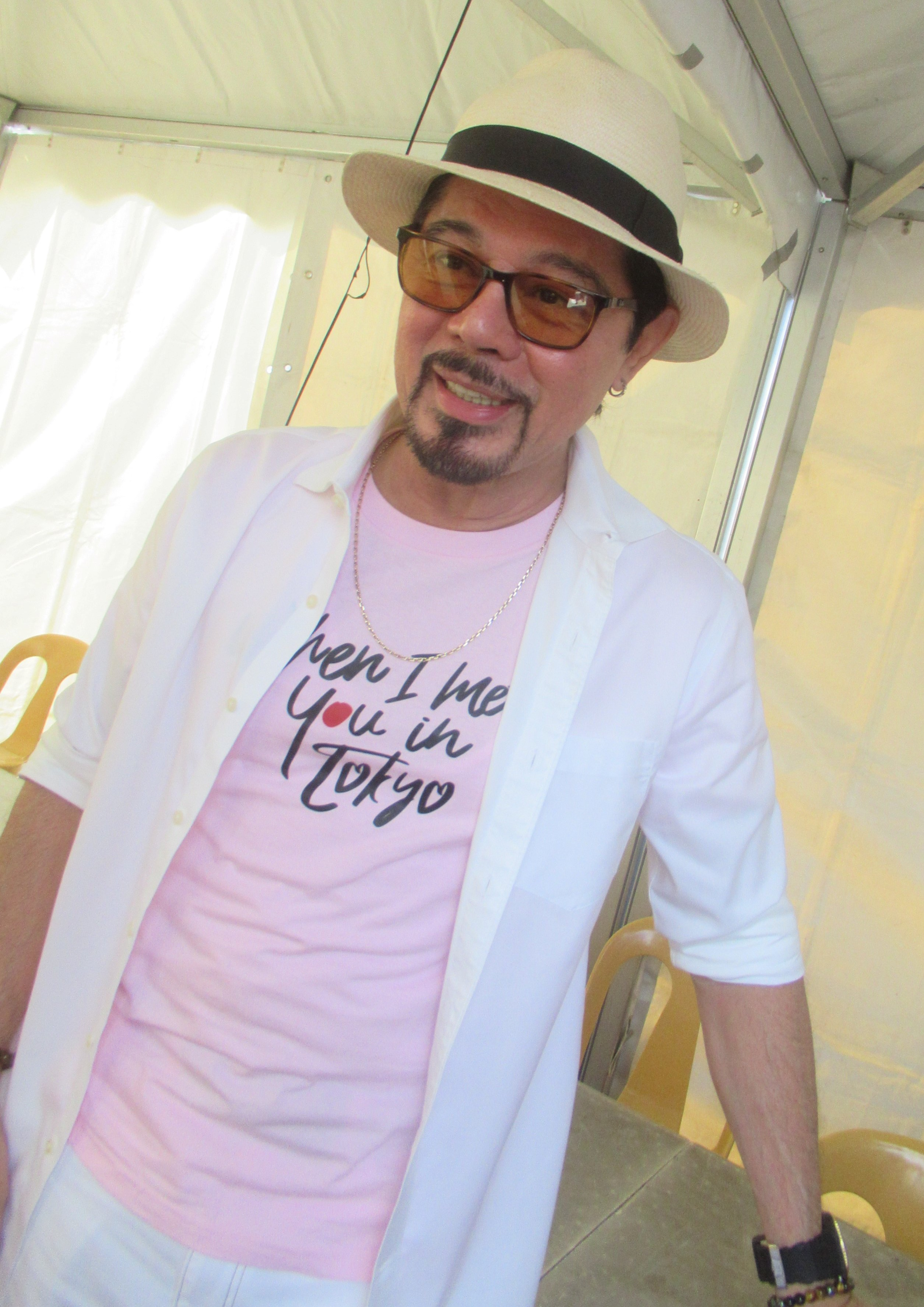
De Leon at the Metro Manila Film Festival Parade of Stars event in 2023

Christopher de Leon is a Filipino actor and filmmaker who has had an extensive career in film, television and stage. He made his screen debut in Lino Brocka's Tinimbang Ka Ngunit Kulang (1974), won his first acting award for Best Actor at the FAMAS, and has since appeared in 160 motion pictures. He received wider recognition for his roles in the historical period films Banaue: Stairway to the Sky (1975), Tatlong Taong Walang Diyos (1976), and Ganito Kami Noon... Paano Kayo Ngayon? (1976), winning his second Best Actor at the FAMAS for the latter. In 1978, De Leon played a cheating husband in Ishmael Bernal's Ikaw ay Akin with Nora Aunor and Vilma Santos, earning him his first Gawad Urian for Best Actor.

De Leon established himself as a leading actor in the following years. In 1982, he starred in the mystery drama Haplos, winning Best Actor at the Metro Manila Film Festival. He received Best Actor nominations at the FAMAS for his performances in Relasyon (1982), Broken Marriage (1983), God... Save Me! (1985), and Maging Akin Ka Lamang (1987), winning one for his portrayal of an abusive husband in the romantic drama Kapag Napagod ang Puso (1988). De Leon won Best Actor at the Luna Awards for two consecutive years for his starring roles in the thriller Biktima (1990) and Ipagpatawad Mo (1991). His performances in Gumapang Ka sa Lusak (1990) and Gaano Kita Kamahal (1993) also earned him Movie Actor of the Year wins at the Star Awards for Movies. In 1996, De Leon starred in the family drama Madrasta opposite Sharon Cuneta. It became Star Cinema's highest grossing film at that point, earning over ₱70 million during its first 10-day run at the box office. In 1999, he played a crime syndicate leader in the thriller drama Bulaklak ng Maynila, winning Best Actor at the Metro Manila Film Festival and Luna Awards.

De Leon also ventured hosting and presented the game show Who Wants to Be a Millionaire? (2000). In 2003, De Leon starred in the romantic comedy Pangarap Ko Ang Ibigin Ka opposite Regine Velasquez. The film competed at the Manila Tagalog Film Festival and became the highest-grossing film among six other entries at the film festival. Further critical acclaim followed with his starring roles in Mano Po III: My Love (2004) and Magkaibigan (2008), winning Best Actor trophies at the Metro Manila Film Festival. In 2011, he played a senior figure in the family drama Sa 'Yo Lamang. De Leon also played notable supporting roles in When Love Begins (2011), El Presidente (2012), Across the Crescent Moon (2017) and On the Job 2: The Missing 8 (2023).

On stage, De Leon has been involved in four musical productions. He began performing in the early 1970s, portraying Jesus in the rock musical Godspell. It was followed by starring roles in They're Playing Our Song (1981) and Alitaptap sa Gabing Mailap (1985). In 2013, he produced the rock musical Lorenzo. On television, De Leon has since played major roles in soap operas as early as the 2000s. He was cast in a number of dramatic roles in Ang Iibigin ay Ikaw (2002), Hanggang Kailan (2004), Kahit Isang Saglit (2008), Ikaw Lamang (2014), Beautiful Strangers (2015), Sana Dalawa ang Puso (2018), Love Thy Woman (2020), Lolong (2022) and Batang Quiapo (2023). De Leon's directorial projects include Halimaw sa Banga (1986), Huwag Mong Salingin ang Sugat Ko (1991) and When I Met You in Tokyo (2023), as well as episodes from drama anthologies.

== Film ==
Key
†	Denotes films that have not yet been released

=== 1970s ===
Christopher de Leon's film credits with year of release, film titles and roles
Year	Title	Role	Notes	Ref(s)
1974	Tinimbang Ka Ngunit Kulang	Junior		
1975	Banaue: Stairway to the Sky	Sadek		
1975	Hello... Goodnight... Goodbye		Episode 2 ("Goodnight")	
1975	Kahit ang Mundo'y Magunaw			
1975	Batu-Bato sa Langit	Cris Buenaventura	Executive Producer	
1976	Ang Katumbas Ay Buhay	Mario		
1976	Hide and Seek			
1976	Relax Lang, Mama ... Sagot Kita			
1976	Ganito Kami Noon... Paano Kayo Ngayon?	Nicolas "Kulas" Ocampo		
1976	Tatlong Taong Walang Diyos	Masugi	Executive Producer	
1977	Si Boyet, Si Hilda atbp.	Himself	Documentary	
1977	Tisoy!		Executive Producer	
1977	Masikip, Maluwang... Paraisong Parisukat			
1977	Masarap, Masakit ang Umibig	Alonzo		
1977	Kung Mangarap Ka't Magising	Joey		
1977	My Brother, My Wife			
1978	Nakawin Natin Ang Bawat Sandali	Benjamin		
1978	Topo-Topo Barega			
1978	Mahal Mo, Mahal Ko	Chris		
1978	Mga Mata ni Angelita	Lover		
1978	Sapagkat Kami'y Tao Lamang, Part 2	The husband		
1978	Kukulog, Kikidlat sa Tanghaling Tapat			
1978	Kung Kaya Mo... Kaya Ko Rin	Ramon		
1978	Lagi Na Lamang Ba Akong Babae?	Modesto		
1978	Disco Fever			
1978	Ikaw Ay Akin	Rex Aguilar		
1978	Drigo Garrote: Jai Alai King	Rodrigo Garrote		
1979	Darna, Kuno?	Chris	Special appearance	
1979	Bakit May Pag-ibig Pa?			
1979	Magkaribal	Eric Guerrero		
1979	Sa Putik Ihuhugas ay Dugo			
1979	Pinay, American Style	Chris		
1979	Annie Batungbakal			
1979	Isang Milyon At Isang Kasalanan			
1979	Ang Alamat ni Julian Makabayan	Julian Makabayan		
1979	Gusto Kita Mahal Ko Siya			
1979	Kasal-kasalan, Bahay-bahayan	Abel		

=== 1980s ===
Christopher de Leon's film credits with year of release, film titles and roles
Year	Title	Role	Notes	Ref(s)
1980	Saan... Sino... Paano???	Himself	Documentary	
1980	Kasal?	Joel		
1980	Iwahig	Alex Zaragosa		
1980	Kakabakaba Ka Ba?	Johnny		
1980	Taga sa Panahon			
1980	Aguila	Mari L. Aguila		
1980	Sugat sa Ugat	Ramon		
1980	Kung Ako'y Iiwan Mo			
1981	Kamakalawa	Kauing		
1981	Showbiz Scandal			
1981	Pakawalan Mo Ako	Freddie		
1981	I Confess			
1981	Dirty Games			
1981	Dalaga si Misis, Binata si Mister			
1981	Karma	Edwin	Special appearance	
1982	Palipat-lipat, Papalit-palit			
1982	Tinimbang ang Langit	Joel		
1982	Relasyon	Emil		
1982	Malikot	Zen Jamir		
1982	Anak	Alfred		
1982	No Other Love			
1982	Sinasamba Kita	Jerry		
1982	Cain and Abel	Ellis		
1982	Haplos	Al		
1983	Love Birds			
1983	Paano Ba ang Mangarap?	Eric		
1983	Broken Marriage	Rene		
1983	Minsan Pa Nating Hagkan ang Nakaraan	Rod		
1983	Bad Bananas on the Silver Screen	Errol	Producer	
1984	Kung Mahawi Man ang Ulap	Rustan		
1984	Akin ang Iyong Katawan	Antonio Cuaresma		
1984	Sampung Ahas ni Eva			
1985	Kapag Puso'y Sinugatan	Ramon		
1985	Bituing Walang Ningning	Nico Escobar		
1985	Hindi Nahahati ang Langit	Noel		
1985	Kay Dali ng Kahapon, Ang Bagal ng Bukas			
1985	Beloved	Dindo Tuason		
1985	Kailan Sasabihing Mahal Kita	Jake Abelardo		
1985	God... Save Me!	Homer		
1986	Huwag Mo Kaming Isumpa	Francis		
1986	Magdusa Ka!	Rod		
1986	Halimaw sa Banga		Director	
1987	Ayokong Tumungtong sa Lupa	Dodong		
1987	Maging Akin Ka Lamang	Andy Abrigo		
1987	Walang Karugtong ang Nakaraan			
1988	Kapag Napagod ang Puso	Adrian		
1988	Magkano ang Iyong Dangal?	Paolo		
1988	3 Mukha ng Pag-ibig	Olan		
1989	Bakit Iisa Lamang ang Puso?			
1989	Babangon Ako't Dudurugin Kita	Alfred		
1989	Imortal	Josef Alfonso / Nicholas Alfonso-Lopez / Basil Alonso-Lopez		

=== 1990s ===
Christopher de Leon's film credits with year of release, film titles and roles
Year	Title	Role	Notes	Ref(s)
1990	Biktima	Jing Aureus		
1990	My Other Woman	Benjo Santiago		
1990	Gumapang Ka sa Lusak	Levi		
1990	Higit na Matimbang ang Dugo			
1991	Kislap sa Dilim	Nitoy		
1991	Makiusap Ka sa Diyos	Vince		
1991	Ipagpatawad Mo	Mike		
1991	Huwag Mong Salingin ang Sugat Ko	Delfin	Director	
1991	Dinampot ka Lang sa Putik	Edmond		
1991	Onyong Majikero	Melencio Fernando	Special appearance	
1992	Hiram na Mukha	Dr. Hugo Roldan		
1992	Mahal Kita, Walang Iba	Alex		
1992	Adventures of Gary Leon at Kuting	Agno		
1993	Sana'y Ikaw na Nga	Kevin		
1993	Divine Mercy: Sa Buhay ni Sister Faustina	Karl		
1993	Dahil Mahal Kita: The Dolzura Cortez Story	Paolo		
1993	Kung Mawawala Ka Pa	Tony		
1993	Gaano Kita Kamahal	Rolly Suclad		
1994	Bakit Ngayon Ka Lang?	Ramon		
1994	Nag-iisang Bituin	Phillip Caballero		
1994	Vampira	Arman		
1994	Paano Na? Sa Mundo ni Janet	Gaston		
1995	Eskapo	Eugenio López, Jr.		
1995	Sa Ngalan ng Pag-ibig	Spanky		
1996	Sa Aking Mga Kamay	Joven dela Rosa		
1996	Kristo	Dismas		
1996	Wanted: Perfect Mother	Dante Zulueta		
1996	Madrasta	Edward		
1997	Hanggang Ngayon Ika'y Minamahal	Leonardo Perez		
1997	Halik	Simon		
1997	Nasaan ang Puso	Dave		
1998	Ama Namin	Fr. Rico / Ka Marco		
1998	Tumutol Man ang Tadhana			
1998	Pahiram Kahit Sandali	Andy		
1998	Sambahin ang Ngalan Mo	Daniel		
1999	Katawan	Carlo		
1999	Wansapanataym: The Movie	Gary Azurin		
1999	Bulaklak ng Maynila	Timo		
1999	Higit Pa sa Buhay Ko	Alex		

=== 2000s ===
Christopher de Leon's film credits with year of release, film titles and roles
Year	Title	Role	Notes	Ref(s)
2000	Pedro Penduko: The Return of the Comeback	Amang	Cameo	
2000	Tunay na Mahal	Tom		
2000	Ika-13 Kapitulo	David		
2000	Yakapin Mo ang Umaga	Charlie		
2000	Sugatang Puso	Noel		
2001	Alas Dose	Remo Doce		
2001	American Adobo	Mike		
2002	Mahal Kita, Final Answer	Himself	Cameo, uncredited	
2002	Dekada '70	Julian Bartolome		
2002	Magkapatid	Bobby Reyes		
2003	Pangarap Ko ang Ibigin Ka	Raffy		
2003	Mano Po 2: My Home	Antonio "Tony" Chan		
2004	Mano Po III: My Love	Michael Lim		
2005	Blue Moon	Rod Pineda		
2006	Nasaan si Francis?	Rocky	Producer	
2006	Tulay			
2007	Faces of Love	Don Arcadio		
2008	Banal	Major Miguel Sagala		
2008	When Love Begins	Paco Valmonte		
2008	Magkaibigan	Atoy		
2009	Mano Po 6: A Mother's Love	Alfonso Uy		

=== 2010s ===
Christopher de Leon's film credits with year of release, film titles and roles
Year	Title	Role	Notes	Ref(s)
2010	Sa 'yo Lamang	Franco Alvero		
2011	Catch Me, I'm in Love	President Enrique Rodriguez		
2012	Flames of Love			
2012	El Presidente	Gen. Antonio Luna		
2014	Sa Ngalan ng Ama, Ina, at mga Anak	Ka Romeo		
2015	Tragic Theater	Miguel Sanchez Agcaoli		
2016	Dukot	Manong Johnny		
2016	The Escort	Gary Montenilla		
2017	Across the Crescent Moon	Karim Misani		
2017	Kamandag ng Droga			
2017	Smaller and Smaller Circles	Philip Mapa		
2018	Kasal	Mayor Ernesto Cordero		

=== 2020s ===
Christopher de Leon's film credits with year of release, film titles and roles
Year	Title	Role	Notes	Ref(s)
2021	On the Job: The Missing 8	Arnel Pangan		
2023	Kahit Maputi na ang Buhok Ko	Tomas		
2023	Moro	Kamad		
2023	When I Met You in Tokyo	Joey	Associate Director	
2026	58th	N/A	First animation role	
TBA	Knock Three Times †			

== Television ==
Key
†	Denotes shows that have not yet been aired

Christopher de Leon's television credits with year of release, show titles and roles
Year	Title	Role	Notes	Ref(s)
1986	Goin' Bananas	Himself		
1992	Maalaala Mo Kaya		Episode: "Mustang"	
1993	Star Drama Presents			
1994	Maalaala Mo Kaya		Episode: "Tropeo at Medalyon"	
1998	Hiwalay kung Hiwalay Daw?	Bo Paraiso		
2000	Who Wants to Be a Millionaire?	Host		
2001	Maalaala Mo Kaya		Episode: "Crib"	
2002	Bugso	Husband	Director	
2002	Ang Iibigin ay Ikaw	Lemuel Verder		
2003	Ang Iibigin ay Ikaw Parin	Lemuel Verder		
2003	All Together Now	DJ Blue/ Tong		
2003	StarStruck	Council member		
2004	Hanggang Kailan	Dado		
2005	Now and Forever: Agos	Armando		
2005	Darna	Dr. Zombie		
2006	Maalaala Mo Kaya	Bong	Episode: "Palamig"	
2006	Maging Sino Ka Man	Don Fidel Madrigal		
2007	Maging Sino Ka Man: Ang Pagbabalik	Don Fidel Madrigal		
2007	Magpakailanman	Antonio	Episode: "Sa Aking Muling Pagkabuhay"	
2007	Pangarap na Bituin	Carlo Gomez		
2008	Kahit Isang Saglit	Anthony Mondragon		
2009	May Bukas Pa	Marcelito "Lito" Azarcon	Guest appearance	
2009	Lovers in Paris	George Aranaz		
2009	Celebrity Duets: Philippine Edition	Himself		
2009	Sana Ngayong Pasko	Gordon Dionisio		
2009	Maalaala Mo Kaya	Sarhento	Episode: "Medal for Valor" Episode Director	
2009	Maalaala Mo Kaya	Enrique	Episode: "Diary"	
2010	SRO Cinemaserye: Meet The Fathers	Father Alejandro		
2010	Panday Kids	Guro		
2010	Ilumina	Frederico Salcedo		
2010	Jillian: Namamasko Po	Dante Molina		
2010	Maalaala Mo Kaya	Buloy	Episode: "Gitara"	
2011	Bantatay	Bartolome Sison		
2011	Captain Barbell	Nero		
2011	100 Days to Heaven	Ronaldo Quinio		
2011	Sa Ngalan ng Ina	Jose "Pepe" Ilustre		
2012	Dahil sa Pag-Ibig	Leo Valderama		
2012	Kung Ako'y Iiwan Mo	Manny Raymundo		
2012	Luna Blanca	Luis Buenaluz		
2012	Pahiram ng Sandali	Phillip Reyes		
2012	Maalaala Mo Kaya	Toto	Episode: "School Uniform"	
2013	Kidlat	Vincent Megaton Sr.		
2013	Misibis Bay	Anthony Cadiz		
2013	Muling Buksan ang Puso	Anton "El Patron" Silvestre / Anton Cabigas		
2014	Magpakailanman	Tatay Julian	Episode: "Pabrika ng Bata"	
2014	The Legal Wife	Javier Santiago, Sr.		
2014	Ikaw Lamang	Franco Hidalgo		
2015	Beautiful Strangers	Ronaldo Castillo		
2015	Magpakailanman	Adult Jesus	Episode: "Ama Namin: The Jesus Boy Parungao Story	
2016	Little Nanay	August "Tisoy" D. Castañeda		
2016	FPJ's Ang Probinsyano	Michael "Mike" Alonzo		
2016	Ang Panday	Lizardo		
2016	Alyas Robin Hood	Jose De Jesus, Sr.		
2016	Maalaala Mo Kaya	Alan	Episode: "Alkansya"	
2016	Once Again	Ricardo Soriano	Cameo	
2017	Kambal, Karibal	Emmanuel De Villa		
2017	Maalaala Mo Kaya	Lino	Episode: "Saklay"	
2017	Maalaala Mo Kaya	Indong	Episode: "Tulay"	
2018	Sana Dalawa ang Puso	Juancho Laureano		
2019	TODA One I Love	Enrique Sixto		
2019	Maalaala Mo Kaya	Edgardo Angara	Episode: "Family Portrait"	
2020	Love Thy Woman	Adam Wong		
2021	I Can See You: The Lookout	Robert Penuliar	Episode: "The Lookout"	
2021	Huwag Kang Mangamba	Elias Arcilla		
2021	On the Job	Arnel Pangan	Cameo	
2022	Lolong	Governor Armando Banson		
2022	Magpakailanman	Fidel Nacion	Episode: "Sa Ngalan ng Anak: The Fidel Madrideo Nacion Story"	
2022	Tadhana	Isaiah	Episode: "Babawiin Ko Ang Langit"	
2023	Cattleya Killer	Joven dela Rosa		
2023	Fit Check: Confessions of an Ukay Queen	Michael		
2023–2026	FPJ's Batang Quiapo	Ramon Montenegro		

== Stage ==
Year	Title	Role	Ref.
1970s	Godspell	Jesus	
1981	They're Playing Our Song		
1985	Alitaptap sa Gabing Mailap	Randle McMurphy	
2013	Lorenzo	Producer	

== See also ==
- List of awards and nominations received by Christopher de Leon
