= List of awards and nominations received by Christopher de Leon =

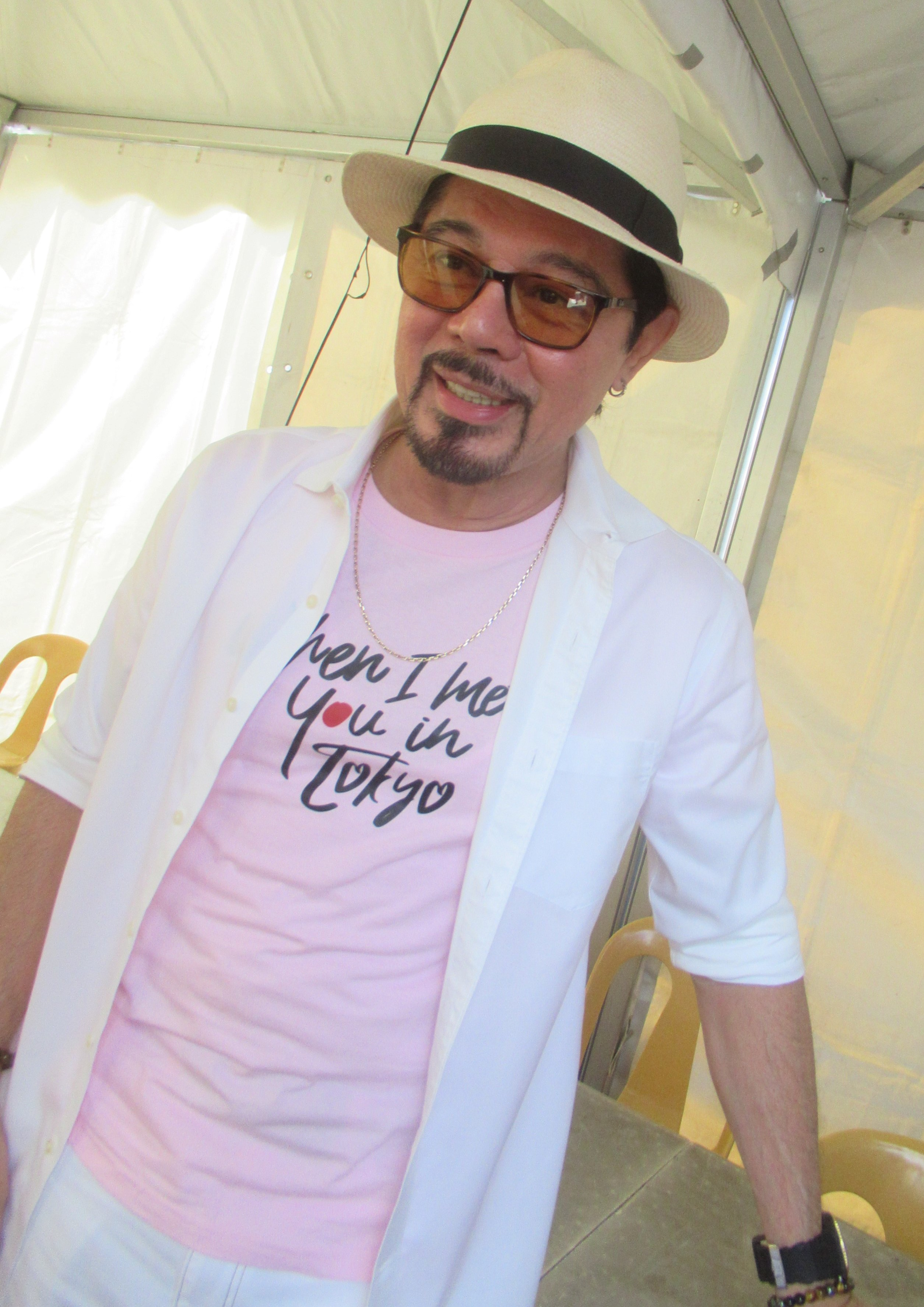
De Leon at the Metro Manila Film Festival Parade of Stars event in 2023

Christopher de Leon is a Filipino actor who has received a great number of awards and nominations for his work in film and television. In 1991, he became the second actor to win "Best Actor" in all major award-giving bodies in the Philippines, achieving Grand Slam for his performances in Biktima (1990) and My Other Woman (1990). He has received numerous honorary accolades including the FAMAS Circle of Excellence Award in 2005, a star on the Eastwood City Walk of Fame in 2006, the Lino Brocka Lifetime Achievement Award in 2008 and the Legend Award from the Cinema One Originals Digital Film Festival in 2009. In 2007, Philippine Daily Inquirer named De Leon among the best Filipino actors of all time.

At age 19, De Leon won his first acting award for his debut film, Tinimbang ka Ngunit Kulang, where he won Best Actor at the 22nd FAMAS Awards, becoming the youngest actor to win in that category. He has since tallied a total of 18 nominations for Best Actor at the FAMAS Awards, taking home four more wins in the succeeding years for his work in Ganito Kami Noon... Paano Kayo Ngayon? (1976), Kapag Napagod ang Puso (1988), My Other Woman (1990) and Ipagpatawad Mo (1991). At the Metro Manila Film Festival, De Leon has won seven Best Actor trophies for his work in Ganito Kami Noon... Paano Kayo Ngayon? (1976), Haplos (1982), Imortal (1989), Nasaan ang Puso (1997), Bulaklak ng Maynila (1999), Mano Po III: My Love (2004) and Magkaibigan (2008). He is the most awarded Filipino actor in the Best Actor category at the MMFF history.

In 1993, De Leon became the third actor to be inducted into the FAMAS Hall of Fame, joining Fernando Poe Jr., Eddie Garcia and Joseph Estrada as the only inductees in the Best Actor category. In 2019, he was inducted into the MMFF Hall of Fame, joining Anthony Alonzo and Cesar Montano as the only male inductees at the film festival. With his thirteenth Best Actor nomination for Dekada '70 in 2003, De Leon became the most nominated actor at the Gawad Urian Awards. (Note: De Leon is the most nominated actor at the Gawad Urian Awards history for "Best Actor" category.) He has won Best Actor twice for his roles in Ikaw ay Akin (1977) and My Other Woman (1990).

== Awards and nominations ==
Awards and nominations received by Christopher de Leon
Award (Note: Awards, festivals, honors and other miscellaneous organizations are listed in alphabetical order.)	Year (Note: Indicates the year of ceremony. Each year is linked to the article about the awards held that year, wherever possible.)	Category	Nominated work	Result	Ref.
ALTA Media Icon Awards	2019	Icon Award for Film and Television	Himself	Won	
Box Office Entertainment Awards	1997	Box Office King	Madrasta	Won	
Box Office Entertainment Awards	2009	Film Actor of the Year	Magkaibigan	Won	
Box Office Entertainment Awards	2020	All-time Favorite Actor	Love Thy Woman	Won	
Box Office Entertainment Awards	2024	Corazon Samaniego Lifetime Achievement Award	When I Met You in Tokyo	Won	
Catholic Mass Media Awards	1989	Best Actor	Magkano Ang Iyong Dangal?	Nominated	
Catholic Mass Media Awards	1992	Best Actor	Relasyon	Won	
Catholic Mass Media Awards	2001	Best Actor	My Other Woman	Won	
Cinema One Originals Digital Film Festival	2009	Legend Award	Himself	Won	
Eastwood City Walk of Fame	2006	Inductee	Himself	Won	
FAMAS Awards	1975	Best Actor	Tinimbang ka Ngunit Kulang	Won	
FAMAS Awards	1976	Best Actor	Banaue: Stairway to the Sky	Nominated	
FAMAS Awards	1977	Best Actor	Ganito Kami Noon... Paano Kayo Ngayon?	Won	
FAMAS Awards	1978	Best Actor	Masarap, Masakit ang Umibig	Nominated	
FAMAS Awards	1979	Best Actor	Lagi na Lamang ba Akong Babae?	Nominated	
FAMAS Awards	1980	Best Actor	Ang Alamat ni Julian Makabayan	Nominated	
FAMAS Awards	1981	Best Actor	Taga sa Panahon	Nominated	
FAMAS Awards	1981	Best Actor	Aguila	Nominated	
FAMAS Awards	1982	Best Actor	Pakawalan Mo Ako	Nominated	
FAMAS Awards	1983	Best Actor	Relasyon	Nominated	
FAMAS Awards	1984	Best Actor	Broken Marriage	Nominated	
FAMAS Awards	1986	Best Actor	God ...Save Me!	Nominated	
FAMAS Awards	1988	Best Actor	Maging Akin Ka Lamang	Nominated	
FAMAS Awards	1989	Best Actor	Kapag Napagod ang Puso	Won	
FAMAS Awards	1990	Best Actor	Imortal	Nominated	
FAMAS Awards	1991	Best Actor	My Other Woman	Won	
FAMAS Awards	1992	Best Actor	Ipagpatawad Mo	Won	
FAMAS Awards	1992	Best Director	Huwag mong Salingin ang Sugat Ko	Nominated	
FAMAS Awards	1993	Hall of Famer (Note: Inducted into the FAMAS Hall of Fame in the "Best Actor" category)	Himself	Won	
FAMAS Awards	1998	Best Actor	Nasaan ang Puso	Nominated	
FAMAS Awards	2005	Circle of Excellence	Himself	Won	
FAMAS Awards	2008	Best Supporting Actor	Banal	Nominated	
FAMAS Awards	2016	Best Supporting Actor	Tragic Theater	Nominated	
FAMAS Awards	2024	Circle of Excellence	When I Met You in Tokyo	Won	
Film Ambassador's Night	2017	Special Award for International Recognition (Note: (shared with Gabby Concepcion, Dina Bonnevie, Joem Bascon, Matteo Guidicelli & Sandy Andolong))	Across the Crescent Moon	Won	
Gawad Pasado Awards	2009	Best Actor	Magkaibigan	Nominated	
Gawad Urian Awards	1977	Best Actor	Ganito Kami Noon... Paano Kayo Ngayon?	Nominated	
Gawad Urian Awards	1979	Best Actor	Ikaw ay Akin	Won	
Gawad Urian Awards	1983	Best Actor	Cain at Abel	Nominated	
Gawad Urian Awards	1984	Best Actor	Broken Marriage	Nominated	
Gawad Urian Awards	1989	Best Actor	Kung Napagod ang Puso	Nominated	
Gawad Urian Awards	1990	Best Actor	Imortal	Nominated	
Gawad Urian Awards	1991	Best Supporting Actor	Gumapang Ka sa Lusak	Nominated	
Gawad Urian Awards	1991	Best Actor	My Other Woman	Won	
Gawad Urian Awards	1992	Best Actor	Ipagpatawad Mo	Nominated	
Gawad Urian Awards	1994	Best Actor	Gaano Kita Kamahal	Nominated	
Gawad Urian Awards	1995	Best Actor	Bakit Ngayon ka Lang?	Nominated	
Gawad Urian Awards	1997	Best Actor	Madrasta	Nominated	
Gawad Urian Awards	2000	Best Actor	Bulaklak ng Maynila	Nominated	
Gawad Urian Awards	2003	Best Actor	Dekada '70	Nominated	
Golden Screen Awards	2004	Best Actor (Drama)	Mano Po II	Nominated	
Golden Screen Awards	2004	Best Actor (Musical or Comedy)	Pangarap Ko ang Ibigin Ka	Nominated	
Golden Screen Awards	2008	Gawad Lino Brocka Lifetime Achievement Award	Himself	Won	
Golden Screen Awards	2009	Best Performance by an Actor in a Lead Role (Drama)	Magkaibigan	Nominated	
Golden Screen TV Awards	2005	Outstanding Lead Actor in a Drama Series	Hanggang Kailan	Nominated	
Golden Screen TV Awards	2005	Outstanding Lead Actor in a Drama Special	Magpakailanman ("Sa Muling Pagsilip ng Liwanag")	Nominated	
History Maker Award	2018	Honoree	Himself	Won	
International Film Festival Manhattan	2017	Lifetime Achievement Award in Acting	Across the Crescent Moon	Won	
International Film Festival Manhattan	2017	Best Ensemble Acting Award (Note: (shared with Gabby Concepcion, Dina Bonnevie, Joem Bascon, Matteo Guidicelli & Sandy Andolong))	Across the Crescent Moon	Won	
Luna Awards	1989	Best Actor	Kapag Napagod ang Puso	Nominated	
Luna Awards	1991	Best Actor	Biktima	Won	
Luna Awards	1992	Best Actor	Ipagpatawad Mo	Won	
Luna Awards	1994	Best Actor	Gaano Kita Kamahal	Nominated	
Luna Awards	1995	Best Actor	Bakit Ngayon Ka Lang	Nominated	
Luna Awards	1996	Best Actor	Sa Ngalan ng Pag-ibig	Nominated	
Luna Awards	1997	Best Actor	Madrasta	Nominated	
Luna Awards	2000	Best Actor	Bulaklak ng Maynila	Won	
Luna Awards	2003	Best Actor	Dekada '70	Nominated	
Luna Awards	2005	Best Actor	Mano Po III: My Love	Nominated	
Luna Awards	2011 (Note: The 27th Luna Awards was delayed due to lack of government funding and was held together with the 29th Luna Awards.)	Best Actor	Magkaibigan	Won	
Luna Awards	2011	Best Supporting Actor	When Love Begins...	Nominated	
Luna Awards	2011	Best Actor	Sa'yo Lamang	Nominated	
Metro Manila Film Festival	1976	Best Actor	Ganito Kami Noon, Paano Kayo Ngayon?	Won	
Metro Manila Film Festival	1982	Best Actor	Haplos	Won	
Metro Manila Film Festival	1988	Best Actor	Magkano Ang Iyong Dangal?	Nominated	
Metro Manila Film Festival	1989	Best Actor	Imortal	Won	
Metro Manila Film Festival	1997	Best Actor	Nasaan ang Puso	Won	
Metro Manila Film Festival	1999	Best Actor	Bulaklak ng Maynila	Won	
Metro Manila Film Festival	2003	Best Actor	Pangarap Ko ang Ibigin Ka	Nominated	
Metro Manila Film Festival	2004	Best Actor	Mano Po III: My Love	Won	
Metro Manila Film Festival	2008	Best Actor	Magkaibigan	Won	
Metro Manila Film Festival	2012	Best Supporting Actor	El Presidente	Nominated	
Metro Manila Film Festival	2019	Hall of Famer (Note: Inducted into the MMFF Hall of Fame in the "Best Actor" category)	Himself	Won	
Metro Manila Film Festival	2023	Best Actor	When I Met You in Tokyo	Nominated	
Metro Manila Film Festival	2023	Best Director	When I Met You in Tokyo	Nominated	
Movie Magazine Awards	1989	Best Actor	Kapag Napagod ang Puso	Won	
People Asia Magazine Awards	2017	People of the Year	Himself	Won	
PMPC Star Awards for Movies	1991	Best Actor	Biktima	Won	
PMPC Star Awards for Movies	1991	Best Supporting Actor	Gumapang Ka sa Lusak	Won	
PMPC Star Awards for Movies	1992	Best Actor	Ipagpatawad Mo	Won	
PMPC Star Awards for Movies	1994	Best Actor (Note: (tied with Phillip Salvador))	Gaano kita Kamahal	Won	
PMPC Star Awards for Movies	1995	Star Decade Award (Note: (with Nora Aunor & Jaclyn Jose))	Himself	Won	
PMPC Star Awards for Movies	1997	Best Actor	Madrasta	Won	
PMPC Star Awards for Movies	1998	Best Actor	Hanggang Ngayon Ikay Mahal	Nominated	
PMPC Star Awards for Movies	2000	Best Actor	Sugatang Puso	Nominated	
PMPC Star Awards for Movies	2006	Best Supporting Actor	Blue Moon	Nominated	
PMPC Star Awards for Movies	2011	Best Actor	Sa'yo Lamang	Nominated	
PMPC Star Awards for Movies	2011	Ulirang Artista Lifetime Achievement Award	Himself	Won	
PMPC Star Awards for Movies	2017	Best Supporting Actor	The Escort	Nominated	
PMPC Star Awards for Movies	2019	Outstanding Star of the Century	Himself	Won	
PMPC Star Awards for Movies	2023	Best Supporting Actor	On the Job 2: The Missing 8	Nominated	
PMPC Star Awards for Movies	2024	Dekada Award	Christopher de Leon	Won	
PMPC Star Awards for Television	2001	Best Game Show Host	Who Wants to be a Millionaire	Nominated	
PMPC Star Awards for Television	2003	Best Drama Actor	Ang Iibigin Ay Ikaw	Nominated	
PMPC Star Awards for Television	2004	Best Drama Actor	Hanggang Kailan	Nominated	
PMPC Star Awards for Television	2005	Best Drama Actor	Hanggang Kailan	Nominated	
PMPC Star Awards for Television	2009	Best Drama Actor	Kahit Isang Saglit	Nominated	
PMPC Star Awards for Television	2014	Best Drama Supporting Actor	Ikaw Lamang	Nominated	
PMPC Star Awards for Television	2016	Best Drama Supporting Actor	Beautiful Strangers	Nominated	
PMPC Star Awards for Television	2018	Best Drama Supporting Actor	Sana Dalawa ang Puso	Nominated	
PMPC Star Awards for Television	2025	Best Drama Supporting Actor	Batang Quiapo	Nominated	
The EDDYS	2022	Best Supporting Actor	On the Job 2: The Missing 8	Nominated	
Visionary Awards	2008	Legend Award for Acting	Himself	Won	
Young Critics Circle	1996	Best Performance by Male or Female, Adult or Child, Individual or Ensemble in Leading or Supporting Role	Madrasta	Won	
Young Critics Circle	2000	Best Performance by Male or Female, Adult or Child, Individual or Ensemble in Leading or Supporting Role	Bulaklak ng Maynila	Nominated	
