= Biktima =

Biktima may refer to:

== Film ==
- Biktima (1990 film), a Philippine thriller film
- Biktima (2012 film), a Philippine thriller film
