= Kung Mangarap Ka't Magising =

1977 romantic drama film by Mike de Leon

- Directed by: Mike de Leon
- Written by: Rey Santayana; Mike De Leon
- Produced by: Manuel De Leon
- Starring: Christopher de Leon; Hilda Koronel
- Cinematography: Francis Escaler; Mike De Leon
- Edited by: Ike Jarlego Jr.
- Music by: Jun Latonio
- Production company: LVN Pictures
- Release date: December 24, 1977
- Running time: 112 minutes
- Country: Philippines
- Language: Filipino

Kung Mangarap Ka't Magising (Filipino for "when you dream and wake up"), released overseas as Moments in a Stolen Dream, is a 1977 Philippine coming-of-age romantic drama film directed by Mike de Leon from a screenplay he co-written with Rey Santayana. Set in Baguio, the film stars Christopher de Leon and Hilda Koronel as two young people whose friendship blooms into a complicated romance.

The film was made in tribute to de Leon's grandmother, Narcisa de Leon, the matriarch of LVN Pictures, for her centennial. Kung Mangarap Ka't Magising premiered was an official entry to the 3rd Metro Manila Film Festival.

== Plot ==
Joey is an easygoing college student at the University of the Philippines Baguio. He enjoys composing music and jamming with his friends. Underneath the surface, however, he is quietly struggling with the death of his girlfriend and is at odds with the professional path his father wants for him.

One day, he meets Anna, who is there visiting her cousin Cecile. Joey is attracted to Anna but discovers that she is married with a son. Nevertheless, a friendship strikes between the two. Anna reveals that she is unhappy in her marriage as a young, trophy wife to her domineering husband, having travelled to Baguio to spend some time away from him.

Eventually, Joey and Anna become closer and discover a sense of freedom when they are together. However, their brief affair does not last as Anna acknowledges that reality will soon catch up with them. In the end, the couple part ways, with Anna going back to her husband in Manila. Joey, meanwhile, narrates that sometimes it is enough for someone to come into our lives, even for a brief moment, to change it.

== Cast ==
- Christopher de Leon as Joey
- Hilda Koronel as Ana
- Laurice Guillen as Cecile
- Moody Diaz as Mrs. Laguitan
- Danny Javier as Jojo
- Boboy Garrovillo as Mike
- Bibeth Orteza as Nanette
- Briccio Santos as Freddie

== Production ==
=== Development ===
In 1977, LVN Pictures celebrated the centennial of its founder, Narcisa de Leon, who was also the grandmother of director Mike de Leon. Although the company had not produced films for several years, de Leon's father, producer Manuel de Leon, approved producing one film in celebration. Director de Leon and his co-screenwriter Rey Santayana conceived of the film Kung Mangarap Ka't Magising as a tribute to the romantic musicals of LVN Pictures.

The story was inspired by the 1966 French film A Man and a Woman directed by Claude Lelouch. The initial storyline, however, was criticized as "too much like a European film" by producer Manuel de Leon. The director subsequently added a traumatic past to the main character. Nevertheless, there is still a touch of what film academic Patrick Campos describes as "the sensibility of the European art film." Neither director-screenwriter de Leon nor his co-screenwriter Santayana had previous screenwriting experience, and so some scenes were made up as filming went on.

=== Filming and post-production ===
The film was shot in Baguio and Sagada. As shooting went on, de Leon and Santayana discussed whether scenes should be shot in Manila as well, but the co-writers ultimately decided to keep the entire film in the Cordillera. An exception, however, was a flashback scene of a cocktail party set in Manila, which was filmed at the home of Narcisa de Leon. The home had been used as a shooting location for older LVN films, including its first film Giliw Ko, and would be used again in director de Leon's follow-up film, Kakabakaba Ka Ba?.

In the initial script, the character of Ana's son had a larger role, but de Leon found the child actor playing the son difficult to work with and subsequently wrote most of his scenes out of the film.

Christopher de Leon learned how to play the piano for the role of Joey. Hilda Koronel recalled that the young actors on set, including actor de Leon and herself, would go out at night, but still make the early call times, even if just with an hour of sleep. At the time of shooting, Koronel was a student at Maryknoll College and had to excuse herself for a semester to finish the film. She previously worked with director de Leon on Lino Brocka's Manila in the Claws of Light, calling de Leon "a great cinematographer and director."

The film was dubbed in post-production.

=== Music ===
The film was scored by Jun Latonio, in his first film work, with the assistance of lyricist Joseph Olfindo. They were both students at the University of the Philippines College of Music whom de Leon met through his cousin, Nonong Buencamino. Olfindo would later suggest the music-related "wild concept" that would develop into de Leon's next film, Kakabakaba Ka Ba?. Latonio would go on to score other films including Joey Gosiengfiao's Temptation Island and Laurice Guillen's directorial debut Kasal?.

== Release ==
The film premiered on December 24, 1977, as an official entry to the 3rd Metro Manila Film Festival.

Kung Mangarap Ka't Magising was also an entry to the 1978 Asian Film Festival, held in Sydney, Australia, alongside de Leon's 1976 directorial debut Itim. The latter went on to win Best Picture at the festival.

=== Restoration ===
The film was digitally restored as part of the ABS-CBN Film Restoration Project. The actual restoration itself was done in the Philippines by Central Digital Lab, with the music restoration supervised by de Leon. The restoration was theatrically released at the Film Restoration Project's REELive the Classics program in February 2016 at Power Plant Mall. The following year, the restoration was shown at the 19th Far East Film Festival in Udine, Italy, as part of the Classics Restoration section, alongside Lino Brocka's Cain and Abel and Mario O'Hara's Tatlong Taong Walang Diyos.

The restored version was included in the "Mike De Leon, Self-Portrait of a Filipino Filmmaker" retrospective at the Museum of Modern Art in New York City in November 2022. Also included in the retrospective was the documentary by Clodualdo del Mundo Jr., "Si Boyet, Hilda, Atbp," on the filming of Kung Mangarap Ka't Magising. That same year, the film was included in another retrospective, "Mike de Leon: A Life in (Moving) Pictures," this time at the Three Continents Festival in Nantes, France.

=== Home media ===
In March 2023, Kung Mangarap Ka't Magising was released on Blu-ray Disc by Carlotta Films as part of a box set of select films directed by de Leon.

== Reception ==
=== Critical response ===
In the Metro Manila Film Festival issue for Metro Manila magazine, critic and jury chairman Rolando Tinio barraged Kung Mangarap Ka't Magising, calling it "futile" for being "pure film." Recalling the incident in his memoir, director de Leon wrote, "It is evident in the review that Tinio was only interested in showing people how intellectually superior he was" by name dropping directors and talking of the "ur (whatever that was)," adding "it was a self-aggrandizing attack on a simple romcom."

The film has received generally positive retrospective reviews, with high praise for the cinematography and setting. Cathy Babao of the Philippine Daily Inquirer also noted the chemistry between de Leon and Koronel. Noel Vera of BusinessWorld, however, gave the film an average review, complimenting the style and cinematography, while questioning parts of the script, ultimately summarizing, "Not perhaps a great film (his [director Mike de Leon] masterpiece lay ahead of him) but a lovely early work nevertheless."

=== Accolades ===
Composer Jun Latonio won the Gawad Urian and Tinig Award for the musical score of Kung Mangarap Ka't Magising.
