= Christopher de Leon =

Filipino actor and filmmaker (born 1956)

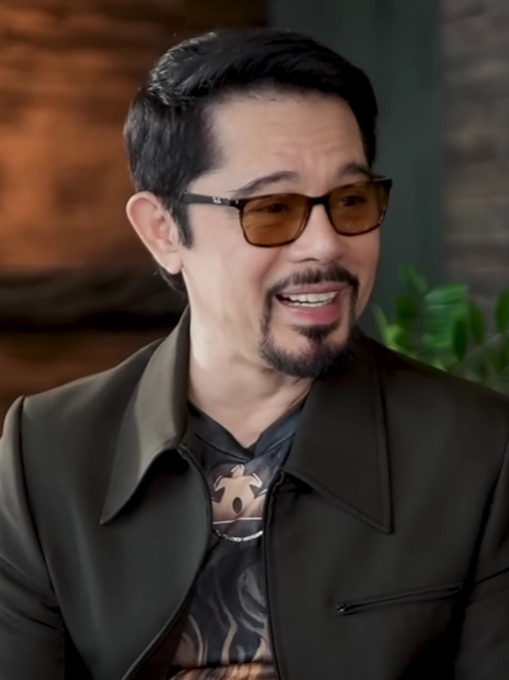
- De Leon in 2023

Member of the Batangas Provincial Board from the 2nd district
- In office June 30, 2010 – June 30, 2013

Personal details
- Born: Christopher Strauss de Leon; October 31, 1956 (age 69) Manila, Philippines
- Citizenship: Philippines; United States (since 1999)
- Party: Liberal (2009–2013)
- Other political affiliations: PMP (until 2009)
- Spouses: Nora Aunor (m. 1975; ann. 1996) Sandy Andolong (m. 2001)
- Relations: Janine Gutierrez (adoptive granddaughter)
- Children: 10 (incl. Lotlot and Matet)
- Parent(s): Gil de León (father); Lilia Dizon (mother)
- Occupation: Actor; politician
- Other name: Boyet
- Education: University of the East (BFA)
- Years active: 1974–present
- Works: Full list
- Awards: Full list

Christopher Strauss de Leon (born October 31, 1956), also known as Boyet, is a Filipino actor and politician. Often referred to by Philippine media as the "King of Philippine Drama", he gained stardom for his leading man roles in numerous film and television productions including period, romantic drama and thriller. His work, covering more than five decades, has received various accolades, including eight FAMAS Awards, two Gawad Urian Awards, four Luna Awards, nine Star Awards, and eight Metro Manila Film Festival Awards.

De Leon began acting as a teenager, winning the FAMAS Award for Best Actor for his screen debut in Lino Brocka's Tinimbang Ka Ngunit Kulang (1974). He gained wider recognition for his portrayal of a naive peasant in Eddie Romero's Ganito Kami Noon... Paano Kayo Ngayon? (1976), earning him his second FAMAS for Best Actor. He won his first Gawad Urian Award for Best Actor for his portrayal in Ishmael Bernal's Ikaw ay Akin (1978). De Leon continued to gain recognition and critical acclaim for his film work in the 1980s, 1990s, and 2000s, with leading roles in Haplos (1982), Imortal (1989), Biktima, My Other Woman (both in 1990), Ipagpatawad Mo (1991), Gaano Kita Kamahal (1993), Madrasta (1996), Nasaan ang Puso (1997), Bulaklak ng Maynila (1999), Dekada '70 (2002), Mano Po III: My Love (2004) and Magkaibigan (2008).

De Leon is cited by critics as one of the best Filipino actors of all time and was named one of the highest-paid Filipino actors in the 1980s. He is the recipient of many honorary accolades. He was awarded with the FAMAS Circle of Excellence Award in 2005, a star on the Eastwood City Walk of Fame in 2006, the Lino Brocka Lifetime Achievement Award by the Golden Screen Awards in 2008 and the Lifetime Achievement Award in Acting at the International Film Festival Manhattan in 2017. He achieved Grand Slam in 1991, the second actor to win Best Actor in all major award-giving bodies in the country. He is also one of the elite group of actors to be inducted into the Hall of Fame at the FAMAS Awards (1993) and the Metro Manila Film Festival (2019), in the Best Actor category.

== Early life and education ==
De Leon is the son of actors Gil de Leon and Lilia Dizon (née Claire Strauss). He is of German Jewish descent from his maternal grandfather. On May 11, 1999, he was given United States citizenship, passed to him through his mother from her father. He studied fine arts at the University of the East in Manila.

== Acting career ==
=== 1974–1979: Breakthrough and stardom ===
At age 17, De Leon made his acting debut in Lino Brocka's 1974 film Tinimbang Ka Ngunit Kulang. The production was a success at the box office and earned De Leon his first acting award, as Best Actor at the 22nd FAMAS Awards. This helped open doors to more acting projects. The following year, he played the role of an Igorot in Gerardo de Leon's romance drama Banaue: Stairway to the Sky. In 1976, De Leon starred in two productions. He portrayed a naive Indio in Eddie Romero's period drama Ganito Kami Noon... Paano Kayo Ngayon?. His performance was well received by critics, and he again won Best Actor, at the 24th FAMAS Awards and second Metro Manila Film Festival. He subsequently played a Japanese-Filipino military officer in Mario O'Hara's period drama Tatlong Taong Walang Diyos.

The following year, De Leon appeared in two productions. He starred in Elwood Perez' Masarap, Masakit ang Umibig, which earned him a Best Actor nomination at the 25th FAMAS Awards. He then appeared in Mike De Leon's coming-of-age piece Kung Mangarap Ka't Magising, which premiered at the third Metro Manila Film Festival. In 1978, he starred in two Ishmael Bernal films, one of which was the drama Lagi Na Lamang Ba Akong Babae?. This earned him his fifth Best Actor nomination, at the 27th FAMAS Awards. He next starred in the drama Ikaw Ay Akin. His performance received critical acclaim, winning him a Best Actor trophy at the Gawad Urian Awards. In 1979, he starred in one of the first Filipino films on peasant oppression, Ang Alamat ni Julian Makabayan.

=== 1980s: Critical acclaim ===
After playing a series of dramatic roles, De Leon starred in Mike de Leon's musical comedy Kakabakaba Ka Ba?. Released in 1980, the film was praised for its satirical plot and good mix of music. The same year, he appeared in two more production: the drama Taga sa Panahon, which premiered at the sixth Metro Manila Film Festival, and Aguila. His portrayal earned him a Best Actor nomination at the 29th FAMAS Awards. In 1981, he starred in Elwood Pérez's Pakawalan Mo Ako. His performance earned him his ninth Best Actor nomination, at the 30th FAMAS Awards. De Leon had three releases in 1982: Ishmael Bernal's Relasyon, for which he won Best Actor at the Catholic Mass Media Awards as well as another nomination at the FAMAS Awards; the mystery drama Haplos, for which he received his second Best Actor win at the Metro Manila Film Festival; and finally, Lino Brocka's thriller drama Cain at Abel. The film was the first Filipino entry at the San Sebastián International Film Festival, and De Leon received his third Best Actor nomination at the Gawad Urian Awards.

In 1983, De Leon appeared in Ishmael Bernal's drama film Broken Marriage, which earned him Best Actor nominations from both FAMAS and Gawad Urian. He appeared in three productions in 1985: the drama musical Bituing Walang Ningning, Mike de Leon's romantic drama Hindi Nahahati ang Langit, and Carlo J. Caparas' God... Save Me! For this performance, De Leon received a Best Actor nomination at the FAMAS. He began television work in 1986, with the sketch comedy Goin' Bananas. In 1987, he appeared in Lino Brocka's Maging Akin Ka Lamang, which earned him his fourteenth Best Actor nomination at the FAMAS Awards. The following year, he starred in the romantic drama Kapag Napagod ang Puso. Writing for Manila Standard, critic and director Lav Díaz praised De Leon's complex performance, stating that the film was "another big step for Christopher de Leon [...] toward greatness in the art of acting". De Leon received his first Best Actor nomination at the Luna Awards, and won Best Actor at the FAMAS and Movie Magazine Awards.

Later in 1988, De Leon starred in Laurice Guillen's Magkano ang Iyong Dangal?. His portrayal was once again praised by critics, with Lav Díaz stating that his acting "almost reaches the point that whenever people watch a film [De Leon] is featured in, he is now the one being watched instead of the film". For the final year of the decade, De Leon starred in two productions, including the third instalment of the anthology film, 3 Mukha ng Pag-ibig and Eddie García's Imortal. He won his third Best Actor award at the Metro Manila Film Festival and received nominations from FAMAS and Gawad Urian in the same category.

=== 1990s: Established leading man ===
De Leon starred in two Lino Brocka films in 1990, including Biktima, for which he won Best Actor at the Luna Awards and Star Awards for Movies. He had a supporting role in the political thriller Gumapang Ka sa Lusak, which scored him a Supporting Actor of the Year win at the Star Awards and a nomination at the Gawad Urian in the same category. He also appeared in the romantic drama My Other Woman, for which he won Best Actor at the FAMAS, Gawad Urian, and Catholic Mass Media Awards. This distinction made him the second Filipino actor to win Best Actor from all major award-giving bodies in the country for two films. The following year, he worked again with Laurice Guillen in her drama Ipagpatawad Mo. His critically acclaimed portrayal won him Best Actor again at FAMAS, Luna, and Star Awards. In 1992, De Leon starred in Joel Lamangan's Hiram na Mukha, followed by the biopic Gaano Kita Kamahal a year later. He tied with Phillip Salvador as Movie Actor of the Year at the Star Awards and received Best Actor nominations at the Gawad Urian and Luna Awards. In 1993, De Leon started making appearances in the weekly anthology Star Drama Presents.

In 1995, De Leon starred in Chito S. Roño's action thriller Eskapo. The following year, he appeared in Rory Quintos' Sa Aking mga Kamay. After making a cameo in the biblical drama Kristo, De León starred in the family drama Madrasta. His performance received praise, winning him top honors at the Young Critics Circle and Star Awards. At the 27th Box Office Entertainment Awards, he was hailed as the "Box Office King". The same year, he starred in the drama Nasaan ang Puso, for which he won Best Actor at the 23rd Metro Manila Film Festival. In 1998, he played a priest in the action drama Ama Namin. The following year, he starred in the fantasy film Wansapanataym: The Movie. De Leon closed the decade with an acclaimed performance in Joel Lamangan's Bulaklak ng Maynila. His portrayal earned him Best Actor wins at Luna and the Metro Manila Film Festival, as well as nominations from Gawad Urian and the Young Critics Circle.

=== 2000–2019: Further critical and commercial success ===
Between 2000 and 2010, De Leon only appeared in ten films and ventured further into television. In 2000, he hosted the Filipino edition of the game show Who Wants to Be a Millionaire? Veronique del Rosario-Corpus, Viva Television president, revealed that he underwent training and workshops to prepare for his first hosting stint. He later received a nomination for Best Game Show Host at the PMPC Star Awards for Television. The following year, De León starred with an ensemble cast in Laurice Guillen's American Adobo, which premiered at the San Diego Asian Film Festival. In 2002, he starred in the romantic drama series Ang Iibigin ay Ikaw as well as its sequel, Ang Iibigin ay Ikaw Pa Rin (2003). The same year, he appeared with Vilma Santos in the film adaptation of Lualhati Bautista's novel Dekada '70, under the direction of Chito Roño. The film premiered at the 28th Metro Manila Film Festival, with his performance earning him Best Actor nominations from Gawad Urian and Luna.

In 2003, de Leon starred in the romance film Pangarap Ko ang Ibigin Ka, in which he was paired once again with singer Regine Velasquez; the film was originally planned to be directed by Yam Laranas, but Louie Ignacio was ultimately named as its director. In the same year, De Leon starred in the drama film Mano Po 2: My Home, and he appeared in the 2004 sequel, Mano Po III: My Love, as a different character. In 2004, De Leon was among the council in the second season of StarStruck. He also appeared in the drama series Hanggang Kailan. In 2005, he had a role in the third installment of Now and Forever, Agos. The same year, he was an antagonist in the superhero television series Darna.

In 2006, De Leon played the role of a banking magnate in the romantic family drama Maging Sino Ka Man and later reprised his role in the sequel, Maging Sino Ka Man: Ang Pagbabalik, which aired in 2007. He next starred with an ensemble cast in Joel Lamangan's Blue Moon. De Leon then appeared in the pilot episode of the drama series Pangarap na Bituin, followed by a supporting role in Kahit Isang Saglit (2008). De Leon also starred opposite Angel Aquino in Eddie Romero's final directorial effort, Faces of Love (2007). In 2009, he had supporting roles in the drama series Lovers in Paris and Sana Ngayong Pasko. Later that year, De Leon appeared in the film Mano Po 6: A Mother's Love, which premiered at the 35th Metro Manila Film Festival.

==== 2010s: Sa 'yo Lamang, El Presidente, and Lorenzo ====
In 2010, De Leon starred with an ensemble cast in Laurice Guillen's Sa 'yo Lamang. The film earned him a Best Actor nomination at the 29th Luna Awards. Also in 2010, he played the character of a black sorcerer in the fantasy film Ilumina. He next appeared in the anthologies SRO Cinemaserye and Maalaala Mo Kaya, as well as making guest appearances in the dramas Jillian: Namamasko Po and Panday Kids. In 2011, De Leon starred in the political drama Sa Ngalan ng Ina and made guest appearances in the dramas 100 Days to Heaven and Bantatay. He also played a supporting role in the fantasy action series Captain Barbell. The same year, he played a special role in the romantic comedy Catch Me, I'm in Love. In 2012, De Leon portrayed General Antonio Luna in the biographical film El Presidente. His performance received a Best Supporting Actor nomination at the 38th Metro Manila Film Festival. Also in 2012, he played supporting roles in the dramas Dahil sa Pag-ibig, Pahiram ng Sandali, Kung Ako'y Iiwan Mo, and Luna Blanca. In 2013, he produced the play Lorenzo, a musical on the life of Lorenzo Ruiz, with music by Ryan Cayabyab and book and lyrics by Juan Ekis and Paul Dumol. The play's maiden run was held in September 2013 at DLS-CSB's SDA Theater.

De Leon had more supporting roles in soap operas in the succeeding years. He was cast in main roles in several television series, such as Muling Buksan ang Puso (2013), The Legal Wife (2014), Ikaw Lamang (2014), and Beautiful Strangers (2015), earning Best Drama Supporting Actor nominations at the Star Awards for TV for the latter three. In that span, De Leon was in two films, including the action feature Sa Ngalan ng Ama, Ina at mga Anak (2014) and the supernatural horror Tragic Theater (2015). In 2016, he made guest appearances in Ang Probinsyano and Alyas Robin Hood as well as landing supporting roles in Little Nanay and Ang Panday. That same year, he played an ex-military officer-turned-kidnapper in the suspense thriller Dukot. Supporting roles came in the following years, with Kambal, Karibal (2017) and Sana Dalawa ang Puso (2018). In that span, he also made film appearances in Carlo J. Caparas' Kamandag ng Droga (2017), Raya Martin's Smaller and Smaller Circles (2017), and Ruel Bayani's Kasal (2018).

=== 2020s: Continued presence in film and television ===
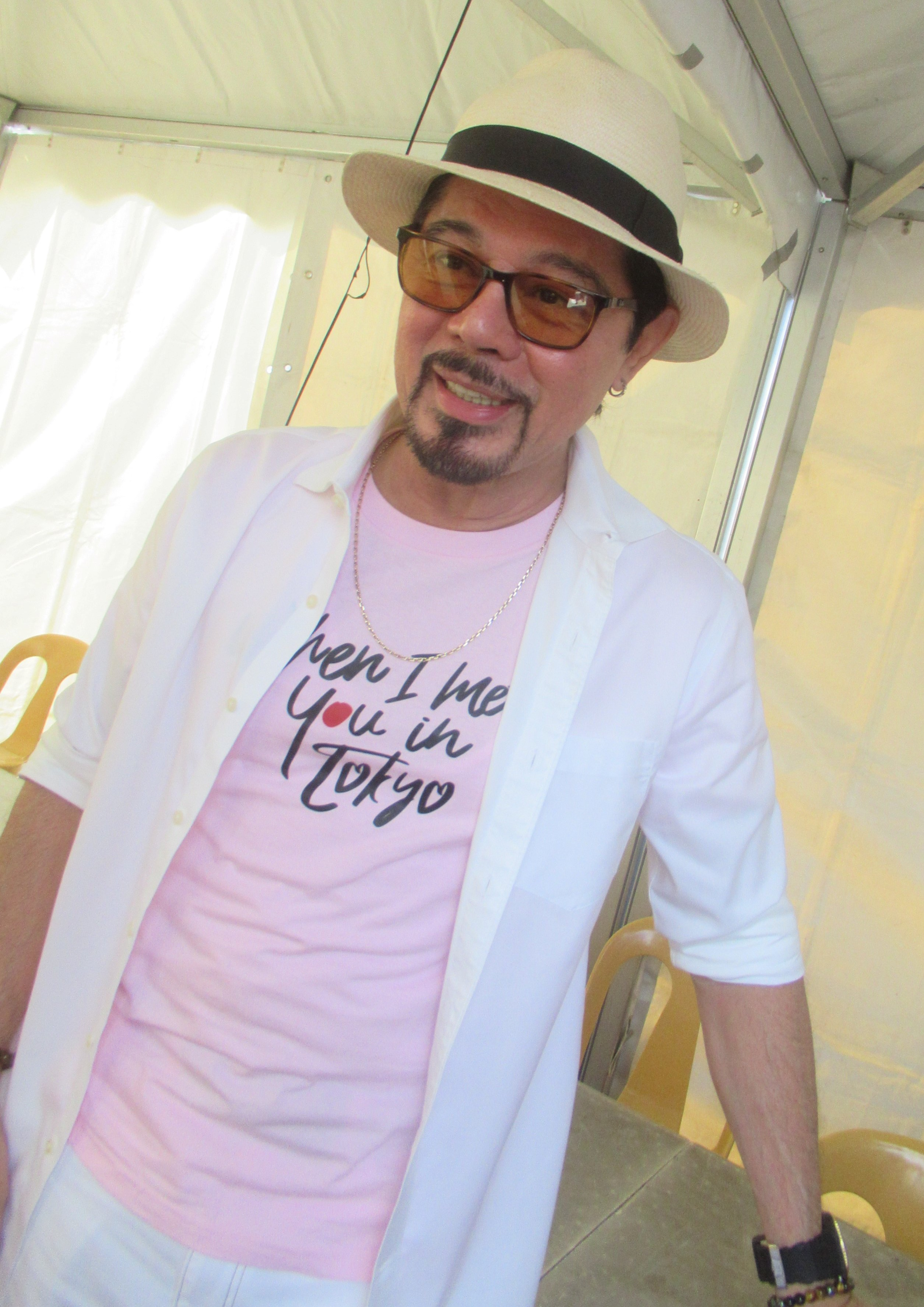
De Leon at the Metro Manila Film Festival Parade of Stars in 2023

In 2020, De Leon played a supporting role in the drama series Love Thy Woman. He next appeared in an episode of the anthology series I Can See You, the following year. He also made a special appearance in the drama series Huwag Kang Mangamba. In 2021, De Leon had a supporting role in Erik Matti's crime thriller On the Job: The Missing 8. In 2022, he played a supporting role in the action drama series Lolong. Before its premiere, De Leon revealed in an interview that he performed all of his stunts. In 2023, De Leon reprised his role in the psychological thriller Cattleya Killer, the sequel to the 1996 film Sa Aking mga Kamay.

Also in 2023, De Leon was cast as the main antagonist in the action drama series Batang Quiapo, based on the 1986 action-comedy film of the same name. The same year, he reunited with Vilma Santos for their 25th film together, When I Met You in Tokyo, which premiered at the Metro Manila Film Festival.

== Other ventures ==
=== Political career ===
In 2007, De Leon decided to run as vice governor of the province of Batangas. He was supposed to be the running mate of incumbent vice governor Ricky Recto but instead ran with former Batangas police director Nestor Sanares; he lost to Mark Leviste. He ran once more in 2010, this time for board member of the Second District of Batangas, which he won. Garnering the highest number of votes among those elected, he became Senior Board Member of Batangas. In 2013, he was a candidate for Batangas's 2nd congressional district but lost to incumbent representative Hermilando Mandanas's chief of staff, Raneo Abu.

2013 Philippine House of Representatives election at Batangas' 2nd district
Party	Candidate	Votes	%
Nacionalista	Raneo Abu	94,531	39.86
UNA	Danilo Berberabe	93,426	39.39
Liberal	Christopher De Leon	34,218	14.43
Margin of victory		1,105	0.47%
Invalid or blank votes		15,003	6.33
Total votes		237,178	100.00
Nacionalista gain from Liberal			

== Reception ==
De Leon has been named the most successful Filipino drama actor for three decades (1970s, 1980s, 1990s). The Daily Tribune named him the third greatest leading man in Philippine cinema, behind Rogelio de la Rosa and Leopoldo Salcedo. He was one of the highest-paid film actors in the Philippines during the 1980s, with a salary reaching over ₱300,000 per film. In a 2001 interview with journalist Remy Umerez, César Montano described De Leon as the most professional actor he had ever worked with, saying: "He comes to the set fully prepared and you better watch out if you don't know your lines well. He can memorize a revised script in the wink of an eye." Montano also praised De Leon's acting style, saying: "He has a very sharp memory and his approach to acting is infectious...Difficult scenes become easy to stage with seasoned actors like Boyet."

De Leon has starred in numerous critically acclaimed films that hold significance within Philippine cinema. In 2006, six renowned film critics through the Philippine Daily Inquirer listed Gumapang Ka sa Lusak (1990) and Dekada '70 (2002) among the 21 best Filipino films in the last 21 years. In 2007, the Philippine Entertainment Portal named three films, Aguila (1979), Dekada '70 (2002), and Ganito Kami Noon... Paano Kayo Ngayon? (1976) on their list of top ten Philippine historical films of all time. In 2021, Far Out Magazine named Tatlong Taong Walang Diyos (1976) one of the ten essential films from the Philippines. In 2023, critics from the Philippine Entertainment Portal named De Leon among the best actors of the year for his role in When I Met You in Tokyo.

== Personal life ==
De Leon's first marriage was to actress Nora Aunor. The couple has one biological child and four adopted children, including actresses Matet and Lotlot de Leon. They divorced in 1996.De Leon's second marriage, to actress Sandy Andolong, produced five children.

De Leon is a practicing Roman Catholic.

On March 17, 2020, during the COVID-19 pandemic, De Leon announced that he had been diagnosed with the virus. He claimed to be asymptomatic, and was not in contact with any COVID-19 carriers. He recovered and was released from hospital on March 24.

== Acting credits and accolades ==
Among numerous accolades for his acting work, De Leon has won a total of eight FAMAS Awards, two Gawad Urians, four Lunas, nine Star Awards, and eight Metro Manila Awards. In 1991, he became the second Filipino actor to achieve the "Grand Slam", for his performances in Biktima (1990) and My Other Woman (1990), winning in the Best Actor category from all major Philippine award-giving bodies. De Leon has been inducted into the hall of fame of two of these: FAMAS (1993) and the Metro Manila Film Festival (2019), in the Best Actor category. For his contributions to Philippine cinema, De Leon is also a recipient of several honorary accolades. In 2008, he was presented with the Lino Brocka Lifetime Achievement Award at the Golden Screen Awards. In 2011, he was awarded the Ulirang Artista Lifetime Achievement Award by the PMPC Star Awards for Movies. In 2017, he was honored with the Lifetime Achievement Award in Acting at the International Film Festival Manhattan. The same year, he was named one of the "People of the Year" by People Asia magazine.

With more than 200 acting credits to his name, some of De Leon's most critically and commercially successful films, according to the review aggregator site Rotten Tomatoes include Tinimbang Ka Ngunit Kulang (1974), Ganito Kami Noon... Paano Kayo Ngayon? (1976), Tatlong Taong Walang Diyos (1976), Ikaw Ay Akin (1978), Kakabakaba Ka Ba? (1980), Relasyon (1982), Kapag Napagod ang Puso (1988), My Other Woman (1990), Biktima (1990), Madrasta (1996), Bulaklak ng Maynila (1999), Dekada '70 (2002), Pangarap Ko ang Ibigin Ka (2003), Magkaibigan (2008), and When Love Begins (2008). His television work includes the series Ang Iibigin ay Ikaw (2002), Hanggang Kailan (2004), Maging Sino Ka Man (2006), Kahit Isang Saglit (2008), The Legal Wife (2014), Ikaw Lamang (2014), Beautiful Strangers (2015), Lolong (2022), and Batang Quiapo (2023–2026).

== Discography ==
- Mga Awit Pelikula ni Christopher de Leon (2006)

== See also ==
- List of Philippine actors
- Television in the Philippines
- List of people who won the Philippine movie grand slam
