= Orlando Nadres =

Filipino film director

- Born: Orlando Reobaldo Nadres; November 1938; Tayabas City, Tayabas, Philippines
- Died: July 14, 1991 (aged 52–53)
- Occupations: Film director, actor, television writer, stage director
- Years active: 1970–1991
- Parent(s): Igmideo Nadres; Tecla Reobaldo

Orlando Nadres (November 1938, in Tayabas, Quezon – July 14, 1991) was a stage, film, television writer, director and actor.

He is the son of Igmideo Nadres and Tecla Reobaldo. He attended the Lucena and Tayabas Elementary School, then went to Luis Palad High School where he published his first story in Liwayway. He spent four years in Our Lady of Guadalupe Seminary and a year in the St. Paul Seminary in Pasay. He took a secretarial course and enrolled in Journalism and later in Foreign Service, major in French in U.S.T.

== As a writer ==
Nadres first wrote professionally for Komiks, together with Mars Ravalo doing layouts and writing stories for the publication and in 1968 became the managing editor of the same publication. In the 1960s, he worked for G. Miranda and Sons Publishing Co. which later inspired him to write Masikip, Maluwang... Paraisong Parisukat. Later he became the editor of Sixteen Magazine, a job which introduced him to the world of film. He became involved in theater because of his involvement with Lino Brocka, who introduced him to Philippine Educational Theater Association (PETA).

After martial law was declared, he helped sustain PETA, as an actor, playwright and trainer in CITASA.

In the 1970s, Nadres wrote Hanggang Dito na Lamang at Maraming Salamat, a stage play about homosexual love.

In the late 1980s, when he decided to stay in his hometown Tayabas, Nadres formed the theater group Sanayan at Ugnayan sa Sining (SUSI), which revived the traditional performances of Carillo, Santacruzan, and Sarswela.

== Works ==
=== Films ===
- Stardoom (1970)
- Happy Hippie Holiday (1971)
- Villa Miranda (1972)
- Till Death Do Us Part (1973)
- Ang Tatay Kong Nanay (1978)
- Immortal (1989)
- Bakit Kay Tagal ng Sandali (1992)
- Una Kang Naging Akin (1991)

=== Film appearances ===
- Tinimbang Ka Ngunit Kulang (1974)
- Tatlong taong walang Diyos (1976)
- Maynila sa Mga Kuko ng Liwanag (1977)
- Tahan Na Empoy Tahan Na (1977)

=== Films directed ===
- Nora, Mahal Kita (1972)
- Lupang Hinirang (1973)
- Pahiram ng Pag-ibig (1975)
- Malamig Miinit ang Magdamag (1976)
- Gisingin Mo ang Umaga (1976)

=== For television ===
- Balintataw (1970–72; 1988)
- Hilda (1972)
- Babae (1974)
- Atin ang Daigdig (1974)
- Tanghalan (1975)
- Lino Brocka Presents (1977)
- Flordeluna (1979)

=== Teleplay appearances ===
- Mang Nano (1975)
- Alindog (1977)

== Awards ==
Year	Award-Giving Body	Category	Recipient	Result
1989	Metro Manila Film Festival	Best Story	Imortal	Won
1989	Metro Manila Film Festival	Best Screenplay	Imortal	Won
