= 1984 FAMAS Awards =

32nd edition of Filipino movie awards

32nd FAMAS Awards
- Date: 1984
- Site: Philippines

Highlights
- Best Picture: Karnal ~ Cine Suerte Inc.
- Most awards: Karnal ~ Cine Suerte Inc. (6 wins)

The 32nd Filipino Academy of Movie Arts and Sciences Awards Night was held in 1984 in the Philippines. The event recognized outstanding achievements of the different films for the year 1983.

Karnal won the most awards including the FAMAS Award for Best Picture and best director for Marilou Diaz-Abaya who became the second woman director to win the award. The best actor award was also given to two great actors; Eddie Garcia and Fernando Poe Jr. for the first time in FAMAS history. Veteran actress Charito Solis won her fifth Best Actress trophy, elevating her to Hall of Fame status.

== Awards ==
=== Major Awards ===
Winners are listed first and highlighted with boldface.

Best Picture	Best Director
**Karnal — Cine Suerte Inc.**; Paano ba Mangarap — VIVA Films; Broken Marriage — Regal Films; Nagalit ang Buwan sa Haba ng Gabi — Essex Films; Pieta — Amazaldy Film Productions; Umpisahan mo... tatapusin ko — FPJ Productions	**Marilou Diaz-Abaya — Karnal**; Ishmael Bernal — Broken Marriage; Danny L. Zialcita — Nagalit ang Buwan sa Haba ng Gabi; Eddie Garcia — Paano ba ang Mangarap; Carlo J. Caparas — Pieta; Maryo J. de los Reyes — Saan Darating ang Umaga?; Fernando Poe Jr. — Umpisahan Mo... Tatapusin Ko
Best Actor	Best Actress
**Fernando Poe Jr. — Umpisahan mo...Tatapusin ko**; **Eddie Garcia — Minsan pa nating Hagkan ang Nakaraan**; Anthony Alonzo — Bago Kumalat ang Kamandag; Christopher De Leon — Broken Marriage; Phillip Salvador — 'Karnal; Ace Vergel — 'Pieta; Rudy Fernandez — 'Sumuko ka na Ronquillo	**Charito Solis — Don't Cry for me, Papa**; Nora Aunor — Minsan, May Isang Ina; Vilma Santos — Broken Marriage; Coney Reyes — Bago KUmalat ang Kamandag; Laurice Guillen — Nagalit ang Buwan sa Haba ng Gabi; Vivian Velez— Pieta; Nida Blanca— Saan Darating ang Umaga
Best Supporting Actor	Best Supporting Actress
**Vic Silayan — Karnal**; Robert Arevalo — Ang boyfriend kong Kano; Ramon Revilla Jr.— Dugong Buhay; Johnny Wilson — Isang bala ka Lang; Tommy Abuel — Palabra de Honor; Paquito Diaz — Pedro Tunasan; Dencio Padilla — Tatak Yakuza	**Maricel Soriano — Saan darating ang Umaga**; Alicia Alonzo — Bago kumalat ang Kamandag; Celia Rodriguez — Ang Boyfriend kong Kano'; Liza Lorena — Don't Cry for me, Papa; Julie Vega — Isang bala ka lang; Grace Amilbangsa — Karnal; Armida Siguion-Reyna — Paano ba ang Mangarap
Best Child Actor	Best Child Actress
**Jaypee de Guzman — Saan Darating ang Umaga**; Niño Muhlach — Hula; Marco Polo Garcia — Pieta; Ryan Soler — Umpisahan Mo... Tatapusin ko	**Manilyn Reynes — Minsan, may isang ina**; Harlene Bautista — Broken Marriage; Sheryl Cruz — Home sweet home
Best in Screenplay	Best Story
Andrea Benedicto, Nerissa Cabral & Orlando Nadres — Paano ba ang mangarap?:	Nerissa Cabral — Paano ba ang mangarap?:
Best Sound	Best Musical Score
**Rudy Balvino — Karnal**	**Rayan Cayabyab — Karnal**
Best Cinematography	Best Editing
Romy Vitug — Paano ba ang mangarap?: Isagani Sioson — Pedro Tunasan	**Ike Jarlego Jr. — Nagalit ang Buwan sa Haba ng Gabi**
Best Theme Song	Production Design
**George Canseco — Paanoba ang Mangarap**	**Fidel Zabat — Karnal**

=== Special Awardee ===
- **Lifetime Achievement Award**
  - **Ben Perez**
