= List of people who won the Philippine movie grand slam =

The Grand Slam in the Philippine movie industry refers to people who have won all four major film awards in the same category in the same year. The four major organizations that evaluate all Filipino films released in the country and hand out awards for best cinematic output in various categories in a calendar year are the:

- Filipino Academy of Movie Arts and Sciences (FAMAS) – It is the country's oldest movie award-giving body and was established in 1953. It is the successor of the Maria Clara Awards.
- Manunuri ng Pelikulang Pilipino (MPP) – It is the country's premier film critics group composed of 10 esteemed film scholars and National Artists as members and was established in 1976. It is the country's counterpart of the New York Film Critics Circle (NYFCC). It hands out the annual Gawad Urian Awards, the only awards that uses Filipino language. Its first awards were given in 1977.
- Film Academy of the Philippines (FAP) – It is the country's counterpart of the Academy of Motion Picture Arts and Sciences (AMPAS). It was established in 1981 as the official film industry organization. It hands out the Luna Awards (formerly known as FAP Awards), equivalent of the Oscars. Its first awards were given in 1983.
- Philippine Movie Press Club (PMPC) – It was established in 1985 and hands out the Star Awards for Movies. It also hands out television awards, starting in 1987. This made the PMPC as the country's counterpart of the Hollywood Foreign Press Association (HFPA) and made Star Awards the equivalent of the Golden Globe Awards but it holds the movie and television awarding ceremonies separately rather than as a whole.

== Background ==
The term "grand slam" was coined in 1983, when Vilma Santos won the Best Actress award from FAMAS, Urian, FAP and the Catholic Mass Media Awards (CMMA) for her performance in Relasyon. The Catholic Mass Media Awards were created in 1978 and beside movies, they also honor television, radio, print, advertising and music. This awards were part of the original four major awards. When Star Awards were created in 1985, there were five major awards. Ever since the CMMA ceased giving out acting awards sometime in the 1990s, this awards had been relegated as a minor award. Today, "grand slam" has been generally used to refer to winning awards in FAMAS, Urian, Luna and Star in the same year for the same category. In FAMAS Awards, people who had won five awards in a certain competitive category are given Hall of Fame awards and cannot be nominated anymore in any subsequent ceremony. These people can still get a "grand slam" if they win in the other three major awards.

There are rare instances in which an actor/actress won awards for the same role but was placed in different categories because the four organizations mixed up whether a role should be a lead or a supporting. Nevertheless, they still win a "grand slam". For example, Dennis Trillo almost won a "grand slam" for his role in Aishite Imasu 1941: Mahal Kita. He was placed in Best Supporting Actor at the FAMAS and Urian while being placed in Best Actor at the Luna (FAP) and Star. This also can occur when an actor/actress is placed in child categories while being placed in lead or supporting categories in other awards. Only FAMAS and Star give out the child categories. For example, Jiro Manio won Best Child Actor at the FAMAS for his role in Magnifico but won Best Actor at the other three awards.

Nevertheless, it still very rare that a "grand slam" happens, especially now with the boom of independent films in the country. Since 1983, there have been only 19 instances when a "grand slam" occurred.

A further achievement is winning awards given by other award-giving bodies such as the Young Critics Circle, Golden Screen, Gawad TANGLAW, Gawad PASADO and others.

Modern Era of Philippine Cinema post 2020

== Modern Grand Slam Best Actress Award ==
The Modern Grand Slam Best Actress Award is a special distinction presented by the Philippine Arts, Film and Television Academy (PAFTA) to recognize exceptional achievement in Philippine cinema during the modern era. The award is conferred upon an actress who wins at least four major Best Actress awards from recognized Philippine film-awarding institutions for a single performance within an awards cycle.

The distinction is based on the concept of a "Grand Slam" in Philippine cinema, a term commonly used to describe performers who receive multiple Best Actress honors from major award-giving bodies for the same role. The Modern Grand Slam Best Actress Award seeks to recognize contemporary achievements that demonstrate broad critical and industry acclaim.

== Criteria ==
To qualify for the Modern Grand Slam Best Actress Award, an actress must win at least four Best Actress awards from the following major Philippine film institutions:

1. Filipino Academy of Movie Arts and Sciences (FAMAS) Awards
2. Box Office Entertainment Awards (GMMSF)
3. Gawad Urian Awards Manunuri ng Pelikulang Pilipino
4. Film Academy of the Philippines (FAP) Awards
5. PMPC Star Awards for Movies
6. Cinemalaya Philippine Independent Film Festival Awards
7. EDDYS Awards
8. Metro Manila Film Festival (MMFF)

== Purpose ==
The award recognizes outstanding artistic achievement, critical excellence, and industry recognition in Philippine cinema. It is intended to honor performances that receive widespread acclaim across multiple award-giving organizations and represent a significant contribution to contemporary Filipino filmmaking.

== Notable Recipient ==
=== Marian Rivera ===
Marian Rivera was recognized as a recipient of the Modern Grand Slam Best Actress distinction for her performance in the film Balota.

Her qualifying Best Actress victories included:

- FAMAS Award for Best Actress (2025)
- Cinemalaya Philippine Independent Film Festival Best Actress Award (2024)
- EDDYS Award for Best Actress (2025)
- GMMSF Box Office Entertainment Award for Best Actress (2025)

By securing four major Best Actress awards for the same performance, Rivera satisfied the established criteria for the Modern Grand Slam Best Actress Award. Her achievement is regarded as a notable accomplishment in the modern era of Philippine cinema and reflects broad recognition from both critics and industry organizations.

== Significance ==
The Modern Grand Slam Best Actress Award is considered a recognition of excellence in contemporary Philippine filmmaking. It highlights performances that achieve distinction across multiple major award-giving institutions and serves as a benchmark for artistic achievement among actresses in the Philippine film industry.

== Winners ==
=== Best Actress ===
Year ^{A}	Name	Film/s	FAMAS	Urian	Luna (FAP)	Star	Ref.
1983	Vilma Santos^{B}	Relasyon	Yes	Yes	Yes	Not yet instituted	
1991	Nora Aunor	Andrea, Paano Ba ang Maging Isang Ina?	Yes	Yes	Yes	Yes	
1993	Lorna Tolentino	Narito ang Puso Ko	Yes	Yes	Yes	Yes	
1994	Vilma Santos	Dahil Mahal Kita (The Dolzura Cortez Story)	Hall of Famer	Yes	Yes	Yes	
1996	Nora Aunor	The Flor Contemplacion Story	Hall of Famer	Yes; tied with Helen Gamboa, Bagong Bayani	Yes	Yes	
1997	Sharon Cuneta	Madrasta	Yes	Yes; tied with Nora Aunor, Bakit May Kahapon Pa?	Yes	Yes	
1999	Vilma Santos	Bata, Bata, Paano Ka Ginawa?	Hall of Famer	Yes	Yes	Yes; tied with Nida Blanca, Sana Pag-ibig Na	
2000	Elizabeth Oropesa	Bulaklak ng Maynila	Yes	Yes	Yes	Yes	
2003	Vilma Santos	Dekada '70	Hall of Famer	Yes	Yes	Yes	

=== Best Actor ===
Year ^{A}	Name	Film/s	FAMAS	Urian	Luna (FAP)	Star	Ref.
1986	Phillip Salvador	Bayan Ko: Kapit sa Patalim	Yes	Yes	Yes	Yes	
1991	Christopher de Leon	Biktima and My Other Woman	Yes, for My Other Woman	Yes, for My Other Woman	Yes, for Biktima	Yes, for Biktima	
2004	Jiro Manio	Magnifico	Yes^{C}	Yes	Yes	Yes	

=== Best Supporting Actress ===
Year ^{A}	Name	Film/s	FAMAS	Urian	Luna (FAP)	Star	Ref.
1987	Nida Blanca^{B}	Magdusa Ka	Yes	Yes; tied with Anita Linda, Takaw Tukso	Yes	Yes	
1997	Gina Alajar	Mulanay: Sa Pusod ng Paraiso	Yes	Yes	Yes	Yes	
2000	Glydel Mercado	Sidhi	Yes	Yes	Yes	Yes; tied with Rufa Mae Quinto, Dahil May Isang Ikaw	

=== Best Supporting Actor ===
Year ^{A}	Name	Film/s	FAMAS	Urian	Luna (FAP)	Star	Ref.
1994	Ronaldo Valdez	May Minamahal	Yes	Yes	Yes	Yes	
2003	Piolo Pascual	Dekada '70	Yes	Yes	Yes	Yes	

=== Best Director ===
Year ^{A}	Name	Film/s	FAMAS	Urian	Luna (FAP)	Star	Ref.
2004	Maryo J. De los Reyes	Magnifico	Yes	Yes	Yes	Yes	

=== Best Sound ===
Year ^{A}	Name	Film/s	FAMAS	Urian	Luna (FAP)	Star	Ref.
1992	Gaudencio Barredo	Hihintayin Kita sa Langit	Yes	Yes	Yes	Yes	

^A Year is based on when the Grand Slam was received, not the year when the film was released.
^B Won the Grand Slam, including the CMMA.
^C Was placed in Best Child Actor at the FAMAS while being placed in Best Actor at the other three majors.

== Failed bids ==
Year^{A}	Category	Name	Film/s	FAMAS	Urian	Luna (FAP)	Star	Ref.
1985	Best Actor	Rudy Fernandez	Batuigas: Pasukuin si Waway	Yes	No, not nominated; lost to Jay Ilagan, Sister Stella L.	Yes	Yes	
1986	Best Actress	Nida Blanca	Miguelito: Batang Rebelde	No; lost to Vivian Velez, Paradise Inn	Yes; tied with Gina Alajar, Kapit sa Patalim: Bayan Ko	Yes	Yes	
1988	Best Director	Eddie Garcia	Saan Nagtatago ang Pag-ibig?	Yes	No award ceremony was held	Yes	Yes	
1990	Best Actor	Tirso Cruz III	Bilangin Ang Bituin Sa Langit	Yes	No; lost to Daniel Fernando, Macho Dancer	Yes	Yes	
1991	Best Director	Lino Brocka	Gumapang Ka sa Lusak	Yes	No; lost to Laurice Guillen, Kapag Langit ang Humatol	Yes	Yes	
1991	Best Supporting Actress	Gina Alajar	Andrea, Paano Ba ang Maging Isang Ina? and Biktima	Yes, for Biktima	Yes, for Biktima	Yes, for Andrea, Paano Ba ang Maging Isang Ina?	No; lost to Snooky Serna, Hahamakin Lahat	
1992	Best Actor	Christopher de Leon	Ipagpatawad Mo	Yes	No; lost to Richard Gomez, Hihintayin Kita sa Langit	Yes	Yes	
1992	Best Actress	Nora Aunor	Ang Totoong Buhay ni Pacita M.	Hall of Famer	No; lost to Vilma Santos, Ipagpatawad Mo	Yes	Yes	
1993	Best Director	Carlos Siguion-Reyna	Ikaw pa Lang ang Minahal	Yes	Yes	Yes	Unknown	
1993	Best Screenplay	Raquel Villavicencio	Ikaw pa Lang ang Minahal	Yes	Yes	Yes	Unknown	
1996	Best Director	Joel Lamangan	The Flor Contemplacion Story	No; lost to Willie Milan and Ronwaldo Reyes/Fernando Poe, Jr., Kahit Butas ng Karayom, Papasukin Ko	Yes	Yes	Yes	
1996	Best Supporting Actress	Jaclyn Jose	The Flor Contemplacion Story	No; lost to Armida Siguion-Reyna, Inagaw Mo ang Lahat sa Akin	Yes	Yes	Yes	
1996	Best Actor	Richard Gomez	Dahas	Yes	No; lost to Aga Muhlach, Sana Maulit Muli	Yes	Yes	
1998	Best Actress	Zsa Zsa Padilla	Batang PX	No; lost to Maricel Soriano, Nasaan Ang Puso	Yes	Yes	Yes	
1999	Best Director	Marilou Diaz-Abaya	Jose Rizal	Yes	Yes	No; lost to Edgardo Vinarao, Birador	Yes	
1999	Best Supporting Actor	Jaime Fabregas	Jose Rizal	Yes	Yes	No; lost to Carlo Aquino, Bata, Bata, Paano Ka Ginawa?	Yes	
1999	Best Production Design	Leo Abaya	Jose Rizal	Yes	Yes	No; lost to Manny Morfe, Bata, Bata, Paano Ka Ginawa?	Yes	
1999	Best Musical Score	Nonong Buencamino	Jose Rizal	Yes	Yes	No; lost to Dennis Garcia, Pusong Mamon	Yes	
2001	Best Director	Laurice Guillen	Tanging Yaman	Yes	Yes	Yes	No; lost to Mike de Leon, Bayaning 3rd World	
2001	Best Actress	Gloria Romero	Tanging Yaman	Yes	Yes	Yes	No; lost to Vilma Santos, Anak	
2001	Best Supporting Actor	Jeffrey Quizon	Markova: Comfort Gay	Yes	Yes	No, not nominated; lost to Pen Medina, Deathrow	Yes	
2003	Best Director	Gil Portes	Mga Munting Tinig	Yes	Yes	No, not nominated; lost to William Mayo, Lapu-Lapu	Yes	
2004	Best Screenplay	Michiko Yamamoto	Magnifico	No, not nominated; lost to Roy Iglesias, Filipinas	Yes	Yes	Yes	
2005	Best Supporting Actor ^{B}	Dennis Trillo	Aishite Imasu 1941: Mahal Kita	Yes	No; lost to Wendell Ramos, Sabel	Yes	Yes	
2006	Best Cinematography	Charlie Peralta	Nasaan Ka Man	Yes	No; lost to Nap Jamir III, Ang Pagdadalaga ni Maximo Oliveros	Yes	Yes	
2007	Best Director	Jose Javier Reyes	Kasal, Kasali, Kasalo	Yes	No; lost to Jeffrey Jeturian, Kubrador	Yes	Yes	
2007	Best Actress	Judy Anne Santos	Kasal, Kasali, Kasalo	Yes	No; lost to Gina Pareño, Kubrador	Yes	Yes	
2007	Best Supporting Actress	Gina Pareño	Kasal, Kasali, Kasalo	Yes	No; lost to Meryll Soriano, Rotonda	Yes	Yes	
2007	Best Screenplay	Jose Javier Reyes	Kasal, Kasali, Kasalo	Yes	No; shared with Mary Ann Bautista; lost to Chris Violago and Connie S.A. Macatuno, Rome and Juliet	Yes; shared with Mary Ann Bautista	Yes	
2007	Best Musical Score	Vincent de Jesus	ZsaZsa Zaturnnah Ze Moveeh	No, not nominated; lost to Jesse Lucas, Kasal, Kasali, Kasalo	Yes	Yes	Yes	
2009	Best Cinematography	Lee Meily	Baler	Yes	No, not nominated; lost to Odyssey Flores, Serbis	Yes	Yes	
2009	Best Production Design	Aped Santos	Baler	Yes	No, not nominated; lost to Benjamin Padero and Carlo Tabije, Serbis	Yes	Yes	
2009	Best Sound	Ditoy Aguila	Baler	Yes	No, not nominated; lost to Romy Lopez and Eduardo Velasques, Yanggaw	Yes	Yes	
2011	Best Production Design	Joey Luna	Rosario	Yes	No, not nominated; lost to Rodell Cruz, Amigo	Yes	Yes; shared with Miki Hahn	
2012	Best Actor	Jorge Estregan, Jr.	Manila Kingpin: The Asiong Salonga Story	Yes	No, not nominated; lost to Paulo Avelino, Ang Sayaw ng Dalawang Kaliwang Paa	Yes	Yes; tied with Aga Muhlach, In the Name of Love	
2012	Best Editing	Jason Cahapay and Ryan Orduña	Manila Kingpin: The Asiong Salonga Story	Yes; shared with Mirana Medina-Bhunjun	No, not nominated; lost to Lawrence Fajardo, Amok	Yes	Yes	
2012	Best Sound	Albert Michael Idioma	Amok, Manila Kingpin: The Asiong Salonga Story and In the Name of Love	No, not nominated; lost to Ditoy Aguila, Lucy Quinto, Warren Santiago and Ariel Serafin, Ang Panday 2	Yes, for Amok; shared with Addiss Tabong	Yes, for Manila Kingpin: The Asiong Salonga Story	Yes, for In the Name of Love	
2013	Best Actress	Angel Locsin	One More Try	Yes	No, not nominated; lost to Nora Aunor, Thy Womb	Yes	Yes	
2013	Best Cinematography	Carlo Mendoza	El Presidente	Yes	No, not nominated; lost to Whammy Alcazaren, Colossal	Yes	Yes	
2013	Best Production Design	Danny Red and Joel Bilbao	El Presidente	Yes	No, not nominated; lost to Brillante Mendoza, Thy Womb	Yes	Yes	
2014	Best Sound	Corinne de San Jose	On the Job	Yes	Yes	No award ceremony was held	Yes	
2016	Best Editing	Jerrold Tarog	Heneral Luna	No, not nominated; lost to Carlo Francisco Manatad, Para sa Hopeless Romantic	Yes	Yes	Yes	
2016	Best Sound	Mikko Quizon	Heneral Luna	No, not nominated; lost to Addiss Tabong, You're My Boss	Yes	Yes	Yes; shared with Hit Productions	
2017	Best Actress	Hasmine Kilip	Pamilya Ordinaryo	No, not nominated; lost to Angelica Panganiban, The Unmarried Wife	Yes	Yes	Yes (as New Movie Actress of the Year)	
2018	Best Supporting Actress	Odette Khan	Bar Boys	Yes	Yes	No, not nominated; lost to Jasmine Curtis-Smith, Siargao	Yes	
2018	Best Actress	Joanna Ampil	Ang Larawan	No, lost to Agot Isidro, Changing Partners	Yes	Yes	Yes (as New Movie Actress of the Year)	
2019	Best Cinematography	Neil Daza	Oda Sa Wala, Gusto Kita With All My Hypothalamus & Kung Paano Hinihintay Ang Dapithapon	Yes, for Oda Sa Wala	Nominated for Signal Rock; lost to Neil Bion, BuyBust	Yes, for Gusto Kita With All My Hypothalamus	Yes, for Kung Paano Hinihintay Ang Dapithapon (Indie Movie Cinematographer of the Year)	
2021/22	Best Actress	Alessandra De Rossi	Watch List	Yes	Yes	No award ceremony was held	Yes (tied with Sylvia Sanchez for Coming Home)	
2022/23	Best Production Design	Whammy Alcazaren	Kun Maupay Man It Panahon	Yes	Yes	No award ceremony was held	Yes	
2023	Best Editing	Lawrence Ang	Leonor Will Never Die, Livescream	Nominated for Leonor Will Never Die; lost to Beng Bandong, Family Matters	Yes, for Leonor Will Never Die	Yes, for Leonor Will Never Die	Yes, for Livescream (Indie Movie Editor of the Year)	
2024	Best Supporting Actor	LA Santos	In His Mother's Eyes	Yes	Not nominated; won by Ronnie Lazaro, The Gospel of the Beast	Yes	Yes (tied with JC Santos, Mallari)	
2024	Best Cinematography	Carlo Mendoza	GomBurZa	Yes	Yes	Yes	Nominated; lost to Neil Daza, Firefly	
2024	Best Sound	Albert Michael Idioma	Rewind, GomBurZa, Apag	Yes, for Rewind, shared with Emilio Bien Sparks and Michael Keanu Cruz	Nominated for GomBurZa, lost to Lamberto Casas Jr. and Alex Tomboc, Iti Mapukpukaw	Yes, for GomBurZa, shared with Jannina Mikaela Minglanilla and Emilio Bien Sparks	Yes, for Apag (Indie Movie Sound Engineer of the Year)	

Lost in this award.

^A Year is based on when the Grand Slam might be received, not the year when the film was released.
^B Was placed in Best Supporting Actor at the FAMAS and Urian while being placed in Best Actor at the Luna (FAP) and Star. He was originally placed in supporting role at the 2004 Metro Manila Film Festival.
