= Biktima (1990 film) =

1990 horror thriller film by Lino Brocka

- Directed by: Lino Brocka
- Written by: Jose Dalisay Jr.; Roy C. Iglesias
- Produced by: Boy C. De Guia
- Starring: Sharon Cuneta; Christopher de Leon
- Cinematography: Clodualdo Austria; Pedro Manding Jr.
- Edited by: George Jarlego
- Music by: Jaime Fabregas
- Production company: Viva Films
- Distributed by: Viva Films
- Release date: November 29, 1990
- Running time: 114 minutes
- Country: Philippines
- Language: Filipino

Biktima (transl. Victim) is a 1990 Philippine horror thriller film directed by Lino Brocka from a story and screenplay written by Jose Dalisay Jr. and Roy C. Iglesias. Starring Sharon Cuneta and Christopher de Leon, the story follows a human rights lawyer who falls in love with a man who turned out to be the one who raped her client.

Produced and distributed by Viva Films, the film was theatrically released on November 29, 1990.

== Synopsis ==
Human rights lawyers Becca Dizon and Dave Pascual were tasked to prosecute prominent scion Jing Aureus for allegedly raping Laura Malicat. Jing, a son of Congressman Aureus and fiancé to socialite Fey Navarro, uses his connections to overturn a possible guilty verdict to avoid jail time. After the case was overturned, he befriends Atty. Dizon, and tries to strike a romantic relationship with her, with underlying motives.

== Cast ==
- Sharon Cuneta as Atty. Becca Dizon
- Christopher de Leon as Jing Aureus
- Gina Alajar as Laura Malicat
- Rowell Santiago as Atty. Dave Pascual
- Nanette Medved as Fey Navarro: Jing's fiancée
- William Lorenzo as Sonny
- Lucita Soriano as Tiya Edad
- Johnny Wilson as Congressman Aureus
- Lollie Mara as Mrs. Aureus
- Jess Ramos as Atty. Cuevas
- Nanding Fernandez as Fey's Father
- Lulu Arietta as Fey's Mother
- Joji Isla as Bank Manager
- Dodie Lacuna as TV Newscaster
- Millet Advincula as Female TV Host
- Ben Rivera as Mang Dino
- Carmi Matic as Sherry
- Susing Sayson as Aling Susing
- Robert Talabis as Col. De Guia

== Production ==
=== Casting ===
Dawn Zulueta was originally cast as Fey Navarro, but turned it down. Eventually, the role went to Nanette Medved.

=== Filming ===
Christopher de Leon accepted his mentor's request to direct his character's death scene, despite his reluctance. Bey Vito, the assistant director, helped him to do it while Brocka went overseas for film festival appearances.

== Reception ==
=== Accolades ===
Award-giving organization	Date of ceremony	Category	Recipient(s)	Result	Ref.
7th PMPC Star Awards for Movies	March 16, 1991	Best Actor	Christopher de Leon	Won	
14th Gawad Urian Awards	1991	Best Supporting Actress	Gina Alajar	Won	
39th FAMAS Awards	May 11, 1991	Best Supporting Actress	Gina Alajar	Won	
9th FAP Awards	May 25, 1991	Best Actor	Christopher de Leon	Won	
9th FAP Awards	May 25, 1991	Best Actress	Sharon Cuneta	Nominated	
9th FAP Awards	May 25, 1991	Best Screenplay	Jose F. Dalisay	Nominated	
9th FAP Awards	May 25, 1991	Best Cinematography	Pedro Manding and Cloduald Austria	Nominated	
9th FAP Awards	May 25, 1991	Best Musical Score	Jaime Fabregas	Nominated	
9th FAP Awards	May 25, 1991	Best Sound	Vic Macamay	Nominated	
Catholic Mass Media Awards	1991	Best Supporting Actor	William Lorenzo	Nominated	
Catholic Mass Media Awards	1991	Best Supporting Actress	Gina Alajar	Won	
