= Paul Dumol =

Paul A. Dumol is a Philippine playwright, historian and educator. He is a member of the Philippine Center for Civic Education and Democracy and has served as its chair. He is author of the A History of the Filipino People for High Schools.

He graduated as a summa cum laude and valedictorian, Bachelor of Arts in Communication Arts at the Ateneo de Manila. He then completed his Master of Liberal Arts with specialization in Philosophy at the University of Navarra. He holds a licentiate in Medieval Studies with specialization in Philosophy from the Pontifical Institute for Medieval Studies. He gained his Doctor of Philosophy in Medieval Studies from the University of Toronto.

His play Ang Paglilitis kay Mang Serapio (The Trial of Mang Serapio, 1968) is considered by some as the first Philippine modernist play. Other plays include Kabesang Tales, Libretto of Ang Pagpatay kay Antonio Luna. Many of his plays revolve around historical figures.

In 2014, His work Manila Synod of 1582: The Draft of Its Handbook for Confessors won the Philippine national book award for best translation

He received the Pambansang Alagad ni Balagtas in the field of drama from the Unyon ng Manunulat ng Pilipinas (2002), Centennial Honors for the Arts in the field of drama from the Cultural Center of the Philippines (1999).

He was Vice-President for Academic Affairs at the University of Asia and the Pacific until 2007. He lectures on philosophy and the aesthetics of film and also teaches film scriptwriting to Humanities students.
