= Sa 'yo Lamang =

- Theatrical movie poster
- Directed by: Laurice Guillen
- Screenplay by: Ricardo Lee; Ralph Jacinto Quiblat; Anna Karenina L. Ramos
- Story by: Ricardo Lee; Ralph Jacinto Quiblat; Anna Karenina L. Ramos; Mia Louise Ramos; John Paul E. Abellera
- Produced by: Charo Santos-Concio; Malou Santos
- Starring: Lorna Tolentino; Christopher de Leon; Bea Alonzo; Diether Ocampo; Coco Martin; Enchong Dee; Shaina Magdayao; Zanjoe Marudo; Lauren Young; Empress Schuck; Miles Ocampo
- Cinematography: Lee Briones Meily
- Edited by: Efren Jarlego
- Music by: Von De Guzman
- Production companies: Star Cinema; CCM Creatives
- Distributed by: Star Cinema
- Release date: September 1, 2010 (Philippines)
- Running time: 105 minutes
- Country: Philippines
- Language: Filipino
- Box office: ₱50.2 million

Sa 'yo Lamang (Only Yours) is a 2010 Filipino religious-family drama film directed by Laurice Guillen from a story and screenplay written by Ricky Lee, Ralph Jacinto Quilbat, and Anna Karenina L. Ramos, with Mia Louise Ramos and John Paul E. Abellera as the co-writers of the former.

Produced and distributed by Star Cinema as the offering for its 17th anniversary, the film was theatrically released in the Philippines on September 1, 2010.

== Synopsis ==
Another religious drama by Laurice Guillen, director of Tanging Yaman, the film revolves around love, faith and life. Sa ‘yo Lamang stars Christopher de Leon, Lorna Tolentino, Bea Alonzo, Coco Martin, Enchong Dee, Miles Ocampo, Shaina Magdayao and Empress Schuck.

== Plot ==
Dianne seems to have a happy family. She and her mom just bought a house for them, her younger siblings are doing great at school, and her boyfriend of two years is already preparing for their future together. But everything in her life shatters when her dad, Franco, returns after ten years of being with his mistress. More than the irritating presence of Franco, what hurts Dianne the most is how her mom wholeheartedly accepts Franco back to live with them again, and how her siblings allow him to be their father again, as if he never left. Confused and hurt, Dianne does everything to throw Franco out of their lives. But as she succeeds with her plans, she is shocked to learn that their family's problem is more than the return of the man who has hurt her in the past. And thus begins the journey of Dianne and her family as they discover their family's secrets.

== Cast and characters ==
=== Main cast ===
- Christopher de Leon as Franco Alvero - Franco is the father of Dianne, Coby, James and Lisa and also Amanda's husband.
- Lorna Tolentino as Amanda Alvero - Amanda is the mother of Dianne, Coby, James and Lisa and also Franco's wife.

=== Supporting cast ===
- Bea Alonzo as Dianne
- Coco Martin as Coby
- Enchong Dee as James
- Miles Ocampo as Lisa
- Shaina Magdayao as Karen
- Zanjoe Marudo as John
- Diether Ocampo as Paul
- Lauren Young as Lorraine
- Empress Schuck as Agnes

=== Special Participation ===
- Dominic Ochoa as Father Eric
- Igi Boy Flores as Kennedy
- John Manalo as young Coby

== Reception ==
=== Reviews ===
This film is graded A by the Cinema Evaluation Board of the Philippines and rated PG-13 by the Movie and Television Review and Classification Board. The film lead the nominations in 27th PMPC Star Awards for Movies, having thirteen nominations, but the film failed to win any of the awards. The Film Academy of the Philippines awarded Lorna Tolentino the Best Actress of the year award during the 29th Luna Awards.

=== Soundtrack ===
The official theme song titled Sa 'Yo Lamang, is sung by Juris together with the Ars Cantica Ensemble. The official music video was directed by Cathy Garcia-Molina.

=== International screenings ===
The film had international screenings on September 17, 2010, in select cities in the United States such as Las Vegas, NV, San Francisco, CA, Los Angeles, CA, San Diego, CA, Seattle, WA, Honolulu, HI, Bergenfield, NJ, Milpitas, CA, Chicago, IL. It will also have screenings in Ontario, Alberta and Vancouver in Canada, and Guam.

=== Box office ===
The film grossed ₱20 million on its first week falling at number two behind Despicable Me. Within the film's 4th week, it had grossed a total of ₱48 million.

=== Accolades ===
At the 2011 Box Office Entertainment Awards, Sa 'yo Lamang received an award for Prince of Philippine Movies (Martin).
