= Ikaw Ay Akin =

1978 romantic drama film by Ishmael Bernal

- Re-release poster
- Directed by: Ishmael Bernal
- Screenplay by: Jose N. Carreon
- Story by: Ishmael Bernal; Jose N. Carreon
- Produced by: Espiridion Laxa
- Starring: Nora Aunor; Vilma Santos; Christopher de Leon
- Cinematography: Sergio Lobo
- Edited by: Augusto Salvador
- Music by: Vanishing Tribe
- Production company: Tagalog Ilang-Ilang Productions
- Distributed by: Tagalog Ilang-Ilang Productions (Note: The film's ownership rights is currently controlled by ABS-CBN Corporation.)
- Release date: December 8, 1978
- Running time: 124 minutes
- Country: Philippines
- Languages: Filipino; English

Ikaw Ay Akin (English: You Are Mine) is a 1978 Filipino romantic drama film directed by Ishmael Bernal and co-written by Jose N. Carreon. Starring Nora Aunor, Vilma Santos, and Christopher de Leon in leading roles, the story follows a man's guilt over his affair with another woman, which hurts his long-time girlfriend's feelings. It also features pre-stardom actors in minor roles, including Rene Requiestas, who would become one of the country's recognizable comedians, and Sandy Andolong, who would later become de Leon's wife.

Produced by Tagalog Ilang-Ilang Productions and theatrically released on December 8, 1978, the film also became famous for the experimental long shot scene of the reunion between Sandra and Tere, with the two confronting each other using only their eyes. It has since been known for popularizing the term "mata-mata (eye to eye) acting."

Ikaw Ay Akin has been digitally restored and remastered by the ABS-CBN Film Archives through the facilities of Central Digital Lab in Makati City, Metro Manila.

== Synopsis ==
Rex Aguilar, a young man who is a business professional and a sky-diving enthusiast, feels guilty when he gets involved in a love triangle with two women. The first one is Tere, a horticulturist who has been his lover for five years, while the other one is Sandra, an art designer whom he met at a business meeting.

== Cast ==
- Nora Aunor as Teresita "Tere" Valdez
- Vilma Santos as Sandra Aragon
- Christopher de Leon as Rex Aguilar
- Nick Romano
- Ellen Esguerra
- Zandro Zamora
- Odette Khan
- Ven Medina
- Ernie Zarate
- Angel Confiado
- Renato Requiestas
- Ricky Rivero
- Ogie Sanchez
- Eddie Recto
- Joey Sison
- Cris Vertido
- Anton Juan
- Catherine Santos
- Charmie Benavidez
- Philippine Air Force Sky Diving Team
- Col. Apolonio de Jesus Jr.
- Maj. Ed Calvo
- Aida Carmona
- Estrella Antonio
- Edgar Zabala
- William Tan
- Helen Plata
- Louella Albornoz
- Butch Borromeo
- Ricky Alvendia
- Ernie Plata
- Evelyn Vargas
- Sandy Andolong

== Release ==
The film was first released on December 8, 1978, sixteen days before the 1978 Metro Manila Film Festival.

=== Digital restoration ===
The restored version premiered on November 14, 2015, as part of the 2015 Cinema One Originals. The premiere was attended by the family of Ishmael Bernal; film screenwriter Jose Carreon; Mon Confiado (representing his late father), actor Junjun Quintana; one of the film's cast members Evelyn Vargas-Knaebel; former actress Cecille Castillo; vice head of the National Committee on Cinema, Teddy Co; Ricky Orellana, head of Mowelfund Audiovisual Archives; writers Mario A. Hernando and Raquel Villavicencio; and director Joyce Bernal. Myx VJ, Ai dela Cruz hosted the premiere event.

The restored version also received a free-to-air television premiere on ABS-CBN and its high-definition service on February 4, 2018, as a feature presentation for its Sunday late-night program, Sunday's Best. According to AGB Nielsen statistics, the showing received a nationwide rating of 1.1%, losing to GMA Network's showing of The Hangover: Part III, which received a nationwide rating of 2.4%.
