= Tatlong Taong Walang Diyos =

1976 war drama film by Mario O'Hara

- Theatrical release poster, released in 1976.
- Directed by: Mario O'Hara
- Written by: Mario O'Hara
- Produced by: Nora Villamayor; Christopher de Leon
- Starring: Nora Aunor; Christopher De Leon; Bembol Roco
- Cinematography: Conrado Baltazar
- Edited by: Efren Jarlego; Ike Jarlego Jr.
- Music by: Minda D. Azarcon
- Production company: NV Productions
- Release date: November 19, 1976
- Running time: 124 minutes
- Country: Philippines
- Languages: Filipino; Japanese

Tatlong Taong Walang Diyos (lit. 'Three Years Without God') is a 1976 Filipino period film written and directed by Mario O'Hara. Set in the province of Laguna during the Second World War, with the town of Majayjay as the primary shooting location, the film stars Nora Aunor as barrio lass Rosario, Christopher De Leon as Japanese-Filipino army officer Masugi, and Bembol Roco as army guerrilla fighter Crispin.

Produced by NV Productions, the film was theatrically released on November 19, 1976.

== Synopsis ==
The film, set during the Japanese Occupation of the Philippines between 1942 and 1944, tells the story of Rosario (Aunor), a young schoolteacher engaged to be married to Crispin (Roco). Crispin leaves Rosario to fight the Japanese as a guerrilla, and in his absence, a Japanese-Filipino officer named Masugi (De León) rapes her.

Masugi later returns to Rosario, apologizing for his act, which Rosario rejects; later, he learns that she is pregnant, and proposes to her. Rosario must make a choice: accept Masugi as her husband (ensuring safety for her family and her child), or reject him and the baby they conceived together.

== Plot ==
=== November 1941 ===
Crispin goes to the town elementary school to say goodbye to his teacher girlfriend, Rosario. He has joined the Army, in response to the impending war with Japan. Footage of the Japanese attack on Pearl Harbor follows, as well as footage of the Japanese arriving in Manila.

=== 1942 ===
Many townsfolk flee to the mountains due to stories of Japanese atrocities; Rosario's family decides to stay put. Crispin arrives with his friend from the Army; later, he tells stories of the Bataan Death March. He tells the family that he has decided to join the guerrilla forces to continue their struggle. Before he leaves, Rosario gives him a rosary and makes him promise to stay safe. Japanese soldiers later raid and take away the family's rice and livestock.

=== 1943 ===
The family is having dinner when two men, a Spaniard-Filipino and a Japanese officer, arrive, asking for directions. Rosario's father, Mang Andoy, gives them instructions; the Japanese officer asks for alcohol, and Mang Andoy has no choice but to comply. The Japanese officer introduces himself as Masugi, a Japanese-Filipino, and his best friend, Francis, an old family friend; the three men get drunk. Rosario demands they leave, and Masugi, insulted and intrigued, tries to kiss her. Mang Andoy attempts to intervene but is crippled by Masugi; Masugi covers the man with his pistol. Rosario runs; Masugi hands his pistol to Francis and chases Rosario to the house pig pen, where he shoves her to the floor and rapes her.

In the next few days, Masugi returns to the house, apologizing and bringing gifts of canned food and rice, which Rosario refuses. Rosario informs Masugi that she's pregnant; Masugi declares his love and proposes marriage.

During Sunday mass, Japanese soldiers enter the town church with a Makapili informer; a guerrilla dressed in drag shoots him. The soldiers fire into the crowd and later order all the women and children evacuated, holding only the men, including Mang Andoy. While the men are held in church, Rosario visits her father, bringing food, and her belly visibly swells. During one of her visits, she sees Masugi arrive with her mother, declaring that he will "take care of this". Rosario and her mother, Aling Sion, argue, with the latter urging the former to accept Masugi, and Rosario standing firmly against him.

=== 1944 ===
Rosario gives birth to a boy. Francis talks to her about Masugi's past, how his parents-- a Filipino mother and a Japanese father-- were killed by Filipinos, and how he has not been the same since. Rosario's influence has changed Masugi for the better, Francis tells her.

Rosario, thinking of Francis's words and remembering the rape, walks out of the house with the baby. Masugi and the family realize she's missing and frantically look for her. Masugi finds her kneeling at the top of a high bridge; when he approaches, he sees the child is still in her arms. Relieved, Masugi lifts his wife and child to his arms and goes home.

Crispin comes to visit; Aling Sion explains what happened to him. He asks Rosario if she loves him; Rosario says she doesn't know. Crispin pulls off the rosary Rosario gave him and throws it to the ground, leaving.

Rosario and Masugi are married by Padre Daniel and move to an abandoned house in the town. Rosario's family is killed by guerrillas. Crispin again visits, but this time Rosario has a gun pointed at him; Crispin denies having anything to do with her family's death. Rosario refuses to believe him, but Crispin collapses, wounded. Rosario, with Francis' help, cares for Crispin but needs medicines; she asks Masugi, who hesitates, but relents. When recovered, Masugi escorts Crispin to the edge of town and lets him go; the two argue and come to blows, but the fight ends in a stalemate.

=== Liberation, March 1945 ===
Rosario, Masugi, the baby, and Francis evacuate in an Imperial Army truck, but the guerrillas attack; Francis is killed, but Rosario, Masugi, and their child manage to escape to a hut in the forest. The guerrillas track down the couple and fire at the hut; Masugi fires back, urging Rosario to run with the baby while she can. Masugi is eventually killed by the guerrillas, and Rosario comes back to give him a fiery funeral (the Japanese tradition called kasō) by laying coconut husks on his corpse before setting it on fire.

Padre Daniel hides Rosario in the church. Rosario doesn't know what to do; Padre Daniel suggests a prayer. She prays for the safety of her child, but one of the townsfolk recognizes her. A crowd bursts into the church, snatches Rosario, and drags her in front of the altar, where they cut her hair. Rosario walks away from the townsfolk only to confront the guerrillas standing at the church entrance.

Crispin arrives the next day, and is directed to the small garden where he and Rosario said goodbye before the war. He finds her body and mourns her. Later, Padre Daniel transfers the care of Rosario and Masugi's child to Crispin, and they talk. Crispin asks if there is a god. Padre Daniel points to a blind man praying with his severely palsied brother lying on the ground before him, shaking, and tells Crispin that that is an example of "God's love". The blind man lifts his paralyzed brother, and they both leave the church.

== Cast and characters ==
- Nora Aunor as Rosario: A young schoolteacher in Majayjay, Laguna, and Crispin's fiancée. She was raped by Masugi, who would later become her husband. Her marriage to Masugi provoked the townsfolk, who believed she was a collaborator for the Japanese forces as well as a traitor.
- Christopher De Leon as Masugi: A Japanese-Filipino officer of the Imperial Japanese Army. He rapes Rosario, later marries her, and they have a child together.
- Rafael Roco Jr. as Crispin: Rosario's fiancé, who survived the Bataan Death March and continued his struggle as a guerrilla.
- Orlando Nadres as Padre Daniel: The town's parish priest. He officiated the wedding of Rosario and Masugi.
- Peque Gallaga as Francis: Masugi's best friend and a Spanish-Filipino collaborator for the Imperial Japanese Army.
- Mario Escudero as Mang Andoy: Rosario and Lito's father and Sion's husband.
- Yolanda Luna as Aling Sion: Rosario and Lito's mother and Andoy's wife.
- Liceto Tabalon Jr. as Lito: Rosario's younger brother.

Actor-director Joel Lamangan, while credited under the PETA Kalinangan Ensemble, was one of the angry mobs in the scene where they chase Rosario inside the church.

== Production ==
Scenes from the film were shot in Majayjay, Laguna.

=== Credits ===
- Mario O'Hara - writer and director
- Nora Aunor - producer
- Conrado Baltazar - cinematographer
- Minda D. Azarcon - music
- Christopher De Leon - executive producer
- Antonia Villamayor - associate producer
- Anastacio Villamayor - associate producer

== Digital restoration ==
In 2016, ABS-CBN Corporation commissioned the film to be digitally restored and remastered by L’Immagine Ritrovata in Bologna, Italy as part of their ABS-CBN Film Restoration Project. Supervised by Davide Pozzi, the restored version premiered at the 2016 Cinema One Originals film festival on November 15, 2016.

The restoration team has described this film as their "most difficult restoration to date", taking 1,450 hours to complete. The surviving best print, a 35mm print borrowed from the Cultural Center of the Philippines, suffered from a loss of color and details, but the team was able to restore much of the detail, clean up the images, and even bring back some of the colors.

Due to the color-fading damage of the film with magenta dominance, the restored film was regraded to black and white. This version does not replace the original restored version.

The premiere of the film's restored version was attended by Bembol Roco (one of the film's lead actors), Heber O'Hara (nephew of Mario O'Hara), and the staff of the ABS-CBN Film Archives. It is also attended by modern film directors Irene Villamor and Keith Sicat; actors including Rap Fernandez, Angel Aquino, Ria Atayde, Bernardo Bernardo, Karla Pambid, Ricky Davao, and Raphael Robes; and writers Mario Bautista and Juan Miguel Severo.

== Reception ==
=== Critical response ===
Reviews were positive, with Pio de Castro III of The Times Journal in 1976 calling it "one of the best films" of the year. Vincenzo Tagle stated in 2012 that it "still remains unsurpassed".

=== Accolades ===
Year	Group	Category	Nominee	Result
1977	FAMAS (Filipino Academy of Movie Arts and Sciences Awards)	Best Actress	Nora Aunor	Won
1977	FAMAS (Filipino Academy of Movie Arts and Sciences Awards)	Best Director	Mario O'Hara	Nominated
1977	FAMAS (Filipino Academy of Movie Arts and Sciences Awards)	Best Picture	NV Productions	Nominated
1977	Gawad Urian Awards (Manunuri ng Pelikulang Pilipino)	Best Actress	Nora Aunor	Won
1977	Gawad Urian Awards (Manunuri ng Pelikulang Pilipino)	Best in Cinematography	Conrado Baltazar	Nominated

== List of film festival exhibitions ==
- 1981 - Official Selection, Filipino Cinema Panorama, 3rd Festival Des 3 Continents, Nantes, Dec. 1–8
- 1995 - 2nd Asian Film Festival, Tokyo, Japan, December 18–19
- 2003 - Philippine Film Festival Fukuoka City, Japan, November 1–16
- 2004 - Asian Cinemas: “Fertile and Diverse,” National Film Center, The National Museum of Modern Art, Tokyo, May 19–26, 2004
