= Hanggang Kailan (TV series) =

2004 Philippine television drama series

- Title card
- Also known as: Circle of Hearts
- Genre: Romantic drama
- Created by: Jimmy Duavit; Jose Javier Reyes; Mark A. Reyes V
- Developed by: Bibeth Orteza
- Directed by: Jose Javier Reyes; Mark A. Reyes
- Starring: Christopher De Leon; Lorna Tolentino; Alice Dixson
- Theme music composer: Ogie Alcasid
- Opening theme: "Huwag Ka Lang Mawawala" (instrumental)
- Ending theme: "Huwag Ka Lang Mawawala" by Ogie Alcasid and Aiza Seguerra
- Country of origin: Philippines
- Original language: Tagalog
- No. of episodes: 103

Production
- Executive producer: Marjorie La Chica
- Producer: Jimmy Duavit
- Production locations: Metro Manila, Philippines
- Camera setup: Multiple-camera setup
- Running time: 30 minutes
- Production company: GMA Entertainment TV

Original release
- Network: GMA Network
- Release: March 8 – July 30, 2004

Hanggang Kailan (transl. until when / international title: Circle of Hearts) is a 2004 Philippine television drama romance series broadcast by GMA Network. Directed by Jose Javier Reyes and Mark A. Reyes V, it stars Lorna Tolentino, Christopher de Leon and Alice Dixson. It premiered on March 8, 2004, on the network's Telebabad line up. The series concluded on July 30, 2004, with a total of 103 episodes.

== Cast and characters ==
Cast

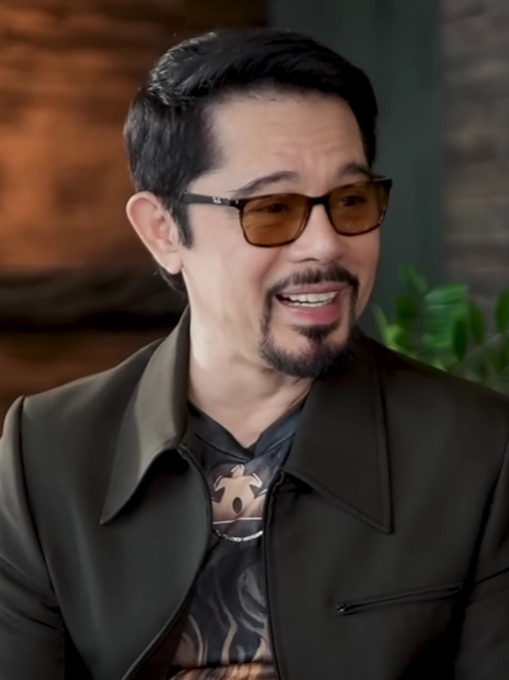
Christopher de Leon

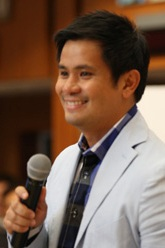
Ogie Alcasid

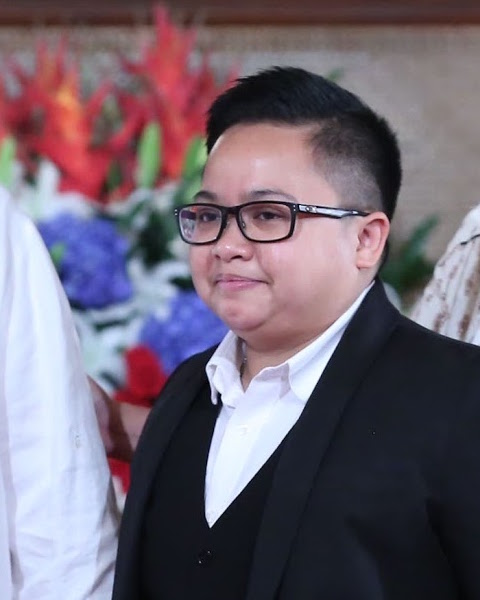
Aiza Seguerra

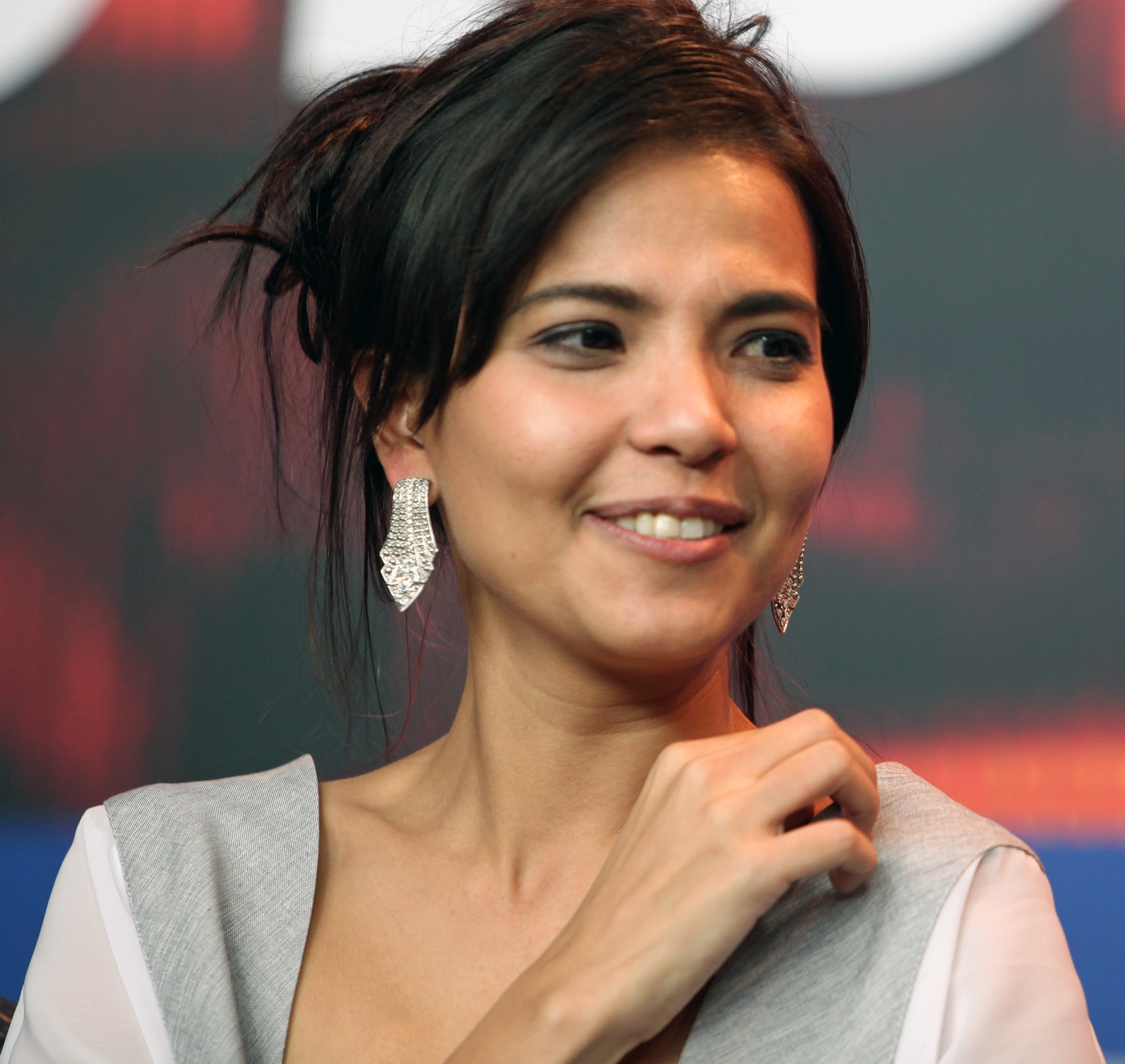
Alessandra De Rossi

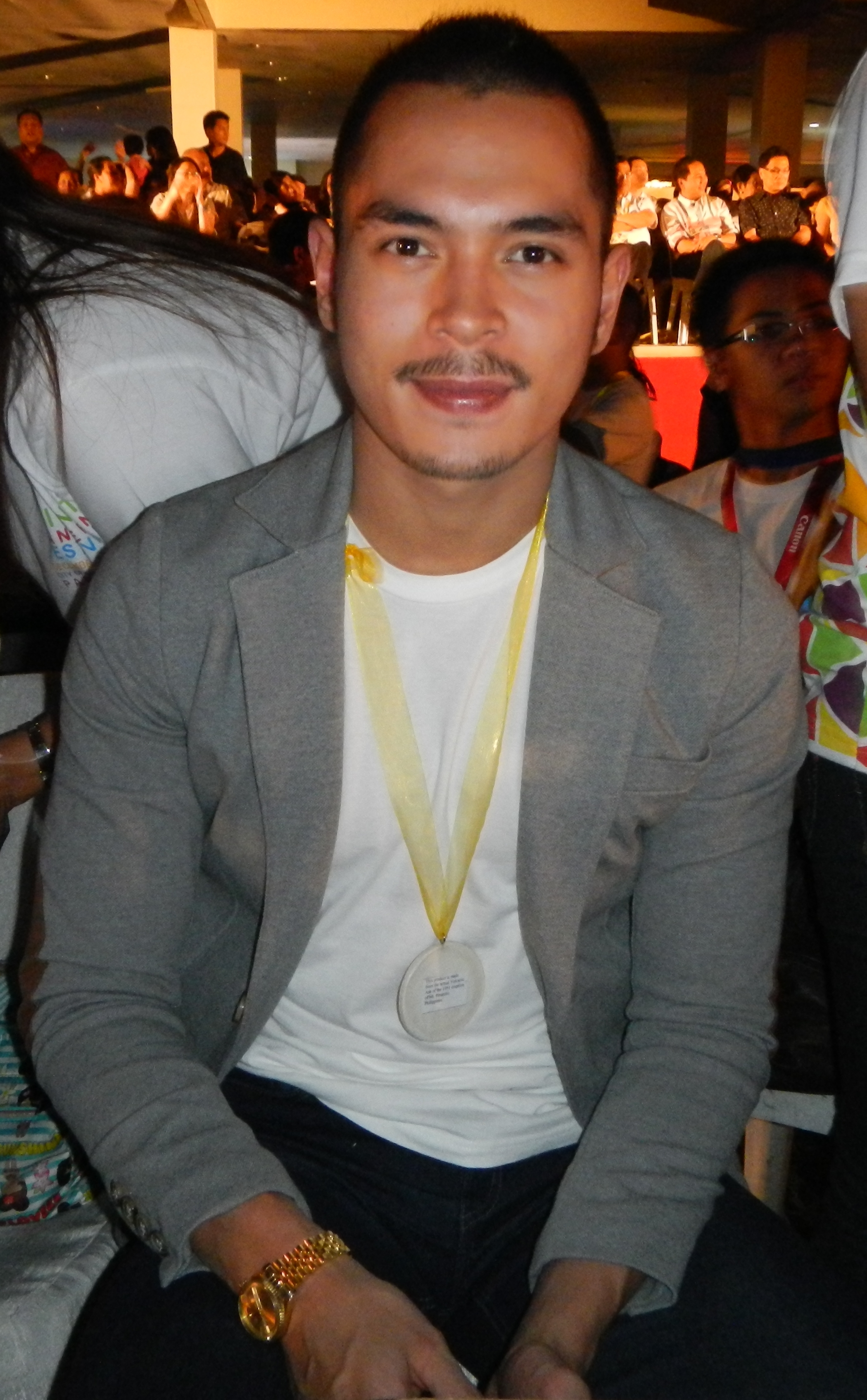
Jake Cuenca

Lead cast

- Lorna Tolentino as Valerie Rosales
- Christopher de Leon as Diosdado "Dado" Villarama
- Alice Dixson as Thelma Villarama

Supporting cast

- Ogie Alcasid as George
- Aiza Seguerra as Gina
- Ana Capri as Lulu
- Nancy Castiglione as Tara Rosales
- Maxene Magalona as Angela Villarama
- Alessandra De Rossi as Jennifer Villarama
- Jake Cuenca as Warren Rosales
- Paolo Contis as Dennis Carbonel

Recurring cast

- Sid Lucero as Eugene
- Janus Del Prado as Lito
- Boy 2 Quizon as Obet
- Girlie Sevilla as Marlyn
- Janice de Belen as Elizabeth
- Ricardo Cepeda as Jefferson
- Mark Gil as Roberto
- Gandong Cervantes as Victor
- Neil Ryan Sese as Edwin
- Cristine Reyes as Hana
- Jessy Mendiola as Gina
