= Weighed But Found Wanting =

1974 drama film by Lino Brocka

Tinimbang Ka Ngunit Kulang (Weighed But Found Wanting)
- Official movie poster
- Directed by: Lino Brocka
- Written by: Lino Brocka; Mario O'Hara
- Produced by: Raul S. Roco
- Starring: Lolita Rodriguez; Christopher De Leon; Mario O'Hara; Eddie Garcia; Lilia Dizon; Hilda Koronel
- Cinematography: Jose Batac
- Edited by: Augusto Salvador
- Music by: Lutgardo Labad; Emmanuel Lacaba
- Production company: CineManila Corporation
- Distributed by: Mever Films
- Release date: 30 May 1974
- Running time: 128 minutes
- Country: Philippines
- Language: Filipino

Weighed But Found Wanting (Filipino: Tinimbang Ka Ngunit Kulang; also known as Human Imperfections) is a 1974 Filipino drama film directed by Lino Brocka and co-written by Mario O'Hara. Starring Christopher De Leon in his debut role, Hilda Koronel, Lolita Rodriguez, and Eddie Garcia, the story follows a disillusioned young man who forms an unusual friendship with the town's pariahs: a man with leprosy and a madwoman.

Produced by CineManila Corporation and distributed by Mever Films, the film was theatrically released on 30 May 1974. It is considered one of Brocka's most important films and won six awards, including Best Picture, at the 23rd FAMAS Awards in 1975. In 2026, the film was digitally restored and remastered, in cooperation with the Film Development Council of the Philippines, Carlotta Films, and Janus Films.

== Plot ==
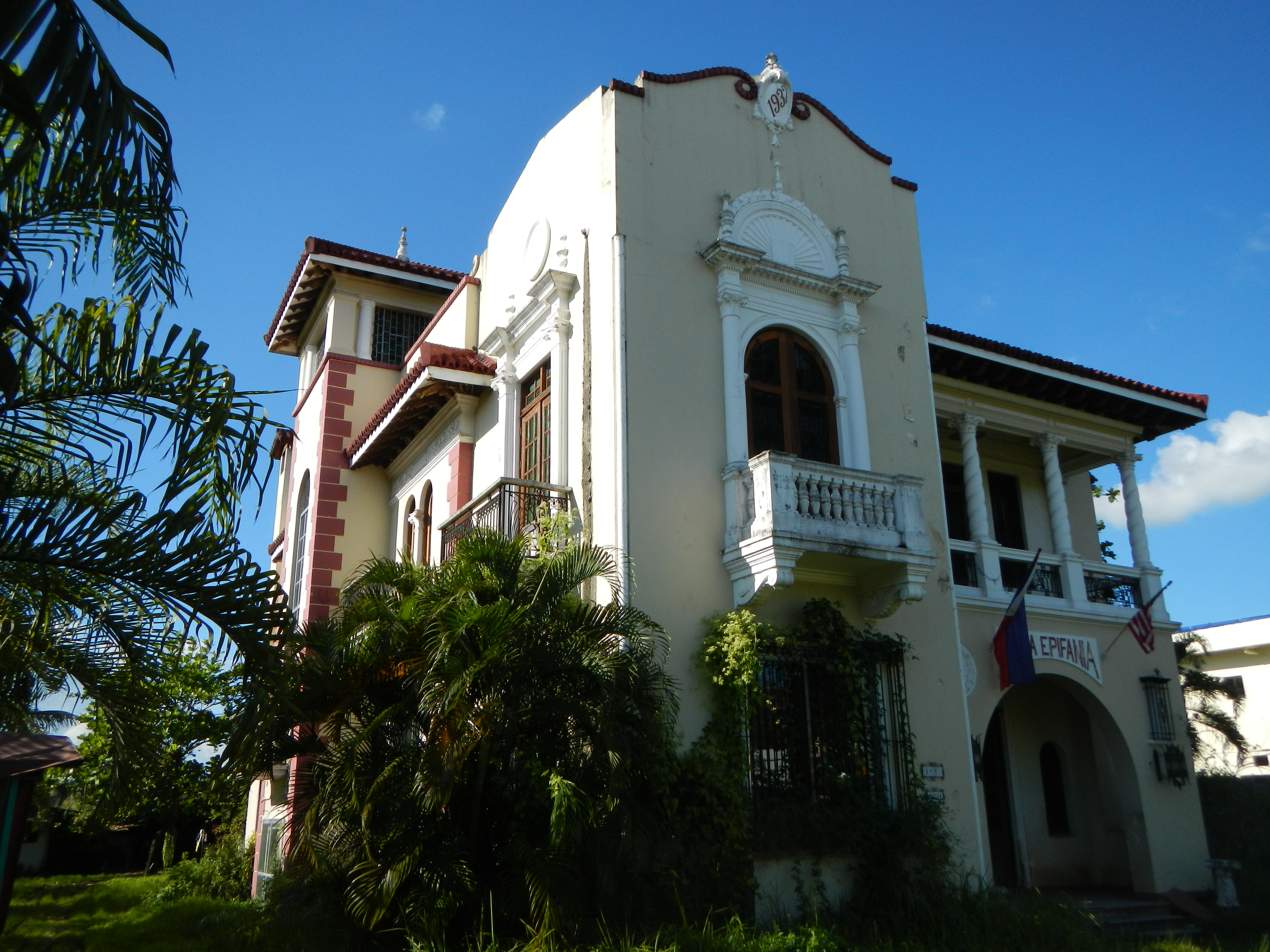
Villa Epifania (pictured in 2012) was one of the places in Santa Rita, Pampanga that were used for the film.

The story opens with a vivid flashback revealing the troubled past of a woman named Kuala. She undergoes an abortion performed by an herbolario (traditional folk medicine practitioner) while César observes. The procedure is successful, but upon seeing the aborted fetus, Kuala is deeply disturbed. In a subsequent scene, she wanders through a scorching grassy plain, her mental state deteriorating as the heat intensifies, leading her to madness.

In the present day, Kuala, now branded the village idiot, roams her Nueva Ecija town in tattered clothes and unkempt hair. The locals mock and ridicule her, culminating in a cruel act where she is shoved into a watering hole, narrowly escaping drowning.

Bertong Ketong, a leper longing for companionship, entices Kuala with a rattle and brings her to his ramshackle home in the cemetery. Junior befriends them, defying his father, César Blanco, a lawyer and unsuccessful politician.

Junior seeks Berto's counsel about his challenges with his eccentric teacher, Mr. Del Mundo, who harbors a crush on him, and with his girlfriend, Evangeline, who flirted with another during the recent Santacruzan. Consumed by jealousy, Junior leaves the procession and turns to Milagros, who seduces him.

The local Asociación de las Damas Cristianas is scandalized to learn that Kuala is pregnant. She is forced into the custody of the devout Lola Jacoba. During a secret visit, Kuala confides in Berto about her unhappiness. Berto shares this with Junior, who vows to help Kuala escape from Lola Jacoba's house and return her to Berto's shack. Realizing the dangers, Berto reluctantly returns her to Lola Jacoba, promising to rescue her after she gives birth.

A few nights later, Kuala goes into labor and makes her way to Berto’s shack. Berto rushes to find a doctor, but when the doctor refuses assistance, Berto takes him hostage, insisting he will not kill him. As they flee, the doctor’s wife screams for help, alerting the townspeople, who pursue them. Before reaching the shack, the doctor manages to escape, prompting a frantic chase. Policemen come to the doctor’s aid and shoot Berto. Junior witnesses this horrific act, collapsing in grief as he holds Berto's lifeless body amid the gathering crowd.

Junior then enters the shack where Kuala has just given birth to a son, although she is weakened by the ordeal. Gaining lucidity, she recognizes Junior and realizes Berto has died. Spotting César in the crowd, she accuses him of killing their child, unveiling his sinister secret. With her final strength, Kuala hands her baby boy to Junior before succumbing.

As Junior leaves the shack, he casts a piercing look at the townspeople, including his parents, Evangeline, and those who have treated him and Berto poorly. He pauses near Berto's corpse, and the onlookers fall into a somber silence. Ultimately, Junior departs the cemetery, carrying Berto and Kuala’s son, determined to forge a new path amidst the shadows of loss and betrayal.

== Cast ==
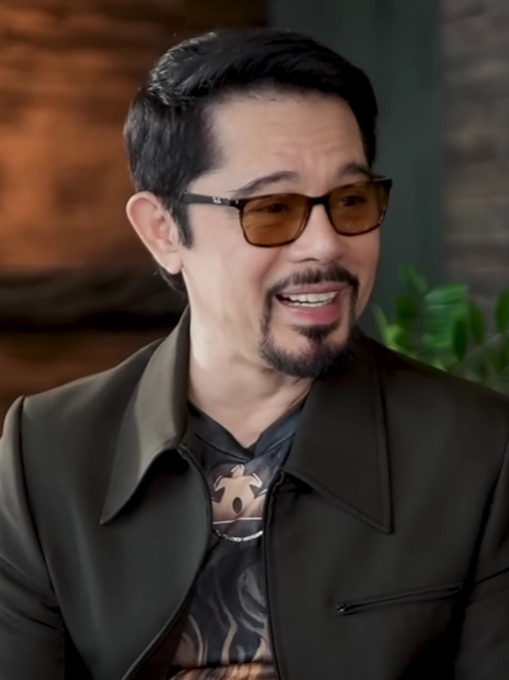
Christopher de Leon (pictured in 2023) was cast as Junior, which served as his first foray into acting.
- Christopher de Leon as "Junior" Blanco: A young man who later met the two outcasts
- Mario O'Hara as Bertong Ketong: The man who has leprosy
- Lolita Rodriguez as Kuala: A deranged woman
- Eddie Garcia as Cesar Blanco: Junior's father who is running for mayor.
- Lilia Dizon as Carolina Blanco: Junior's mother
- Hilda Koronel as Evangeline Ortega
- Laurice Guillen as Milagros
- Orlando Nadres as Mr. Del Mundo: A teacher
- Ernie Zarate as Dr. Ambrosio Ortega: The town's resident doctor and Evangeline's father
- Anita Linda as Honor Ortega: Evangeline's mother
- Alicia Alonzo as Cesar's mistress
- Lily Miraflor as Trinidad
- Joonee Gamboa as Eddie's father
- Lorli Villanueva as Chayong
- Rosa Aguirre as Lola Jacoba: Milagros' grandmother
- Mely Mallari
- Estrella Kuenzler
- Bey Vito as Eddie
- Joseph Sytangco as Nitoy: Junior's friend who was studying in Manila
- Jerry O'Hara as Joel
- Nina Lorenzo as Gracia
- Lily Gamboa as Evangeline's classmate
- Chito Ponce Enrile as Domeng

== Production ==
=== Filming ===
With the story being set in Nueva Ecija, the film was entirely shot in the town of Santa Rita, Pampanga, particularly the Villa Epifania house, Santa Rita College, and the Santa Rita de Casia Parish Church.

== Reception ==
=== Accolades ===
Award-giving organization	Date of ceremony	Category	Recipient(s)	Result	Ref.
23rd FAMAS Awards	17 May 1975	Best Picture	Weighed But Not Found Wanting	Won	
23rd FAMAS Awards	17 May 1975	Best Actor	Christopher de Leon	Won	
23rd FAMAS Awards	17 May 1975	Best Actress	Lolita Rodriguez	Won	
23rd FAMAS Awards	17 May 1975	Best Supporting Actor	Mario O'Hara	Nominated	
23rd FAMAS Awards	17 May 1975	Best Supporting Actress	Laurice Guillen	Nominated	
23rd FAMAS Awards	17 May 1975	Best Director	Lino Brocka	Won	
23rd FAMAS Awards	17 May 1975	Best Musical Score	Lutgardo Labad	Won	
23rd FAMAS Awards	17 May 1975	Best Theme Song	Awit ni Kuala; Written by Emmanuel Lacaba	Won	

== Restoration ==
The 4K restoration of the film was made possible by the Film Development Council of the Philippines, Carlotta Films, and Janus Films through the facilities of L'Immagine Ritrovata in Italy. While the original negatives are currently preserved at the BFI National Archive, which handled the scanning, reels 1 and 6 were discovered missing during the inspection in England. The composite source for the restoration was developed using an internegative copy of reel 1, which was produced in 1997 and is in a perfect state, and a positive print of reel 6, which is from 1976 and is in original-language audio without subtitles. However, it showed faded color and the usual theatrical damage from projection.

The restored 4K version of the film premiered on 23 June 2026 at the 40th Il Cinema Ritrovato in Italy. A Philippine premiere of the restored film was held on 4 September 2026 at Shangri-La Plaza.
