= Magkaibigan =

2008 Philippine drama film

- Directed by: Jose Javier Reyes
- Written by: Jose Javier Reyes
- Produced by: Jose Pimentel Ejercito Jr.
- Starring: Christopher de Leon; Jinggoy Estrada; Maricel Laxa; Dawn Zulueta
- Cinematography: Rodolfo Aves Jr.
- Edited by: Vito Cajili
- Music by: Jesse Lucas
- Production company: Maverick Films
- Distributed by: Maverick Films
- Release date: December 25, 2008
- Running time: 105 minutes
- Country: Philippines
- Languages: Filipino; English

Magkaibigan (transl. Friends) is a 2008 Philippine drama film written and directed by Jose Javier Reyes. The film stars Christopher de Leon, Jinggoy Estrada, Maricel Laxa and Dawn Zulueta. This is Maverick Films' last feature film for the decade.

It was one of the entries in the 2008 Metro Manila Film Festival, where it won Best Actor award. The movie is inspired by the story of actor Rudy Fernandez to whom the movie is dedicated to him.

== Plot ==
Ruben and Atoy are best friends since childhood. Even as they reached adulthood and married, their friendship remained strong, even their wives Eden and Tere. However, Ruben is struggling with his job and is thinking of resigning. This would lead him to becoming hot-headed especially when he would get rejected in applying for a new job. Luckily, Atoy would always help him, until he got an interview for a telecommunications company. Ruben would also look after Atoy's family when the latter went to the United States.

But as time goes by, Atoy started to feel very sickly. He decided to undergo check-up, and it found out that he was diagnosed with pancreatic cancer, and was given three months to live. He told to Ruben about it then to Tere. As Atoy is undergoing treatment, Ruben would be there to help his friend. Atoy responded very well with the treatment. He also told Ruben to settle all of his properties. But, Ruben became furious when he found out that Ruben's cancer metastasied. Atoy's health gradually deteriorating and is on a brink of death. As he was about to give up, he told Ruben to buy him a coffin, and arrange everything from his wake up to his burial. He also told Tere that when the time comes, she and their children should not be at his bedside. As Tere, Eden and their children are about to have lunch, Ruben was the only one left. Atoy's last wish to him is to take care of his family. As Ruben is reminiscing all of their happy memories, Atoy died. Ruben visit his friend's grave along with his sons.

== Cast ==
- Jinggoy Estrada as Ruben Bautista
- Christopher de Leon as Atoy Valenzuela
- Maricel Laxa as Eden Bautista
- Dawn Zulueta as Tere Valenzuela
- Ryan Julio as Benjie
- AJ Perez as Joni
- Justine Plummer as Dodie
- Bobby Andrews as Lito
- Tirso Cruz III as Noni
- Malou O'Connor as Elvie
- Kathy Mori as Yolly
- Empress Schuck as Katrina
- Boots Abalantac as Nita
- Millet Alcoran as Aileen
- Jhoana Marie Tan as Mavic
- Marvin Kiefer as David
- Bianca Aguila as Mayen
- Benjie Cayetano as Mr. Cabredo
- Alchris Galura as lger
- Harold Oide as Carlo
- Jana Roxas as Maya
- April Sun as Maya's Friend
- Raquel Villavicencio as Dr. Marcelo
- Mikko Agoncillo as Nurse
- Lui Manansala as Dr. Protacio
- Lai Tejuco as Yolly
- Cliff Riego de Dios as Fr. Perez

== Awards ==
Year	Awards	Category	Recipient	Result	Ref.
2008	34th Metro Manila Film Festival	Best Actor	Christopher de Leon	Won	
2009	57th FAMAS Awards	Best Actor	Christopher de Leon	Won	
