= Nora Aunor =

Filipino actress and singer (1953–2025)

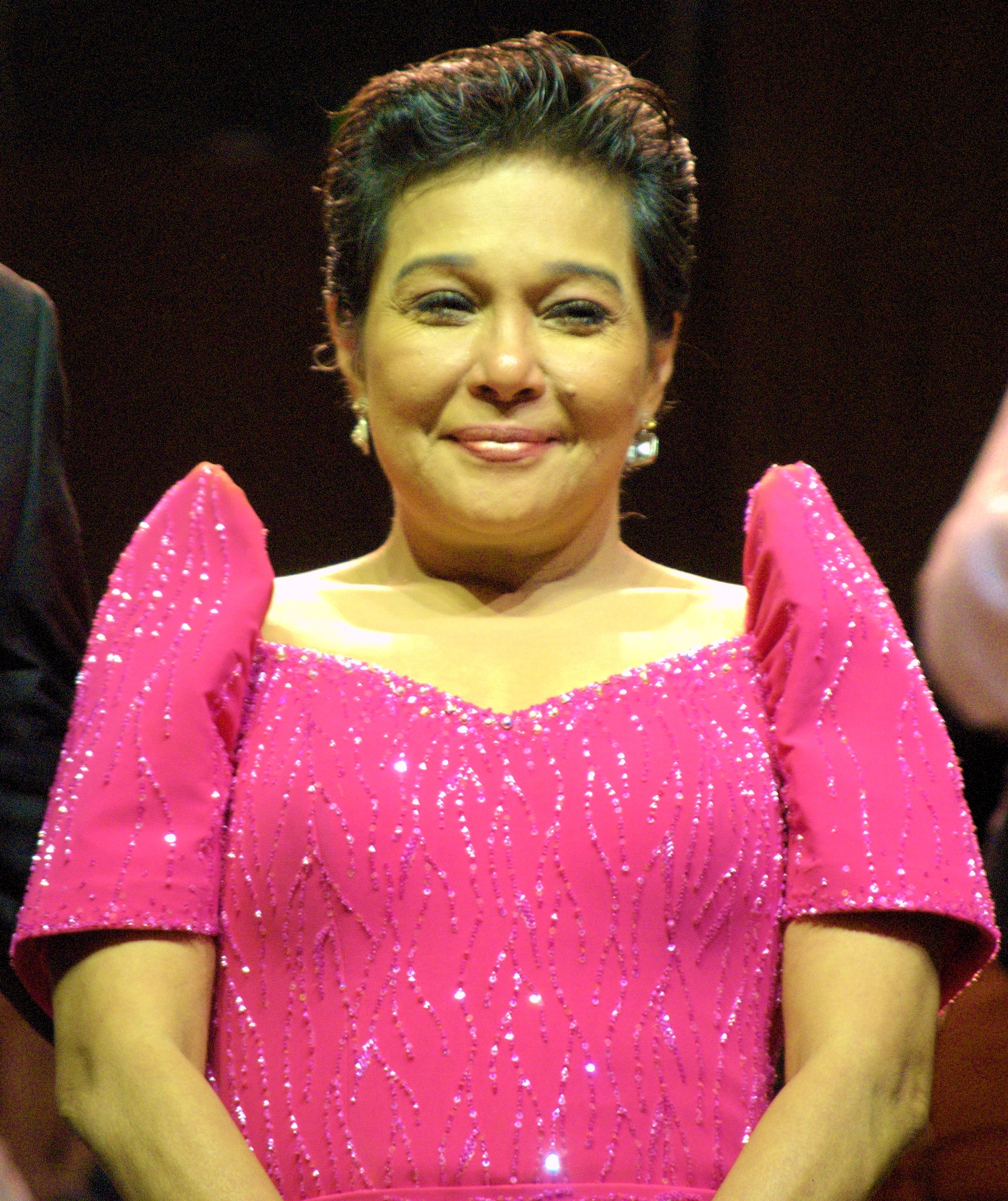
- Aunor in 2012
- Born: Nora Cabaltera Villamayor; May 21, 1953; Iriga, Camarines Sur, Philippines
- Died: April 16, 2025 (aged 71); Pasig, Metro Manila, Philippines
- Burial place: Libingan ng mga Bayani, Taguig, Metro Manila, Philippines
- Other name: Ate Guy
- Occupations: Actress; singer; film producer
- Years active: 1967–2025
- Works: Filmography; discography
- Political party: Peoples Champ Guardians Partylist (2025)
- Other political affiliations: Lakas (2001)
- Spouses: Christopher de Leon (m. 1975; ann. 1996) Richard Merk (m. 1988, separated)
- Children: 5, including Lotlot and Matet
- Relatives: Janine Gutierrez (granddaughter); Diego Gutierrez (grandson)
- Awards: Full list

Nora Cabaltera Villamayor (May 21, 1953 – April 16, 2025), known professionally as Nora Aunor, was a Filipino actress, producer, and singer. Known for her leading roles with patriotic, feminist and socio-political themes, she appeared in more than 170 motion pictures during a career that spanned over five decades. Regarded as the most awarded Filipino actress in history, she was known as the Philippines' "Superstar" and was conferred as a National Artist of the Philippines for Film and Broadcast Arts in 2022.

Aunor started her career as a singer, after winning a local talent search. She rose to fame in the following years as both a singer and actress. After her film debut in All Over the World (1967), she transitioned into drama, with highly acclaimed performances in films such as Tatlong Taong Walang Diyos (Three Years Without God) (1976), Minsa'y Isang Gamu-gamo (Once a Moth) (1976), Ina Ka ng Anak Mo (You Are Your Daughter's Mother) (1979), Himala (Miracle) (1982), Bulaklak sa City Jail (Flowers of the City Jail) (1984), and Bona (1980). Her performances in The Flor Contemplacion Story (1995), Bakit May Kahapon Pa? (1996), Thy Womb (2012), and Dementia (2014) brought her further international recognition and numerous international awards and nominations.

Aunor received 17 FAMAS Award nominations and was a "Hall of Fame" inductee, winning five Best Actress Awards. She is the most nominated actress in the history of the Gawad Urian Awards, with 21 nominations, winning seven, and the only performer to be chosen as one of Gawad Urian's Best Actors and Actresses of the Decade in three different decades (1980s, 1990s, and 2010s). She is the first and only Filipino to win the Asian Film Award for Best Actress. She won nine trophies from PMPC Star Awards for her work in film and television, eight Metro Manila Film Festival Awards, four Luna Awards, five Young Critics Circle Awards, a Cairo International Film Festival award, an Asia Pacific Screen Award, and an Asian Film Award. The Hollywood Reporter called her "The Grand Dame of Philippine Cinema" for her performances in Taklub (Trap) and Hustisya (Justice).

== Early life and background ==
Nora Cabaltera Villamayor was born on May 21, 1953 in Barrio San Francisco, Iriga, Camarines Sur, to Antonia Cabaltera and Eustacio Villamayor. She has nine siblings, including Eddie Villamayor, who was also an actor. Aunor's grandmother Theresa taught her to sing; the first song she learned was "The Way of a Clown". Her aunt Belén Aunor taught her diction, interpretation, and expression while singing, and gave her screen name.

Aunor grew up in poverty, selling peanuts on buses and cold water in front of the Bicol Express Train Station to make ends meet. She became a champion at the Darigold Jamboree radio singing contest, singing her winning piece "You and the Night and the Music". After that, she won in another radio singing contest, The Liberty Big Show. She entered the national singing contest, Tawag ng Tanghalan, was defeated on her first try, but became champion on her second attempt on May 29, 1967, when she sang "Moonlight Becomes You".

Aunor went to Mabini Memorial College for first grade, and transferred to Nichols Air Base Elementary School on reaching second grade. She finished high school at Generosa de Leon Memorial College in Parañaque, an affiliate of Centro Escolar University.

== Career ==
=== 1960s ===
"Moonlight Becomes You" (1967)
"Moonlight Becomes You"

After winning Tawag ng Tanghalan in 1967, Aunor made her first appearance as a guest at Timi Yuro's Araneta Coliseum concert. She made her first TV appearance as a guest on An Evening with Pilita, hosted by Pilita Corrales, and Carmen on Camera, hosted by Carmen Soriano.

On October 2, 1967, Aunor signed an eight-picture non-exclusive contract with Sampaguita Pictures, with the assurance that she would be given a singing part. Aunor made several youth-oriented films, including All Over The World and Way Out of the Country. From September to December 1967, she had supporting and minor roles in six films. Meanwhile, she made several singles, including "Moonlight Becomes You" and "There's Just Forever" for Citation Records and "No Return, No Exchange" and "You Are My First Love" for Jasper Recording.

By 1969, she appeared in films such as 9 Teeners and Young Girl, where she teamed up for the first time with Tirso Cruz III. That year her contract with Sampaguita Pictures expired and she made films with other studios, including Banda 24 and Drakulita for Barangay, Oh Delilah, Karate Showdown, Pabandying-Bandying, and Adriana.

Tower Records gave Aunor her first starring role opposite Cruz, the D' Musical Teenage Idols by Tower Productions, directed by Artemio Marquez and released on September 23, 1969. On September 26, Sampaguita Pictures released its 34th-anniversary presentation, Fiesta Extravaganza.

Superstar, Aunor's musical variety show, began airing in 1967, and eventually became the longest-running musical variety show on Philippine prime-time TV, airing for 22 years. During Aunor's coronation as the muse of Sampaguita Family Club, Tirso gave her a doll, "Maria Leonora Theresa", which reportedly became the most popular doll in Philippine showbiz history.

=== 1970s ===
Aunor continued to make teeny-bopper films alongside Tirso Cruz III. Together they were known as Guy and Pip from their most successful film, Guy and Pip. The film stayed in cinemas for six months, and was the top grosser at the 1971 Manila Film Festival.

Aunor evolved from a teen idol to a dramatic actress when she received her first Best Actress award in 1972 for And God Smiled at Me at the Quezon City Film Festival. She was first nominated for best actress by FAMAS (Filipino Academy for Movies, Arts and Sciences) for A Gift of Love. Aunor was nominated 17 times by FAMAS for best actress and won five times, and was nominated 21 times by Gawad Urian, with seven wins.

In 1973, Aunor established her own film production company, NV Productions, and produced its first film, Carmela. She was nominated in the 1974 FAMAS Awards for Paru-parung Itim (The Black Butterfly). She made Fe, Esperanza, Caridad (1974), a critically acclaimed film with three directors: Cirio H. Santiago and two National Artists for film, Gerardo de León and Lamberto V. Avellana. The film earned Aunor her third nomination at the 1975 FAMAS Awards.

She also produced and starred in the hit film Banaue: Stairway to the Sky (1975) directed by national artist Gerardo de León. She played a courageous Ifugao chieftain's daughter defending her tribe from nefarious outside forces. For this performance, Aunor received her fourth Best Actress nomination at the 1976 FAMAS Awards.

In 1976, Aunor produced the film Alkitrang Dugo (Blood of Tar) through NV Productions. It is based on Sir William Golding's novel Lord of the Flies. She continued to produce and act in films such as the period drama Tatlong Taong Walang Diyos (Three Years Without God), in which she played the schoolteacher Rosario, who experiences the atrocities of World War II. Her performance won her the first best actress award given by the Manunuri ng Pelikulang Pilipino (Gawad Urian Award) and her first Best Actress Award from FAMAS. Critics and audiences regard Tatlong Taong Walang Diyos as one of the best Filipino films ever made.

Before the year ended, Aunor starred in the groundbreaking Minsa'y Isang Gamu-gamo (Once There Was a Firefly) (1976), playing a would-be migrant to the United States whose brother is shot by a US soldier on the eve of her departure. Knowing that President Ferdinand Marcos's administration would not allow the public showing of any films criticizing the US presence in the Philippines, the producers tapped Aunor to star in the film, believing she had the support of Marcos and First Lady Imelda Marcos. The film, from Premiere Productions, won two awards at the 1976 Metro Manila Film Festival, and it also won Best Picture, Director (for Lupita Aquino-Kashiwahara), Screenplay, Story, and Editing at the 1977 FAMAS Awards. For Aunor's performance and the film's message, Minsa'y Isang Gamu-gamo is considered a classic Filipino film.

In 1977, Aunor starred with Fernando Poe Jr. in the romantic-comedy film Little Christmas Tree. On December 25, 1977, her film Bakya Mo, Neneng (Your Wooden Clogs, Neneng) was JE Productions' official entry in the 1977 Metro Manila Film Festival. She was paired with Joseph Estrada, who later became president of the Philippines.

At the 1978 FAMAS Awards, Aunor received her sixth nomination, for Bakya Mo Neneng, and won the FAMAS Award for Best Picture. She also appeared in Ikaw Ay Akin (You are Mine), directed by Ishmael Bernal. This film gave Aunor her second nomination from Gawad Urian for Best Actress.

Later that year, her film Atsay (Maid) was an official entry in the 1978 Metro Manila Film Festival. It was one of the two best entries at the festival, along with Rubia Servios, directed by Lino Brocka. Atsay was the only film to have won Best Performer in Metro Manila Film Festival history. That year, the organizers decided to give just one citation for performers—no best actor or actress or supporting actor or actress award, just the Best Performer Award.

Aunor won Best Performer for Atsay. Amy Austria, who played a supporting role in the film, was also nominated for Best Performer. The festival organizers wanted to adopt a sense of gender sensitivity by giving out a gender-neutral award. The award was scrapped the next year. Atsay also won Best Picture, Romeo Vitug for Best Cinematography and Eddie Garcia for Best Director at the Film Festival Awards. Aunor was nominated for the seventh time at the 1979 FAMAS Awards.

At the 1979 Metro Manila Film Festival, she had two films, Kasal-kasalan, Bahay-bahayan and Ina Ka ng Anak Mo. Both Aunor and Lolita Rodriguez won Best Actress for Ina Ka ng Anak Mo, Lino Brocka won Best Director, Raoul Aragon Best Actor, and the film won Best Picture. Aunor was also nominated for the Gawad Urian for Best Actress and won at the 1980 FAMAS Awards for her role. This was Aunor's second FAMAS Best Actress Award.

=== 1980s ===
"Moon River" (1985)
Aunor's live rendition of the Academy Award–winning song "Moon River"

In the 1980s Aunor's first film was Nakaw Na Pag-ibig (Stolen Love), another collaboration with Lino Brocka, together with Hilda Koronel and Phillip Salvador. That same year, Aunor made another film with Mario O'Hara, Kastilyong Buhangin (Sandcastle), with Lito Lapid as her leading man. Before 1980 ended, two of Aunor's films were official entries at the 1980 Metro Manila Film Festival. In Kung Ako'y Iiwan Mo, directed by Laurice Guillen, she played Beatrice Alcala, a singing superstar. The film won Best Sound and Cinematography at the Festival.

Aunor'a other entry was Bona, a film she produced and Brocka directed. At the festival, three women were nominated for Best Actress: Aunor for Bona and Kung Akoý Iiwan Mo (If You Leave Me), Amy Austria for Brutal, and Gina Alajar for Brutal. Aunor won her second Gawad Urian Best Actress for Bona, tying with Alajar; Aunor won her ninth Best Actress nomination from the 1981 FAMAS Awards for the same film. Bona screened at the Directors' Fortnight at the 1981 Cannes Film Festival, and decades later a restored version screened as part of the Cannes Classics at the 2024 Cannes Film Festival.

In 1981, Aunor made six films: Brocka's Dalaga si Misis, Binata si Mister, O'Hara's Gaano Kita Kamahal, and three films by Maryo de los Reyes—Totoo Ba ang Tsismis, Ibalik ang Swerti, and Rock N Roll. Rock N Roll was an entry in the 1981 Metro Manila Film Festival. Aunor made another film with O'Hara that year, Bakit Bughaw ang Langit? (Why Is the Sky Blue?), for which she received her 10th FAMAS Best Actress nomination and fifth nomination from Gawad Urian. She won the Best Actress award from the Catholic Mass Media Awards. No print of this film is known to exist.

Aunor continued to make romantic comedy films in 1982, such as Annie Sabungera (Annie the Woman Cockfighter) and Palengke Queen. The same year, she also appeared in three other films. Mga Uod at Rosas (Worms and Roses) tells the story of a painter whose work affected his relationship with his wife and his model mistress. This film earned Aunor her 11th nomination from FAMAS. In T-Bird at Ako (T-Bird and Me), Aunor plays a lesbian lawyer who falls for a woman she is defending in court.

Her third drama performance for 1982 was in Himala (Miracle), in which she plays a young woman who claims to have seen the Virgin Mary. Produced by the Experimental Cinema of the Philippines, the film won Best Picture, Best Actress for Aunor, Best Director for Ishmael Bernal, and six other awards in the 1982 Metro Manila Film Festival. It was the first Filipino film to screen in the "Competition Section" of the Berlin International Film Festival and received the Bronze Hugo Award at the 19th Chicago Film Festival (1983), the Asia-Pacific Film Festival Special Achievement award for Best Depiction of Socially Involved Religion (1983), and the Best Asian-Pacific Movie of All Time, CNN APSA Viewers Choice Award (2008). 30 years after its release, a restored version of the film was shown in the "Venice Classics" section at the 69th Venice International Film Festival. In 2019 Himala was made into a stage musical.

In 1983, Aunor made a single film, Minsan, May Isang Ina, with Charito Solis and Maricel Soriano, and directed by Maryo J. de los Reyes. For this she received her 12th consecutive FAMAS Best Actress nomination.

In 1984, Aunor released three films. In 'Merika, she portrayed an Overseas Filipino Worker who works as a nurse in America and struggles to fight loneliness and homesickness. The film is about Filipino illegal aliens who will do anything just to get a Green card. Directed by Gil Portes, Aunor's performance in this film won her awards from (PMPC) Star Awards for Movies and her eighth Gawad Urian best actress nomination. Condemned is a story of siblings Yolly (Aunor) and Efren (Dan Alvaro), and how their lives changed when Efren worked as a driver and a hired killer for ruthless money laundering lady Connie (played by Gloria Romero). The film was given an "A" Rating by the Film Ratings Board. Bulaklak sa City Jail (Flowers of the City Jail) was an official entry to the 1984 Metro Manila Film Festival, won best actress from Metro Manila Film Festival for her role as a pregnant prisoner and a victim of injustice, Angela Aguilar. It also won Catholic Mass Media Awards and her third best actress award from FAMAS. At the Gawad Urian that year, Aunor was a double nominee for Best Actress for Bulaklak sa City Jail and Merika, while at the PMPC Star Awards for Movies, Aunor was a triple nominee for Best Actress for Merika, Condemned, and Bulaklak sa City Jail. She was also nominated for Best Actress at the Film Academy of the Philippines for Bulaklak sa City Jail.

In 1985, Aunor made five films. The first was Beloved, a film about four people torn between the love of power and the power of love and infidelity. The film was also serialized in King Komiks. Next was Tinik sa Dibdib as Lorna, a long-suffering daughter of irresponsible parents who drove her to marry a security guard, who himself is the breadwinner of a very dysfunctional family. Her next film was Till We Meet Again. This was followed by an anthology film Mga Kwento ni Lola Basyang, and finally, I Can't Stop Loving You, an entry to the 1985 Metro Manila Film Festival.

For the next three years, released only a handful including her final team-up with Dolphy, My Bugoy Goes to Congress. Other films included 1986's I Love You Mama, I Love You Papa, in which she received her 15th consecutive FAMAS Best Actress nomination; Sana Mahalin Mo Ako; Tatlong Ina, Isang Anak (Three Mothers, One Son); and Balut...Penoy.

In 1989 she filmed Bilangin ang mga Bituin sa Langit (Count the Stars in the Sky), about the rise and fall of a poor, hard-working, and determined barrio lass and her lifetime stormy relationship with a childhood sweetheart. For this film, she won the Best Actress Awards in Gawad Urian, FAMAS, and FAP. On October 1, 1989, after 22 years, her musical-variety show Superstar aired its final episode. The program briefly returned on television from November 1989 when it was produced on Channel 13.

=== 1990s ===
Nora Aunor has now defined for us the meaning of a true triumph of the spirit.
No wonder she is much imitated but never equalled.
— former Philippine Senate President Blas Ople, on Aunor in 1996.

In the 1990s Aunor made 10 films. Most of these films were critically acclaimed and won domestic and international awards. Aunor also did three stage plays, two of them produced by the Philippine Educational Theater Association (PETA).

In the 1990 film Andrea, Paano Ba ang Maging Isang Ina? (Andrea, What is it Like to Be a Mother?), Aunor played a New People's Army rebel who leaves her newborn baby to search for her husband. The film won for Aunor all the Best Actress Awards given by the Philippines' five annual award-giving bodies at that time: Gawad Urian, Star Awards for Movies, Film Academy of the Philippines, and her fifth FAMAS Award for Best Actress, thus elevating her to the Hall of Fame. She won the first Young Critics Circle Award for Best Performance. The film was also the official entry to the 1990 Metro Manila Film Festival, where she also won the Best Actress award.

On May 18, 1991, a few days before her 38th birthday, she staged her first major concert at the Araneta Coliseum, thus earning the name "concert queen" for filling the venue with about 30,000 fans. Her guests included Gary Valenciano, Mon Faustino, The Hotlegs, The Operas, and many more. The audio recording of the concert was later released as her first live album Handog ni Guy Live.

Later in 1991, Aunor ventured into theater and did the stage adaptation of her critically acclaimed film, Minsa'y Isang Gamu-gamo. It was staged by PETA and directed by Socrates "Soxy" Topacio, then PETA's artistic head, and penned by Rody Vera. She did two more stage plays, DH in 1992 and The Trojan Women in 1994. Her performances in the three plays were acclaimed.

On December 25, 1991, Ang Totoong Buhay ni Pacita M. was included in the 1991 Metro Manila Film Festival. Aunor played a mother struggling to take care of her vegetative daughter. Aunor won numerous awards for her performance, including the Metro Manila Film Festival Best Actress and her third consecutive Best Actress trophy from the Film Academy of the Philippines. She also won at the Star Awards for Movies and from the Young Critics Circle Award for Best Performance.

In 1992, Aunor was cast in another PETA play, DH. PETA toured the play in North America, Europe, and Hong Kong. On the same year, Aunor returned to television through the weekly drama anthology, Star Drama Presents NORA. She won the Best Actress Award from Star Awards for Television (Philippine Movie Press Club). In 1994, she won the Best Actress in a Single Performance award from the Star Awards for Television (Philippine Movie Press Club) for her performance in "Spotlight" for the episode: "Good Morning, Ma'am". She went back into the recording studio to record bonus tracks for a compilation album to be released in co-operation with Alpha Records and Warner Brothers. The new songs were written by an American songwriter, a neighbor of her sister Tita in San Diego, California.

In 1994, Aunor received the Lifetime Achievement Award from the Film Academy of the Philippines. She was the youngest recipient of this special award. In 1995, Aunor found renewed success in the box office when she starred in the biographical film The Flor Contemplacion Story, about Filipino domestic worker Flor Contemplacion who was hanged in Singapore for allegedly killing her fellow maid. Her performance in The Flor Contemplacion Story got rave reviews earning her first international best actress awards from Cairo International Film Festival, she swept all the Best-Actress awards given by the Philippines' different award-giving bodies, including the Best Performance by Male or Female, Adult or Child, and Individual or Ensemble in Leading or Supporting Role given by the Young Critics Circle Award for Best Performance.

Aunor's other 1995 film was Viva Films' official entry to the 1995 Metro Manila Film Festival, Muling Umawit ang Puso, featuring her as a once-famous actress seeking to regain her popularity. It won several awards at the festival including Best Picture, Director, and Actress.

In June 1996, Aunor was cast to play Sisa in Premiere Productions' then-upcoming film adaptation of José Rizal's novel Noli Me Tángere, though the project did not come to fruition. In 1997, Aunor won her second international Best Actress trophy from the 1st East Asia Film and Television Awards and her sixth Urian Best Actress Award for her role as a psychotic woman who plots her revenge on the family of her parents' killer in Bakit May Kahapon Pa?.

In 1999, Aunor made only one film, Sidhi, written by Rolando Tinio, a National Artist for Theater and Literature. Later that year, Aunor received the Centennial Honors for the Arts from the Cultural Center of the Philippines, conferred to Filipinos who have made significant contributions to culture and the arts in the 20th century.

=== 2000s ===
In 2002, Aunor returned to Philippine television through her nightly drama show entitled, Bituin, a soap opera that was aired by ABS-CBN from September 23, 2002, to May 23, 2003. It starred Carol Banawa, Desiree del Valle, Aunor and Cherie Gil.

In 2003, Aunor held her 50th birthday Gold sell-out concert at the Araneta Coliseum.

In 2004, Aunor made Naglalayag, her last film shot entirely in the Philippines before she went on hiatus for almost eight years. Aunor played a middle-aged judge having an affair with a young taxi driver, portrayed by Yul Servo. Their performance won them international acting awards at the 31st Festival International du Film Indépendant de Bruxelles, where the film also won the jury prize.

On December 1, 2005, Aunor received her own star on the Philippines Walk of Fame as one of its first inductees.

While in the United States, Aunor did two independently produced films namely Ingrata and Care Home. Even with only a limited run in a few Metro Manila theaters, the films, particularly Care Home, was still able to score for Aunor critical praise and even nominations for Best Actress, specifically from PMPC Star Awards for Movies in 2007.

=== 2010s ===
Aunor toured the United States and Canada performing to Filipino communities in a series of concerts at the start of the decade. In February 2010, she was shortlisted by the Green Globe Film Awards as one of the 10 Best Asian Actresses of the Decade. On March 23, 2010, Aunor was named one of the 10 Best Asian Actresses along with Gong Li and Maggie Cheung. She was the only Filipino actress to be shortlisted and win this award. Aunor also made two endorsement deals in Japan, including one for a skin clinic. However, due to a botched surgery in Japan, Aunor lost her singing voice, During her concert in May 2010 in Toronto, Canada, Aunor tearfully announced that it would be her last concert as she could no longer sing.

On August 2, 2011, Aunor returned to the Philippines. She signed a three-year contract with TV5 and was cast in the mini series Sa Ngalan ng Ina, where she played a widow who suddenly finds herself embracing the complexities of political life and government power. Aunor received a nomination from Golden Screen TV Awards and a best actress trophy from 2012 Star Awards for Television. This miniseries was her last collaboration with director Mario O'Hara before his death from leukemia. She also starred alongside ER Ejercito in the historical film El Presidente, a biopic of the first Philippine President Emilio Aguinaldo intended for the 2012 Metro Manila Film Festival, in which she played the role of Aguinaldo's second wife Maria Agoncillo. Also in 2011, she received eight Lifetime Achievement Awards for film and music from different award giving bodies.

In 2012, Aunor collaborated with the Cannes best director awardee Brillante Mendoza for the film Thy Womb which was part of the 69th Venice International Film Festival. Aunor played Shaleha, a barren Badjao midwife who helps her husband look for a wife who can bear a child. The film was nominated for Golden Lion for Best Film and Volpi Cup for best actress for Aunor. On the eve of the awards, Aunor was chosen by the "Premio Della Critica Indipendiente" as their best performer and gave her the Bisato d'Oro.

In November 2012, Aunor won the Asia Pacific Screen Award for Best Performance by an Actress and the film won the Asia Pacific Screen Award for Achievement in Directing for Brillante Mendoza. By virtue of her nomination from the Asia Pacific Screen Award, she became the first Filipino actor to be inducted as a member of Asia Pacific Screen Academy. She was also nominated at the 55th Asia Pacific Film Festival, Dubai International Film Festival, 43rd International Film Festival of India, and won Best Actress at the seventh Asian Film Awards.

At the 2012 Metro Manila Film Festival, Aunor won her eighth best actress award from the Festival.

Also in 2012, Aunor guested in the fantasy-drama TV series Enchanted Garden, as a faith healer who happens to be a queen. She guested in Third Eye. In 2013, she returned to TV in the soap opera, Never Say Goodbye and was also cast in Ang Kwento ni Mabuti an official entry to the first CineFilipino film Festival directed by acclaimed director Mes de Guzman.

On May 21, 2013, Aunor celebrated her 60th birthday dubbed as "Nora at 60" at the Meralco Multi-Purpose Hall.

It's great to win abroad but nothing beats being recognized by your countrymen.
— Aunor on her acceptance speech at the 2013 Gawad Urian.

I have won many awards, but each new one surprises me still.

— Nora Aunor on winning Gawad Tanglaw Best Actress.

On June 18, 2013, Aunor won the Gawad Urian Award for Best Actress for Thy Womb. This was her 17th nomination and her seventh win.

On August 30, 2013, Aunor won her fourth international Best Actress award from the third Sakhalin International Film Festival in Russia for the film Thy Womb.

In 2014, Aunor filmed her second tele-movie/miniseries with TV5 titled When I Fall in Love, and directed by Joel Lamangan. She portrayed a wife who takes care of her terminally-ill husband.

Aunor was honored as one of the "People of the Year" by People Asia magazine on January 21, 2014. In the promotional news of TV5, Aunor was announced to top-bill the musical-drama, Trenderas, in which Aunor played the role of a famous singer who mysteriously disappeared at the height of her popularity.

On February 2, 2014, Aunor received her second Ani ng Dangal Award from the National Commission for Culture and the Arts (Philippines).

On July 18, 2014, the University of the Philippines College of Mass Communication awarded Aunor with the Gawad Plaridel Award for Television, Music and Film.

Aunor made four films in 2014, including Hustisya, which was part of the 10th Cinemalaya Independent Film Festival. This was the first time that Aunor had participated in the Film festival. The film was directed by Joel Lamangan and written by Ricky Lee. Aunor won her first Best Actress award from this festival. The film was also declared by Cinemalaya as the box-office winner during its weeklong run.

The three other films were Dementia, a psychological horror drama directed by Perci Intalan. Padre de Pamilya and Whistleblower, were both directed by Adolfo Alix, Jr.

In 2012, Aunor received the Asian Achiever Award as Asia's Best Actress Awardee by the Asia Pacific Awards Council (APAC) led by consumer advocate Jonathan Navea. She again received the same accolade during the 26th Asia Pacific Excellence Awards on April 9, 2015.

On May 16, 2015, Aunor won her eighth International Best actress for Dementia which also won the Best Foreign Language Film at the St. Tropez International Film Festival in France. She also won the Lifetime Achievement Award at the 2015 ASEAN International Film Festival.

In 2015, Aunor was recognized by several universities and colleges in the Philippines, naming her as a cultural Icon. Bicol University presented her with the ONRA Award upon the initiative of Ako Bicol Partylist Representative Rodel Batocabe for bringing honor and pride to her fellow Bicolanos in particular, and to the country in general, through her achievements in the arts. The Ateneo de Naga University gave her "Bulawan na Bikolnon" award for giving pride to the Bicol Region. De La Salle University also recognized her with the "Gawada La Sallian para sa Sining" for her contributions to Philippine Arts.

On September 17, 2015, Aunor was conferred the Gawad CPP para sa Sining for Film and Broadcast Arts by the Cultural Center of the Philippines.

At the 63rd FAMAS Awards on September 20, 2015, Aunor was recognized as the Iconic Movie Queen of Philippine Cinema.

After consecutive nominations for Thy Womb, Ang Kwento ni Mabuti, Dementia, and Taklub, Aunor received her fifth consecutive and 21st Gawad Urian for Best Actress nomination in 2017 for Hinulid, her first film shot entirely in her native Bicolano language.

=== 2020s ===
Aunor's speech during the 2022 Order of the National Artist of the Philippines

In 2020, Aunor appeared in the film Isa Pang Bahaghari (Another Rainbow), with Phillip Salvador and Michael de Mesa, directed by Joel Lamangan. The film competed in the 2020 Metro Manila Film Festival.

In May 2020 on her 67th birthday, during the COVID-19 pandemic in the Philippines, Aunor appeared in the YouTube video Lola Doc.

In 2021, Aunor was chosen as one of the Best Actors and Actresses of the Decade (2010s) by the Manunuri ng Pelikulang Pilipino, the Filipino film critic group of the Gawad Urian Award.

In late 2021, Aunor was cast in her first antagonist role in the film Kontrabida (The Villain), directed by Adolfo Alix Jr. The film competed at the sixth Hanoi International Film Festival, winning the Network for the Promotion of Asia Pacific Cinema Prize for Best Asian Film.

In June 2022, Aunor received the National Artist of the Philippines award following Proclamation 1390 issued by President Rodrigo Duterte.

In 2023, Aunor starred in Pieta, a drama-thriller directed by Alix, with Alfred Vargas, Bembol Roco, Gina Alajar, and Jaclyn Jose. She portrayed a mother who is going blind and suffering from early-onset Alzheimer's who meets her son just released from prison after 25 years. For her performance, Aunor won the Best Actress award at the 40th PMPC Star Awards for Movies.

Aunor made a cameo appearance in the 2024 musical drama film and Metro Manila Film Festival entry Isang Himala, an adaptation of the 2018 theatrical play based on Aunor's 1982 film Himala. In February 2025, Aunor starred in her final film titled Mananambal, a horror film directed by Alix.

Before her death, Aunor was supposed to star in a film with Hilda Koronel.

On May 4, 2025, Aunor was posthumously conferred with the Presidential Medal of Merit from President Bongbong Marcos for her services to the arts.

== In politics ==
In 1986, Aunor campaigned for the reelection of President Ferdinand Marcos in the 1986 snap election, stating in her television program Superstar that she believed Marcos could solve the problems in Philippine society. Despite this, Aunor attended the beginning of the People Power Revolution that toppled Marcos a few weeks later.

Aunor publicly supported actor Joseph Estrada's successful candidacy in the 1998 Philippine presidential election but withdrew her support during the Second EDSA Revolution, in which she personally participated, in January 2001. Aunor had also accused Estrada of hitting her while they were both in a relationship in their acting careers. She endorsed Estrada's successor, Gloria Macapagal-Arroyo, in the 2004 election.

Aunor ran for governor of Camarines Sur, her home province, in 2001. Raul Roco said that she would be the Arroyo administration's candidate, with Aunor running under Aksyon Demokratiko, Roco's party. Roco had earlier asked Estrada to endorse Aunor for governor. She eventually ran under Lakas–NUCD of Arroyo, with Speaker Jose de Venecia Jr. saying that she withdrew support to Estrada after being convinced by Jose Maria Sison of the Communist Party of the Philippines.

Aunor went up against incumbent governor Luis Villafuerte. During the campaign, Aunor initially had the support of leftist party-list Bayan Muna, but then they withdrew their support due to differences in ideology and organizational style. At the same time, her house in Iriga, which she used as her campaign headquarters, was shot at by unidentified gunmen, forcing her to relocate. Villafuerte defeated Aunor in the election.

On March 17, 2015, Aunor publicly called for President Noynoy Aquino's resignation during a rally to commemorate the death of Flor Contemplacion, accusing him of failing to resolve labor issues in the country.

In 2024, Aunor registered her candidacy as second nominee of the People's Champ Guardians party-list for the 2025 Philippine House of Representatives elections. In March 2025 she withdrew her candidacy, and endorsed Kabalikat ng Mamamayan.

== Personal life ==
Aunor and actor Christopher de Leon married in a civil ceremony on January 25, 1975. She and De Leon have one biological child, Kristoffer Ian de Leon and four adopted children, including Lotlot de Leon and Matet de Leon. She and De Leon renewed their vows on January 27, 1976, in a religious ceremony. The couple later separated, and their marriage was dissolved in 1996. Her niece Marion Aunor is also a singer and actress.

Records from the Marriage Inquiry System of Clark County, Las Vegas indicates that Aunor married two individuals at different dates during her stay in the United States. These were previously not known to the public. On July 7, 1988, she married Richard Merk, a Filipino actor and jazz singer. Merk confirmed the marriage in an interview, stating that it lasted for three years until they separated, without the two of them filing for divorce. Another record indicated that Aunor married her female manager Norie Sayo on May 22, 2000. Despite the marriage entry, Sayo denied that there was a marriage between her and Aunor. She explained that at the time the supposed marriage occurred, same-sex marriage was only legal in the state of Massachusetts, and it is impossible for them to be wed in Las Vegas. She suspects that someone else applied for this marriage entry without the two of them knowing.

On March 30, 2005, Aunor was arrested at Los Angeles International Airport after being found with eight grams of methamphetamine and a glass pipe in her carry-on luggage. After pleading guilty to drug-related charges, she was ordered to pay a $250-fine and undergo a six-month drug rehabilitation program. Upon completion of the terms, the charges against her were dismissed in 2007. The case was cited by President Noynoy Aquino in his refusal to confer the National Artist Award to Aunor in 2014.

Aunor became a permanent resident of the United States in 2008. In 2011, she returned to the Philippines to resume her acting and singing career after an eight-year hiatus.

In an interview with Yes!, published in October 2011, in which Aunor was asked if she was bisexual, she replied that she may well be. Aunor recalled how some people assume she is a lesbian due to her masculine gender expression.

== Death and memorial ==
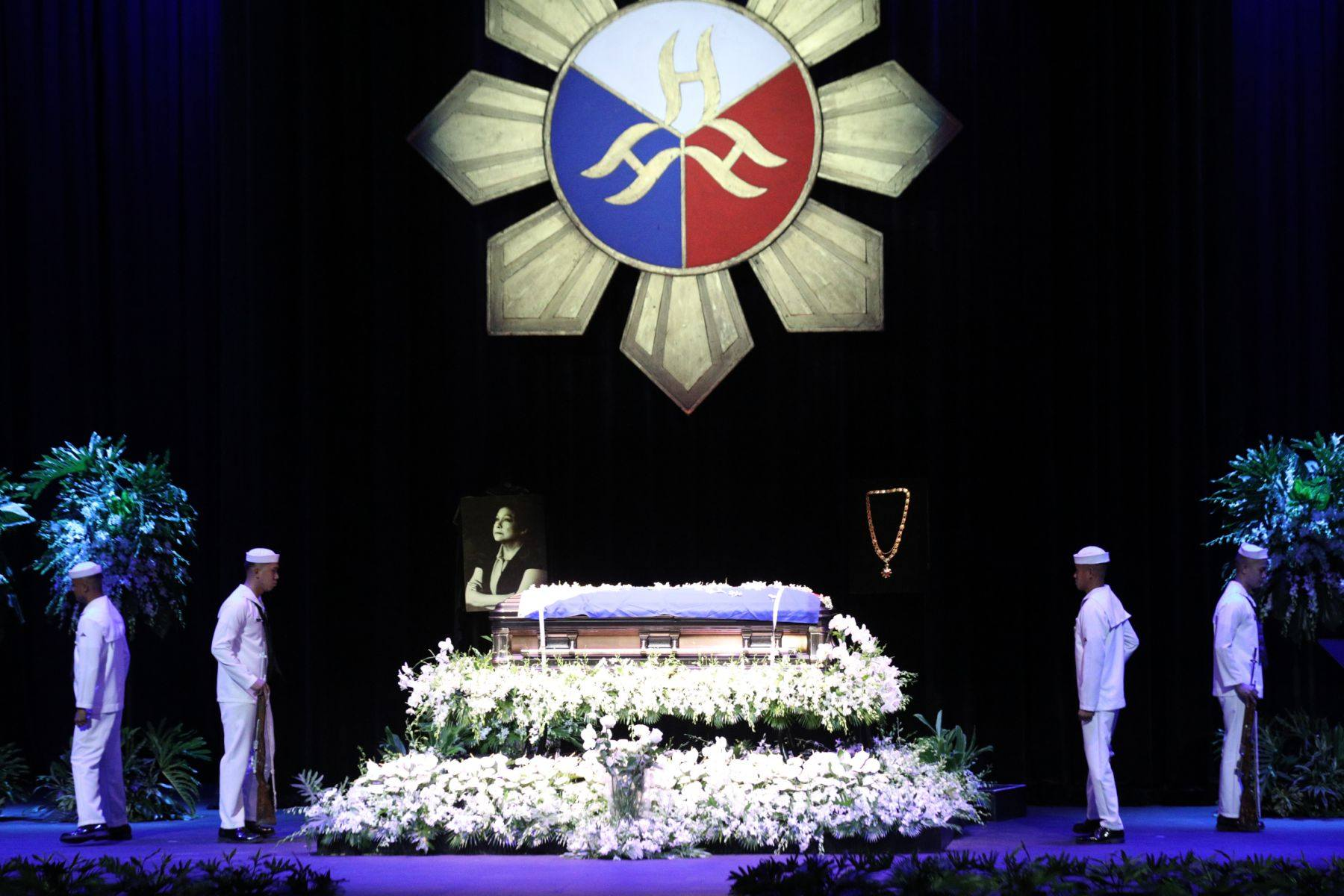
Aunor's state memorial service at the Manila Metropolitan Theater on April 22, 2025

Aunor died at The Medical City Ortigas in Pasig, on the night of April 16, 2025, aged 71. Aunor had been confined to the hospital since April 10 and died due to acute respiratory failure a day after going through an angioplasty. President Bongbong Marcos subsequently declared April 22, 2025, the date for her funeral, as a day of national mourning. She was accorded state memorial services at the Manila Metropolitan Theater on April 22, followed by a state funeral later that day at the Libingan ng mga Bayani, the heroes' cemetery of the Philippines. Aunor's death was significantly covered by international and global media, including the BBC, CNN, New York Times, LA Times, France24, NBC, and many others.

== Legacy ==
In 1983, Aunor was recognized as one of The Outstanding Women in the Nation's Service (TOWNS) in the Field of the Arts. In 1999, Aunor received the Centennial Honors for the Arts awarded by the Cultural Center of the Philippines (CCP). She was the only film actress included in the list of awardees. In 2010, she was hailed by the Green Planet Movie Awards as one of the "10 Asian Best Actresses of the Decade". She received the Ani ng Dangal Award (Harvest of Honors). from the National Commission for Culture and the Arts in 2013, 2014 and 2016. In 2013, she received the "Light of Culture Awards from Philippine Centre of the International Theatre Institute and the ITI-Earthsavers UNESCO Dream Center for pioneering in the integration of theater, television, and film. In 2014, Aunor was the recipient of the University of the Philippines College of Mass Communication's Gawad Plaridel Award. On September 17, 2015, Aunor was conferred the Gawad CCP para sa Sining for Film and Broadcast Arts, the highest award given by the Cultural Center of the Philippines. She was also conferred the Gusi Peace Prize in 2015.

In 2022, Aunor was conferred as National Artist of the Philippines for Film and Broadcast Arts.

In 2023, a new species of Begonia, B.noraaunorae was named after Aunor as an honor to her various achievements in the entertainment industry.

In May 2025, she was posthumously conferred the Presidential Medal of Merit alongside recently deceased Filipina personalities.

=== Film ===
From the late 1960s onwards, Aunor made a total of 170 films in different genres, from musicals, comedy, romantic comedy, romance and Love story. Later on, she made films in other genres such as drama, biographical, film noir, action, thriller, horror and arthouse films.

She received recognition for the outstanding box-office performances of her films. She won the Philippine Box Office Queen Award in the 1970s, 80s and 90s.

For being the consummate actor, Aunor received numerous national and international awards and nominations. She was the first Filipino actor to win an International acting award in a major Film Festival (Cairo 1995 for The Flor Contemplacion Story), along with several Best Actress awards from numerous international film festivals for Thy Womb, Dementia, Naglalayag, and Bakit May Kahapon Pa?. She was named Best Actress for Thy Womb at the Asian Film Awards and the Asia Pacific Screen Awards, and given the Lifetime Achievement Award in 2015 by the ASEAN International Film Festival and Awards.

She was directed by four Philippine National Artist Awardees: Gerardo de Leon (Fe, Esperanza, Caridad and Banaue: Stairway to the Sky), Lamberto Avellana (Fe, Esperanza, Caridad), Lino Brocka (Ina ka ng Anak Mo, Nakaw Na Pag-ibig, Bona), and Ishmael Bernal (Himala, Ikaw Ay Akin). She acted with two Philippine National Artist Awardees for Theater in films: Rolando Tinio (notably Bakit May Kahapon Pa?,Bilangin ang Bituin sa Langit), and Tony Mabesa (notably The Flor Contemplacion Story, Muling Umawit ang Puso). She also frequently collaborated with fellow National Artist Ricky Lee in Himala, Andrea, Paano Ba Ang Maging Isang Ina?, The Flor Contemplacion Story, Hustisya, and many others.

=== Music ===
Aunor released more than 360 singles and recorded over 200 songs and more than 50 albums. She had more than 30 gold singles, and with an estimated gross sales of one million units, her 1971 cover of "Pearly Shells" stands as one of the biggest-selling singles in Philippine music history. In 2010, while undergoing a cosmetic procedure in Japan as part of an endorsement for a clinic, she experienced complications that affected her vocal cords. As a result, she suffered paralysis of her left vocal cord, which impacted her ability to sing.

=== Television ===
Aunor started her career in television when she was given her own musical show via Nora-Eddie Show, with singer and former Tawag ng Tanghalan Champion Eddie Peregrina. The show later became, The Nora Aunor Show and eventually was re-titled Superstar. Nora Aunor also starred and produced, Ang Makulay na Daigdig ni Nora. A drama anthology under the direction of Ishmael Bernal, Mario O’Hara amongst others. Nora won 3 consecutive Best Actress awards for this show at PATAS awards in the 70’s.

=== Radio ===
Aunor was heard and guested in Fiesta Extravaganza and in the long running afternoon radio program of German Moreno (The Germiside Show where he had a Guy and Pip portion) and only songs of Aunor and Tirso Cruz were played over and over again from 2 to 3 pm every Sunday aired via DZMM.

=== Stage ===
Aunor performed in three plays: Minsa'y Isang Gamu-Gamo (1991), DH (Domestic Helper) in 1992, and The Trojan Women (1994). The first two were staged by the Philippine Educational Theater Association (PETA) and helmed by Socrates Topacio, then PETA's artistic head. Rody Vera penned the stage adaptation of Gamu-Gamo while renowned screenwriter Ricky Lee created DH. PETA toured both plays in North America, Europe, and Hong Kong. The third play, a Filipino adaptation of Euripides' immortal tragedy, was produced by Cecille Guidote-Alvarez's theater company, directed by a Greek national, and staged at the Ninoy Aquino Parks and Wildlife.

=== Product endorsements ===
At the peak of her career, Aunor was the top product endorser for television, print, and radio advertisements. The sales of Dial bath soap, for instance, shot up after Aunor endorsed it. Originally imported from the US, Dial soap first catered the upscale markets. When it was eventually manufactured locally, it courted the mass market by making Aunor its product endorser. Aunor appeared in a television commercial of Dial soap taking a shower and singing, "Aren't you glad you used Dial?". The television commercial proved successful as sales of Dial soap went up, and the masses, which comprise the bulk of her fans, patronized Dial soap.

Aunor endorsed many local and international brands.

== Awards and recognitions ==
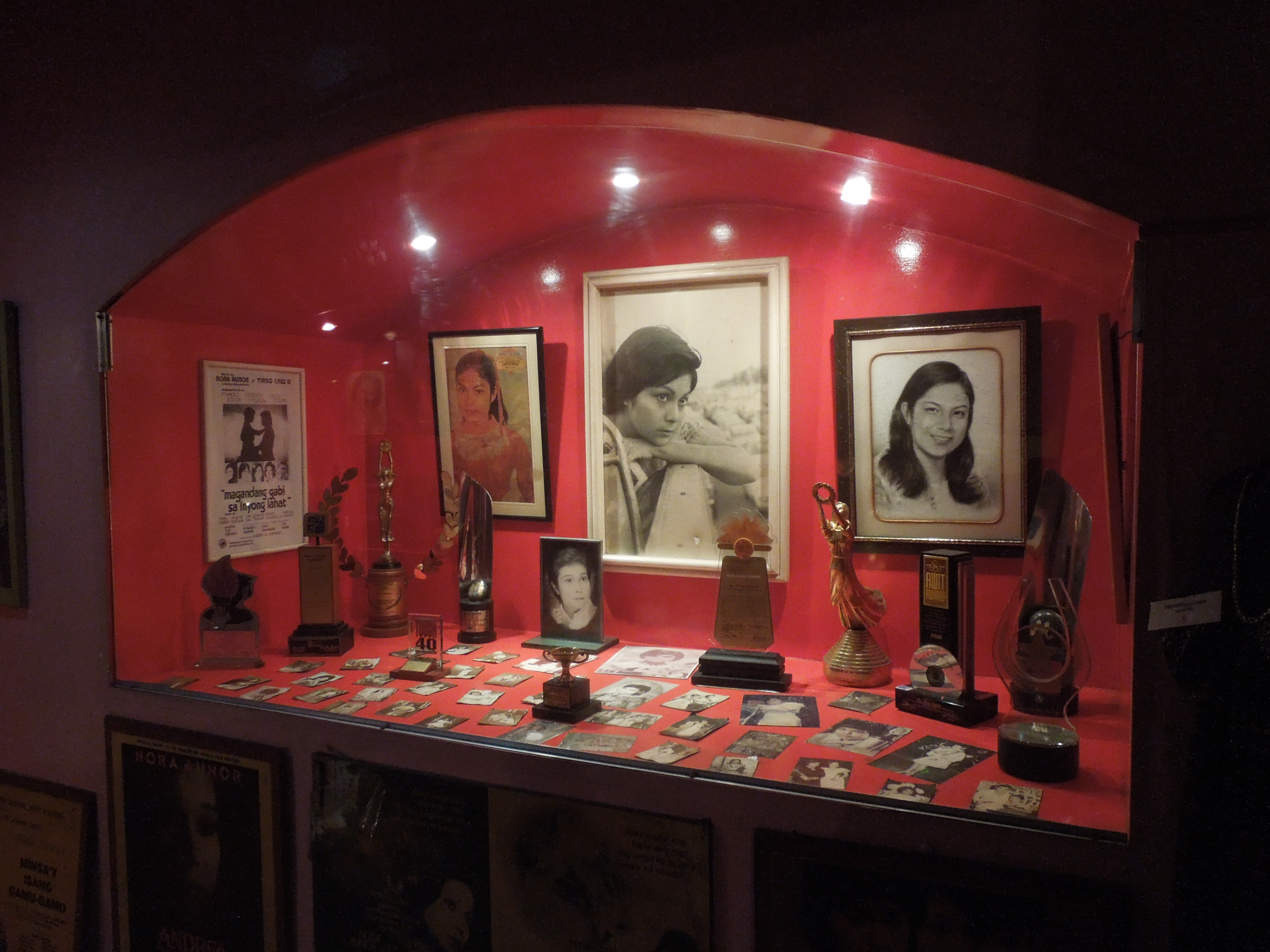
Some of Aunor's Acting Trophies displayed at Mowelfund Museum

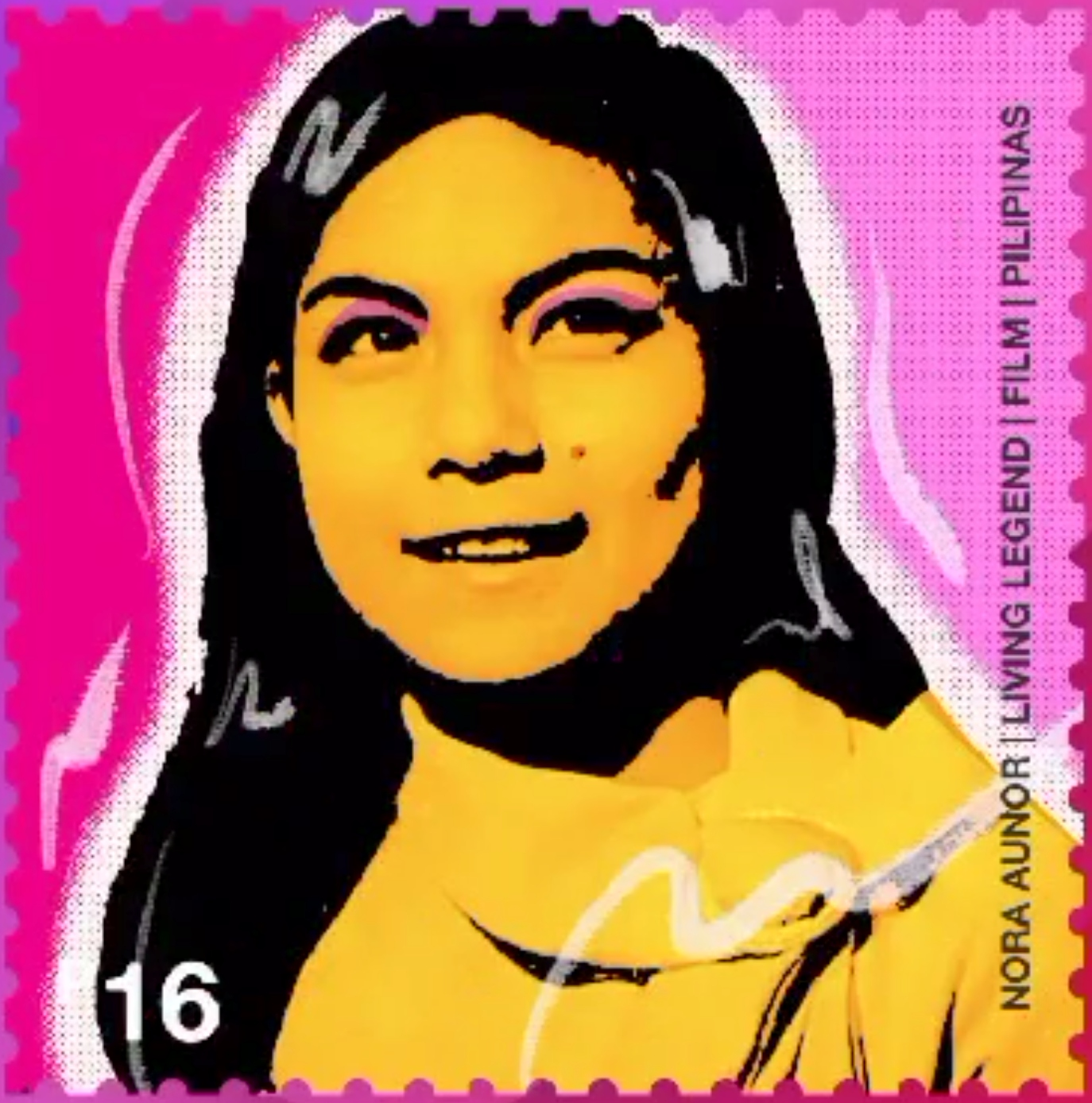
Aunor on a 2022 stamp of the Philippines

Aunor was awarded, recognized and received multiple nominations from different organizations, academe, institutions, critics and award giving bodies for her work in film, television, music and theater. She is the most nominated actress for the leading role in the long history of FAMAS Awards, having nominated 17 times since 1973 when she was first nominated for A Gift of Love but only second to Eddie Garcia with 23 nominations both in leading and supporting role.

With her fifth FAMAS Award for Best Actress in 1991, Aunor became the sixth performer to be elevated to the FAMAS Hall of Fame joining the likes of Eddie Garcia, Joseph Estrada, Charito Solis, Fernando Poe Jr. and Vilma Santos. This award is given to those who have won more than five award in its particular category. She is also the only performer in the history of FAMAS Awards to be nominated for 15 straight years from 1973 to 1987.

Aunor had more international best actress awards and nominations more than any other Filipino actor. She is the only Filipino actress who has won international awards from five different continents: 19th Cairo International Film Festival in 1995 (Africa), first East Asia Film and Television Award in 1997 and Asian Film Awards in 2013 (Asia), 31st Festival International du Film Indépendant de Bruxelles in 2004 and Premio Della Critica Indipendiente in 2013 (Europe), Asia Pacific Screen Award in 2013 (Australia) and from the Green Planet Movie Award (North America). Among Filipino actors, she had the most Lifetime Achievement Awards received locally and internationally for her contribution in film, television, music, and theater.

== Discography ==
In 1968, Aunor was contracted by Alpha Records on the recommendation of singer Carmen Soriano. Although Aunor's first singles were not major hits, she subsequently went on to break local record sales with songs including It's Time to Say Goodbye, Silently, Forever Loving You, It's Not Unusual. In her seven years with Alpha Records, Aunor was able to set all-time record sales. At the height of her popularity as a recording artist in the late 1960s and early 1970s, local records soared up to 60% of national sales according to Alpha Records Philippines.

She was the artist with the most singles in Philippine recording history (with more than 260 singles). Over-all she recorded more than 500 songs. She achieved more than 30 gold singles, a record in the local music industry. With estimated sales of one million units, Aunor's cover of "Pearly Shells" (1971) is one of the biggest-selling singles in the Philippines ever. She recorded some 46 hit long-playing albums, and several extended plays.

== Selected filmography ==
Year	Film	Role	Notes
1972	And God Smiled at Me	Celina	Winner – Quezon City Film Festival for Best Actress
1972	A Gift of Love		Nominated – FAMAS Award for Best Actress: First of a Record 15 Consecutive Nominations
1973	Paruparong Itim		Nominated – FAMAS Award for Best Actress
1974	Fe, Esperanza, Caridad	Fe, Esperanza, Caridad	Nominated – FAMAS Award for Best Actress
1975	Banaue: Stairway to the Sky	Banaue	Nominated – FAMAS Award for Best Actress
1975	Batu-bato Sa Langit	Orang	Winner – 3rd Best Picture, First Metro Manila Film Festival (NV Productions)
1976	Tatlong Taong Walang Diyos	Rosario	Winner – FAMAS Award for Best Actress; First Ever Winner – Gawad Urian for Best Actress
1976	Minsa'y Isang Gamu-gamo	Corazon de la Cruz	Nominated – Metro Manila Film Festival for Best Actress
1976	Kaming Matatapang ang Apog	Potenciana Barada	Blockbuster Hit, first film collaboration with Dolphy
1977	Bakya Mo, Neneng	Neneng	Nominated – FAMAS Award for Best Actress; Winner – FAMAS Award for Best Picture
1977	Little Christmas Tree		First and only film collaboration between Nora Aunor and Fernando Poe, Jr.
1978	Atsay	Nelia de Leon	Winner – Metro Manila Film Festival Best Performer (equivalent to Best Actor, Best Actress, Best Supporting Actor, Best Supporting Actress Combined); Nominated – FAMAS Award for Best Actress
1978	Ikaw Ay Akin	Tere	Nominated – Gawad Urian for Best Actress
1978	Mahal Mo, Mahal Ko	Nora	Blockbuster Hit, Co-Starring Christopher de Leon and Tirso Cruz III
1978	Jack n Jill of the Third Kind		Top grosser, 1978 MMFF, co-starring Dolphy
1979	Ina Ka ng Anak Mo	Ester	Winner – Metro Manila Film Festival Award for Best Actress (tied with Lolita Rodriguez); Winner – FAMAS Award for Best Actress; Nominated – Gawad Urian for Best Actress; Nominated – Catholic Mass Media Awards for Best Actress 2nd Best Picture – 1979 MMFF
1979	Kasal-Kasalan, Bahay-Bahayan	Lagring	Topgrosser, 1979 MMFF; Winner – 1979 MMFF Best Picture; Co-Starring Christopher de Leon, Alma Moreno, Rudy Fernandez
1979	Annie Batungbakal	Annie	One of the biggest blockbuster hits of 1979
1980	Bona	Bona	Winner – Gawad Urian for Best Actress; Nominated – FAMAS Award for Best Actress; Nominated – 1980 Metro Manila Film Festival for Best Actress
1980	Kung Ako'y Iiwan Mo	Beatrice Alcala	Nominated – 1980 Metro Manila Film Festival for Best Actress
1981	Bakit Bughaw ang Langit	Babette	Winner – Catholic Mass Media Awards for Best Actress; Nominated – FAMAS Award for Best Actress; Nominated – Gawad Urian for Best Actress
1981	Rock n Roll		Nominated – 1981 Metro Manila Film Festival for Best Actress
1982	Himala	Elsa	Winner – Metro Manila Film Festival Best Actress; Winner – Parade Magazine Awards for Best Actress; Nominated – Gawad Urian for Best Actress; Nominated – Film Academy of the Philippines Awards for Best Actress; Nominated – Catholic Mass Media Awards for Best Actress
1982	Mga Uod at Rosas	Socorro	Nominated – FAMAS Award for Best Actress
1983	Minsan May Isang Ina	Ruth	Nominated – FAMAS Award for Best Actress
1984	Condemned	Yolly	Nominated – STAR Awards for Best Actress
1984	'Merika	Milagros Cruz	First Ever Winner – STAR Awards for Best Actress; Nominated – Gawad Urian for Best Actress
1984	Bulaklak sa City Jail	Angela	Winner – Metro Manila Film Festival Best Actress; Winner – FAMAS Award for Best Actress; Winner – Catholic Mass Media Awards for Best Actress; Nominated – Star Awards for Best Actress; Nominated – Gawad Urian for Best Actress; Nominated – Film Academy of the Philippines Awards for Best Actress
1985	I Can't Stop Loving You	Amy Mercado	Nominated – FAMAS Award for Best Actress; Nominated – 1985 Metro Manila Film Festival for Best Actress
1989	Bilangin ang mga Bituin sa Langit	Noli / Maggie	Winner – FAMAS Award for Best Actress; Winner – Gawad Urian for Best Actress; Winner – Film Academy of the Philippines Awards for Best Actress; Nominated – Star Awards for Best Actress – Movies; Nominated – Catholic Mass Media Awards for Best Actress
1990	Andrea, Paano Ba ang Maging Isang Ina?	Andrea	Winner – Metro Manila Film Festival Best Actress; Winner – FAMAS Award for Best Actress; Winner – Gawad Urian for Best Actress; Winner – Film Academy of the Philippines Awards for Best Actress; Winner – Star Awards for Best Actress – Movies; Winner – Young Critics Circle Award for Best Performance; Winner – Movie Magazine Awards for Best Actress
1991	Ang Totoong Buhay ni Pacita M.	Pacita Macaspac	Winner – Metro Manila Film Festival Best Actress; Winner – Film Academy of the Philippines Awards for Best Actress; Winner – Star Awards for Best Actress – Movies; Winner – Young Critics Circle Award for Best Performance; Winner – Movie Magazine Awards for Best Actress; Winner – Ateneo Galian Awards for Best Actress; Winner – KRITKA Awards for Best Actress; Nominated – Gawad Urian for Best Actress
1993	Inay	Sally Murillo-Corcuera	Winner – Young Critics Circle Award for Best Performance; Nominated – Metro Manila Film Festival Best Actress
1995	The Flor Contemplacion Story	Flor Contemplacion	Winner – Princess Pataten Statue for Best Actress (Cairo International Film Festival); FAMAS Awards for Circle of Excellence; Winner – Gawad Urian for Best Actress; Winner – Film Academy of the Philippines Awards for Best Actress; Winner – Star Awards for Best Actress – Movies; Winner – Young Critics Circle Award for Best Performance; Winner – Movie Magazine Awards for Best Actress; Winner – (PPC Publication) People's Choice Awards for Best Actress; Nominated – 1996 Fukuoka International Film Festival Awards for Best Actress
1995	Muling Umawit ang Puso	Loida Veranno	Winner – Metro Manila Film Festival Best Actress; Nominated – Young Critics Circle Award for Best Performance
1996	Bakit May Kahapon Pa?	Helen/Karina Salvacion	Winner – 1st East Asia Film and Television Awards for Best Actress (Penang, Malaysia); Winner – Gawad Urian for Best Actress; Nominated – Singapore International Film Festival awards for Best Actress; Nominated – Film Academy of the Philippines Awards for Best Actress; Nominated – Star Awards for Best Actress – Movies; Nominated – Young Critics Circle Award for Best Performance
1997	Babae	Bea	Nominated – Gawad Urian for Best Actress; Winner – (PPC Publication) People's Choice Awards for Best Actress; Nominated – Metro Manila Film Festival Best Actress
1999	Sidhi	Ana/ Ah	Nominated – Princess Pataten Statue for Best Actress (Cairo International Film Festival); Nominated – Singapore International Film Festival Award for Best Actress; Nominated – Gawad Urian for Best Actress; Nominated – Film Academy of the Philippines Awards for Best Actress; Nominated – Star Awards for Best Actress – Movies
2004	Naglalayag	Judge Dorinda Vda. De Roces	Winner – 31st Festival International du Film Indépendant de Bruxelles Awards for Best Actress; Winner – Manila Film Festival Awards for Best Actress; Winner – PASADO (Pampelikulang Samahan ng mga Dalubguro) Award for Best Actress; Winner – 2nd Gawad Tanglaw Awards for Best Actress; Winner – S Magazine People's Choice Awards for Best Actress; Winner – BALATCA (Batangas Laguna Teachers Association for Culture and the Arts) Awards for Best Actress; Nominated – Gawad Urian for Best Actress; Nominated – Film Academy of the Philippines Awards for Best Actress; Nominated – Star Awards for Best Actress – Movies; Nominated – Young Critics Circle Award for Best Performance; Nominated – Golden Screen Awards for Best Actress
2012	Thy Womb	Shaleha	Winner – Asian Film Award for Best Actress- Hong Kong; Winner -Asia Pacific Screen Award for Best Performance by an Actress- Australia; Winner – Bisato d'Oro for Best Actress – Venice, Italy; Winner – 3rd Sakhalin International Film Festival for best Actress – Russia; FAMAS Awards – Presidential Award for Cinematic Excellence; Winner – Gawad Urian for Best Actress; Winner – Young Critics Circle Award for Best Performance; Winner – PASADO (Pampelikulang Samahan ng mga Dalubguro) Award for Best Actress; Winner – Gawad Tangi For Films for Best Actress; Winner – Gawad Tanglaw for Best Actress; Winner – BALATCA (Batangas Laguna Teachers Association for Culture and the Arts) for Best Actress; Winner – Metro Manila Film Festival Best Actress; Winner – Philippine Edition Movie Awards for Favorite Actress- Drama; Nominated – Asia Pacific Film Festival Awards for Best Actress; Nominated – Dubai International Film Festival Awards for Best Actress; Nominated – International Film Festival of India Awards for Best Actress; Nominated – 3rd Sakhalin International Film Festival – Best Ensemble Acting Nominated – Star Awards for Movies for Best Actress; Nominated – Golden Screen Awards for Best Actress; Nominated – Film Academy of the Philippines Awards for Best Actress
