= 1979 Metro Manila Film Festival =

Annual Philippine Film Festival edition

- Date: December 25, 1979 to January 3, 1980
- Site: Manila

Highlights
- Best Picture: Kasal-Kasalan, Bahay-Bahayan
- Most awards: Ina Ka ng Anak Mo and Kasal-Kasalan, Bahay-Bahayan (3)

The 5th Metro Manila Film Festival was held in 1979.

Ten movies vied for top honors in the 1979 Metro Manila Film Festival. HPS Productions' Kasal-Kasalan, Bahay-Bahayan was named Best Film and was the top grosser of the festival. Ina Ka ng Anak Mo received three major awards including the Best Actor and Best Actress for Raul Aragon, and Lolita Rodriguez and Nora Aunor respectively.

== Entries ==
Title	Starring	Studio	Director	Genre
Alabok na Ginto	Roel Vergel de Dios, Veronica Jones, Allan Valenzuela, Anita Linda, Ruben Rustia, Renato Del Prado, Joe Garcia	MBM Productions	Dr. Antonio C. Martinez	Romance, War
Ang Alamat ni Julian Makabayan	Christopher de Leon, Charo Santos, Eddie Garcia, Perla Bautista, Johnny Delgado, Lilibeth Ranillo, Celso Ad. Castillo, Tony Santos Sr.	Ian Films	Celso Ad. Castillo	Action
Bugoy	Dolphy, Lotis Key, Panchito, Paquito Diaz, Max Alvarado, Ernie Ortega, Conde Ubaldo, Hero Bautista	Hemisphere Pictures	Jett C. Espiritu	Comedy
Ina Ka ng Anak Mo	Lolita Rodriguez, Nora Aunor, Raul Aragon	Movie Masters	Lino Brocka	Drama
Kadete	Jay Ilagan, Ronald Corveau, Rez Cortez, Anna Marin, Fred Montilla, Rosemarie Gil, Alicia Alonzo, Anita Linda, Romeo Rivera, Dino Kortes, Michael de Mesa, Marissa del Mar	Agrix Films Production	Emmanuel Borlaza	Drama
Kasal-Kasalan, Bahay-Bahayan	Nora Aunor, Christopher de Leon, Alma Moreno, Rudy Fernandez, Rebecca Gonzales, Lito Anzures, Jose Garcia, Matimtiman Cruz, German Moreno	HPS Film Productions	Pablo Santiago	Romance, Comedy
Ang Lihim ng Guadalupe	Fernando Poe, Jr., Tina Monasterio, Yvette Christine, Paquito Diaz, Lito Anzures, Vic Diaz, Romy Diaz, Bentot, Jr., Max Alvarado	FPJ Productions	Armando A. Herrera	Action, Adventure
Mamang Sorbertero	Joseph Estrada, Celeste Legaspi, Rod Navarro, Dencio Padilla, Subas Herrero, Quiel Segovia, Vic Sotto, Veronica Palileo	JE Productions	Augusto Buenaventura	Comedy
Modelong Tanso	Charito Solis, Vilma Santos	Bancom Audiovision	Cirio H. Santiago	Drama
Ang Sisiw ay Isang Agila	Lito Lapid, George Estregan, Dante Varona, David Aguila, Julie Ann Fortich, Lucita Soriano, Teroy de Guzman, Yoyoy Villame	Mirick Films International	Jun Gallardo	Action, Adventure

== Winners and nominees ==
=== Awards ===
Winners are listed first, highlighted with boldface and indicated with a double dagger (‡). Nominees are also listed if applicable.

Best Film	Best Director
**Kasal-kasalan, bahay-bahayan**‡; Ina Ka ng Anak Mo	**Lino Brocka – Ina ka ng Anak Mo**‡
Best Actor	Best Actress
**Raul Aragon – Ina ka ng Anak Mo**‡	**Nora Aunor -Ina ka ng Anak Mo**‡, and Lolita Rodriguez –Ina ka ng Anak Mo‡
Best Supporting Actor	Best Supporting Actress
**Johnny Delgado – Ang Alamat ni Julian Makabayan**‡	**Rebecca Gonzales – Kasal-kasalan, bahay-bahayan**‡
Best Sound Engineering	Best Cinematography
**Gaudencio Barredo – Kadete**‡	**Ben Lobo – Ang lihim ng Guadalupe**‡
Best Editing	Best Music
**Edgardo Vinarao – Kadete**‡	**Restie Umali – Ang Sisiw ay Isang Agila**‡
Best Story
**Rick Acasio – Kasal-kasalan, bahay-bahayan**‡

== Multiple awards ==
Awards	Film
3	Ina Ka ng Anak Mo
3	Kasal-kasalan, Bahay-bahayan
2	Kadete

Preceded by 1978 Metro Manila Film Festival	Metro Manila Film Festival; 1979	Succeeded by 1980 Metro Manila Film Festival
