= 1978 Metro Manila Film Festival =

Annual Philippine Festival edition

- Date: December 25, 1978 to January 3, 1979
- Site: Manila

Highlights
- Best Picture: Atsay
- Most awards: Atsay (4)

The 4th Metro Manila Film Festival had its run in 1978 starting from December 25 onwards. There were nine official entries and Atsay was hailed as the Festival's Best Film.

Ian Film Productions' Atsay received the most awards, with a total of four including Best Picture Award in the highly contested 1978 Metro Manila Film Festival. The movie also won for Nora Aunor the Best Performer Award, the first and only awardee of the category. Sampaguita Pictures' Rubia Servios received two awards: Best Screenplay for Mario O'Hara and Best Editing for Jose Tarnate. RVQ's Jack n' Jill of the Third Kind was the top grosser of the festival.

== Entries ==
Title	Starring	Studio	Director	Genre
Atsay	Nora Aunor, Ronald Corveau, Amy Austria, Armida Siguion-Reyna, Roldan Aquino, Renato Robles, Lilian Laing, Angie Ferro, Bella Flores	Ian Film Productions	Eddie Garcia	Drama, Romance
Garrote: Jai Alai King	Christopher de Leon, Marianne dela Riva, Dranreb, Johnny Delgado, Amy Austria, Cynthia Gonzales, Allan Valenzuela, Manny Luna	VP Pictures	Manuel 'Fyke' Cinco	Action, Drama, Sport
Ang Huling Lalaki ng Baluarte	Rey Malonzo, Tina Monasterio	SQ Film Productions	Artemio Marquez	Action
Jack n'Jill of the Third Kind	Dolphy, Nora Aunor, Rolly Quizon, Panchito, Paquito Diaz, Martin Marfil, Georgie Quizon, Max Vera	RVQ Productions	Frank Gray Jr.	Comedy
The Jess Lapid Story	Lito Lapid, Beth Bautista	Mirick Films	Gallardo	Action
Katawang Alabok	Robert Arevalo, Daisy Romualdez, Orestes Ojeda, Janet Bordon, Vic Silayan, Lorna Tolentino, Manny Luna, Anita Linda, Lucita Soriano	Agrix Film Productions	Emmanuel Borlaza	Drama
Kid Kaliwete	Bembol Roco, George Estregan, Trixia Gomez, Jean Saburit, Joonee Gamboa, Cynthia Gonzales, Val Iglesias	Associated Entertainment Corp.	Manuel 'Fyke' Cinco	Action, Sport
Rubia Servios	Vilma Santos, Mat Ranillo III, Phillip Salvador	Sampaguita Pictures	Lino Brocka	Drama
Salonga	Rudy Fernandez, George Estregan, Trixia Gomez, Ruel Vernal, Raul Aragon, Dencio Padilla, Amy Austria, Rodolfo 'Boy' Garcia, Jose Romulo, Veronica Jones	MBM Productions	Romy Suzara	Action, Drama

== Awards ==
Winners are listed first, highlighted with boldface and indicated with a double dagger (‡). Nominees are also listed if applicable.

Best Film	Best Director
**Atsay – Ian Film Productions**‡	**Eddie Garcia – Atsay**‡
Best Performer	Best Editing
**Nora Aunor – Atsay**‡	**Jose Tarnate – Rubia Servios**‡
Best Screenplay	Best Cinematography
**Mario O'Hara – Rubia Servios**‡	**Romeo Vitug – Atsay**‡
Best Art Direction
**Robert L. Lee III and Peter Perlas – Katawang Alabok**‡

== Multiple awards ==
Awards	Film
4	Atsay
2	Rubia Servios

== Ceremony Information ==
=== "Noranians" versus "Vilmanians" ===
The board of jurors decided to not award honors for Best Actor, Best Actress, Best Supporting Actor and Best Supporting Actress for some reasons. Instead, the jurors gave Nora Aunor a "Best Performer" award for her role in the movie Atsay. Ms. Aunor beat Ms. Santos, whom fortune-tellers on the talk show of Inday Badiday had predicted would win the award for her role in the movie Rubia Servios.

== Atsay vs. Rubia Servios commentary ==
In 1979, Isagani Cruz of TV Times commented about Atsay and Rubia Servios. He states: "Rubia Servios is Lino Brocka's film; Atsay is Eddie Garcia's. Nora does an excellent acting job; but so does Vilma Santos, and Rubia is a much more demanding and difficult role. Edgardo M. Reyes is an established literary figure, but Mario O'Hara is much better screenwriter. Overall, Atsay may be much more impressive than Rubia Servios. In terms of challenging our moral and legal convictions, however, Rubia Servios is much more significant."

Preceded by 1977 Metro Manila Film Festival	Metro Manila Film Festival; 1978	Succeeded by 1979 Metro Manila Film Festival
