= Metro Manila Film Festival Award for Best Director =

Annual Philippine film award

- Awarded for: Excellence in Cinematic Direction Achievement
- Country: Philippines
- Presented by: MMDA
- First award: 1975
- Currently held by: Jeffrey Jeturian; Unmarry (2025)
- Website: www.mmda.gov.ph/mmff/

The Metro Manila Film Festival Award for Best Director is an award presented annually by the Metropolitan Manila Development Authority (MMDA). It was first awarded at the 1st Metro Manila Film Festival ceremony, held in 1975; Augusto Buenaventura received the award for directing the film, Diligan Mo ng Hamog ang Uhaw na Lupa and it is given to directors working in the motion picture industry. Currently, nominees and winners are determined by Executive Committees, headed by the Metropolitan Manila Development Authority Chairman and key members of the film industry.

== Winners and nominees ==
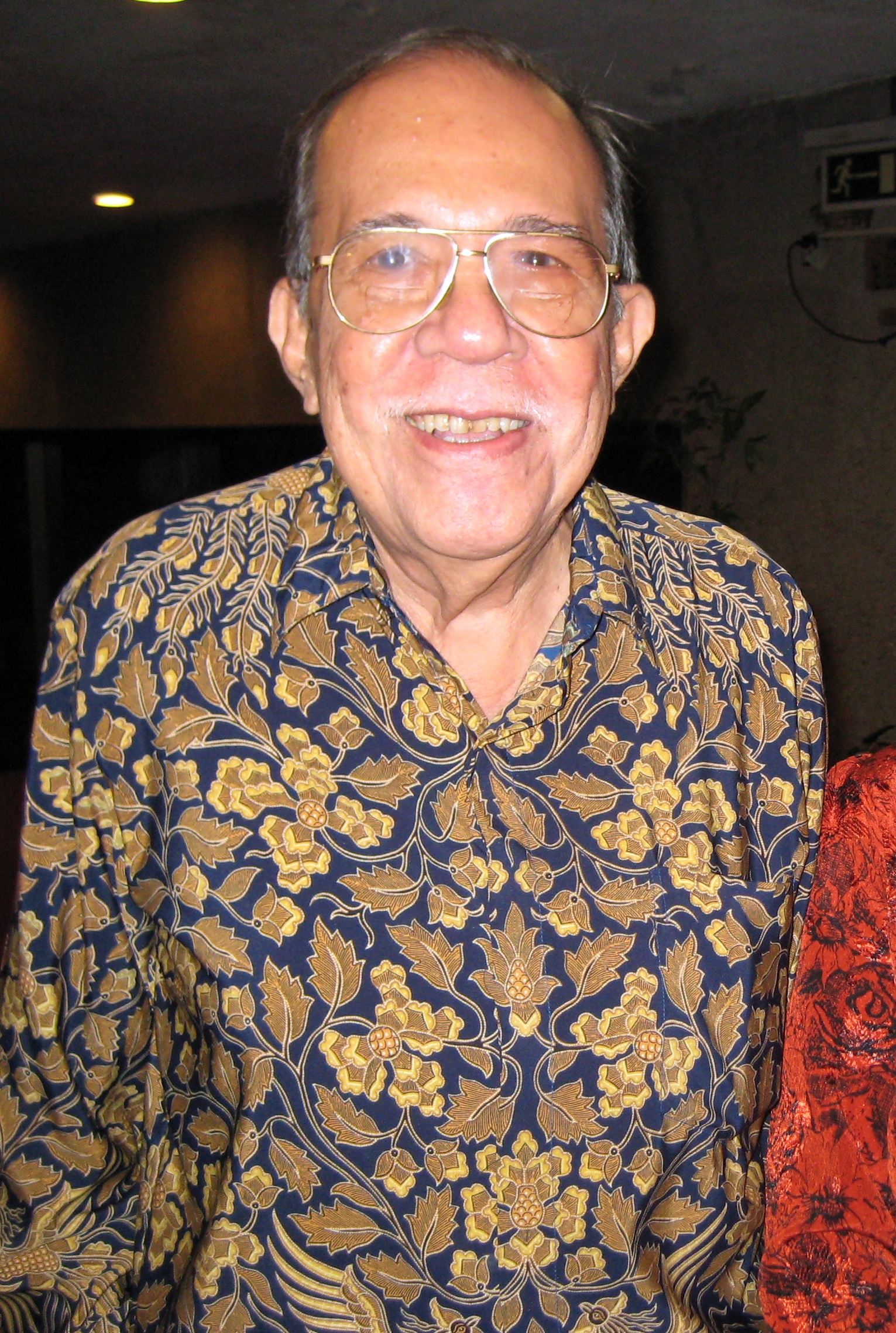
Eddie Romero won in 1976 for his directing in Ganito Kami Noon, Paano Kayo Ngayon.

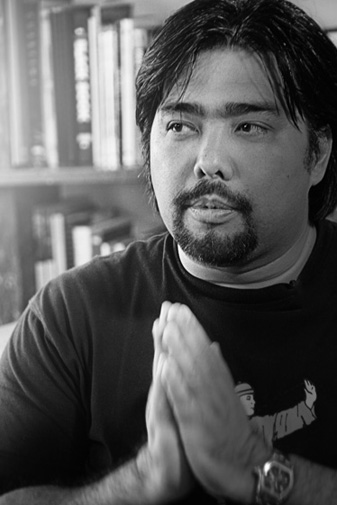
Mark Meily won several directing awards including his first win in 2003 in Crying Ladies.

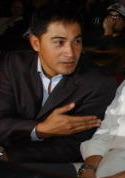
Cesar Montano won in 2004 for his directing in Panaghoy sa Suba.

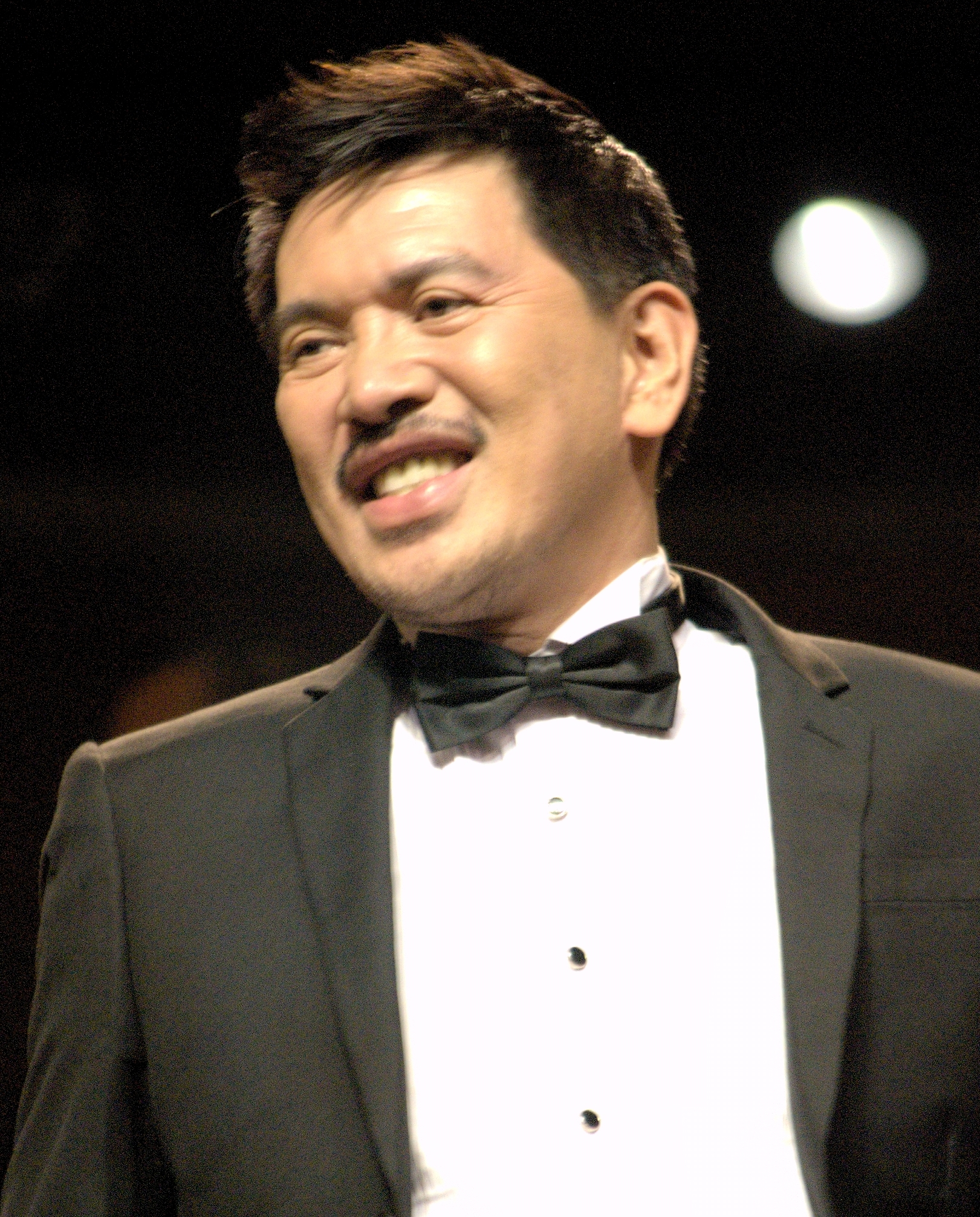
Brillante Mendoza won twice in 2012 and 2019 for his directing in Thy Womb and Mindanao.

| Key | Explanation |
|---|---|
| ‡ | Indicates the winning director |

=== 1970s ===
| Year | Director | Film | Ref |
|---|---|---|---|
| 1975 (1st) | Augusto Buenaventura‡ | Diligan Mo ng Hamog ang Uhaw na Lupa | |
| 1976 (2nd) | Eddie Romero ‡ | Ganito Kami Noon, Paano Kayo Ngayon | |
| 1976 (2nd) | Lupita Aquino-Kashiwahara | Minsa'y isang Gamu-gamo | |
| 1977 (3rd) | Celso Ad. Castillo ‡ | Burlesk Queen | |
| 1978 (4th) | Eddie Garcia ‡ | Atsay | |
| 1979 (5th) | Lino Brocka‡ | Ina ka ng Anak Mo | |

=== 1980s ===
| Year | Director | Film | Ref |
|---|---|---|---|
| 1980 (6th) | Marilou Diaz-Abaya‡ | Brutal | |
| 1981 (7th) | Mike De Leon ‡ | Kisapmata | |
| 1982 (8th) | Ishmael Bernal ‡ | Himala | |
| 1983 (9th) | Willie Milan ‡ | Bago Kumalat ang Kamandag | |
| 1984 (10th) | Mario O'Hara ‡ | Bulaklak sa City Jail | |
| 1985 (11th) | Lino Brocka‡ | Ano ang Kulay ng Mukha ng Diyos? | |
| 1986 (12th) | Mario O'Hara‡ | Halimaw sa Banga | |
| 1987 (13th) | Artemio Marquez ‡ | The Untold Story of Melanie Marquez | |
| 1988 (14th) | Laurice Guillen‡ | Magkano ang iyong dangal | |
| 1989 (15th) | Eddie Garcia‡ | Imortal | |

=== 1990s ===
| Year | Director | Film | Ref |
|---|---|---|---|
| 1990 (16th) | Gil Portes ‡ | Andrea, Paano Ba ang Maging Isang Ina? | |
| 1991 (17th) | Elwood Perez ‡ | Ang Totoong Buhay ni Pacita M. | |
| 1992 (18th) | Ike Jarlego, Jr. ‡ | Andres Manambit: Angkan ng Matatapang | |
| 1993 (19th) | Jose Javier Reyes‡ | May Minamahal | |
| 1994 (20th) | None (Note: No "Best Director" award given.) | | |
| 1995 (21st) | Joel Lamangan‡ | Muling Umawit ang Puso | |
| 1996 (22nd) | Peque Gallaga and Lore Reyes‡ | Magic Temple | |
| 1997 (23rd) | Chito Roño‡ | Nasaan Ang Puso? | |
| 1998 (24th) | Marilou Diaz-Abaya‡ | José Rizal | |
| 1999 (25th) | Marilou Diaz-Abaya‡ | Muro-ami | |

=== 2000s ===
| Year | Director | Film | Ref |
|---|---|---|---|
| 2000 (26th) | Laurice Guillen‡ | Tanging Yaman | |
| 2001 (27th) | Chito Roño‡ | Yamashita: The Tiger's Treasure | |
| 2002 (28th) | Joel Lamangan‡ | Mano Po | |
| 2003 (29th) | Mark Meily‡ | Crying Ladies | |
| 2004 (30th) | Cesar Montano‡ | Panaghoy sa Suba | |
| 2005 (31st) | Jose Javier Reyes‡ | Kutob | |
| 2006 (32nd) | Jose Javier Reyes‡ | Kasal, Kasali, Kasalo | |
| 2007 (33rd) | Cesar Apolinario ‡ | Banal | |
| 2008 (34th) | Mark Meily‡ | Baler | |
| 2009 (35th) | Joel Lamangan‡ | Mano Po 6: A Mother's Love | |
| 2009 (35th) | Rico Gutierrez, Don Michael Perez, Jessel Monteverde | Shake, Rattle & Roll 11 | |

=== 2010s ===
| Year | Director | Film | Ref |
|---|---|---|---|
| 2010 (36th) | Wenn Deramas‡ | Ang Tanging Ina Mo (Last na 'To!) | |
| 2011 (37th) | Tikoy Aguiluz‡ | Manila Kingpin: The Asiong Salonga Story | |
| 2011 (37th) | Tony Y. Reyes | Enteng Ng Ina Mo | |
| 2011 (37th) | Chris Martinez | Shake, Rattle & Roll 13 | |
| 2012 (38th) | Brillante Mendoza‡ | Thy Womb | |
| 2012 (38th) | Ruel Bayani | One More Try | |
| 2013 (39th) | Joyce Bernal‡ | 10,000 Hours | |
| 2013 (39th) | Chito S. Roño | Boy Golden: Shoot to Kill | |
| 2013 (39th) | Wenn Deramas | Girl, Boy, Bakla, Tomboy | |
| 2013 (39th) | Marlon Rivera | My Little Bossings | |
| 2013 (39th) | Frasco Mortiz | Pagpag: Siyam na Buhay | |
| 2014 (40th) | Dan Villegas‡ | English Only, Please | |
| 2014 (40th) | Erik Matti | Kubot: The Aswang Chronicles 2 | |
| 2014 (40th) | Chito S. Roño | Feng Shui 2 | |
| 2014 (40th) | Jerrold Tarog | Shake, Rattle & Roll XV - (Ulam) | |
| 2014 (40th) | Enzo Williams | Bonifacio: Ang Unang Pangulo | |
| 2015 (41st) | Erik Matti‡ | Honor Thy Father | |
| 2015 (41st) | Antoinette Jadaone | All You Need Is Pag-Ibig | |
| 2015 (41st) | Randolph Longjas | Buy Now, Die Later | |
| 2015 (41st) | Jose Javier Reyes | My Bebe Love: #KiligPaMore | |
| 2015 (41st) | Dan Villegas | #Walang Forever | |
| 2016 (42nd) | Erik Matti ‡ | Seklusyon | |
| 2016 (42nd) | Jun Lana | Die Beautiful | |
| 2016 (42nd) | Avid Liongoren | Saving Sally | |
| 2016 (42nd) | Babyruth Villarama | Sunday Beauty Queen | |
| 2017 (43rd) | Paul Soriano ‡ | Siargao | |
| 2017 (43rd) | Loy Arcenas | Ang Larawan | |
| 2017 (43rd) | Julius Alfonso | Deadma Walking | |
| 2017 (43rd) | Rodel Nacianceno | Ang Panday | |
| 2017 (43rd) | Dan Villegas | All of You | |
| 2018 (44th) | Joel Lamangan ‡ | Rainbow's Sunset | |
| 2018 (44th) | Yam Laranas | "Aurora" | |
| 2018 (44th) | Enrico Quizon | "One Great Love" | |
| 2019 (45th) | Brillante Mendoza ‡ | Mindanao | |
| 2019 (45th) | Carlo Ledesma | Sunod | |
| 2019 (45th) | Crisanto B. Aquino | Write About Love | |

=== 2020s ===
| Year | Director | Film | Ref |
|---|---|---|---|
| 2020 (46th) | Antoinette Jadaone‡ | Fan Girl | |
| 2020 (46th) | MacArthur Alejandre | Tagpuan | |
| 2020 (46th) | Christian Acuña | Magikland | |
| 2020 (46th) | Dolly Dulu | The Boy Foretold by the Stars | |
| 2020 (46th) | Easy Ferrer | The Missing | |
| 2021 (47th) | Jun Lana‡ | Big Night! | |
| 2021 (47th) | Carlo Francisco Manatad | Kun Maupay Man it Panahon | |
| 2021 (47th) | Lawrence Fajardo | A Hard Day | |
| 2022 (48th) | Mikhail Red‡ | Deleter | |
| 2022 (48th) | Shugo Praico | Nanahimik ang Gabi | |
| 2022 (48th) | Lester Dimaranan | Mamasapano: Now It Can Be Told | |
| 2022 (48th) | Joel Lamangan | My Father, Myself | |
| 2022 (48th) | Paul Soriano | My Teacher | |
| 2023 (49th) | Pepe Diokno‡ | GomBurZa | |
| 2023 (49th) | Zig Dulay | Firefly | |
| 2023 (49th) | Jun Lana | Becky & Badette | |
| 2023 (49th) | Mae Cruz-Alviar | Rewind | |
| 2023 (49th) | Derick Cabrido | Mallari | |
| 2023 (49th) | Rado Peru, Rommel Penesa | When I Met You In Tokyo | |
| 2024 (50th) | Crisanto Aquino‡ | My Future You | |
| 2024 (50th) | Michael Tuviera‡ | The Kingdom | |
| 2024 (50th) | Richard Somes | Topakk | |
| 2024 (50th) | Zig Dulay | Green Bones | |
| 2024 (50th) | Pepe Diokno | Isang Himala | |
| 2024 (50th) | Chito S. Roño | Espantaho | |
| 2025 (51st) | Jeffrey Jeturian‡ | Unmarry | |
| 2025 (51st) | Kip Oebanda | Bar Boys: After School | |
| 2025 (51st) | Jun Lana | Call Me Mother | |
| 2025 (51st) | Sigrid Andrea Bernardo | I'mPerfect | |
| 2025 (51st) | Raymond Red | Manila's Finest | |

== Multiple awards for Best Director ==
Throughout the history of Metro Manila Film Festival (MMFF), there have been directors who received multiple Awards for Best Director. As of 2019 (45nd MMFF), 11 directors have received two or more Best Director awards.

| Director | Record Set | First year awarded | Recent year awarded |
|---|---|---|---|
| Joel Lamangan | 3 | 1995 | 2009 |
| Jose Javier Reyes | 3 | 1993 | 2006 |
| Marilou Diaz-Abaya | 3 | 1980 | 1999 |
| Erik Matti | 2 | 2015 | 2016 |
| Mark Meily | 2 | 2003 | 2008 |
| Chito Rono | 2 | 1997 | 2001 |
| Laurice Guillen | 2 | 1988 | 2000 |
| Eddie Garcia | 2 | 1987 | 1989 |
| Mario O'Hara | 2 | 1984 | 1986 |
| Lino Brocka | 2 | 1979 | 1985 |
| Brillante Mendoza | 2 | 2012 | 2019 |
