= 1977 Metro Manila Film Festival =

Philippine film festival

- Date: December 24, 1977 to January 2, 1978
- Site: Manila

Highlights
- Best Picture: Burlesk Queen
- Most awards: Burlesk Queen (7)

The 1977 Metro Manila Film Festival is the third festival in the series. Previously known as the Metropolitan Film Festival and Filipino Film Festival, the festival featured a total of nine film entries and ran for 10 days.

In this year, only two films were awarded. Ian Film Productions' Burlesk Queen, the top grosser of the MMFF, romped away with most of the awards. It won seven major awards including the Best Film, Best Actress for Vilma Santos, Best Actor for Rolly Quizon, and more. Pera Films' Mga Bilanggong Birhen won two awards: Best Cinematography for Romy Vitug and Best Art Direction for Laida Lim-Perez.

== Entries ==
Title	Starring	Studio	Director	Genre
Babae... Ngayon at Kailanman	Charito Solis, Gloria Diaz, Chanda Romero, Vivian Velez	Melros Productions	Joey Gosiengfiao	Drama
Bakya Mo, Neneng	Joseph Estrada, Nora Aunor, Tirso Cruz III, Gloria Sevilla, Angelo Castro, Jr., Ramon D' Salva, Angelo Ventura	JE Productions	Augusto Buenaventura	Action, comedy, romance
Banta ng Kahapon	Vic Vargas, Rafael Roco Jr., Roland Dantes, Chanda Romero	Hemisphere Films	Eddie Romero	Action
Mga Bilanggong Birhen	Alma Moreno, Trixia Gomez, Rez Cortez, Armida Siguion-Reyna, Monang Carvajal, Leroy Salvador	Perafilms	Mario O'Hara & Romy Suzara	Period drama
Burlesk Queen	Vilma Santos, Rolly Quizon, Rosemarie Gil, Joonee Gamboa, Leopoldo Salcedo, Roldan Aquino, Chito Ponce Enrile, Dexter Doria, Yolanda Luna	Ian Film Productions	Celso Ad. Castillo	Drama, romance
Inay	Dindo Fernando, Chanda Romero, Orestes Ojeda, Laurice Guillen, Ace Vergel, Dexter Doria, Alicia Vergel	Lotus Films	Lino Brocka	Drama, comedy
Kung Mangarap Ka't Magising	Christopher de Leon, Hilda Koronel	LVN Pictures	Mike de Leon	Coming-of-age, drama, romance, musical
Sa Piling ng Mga Sugapa	Mat Ranillo III, Bembol Roco, Chanda Romero	Sining Silangan	Gil Portes	Drama
Walang Katapusang Tag-araw	Charito Solis, Mat Ranillo III, Eddie Garcia	Lea Productions	Ishmael Bernal	Drama, romance

== Awards ==
Winners are listed first, highlighted with boldface and indicated with a double dagger (‡). Nominees are also listed if applicable.

Best Film	Best Director
**Burlesk Queen – Ian Film Productions**‡	**Celso Ad Castillo – Burlesk Queen**‡
Best Actor	Best Actress
**Rolly Quizon – Burlesk Queen**‡	**Vilma Santos – Burlesk Queen**‡
Best Supporting Actor	Best Supporting Actress
**Joonee Gamboa – Burlesk Queen**‡	**Rosemarie Gil – Burlesk Queen**‡
Best Screenplay	Best Cinematography
**Mauro Gia Samonte – Burlesk Queen**‡	**Romeo Vitug – Mga Bilanggong Birhen**‡
Best Art Direction
**Laida Lim-Perez – Mga Bilanggong Birhen**‡

== Multiple awards ==
Awards	Film
7	Burlesk Queen
2	Mga Bilanggong Birhen

== Ceremony information ==
=== Box office ===
According to the Philippine Motion Picture Producers' Association (PMPPA) as headed by actor Fernando Poe Jr., the combined gross of the films during the 10-day festival amounted to ₱7.68 million, surpassing the ₱5.4 million gross of the 1976 edition.

=== Controversies ===
Director Lino Brocka walked out of the awarding ceremonies at the Metropolitan Theater when Celso Ad. Castillo's Burlesk Queen starring Vilma Santos won eight of the ten awards including the Best Picture award. Mr. Brocka reportedly threw invectives at Rolando Tinio, who was the chairman of the panel of judges of the festival. It was also reported that organizers asked the winners to return their medals (the MMFF handed out medals that year) due to the controversy. However, this turned out to be just a rumor as all winners still have their awards to this day.

Preceded by 1976 Metro Manila Film Festival	Metro Manila Film Festival; 1977	Succeeded by 1978 Metro Manila Film Festival
