= Raoul Aragon =

Filipino actor (1947/1948–2026)

- Born: Raul Aragon; 1947 or 1948; Philippines
- Died: 22 January 2026 (aged 78); Downey, California, U.S.
- Other names: Raul Aragon; Raoul Aragonn
- Occupation: Actor
- Years active: 1969–1995

Raoul Aragon (1947 or 1948 – 22 January 2026) was a Filipino actor in drama and action films in the Philippines. Aragon was nominated in Gawad Urian Award 1980 as Best Actor in the film Ina ka ng Anak Mo and he won the Best Actor award in Metro Manila Film Festival 1979 in the same film (Ina Ka ng Anak Mo). He was also known as Raul Aragon or Raoul Aragonn.

== Career ==
Aragon was the leading man of Nora Aunor in the film Ina Ka Ng Anak Mo with Lolita Rodriguez, directed by Lino Brocka, which he played the husband of Nora Aunor.

== Personal life and death ==
Born Dominador Tampadong, Aragon was married to Josie and had five children. He later migrated to the United States. Aragon died in Downey, California, on 22 January 2026, at the age of 78.

== Filmography ==
- 1969 Adriana ---starring Amalia Fuentes, Luis Gonzales, Dante Rivero
- 1970 Young Love ---starring Nora Aunor, Tirso Cruz III, Vilma Santos, Edgar Mortiz
- 1970 Dream Of Jeanne ---starring Manny de Leon, Mila del Sol
- 1970 From Both Sides Now ---starring Rosemarie Sonora, Tirso Cruz III
- 1970 For Once In My Life ---starring Esperanza Fabon, Baby Alcaraz
- 1970 Your Love ---starring Eddie Peregrina
- 1972 Till Death Do Us Part ---starring Hilda Koronel
- 1972 Sixteen ---starring Vilma Santos, Edgar Mortiz
- 1973 Ikaw Lamang ---starring Vilma Santos
- 1973 Tanikalang Dugo ---starring Dante Rivero, Boots Anson-Roa
- 1974 Huli Huli Yan! ---starring Dolphy
- 1975 Meron Akong Nakita ---starring Dolphy, Gina Pareño, Lotis Key
- 1976 Bertong Suklab ---starring Ramon Revilla, Anna Gonzales
- 1976 Beloy Montemayor ---starring Ramon Revilla
- 1976 Babaing Hiwalay Sa Asawa ---starring Amalia Fuentes, Vic Vargas
- 1977 Walang Bakas Na Naiiwan ---starring Dante Rivero, Celia Rodriguez, Dante Varona
- 1977 Mapupulang Labi ---starring Carmen Ronda, Johnny Delgado
- 1977 Pag-ibig Ko'y Awitin Mo ---starring Nora Aunor, Armida Siguion-Reyna
- 1977 Ang Huling Babae Sa Daigdig ---starring Leila Hermosa
- 1977 Lalaki, Babae Kami ---starring Pinky de Leon, Alona Alegre, Eddie Garcia
- 1977 Task Force Kingfisher ---starring Ramon Revilla, Rosanna Ortiz
- 1978 Basta Kabit, May Sabit ---starring Trixia Gomez, Vivian Velez, Eddie Gutierrez, Orestes Ojeda
- 1978 Boy Pena ---starring Bembol Roco, Chanda Romero, Michael de Mesa
- 1978 Salonga ---starring Rudy Fernandez
- 1979 Hold Up (Special Squad, D.B.) ---starring Vic Vargas, Rudy Fernandez
- 1979 Ina, Kapatid, Anak ---starring Lolita Rodriguez, Charito Solis, Ric Rodrigo, Rio Locsin
- 1979 Ina ka ng Anak Mo ---starring Nora Aunor, Lolita Rodriguez
- 1980 Ex-Wife
- 1980 Palawan
- 1980 Ang Kabiyak
- 1980 Alaga
- 1980 Tres Kantos
- 1980 Angela Markado
- 1980 Waikiki
- 1981 Kamakalawa
- 1981 The Betamax Story
- 1981 Kontrobersyal
- 1982 Karibal Ko ang Aking Ina
- 1982 Task Force King Fisher Beloy Montemayor
- 1982 Guillermo Soliman
- 1982 Krus sa Bawat Punglo
- 1982 Santa Claus Is Coming to Town!
- 1983 Indecent Exposure
- 1983 Inside Job
- 1983 Kirot
- 1983 Strangers in Paradise
- 1983 To Mama with Love
- 1983 Babaeng Selyado
- 1983 Hubad Na Gubat
- 1983 Public Enemy No. 1 and the Innocents
- 1983 Laruan
- 1983 Teng Teng De Sarapen
- 1983 Over My Dead Body
- 1983 Bago Kumalat ang Kamandag
- 1984 Sigaw ng Katarungan
- 1984 Ahas sa Paraiso
- 1984 Bangkang Papel Sa Dagat ng Apoy
- 1984 Nalalasap ang Hapdi
- 1984 Daang Hari
- 1984 Dumalaga
- 1984 Experience
- 1984 Sariwa
- 1985 Ben Tumbling
- 1985 Matamis ang Nakaw Na Tubig
- 1985 Cop Brutus Logan, The Crime Buster
- 1985 Baun Gang
- 1985 Mga Alipin Ng Laman
- 1985 Lihim sa Likod ng Buwan
- 1985 Nene
- 1985 Ulo ng Gang-Ho
- 1985 Mga Manikang Hubad
- 1985 Alyas Junior Buang, Mad Killer ng Visayas
- 1985 Anak ng Tondo
- 1985 Uhaw Na Uhaw
- 1985 Eden
- 1985 Bayan Ko: Kapit sa Patalim
- 1985 Boboy Tibayan, Tigre ng Cavite
- 1986 Panganib Bawat Sandali ng Ligaya
- 1986 Hapdi
- 1986 Sloane
- 1986 Revenge of the Street Warrior
- 1986 Gisingin Natin ang Gabi
- 1986 Huwag Pamarisan: Kulasisi
- 1986 Huwag Mo Kaming Isumpa
- 1986 Hiram Na Katawan
- 1986 Kapirasong Dangal
- 1986 Bukas... Wala ng Bala
- 1986 Walang Ititirang Buhay
- 1987 Operation: Get Victor Corpuz, the Rebel Soldier
- 1987 Kapitan Pablo
- 1987 Humanda Ka... Ikaw ang Susunod
- 1987 Cabarlo
- 1987 Pasan Ko ang Daigdig
- 1987 Olongapo... The Great American Dream
- 1988 Naglalarong Puso
- 1988 Boy Negro
- 1988 Ambush
- 1988 White Force
- 1988 Patrolman
- 1988 Agila ng Maynila
- 1989 Sgt. Niñonuevo: The Fastest Gun Alive of WPD - as Kumander Pamintuan
- 1989 Arrest: Pat. Rizal Alih – Zamboanga Massacre - as Colonel Romeo Abendan
- 1989 Florencio Dino Public Enemy No. 1 of Caloocan
- 1989 Get Commander Jack Moro: Bangsa Moro Army
- 1989 Moises Platon
- 1989 Hindi Pahuhuli ng Buhay - as Dolpo
- 1989 Delima Gang
- 1989 Ang Babaeng Nawawala sa Sarili
- 1990 Irampa si Mediavillo
- 1990 Target... Police General: Major General Alfredo Lim Story
- 1990 Double M
- 1990 Hulihin Si... Boy Amores
- 1990 Kahit Singko Ay Di Ko Babayaran ang Buhay Mo - as Jimmy
- 1990 Bala at Rosaryo
- 1990 APO: Kingpin ng Maynila
- 1991 Kapitan Jaylo: Batas sa Batas
- 1991 Ganti ng Api
- 1991 McBain
- 1995 Sana Maulit Muli

== Awards ==
Year	Group	Category	Work	Result
1979	Metro Manila Film Festival	Best Actor	Ina ka ng Anak Mo	Won
