= The Captive Virgins =

1977 film directed by Mario O'Hara and Romy Suzara

Mga Bilanggong Birhen
- The poster of the film's restored version, released in 2019
- Directed by: Mario O'Hara; Romy V. Suzara
- Written by: Mario O'Hara
- Produced by: Armida Siguion-Reyna
- Starring: Alma Moreno; Trixia Gomez; Armida Siguion-Reyna; Rez Cortez; Leroy Salvador; Mario Montenegro
- Cinematography: Romeo Vitug
- Edited by: Ike Jarlego
- Music by: Ryan Cayabyab
- Production company: Pera Films
- Distributed by: ABS-CBN Film Productions (restored version)
- Release date: December 24, 1977
- Running time: 125 minutes
- Country: Philippines
- Languages: Filipino; Spanish

Mga Bilanggong Birhen (English: The Captive Virgins) is a controversial 1977 Philippine period drama film produced by Armida Siguion-Reyna and directed by Mario O'Hara and Romy Suzara from a screenplay written by O'Hara. The movie served as a commentary on the state of the Philippines in the 1920s during the American colonial period.

The film was restored in 4K high-definition by the ABS-CBN Film Archives through the facilities of Central Digital Lab in Makati as part of the Centennial Year of the Philippine Cinema. For overseas releases, the film's title is renamed as Familia Sagrada.

== Synopsis ==
In 1923, during the American colonial period in the Philippines, the Pulahan movement resurfaced under the leadership of Pablo to oppose agrarian injustice and abuses by local landowners. The conflict involved class tensions, acts of betrayal within local communities, and financial strains, which led to the capture of women during military engagements.

== Plot ==
It was 1898 in one province in the Visayas region, the people began rebelling against the Spaniards towards its independence and the story begins at the Sagrada household, while Felipa is playing the piano, a man silently intrudes the house and looks at her infant son sleeping on his bed. However, when their house helper returns, he kidnaps the baby and they leave. Twenty-two years later, the year 1920, the Americans became the colonial ruler of the country but the dreams of an independent Philippines have not yet been forgotten. On the other side, the Pulajanes have revived and they began to instigate violence against the landowning clans.

On that day, a group of Pulajanes ambushed the anti-revolutionary army and this was witnessed by Celina and her family who were returned from Manila. The family arrived at the plantation, owned by the head of the family and Celina's grandmother Isabela. At night, a group of Pulajanes raided and set the plantation on fire. Meanwhile, Celina shows her skills by playing a piano but it got interrupted by Tiago informing them that the plantation's on fire. Later that night, the father Juan returns to the plantation. Isabela scolds Juan for not checking on the plantation and instructs them to interrogate a captured man to locate their hideout.

== Cast ==
- Alma Moreno as Celina
- Trixia Gomez as Milagros
- Armida Siguion-Reyna as Felipa
- Rez Cortez as David
- Leroy Salvador as Señor Juan
- Mario Montenegro as Captain Pablo
- Monang Carvajal
- Ronnie Lazaro as Hermes
- Rodel Naval

== Production ==
According to the memoir "Armida" by Monique Villonco, Mga Bilanggong Birhen was shot in the town of Bacolor in the province of Pampanga. In housing the film's cast and staff, they initially wanted to rent the residents' houses for them but it never materialized, citing a lack of financial budget. Later on, they decided to rent the house of Charlie Valdes, the classmate of Armida's husband Leonardo Siguion-Reyna, where they spent three weeks in the said place during its shooting period. Leonardo Siguion-Reyna was also responsible for bringing an old car from the late industrialist Andrés Soriano to the town of Bacolor. Laida Lim Perez was assigned to design the film's main set.

== Release ==
The film was premiered on December 24, 1977, as part of the 3rd Metro Manila Film Festival.

=== Digital restoration ===
The film was restored by ABS-CBN Film Restoration and Central Digital Lab in Makati, Metro Manila. Reyna Films, the film production company owned and operated by Armida's son Carlos Siguion-Reyna and his wife Bibeth Orteza, provided the 35mm master negatives and sound negatives for the 1977 movie Mga Bilanggong Birhen.

The film's restored version was premiered at Cinema '76 Film Society in San Juan, Metro Manila. The film's co-director Romy Suzara, lead actress Alma Moreno, and cinematographer Romy Vitug attended the film. Actress Jobelle Salvador, the daughter of Leroy Salvador; producer Bibeth Orteza, daughter-in-law of Armida Siguion-Reyna; and Tess Carvajal, the granddaughter of Monang Carvajal also attended to represent the cast and crew.

== Controversy ==
The film was left unfinished when Mario O'Hara left the production before the shooting ended, following a misunderstanding between Armida and the director. Eventually, director Romy V. Suzara decided to finish the remaining parts of the film. During the film's post-production, Lino Brocka, who has a role in the film, demanded to the actress-producer to remove his scenes except the integral scene with the young Alma Moreno.
