= Ina Ka ng Anak Mo =

- Official theatrical poster for the 1979 Metro Manila Film Festival
- Directed by: Lino Brocka
- Screenplay by: Jose Dalisay Jr.; Leticia Fariñas
- Story by: Leticia Fariñas
- Produced by: Lourdes A. Marquez
- Starring: Nora Aunor; Lolita Rodriguez
- Cinematography: Condrado Baltazar
- Edited by: Edgardo Vinarao
- Music by: Ed Pagayon
- Production company: PPT Productions
- Release date: December 25, 1979
- Running time: 116 minutes
- Country: Philippines
- Language: Filipino
- Box office: ₱18.5 million

Ina Ka ng Anak Mo (lit. 'You Are the Mother of Your Daughter') is a 1979 Filipino film directed by Lino Brocka and starring Nora Aunor. The film was an official entry to the 1979 Metro Manila Film Festival, and garnered several awards including Best Actor for Raoul Aragonn and a tie for Best Actress between Lolita Rodriguez and Nora Aunor. It also garnered several nominations in the following year's FAMAS and Gawad Urian. Despite its adult theme and rating, the film was successful at the box office during its commercial run. The story portrays the everyday life of the deeply religious Renata (Lolita Rodriguez) and her daughter Ester (Nora Aunor), who is married to Luis (Raoul Aragonn).

This is Nora's first movie under the direction of Lino Brocka and an entry to the 1979 Metro Manila Film Festival.

== Plot ==
Renata Lacuesta is a 43 year old devout Catholic widow, shown attending mass in Quiapo Church, walking the length of the church on her knees, and hosting a rosary prayer session in her home. Her daughter, Esther Lacuesta-Postigo lives with her and sees the prayer gathering. That night, dinner is delayed as Renata started preparations late due to the prayer gathering. Renata urges Esther to go to Obando Church to dance and offer eggs to St. Clara, so that Esther and her husband, Luis Postigo can finally have children, as they have been unable to bear children after four years of marriage. Renata believes this might be more effective than seeing doctors. Esther is incensed at this discussion.

Esther works as a social worker, teaching family planning to local communities. Luis works in a corporate job, and hears one of his former colleague's experience working abroad in Saudi Arabia. He discusses with Esther the possibility of doing so as well, even just for a year, so he can save up and do business instead. Esther is unhappy with this and believes he would like to work abroad because of her infertility. Esther becomes withdrawn because of Luis' continued insistence on working abroad. Esther reveals to Renata that the reason she does not agree to Luis working abroad is because her father died in an accident while working abroad in the U.S. Esther blames Renata for driving her father to working abroad to meet his death.

Renata is unhappy over this accusation and gets into a verbal argument with Esther and breaks down in tears. The next day, Esther leaves for Baguio for a work assignment. Renata is drinking on her own and Luis asks about her life. She shares with Luis that the reason why she asked her husband to work abroad was to be able to earn money to send Esther to school and to build her a brighter future. Renata breaks down in tears, and Luis takes Renata and sleeps with her. When Esther returns, she apologizes to both Renata and Luis. Both are distant but Luis later sleeps with her.

Renata discovers that she is pregnant and carrying the child of Luis. Luis suggests that Renata go through an abortion but she refuses. Instead she goes with the suggestion of her moving to Cebu to stay with friends of Luis as the elder sister of Luis, on the pretext that her husband is abroad and thus needs to live with other people to help her during her pregnancy. Esther is told by Renata that she will go on a vacation in Cebu to be with her friend who needs help with her business. Esther is surprised but accepts Renata's decision. Esther enjoys the freedom from her mother but finds that Luis is not receptive to intimacy with her.

Renata gives birth to a healthy baby. She sends a telegram to Luis to inform him, and Luis visits her in Cebu, but informs Esther that he was being assigned temporarily to his office's Davao City branch. Esther is suspicious and finds out that Luis' employer does not have a Davao branch. She finds the telegram that Renata sent Luis and goes to Cebu. She is shocked to find her mother having just given birth and deduces that the child is the fruit of Luis and Renata. She breaks down in despair.

Later, Esther files a criminal complaint against Renata and Luis for concubinage. During the trial, Luis admits that he had sexual intercourse with Renata, and the latter did not resist. Renata was also forced to admit that she had already been widowed for 11 years and it was implied that she sought sexual pleasure which had been denied since her husband's death. During the trial's continuation, Esther moves to withdraw her complaint against Renata and Luis. Luis is delighted as he believes Esther has forgiven them. But Renata believes Esther has imprisoned them in shame.

Luis finds Renata at home on her knees, delirious in prayer. She said that she has had visions of God slapping her face until she was bloody and then God's tears fell on her face to cleanse her and that she had been forgiven. Later, her neighbors hear constant cries of the baby so they enter the residence and found Renata unconscious. Renata is hospitalized and begs for Esther's forgiveness, and asks Esther to take care of the baby. Renata dies before Esther is able to respond.

Luis visits Esther and informs her that he has found a couple who are willing to adopt the baby. He informs her that once the adoption is finished, he will also continue his application to work in Saudi Arabia. Esther does not respond. In the final scene, Esther visits Luis and finds the baby crying. She picks up and soothes the baby.

== Cast ==
- Nora Aunor as Esther Lacuesta-Postigo
- Lolita Rodriguez as Renata Lacuesta
- Raoul Aragon as Luis Postigo
- Lorli Villanueva as Counsel for the defense
- Carlito Bonoy Gonzaga as Tirso
- Crisanta Cruz as Alma

== Awards ==
Year	Group	Category	Nominee	Result
1979	Metro Manila Film Festival	Best Picture	Ina Ka ng Anak Mo	Won
1979	Metro Manila Film Festival	Best Director	Lino Brocka	Won
1979	Metro Manila Film Festival	Best Actress	Nora Aunor	Won
1979	Metro Manila Film Festival	Best Actress	Lolita Rodriguez	Won
1979	Metro Manila Film Festival	Best Actor	Raoul Aragonn	Won
1980	Filipino Academy of Movie Arts and Sciences Awards (FAMAS)	Best Actress	Nora Aunor	Won
1980	Filipino Academy of Movie Arts and Sciences Awards (FAMAS)	Best Picture	Ina Ka ng Anak Mo	Nominated
1980	Filipino Academy of Movie Arts and Sciences Awards (FAMAS)	Best Story	Leticia Fariñas	Nominated
1980	Gawad Urian Awards (Manunuri ng Pelikulang Pilipino)	Best Actress	Nora Aunor	Nominated
1980	Gawad Urian Awards (Manunuri ng Pelikulang Pilipino)	Best Actress	Lolita Rodriguez	Nominated
1980	Gawad Urian Awards (Manunuri ng Pelikulang Pilipino)	Best Actor	Raoul Aragonn	Nominated
