= Metro Manila Film Festival Award for Best Actress =

Philippine annual award

- Awarded for: Best Performance by an Actress in a Leading Role
- Country: Philippines
- Presented by: MMDA
- First award: 1975
- Currently held by: Krystel Go, I'mPerfect (2025)
- Website: www.mmda.gov.ph/mmff/

The Metro Manila Film Festival Award for Best Actress is an award presented annually by the Metropolitan Manila Development Authority (MMDA). It was first awarded at the 1st Metro Manila Film Festival ceremony, held in 1975; Charito Solis received the award for her role in Araw-Araw, Gabi-Gabi and it is given in honor of an actress who has delivered an outstanding performance in a leading role while working within the film industry. Currently, nominees and winners are determined by Executive Committees, headed by the Metropolitan Manila Development Authority Chairman and key members of the film industry.

== Winners and nominees ==
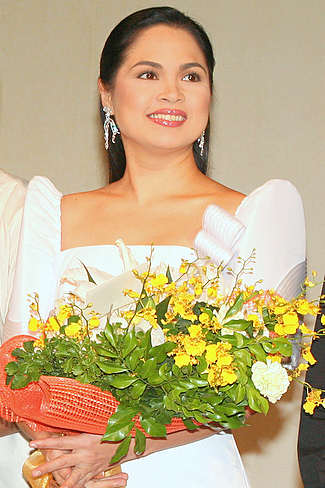
Judy Ann Santos won in 2006, 2019, and 2024 for her performances in Kasal, Kasali, Kasalo., Mindanao, and Espantaho respectively.

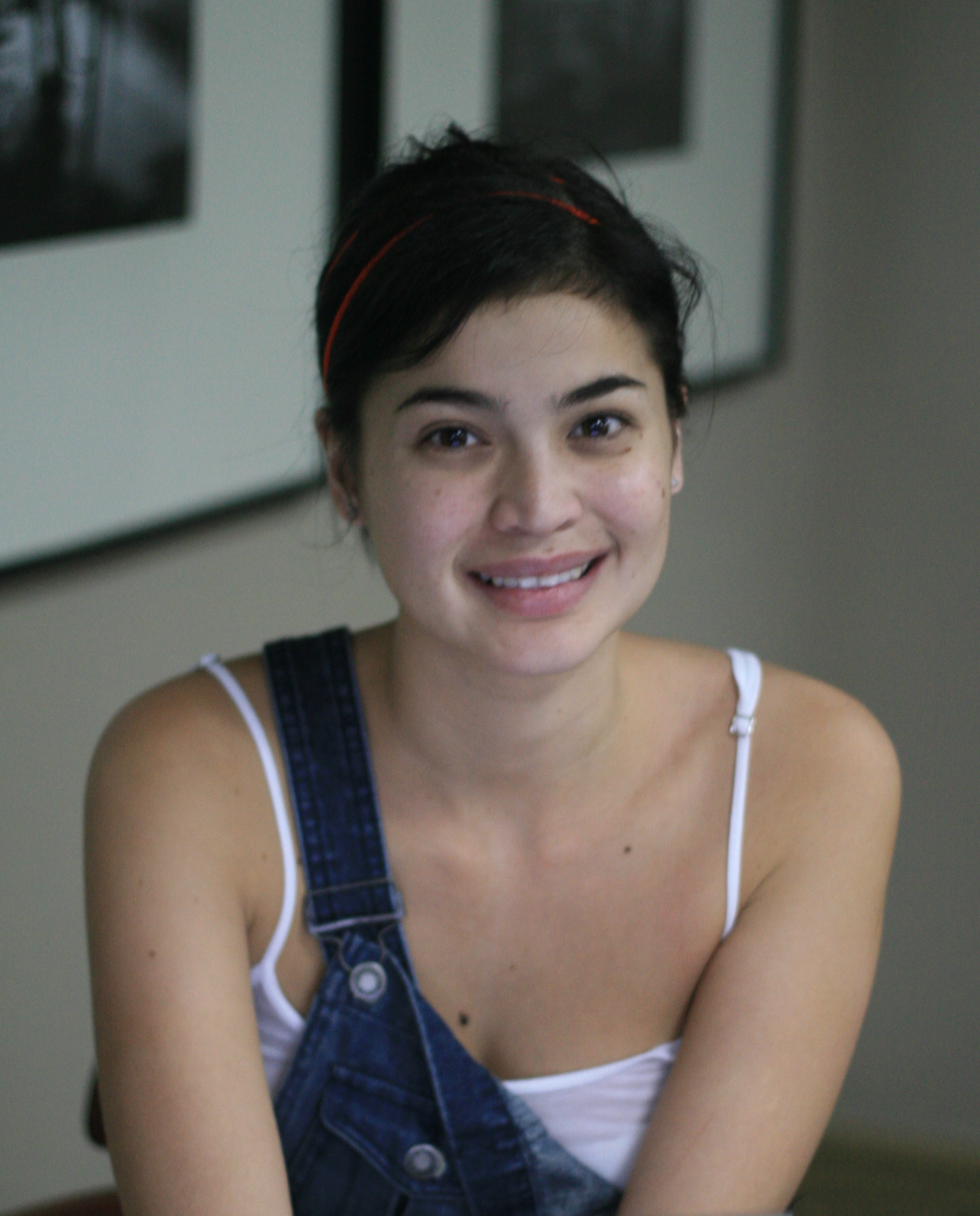
Anne Curtis won in 2008 for her role in Baler.

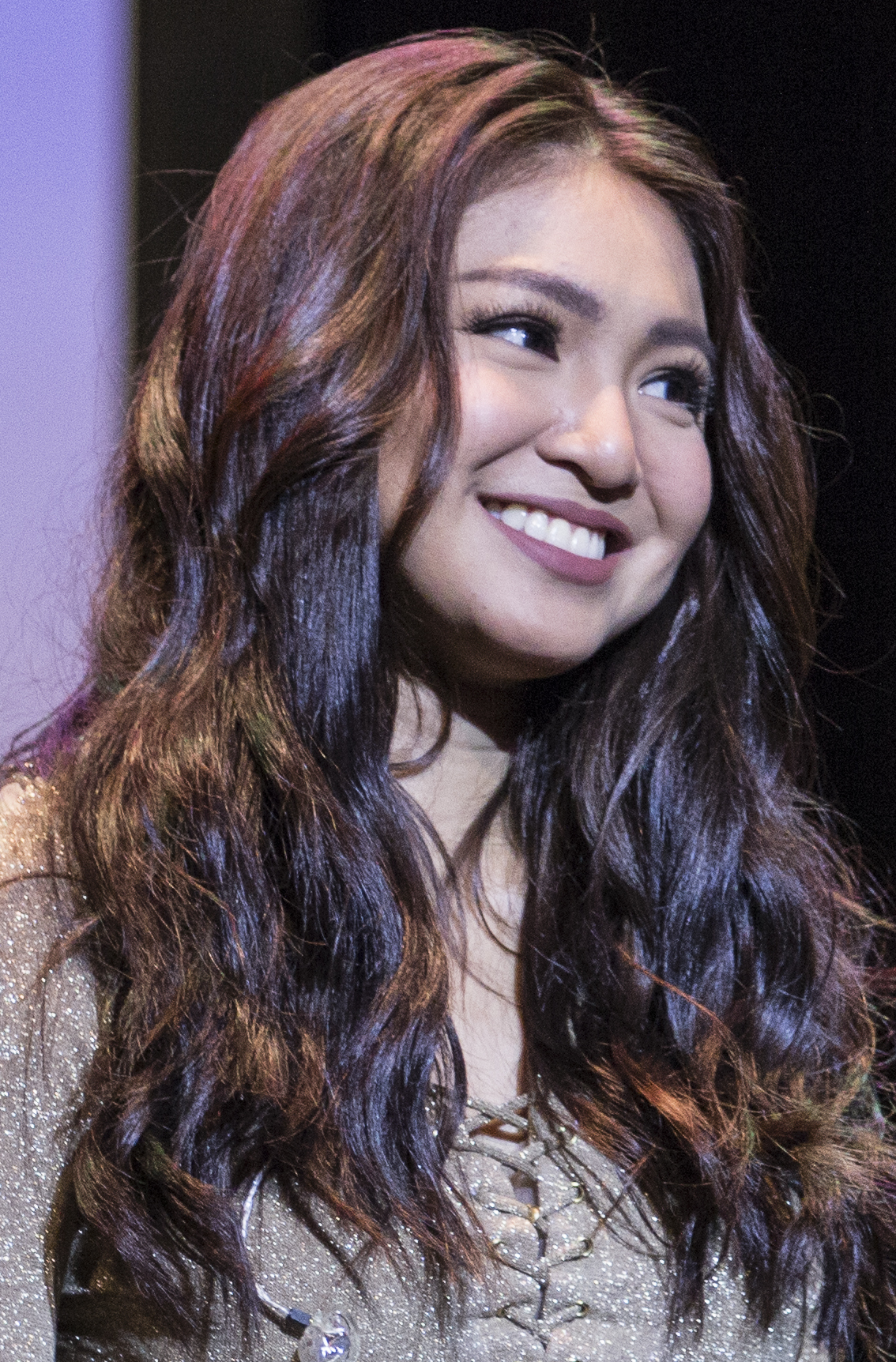
Nadine Lustre won in 2022 for her role in Deleter.

Key	Explanation
‡	Indicates the winning actress

=== 1970s ===
Year	Actress	Film	Role	Ref
1975 (1st)	Charito Solis‡	Araw-Araw, Gabi-Gabi		
1976 (2nd)	Hilda Koronel‡	Insiang	Insiang	
1976 (2nd)	Nora Aunor	Minsa'y isang Gamu-gamo	Corazon de la Cruz	
1977 (3rd)	Vilma Santos‡	Burlesk Queen	Chato	
1977 (3rd)	Nora Aunor	Bakya Mo Neneng	Neneng	
1978 (4th)	Nora Aunor‡ (Note: Only the "Best Performer" award was given.)	Atsay	Nelia de Leon	
1979 (5th)	Nora Aunor and Lolita Rodriguez‡	Ina Ka ng Anak Mo	Esther and Renata	

=== 1980s ===
Year	Actress	Film	Role	Ref
1980 (6th)	Amy Austria‡	Brutal	Cynthia	
1980 (6th)	Nora Aunor	Bona	Bona	
1980 (6th)	Nora Aunor	Kung Ako'y Iiwan Mo	Beatrice Alcala	
1981 (7th)	Vilma Santos‡	Karma	Sara	
1981 (7th)	Nora Aunor	Rock n' Roll		
1982 (8th)	Nora Aunor‡	Himala	Elsa	
1983 (9th)	Coney Reyes-Mumar‡	Bago Kumalat ang Kamandag		
1984 (10th)	Nora Aunor‡	Bulaklak sa City Jail	Angela Aguilar	
1985 (11th)	Vivian Velez‡	Paradise Inn	Daria	
1985 (11th)	Nora Aunor	I Can't Stop Loving You	Amy Mercado	
1986 (12th)	Liza Lorena‡	Halimaw sa Banga	Margarita	
1987 (13th)	Melanie Marquez‡	The Untold Story of Melanie Marquez	Melanie Marquez	
1988 (14th)	Amy Austria‡	Celestina Sanchez, Alyas Bubbles/ Enforcer: Ativan Gang	Bubbles Sanchez	
1989 (15th)	Vilma Santos‡	Imortal	Natalia Avila	

=== 1990s ===
Year	Actress	Film	Role	Ref
1990 (16th)	Nora Aunor‡	Andrea, Paano Ba ang Maging Isang Ina?	Andrea	
1991 (17th)	Nora Aunor‡	Ang Totoong Buhay ni Pacita M.	Pacita	
1992 (18th)	Gina Alajar‡	Shake, Rattle & Roll IV	Puri	
1993 (19th)	Dawn Zulueta‡	Kung Mawawala Ka Pa	Marissa Palma	
1993 (19th)	Nora Aunor	Inay	Sally	
1994 (20th)	Kimberly Diaz‡	Kanto Boy: Anak ni Toto Gwapo	Michelle	
1995 (21st)	Nora Aunor‡	Muling Umawit ang Puso	Loida Veranno	
1996 (22nd)	Amy Austria‡	Trudis Liit	Magna	
1997 (23rd)	Maricel Soriano‡	Nasaan ang Puso?	Joy	
1998 (24th)	Alice Dixson‡	Sambahin ang Ngalan Mo	Blanca	
1999 (25th)	Elizabeth Oropesa‡	Bulaklak ng Maynila	Azon	

=== 2000s ===
Year	Actress	Film	Role	Ref
2000 (26th)	Gloria Romero‡	Tanging Yaman	Lola Loleng	
2001 (27th)	Assunta de Rossi‡	Hubog	Vanessa	
2002 (28th)	Ara Mina‡	Mano Po	Richelle Go-Bala	
2002 (28th)	Maricel Soriano	Mano Po	Vera Go	
2002 (28th)	Joyce Jimenez	Lapu-Lapu	Bulakna	
2002 (28th)	Donita Rose	Lastikman	Linda	
2002 (28th)	Vilma Santos	Dekada '70	Amanda Bartolome	
2002 (28th)	Rufa Mae Quinto	Hula Mo, Huli Ko	Paula	
2002 (28th)	Zsa Zsa Padilla	Home Along da Riber	Sandra	
2002 (28th)	Ina Raymundo	Ang Alamat ng Lawin	Camila	
2003 (29th)	Maricel Soriano‡	Filipinas	Yolanda Filipinas	
2004 (30th)	Vilma Santos‡	Mano Po 3: My Love	Lilia	
2004 (30th)	Judy Ann Santos	Aishite Imasu 1941: Mahal Kita	Inya Marasingan Manalang/ Kapitan Berto	
2005 (31st)	Zsa Zsa Padilla‡	Mano Po 4: Ako Legal Wife	Chona Gao-Chiong	
2006 (32nd)	Judy Ann Santos‡	Kasal, Kasali, Kasalo	Angelita "Angie"	
2007 (33rd)	Maricel Soriano‡	Bahay Kubo, The Pinoy Mano Po	Eden	
2008 (34th)	Anne Curtis‡	Baler	Feliza Reyes	
2008 (34th)	Dawn Zulueta	Magkaibigan	Tere	
2008 (34th)	Maricel Laxa	Magkaibigan	Eden	
2008 (34th)	Ai-Ai delas Alas	Ang Tanging Ina N'yong Lahat	Ina	
2009 (35th)	Sharon Cuneta‡	Mano Po 6: A Mother's Love	Melinda Tan Uy	
2009 (35th)	Angelica Panganiban	I Love You, Goodbye	Lizelle Jimenez	
2009 (35th)	Cristine Reyes	Ang Darling Kong Aswang	Eliza Santos	
2009 (35th)	Iza Calzado	Ang Panday	Maria	

=== 2010s ===
Year	Actress	Film	Role	Ref
2010 (36th)	Ai Ai delas Alas‡	Ang Tanging Ina Mo (Last na 'To!)	Ina Montecillo	
2010 (36th)	Carla Abellana	Shake, Rattle and Roll 12	Dianne	
2010 (36th)	Marian Rivera	Super Inday and the Golden Bibe	Inday (Super Inday)	
2011 (37th)	Maricel Soriano‡	Yesterday, Today, Tomorrow	Mariel	
2011 (37th)	Judy Ann Santos	My Househusband (Ikaw Na!)	Mia	
2011 (37th)	Ai-Ai delas Alas	Enteng ng Ina Mo	Ina Montecillo	
2011 (37th)	Maricar Reyes	Shake, Rattle & Roll 13	Isay	
2011 (37th)	Eugene Domingo	Shake, Rattle & Roll 13	Cynthia Gomez	
2012 (38th)	Nora Aunor‡	Thy Womb	Shaleha	
2012 (38th)	Angelica Panganiban	One More Try	Jacqueline	
2012 (38th)	Angel Locsin	One More Try	Grace	
2012 (38th)	Judy Ann Santos	Si Agimat, si Enteng Kabisote at si Ako	Angelina Kalinisan-Orteza (Ako)	
2012 (38th)	Janice de Belen	Shake, Rattle and Roll Fourteen: The Invasion	Myra	
2013 (39th)	Maricel Soriano‡	Girl, Boy, Bakla, Tomboy	Pia Jackstone	
2013 (39th)	KC Concepcion	Boy Golden: Shoot to Kill	Marla "Marla Dy" De Guzman	
2013 (39th)	Eugene Domingo	Kimmy Dora: Ang Kiyemeng Prequel	Kimmy and Dora Go Dong Hae	
2013 (39th)	Kathryn Bernardo	Pagpag: Siyam na Buhay	Leni	
2013 (39th)	Bela Padilla	10,000 Hours	Maya Limchauco	
2014 (40th)	Jennylyn Mercado‡	English Only, Please	Tere Madlansacay	
2014 (40th)	Vina Morales	Bonifacio: Ang Unang Pangulo	Gregoria de Jesus / Oriang	
2014 (40th)	Erich Gonzales	Shake, Rattle & Roll XV	Sarah/Sandra	
2014 (40th)	Carla Abellana	Shake, Rattle & Roll XV	Aimee	
2015 (41st)	Jennylyn Mercado‡	Walang Forever	Mia Nolasco	
2015 (41st)	Ai-Ai delas Alas	My Bebe Love: #KiligPaMore	Corazon Tala-tala	
2015 (41st)	Meryll Soriano	Honor Thy Father	Kaye	
2015 (41st)	Jodi Sta. Maria	All You Need Is Pag-Ibig	Mel	
2016 (42nd)	Irma Adlawan‡	Oro	Kapitana	
2016 (42nd)	Eugene Domingo	Ang Babae sa Septic Tank 2: #ForeverIsNotEnough	Romina/Eugene Domingo	
2016 (42nd)	Nora Aunor	Kabisera		
2016 (42nd)	Rhed Bustamante	Seklusyon	Anghela Sta. Ana/NgaHela	
2017 (43rd)	Joanna Ampil‡	Ang Larawan	Candida Marasigan	
2017 (43rd)	Jennylyn Mercado	All of You	Gabby	
2017 (43rd)	Dawn Zulueta	Meant to Beh	Andrea Balatbat	
2017 (43rd)	Erich Gonzales	Siargao	Laura	
2018 (44th)	Gloria Romero‡	Rainbow's Sunset	Sylvia Estrella	
2018 (44th)	Kim Chiu	One Great Love	Zyra Paez	
2018 (44th)	Anne Curtis	Aurora	Leana	
2019 (45th)	Judy Ann Santos‡	Mindanao	Saima Datupalo	
2019 (45th)	Carmina Villarroel	Sunod	Olivia	
2019 (45th)	Miles Ocampo	Write About Love	Female Writer	

=== 2020s ===
Year	Actress	Film	Role	Ref
2020 (46th)	Charlie Dizon‡	Fan Girl	Jane	
2020 (46th)	Nora Aunor	Isa Pang Bahaghari	Lumen	
2020 (46th)	Iza Calzado	Tagpuan	Agnes	
2020 (46th)	Sylvia Sanchez	Coming Home	Salve Librada	
2020 (46th)	Ritz Azul	The Missing	Iris	
2021 (47th)	Charo Santos-Concio‡	Kun Maupay Man it Panahon	Norma	
2021 (47th)	Daniela Stranner	Love at First Stream	Vilma	
2021 (47th)	Alex Gonzaga	The Exorsis	Dani	
2021 (47th)	Elizabeth Oropesa	Huwag Kang Lalabas	Fides	
2022 (48th)	Nadine Lustre‡	Deleter	Lyra	
2022 (48th)	Ivana Alawi	Partners in Crime	Barbara	
2022 (48th)	Heaven Peralejo	Nanahimik ang Gabi	Me-Ann	
2022 (48th)	Toni Gonzaga	My Teacher	Emma	
2023 (49th)	Vilma Santos-Recto‡	When I Met You in Tokyo	Azon	
2023 (49th)	Eugene Domingo	Becky and Badette	Becky Naman	
2023 (49th)	Pokwang	Becky and Badette	Badette Imaculada	
2023 (49th)	Sharon Cuneta	Family of Two	Maricar	
2023 (49th)	Beauty Gonzalez	Kampon	Eileen	
2023 (49th)	Marian Rivera	Rewind	Mary	
2024 (50th)	Judy Ann Santos‡	Espantaho		
2024 (50th)	Aicelle Santos	Isang Himala	Elsa	
2024 (50th)	Francine Diaz	My Future You	Karen	
2024 (50th)	Jane de Leon	Strange Frequencies: Taiwan Killer Hospital		
2024 (50th)	Julia Montes	Topakk	Weng Diwata	
2024 (50th)	Vilma Santos	Uninvited	Lilia Capistrano / Eva Candelaria	
2025 (51st)	Krystel Go‡	I'mPerfect		
2025 (51st)	Nadine Lustre	Call Me Mother		
2025 (51st)	Bianca de Vera	Love You So Bad		
2025 (51st)	Angelica Panganiban	Unmarry		

== Multiple awards for Best Actress ==
Throughout the history of Metro Manila Film Festival (MMFF), there have been actresses who received multiple Awards for Best Actress. As of 2019 (45th MMFF), 7 actresses have received two or more Best Actress awards.

Actress	Record Set	First year awarded	Recent year awarded
Nora Aunor	8	1978	2012
Maricel Soriano	5	1997	2013
Vilma Santos	5	1977	2023
Judy Ann Santos	3	2006	2024
Amy Austria	3	1980	1996
Jennylyn Mercado	2	2014	2015
Gloria Romero	2	2000	2018
