= Lolita Rodriguez =

Filipino actress (1935–2016)

- Rodriguez in 1968
- Born: Dolores Marquez Clark; January 29, 1935; Urdaneta, Pangasinan, Philippine Islands
- Died: November 28, 2016 (aged 81); Hemet, California, U.S.
- Occupation: Actress
- Years active: 1953–1992
- Spouse: Eddie Arenas (divorced)
- Children: 3

Lolita Rodriguez (born Dolores Marquez Clark; January 29, 1935 – November 28, 2016) was a Filipino actress whose career spanned four decades. Regarded as the "Queen of Philippine Drama", she was noted for her restrained, subtle acting style and was famous for her performances in a range of film genres, from drama, comedy and action. She is a recipient of two FAMAS Awards for her portrayal in Gilda (1956) and Weighed But Found Wanting (1974).

== Career ==
In 1953, at the age of 18, she entered the movie industry. Her first movie was in Sampaguita Pictures Ating Pag-ibig (1953) starring Tita Duran and Pancho Magalona, followed by Apat Na Taga (1953), Cofradia (1953), Mr. Kasintahan (1953), Sabungera (1954), Pilya (1954) with Gloria Romero and Ric Rodrigo, Jack And Jill (1955) with Dolphy and Rogelio dela Rosa, Binibining Kalog (1955) with Ramon Revilla, Tanikalang Apoy (1955) with Paraluman, Kanto Girl (1956) with Oscar Moreno, and Alipin Ng Palad (1959) with Luis Gonzales.

She also appeared in action films including Tarhata (1957), Kilabot Sa Makiling (1959), Kapitan Lolita Limbas (1961) with Greg Martin, Eddie Garcia, Lito Legaspi and Josephine Estrada, and Diegong Tabak (1962).

After Sampaguita, she continued her work in cinema whenever a good role beckoned. At the 1968 Manila Film Festival, she was the Best Actress awardee for Kasalanan Kaya?, and also at the 1971 Catholic Mass Media Awards for Stardoom. Her most enduring achievement was starring in Lino Brocka's 1974 drama, Tinimbang Ka Ngunit Kulang.

In 1979, she performed stage play Larawan playing Candida, at Philippine Educational Theater Association (PETA). She appeared in more than 85 movies in drama, comedy and action. During the same year, she made two important films with National Artist Lino Brocka with two equally-superb actresses - Charito Solis in Ina, Kapatid, Anak and Nora Aunor in Ina Ka ng Anak Mo, an entry in the 5th Metro Manila Film Festival (MMFF). The latter screen collaboration eventually made her share the best actress award with the Superstar.

She made a screen comeback in 1985 in Amazaldy Films' Paradise Inn, an entry in 10th MMMF, sharing equal billing with Vivian Velez. In 1991, she did a movie-made-for-television entitled, Lucia directed by Mel Chionglo.

== Personal life ==
She is daughter of an American father, William Charles Clark, and a Filipino mother, Carmen Marquez. Rodriguez was born in Urdaneta, Pangasinan. She married, and later divorced Eddie Arenas, also from Sampaguita Pictures. They have three children: Maria Dolores (Birdie), Eduardo Jr. (Bogey), and Maria Carmen (Par). All three are married with families of their own. The singer, Radha, is Bogey's oldest daughter. Rodriguez and her children migrated to the US in 1977 to be with her mother and siblings.

== Death ==
Rodriguez died of stroke on November 28, 2016, aged 81, at her home in Hemet, California.

== Acting credits ==
=== Stage ===
Year	Production	Role	Venue	Ref(s)
1979	Larawan	Candida	Dulaang Raha Sulayman, Fort Santiago	

=== Film ===
Gloria Romero's film credits
Year	Title	Role	Notes	Ref(s)
1953	Ang Ating Pag-ibig			
1953	Cofradia			
1954	Pilya			
1954	Jack and Jill	Benita		
1954	Dumagit			
1955	Sa Dulo ng Landas			
1955	Batas ng Alipin			
1955	Binibining Kalog	Eloisa		
1956	Gilda			
1957	Sino Ang Maysala?	Lolita		
1957	Mga Anak ng Diyos	Caridad		
1957	Veronica			
1957	Gabi at Araw			
1957	Busabos			
1958	Talipandas			
1958	Condemned			
1959	Pitong Pagsisisi			
1959	Kilabot sa Makiling	Lilian		
1960	Lupa sa Lupa	Sofia		
1960	Laura	Laura		
1961	Nakasakdal sa Langit			
1961	4 Yugto ng Buhay			
1961	Octavia	Octavia		
1961	Halik sa Lupa			
1962	The Big Broadcast			
1962	Diegong Tabak			
1964	Andres Bonifacio Ang Supremo			
1964	Sa Bilis, Walang Kaparis			
1964	From Tokyo with Love			
1967	Kapag Puso'y Sinugatan			
1970	Dipped in Gold	Emma		
1971	Stardoom	Toyang		
1974	Weighed But Found Wanting	Kuala		
1974	Happy Days Are Here Again	Herself		
1974	Three, Two, One	Rosenda		
1976	Mortal	Anino		
1976	Lunes, Martes, Miyerkules, Huwebes, Biyernes, Sabado, Linggo			
1979	Ina, Kapatid, Anak	Pura Villasenor de los Santos		
1979	Ina Ka ng Anak Mo	Renata		
1985	Paradise Inn	Ester		
1992	Lucia	Lucia	The film was made for the 1992 London International Environmental Film Festival, for which it won "Best Film".	

== Accolades ==
Awards and nominations received by Lolita Rodriguez
Organizations	Year	Recipient	Category	Result	Ref.
Citizen Council for Mass Media Awards	1971	Stardoom	Best Actress	Won	
Eastwood City Walk of Fame	2006	Lolita Rodriguez	Inductee	Honored	
FAMAS Awards	1955	Jack and Jill	Best Actress	Nominated	
FAMAS Awards	1956	Rosana	Best Actress	Nominated	
FAMAS Awards	1957	Gilda	Best Actress	Won	
FAMAS Awards	1958	Busabos	Best Actress	Nominated	
FAMAS Awards	1959	Condenado	Best Actress	Nominated	
FAMAS Awards	1960	Kilabot sa Makiling	Best Actress	Nominated	
FAMAS Awards	1963	Pitong Kabanalan ng Isang Makasalanan	Best Actress	Nominated	
FAMAS Awards	1964	Sapagkat Kami'y Tao Lamang	Best Actress	Nominated	
FAMAS Awards	1965	Andres Bonifacio: Ang Supremo	Best Actress	Nominated	
FAMAS Awards	1966	Iginuhit sa Buhangin	Best Actress	Nominated	
FAMAS Awards	1967	Dugo ang Kulay ng Pag-ibig	Best Actress	Nominated	
FAMAS Awards	1969	Kasalanan Kaya?	Best Actress	Nominated	
FAMAS Awards	1970	Ikaw	Best Actress	Nominated	
FAMAS Awards	1971	Tubog sa Ginto	Best Actress	Nominated	
FAMAS Awards	1972	Stardoom	Best Actress	Nominated	
FAMAS Awards	1975	Tinimbang Ka Ngunit Kulang	Best Actress	Won	
Gawad Parangal sa mga Ginintuang Bituin ng Pelikulang Pilipino	2010	Lolita Rodriguez	Honoree	Won	
Gawad Urian	1977	Lunes, Martes, Miyerkules, Huwebes, Biyernes, Sabado, Linggo	Best Actress	Nominated	
Gawad Urian	1980	Ina Ka ng Anak Mo	Best Actress	Nominated	
Gawad Urian	1986	Paradise Inn	Best Actress	Nominated	
Luna Awards	2017	Lolita Rodriguez	Lamberto Avellana Memorial Award	Honored	
Manila Film Festival	1968	Kasalanan Kaya?	Best Actress	Won	
Metro Manila Film Festival	1979	Ina Ka ng Anak Mo	Best Actress	Won	
