= Patayin Sa Sindak Si Barbara =

Patayin Sa Sindak Si Barbara may refer to:

- Patayin Mo Sa Sindak Si Barbara, a 1974 Filipino film
- Patayin sa Sindak si Barbara (1995 film), a remake of the 1974 film
- Patayin sa Sindak si Barbara (TV series), a Filipino TV series based on the 1974 film
