= 1974 FAMAS Awards =

Annual Filipino film awards ceremony

22nd FAMAS Awards
- Date: 1974
- Site: Manila Hilton Hotel, Philippines

Highlights
- Best Picture: Nueva Vizcaya ~ Rosal Productions
- Most awards: Lalaki.. Kasalanan Mo; Dalawang Mukha ng Tagumpay (3 wins)

The 22nd Filipino Academy of Movie Arts and Sciences Awards Night was held in 1974 at the Manila Hilton Hotel. This ceremony recognized outstanding achievements in the Filipino movies made in the year 1973.

Nueva Vizcaya of Rosa Film won the most coveted FAMAS Award for Best Picture including the best Supporting Actor Award for Eddie Garcia. It was also the first time in the history of FAMAS that a Father & son and Mother & daughter won an acting award. Ramon Revilla for best actor and Marlon Bautista for best child actor for the film Hulihin si Tyagong Akyat and Gloria Sevilla for best actress and her daughter Nadia Veloso(Suzette Ranillo) for Best Supporting actress for the movie Gimingaw AKo.

== Awards ==
=== Major Awards ===
Winners are listed first and highlighted with boldface.

Best Picture	Best Director
**Nueva Vizcaya — Rosal Productions**; Erap is My Guy — JE Productions; Esteban — FPJ Productions; Lalaki, Kasalan mo — Virgo Film Productions; Ang Mahiwagang Daigdig ni Pedo Penduko — Topaz Film Productions; Paru-Parong Itim — NV Productions; Tanikalang Dugo — Lea Productions	**Jun Raquiza — Dalawang Mukha ng Tagumpay**; Augusto Buenaventura — Erap is My Guy; Celso Ad Castillo — Esteban; Armando De Guzman — Hindi na Sisikat ang Araw; Eddie Rodriguez — Lalaki, Kasalanan Mo; Pablo Santiago — Nueva Vizcaya; George Rowe — Parung-parung Itim
Best Actor	Best Actress
**Ramon Revilla — Hulihin si Tiagong Akyat**; Joseph Estrada — Erap is my Guy; Zaldy Zshornack — Hindi na Sisikat ang Araw; Eddie Rodriguez — Lalaki, Kasalanan MO; Ramon Zamora — Ang Mahiwagang Daigdig ni Pedro Penduko; Vic Vargas — Nueva Vizcaya; Dindo Fernando — Panic	**Gloria Sevilla — Gimingaw Ako**; Nora Aunor — Paru-parung Itim; Susan Roces — Hanggang sa Kabila ng Daigdig: The Tony Maiquez Story; Alona Alegre — Kung Bakit Dugo ang Kulay ng Gabi; Amalia Fuentes — Pag-ibig mo, Buhay Ko; Boots Anson-Roa — Tanikalang Dugo
Best Supporting Actor	Best Supporting Actress
**Eddie Garcia — Nueva Vizcaya**; Max Alvarado — Esteban; Chia-Bee Tan — Kung-fu Showdown; Panchito — Ang mahiwagang Daigdig ni Pedro Penduko; Subas Herrero — Panic!; Vic Vargas — Paru-parung Itim; Ruben Rustia — Tanikalang Dugo	**Suzette Ranillo — Gimingaw Ako**; Lotis Key — Dalawang Mukha ng Tagumpay; Rosemarie Gil — Florinda; Anna Gonzales — Hindi na sisikat ang Araw; Caridad Sanchez — Lupang Hinirang; Pinky de Leon — Tanikalang Dugo
Best Child Actor	Best Child Actress
**Marlon Bautista — Hulihin si Tiaging Akyat**; Dondon Nakar. — Binhi; Frankie Navaja Jr. — Gimingaw Ako	**Jingle — Lalaki, Kasalanan Mo**; Snooky Serna — Gigi; Sharon Manabat— Hindi na Sisikat ang Araw; Lorna Tolentino — Pag-ibig mo, Buhay Ko
Best in Screenplay	Best Story
**Augusto Buenaventura — Erap is my Guy**	**Louise de Mesa — Lalaki, Kasalanan Mo**
Best Sound Engineering	Best Musical Score
**Angel Avellana — Hanggang sa Kabila ng Daigdig**	**Manuel Franco — Hanggang sa Kabila ng Daigdig**
Best Cinematography (black and White)	Best Cinematography (Colored)
**Higino Fallorina — Lalaki, Kasalanan Mo**	**Felipe Sacdalan — Dalawang Mukha ny Tagumpay**
Best Editing	Best Production Design
**Ben Barcelon — Dalawang Mukha ng Tagumpay**	**— Lupang Hinirang**

=== Special Awardee ===
- **FAMAS Lifetime Achievement Award**
  - **Imelda Marcos**

- **POSTHUMOUS Award**
  - **Vic Pacia**

- **Lou Salvador Sr. Memorial Award**
  - **Katy de la Cruz**
- **Gregorio Valdez Memorial Award**
  - **Guillermo de la Vega**

- **Don Ciriaco Santiago Memorial Award**
  - **Joseph Estrada**
