= Ike Lozada =

Filipino comedian, actor and TV host (1943–1995)

- Born: Enrique Tagle Lozada; July 5, 1943; Iloilo City, Philippines
- Died: March 8, 1995 (aged 51); Quezon City, Philippines
- Other names: Kuya Ike, Ike, Iking
- Occupations: Actor; comedian; host
- Years active: 1951–1994
- Known for: Big Ike, Dambuhalang DJ

Enrique Tagle Lozada (July 5, 1943 – March 8, 1995), also known as Kuya Ike or Iking, was a Filipino actor, comedian, and television host.

== Early life ==
Lozada was born on July 7, 1943, in Iloilo City. He was 2nd of brood of 4, he is the son of the late Jose Lozada, Sr. He started acting at the age of 11 on the movie Mga Bituin ng Kinabukasan with the younger Susan Roces.

== Death ==
He died on March 8, 1995, in Manila of a heart attack at the Quezon City Medical Center. He was 51. His remains were laid to rest at the Manila Memorial Park in Parañaque.

== Filmography ==
=== Film ===
- Mga Bituin ng Kinabukasan (1954)
- Tawag ng Tanghalan (1958)
- Strangers in the Night (1966)
- Langit Pa Rin Kita (1967)
- Sons of the Lo' Waist Gang (1967)
- Bertang Palengke (1967)
- Shing-A-Ling-A-Loo, Pretty Girl (1967)
- Somebody Cares (1967)
- Way Out in the Country (1967)
- Top Ten (1967)
- Goin' to A-Go-Go (1967)
- Shake-a-Boom! (Naghalo ang Balat sa Tinalupan) (1967)
- Mash K' Pops (1967)
- Sitting in the Park (1967)
- Let's Do the Psychedelic '68 (1967)
- The More I See You (1968)
- Talents Unlimited (1968)
- Summer Love (1968)
- Sideshow '69 (1968)
- Kailanma'y di ka Mag-iisa (1968)
- Boogaloo (1968)
- Bakit Kita Inibig? (1968)
- Bahay Kubo, Kahit Munti (1968)
- Arista ang aking Asawa (1968)
- Young Girl (1969)
- Teenage Escapades! (1969)
- Pa-Bandying-Bandying (1969)
- Our Man Duling (1969)
- Oh, Delilah (1969)
- Karate Showdown (1969)
- Halina Neneng Ko (1969)
- Fiesta Extravaganza (1969)
- Drakulita (1969)
- Cuatro Vendetta (1969)
- Banda 24 (1969)
- Ang Kawatan (1969)
- 9 Teeners (1969)
- Tisoy (1969)
- D' Musical Teenage Idols! (1969)
- Young Love (1970)
- Three for the Road (1970)
- Pen-Pen (1970)
- Orang (1970)
- I Dream of Nora (1970)
- Haydee (1970)
- Happy Hippie Holiday (1970)
- Your Love (1970)
- The Young at Heart (1970)
- Nora in Wonderland (1970)
- Hey There, Lonely Girl (1970)
- The Sensations (1971)
- Sweet Caroline (1971)
- Make Laugh, Not War (1971)
- Guy and Pip (1971)
- Fiesta Extravaganza '71 (1971)
- Jesus Christ Superstar (1972)
- Si Dyesebel at ang Mahiwagang Kabibe (1973)
- Fight Batman Fight! (1973)
- Supergirl (1973)
- Oh Margie Oh (1974)
- Darna and the Giants (1974) (as a Giant)
- Memories of Our Love (1975)
- Relaks Lang Mama, Sagot Kita (1976)
- Fantastika vs. Wonderwoman (1976)
- Mr. Wong and the Bionic Girls (1977)
- Wonder Dabiana (1978)
- Gorgonya (1978) (as Bekya)
- Sabi Barok Lab Ko Dabiana (1978)
- Tomcat (1979)
- They Call Him Bruce Lee (1979)
- Tatay na Barok (1979)
- Isa, Dalawa, Tatlo, Ang Tatay Kong Kalbo (1979)
- Anak ng Atsay (1979)
- Roberta (1979)
- High School Circa '65 (1979)
- Sunnyboy und Sugarbaby (1979)
- Cola, Candy, Chocolate (1979) (as hotel chef Juanto)
- Si Gorio at ang Damong Ligaw (1979)
- Max en Jess (1979)
- Six Million Centavo Man (1980)
- Reyna ng Pitong Gatang (1980)
- Pompa (1980)
- Juan Tamad Junior (1980)
- Hepe (1980)
- Darna at Ding (1980)
- Kape't Gatas (1980)
- Rocky Tu-log (1981)
- Ibalik ang Swerti (1981)
- Burgis (1981)
- Palengke Queen (1982)
- D'Wild Wild Weng (1982)
- Tatlo Silang Tatay Ko (1982)
- Give Me Five! (1984) (as Facundo)
- Anak ni Waray vs Anak ni Biday (1984)
- Charot (1984)
- I Won, I Won (Ang S'werte Nga Naman) (1985)
- Bakit Naglaho ang Magdamag? (1986)
- Payaso (1986) (as Tomasito Bakito)
- Mga Lahing Pikutin (1987)
- Ready!.. Aim!.. Fire!.. (1987)
- Family Tree (1987)
- Leroy Leroy Sinta (1988) (as Don Agaton)
- Kambal Tuko (1988)
- Wake Up Little Susie (1988)
- One Two Bato, Three Four Bapor (1988)
- Pardina at ang Mga Duwende (1989) (as Celestino)
- Working Students (1990)
- Ano Ba 'Yan (1992) (as Fonso)
- Eh, Kasi Bata (1992)
- Mama's Boys (1993)
- Ano Ba 'Yan 2 (1993) (as Fonso)

=== Television ===
- Big Ike's Happening (1973–1984)
- GMA Supershow (1983–1986)
- Talents Unlimited (1986–1987)
- That's Entertainment (1986–1995)
- Good Morning Showbiz (1988–1989)
- A Star Is Born (1992–1993)
