= 1975 FAMAS Awards =

Annual Filipino awards for achievements in film

23rd FAMAS Awards
- Date: 1975
- Site: Philippines

Highlights
- Best Picture: Tinimbang ka Ngunit Kulang ~ CineManila Corporation
- Most awards: Tinimbang ka Ngunit Kulang ~ CineManila Corporation ( 6 wins)
- Most nominations: Tinimbang ka Ngunit Kulang ~ CineManila Corporation; Isang gabi... Tatlong babae ~ Juan de La Cruz Productions( 8 nominations )

The 22nd Filipino Academy of Movie Arts and Sciences Awards Night was held in 1975. This ceremony gave recognition to the movies that were made in the year 1974.

The year 1974 was a banner year for the Philippine movie industry, producing quality movies like Tinimbang Ka Ngunit Kulang, Tatlo, Dalawa, Isa; Ang Pinakamagandang Hayop sa Balat ng Lupa, Alala Mo, Daigdig; Fe, Esperanza, Caridad, John en Marsha; and Patayin Mo Sa Sindak Si Barbara.

During the awarding ceremony of FAMAS 1975, Tinimbang Ka Ngunit Kulang became the second Filipino movie to win 4 major awards including the most coveted FAMAS Award for Best Picture, Best Director, Best Actor, Best Actress but it failed to win in the best screenplay category.

== Awards ==
=== Major Awards ===
Winners are listed first and highlighted with boldface.

Best Picture	Best Director
**Tinimbang ka Ngunit Kulang — CineManila Corporation**; Ala-ala mo, daigdig ko— Virgo Film Productions; Batingaw — Virgo Film Productions; Isang gabi... Tatlong babae! — Juan de la Cruz Productions; Kapitan Eddie Set — Imus Productions; Manila Connection — JE Productions; The Pacific Connection — Nepomuceno Productions; Ang Pinakamagandang Hayop sa Balat ng Lupa — Gemini Films International; Patayin Mo Sa Sindak Si Barbara — Rosas Productions	**Lino Brocka — Tinimbang Ka Ngunit Kulang**; Eddie Rodriguez — Ala-ala mo, Daigdig ko; Pablo Santiago — Batingaw; Elwood Perez — Isang Gabi... Tatlong Babae; June Raquiza — Krimen: Kayo ang Humatol; Cesar Gallardo — Manila Connection; Cirio H. Santiago — The Pacific Connection; Celso Ad Castillo — Ang Pinakamagandang Hayop sa Balat ng Lupa; Joey Gosiengfiao — Sunugin ang Samar
Best Actor	Best Actress
**Christopher de Leon — Tinimbang ka Ngunit Kulang**; Eddie Rodriguez — Ala-ala mo, Daigdig ko; Ronaldo Valdez — Fe, Esperanza, Caridad; Dolphy — John en Marsha; June Raquiza — Krimen: Kayo ang Humatol; Joseph Estrada — Manila Connection; Lito Anzures — Ang Pinakamagandang Hayop sa Balat ng Lupa; Vic Vargas — Huwag Tularan: Pito ang Asawa ko; Ramon Revilla — Sunugin ang Samar; George Estregan — Ugat	**Lolita Rodriguez — Tinimbang ka Ngunit Kulang**; Nora Aunor — Fe, Esperanza, Caridad; Boots Anson-Roa — Isang gabi... Tatlong babae; Amalia Fuentes — Isang gabi... Tatlong babae; Pilar Pilapil — Isang gabi... Tatlong babae; Gina Pareño — Krimen: Kayo ang Humatol; Rosemarie Sonora — Manila Connection; Susan Roces — Patayin sa Sindak si Barbara; Gloria Diaz — Ang Pinakamagandang Hayop sa Balat ng Lupa; Pinky de Leon — Ugat
Best Supporting Actor	Best Supporting Actress
**Van de León — Batingaw**; Ray Marcos — Isang gabi... Tatlong babae; Tommy Abuel — La Paloma: Ang Kalapating Ligaw; Mario Escudero — Ang Pinakamagandang Hayop sa Balat ng Lupa; Orlando Nadres — Huwag Tularan: Pito ang Asawa ko!; Paquito Diaz — Return of the Dragon; Michael Murray — Sunugin ang Samar; Mario O'Hara — Tinimbang ka Ngunit Kulang	**Anita Linda — Tatlo, Dalawa, Isa**; Mary Walter — Ala-ala Mo, daigdig ko; Rossana Ortiz — Batingaw; Marissa Delgado — Isang gabi... Tatlong babae; Marianne dela Riva — Krimen: Kayo ang Humatol; Anna Gonzales — Manila Connection; Babsy Paredes — Ang Pinakamagandang Hayop sa Balat ng Lupa; Laurice Guillen — ''Tinimbang ka Ngunit Kulang
Best Child Actor	Best Child Actress
**Angelito — Isang gabi... Tatlong babae**	**Beth Malongat — Patayin sa Sindak si Barbara**
Best in Screenplay	Best Story
**Orlando Nandres — Tatlo, dalawa, Isa**	**Orlando Nandres, Angelo Barrios, Tony Perez — Lalaki, Kasalanan Mo**
Best Sound	Best Musical Score
**Angel Avellana — Ang Pinakamagandang Haypop sa Balat ng Lupa**	**Lutgardo Labad — Tinimbang ka Ngunit Kulang**
Best Cinematography	Best Special Effects
**Higino Fallorina, Felipe Sacdalan — Krimen: Kayo ang Humatol**	**— Patayin sa Sindak si Barbara**
Best Editing	Best Production Design
**Ben Barcelon — Krimen: Kayo ang Humatol**	**— Krimen: Kayo ang Humatol**
Best in Theme Song	
**Emmanuel Lacaba — "Awit ni Kuala" from the movie "Tinimbang ka Ngunit Kulang"**	—
