= Patayin sa Sindak si Barbara (1995 film) =

Film by Chito S. Roño

- Theatrical release poster
- Directed by: Chito S. Roño
- Screenplay by: Ricardo Lee
- Story by: Celso Ad. Castillo
- Based on: Patayin Mo sa Sindak si Barbara (1974) by Celso Ad. Castillo
- Produced by: Charo Santos-Concio; Malou N. Santos; Simon C. Ongpin; Lily Y. Monteverde
- Starring: Lorna Tolentino; Dawn Zulueta; Tonton Gutierrez; Antoinette Taus
- Cinematography: Joe Batac
- Edited by: Jess Navarro
- Music by: Jessie Lasaten
- Distributed by: Star Cinema
- Release date: July 12, 1995
- Running time: 93 minutes
- Country: Philippines
- Language: Filipino

Patayin sa Sindak si Barbara (transl. "Frighten Barbara to Death") is a 1995 Filipino psychological horror film directed by Chito S. Roño and written by Ricardo Lee. A remake of the 1974 film by Celso Ad. Castillo, the film stars Lorna Tolentino, Dawn Zulueta, Tonton Gutierrez, and Antoinette Taus, with other cast includes Amy Austria, Nonie Buencamino, and Angie Ferro, who appeared in the original material. The film follows a woman who is haunted by a vengeful spirit after the mysterious death of her sister, forcing her to confront long-buried family secrets.

Produced and distributed by Star Cinema Productions, the film was theatrically released on July 12, 1995.

== Plot ==
Being the loving older sister, Barbara has always been overly indulgent of her little sister Ruth's every whim. Years later, Barbara meets and instantly falls in love with Nick, who is mutually smitten with her. But the spoiled Ruth confesses to Barbara that she too is in love with Nick and threatens to kill herself if he does not marry her. Barbara reluctantly and passively accommodates Ruth's demands and convinces Nick to court her younger sister instead. In a twisted act of devotion, Nick reluctantly agrees to marry Ruth, to prove his love for Barbara. After the wedding, Barbara then decides to start a new life abroad to move on and give Nick a chance to truly fall in love with Ruth.

Sometime later, Barbara is informed that her younger sister has killed herself, with her only daughter Karen as a witness. Barbara immediately returns to the Philippines to mourn her sister and comfort her unstable niece. But strange events happen upon Barbara's return and she learns the reason surrounding Ruth's mysterious death.

Throughout their marriage, Ruth felt that Nick never really loved her, but instead harbored feelings for Barbara. In a state of paranoid delusion, she suspects that Nick is having an affair and uses his business trips to the United States as an excuse to rendezvous with Barbara. In a jealous rage, she commits suicide by stabbing herself with a large single piece of the broken mirror and haunts the household and everyone she deems who has wronged her. Before dying at their home, she curses her husband Nick for his infidelity and wants to get back at him and his other woman while she strictly tells her daughter Karen not to cry and she's not going to die on her deathbed. It was later revealed that ever since Barbara left her for the US, she indulged herself in everything that could ease her helplessness which includes witchcraft and the occult. Through this, she learns that even after death she can return to the world of the living on a limited time to haunt and exact revenge.

Maestra Beatriz, whom Barbara sought advice and also was responsible for teaching Ruth black magic tries to make contact with Ruth together with Barbara and her maid Arlene in a séance. During this séance, Ruth possesses Karen and mortally wounds Beatriz, who manages to drive away Ruth's spirit. All seems well until Barbara and Nick learn that what happened during Barbara's encounter with Ruth's spirit was only temporary, and now, since it was the 9th day since Ruth's death, she has grown more powerful with the help of evil spirits.

While both Barbara and Karen are spending their vacation at the family's resort, Maestra Beatriz's apprentice, Sofia visits Nick at the hospital and warns him to get prepared for the worst by joining forces, and this is about his late wife Ruth after Maestra Beatriz had risked her own life to drive away her spirit temporarily, they were misinformed about it being the 9th day since Ruth's death, and it was actually the 11th day, causing them to go to the family's resort to rescue them both since Ruth is becoming more dangerous due to her growing power aided by the evil spirits and they will come for Barbara. Ruth possesses Karen who attempted to kill Barbara with a kitchen knife that grazed her right arm and she knocks her yaya Benita when she blocks her way to defend Barbara and she gets the other knife to stop the possessed Karen by knife point. Barbara argues with Ruth over her spoiled nature and wants to have her own life rather than loving her and using Karen for her evil purposes due to her malevolent heart and does not know how to love everyone else throughout most of her life. Ruth continues to possess Karen after tricking Barbara. She finally reveals that she had never loved her daughter because she had inherited her father's blood, claiming this as a curse and choosing her as a way to get revenge on both her and Nick by slashing her left arm twice with a bladed tip of her knife only to be stopped by Barbara who managed to free Karen from being possessed by her mother's spirit using a holy prayer and both escape the villa.

Ruth appears and manages to convince Barbara to join her in hell despite Karen trying to stop her mother from taking her aunt, but to no avail when Ruth displays her power to cause a single fissure with flames to block away her daughter in fear while threatening her to think she had loved her dearly and Barbara tells Karen to run which she successfully did while finding someone to rescue them until her brief reunion with her father Nick. Sofia tells Nick that he is the one who can stop Ruth and goes alone to rescue Barbara while she, along with Karen, Bidoy, and Arlene, decides to find her yaya Benita. Arriving in hell, Ruth convinces Barbara for the last time who is now hesitant and afraid to join with her as she attempts to drag her into hell until Nick arrives just in time to stop his wife and instead sacrifices himself by holding the physical manifestation of Ruth stating that he tried so hard to be with her and he couldn't find peace and plunging with her to hell. Barbara calls Nick in anguish when they both fall into the sea of flames below in an explosion that also forms a fire pillar that knocks Barbara to the ground and the scream of thousands of people can be heard. The sea of flames in hell disappears when Barbara is now mourning over Nick's noble sacrifice. Barbara was last seen with Karen, Sofia, Benita, Arlene, and her husband Bidoy on the motorboat who were now leaving the family resort safely at sunrise.

== Cast ==
=== Main roles ===
- Lorna Tolentino as Barbara
- Dawn Zulueta as Ruth S. Duarte
- Tonton Gutierrez as Nick Duarte
- Antoinette Taus as Karen Duarte
- Anita Linda as Yaya Benita
- Amy Austria as Arlene
- Nonie Buencamino as Bidoy
- Angie Ferro as Maestra Beatriz

=== Supporting roles ===
- Eva Aquino as Sofia
- Ernie Zarate as Priest
- Augusto Victa as Lawyer
- Cris Daluz as Bangkero
- Kimberly Pagaduan Cabral as Dawn's Double

== Production ==
Patayin sa Sindak si Barbara is Jessie Lasaten's first musical score for Star Cinema, for which he would eventually become its resident composer.

The majority of the visual effects used in the film were handled by Cinevideo Arts Philippines. Digital compositing was handled by Video Post.

== Restoration ==
As part of the projects of the ABS-CBN Film Archives, the movie is one of the classic Filipino films that were digitally restored and remastered in HD. A special screening of the restored HD version of the film was held on April 6, 2016, at the UP Cine Adarna. When it was reuploaded in their Youtube channel in November 2025, any violent scenes including suicide and harsh language during the entire movie were cut and was later zoomed to cut off where Karen wields a kitchen knife to kill Maestra Beatriz and later attempts to kill Barbara while in Ruth's possession as well as Nick's noble sacrifice at the climax of the movie where both he and Ruth fall into the sea of flames below in an explosion was explicitly cut. Their main reasons of cutting the violent scenes from the movie is due to censorship.

== See also ==
- Patayin Mo sa Sindak si Barbara, a 1974 Filipino film
- Patayin sa Sindak si Barbara (TV series), a Filipino TV series based on the 1974 film
