= Tag-araw, Tag-ulan =

1992 drama film by Celso Ad Castillo

- Official movie poster
- Directed by: Celso Ad. Castillo
- Screenplay by: Amado Lacuesta Jr.; Ronald Carballo
- Story by: Amado Lacuesta Jr.
- Produced by: William C. Leary
- Starring: Dina Bonnevie; Gary Estrada
- Cinematography: Loreto Isleta
- Edited by: Edgardo Vinarao
- Music by: Jaime Fabregas
- Production company: Viva Films
- Distributed by: Viva Films
- Release date: July 29, 1992
- Running time: 105 minutes
- Country: Philippines
- Language: Filipino

Tag-araw, Tag-ulan is a 1992 Philippine drama film directed by Celso Ad. Castillo and written by Amado Lacuesta Jr. and Ronald Carballo from Lacuesta's story concept. It stars Dina Bonnevie and Gary Estrada.

== Plot ==
A woman who was running away from the pain of a broken love affair. A young man who was looking forward to a fun filled summer and his first mating experience.

== Cast ==
- Dina Bonnevie as Jessie
- Gary Estrada as Roy
- Jenny Roa as Malou
- Mark Gil as Richie
- Suzanne Gonzales as Teresa
- Mutya Crisostomo as Mercy
- Jigo Garcia as Jeffrey
- Chuckie Dreyfus as Bunso
- Roy de Guzman as Maning

== Awards ==
Year	Awards	Category	Recipient	Result	Ref.
1993	17th Gawad Urian Award	Best Cinematography	Loreto Isleta	Nominated	
1993	17th Gawad Urian Award	Best Editing	Edgardo Vinarao	Nominated	
1993	17th Gawad Urian Award	Best Sound	Vic Macamay	Nominated	
1993	4th YCC Awards	Best Achievement in Cinematography and Visual Design	Loreto Isleta; Raymond Bajarias	Won	
1993	4th YCC Awards	Best Achievement in Sound and Aural Orchestration	Jaime Fabregas; Vic Macamay	Nominated	
1993	42nd FAMAS Awards	Best Cinematography	Loreto Isleta	Won	
