= Mga Bituin ng Kinabukasan =

1952 Philippine drama film

The Stars of Tomorrow
- Directed by: José Nepomuceno
- Produced by: José Nepomuceno
- Starring: Ike Lozada; Susan Roces
- Distributed by: Nepomuceno Productions
- Release date: January 21, 1952
- Country: Philippines
- Languages: Filipino; English

Mga Bituin ng Kinabukasan (lit. "The Stars of Tomorrow") is a 1952 Philippine drama film. It is a story about orphaned children who seek the love of parents. Directed by José Nepomuceno, it stars Ike Lozada and Susan Roces in her first film, where she played an 11-year-old orphan girl.
