= Supergirl (1973 film) =

- Directed by: Howard Petersen
- Written by: Leni Gen Pabalan
- Cinematography: F. Pagsisihan
- Music by: D. Velasquez
- Production company: Prima Productions
- Release date: September 23, 1973
- Country: Philippines
- Language: Filipino
- Budget: ₱500,000

Supergirl is a 1973 Filipino superhero film directed by Howard Petersen. The film stars Pinky Montilla as the titular superhero. The film is based on the DC Comics character of the same name.

== Cast ==
- Pinky Montilla as Neneng / Supergirl
- Walter Navarro
- Barbara Perez
- Liza Lorena
- Nick Romano
- Ike Lozada
- Mildred Ortega
- Jhoanna Garcia
- Cloyd Robinson
- Odette Khan
- Enrico Villa
- Bernard Calaguas
- Max Rojo
- Cita del Rosario
- Rodin Rodriguez
- Tanay Boys stuntmen

== Story ==
Neneng (Pinky Montilla) together with blind elder sister (Mildred Ortega) and kid brother live in a coastal town frequented by pirates. After invasion of pirates one night which got townfolks' belongings, Neneng was given a ring by a fairy (Barbara Perez). The ring afforded her to transform to Supergirl which enabled her to fly and have superpowers. Meanwhile, a mad scientist (Odette Khan) and her daughter (Djohanna Garcia) settled in the same town with the prospect of bringing back to life dead people including Cesar (Walter Navarro), her daughter's boyfriend. Experimenting first on a dead frog, the scientist thought that her experiment was a failure. But the frog didn't just come back to life, it also grew to an enormous size. The giant frog wreaks havoc on the townsfolk, but Supergirl came to the rescue. Many people died including her blind sister and fiancé (Nick Romano). One time, Cesar came back to life and walked out of the scientist's house and reached Neneng's house. The girlfriend and the mom-scientist followed immediately and made a scene. The townfolks surrounded them and plan to kill both of them but were able to secure themselves in their house. This made the scientist very mad and vowed revenge by bringing back to life the dead people of the town to kill the living. Supergirl was able to stop all of them, including the mad scientist in a duel atop the church.
