= Fe, Esperanza, Caridad =

- Movie Poster
- Directed by: Cirio H. Santiago (segment "Fe"); Lamberto V. Avellana (segment "Esperanza"); Gerardo de Leon (segment "Caridad")
- Screenplay by: Donato Valentin (segment "Esperanza"); Rino Bermudez (segment "Esperanza"); Ka Ikong (segment "Caridad"); Jojo Lapus (segment "Caridad"); Gerardo de Leon (segment "Caridad")
- Story by: Donato Valentin (segment "Esperanza"); Rino Bermudez (segment "Esperanza"); Gerardo de Leon (segment "Caridad")
- Produced by: Digna Santiago; Danilo Santiago
- Starring: Nora Aunor
- Cinematography: Ricardo M. David (segment "Caridad"); Justo Paulino (segment "Esperanza")
- Edited by: Edgardo Vinarao; Ben Barcelon
- Music by: Tito Arevalo (segment "Caridad"); Tito Sotto (segment "Esperanza")
- Production company: Premiere Productions
- Release date: April 10, 1974
- Country: Philippines
- Language: Filipino

Fe, Esperanza, Caridad (transl. Faith, Hope and Charity) is a 1974 Filipino film, produced by Premiere Productions. It is a trilogy featuring Nora Aunor giving life to the stories of three women: Fe—an emerging movie superstar who has an invalid husband—, Esperanza—a young wife living in a middle-class neighborhood in the city—and Caridad—a young novice who was seduced by the devil himself.

The film was directed by three acclaimed directors namely Cirio H. Santiago and two National Artists for Film; Gerardo de Leon and Lamberto V. Avellana.

== Synopsis ==
=== Caridad (Third Segment) ===
Caridad ("Charity") (Nora Aunor), a nun who loves Rodrigo (Ronaldo Valdez), the gardener in the convent. Caridad is experiencing a complex feeling of a woman fighting for the love she for Rodrigo and her vow as a nun. When Caridad discovered that Rodrigo and Satan are the same entity, Rodrigo made her life like hell. Although repugnant, Caridad continued dealing with Rodrigo in the hope that she could convince him to return to the Lord. In return for that plea, Caridad will do anything, even jump off the cliff.

== Cast ==
=== Fe ===
- Nora Aunor as Fe
- Dindo Fernando as Tony Artiaga
- Ruben Rustia as Don Benito

=== Esperanza ===
- Nora Aunor as Esperanza
- Jay Ilagan as Doming
- Divina Valencia as Aling Vina
- Bert LeRoy Jr. as Vic
- Rosa Aguirre as Aling Rosa
- Romy Lapus as Boyet
- Rino Bermudez as Mang Inggo

=== Caridad ===
- Nora Aunor as Caridad
- Ronaldo Valdez as Rodrigo/Satan
- Patria Plata as Mother Superior
- Subas Herrero as Demon
- Laurice Guillen as Marta

== Recognition ==
Year	Group	Category	Nominee	Result
1975	23rd FAMAS Awards	Best Actress	Nora Aunor	Nominated
1975	23rd FAMAS Awards	Best Actor	Ronaldo Valdez	Nominated
1975	23rd FAMAS Awards	Best Supporting Actor	Ruben Rustia	Nominated
