= Kamao =

1987 television documentary film

- Genre: Action
- Directed by: Celso Ad. Castillo
- Starring: Fernando Poe Jr.; Celso Ad. Castillo; Mary Walter; Rachel Ann Wolfe
- Country of origin: Philippines
- Original language: Filipino

Production
- Production companies: Kapisanan ng mga Artista ng Pelikulang Pilipino; Multi-TeleVentures, Inc.

Original release
- Network: Radio Philippines Network
- Release: June 11, 1987

Kamao (lit. 'Fist') is a 1987 Filipino made-for-television action film directed by Celso Ad. Castillo and starring Fernando Poe Jr., Castillo, Mary Walter, and Rachel Ann Wolfe. Produced as the first television film for the Artista anthology program on Radio Philippines Network (RPN), it is about a boxer-turned-barangay captain who has to deal with a gang of drug dealers. The film first aired on RPN in the Philippines on June 11, 1987.

== Cast ==
- Fernando Poe Jr.
- Celso Ad. Castillo
- Mary Walter
- Rachel Ann Wolfe

== Release ==
Kamao originally aired on RPN in the Philippines on June 11, 1987, as the first installment of the Artista anthology program.

=== Critical response ===
Art Dialogo of the Manila Standard gave Kamao a positive, albeit cynical, review. While he considered Fernando Poe Jr. as "not a letdown" and Celso Ad. Castillo to be "believable", he gave special praise to Rachel Ann Wolfe's performance as the drug-addled sister of Poe's character, stating that she "lent freshness to what could have been another washed out production.
