= Dondon Nakar =

- Born: Guillermo Serafin L. Nakar III; July 26, 1959
- Died: November 1, 2025 (aged 66)
- Notable work: Apat na Sikat
- Spouse: Candy Platon (separated)
- Children: 1
- Musical career
- Label: Vicor Music
- Formerly of: Apat na Sikat

Guillermo Serafin "Dondon" L. Nakar III was a Filipino actor and singer who was active in the 1970s.

== Early life ==
Guillermo Serafin "Dondon" L. Nakar III was born on July 26, 1959.

== Career ==
Dondon Nakar was reputed to be a matinée idol in the 1970s. He was seen as part of a love team with Winnie Santos the younger sister of Vilma Santos.

Dondon's career in the entertainment industry started from his appearance in Tita Betty's Children's Show, a talent search program. His first acting role was in 1971 film Alaala ng Pag-ibig of Ed V per Productions. Nakar also appeared in the 1972 film Fist to Kill of Perlas Productions as well as portrayed the role of Ding in Darna and the Giants starring the older Santos. In the following year, he appeared in 1973 films Binhi and Ang Barbaro at si Genghis Khan.

Nakar's reputation grew in appearing in the musical-variety show Apat na Sikat which aired in IBC from 1975 to 1981. It also featured Lala Aunor, Arnold Gamboa, and Winnie Santos. However, Nakar was the first to leave the quartet, and was replaced by Eddie Villamayor.

Nakar debuted as a lead actor in the 1976 film Pilyang Engkantada costarring with Winnie Santos. Other film credits include Menor de Edad (1979), Nang Bumuka ang Sampagita (1980), and Ang Babaeng Hinugot sa Aking Tadyang (1981).

He also sang the theme song for the 1980–1983 television soap drama Flor de Luna which starred Janice de Belen. As a musician, he was also contracted to the Vicor Music Corporation.

== Personal life ==
Dondon Nakar was married to Candy Platon with whom he had a son. Despite separating ways with Platon, they remained friends.

== Death ==
Nakar died of cardiac arrest on November 1, 2025. He was 66 years old.
