= Patayin sa Sindak si Barbara (TV series) =

2008 Philippine television drama series

- Title card
- Genre: Soap opera Horror; Action; Thriller; Supsence
- Created by: Celso Ad. Castillo
- Based on: Patayin Mo sa Sindak si Barbara (1974) by Celso Ad. Castillo
- Directed by: Jerry Lopez Sineneng; Gilbert G. Perez
- Starring: Kris Aquino
- Country of origin: Philippines
- Original language: Filipino
- No. of episodes: 15

Production
- Executive producer: Emerald Suarez
- Running time: 30-45 minutes
- Production company: Dreamscape Entertainment Television

Original release
- Network: ABS-CBN
- Release: January 7 – January 25, 2008

Patayin sa Sindak si Barbara (transl. Frighten Barbara to Death) is a 2008 Philippine television drama horror series broadcast by ABS-CBN. Based on a 1974 Philippine film of the same title, the series is the second instalment of Sineserye Presents: The Susan Roces Cinema Collection. Directed by Jerry Lopez Sineneng and Gilbert G. Perez, it stars Kris Aquino, Albert Martinez, Jodi Sta. Maria, and Ms. Susan Roces. It aired on the network's Primetime Bida line up and worldwide on TFC from January 7 to January 25, 2008, replacing Pinoy Big Brother: Celebrity Edition 2 and was replaced by Lobo.

This series was streaming on Jeepney TV YouTube Channel every 6:00 pm & 6:30 pm.

== Original film and initial remake ==
The original film was made in 1974 starring Susan Roces.

Another film was made in 1995 starring Lorna Tolentino.

== Plot ==
Show's Main Cast

All their lives, Barbara always gave way to her younger half-sister Ruth so she would be accepted by her new family. When they were older, she met Fritz and they instantly fell in love with each other. But Ruth also wants Fritz. She told them she would kill herself if Fritz would not marry her. So Barbara again gave way and made Fritz marry Ruth even with a heavy heart. She stayed in the States as a hospital nurse, but one day she received a call from the Philippines saying that Ruth killed herself and it was witnessed by her only daughter Karen. She quickly came to the country to mourn with her stepmother and to take care of her currently unstable niece. But when she arrived, strange things start to happen. It seems that Ruth killed herself because of her paranoia that her husband is seeing Barbara in the States during his business trips. Ruth always knew that Fritz will always love Barbara and not her. To exact revenge on Barbara, she haunts the house through the doll, Chelsea and through her own daughter. She hurts and even kills all the people that are dear to Barbara until there is nobody left but Barbara herself.

== Cast and characters ==
=== Main cast ===
- Kris Aquino as Barbara
- Albert Martinez as Fritz Martinez
- Jodi Sta. Maria as Ruth Martinez

=== Supporting cast ===
- Susan Roces as Amanda
- Celine Lim as Karen Martinez
- Maja Salvador as Agnes Martinez
- Jay-R Siaboc as Dale
- Joem Bascon as John
- Kitkat as Tina Magbintang
- Tim Espinosa as one of the spirit questors
- Janvier Daily as Badong
- Eva Darren as Elsa Magbintang
- Chelsea as the possessed doll

=== Guest cast ===
- Eliza Pineda as Young Barbara
- Khaycee Aboloc as Young Ruth
- Chen Zenhric Dimayuga as Young Badong

== Reception ==
Patayin Sa Sindak Si Barbara was successful in both Mega Manila and nationwide viewing. Its pilot episode got a 26.4% rating, the highest was 29.9%, while the lowest was 25.8%. According to AGB-Nielsen, its pilot episode in NUTAM, 35.4%, was the No. 10 Highest Pilot Episode since 2007.

== DVD release ==
In February 2008, a DVD containing all 15 episodes of Patayin Sa Sindak Si Barbara has been available at records stores, through Star Home Video.

== See also ==
- List of programs broadcast by ABS-CBN
- Sineserye Presents
