= Patayin Mo Sa Sindak Si Barbara =

1974 film by Celso Ad. Castillo

Patayin Mo sa Sindak si Barbara
- Theatrical release poster
- Directed by: Celso Ad. Castillo
- Screenplay by: Mike Relon Makiling
- Story by: Celso Ad Castillo
- Produced by: Jesusa S. Poe
- Starring: Susan Roces; Rosanna Ortiz; Dante Rivero; Mary Walter
- Cinematography: Ricardo Remias
- Edited by: Augusto Salvador
- Music by: Ernani Cuenco
- Production company: Rosas Productions
- Release date: August 16, 1974
- Running time: 113 minutes
- Country: Philippines
- Language: Filipino

Patayin Mo sa Sindak si Barbara (transl. Frighten Barbara to Death) is a 1974 Filipino psychological horror film directed by Celso Ad Castillo from a story concept he developed, with its screenplay written by Mike Relon Makiling. The film stars Susan Roces as the eponymous character, alongside Rosanna Ortiz, Dante Rivero, and Mary Walter.

== Plot ==
Barbara has always been overly indulgent of her little sister, Ruth's, every whim. Years later, Barbara meets and falls in love with Fritz, who is smitten with her. But the spoiled Ruth confesses to her older sister that she, too, is in love with Fritz and threatens to kill herself if he does not marry her. So with a heavy heart, Barbara once again accommodates Ruth's demands and convinces Fritz to court her younger sister instead. In a twisted act of devotion, Fritz reluctantly agrees to marry Ruth to prove his love for Barbara. After the wedding, Barbara decides to start a new life abroad, to give Fritz a chance to fall in love with Ruth, and for Barbara to get over her feelings for him.

Her past comes back to haunt her when Barbara receives news that her younger sister has killed herself, and was witnessed by Ruth's only daughter, Karen. Barbara immediately returns to the Philippines to mourn her sister and comfort her unstable niece. Upon Barbara's return, she learns the reason surrounding Ruth's mysterious death.

Throughout their marriage, Ruth felt that Fritz never loved her but harbored feelings for her sister. In a state of paranoid delusion, she suspects that Fritz was having an affair and used his business trips to the US as an excuse to rendezvous with Barbara. In a jealous rage, she commits suicide and haunts the household through a doll to exact revenge on everyone who wronged her.

== Cast ==
- Susan Roces as Barbara Enriquez
- Rosanna Ortiz as Ruth E. Martinez
- Dante Rivero as Fritz Martinez
- Mary Walter as Benita Enriquez
- Beth Manlongat as Karen E. Martinez
- Edna Diaz as Erlyn
- Ellen Esguerra as Ms. Esguerra
- Angie Ferro as Beatriz
- Venchito Galvez
- Rosa Santos

== Remakes ==
In 1995, Star Cinema remade the film as Patayin sa Sindak si Barbara with Lorna Tolentino as Barbara and Dawn Zulueta as Ruth, directed by Chito S. Roño and written by Ricky Lee. Only veteran actress Angie Ferro appeared on the remake in the same role as Beatriz.

In 2008, ABS-CBN bought the rights to remake the film as a primetime televsion eries starring Kris Aquino as Barbara for Sineserye Presents: The Susan Roces Cinema Collection, an anthology series that adapted three of Roces' well-known films for television. The program debuted with a 38.1% rating, becoming the first television remake in the Philippines with honors of a high rating.

A reimagining, titled Barbara Reimagined, was released on November 8, 2019, on iWant. It stars Nathalie Hart as the title character, Mariel de Leon as Ruth, and JC de Vera as James.

== Awards and nominations ==
Award-Giving Body	Category	Recipient	Result
1975 FAMAS Awards
1975 FAMAS Awards	Best Special Effects	Patayin Mo sa Sindak si Barbara	Won
1975 FAMAS Awards	Best Child Actress	Beth Manlongat	Won
1975 FAMAS Awards	Best Picture	Patayin Mo sa Sindak si Barbara	Nominated
1975 FAMAS Awards	Best Actress	Susan Roces	Nominated

== See also ==
- Patayin sa Sindak si Barbara - a 1995 remake of the 1974 film.
- Patayin sa Sindak si Barbara - a Filipino TV series based on the 1974 film.
