= Celso Ad. Castillo =

Filipino film director and screenwriter

- Born: Celso Adolfo Castillo; September 12, 1943; Siniloan, Laguna, Philippines
- Died: November 26, 2012 (aged 69); Siniloan, Laguna, Philippines
- Education: Manuel L. Quezon University
- Occupations: Film director; screenwriter
- Years active: 1965–2011
- Spouse: Ofelia Lopez-Castillo
- Children: 4

Celso Adolfo Castillo (September 12, 1943 – November 26, 2012) was a Filipino film director and screenwriter. He was known as the Messiah of Philippine Cinema for directing films that broke new ground in Philippine cinema, including Asedillo, Patayin Mo sa Sindak si Barbara, and Burlesk Queen, among others. Castillo was a prolific director who made 64 films throughout his life, casting actors like Fernando Poe Jr., Vilma Santos, and Maria Isabel Lopez.

== Early life and education ==
Castillo was born in Siniloan, Laguna on September 12, 1943. He became a movie director, scriptwriter and actor. He was the son of lawyer-writer Dominador Ad Castillo, and Marta Adolfo.

Celso Castillo studied at Manuel L. Quezon University and obtained his Bachelor of Arts degree in English literature in 1964.

== Career ==
Castillo started as a writer for a comic magazine. With the help of his father, he published his own magazine where he wrote all the stories from cover to cover, using different names as authors. A movie producer commissioned him to write a script on the character of "James Bandong", named after Britain's superspy. The film made money and it was followed by a sequel, Dr. Yes, 1965, a spoof on the British film, Dr. No. He wrote and directed his first movie, Misyong Mapanganib (Dangerous Mission), in 1966.

The most memorable of his earlier films is Asedillo, 1971, based on Teodoro Asedillo, a Filipino rebel of the 1930s who was hunted down as a bandit by the American colonial government. With this film, Fernando Poe, Jr. acquired the image that was to set him off as a legendary gunslinger, a defender of the poor and oppressed. Castillo also made Ang Alamat (The Legend), 1972, with Poe as a reluctant hero who battle a whole private army all by himself to defend his townfolk.

Succeeding Castillo films aspired towards thematic originality: small-town perversion in Ang Madugong Daigdig ni Salvacion (The Bloody World of Salvacion), 1975; incest in Tag-ulan sa Tag-araw (Rainy Days in Summer), 1975; political and period gangsterism in Daluyong at Habagat (Tall Waves, Wild Wind), 1976. Even his sex films had a to message to tell. One finds spiritual undertones in the story of an oversexed girl in Nympha(Nymph), 1971; a struggle of conscience in a stripteaser who laughed on the outside but cried on the inside in Burlesk Queen (Burlesque Queen), 1977; tribal conflict in Aliw-iw, 1979; a conflict of family values in Snake Sisters, 1983; and the politics of domination in Isla (Island), 1983.

Other notable Castillo films are Ang Mahiwagang Daigdig ni Pedro Penduko (The Wonderful World of Pedro Penduko), 1973; Ang Pinakamagandang Hayop sa Balat ng Lupa (The Most Beautiful Animal on the Face of the Earth), 1975; Ang Alamat ni Julian Makabayan (The Legend of Julian Makabayan), 1979; Totoy Boogie, 1980; Uhaw na Dagat (Thirsty Sea), 1981; Pedro Tunasan, 1983; Virgin People, 1983; and Payaso (Clown), 1986. It was Castillo who started a trend in Philippine movies known as the wet look which later helped establish bomba film as a definite genre.

Castillo also became the "Master Of Horror And Suspense" when actress Susan Roces shifts to the Classic Pinoy Gothic genre her first horror film was Patayin Mo Sa Sindak Si Barbara (Kill Barabara In Terror) about the malevolent spirit of a suicidal sister comes to torment against her very own sister out of jealousy and resentment and even possessing her own daughter for her own sinister plans, 1974; Maligno (Satan's Seed) about a family targeted by a Satanic Cult and their accomplices of witches and warlocks attempting to steal a beautiful woman's innocence and finds herself impregnated by an evil spirit fearing that the child she would conceive became the child of the devil also encountering bizarre events and hallucinogenic incidents, 1977. Shifting to the 1990s and 2000s Lihim ni Madonna (Madonna's Secret) about a brainwashing ghost from the past drives a young woman to the brink of derangement and insanity, 1997; Sanib (Possessed) talks about a young bride finds herself being possessed by the specter of her long dead stepsister, 2003.

Castillo won the Filipino Academy of Movie Arts and Sciences (FAMAS) awards for Best Director and Best Story, and the Urian awards for Best Director and Best Screenplay for Pagputi ng Uwak, Pag-itim ng Tagak (When the Crow Turns White, When the Heron Turns Black) in 1978. He shared the story credits with Ruben Nicdao, and the screenplay credits with Lando jacob, Ishko Lopez and Ruben Nicdao. He won the FAMAS best director trophy again in 1985 for Paradise Inn, a Lolita Rodriguez-Vivian Velez starrer. He also has a FAMAS best supporting actor award, for Sampung Ahas ni Eba (Ten Snakes of Eve), in 1984.

Castillo's last directing role was Medical Center in 2011, while his last acting career on TV was Reputasyon in 2011.

== Personal life ==
=== Family ===
Castillo was married 3 times and his last wife was Ofelia Lopez-Castillo. He had ten children: Christopher (Jan. 19, 1964-Aug. 12, 2018), Catherine, John, Amerjapil, Crystal, Amir, Kid, Patrick, Monique and Roxanne Ad Castillo.

=== Death ===
Celso Ad Castillo, died early morning of November 26, 2012, due to a heart attack, according to the director’s brother John. Castillo, who was working on his autobiography Celso Ad. Castillo: An Autobiography and His Craft, died at 1:45 a.m. at his home in Siniloan, Laguna. He was brought to Pakil General Hospital at around 3:00 AM where he was declared dead on arrival. He was buried beside his son Christoper at Siniloan Public Cemetery in Siniloan, Laguna

== Filmography ==
=== Film ===
Year	Title	Credits			Notes
Year	Title	Directed by	Story by	Screenplay by	Notes
1964	James Ban-dong	No	Yes	Yes	Directed by Luis San Juan
1964	Dolpong Scarface: Agent 1-2-3	No	Yes	Yes	Directed by Luis San Juan
1965	Dr. Yes	No	Yes	Yes	Directed by Luis San Juan
1965	Sampson at 7 Delaila	No	Yes	Yes	Directed by Luis San Juan
1965	Misyong Mapanganib (Top Secret 7-11)	Yes	Yes	No	
1965	Zebra	Yes	Yes	No	
1965	Mansanas sa Paraiso	Yes	No	Yes	
1965	Pitong Zapata	No	No	Yes	Directed by Luis San Juan
1967	Barako	Yes	No	No	
1967	The Pogi Dozen	No	Yes	Yes	Directed by Luis San Juan
1968	Dirty-Face Max	No	Yes	Yes	Directed by Tony Ad. Castillo Jr.
1968	Kapwa Walang Panginoon	Yes	Yes	Yes	
1968	The Tall, the Dark, and the Handsome	No	Yes	Yes	Directed by Luis San Juan
1968	We Only Live Wais	No	Yes	Yes	Directed by Luis San Juan
1970	Inside Job	No	Yes	Yes	Directed by Luis San Juan
1970	Romantiko	Yes	No	No	
1970	Usapang Lalake	Yes	Yes	Yes	
1970	Omar Cassidy and the Sandalyas Kid	No	Yes	Yes	Directed by Luis San Juan
1970	Agent Silencer at ang Pitong Brassieres	No	Yes	Yes	Directed by Luis San Juan
1971	Dimasupil Brothers	No	Yes	Yes	Directed by Manuel Cinco
1971	Asedillo	Yes	Yes	Yes	
1971	The Virgin	Yes	No	Yes	
1971	Nympha	Yes	No	No	
1972	Ang Gangster at ang Birhen	Yes	No	Yes	
1972	Santo Domingo	Yes	No	Yes	
1972	Ang Alamat	Yes	No	Yes	
1973	Ang Mahiwagang Daigdig ni Pedro Penduko	Yes	No	Yes	Based on the Pedro Penduko series by Francisco V. Coching
1973	Ato ti Bondying	Yes	No	No	
1973	Kung Bakit Dugo ang Kulay ng Gabi	Yes	No	Yes	
1973	Esteban	Yes	No	No	
1974	Return of the Dragon	Yes	Yes	Yes	
1974	Patayin Mo Sa Sindak Si Barbara	Yes	Yes	No	
1974	Ang Pinakamagandang Hayop sa Balat ng Lupa	Yes	Yes	No	
1975	Isabel of the Islands	Yes	Yes	Yes	
1975	Tag-ulan sa Tag-araw	Yes	Yes	Yes	
1975	Ang Madugong Daigdig ni Salvacion	Yes	No	No	
1976	Daluyong at Habagat	Yes	No	No	
1976	Ihalik Mo Ako sa Diyos!	Yes	No	No	
1977	Maligno	Yes	No	Yes	
1977	Burlesk Queen	Yes	Yes	Yes	
1978	Pagputi ng Uwak, Pag-itim ng Tagak	Yes	Yes	Yes	
1979	Bakit May Pag-Ibig Pa?	Yes	Yes	Yes	
1979	Aliw-iw	Yes	No	No	
1979	Ang Alamat ni Julian Makabayan	Yes	No	No	
1980	Totoy Boogie	Yes	Yes	Yes	
1981	Uhaw na Dagat	Yes	Yes	Yes	
1982	Brown Emanuelle	Yes	No	No	
1983	Pedro Tunasan	Yes	Yes	Yes	
1983	Dragon's Quest	Yes	No	No	
1984	Virgin People	Yes	Yes	Yes	
1984	Sampung Ahas ni Eva	Yes	No	No	
1985	Isla	Yes	Yes	No	
1985	Paradise Inn	Yes	Yes	No	
1985	Perfumed Garden	Yes	No	No	
1986	Kailan Tama ang Mali	Yes	No	No	
1986	Ang Daigdig ay Isang Butil na Luha	Yes	No	No	
1986	Payaso	Yes	Yes	No	
1986	The Diary of Vietname Rose	Yes	Yes	No	
1987	Mga Lihim ng Kalapati	Yes	Yes	No	
1988	Pikoy Goes to Malaysia	Yes	No	No	
1992	Tag-araw, Tag-ulan	Yes	No	No	
1993	Kapag Iginuhit ang Hatol ng Puso	Yes	No	No	
1994	Comfort Women: A Cry for Justice	Yes	No	No	
1996	Virgin People 2	Yes	Yes	Yes	
1997	Isla 2	Yes	Yes	Yes	
1997	Lihim ni Madonna	Yes	No	No	
1997	Mananayaw	Yes	No	No	
1997	Droga, Pagtatapat ng mga Babaeng Adik	Yes	No	No	
2003	Nympha	Yes	Yes	Yes	
2003	Virgin People III	Yes	No	Yes	
2003	Sanib	Yes	Yes	Yes	
2008	Snake Sisters	Yes	Yes	Yes	
2010	666	Yes	Yes	Yes	
2013	Bahay ng Lagim	Yes	No	No	Released posthumously
2019	Barbara Reimagined	No	Yes	No	Inspired by Patayin Mo Sa Sindak Si Barbara

=== Television ===
Year	Title	Credits			Notes
Year	Title	Directed by	Story by	Screenplay by	Notes
1995	Komikero	Yes	Yes	Yes	TV Movie
1995	Aswang ng Santa Barbara	Yes	No	No	TV Movie
2007-	SineSerye	No	Yes	No	Original story written (2 episodes)
2011	Medical Center	Yes	No	No	TV Movie
2015-	Kailan ba Tama ang Mali?	No	Yes	Yes	Based on the 1986 film

=== Acting roles ===
Year	Title	Role
1987	Kamao	
1988	Pikoy Goes to Malaysia	Pikoy
1995	Victim No. 1: Delia Maga (Jesus, Pray for Us!) – A Massacre in Singapore	
2010	Star Confessions: Blind Item: The Carmelito 'Shalala' Reyes Confession	Shalala's father
2011	Babaeng Hampaslupa	Master Ming
2011	Reputasyon	Samuel Aragon

== Awards ==
Year	Award Given Body	Category	Work	Result
1972	FAMAS	Best Director	Nympha	Nominated
1973	FAMAS	Best Director	Ang Alamat	Nominated
1974	FAMAS	Best Director	Esteban	Nominated
1975	FAMAS	Best Director	The Most Beautiful Animal in the World	Nominated
1977	Metro Manila Film Festival	Best Director	Burlesk Queen	Won
1978	FAMAS	Best Director	Sa Dulo ng Kris	Nominated
1978	Gawad Urian	Pinakamahusay na Direksyon	Burlesk Queen	Nominated
1979	Gawad Urian	Pinakamahusay na Dulang Pampelikula	Pagputi ng Uwak, Pag-itim ng Tagak	Won
1979	Gawad Urian	Pinakamahusay na Direksyon	Pagputi ng Uwak, Pag-itim ng Tagak	Won
1979	FAMAS	Best Story	Pagputi ng Uwak, Pag-itim ng Tagak	Won
1979	FAMAS	Best Screenplay	Pagputi ng Uwak, Pag-itim ng Tagak	Won
1979	FAMAS	Best Director	Pagputi ng Uwak, Pag-itim ng Tagak	Won
1981	Gawad Urian	Natatanging Pelikula ng Dekada	Pagputi ng Uwak, Pag-itim ng Tagak	Won
1985	FAMAS	Best Supporting Actor	Sampung Ahas ni Eva	Won
1985	Metro Manila Film Festival	Best Story	Paradise Inn	Won
1986	Gawad Urian	Pinakamahusay na Direksyon	Paradise Inn	Nominated
1986	FAMAS	Best Director	Paradise Inn	Won
1999	FAMAS	Best Supporting Actor	Hiwaga ng Panday	Nominated
2003	Young Critics Circle	Best Performance	Itlog	Nominated
2007	FAMAS	Lifetime Achievement Award		Won
2007	Film Academy of the Philippines	Lifetime Achievement Award		Won
2010	Cinema One Originals	Special Honorary Award		Won
2012	Cinemanila International Film Festival	Lifetime Achievement Award		Won
