= Susan Roces =

Filipino actress (1941–2022)

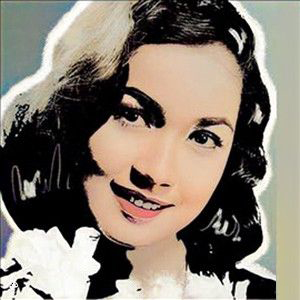
- Roces, as depicted in a postage stamp of the PhilPost
- Born: Jesusa Purificación Levy Sonora; July 28, 1941; Bacolod, Negros Occidental, Commonwealth of the Philippines
- Died: May 20, 2022 (aged 80); San Juan, Metro Manila, Philippines
- Resting place: Manila North Cemetery, Santa Cruz, Manila, Philippines
- Occupation: Actress
- Years active: 1952, 1956–2022
- Spouse: Fernando Poe Jr. (m. 1968; died 2004)
- Children: Grace Poe
- Relatives: Rosemarie Sonora (sister); Sheryl Cruz (niece)

Jesusa Purificación Levy Sonora-Poe (July 28, 1941 – May 20, 2022), known professionally as Susan Roces (Tagalog pronunciation: [ˈɾɔsɛs]), was a Filipino actress. She rose to fame in mid-1950s and became the biggest box-office star of the 1960s. Known for playing wholesome and sweet characters in romantic comedies and musicals during her youth, she dabbled into horror and drama in the succeeding decades. She was dubbed the "Queen of Philippine Movies" and appeared in more than 130 films throughout her career that spanned over six decades.

== Early life and education ==
Jesusa Purificación Levy Sonora was born in Bacolod, Negros Occidental on July 28, 1941. She was the daughter of Jesús Tonggoy Sonora and Purificación Levy. Her sister, Rosa María “Rosemarie” Sonora, is also an actress, as is the latter’s daughter Sheryl Cruz. Roces and her sister have Jewish ancestry through their maternal grandfather, Adolphe Blum Levy, who had emigrated to Iloilo from Marckolsheim in the Alsace region of France on its border with modern Germany.

Roces finished her high school studies at La Consolación College (LCC) in Bacolod in 1956. It was during her stay at LCC that she committed to pursue a career in acting. Her third year high school teacher Luisa Medel recognized her talent for public speaking and acting, and advised her to take the same course as hers in tertiary education. After graduating high school, Roces went to Manila to follow her mentor's advice.

== Personal life ==
Roces married Fernando Poe, Jr. on December 25, 1968, at Santuario de San José Parish in Greenhills, Mandaluyong. They have an adopted daughter, former MTRCB Chairperson and former Senator Grace Poe. Roces is the sister of Rosemarie Sonora.

She was an advocate for her husband, who ran for president in the 2004 Philippine presidential election, and later died of stroke in December 2004. Roces was convinced President Gloria Macapagal Arroyo won through electoral fraud at her husband's expense, and demanded Arroyo resign in June 2005.

On September 29, 2007, the ABS-CBN Corporation acquired exclusive rights to the movie library of Fernando Poe, Jr. after Roces signed the contract. Then-ABS-CBN Chairman Eugenio López III, Cory Vidanes, Senior Vice President of TVP Production, and Poe's daughter Grace, were also present.

On the night of December 23, 2007, ABS-CBN Channel 2 aired Alay ni Da King: a Fernando Poe Jr. Special, hosted by Charo Santos-Concio. Roces contributed to the feature on their married life. A 38-minute music video also showed various scenes from several of Poe's movies, a project Poe himself had just finished before his death.

In addition to English and Tagalog, Roces also spoke Hiligaynon.

== Career ==
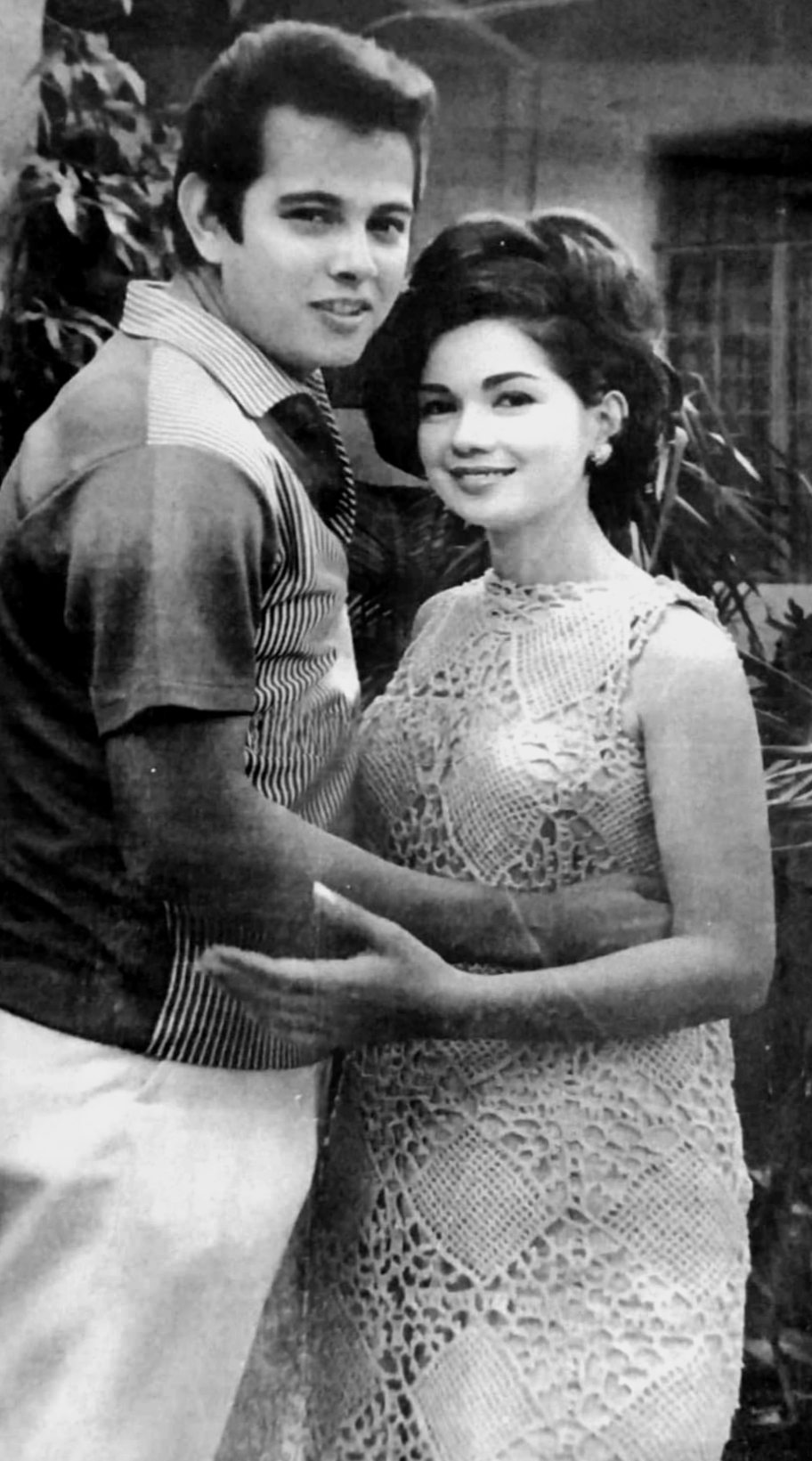
Susan Roces with Eddie Gutierrez in 1966

Roces began her film career as a child actress debuting in the 1952 film Mga Bituin ng Kinabukasan at age 11. In 1956, Roces went to Sampaguita Pictures' office in Quezon City to meet her idol Gloria Romero. Jose Perez, founder and head of the film studio, offered Roces a contract on the spot leading to her first starring role in Boksingera. Roces also starred in several Philippine feature films including Ang Daigdig Ko'y Ikaw (1965), Gumising Ka Maruja (1967), Patayin Mo Sa Sindak Si Barbara (1974), Maligno and Mano Po 2: My Home (2003). She has also garnered five FAMAS Awards; two of which are Best Actress awards. During her career as a celebrity endorser, she appeared in various brands including Coca-Cola, Lux, Blend 45, and Lavoris, as well as on TV commercials of RiteMed and Champion Detergent.

She appeared in two episodes of the long-running drama anthology series Maalaala Mo Kaya. In Sineserye Presents: The Susan Roces Cinema Collection (2008–2009), she played the character "Amanda" in the TV adaptation of Patayin sa Sindak si Barbara, and also served as a host in Maligno and Florinda. Roces was cast as "Lola Aura" in Iisa Pa Lamang (2008), and later guest-starred on episodes of May Bukas Pa (2009) and 100 Days to Heaven (2011). She was also part of the TV5 drama series Babaeng Hampaslupa in the main role of "Helena".

Roces became recognized to new audiences as "Lola Henya" in Walang Hanggan (2012), where she shared credits with Coco Martin, Julia Montes, Helen Gamboa, Dawn Zulueta and Richard Gomez, among many others. Walang Hanggan was a phenomenal success and the role earned her a PMPC Star Awards for TV nomination for Best Drama Actress. Roces worked again with Montes in Muling Buksan ang Puso (2013) and with Martin in a 2013 Christmas episode of fantasy anthology series Wansapanataym. She later co-starred in Sana Bukas pa ang Kahapon (2014) as "Ruth".

Her final television assignment FPJ's Ang Probinsyano (2015), an adaptation of her late husband's of the same name which would go on to be the longest-running Philippine drama series of all time. Again co-starring with Coco Martin, she portrayed the key character "Lola Flora", grandmother of the series' protagonists Ador de Leon and Cardo Dalisay. Her long-standing participation in the series lasted for six years, until her untimely death in 2022 during the COVID-19 pandemic era.

== Death and memorial ==
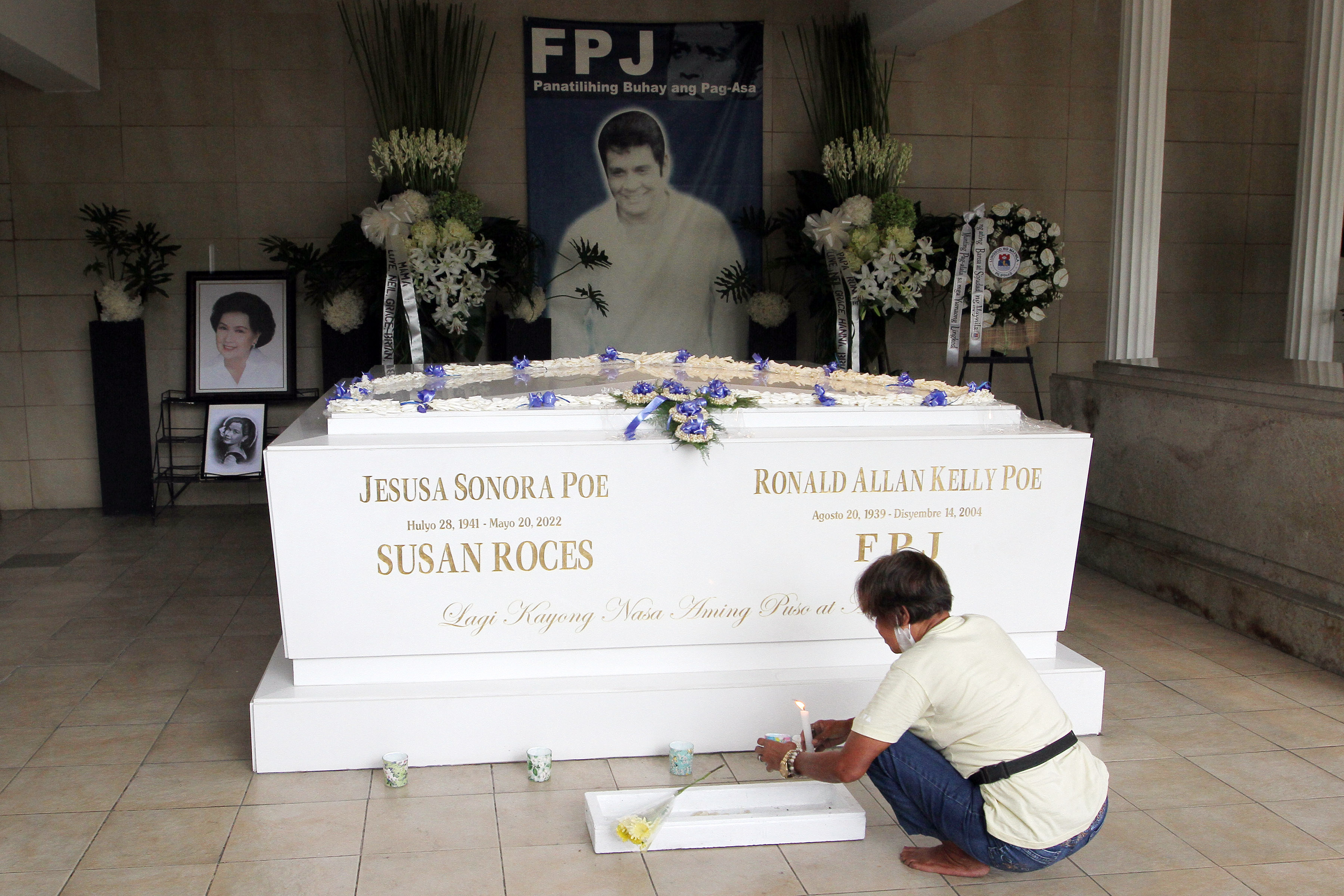
Tomb of Roces and her husband Fernando Poe Jr. at the Manila North Cemetery on November 1, 2022

Roces died on May 20, 2022, at the age of 80, due to cardiopulmonary arrest. A day earlier, she was rushed to Cardinal Santos Medical Center in San Juan City near where her parents lived, after some chest pains and difficulty in breathing. Her daughter Grace Poe had also said "My mother is already old." The official cause of her death was listed as heart failure. The Senate and the House of Representatives passed resolutions to honor her legacy. ACT-CIS Partylist proposed to posthumously induct Roces into the Order of National Artists of the Philippines for her contributions to the entertainment industry. Roces was buried next to her late husband in the Manila North Cemetery.

== Filmography ==
=== Television ===
Year	Title	Role	Notes
1996	Maalaala Mo Kaya	Anita Mariano	Episode: "Pahiram ng Isang Pasko"
1997	Wansapanataym	Lucring	Episode: "The Christmas Witch"
2006	John en Shirley	Encarnacion Ramirez	Supporting Cast
2008	Sineserye Presents: The Susan Roces Cinema Collection; Patayin sa Sindak si Barbara	Amanda	Supporting Cast
2008	Maalaala Mo Kaya	Angge	Episode: "Basura"
2008	Iisa Pa Lamang	Aura Castillejos	Supporting Cast
2009	May Bukas Pa	Nieves Antazo	Guest Cast
2009–2010	Sana Ngayong Pasko	Remedios Dionisio	Main Cast
2011	Babaeng Hampaslupa	Helena See	Main Cast
2011	100 Days to Heaven	Amelita Manalastas-Salvador	Guest Cast
2012	Walang Hanggan	Virginia "Henya" Cruz	Supporting Cast
2013	Muling Buksan ang Puso	Adelina Laurel-Beltran	Supporting Cast
2013	Wansapanataym	Fenny	Episode: "Simbang Gabi"
2014	Eat Bulaga! Lenten Drama Special	Maria	Television film; episode: "Karugtong ng Puso"
2014	Sana Bukas pa ang Kahapon	Ruth Gaspar	Supporting Cast
2015–2022	FPJ's Ang Probinsyano	Flora Borja-de Leon	Main Cast (Finale TV appearance)

=== Film ===
Year	Original title
1952	Mga Bituin ng Kinabukasan
1956	Boksingera
1956	Kulang sa 7
1956	Mga Anak ng Diyos
1957	Sino ang Maysala?
1957	Mga Ligaw na Bulaklak
1958	Prinsesang Gusgusin
1958	Ako ang Maysala
1958	Mga Reyna ng Vicks
1958	Madaling Araw
1958	Tawag ng Tanghalan
1958	Ulilang Anghel
1959	Ipinagbili Ko ang Aking Anak
1959	Handsome
1959	Pitong Pagsisisi
1959	Debutante
1959	Mga Anghel sa Lansangan
1959	Susan Roces at the Pacific Festival
1959	Wedding Bells
1960	Beatnik
1964	The Dolly Sisters
1965	Portrait of My Love
1965	Ang Daigdig Ko'y Ikaw
1965	Pilipinas Kong Mahal
1966	Zamboanga
1966	Pepe en Pilar
1967	Maruja
1967	Langit at Lupa
1968	To Susan with Love
1968	Anong Ganda Mo?
1968	Bakasin Mo sa Gunita
1968	Bandana
1968	Sorrento
1968	Magpakailan Man
1968	Tanging Ikaw
1968	Kulay Rosas ang Pag-ibig
1969	Perlas ng Silangan
1969	Ikaw ang Lahat sa Akin
1970	Divina Gracia
1972	Salaginto't Salagubang
1973	Karnabal
1973	Florinda
1974	Patayin Mo sa Sindak si Barbara
1977	Maligno
1978	Gumising Ka, Maruja
1979	Mahal... Saan Ka Nanggaling Kagabi?
1979	Mahal... Ginagabi Ka Nanaman
1979	Angelita... Ako ang Iyong Ina
1980	Tanikala
1982	Manedyer si Kumander
1984	Hoy Wala Kang Paki
1986	Nasaan Ka nang Kailangan Kita?
1986	Inday Inday sa Balitaw
1986	Payaso
1987	Bunsong Kerubin
1987	No Retreat... No Surrender... Si Kumander
1987	1 + 1 = 12 (+ 1): One Plus One Equals Twelve (Cheaper by the Dozen)
1988	Love Boat: Mahal Trip Kita
1988	Kambal Tuko
1988	Buy One, Take One
1989	Ang Lahat ng Ito Pati Na ang Langit
1989	Here Comes the Bride
1990	Mundo Man ay Magunaw
1990	Feel na Feel
1991	Ubos Na ang Luha Ko
1997	Isinakdal Ko ang Aking Ina
2003	Mano Po 2: My Home (Last Movie Appearance)

== Awards and nominations ==
Award-giving body	Year	Category	Nominated Work(s)	Result
FAMAS Awards	1959	Dr. Ciriaco Santiago Memorial Award	—N/a	Won
FAMAS Awards	1966	Best Actress	Ana-Roberta	Nominated
FAMAS Awards	1968	Best Actress	Maruja	Nominated
FAMAS Awards	1969	Best Actress	To Susan with love	Nominated
FAMAS Awards	1971	Best Actress	Divina Gracia	Nominated
FAMAS Awards	1973	Best Actress	Bilangguang puso	Nominated
FAMAS Awards	1974	Best Actress	Hanggang sa Kabila ng daigdig: The Tony Maiquez Story	Nominated
FAMAS Awards	1975	Best Actress	Patayin mo sa Sindak si Barbara	Nominated
FAMAS Awards	1978	Best Actress	Maligno	Won
FAMAS Awards	1979	Best Actress	Gumising ka Maruja	Won
FAMAS Awards	1987	Best Actress	Nasaan ka ng kailangan kita	Nominated
FAMAS Awards	1988	Best Actress	Paano Kung wala ka na	Nominated
FAMAS Awards	1990	Best Actress	Ang lahat ng Ito pati na ang langit	Nominated
FAMAS Awards	1998	Best Actress	Isinakdal ko ang aking ina	Nominated
FAMAS Awards	2003	Lifetime Achievement Award	—N/a	Won
FAMAS Awards	2004	Huwarang Bituin	—N/a	Won
22nd PMPC Star Awards for Television	2008	Best Single Performance by an Actress	Maalaala Mo Kaya: Basura	Nominated
Cinema One Originals Digital Film Festival	2009	Cinema One Legend Award	—N/a	Won
PMPC Star Awards for Movies	2011	Ading Fernando Lifetime Achievement Award	—N/a	Won
26th PMPC Star Awards for Television	2012	Best Drama Actress	Walang Hanggan	Nominated
27th PMPC Star Awards for Television	2013	Best Drama Supporting Actress	Walang Hanggan	Nominated
FAMAS Awards	2015	Iconic Movie Queen of Philippine Cinema	—N/a	Won
30th PMPC Star Awards for Television	2016	Drama Supporting Actress	Ang Probinsyano	Nominated
FAMAS Awards	2017	Lifetime Achievement Award	—N/a	Won
31st PMPC Star Awards for Television	2017	Best Drama Supporting Actress	Ang Probinsyano	Nominated
32nd PMPC Star Awards for Television	2018	Best Drama Supporting Actress	Ang Probinsyano	Nominated
PMPC Star Awards for Movies	2019	Outstanding Star of the Century (Natatanging bituin ng siglo)	—N/a	Won
33rd PMPC Star Awards for Television	2019	Best Drama Supporting Actress	Ang Probinsyano	Nominated
Entertainment Editors Choice Awards	2022	Posthumous Award	—N/a	Won
